= 2012 Outback Bowl =

- 26th Outback Bowl
Michigan State Spartans	Georgia Bulldogs
(10–3)	(10–3)
Big Ten	SEC
33	30
Head coach: Mark Dantonio	Head coach: Mark Richt
AP / Coaches / BCS; 12 / 13 / 17	AP / Coaches / BCS; 18 / 18 / 16
	1	2	3	4	OT	2OT	3OT	Total
Michigan State	0	0	14	13	0	3	3	33
Georgia	2	14	0	11	0	3	0	30
- Date: January 2, 2012
- Season: 2011
- Stadium: Raymond James Stadium
- Location: Tampa, Florida
- MVP: Brandon Boykin (DB, Georgia)
- Favorite: Georgia by 3
- Referee: Ed Ardito (C-USA)
- Attendance: 49,429
- Payout: US$3.4 million per team

United States TV coverage
- Network: ABC
- Announcers: Mike Tirico (Play-by-Play); Jon Gruden (Analyst); Jenn Brown (Sidelines)
- Nielsen ratings: 5.14

The 2012 Outback Bowl was a post-season American college football bowl game, held on January 2, 2012, at Raymond James Stadium in Tampa, Florida, as part of the 2011–12 NCAA Bowl season. It was the 26th edition of the Outback Bowl, and was telecast at 1:00 p.m. ET to a national audience on ABC. It featured the Georgia Bulldogs from the Southeastern Conference (SEC) versus the Michigan State Spartans from the Big Ten Conference. Michigan State won, 33–30, in the third overtime period.

== Teams ==
The Spartans and Bulldogs had met two times before. Georgia held a 2–0 all-time record against Michigan State coming into the game.

=== Georgia ===
Georgia entered the game with a 10–3 record as the SEC East Division champion. In the 2011 SEC Championship Game, Georgia lost to LSU 10–42. The Bulldog's defense entered the game ranked 3rd in the FBS in totals yards allowed, allowing only 268.5 yards per game.

=== Michigan State ===
Michigan State entered the game with a 10–3 record as the Big Ten's Legends Division champion. In the 2011 Big Ten Football Championship Game, MSU lost to Wisconsin 39–42. The Spartan's defense entered the game ranked 5th in the FBS in total yards allowed, allowing only 272.7 yards per game. MSU also entered having lost 5 straight bowl games. The Spartan's last bowl win was the 2001 Silicon Valley Football Classic, where the Spartans beat the Fresno State Bulldogs 44–35.

== Game summary ==
The Bulldogs scored first when Brandon Boykin tackled Keshawn Martin in the end zone for a safety. On the ensuing drive, the Bulldogs drove to MSU's 5-yard line. However, on a 4th-and-1 play at the 5-yard line, UGA's Ken Malcome was stopped for a 1-yard loss, turning the ball over to MSU. The rest of the 1st quarter remained scoreless.

In the 2nd quarter, UGA scored on an 80-yard touchdown pass to Tavarres King to go up 9–0. On the ensuing drive, the Bulldog defense forced the Spartans to punt. UGA's Brandon Boykin returned the punt 92 yards to go up 16–0 at the end of the half.

The Spartans finally got on board in the 3rd quarter on an 8-yard Le'Veon Bell touchdown run to cut the deficit 16–8 after a two-point conversion. MSU closed the gap even further when Darqueze Dennard intercepted Aaron Murray 38 yards for a touchdown. The two-point conversion attempt failed, making it 16–14 going into the 4th quarter.

Taking advantage of an interception, Georgia extended their lead 19–14 in the 4th quarter on a 32-yard field goal from Blair Walsh. The Spartans took the lead on a 7-yard touchdown pass to Keith Nichol to make it 20–19 after a failed two-point conversion. Georgia responded with a 13-yard touchdown pass to Brandon Boykin to go up 27–20 after making a two-point conversion. On the ensuing drive, Jonathan Jenkins intercepted Kirk Cousins with only 3:56 left in regulation. However, Georgia was unable to run out the game clock and punted the ball away. With 85-yards to go, no timeouts and only 1 minute and 55 seconds left in regulation, Michigan State was able to tie the game 27–27 on a 1-yard touchdown run from Le'Veon Bell with only 14 seconds left in the game, forcing overtime.

Michigan State was on offense first in the 1st overtime period. The Spartan's offensive possession end when Kirk Cousins' pass was intercepted by Bacarri Rambo. UGA's Blair Walsh, however, missed a game winning 42-yard field, forcing a 2nd overtime period. Michigan State and Georgia both traded field goals to go into the 3rd overtime period tied 30–30. In the 3rd overtime period, MSU's Dan Conroy kicked a 28-yard field goal to go ahead 33–30. Georgia attempted to force a 4th overtime on a 47-yard field goal attempt from Blair Walsh. However, Walsh's kick was blocked, sealing the victory for Michigan State.

Georgia cornerback Brandon Boykin was named game MVP for scoring on offense, defense and special teams. Several Outback Bowl records were broken in the 2012 game, including longest punt return for a touchdown (Boykin's 92-yard punt return) and receiving touchdown (Tavarres King's 80-yard touchdown reception).

== Scoring summary ==
Source.

Scoring summary

Quarter	Time	Drive			Team	Scoring information	Score	
Quarter	Time	Plays	Yards	TOP	Team	Scoring information	MSU	UGA
1	12:07	1	-2	0:06	UGA	Keshawn Martin tackled in end zone for a safety by Brandon Boykin	0	2
2	3:06	1	80	0:12	UGA	Tavarres King 80 Yd Pass From Aaron Murray. (Blair Walsh Kick)	0	9
2	1:47	3	7	1:27	UGA	Brandon Boykin 92 Yd Punt Return. (Blair Walsh Kick)	0	16
3	7:52	9	48	2:47	MSU	Le'Veon Bell 8 Yd Run. (Kirk Cousins Pass To Brian Linthicum For Two-Point Conversion)	8	16
3	1:47	5	32	2:34	MSU	Darqueze Dennard 38 Yd Interception Return. (Two-Point Pass Conversion Failed)	14	16
4	9:58	3	-3	1:23	UGA	32-yard field goal by Blair Walsh	14	19
4	8:22	4	59	1:36	MSU	Keith Nichol 7 Yd Pass From Kirk Cousins. (Two-Point Pass Conversion Failed)	20	19
4	6:44	5	81	1:38	UGA	Brandon Boykin 13 Yd Pass From Aaron Murray. (Aaron Murray Pass To Malcolm Mitchell For Two-Point Conversion)	20	27
4	0:14	10	85	1:36	MSU	Le'Veon Bell 1 Yd Run. (Dan Conroy Kick)	27	27
2OT					UGA	48-yard field goal by Blair Walsh	27	30
2OT					MSU	35-yard field goal by Dan Conroy	30	30
3OT					MSU	28-yard field goal by Dan Conroy	33	30
"TOP" = time of possession. For other American football terms, see Glossary of American football.							33	30

=== Statistics ===
Statistic	MSU	UGA
First downs	15	15
Rushes-yards (net)	29–73	39–51
Passing yards (net)	318	288
Passes, Att-Comp-Int	51–28–3	32–20–2
Total yards	391	339
Time of Possession	28:26	31:34
