= 2011 Michigan State Spartans football team =

American college football season

2011 Michigan State Spartans football

Big Ten Legends Division champion Outback Bowl champion

Big Ten Championship Game, L 39–42 vs. Wisconsin

Outback Bowl, W 33–30 ^{3OT} vs. Georgia
- Conference: Big Ten Conference
- Legends Division

Ranking
- Coaches: No. 10
- AP: No. 11
- Record: 11–3 (7–1 Big Ten)
- Head coach: Mark Dantonio (5th season)
- Offensive coordinator: Dan Roushar (1st season)
- Defensive coordinator: Pat Narduzzi (5th season)
- Captains: Kirk Cousins; Joel Foreman; Trenton Robinson
- Home stadium: Spartan Stadium

2011 Big Ten Conference football standings
	Conf.			Overall
Team	W		L	W		L
Legends Division
No. 11 Michigan State x	7	–	1	11	–	3
No. 12 Michigan %	6	–	2	11	–	2
No. 24 Nebraska	5	–	3	9	–	4
Iowa	4	–	4	7	–	6
Northwestern	3	–	5	6	–	7
Minnesota	2	–	6	3	–	9
Leaders Division
No. 10 Wisconsin xy$	6	–	2	11	–	3
Penn State x	6	–	2	9	–	4
Purdue	4	–	4	7	–	6
Ohio State	3	–	5	6	–	7
Illinois	2	–	6	7	–	6
Indiana	0	–	8	1	–	11
Championship: Wisconsin 42, Michigan State 39
$ – BCS representative as conference champion; % – BCS at-large representative; x – Division champion/co-champions; y – Championship game participant; Rankings from AP Poll

The 2011 Michigan State Spartans football team competed on behalf of Michigan State University in the Legends Division of the Big Ten Conference during the 2011 NCAA Division I FBS football season. Head coach Mark Dantonio was in his fifth season with the Spartans. Michigan State played their home games at Spartan Stadium in East Lansing, Michigan. They finished the season 11–3, 7–1 in Big Ten play to be champions of the Legends Division. They represented the division in the inaugural Big Ten Championship Game where they lost to Leaders Division representative Wisconsin 42–39. They were invited to the Outback Bowl where they defeated Georgia 33–30 in three overtimes. Significantly, the Spartans were able to give 19 of their 20 true freshman redshirt years.

== Schedule ==
Date	Time	Opponent	Rank	Site	TV	Result	Attendance	Source
September 2	7:30 p.m.	Youngstown State*	No. 17	Spartan Stadium; East Lansing, MI	BTN	W 28–6	75,910	
September 10	12:00 p.m.	Florida Atlantic*	No. 17	Spartan Stadium; East Lansing, MI	ESPN2	W 44–0	70,249	
September 17	3:30 p.m.	at Notre Dame*	No. 15	Notre Dame Stadium; Notre Dame, IN (rivalry)	NBC	L 13–31	80,795	
September 24	12:00 p.m.	Central Michigan*		Spartan Stadium; East Lansing, MI	ESPNU	W 45–7	72,119	
October 1	3:30 p.m.	at Ohio State		Ohio Stadium; Columbus, OH	ABC	W 10–7	105,306	
October 15	12:00 p.m.	No. 11 Michigan	No. 23	Spartan Stadium; East Lansing, MI (rivalry)	ESPN	W 28–14	77,515	
October 22	8:00 p.m.	No. 4 Wisconsin^{†}	No. 15	Spartan Stadium; East Lansing, MI (College GameDay)	ESPN	W 37–31	76,405	
October 29	12:00 p.m.	at No. 13 Nebraska	No. 9	Memorial Stadium; Lincoln, NE	ESPN	L 3–24	85,641	
November 5	12:00 p.m.	Minnesota	No. 15	Spartan Stadium; East Lansing, MI	BTN	W 31–24	72,219	
November 12	12:00 p.m.	at Iowa	No. 13	Kinnick Stadium; Iowa City, IA	ESPN2	W 37–21	70,585	
November 19	12:00 p.m.	Indiana	No. 12	Spartan Stadium; East Lansing, MI (rivalry)	BTN	W 55–3	74,128	
November 26	12:00 p.m.	at Northwestern	No. 11	Ryan Field; Evanston, IL	BTN	W 31–17	32,172	
December 3	8:00 p.m.	vs. No. 15 Wisconsin*	No. 11	Lucas Oil Stadium; Indianapolis, IN (Big Ten Championship Game)	FOX	L 39–42	64,152	
January 2, 2012	1:00 p.m.	vs. No. 18 Georgia*	No. 12	Raymond James Stadium; Tampa, FL (Outback Bowl)	ABC	W 33–30 ^{3OT}	49,429	
*Non-conference game; ^{†}Homecoming; Rankings from AP Poll released prior to the game; All times are in Eastern time

== Game summaries ==
=== Youngstown State ===
Youngstown State at Michigan State

Team	1	2	3	4	Total
Youngstown State	0	6	0	0	6
• Michigan State	0	14	7	7	28

- Date: September 2
- Location: Spartan Stadium, East Lansing, MI
- Game start: 7:38 p.m. EDT
- Elapsed time: 3:11
- Game attendance: 75,910
- Game weather: 82 °F (28 °C), Wind 3 mph (4.8 km/h) SW, Partly Cloudy
- Referee: Alex Kamp
- TV announcers (BTN):
  Tom Hart (Play-by-Play)
  Derek Rackley (Analyst)
  Lisa Byington (Sideline)

Scoring summary
2	12:04	MSU	Larry Caper 6-yard run (Dan Conroy kick)	MSU 7-0
2	7:38	YSU	Jelani Berassa 10-yard pass from Kurt Hess (kick failed)	MSU 7-6
2	5:47	MSU	Le'Veon Bell 3-yard run (Dan Conroy kick)	MSU 14-6
3	4:52	MSU	B.J. Cunningham 18-yard pass from Kirk Cousins (Dan Conroy kick)	MSU 21-6
4	7:09	MSU	Le'Veon Bell 3-yard run (Dan Conroy kick)	MSU 28-6

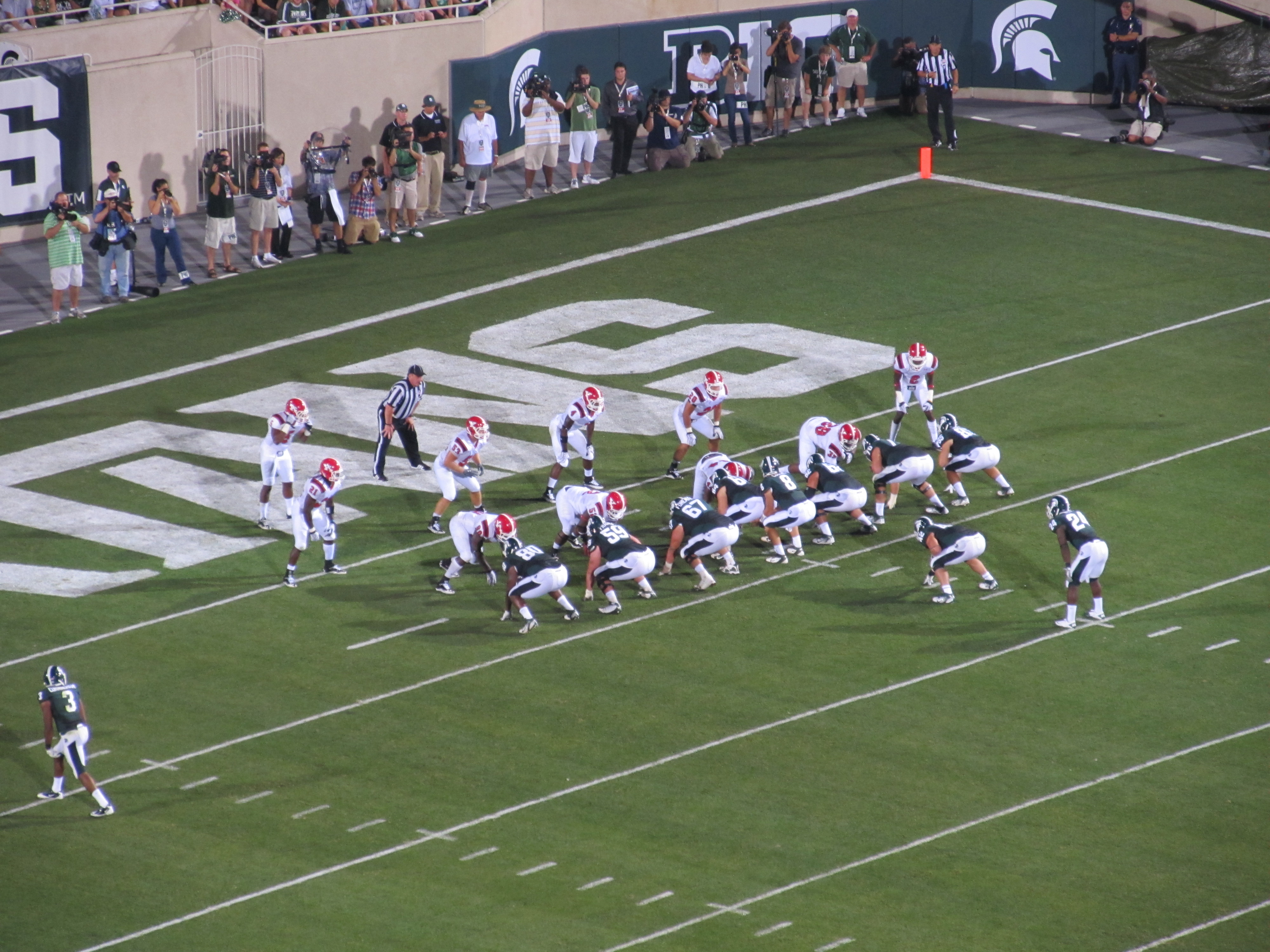
Michigan State vs. Youngstown State

=== Florida Atlantic ===
Florida Atlantic at Michigan State

Team	1	2	3	4	Total
Florida Atlantic	0	0	0	0	0
• Michigan State	14	13	7	10	44

- Date: September 10
- Location:
  Spartan Stadium
  East Lansing, MI
- Game start: 12:01 p.m. EDT
- Elapsed time: 2:56
- Game attendance: 70,249
- Game weather: 69 °F (21 °C), Wind 3 mph (4.8 km/h) NNE, Partly Cloudy
- Referee: Dave Witvoet
- TV announcers (ESPN2):
  Beth Mowins (Play-by-Play)
  Mike Bellotti (Analyst)

The Spartans earned their first shutout since 2008, which was also against FAU in a 17–0 win.

=== Notre Dame ===
Michigan State at Notre Dame
(Megaphone Trophy)

Team	1	2	3	4	Total
Michigan State	3	7	0	3	13
• Notre Dame	14	7	7	3	31

- Date: September 17
- Location:
  Notre Dame Stadium
  South Bend, IN
- Game start: 3:41 p.m. EDT
- Elapsed time: 3:19
- Game attendance: 80,795
- Game weather: 68 °F (20 °C), Wind 9 mph (14 km/h) SE, Sunny
- Referee: John O'Neill
- TV announcers (NBC):
  Tom Hammond (Play-by-Play)
  Mike Mayock (Analyst)
  Alex Flanagan (Sideline)

=== Central Michigan ===
Central Michigan at Michigan State

Team	1	2	3	4	Total
Central Michigan	0	0	7	0	7
• Michigan State	7	24	7	7	45

- Date: September 24
- Location:
  Spartan Stadium
  East Lansing, MI
- Game start: 12:01 p.m. EDT
- Elapsed time: 3:07
- Game attendance: 72,119
- Game weather: 61 °F (16 °C), Wind 5 mph (8.0 km/h) SSE, Mostly Sunny
- Referee: Todd Geerlings
- TV announcers (ESPNU):
  Pam Ward (Play-by-Play)
  Dan Hawkins (Analyst)

=== Ohio State ===
Michigan State at Ohio State

Team	1	2	3	4	Total
• Michigan State	7	0	0	3	10
Ohio State	0	0	0	7	7

- Date: October 5
- Location:
  Ohio Stadium
  Columbus, OH
- Game start: 3:37 EDT
- Elapsed time: 3:11
- Game attendance: 105306
- Game weather: 48 °F (9 °C), Wind 10 mph (16 km/h) NNW, Overcast
- Referee: Scott McElwee
- TV announcers (ABC/ESPN):
  Sean McDonough (Play-by-Play)
  Matt Millen (Analyst)
  Heather Cox (Sideline)

The Spartans were 16 seconds from their 2nd shutout of the year, but a touchdown pass put the Buckeyes on the board. Michigan State recovered the onside kick securing the victory, their first against Ohio State in 7 meetings.

=== Michigan ===
Michigan at Michigan State
(Paul Bunyan Trophy)

Team	1	2	3	4	Total
Michigan	7	0	0	7	14
• Michigan State	7	0	14	7	28

- Date: October 15
- Location:
  Spartan Stadium
  East Lansing, MI
- Game start: 12:01 EDT
- Elapsed time: 3:27
- Game attendance: 77,515
- Game weather: 50 °F (10 °C), Wind 24 mph (39 km/h) WNW, Mostly Cloudy
- Referee: Bill LeMonnier
- TV announcers (ESPN):
  Dave Pasch (Play-by-Play)
  Urban Meyer (Analyst)
  Chris Spielman (Analyst)
  Quint Kessenich (Sideline)

Scoring summary
1	8:50	MICH	Denard Robinson 15-yard run (Brendan Gibbons kick)	MICH 7-0
1	5:08	MSU	Edwin Baker 1-yard run (Dan Conroy kick)	Tied 7-7
3	11:07	MSU	Keshawn Martin 10-yard pass from Kirk Cousins (Dan Conroy kick)	MSU 14-7
3	0:25	MSU	Keshawn Martin 13-yard pass from Kirk Cousins (Dan Conroy kick)	MSU 21-7
4	9:49	MICH	Roy Roundtree 34-yard pass from Denard Robinson (Brendan Gibbons kick)	MSU 21-14
4	4:31	MSU	Isaiah Lewis 39-yard interception return (Dan Conroy kick)	MSU 28-14

Mark Dantonio and his Spartans earned their fourth straight victory over arch-rival Michigan. MSU's defense shut down quarterback Denard Robinson and sealed the victory on safety Isaiah Lewis' interception return for a touchdown. The Spartans wore unique Nike Pro Combat uniforms for the game.

=== Wisconsin ===
Wisconsin at Michigan State

Team	1	2	3	4	Total
Wisconsin	14	0	3	14	31
• Michigan State	0	23	0	14	37

- Date: October 22
- Location:
  Spartan Stadium
  East Lansing, MI
- Game start: 8:06 p.m. EDT
- Elapsed time: 3:23
- Game attendance: 76,405
- Game weather: 50 °F (10 °C), Wind: Calm, Partly Cloudy
- Referee: Dennis Lipski
- TV announcers (ESPN):
  Brent Musburger (Play-by-Play)
  Kirk Herbstreit (Analyst)
  Erin Andrews (Sideline)

Scoring summary
1	8:48	WIS	Jacob Pedersen 9-yard pass from Russell Wilson (Philip Welch kick)	WIS 7-0
1	7:42	WIS	Montee Ball 9-yard run (Philip Welch kick)	WIS 14-0
2	13:10	MSU	Safety, Russell Wilson tackled by Denicos Allen in end zone	WIS 14-2
2	11:22	MSU	Keshawn Martin 34-yard run (Dan Conroy kick)	WIS 14-9
2	1:20	MSU	B.J. Cunningham 35-yard pass from Kirk Cousins (Dan Conroy kick)	MSU 16-14
2	0:37	MSU	Bennie Fowler recovered blocked punt in end zone (Dan Conroy kick)	MSU 23-14
3	8:29	WIS	Philip Welch 33-yard field goal	MSU 23-17
4	10:58	MSU	Keshawn Martin 15-yard pass from Kirk Cousins (Kirk Cousins to B.J. Cunningham pass)	MSU 31-17
4	8:10	WIS	Russell Wilson 22-yard run (Philip Welch kick)	MSU 31-24
4	1:26	WIS	Montee Ball 2-yard pass from Russell Wilson (Philip Welch kick)	Tied 31-31
4	0:00	MSU	Keith Nichol 44-yard pass from Kirk Cousins (no kick)	MSU 37-31

Michigan State found themselves down 14–0 early in the first quarter after two quick Wisconsin drives. Momentum turned at the beginning of the second quarter, when Russell Wilson committed an intentional grounding penalty in the endzone, resulting in a safety and two points for the Spartans. A subsequent touchdown made the score 14–9 UW. On Wisconsin's next possession, they marched down to the Michigan State 13-yard line, but their field goal attempt was blocked. MSU recovered and drove down the field to make it 16–14 MSU. With the second quarter clock running down, Wisconsin punted it away, but this too was blocked and recovered in the endzone for a Michigan State touchdown, making the halftime score 23–14 Spartans.
With 8:40 to play in the 4th quarter, the Badgers found themselves down 31–17. A quick score made it 31–24. The teams traded possessions and Wisconsin got the ball back with 4:28 to play. The Badgers marched down the field once again and tied the game at 31–31 with 1:26 to play.
Michigan State started the next drive at their own 22. After a first down QB Kirk Cousins was sacked for a ten-yard loss, and Wisconsin then called a timeout with 00:42 left. Following a twelve-yard pass to make a 3rd and 8 situation, it appeared Michigan State was willing to let the clock run out and take the game into overtime. However, Wisconsin called timeout again with 00:30 left. The Spartans completed passes of 11 and 9 yards on their next two plays to get to the Wisconsin 44-yard line and then called timeout with 00:10 to go. After an incomplete pass four seconds remained on the clock.
Michigan State lined up in a shotgun formation. Kirk Cousins took the snap and rolled out to the right before launching a Hail Mary to the endzone. Waiting there was BJ Cunningham, but he was screened by Wisconsin player Jared Abbrederis who had jumped too early to try to deflect the ball. The ball made it to Cunningham but went off his facemask, bouncing into the hands of Keith Nichol who was at the one-yard line. As Nichol fought to cross the goal line, he was met by two Badgers attempting to keep him out. After the whistles blew, the officials marked the ball at the one foot line, sending the game to overtime as the clock had run out. Then a call came down from the review booth to look at the play again on replay. After review, the officials found "The runner did cross the line", and Spartan Stadium erupted in celebration.
In the post game interview on the field, Dantonio was asked what the play call was, replying with "It's a Rocket play. You know, throw it in the endzone, let it be tipped around and see who comes up with it." It was the third game in two years to be labeled by a play name, with Rocket joining the 2010 games of Little Giants (Notre Dame fake field goal) and Mousetrap (Northwestern fake punt).

=== Nebraska ===
Michigan State at Nebraska

Team	1	2	3	4	Total
Michigan State	0	3	0	0	3
• Nebraska	10	0	14	0	24

- Date: October 29
- Location:
  Memorial Stadium
  Lincoln, NE
- Game start: 12:02 EDT
- Elapsed time: 3:14
- Game attendance: 85641
- Game weather: 45 °F (7 °C), Wind 5–10 mph (8.0–16.1 km/h) S, Sunny
- Referee: Dan Capron
- TV announcers (ESPN):
  Dave Pasch (Play-by-Play)
  Urban Meyer (Analyst)
  Chris Spielman (Analyst)
  Quint Kessenich (Sideline)

=== Minnesota ===
Minnesota at Michigan State

Team	1	2	3	4	Total
Minnesota	14	3	7	0	24
• Michigan State	7	14	0	10	31

- Date: November 5
- Location:
  Spartan Stadium
  East Lansing, MI
- Game start: 12:00 p.m. EDT
- Elapsed time: 3:21
- Game attendance: 72,219
- Game weather: 43 °F (6 °C), Wind 9 mph (14 km/h) SSE, Sunny
- Referee: John O'Neill
- TV announcers (BTN):
  Matt Devlin (Play-by-Play)
  Glen Mason (Analyst)
  Jon Jansen (Sideline)

=== Iowa ===
Michigan State at Iowa

Team	1	2	3	4	Total
• Michigan State	14	17	3	3	37
Iowa	0	7	14	0	21

- Date: November 12
- Location:
  Kinnick Stadium
  Iowa City, IA
- Game start: 12:00 p.m. EST
- Elapsed time: 3:35
- Game attendance: 70,585
- Game weather: 51 °F (11 °C), Wind 12 mph (19 km/h) S, Partly Cloudy
- Referee: Dave Witvoet
- TV announcers (ESPN2):
  Beth Mowins (Play-by-Play)
  Mike Bellotti (Analyst)
  Quint Kessenich (Sideline)

Scoring summary
1	9:17	MSU	B.J. Cunningham 6-yard pass from Kirk Cousins (Dan Conroy kick)	MSU 7-0
1	7:37	MSU	Edwin Baker 17-yard pass from Kirk Cousins (Dan Conroy kick)	MSU 14-0
2	14:53	IOWA	C.J. Fiedorowicz 8-yard pass from James Vandenberg (Mike Meyer kick)	MSU 14-7
2	7:37	MSU	Dan Conroy 22-yard field goal	MSU 17-7
2	1:57	MSU	Le'Veon Bell 25-yard run (Dan Conroy kick)	MSU 24-7
2	1:21	MSU	B.J. Cunningham 22-yard pass from Kirk Cousins (Dan Conroy kick)	MSU 31-7
3	8:31	MSU	Dan Conroy 31-yard field goal	MSU 34-7
3	5:39	IOWA	Marvin McNutt 3-yard pass from James Vandenberg (Mike Meyer kick)	MSU 34-14
3	0:49	IOWA	Marcus Coker 2-yard run (Mike Meyer kick)	MSU 34-21
4	5:11	MSU	Dan Conroy 48-yard field goal	MSU 37-21

The Spartans earned their first victory in Kinnick Stadium since 1989.

=== Indiana ===
Indiana at Michigan State
(Old Brass Spittoon)

Team	1	2	3	4	Total
Indiana	0	3	0	0	3
• Michigan State	17	17	14	7	55

- Date: November 19
- Location:
  Spartan Stadium
  East Lansing, MI
- Game start: 12:01 p.m. EST
- Elapsed time: 3:05
- Game attendance: 74,128
- Game weather: 46 °F (8 °C), Wind 15 mph (24 km/h) SSW, Overcast
- Referee: Bill LeMonnier
- TV announcers (BTN):
  Eric Collins (Sideline)
  Chris Martin (Analyst)
  Dionne Miller (Sideline)

Scoring summary
1	10:07	MSU	Dan Conroy 21-yard field goal	MSU 3-0
1	6:24	MSU	B.J. Cunningham 63-yard pass from Kirk Cousins (Dan Conroy kick)	MSU 10-0
1	2:09	MSU	Keshawn Martin 47-yard pass from Kirk Cousins (Dan Conroy kick)	MSU 17-0
2	10:44	IND	Mitch Ewald 22-yard field goal	MSU 17-3
2	10:06	MSU	Keshawn Martin 19-yard run (Dan Conroy kick)	MSU 24-3
2	5:17	MSU	Edwin Baker 10-yard run (Dan Conroy kick)	MSU 31-3
2	0:48	MSU	Dan Conroy 22-yard field goal	MSU 34-3
3	11:35	MSU	B.J. Cunningham 7-yard pass from Kirk Cousins (Dan Conroy kick)	MSU 41-3
3	7:37	MSU	Johnny Adams 86-yard interception return (Dan Conroy kick)	MSU 48-3
4	14:28	MSU	Edwin Baker 3-yard run (Dan Conroy kick)	MSU 55-3

Win clinched at least share of Legends Division. The title became outright later in the day when Michigan defeated Nebraska.

=== Northwestern ===
Michigan State at Northwestern

Team	1	2	3	4	Total
• Michigan State	3	14	7	7	31
Northwestern	0	3	7	7	17

- Date: November 26
- Location:
  Ryan Field
  Evanston, IL
- Game start: 12:01 p.m. EST
- Elapsed time: 3:02
- Game attendance: 32,172
- Game weather: 54 °F (12 °C), Wind 13 mph (21 km/h) SSW, Light Rain
- Referee: Dan Capron
- TV announcers (BTN):
  Eric Collins (Play-by-Play)
  Chris Martin (Analyst)
  Dionne Miller (Sideline)

Michigan State secured sole possession of the Legends Division championship with the victory.

=== Wisconsin (Big Ten Championship Game) ===
Wisconsin vs Michigan State
(Big Ten Championship Game)

Team	1	2	3	4	Total
• Wisconsin	21	0	7	14	42
Michigan State	7	22	7	3	39

- Date: December 3
- Location:
  Lucas Oil Stadium
  Indianapolis, IN
- Game start: 8:19 p.m. EST
- Elapsed time: 3:33
- Game attendance: 64,152
- Game weather: Indoors (retractable roof closed)
- Referee: Bill LeMonnier
- TV announcers (FOX):
  Gus Johnson (Play-by-Play)
  Charles Davis (Analyst)
  Tim Brewster (Sideline)

=== Georgia (Outback Bowl) ===
Michigan State vs Georgia
(Outback Bowl)

Team	1	2	3	4	OT	2OT	3OT	Total
• Michigan State	0	0	14	13	0	3	3	33
Georgia	2	14	0	11	0	3	0	30

- Date: January 2
- Location: Raymond James Stadium, Tampa, FL
- Game start: 1:00 p.m. EST
- Elapsed time: 4:10
- Game attendance: 49,429
- Game weather: 65 °F (18 °C), Wind 12 mph (19 km/h) NW, Clear Skies
- Referee: Ed Ardito (Conference USA)
- TV announcers (ABC):
  Mike Tirico (Play-by-Play)
  Jon Gruden (Analyst)
  Jenn Brown (Sideline)

Scoring summary
1	12:07	UGA	Safety, Keshawn Martin tackled by Brandon Boykin in end zone	UGA 2-0
2	3:06	UGA	Tavarres King 80-yard pass from Aaron Murray (Blair Walsh kick)	UGA 9-0
2	1:39	UGA	Brandon Boykin 92-yard punt return (Blair Walsh kick)	UGA 16-0
3	7:52	MSU	Le'Veon Bell 8-yard run (Kirk Cousins to Brian Linthicum pass)	UGA 16-8
3	1:47	MSU	Darqueze Dennard 38-yard interception return (pass failed)	UGA 16-14
4	9:58	UGA	Blair Walsh 32-yard field goal	UGA 19-14
4	8:22	MSU	Keith Nichol 7-yard pass from Kirk Cousins (pass failed)	MSU 20-19
4	6:44	UGA	Brandon Boykin 13-yard pass from Aaron Murray (Aaron Murray to Malcolm Mitchell pass)	UGA 27-20
4	0:14	MSU	Le'Veon Bell 1-yard run (Dan Conroy kick)	Tied 27-27
2OT		UGA	Blair Walsh 47-yard field goal	UGA 30-27
2OT		MSU	Dan Conroy 35-yard field goal	Tied 30-30
3OT		MSU	Dan Conroy 28-yard field goal	MSU 33-30

The Spartans played their first overtime game since Notre Dame in 2010, and their first triple overtime game since 2004. Prior to overtime, the Spartans had a ten-play, 85-yard drive that tied the game at 27 with nineteen seconds left and sent the game into overtime. In the first overtime, Kirk Cousins threw an interception to end MSU's possession, but Georgia kicker Blair Walsh missed a 42-yard field goal to allow the game to continue into a second extra period. The teams traded field goals in the second overtime, and Michigan State opened the third overtime with a 28-yard field goal by Dan Conroy. On the final play of the game, Walsh's 47-yard kick was blocked by Anthony Rashad White, giving the Spartans a 33–30 victory. It was Coach Dantonio's first bowl victory with Michigan State, and Michigan State's first bowl victory since the 2001 Silicon Valley Bowl.

== Roster ==
2011 Michigan State Spartans football team roster
Players
Coaches
Offense

Pos.	#	Name	Class
C	66	Jack Allen	Fr
FB	42	Todd Anderson	Sr
QB	12	Peter Badovinac	Jr
RB	4	Edwin Baker	Jr
RB	24	Le'Veon Bell	So
FB	45	Jeff Bobek	Jr
OT	70	Skyler Burkland	Fr
WR	11	Juwan Caesar	Fr
RB	22	Larry Caper	Jr
TE	85	Garrett Celek	Sr
OL	76	Donavon Clark	Fr
OT	73	Henry Conway	So
QB	18	Connor Cook	Fr
QB	8	Kirk Cousins	Sr
WR	3	B. J. Cunningham	Sr
OT	65	Michael Dennis	Fr
G	71	John Deyo	Jr
OT	51	Fou Fonoti	Jr
G	67	Joel Foreman	Sr
WR	13	Bennie Fowler	So
OT	59	Dan France	So
TE	92	Andrew Gleichert	Fr
RB	20	Nick Hill	Fr
TE	84	Derek Hoebing	So
G	74	Zach Hueter	Jr
C	63	Travis Jackson	Fr
OL	69	Shawn Kamm	Fr
C	72	Nate Klatt	So
OL	54	Connor Kruse	Fr
WR	23	Takudzwa Kubvoruno	Fr
TE	83	Paul Lang	Fr
TE	88	Brian Linthicum	Sr
G	53	Kyle Lints	Fr
WR	82	Keshawn Martin	Sr
QB	10	Andrew Maxwell	So
G	62	Chris McDonald	Jr
OT	75	Jared McGaha	Sr
WR	25	Keith Mumphery	Fr
WR	7	Keith Nichol	Sr
WR	17	Kyle Nichol	So
FB	38	Niko Palazeti	Fr
FB	37	Trevon Pendleton	Fr
G	73	Arthur Ray Jr.	Sr
WR	16	Chris D. Rucker	Sr
C	68	Ethan Ruhland	Jr
FB	47	Adam Setterbo	Sr
TE	80	Dion Sims	So
WR	21	Andre Sims Jr.	Fr
WR	81	Brad Sonntag	Sr
TE	48	Drew Stevens	Jr
C/OG	64	Blake Treadwell	Jr
QB	19	A.J. Troup	Fr
QB	16	Tommy Vento	Fr

Defense

Pos.	#	Name	Class
CB	5	Johnny Adams	Jr
LB	28	Denicos Allen	So
LB	40	Max Bullough	So
DE	94	Taylor Calero	Fr
DE	89	Shilique Calhoun	Fr
DL	87	Brandon Clemons	Fr
CB	36	Arjen Colquhoun	Fr
DT	65	Doug Curtis	Jr
LB	54	Nestor Padilla	Fr
CB	31	Darqueze Dennard	So
CB	12	Dana Dixon	So
DE	52	Denzel Drone	So
S	27	Kurtis Drummond	Fr
DB	29	Spencer Elliott	Fr
LB	41	Kyler Elsworth	So
S	19	Danny Folino	So
DE	55	Corey Freeman	Jr
LB	47	Jeremy Gainer	So
LB	50	Steve Gardiner	Jr
LB	2	William Gholston	So
LB	42	Ty Hamilton	Fr
LB	49	TyQuan Hammock	So
LB	45	Darien Harris	Fr
DE	92	Joel Heath	Fr
CB	6	Mylan Hicks	Fr
DE	91	Tyler Hoover	Jr
NT	61	Antonio Jeremiah	Jr
S	23	Jairus Jones	So
LB	34	Taiwan Jones	Fr
DL	81	James Kittredge	So
DE	93	Damon Knox	Fr
DB	35	Chris Laneaux	Fr
CB	33	Jeremy Langford	Fr
S	9	Isaiah Lewis	So
CB	14	Tony Lippett	Fr
LB	54	Nestor Padilla	Jr
DL	69	Blake Pacheco	Sr
NT	96	Kevin Pickelman	Sr
DT	56	Matt Ramondo	Fr
NT	60	Micajah Reynolds	So
LB	48	Pat Rhomberg	Fr
S	39	Trenton Robinson	Sr
LB	54	Nestor Padilla	Fr
NT	58	Jordan Sanders	Fr
DT	97	Mark Scarpinato	Fr
DT	57	Jonathan Strayhorn	Sr
LB	8	Lawrence Thomas	Fr
CB	15	Trae Waynes	Fr
NT	98	Anthony Rashad White	Jr
CB	32	Mitchell White	Jr
S	26	R.J. Williamson	Fr
DT	99	Jerel Worthy	Jr

Special teams

Pos.	#	Name	Class
K	4	Dan Conroy	Jr
LS	58	Matt Giampapa	Fr
LS	51	Steve Moore	So
K	17	Kevin Muma	So
P	3	Mike Sadler	Fr
P	20	Kyle Selden	Sr

Head coach

- Mark Dantonio

Coordinators/assistant coaches

- Pat Narduzzi – Defensive Coordinator
- Dan Roushar – Offensive Coordinator
- Harlon Barnett – Secondary
- Ted Gill – Defensive Line
- Brad Salem – Running Backs/Recruiting Coordinator
- Terrence Samuel – Wide Receivers
- Mark Staten – Offensive Line
- Mike Tressel – Linebackers/Special Teams
- Dave Warner – Quarterbacks

Legend

- (C) Team captain
- (S) Suspended
- (I) Ineligible
- Injured
- Redshirt

Roster

== Rankings ==
Ranking movements Legend: ██ Increase in ranking ██ Decrease in ranking RV = Received votes
	Week															
Poll	Pre	1	2	3	4	5	6	7	8	9	10	11	12	13	14	Final
AP	17	17	15	RV	RV	RV	23	15	9	15	13	12	11	11	12	11
Coaches	17	16	15	23	25	20	19	13	10	16	13	12	10	9	13	10
Harris	Not released						22	15	11	17	13	12	11	11	13	Not released
BCS	Not released							16	11	17	17	15	14	13	17	Not released
