= 2011 Indiana Hoosiers football team =

American college football season

2011 Indiana Hoosiers football
- Conference: Big Ten Conference
- Leaders Division
- Record: 1–11 (0–8 Big Ten)
- Head coach: Kevin Wilson (1st season)
- Co-offensive coordinators: Kevin Johns (1st season); Rod Smith (1st season)
- Offensive scheme: Multiple
- Co-defensive coordinators: Mike Ekeler (1st season); Doug Mallory (1st season)
- Base defense: 4–3
- Captains: Max Dedmond; Adam Replogle
- Home stadium: Memorial Stadium

2011 Big Ten Conference football standings
	Conf.			Overall
Team	W		L	W		L
Legends Division
No. 11 Michigan State x	7	–	1	11	–	3
No. 12 Michigan %	6	–	2	11	–	2
No. 24 Nebraska	5	–	3	9	–	4
Iowa	4	–	4	7	–	6
Northwestern	3	–	5	6	–	7
Minnesota	2	–	6	3	–	9
Leaders Division
No. 10 Wisconsin xy$	6	–	2	11	–	3
Penn State x	6	–	2	9	–	4
Purdue	4	–	4	7	–	6
Ohio State	3	–	5	6	–	7
Illinois	2	–	6	7	–	6
Indiana	0	–	8	1	–	11
Championship: Wisconsin 42, Michigan State 39
$ – BCS representative as conference champion; % – BCS at-large representative; x – Division champion/co-champions; y – Championship game participant; Rankings from AP Poll

The 2011 Indiana Hoosiers football team represented Indiana University Bloomington during the 2011 NCAA Division I FBS football season in the new Leaders Division of the Big Ten Conference. The 2011 season was the first for new head coach Kevin Wilson, formerly the offensive coordinator at Oklahoma. The Hoosiers played their home games at Memorial Stadium in Bloomington, Indiana. They finished the season 1–11, 0–8 in Big Ten play to place last in the Leaders Division.

== Before the season ==
The Hoosiers entered the season with a new outlook on the football program, after athletic director Fred Glass fired former head coach Bill Lynch and his staff and brought in Oklahoma offensive coordinator Kevin Wilson. To complete his staff, Wilson hired Kevin Johns (Northwestern) and Rod Smith (Michigan) as co-offensive coordinators and Mike Ekeler (Nebraska) and Doug Mallory (New Mexico, LSU) as co-defensive coordinators. The massive turnover in staff lead to a number of changes in team and player personnel. The main position battle heading into the season was at quarterback, with three main candidates (RS sophomores Edward Wright-Baker and Dusty Kiel and true freshman Tre Roberson) were competing to replace senior Ben Chappell, who led the Big Ten in passing the season before.

=== Recruiting ===
College recruiting (2011)
Name	Hometown	School	Height	Weight	Commit date
Matt Dooley; LS/TE	Phoenix, AZ	Scottsdale Christian	6 ft 5 in (1.96 m)	260 lb (120 kg)	Apr 3, 2011
Matt Dooley; LS/TE	Recruit ratings: Scout: Rivals: (NR)				
Peyton Eckert; OL	Mount Prospect, IL	Prospect	6 ft 6 in (1.98 m)	285 lb (129 kg)	Jan 30, 2011
Peyton Eckert; OL	Recruit ratings: Scout: Rivals: (75)				
Ralston Evans; OL	Indianapolis, IN	Arlington	6 ft 4 in (1.93 m)	275 lb (125 kg)	Apr 17, 2010
Ralston Evans; OL	Recruit ratings: Scout: Rivals: (74)				
Forisse Hardin; DB	Louisville, KY	Ballard	6 ft 5 in (1.96 m)	260 lb (120 kg)	Jul 1, 2010
Forisse Hardin; DB	Recruit ratings: Scout: Rivals: (74)				
Stephen Houston; RB	Independence, KS	Independence CC	6 ft 0 in (1.83 m)	220 lb (100 kg)	Jul 7, 2011
Stephen Houston; RB	Recruit ratings: Scout: Rivals: (NR)				
Michael Hunter; DB	Monroe, LA	West Monroe	6 ft 1 in (1.85 m)	168 lb (76 kg)	Jan 25, 2011
Michael Hunter; DB	Recruit ratings: Scout: Rivals: (74)				
David Kaminski; OG	Strongsville, OH	West Monroe	6 ft 4 in (1.93 m)	275 lb (125 kg)	Jan 30, 2011
David Kaminski; OG	Recruit ratings: Scout: Rivals: (45)				
Kyle Kennedy; LB	Indianapolis, IN	Cathedral	6 ft 3 in (1.91 m)	216 lb (98 kg)	Apr 17, 2010
Kyle Kennedy; LB	Recruit ratings: Scout: Rivals: (76)				
Cody Latimer; WR	Dayton, OH	Jefferson	6 ft 3 in (1.91 m)	210 lb (95 kg)	Oct 4, 2010
Cody Latimer; WR	Recruit ratings: Scout: Rivals: (73)				
Gregory Lewis; OL	Hollywood, FL	Chaminade-Madonna	6 ft 5 in (1.96 m)	300 lb (140 kg)	Jan 30, 2011
Gregory Lewis; OL	Recruit ratings: Scout: Rivals: (73)				
Jay McCants; WR	Cincinnati, OH	Princeton	6 ft 5 in (1.96 m)	207 lb (94 kg)	Jun 23, 2010
Jay McCants; WR	Recruit ratings: Scout: Rivals: (75)				
Kenny Mullen; DB	Fort Wayne, IN	Bishop Luers	5 ft 10 in (1.78 m)	158 lb (72 kg)	Jun 17, 2010
Kenny Mullen; DB	Recruit ratings: Scout: Rivals: (74)				
Mark Murphy; DB	Akron, OH	St. Vincent – St. Mary	5 ft 10 in (1.78 m)	158 lb (72 kg)	Jun 17, 2010
Mark Murphy; DB	Recruit ratings: Scout: Rivals: (75)				
Adarius Rayner; DT	Largo, FL	Largo	6 ft 2 in (1.88 m)	260 lb (120 kg)	Jan 30, 2011
Adarius Rayner; DT	Recruit ratings: Scout: Rivals: (45)				
Jake Reed; TE	Columbus, IN	Columbus North	6 ft 4 in (1.93 m)	231 lb (105 kg)	Apr 5, 2010
Jake Reed; TE	Recruit ratings: Scout: Rivals: (77)				
Mike Replogle; LB	Centerville, OH	Centerville	6 ft 2 in (1.88 m)	210 lb (95 kg)	Apr 5, 2010
Mike Replogle; LB	Recruit ratings: Scout: Rivals: (77)				
Bobby Richardson; DT	Tampa, FL	Plant	6 ft 3 in (1.91 m)	265 lb (120 kg)	Jan 30, 2011
Bobby Richardson; DT	Recruit ratings: Scout: Rivals: (45)				
Tre Roberson; QB	Indianapolis, IN	Lawrence Central	6 ft 1 in (1.85 m)	170 lb (77 kg)	Apr 10, 2010
Tre Roberson; QB	Recruit ratings: Scout: Rivals: (76)				
D'Angelo Roberts; RB	Bloomington, IN	Bloomington North	5 ft 10 in (1.78 m)	180 lb (82 kg)	Jul 13, 2010
D'Angelo Roberts; RB	Recruit ratings: Scout: Rivals: (77)				
Zack Shaw; LB	Coshocton, OH	Coshocton	6 ft 3 in (1.91 m)	218 lb (99 kg)	Apr 16, 2010
Zack Shaw; LB	Recruit ratings: Scout: Rivals: (76)				
Nick Stoner; DB	Greenwood, IN	Center Grove	6 ft 1 in (1.85 m)	170 lb (77 kg)	Jun 16, 2010
Nick Stoner; DB	Recruit ratings: Scout: Rivals: (74)				
Bernard Taylor; DT	Macomb, MI	Dakota	6 ft 2 in (1.88 m)	281 lb (127 kg)	Jan 16, 2011
Bernard Taylor; DT	Recruit ratings: Scout: Rivals: (76)				
Shane Wynn; WR	Cleveland, OH	Glenville	5 ft 6 in (1.68 m)	147 lb (67 kg)	Feb 2, 2011
Shane Wynn; WR	Recruit ratings: Scout: Rivals: (79)				
Overall recruit ranking: Scout: 52
Note: In many cases, Scout, Rivals, 247Sports, On3, and ESPN may conflict in their listings of height and weight.; In these cases, the average was taken. ESPN grades are on a 100-point scale.; Sources: "Indiana Football Commitments". Rivals.; "2011 Indiana Football Commits". Scout.; "ESPN". ESPN.; "Scout.com Team Recruiting Rankings". Scout.; "2011 Team Ranking". Rivals.com.

== Schedule ==
Date	Time	Opponent	Site	TV	Result	Attendance
September 3	7:00 pm	vs. Ball State*	Lucas Oil Stadium; Indianapolis, IN	ESPN3	L 20–27	40,224
September 10	7:00 pm	Virginia*	Memorial Stadium; Bloomington, IN	BTN	L 31–34	41,549
September 17	3:30 pm	No. 25 (FCS) South Carolina State*	Memorial Stadium; Bloomington, IN	BTN	W 38–21	41,203
September 24	7:00 pm	at North Texas*	Apogee Stadium; Denton, TX	ESPN3	L 21–24	21,181
October 1	12:00 pm	Penn State	Memorial Stadium; Bloomington, IN	ESPNU	L 10–16	42,621
October 8	2:30 pm	No. 19 Illinois	Memorial Stadium; Bloomington, IN (rivalry)	BTN	L 20–41	41,665
October 15	12:00 pm	at No. 4 Wisconsin	Camp Randall Stadium; Madison, WI	ESPN2	L 7–59	80,732
October 22	12:00 pm	at Iowa	Kinnick Stadium; Iowa City, IA	BTN	L 24–45	70,585
October 29	12:00 pm	Northwestern^{†}	Memorial Stadium; Bloomington, IN	BTN	L 38–59	39,239
November 5	12:00 pm	at Ohio State	Ohio Stadium; Columbus, OH	BTN	L 20–34	105,159
November 19	12:00 pm	at No. 12 Michigan State	Spartan Stadium; East Lansing, MI (rivalry)	BTN	L 3–55	74,128
November 26	3:30 pm	Purdue	Memorial Stadium; Bloomington, IN (Old Oaken Bucket)	BTN	L 25–33	42,005
*Non-conference game; ^{†}Homecoming; Rankings from Coaches' Poll released prior to the game; All times are in Eastern time

== Personnel ==
=== Coaching staff ===
Name	Position
Kevin Wilson	Head coach/tight ends coach
Kevin Johns	Co-offensive coordinator/wide receivers coach
Rod Smith	Co-offensive coordinator/quarterbacks coach
Mike Ekeler	Co-defensive coordinator/linebackers coach
Doug Mallory	Co-defensive coordinator/safeties coach
Mark Hagen	Special teams coordinator/defensive tackles coach
Brett Dierson	Recruiting coordinator/defensive ends coach
Greg Frey	Offensive line coach
Deland McCullough	Running backs coach
Brandon Shelby	Cornerbacks coach
Jeff Sims	Quality control recruiting coach

=== Roster ===
(as of 8/07/2011)
Quarterbacks: 5 Tre Roberson – Freshman; 7 Edward Wright-Baker – (redshirt) Sophomore; 8 Dusty Kiel – (redshirt) Sophomore; 14 Adam Follett – (redshirt) Junior; 17 Teddy Schell – (redshirt) Senior; Wide receivers: 1 Shane Wynn – Freshman; 3 Cody Latimer – Freshman; 13 Kofi Hughes – Sophomore; 15 Jay McCants – Freshman; 19 Connor Creevey – (redshirt) Junior; 23 Brett Martin – (redshirt) Sophomore; 80 Logan Young – (redshirt) Freshman; 81 Duwyce Wilson – (redshirt) Sophomore; 82 Dre Muhammad – (redshirt) Senior; 84 Jamonne Chester – (redshirt) Sophomore; 88 Damarlo Belcher – Senior; 89 Tim O'Conner – (redshirt) Freshman; Offensive line: 50 Steve Fiacable – (redshirt) Sophomore; 57 Pete Bachman – (redshirt) Freshman; 58 Tyler McGuigan – (redshirt) Sophomore; 59 Peyton Eckert – Freshman; 60 Will Matte – (redshirt) Junior; 62 Ralston Evans – Freshman; 64 Collin Rahrig – (redshirt) Freshman; 65 Marc Damisch – (redshirt) Junior; 67 Pat McShane – (redshirt) Sophomore; 68 David Kaminiski – Freshman; 70 Justin Pagan – Senior; 71 Bill Ivan – (redshirt) Freshman; 72 Andrew McDonald – (redshirt) Senior; 74 Charlie Chapman – (redshirt) Sophomore; 76 Cody Evers – (redshirt) Freshman; 77 Josh Hager – (redshirt) Senior; 79 Gregory Lewis – Freshman	Running backs: 12 Stephen Houston – (redshirt) Sophomore; 18 Xavier Whitaker – (redshirt) Freshman; 20 D'Angelo Roberts – Freshman; 24 Matt Perez – (redshirt) Freshman; 25 David Blackwell – (redshirt) Sophomore; 26 Nick Turner – (redshirt) Sophomore; 27 Antonio Banks – Sophomore; 28 Darius Willis – (redshirt) Junior; Fullbacks: 87 Leneil Himes – (redshirt) Freshman; Tight ends: 41 Max Dedmond – (redshirt) Senior; 83 Ted Bolser – (redshirt) Sophomore; 85 Charles Love III – (redshirt) Junior; 86 Paul Phillips – (redshirt) Freshman	Defensive line: 25 Ryan Phillis – (redshirt) Freshman; 34 Kevin Bush – (redshirt) Junior; 44 Darius Johnson – (redshirt) Senior; 52 Marlandez Harris – (redshirt) Freshman; 61 Mike Carter – (redshirt) Sophomore; 63 Jerrell Kirlew – (redshirt) Junior; 69 Mick Mentzer – (redshirt) Junior; 73 Bernard Taylor – Freshman; 75 Nicholas Sliger – (redshirt) Junior; 78 Tony Carter – (redshirt) Senior; 90 Jake Reed – Freshman; 92 Harrison Scott – (redshirt) Freshman; 93 Fred Jones – (redshirt) Senior; 94 Javon Comley – (redshirt) Sophomore; 95 Bobby Richardson – Freshman; 96 John Laihinen – (redshirt) Freshman; 97 Larry Black – (redshirt) Junior; 98 Adam Replogle – Junior; 99 Adarius Rayner – Freshman; Linebackers: 31 Lee Rose – (redshirt) Junior; 33 Zack Shaw – Freshman; 39 Brandon McGhee – (redshirt) Senior; 40 Matt Zakrzewski – (redshirt) Freshman; 41 Jake Michalek – (redshirt) Freshman; 42 Chad Sherer – (redshirt) Junior; 43 Ishmael Thomas – (redshirt) Freshman; 45 Dimitrius Carr-Watson – (redshirt) Sophomore; 46 Mike Replogle – Freshman; 47 Chase Hoobler – (redshirt) Freshman; 48 Leon Beckum – (redshirt) Senior; 49 Griffen Dahlstrom – (redshirt) Sophomore; 51 Kyle Kennedy – Freshman; 53 Jeff Thomas – (redshirt) Senior; 59 Greg Svarczkopf – (redshirt) Junior	Defensive backs: 2 Leynatta Kiles – Senior; 3 Drew Hardin – (redshirt) Freshman; 4 Forisse Hardin – Freshman; 6 Brian Williams – (redshirt) Freshman; 9 Greg Heban – (redshirt) Sophomore; 10 Donnell Jones – (redshirt) Senior; 14 Nick Stoner – Freshman; 17 Michael Hunter – Freshman; 21 Jake Zupancic – (redshirt) Freshman; 22 Kenny Mullen – Freshman; 23 Lawrence Barnett – (redshirt) Sophomore; 27 Alexander Webb – (redshirt) Junior; 29 Chris Adkins – (redshirt) Senior; 30 Jarrell Drane – (redshirt) Senior; 35 Shaquille Jefferson – (redshirt) Freshman; 36 Peter St. Fort – (redshirt) Junior; 37 Mark Murphy – Freshman; Punters: 10 Adam Pines – (redshirt) Junior; 30 Nathan Reisman – (redshirt) Sophomore; 42 Chad Roggeman – (redshirt) Sophomore; Place kickers: 16 Mitch Ewald – (redshirt) Sophomore; 99 Nick Freeland – (redshirt) Junior; Long snappers: 91 Matt Dooley – Freshman
