= Bennie Fowler =

American football player (born 1991)

Bennie Fowler III
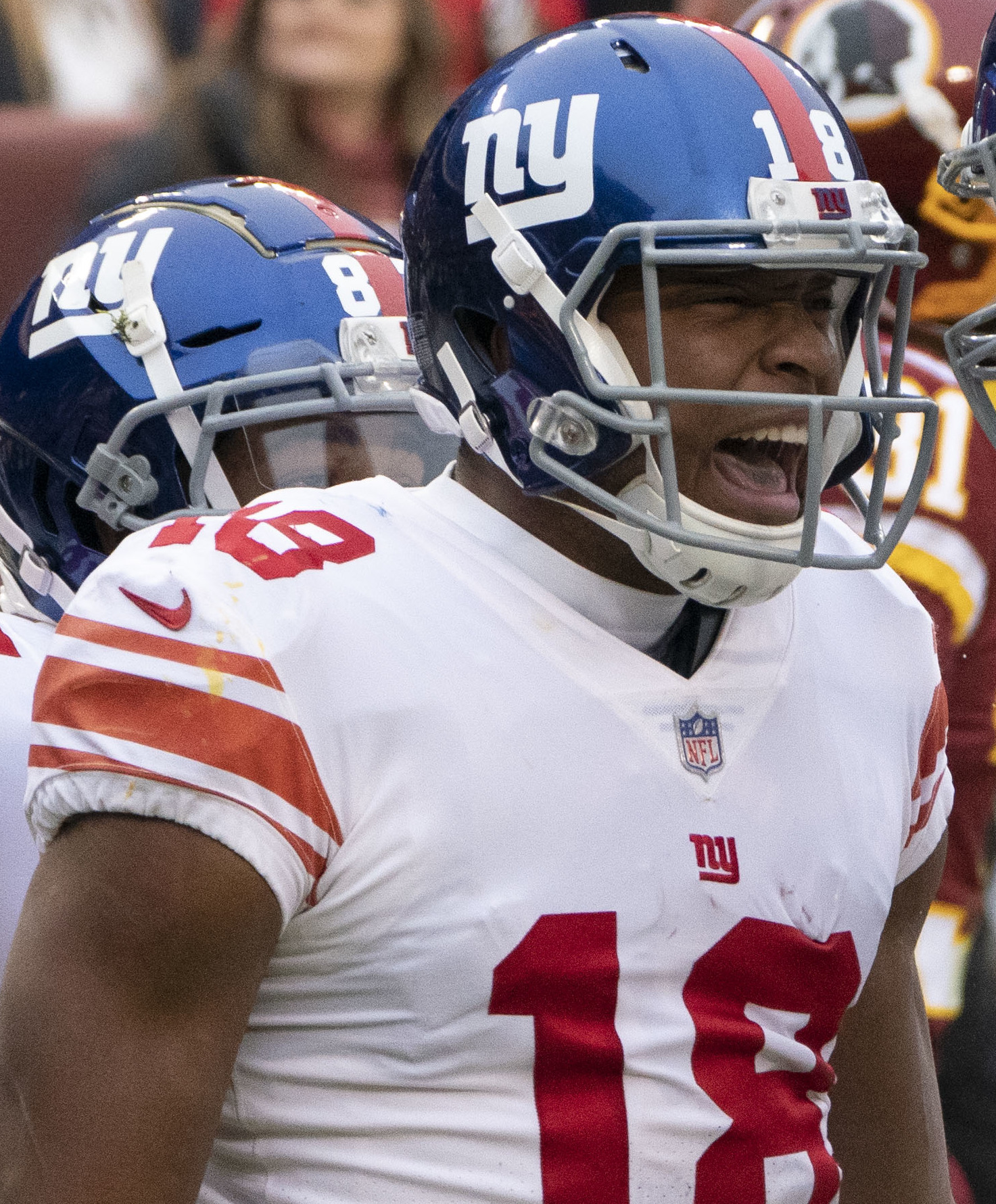
- Fowler with the New York Giants in 2018

No. 16, 18, 81
- Position: Wide receiver

Personal information
- Born: June 10, 1991 (age 35); Beverly Hills, Michigan, U.S.
- Listed height: 6 ft 1 in (1.85 m)
- Listed weight: 218 lb (99 kg)

Career information
- High school: Detroit Country Day School (Beverly Hills, Michigan)
- College: Michigan State (2009–2013)
- NFL draft: 2014: undrafted

Career history
- Denver Broncos (2014–2017); Chicago Bears (2018)*; New England Patriots (2018); New York Giants (2018–2019); New Orleans Saints (2020); San Francisco 49ers (2021)*
- * Offseason or practice squad member only

Awards and highlights
- Super Bowl champion (50)

Career NFL statistics
- Receptions: 97
- Receiving yards: 1,101
- Receiving touchdowns: 6
- Stats at Pro Football Reference

Bennie Fowler III (born June 10, 1991) is an American former professional football player who was a wide receiver in the National Football League (NFL). He played college football for the Michigan State Spartans and was signed by the Denver Broncos as an undrafted free agent in 2014.

== Early life ==
Fowler attended Detroit Country Day School, where he was named to SuperPrep and PrepStar's All-Midwest Teams. He was also listed among the Midwest's top prospects by SuperPrep at No. 72, he was also rated among the nations top wide receivers by Scouts, Inc. at No. 80. He was also ranked among the state's top seniors by the Lansing State Journal at No. 15 overall, Rivals.com at No. 15 also, The Detroit News at No. 16, and the Detroit Free Press at No. 16. He was also named to the Detroit Free Press All-State Division 4 Team. He was also named All-State honorable mention as an all-purpose player by the Associated Press. He was also selected to the All-County Dream Team by The Oakland Press and All-North Team by The Detroit News.

As a junior in 2007, Fowler missed five games during the season with a broken collarbone. For the season, he recorded 12 receptions for 265 yards and four touchdowns. As a senior in 2008, he accounted for a total of 1,478 all-purpose yards and 15 touchdowns. He recorded 32 receptions for 683 yards and six touchdowns. On defense, he recorded 16 tackles, three sacks, and three pass-break ups while returning five punts for 218 yards and five kickoffs for 122 yards.

In his high school career, Fowler recorded 44 receptions for 903 yards and 10 touchdowns, he also rushed the ball 58 times for 542 yards and nine touchdowns.

In addition to playing football, Fowler won the Oakland County 100-meter and state long jump titles in 2008. He was also a member of the Detroit Country Day School Yellow Jackets' 2007 state championship basketball team.

== College career ==
After graduating from high school, Fowler attended Michigan State.

As a freshman in 2009, Fowler redshirted with a stress fracture in his foot. As a redshirt freshman, in 2010, he appeared in all 13 games and finished sixth on the team with 573 all-purpose yards. He recorded 14 receptions for 175 yards, and carried the ball seven times for 62 yards. He also returned 15 kickoffs for 336 yards. His return yards ranked second on the team behind Keshawn Martin. Fowler also recorded a career best 161 all-purpose yards against No. 15 Alabama in the 2011 Capital One Bowl. As a redshirt sophomore in 2011, he appeared in just five games due to a foot injury. He recorded two receptions for 20 yards and one carry for six yards. As a redshirt junior in 2012, he led the team with 524 receiving yards and four touchdowns and ranked second with 41 receptions. He also tied for the lead the team with seven receptions of 20-plus yards. As a redshirt senior in 2013, he again led the team in receiving yards, with 622 yards, and touchdowns, with six. He also ranked third on the team with 36 receptions. He finished second on the team with 10 receptions for 20-plus yards. Fowler's six touchdowns ranked sixth in the Big Ten in 2013.

=== Career statistics ===
Season	Team	GP	Receiving					Rushing				
Season	Team	GP	Rec	Yds	Avg	Lng	TD	Att	Yds	Avg	Lng	TD
2009	Michigan State	0	DNP									
2010	Michigan State	13	14	175	12.5	39	1	7	62	8.9	—	1
2011	Michigan State	5	2	20	10.0	—	0	1	6	6.0	6	0
2012	Michigan State	13	41	524	12.7	—	4	3	14	4.7	—	0
2013	Michigan State	12	36	622	17.3	87	6	5	20	4.0	—	0
Career		43	93	1,341	14.4	87	11	16	102	6.4	—	1

== Professional career ==
Pre-draft measurables
Height	Weight	Arm length	Hand span	40-yard dash	10-yard split	20-yard split	20-yard shuttle	Three-cone drill	Vertical jump	Broad jump	Bench press
6 ft 1 1/4 in (1.86 m)	217 lb (98 kg)	32 in (0.81 m)	9 1/2 in (0.24 m)	4.52 s	1.65 s	2.70 s	7.06 s	4.18 s	36 in (0.91 m)	10 ft 6 in (3.20 m)	18 reps
All values from NFL Combine/Michigan State's Pro Day

=== Denver Broncos ===
==== 2014 season ====
On May 10, 2014, the Denver Broncos signed Fowler as an undrafted free agent to a one-year, $114,000 contract. On August 30, 2014, he was waived by the Broncos as part of their final roster cuts. On August 31, 2014, he was signed to the practice squad.

==== 2015 season ====
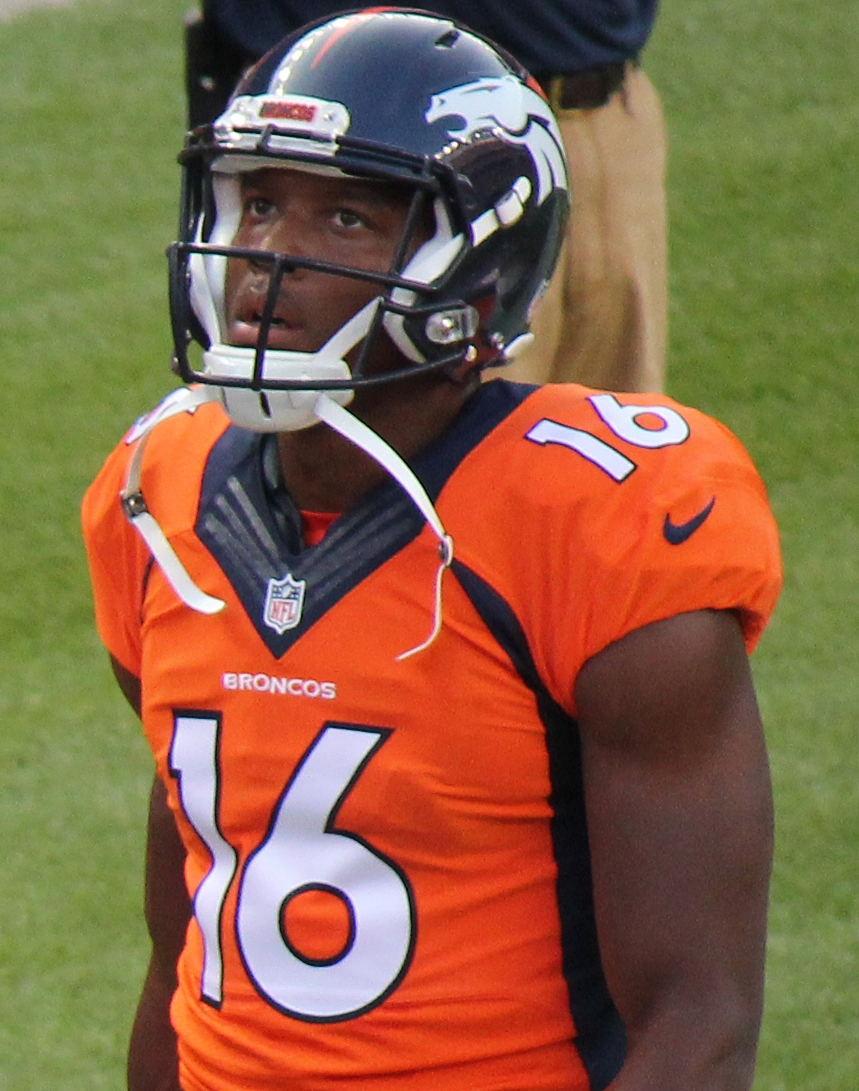
Fowler with the Broncos in 2015

On January 15, 2015, the Denver Broncos signed Fowler to a one-year, $550,000 reserve/future contract.

Fowler played in all 16 regular season games for the Broncos, ending the 2015 season with 16 receptions for 203 yards. On February 7, 2016, Fowler was part of the Broncos team that defeated the Carolina Panthers by a score of 24–10 in Super Bowl 50. Towards the end of the game, Fowler caught a pass for a two-point conversion from quarterback Peyton Manning to make it a 14-point game and cement the Broncos' third Super Bowl title. Notably, this would be the final pass of Manning's career.

On April 15, 2016, Fowler re-signed with the Broncos.

==== 2016 season ====
Fowler appeared in 13 games and recorded 11 receptions for 145 yards and two touchdowns in the 2016 season.

==== 2017 season ====
On September 11, 2017, in the season opener against the Los Angeles Chargers on Monday Night Football, Fowler recorded a career-high two receiving touchdowns. He finished the season with a career-high 29 receptions for 350 yards and three touchdowns.

=== Chicago Bears ===
On April 13, 2018, Fowler signed a one-year contract with the Chicago Bears. He was released on September 1, 2018, as part of final roster cuts.

=== New England Patriots ===
On September 11, 2018, Fowler was signed by the New England Patriots, but was released four days later.

=== New York Giants ===
On October 16, 2018, Fowler was signed by the New York Giants. He scored his first touchdown with the Giants in Week 14 against the Washington Redskins in a 40–16 victory. In the 2018 season, Fowler finished with 16 receptions for 199 receiving yards and one touchdown in ten games and five starts.

On March 19, 2019, Fowler re-signed with the Giants. He was released on October 1, 2019, as fellow wide receiver Golden Tate was activated following suspension. He was re-signed on October 14, 2019. He was released on November 26. In the 2019 season, Fowler finished with 23 receptions for 193 receiving yards in eight games and two starts.

=== New Orleans Saints ===
Fowler signed with the New Orleans Saints on August 3, 2020. He was released on September 5, 2020, and signed to the practice squad the next day. He was elevated to the active roster on September 12 in advance of the week 1 game against the Tampa Bay Buccaneers. He recovered a muffed kickoff lost by Mike Edwards in the game, and reverted to the practice squad the day after. He was elevated again on September 21 for the week 2 game against the Las Vegas Raiders, and reverted to the practice squad again following the game. He was promoted to the active roster on September 26, 2020. He was placed on injured reserve on October 23, 2020, after undergoing shoulder surgery. He appeared in five games in the 2020 season.

=== San Francisco 49ers ===
On May 21, 2021, Fowler signed with the San Francisco 49ers. He was released on July 31, 2021.

== NFL career statistics ==
Year	Team	Games		Receiving						Fumbles	
Year	Team	GP	GS	Trgt	Rec	Yds	Avg	Lng	TD	Fum	Lost
2015	DEN	16	1	25	16	203	12.7	41	0	0	0
2016	DEN	13	0	24	11	145	13.2	76	2	0	0
2017	DEN	16	4	56	29	350	12.1	29	3	1	0
2018	NYG	10	5	27	16	199	12.4	26	1	1	0
2019	NYG	8	2	36	23	193	8.4	17	0	0	0
2020	NO	5	0	6	2	11	5.5	7	0	0	0
Career		68	12	174	97	1,101	11.4	76	6	2	0

== Personal life ==
Bennie Fowler is the son of Bennie Fowler Jr. and Teresa Gueyser. He has a younger brother, Chris Fowler, who played basketball at Central Michigan University. He also has a younger sister who played volleyball at Florida Southern. He is also longtime friends with Golden State Warriors power forward Draymond Green, who also attended Michigan State.

On April 10, 2025, it was announced that Fowler would be joining the DNVR Broncos podcast following the departure of previous host Todd Davis to join the Broncos' coaching staff.
