= Keith Nichol =

American football player (born 1988)

No. 7,6
- Position: Wide receiver

Personal information
- Born: December 24, 1988 (age 37); Lowell, Michigan, U.S.
- Listed height: 6 ft 1 in (1.85 m)
- Listed weight: 213 lb (97 kg)

Career information
- High school: Lowell
- College: Oklahoma (2007); Michigan State (2008–2011)
- NFL draft: 2012: undrafted

Keith Nichol (born December 24, 1988) is an American former football player who was a wide receiver and quarterback. He played college football for the Oklahoma Sooners football and Michigan State Spartans.

== Early life ==
Nichol attended Lowell High School in Lowell, Michigan. After a good freshman season, Nichol was promoted to the varsity team for the playoffs and saw some playing time as a cornerback in a blowout. Nichol had a breakout season as a sophomore. He threw for 2,125 yards and 26 touchdowns in Lowell's veer offense and led the team to a state championship. His success led to him being heavily recruited by several teams in the Big Ten Conference as well as the University of Notre Dame. In July 2005, Nichol committed to play for the Michigan State University. Nichol also participated in the ESPN RISE Elite 11 quarterback camp. After his commitment, the Spartans went 9-14 and head coach John L. Smith was fired. As a result, Nichol backed out of his commitment with the Spartans and committed to the University of Oklahoma, a school that expressed strong interest in him after his de-commitment. In his senior year, Nichol passed for 2,225 yards and 31 touchdowns. As a three-year starter, Nichol won 33 games with three losses. He passed for 6,550 yards and 76 touchdowns and ran for 3,100 yards and 58 touchdowns in his high school career. He was an all-state selection three times. Nichol was ranked as the sixth best dual-threat quarterback in the country out of high school by Rivals.com. Scout.com ranked him the 22nd best high school quarterback overall.

== College career ==
=== Freshman season ===
With the Sooners, Nichol competed against redshirt freshman Sam Bradford and junior Joey Halzle for the starting quarterback position during spring practices in 2007. After a scrimmage game, Bradford was named the starter. During the year, Nichol was the third-string quarterback, playing in three games and completing two of seven passes for 15 yards. After the season, Nichol transferred to Michigan State University, the school he had originally committed to while back in high school. By NCAA rule, Nichol had to sit out the 2008 season.

=== Sophomore season ===
Before the 2009 season, Nichol competed against Spartans sophomore Kirk Cousins for the starting quarterback position. Cousins started the first game with Nichol receiving playing time in which he threw two touchdown passes in a victory over the Montana State Bobcats. On October 10, 2009, Nichol made his first career start against the Illinois Fighting Illini. He completed 13 of 25 passes for 179 yards and one interception in a victory. In preparation for the 2010 Alamo Bowl, Nichol changed over to the wide-receiver position, catching two passes for 11 yards and also scored his first career rushing touchdown against the Red Raiders, with a 7-yard run out of the wildcat formation in the third quarter.

=== Junior season ===
He was an Academic All-Big Ten selection and appeared in all 13 games in 2010, including eight starts. Ranked fifth on the team with 22 receptions for 262 yards (11.9 avg.), caught at least one pass in 11 games, and also completed 4-of-7 passes for 62 yards and two scores. With Kirk Cousins and Andrew Maxwell sidelined with injuries vs. No. 15 Alabama in the 2011 Capital One Bowl, he took snaps at quarterback in the fourth quarter and hit 2-of-5 throws for 56 yards, including a 49-yard TD strike to Bennie Fowler, Keith also had three catches for 22 yards against the Crimson Tide. His 3-yard TD toss to Charlie Gantt with 8:31 left in the fourth quarter at Penn State gave MSU a 28–10 lead and proved to be the game winner as the Spartans held on for a 28–22 victory to clinch a share of the 2010 Big Ten Championship, caught three passes for 19 yards vs. Purdue, and set career highs in receptions (4) and receiving yards (51) at Northwestern, including two catches for 34 yards on MSU's game-winning touchdown drive in the fourth quarter. His career-long 42-yard grab from Cousins at No. 18 Michigan set up Larry Caper's 8-yard TD run late in the third quarter, hauled in three passes for 30 yards vs. No. 11 Wisconsin, caught two passes for 32 yards in the season opener vs. Western Michigan, including his first career touchdown reception, a 20-yard grab from Cousins early in the second quarter.

=== Senior season ===
Nichol played an important role as receiver for the Spartans during the 2011 season. He caught a hail mary touchdown pass on the final play against No. 6 Wisconsin, securing the Spartans victory and went on to win the Big Ten Legends Division and will have a rematch against No. 15 Wisconsin in the 2011 Big Ten Championship Game. He help lead the Spartans to a comeback win against No. 16 Georgia in the Outback Bowl.

=== College statistics ===
Year	Team	Games				Passing								Rushing				Receiving			
Year	Team	POS	GP	GS	Record (Note: Accounts for only GS as a QB)	Cmp	Att	Pct	Yds	Y/A	TD	Int	Rtg	Att	Yds	Avg	TD	Rec	Yds	Avg	TD
2007	Oklahoma	QB	3	0	—	2	7	28.6	15	2.1	0	0	46.6	3	13	4.3	0				
2008	Michigan State	Ineligible due to NCAA transfer rule																			
2009	Michigan State	QB	10	1	1–0	49	91	53.8	764	8.4	7	3	143.2	22	128	5.8	1	2	11	5.5	0
2010	Michigan State	QB/WR	13	8	—	4	7	57.1	62	8.9	2	0	225.8	4	9	2.3	0	22	262	11.9	1
2011	Michigan State	WR	14	5	—													26	352	13.5	3
Career			40	14	1–0	55	105	52.4	841	8.0	9	3	142.2	29	150	5.2	1	50	625	12.5	4

== Professional career ==
On May 3, 2012, Nichol joined with the Washington Redskins as an undrafted free agent on a try-out basis. The next day, it was reported that he was attending the Redskins' rookie mini-camp, which reunited him with Michigan State teammate, Kirk Cousins. Nichol was not offered a contract at the end of the mini-camp. He later attended rookie mini-camp with the Chicago Bears and worked out for the Detroit Lions, but wasn't offered a contract by either team.
