= 2011 Big Ten Football Championship Game =

- Conference Championship
Wisconsin Badgers	Michigan State Spartans
(10–2)	(10–2)
42	39
Head coach: Bret Bielema	Head coach: Mark Dantonio
AP / Coaches / BCS; 15 / 12 / 15	AP / Coaches / BCS; 11 / 9 / 13
	1	2	3	4	Total
Wisconsin	21	0	7	14	42
Michigan State	7	22	7	3	39
- Date: December 3, 2011
- Season: 2011
- Stadium: Lucas Oil Stadium
- Location: Indianapolis, Indiana
- MVP: Russell Wilson
- Favorite: Wisconsin by 1.5
- National anthem: Michigan State University Spartan Marching Band and University of Wisconsin Marching Band
- Referee: Bill LeMonnier
- Attendance: 64,152

United States TV coverage
- Network: Fox
- Announcers: Gus Johnson (Play-by-play) Charles Davis (Color Analyst); Tim Brewster (Sideline Analyst) Dhani Jones (Sideline Analyst)
- Nielsen ratings: 4.6 (7.8 million viewers)

2011 Big Ten Conference football standings
	Conf.			Overall
Team	W		L	W		L
Legends Division
No. 11 Michigan State x	7	–	1	11	–	3
No. 12 Michigan %	6	–	2	11	–	2
No. 24 Nebraska	5	–	3	9	–	4
Iowa	4	–	4	7	–	6
Northwestern	3	–	5	6	–	7
Minnesota	2	–	6	3	–	9
Leaders Division
No. 10 Wisconsin xy$	6	–	2	11	–	3
Penn State x	6	–	2	9	–	4
Purdue	4	–	4	7	–	6
Ohio State	3	–	5	6	–	7
Illinois	2	–	6	7	–	6
Indiana	0	–	8	1	–	11
Championship: Wisconsin 42, Michigan State 39
$ – BCS representative as conference champion; % – BCS at-large representative; x – Division champion/co-champions; y – Championship game participant; Rankings from AP Poll

The 2011 Big Ten Football Championship Game was a college football game. It was played on December 3, 2011, at Lucas Oil Stadium in Indianapolis, Indiana, to determine the 2011 champion of the Big Ten Conference. The Wisconsin Badgers of the Leaders Division beat the Michigan State Spartans of the Legends Division by a score of 42–39. By winning the game, Wisconsin earned a berth in the 2012 Rose Bowl.

The game was the first football championship game ever played in the Big Ten's 115-year history. The game was played in prime time and televised by Fox.

== Scoring summary ==
Scoring summary

Quarter	Time	Drive			Team	Scoring information	Score	
Quarter	Time	Plays	Yards	TOP	Team	Scoring information	WIS	MSU
1	10:04	9	71	4:56	WIS	Jeff Duckworth 3-yard touchdown reception from Russell Wilson, Philip Welch kick good	7	0
1	6:44	6	59	3:20	MSU	Edwin Baker 8-yard touchdown run, Dan Conroy kick good	7	7
1	3:44	7	60	3:00	WIS	Montee Ball 6-yard touchdown run, Philip Welch kick good	14	7
1	3:12	2	24	0:32	WIS	Montee Ball 6-yard touchdown run, Philip Welch kick good	21	7
2	14:55	7	80	3:17	MSU	B.J. Cunningham 30-yard touchdown reception from Kirk Cousins, Dan Conroy kick good	21	14
2	10:21	6	57	2:42	MSU	Keith Nichol 3-yard reception from Kirk Cousins, lateral to B.J. Cunningham for 7 yards for a touchdown, 2pt run good	21	22
2	3:26	8	84	3:57	MSU	Le'Veon Bell 6-yard touchdown run, Dan Conroy kick good	21	29
3	9:13	8	62	3:30	WIS	Jared Abbrederis 42-yard touchdown reception from Russell Wilson, Philip Welch kick good	28	29
3	1:41	3	48	1:01	MSU	B.J. Cunningham 44-yard touchdown reception from Kirk Cousins, Dan Conroy kick good	28	36
4	13:25	7	52	3:16	WIS	Montee Ball 5-yard touchdown reception from Russell Wilson, Philip Welch kick no good	34	36
4	8:28	10	52	4:57	MSU	25-yard field goal by Dan Conroy	34	39
4	3:45	8	64	4:43	WIS	Montee Ball 7-yard touchdown run, 2-point pass good	42	39
"TOP" = time of possession. For other American football terms, see Glossary of American football.							42	39
