= Brandon Boykin =

American football player (born 1990)

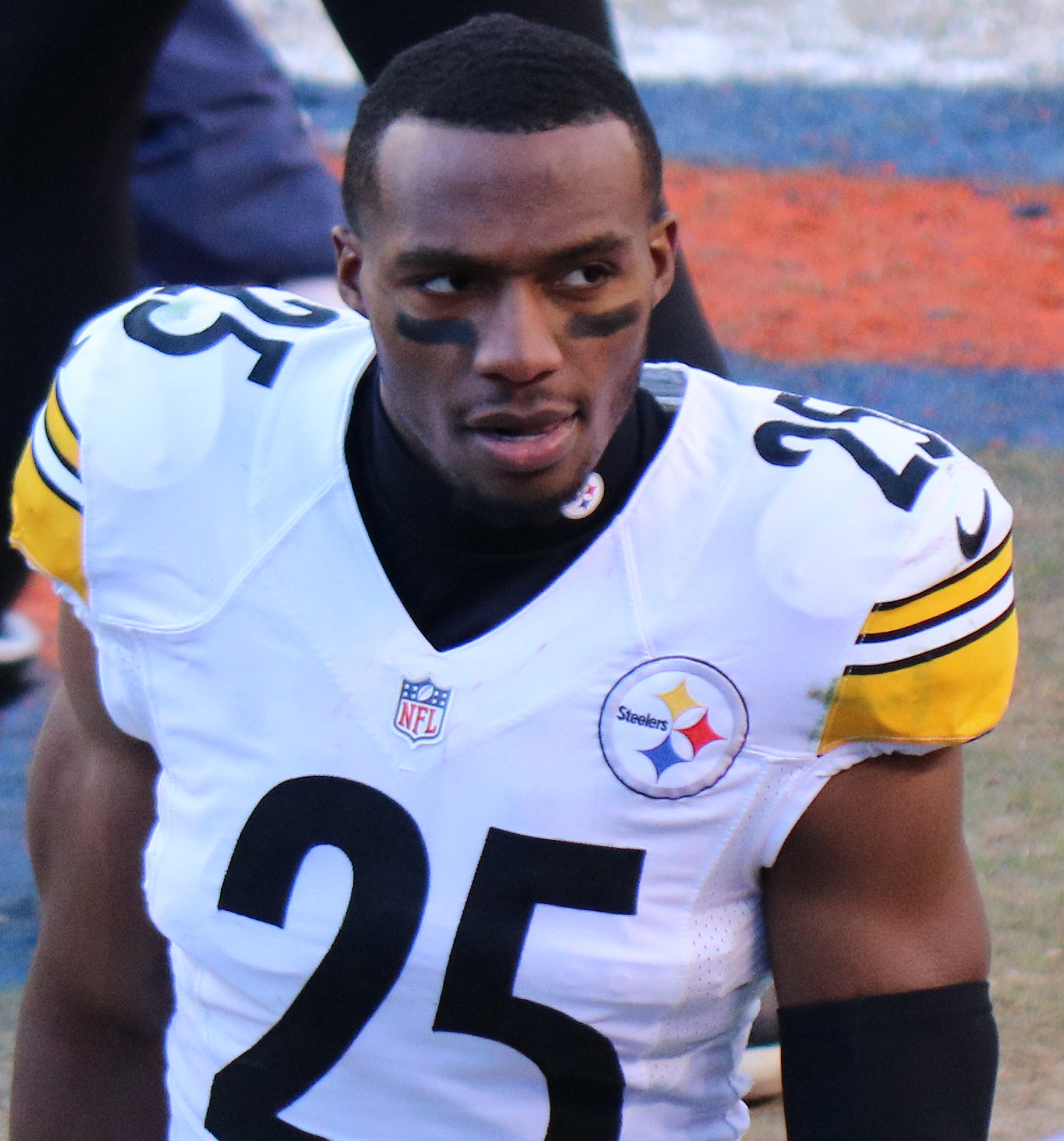
- Boykin with the Pittsburgh Steelers in 2015

No. 22, 25
- Position: Cornerback

Personal information
- Born: July 13, 1990 (age 36); Atlanta, Georgia, U.S.
- Listed height: 5 ft 10 in (1.78 m)
- Listed weight: 186 lb (84 kg)

Career information
- High school: Fayette County (Fayetteville, Georgia)
- College: Georgia
- NFL draft: 2012: 4th round, 123rd overall pick

Career history
- Philadelphia Eagles (2012–2014); Pittsburgh Steelers (2015); Carolina Panthers (2016)*; Chicago Bears (2016)*; Baltimore Ravens (2017)
- * Offseason or practice squad member only

Awards and highlights
- Paul Hornung Award (2011); Second-team All-SEC (2011); Outback Bowl MVP (2012); SEC All-time leader; kick return touchdowns (tied, 4)

Career NFL statistics
- Total tackles: 145
- Sacks: 2.0
- Forced fumbles: 5
- Pass deflections: 38
- Interceptions: 8
- Defensive touchdowns: 1
- Stats at Pro Football Reference

Brandon Boykin (born July 13, 1990) is an American former professional football player who was a cornerback in the National Football League (NFL). He played college football for the Georgia Bulldogs and was selected by the Philadelphia Eagles in the fourth round of the 2012 NFL draft. He was also a member of the Pittsburgh Steelers, Carolina Panthers, Chicago Bears and Baltimore Ravens.

== Early life ==
Boykin attended Fayette County High School (Georgia) and played for the varsity football team. In his senior year, he, along with fellow NFL Player Matt Daniels, led the football team into its first undefeated season in over 20 years but lost in the second round of the GHSA playoff. Boykin also played for the school's basketball team where he averaged 18 points and five assists per game while helping lead his team to the State Championship game where he and his team came up short.

== College career ==
Boykin attended the University of Georgia from 2008 to 2011. He finished his career with 159 tackles, nine interceptions and a sack. As a senior, he was named the MVP of the 2012 Outback Bowl after tackling Keshawn Martin for a safety, and returning a punt 92 yards for a touchdown in a 33–30 triple overtime loss to the Michigan State Spartans. Boykin also won the Paul Hornung Award.

== Professional career ==
=== Philadelphia Eagles ===
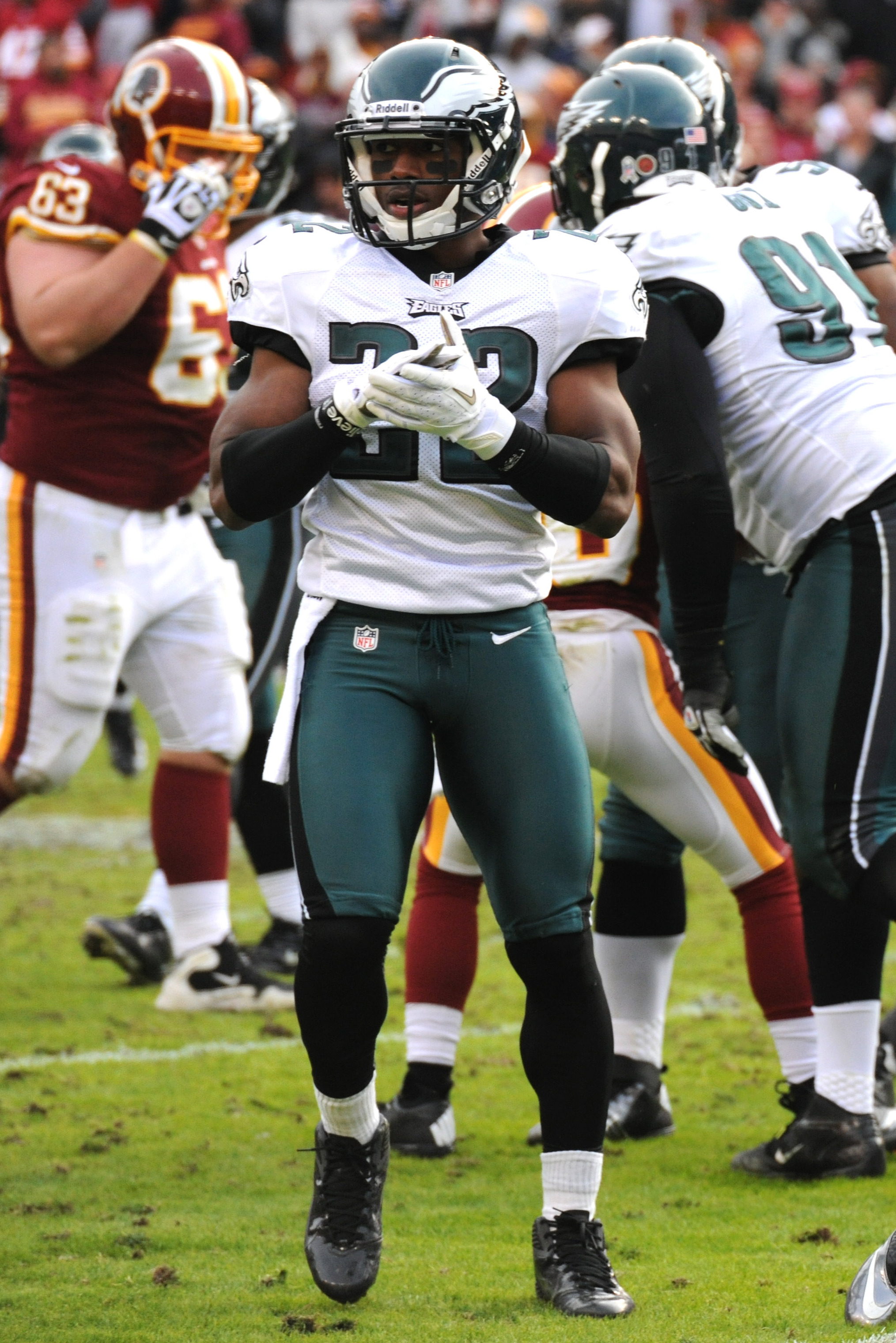
Boykin in 2012 with the Eagles.

Boykin was selected in the fourth round (123rd overall) of the 2012 NFL draft by the Philadelphia Eagles. He signed a four-year contract with the team on May 11, 2012. His first season he recorded 31 total tackles, 7 passes defended, and 1 forced fumble. He saw little playing action on defense, but his 1,037 kick return yards were second in the NFC and seventh in the NFL.

Boykin started the 2013 season with his first interception, off Redskins quarterback Robert Griffin III, helping the Eagles to win 33–27. He recorded his next interception in a week 5 win over the Giants where he picked off Eli Manning. In a week 10 game against the Green Bay Packers who were without quarterback Aaron Rodgers, Boykin intercepted quarterback Scott Tolzien's pass in the endzone and ran it back for 76 yards. He followed up again the next week, intercepting Redskins quarterback Robert Griffin III. In a week 16 game against the Chicago Bears, Boykin intercepted Jay Cutler and ran it back 54 yards for the score. The week 17 showdown against division rival Dallas Cowboys was for the NFC East division title. Late in the fourth quarter the Cowboys marched down the field when back-up quarterback Kyle Orton threw behind his wide receiver, Miles Austin. Boykin intercepted the pass and kneed it after a short return. The interception led to the Eagles rushing the ball twice for a first down, then two kneel downs to run out the clock and seal the Eagles' divisional win at a final score of 24–22. Boykin enjoyed a breakout year in 2013 with 42 solo tackles, 5 assists, 2 forced fumbles, 16 passes defended, and 6 interceptions (second in the NFL). For the 2014 season, Boykin had 36 solo tackles, 5 assists, 9 passes defended, and an interception.

=== Pittsburgh Steelers ===
On August 1, 2015, Boykin was traded to the Pittsburgh Steelers in exchange for a conditional 2016 5th-round pick.

=== Carolina Panthers ===
On March 28, 2016, Boykin signed a one-year contract with the Carolina Panthers. The Panthers released Boykin and two others to create roster space for six new rookie tryouts two months later.

=== Chicago Bears ===
On July 27, 2016, Boykin signed with the Chicago Bears. He was placed on the team's injured reserve list on August 3, due to a pectoral injury suffered during training camp.

=== Baltimore Ravens ===
On June 5, 2017, Boykin signed with the Baltimore Ravens. He was placed on injured reserve on September 2.

== NFL career statistics ==
Legend
**Bold**	Career high

=== Regular season ===
Year	Team	Games		Tackles					Interceptions					Fumbles			
Year	Team	GP	GS	Cmb	Solo	Ast	Sck	TFL	Int	Yds	TD	Lng	PD	FF	FR	Yds	TD
2012	PHI	16	4	31	29	2	**1.0**	0	0	0	0	0	7	1	0	0	0
2013	PHI	16	2	**47**	**42**	**5**	0.0	0	**6**	**136**	**1**	**76**	**17**	**2**	0	0	0
2014	PHI	16	0	42	37	**5**	0.0	0	1	0	0	0	9	1	0	0	0
2015	PIT	16	1	25	20	**5**	**1.0**	**3**	1	1	0	1	5	1	**1**	0	0
		64	7	145	128	17	2.0	3	8	137	1	76	38	5	1	0	0

=== Postseason ===
Year	Team	Games		Tackles					Interceptions					Fumbles			
Year	Team	GP	GS	Cmb	Solo	Ast	Sck	TFL	Int	Yds	TD	Lng	PD	FF	FR	Yds	TD
2013	PHI	1	1	0	0	0	0.0	0	0	0	0	0	0	0	0	0	0
2015	PIT	2	1	**6**	**6**	0	0.0	0	0	0	0	0	**1**	0	0	0	0
		3	2	6	6	0	0.0	0	0	0	0	0	1	0	0	0	0
