= 2011 Georgia Bulldogs football team =

American college football season

2011 Georgia Bulldogs football

SEC Eastern Division champion

SEC Championship Game, L 10–42 vs. LSU

Outback Bowl, L 30–33 ^{3OT} vs. Michigan State
- Conference: Southeastern Conference
- Eastern Division

Ranking
- Coaches: No. 20
- AP: No. 19
- Record: 10–4 (7–1 SEC)
- Head coach: Mark Richt (11th season)
- Offensive coordinator: Mike Bobo (5th season)
- Offensive scheme: Pro-style
- Defensive coordinator: Todd Grantham (2nd season)
- Base defense: 3–4
- Captains: Brandon Boykin; Drew Butler; Ben Jones
- Home stadium: Sanford Stadium

2011 Southeastern Conference football standings
	Conf.			Overall
Team	W		L	W		L
Eastern Division
No. 19 Georgia x	7	–	1	10	–	4
No. 9 South Carolina	6	–	2	11	–	2
Florida	3	–	5	7	–	6
Vanderbilt	2	–	6	6	–	7
Kentucky	2	–	6	5	–	7
Tennessee	1	–	7	5	–	7
Western Division
No. 2 LSU x$	8	–	0	13	–	1
No. 1 Alabama %#	7	–	1	12	–	1
No. 5 Arkansas	6	–	2	11	–	2
Auburn	4	–	4	8	–	5
Mississippi State	2	–	6	7	–	6
Ole Miss*	0	–	8	2	–	10
Championship: LSU 42, Georgia 10
# – BCS National Champion; $ – BCS representative as conference champion; % – BCS at-large representative; x – Division champion/co-champions; * Ole Miss vacated all wins due to NCAA violations.; Rankings from AP Poll

The 2011 Georgia Bulldogs football team represented the University of Georgia in the 2011 NCAA Division I FBS football season. The Bulldogs were led by 11th-year head coach Mark Richt and played their home games at Sanford Stadium. They are a member of the Eastern Division of the Southeastern Conference. They finished the season 10–4, 7–1 in SEC play to be champions of the Eastern Division. They represented the division in the SEC Championship Game where they lost to Western Division representative LSU 42–10. They were invited to the Outback Bowl where they lost to Michigan State 33–30 in three overtimes. The 2011 season marked the first time since 1981 that UGA swept three of its biggest SEC rivals: Florida, Auburn and Tennessee; this feat would be repeated in the 2012 season.

== Personnel ==
=== Coaching staff ===
Name	Position	Seasons at Georgia	Alma mater
Mark Richt	Head coach	11	Miami (FL) (1982)
Rodney Garner	Associate head coach, Defensive Line, Recruiting Coordinator	14	Auburn (1990)
Mike Bobo	Offensive coordinator, Quarterbacks	11	Georgia (1997)
Todd Grantham	Defensive coordinator, Linebackers	2	Virginia Tech (1989)
Tony Ball	Wide Receivers	6	UT-Chattanooga (1983)
John Lilly	Tight Ends	4	Guilford (1990)
Bryan McClendon	Running Backs	5	Georgia (2005)
Will Friend	Offensive Line	1	Alabama (1998)
Kirk Olivadotti	Inside Linebackers	1	Purdue (1996)
Scott Lakatos	Defensive backs	2	Western Connecticut (1988)
Mike Macdonald	Defensive Quality Control Coach	2	Georgia (2010)

== Schedule ==
Date	Time	Opponent	Rank	Site	TV	Result	Attendance
September 3	8:00 p.m.	vs. No. 5 Boise State*	No. 19	Georgia Dome; Atlanta, GA (Chick-fil-A Kickoff Game)	ESPN	L 21–35	73,614
September 10	4:30 p.m.	No. 12 South Carolina		Sanford Stadium; Athens, GA (rivalry)	ESPN	L 42–45	92,746
September 17	1:00 p.m.	Coastal Carolina*		Sanford Stadium; Athens, GA	PPV	W 59–0	91,946
September 24	12:21 p.m.	at Ole Miss		Vaught–Hemingway Stadium; Oxford, MS	SECN	W 27–13	58,042
October 1	12:00 p.m.	Mississippi State		Sanford Stadium; Athens, GA	SECRN	W 24–10	92,746
October 8	7:00 p.m.	at Tennessee		Neyland Stadium; Knoxville, TN (rivalry)	ESPN2	W 20–12	102,455
October 15	7:00 p.m.	at Vanderbilt		Vanderbilt Stadium; Nashville, TN (rivalry)	SECRN	W 33–28	36,640
October 29	3:30 p.m.	vs. Florida	No. 22	EverBank Field; Jacksonville, FL (rivalry)	CBS	W 24–20	84,524
November 5	12:30 p.m.	New Mexico State*^{†}	No. 18	Sanford Stadium; Athens, GA	CSS	W 63–16	92,746
November 12	3:30 p.m.	No. 20 Auburn	No. 15	Sanford Stadium; Athens, GA (Deep South's Oldest Rivalry)	CBS	W 45–7	92,746
November 19	12:21 p.m.	Kentucky	No. 13	Sanford Stadium; Athens, GA	SECN	W 19–10	92,746
November 26	12:00 p.m.	at No. 25 Georgia Tech*	No. 13	Bobby Dodd Stadium; Atlanta, GA (Clean, Old-Fashioned Hate)	ESPN	W 31–17	54,925
December 3	4:00 p.m.	vs. No. 1 LSU	No. 12	Georgia Dome; Atlanta, GA (SEC Championship Game) (College GameDay)	CBS	L 10–42	74,515
January 2, 2012	1:00 p.m.	vs. No. 12 Michigan State*	No. 18	Raymond James Stadium; Tampa, FL (Outback Bowl)	ABC	L 30–33 ^{3OT}	49,429
*Non-conference game; ^{†}Homecoming; Rankings from AP Poll released prior to the game; All times are in Eastern time

== Game summaries ==
=== Boise State ===
	1	2	3	4	Total
#5 Broncos	7	7	14	7	35
#19 Bulldogs	7	0	7	7	21

Georgia opened up the 2011 season against the Boise State Broncos in the Chick-fil-A Kickoff Game held in the Georgia Dome. The matchup was only the second in both schools' history, the previous meeting being in 2005 where Georgia won 48–13 in Athens. The game initially got off to a slow start, until Georgia scored first late in the first quarter. However, in the second half, Boise State was able to pull away with 3 touchdowns to make the final score 35–21. Notably, both teams wore Nike Pro Combat jerseys as part of an agreement.

=== South Carolina ===
	1	2	3	4	Total
#12 Gamecocks	0	14	14	17	45
Bulldogs	6	7	7	22	42

Georgia's first conference game was against the South Carolina Gamecocks, the defending champion of the SEC's Eastern Division. Despite major improvements following the Boise State game, as well as three Carolina turnovers, the Bulldogs failed to win their first SEC game of the season.

=== Coastal Carolina ===
	1	2	3	4	Total
Chanticleers	0	0	0	0	0
Bulldogs	21	14	24	0	59

Following two losses, Georgia looked to get its first victory over the FCS Chanticleers. For the first time since 2000, the game was not sold out. However, Georgia outplayed the Chanticleers to get their first win as well as their first shutout since a 2010 win over the Vanderbilt Commodores.

=== Ole Miss ===
	1	2	3	4	Total
Bulldogs	10	14	0	3	27
Rebels	0	13	0	0	13

Georgia game against the Ole Miss Rebels was considered the first true road game of the season. While Bulldogs were able to rack up 24 points in the first half, they would only score 3 points in the second half. However, the Georgia defense was able to hold Ole Miss to 13 points, granting the Bulldogs their first conference win.

=== Mississippi State ===
	1	2	3	4	Total
Mississippi State Bulldogs	3	0	0	7	10
Georgia Bulldogs	14	7	3	0	24

In a home game against the Mississippi State Bulldogs, the Georgia offense manages to rack up 21 points during the first half while holding Mississippi State to a field goal. However, Georgia again had issues scoring in the second half, only scoring a field goal. However, Mississippi State would only score one more touchdown in the fourth quarter, allowing Georgia to improve to 3–2.

=== Tennessee ===
	1	2	3	4	Total
Bulldogs	3	3	14	0	20
Volunteers	0	6	0	6	12

Coming into this game, Georgia had not won an away game at Tennessee since 2005. In addition, the last two visits to Tennessee had been lopsided victories in favor of Tennessee. Early offensive problems led to a tie game at halftime. However, Georgia would score 14 points in the second half, for a 20–12 win. The win was historic in that it was the 100th career win at Georgia for head coach Mark Richt.

=== Vanderbilt ===
	1	2	3	4	Total
Bulldogs	0	20	6	7	33
Commodores	0	7	14	7	28

Georgia's game against Vanderbilt was a difficult win, though the Bulldogs would eventually win 33–28.

=== Florida ===
Team	1	2	3	4	Total
• Georgia	0	10	7	7	24
Florida	7	10	3	0	20

- Date: October 29
- Location: EverBank Field, Jacksonville, FL
- Game start: 3:30 p.m. EST
- TV announcers (CBS): Verne Lundquist, Gary Danielson & Tracy Wolfson

Scoring summary
1	7:34	FLA	Jordan Reed 11-yard pass from John Brantley (Brad Phillips kick)	FLA 7-0
2	13:28	UGA	Blair Walsh 32-yard field goal	FLA 7-3
2	13:16	FLA	Jeff Demps 99-yard kickoff return (Brad Phillips kick)	FLA 14-3
2	10:06	FLA	Brad Phillips 43-yard field goal	FLA 17-3
2	1:28	UGA	Michael Bennett 20-yard pass from Aaron Murray (Blair Walsh kick)	FLA 17-10
3	6:00	UGA	Tavarres King 14-yard pass from Aaron Murray (Blair Walsh kick)	Tied 17-17
3	4:54	FLA	Brad Phillips 40-yard field goal	FLA 20-17
4	13:18	UGA	Richard Samuel 4-yard run (Blair Walsh kick)	UGA 24-20

Georgia and Florida both came off a bye week coming to the game, with the game considered a must-win for Georgia coach Mark Richt. Meanwhile, Florida coach Will Muschamp had guaranteed a win over Georgia. Florida quarterback John Brantley made his return following an ankle sprain four weeks prior. During the game, Georgia's special teams problems became apparent as Florida was able to make huge returns, while Georgia kicker Blair Walsh missed two field goals. Near the end of the first half, the Gators were up 17–3, when Georgia chose to convert a 4th down and long for a touchdown rather than attempt a field goal. In the second half, the Gators were held to 3 points, but maintained a lead well into the 4th quarter, when Georgia running back Richard Samuel scored on a 4 yd run. Georgia would manage to hold off Florida despite poor field position to win 24–20.

=== New Mexico State ===
	1	2	3	4	Total
Aggies	0	3	0	13	16
#18 Bulldogs	7	42	7	7	63

The 2011 Homecoming game saw one of the all-time great performances over a single quarter by a Georgia Bulldogs teams. QB Aaron Murray threw for 238 yards and 5 touchdowns as Georgia scored 42 points in the second quarter to open up a 49–3 lead at the half. Murray never came back into the game and the second and third strings added 14 more points on their way to a 63–16 rout of the Aggies. The games marks the most yards gained and the most points scored in the Mark Richt era.

=== Auburn ===
Team	1	2	3	4	Total
Auburn	7	0	0	0	7
• Georgia	14	21	3	7	45

- Date: November 11
- Location: Sanford Stadium, Athens, GA
- Game start: 3:30 p.m. EST

Scoring summary
1	8:57	UGA	Tavarres King 8-yard pass from Aaron Murray (Blair Walsh kick)	UGA 7-0
1	6:13	AUB	Philip Lutzenkirchen 4-yard pass from C. J. Uzomah (Cody Parkey kick)	Tied 7-7
1	3:02	UGA	Michael Bennett 27-yard pass from Aaron Murray (Blair Walsh kick)	UGA 14-7
2	10:36	UGA	Bruce Figgins 15-yard pass from Aaron Murray (Blair Walsh kick)	UGA 21-7
2	9:41	UGA	Bacarri Rambo 24-yard interception return (Blair Walsh kick)	UGA 28-7
2	5:00	UGA	Malcolm Mitchell 25-yard pass from Aaron Murray (Blair Walsh kick)	UGA 35-7
3	7:32	UGA	Brandon Bogotay 26-yard field goal	UGA 38-7
4	5:59	UGA	Isaiah Crowell 9-yard run (Blair Walsh kick)	UGA 45-7

This matchup was played on November 12, 2011, 3:30 p.m. Considered the "Deep South's Oldest Rivalry" Pregame The Georgia Bulldogs are favored to win by 17 but Auburn Tigers fans are hungry to disrupt Georgia's seven-game winning streak. Both teams strike quickly with Georgia scoring first a few minutes into the first quarter. Auburn immediately answered on the ensuing drive with a touchdown making it 7–7. Auburn sputtered and never scored again or had the lead. Georgia went on a romp with QB Aaron Murray throwing four touchdown passes in the first half going 14–18 (no interceptions) surpassing former Georgia QB (current NFL QB of the Detroit Lions) Matthew Stafford's single season touchdown record of 25. Georgia Safety Bacarri Rambo's pick six on Auburn QB Clint Moseley seals the momentum for the Bulldogs and after an impressive start Georgia Bulldogs are up 35–7 over Auburn Tigers at the half. Georgia's defense stepped up again to hold Auburn to 51 yards rushing and 144 yards passing in the game with 3 forced turnovers. In the second half Georgia pounded the ball on the ground and only tried two pass plays, scoring a field goal and touchdown dominating the 2010 defending national champion Auburn Tigers 45–7, the largest routing of Auburn by a Georgia Bulldogs team since 1946.

Time Of Possession was lopsided. Georgia TOP 40:55 Georgia total offense: 528 Georgia Rushing: 304 Georgia Passing: 224 Georgia 3rd Down: 12 of 15 Georgia Turnovers: 2 Auburn TOP 19:05 Auburn total offense: 195 Auburn Rushing: 51 Auburn Passing: 144 Auburn 3rd Down: 3 of 11 Auburn Turnovers: 3

=== Kentucky ===
	1	2	3	4	Total
Wildcats	3	7	0	0	10
#13 Bulldogs	6	6	0	7	19

=== Georgia Tech ===
	1	2	3	4	Total
#13 Bulldogs	7	10	14	0	31
#25 Yellow Jackets	0	10	0	7	17

=== LSU–SEC Championship Game ===
	1	2	3	4	Total
#12 Bulldogs	10	0	0	0	10
#1 Tigers	0	7	21	14	42

=== Michigan State–Outback Bowl ===
	1	2	3	4	OT	2OT	3OT	Total
#12 Spartans	0	0	14	13	0	3	3	33
#18 Bulldogs	2	14	0	11	0	3	0	30

== Rankings ==
Ranking movements Legend: ██ Increase in ranking ██ Decrease in ranking — = Not ranked RV = Received votes
	Week															
Poll	Pre	1	2	3	4	5	6	7	8	9	10	11	12	13	14	Final
AP	19	RV	RV	RV	RV	RV	RV	24	22	18	14	13	13	12	18	19
Coaches	22	RV	RV	—	—	—	RV	RV	21	20	16	15	14	14	18	20
Harris	Not released						RV	RV	22	20	15	14	12	12	18	Not released
BCS	Not released							—	22	18	15	14	13	14	16	Not released
