= Mike Ekeler =

American football player and coach (born 1971)

Current position
- Title: Special teams coordinator
- Team: USC Trojans
- Conference: Big Ten

Biographical details
- Born: October 4, 1971 (age 55); David City, Nebraska, U.S.
- Education: Kansas State

Playing career
- 1991–1994: Kansas State
- Position: Linebacker

Coaching career (HC unless noted)
- 1999–2001: Skutt HS (NE) (volunteer)
- 2002: Manhattan HS (KS) (assistant)
- 2003–2004: Oklahoma (GA)
- 2005–2007: LSU (GA)
- 2008–2010: Nebraska (LB)
- 2011–2012: Indiana (co-DC/LB)
- 2013: USC (LB)
- 2014–2015: Georgia (ILB/DSTC)
- 2016: North Texas (DC/LB)
- 2017–2018: North Carolina (LB)
- 2019: Kansas (STC/ILB)
- 2020: North Texas (STC)
- 2021–2024: Tennessee (OLB/STC)
- 2025: Nebraska (STC)
- 2026–present: USC (STC)

Mike Ekeler (born October 4, 1971) is an American college football coach who is currently the special teams coordinator for the USC Trojans.

== College career ==
Ekeler played at Kansas State where he was a linebacker and special teams standout.

== Coaching career ==
On January 31, 2020, Ekeler was hired as the special teams coordinator at North Texas.
