= 2011 NCAA Division I FBS football rankings =

- Season: 2011
- Bowl season: 2011–12 bowl games
- Preseason No. 1: Oklahoma
- End of season champions: Alabama
- Conference with most teams in final AP poll: SEC (5)

Three human polls and one formula ranking make up the 2011 NCAA Division I FBS (Football Bowl Subdivision) football rankings, in addition to various publications' preseason polls. Unlike most sports, college football's governing body, the NCAA, does not bestow a national championship title. That title is bestowed by one or more of four different polling agencies. There are two main weekly polls that begin in the preseason: the AP Poll and the Coaches Poll. Two additional polls are released midway through the season; the Harris Interactive Poll is released after the sixth week of the season and the Bowl Championship Series (BCS) standings is released after the seventh week. The Harris Poll and Coaches Poll are factors in the BCS standings. At the end of the season, on Sunday, December 4, 2011, the BCS standings determines who plays in the BCS bowl games as well as the 2012 BCS National Championship Game on January 9, 2012 at the Louisiana Superdome in New Orleans, Louisiana.

== Legend ==
	Increase in ranking
	Decrease in ranking
	Not ranked previous week
	Selected for BCS National Championship Game
(#–#)	Win–loss record
(Italics)	Number of first place votes
т	Tied with team above or below also with this symbol

== AP Poll ==
	Preseason Aug 20	Week 1 Sep 6	Week 2 Sep 11	Week 3 Sep 18	Week 4 Sep 25	Week 5 Oct 2	Week 6 Oct 9	Week 7 Oct 16	Week 8 Oct 23	Week 9 Oct 30	Week 10 Nov 6	Week 11 Nov 13	Week 12 Nov 20	Week 13 Nov 27	Week 14 Dec 4	Week 15 (Final) Jan 10	
1.	Oklahoma (36)	Oklahoma (1–0) (32)	Oklahoma (1–0) (31)	Oklahoma (2–0) (37)	LSU (4–0) (42)	LSU (5–0) (40)	LSU (6–0) (40)	LSU (7–0) (41)	LSU (8–0) (49)	LSU (8–0) (47)	LSU (9–0) (59)	LSU (10–0) (60)	LSU (11–0) (60)	LSU (12–0) (60)	LSU (13–0) (60)	Alabama (12–1) (55)	1.
2.	Alabama (17)	LSU (1–0) (17)	Alabama (2–0) (10)	LSU (3–0) (14)	Oklahoma (3–0) (12)	Alabama (5–0) (12)	Alabama (6–0) (10)	Alabama (7–0) (11)	Alabama (7–0) (10)	Alabama (8–0) (10)	Oklahoma State (9–0)	Oklahoma State (10–0)	Alabama (10–1)	Alabama (11–1)	Alabama (11–1)	LSU (13–1) (1)	2.
3.	Oregon (4)	Alabama (1–0) (9)	LSU (2–0) (17)	Alabama (3–0) (7)	Alabama (4–0) (5)	Oklahoma (4–0) (7)	Oklahoma (5–0) (8)	Oklahoma (6–0) (6)	Oklahoma State (7–0)	Oklahoma State (8–0)	Stanford (9–0)	Alabama (9–1)	Arkansas (10–1)	Oklahoma State (10–1)	Oklahoma State (11–1)	Oklahoma State (12–1) (4)	3.
4.	LSU (1)	Boise State (1–0) (2)	Boise State (1–0) (2)	Boise State (2–0) (2)	Boise State (3–0) (1)	Wisconsin (5–0)	Wisconsin (5–0)	Wisconsin (6–0)	Stanford (7–0)	Stanford (8–0)	Alabama (8–1)	Oregon (9–1)	Stanford (10–1)	Stanford (11–1)	Stanford (11–1)	Oregon (12–2)	4.
5.	Boise State (2)	Florida State (1–0)	Florida State (2–0)	Stanford (3–0)	Oklahoma State (4–0)	Boise State (4–0) (1)	Boise State (5–0) (1)	Boise State (6–0) (1)	Boise State (7–0) (1)	Boise State (7–0) (1)	Boise State (8–0) (1)	Oklahoma (8–1)	Oklahoma State (10–1)	Virginia Tech (11–1)	USC (10–2)	Arkansas (11–2)	5.
6.	Florida State	Stanford (1–0)	Stanford (2–0)	Wisconsin (3–0)	Stanford (3–0)	Oklahoma State (4–0)	Oklahoma State (5–0)	Oklahoma State (6–0)	Clemson (8–0)	Oregon (7–1)	Oregon (8–1)	Arkansas (9–1)	Virginia Tech (10–1)	Arkansas (10–2)	Oregon (11–2)	USC (10–2)	6.
7.	Stanford	Texas A&M (1–0)	Wisconsin (2–0)	Oklahoma State (3–0)	Wisconsin (4–0)	Stanford (4–0)	Stanford (5–0)	Stanford (6–0)	Oregon (6–1)	Oklahoma (7–1)	Oklahoma (8–1)	Clemson (9–1)	Boise State (9–1)	Houston (12–0)	Arkansas (10–2)	Stanford (11–2)	7.
8.	Texas A&M	Wisconsin (1–0)	Oklahoma State (2–0)	Texas A&M (2–0)	Nebraska (4–0)	Clemson (5–0)	Clemson (6–0)	Clemson (7–0)	Arkansas (6–1)	Arkansas (7–1)	Arkansas (8–1)	Stanford (9–1)	Houston (11–0)	Oregon (10–2)	Boise State (11–1)	Boise State (12–1)	8.
9.	Oklahoma State	Oklahoma State (1–0)	Texas A&M (1–0)	Nebraska (3–0)	Oregon (3–1)	Oregon (3–1)	Oregon (4–1)	Oregon (5–1)	Michigan State (6–1)	Nebraska (7–1)	Clemson (8–1)	Virginia Tech (9–1)	Oregon (9–2)	Boise State (10–1) т	Wisconsin (11–2)	South Carolina (11–2)	9.
10.	Nebraska	Nebraska (1–0)	South Carolina (2–0)	Oregon (2–1)	South Carolina (4–0)	Arkansas (4–1)	Arkansas (5–1)	Arkansas (5–1)	Kansas State (7–0)	South Carolina (7–1)	Virginia Tech (8–1)	Boise State (8–1)	USC (9–2)	USC (10–2) т	South Carolina (10–2)	Wisconsin (11–3)	10.
11.	Wisconsin	Virginia Tech (1–0)	Nebraska (2–0)	Florida State (2–1)	Virginia Tech (4–0)	Texas (4–0)	Michigan (6–0)	West Virginia (5–1)	Oklahoma (6–1)	Clemson (8–1)	Houston (9–0)	Houston (10–0)	Michigan State (9–2)	Michigan State (10–2)	Kansas State (10–2)	Michigan State (11–3)	11.
12.	South Carolina	South Carolina (1–0)	Oregon (1–1)	South Carolina (3–0)	Florida (4–0)	Michigan (5–0)	Georgia Tech (6–0)	Kansas State (6–0)	Wisconsin (6–1)	Virginia Tech (8–1)	Penn State (8–1)	Michigan State (8–2)	Oklahoma (8–2)	Georgia (10–2)	Michigan State (10–3)	Michigan (11–2)	12.
13.	Virginia Tech	Oregon (0–1)	Virginia Tech (2–0)	Virginia Tech (3–0)	Clemson (4–0)	Georgia Tech (5–0)	West Virginia (5–1)	Nebraska (5–1)	Nebraska (6–1)	Michigan (7–1)	Michigan State (7–2)	Georgia (8–2)	Georgia (9–2)	Oklahoma (9–2)	Michigan (10–2)	Baylor (10–3)	13.
14.	TCU	Arkansas (1–0)	Arkansas (2–0)	Arkansas (3–0)	Texas A&M (2–1)	Nebraska (4–1)	Nebraska (5–1)	South Carolina (6–1)	South Carolina (6–1)	Houston (8–0)	Georgia (7–2)	South Carolina (8–2)	South Carolina (9–2)	South Carolina (10–2)	Clemson (10–3)	TCU (11–2)	14.
15.	Arkansas	Ohio State (1–0)	Michigan State (2–0)	Florida (3–0)	Baylor (3–0)	Auburn (4–1)	South Carolina (5–1)	Michigan State (5–1)	Virginia Tech (7–1)	Michigan State (6–2)	South Carolina (7–2)	Wisconsin (8–2)	Wisconsin (9–2)	Wisconsin (10–2)	Baylor (9–3)	Kansas State (10–3)	15.
16.	Notre Dame	Mississippi State (1–0)	Florida (2–0)	West Virginia (3–0)	South Florida (4–0)	West Virginia (4–1)	Illinois (6–0)	Virginia Tech (6–1)	Texas A&M (5–2)	Penn State (8–1)	Wisconsin (7–2)	Kansas State (8–2)	Kansas State (9–2)	Kansas State (9–2)	TCU (10–2)	Oklahoma (10–3)	16.
17.	Michigan State	Michigan State (1–0)	Ohio State (2–0)	Baylor (2–0)	Texas (3–0)	Florida (4–1)	Kansas State (5–0)	Texas A&M (4–2)	Michigan (6–1)	Kansas State (7–1)	Kansas State (7–2)	Nebraska (8–2)	Michigan (9–2)	Michigan (10–2)	Virginia Tech (11–2)	West Virginia (10–3)	17.
18.	Ohio State	Florida (1–0)	West Virginia (2–0)	South Florida (3–0)	Arkansas (3–1)	South Carolina (4–1)	Arizona State (5–1)	Michigan (6–1)	Houston (7–0)	Georgia (6–2)	USC (7–2)	USC (8–2)	Clemson (9–2)	TCU (9–2)	Georgia (10–3)	Houston (13–1)	18.
19.	Georgia	West Virginia (1–0)	Baylor (1–0)	Texas (3–0)	Michigan (4–0)	Illinois (5–0)	Virginia Tech (5–1)	Auburn (5–2)	Texas Tech (5–2)	Wisconsin (6–2)	Nebraska (7–2)	TCU (8–2)	TCU (9–2)	Baylor (8–3)	Oklahoma (9–3)	Georgia (10–4)	19.
20.	Mississippi State	Baylor (1–0)	South Florida (2–0)	TCU (2–1)	TCU (3–1)	Kansas State (4–0)	Baylor (4–1)	Georgia Tech (6–1)	USC (6–1)	Arizona State (6–2)	Georgia Tech (7–2)	Michigan (8–2)	Penn State (9–2)	Nebraska (9–3)	Houston (12–1)	Southern Miss (12–2)	20.
21.	Missouri	Missouri (1–0)	Auburn (2–0)	Clemson (3–0)	Georgia Tech (4–0)	Virginia Tech (4–1)	Texas A&M (3–2)	Houston (6–0)	Penn State (7–1)	USC (6–2)	Texas (6–2)	Penn State (8–2)	Baylor (7–3)	Clemson (9–3)	Nebraska (9–3)	Virginia Tech (11–3)	21.
22.	Florida	South Florida (1–0)	Arizona State (2–0)	Michigan (3–0)	West Virginia (3–1)	Arizona State (4–1)	Texas (4–1)	Washington (5–1)	Georgia (5–2)	Georgia Tech (7–2)	Michigan (7–2)	Southern Miss (9–1)	Nebraska (8–3) т	West Virginia (8–3)	Southern Miss (11–2)	Clemson (10–4)	22.
23.	Auburn	Penn State (1–0)	TCU (1–1) т	USC (3–0)	Florida State (2–2)	Florida State (2–2)	Michigan State (4–1)	Illinois (6–1)	Arizona State (5–2)	Cincinnati (6–1)	Cincinnati (7–1)	Florida State (7–3)	Notre Dame (8–3) т	Penn State (9–3)	West Virginia (9–3)	Florida State (9–4)	23.
24.	West Virginia	Texas (1–0)	Texas (2–0) т	Illinois (3–0)	Illinois (4–0)	Texas A&M (2–2)	Auburn (4–2)	Arizona State (5–2) т	Cincinnati (6–1)	West Virginia (6–2)	Auburn (6–3)	Notre Dame (7–3)	Virginia (8–3)	Southern Miss (10–2)	Penn State (9–3)	Nebraska (9–4)	24.
25.	USC	TCU (0–1)	Mississippi State (1–1)	Georgia Tech (3–0)	Arizona State (3–1)	Baylor (3–1)	Houston (6–0)	Georgia (5–2) т	West Virginia (5–2)	Auburn (6–3)	Southern Miss (8–1)	Baylor (6–3)	Georgia Tech (8–3)	Florida State (8–4)	Florida State (8–4)	Cincinnati (10–3)	25.
	Preseason Aug 20	Week 1 Sep 6	Week 2 Sep 11	Week 3 Sep 18	Week 4 Sep 25	Week 5 Oct 2	Week 6 Oct 9	Week 7 Oct 16	Week 8 Oct 23	Week 9 Oct 30	Week 10 Nov 6	Week 11 Nov 13	Week 12 Nov 20	Week 13 Nov 27	Week 14 Dec 4	Week 15 (Final) Jan 10	
		Dropped: Notre Dame; Georgia; Auburn; USC	Dropped: Missouri; Penn State	Dropped: Michigan State; Ohio State; Auburn; Arizona State; Mississippi State	Dropped: USC	Dropped: South Florida; TCU	Dropped: Florida; Florida State	Dropped: Baylor; Texas	Dropped: Auburn; Georgia Tech; Washington; Illinois	Dropped: Texas A&M; Texas Tech	Dropped: Arizona State; West Virginia	Dropped: Georgia Tech; Texas; Cincinnati; Auburn	Dropped: Southern Miss; Florida State	Dropped: Notre Dame; Virginia; Georgia Tech	None	Dropped: Penn State	

== Coaches Poll ==
	Preseason Aug 4	Week 1 Sep 6	Week 2 Sep 11	Week 3 Sep 18	Week 4 Sep 25	Week 5 Oct 2	Week 6 Oct 9	Week 7 Oct 16	Week 8 Oct 23	Week 9 Oct 30	Week 10 Nov 6	Week 11 Nov 13	Week 12 Nov 20	Week 13 Nov 27	Week 14 Dec 4	Week 15 (Final) Jan 10	
1.	Oklahoma (42)	Oklahoma (1–0) (43)	Oklahoma (1–0) (44)	Oklahoma (2–0) (50)	Oklahoma (3–0) (32)	Oklahoma (4–0) (27)	Oklahoma (5–0) (32)	Oklahoma (6–0) (31)	LSU (8–0) (41)	LSU (8–0) (41)	LSU (9–0) (59)	LSU (10–0) (59)	LSU (11–0) (60)	LSU (12–0) (59)	LSU (13–0) (59)	Alabama (12–1) (59)	1.
2.	Alabama (13)	Alabama (1–0) (9)	Alabama (2–0) (8)	Alabama (3–0) (4)	Alabama (4–0) (7) т	LSU (5–0) (21)	LSU (6–0) (15)	LSU (7–0) (15)	Alabama (8–0) (18)	Alabama (8–0) (18)	Stanford (9–0)	Oklahoma State (10–0)	Alabama (10–1)	Alabama (11–1)	Alabama (11–1)	LSU (13–1)	2.
3.	Oregon (2)	LSU (1–0) (7)	LSU (2–0) (7)	LSU (3–0) (5)	LSU (4–0) (20) т	Alabama (5–0) (10)	Alabama (6–0) (11)	Alabama (7–0) (12)	Stanford (7–0)	Stanford (8–0)	Oklahoma State (9–0)	Alabama (9–1)	Arkansas (10–1)	Virginia Tech (11–1)	Oklahoma State (11–1)	Oklahoma State (12–1)	3.
4.	LSU (2)	Florida State (1–0)	Boise State (1–0)	Boise State (2–0)	Stanford (3–0)	Stanford (4–0)	Wisconsin (5–0) (1)	Wisconsin (6–0) (1)	Oklahoma State (7–0)	Oklahoma State (8–0)	Alabama (8–1)	Oregon (9–1)	Virginia Tech (10–1)	Stanford (11–1)	Stanford (11–1)	Oregon (12–2)	4.
5.	Florida State	Boise State (1–0)	Florida State (2–0)	Stanford (3–0)	Boise State (3–0)	Wisconsin (5–0) (1)	Stanford (5–0)	Stanford (6–0)	Boise State (7–0)	Boise State (7–0)	Boise State (8–0)	Oklahoma (8–1)	Stanford (10–1)	Oklahoma State (10–1)	Oregon (11–2)	Arkansas (11–2)	5.
6.	Stanford	Stanford (1–0)	Stanford (2–0)	Oklahoma State (3–0)	Oklahoma State (4–0)	Boise State (4–0)	Boise State (5–0)	Oklahoma State (6–0)	Clemson (8–0)	Oregon (7–1)	Oregon (8–1)	Arkansas (9–1)	Oklahoma State (10–1)	Houston (12–0)	Boise State (11–1)	Boise State (12–1)	6.
7.	Boise State	Oklahoma State (1–0)	Oklahoma State (2–0)	Wisconsin (3–0)	Wisconsin (4–0)	Oklahoma State (4–0)	Oklahoma State (5–0)	Boise State (6–0)	Oregon (6–1)	Oklahoma (7–1)	Oklahoma (8–1)	Virginia Tech (9–1)	Houston (11–0)	Oregon (10–2)	Arkansas (10–2)	Stanford (11–2)	7.
8.	Oklahoma State	Texas A&M (1–0)	Wisconsin (2–0)	Texas A&M (2–0)	Nebraska (4–0)	Clemson (5–0)	Clemson (6–0)	Clemson (7–0) т	Arkansas (6–1)	Arkansas (7–1)	Arkansas (8–1)	Clemson (9–1)	Boise State (9–1)	Boise State (10–1)	Wisconsin (11–2)	South Carolina (11–2)	8.
9.	Texas A&M	Wisconsin (1–0)	Texas A&M (1–0)	Nebraska (3–0)	South Carolina (4–0)	Oregon (3–1)	Oregon (4–1)	Oregon (5–1) т	Oklahoma (6–1)	Nebraska (7–1)	Virginia Tech (8–1)	Stanford (9–1)	Oregon (9–2)	Michigan State (10–2)	South Carolina (10–2)	Michigan (11–2)	9.
10.	Wisconsin	Nebraska (1–0)	Nebraska (2–0)	South Carolina (3–0)	Virginia Tech (4–0)	Texas (4–0)	Michigan (6–0)	Arkansas (5–1)	Michigan State (6–1)	South Carolina (7–1)	Clemson (8–1)	Houston (10–0)	Michigan State (9–2)	Arkansas (10–2)	Kansas State (10–2)	Michigan State (11–3)	10.
11.	Nebraska	Virginia Tech (1–0)	South Carolina (2–0)	Virginia Tech (3–0)	Oregon (3–1)	Michigan (5–0)	Arkansas (5–1)	Nebraska (5–1)	Wisconsin (6–1)	Virginia Tech (8–1)	Houston (9–0)	Boise State (8–1)	Oklahoma (8–2)	Oklahoma (9–2)	Virginia Tech (11–2)	Wisconsin (11–3)	11.
12.	South Carolina	South Carolina (1–0)	Virginia Tech (2–0)	Arkansas (3–0)	Florida (4–0)	Arkansas (4–1)	Georgia Tech (6–0)	South Carolina (6–1)	Kansas State (7–0)	Clemson (8–1)	Penn State (8–1)	Michigan State (8–2)	Wisconsin (9–2)	Wisconsin (10–2)	Michigan (10–2)	Baylor (10–3)	12.
13.	Virginia Tech	Arkansas (1–0)	Arkansas (2–0)	Oregon (2–1)	Texas A&M (2–1)	Georgia Tech (5–0)	South Carolina (5–1)	Michigan State (5–1)	Nebraska (6–1)	Michigan (7–1)	Michigan State (7–2)	Wisconsin (8–2)	South Carolina (9–2)	South Carolina (10–2)	Michigan State (10–3)	TCU (11–2)	13.
14.	Arkansas	Oregon (0–1)	Oregon (1–1)	Florida State (2–1)	South Florida (4–0)	South Carolina (4–1)	Nebraska (5–1)	Virginia Tech (6–1) т	South Carolina (6–1)	Houston (8–0)	Wisconsin (7–2)	South Carolina (8–2)	Georgia (9–2)	Georgia (10–2)	Clemson (10–3)	Houston (13–1)	14.
15.	TCU	Ohio State (1–0)	Michigan State (2–0)	Florida (3–0)	Clemson (4–0)	Nebraska (4–1)	Illinois (6–0)	West Virginia (5–1) т	Virginia Tech (7–1)	Penn State (8–1)	South Carolina (7–2)	Georgia (8–2)	Kansas State (9–2)	Kansas State (9–2)	TCU (10–2)	Oklahoma (10–3)	15.
16.	Ohio State	Michigan State (1–0)	Ohio State (2–0)	West Virginia (3–0)	Baylor (3–0)	Illinois (5–0)	West Virginia (5–1)	Kansas State (6–0)	Texas A&M (5–2)	Michigan State (6–2)	Georgia (7–2)	Nebraska (8–2)	Michigan (9–2)	Michigan (10–2)	Baylor (9–3)	Kansas State (10–3)	16.
17.	Michigan State	Mississippi State (1–0)	Florida (2–0)	South Florida (3–0)	Texas (3–0)	Virginia Tech (4–1)	Virginia Tech (5–1)	Michigan (6–1)	Michigan (6–1)	Wisconsin (6–2)	Nebraska (7–2)	Kansas State (8–2)	Clemson (9–2)	TCU (9–2)	Houston (12–1)	Virginia Tech (11–3)	17.
18.	Notre Dame	Florida (1–0)	Arizona State (2–0)	Texas (3–0)	Arkansas (3–1)	Florida (4–1)	Kansas State (5–0)	Texas A&M (4–2)	Houston (7–0)	Arizona State (6–2)	Cincinnati (7–1)	Michigan (8–2)	TCU (9–2)	Baylor (8–3)	Georgia (10–3)	West Virginia (10–3)	18.
19.	Auburn	Missouri (1–0)	Auburn (2–0)	Baylor (2–0)	Michigan (4–0)	West Virginia (4–1)	Michigan State (4–1)	Georgia Tech (6–1)	Penn State (7–1)	Kansas State (7–1)	Georgia Tech (7–2)	TCU (8–2)	Penn State (9–2)	Nebraska (9–3)	Oklahoma (9–3)	Southern Miss (12–2)	19.
20.	Mississippi State	Penn State (1–0)	West Virginia (2–0)	TCU (2–1)	TCU (3–1)	Michigan State (4–1)	Arizona State (5–1)	Houston (6–0)	Arizona State (5–2)	Georgia (6–2)	Texas (6–2)	Southern Miss (9–1)	Baylor (7–3)	West Virginia (8–3)	Nebraska (9–3)	Georgia (10–4)	20.
21.	Missouri	Texas (1–0)	Texas (2–0)	Michigan (3–0)	Georgia Tech (4–0)	Kansas State (4–0)	Texas (4–1)	Illinois (6–1)	Georgia (5–2)	West Virginia (6–2)	Michigan (7–2)	Penn State (8–2)	Georgia Tech (8–3)	Clemson (9–3)	Southern Miss (11–2)	Cincinnati (10–3)	21.
22.	Georgia	Auburn (1–0)	South Florida (2–0)	Clemson (3–0)	Illinois (4–0)	Florida State (2–2)	Houston (6–0)	Penn State (6–1)	Texas Tech (5–2)	Cincinnati (6–1)	Kansas State (7–2)	Florida State (7–3)	Nebraska (8–3)	Penn State (9–3)	West Virginia (9–3)	Clemson (10–4)	22.
23.	Florida	Arizona State (1–0)	TCU (1–1)	Michigan State (2–1)	West Virginia (3–1)	Auburn (4–1)	Texas A&M (3–2)	Auburn (5–2)	Cincinnati (6–1)	Georgia Tech (7–2)	Southern Miss (8–1)	Georgia Tech (7–3) т	West Virginia (7–3)	Southern Miss (10–2)	Penn State (9–3)	Florida State (9–4)	23.
24.	Texas	West Virginia (1–0)	Baylor (1–0)	Georgia Tech (3–0)	Florida State (2–2)	Arizona State (4–1)	Baylor (4–1)	Washington (5–1)	West Virginia (5–2)	Southern Miss (7–1)	TCU (7–2)	West Virginia (7–3) т	Notre Dame (8–3)	Florida State (8–4)	Cincinnati (9–3)	Nebraska (9–4)	24.
25.	Penn State	TCU (0–1)	Mississippi State (1–1)	North Carolina (3–0)	Michigan State (3–1)	Texas A&M (2–2)	Penn State (5–1)	Arizona State (5–2)	Southern Miss (6–1)	Texas (5–2)	Auburn (6–3)	Notre Dame (7–3)	Virginia (8–3)	Cincinnati (8–4)	Florida State (8–4)	BYU (10–3)	25.
	Preseason Aug 4	Week 1 Sep 6	Week 2 Sep 11	Week 3 Sep 18	Week 4 Sep 25	Week 5 Oct 2	Week 6 Oct 9	Week 7 Oct 16	Week 8 Oct 23	Week 9 Oct 30	Week 10 Nov 6	Week 11 Nov 13	Week 12 Nov 20	Week 13 Nov 27	Week 14 Dec 4	Week 15 (Final) Jan 10	
		Dropped: Notre Dame; Georgia	Dropped: Missouri; Penn State	Dropped: Ohio State; Arizona State; Auburn; Mississippi State	Dropped: North Carolina	Dropped: Baylor; South Florida; TCU	Dropped: Florida; Florida State; Auburn	Dropped: Texas; Baylor	Dropped: Georgia Tech; Illinois; Auburn; Washington	Dropped: Texas A&M; Texas Tech	Dropped: Arizona State; West Virginia	Dropped: Cincinnati; Texas; Auburn	Dropped: Southern Miss; Florida State	Dropped: Georgia Tech; Notre Dame; Virginia	None	Dropped: Penn State	

== Harris Interactive Poll ==
	Week 6 Oct 9	Week 7 Oct 16	Week 8 Oct 23	Week 9 Oct 30	Week 10 Nov 6	Week 11 Nov 13	Week 12 Nov 20	Week 13 Nov 27	Week 14 (Final) Dec 4	
1.	LSU (6–0) (71)	LSU (7–0) (74)	LSU (8–0) (94)	LSU (8–0) (93)	LSU (9–0) (112)	LSU (10–0) (115)	LSU (11–0) (115)	LSU (12–0) (115)	LSU (13–0) (115)	1.
2.	Alabama (6–0) (17)	Alabama (7–0) (25)	Alabama (8–0) (20)	Alabama (8–0) (21)	Oklahoma State (9–0)	Oklahoma State (10–0)	Alabama (10–1)	Alabama (11–1)	Alabama (11–1)	2.
3.	Oklahoma (5–0) (24)	Oklahoma (6–0) (13)	Oklahoma State (7–0)	Oklahoma State (8–0)	Stanford (9–0) (2)	Alabama (9–1)	Arkansas (10–1)	Stanford (11–1)	Oklahoma State (11–1)	3.
4.	Wisconsin (5–0) (1)	Wisconsin (6–0) (1)	Stanford (7–0) (1)	Stanford (8–0) (1)	Alabama (8–1)	Oregon (9–1)	Stanford (10–1)	Virginia Tech (11–1)	Stanford (11–1)	4.
5.	Boise State (5–0) (1)	Boise State (6–0) (1)	Boise State (7–0)	Boise State (7–0)	Boise State (8–0)	Oklahoma (8–1)	Virginia Tech (10–1)	Oklahoma State (10–1)	Oregon (11–2)	5.
6.	Oklahoma State (5–0)	Oklahoma State (6–0)	Clemson (8–0)	Oregon (7–1)	Oregon (8–1)	Arkansas (9–1)	Oklahoma State (10–1)	Houston (12–0)	Boise State (11–1)	6.
7.	Stanford (5–0) (1)	Stanford (6–0) (1)	Oregon (6–1)	Oklahoma (7–1)	Oklahoma (8–1)	Stanford (9–1)	Houston (11–0)	Oregon (10–2)	Arkansas (10–2)	7.
8.	Clemson (6–0)	Clemson (7–0)	Oklahoma (6–1)	Arkansas (7–1)	Arkansas (8–1)	Clemson (9–1)	Boise State (9–1)	Boise State (10–1)	Wisconsin (11–2)	8.
9.	Oregon (4–1)	Oregon (5–1)	Arkansas (6–1)	Nebraska (7–1)	Clemson (8–1)	Virginia Tech (9–1)	Oregon (9–2)	Arkansas (10–2)	South Carolina (10–2)	9.
10.	Michigan (6–0)	Arkansas (5–1)	Kansas State (7–0)	Clemson (8–1)	Virginia Tech (8–1)	Houston (10–0)	Oklahoma (8–2)	Oklahoma (9–2)	Kansas State (10–2)	10.
11.	Arkansas (5–1)	Nebraska (5–1)	Michigan State (6–1)	South Carolina (7–1)	Houston (9–0)	Boise State (8–1)	Michigan State (9–2)	Michigan State (10–2)	Virginia Tech (11–2)	11.
12.	Georgia Tech (6–0)	Kansas State (6–0)	Wisconsin (6–1)	Virginia Tech (8–1)	Penn State (8–1)	Michigan State (8–2)	Georgia (9–2)	Georgia (10–2)	Michigan (10–2)	12.
13.	Nebraska (5–1)	South Carolina (6–1)	Nebraska (6–1)	Michigan (7–1)	Michigan State (7–2)	Wisconsin (8–2)	South Carolina (9–2)	Wisconsin (10–2)	Michigan State (10–3)	13.
14.	Illinois (6–0)	West Virginia (5–1)	South Carolina (6–1)	Houston (8–0)	Wisconsin (7–2)	Georgia (8–2)	Wisconsin (9–2)	South Carolina (10–2)	Clemson (10–3)	14.
15.	South Carolina (5–1)	Michigan State (5–1)	Virginia Tech (7–1)	Kansas State (7–1)	Georgia (7–2)	South Carolina (8–2)	Kansas State (9–2)	Kansas State (9–2)	TCU (10–2)	15.
16.	West Virginia (5–1)	Virginia Tech (6–1)	Michigan (6–1)	Penn State (8–1)	South Carolina (7–2)	Nebraska (8–2)	Michigan (9–2)	Michigan (10–2)	Baylor (9–3)	16.
17.	Kansas State (5–0)	Michigan (6–1)	Texas A&M (5–2)	Michigan State (6–2)	Nebraska (7–2)	Kansas State (8–2)	Clemson (9–2)	TCU (9–2)	Houston (12–1)	17.
18.	Virginia Tech (5–1)	Georgia Tech (6–1)	Houston (7–0)	Wisconsin (6–2)	Kansas State (7–2)	Michigan (8–2)	Penn State (9–2)	Baylor (8–3)	Georgia (10–3)	18.
19.	Arizona State (5–1)	Texas A&M (4–2)	Penn State (7–1)	Arizona State (6–2)	Georgia Tech (7–2)	Penn State (8–2)	TCU (9–2)	Nebraska (9–3)	Oklahoma (9–3)	19.
20.	Texas (4–1)	Illinois (6–1)	Arizona State (5–2)	Georgia (6–2)	Texas (6–2)	Southern Miss (9–1)	Baylor (7–3)	Clemson (9–3)	Nebraska (9–3)	20.
21.	Baylor (4–1)	Auburn (5–2)	Texas Tech (5–2)	Georgia Tech (7–2)	Michigan (7–2)	TCU (8–2)	Nebraska (8–3)	West Virginia (8–3)	Southern Miss (11–2)	21.
22.	Michigan State (4–1)	Houston (6–0)	Georgia (5–2)	West Virginia (6–2)	Cincinnati (7–1)	West Virginia (7–3)	Georgia Tech (8–3)	Penn State (9–3)	West Virginia (9–3)	22.
23.	Texas A&M (3–2)	Arizona State (5–2)	West Virginia (5–2)	Cincinnati (6–1)	Southern Miss (8–1)	Florida State (7–3)	Notre Dame (8–3)	Southern Miss (10–2)	Penn State (9–3)	23.
24.	Houston (6–0)	Penn State (6–1)	Cincinnati (6–1)	Texas (5–2)	Auburn (6–3)	Georgia Tech (7–3)	West Virginia (7–3)	Florida State (8–4)	Cincinnati (9–3)	24.
25.	Florida (4–2)	Washington (5–1)	Texas (4–2)	Auburn (6–3)	TCU (7–2)	Baylor (6–3)	Virginia (8–3)	Texas (7–4)	Florida State (8–4)	25.
	Week 6 Oct 9	Week 7 Oct 16	Week 8 Oct 23	Week 9 Oct 30	Week 10 Nov 6	Week 11 Nov 13	Week 12 Nov 20	Week 13 Nov 27	Week 14 (Final) Dec 4	
		Dropped: Texas; Baylor; Florida	Dropped: Georgia Tech; Illinois; Auburn; Washington	Dropped: Texas A&M; Texas Tech	Dropped: Arizona State; West Virginia	Dropped: Texas; Cincinnati; Auburn	Dropped: Southern Miss; Florida State	Dropped: Georgia Tech; Notre Dame; Virginia	Dropped: Texas	

== BCS standings ==
	Week 7 Oct 16	Week 8 Oct 23	Week 9 Oct 30	Week 10 Nov 6	Week 11 Nov 13	Week 12 Nov 20	Week 13 Nov 27	Week 14 (Final) Dec 4	
1.	LSU (7–0)	LSU (8–0)	LSU (8–0)	LSU (9–0)	LSU (10–0)	LSU (11–0)	LSU (12–0)	LSU (13–0)	1.
2.	Alabama (7–0)	Alabama (8–0)	Alabama (8–0)	Oklahoma State (9–0)	Oklahoma State (10–0)	Alabama (10–1)	Alabama (11–1)	Alabama (11–1)	2.
3.	Oklahoma (6–0)	Oklahoma State (7–0)	Oklahoma State (8–0)	Alabama (8–1)	Alabama (9–1)	Arkansas (10–1)	Oklahoma State (10–1)	Oklahoma State (11–1)	3.
4.	Oklahoma State (6–0)	Boise State (7–0)	Stanford (8–0)	Stanford (9–0)	Oregon (9–1)	Oklahoma State (10–1)	Stanford (11–1)	Stanford (11–1)	4.
5.	Boise State (6–0)	Clemson (8–0)	Boise State (7–0)	Boise State (8–0)	Oklahoma (8–1)	Virginia Tech (10–1)	Virginia Tech (11–1)	Oregon (11–2)	5.
6.	Wisconsin (6–0)	Stanford (7–0)	Oklahoma (7–1)	Oklahoma (8–1)	Arkansas (9–1)	Stanford (10–1)	Houston (12–0)	Arkansas (10–2)	6.
7.	Clemson (7–0)	Oregon (6–1)	Arkansas (7–1)	Oregon (8–1)	Clemson (9–1)	Boise State (9–1)	Boise State (10–1)	Boise State (11–1)	7.
8.	Stanford (6–0)	Kansas State (7–0)	Oregon (7–1)	Arkansas (8–1)	Virginia Tech (9–1)	Houston (11–0)	Arkansas (10–2)	Kansas State (10–2)	8.
9.	Arkansas (5–1)	Oklahoma (6–1)	South Carolina (7–1)	Clemson (8–1)	Stanford (9–1)	Oklahoma (8–2)	Oregon (10–2)	South Carolina (10–2)	9.
10.	Oregon (5–1)	Arkansas (6–1)	Nebraska (7–1)	Virginia Tech (8–1)	Boise State (8–1)	Oregon (9–2)	Oklahoma (9–2)	Wisconsin (11–2)	10.
11.	Kansas State (6–0)	Michigan State (6–1)	Clemson (8–1)	Houston (9–0)	Houston (10–0)	Kansas State (9–2)	Kansas State (9–2)	Virginia Tech (11–2)	11.
12.	Virginia Tech (6–1)	Virginia Tech (7–1)	Virginia Tech (8–1)	Penn State (8–1)	South Carolina (8–2)	South Carolina (9–2)	South Carolina (10–2)	Baylor (9–3)	12.
13.	Nebraska (5–1)	South Carolina (6–1)	Houston (8–0)	South Carolina (7–2)	Kansas State (8–2)	Georgia (9–2)	Michigan State (10–2)	Michigan (10–2)	13.
14.	South Carolina (6–1)	Nebraska (6–1)	Kansas State (7–1)	Kansas State (7–2)	Georgia (8–2)	Michigan State (9–2)	Georgia (10–2)	Oklahoma (9–3)	14.
15.	West Virginia (5–1)	Wisconsin (6–1)	Michigan (7–1)	Georgia (7–2)	Michigan State (8–2)	Michigan (9–2)	Wisconsin (10–2)	Clemson (10–3)	15.
16.	Michigan State (5–1)	Texas A&M (5–2)	Penn State (8–1)	Texas (6–2)	Nebraska (8–2)	Wisconsin (9–2)	Michigan (10–2)	Georgia (10–3)	16.
17.	Texas A&M (4–2)	Houston (7–0)	Michigan State (6–2)	Michigan State (7–2)	Wisconsin (8–2)	Clemson (9–2)	Baylor (8–3)	Michigan State (10–3)	17.
18.	Michigan (6–1)	Michigan (6–1)	Georgia (6–2)	Wisconsin (7–2)	Michigan (8–2)	Baylor (7–3)	TCU (9–2)	TCU (10–2)	18.
19.	Houston (6–0)	Penn State (7–1)	Arizona State (6–2)	Nebraska (7–2)	TCU (8–2)	Penn State (9–2)	Nebraska (9–3)	Houston (12–1)	19.
20.	Auburn (5–2)	Texas Tech (5–2)	Wisconsin (6–2)	Auburn (6–3)	Southern Miss (9–1)	TCU (9–2)	Clemson (9–3)	Nebraska (9–3)	20.
21.	Penn State (6–1)	Arizona State (5–2)	Texas (5–2)	Georgia Tech (7–2)	Penn State (8–2)	Nebraska (8–3)	Penn State (9–3)	Southern Miss (11–2)	21.
22.	Georgia Tech (6–1)	Georgia (5–2)	Auburn (6–3)	Southern Miss (8–1)	Baylor (6–3)	Notre Dame (8–3)	Texas (7–4)	Penn State (9–3)	22.
23.	Illinois (6–1)	Auburn (5–3)	Georgia Tech (7–2)	Cincinnati (7–1)	Texas (6–3)	Georgia Tech (8–3)	West Virginia (8–3)	West Virginia (9–3)	23.
24.	Texas (4–2)	Texas (4–2)	West Virginia (6–2)	Michigan (7–2)	Auburn (6–4)	Auburn (7–4)	Southern Miss (10–2)	Texas (7–5)	24.
25.	Washington (5–1)	West Virginia (5–2)	Southern Miss (7–1)	Baylor (5–3)	Florida State (7–3)	Texas (6–4)	Missouri (7–5)	Auburn (7–5)	25.
	Week 7 Oct 16	Week 8 Oct 23	Week 9 Oct 30	Week 10 Nov 6	Week 11 Nov 13	Week 12 Nov 20	Week 13 Nov 27	Week 14 (Final) Dec 4	
		Dropped: Georgia Tech; Illinois; Washington	Dropped: Texas A&M; Texas Tech	Dropped: Arizona State; West Virginia	Dropped: Georgia Tech; Cincinnati	Dropped: Southern Miss; Florida State	Dropped: Notre Dame; Georgia Tech; Auburn	Dropped: Missouri	
