= Keshawn Martin =

American football player (born 1990)

No. 82, 19
- Position: Wide receiver

Personal information
- Born: March 15, 1990 (age 36); Inkster, Michigan, U.S.
- Listed height: 5 ft 10 in (1.78 m)
- Listed weight: 190 lb (86 kg)

Career information
- High school: Westland (MI) John Glenn
- College: Michigan State (2008-2011)
- NFL draft: 2012: 4th round, 121st overall pick

Career history
- Houston Texans (2012–2015); New England Patriots (2015); San Francisco 49ers (2016); Detroit Lions (2017)*
- * Offseason or practice squad member only

Career NFL statistics
- Receptions: 62
- Receiving yards: 685
- Receiving touchdowns: 5
- Return yards: 2,859
- Return touchdowns: 1
- Stats at Pro Football Reference

Keshawn Charles Martin (born March 15, 1990) is an American former professional football player who was a wide receiver in the National Football League (NFL). He played college football for the Michigan State Spartans and was selected by the Houston Texans in the fourth round with the 121st overall pick of the 2012 NFL draft.

== Professional career ==
=== Houston Texans ===
Martin was selected in the fourth round by the Houston Texans in the 2012 NFL draft. After Trindon Holliday was cut from the Houston Texans, Martin took over the returning duties full-time. On November 18, 2013, Martin caught a 9-yard touchdown pass from Matt Schaub against the Jacksonville Jaguars for his first career touchdown. He also returned a punt 73 yards in the same game to set up another score.

=== New England Patriots ===
On September 16, 2015, Martin and a sixth-round 2016 draft pick were traded to the New England Patriots for a 2016 fifth-round pick (which Houston later used to select D. J. Reader). During the regular season, Martin played in nine games and caught 24 passes for 269 yards and two touchdowns.

On January 16, 2016, the Patriots signed Martin to a two-year, $2.975 million extension. On September 3, Martin was released by the Patriots as a part of final roster cuts.

=== San Francisco 49ers ===
On September 27, 2016, the San Francisco 49ers signed Martin to a two-year contract. He was released by the 49ers on November 8.

=== Detroit Lions ===
On March 11, 2017, Martin signed with the Detroit Lions. He was released by the team on August 28.
