= 2011 Florida Gators football team =

American college football season

2011 Florida Gators football

Gator Bowl champion

Gator Bowl, W 24–17 vs. Ohio State
- Conference: Southeastern Conference
- Eastern Division
- Record: 7–6 (3–5 SEC)
- Head coach: Will Muschamp (1st season)
- Offensive coordinator: Charlie Weis (1st season)
- Offensive scheme: Pro-style
- Defensive coordinator: Dan Quinn (1st season)
- Base defense: Multiple 4–3
- Home stadium: Ben Hill Griffin Stadium

Uniform

2011 Southeastern Conference football standings
	Conf.			Overall
Team	W		L	W		L
Eastern Division
No. 19 Georgia x	7	–	1	10	–	4
No. 9 South Carolina	6	–	2	11	–	2
Florida	3	–	5	7	–	6
Vanderbilt	2	–	6	6	–	7
Kentucky	2	–	6	5	–	7
Tennessee	1	–	7	5	–	7
Western Division
No. 2 LSU x$	8	–	0	13	–	1
No. 1 Alabama %#	7	–	1	12	–	1
No. 5 Arkansas	6	–	2	11	–	2
Auburn	4	–	4	8	–	5
Mississippi State	2	–	6	7	–	6
Ole Miss*	0	–	8	2	–	10
Championship: LSU 42, Georgia 10
# – BCS National Champion; $ – BCS representative as conference champion; % – BCS at-large representative; x – Division champion/co-champions; * Ole Miss vacated all wins due to NCAA violations.; Rankings from AP Poll

The 2011 Florida Gators football team represented the University of Florida in the sport of American football during the 2011 college football season. The Gators competed in the Football Bowl Subdivision (FBS) of the National Collegiate Athletic Association (NCAA) and the Eastern Division of the Southeastern Conference (SEC). They played their home games at Ben Hill Griffin Stadium on the university's Gainesville, Florida campus, and were led by first-year head coach Will Muschamp. Muschamp coached the Gators to a third-place finish in the SEC East, a 3–5 conference record, a 24–17 Gator Bowl victory over the Ohio State Buckeyes, and an overall win–loss record of 7–6 (.539).

== Schedule ==
Date	Opponent	Rank	Site	TV	Result	Attendance
September 3	Florida Atlantic*	No. 22	Ben Hill Griffin Stadium; Gainesville, FL	ESPNU	W 41–3	88,708
September 10	UAB*	No. 18	Ben Hill Griffin Stadium; Gainesville, FL	FSN	W 39–0	87,473
September 17	Tennessee	No. 16	Ben Hill Griffin Stadium; Gainesville, FL (rivalry)	CBS	W 33–23	90,744
September 24	at Kentucky	No. 15	Commonwealth Stadium; Lexington, KY (rivalry)	ESPN	W 48–10	65,134
October 1	No. 3 Alabama	No. 12	Ben Hill Griffin Stadium; Gainesville, FL (rivalry)	CBS	L 10–38	90,888
October 8	at No. 1 LSU	No. 17	Tiger Stadium; Baton Rouge, LA (rivalry)	CBS	L 11–41	93,022
October 15	at No. 24 Auburn		Jordan–Hare Stadium; Auburn, AL (rivalry)	ESPN	L 6–17	87,451
October 29	vs. No. 22 Georgia		EverBank Field; Jacksonville, FL (rivalry)	CBS	L 20–24	84,524
November 5	Vanderbilt^{†}		Ben Hill Griffin Stadium; Gainesville, FL	SECN	W 26–21	90,144
November 12	at No. 15 South Carolina		Williams–Brice Stadium; Columbia, SC	CBS	L 12–17	80,250
November 19	No. 24 (FCS) Furman*		Ben Hill Griffin Stadium; Gainesville, FL	PPV	W 54–32	84,674
November 26	Florida State*		Ben Hill Griffin Stadium; Gainesville, FL (rivalry)	ESPN2	L 7–21	90,798
January 2, 2012	vs. Ohio State*		EverBank Field; Jacksonville, FL (Gator Bowl)	ESPN2	W 24–17	61,312
*Non-conference game; ^{†}Homecoming; Rankings from AP Poll released prior to the game

== Rankings ==
Ranking movements Legend: ██ Increase in ranking ██ Decrease in ranking — = Not ranked RV = Received votes
	Week															
Poll	Pre	1	2	3	4	5	6	7	8	9	10	11	12	13	14	Final
AP	22	18	16	15	12	17	RV	—	—	—	—	—	—	—	—	—
Coaches	23	18	17	15	12	18	RV	—	RV	—	—	—	—	—	—	—
Harris	Not released						25	—	—	—	—	—	—	—	—	Not released
BCS	Not released							—	—	—	—	—	—	—	—	Not released

== Game summaries ==
=== Florida Atlantic ===
Will Muschamp's debut as head coach for Florida was a success as the Gators defeated the Owls 41–3.

Team	1	2	3	4	Total
Florida Atlantic	0	3	0	0	3
• Florida	10	14	7	10	41

- Date: September 3
- Location: Ben Hill Griffin Stadium, Gainesville, FL
- Game start: 7:03 p.m. EST
- Elapsed time: 3:13
- Game attendance: 88,708
- Game weather: 88 F, wind 8 ESE
- Referee: Steve Shaw
- TV announcers (ESPNU): Clay Matvick, Brian Griese & Allison Williams

Scoring summary
1	8:28	FLA	Caleb Sturgis 51-yard field goal	FLA 3–0
1	2:41	FLA	Chris Rainey 14-yard pass from John Brantley (Caleb Sturgis kick)	FLA 10–0
2	14:52	FLA	Jeff Demps 35-yard run (Caleb Sturgis kick)	FLA 17–0
2	8:34	FLA	Chris Rainey 14-yard run (Caleb Sturgis kick)	FLA 24–0
2	1:22	FAU	Vinny Zaccario 27-yard field goal	FLA 24–3
3	10:09	FLA	Chris Rainey 22-yard blocked punt return (Caleb Sturgis kick)	FLA 31–3
4	11:18	FLA	Jeff Demps 20-yard run (Caleb Sturgis kick)	FLA 38–3
4	1:46	FLA	Caleb Sturgis 29-yard field goal	FLA 41–3

=== UAB ===
Team	1	2	3	4	Total
UAB	0	0	0	0	0
• Florida	13	12	14	0	39

- Date: September 10
- Location: Ben Hill Griffin Stadium, Gainesville, FL

=== Tennessee ===
Team	1	2	3	4	Total
Tennessee	0	7	6	10	23
• Florida	10	6	14	3	33

- Date: September 17
- Location: Ben Hill Griffin Stadium, Gainesville, FL
- Game start: 3:30 p.m. EST
- Television network: CBS

Scoring summary
1	10:45	FLA	Trey Burton 1-yard pass from John Brantley (Caleb Sturgis kick)	FLA 7–0
1	1:10	FLA	Caleb Sturgis 28-yard field goal	FLA 10–0
2	11:57	FLA	Caleb Sturgis 30-yard field goal	FLA 13–0
2	8:31	FLA	Caleb Sturgis 46-yard field goal	FLA 16–0
2	1:43	TEN	Marlin Lane 8-yard pass from Tyler Bray (Michael Parlady kick)	FLA 16–7
3	11:41	FLA	Trey Burton 1-yard run (Caleb Sturgis kick)	FLA 23–7
3	8:08	FLA	Chris Rainey 83-yard pass from John Brantley (Caleb Sturgis kick)	FLA 30–7
3	4:25	TEN	Da'Rick Rogers 14-yard pass from Tyler Bray (pass failed)	FLA 30–13
4	13:33	TEN	Michael Parlady 20-yard field goal	FLA 30–16
4	7:19	FLA	Caleb Sturgis 42-yard field goal	FLA 33–16
4	4:46	TEN	Mychal Rivera 18-yard pass from Tyler Bray (Michael Parlady kick)	FLA 33–23

=== Kentucky ===
Team	1	2	3	4	Total
• Florida	21	10	10	7	48
Kentucky	3	7	0	0	10

- Date: September 24
- Location: Commonwealth Stadium, Lexington, KY
- Television network: ESPN

=== Alabama ===
Team	1	2	3	4	Total
• Alabama	10	14	0	14	38
Florida	10	0	0	0	10

- Date: October 1
- Location: Ben Hill Griffin Stadium, Gainesville, FL
- Television network: CBS

=== LSU ===
Team	1	2	3	4	Total
Florida	0	3	8	0	11
• LSU	14	10	3	14	41

- Date: October 8
- Location: Tiger Stadium, Baton Rouge, LA
- Television network: CBS

=== Auburn ===
Team	1	2	3	4	Total
Florida	0	6	0	0	6
• Auburn	7	0	0	10	17

- Date: October 15
- Location: Jordan–Hare Stadium, Auburn, AL
- Television network: ESPN

=== Georgia ===
Team	1	2	3	4	Total
• Georgia	0	10	7	7	24
Florida	7	10	3	0	20

- Date: October 29
- Location: EverBank Field, Jacksonville, FL
- Television network: CBS

=== Vanderbilt ===
Team	1	2	3	4	Total
Vanderbilt	0	0	7	14	21
• Florida	0	17	3	6	26

- Date: November 5
- Location: Ben Hill Griffin Stadium, Gainesville, FL
- Television network: SEC TV

=== South Carolina ===
Team	1	2	3	4	Total
Florida	3	0	3	6	12
• South Carolina	0	14	0	3	17

- Date: November 12
- Location: Williams-Brice Stadium, Columbia, SC
- Television network: CBS

=== Furman ===
Team	1	2	3	4	Total
Furman	22	0	10	0	32
• Florida	7	20	10	17	54

- Date: November 19
- Location: Ben Hill Griffin Stadium, Gainesville, FL

=== Florida State ===
Team	1	2	3	4	Total
• Florida State	7	7	0	7	21
Florida	0	0	0	7	7

- Date: November 26
- Location: Ben Hill Griffin Stadium, Gainesville, FL

=== Gator Bowl ===
Team	1	2	3	4	Total
Ohio State	0	10	0	7	17
• Florida	7	7	7	3	24

- Date: January 2
- Location: EverBank Field, Jacksonville, FL

== Personnel ==
=== Coaching staff ===
Name	Position	Joined staff
Will Muschamp	Head coach	2011
Charlie Weis	Offensive coordinator Quarterbacks	2011
Dan Quinn	Defensive coordinator	2011
D.J. Durkin	Linebackers; Special Teams	2010
Aubrey Hill	Wide Receivers; Recruiting coordinator	2011
Frank Verducci	Offensive line Running game coordinator	2011
Brian White	Running backs	2009
Derek Lewis	Tight ends	2011
Travaris Robinson	Defensive backs	2011
Bryant Young	Defensive line	2011
Coleman Hutzler	Special teams coordinator Linebackers	2010

=== Roster ===
2011 Florida Gators roster
Quarterbacks: 12 John Brantley – (redshirt) Senior; 16 Jeff Driskel – Freshman; 19 Ryan McGriff – Freshman; 14 Chandler Carr – Sophomore; 13 Christian Provancha – Sophomore; 18 Ryan Parrish – Sophomore; 17 Jacoby Brissett – Freshman; 10 Tyler Murphy – (redshirt) Freshman; Halfbacks: 28 Jeff Demps – Senior; 38 Phillip Bellino – Senior; 1 Chris Rainey – (redshirt) Senior; 23 Mike Gillislee – Junior; 8 Trey Burton – Sophomore; 37 Ben Sams – Sophomore; 33 Mack Brown – (redshirt) Freshman; Fullbacks: 34 Jason Traylor – Senior; 41 Hunter Joyer – Freshman; 35 Jessie Schmitt – Sophomore; Wide receivers: 85 Frankie Hammond Jr. – (redshirt) Junior; 9 Quinton Dunbar – (redshirt) Freshman; 89 Stephen Alli – (redshirt) Sophomore; 30 Michael McNeely – Freshman; 82 Omarius Hines – (redshirt) Junior; 4 Andre Debose – (redshirt) Sophomore; 29 Solomon Schoonover – Senior; 7 Robert Clark – Sophomore; 83 Solomon Patton – Sophomore; 6 Deonte Thompson – (redshirt) Senior; 80 Ja'Juan Story – Freshman; 88 Matt Morrow – (redshirt) Freshman	Tight ends: 87 William Steinmann – Senior; 81 A.C. Leonard – Freshman; 11 Jordan Reed – (redshirt) Sophomore; 32 Gerald Christian – Sophomore; 88 Clay Burton – Freshman; Offensive line: 66 James Wilson – (redshirt) Senior; 62 Cole Gilliam – (redshirt) Sophomore; 67 Jon Halapio – (redshirt) Sophomore; 65 Tommy Jordan – Freshman; 63 Trip Thurman – Freshman; 78 David Young – Senior; 77 Ian Silberman – (redshirt) Freshman; 72 Jonotthan Harrison – (redshirt) Sophomore; 75 Chaz Green – (redshirt) Freshman; 64 Kyle Koehne – (redshirt) Sophomore; 73 Xavier Nixon – Junior; 71 Matt Patchan – (redshirt) Sophomore; 50 Sam Robey – (redshirt) Junior; 56 Dan Wenger – (redshirt) Senior; Defensive line: 2 Dominique Easley – Sophomore; 73 Sharrif Floyd – Sophomore; 96 William Green – Senior; 6 Jaye Howard – (redshirt) Senior; 99 Omar Hunter – (redshirt) Junior; 90 Evan Holmes – Freshman; 93 Kedric Johnson – (redshirt) Sophomore; 34 Lerentee McCray – (redshirt) Junior; 94 Gerry Marseille – Freshman; 91 Earl Okine – (redshirt) Junior; 44 Leon Orr – (redshirt) Freshman; 92 Lynden Trail – (redshirt) Freshman; 97 Tevin Westbrook – Freshman	Buck: 7 Ronald Powell – Sophomore; Linebackers: 25 Gideon Ajagbe – (redshirt) Freshman; 52 Jon Bostic – Junior; 13 Dee Finley – (redshirt) Sophomore; 3 Jelani Jenkins – (redshirt) Sophomore; 49 Darrin Kitchens – Sophomore; 33 Minch Minchin – Senior; 53 Scott Peek – (redshirt) Junior; 95 Hygens Succes – Junior; 51 Michael Taylor – (redshirt) Freshman; 55 Graham Stewart – Freshman; Cornerbacks: 31 Brian Biada – Senior; 8 Jeremy Brown – (redshirt) Sophomore; 36 Moses Jenkins – (redshirt) Senior; 15 Loucheiz Purifoy – Freshman; 31 Cody Riggs – Sophomore; 5 Marcus Roberson – Freshman; 37 Brandon Sanders – Sophomore; 45 Newton Lizima – Senior; Safeties: 30 Tim Clark – (redshirt) Sophomore; 22 Matt Elam – Sophomore; 24 Josh Evans – Junior; 21 Jabari Gorman – Freshman; 27 Ben Peacock – Freshman; 9 Joshua Shaw – (redshirt) Freshman; 20 Valdez Showers – Freshman; 14 Jaylen Watkins – Sophomore	Punters: 44 Kyle Christy – Freshman; 39 Todd Fennell – Freshman; 40 David Lerner – Senior; Placekickers: 98 Zack Brust – Senior; 47 John Crofoot – (redshirt) Sophomore; 97 Brad Phillips – Sophomore; 19 Caleb Sturgis – (redshirt) Junior; Long snappers: 43 Kyle Crofoot – Freshman; 46 Drew Ferris – Sophomore; 54 Christopher Guido – (redshirt) Sophomore; 50 Cody Hampton – Senior

=== Depth chart ===
Projected starters and primary backups versus Florida Atlantic.

Defense

FS
De'Ante Saunders
Josh Evans

WLB	MLB	SLB
⋅	Jon Bostic	⋅
Dee Finley	Michael Taylor	⋅

SS
Matt Elam
Joshua Shaw

CB
Jeremy Brown
Marcus Roberson

DE	DT	DT	DE
Ronald Powell	Dominique Easley	Jaye Howard	Sharrif Floyd
Kedric Johnson	Leon Orr	Omar Hunter	William Green

CB
Cody Riggs
Moses Jenkins

Offense

WR
Quinton Dunbar
Andre Debose

LT	LG	C	RG	RT
Xavier Nixon	Dan Wenger	Jonnotthan Harrison	Jon Halapio	Matt Patchan
Chaz Green	Kyle Koehne	Dan Wenger	Nick Alajajian	Chaz Green

TE
Jordan Reed
Gerald Christian

WR
Deonte Thompson
Frankie Hammond Jr.

QB
John Brantley
Jeff Driskel

RB
Chris Rainey
Jeffery Demps

FB
Trey Burton
Hunter Joyer

Special teams
PK Caleb Sturgis
P David Lerner
KR Andre Debose
PR Chris Rainey
LS Drew Ferris

== Players drafted into the NFL ==
Round	Pick	Player	Position	NFL Club
4	114	Jaye Howard	DT	Seattle Seahawks
5	159	Chris Rainey	RB	Pittsburgh Steelers
