= 2012 Florida Gators football team =

American college football season

2012 Florida Gators football

SEC Eastern Division co-champion

Sugar Bowl, L 23–33 vs. Louisville
- Conference: Southeastern Conference
- Eastern Division

Ranking
- Coaches: No. 10
- AP: No. 9
- Record: 11–2 (7–1 SEC)
- Head coach: Will Muschamp (2nd season)
- Offensive coordinator: Brent Pease (1st season)
- Offensive scheme: Multiple
- Defensive coordinator: Dan Quinn (2nd season)
- Base defense: Multiple 4–3
- Home stadium: Ben Hill Griffin Stadium

2012 Southeastern Conference football standings
	Conf.			Overall
Team	W		L	W		L
Eastern Division
No. T–5 Georgia xy	7	–	1	12	–	2
No. 9 Florida x%	7	–	1	11	–	2
No. 8 South Carolina	6	–	2	11	–	2
No. 23 Vanderbilt	5	–	3	9	–	4
Missouri	2	–	6	5	–	7
Tennessee	1	–	7	5	–	7
Kentucky	0	–	8	2	–	10
Western Division
No. 1 Alabama x$#	7	–	1	13	–	1
No. 14 LSU *	6	–	2	10	–	3
No. T–5 Texas A&M	6	–	2	11	–	2
Mississippi State	4	–	4	8	–	5
Ole Miss *	3	–	5	7	–	6
Arkansas	2	–	6	4	–	8
Auburn	0	–	8	3	–	9
Championship: Alabama 32, Georgia 28
# – BCS National Champion; $ – BCS representative as conference champion; % – BCS at-large representative; x – Division champion/co-champions; y – Championship game participant; * Ole Miss and LSU vacated all wins due to NCAA violations.; Rankings from AP Poll

The 2012 Florida Gators football team represented the University of Florida in the sport of American football during the 2012 college football season. The Gators competed in the Football Bowl Subdivision (FBS) of the National Collegiate Athletic Association (NCAA) and the Eastern Division of the Southeastern Conference (SEC), and played their home games at Ben Hill Griffin Stadium on the university's Gainesville, Florida campus. The 2012 season was the Gators' second under head coach Will Muschamp. They finished the season with 11–2 overall, 7–1 SEC. The team was invited to the 2013 Sugar Bowl, where they lost to the Louisville Cardinals, 33–23.

== Schedule ==
The 2012 Orange and Blue Debut game was played on April 7 at 1 p.m. and was televised on Sun Sports. Blue defeated Orange 21–20 in front of 38,100 fans.

The October 20 game against South Carolina hosted ESPN's College Gameday. In addition, their road games against Texas A&M and Tennessee were also hosted by College GameDay.

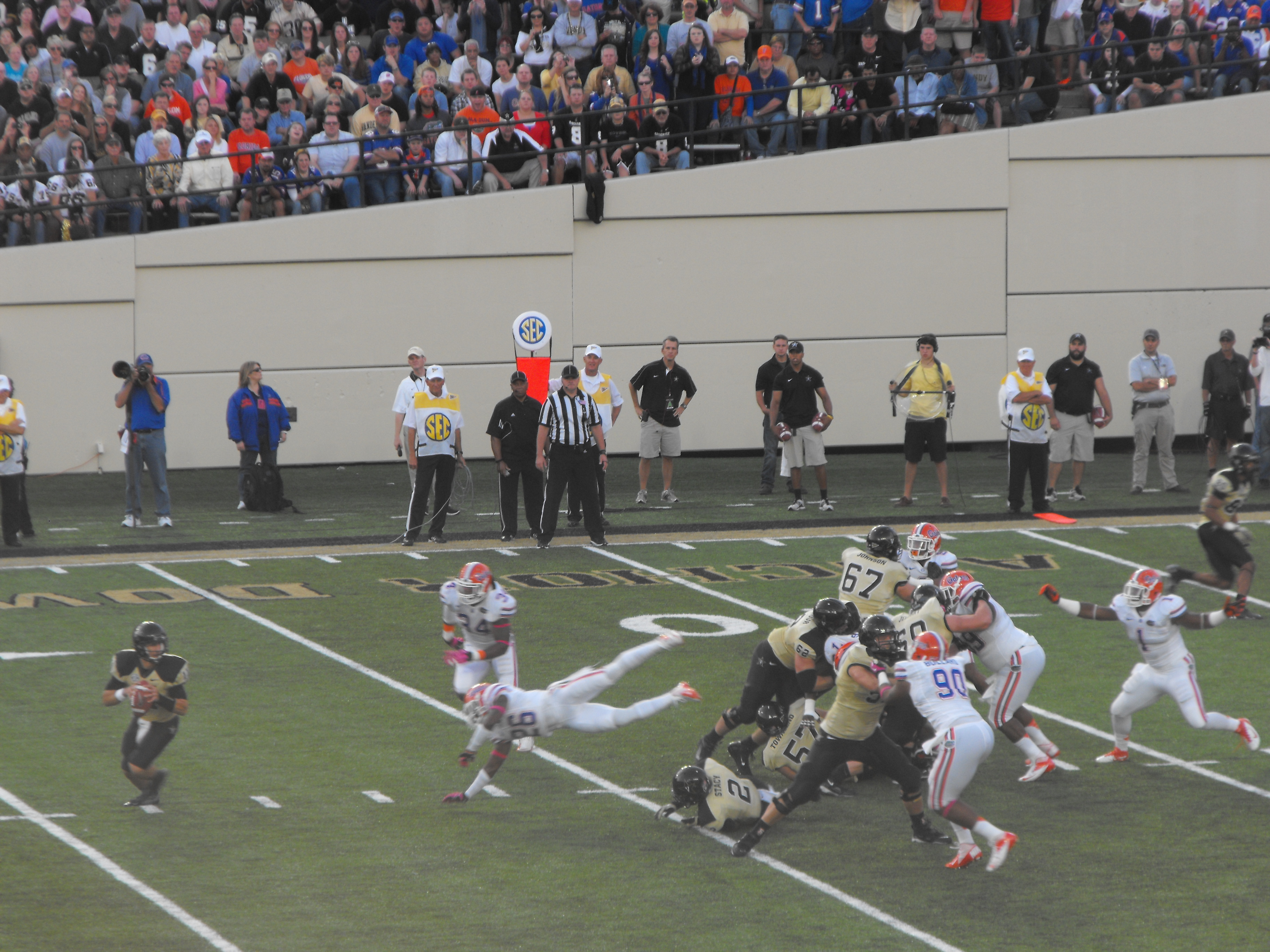
Image from Florida–Vanderbilt game.

Date	Opponent	Rank	Site	TV	Result	Attendance
September 1	Bowling Green*	No. 23	Ben Hill Griffin Stadium; Gainesville, FL	ESPN	W 27–14	84,704
September 8	at Texas A&M	No. 24	Kyle Field; College Station, TX (College GameDay)	ESPN	W 20–17	87,114
September 15	at No. 23 Tennessee	No. 18	Neyland Stadium; Knoxville, TN (College GameDay) (rivalry)	ESPN	W 37–20	102,455
September 22	Kentucky	No. 14	Ben Hill Griffin Stadium; Gainesville, FL (rivalry)	SECN	W 38–0	87,102
October 6	No. 4 LSU	No. 10	Ben Hill Griffin Stadium; Gainesville, FL (rivalry)	CBS	W 14–6	90,824
October 13	at Vanderbilt	No. 4	Vanderbilt Stadium; Nashville, TN	ESPNU	W 31–17	40,350
October 20	No. 9 South Carolina	No. 3	Ben Hill Griffin Stadium; Gainesville, FL (College GameDay)	CBS	W 44–11	90,833
October 27	vs. No. 12 Georgia	No. 3	EverBank Field; Jacksonville, FL (rivalry)	CBS	L 9–17	84,644
November 3	Missouri	No. 8	Ben Hill Griffin Stadium; Gainesville, FL	ESPN2	W 14–7	90,496
November 10	Louisiana–Lafayette*^{†}	No. 7	Ben Hill Griffin Stadium; Gainesville, FL	SECN	W 27–20	86,482
November 17	Jacksonville State*	No. 7	Ben Hill Griffin Stadium; Gainesville, FL	PPV	W 23–0	82,691
November 24	at No. 10 Florida State*	No. 6	Doak Campbell Stadium; Tallahassee, FL (rivalry)	ABC	W 37–26	83,429
January 2, 2013	vs. No. 22 Louisville*	No. 4	Superdome; New Orleans, LA (Sugar Bowl) (College GameDay)	ESPN	L 23–33	54,178
*Non-conference game; ^{†}Homecoming; Rankings from AP Poll released before game time

== Rankings ==
Ranking movements Legend: ██ Increase in ranking ██ Decrease in ranking ( ) = First-place votes
	Week															
Poll	Pre	1	2	3	4	5	6	7	8	9	10	11	12	13	14	Final
AP	23	24	18	14	11	10	4	3	3 (1)	8	7	7	6	5	4	9
Coaches	23	23	17	14	12	11	6	4	3	8	7	7	6	5	4	10
Harris	Not released						6	3	3 (1)	8	7	7	5	5	4	Not released
BCS	Not released							2	2	7	6	6	4	4	3	Not released

== Roster ==
2012 Florida Gators roster
Quarterbacks: 6 Jeff Driskel – sophomore; 9 Jacob Guy – freshman; 10 Tyler Murphy – (redshirt) sophomore; 12 Jacoby Brissett – sophomore; 13 Christian Provancha – sophomore; 17 Skyler Mornhinweg – freshman; 19 Ryan McGriff – (redshirt) freshman; Running backs: 16 Scott Peek – (redshirt) senior; 23 Mike Gillislee – senior; 24 Matt Jones – freshman; 32 Chris Johnson – sophomore; 33 Mack Brown – (redshirt) sophomore; 35 Jessie Schmitt – (redshirt) freshman; 37 Mark Herndon – freshman; 41 Hunter Joyer – sophomore; Wide receivers: 1 Quinton Dunbar – (redshirt) sophomore; 4 Eric Rumph – (redshirt) junior; 8 Trey Burton – junior; 13 Latroy Pittman – freshman; 15 Ryan Parrish – junior; 30 Michael McNeely – sophomore; 33 Chris Maignan – (redshirt) junior; 81 Darius Masline – freshman; 83 Solomon Patton – junior; 85 Frankie Hammond – (redshirt) senior; 86 Raphael Andrades – freshman; 87 A. J. Mobley – (redshirt) sophomore; 89 Stephen Alli – (redshirt) junior; Tight ends: 11 Jordan Reed – (redshirt) junior; 18 Kent Taylor – freshman; 20 Omarius Hines – (redshirt) senior; 80 Tevin Westbrook – sophomore; 82 Bair Diamond – freshman; 84 Colin Thompson – freshman; 88 Clay Burton – sophomore	Offensive line: 50 Sam Robey – (redshirt) senior; 62 Cole Gilliam – (redshirt) junior; 63 Trip Thurman – (redshirt) freshman; 64 Kyle Koehne – (redshirt) junior; 65 Tommy Jordan – (redshirt) freshman; 66 James Wilson – (redshirt) senior; 67 Jon Halapio – (redshirt) junior; 68 John Reichardt – senior; 70 D. J. Humphries – freshman; 71 Matt Patchan – (redshirt) junior; 72 Jonotthan Harrison – (redshirt) junior; 73 Xavier Nixon – senior; 74 Jessamen Dunker – freshman; 75 Chaz Green – (redshirt) sophomore; 76 Max Garcia – Incoming Transfer; 77 Ian Silberman – (redshirt) sophomore; Defensive line: 2 Dominique Easley – junior; 4 Damien Jacobs – junior; 6 Dante Fowler – freshman; 7 Ronald Powell – junior; 44 Leon Orr – (redshirt) sophomore; 57 Dakota Wilson – freshman; 58 Nick Alajajian – senior; 68 John Reichardt – (redshirt) junior; 73 Sharrif Floyd – junior; 90 Jonathan Bullard – freshman; 91 Earl Okine – (redshirt) senior; 93 Kedric Johnson – (redshirt) junior; 94 Bryan Cox Jr. – freshman; 95 Alex McCallister – freshman; 98 Quinteze Williams – freshman; 99 Omar Hunter – (redshirt) senior	Linebackers: 1 Jon Bostic – senior; 3 Jelani Jenkins – (redshirt) junior; 11 Neiron Ball – (redshirt) sophomore; 12 Antonio Morrison – freshman; 25 Gideon Ajagbe – (redshirt) sophomore; 28 Jeremi Powell – freshman; 34 Lerentee McCray – (redshirt) senior; 36 David Campbell – (redshirt) junior; 48 Wes Owings – freshman; 49 Darrin Kitchens – junior; 51 Michael Taylor – (redshirt) sophomore; 53 Cody Adams – (redshirt) freshman; Cornerbacks: 5 Marcus Roberson – sophomore; 8 Jeremy Brown – (redshirt) junior; 14 Jaylen Watkins – junior; 15 Loucheiz Purifoy – sophomore; 22 Hugh Miles – (redshirt) freshman; 24 Brian Poole – freshman; 27 Willie Bailey – freshman; 31 Cody Riggs – junior; Safeties: 9 Josh Evans – senior; 10 Valdez Showers – (redshirt) freshman; 20 Marcus Maye – freshman; 21 Jabari Gorman – sophomore; 21 Evan Schroeder – (redshirt) freshman; 22 Matt Elam – junior; 26 De'Ante Saunders – sophomore; 27 Ben Peacock – (redshirt) freshman; 29 Rhaheim Ledbetter – freshman; 30 Tim Clark – (redshirt) junior	Punters: 0 Grant Van Aman – freshman; 4 Kyle Christy – sophomore; 39 Todd Fennell – (redshirt) freshman; 40 Justin Vogel – freshman; Kickers: 16 Austin Hardin – freshman; 19 Caleb Sturgis – (redshirt) senior; 47 John Crofoot – (redshirt) junior; 95 Francisco Velez – junior; 97 Brad Phillips – junior; Long snappers: 43 Kyle Crofoot – (redshirt) freshman; 46 Drew Ferris – junior; 54 Christopher Guido – senior

== Coaching staff ==
- Wide receivers coach Aubrey Hill resigned during the offseason, so Pease and graduate assistant Bush Hamdan coached wide receivers.

Name	Current responsibilities	Joined staff
Will Muschamp	Head coach	2011
Brent Pease	Offensive coordinator/quarterbacks*	2012
Dan Quinn	Defensive coordinator	2011
D.J. Durkin	Linebackers/Special Teams	2010
Tim Davis	offensive line/Running game coordinator	2012
Brian White	Running Backs	2009
Derek Lewis	Tight Ends	2011
Travaris Robinson	Defensive Backs	2011
Bryant Young	Defensive line	2011

== Recruiting class ==
College recruiting
Name	Hometown	School	Height	Weight	Commit date
Raphael Andrades; WR	Tallahassee, Florida	Lincoln	6 ft 1 in (1.85 m)	180 lb (82 kg)	Feb 1, 2012
Raphael Andrades; WR	Recruit ratings: Scout: Rivals: 247Sports: ESPN:				
Willie Bailey; CB	Hallandale, Florida	Hallandale	6 ft 1 in (1.85 m)	165 lb (75 kg)	Apr 6, 2011
Willie Bailey; CB	Recruit ratings: Scout: Rivals: 247Sports: ESPN:				
Jonathan Bullard; DE	Shelby, North Carolina	Crest	6 ft 4 in (1.93 m)	255 lb (116 kg)	Jan 7, 2012
Jonathan Bullard; DE	Recruit ratings: Scout: Rivals: 247Sports: ESPN:				
Bryan Cox Jr. DE	Fort Lauderdale, Florida	St. Thomas Aquinas	6 ft 3 in (1.91 m)	230 lb (100 kg)	Jan 21, 2012
Bryan Cox Jr. DE	Recruit ratings: Scout: Rivals: 247Sports: ESPN:				
Jessamen Dunker; OL	Boynton Beach, Florida	Boynton Beach	6 ft 6 in (1.98 m)	315 lb (143 kg)	Mar 21, 2011
Jessamen Dunker; OL	Recruit ratings: Scout: Rivals: 247Sports: ESPN:				
Dante Fowler; DE	St. Petersburg, Florida	Lakewood	6 ft 3 in (1.91 m)	235 lb (107 kg)	Feb 1, 2012
Dante Fowler; DE	Recruit ratings: Scout: Rivals: 247Sports: ESPN:				
Austin Hardin; K	Atlanta, Georgia	Marist Brothers	5 ft 11 in (1.80 m)	200 lb (91 kg)	Jun 22, 2011
Austin Hardin; K	Recruit ratings: Scout: Rivals: 247Sports: ESPN:				
D.J. Humphries; OL	Charlotte, North Carolina	Mallard Creek	6 ft 6 in (1.98 m)	270 lb (120 kg)	Aug 5, 2011
D.J. Humphries; OL	Recruit ratings: Scout: Rivals: 247Sports: ESPN:				
Damien Jacobs; DT	Scooba, Mississippi	East Mississippi C.C.	6 ft 3 in (1.91 m)	295 lb (134 kg)	Dec 21, 2011
Damien Jacobs; DT	Recruit ratings: Scout: Rivals: 247Sports: ESPN:				
Matt Jones; RB	Seffner, Florida	Armwood	6 ft 3 in (1.91 m)	220 lb (100 kg)	Feb 15, 2011
Matt Jones; RB	Recruit ratings: Scout: Rivals: 247Sports: ESPN:				
Rhaheim Ledbetter; S	Boiling Springs, North Carolina	Crest	5 ft 11 in (1.80 m)	190 lb (86 kg)	Jul 15, 2011
Rhaheim Ledbetter; S	Recruit ratings: Scout: Rivals: 247Sports: ESPN:				
Jafar Mann; DT	Stone Mountain, Georgia	Stephenson	6 ft 4 in (1.93 m)	275 lb (125 kg)	Mar 25, 2011
Jafar Mann; DT	Recruit ratings: Scout: Rivals: 247Sports: ESPN:				
Marcus Maye; S	Melbourne, Florida	Holy Trinity	6 ft 1 in (1.85 m)	195 lb (88 kg)	Jul 18, 2011
Marcus Maye; S	Recruit ratings: Scout: Rivals: 247Sports: ESPN:				
Alex McCalister; DE	Clemmons, North Carolina	West Forsyth	6 ft 6 in (1.98 m)	220 lb (100 kg)	Jan 23, 2012
Alex McCalister; DE	Recruit ratings: Scout: Rivals: 247Sports: ESPN:				
Skyler Mornhinweg; QB	Philadelphia, Pennsylvania	St. Joseph's	6 ft 3 in (1.91 m)	215 lb (98 kg)	Jan 27, 2012
Skyler Mornhinweg; QB	Recruit ratings: Scout: Rivals: 247Sports: ESPN:				
Antonio Morrison; LB	Bolingbrook, Illinois	Bolingbrook	6 ft 3 in (1.91 m)	220 lb (100 kg)	Aug 3, 2011
Antonio Morrison; LB	Recruit ratings: Scout: Rivals: 247Sports: ESPN:				
Latroy Pittman; WR	Citra, Florida	North Marion	6 ft 1 in (1.85 m)	190 lb (86 kg)	Aug 18, 2010
Latroy Pittman; WR	Recruit ratings: Scout: Rivals: 247Sports: ESPN:				
Brian Poole; CB	Bradenton, Florida	Southeast	5 ft 11 in (1.80 m)	185 lb (84 kg)	Jun 14, 2011
Brian Poole; CB	Recruit ratings: Scout: Rivals: 247Sports: ESPN:				
Jeremi Powell; MLB	Largo, Florida	Pinellas Park	6 ft 2 in (1.88 m)	200 lb (91 kg)	Feb 19, 2011
Jeremi Powell; MLB	Recruit ratings: Scout: Rivals: 247Sports: ESPN:				
Kent Taylor; TE	Land O' Lakes, Florida	Land O' Lakes	6 ft 5 in (1.96 m)	220 lb (100 kg)	Oct 27, 2011
Kent Taylor; TE	Recruit ratings: Scout: Rivals: 247Sports: ESPN:				
Colin Thompson; TE	Warminster, Pennsylvania	Archbishop Wood Catholic	6 ft 5 in (1.96 m)	255 lb (116 kg)	May 5, 2011
Colin Thompson; TE	Recruit ratings: Scout: Rivals: 247Sports: ESPN:				
Quinteze Williams; DE	Tyrone, Georgia	Sandy Creek	6 ft 4 in (1.93 m)	290 lb (130 kg)	Mar 30, 2011
Quinteze Williams; DE	Recruit ratings: Scout: Rivals: 247Sports: ESPN:				
Overall recruit ranking: Scout: 5 Rivals: 3 247Sports: 4 ESPN: 4
Note: In many cases, Scout, Rivals, 247Sports, On3, and ESPN may conflict in their listings of height and weight.; In these cases, the average was taken. ESPN grades are on a 100-point scale.; Sources: "2012 Team Ranking". Rivals.com.

== Season summary ==
=== Bowling Green ===
Team	1	2	3	4	Total
Bowling Green	7	0	7	0	14
• Florida	0	14	3	10	27

- Date: September 1
- Location: Ben Hill Griffin Stadium

=== Texas A&M ===
Team	1	2	3	4	Total
• Florida	7	3	3	7	20
Texas A&M	3	14	0	0	17

- Date: September 8
- Location: Kyle Field

=== Tennessee ===
Team	1	2	3	4	Total
• Florida	7	3	17	10	37
Tennessee	7	7	6	0	20

- Date: September 15
- Location: Neyland Stadium

=== Kentucky ===
Team	1	2	3	4	Total
Kentucky	0	0	0	0	0
• Florida	3	21	7	7	38

- Date: September 22
- Location: Ben Hill Griffin Stadium

=== LSU ===
Team	1	2	3	4	Total
LSU	3	3	0	0	6
• Florida	0	0	7	7	14

- Date: October 6
- Location: Ben Hill Griffin Stadium

=== Vanderbilt ===
Team	1	2	3	4	Total
• Florida	0	11	7	13	31
Vanderbilt	7	0	0	10	17

- Date: October 13
- Location: Vanderbilt Stadium

=== South Carolina ===
Team	1	2	3	4	Total
South Carolina	3	3	2	3	11
• Florida	7	14	16	7	44

- Date: October 20
- Location: Ben Hill Griffin Stadium

=== Georgia ===
Team	1	2	3	4	Total
Florida	0	6	0	3	9
• Georgia	7	0	3	7	17

- Date: October 27
- Location: Everbank Field

=== Missouri ===
Team	1	2	3	4	Total
Missouri	0	7	0	0	7
• Florida	0	0	7	7	14

- Date: November 3
- Location: Ben Hill Griffin Stadium

=== Louisiana-Lafayette ===
Team	1	2	3	4	Total
Louisiana	3	0	14	3	20
• Florida	3	7	3	14	27

- Date: November 10
- Location: Ben Hill Griffin Stadium

=== Jacksonville State ===
Team	1	2	3	4	Total
Jacksonville St	0	0	0	0	0
• Florida	10	0	7	6	23

- Date: November 17
- Location: Ben Hill Griffin Stadium

=== Florida State ===
#6 Florida Gators (10–1) at #10 Florida State Seminoles (10–1)

Quarter	1	2	3	4	Total
Florida	3	10	0	24	37
Florida State	0	3	17	6	26

at Doak Campbell Stadium • Tallahassee, Florida

- Date: November 24
- Game time: 3:30 p.m. EDT
- Game weather: Sunny • 66 °F (19 °C) • Wind N/NW 10 miles per hour (16 km/h; 8.7 kn)
- Game attendance: 83,429
- Referee: Brad Allen
- Automated ScoreBook

Game information

Florida

- Jeff Driskel
  15/23, 147 Yds, TD
- Mike Gillislee
  24 Rush, 140 Yds, 2 TD
- Jordan Reed
  4 Rec, 54 Yds

Florida State

- EJ Manuel
  18/33, 182 Yds, TD, 3 INT
  12 Rush, 54 Yds, 2 TD
- Rashad Greene
  5 Rec, 65 Yds

Scoring summary

Quarter	Time	Drive			Team	Scoring information	Score	
Quarter	Time	Plays	Yards	TOP	Team	Scoring information	FLA	FSU
1	9:13	14	54	5:47	Florida	39-yard field goal by Caleb Sturgis	3	0
2	6:53	10	54	4:59	Florida	45-yard field goal by Caleb Sturgis	6	0
2	5:26	3	21	1:20	Florida	Mike Gillislee 9-yard touchdown run, Caleb Sturgis kick good	13	0
2	0:00	9	56	2:10	Florida State	50-yard field goal by Dustin Hopkins	13	3
3	10:27	4	25	1:06	Florida State	Nick O'Leary 6-yard touchdown reception from EJ Manuel, Dustin Hopkins kick good	13	10
3	8:30	2	26	1:49	Florida State	EJ Manuel 1-yard touchdown run, Dustin Hopkins kick good	13	17
3	4:24	4	13	1:15	Florida State	53-yard field goal by Dustin Hopkins	13	20
4	13:27	13	64	5:53	Florida	32-yard field goal by Caleb Sturgis	16	20
4	11:01	1	37	0:08	Florida	Mike Gillislee 37-yard touchdown run, Caleb Sturgis kick good	23	20
4	7:00	5	32	2:23	Florida	Quinton Dunbar 14-yard touchdown reception from Jeff Driskel, Caleb Sturgis kick good	30	20
4	2:33	4	56	1:25	Florida	Matt Jones 32-yard touchdown run, Caleb Sturgis kick good	37	20
4	0:00	11	77	2:28	Florida State	EJ Manuel 22-yard touchdown run	37	26
"TOP" = time of possession. For other American football terms, see Glossary of American football.							37	26

=== Sugar Bowl ===
Team	1	2	3	4	Total
• Louisville	14	10	6	3	33
Florida	0	10	0	13	23

- Date: January 2
- Location: Mercedes-Benz Superdome
- Game weather: Indoors (dome)

== Players drafted into the NFL ==
Round	Pick	Player	Position	NFL club
1	23	Sharrif Floyd	DT	Minnesota Vikings
1	32	Matt Elam	S	Baltimore Ravens
2	50	Jon Bostic	LB	Chicago Bears
3	85	Jordan Reed	TE	Washington Redskins
4	104	Jelani Jenkins	LB	Miami Dolphins
5	164	Mike Gillislee	RB	Miami Dolphins
5	166	Caleb Sturgis	K	Miami Dolphins
6	169	Josh Evans	S	Jacksonville Jaguars
