= Jaye Howard =

American football player (born 1988)

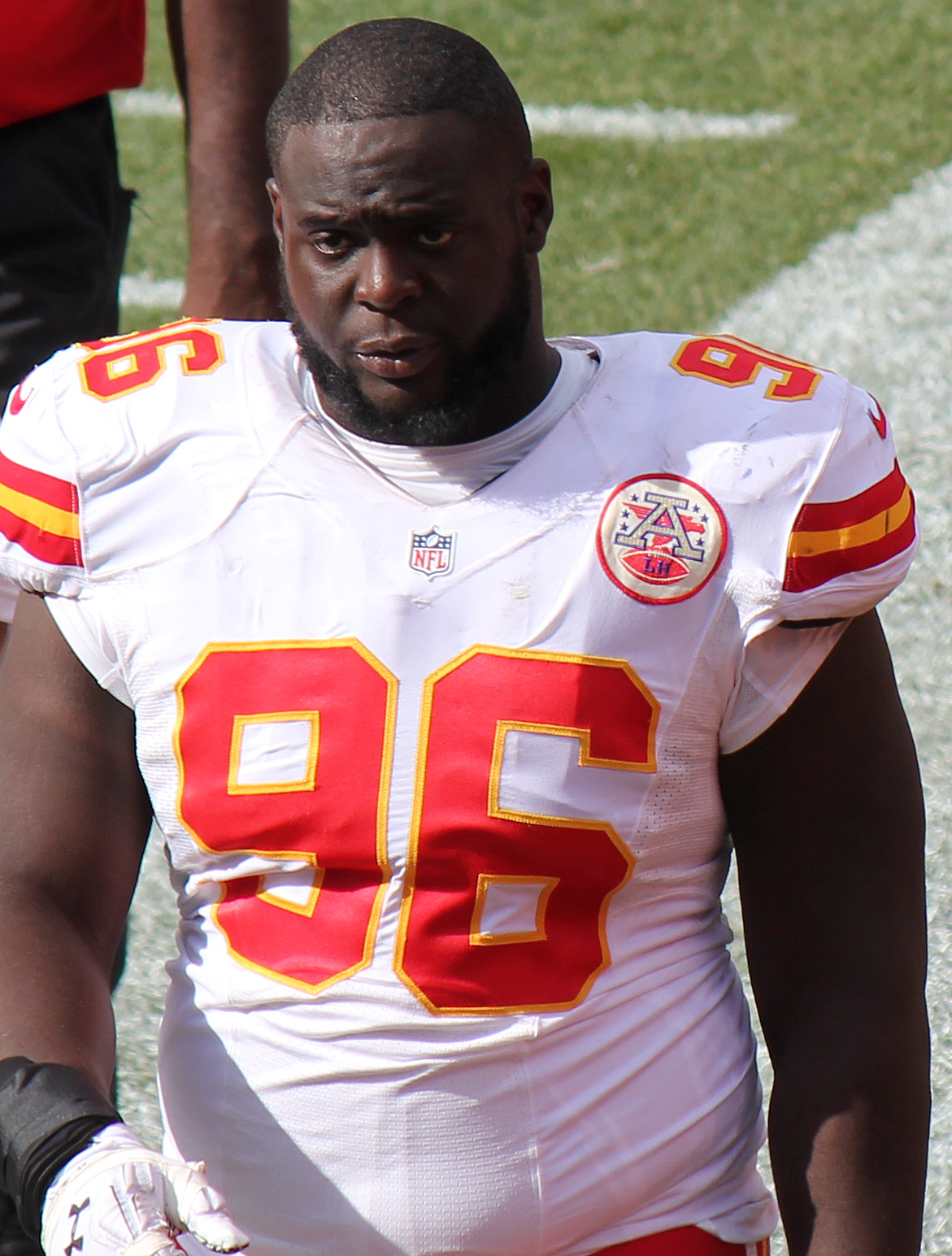
- Howard with the Kansas City Chiefs in 2014

No. 94, 96
- Position: Defensive end

Personal information
- Born: December 20, 1988 (age 37); Zachary, Louisiana, U.S.
- Listed height: 6 ft 3 in (1.91 m)
- Listed weight: 301 lb (137 kg)

Career information
- High school: Jones (Orlando, Florida)
- College: Florida
- NFL draft: 2012: 4th round, 114th overall pick

Career history
- Seattle Seahawks (2012); Kansas City Chiefs (2013–2016); Chicago Bears (2017)*
- * Offseason or practice squad member only

Awards and highlights
- BCS national champion (2009)

Career NFL statistics
- Total tackles: 122
- Sacks: 7.5
- Forced fumbles: 1
- Fumble recoveries: 2
- Stats at Pro Football Reference

Jaye Howard Jr. (born December 20, 1988) is an American former professional football player who was a defensive end in the National Football League (NFL). He played college football for the Florida Gators, winning a BCS National Championship with the team. He was selected by the Seattle Seahawks in the fourth round of the 2012 NFL draft.

== College career ==
While attending the University of Florida on an athletic scholarship, Howard played for coach Urban Meyer and coach Will Muschamp's Gators teams from 2008 to 2011. The coaching staff red-shirted him as true freshman in 2007, and played in nine games in 2008. As a redshirt sophomore in 2009, Howard played in twelve games during the Gators' undefeated regular season. During his 2010 junior year, he appeared in eleven games, starting eight of them, but missing the rest with an ankle injury. As a senior in 2011, Howard started all thirteen games and memorably scored a touchdown on a fumble recovery against the Kentucky Wildcats. He finished his four-year Gators career with 131 tackles and 25.5 for a loss.

== Professional career ==
Pre-draft measurables
Height	Weight	Arm length	Hand span	40-yard dash	10-yard split	20-yard split	20-yard shuttle	Three-cone drill	Vertical jump	Broad jump	Bench press
6 ft 3 in (1.91 m)	301 lb (137 kg)	33 in (0.84 m)	9 7/8 in (0.25 m)	4.82 s	1.68 s	2.83 s	4.47 s	7.32 s	27.5 in (0.70 m)	8 ft 10 in (2.69 m)	24 reps
All values from NFL Combine

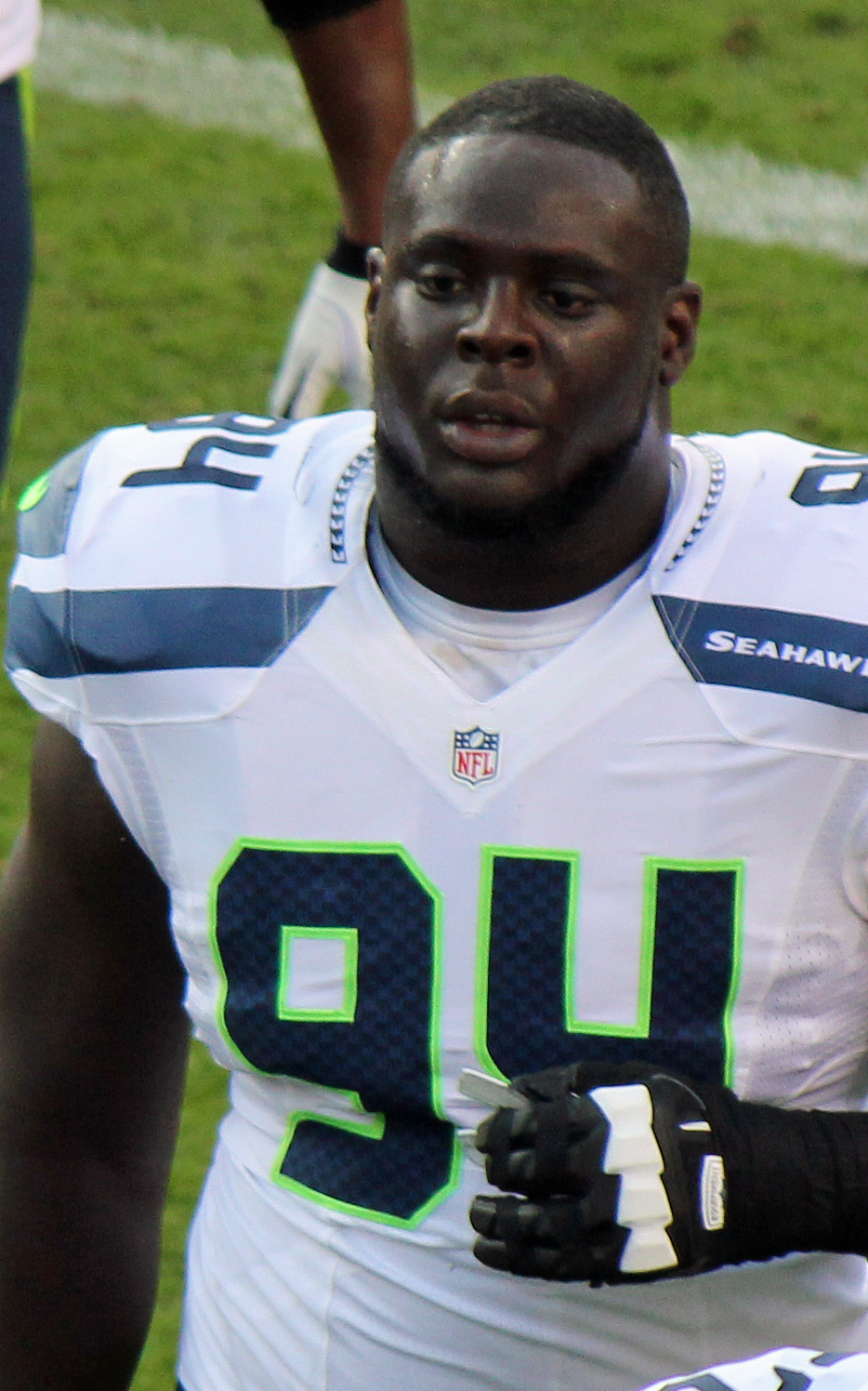
Howard in the 2012 preseason while with the Seahawks.

=== Seattle Seahawks ===
The Seattle Seahawks selected Howard in the fourth round, with the 114th overall pick in the 2012 NFL draft. He was released by the Seahawks on August 31, 2013.

=== Kansas City Chiefs ===
Howard was claimed off waivers by the Chiefs on September 1, 2013.

On March 9, 2016, Howard signed a two-year $12 million deal to stay with the Chiefs through 2017. He was placed on injured reserve on December 1, 2016, with a hip injury.

On April 22, 2017, Howard was released by the Chiefs.

=== Chicago Bears ===
On May 4, 2017, Howard signed a one-year contract with the Chicago Bears . He was released on September 2, 2017.

=== NFL statistics ===
Year	Team	GP	COMB	TOT	AST	SCK	FF	FR	FY YDs	PD
2013	KC	3	6	5	1	0.0	0	0	0	0
2014	KC	16	36	24	12	1.0	0	0	0	1
2015	KC	16	57	36	21	5.5	1	2	-1	0
2016	KC	8	23	18	5	1.0	0	0	0	0
Career		45	122	83	39	7.5	1	2	-1	1

== See also ==
- List of Florida Gators in the NFL draft
