= Sharrif Floyd =

American football player (born 1991)

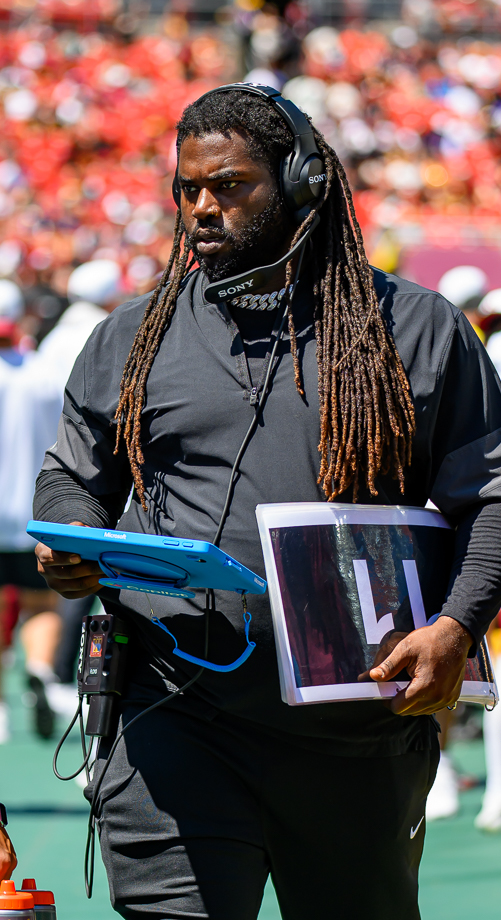
- Floyd with the Washington Commanders in 2025

Georgetown Hoyas
- Title: Defensive line coach

Personal information
- Born: May 28, 1991 (age 35); Philadelphia, Pennsylvania, U.S.
- Listed height: 6 ft 3 in (1.91 m)
- Listed weight: 311 lb (141 kg)

Career information
- Position: Defensive tackle (No. 73)
- High school: George Washington (Philadelphia)
- College: Florida (2010–2012)
- NFL draft: 2013: 1st round, 23rd overall pick

Career history

Playing
- Minnesota Vikings (2013–2017)

Coaching
- Benjamin Franklin HS (2019–2020) Defensive coordinator; Florida Gators (2021–2022) Undergraduate assistant; Dallas Cowboys (2023) Assistant defensive line/defensive quality control coach; Washington Commanders (2024–2025) Assistant defensive line coach; Georgetown Hoyas (2026–present) Defensive line coach

Awards and highlights
- First-team All-American (2012); First-team All-SEC (2012)

Career NFL statistics
- Tackles: 95
- Sacks: 9.5
- Forced fumbles: 1
- Stats at Pro Football Reference

Sharrif Kalil Floyd (born May 28, 1991) is an American professional football coach and former defensive tackle who is the defensive line coach for the Georgetown Hoyas. He played college football for the Florida Gators, earning All-American honors in 2012. Floyd was selected by the Minnesota Vikings in the first round of the 2013 NFL draft and retired in 2017 following a number of injuries. He became a coach in 2019.

== Early life ==
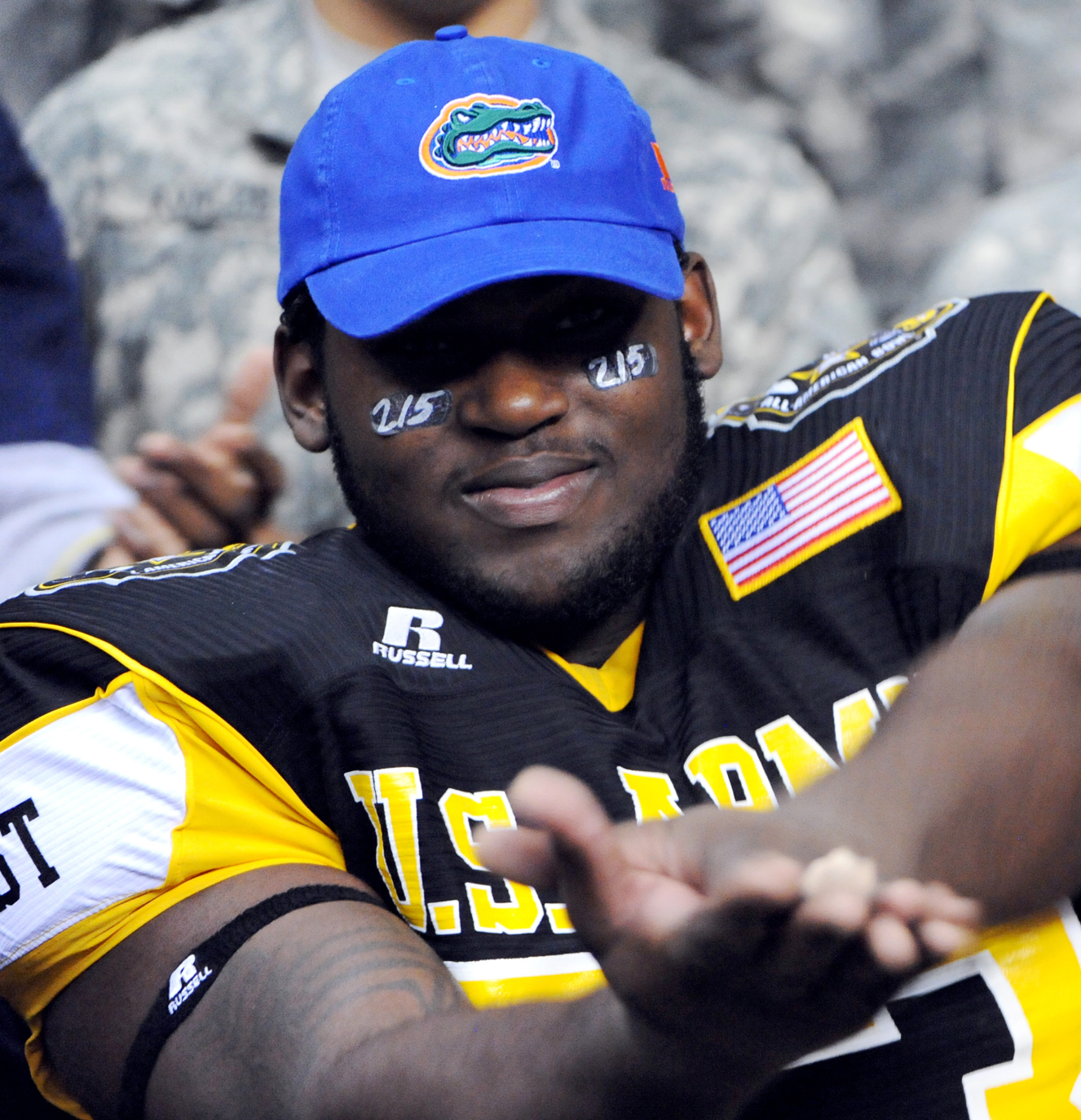
Floyd at the 2010 All-American Bowl.

Floyd was born on May 28, 1991, in Philadelphia, Pennsylvania. He attended George Washington High School in Philadelphia, where he started varsity football for 3 of his 4 years at Washington, under head coach Ron Cohen. He totaled over 60 tackles, 6 sacks and I 43 tackles for losses during his junior season while tearing his ACL during a semifinal playoff game. He received an invitation to the annual U.S. Army National Combine in January 2009, but initially could not afford the travel costs to San Antonio, Texas. With help from special-education students and counselor, Dawn Seeger, Floyd baked brownies and sold them at school for weeks to raise the money. He was able to make the trip and earned first-team all-combine honors.Becoming the #1 ranked offensive lineman of his class. After his senior season at Washington High School, he was named a high school All-American by USA Today, Parade magazine, and EA Sports. He ended his high school career at the 2010 U.S. Army All-American Bowl. Regarded as a five-star recruit by Rivals.com, Floyd was listed as the top defensive tackle prospect of the 2010 class. He chose Florida over eight other major Division I FBS college football programs, including Miami, Ohio State and USC.

College recruiting
Name	Hometown	School	Height	Weight	40^{‡}	Commit date
Sharrif Floyd; Defensive tackle	Philadelphia, Pennsylvania	George Washington High School	6 ft 3 in (1.91 m)	310 lb (140 kg)	4.8	Jan 9, 2010
Sharrif Floyd; Defensive tackle	Recruit ratings: Scout: Rivals:					
Overall recruit ranking: Scout: 1 (DT) Rivals: 1 (DT); 1 (PA)
‡ Refers to 40-yard dash; Note: In many cases, Scout, Rivals, 247Sports, On3, and ESPN may conflict in their listings of height, weight and 40 time.; In these cases, the average was taken. ESPN grades are on a 100-point scale.; Sources: "2010 Florida Football Commitment List". Rivals.; "2010 Florida College Football Team Recruiting Prospects". Scout.; "Scout.com Team Recruiting Rankings". Scout.; "2010 Team Ranking". Rivals.com.

== College career ==
Floyd accepted an athletic scholarship to attend the University of Florida, where he played for coach Urban Meyer and coach Will Muschamp's Florida Gators football teams from 2010 to 2012. Arriving in Gainesville as the highest-rated football recruit since wide receiver Percy Harvin in 2006, Floyd was one of seven true freshmen to make a start for the Florida Gators in 2010. After three seasons for the Gators, Floyd totalled 115 tackles (26 of them for loss), 4.5 sacks, one forced fumble, one pass defended and blocked three field goals.

=== Freshman season ===
As a freshman in 2010, Floyd earned a starting spot and contributed with two tackles, including one for loss, in the Gators' win over Penn State in the 2011 Outback Bowl. For the season, he had 23 tackles (13 assisted and 10 solo) with 6.5 of them for loss.

=== Sophomore season ===
As a sophomore in 2011, Floyd started the final 11 games of the season at defensive end, and totaled 46 tackles, including 6.5 tackles for a loss, 1.5 quarterback sacks, a pass breakup and a blocked kick. He also tied for the team lead with four quarterback hurries. He registered his first career sack in the 2012 Gator Bowl against Ohio State, and followed it with an assisted sack on the very next play for a total loss of five yards.

=== Junior season ===
During his 2012 junior season, Floyd moved back to his natural defensive tackle position, and had 31 tackles (including 19 solo). He also had a team-high 8.5 tackles for a loss, and was second with four quarterback hurries. After the season, he was recognized as first-team All-American by The Sporting News and received third-team honors from the Associated Press. He was also a first-team All-Southeastern Conference selection.

After Florida's loss in the 2013 Sugar Bowl, Floyd announced his decision to forgo his final year of college eligibility and enter the NFL Draft.

== Professional playing career ==
As of late January 2013, Floyd was projected to be a late-first round selection, and the fourth defensive tackle off the board, according to Sports Illustrated. After the combine, SI moved Floyd up to the No. 3 selection overall, and No. 1 among defensive tackles. In early April, CBSSports.com's Pete Prisco projected Floyd to go second overall, calling him "the best player in this draft". Floyd was listed as a defensive tackle, but was considered to be best fit as a defensive end in a 3–4 defensive alignment.

External videos
- Floyd's NFL Combine workout
- Floyd gets drafted by Minnesota

Pre-draft measurables
Height	Weight	Arm length	Hand span	40-yard dash	10-yard split	20-yard split	20-yard shuttle	Three-cone drill	Vertical jump	Broad jump
6 ft 2 5/8 in (1.90 m)	297 lb (135 kg)	31 3/4 in (0.81 m)	10 1/8 in (0.26 m)	4.92 s	1.70 s	2.80 s	4.75 s	7.40 s	30 in (0.76 m)	8 ft 10 in (2.69 m)
All values from NFL Combine

Floyd was chosen by the Minnesota Vikings in the first round (23rd overall pick) of the 2013 NFL draft, becoming the first defensive tackle selected by the Vikings in the 1st round since 2003 when the team drafted Kevin Williams ninth overall. He was also the first of three players drafted by the Vikings in the first round, marking only the second time in team history the team had three picks in the first round and the first time for an NFL team since the Rams in 2001. He signed a four-year, $8,076,200 contract with the Vikings, including a $4,253,600 signing bonus, $6,569,900 guaranteed, and an average annual salary of $2,019,050. On September 29, Floyd recorded the first sack of his career when he and Jared Allen combined to sack Pittsburgh's Ben Roethlisberger during the NFL International Series in London. He ended his rookie season with 19 combined tackles, 2.5 sacks, one forced fumble, and two pass deflections.

He switched his jersey to #73 for the 2014 season, going back to his high school and college number after wearing #95 for his rookie season. In 2014, Floyd finished the season with the most quarterback hurries among Vikings defensive tackles with 20, per Pro Football Focus, despite playing just 587 snaps. He recorded 42 total tackles, 4.5 sacks and one pass deflection.

Floyd was a starting defensive tackle next to Linval Joseph in the 2015 season. Floyd recorded a half a sack in Week 3 against the San Diego Chargers, and half a sack in Week 6 against the Kansas City Chiefs. He did not play in Week 7 against the Detroit Lions due to a knee/ankle injury. He was still hampered by the injury and was listed inactive for the Week 8 match-up against the Chicago Bears.

On May 2, 2016, the Vikings announced that they picked up the fifth-year option of Floyd's contract. Floyd only played in the first game of the season before being inactive for the next 12 games dealing with a knee injury. He was placed on injured reserve on December 12, 2016.

On March 30, 2017, it was revealed that Floyd was diagnosed with nerve damage in his knee following meniscus surgery in September 2016. With the lingering nerve damage, some projected that it could be career threatening. He was placed on the reserve/non-football injury list on September 2, 2017.

In November 2018, Floyd filed a $180 million medical malpractice lawsuit against Dr. James Andrews for causing him debilitating muscle and nerve damage after performing an unpermitted knee surgery on him in September 2016.

== Career statistics ==
College
Statistics				Tackles					Interceptions						Fumbles		
Season	GP	GS	Total	Solo	Ast	Sck	Tfl	PDef	Int	Yds	Avg	Lng	TDs	FF	FR	FR YDS	TDs
2010	11	3	23	10	13	0	6.5	0	0	0	0	0	0	0	0	0	0
2011	13	11	46	19	27	1.5	6.5	1	0	0	0	0	0	0	0	0	0
2012	13	13	46	29	17	3	13	0	0	0	0	0	0	1	0	0	0
Totals	37	25	115	58	57	4.5	26	1	0	0	0	0	0	1	0	0	0

NFL
Statistics				Tackles					Interceptions						Fumbles		
Season	GP	GS	Total	Solo	Ast	Sck	Sfty	PDef	Int	Yds	Avg	Lng	TDs	FF	FR	FR YDS	TDs
2013	16	1	19	9	10	2.5	--	2	0	0	0	0	0	1	0	0	0
2014	14	11	42	29	13	4.5	--	1	0	0	0	0	0	0	0	0	0
2015	13	12	34	19	15	2.5	--	1	0	0	0	0	0	0	0	0	0
2016	1	0	0	0	0	0	--	0	0	0	0	0	0	0	0	0	0
Totals	44	24	95	57	38	9.5	--	4	0	0	--	0	0	1	0	0	0

== Coaching career ==
After Floyd retired from playing football, he returned to his hometown of Philadelphia and quickly realized his interest in coaching after accepting an offer to be the defensive coordinator for Benjamin Franklin High School in 2019. Two years later, he accepted an offer from Dan Mullen to be a volunteer student assistant at Florida, Floyd's alma mater. Floyd spent the 2021 and 2022 seasons working as an undergraduate student assistant at Florida, assisting with the defensive line, while simultaneously completing his bachelor's degree. Additionally, Floyd interned for the Dallas Cowboys during their 2022 training camp as part of the Bill Walsh Diversity Coaching Fellowship, working with his former Florida defensive coordinator, then-Cowboys defensive coordinator Dan Quinn. Floyd returned to Florida in August, retaining his role as a student assistant coach for the remainder of the 2022 season. He graduated from Florida with a bachelor's degree in sociology in May 2023.

On February 19, 2023, Floyd was hired by the Cowboys in a full-time role as an assistant defensive line and defensive quality control coach. On February 15, 2024, he was hired by the Washington Commanders as an assistant defensive line coach, again reuniting with Quinn, who had recently been named head coach of the Commanders. Following the 2025 season and the hiring of Daronte Jones as the team's new defensive coordinator, Floyd was not retained as part of the defensive staff and let go on January 31, 2026.

On July 7, 2026, Floyd was announced as the defensive line coach for the Georgetown Hoyas.
