= Kyle Christy =

American football player (born 1992)

No. 4
- Position: Punter

Personal information
- Born: September 27, 1992 (age 34); Brownsburg, Indiana, U.S.
- Listed height: 6 ft 3 in (1.91 m)
- Listed weight: 215 lb (98 kg)

Career information
- High school: Brownsburg (IN)
- College: Florida
- NFL draft: 2015: undrafted

Career history
- Detroit Lions (2016)*
- * Offseason or practice squad member only

Awards and highlights
- First-team All-SEC (2012); Second-team All-SEC (2014)

Kyle Christy (born September 27, 1992) is an American former professional football punter in the National Football League (NFL) He played college football for the Florida Gators.

== Early life ==
Christy was born in Brownsburg, Indiana, and played football for Brownsburg High School. He was a placekicker until his junior year, when his coach asked him to try punting, as well. Christy made 5 of 8 field goals and 31 of 37 extra-point attempts as a junior. As a senior, he averaged 42 yards per punt and was named to the All-State team.

== College career ==
Christy attended the University of Florida, where he was a member of coach Will Muschamp's Florida Gators football team. In 2011, he had 30 punts and averaged 40.9 yards per punt. He had a career-long 67-yard punt against Auburn. In the 2012 Gator Bowl, he averaged 37.3 yards on three punts, and the Gators won.

In 2012, Christy had 66 punts and averaged 45.8 yards per punt. His punting average topped the Southeastern Conference (SEC). He was named to the All-SEC first-team and was a finalist for the Ray Guy Award. In the 2013 Sugar Bowl, he averaged 41.3 yards on four punts in a loss. Christy was listed by The News-Press as the 10th best kicking teams athlete in Florida Gators history.

== Professional career ==
=== Detroit Lions ===
On April 25, 2016, the Detroit Lions signed Christy to a four-year contract. He was waived on June 2, 2016.

== See also ==
- List of Florida Gators football All-Americans
