= Mike Gillislee =

American football player (born 1990)

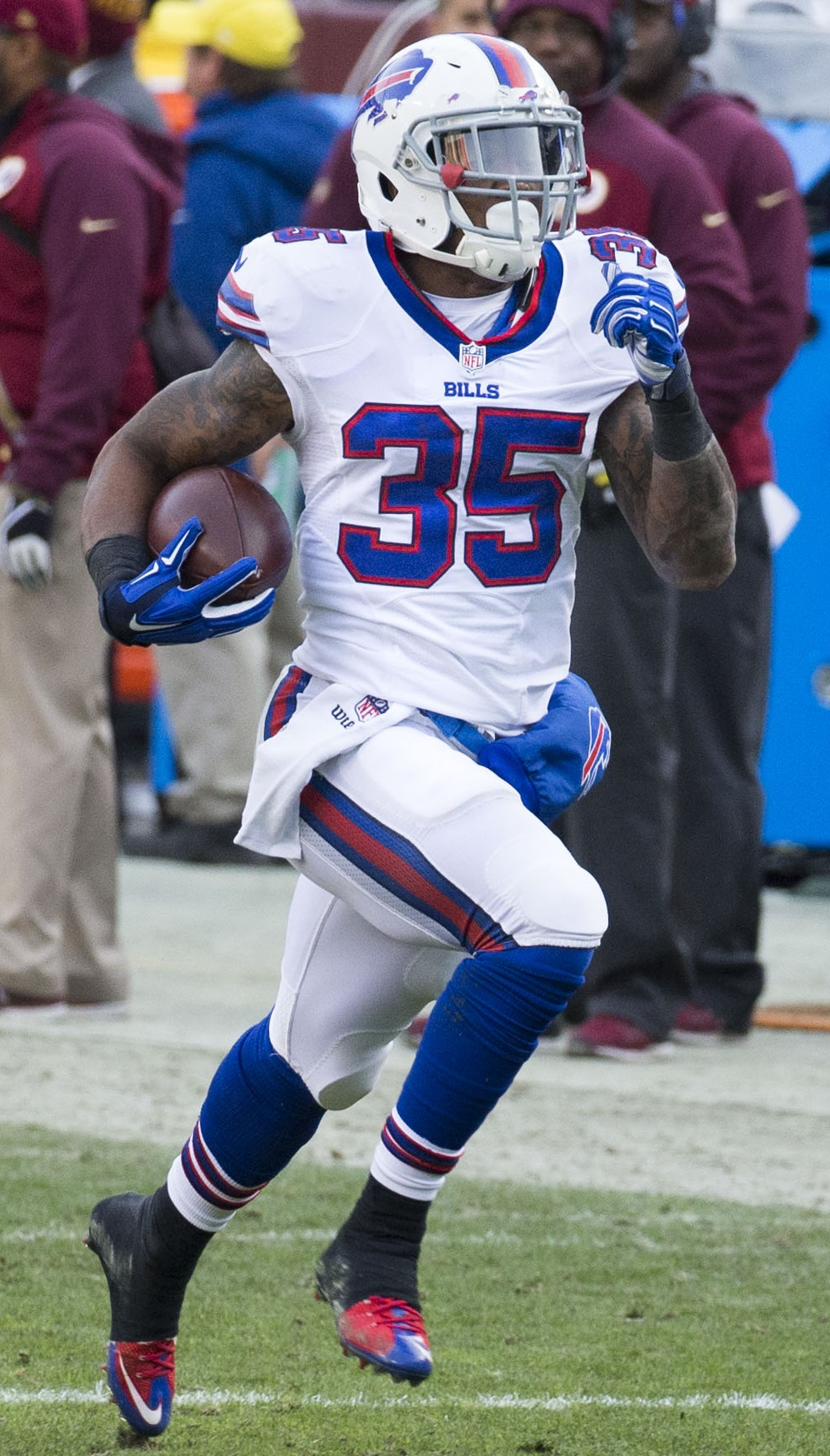
- Gillislee with the Buffalo Bills in 2015

No. 23, 35, 25
- Position: Running back

Personal information
- Born: November 1, 1990 (age 36); DeLand, Florida, U.S.
- Listed height: 5 ft 11 in (1.80 m)
- Listed weight: 210 lb (95 kg)

Career information
- High school: DeLand
- College: Florida (2009–2012)
- NFL draft: 2013: 5th round, 164th overall pick

Career history
- Miami Dolphins (2013–2014); Arizona Cardinals (2015)*; Buffalo Bills (2015–2016); New England Patriots (2017); New Orleans Saints (2018)
- * Offseason or practice squad member only

Awards and highlights
- First-team All-SEC (2012)

Career NFL statistics
- Rushing attempts: 274
- Rushing yards: 1,291
- Rushing touchdowns: 16
- Receptions: 17
- Receiving yards: 103
- Receiving touchdowns: 1
- Stats at Pro Football Reference

Michael B. Gillislee Jr. (born November 1, 1990) is an American former professional football player who was a running back in the National Football League (NFL). He played college football for the Florida Gators. He was selected by the Miami Dolphins in the fifth round of the 2013 NFL draft.

== Early life ==
Gillislee attended DeLand High School in DeLand, Florida. He recorded 900 rushing yards as a sophomore and over 1,200 yards as a junior. As a senior, he rushed for 1,149 yards on 227 carries for a 5.1-yard average. He was considered a four-star recruit by Rivals.com and was rated as the seventh-best all-purpose running back prospect in the nation.

== College career ==
Gillislee accepted an athletic scholarship to attend the University of Florida, where he played under coaches Urban Meyer and Will Muschamp's Florida Gators football teams from 2009 to 2012. As a true freshman in 2009, Gillislee played in 13 games, rushing for 267 yards on 31 carries with two touchdowns. As a sophomore in 2010, he played in 10 games and had 325 rushing yards on 58 carries with seven touchdowns. As a junior in 2011, he rushed for 328 yards on 56 carries with two touchdowns. As a senior in 2012, Gillislee finished the regular season with 1,104 yards on 235 carries and 10 touchdowns. He became the first Florida Gator to go over 1,000 rushing yards since 2004.

=== College statistics ===
Year	G	Rushing			
Year	G	Att	Yds	Avg	TD
2009	13	31	267	8.6	1
2010	12	58	325	5.6	7
2011	11	56	328	5.9	2
2012	13	244	1,152	4.7	10
Career	49	389	2,072	5.3	20

== Professional career ==
Pre-draft measurables
Height	Weight	Arm length	Hand span	Wingspan	40-yard dash	10-yard split	20-yard split	20-yard shuttle	Three-cone drill	Vertical jump	Broad jump	Bench press
5 ft 11 1/8 in (1.81 m)	208 lb (94 kg)	31 1/8 in (0.79 m)	9 3/8 in (0.24 m)	6 ft 2 5/8 in (1.90 m)	4.55 s	1.62 s	2.68 s	4.40 s	7.12 s	30.5 in (0.77 m)	9 ft 11 in (3.02 m)	15 reps
All values from NFL Combine

=== Miami Dolphins ===
The Miami Dolphins selected Gillislee in the fifth round, 164th pick overall, of the 2013 NFL draft. He signed a four-year, $2.322 million contract with the Dolphins on May 19, 2013. On December 1, he made his NFL debut with six rushes for 21 yards against the New York Jets. He only appeared in two other games for the remainder of his rookie season.

After not contributing in the 2014 regular season and being on injured reserve, on September 5, 2015, Gillislee was released by the Dolphins.

=== Arizona Cardinals ===
On September 22, 2015, Gillislee was signed to the Arizona Cardinals' practice squad. He was released from the Cardinals' practice squad on October 22.

=== Buffalo Bills ===
==== 2015 season ====
On November 4, 2015, the Buffalo Bills signed Gillislee to the practice squad. On December 5, Gillislee was promoted to the 53-man roster. During his first game as a member of the Bills, in Week 13 against the Houston Texans, Gillislee broke away for a 30-yard gain, his personal longest rush as an NFL player at the time. On December 13, Gillislee scored his first career touchdown in a game against the Philadelphia Eagles. The following week, he scored his second career touchdown against the Washington Redskins. Gillislee became the first Bills running back since 1997 to produce touchdown runs of at least 50 yards in back-to-back weeks, a 60-yarder in Week 15 and a 50-yarder in Week 16. Overall, he finished his first season with the Bills with 267 rushing yards and three rushing touchdowns.

==== 2016 season ====
On January 4, 2016, the Bills signed Gillislee to a contract extension. After Karlos Williams was released by the Bills after showing up out of shape, he stepped in and took the role of backup running back. Gillislee rushed for 577 yards on 101 carries, and posted 9 receptions with 50 yards receiving. Gillislee's 5.7 yards per carry led all NFL running backs during the 2016 season.

When Gillislee was set to be a restricted free agent, the Bills placed an original round (fifth round) tender on Gillislee. On April 18, 2017, the New England Patriots extended a two-year, $6.4 million offer sheet to Gillislee, giving the Bills five days to match.

=== New England Patriots ===
On April 24, 2017, Gillislee was signed by the New England Patriots. He was offered contracts by both the Bills and the Patriots, but the Bills declined to match the offer made by the Patriots. Gillislee signed for the Patriots on a two-year, $6.4 million deal. In order to sign him, the Patriots had to give up a 2017 fifth round draft pick (which the Bills used to select Matt Milano).

In the season opener against the Kansas City Chiefs on September 7, Gillislee had 15 rushes for 45 yards and a career-high three rushing touchdowns in his Patriots debut. However, he was stopped by the Chiefs' defense on two fourth-down plays in the 42–27 loss. In the game, Gillislee scored the first points of the 2017 NFL season with his first rushing touchdown in the first quarter. In Week 2 against the New Orleans Saints, he followed up his Week 1 performance with 18 carries for 69 yards and a touchdown to bring his season total to four. After a promising start to the season, Gillislee's role was limited and he was inactive for seven games. He finished his first season in New England with 104 carries for 383 yards and 5 touchdowns, and also caught a pass for 15 yards. Gillislee was inactive for the playoffs. Without Gillislee, the Patriots reached Super Bowl LII where they lost by a score of 41-33 to the Philadelphia Eagles.

On September 1, 2018, Gillislee was released by the Patriots after being passed on the depth chart by veteran Jeremy Hill.

=== New Orleans Saints ===
The New Orleans Saints signed Gillislee to a one-year contract on September 2, 2018. He was released on October 6 after Mark Ingram II returned from suspension. He finished the 2018 season with 16 carries for 43 yards.

== NFL career statistics ==
Year	Team	Games		Rushing					Receiving					Fumbles	
Year	Team	GP	GS	Att	Yds	Avg	Lng	TD	Rec	Yds	Avg	Lng	TD	Fum	Lost
2013	MIA	3	0	6	21	3.5	6	0	0	0	0.0	0	0	0	0
2014	MIA	0	0	Did not play due to injury											
2015	BUF	5	1	47	267	5.7	60	3	6	29	4.8	14	0	1	1
2016	BUF	15	1	101	577	5.7	44	8	9	50	5.6	18	1	1	0
2017	NE	9	2	104	383	3.7	16	5	1	15	15.0	15	0	1	1
2018	NO	4	0	16	43	2.7	5	0	1	9	9.0	9	0	1	1
Career		36	4	274	1,291	4.7	60	16	17	103	6.1	18	1	4	3

== Personal life ==
Gillislee is a cousin of NFL wide receiver Louis Murphy.
