= 2011 Kentucky Wildcats football team =

American college football season

2011 Kentucky Wildcats football
- Conference: Southeastern Conference
- Eastern Division
- Record: 5–7 (2–6 SEC)
- Head coach: Joker Phillips (2nd season)
- Offensive coordinator: Randy Sanders (2nd season)
- Offensive scheme: Pro-style
- Defensive coordinator: Rick Minter (1st season)
- Base defense: 4–3
- Captains: Stuart Hines; Danny Trevathan
- Home stadium: Commonwealth Stadium

2011 Southeastern Conference football standings
	Conf.			Overall
Team	W		L	W		L
Eastern Division
No. 19 Georgia x	7	–	1	10	–	4
No. 9 South Carolina	6	–	2	11	–	2
Florida	3	–	5	7	–	6
Vanderbilt	2	–	6	6	–	7
Kentucky	2	–	6	5	–	7
Tennessee	1	–	7	5	–	7
Western Division
No. 2 LSU x$	8	–	0	13	–	1
No. 1 Alabama %#	7	–	1	12	–	1
No. 5 Arkansas	6	–	2	11	–	2
Auburn	4	–	4	8	–	5
Mississippi State	2	–	6	7	–	6
Ole Miss*	0	–	8	2	–	10
Championship: LSU 42, Georgia 10
# – BCS National Champion; $ – BCS representative as conference champion; % – BCS at-large representative; x – Division champion/co-champions; * Ole Miss vacated all wins due to NCAA violations.; Rankings from AP Poll

The 2011 Kentucky Wildcats Football Team represented the University of Kentucky in the college football season of 2011–2012. The team, led by second-year head coach Joker Phillips, played their home games at Commonwealth Stadium, now known as Kroger Field, in Lexington, Kentucky, and competed in the Eastern Division of the Southeastern Conference (SEC).

While the Wildcats ended the season at 5–7 and missed out what would have been their sixth consecutive bowl appearance, they finished on a high. The Wildcats' season-ending 10–7 victory over Tennessee, their first over the Volunteers since 1984, ended what was then the longest current losing streak against an annual opponent in FBS at 26.

== Schedule ==
Date	Time	Opponent	Site	TV	Result	Attendance
September 1	9:15 pm	vs. Western Kentucky*	LP Field; Nashville, TN	ESPNU	W 14–3	24,599
September 10	12:00 pm	Central Michigan*	Commonwealth Stadium; Lexington, KY	ESPNU	W 27–13	58,022
September 17	7:00 pm	Louisville*	Commonwealth Stadium; Lexington, KY (Governor's Cup)	ESPNU	L 17–24	68,170
September 24	7:00 pm	No. 15 Florida	Commonwealth Stadium; Lexington, KY (rivalry)	ESPN	L 10–48	65,134
October 1	12:21 pm	at No. 1 LSU	Tiger Stadium; Baton Rouge, LA	SECN	L 7–35	92,660
October 8	12:21 pm	at No. 18 South Carolina	Williams-Brice Stadium; Columbia, SC	SECN	L 3–54	75,838
October 22	12:00 pm	No. 10(FCS) Jacksonville State*	Commonwealth Stadium; Lexington, KY	ESPNU	W 38–14	54,098
October 29	7:00 pm	Mississippi State	Commonwealth Stadium; Lexington, KY	SECRN	L 16–28	57,891
November 5	3:30 pm	Ole Miss	Commonwealth Stadium; Lexington, KY	ESPNU	W 30–13	56,882
November 12	12:21 pm	at Vanderbilt	Vanderbilt Stadium; Nashville, TN (rivalry)	SECN	L 8–38	33,718
November 19	12:21 pm	at No. 13 Georgia	Sanford Stadium; Athens, GA	SECN	L 10–19	92,746
November 24	12:21 pm	Tennessee	Commonwealth Stadium; Lexington, KY (Battle for the Barrel)	SECN	W 10–7	57,040
*Non-conference game; Rankings from AP Poll released prior to the game; All times are in Eastern time

== Game summaries ==
=== Western Kentucky ===
Team	1	2	3	4	Total
• Kentucky	14	10	7	10	41
Western Kentucky	3	7	10	0	20

- Location: Nashville, Tennessee
- Game start: 8:15 p.m.
- Elapsed time: 3:21
- Game attendance: 24,600
- Game weather: 95, Clear
- Referee: Mark Curles
- TV announcers (ESPNU): Dave Neal (play-by-play), Andre Ware (color), Cara Capuano (sideline)

=== Central Michigan ===
Team	1	2	3	4	Total
Central Michigan	10	3	3	8	24
• #24 Kentucky	7	3	14	14	38

- Location: Lexington, Kentucky
- Game start: 12:00 p.m.
- Elapsed time: 3:22
- Game attendance: 58,022
- Game weather: 67, Mostly Sunny
- Referee: David Smith
- TV announcers (ESPNU): Pam Ward (play-by-play), Dan Hawkins (color)

=== Louisville ===
2011 Governor's Cup

Team	1	2	3	4	Total
• Louisville	7	7	10	7	31
#23 Kentucky	7	7	6	0	20

- Location: Lexington, Kentucky
- Game start: 7:00 p.m.
- Elapsed time: 3:26
- Game attendance: 68,170
- Game weather: 72, Sunny
- Referee: John McDaid
- TV announcers (ESPNU): Clay Matvick (play-by-play), Brian Griese (color), Allison Williams (sideline)

=== Florida ===
Team	1	2	3	4	Total
• #15 Florida	17	7	7	14	45
Kentucky	7	7	7	0	21

- Location: Lexington, Kentucky
- Game start: 7:00 p.m.
- Elapsed time: 3:15
- Game attendance: 65,134
- Game weather: 66, Partly Cloudy
- Referee: Matt Moore
- TV announcers (ESPN): Mark Jones (play-by-play), Ed Cunningham (color), Jeannine Edwards (sideline)

=== LSU ===
Team	1	2	3	4	Total
Kentucky	3	7	8	0	18
• #1 LSU	10	7	14	7	38

- Location: Baton Rouge, Louisiana
- Game start: 11:21 a.m.
- Elapsed time: 3:08
- Game attendance: 92,660
- Game weather: 73, Clear
- Referee: Ken Williamson
- TV announcers (SEC Network): Dave Neal (play-by-play), Andre Ware (color), Cara Capuano (sideline)

=== South Carolina ===
Team	1	2	3	4	Total
Kentucky	3	10	7	0	20
• #18 South Carolina	7	14	19	0	40

- Location: Columbia, South Carolina
- Game start: 12:21 p.m.
- Elapsed time: 3:23
- Game attendance: 75,838
- Game weather: 74, Sunny
- Referee: Tom Ritter
- TV announcers (SEC Network): Dave Neal (play-by-play), Andre Ware (color), Cara Capuano (sideline)

=== Jacksonville State ===
Team	1	2	3	4	Total
Jacksonville State	0	7	0	7	14
• Kentucky	14	14	7	14	49

- Location: Lexington, Kentucky
- Game start: 12:00 p.m.
- Elapsed time: 3:18
- Game attendance: 54,100
- Game weather: 53, Sunny
- Referee: Tom Ritter
- TV announcers (ESPNU): Rob Stone (play-by-play), Danny Kanell (color)

=== Mississippi State ===
Team	1	2	3	4	Total
• Mississippi State	14	7	3	10	34
Kentucky	7	3	3	7	20

- Location: Lexington, Kentucky
- Game start: 7:00 p.m.
- Elapsed time: 3:00
- Game attendance: 57,890
- Game weather: 51, Partly Cloudy
- Referee: David Smith
- TV announcers (FS South): Bob Rathbun (play-by-play), Tim Couch (color), Kristin Akra (sideline)

=== Ole Miss ===
Team	1	2	3	4	Total
Ole Miss	7	0	7	7	21
• Kentucky	7	10	0	7	24

- Location: Lexington, Kentucky
- Game start: 3:30 p.m.
- Elapsed time: 3:21
- Game attendance: 56,882
- Game weather: 58, Sunny
- Referee: Marc Curles
- TV announcers (ESPNU): Clay Matvick (play-by-play), Brian Griese (color), Allison Williams (sideline)

=== Vanderbilt ===
Team	1	2	3	4	Total
Kentucky	7	7	8	0	22
• Vanderbilt	7	17	7	7	38

- Location: Nashville, Tennessee
- Game start: 11:21 a.m.
- Elapsed time: 3:08
- Game attendance: 33,721
- Game weather: 56, Partly Cloudy
- Referee: Matt Moore
- TV announcers (SEC Network): Dave Neal (play-by-play), Andre Ware (color), Cara Capuano (sideline)

=== Georgia ===
Team	1	2	3	4	Total
Kentucky	3	7	10	0	20
• #12 Georgia	7	9	3	7	26

- Location: Athens, Georgia
- Game start: 12:20 p.m.
- TV announcers (SEC Network): Dave Neal (play-by-play), Andre Ware (color), Cara Capuano (sideline)

=== Tennessee ===
Team	1	2	3	4	Total
Tennessee	0	0	0	7	7
• Kentucky	3	0	0	7	10

- Location: Lexington, Kentucky
- Game start: 12:21 p.m.
- Game attendance: 59,858
- TV announcers (SEC Network): Dave Neal (play-by-play), Andre Ware (color), Cara Capuano (sideline)

Scoring summary
1	4:46	KY	Craig McIntosh 24 yard field goal	KY 3-0
4	14:12	KY	CoShik Williams 6 yard run (Craig McIntosh kick)	KY 10-0
4	12:52	TEN	Rajion Neal 53 yard pass from Tyler Bray (Michael Parlady kick)	KY 10-7

== Statistics ==
=== Team ===
	UK	Opp
Scoring	68	88
Points per game	17.0	22.0
First downs	62	69
Rushing	25	38
Passing	26	29
Penalty	11	2
Total offense	1123	1464
Avg per play	4.3	5.4
Avg per game	280.8	366.0
Fumbles-Lost	6–4	3–2
Penalties-Yards	14–112	29–282
Avg per game	28.0	75.0

	UK	Opp
Punts-Yards	23-987	25-945
Avg Net Punt	42.9	37.8
Time of possession/Game	28:13	31:47
3rd down conversions	17/59	22/60
4th down conversions	2/10	1/2
Touchdowns scored	8	10
Field goals-Attempts	4–5	6–7
PAT-Attempts	8–8	10–10
Attendance	191,326	24,599
Games/Avg per Game	63,775	0
Neutral Site Games	0	24,599

==== Scores by quarter ====
	1	2	3	4	Total
Kentucky	9	24	14	21	68
Opponents	41	20	13	14	88

=== Offense ===
==== Rushing ====
Name	GP-GS	Att	Gain	Loss	Net	Avg	TD	Long	Avg/G
Josh Clemons	4–2	87	245	7	200	5.0	2	77	50.0
Morgan Newton	4–0	40	220	120	100	2.5	1	58	25.0
Raymond Sanders	2–2	21	97	0	97	4.6	0	25	48.5
CoShik Williams	3–0	17	64	2	62	3.6	0	9	9.5
Jonathan George	4–0	8	38	0	38	4.8	0	14	9.5
Matt Roark	4–0	1	7	0	7	7.0	0	7	1.8
Brandon Gainer	2–0	4	12	6	6	1.5	0	6	3.0
D.J. Warren	4–0	1	0	1	−1	−1.0	0	0	−0.2
Maxwell Smith	1–0	3	0	−7	−7	−2.3	0	0	−7.0
Demarco Robinson	4–0	3	0	10	−10	−3.3	0	0	−2.5
Total	4	138	645	153	492	3.6	3	87	123.0
Opponents	4	160	885	70	815	5.1	4	84	203.8

==== Passing ====
Name	GP-GS	Effic	Att-Cmp	Pct	Yds	TD-INT	Lng	Avg/G
Morgan Newton	4–4	102.8	59–110	53.6	590	5–6	46	147.5
Maxwell Smith	1–0	85.9	6–11	54.5	41	0–0	10	41.0
Team	0	0.0	0–1	0.0	0	0–0	0	0.0
Total	4	100.4	65–122	53.3	631	5–6	46	157.8
Opponents	4	98.2	53–112	47.3	649	5–7	45	162.2

==== Receiving ====
Name	GP-GS	Receptions	Yds	Avg	TD	Long	Avg/G
La'Rod King	4–4	19	276	14.5	4	46	69.0
EJ Fields	3–0	9	73	8.1	1	14	24.3
Matt Roark	4–1	5	18	3.6	0	8	4.5
Demarco Robinson	4–1	5	17	3.4	0	8	4.2
CoShik Williams	3–0	5	16	3.2	0	12	5.3
Nick Melillo	4–2	4	69	17.2	0	29	17.2
Tyler Robinson	3–0	4	25	6.2	0	8	8.3
Josh Clemons	4–0	3	49	16.3	0	38	12.2
Gene McCaskill	3–3	3	43	14.3	0	34	14.3
Brian Adams	3–0	2	16	8.0	0	12	5.3
Ronnie Shields	2–0	2	10	5.0	0	6	5.0
DJ Warren	4–0	1	8	8.0	0	8	2.0
Stuart Hines	4–0	1	6	6.0	0	6	1.5
Aaron Boyd	2–0	1	5	5.0	0	5	2.5
Raymond Sanders	2–0	1	0	0.0	0	0	0.0
Total	4	65	631	9.7	5	46	157.8
Opponents	4	53	649	12.2	5	45	162.2

=== Defense ===
Name	GP-GS	Tackles				Sacks	Pass defense			Interceptions				Fumbles		Blkd Kick
Name	GP-GS	Solo	Ast	Total	TFL-Yds	No-Yds	BrUp	PD	QBH	No.-Yds	Avg	TD	Long	No.-Yds	FF	Blkd Kick
Danny Trevathan	4–4	22	24	46	5.5–19	2.0–14	2	3	1	1–28	28.0	0	0	0–0	1	0
Winston Guy	4–4	15	26	41	4.5–12	1.0–2	0	2	1	2–0	0.0	0	0	0–0	0	0
Ronnie Sneed	4–4	4	22	26	1.0–3	0–0	1	2	1	1–4	4.0	0	4	0–0	0	0
Martavius Neloms	4–4	10	14	24	0–0	0–0	1	2	0	1–6	6.0	0	6	0–0	0	0
Ridge Wilson	4–4	4	17	21	0.5–1	0–0	0	0	2	0–0	0	0	0	0–0	0	0
Avery Williamson	4–0	8	7	15	0–0	0–0	0	0	0	1–15	15.0	0	0	0–0	0	0
Mikie Benton	4–4	10	5	15	0–0	0–0	3	3	0	0–0	0	0	0	0–0	0	0
Randall Burden	4–4	6	6	14	1.5–13	1.0–12	1	2	1	1–32	0	0	0	0–0	0	0
Donte Rumph	4–1	4	10	14	1.5–2	1.0–2	0	0	0	0–0	0	0	0	0–0	0	0
Collins Ukwu	3–3	8	6	14	3.0–9	1.0–6	1	1	2	0–0	0	0	0	0–0	0	
Mister Cobble	4–1	2	10	12	0.5–2	0–0	0	0	0	0–0	0	0	0	0–0	0	0
Anthony Mosely	4–4	8	2	10	0–0	0–0	0	0	0	0–0	0	0	0	0–0	0	0
Luke McDermott	4–4	4	3	7	1.0–5	1.0–5	0	0	0	0–0	0	0	0	0–0	0	0
Christian Coleman	4–0	2	4	6	0–0	0–0	0	0	0	0–0	0	0	0	0–0	0	0
Antwane Glenn	4–0	1	4	5	0–0	0–0	1	1	0	0–0	0	0	0	0–0	0	0
Mychal Bailey	3–0	4	0	4	0–0	0–0	1	1	0	0–0	0	0	0	0–0	0	0
Taylor Wyndham	4–4	1	2	3	0–0	0–0	1	1	0	0–0	0	0	0	0–0	0	0
Alvin Dupree	4–0	1	2	2	0–0	0–0	0	0	0	0–0	0	0	0	0–0	0	0
Ashely Lowery	4–0	3	0	3	0–0	0–0	0	0	0	0–0	0	0	0	1–0	0	0
Matt Roark	4–0	1	1	2	0–0	0–0	0	0	0	0–0	0	0	0	0–0	0	0
Malcolm McDuffen	4–0	2	0	2	0–0	0–0	0	0	0	0–0	0	0	0	0–0	0	0
EJ Fields	3–0	2	0	2	0–0	0–0	0	0	0	0–0	0	0	0	0–0	0	0
Mike Douglas	2–0	1	1	2	0–0	0–0	0	0	0	0–0	0	0	0	0–0	0	0
Tristian Johnson	4–0	1	0	1	0–0	0–0	0	0	0	0–0	0	0	0	0–0	0	0
Daylen Hall	4–0	0	1	1	0–0	0–0	0	0	0	0–0	0	0	0	0–0	0	0
Gabe Correll	4–0	0	1	1	0–0	0–0	0	0	0	0–0	0	0	0	0–0	0	0
Billy Joe Murphy	2–0	1	0	1	0–0	0–0	0	0	0	0–0	0	0	0	0–0	0	0
Total	4	127	168	295	19–66	7–41	13	20	8	7–85	0	0	32	1–0	2	0
Opponents	4	143	146	289	34–158	16–104	14	20	9	6–48	0	0	0	4–2	6	1

=== Special teams ===
Name	Punting								Field goals				Kickoffs				
Name	No.	Yds	Avg	Long	TB	FC	I20	Blkd	Att.-Made	Pct.	Long	Blkd	No.	Yds	Avg	TB	OB
Ryan Tydlacka	22	976	44.4	59	0	4	7	0	0	0	0	0	0	0	0	0	0
Craig McIntosh	0	0	0	0	0	0	0	0	4–5	.800	45	0	0	0	0	0	0
Joe Mansour	0	0	0	0	0	0	0	0	0	0	0	0	16	1030	64.4	5	0
Total	23	987	42.9	59	0	4	7	1	4–5	.800	45	0	16	1030	64.4	5	0
Opponents	25	945	37.8	58	2	9	10	0	6–7	.860	45	0	20	1293	64.7	3	2

Name	Punt returns					Kick returns				
Name	No.	Yds	Avg	TD	Long	No.	Yds	Avg	TD	Long
Randall Burden	7	10	1.4	0	11	0	0	0.0	0	0
Mychal Bailey	0	0	0	0	0	10	220	22.0	0	36
Raymond Sanders	0	0	0	0	0	3	65	21.7	0	30
Winston Guy	0	0	0	0	0	1	19	19.0	0	19
Demarco Robinson	0	0	0	0	0	1	4	4.0	0	4
Total	7	10	1.4	0	11	15	308	20.5	0	36
Opponents	4	28	7.0	0	13	10	147	14.7	0	27

=== Starters per game ===
Offense

Opponent \ Position	QB	RB	FB/WR	WR	WR/TE	TE/WR	OT	OG	C	OG	OT
Western Kentucky	Newton	Sanders	McCaskill	King	Roark	Aumiller	C. Burden	Mitchell	Lanefski	Warford	Murphy
Central Michigan	Newton	Sanders	Warren	King	McCaskill	Melillo	C. Burden	Hines	Lanefski	Warford	Miller
Louisville	Newton	Clemons	Williams	King	McCaskill	Melillo	C. Burden	Hines	Lanefski	Warford	Miller
Florida	Newton	Clemons	Fields	King	T. Robinson	Melillo	C. Burden	Hines	M. Smith	Warford	Murphy
LSU	Newton	Clemons	Roark	King	T. Robinson	Melillo	C. Burden	Hines	M. Smith	Warford	Murphy
South Carolina	Newton	Clemons	Warren	King	Roark	Melillo	C. Burden	Hines	M. Smith	Warford	Murphy
Jacksonville State	Newton	Sanders	Warren	King	Roark	Melillo	C. Burden	Hines	M. Smith	Warford	Murphy
Mississippi State	Newton	Williams	McCaskill	King	Roark	Melillo	C. Burden	Hines	M. Smith	Warford	Murphy
Ole Miss	Smith										
Vanderbilt	Smith										
Georgia	Smith										
Tennessee	Roark										

Defense

Opponent \ Position	DE	DT	DT/DE	DE/LB	LB	LB	LB/DB	DB	DB/S	S	S
Western Kentucky	Ukwu	McDermott	Wyndham	Wilson	Sneed	Trevathan	Mosley	R. Burden	Benton	Guy	Neloms
Central Michigan	Ukwu	McDermott	Wyndham	Wilson	Sneed	Trevathan	Mosley	R. Burden	Benton	Guy	Neloms
Louisville	Ukwu	McDermott	Wyndham	Wilson	Sneed	Trevathan	Mosley	R. Burden	Bailey	Guy	Neloms
Florida	Glenn	Cobble	Rumph	Wilson	Sneed	Trevathan	Rice	R. Burden	Benton	Guy	Neloms
LSU	Douglas	Cobble	Rumph	Wilson	Sneed	Trevathan	Mosley	R. Burden	Benton	Guy	Neloms
South Carolina	Douglas	Cobble	Rumph	Wilson	Sneed	Trevathan	Mosley	R. Burden	Benton	Guy	Neloms
Jacksonville State	Douglas	Cobble	Rumph	Wilson	Sneed	Trevathan	Mosley	R. Burden	Benton	Guy	Neloms
Mississippi State	Ukwu	Cobble	Rumph	Wilson	Sneed	Trevathan	Mosley	R. Burden	Benton	Guy	Neloms
Ole Miss											
Vanderbilt											
Georgia											
Tennessee											

== Personnel ==
=== Coaching staff ===
Name	Position	Seasons at Kentucky	Alma mater
Joker Phillips	Head coach	9	Kentucky (1986)
Steve Brown	Defensive coordinator	9	Oregon (1982)
Tee Martin	Wide Receivers, Passing Game Coordinator	2	Tennessee (1999)
Greg Nord	Special teams, Tight Ends	2	Kentucky (1978)
Steve Pardue	Running Backs	1	Austin Peay (1985)
Randy Sanders	Offensive coordinator, Quarterbacks	6	Tennessee (1988)
Chuck Smith	Linebackers, Recruiting Coordinator	7	Kentucky (1980)
Mike Summers	Offensive line	2	Georgetown (KY) (1978)
Chris Thurmond	Secondary	4	Tulsa (1975)
David Turner	Defensive line	2	Davidson (1985)

=== Depth chart ===
Defense

FS
15 Martavious Neloms
5 Ashely Lowery

WLB	Mike	SLB
⋅	46 Ronnie Sneed	⋅
2 Alvin Dupree	40 Avery Williamson	⋅

SS
21 Winston Guy
32 Miles Simpson

CB
14 Anthony Mosely
35 Cartier Rice

DE	DT	DT	DE
50 Mike Douglas	97 Mister Cobble	99 Donte Rumph	94 Taylor Wyndham
96 Collins Ukwu	68 Luke McDermott	92 Christian Coleman	60 Alvin Davis

CB
24 Randall Burden
36 Daylen Hall

Offense

WR
16 La'Rod King
87 Brian Adams

WR
85 Gene McCaskill
9 Demarco Robinson

LT	LG	C	RG	RT
66 Chandler Burden	70 Stuart Hines	69 Matt Smith	67 Larry Warford	52 Billy Joe Murphy
74 Trevino Woods	79 Kevin Mitchell	63 Jake Lanefski	74 Trevino Woods	77 Darrian Miller

TE
89 Tyler Robinson
86 Jordan Aumiller

WR
3 Matt Roark
19 EJ Fields

QB
12 Morgan Newton
11 Max Smith

Special teams
PK 93 Craig McIntosh
PK 88 Joseph Mansour
P 9 Ryan Tydlacka
P 88 Joseph Mansour
KR 21 Winston Guy
PR 24 Randall Burden
LS 66 JJ Helton

RB
26 CoShik Williams
25 Jonathan George

=== Roster ===
2011 Kentucky Wildcats football team roster
Players
Coaches
Offense

Pos.	#	Name	Class
QB	7	Bookie Cobbins	Fr
QB	11	Maxwell Smith	Fr
QB	12	Morgan Newton	Jr
QB	14	Ryan Phillipi (*)	So
QB	17	Jacob Russell (*)	So
RB	4	Raymond Sanders	So
RB	20	Josh Clemons	Fr
RB	23	Edmund Allen (*)	Fr
RB	25	Jonathan George	So
RB	26	CoShik Williams (*)	Jr
RB	29	Brandon Gainer	Fr
RB	30	Marcus Caffey	Fr
RB	31	Derek Bishop (*)	Fr
FB	36	Andrew Joseph (*)	So
RB	37	Cody Jones (*)	So
FB	39	D. J. Warren	Fr
RB	43	Toba Omotinugbon (*)	Fr
WR	3	Matt Roark	Sr
WR	9	Demarco Robinson	Fr
WR	16	La'Rod King	Jr
WR	17	Nik Brazley (*)	Sr
WR	19	E. J. Fields	Jr
WR	22	Aaron Boyd	Jr
WR	23	Daryl Collins	Fr
WR	34	Ed Berry (*)	So
WR	35	William Tanner (*)	Fr
WR	81	Rashad Cunningham	Fr
WR	85	Gene McCaskill	Jr
WR	87	Brian Adams	So
TE	42	Nick Melilo (*)	Sr
TE	80	Ronnie Shields	Fr
TE	82	Anthony Kendrick	So
TE	84	Gabe Correll (*)	Jr
TE	86	Jordan Aumiller	So
TE	89	Tyler Robinson	So
OT	52	Billy Joe Murphy	Sr
C	56	Sam Simpson	So
G	59	Kelly Mason (*)	Fr
OT	62	Tyler Davenport (*)	Fr
C	63	Jake Lanefski	Sr
G	64	Max Godby (*)	Fr
OT	66	Chandler Burden	Sr
G	67	Larry Warford	Jr
C	69	Matt Smith	Jr
G	70	Stuart Hines	Sr
OT	71	Jack Gruenschlaeger (*)	Fr
G	73	Stephen Duff (*)	So
OT	74	Trevino Woods	Jr
G	75	Zach West	Fr
OT	76	Teven Eatmon-Nared	Fr
OT	77	Darrian Miller	Fr
G	78	David Noltemeyer (*)	Fr
OT	79	Kevin Mitchell	So

Defense

Pos.	#	Name	Class
DE	45	Antwane Glenn	Sr
DT	51	Tristian Johnson	So
DT	58	Shaq Love	Fr
DE	60	Alvin Davis	Fr
DE	61	Travaughn Paschal	Fr
DT	64	Lionel Inanzala (*)	Fr
DT	65	Luke McDermott (*)	Sr
DT	78	Jacob Lewellen (*)	Jr
DE	91	Farrington Huguenin	Fr
DT	92	Christian Coleman	Fr
DT	92	James McDevitt (*)	Sr
DE	94	Taylor Wyndham	Jr
DE	95	Patrick Ligon	So
DE	96	Collins Ukwu	Jr
DT	97	Mister Cobble	So
DT	98	Mark Crawford	Sr
DT	99	Donte Rumph	So
LB	2	Alvin Dupree	Fr
LB	8	Josh Forrest	Fr
LB	10	Tyler Brause	Fr
LB	40	Avery Williamson	So
LB	41	Danny Trevathan	Sr
LB	44	Tim Patterson	Fr
LB	46	Ronnie Sneed	Sr
LB	47	Jabari Johnson	Fr
LB	48	Ridge Wilson	Jr
LB	49	Demarius Rancifer	Fr
LB	54	Malcolm McDuffen	Fr
LB	56	Trey Edwards (*)	So
LB	90	Justin Henderson	Fr
S	5	Ashely Lowery	Fr
S	6	Taiedo Smith	Sr
CB	14	Anthony Mosley	Sr
CB	15	Martavious Neloms	Jr
S	18	Glenn Faulkner	Fr
S	21	Winston Guy	Sr
CB	24	Randall Burden	Sr
DB	28	Eric Dixon	Fr
S	30	Michael Arnold (*)	Fr
S	31	Mikie Benton (*)	Jr
DB	32	Miles Simpson	Fr
CB	34	Dale Trimble	Fr
CB	35	Cartier Rice	Jr
CB	37	Christian Hudnell (*)	So
CB	38	Eric Simmons	Fr
S	41	Mychal Bailey	Sr

Special teams

Pos.	#	Name	Class
P	9	Ryan Tydlacka	Sr
P	42	Jay Wilmott	Fr
LS	59	Jon Thomas (*)	Sr
LS	81	Kyle Budde (*)	Fr
K	88	Joseph Mansour	So
K	90	Patrick Simmons (*)	So
K	93	Craig McIntosh (*)	Jr

Head coach

Joker Phillips

Coordinators/assistant coaches

See coaching staff

Legend

- (C) Team captain
- (S) Suspended
- (I) Ineligible
- (*) Walk-on
- Injured
- Redshirt

== Signees and commitments ==
=== 2011 class ===
College recruiting information (2011)
Name	Hometown	School	Height	Weight	40^{‡}	Commit date
Marcus Caffey; RB	Atlanta, Georgia	Grady	6 ft 0 in (1.83 m)	190 lb (86 kg)	N/A	Jan 13, 2011
Marcus Caffey; RB	Recruit ratings: Scout: Rivals: (77)					
Josh Clemons; RB	Fayetteville, Georgia	Whitewater	5 ft 10 in (1.78 m)	202 lb (92 kg)	N/A	Dec 24, 2010
Josh Clemons; RB	Recruit ratings: Scout: Rivals: (76)					
Theltus Cobbins; ATH	New Orleans, Louisiana	McDonough 35	6 ft 2 in (1.88 m)	190 lb (86 kg)	N/A	May 21, 2010
Theltus Cobbins; ATH	Recruit ratings: Scout: Rivals: (77)					
Christian Coleman; DE	Milan, Tennessee	Milan	6 ft 4 in (1.93 m)	255 lb (116 kg)	N/A	Jun 23, 2010
Christian Coleman; DE	Recruit ratings: Scout: Rivals: (76)					
Daryl Collins; WR	Gadsden, Alabama	Gadsden	6 ft 4 in (1.93 m)	200 lb (91 kg)	N/A	Feb 2, 2011
Daryl Collins; WR	Recruit ratings: Scout: Rivals: (79)					
Rashad Cunningham; WR	Mobile, Alabama	Davidson	6 ft 4 in (1.93 m)	200 lb (91 kg)	4.4	Aug 31, 2010
Rashad Cunningham; WR	Recruit ratings: Scout: Rivals: (74)					
Nile Daniel; WR	Griffin, Georgia	Griffin	6 ft 0 in (1.83 m)	185 lb (84 kg)	4.4	Jul 28, 2010
Nile Daniel; WR	Recruit ratings: Scout: Rivals: (74)					
Eric Dixon; S	Mobile, Alabama	Prichard	5 ft 11 in (1.80 m)	175 lb (79 kg)	4.5	Nov 19, 2010
Eric Dixon; S	Recruit ratings: Scout: Rivals: (78)					
Alvin Dupree; ATH	Irwinton, Georgia	Wilkinson County	6 ft 5 in (1.96 m)	220 lb (100 kg)	4.6	Jan 19, 2011
Alvin Dupree; ATH	Recruit ratings: Scout: Rivals: (77)					
James Elliot; OG	Pensacola, Florida	Pensacola Catholic	6 ft 4 in (1.93 m)	305 lb (138 kg)	N/A	Feb 2, 2011
James Elliot; OG	Recruit ratings: Scout: Rivals: (79)					
Glen Faulkner; S	East St. Louis, Illinois	East St. Louis	6 ft 2 in (1.88 m)	195 lb (88 kg)	N/A	Mar 4, 2010
Glen Faulkner; S	Recruit ratings: Scout: Rivals: (79)					
Josh Forrest; WR	Paducah, Kentucky	Paducah Tilghman	6 ft 4 in (1.93 m)	190 lb (86 kg)	N/A	May 17, 2010
Josh Forrest; WR	Recruit ratings: Scout: Rivals: (75)					
Daylen Hall; DB	Louisville, Kentucky	St. Xavier	5 ft 10 in (1.78 m)	170 lb (77 kg)	4.3	Jun 25, 2010
Daylen Hall; DB	Recruit ratings: Scout: Rivals: (71)					
Farrington Huguenin; DE	Columbia, South Carolina	Dreher	6 ft 4 in (1.93 m)	240 lb (110 kg)	N/A	Jan 29, 2010
Farrington Huguenin; DE	Recruit ratings: Scout: Rivals: (40)					
Jabari Johnson; LB	Stone Mountain, Georgia	Stephenson	6 ft 2 in (1.88 m)	220 lb (100 kg)	N/A	Oct 29, 2009
Jabari Johnson; LB	Recruit ratings: Scout: Rivals: (77)					
Ashely Lowery; S	Cleveland, Georgia	White County	6 ft 1 in (1.85 m)	190 lb (86 kg)	4.62	Aug 1, 2010
Ashely Lowery; S	Recruit ratings: Scout: Rivals: (75)					
Shaquille Love; DT	Harriman, Tennessee	Harriman	6 ft 5 in (1.96 m)	275 lb (125 kg)	N/A	Sep 28, 2010
Shaquille Love; DT	Recruit ratings: Scout: Rivals: (75)					
Darrian Miller; OT	Lexington, Kentucky	Bryan Station	6 ft 6 in (1.98 m)	265 lb (120 kg)	4.87	Dec 20, 2009
Darrian Miller; OT	Recruit ratings: Scout: Rivals: (79)					
Travaughn Paschal; DE	Grambillis, Maryland	Fork Union	6 ft 4 in (1.93 m)	240 lb (110 kg)	–	Jun 26, 2011
Travaughn Paschal; DE	Recruit ratings: Scout: Rivals: (40)					
Tim Patterson; LB	Louisville, Kentucky	Bryan Station	6 ft 4 in (1.93 m)	225 lb (102 kg)	4.6	Feb 3, 2009
Tim Patterson; LB	Recruit ratings: Scout: Rivals: (75)					
Demarius Rancifer; LB	Pensacola, Florida	Pensacola Catholic	6 ft 3 in (1.91 m)	220 lb (100 kg)	N/A	Jan 23, 2011
Demarius Rancifer; LB	Recruit ratings: Scout: Rivals: (77)					
Demarco Robinson; WR	Lithonia, Georgia	Martin Luther King	5 ft 10 in (1.78 m)	170 lb (77 kg)	4.5	Nov 25, 2010
Demarco Robinson; WR	Recruit ratings: Scout: Rivals: (77)					
Max Smith; QB	Van Nuys, California	Birmingham	6 ft 5 in (1.96 m)	220 lb (100 kg)	N/A	Apr 20, 2010
Max Smith; QB	Recruit ratings: Scout: Rivals: (74)					
Marcoreyon "Bubba" Tandy; ATH	Hopkinsville, Kentucky	Christian County	6 ft 1 in (1.85 m)	185 lb (84 kg)	N/A	Feb 2, 2011
Marcoreyon "Bubba" Tandy; ATH	Recruit ratings: Scout: Rivals: (45)					
Darrell Warren; DE	Alcoa, Tennessee	Alcoa	6 ft 2 in (1.88 m)	215 lb (98 kg)	N/A	Feb 1, 2011
Darrell Warren; DE	Recruit ratings: (40)					
David Washington; DE	Hampton, Georgia	Lovejoy	6 ft 3 in (1.91 m)	270 lb (120 kg)	N/A	Oct 20, 2010
David Washington; DE	Recruit ratings: Scout: Rivals: (74)					
Zach West; OT	Lexington, Kentucky	Lexington Christian	6 ft 5 in (1.96 m)	305 lb (138 kg)	N/A	Aug 25, 2010
Zach West; OT	Recruit ratings: Scout: Rivals: (79)					
Overall recruit ranking:
Note: In many cases, Scout, Rivals, 247Sports, On3, and ESPN may conflict in their listings of height and weight.; In these cases, the average was taken. ESPN grades are on a 100-point scale.; Sources: "Kentucky 2011 Football Commitments". Rivals.; "2011 Kentucky Football Commits". Scout.; "ESPN". ESPN.; "Scout.com Team Recruiting Rankings". Scout.; "2011 Team Ranking". Rivals.com.

=== 2012 class ===
College recruiting information
Name	Hometown	School	Height	Weight	40^{‡}	Commit date
Daron Blaylock; LB	Marietta, Georgia	Walton	6 ft 0 in (1.83 m)	218 lb (99 kg)	4.5	Jun 5, 2011
Daron Blaylock; LB	Recruit ratings: Scout: Rivals: (74)					
Shawn Blaylock; DB	Stone Mountain, Georgia	Stephenson	5 ft 11 in (1.80 m)	175 lb (79 kg)	4.5	Jun 2, 2011
Shawn Blaylock; DB	Recruit ratings: Scout: Rivals: (45)					
Zack Blaylock; DB	Marietta, Georgia	Walton	5 ft 11 in (1.80 m)	175 lb (79 kg)	N/A	Jun 5, 2011
Zack Blaylock; DB	Recruit ratings: Scout: Rivals: (74)					
Thomas Chapman; DT	Louisville, Kentucky	DuPont Manual	6 ft 4 in (1.93 m)	290 lb (130 kg)	N/A	Feb 26, 2011
Thomas Chapman; DT	Recruit ratings: Scout: Rivals: (77)					
Landon Foster; K	Franklin, Tennessee	Independence	6 ft 4 in (1.93 m)	290 lb (130 kg)	N/A	Aug 2, 2011
Landon Foster; K	Recruit ratings: Scout: Rivals: (74)					
Patrick Graffree; DT	Elizabethtown, Kentucky	Central Hardin	6 ft 4 in (1.93 m)	250 lb (110 kg)	N/A	Jun 13, 2011
Patrick Graffree; DT	Recruit ratings: Scout: Rivals: (75)					
J.D. Harmon; WR	Paducah, Kentucky	Paducah Tilghman	6 ft 2 in (1.88 m)	195 lb (88 kg)	N/A	Jan 22, 2011
J.D. Harmon; WR	Recruit ratings: Scout: Rivals: (45)					
Josh Harris; LB	Maysville, Kentucky	Mason County	6 ft 1 in (1.85 m)	200 lb (91 kg)	N/A	Jun 26, 2011
Josh Harris; LB	Recruit ratings: Scout: Rivals: (77)					
Khalid Henderson; LB	Austell, Georgia	Pebblebrook	6 ft 1 in (1.85 m)	205 lb (93 kg)	N/A	Jan 30, 2012
Khalid Henderson; LB	Recruit ratings: Scout: Rivals: (80)					
T.J. Jones; OT	Myrtle Beach, South Carolina	Myrtle Beach	6 ft 5 in (1.96 m)	280 lb (130 kg)	N/A	Aug 2, 2011
T.J. Jones; OT	Recruit ratings: Scout: Rivals: (73)					
A.J. Legree; DB	Fort White, Florida	Ft. White	6 ft 0 in (1.83 m)	180 lb (82 kg)	N/A	Dec 20, 2011
A.J. Legree; DB	Recruit ratings: Scout: Rivals: (75)					
Dy'Shawn Mobley; RB	Powell, Tennessee	Powell	6 ft 1 in (1.85 m)	205 lb (93 kg)	4.55	Nov 21, 2011
Dy'Shawn Mobley; RB	Recruit ratings: Scout: Rivals: (74)					
Zach Myers; OG	Miamisburg, Ohio	Miamisburg	6 ft 4 in (1.93 m)	270 lb (120 kg)	N/A	Jun 30, 2011
Zach Myers; OG	Recruit ratings: Scout: Rivals: (75)					
Langston Newton; DE	Carmel, Indiana	Carmel	6 ft 4 in (1.93 m)	250 lb (110 kg)	N/A	Aug 4, 2011
Langston Newton; DE	Recruit ratings: Scout: Rivals: (78)					
Cody Quinn; DB	Middletown, Ohio	Middletown	5 ft 10 in (1.78 m)	180 lb (82 kg)	N/A	Jan 14, 2011
Cody Quinn; DB	Recruit ratings: Scout: Rivals: (75)					
Jonathan Reed; DB	Indianapolis, Indiana	Pike	5 ft 11 in (1.80 m)	175 lb (79 kg)	4.4	Jun 8, 2011
Jonathan Reed; DB	Recruit ratings: Scout: Rivals: (77)					
Daniel Ross; DE	Louisville, Kentucky	Jeffersontown	6 ft 5 in (1.96 m)	255 lb (116 kg)	N/A	Aug 1, 2011
Daniel Ross; DE	Recruit ratings: Scout: Rivals: (73)					
DeMarcus Sweat; WR	Stone Mountain, Georgia	Stephenson	6 ft 1 in (1.85 m)	185 lb (84 kg)	4.4	May 29, 2011
DeMarcus Sweat; WR	Recruit ratings: Scout: Rivals: (78)					
Jordan Swindle; OT	Jacksonville, Florida	Creekside	6 ft 8 in (2.03 m)	303 lb (137 kg)	N/A	Aug 16, 2011
Jordan Swindle; OT	Recruit ratings: Scout: Rivals: (77)					
Justin Taylor; RB	Atlanta, Georgia	Washington	5 ft 10 in (1.78 m)	210 lb (95 kg)	4.5	Feb 1, 2012
Justin Taylor; RB	Recruit ratings: Scout: Rivals: (78)					
Kadeem Thomas; LB	Tallahassee, Florida	Godby	6 ft 0 in (1.83 m)	235 lb (107 kg)	4.7	Sep 25, 2011
Kadeem Thomas; LB	Recruit ratings: Scout: Rivals: (76)					
Fred Tiller; DB	Homerville, Georgia	Clinch County	6 ft 1 in (1.85 m)	178 lb (81 kg)	4.5	Sep 20, 2011
Fred Tiller; DB	Recruit ratings: Scout: Rivals: (77)					
Jon Toth; OT	Indianapolis, Indiana	Brebeuf Jesuit Prep	6 ft 5 in (1.96 m)	290 lb (130 kg)	N/A	Jul 6, 2011
Jon Toth; OT	Recruit ratings: Scout: Rivals: (73)					
Patrick Towles; QB	Ft. Thomas, Kentucky	Highlands	6 ft 5 in (1.96 m)	232 lb (105 kg)	4.7	Apr 1, 2011
Patrick Towles; QB	Recruit ratings: Scout: Rivals: (79)					
Jordan Watson; OG	Fayetteville, Georgia	Whitewater	6 ft 4 in (1.93 m)	285 lb (129 kg)	N/A	Jul 5, 2011
Jordan Watson; OG	Recruit ratings: Scout: Rivals: (75)					
Jalen Whitlow; ATH	Prattville, Alabama	Prattville	6 ft 3 in (1.91 m)	200 lb (91 kg)	N/A	Jan 31, 2012
Jalen Whitlow; ATH	Recruit ratings: Scout: Rivals: (76)					
Overall recruit ranking:
Note: In many cases, Scout, Rivals, 247Sports, On3, and ESPN may conflict in their listings of height and weight.; In these cases, the average was taken. ESPN grades are on a 100-point scale.; Sources: "Kentucky 2012 Football Commitments". Rivals.; "2012 Kentucky Football Commits". Scout.; "ESPN". ESPN.; "Scout.com Team Recruiting Rankings". Scout.; "2012 Team Ranking". Rivals.com.
