= Matt Patchan =

American football player (born 1990)

No. 78
- Position: Offensive tackle

Personal information
- Born: April 2, 1990 (age 36); Tampa, Florida, U.S.
- Listed height: 6 ft 7 in (2.01 m)
- Listed weight: 300 lb (136 kg)

Career information
- High school: Armwood (Seffner, Florida)
- College: Boston College
- NFL draft: 2014: undrafted

Career history
- Tampa Bay Buccaneers (2014–2015)*
- * Offseason or practice squad member only
- Stats at Pro Football Reference

Matt Patchan (born April 2, 1990) is an American former football offensive lineman. Patchan played college football at Boston College.

== College career ==
Played senior season (2013) at Boston College and started all 13 games at left tackle. Was named second-team All-ACC as a left tackle after senior year (2013). Earned ACC Offensive Lineman of the Week honors after helping running back Andre Williams rush for 263 yards and two touchdowns against Maryland (11/23/13). Part of an offensive line that helped the team rush for at least 100 yards in 11 games, 200 yards in six games, 300 yards in three games and 400 yards in one game. Helped Andre Williams become the 16th running back in FBS history to rush for 2,000 yards in a single season. Prior to playing at Boston College, Patchan attended Florida where he appeared in 27 games with eight starts (2008-2011), playing on both the defensive line and offensive line. Started 7-of-12 games at right tackle in 2011. Missed 2010 season due to injury. Played in first four games of sophomore (2009) season before an injury sidelined him for the rest of the year. Played in 11 games and recorded seven tackles and 1.5 sacks as a freshman (2008).

== Professional career ==
Patchan signed with the team on May 12, 2014 as an undrafted free agent after a good showing in the rookie free agent mini camp held by the Buccaneers. He was eventually cut during final roster cuts but during the regular season he was resigned to the team's practice squad where he would remain.

One week after the conclusion to the 2014 regular season Patchan as well as 6 other players on practice squads were resigned to 2015 contracts for the summer's training camp.
