= Valdez Showers =

American football player (born 1993)

No. 10
- Position: Wide receiver

Personal information
- Born: June 28, 1993 (age 33); Detroit, Michigan, U.S.
- Listed height: 6 ft 0 in (1.83 m)
- Listed weight: 198 lb (90 kg)

Career information
- High school: Madison (MI)
- College: Florida
- NFL draft: 2016: undrafted

Career history
- Washington Redskins (2016)*; Indianapolis Colts (2017)*
- * Offseason or practice squad member only

Valdez Showers (born June 28, 1993) is an American former football wide receiver. He was signed by the Washington Redskins as an undrafted free agent after the 2016 NFL draft. He played college football at Florida.

== Professional career ==
=== Washington Redskins ===
On May 6, 2016, Showers was signed by the Washington Redskins as an undrafted free agent. He was waived on August 27, 2016.

=== Indianapolis Colts ===
On August 9, 2017, Showers was signed by the Indianapolis Colts. He was waived on September 2, 2017.
