= Tevin Westbrook =

American football player (born 1993)

No. 87, 81
- Position: Tight end

Personal information
- Born: January 17, 1993 (age 33); Coconut Creek, Florida, U.S.
- Listed height: 6 ft 5 in (1.96 m)
- Listed weight: 257 lb (117 kg)

Career information
- High school: Coconut Creek (FL) North Broward
- College: Florida
- NFL draft: 2015: undrafted

Career history
- Tennessee Titans (2015)*; Tampa Bay Buccaneers (2015); Tampa Bay Buccaneers (2016–2017)*
- * Offseason or practice squad member only
- Stats at Pro Football Reference

Tevin Westbrook (born January 17, 1993) is an American former football tight end. He played college football at Florida.

== Early life ==
A Rivals.com three-star defensive end prospect from Florida, Westbrook helped North Broward Prep School to a 6–3 record his senior year. He chose the University of Florida over UConn, North Carolina, Purdue and USF.

== College career ==
As a true freshman in 2011, Westbrook appeared in only three games. He moved to tight end in 2012, where he saw action in all 13 games and one start against Bowling Green, but did not record a catch all season. In 2013, he played in all 12 games with two starts, totaling three catches for 30 yards. In 2014, he played in all 12 games with two starts, totaling eight catches for 81 yards. He caught two passes for 25 yards against Kentucky and scored his first career touchdown.

== Professional career ==
=== Tennessee Titans ===
Westbrook signed with the Tennessee Titans as an undrafted free agent on May 18, 2015. He was waived by the Titans on September 1, 2015, and was signed to the practice squad on September 5, 2015. He was released on September 22, 2015.

=== Tampa Bay Buccaneers ===
On September 30, 2015, Westbrook was signed to the Tampa Bay Buccaneers' practice squad. He was promoted to the active roster on December 30, 2015.

On August 28, 2016, Westbrook was waived by the Buccaneers. On October 17, 2016, he was re-signed to the practice squad. He signed a reserve/future contract with the Buccaneers on January 2, 2017.

On September 2, 2017, Westbrook was waived the Buccaneers.
