= 2012 Gator Bowl =

2012 TaxSlayer.com Gator Bowl
- 67th Gator Bowl
Ohio State Buckeyes	Florida Gators
(6–6)	(6–6)
Big Ten	SEC
17	24
Head coach: Luke Fickell (interim)	Head coach: Will Muschamp
	1	2	3	4	Total
Ohio State	0	10	0	7	17
Florida	7	7	7	3	24
- Date: January 2, 2012
- Season: 2011
- Stadium: EverBank Field
- Location: Jacksonville, Florida
- MVP: Andre Debose (WR, Florida) & Etienne Sabino (LB, Ohio State)
- Favorite: Florida by 2
- Referee: Cooper Castleberry (MWC)
- Attendance: 61,312
- Payout: US$2.5 million per team

United States TV coverage
- Network: ESPN2
- Announcers: Mike Patrick (Play-by-Play); Ed Cunningham (Analyst); Jeannine Edwards (Sidelines)
- Nielsen ratings: 1.85

The 2012 TaxSlayer.com Gator Bowl, the 67th edition of the game, was a post-season American college football bowl game, held on January 2, 2012 at EverBank Field in Jacksonville, Florida as part of the 2011–12 NCAA Bowl season. TaxSlayer.com was named the corporate title sponsor on September 1, 2011. The game, which was telecasted at 1:00 p.m. ET on ESPN2, featured the Ohio State Buckeyes of the Big Ten Conference versus the Florida Gators of the Southeastern Conference.

The game was a rematch of the 2007 BCS National Championship Game, where Florida emerged victorious. Florida's head coach for the 2007 game, Urban Meyer, was named head coach at Ohio State in November 2011 and took over the Buckeye football program in the 2012 season. As such, this game is sometimes referred to as the Urban Meyer Bowl.

== Teams ==
The Buckeyes finished fourth in the Big Ten Leaders Division, while the Gators finished the season third in the Southeastern Conference Eastern Division. The two teams have played once before, in the 2007 Tostitos BCS National Championship Game. In that game, No. 2 Florida defeated No. 1 Ohio State 41–14 to claim the 2006 national title.

Some referred to the game as the “Urban Bowl” or “Traitor Bowl” by Gators fans because Urban Meyer had been hired as the new Ohio State head coach less than a year after leaving Florida. Luke Fickell served as the interim head coach for Ohio State, while Brian White served as the interim offensive coordinator for Florida and called the plays, since offensive coordinator Charlie Weis had left to take the head coaching job at Kansas.

Ohio State and Florida were tied 7–7 in the first half, but dominant special teams play - including a kickoff return and blocked punt return for a touchdown - led the Gators (7–6) to a 24–17 victory over the struggling Buckeyes (6–7). It is the first time since 1999 that Ohio State has had a non-winning record, and the first time since 1988 that Ohio State had a losing season. It was Florida's 32nd consecutive winning season dating back to 1979. The Buckeyes will not be eligible for a 2012 bowl game or the Big Ten title. The Gators would return in 2012 with a new offensive coordinator, Brent Pease, and a new starting quarterback.
