= Will Muschamp =

American football player and coach (born 1971)

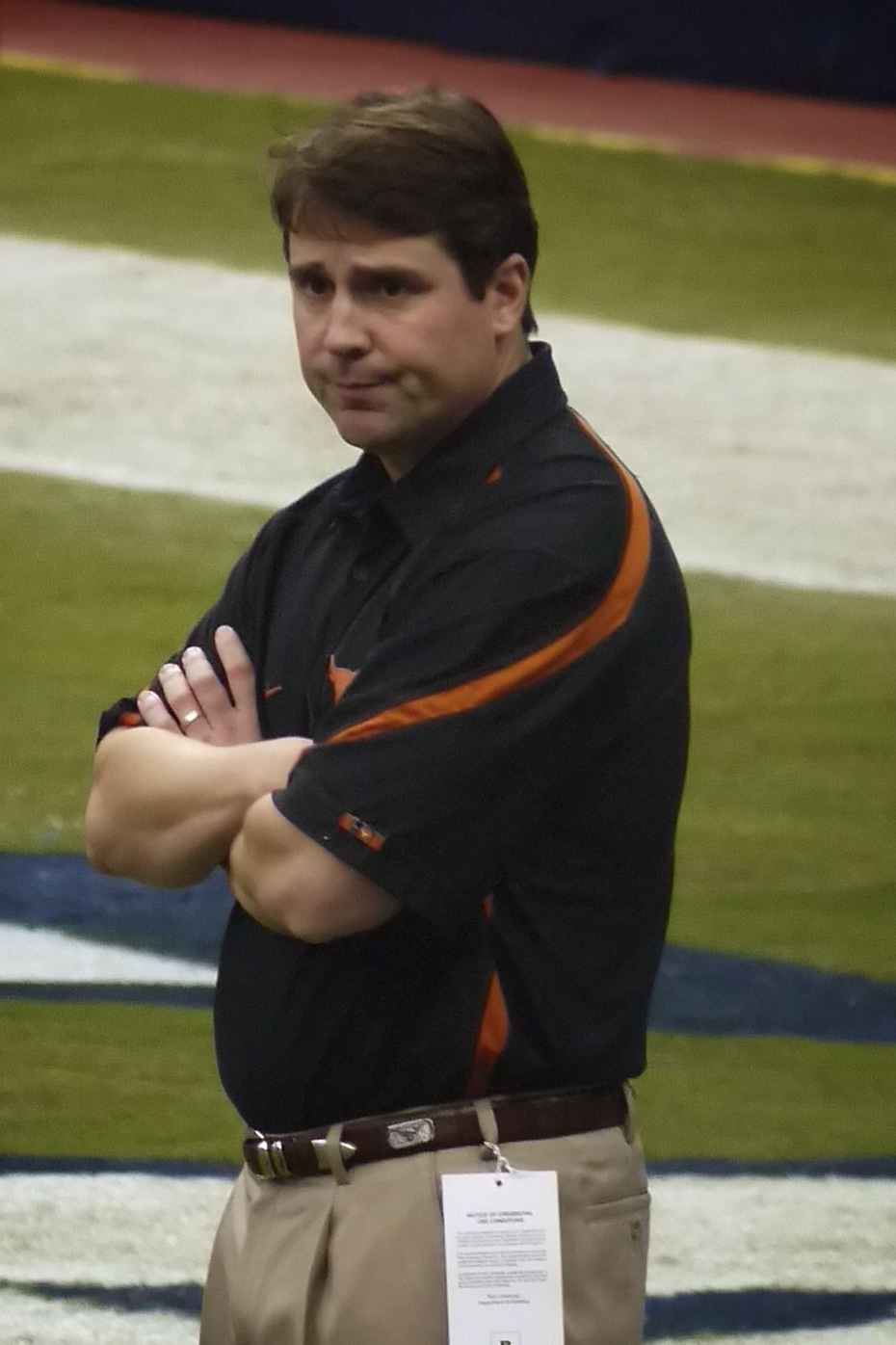
- Muschamp at Texas in 2010

Current position
- Title: Defensive coordinator
- Team: Texas
- Conference: SEC

Biographical details
- Born: August 3, 1971 (age 55); Rome, Georgia, U.S.

Playing career
- 1991–1994: Georgia
- Position: Safety

Coaching career (HC unless noted)
- 1995–1996: Auburn (GA)
- 1998: West Georgia (DB)
- 1999: Eastern Kentucky (DB)
- 2000: Valdosta State (DC/DB)
- 2001: LSU (LB)
- 2002–2004: LSU (DC)
- 2005: Miami Dolphins (AHC)
- 2006–2007: Auburn (DC/DB)
- 2008–2010: Texas (DC/LB)
- 2011–2014: Florida
- 2015: Auburn (DC)
- 2016–2020: South Carolina
- 2021: Georgia (STC)
- 2022–2023: Georgia (co-DC/S)
- 2024–2025: Georgia (defensive analyst)
- 2026–present: Texas (DC)

Head coaching record
- Overall: 55–51
- Bowls: 2–3

Accomplishments and honors

Awards
- SEC Co-Coach of the Year (2012)

William Lawrence Muschamp (born August 3, 1971) is an American football coach and former player who is the current defensive coordinator at the University of Texas at Austin. He served as head football coach at the University of Florida from 2011 to 2014 and at the University of South Carolina from 2016 to 2020, with both tenures starting out successfully and ending disastrously. He is known for his abrasive personality, particularly his sideline demeanor and tirades directed at both players and officials. His was nicknamed "Coach Boom" due to his volatile temper.

In his second season as defensive coordinator at Auburn, in 2007, Muschamp was a finalist for the Broyles Award for the most outstanding assistant coach in college football. Before he accepted the position of coach for Florida, the University of Texas announced that Muschamp would later succeed Mack Brown as head coach of the Longhorns designating him as the "head coach in waiting."

== Early years ==
Muschamp was born in Rome, Georgia, but grew up in Gainesville, Florida. He attended Martha Manson Academy elementary school and Oak Hall High School in Gainesville. His family returned to Rome when his father became the Lower School Principal at Darlington School. Muschamp graduated from Darlington, where he played football, basketball, and baseball, and ran track.

== College career ==
Muschamp attended the University of Georgia. He walked on to the Georgia Bulldogs football team and played safety from 1991 to 1994. As an undergraduate, he was a member of Kappa Alpha Order and made the SEC Academic Honor Roll in 1993. He was a defensive team captain his senior season and played in two bowl games with the Bulldogs. Bulldogs quarterback Mike Bobo, who was Muschamp's college teammate, described him as "a hard worker. Very physical. Very intense." Muschamp graduated from the University of Georgia with a bachelor's degree in 1994.

== Coaching career ==
After graduating from Georgia, Muschamp became a graduate assistant coach at Auburn University, where he worked under defensive coordinators Wayne Hall and Bill Oliver in 1995 and 1996. He earned a master's degree in education from Auburn in 1996, then spent a season each at the University of West Georgia and Eastern Kentucky University as the defensive backs coach, before becoming the defensive coordinator at Valdosta State University in 2000.

=== LSU ===
Muschamp joined Nick Saban's staff at LSU as the linebackers coach in 2001, before becoming the LSU defensive coordinator in 2002. In 2003, LSU won the BCS Championship. That season Muschamp's defense led the nation in both scoring defense (11.0 points per game) and total defense (252.0 yards per game). The Tigers topped the SEC in every major defensive category and also ranked second nationally in defensive pass efficiency (89.8 rating) and third in rushing defense (67.0 yards per game). While at LSU, Muschamp coached four All-Americans including Bradie James, Chad Lavalais, Corey Webster and Marcus Spears. Muschamp left LSU with Saban after the 2004 season to join the Miami Dolphins staff as the assistant head coach.

=== Miami Dolphins ===
As assistant head coach/defense of the Miami Dolphins, Muschamp along with defensive coordinator Richard Smith supervised a defense that ranked fifteenth in total defense in the NFL. The Dolphins allowed 19.8 points per game and 317.4 total yards per game during the 2005 NFL season. The unit also ranked second in the NFL with 49 quarterback sacks.

=== Auburn ===
When the Auburn defensive coordinator position became available in January 2006, Muschamp took the opportunity to return to the college game. In 2006, Muschamp's first season at Auburn, the defense finished seventh among NCAA Division I-FBS teams in scoring defense, allowing only 21 touchdowns. In 2007, Auburn led the SEC in scoring defense and finished in the top 10 in four defensive categories, ranking 7th nationally in pass efficiency and 6th nationally in total defense, passing defense, and scoring defense among NCAA Division I-FBS teams.

=== Texas ===
On January 3, 2008, Muschamp interviewed for the vacant co-defensive coordinator job for the University of Texas. The next day, he resigned from Auburn to accept the position with Texas. Muschamp was slated to receive a raise to $425,000 per year with a two-year, no buyout, contract at Auburn for 2008, which would have made him the highest-paid assistant coach in the SEC. Muschamp received a contract with a $425,000 annual salary at Texas, making him the highest-paid assistant coach in the Big 12.

On November 18, 2008, the University of Texas announced Muschamp would succeed Brown whenever he retired. They agreed in principle to increase Muschamp's salary to $900,000. There was no timetable set for Brown's departure, and both Brown and UT said they expected Brown to stay a long time. Fifty-nine-year-old Brown was under contract as head coach through 2016. After Brown's retirement Muschamp was supposed to get a five-year contract as the head coach.

In announcing the move the University of Texas said, "Muschamp's Longhorn defense is leading the Big 12 in rushing defense (82.5 ypg/25th NCAA) and scoring defense (19.5 ppg/25th NCAA). UT ranks second nationally with four sacks per game. The Horns have held all of their Big 12 opponents below their season scoring average and limited six foes to 14 points or less." UT Athletics Director DeLoss Dodds said, "With the landscape in college football and all of the changes around the country, I've been looking at this for the last couple of years. When it's not working, you have to go outside and make changes. Things are going well here, it's working, so it's best to be prepared to build from inside and that's what we're doing. Mack has provided outstanding leadership and continues to elevate our football program to a level as high as anyone in the country. We hope he stays a long time and he will be our coach as long as he wants, but this assures us that when the time comes, we have the right guy to step up into that position and continue to build on the great things we're accomplishing."

Prior to this announcement, Muschamp had been mentioned in association with head coaching job openings at Clemson, Tennessee, Washington, and Auburn. He had been planning an off-week interview with Clemson but as a result of this deal decided instead to wait his turn at Texas, saying, "This is a special place. I think it is 'the' elite job in the country." Austin American-Statesman columnist Kirk Bohls predicted this would be good for the program: "Muschamp's ascension conveys to fans and recruits that Texas values what it has now as one of the elite programs in the country and wants to maintain. This smart, bold move should bring coaching stability, sustained recruiting and possibly expanded recruiting into the Southeast and a continued framework for success."

=== Florida ===
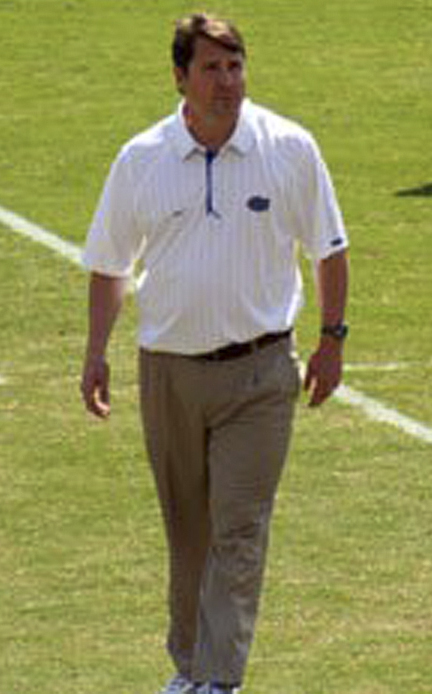
Muschamp as Florida's head coach in 2011

On December 11, 2010, University of Florida athletic director Jeremy Foley named Muschamp to succeed Urban Meyer as the 23rd head coach of the Florida Gators football program. In his first year as head coach, Muschamp led the Gators to a 7–6 record overall and a 3–5 record in the SEC. This was the first losing conference record for the Gators since 1979. In 2011, Muschamp's Gators struggled on offense, ranking 98th in total offense and 83rd in passing offense. Muschamp's Gators earned a 24–17 Gator Bowl victory over the Ohio State Buckeyes playing under interim coach, Luke Fickell. The following spring, Muschamp brought in the No. 5 recruiting class in the nation according to Scout.com. However, the class had no top offensive talent and only two offensive linemen.

In 2012, Muschamp led the Gators to an 11–2 season with four wins over teams that were ranked among the top twelve of the BCS standings at the end of the regular season including Texas A&M, LSU, South Carolina, and Florida State. The season also included a near loss to a non-BCS school Louisiana-Lafayette and a loss to Georgia in which Muschamp's Gators scored no touchdowns, costing the Gators the SEC East Division title. The season ended with a disappointing 33–23 loss to the Louisville Cardinals in the Sugar Bowl. Although the 2012 Gators had a top defense, the season was primarily hampered by the lack of offensive output again. In 2012, the Gators offense ranked 97th in total offense and 116th (out of 124 teams) in passing offense. The following spring, Muschamp brought in the No. 7 recruiting class in the nation according to Scout.com.

It initially appeared the success would continue in 2013, when the Gators started out 4–1. However, they lost seven consecutive games, their longest losing streak in recent memory. The 4–8 record was the Gators' first losing season since 1979. Muschamp again had a losing record in the SEC, 3–5. This made Muschamp the first Gators coach to have two losing SEC records since the 1950s. This also ended a 22-year bowl streak that dated back to 1991. The season included two particularly humiliating losses. The first was a homecoming loss to Vanderbilt—their first loss to the Commodores since 1988 and first at home since 1945. Muschamp's Gators also lost to an FCS team, Georgia Southern, the first loss to a lower division team in the history of the program. Muschamp lost to traditional rival Georgia for the third consecutive year, and a 30-point loss to Florida State in the season's final game dropped his record against the Seminoles to 1–2. The Gator defense was again one of the best in the nation, ranking eighth in total defense. However, the Gator offense was again ineffective, ranking 114th nationally in total offense and 107th in passing. After the season, Florida athletic director Jeremy Foley brought Muschamp back for another season. The following spring, Muschamp's Gators brought in the No. 9 recruiting class, which trailed five other SEC teams and rival Florida State.

Despite a lackluster 2013 season, expectations were high for Muschamp and the Gators for the 2014 campaign. After a 42–13 homecoming loss to Missouri, some Gator fans called for Muschamp to be fired immediately. However, Foley refused to do so and allowed Muschamp to coach the annual Florida–Georgia game. Florida, a 10-point underdog started true freshman Treon Harris, who threw the ball only six times. The Gators compiled 428 yards rushing to upset the 11th ranked Bulldogs 38–20. However, after a 23–20 overtime home loss to South Carolina two weeks later on November 16, 2014, Foley announced that Muschamp would be stepping down following the conclusion of the 2014 regular season. Muschamp remarked, "I was given every opportunity to get it done here, and I simply didn't win enough games. That is the bottom line. I'm disappointed that I didn't get it done, and it is my responsibility to get it done."

=== Return to Auburn ===
On December 12, 2014, a week after the end of the regular season, Muschamp became defensive coordinator for the Auburn Tigers. He agreed to a three-year deal with the Tigers that was worth between $1.6 million and $1.8 million annually. This deal made him the highest-paid defensive coordinator in college football. He became Auburn's fourth defensive coordinator in five years and replaced Ellis Johnson, who was fired the day after the Tigers' 55-44 loss to Alabama in November of the same year.

=== South Carolina ===
On December 6, 2015, Muschamp was announced as the 34th head football coach of the South Carolina Gamecocks. Muschamp inherited a 3–9 team and went 6–7 in his first season as head coach of the Gamecocks.

In his second season at the helm, Muschamp improved to 9–4, including a 26–19 win over Michigan in the Outback Bowl. South Carolina's 5–3 conference record marked the program's first winning record in conference play since 2013 under then-head coach Steve Spurrier.

In his third season as head coach of the Gamecocks, Muschamp led South Carolina to a 7–5 regular season record. Muschamp's 22 wins through his first three seasons at South Carolina is the most among Gamecock head football coaches.

His fourth season came with one of the toughest schedules in the nation. South Carolina finished the season 4–8, although they did upset #3 Georgia on the road. After that season, his record was 26–25, and his 25 losses through his first four seasons is the most among Gamecock head football coaches.

South Carolina fired Muschamp during the 2020 football season on November 15 following a disappointing outing. Offensive coordinator Mike Bobo replaced him as interim head coach with three games left in the season.

=== Georgia ===
On February 3, 2021, Georgia head coach Kirby Smart announced that Muschamp had been hired as a defensive analyst. According to Smart, Muschamp would work with the defense and "help coach the coaches". However, Muschamp assumed the mantle of special teams coordinator prior to the start of the 2021 season after Scott Cochran, the incumbent special teams coordinator, stepped away for health-related reasons.

Following the departure of Dan Lanning to become the head coach of the Oregon Ducks, Muschamp was promoted to co-defensive coordinator of the Bulldogs, alongside Glenn Schumann. On January 10, 2022, the Bulldogs won the National Championship against the Alabama Crimson Tide. He won his second title with the Georgia coaching staff, and third overall, when they defeated TCU in the National Championship.

On January 13, 2024, Georgia announced that Muschamp would transition to an off-field analyst role to spend more time with his family. Travaris Robinson, who served on Muschamp's staff at Florida and South Carolina, was named as his replacement the same day.

=== Return to Texas ===
On December 18, 2025, Texas announced that Muschamp would return to the program as its defensive coordinator, replacing Pete Kwiatkowski.

== Personal life ==
Muschamp's wife Carol (née Davis) is from Thomaston, Georgia. They have two sons, Jackson and Whit. His brother Mike Muschamp is the head football coach at The Lovett School in Atlanta; he led the team to a state championship in 2013.

Jackson is a walk-on backup quarterback for the Georgia Bulldogs. Whit is a backup quarterback for the Vanderbilt Commodores.

== Head coaching record ==
Year	Team	Overall	Conference	Standing	Bowl/playoffs	Coaches^{#}	AP^{°}
Florida Gators (Southeastern Conference) (2011–2014)
2011	Florida	7–6	3–5	3rd (Eastern)	W Gator		
2012	Florida	11–2	7–1	T–1st (Eastern)	L Sugar^{†}	10	9
2013	Florida	4–8	3–5	5th (Eastern)			
2014	Florida	6–6	4–4	3rd (Eastern)	Birmingham (Note: Muschamp was fired after the regular season; D. J. Durkin coached the bowl game.)		
Florida:		28–21	17–15				
South Carolina Gamecocks (Southeastern Conference) (2016–2020)
2016	South Carolina	6–7	3–5	T–5th (Eastern)	L Birmingham		
2017	South Carolina	9–4	5–3	2nd (Eastern)	W Outback		
2018	South Carolina	7–6	4–4	T–4th (Eastern)	L Belk		
2019	South Carolina	4–8	3–5	T–4th (Eastern)			
2020	South Carolina	2–5 (Note: Muschamp was fired with three games remaining; Mike Bobo finished out the season.)	2–5	(Eastern)			
South Carolina:		28–30	17–22				
Total:		56–51					
National championship Conference title Conference division title or championship game berth
^{†}Indicates BCS bowl.; ^{#}Rankings from final Coaches Poll.; ^{°}Rankings from final AP Poll.

== See also ==
- List of Auburn University people
- List of Kappa Alpha Order members
- List of University of Georgia people

== Bibliography ==
- 2012 Florida Football Media Guide, University Athletic Association, Gainesville, Florida (2012).
