= 2011 Arkansas Razorbacks football team =

American college football season

2011 Arkansas Razorbacks football

Cotton Bowl Classic champion

Cotton Bowl Classic, W 29–16 vs. Kansas State
- Conference: Southeastern Conference
- Western Division

Ranking
- Coaches: No. 5
- AP: No. 5
- Record: 11–2 (6–2 SEC)
- Head coach: Bobby Petrino (4th season)
- Offensive coordinator: Garrick McGee (2nd season)
- Offensive scheme: Multiple
- Defensive coordinator: Willy Robinson (4th season)
- Base defense: 4–3
- Captains: Jake Bequette; Knile Davis; Jerry Franklin; Jerico Nelson; Tyler Wilson; Jarius Wright
- Home stadium: Donald W. Reynolds Razorback Stadium; War Memorial Stadium

2011 Southeastern Conference football standings
| | Conf. | | | Overall |
| Team | W | | L | W | | L |
|---|---|---|---|---|---|---|
Eastern Division
| No. 19 Georgia x | 7 | – | 1 | 10 | – | 4 |
| No. 9 South Carolina | 6 | – | 2 | 11 | – | 2 |
| Florida | 3 | – | 5 | 7 | – | 6 |
| Vanderbilt | 2 | – | 6 | 6 | – | 7 |
| Kentucky | 2 | – | 6 | 5 | – | 7 |
| Tennessee | 1 | – | 7 | 5 | – | 7 |
Western Division
| No. 2 LSU x$ | 8 | – | 0 | 13 | – | 1 |
| No. 1 Alabama %# | 7 | – | 1 | 12 | – | 1 |
| No. 5 Arkansas | 6 | – | 2 | 11 | – | 2 |
| Auburn | 4 | – | 4 | 8 | – | 5 |
| Mississippi State | 2 | – | 6 | 7 | – | 6 |
| Ole Miss* | 0 | – | 8 | 2 | – | 10 |
Championship: LSU 42, Georgia 10
# – BCS National Champion; $ – BCS representative as conference champion; % – BCS at-large representative; x – Division champion/co-champions; * Ole Miss vacated all wins due to NCAA violations.; Rankings from AP Poll

The 2011 Arkansas Razorbacks football team represented the University of Arkansas as a member of the Southeastern Conference (SEC) during the 2011 NCAA Division I FBS football season. Led by Bobby Petrino in his fourth and final season as head coach, the Razorbacks compiled an overall record of 11–2 with a mark of 6–2 in conference play, placing third in the SEC's Western Division, behind LSU and Alabama, the two teams that played in the BCS National Championship Game. Arkansas as invited to the 2012 Cotton Bowl Classic, where Razorbacks defeated Kansas State to cap off the third 11-win season in program history. They also finished fifth in the final AP poll, Arkansas' highest national ranking since finishing third in 1977. The team played five home games at Donald W. Reynolds Razorback Stadium in Fayetteville, Arkansas and two home games at War Memorial Stadium in Little Rock, Arkansas.

Tyler Wilson became the first Arkansas quarterback to be voted first team All-SEC. Wide receiver Jarius Wright, defenseive end Jake Bequette, and return specialist Joe Adams were also named first-team All-SEC. Adams was also a consensus All-American, and won the inaugural Jet Award given to the nation's best return specialist.

Despite the successful season, Petrino was fired in the offseason. A motorcycle accident on April 1, 2012, led to the discovery that Petrino had covered up an extramarital affair with a member of his staff, and that he had hired the woman in question over several other applicants for the position.

== Personnel ==
=== Coaching staff ===
2011 Arkansas Razorbacks coaching staff
| Head coaches: Head coach – Bobby Petrino; Offensive coaches: Offensive coordinator/quarterbacks – Garrick McGee; Running backs/recruiting coordinator – Tim Horton; Tight ends – Richard Owens; Wide receivers – Kris Cinkovich; Offensive line – Chris Klenakis; Graduate assistant – Richard Owens; Defensive coaches: Defensive coordinator/secondary – Willy Robinson; Linebackers – Reggie Johnson; Defensive tackles – Bobby Allen; Defensive ends – Steve Caldwell; Graduate assistant – Brandon Sharp | Special teams: Special teams coordinator/outside linebackers – John L. Smith; Administrative staff: Athletic director (AD) – Jeff Long; Director of high school relations – Kevin Peoples; Director of on-campus recruiting/eligibility coordinator – Dann Kabala; Director of football operations – Mark Robinson; Strength and conditioning – Jason Veltkamp |

=== Roster ===
2011 Arkansas Razorbacks roster
| Quarterbacks: 8 Tyler Wilson – (redshirt) junior; 9 Jacoby Walker – (redshirt) sophomore; 13 Brandon Allen – freshman; 16 Brian Buehner – (redshirt) sophomore; 17 Brandon Mitchell – junior; -- Davis McElroy – sophomore; Tailbacks: 7 Knile Davis – (redshirt); 27 Chris Milam – sophomore; 20 Ronnie Wingo Jr. – junior; 30 Ronald Watkins – (redshirt) junior; 33 Dennis Johnson – junior; 40 Kody Walker – sophomore; -- Dylan Cruz – sophomore; Fullbacks: 21 Brad Shearin – sophomore; 35 Morgan Linton – (redshirt) freshman; 36 Kiero Small – senior; 37 Brandon Pyle – sophomore; -- Allen Whitlow – sophomore; Wide receivers: 1 Marquel Wade – freshman; 2 Julian Horton – sophomore; 3 Joe Adams – senior; 4 Jarius Wright – senior; 10 Jarvis Hunter – sophomore; 11 Trevor Williams – junior; 15 Keante Minor – freshman; 19 Javontee Herndon – sophomore; 23 De'Anthony Curtis – senior; 81 Kane Whitehurst – freshman; 83 Maudrecus Humphrey – sophomore; 84 Price Holmes – junior; 85 Greg Childs – senior; 89 Brandon Wolford – sophomore; -- Sean Burnette – freshman; -- Alex Cacciarelli – (redshirt) freshman; -- Alex Pastor – sophomore; -- Matthew Showalter – freshman | Tight ends: 6 Colton Miles-Nash Junior; 80 Chris Gragg – junior; 82 Brad Taylor – junior; 87 Austin Tate – sophomore; 88 Garrett Uekman – (redshirt) freshman (Note: Uekman died during the season on November 11. Because he was on the roster for the team's first nine games, he is still listed on the roster.); 89 Andrew Peterson – freshman; -- Alex Voelzke – freshman; -- Austin Weese – freshman; Offensive line: 59 Marcus Danenhauer – (redshirt) freshman; 66 Adam Deacon – freshman; 70 Chris Stringer – sophomore; 71 Jason Peacock – junior; 75 Luke Charpentier – (redshirt) freshman; 76 Tyler Deacon – (redshirt) junior; Offensive tackles: 65 Mitch Smothers – freshman; 68 Austin Beck – freshman; 69 David Hurd – sophomore; 74 Brey Cook – freshman; 79 Grant Freeman – (redshirt) senior; Offensive guards: 56 Blake Gunderson – junior; 67 Alvin Bailey – (redshirt) sophomore; 72 Grant Cook – (redshirt) senior; Centers: 58 Ray Gervasi – (redshirt) freshman; 64 Travis Swanson – sophomore; Defensive ends: 83 Darrick Sullivan – freshman; 43 Tenarius Wright – (redshirt) junior; 50 Grady Ollison – freshman; 86 Trey Flowers – freshman; 91 Jake Bequette – (redshirt) senior; 94 Will Coleman – sophomore; 95 Horace Arkadie – freshman; -- Ben Poeschel – freshman | Defensive tackles: 51 Alfred Davis – (redshirt) junior; 54 Byran Jones – sophomore; 57 Jared Green – senior; 61 Zach Stadther – senior; 63 Devin Bowers – freshman; 92 DeQuinta Jones – junior; 93 DeMarcus Hodge – freshman; 96 Jeremiah Jackson – freshman; 98 Robert Thomas – sophomore; 99 Lavunce Askew – senior; Linebackers: 10 Braylon Mitchell – (redshirt) freshman; 25 Terrell Williams – junior; 31 Jerico Nelson – sophomore; 32 Bret Harris – (redshirt) senior; 34 Jerry Franklin – (redshirt) junior; 35 Ross Rasner – junior; 39 Jarrett Lake – sophomore; 44 Robert Atiga – sophomore; 45 Alonzo Highsmith – junior; 46 Tyler Gilbert – freshman; 47 Matt Marshall – (redshirt) junior; 48 Austin Jones – sophomore; 52 Mitchell Loewen – senior; 55 Brock Haman – freshman; 97 Darrell Kelly-Thomas – freshman; -- Joe Bequette – freshman; Cornerbacks: 6 Isaac Madison – senior; 8 Tevin Mitchel – freshman; 21 Darius Winston – junior; 22 Kelvin Fisher Jr. – freshman; 28 Greg Gatson – senior; 18 Jay Nelson -Junior; 38 Jerry Mitchell – sophomore; -- Dakota Baggett – freshman; -- Kaelon Kellybrew – senior; Safeties: 36 Tramain Thomas – senior; 19 Elton Ford – senior; 13 Seth Armbrust – senior; 14 Eric Bennett – sophomore; 16 Ryan Farr – junior; 22 Darrell Smith – sophomore; 24 Daunte Carr – (redshirt) freshman; 26 Rohan Gaines – freshman; 20 Alan Turner – (redshirt) freshman; 30 Houston Pruitt – sophomore; 31 Jerico Nelson – senior; 49 Brett Weir – freshman | Punters/Kickers: 14 Dylan Breeding – junior; 18 Zach Hocker – sophomore; 43 John Henson – (redshirt) freshman; 47 Cameron Bryan – (redshirt) junior; -- Crawford Sullins – freshman; -- Forbes Harris – (redshirt) freshman; Long snappers: 53 Allan D'Appollonio – freshman; 62 Nick Brewer – (redshirt) junior; -- Drew Gorton – freshman; Terms: Freshman – A player in his first year.; Sophomore – A player in his second year.; Junior – A player in his third year.; Senior – A player in his fourth year.; Redshirt – A player who sat out a previous season. |

== Schedule ==
| Date | Time | Opponent | Rank | Site | TV | Result | Attendance |
|---|---|---|---|---|---|---|---|
| September 3 | 6:00 pm | Missouri State* | No. 15 | Donald W. Reynolds Razorback Stadium; Fayetteville, AR | PPV | W 51–7 | 70,607 |
| September 10 | 6:00 pm | New Mexico* | No. 14 | War Memorial Stadium; Little Rock, AR | ESPNU | W 52–3 | 52,606 |
| September 17 | 6:30 pm | Troy* | No. 14 | Donald W. Reynolds Razorback Stadium; Fayetteville, AR | CSS | W 38–28 | 69,861 |
| September 24 | 2:30 pm | at No. 3 Alabama | No. 14 | Bryant–Denny Stadium; Tuscaloosa, AL | CBS | L 14–38 | 101,821 |
| October 1 | 11:00 am | vs. No. 14 Texas A&M* | No. 18 | Cowboys Stadium; Arlington, TX (rivalry) | ESPN | W 42–38 | 69,838 |
| October 8 | 6:00 pm | No. 15 Auburn | No. 10 | Donald W. Reynolds Razorback Stadium; Fayetteville, AR | ESPN | W 38–14 | 74,191 |
| October 22 | 11:21 am | at Ole Miss | No. 10 | Vaught–Hemingway Stadium; Oxford, MS (rivalry) | SECN | W 29–24 | 57,951 |
| October 29 | 11:21 am | at Vanderbilt | No. 8 | Vanderbilt Stadium; Nashville, TN | SECN | W 31–28 | 33,247 |
| November 5 | 6:15 pm | No. 10 South Carolina^{†} | No. 8 | Donald W. Reynolds Razorback Stadium; Fayetteville, AR | ESPN | W 44–28 | 73,804 |
| November 12 | 5:00 pm | Tennessee | No. 8 | Donald W. Reynolds Razorback Stadium; Fayetteville, AR | ESPN2 | W 49–7 | 72,103 |
| November 19 | 2:30 pm | Mississippi State | No. 6 | War Memorial Stadium; Little Rock, AR | CBS | W 44–17 | 55,761 |
| November 25 | 1:30 pm | at No. 1 LSU | No. 3 | Tiger Stadium; Baton Rouge, LA (rivalry) | CBS | L 17–41 | 93,108 |
| January 6, 2012 | 7:00 pm | vs. No. 11 Kansas State* | No. 7 | Cowboys Stadium; Arlington, TX (Cotton Bowl Classic) | Fox | W 29–16 | 80,956 |
*Non-conference game; ^{†}Homecoming; Rankings from AP Poll released prior to the game; All times are in Central time

== Rankings ==
Ranking movements Legend: ██ Increase in ranking ██ Decrease in ranking
| | Week | | | | | | | | | | | | | | | |
| Poll | Pre | 1 | 2 | 3 | 4 | 5 | 6 | 7 | 8 | 9 | 10 | 11 | 12 | 13 | 14 | Final |
|---|---|---|---|---|---|---|---|---|---|---|---|---|---|---|---|---|
| AP | 15 | 14 | 14 | 14 | 18 | 10 | 10 | 10 | 8 | 8 | 8 | 6 | 3 | 6 | 7 | 5 |
| Coaches | 14 | 13 | 13 | 12 | 18 | 12 | 11 | 10 | 8 | 8 | 8 | 6 | 3 | 10 | 7 | 5 |
| Harris | Not released | | | | | | 11 | 10 | 9 | 8 | 8 | 6 | 3 | 9 | 7 | Not released |
| BCS | Not released | | | | | | | 9 | 10 | 7 | 8 | 6 | 3 | 8 | 6 | Not released |

== Game summaries ==
=== Missouri State ===
| Team | 1 | 2 | 3 | 4 | Total |
|---|---|---|---|---|---|
| Bears | 0 | 0 | 7 | 0 | 7 |
| • No. 15 Razorbacks | 20 | 10 | 14 | 7 | 51 |

- Date: September 3
- Location: Donald W. Reynolds Razorback Stadium, Fayetteville, Arkansas
- Game start: 6:00 p.m. CDT
- Game attendance: 70,607
- Game weather: Partly cloudy, 90 °F (32 °C)
- Television network: PPV

Scoring summary
| 1 | 10:32 | ARK | Jarius Wright 33-yard pass from Tyler Wilson (Zach Hocker kick) | ARK 7–0 |
| 1 | 7:52 | ARK | Joe Adams 61-yard punt return (kick failed) | ARK 13–0 |
| 1 | 0:51 | ARK | Kody Walker 1-yard run (Zach Hocker kick) | ARK 20–0 |
| 2 | 5:01 | ARK | Chris Gragg 3-yard pass from Brandon Mitchell (Zach Hocker kick) | ARK 27–0 |
| 2 | 0:14 | ARK | Zach Hocker 32-yard field goal | ARK 30–0 |
| 3 | 6:17 | ARK | Jarius Wright 29-yard pass from Tyler Wilson (Zach Hocker kick) | ARK 37–0 |
| 3 | 4:15 | ARK | Joe Adams 69-yard punt return (Zach Hocker kick) | ARK 44–0 |
| 3 | 0:45 | MSU | Jermain Saffold 33-yard pass from Kierra Harris (Austin Witmer kick) | ARK 44–7 |
| 4 | 12:20 | ARK | Kody Walker 1-yard run (Zach Hocker kick) | ARK 51–7 |

| Statistics | MOST | ARK |
|---|---|---|
| First downs | 9 | 24 |
| Total yards | 163 | 466 |
| Rushing yards | 84 | 102 |
| Passing yards | 79 | 364 |
| Passing: comp–att–int | 9–18–1 | 28–35–0 |
| Turnovers | 1 | 1 |

| Team | Category | Player | Statistics |
|---|---|---|---|
| Missouri State | Passing | Kierra Harris | 8/14, 70 yards, TD, INT |
| Missouri State | Rushing | Chris Douglas | 18 rushes, 72 yards |
| Missouri State | Receiving | Jermaine Saffold | 1 reception, 33 yards, TD |
| Arkansas | Passing | Tyler Wilson | 18/24, 260 yards, 2 TD |
| Arkansas | Rushing | Ronnie Wingo | 11 rushes, 43 yards |
| Arkansas | Receiving | Jarius Wright | 6 receptions, 108 yards, 2 TD |

=== New Mexico ===
| Team | 1 | 2 | 3 | 4 | Total |
|---|---|---|---|---|---|
| Aggies | 3 | 0 | 0 | 0 | 3 |
| • No. 14 Razorbacks | 14 | 17 | 7 | 14 | 52 |

- Date: September 10
- Location: War Memorial Stadium, Little Rock, Arkansas
- Game start: 6:00 p.m. CDT
- Game attendance: 52,606
- Game weather: Partly cloudy, 81 °F (27 °C)
- Television network: ESPNU

Scoring summary
| 1 | 13:03 | ARK | Jarius Wright 12-yard pass from Tyler Wilson (Zach Hocker kick) | ARK 7–0 |
| 1 | 4:57 | NM | James Aho 47-yard field goal | ARK 7–3 |
| 1 | 4:42 | ARK | Marquel Wade 85-yard kickoff return (Zach Hocker kick) | ARK 14–3 |
| 2 | 5:38 | ARK | Zach Hocker 24-yard field goal | ARK 17–3 |
| 2 | 2:14 | ARK | Kody Walker 1-yard run (Zach Hocker kick) | ARK 24–3 |
| 2 | 0:17 | ARK | Tyler Wilson 7-yard run (Zach Hocker kick) | ARK 31–3 |
| 3 | 9:42 | ARK | Kody Walker 1-yard run (Zach Hocker kick) | ARK 38–3 |
| 4 | 12:00 | ARK | Cobi Hamilton 54-yard pass from Tyler Wilson (Zach Hocker kick) | ARK 45–3 |
| 4 | 4:28 | ARK | Brandon Mitchell 14-yard run (Zach Hocker kick) | ARK 52–3 |

| Statistics | NMSU | ARK |
|---|---|---|
| First downs | 15 | 34 |
| Total yards | 297 | 632 |
| Rushing yards | 95 | 259 |
| Passing yards | 202 | 373 |
| Passing: comp–att–int | 22–38–0 | 26–39–1 |
| Turnovers | 0 | 4 |

| Team | Category | Player | Statistics |
|---|---|---|---|
| New Mexico State | Passing | Tarean Austin | 15/28, 162 yards |
| New Mexico State | Rushing | Tarean Austin | 7 rushes, 31 yards |
| New Mexico State | Receiving | Lamaar Thomas | 5 receptions, 60 yards |
| Arkansas | Passing | Tyler Wilson | 18/26, 259 yards, TD, INT |
| Arkansas | Rushing | Ronnie Wingo | 12 rushes, 73 yards |
| Arkansas | Receiving | Cobi Hamilton | 5 receptions, 132 yards, TD |

=== Troy ===
| Team | 1 | 2 | 3 | 4 | Total |
|---|---|---|---|---|---|
| Trojans | 0 | 7 | 14 | 7 | 28 |
| • No. 14 Razorbacks | 14 | 10 | 7 | 7 | 38 |

- Date: September 17
- Location: Donald W. Reynolds Razorback Stadium, Fayetteville, Arkansas
- Game start: 6:30 p.m. CDT
- Game attendance: 69,861
- Game weather: Partly cloudy, 63 °F (17 °C)
- Television network: CSS

Scoring summary
| 1 | 13:09 | ARK | Ronnie Wingo Jr. 22-yard run (Zach Hocker kick) | ARK 7–0 |
| 1 | 6:00 | ARK | Ronnie Wingo Jr. 21-yard run (Zach Hocker kick) | ARK 14–0 |
| 2 | 13:56 | ARK | Kody Walker 3-yard run (Zach Hocker kick) | ARK 21–0 |
| 2 | 6:41 | ARK | Zach Hocker 22-yard field goal | ARK 24–0 |
| 2 | 0:07 | TROY | Eric Thomas 3-yard pass from Corey Robinson (Michael Taylor kick) | ARK 24–7 |
| 3 | 7:28 | ARK | Ronnie Wingo Jr. 6-yard pass from Tyler Wilson (Zach Hocker kick) | ARK 31–7 |
| 3 | 6:40 | TROY | Justin Albert 32-yard pass from Corey Robinson (Michael Taylor kick) | ARK 31–14 |
| 3 | 6:12 | TROY | LaDarrius Madden 53-yard interception return (Michael Taylor kick) | ARK 31–21 |
| 4 | 14:09 | ARK | Joe Adams 56-yard pass from Tyler Wilson (Zach Hocker kick) | ARK 38–21 |
| 4 | 0:28 | TROY | Eric Thomas 24-yard pass from Corey Robinson (Michael Taylor kick) | ARK 38–28 |

| Statistics | TROY | ARK |
|---|---|---|
| First downs | 22 | 26 |
| Total yards | 457 | 454 |
| Rushing yards | 84 | 151 |
| Passing yards | 373 | 303 |
| Passing: comp–att–int | 36–63–1 | 23–36–1 |
| Turnovers | 1 | 3 |

| Team | Category | Player | Statistics |
|---|---|---|---|
| Troy | Passing | Corey Robinson | 36/63, 373 yards, 3 TD, INT |
| Troy | Rushing | Corey Robinson | 3 rushes, 33 yards |
| Troy | Receiving | Stanley Arukwe | 4 receptions, 84 yards |
| Arkansas | Passing | Tyler Wilson | 23/36, 303 yards, 2 TD, INT |
| Arkansas | Rushing | Ronnie Wingo | 20 rushes, 109 yards, 2 TD |
| Arkansas | Receiving | Joe Adams | 8 receptions, 109 yards, TD |

=== At No. 3 Alabama ===
| Team | 1 | 2 | 3 | 4 | Total |
|---|---|---|---|---|---|
| No. 14 Razorbacks | 7 | 0 | 7 | 0 | 14 |
| • No. 3 Crimson Tide | 7 | 10 | 21 | 0 | 38 |

- Date: September 24
- Location: Bryant–Denny Stadium, Tuscaloosa, Alabama
- Game start: 2:30 p.m. CDT
- Game attendance: 101,821
- Game weather: Sunny, 80 °F (27 °C)
- Referee: Hubert Owens
- TV announcers (CBS): Verne Lundquist, Gary Danielson, and Tracy Wolfson

| Statistics | ARK | ALA |
|---|---|---|
| First downs | 14 | 16 |
| Total yards | 226 | 397 |
| Rushing yards | 17 | 197 |
| Passing yards | 209 | 200 |
| Passing: comp–att–int | 24–40–2 | 15–20–0 |
| Turnovers | 2 | 0 |

| Team | Category | Player | Statistics |
|---|---|---|---|
| Arkansas | Passing | Tyler Wilson | 22/35, 185 yards, 2 TD, INT |
| Arkansas | Rushing | Ronnie Wingo | 11 rushes, 35 yards |
| Arkansas | Receiving | Ronnie Wingo | 3 receptions, 43 yards |
| Alabama | Passing | A. J. McCarron | 15/20, 200 yards, 2 TD |
| Alabama | Rushing | Trent Richardson | 17 rushes, 126 yards |
| Alabama | Receiving | Trent Richardson | 3 receptions, 85 yards, TD |

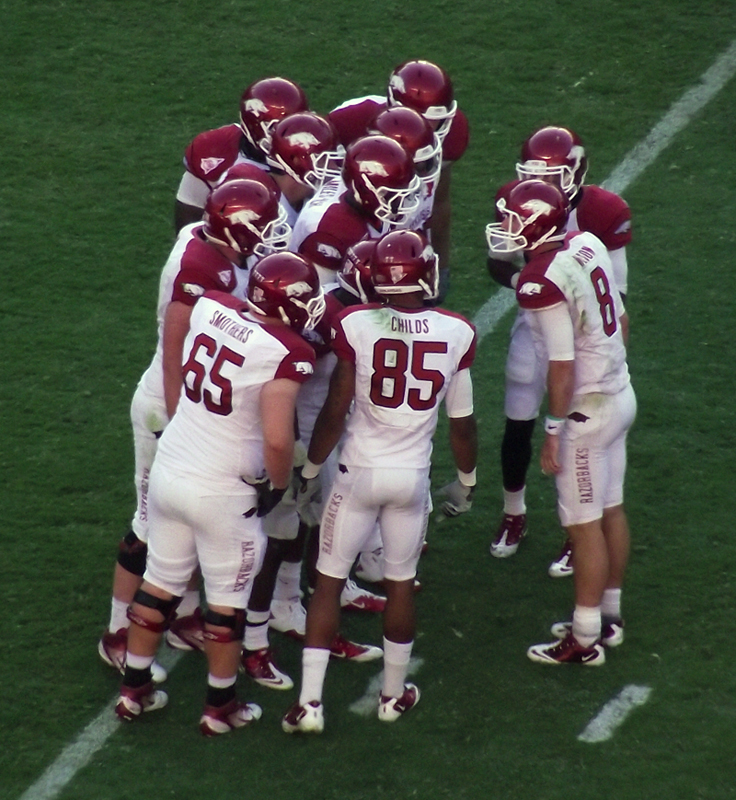
The Arkansas offense in the huddle during their game against Alabama.

=== Vs. No. 14 Texas A&M ===
| Team | 1 | 2 | 3 | 4 | Total |
|---|---|---|---|---|---|
| No. 14 Aggies | 14 | 21 | 0 | 3 | 38 |
| • No. 18 Razorbacks | 7 | 10 | 10 | 15 | 42 |

- Date: October 1
- Location: Cowboys Stadium, Arlington, Texas
- Game start: 11:00 a.m. CDT
- Game attendance: 69,838
- Game weather: None (retractable roof closed)
- Television network: ESPN

Scoring summary
| 1 | 12:48 | A&M | Christine Michael 48-yard run (Randy Bullock kick) | A&M 7–0 |
| 1 | 8:45 | A&M | Christine Michael 4-yard run (Randy Bullock kick) | A&M 14–0 |
| 1 | 2:26 | ARK | Jarius Wright 68-yard pass from Tyler Wilson (Zach Hocker kick) | A&M 14–7 |
| 2 | 10:53 | A&M | Cyrus Gray 1-yard run (Randy Bullock kick) | A&M 21–7 |
| 2 | 9:09 | ARK | Broderick Green 1-yard run (Zach Hocker kick) | A&M 21–14 |
| 2 | 7:05 | A&M | Christine Michael 29-yard run (Randy Bullock kick) | A&M 28–14 |
| 2 | 3:05 | ARK | Zach Hocker 26-yard field goal | A&M 28–17 |
| 2 | 0:09 | A&M | Cyrus Gray 4-yard run (Randy Bullock kick) | A&M 35–17 |
| 3 | 11:44 | ARK | Zach Hocker 32-yard field goal | A&M 35–20 |
| 3 | 7:29 | ARK | Ronnie Wingo Jr. 13-yard pass from Tyler Wilson (Zach Hocker kick) | A&M 35–27 |
| 4 | 11:00 | ARK | Jarius Wright recovered fumble in end zone (Tyler Wilson run) | Tied 35–35 |
| 4 | 4:22 | A&M | Randy Bullock 23-yard field goal | A&M 38–35 |
| 4 | 1:41 | ARK | Broderick Green 3-yard run (Zach Hocker kick) | ARK 42–38 |

| Statistics | TAMU | ARK |
|---|---|---|
| First downs | 30 | 28 |
| Total yards | 628 | 581 |
| Rushing yards | 381 | 71 |
| Passing yards | 247 | 510 |
| Passing: comp–att–int | 25–35–1 | 30–51–0 |
| Turnovers | 2 | 0 |

| Team | Category | Player | Statistics |
|---|---|---|---|
| Texas A&M | Passing | Ryan Tannehill | 25/35, 247 yards, INT |
| Texas A&M | Rushing | Christine Michael | 32 rushes, 230 yards, 3 TD |
| Texas A&M | Receiving | Ryan Swope | 5 receptions, 92 yards |
| Arkansas | Passing | Tyler Wilson | 30/51, 510 yards, 3 TD |
| Arkansas | Rushing | Dennis Johnson | 8 rushes, 54 yards |
| Arkansas | Receiving | Jarius Wright | 13 receptions, 281 yards, 2 TD |

=== No. 15 Auburn ===
| Team | 1 | 2 | 3 | 4 | Total |
|---|---|---|---|---|---|
| No. 15 Tigers | 14 | 0 | 0 | 0 | 14 |
| • No. 10 Razorbacks | 7 | 14 | 7 | 10 | 38 |

- Date: October 8
- Location: Donald W. Reynolds Razorback Stadium, Fayetteville, Arkansas
- Game start: 6:00 p.m. CDT
- Game attendance: 74,191
- Game weather: Sunny, 78 °F (26 °C)
- Referee: Ken Williamson
- TV announcers (ESPN): Brad Nessler, Todd Blackledge, and Holly Rowe

Scoring summary
| 1 | 9:56 | AUB | Michael Dyer 55-yard run (Cody Parkey kick) | AUB 7–0 |
| 1 | 6:53 | ARK | Broderick Green 6-yard run (Zach Hocker kick) | Tied 7–7 |
| 1 | 0:02 | AUB | Kiehl Frazier 7-yard run (Cody Parkey kick) | AUB 14–7 |
| 2 | 9:36 | ARK | Tyler Wilson 1-yard run (Zach Hocker kick) | Tied 14–14 |
| 2 | 4:23 | ARK | Jarius Wright 5-yard pass from Tyler Wilson (Zach Hocker kick) | ARK 21–14 |
| 3 | 7:43 | ARK | Joe Adams 92-yard run (Zach Hocker kick) | ARK 28–14 |
| 4 | 12:10 | ARK | Zach Hocker 36-yard field goal | ARK 31–14 |
| 4 | 5:50 | ARK | Dennis Johnson 18-yard pass from Tyler Wilson (Zach Hocker kick) | ARK 38–14 |

| Statistics | AUB | ARK |
|---|---|---|
| First downs | | |
| Total yards | | |
| Rushing yards | | |
| Passing yards | | |
| Passing: comp–att–int | | |
| Turnovers | | |

| Team | Category | Player | Statistics |
|---|---|---|---|
| Auburn | Passing | | |
| Auburn | Rushing | | |
| Auburn | Receiving | | |
| Arkansas | Passing | | |
| Arkansas | Rushing | | |
| Arkansas | Receiving | | |

=== At Ole Miss ===
| Team | 1 | 2 | 3 | 4 | Total |
|---|---|---|---|---|---|
| • No. 10 Razorbacks | 0 | 7 | 19 | 3 | 29 |
| Rebels | 3 | 14 | 0 | 7 | 24 |

- Date: October 22
- Location: Vaught–Hemingway Stadium, Oxford, Mississippi
- Game start: 11:21 a.m. CDT
- Game attendance: 57,951
- Game weather: Fair, 55 °F (13 °C)
- Television network: SECN

Scoring summary
| 1 | 3:43 | MISS | Bryson Rose 43-yard field goal | MISS 3–0 |
| 2 | 14:50 | MISS | Donte Moncrief 31-yard pass from Randall Mackey (Bryson Rose kick) | MISS 10–0 |
| 2 | 6:42 | MISS | Randall Mackey 3-yard run (Bryson Rose kick) | MISS 17–0 |
| 2 | 5:11 | ARK | Dennis Johnson 52-yard run (Zach Hocker kick) | MISS 17–7 |
| 3 | 11:55 | ARK | Zach Hocker 33-yard field goal | MISS 17–10 |
| 3 | 6:48 | ARK | Tyler Wilson 1-yard run (Zach Hocker kick) | Tied 17–17 |
| 3 | 3:22 | ARK | Tyler Wilson 1-yard run (Zach Hocker kick) | ARK 24–17 |
| 3 | 0:14 | ARK | Safety, Jeff Scott tackled by Jerry Franklin in end zone | ARK 26–17 |
| 4 | 11:31 | ARK | Zach Hocker 23-yard field goal | ARK 29–17 |
| 4 | 1:23 | MISS | Donte Moncrief 4-yard pass from Randall Mackey (Bryson Rose kick) | ARK 29–24 |

| Statistics | ARK | MISS |
|---|---|---|
| First downs | | |
| Total yards | | |
| Rushing yards | | |
| Passing yards | | |
| Passing: comp–att–int | | |
| Turnovers | | |

| Team | Category | Player | Statistics |
|---|---|---|---|
| Arkansas | Passing | | |
| Arkansas | Rushing | | |
| Arkansas | Receiving | | |
| Ole Miss | Passing | | |
| Ole Miss | Rushing | | |
| Ole Miss | Receiving | | |

=== At Vanderbilt ===
| Team | 1 | 2 | 3 | 4 | Total |
|---|---|---|---|---|---|
| • No. 8 Razorbacks | 7 | 7 | 6 | 11 | 31 |
| Commodores | 7 | 14 | 7 | 0 | 28 |

- Date: October 29
- Location: Vanderbilt Stadium, Nashville, Tennessee
- Game start: 11:00 a.m. CDT
- Game attendance: 33,247
- Game weather: Clear, 40 °F (4 °C)
- Referee: Marc Curles
- TV announcers (SECN): Dave Neal, Andre Ware, and Cara Capuano

Scoring summary
| 1 | 9:24 | VAN | Jordan Matthews 21-yard pass from Jordan Rodgers (Carey Spear kick) | VAN 7–0 |
| 1 | 4:02 | ARK | Brandon Mitchell 4-yard run (Zach Hocker kick) | Tied 7–7 |
| 2 | 13:03 | VAN | Jordan Rodgers 19-yard run (Carey Spear kick) | VAN 14–7 |
| 2 | 1:39 | VAN | Jordan Rodgers 3-yard run (Carey Spear kick) | VAN 21–7 |
| 2 | 0:05 | ARK | Jarius Wright 11-yard pass from Tyler Wilson (Zach Hocker kick) | VAN 21–14 |
| 3 | 11:39 | ARK | Zach Hocker 36-yard field goal | VAN 21–17 |
| 3 | 1:39 | VAN | Jordan Rodgers 3-yard run (Carey Spear kick) | VAN 28–17 |
| 3 | 1:05 | ARK | Zach Hocker 50-yard field goal | VAN 28–20 |
| 4 | 13:25 | ARK | Jerry Franklin 94-yard fumble return (Tyler Wilson to Jarius Wright pass) | Tied 28–28 |
| 4 | 6:53 | ARK | Zach Hocker 42-yard field goal | ARK 31–28 |

| Statistics | ARK | VAN |
|---|---|---|
| First downs | | |
| Total yards | | |
| Rushing yards | | |
| Passing yards | | |
| Passing: comp–att–int | | |
| Turnovers | | |

| Team | Category | Player | Statistics |
|---|---|---|---|
| Arkansas | Passing | | |
| Arkansas | Rushing | | |
| Arkansas | Receiving | | |
| Vanderbilt | Passing | | |
| Vanderbilt | Rushing | | |
| Vanderbilt | Receiving | | |

=== No. 10 South Carolina ===
| Team | 1 | 2 | 3 | 4 | Total |
|---|---|---|---|---|---|
| No. 10 Gamecocks | 7 | 7 | 7 | 7 | 28 |
| • No. 8 Razorbacks | 10 | 14 | 6 | 14 | 44 |

- Date: November 5
- Location: Razorback Stadium, Fayetteville, Arkansas
- Game start: 6:15 p.m. CDT
- Game attendance: 73,804
- Game weather: Scattered clouds, 54 °F (12 °C)
- Television network: ESPN

Scoring summary
| 1 | 11:33 | ARK | Zach Hocker 44-yard field goal | ARK 3–0 |
| 1 | 2:28 | SCAR | Brandon Wilds 4-yard run (Jay Wooten kick) | SCAR 7–3 |
| 1 | 2:13 | ARK | Dennis Johnson 98-yard kickoff return (Zach Hocker kick) | ARK 10–7 |
| 2 | 13:04 | SCAR | Devin Taylor 48-yard interception return (Jay Wooten kick) | SCAR 14–10 |
| 2 | 12:49 | ARK | Jarius Wright 68-yard pass from Tyler Wilson (Zach Hocker kick) | ARK 17–14 |
| 2 | 4:11 | ARK | Jarius Wright 16-yard pass from Tyler Wilson (Zach Hocker kick) | ARK 24–14 |
| 3 | 10:50 | SCAR | Connor Shaw 9-yard run (Jay Wooten kick) | ARK 24–21 |
| 3 | 7:47 | ARK | Zach Hocker 21-yard field goal | ARK 27–21 |
| 3 | 1:17 | ARK | Zach Hocker 25-yard field goal | ARK 30–21 |
| 4 | 10:30 | SCAR | Connor Shaw 1-yard run (Jay Wooten kick) | ARK 30–28 |
| 4 | 8:09 | ARK | Ronnie Wingo Jr. 4-yard run (Zach Hocker kick) | ARK 37–28 |
| 4 | 4:07 | ARK | Broderick Green 1-yard run (Zach Hocker kick) |

| Statistics | SCAR | ARK |
|---|---|---|
| First downs | | |
| Total yards | | |
| Rushing yards | | |
| Passing yards | | |
| Passing: comp–att–int | | |
| Turnovers | | |

| Team | Category | Player | Statistics |
|---|---|---|---|
| South Carolina | Passing | | |
| South Carolina | Rushing | | |
| South Carolina | Receiving | | |
| Arkansas | Passing | | |
| Arkansas | Rushing | | |
| Arkansas | Receiving | | |

=== Tennessee ===
| Team | 1 | 2 | 3 | 4 | Total |
|---|---|---|---|---|---|
| Volunteers | 0 | 7 | 0 | 0 | 7 |
| • No. 8 Razorbacks | 14 | 7 | 14 | 14 | 49 |

- Date: November 12
- Location: Razorback Stadium, Fayetteville, Arkansas
- Game start: 5:00 p.m. CST
- Game attendance: 72,103
- Game weather: Partly cloudy, 61 °F (16 °C)
- Television network: ESPN2

| Statistics | TENN | ARK |
|---|---|---|
| First downs | | |
| Total yards | | |
| Rushing yards | | |
| Passing yards | | |
| Passing: comp–att–int | | |
| Turnovers | | |

| Team | Category | Player | Statistics |
|---|---|---|---|
| Tennessee | Passing | | |
| Tennessee | Rushing | | |
| Tennessee | Receiving | | |
| Arkansas | Passing | | |
| Arkansas | Rushing | | |
| Arkansas | Receiving | | |

=== Mississippi State ===
| Team | 1 | 2 | 3 | 4 | Total |
|---|---|---|---|---|---|
| Bulldogs | 3 | 7 | 0 | 7 | 17 |
| • No. 6 Razorbacks | 14 | 10 | 10 | 10 | 44 |

- Date: November 19
- Location: War Memorial Stadium, Little Rock, Arkansas
- Game start: 2:30 p.m. CST
- Game attendance: 55,761
- Game weather: Cloudy, 66 °F (19 °C)
- Television network: CBS

| Statistics | MSST | ARK |
|---|---|---|
| First downs | | |
| Total yards | | |
| Rushing yards | | |
| Passing yards | | |
| Passing: comp–att–int | | |
| Turnovers | | |

| Team | Category | Player | Statistics |
|---|---|---|---|
| Mississippi State | Passing | | |
| Mississippi State | Rushing | | |
| Mississippi State | Receiving | | |
| Arkansas | Passing | | |
| Arkansas | Rushing | | |
| Arkansas | Receiving | | |

=== At No. 1 LSU ===
| Team | 1 | 2 | 3 | 4 | Total |
|---|---|---|---|---|---|
| No. 3 Razorbacks | 0 | 14 | 3 | 0 | 17 |
| • No. 1 Tigers | 0 | 21 | 3 | 17 | 41 |

- Date: November 25
- Location: Tiger Stadium, Baton Rouge, Louisiana
- Game start: 1:30 p.m. CST
- Game attendance: 93,108
- Game weather: 75 °F (24 °C)
- Television network: CBS

| Statistics | ARK | LSU |
|---|---|---|
| First downs | | |
| Total yards | | |
| Rushing yards | | |
| Passing yards | | |
| Passing: comp–att–int | | |
| Turnovers | | |

| Team | Category | Player | Statistics |
|---|---|---|---|
| Arkansas | Passing | | |
| Arkansas | Rushing | | |
| Arkansas | Receiving | | |
| LSU | Passing | | |
| LSU | Rushing | | |
| LSU | Receiving | | |

=== Vs. No. 11 Kansas State (Cotton Bowl Classic) ===
| Team | 1 | 2 | 3 | 4 | Total |
|---|---|---|---|---|---|
| No. 11 Wildcats | 0 | 9 | 7 | 0 | 16 |
| • No. 7 Razorbacks | 3 | 16 | 7 | 3 | 29 |

- Date: January 6, 2012
- Location: Cowboys Stadium, Arlington, Texas
- Game start: 7:00 p.m. CST
- Game attendance: 80,956
- Game weather: 72 °F (22 °C) (retractable roof open)
- Referee: John O’Neill
- TV announcers (Fox): Gus Johnson, Charles Davis, Tim Brewster, and Daryl Johnston

| Statistics | KSU | ARK |
|---|---|---|
| First downs | | |
| Total yards | | |
| Rushing yards | | |
| Passing yards | | |
| Passing: comp–att–int | | |
| Turnovers | | |

| Team | Category | Player | Statistics |
|---|---|---|---|
| Kansas State | Passing | | |
| Kansas State | Rushing | | |
| Kansas State | Receiving | | |
| Arkansas | Passing | | |
| Arkansas | Rushing | | |
| Arkansas | Receiving | | |
