= Tyler Wilson (American football) =

American football player (born 1989)

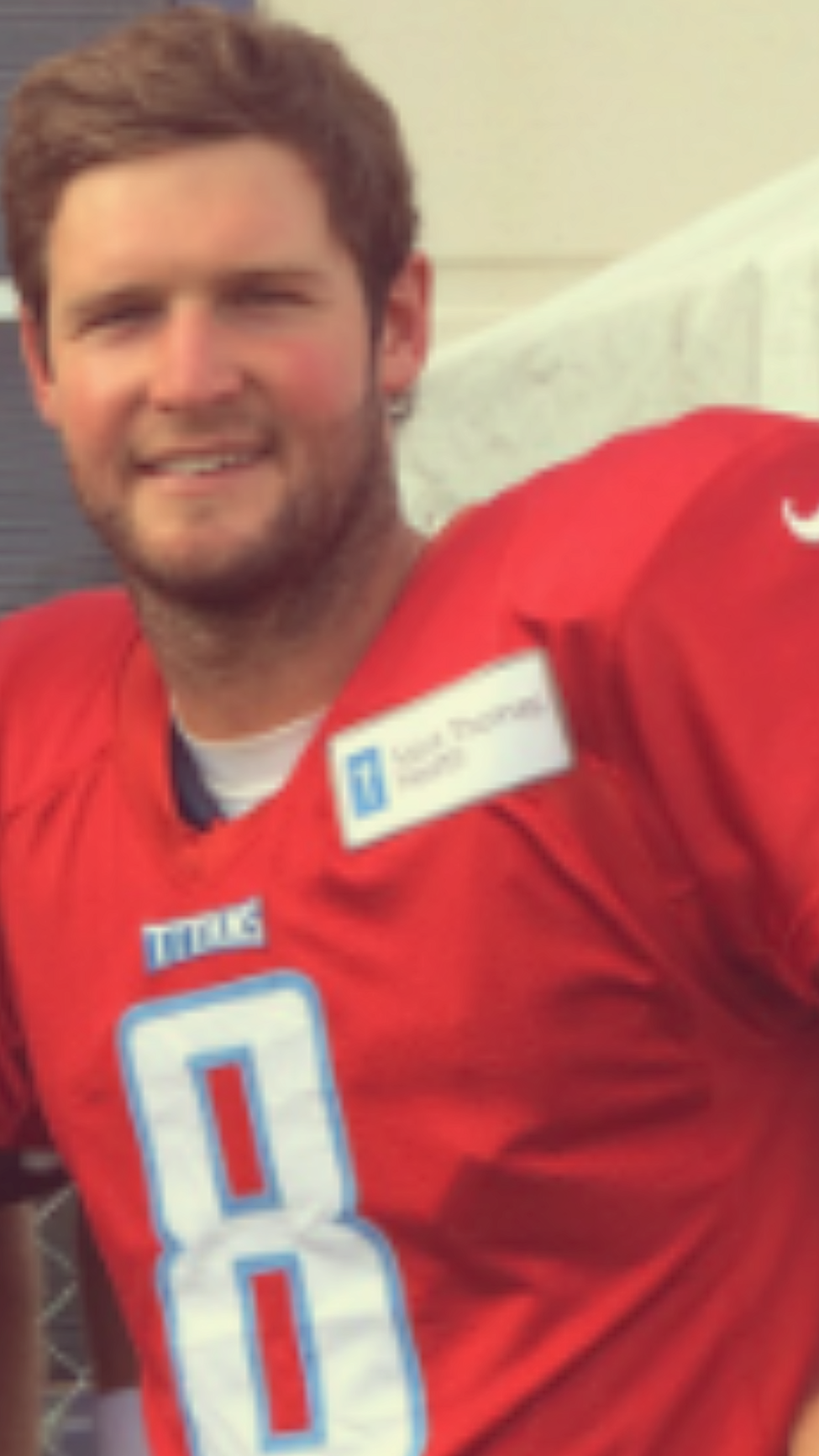
- Wilson at Tennessee Titans training camp in 2014

No. 8, 9
- Position: Quarterback

Personal information
- Born: August 16, 1989 (age 37); Fort Smith, Arkansas, U.S.
- Listed height: 6 ft 2 in (1.88 m)
- Listed weight: 215 lb (98 kg)

Career information
- High school: Greenwood (AR)
- College: Arkansas (2008–2012)
- NFL draft: 2013: 4th round, 112th overall pick

Career history
- Oakland Raiders (2013); Tennessee Titans (2013); Cincinnati Bengals (2014)*
- * Offseason or practice squad member only

Awards and highlights
- First-team All-SEC (2011)
- Stats at Pro Football Reference

James Tyler Wilson (born August 16, 1989) is an American former professional football quarterback. He played college football at Arkansas and is the school's all-time passing yards leader.. He was selected by the Oakland Raiders in the fourth round of the 2013 NFL draft. Wilson was also a member of the Tennessee Titans and Cincinnati Bengals.

== Early life ==
Wilson graduated in 2008 from Greenwood High School in Greenwood, Arkansas. Rivals.com ranked Wilson the no. 9 pro-style quarterback in the nation and no. 5 overall player in Arkansas. ESPN rated Wilson as the eighth best quarterback recruit in the U.S.

Wilson led Greenwood to its third straight state championship, second as the starting quarterback. In his two years as starter for the Greenwood Bulldogs, Wilson threw for over 8,000 yards with 93 touchdown passes. Wilson won the 2007 Landers Award as the state of Arkansas' top football player. He was selected as an all-conference and all-state performer. Also an outstanding baseball player, Wilson was named the Gatorade Player of the Year for 2007–08. He finished his senior campaign 11-0 and had a 1.42 ERA while striking out 92 batters in 64 innings. He batted .415 with four home runs, 14 doubles, and 30 RBI. He had a career record on the mound of 32–9 with 386 strike outs in 251.1 innings.

College recruiting
Name	Hometown	School	Height	Weight	40^{‡}	Commit date
Tyler Wilson; QB	Greenwood, Arkansas	Greenwood High School	6 ft 2 in (1.88 m)	185 lb (84 kg)	4.75	Dec 17, 2007
Tyler Wilson; QB	Recruit ratings: Scout: Rivals: (82)					
Overall recruit ranking: Scout: 35th (QB) Rivals: 9th (QB), 5th (AR) ESPN: 8th (QB), 81st (OVR)
‡ Refers to 40-yard dash; Note: In many cases, Scout, Rivals, 247Sports, On3, and ESPN may conflict in their listings of height, weight and 40 time.; In these cases, the average was taken. ESPN grades are on a 100-point scale.; Sources: "2008 Team Ranking". Rivals.com.

== College career ==
While attending the University of Arkansas, Wilson was a member of the Arkansas Razorbacks football team from 2008 to 2012. Finalizing his career at Arkansas Wilson set 29 school passing records. A recreation and sports management major, Wilson graduated from Arkansas in December 2012.

=== 2008–2010 ===
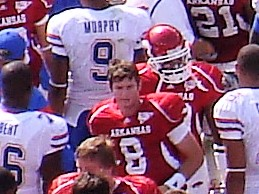
Wilson in 2008

Wilson played in two games as a true freshman in 2008, completing 11-of-22 passes for 69 yards and a touchdown with two interceptions. Those two games were in consecutive weeks against Alabama and Texas. He missed the remainder of the season due to an illness and received a medical redshirt.

In five games for Arkansas in 2009 as a redshirt freshman, Wilson finished the season 22-for-36 with 218 yards and two touchdowns with two interceptions. He threw for a total of 138 yards on 13-of-19 passing and both touchdowns with an interception in the season opener against Missouri State. At Alabama, he completed 4-of-6 passes for 31 yards. His other action came in a victory over Eastern Michigan where he went 5-of-11 for 49 yards with an interception.

Wilson played in six games for the Razorbacks in his redshirt sophomore season of 2010. He threw for 453 yards on 34-of-51 passing and four touchdowns with three interceptions. Wilson saw extensive playing time in a game at Auburn after Ryan Mallett suffered a concussion. He threw for 332 yards on 25-of-34 passing and four touchdowns with two interceptions in little over half the game. Wilson also saw action in a win against Ole Miss. He threw for 71 yards on 3-of-5 passing while managing the offensive effectively. According to Scout.com, Wilson was rated as the No. 5 quarterback prospect for the 2012 NFL draft. ESPN's Todd Blackledge listed Wilson as the No. 1 replacement player to watch for the 2011 season.

=== 2011 ===
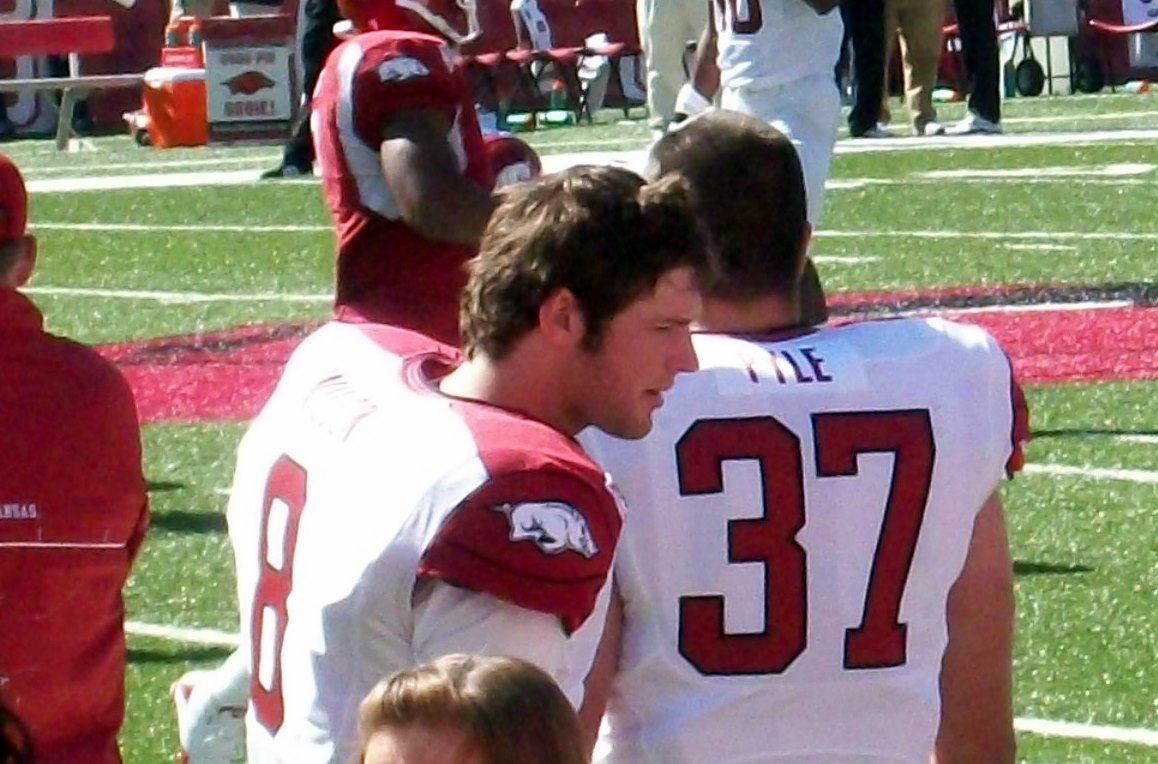
Wilson in 2011

On August 25, 2011, Arkansas head coach Bobby Petrino named redshirt junior Wilson starting quarterback. In his first season as a starter, A team captain who started all 13 games, Wilson led Arkansas to an 11–2 record, which tied the school's single-season record for wins and the third season in school history to reach that number of wins. Wilson also became the first quarterback in Arkansas history to be named first-team All-SEC. Wilson finished the 2011 season 277-for-438 for 3,638 yards, 24 touchdowns, and six interceptions and became just the second quarterback in school history with over 3,000 single-season passing yards. He was a finalist for the Manning Award and Johnny Unitas Golden Arm Award and semifinalist for the Davey O'Brien Award.

In the season-opening 51–7 win over Missouri State, Wilson completed 18 of 24 passes for 261 yards and two touchdowns and followed that game with another outstanding offensive performance: 18-of-26 passing for 259 yards and one passing touchdown in addition to 48 rushing yards on five carries, in a 52–3 victory over New Mexico. Wilson passed for 303 yards and two touchdowns while completing 23 of 36 passes in the 38–28 win over Troy.

Wilson was named SEC co-Offensive Player of the Week after leading Arkansas to a 42–38 upset of No. 14 Texas A&M at Cowboys Stadium. Rallying Arkansas from an 18-point halftime deficit, Wilson broke the Arkansas school record with 510 passing yards in completing 30 of 51 passes for three touchdowns. This was the fifth 500-yard passing game in SEC history and the first since 2001.

In another big comeback victory, Wilson completed 13 of 28 passes for 232 yards and rushed for two touchdowns in a 29–24 win at Ole Miss; Arkansas trailed by as many as 17. He completed 27 of 43 passes for 316 yards and one touchdown in a 31–28 win at Vanderbilt rallying from a 14-point deficit.

Wilson made a career-long-tying 68-yard pass in the 44–28 win vs. No. 10 South Carolina and passed for three touchdowns in a 49–7 win vs. Tennessee. Wilson was named SEC Offensive Player of the Week for completing a school record 32 passes, including three touchdowns, in the 44–17 victory vs. Mississippi State.

For completing 20 of 31 passes for 216 yards and two touchdowns, Wilson was Offensive MVP of the Cotton Bowl, a 29–16 win for No. 6 Arkansas over No. 9 Kansas State. Arkansas finished the 2011 season ranked No. 5 in the AP Poll, the program's first top-five finish since 1977.

=== 2012 ===
Wilson had 11 starts as a senior in 2012. He finished the season 249-of-401 passing for 3,387 yards and 21 touchdowns. He broke the Arkansas single-season record with five 350-yard pass games and was a finalist for the Johnny Unitas Golden Arm Award and the SEC Community Service Team.

With an average of 307.9 passing yards, Wilson led the SEC and ranked 10th in Division I FBS in passing yards per game and ranked second in the conference and 15th in Division I FBS with an average of 308.5 yards of total offense per game.

In the season-opening 49–24 win over Jacksonville State, Wilson completed 19 of 27 passes for 367 passing yards and three touchdowns.

In a 49–7 victory over Kentucky, Wilson tied the Arkansas single-game record with five passing touchdowns and tied for third for single-game touchdowns. He broke the Arkansas single-game record for total plays with 62 and pass attempts (59) in a 58–10 loss to Texas A&M.

He was 11-of-20 passing for 196 yards and two touchdowns in the first half vs. Louisiana–Monroe before being forced to sit out the second half due to injury; he would miss the next week's game against Alabama as well.

In the 38–20 loss to No. 12 South Carolina, Wilson broke the Arkansas record for career completions. He ended his career with a 31-of-52 passing performance for 359 yards, breaking the UA career passing yards record, and one touchdown while rushing for a season-high 38 yards on nine carries in a 20–13 loss to No. 8 LSU. Wilson had a 4–7 record as a starter in 2012, despite Arkansas beginning the season ranked in the top 10 of the AP Poll.

Following the season he was selected to play in the Senior Bowl, where he was 8-of-11 passing, leading the South Team in completions, for 40 yards as the South earned a 21–16 win.

=== College statistics ===
Season	Team	Games		Passing							
Season	Team	GP	GS	Cmp	Att	Pct	Yds	Avg	TD	Int	Rtg
2008	Arkansas	2	0	11	22	50.0	69	3.1	1	2	73.2
2009	Arkansas	5	0	22	36	61.1	218	6.1	2	2	119.2
2010	Arkansas	6	0	34	51	66.7	453	8.9	4	3	155.4
2011	Arkansas	13	13	277	438	63.2	3,638	8.3	24	6	148.4
2012	Arkansas	11	11	249	401	62.1	3,387	8.4	21	13	143.8
Career		37	24	593	948	62.6	7,765	8.2	52	26	144.0

== Professional career ==
=== Pre-draft ===
Before the 2012 college football season, Wilson was projected as the No. 1 pick in the 2013 NFL draft by Sports Illustrated.

Pre-draft measurables
Height	Weight	Arm length	Hand span	Wingspan	40-yard dash	10-yard split	20-yard split	20-yard shuttle	Three-cone drill	Vertical jump	Broad jump
6 ft 2 1/8 in (1.88 m)	215 lb (98 kg)	31 3/8 in (0.80 m)	8 3/4 in (0.22 m)	6 ft 2 1/4 in (1.89 m)	4.95 s	1.71 s	2.87 s	4.39 s	7.22 s	28.5 in (0.72 m)	9 ft 4 in (2.84 m)
All values from NFL Combine

=== Oakland Raiders ===
Despite setting a number of school records in his senior season, Wilson's draft status fell. He was taken in the fourth round by the Oakland Raiders with the 112th pick in the 2013 NFL draft. After a promising early start in Oakland he was projected to compete with Raiders quarterbacks Matt Flynn and Terrelle Pryor for playing time in 2013.

Wilson was the highest drafted member of the 2013 NFL class to not make his team's opening day roster after dropping to 4th string behind Matt McGloin, but was signed to the Raiders' practice squad a day later. Mid-season he was activated onto the Raiders active roster and served as back-up for several weeks but did not receive any playing time.

=== Tennessee Titans ===
On December 17, 2013, Wilson was signed by the Tennessee Titans. On August 6, 2014, Wilson was released.

=== Cincinnati Bengals ===
On August 9, 2014, Wilson was signed by the Cincinnati Bengals. He appeared in two preseason games and completed a combined 10 of 18 passes with 1 passing touchdown and accounting for another scoring drive. Despite having some success in short order, he was waived during final cuts on August 29, 2014.
