= 2012 Cotton Bowl Classic =

2012 AT&T Cotton Bowl Classic
- 76th Cotton Bowl Classic
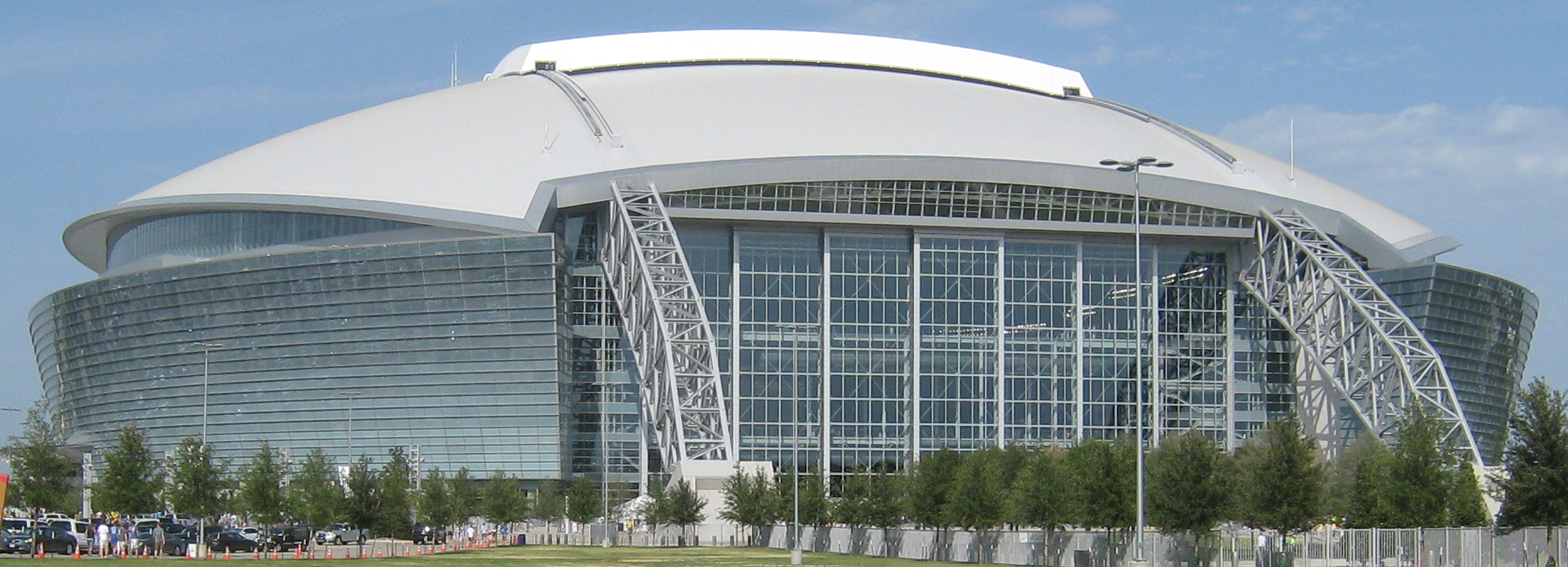
- Cowboys Stadium in Arlington, Texas, hosted the Cotton Bowl Classic.
Kansas State Wildcats	Arkansas Razorbacks
(10–2)	(10–2)
Big 12	SEC
16	29
Head coach: Bill Snyder	Head coach: Bobby Petrino
AP / Coaches / BCS; 11 / 10 / 8	AP / Coaches / BCS; 7 / 7 / 6
	1	2	3	4	Total
Kansas State	0	9	7	0	16
Arkansas	3	16	7	3	29
- Date: January 6, 2012
- Season: 2011
- Stadium: Cowboys Stadium
- Location: Arlington, Texas
- MVP: Offensive: Tyler Wilson (QB, Arkansas) Defensive: Jake Bequette (DE, Arkansas)
- Favorite: Arkansas by 7
- National anthem: The Band Perry
- Referee: John O’Neill (Big Ten)
- Halftime show: Arkansas Razorback Marching Band, KSU Marching Band
- Attendance: 80,956
- Payout: US$6.75 million per team

United States TV coverage
- Network: FOX
- Announcers: Gus Johnson (Play-by-Play); Charles Davis (Analyst); Tim Brewster and Daryl Johnston (Sidelines)
- Nielsen ratings: 4.95

The 2012 AT&T Cotton Bowl Classic, the 76th edition of the game, was a post-season American college football bowl game, held on January 6, 2012 at Cowboys Stadium in Arlington, Texas as part of the 2011–12 NCAA Bowl season.

The game, which was telecast at 7:00 p.m. CT on FOX, featured the Kansas State Wildcats from the Big XII Conference versus the Arkansas Razorbacks from the SEC Conference. Arkansas won the game 29–16, which was their first win over Kansas State since 1967.

This was only the second time in the BCS era that a non-BCS bowl had two teams with higher BCS rankings playing than teams in a BCS bowl (the first being the 2008 Poinsettia Bowl). The 2012 Sugar Bowl, and 2012 Orange Bowl had teams with lower BCS rankings squaring off.

== Teams ==
This was the first meeting between Arkansas and Kansas State in the postseason and the fifth time overall.

=== Arkansas ===
Arkansas came into this game with a 10-2 record, including a perfect 7–0 record at home. Arkansas' only losses were on the road to #1 LSU and #2 Alabama. Quarterbacking for the Razorbacks was No. 8 Tyler Wilson (Jr., 6–3, 220). The team was ranked 13th (1st in the SEC) in passing offense (307.8 yards per game) and 27th (1st in SEC) in total offense (445.8 yards per game). In 2011, Wilson threw for 3,422 yards (285 yards per game) for 22 touchdowns with a 63.1 percent pass completion.

=== Kansas State ===
2011 National and Big XII Coach of the Year Bill Snyder brought into this game a successful ground game that went 10–2 during the 2011 season. Quarterbacking for the Wildcats was No. 7 Collin Klein (Jr. 6–5, 226). Klein ranked second nationally in rushing with his 1,099 net yards and had 26 rushing scores. He passed for 12 touchdowns, fifth in the Big XII. Running back John Hubert had 933 rushing yards and three touchdowns for the Wildcats in 2011.

== Game summary ==
Arkansas placekicker Zach Hocker started off the scoring with a 26-yard field goal, to give Arkansas a 3–0 lead. K-State couldn't do anything with the ball early, as the Hogs defense played outstanding against the run for most of the night.

After pinning the Wildcats near their own goal line, K-State punted. Arkansas return man Joe Adams fielded that 47 yard kick at the Hogs 49 yard line, got three or four great blocks by his teammates, and ran down the right sideline for a touchdown. It was Adams’ fourth punt returned for a touchdown on the season, and was the first in the Cotton Bowl since Arkansas’ Lance Alworth took one back in the 1961 Cotton Bowl versus Duke.

After another Hocker field goal to make it 13–0, Arkansas QB Tyler Wilson connected with receiver Jarius Wright on a 45-yard touchdown bomb, stretching Arkansas’ lead to 19–0. Kansas State lineman Raphael Guidry blocked the extra point attempt, and Nigel Malone scooped up the ball and returned it for 2 points, making the Hogs lead 19–2. K-State would get a TD pass from Klein to TE Andre MacDonald just before halftime, setting the score at 19–9.

In the 3rd quarter K-State drove 60 yards in just over three minutes, and Klein dove in from the six yard line to cut Arkansas’ lead to 19–16. Two possessions later, the Hogs put together a 68-yard drive that took three minutes and twenty-five seconds. The drive culminated with a 9-yard TD pass from Wilson to Cobi Hamilton, pushing Arkansas’ lead back to ten points, 26–16.

With time winding down, KSU abandoned their vaunted option-style running game, and started throwing the ball. The Razorbacks sacked the K-State QB 7 times, one shy of the record set in the 2000 Cotton Bowl by Arkansas, in a 27–6 win over Texas.

Hocker would add his third field goal to stretch Arkansas’ lead to 29–16, with three and a half minutes to play. On their final possession, KSU only ran for positive yardage once, on a Klein scramble. Most of Klein's completions for the game were underneath the coverage, and for shorter gains. His longest completion went for 23 yards. With under a minute to play, Klein finally went deep. Arkansas rover Jerico Nelson was there for the interception, returning it 61 yards, and sealing the victory for the Hogs.

Arkansas improved to 11-2 for the 2011 season, claimed their fourth Cotton Bowl championship (1965, 1976, 2000) in school history, and was ranked #5 in the final polls. It was Arkansas' first 11 win season since 1977. Kansas State fell to 10–3.

=== Scoring summary ===
Scoring play	Score
1st quarter
ARK – Zach Hocker 26-yard field goal, 4:19	ARK 3–0
2nd quarter
ARK – Joe Adams 51-yard punt return (Hocker kick), 14:27	ARK 10–0
ARK – Hocker 22-yard field goal, 9:20	ARK 13–0
ARK – Jarius Wright 45-yard pass from Tyler Wilson, 4:10	ARK 19–0
KSST – Nigel Malone 2-point defensive conversion, 4:10	ARK 19–2
KSST – Andre McDonald 4-yard pass from Colin Klein (Anthony Cantele kick), 0:26	ARK 19–9
3rd quarter
KSST – Klein 6-yard run (Cantele kick), 11:38	ARK 19–16
ARK – Cobi Hamilton 9-yard pass from Wilson (Hocker kick), 3:57	ARK 26–16
4th quarter
ARK – Hocker 30-yard field goal, 3:30	ARK 29–16

Arkansas QB Tyler Wilson was the Offensive MVP ... 20 completions on 31 attempts (65%), 216 yards, 2 TD; 7 carries for 18 yards.

Arkansas DE Jake Bequette was the Defensive MVP ... 5 tackles, 3 sacks, 1 caused fumble.
