= New Sarpy, Louisiana =

New Sarpy L'Anse Aux Outardes
- Census-designated place
- Location of New Sarpy in Louisiana
- Coordinates: 29°58′44″N 90°23′08″W
- Country: United States
- State: Louisiana
- Parish: St. Charles

Area
  - Total: 1.38 sq mi (3.57 km^{2})
  - Land: 1.14 sq mi (2.94 km^{2})
  - Water: 0.24 sq mi (0.63 km^{2})
- Elevation: 3 ft (0.91 m)

Population (2020)
  - Total: 1,169
  - Density: 1,029.7/sq mi (397.58/km^{2})
- Time zone: UTC-6 (CST)
  - Summer (DST): UTC-5 (CDT)
- Area code: 985
- L'Anse Aux Outardes: Bustard’s cove, 1722. Settled by Canadians, French, Bienville came here in 1699 from Lake Pontchartrain using small waterways, portage. LeSueur and Canadians used the route and were met here by Iberville and Tonti February 24, 1700. It became part of the Second German Coast about 1730.

New Sarpy is a census-designated place (CDP) in St. Charles Parish, Louisiana, United States. The population was 1,169 at the 2020 census.

== History ==
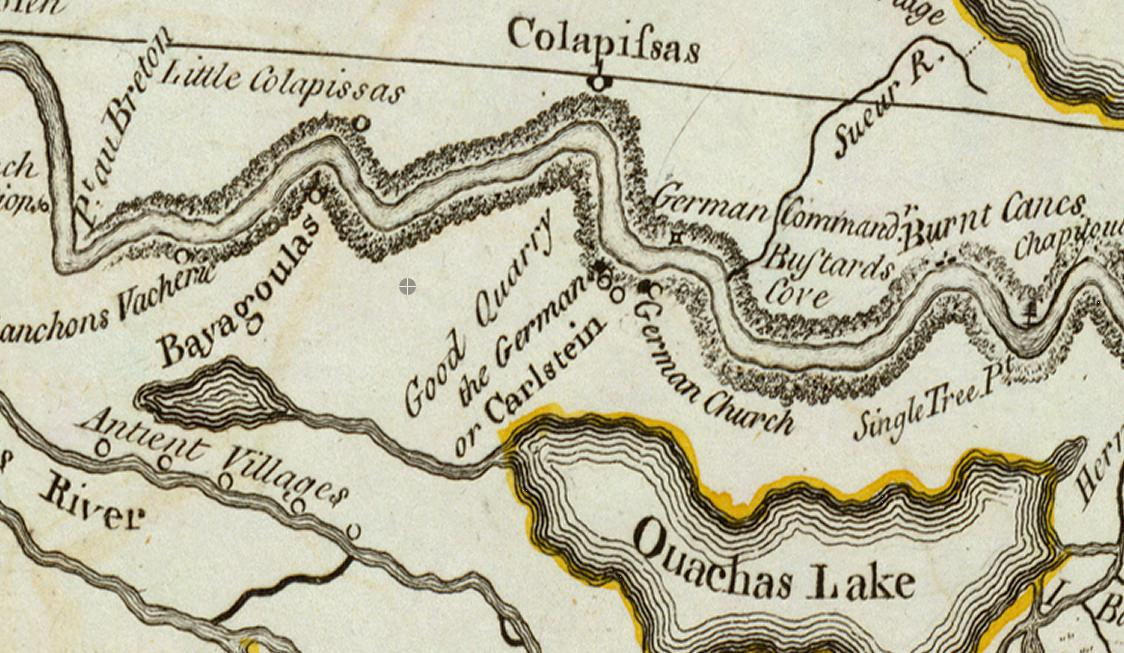
A 1775 map of the German Coast with Bustards Cove located on the east bank of the Mississippi River, at its confluence with the Sueur River.

In 1699, Pierre Le Moyne d'Iberville and Jean-Baptiste Le Moyne de Bienville discovered an indigenous Bayagoula settlement located near the Mississippi River intersection with a tributary in present-day New Sarpy. The site was named L’Anse aux Outardes or Bustard’s Cove.

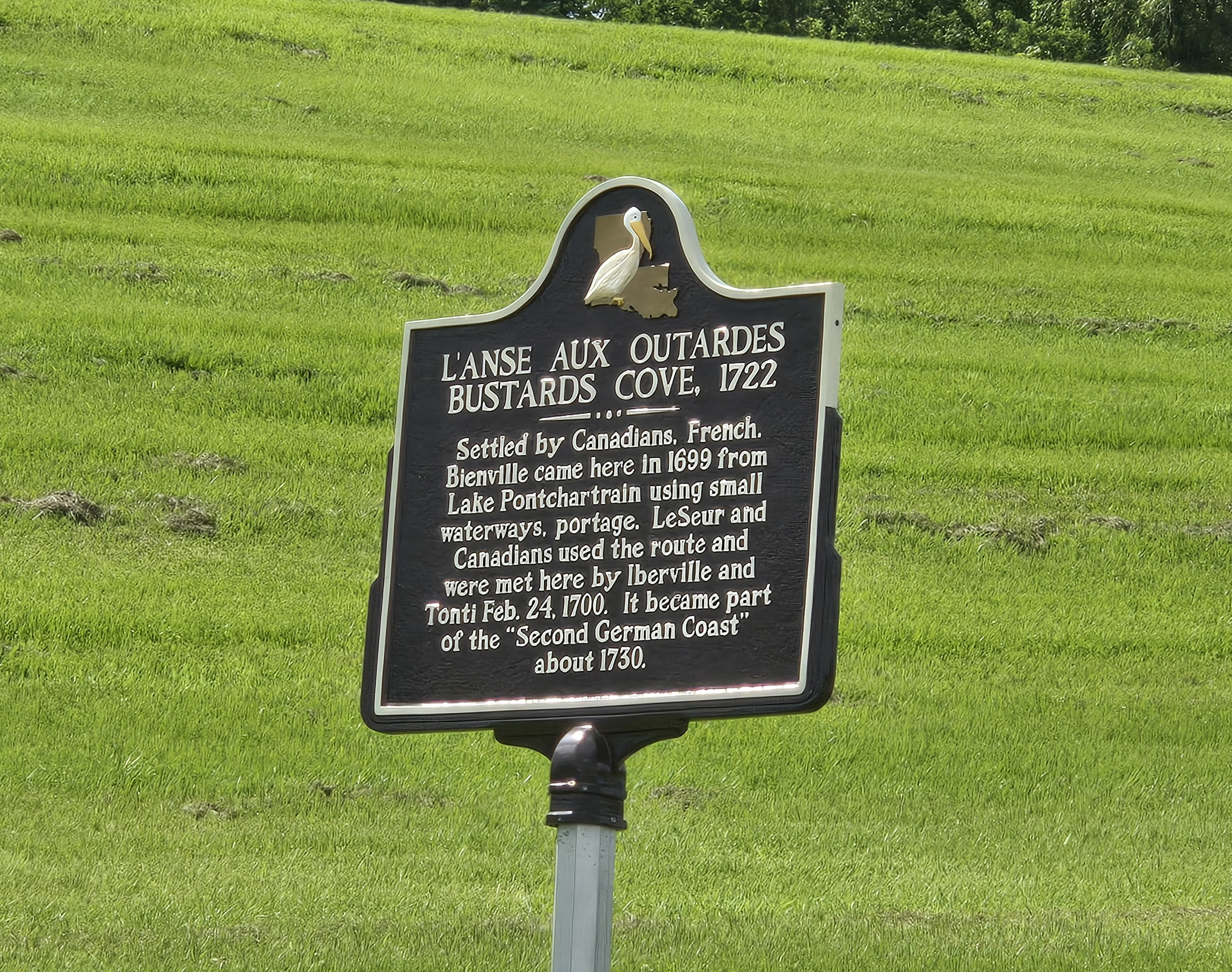
L'Anse Aux Outardes Bustards Cove, 1722 Historical Marker

In 1722 and 1723, French, German, and newly arrived settlers from French Canada were granted lands on the east bank of the Mississippi River and moved from west bank German Coast villages to establish the first east bank settlement at L’Anse aux Outardes or Bustard’s Cove. The granting of lands on the east bank, led to the founding of the Second German Coast in 1730 and the establishment of officially having settlements on both banks of the Mississippi River.

== Geography ==
New Sarpy is located at 29°58′44″N 90°23′8″W (29.978937, -90.385492).

According to the United States Census Bureau, the CDP has a total area of 2.0 square miles (5.3 km^{2}), of which 1.7 square miles (4.4 km^{2}) is land and 0.3 square mile (0.9 km^{2}) (17.16%) is water.

== Demographics ==
Historical population
Census	Pop.	Note	%±
1960	1,259		—
1970	1,643		30.5%
1980	2,249		36.9%
1990	2,946		31.0%
2000	1,568		−46.8%
2010	1,464		−6.6%
2020	1,169		−20.2%
U.S. Decennial Census; 1950 1960 1970 1980; 1990 2000 2010

New Sarpy first appeared as an unincorporated place in the 1960 U.S. census; and as a census designated place in the 1980 United States census.

New Sarpy racial composition as of 2020
Race	Number	Percentage
White (non-Hispanic)	497	42.51%
Black or African American (non-Hispanic)	565	48.33%
Native American	2	0.17%
Other/Mixed	51	4.36%
Hispanic or Latino	54	4.62%

As of the 2020 United States census, there were 1,169 people, 441 households, and 353 families residing in the CDP.

== Education ==
St. Charles Parish Public School System operates public schools, including:

- New Sarpy Elementary School
- Destrehan High School in Destrehan

== Popular culture ==
The film Bug, directed by William Friedkin, includes scenes shot at Migliore's Grocery and Boomerang's Bar, in New Sarpy. The scenes were filmed on August 2, 2005, and the film had its US theatrical release on May 25, 2007.

== Notable people ==
- Jerico Nelson, NFL safety for the New Orleans Saints
