= Jake Bequette =

American football player (born 1989)

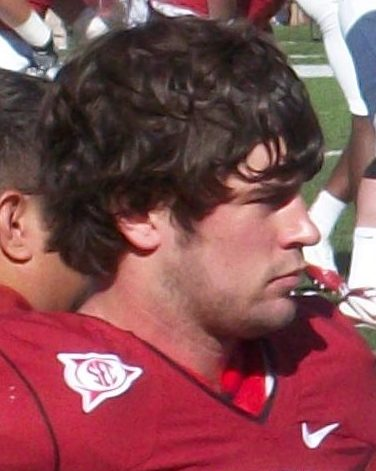
- Bequette at the 2011 Arkansas spring football game

No. 92
- Position: Defensive end

Personal information
- Born: February 21, 1989 (age 37); Little Rock, Arkansas, U.S.
- Listed height: 6 ft 5 in (1.96 m)
- Listed weight: 265 lb (120 kg)

Career information
- High school: Catholic (Little Rock)
- College: Arkansas
- NFL draft: 2012: 3rd round, 90th overall pick

Career history
- New England Patriots (2012–2014)

Awards and highlights
- Super Bowl champion (XLIX); First-team All-SEC (2011); Second-team All-SEC (2010); Freshman All-SEC (2008)

Career NFL statistics
- Games played: 8
- Stats at Pro Football Reference

George Jules "Jake" Bequette III (born February 21, 1989) is an American former professional football player who was a defensive end for the New England Patriots of the National Football League (NFL). He was selected in the third round with the 90th overall pick by the Patriots in the 2012 NFL draft. He played high school football at Catholic High in Little Rock, Arkansas, and college football for the Arkansas Razorbacks. Bequette was rated highly as a defensive end prospect in that year's draft.

After his football career, Bequette was a United States Army infantry officer who served in Iraq in support of Operation Inherent Resolve. He was an unsuccessful candidate for the Republican nomination in the 2022 United States Senate election in Arkansas.

== Early life and college ==
Jake Bequette was born George Jules Bequette III in Little Rock. Bequette attended Catholic High School in Little Rock. After high school, Bequette attended the University of Arkansas, where he played college football for the Razorbacks from 2007 to 2011. During his career, he started 42 of 48 games, recording 140 tackles and 23.5 sacks. As a senior, he was a first-team All-Southeastern Conference selection.

Bequette was named the Defensive MVP of the 2012 Cotton Bowl, helping the 2011 Arkansas Razorbacks football team defeat Kansas State, 29–16, as the Razorbacks finished the 2011 season with a record of 11–2, and a No. 5 final ranking in all polls. Bequette finished the game with five tackles and three quarterback sacks. Bequette is a third-generation Razorback: his grandfather George and father Jay both played for Arkansas, as did his uncle.

== Professional career ==
Pre-draft measurables
Height	Weight	Arm length	Hand span	40-yard dash	10-yard split	20-yard split	20-yard shuttle	Three-cone drill	Vertical jump	Broad jump
6 ft 4 5/8 in (1.95 m)	274 lb (124 kg)	32 in (0.81 m)	9 1/4 in (0.23 m)	4.82 s	1.71 s	2.83 s	4.07 s	6.90 s	34.0 in (0.86 m)	9 ft 5 in (2.87 m)
All values from NFL Combine

Bequette was selected in the third round by the New England Patriots in the 2012 NFL draft. He played in three games in 2012, and five games in 2013. He was released by the Patriots on August 30, 2014, as part of final roster cuts. He did not see extensive playing time during his time with the Patriots, but re-signed with the team's practice squad shortly after the 2014 cuts. Bequette received a Super Bowl ring with the Patriots in 2014.

Before the 2015 season, the Patriots switched Bequette from defensive end to tight end. Bequette was waived by the Patriots and subsequently placed on injured reserve after clearing waivers on August 28, 2015. He was released with an injury settlement on September 4, 2015, and became a free agent.

== Post-football career ==
In August 2017, Bequette joined the United States Army. After basic training and Officer Candidate School, he went on to become a Ranger-qualified infantry officer in the 101st Airborne Division. Bequette later served a five-month deployment in Iraq in 2019.

In January 2021, he launched The Arkansas Fund, a nonprofit dedicated to helping small businesses in Arkansas that have struggled as a result of the COVID-19 pandemic. In July 2021, he announced his candidacy for U.S. Senate against Arkansas Senator John Boozman, challenging Boozman from the right in the Republican primary for the 2022 election. On May 24, 2022, Boozman ultimately won with 58% of the vote to Bequette's 20%, easily avoiding a runoff.
