= Collin Klein =

American gridiron football player and coach (born 1989)

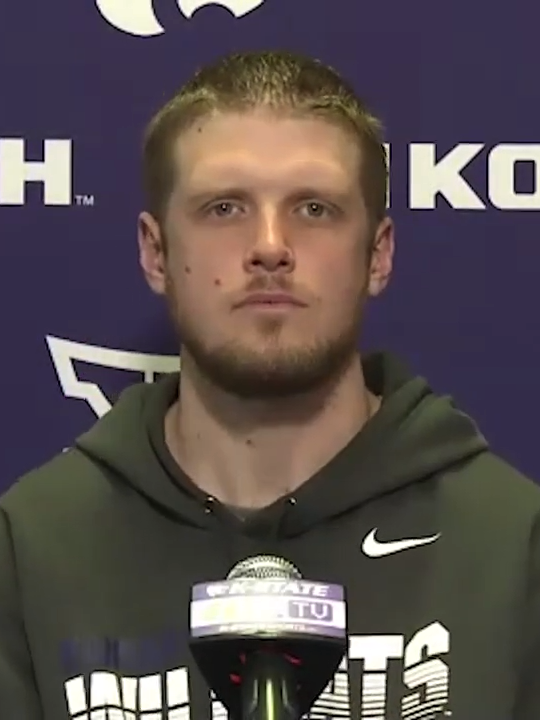
- Klein in 2021

Current position
- Title: Head coach
- Team: Kansas State
- Conference: Big 12
- Record: 4–6
- Annual salary: $4.1 million

Biographical details
- Born: September 19, 1989 (age 37); Loveland, Colorado, U.S.

Playing career
- 2008–2012: Kansas State
- 2014*: Montreal Alouettes
- Position: Quarterback

Coaching career (HC unless noted)
- 2014–2015: Kansas State (DQC/GA)
- 2016: Northern Iowa (QB)
- 2017: Kansas State (QB)
- 2018: Kansas State (co-OC/QB)
- 2019–2021: Kansas State (QB)
- 2022–2023: Kansas State (OC/QB)
- 2024–2025: Texas A&M (OC/QB)
- 2026–present: Kansas State

Head coaching record
- Overall: 4–6

Accomplishments and honors

Awards
- Johnny Unitas Golden Arm Award (2012); Kellen Moore Award (2012); Second-team All-American (2012); Big 12 Offensive Player of the Year (2012); Big 12 Athlete of the Year (2012); 2× First-team All-Big 12 (2011, 2012)

Collin Klein (born September 19, 1989) is an American college football coach and former player who is currently the head coach at Kansas State University, his alma mater. Klein played as a wide receiver for the Wildcats during the 2009 season, and made his first career start at quarterback in a win against the Texas Longhorns during the 2010 season. Klein finished his college career ranked 15th all-time in career NCAA rushing touchdowns.

== College career ==
Redshirted in 2008, Klein played either at wide receiver or on special teams for the entire 2009 season, catching six passes for 38 yards and one touchdown. He returned to the quarterback position in 2010, earning spot duty early in the year before making his first career start against the Texas Longhorns, a game which the Wildcats won 39–14 and in which Klein rushed for 127 yards and two touchdowns; he completed two of four attempted passes. Klein was one of two quarterbacks in the Big 12 with at least two 100-yard rushing games in the season.

Klein became the Wildcats' first-string quarterback at the beginning of the 2011 season, taking over from a graduating Carson Coffman. In the team's spring game, he passed for 358 yards and five touchdowns.

Klein led Kansas State to victories over their first seven opponents of the season—the Wildcats' first 7–0 start since the year 1999—including four consecutive games in which Kansas State was considered an underdog. On September 24, 2011, Klein led his team to a 28–24 win against a Miami Hurricanes team coming off a win against the defending Sugar Bowl champion Ohio State Buckeyes. The next week, Klein passed for 146 yards in Kansas State's 36–35 upset of the Baylor Bears, a team then ranked fifteenth in the nation by the Associated Press. That game would mark the first time since 2004 that a Wildcat quarterback rushed and passed for over a hundred yards in a single game.

Following a 7–1 start, Klein would set career highs for passing yardage in consecutive weeks, first with 231 yards in a narrow 52–45 loss against third-ranked Oklahoma State, then with 281 yards in a dramatic quadruple overtime victory at Bill Snyder Family Stadium against Texas A&M. Klein also rushed for a career-high five touchdowns in the 53–50 win.

He was an Honorable Mention All-American selection by Sports Illustrated, and earned First Team All-Big 12 honors as an all-purpose player from the Associated Press, ESPN.com, Kansas City Star, Fort Worth Star-Telegram and the San Antonio Express-News. He earned an All-Big 12 honorable mention from the league's coaches, and was a Second Team Academic All-Big 12 selection. His 27 rushing touchdowns during the 2011 season would equal two national records—most rushing touchdowns in a season by a Big 12 player, and most rushing touchdowns in a season by a quarterback in the Football Bowl Subdivision. These records had previously been set by Ricky Williams and Ricky Dobbs, respectively. He also broke a 42-year-old school record for rushing touchdowns in a season, previously held by Mack Herron, who ran for 20 in 1969.

Klein led the Big 12 with 317 rushing attempts, 67 more than the next highest player and the most in team history. Klein led the Big 12 conference and ranked third nationally with 162 points scored—a mark which was first among quarterbacks. In the 2012 Cotton Bowl Classic, he threw for 173 yards and a touchdown while rushing for 42 yards and a touchdown, but Kansas State would lose to Arkansas, 29–16, finishing 10–3.

The Wildcats would start off the 2012 season 10–0, with Klein having made obvious improvements to his passing game during the offseason. On September 22, 2012, Kansas State would upset the sixth-ranked Oklahoma Sooners in Norman, 24–19—the first time in Bob Stoops's tenure as head coach that the Sooners lost to a ranked team at home. He went on to lead the team to an 11–1 record and K-State's first conference championship since 2003. They played the Oregon Ducks in the 2013 Fiesta Bowl, but lost 35–17. Klein completed 17 of 32 passes for 151 yards with one touchdown pass, and ran for another, but also threw two interceptions.

Due to his accomplishments during the 2012 college football season, he was selected as a finalist for the Heisman Trophy. He finished third in voting. He later played in the 2013 East-West Shrine Game, but struggled, completing 5 of 13 passes for 43 yards and an interception.

=== College statistics ===
Season	Team	Games			Passing								Rushing			
Season	Team	GP	GS	Record (Note: Accounts for only GS as a QB. Klein started 9/26/09 and 10/3/09 at WR.)	Cmp	Att	Pct	Yds	Avg	TD	Int	Rate	Att	Yds	Avg	TD
2009	Kansas State	0	0	—	Redshirted (redshirt)											
2009	Kansas State	12	2	—	1	1	100.0	27	27.0	0	0	326.8	1	−8	−8.0	0
2010	Kansas State	10	2	1–1	11	18	61.1	138	7.7	1	0	143.8	76	432	5.7	6
2011	Kansas State	13	13	10–3	161	281	57.3	1,918	6.8	13	6	125.6	317	1,141	3.6	27
2012	Kansas State	13	13	11–2	197	304	64.8	2,641	8.7	16	9	149.2	207	920	4.4	23
Total		48	30	22–6	370	604	61.3	4,724	7.8	30	15	138.4	601	2,485	4.1	56

== Professional career ==
=== 2013 NFL draft ===
Pre-draft measurables
Height	Weight	Arm length	Hand span	Wingspan	40-yard dash	10-yard split	20-yard split	20-yard shuttle	Three-cone drill	Vertical jump	Broad jump
6 ft 4 7/8 in (1.95 m)	226 lb (103 kg)	32 in (0.81 m)	9 1/4 in (0.23 m)	6 ft 5 3/8 in (1.97 m)	4.78 s	1.67 s	2.81 s	4.40 s	7.17 s	31.5 in (0.80 m)	9 ft 3 in (2.82 m)
All values from NFL Combine/Pro Day

Klein was asked to work out with the tight ends at the NFL Scouting Combine, despite saying that he wanted to remain a quarterback.

=== Houston Texans ===
On April 27, 2013, Klein was invited to the Texans' rookie minicamp as a rookie tryout. Klein was not offered a contract at the conclusion of the rookie minicamp.

=== Montreal Alouettes ===
Klein signed a two-year deal with the Montreal Alouettes of the Canadian Football League in 2014. He was released on June 15, 2014.

== Coaching career ==
=== Early coaching career ===
Klein was a member of the Wildcats' football coaching staff in 2014 and 2015, where he was the assistant director of recruiting, a defensive quality control coach, and graduate assistant. Klein was the quarterbacks coach for the University of Northern Iowa as of the fall of 2016 but returned to Kansas State during the offseason to be the team's quarterbacks coach. In early February 2018 Klein was promoted to co-offensive coordinator in addition to his quarterback coaching duties. After Chris Klieman was named the successor to Bill Snyder, Klein was removed from coordinator duties but remained as the team's quarterbacks coach.

In January 2022, Klein was promoted to offensive coordinator at Kansas State.

In December 2023, it was announced that Klein accepted the offensive coordinator role at Texas A&M University.

=== Kansas State ===
On December 4, 2025, Klein was named the head coach at K-State, replacing the retired Chris Klieman. Klein remained with the Aggies through the College Football Playoff.

== Personal life ==
Klein was born on September 19, 1989, to Doug and Kelly Klein. He played football for Loveland High School in Colorado and set school records for completion percentage and all-purpose yards. His younger brother, Kyle, was a wide receiver for Kansas State. His grandfather is a barber in Estes Park, Colorado.

When Klein was in kindergarten, he became interested in learning to play the piano, and began taking lessons the next year. He would later learn how to play both the mandolin and the violin.

Klein married former K-State basketball player Shalin Spani in the summer of 2012, gaining national attention because they had their first kiss at the altar. Shalin is the daughter of K-State football great Gary Spani. The couple has four children.

== Head coaching record ==
Year	Team	Overall	Conference	Standing	Bowl/playoffs
Kansas State Wildcats (Big 12 Conference) (2026–present)
2026	Kansas State	4–6	1–6		
Kansas State:		4–6	1–6		
Total:		4–6			
