= 2022 United States Senate election in Arkansas =

- November 8, 2022
- Turnout: 50.81% ▼
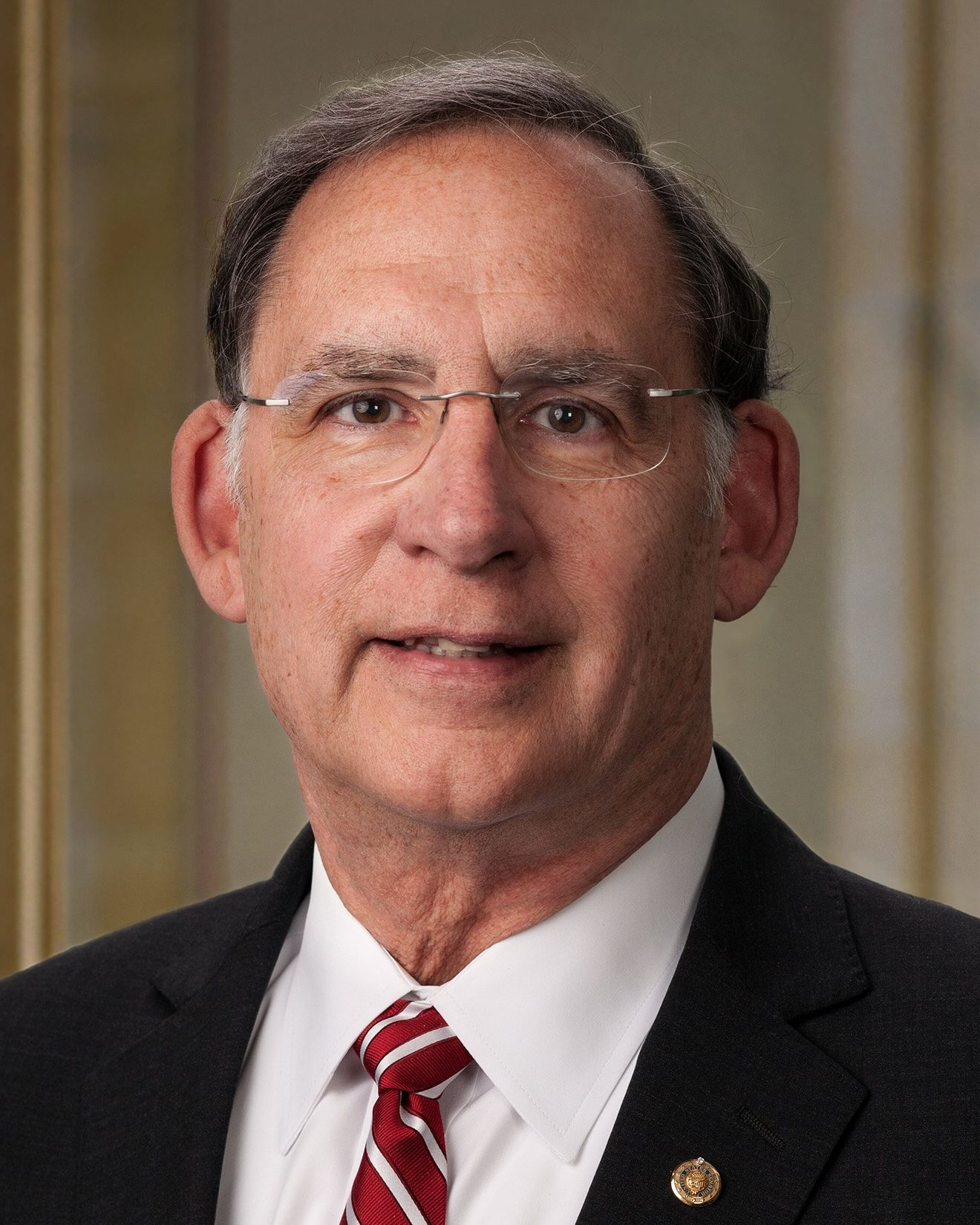

Nominee	John Boozman	Natalie James
Party	Republican	Democratic
Popular vote	592,437	280,187
Percentage	65.73%	31.09%
- Boozman: 40–50% 50–60% 60–70% 70–80% 80–90% James: 50–60%
U.S. senator before election
John Boozman
Republican
Elected U.S. senator
John Boozman
Republican

The 2022 United States Senate election in Arkansas was held on November 8, 2022, to elect a member to the United States Senate to represent the state of Arkansas. Incumbent Republican Senator John Boozman ran for a third term. He won the May 24, 2022 Republican primary with 58.03% of the vote and the general election with 65.73% of the vote.

This was the best performance for a Republican senator in the state's history, and was the first time for either U.S. Senate seat in Arkansas that Republicans won three consecutive elections.

== Republican primary ==
Incumbent senator John Boozman ran with the endorsement of former President Donald Trump. However, he attracted multiple opponents from the right who questioned his loyalty to Trump, attacking him for refusing to object to the results of the 2020 United States presidential election. Despite it being his first time running for office, former NFL football player Jake Bequette and his supporting groups raised over $2.6 million. Boozman ultimately won with 58% of the vote, easily avoiding a runoff.

=== Candidates ===
==== Nominee ====
- John Boozman, incumbent U.S. senator

==== Eliminated in primary ====
- Jake Bequette, former NFL player and U.S. Army veteran
- Heath Loftis, pastor
- Jan Morgan, gun range owner and candidate for governor of Arkansas in 2018

==== Withdrew ====
- Michael Deel, corporate analyst

=== Endorsements ===
John Boozman

Executive branch officials

- Sarah Huckabee Sanders, former White House press secretary (2017–2019)
- Donald Trump, former president of the United States (2017–2021)

U.S. senators

- Tom Cotton, Arkansas (2015–present)
- Mitch McConnell, Senate minority leader (2021–2025) from Kentucky (1985–present)

Organizations

- Citizens for Responsible Energy Solutions
- National Right to Life
- Pro-Israel America
Jake Bequette

U.S. representatives

- Madison Cawthorn, NC-11 (2021–2023)
- Burgess Owens, UT-04 (2021–present)

=== Fundraising ===
Campaign finance reports as of May 4, 2022
Candidate	Raised	Spent	Cash on hand
John Boozman (R)	$5,515,449	$4,930,354	$1,580,776
Jake Bequette (R)	$1,262,746	$875,103	$375,720
Source: Federal Election Commission

=== Polling ===
Poll source	Date(s) administered	Sample size (Note: Key: A – all adults RV – registered voters LV – likely voters V – unclear)	Margin of error	Jake Bequette	John Boozman	Heath Loftis	Jan Morgan	Undecided
Hendrix College	May 2, 2022	802 (LV)	± 4.3%	19%	45%	2%	17%	18%

=== Results ===
Results by county: Boozman: 40–50%; 50–60%; 60–70%; 70–80%

Republican primary results
Party	Candidate	Votes	%
Republican	John Boozman (incumbent)	201,677	58.03%
Republican	Jake Bequette	71,809	20.66%
Republican	Jan Morgan	65,958	18.98%
Republican	Heath Loftis	8,112	2.33%
Total votes		347,556	100.0%

== Democratic primary ==
=== Candidates ===
==== Nominee ====
- Natalie James, realtor

==== Eliminated in primary ====
- Jack Foster, former Pine Bluff city alderman
- Dan Whitfield, activist and Independent candidate that failed to make the ballot for the U.S. Senate in 2020

=== Polling ===
Poll source	Date(s) administered	Sample size	Margin of error	Jack Foster	Natalie James	Dan Whitfield	Undecided
Hendrix College	May 2, 2022	597 (LV)	± 5.0%	5%	17%	15%	63%

=== Results ===
Results by county: James: 40–50%; 50–60%; 60–70%; James/Whitfield tie: 40–50%; Whitfield: 30–40%; 40–50%; 50–60%; Foster: 30–40%; 50–60%

Democratic primary results
Party	Candidate	Votes	%
Democratic	Natalie James	49,722	54.09%
Democratic	Dan Whitfield	28,319	30.80%
Democratic	Jack Foster	13,891	15.11%
Total votes		91,932	100.0%

== Libertarian convention ==
=== Candidates ===
==== Nominated at convention ====
- Kenneth Cates, firefighter

== General election ==
=== Predictions ===
Source	Ranking	As of
The Cook Political Report	Solid R	March 4, 2022
Inside Elections	Solid R	April 1, 2022
Sabato's Crystal Ball	Safe R	March 1, 2022
Politico	Solid R	April 1, 2022
RCP	Safe R	February 24, 2022
Fox News	Solid R	May 12, 2022
DDHQ	Solid R	July 20, 2022
538	Solid R	June 30, 2022
The Economist	Safe R	September 7, 2022

=== Post-primary endorsements ===
Natalie James (D)

Organizations

- League of Conservation Voters
- National Women's Political Caucus
- Vote Common Good

=== Polling ===
Poll source	Date(s) administered	Sample size	Margin of error	John Boozman (R)	Natalie James (D)	Other	Undecided
Hendrix College	September 12, 2022	835 (LV)	± 3.8%	44%	31%	5% (Note: Cates with 5%)	21%
Echelon Insights	August 31 – September 7, 2022	382 (RV)	± 7.7%	56%	32%	–	12%

=== Results ===
2022 United States Senate election in Arkansas
Party	Candidate	Votes	%	±%
Republican	John Boozman (incumbent)	592,437	65.73%	+5.96%
Democratic	Natalie James	280,187	31.09%	−5.08%
Libertarian	Kenneth Cates	28,682	3.18%	−0.78%
Total votes		901,306	100.00%	N/A
Republican hold				

==== By county ====
County	John Boozman Republican		Natalie James Democratic		Kenneth Cates Libertarian		Margin		Total
County	#	%	#	%	#	%	#	%	Total
Arkansas	3,342	74.95%	1,012	22.70%	105	2.35%	2,330	52.25%	4,459
Ashley	4,103	75.51%	1,251	23.02%	80	1.47%	2,852	52.48%	5,434
Baxter	12,207	78.30%	2,940	18.86%	443	2.84%	9,267	59.44%	15,590
Benton	58,938	65.08%	28,336	31.29%	3,288	3.63%	30,602	33.79%	90,562
Boone	10,174	80.20%	1,979	15.60%	533	4.20%	8,195	64.60%	12,686
Bradley	1,824	69.70%	730	27.89%	63	2.41%	1,094	41.80%	2,617
Calhoun	1,269	80.16%	281	17.75%	33	2.08%	988	62.41%	1,583
Carroll	5,867	64.98%	2,835	31.40%	327	3.62%	3,032	33.58%	9,029
Chicot	1,687	49.90%	1,653	48.89%	41	1.21%	34	1.01%	3,381
Clark	3,685	60.36%	2,267	37.13%	153	2.51%	1,418	23.23%	6,105
Clay	3,080	78.63%	698	17.82%	139	3.55%	2,382	60.81%	3,917
Cleburne	8,336	83.14%	1,342	13.39%	348	3.47%	6,994	69.76%	10,026
Cleveland	2,343	84.04%	380	13.63%	65	2.33%	1,963	70.41%	2,788
Columbia	4,177	69.01%	1,752	28.94%	124	2.05%	2,425	40.06%	6,053
Conway	4,648	69.21%	1,856	27.64%	212	3.16%	2,792	41.57%	6,716
Craighead	18,697	67.78%	7,882	28.58%	1,004	3.64%	10,815	39.21%	27,583
Crawford	13,894	78.59%	3,125	17.68%	660	3.73%	10,769	60.91%	17,679
Crittenden	5,436	51.07%	4,999	46.96%	210	1.97%	437	4.11%	10,645
Cross	3,707	75.58%	1,079	22.00%	119	2.43%	2,628	53.58%	4,905
Dallas	1,366	66.50%	630	30.67%	58	2.82%	736	35.83%	2,054
Desha	1,647	54.64%	1,296	43.00%	71	2.36%	351	11.65%	3,014
Drew	3,525	67.19%	1,632	31.11%	89	1.70%	1,893	36.08%	5,246
Faulkner	26,218	65.54%	12,257	30.64%	1,526	3.81%	13,961	34.90%	40,001
Franklin	4,284	79.73%	892	16.60%	197	3.67%	3,392	63.13%	5,373
Fulton	3,119	78.60%	681	17.16%	168	4.23%	2,438	61.44%	3,968
Garland	22,606	68.60%	9,162	27.80%	1,186	3.60%	13,444	40.80%	32,954
Grant	5,205	82.91%	859	13.68%	214	3.41%	4,346	69.23%	6,278
Greene	9,050	78.65%	2,027	17.62%	429	3.73%	7,023	61.04%	11,506
Hempstead	3,338	72.00%	1,193	25.73%	105	2.26%	2,145	46.27%	4,636
Hot Spring	7,360	74.60%	2,139	21.68%	367	3.72%	5,221	52.92%	9,866
Howard	2,668	73.84%	861	23.83%	84	2.32%	1,807	50.01%	3,613
Independence	8,325	79.13%	1,839	17.48%	357	3.39%	6,486	61.65%	10,521
Izard	3,687	80.75%	721	15.79%	158	3.46%	2,966	64.96%	4,566
Jackson	2,913	72.61%	988	24.63%	111	2.77%	1,925	47.98%	4,012
Jefferson	7,570	43.97%	9,339	54.25%	307	1.78%	-1,769	-10.28%	17,216
Johnson	5,287	75.67%	1,458	20.87%	242	3.46%	3,829	54.80%	6,987
Lafayette	1,281	65.49%	632	32.31%	43	2.20%	649	33.18%	1,956
Lawrence	3,692	80.68%	729	15.93%	155	3.39%	2,963	64.75%	4,576
Lee	978	49.20%	956	48.09%	54	2.72%	22	1.11%	1,988
Lincoln	2,040	74.64%	619	22.65%	74	2.71%	1,421	51.99%	2,733
Little River	2,879	75.98%	798	21.06%	112	2.96%	2,081	54.92%	3,789
Logan	4,920	79.00%	1,094	17.57%	214	3.44%	3,826	61.43%	6,228
Lonoke	17,007	76.14%	4,477	20.04%	852	3.81%	12,530	56.10%	22,336
Madison	4,489	77.73%	1,102	19.08%	184	3.19%	3,387	58.65%	5,775
Marion	4,766	79.65%	1,015	16.96%	203	3.39%	3,751	62.68%	5,984
Miller	8,475	75.78%	2,422	21.66%	286	2.56%	6,053	54.13%	11,183
Mississippi	5,430	63.87%	2,876	33.83%	195	2.29%	2,554	30.04%	8,501
Monroe	1,295	57.99%	891	39.90%	47	2.10%	404	18.09%	2,233
Montgomery	2,516	79.80%	532	16.87%	105	3.33%	1,984	62.92%	3,153
Nevada	1,667	67.87%	740	30.13%	49	2.00%	927	37.74%	2,456
Newton	2,440	79.74%	513	16.76%	107	3.50%	1,927	62.97%	3,060
Ouachita	4,163	59.52%	2,663	38.08%	168	2.40%	1,500	21.45%	6,994
Perry	2,919	76.98%	712	18.78%	161	4.25%	2,207	58.20%	3,792
Phillips	1,929	45.11%	2,281	53.34%	66	1.54%	-352	-8.23%	4,276
Pike	3,133	84.61%	472	12.75%	98	2.65%	2,661	71.86%	3,703
Poinsett	4,419	79.64%	976	17.59%	154	2.78%	3,443	62.05%	5,549
Polk	5,669	82.59%	932	13.58%	263	3.83%	4,737	69.01%	6,864
Pope	13,158	75.39%	3,678	21.07%	618	3.54%	9,480	54.31%	17,454
Prairie	2,209	83.11%	386	14.52%	63	2.37%	1,823	68.59%	2,658
Pulaski	52,745	42.73%	67,503	54.69%	3,184	2.58%	-14,758	-11.96%	123,432
Randolph	4,160	79.31%	864	16.47%	221	4.21%	3,296	62.84%	5,245
Saline	30,900	71.73%	10,602	24.61%	1,574	3.65%	20,298	47.12%	43,076
Scott	2,497	84.64%	349	11.83%	104	3.53%	2,148	72.81%	2,950
Searcy	2,523	81.10%	426	13.69%	162	5.21%	2,097	67.41%	3,111
Sebastian	24,097	70.32%	8,926	26.05%	1,246	3.64%	15,171	44.27%	34,269
Sevier	2,888	79.71%	625	17.25%	110	3.04%	2,263	62.46%	3,623
Sharp	4,848	80.45%	979	16.25%	199	3.30%	3,869	64.21%	6,026
St. Francis	2,514	49.89%	2,424	48.10%	101	2.00%	90	1.79%	5,039
Stone	3,949	77.94%	932	18.39%	186	3.67%	3,017	59.54%	5,067
Union	7,926	68.33%	3,443	29.68%	230	1.98%	4,483	38.65%	11,599
Van Buren	4,861	77.93%	1,111	17.81%	266	4.26%	3,750	60.12%	6,238
Washington	37,336	53.01%	30,935	43.92%	2,160	3.07%	6,401	9.09%	70,431
White	18,497	80.24%	3,732	16.19%	823	3.57%	14,765	64.05%	23,052
Woodruff	1,376	66.28%	633	30.49%	67	3.23%	743	35.79%	2,076
Yell	4,264	81.03%	836	15.89%	162	3.08%	3,428	65.15%	5,262
Totals	592,437	65.73%	280,187	31.09%	28,682	3.18%	312,250	34.64%	901,306

==== Counties that flipped from Democratic to Republican ====
- Chicot (largest city: Dermott)
- Clark (largest city: Arkadelphia)
- Crittenden (largest city: West Memphis)
- Desha (largest city: Dumas)
- Lee (largest city: Marianna)
- St. Francis (largest city: Forrest City)
- Woodruff (largest city: Augusta)

==== By congressional district ====
Boozman won all four congressional districts.

District	Boozman	James	Representative
1st	72%	25%	Rick Crawford
2nd	59%	38%	French Hill
3rd	63%	33%	Steve Womack
4th	70%	27%	Bruce Westerman

== See also ==
- 2022 United States Senate elections
- 2022 United States House of Representatives elections in Arkansas
- 2022 Arkansas gubernatorial election
- 2022 Arkansas elections
