= 2011 Kansas State Wildcats football team =

American college football season

2011 Kansas State Wildcats football

Cotton Bowl Classic, L 16–29 vs. Arkansas
- Conference: Big 12 Conference

Ranking
- Coaches: No. 16
- AP: No. 15
- Record: 10–3 (7–2 Big 12)
- Head coach: Bill Snyder (20th season)
- Co-offensive coordinators: Dana Dimel (5th season); Del Miller (12th season)
- Offensive scheme: Multiple
- Defensive coordinator: Chris Cosh (3rd season)
- Base defense: 4–3
- Home stadium: Bill Snyder Family Football Stadium

2011 Big 12 Conference football standings
	Conf.			Overall
Team	W		L	W		L
No. 3 Oklahoma State $	8	–	1	12	–	1
No. 15 Kansas State	7	–	2	10	–	3
No. 13 Baylor	6	–	3	10	–	3
No. 16 Oklahoma	6	–	3	10	–	3
Missouri	5	–	4	8	–	5
Texas	4	–	5	8	–	5
Texas A&M	4	–	5	7	–	6
Iowa State	3	–	6	6	–	7
Texas Tech	2	–	7	5	–	7
Kansas	0	–	9	2	–	10
$ – BCS representative as conference champion; Rankings from AP Poll

The 2011 Kansas State Wildcats football team represented Kansas State University in the 2011 NCAA Division I FBS football season. The Wildcats played their home games at Bill Snyder Family Football Stadium, in Manhattan, Kansas as they have done since 1968. It was the 116th season in school history. The Wildcats were led by head coach Bill Snyder in his 20th overall and third straight season since returning for his second tenure in 2009. They are a member of the Big 12 Conference. After winning all three non-conference games (Eastern Kentucky, Kent State, Miami), the conference schedule began with a close victory at home over the Baylor Bears, and ended with a victory over the rival Iowa State Cyclones in the Farmageddon showdown. Kansas State made to a 7–0 start for first time since 1999. In the week 10 action, Kansas State earned a quadruple-overtime win over the Texas A&M Aggies. It was the first overtime game in school history since the 1998 Big 12 Championship Game, a game that also saw the Wildcats and Aggies play, which they lost 36–33 in double-overtime.

The 2011 Wildcats season finished with 10–3 overall, 7–2 Big 12 play, finished in second place, behind Oklahoma State. They were invited to the Cotton Bowl Classic for their third appearance, where they were defeated by Arkansas, Kansas State's first Cotton Bowl Classic loss since 1996 against BYU in the 1997 Cotton Bowl Classic.

== Off-season ==
Coming off a close loss in the 2010 Pinstripe Bowl, K-State's off-season was headlined by signing brothers Arthur and Bryce Brown, from Wichita East High School joining the team. Arthur, a transfer from Miami was expected to (and did) start at middle linebacker while Bryce, a transfer from Tennessee expected to see time at running back, but left the program after the first two games. Collin Klein was the starting quarterback for the team after the departure of Carson Coffman.

== Schedule ==
Date	Time	Opponent	Rank	Site	TV	Result	Attendance
September 3	6:00 p.m.	Eastern Kentucky*		Bill Snyder Family Football Stadium; Manhattan, KS	K-StateHD.TV	W 10–7	50,292
September 17	6:00 p.m.	Kent State*		Bill Snyder Family Football Stadium; Manhattan, KS	FCS	W 37–0	50,483
September 24	2:30 p.m.	at Miami (FL)*		Sun Life Stadium; Miami Gardens, FL	ESPNU	W 28–24	43,786
October 1	2:30 p.m.	No. 15 Baylor		Bill Snyder Family Football Stadium; Manhattan, KS	ABC/ESPN	W 36–35	49,399
October 8	2:30 p.m.	Missouri	No. 20	Bill Snyder Family Football Stadium; Manhattan, KS	ABC/ESPN3	W 24–17	48,435
October 15	6:00 p.m.	at Texas Tech	No. 17	Jones AT&T Stadium; Lubbock, TX	FSN	W 41–34	49,744
October 22	11:00 a.m.	at Kansas	No. 12	Memorial Stadium; Lawrence, KS (rivalry)	FSN	W 59–21	47,157
October 29	2:30 p.m.	No. 11 Oklahoma^{†}	No. 10	Bill Snyder Family Football Stadium; Manhattan, KS	ESPN	L 17–58	51,004
November 5	7:00 p.m.	at No. 3 Oklahoma State	No. 17	Boone Pickens Stadium; Stillwater, OK	ABC/ESPN2	L 45–52	58,277
November 12	2:30 p.m.	Texas A&M	No. 17	Bill Snyder Family Football Stadium; Manhattan, KS	ABC	W 53–50 ^{4OT}	46,204
November 19	7:00 p.m.	at Texas	No. 16	Darrell K Royal–Texas Memorial Stadium; Austin, TX	FX	W 17–13	100,705
December 3	11:30 a.m.	Iowa State	No. 16	Bill Snyder Family Football Stadium; Manhattan, KS (rivalry)	FSN	W 30–23	47,392
January 6, 2012	7:00 p.m.	vs. No. 7 Arkansas*	No. 11	Cowboys Stadium; Arlington, TX (Cotton Bowl Classic)	FOX	L 16–29	80,956
*Non-conference game; ^{†}Homecoming; Rankings from AP Poll released prior to the game; All times are in Central time

== Rankings ==
Ranking movements Legend: ██ Increase in ranking ██ Decrease in ranking — = Not ranked RV = Received votes
	Week															
Poll	Pre	1	2	3	4	5	6	7	8	9	10	11	12	13	14	Final
AP	—	—	—	—	RV	20	17	12	10	17	17	16	16	16	11	15
Coaches	—	—	—	—	RV	21	18	16	12	19	22	17	15	15	10	16
Harris	Not released						17	12	10	15	18	17	15	15	10	Not released
BCS	Not released							11	8	14	14	13	11	11	8	Not released

== Game summaries ==
=== Eastern Kentucky ===
	1	2	3	4	Total
Eastern Kentucky	0	0	7	0	7
Kansas State	0	0	3	7	10

K-State rallied late to defeat Eastern Kentucky 10–7 in front of a sellout crowd of 50,292. Collin Klein hit Chris Harper in the back of the end zone for a 33-yard touchdown pass with 1 minute, 39 seconds remaining that the Wildcats possessed a lead. K-State turned the ball over five times, needed 77 plays to gain 303 yards. Klein was sacked twice, and ended with a decent effort, completing 13 of 21 passes for 128 yards a touchdown and an interception while rushing for 78 yards on 25 carries. Running backs Angelo Pease, John Hubert and Bryce Brown all failed to consistently gain yardage. Though Hubert reeled off a few nifty runs and finished with 91 yards, Brown had difficulties. Brown played in his first game since transferring from Tennessee, managed 16 yards on three carries and set Eastern Kentucky up for its only score by fumbling in front of K-State's end zone.

The Wildcats' offensive struggles sent them into halftime tied 0–0, and put them behind 7–0 late in the third quarter when Jared McClain ran in a one-yard touchdown following Brown's fumble.

From there, the Wildcats did just enough to pull out the win. They drove into scoring position three times, with Anthony Cantele missing a 37-yard field goal attempt, then connecting on one from 36 yards out with 10:11 remaining to make the score 7–3.

K-State's defense, which played well and allowed 129 total yards, forced Eastern Kentucky to punt on its next possession and set Klein up for the game-winning score.

=== Kent State ===
	1	2	3	4	Total
Kent State	0	0	0	0	0
Kansas State	14	20	3	0	37

K-State was favored by 17½ going into the game.

K-State had their first shutout in more than five years as David Garrett returned an interception 45 yards for a first-quarter touchdown, and Collin Klein dazzled with his legs and the Wildcats blew out Kent State 37–0. K-State scored on five of six first-half drives to build a 34–0 lead and had the only scoring in the second half with a field goal.

Klein finished with 139 yards rushing and 74 yards passing, nearly becoming the first Kansas State quarterback since Allen Webb in 2004 to eclipse 100 yards in each category. He had a hand in all three touchdowns scored by the offense, two running and one passing. The Wildcats held the second-worst offense in the Football Bowl Subdivision to 12 first downs and 199 yards.

The Golden Flashes didn't do much to help themselves, committing 11 penalties for 136 yards. That included eight personal fouls, one of which spoiled a first-and-goal situation at the Kansas State 3 in the fourth quarter. The Wildcats managed to keep the Golden Flashes out of the end zone to secure their first shutout since beating Florida Atlantic 45–0 on Sept. 9, 2006.

The senior cornerback waited until Keith finally unloaded a looping pass toward Eric Adeyemi near the sideline. Garrett deftly

K-State had the first interception returned for a touchdown by Kansas State since Jeffrey Fitzgerald did it against Texas Tech on Oct. 10, 2009.

=== Miami ===
	1	2	3	4	Total
Kansas State	7	7	7	7	28
Miami	3	0	14	7	24

Miami was favored by 13 going into the game.

K-State's victory was the Wildcats’ first road non-conference win since Bill Snyder began his second stint as coach.

Tre Walker made a game saving tackle at the two-yard line to preserve a 28–24 victory. On 4th and 1, with under a minute, Walker tackled Jacory Harris. Initially called a touchdown, officials overturned the call and K-State took possession of the ball with 45 seconds remaining. K-State ran two QB keepers, while Miami used the last of its two timeouts, and then Collin Klein took a knee to run out the remainder of the game clock and seal the victory for the wildcats

Collin Klein rushed 22 times, often up the middle of the Hurricanes’ defense, for 93 yards and a touchdown while also completing 12 of 18 passes for 133 yards and two touchdowns.

Helping him was the improved blocking of K-State's offensive line and the John Hubert's consistency at running, having a breakthrough performance with a career-high 166 yards and a touchdown in 18 attempts.

In addition Nigel Malone had his third interception in as many games making him one of only 7 FBS players to average one interception per game.

While much of the preseason talk at running back revolved around hyped transfer Bryce Brown, it is Hubert who is emerging as the team's go-to runner.

This game also marked the second consecutive season of K-State being undefeated entering into conference play. It also marked K-State's second consecutive season of going undefeated in non-conference play.

This game also marked K-State's first win over a team currently in the ACC conference. (note: Syracuse was admitted to the ACC on September 18, and K-State had previously beaten Syracuse in the 1997 Fiesta Bowl.)

=== Baylor ===
	1	2	3	4	Total
#16 Baylor	7	14	14	0	35
Kansas State	13	6	7	10	36

Baylor was favored by 3.

Arthur Brown picked off Baylor's star quarterback, Robert Griffin III in the closing minutes Saturday, setting up a 31-yard field goal by Anthony Cantele that sent unbeaten Kansas State to a 36–35 upset over the number 15 Bears.

Collin Klein threw for 146 yards and two touchdowns and added 113 yards and another score for the Wildcats, who won their third straight Big 12 opener; this one in dramatic fashion.

Kansas State trailed 35–26 midway through the fourth quarter when Klein engineered a 13-play, 70-yard drive that he capped with a short touchdown plunge.

Cantele, who missed earlier in the game from 42 yards, hit the go-ahead field goal with 3:10 left to set off a raucous celebration at Bill Snyder Family Football Stadium.

Griffin finished 23 of 31 for 346 yards and five touchdowns and very costly interception that sealed the Wildcats' victory.

Most of Griffin's offense was directed at Kendall Wright, who caught nine passes for a school-record 201 yards and three TDs. Gerald McNeil had held the previous record since 1981.

None of the Bears’ five scoring drives took more than 2 minutes, 36 seconds, even though all of them covered at least 48 yards. That included a two-play, 75-yard drive that took all of 20 seconds late in the first half that gave them a 21–19 lead at the break.

K-State beat a ranked team for the first time since the 2007 team, when they beat number 4-ranked Texas.

=== Missouri ===
	1	2	3	4	Total
Missouri	0	3	0	14	17
#21 Kansas State	10	0	7	7	24

The Missouri Tigers were favored by 3.

Collin Klein had three touchdowns rushing for the number 20 Wildcats, who nearly blew a big second-half lead against Missouri before holding on for a 24–17 victory and their first 5–0 start since 2000.

Klein finished with 157 yards of total offense and John Hubert added 126 yards on the ground for the Wildcats, who had lost the last five matchups between the Big 12 rivals.

James Franklin was 19 of 35 for 214 yards passing for the Tigers, who came into the game averaging more than 500 yards of total offense. They only managed 326 against the Wildcats, most of that coming on a pair of long touchdown drives in the fourth quarter.

The first was 79-yard drive that Henry Josey finished with a 2-yard run to get the Tigers within 24–10. The Wildcats promptly went three-and-out, and Franklin led Missouri on a 74-yard drive that he finished off with a plunge from a yard out with 5:02 left in the game.

Tight end Michael Egnew fumbled after a catch on the drive, but a video review gave the ball back to Missouri. It was one of four calls by the officiating crew that were overturned.

Missouri never got another chance with the ball.

Klein bailed them out with a long touchdown pass in the closing minutes against Eastern Kentucky, the defense delivered a goal-line stand to beat Miami, and last week Kansas State scored 10 unanswered points in the final 5 1/2 minutes to stun then-number 15 Baylor.

On Missouri's first offensive play of the game, Franklin dropped back to pass, looked over the middle and threw right to Wildcat defensive back Ty Zimmerman, who had deftly stepped in front of the intended receiver. The interception ended a stretch of 108 consecutive passes without throwing a pick for the sophomore quarterback.

It took Kansas State six plays to punch it into the end zone.

By the time the first quarter drew to a close, the Tigers had exactly zero yards of total offense—20 yards through the air and minus-20 on the ground.

Henry Josey finally got things rolling for Missouri in the second quarter, using his quick feet to spring for a couple of long runs. But a false start inside the 10-yard line on second down pushed the Tigers back and they had to settle for Grant Ressel's 32-yard field goal.

Ressel had a chance to get Missouri within 10–6 at the break, but he pushed a 43-yard attempt wide right on the final play of the half as rain started to fall.

Missouri cost itself later in the quarter when Darvin Ruise was called for roughing the kicker after the Tigers had forced Kansas State to punt. The penalty gave Kansas State the ball back and Hubert went to work. After taking a handoff deep in the backfield, he did his best Darren Sproles imitation and spun away from a defender, taking the ball all the way down to the 3.

Klein scored seconds later for a 17–3 lead.

Klein added a short TD plunge on the Wildcats' ensuing possession, and although Missouri managed to make the game close with a couple late touchdowns, the lead was too much to overcome.

It was K-State's first game being ranked since 2007.

=== Texas Tech ===
	1	2	3	4	Total
#18 Kansas State	7	13	14	7	41
Texas Tech	7	21	3	3	34

Kansas State came into this game as 3 and a half point underdogs. The Red Raiders had a 5-game win streak over the Wildcats and had not lost at home to the Cats since 1999. The Wildcats defense started making big plays at the very beginning as Nigel Malone took an interception back for a touchdown. The Wildcats had a very good game in special teams play as Rapheal Guidry blocked two Donnie Carona field goals and Tyler Lockett, the son and nephew of K-State greats Kevin Lockett and Aaron Lockett, returned a kickoff 100 yards for a touchdown. Collin Klein had his second 100+ yards passing and 100+ yards rushing game of the season. Seth Doege turned the ball over 4 times in the loss, the first being the Nigel Malone pick six, the second being a fumble forced by Meshak Williams, the third being an interception by Tysyn Hartman, and the fourth being an interception by David Garrett. This was the fourth straight game that the Wildcats won as underdogs. This was also the second straight week that the Wildcats ended a 5-game losing streak to another team.

=== Kansas ===
	1	2	3	4	Total
#12 Kansas State	7	24	21	7	59
Kansas	0	14	0	7	21

K-State was an 11½ point favorite going into the game. K-State was able to beat their in-state rivals for the third straight time and for the 15th time in the last 19 match-ups. Tyler Lockett returned the second half kick-off for a touchdown and the route was on. K-State scored 59 points in Lawrence for the second year in a row.

=== Oklahoma ===
	1	2	3	4	Total
#9 Oklahoma	14	9	21	14	58
#8 Kansas State	3	14	0	0	17

Oklahoma was a 13½ point favorite before the game. Oklahoma led 23–17 at halftime, giving the Wildcats hope of an upset. In the second half however, Oklahoma scored 35 points and K-State was shut out. K-State's last regular season victory over the Sooners was in 1997.

=== Oklahoma State ===
	1	2	3	4	Total
#17 Kansas State	10	14	7	14	45
#3 Oklahoma State	14	13	7	18	52

Oklahoma State was a 21-point favorite before the game. In a sea-saw battle, K-State had three chances to score the game-tying touchdown in the fourth quarter. K-State had the ball near the end zone and ran three pass plays in the final 12 seconds of the game, all three falling incomplete. It was the Wildcats' second loss in a row.

=== Texas A&M ===
	1	2	3	4	OT	2OT	3OT	4OT	Total
Texas A&M	0	14	7	10	7	3	6	3	50
#17 Kansas State	0	14	0	17	7	3	6	6	53

After dropping two straight games to Oklahoma and Oklahoma State the Wildcats returned home to face a struggling Texas A&M team that had lost their last two games. The two offenses were kept quiet in the first quarter with only one drive of over 20 yards. The Aggies wasted no time in the second quarter though jumping out to 14-point lead within the first 4 minutes on a Ryan Tannehill to Ryan Swope touchdown pass and a Jemeill Showeres rushing touchdown. K-State would not go away though as the wildcats would score on two Collin Klein rushing touchdowns to tie the game at 14, a score that would last until halftime. Texas A&M would score the only points of the third quarter off a 10-yard Cyrus Gray rushing touchdown. The Wildcats would answer back though with another rushing touchdown from Collin Klein. The Aggies then scored 10 unanswered points from a Cyrus Gray touchdown and a Randy Bullock field goal. But Collin Klein and K-State quickly responded with a 53 touchdown pass to Chris Haper to bring the cats within 3. K-State's defense then came up big stop as they held the Aggies to 3 plays, 2 yards and 1 minute of possession. The Wildcats would then drive 41 yards to set up a 44-yard game-tying field goal by Anthony Cantele. The Aggies and Wildcats would then each have one drive where both failed to drive the ball, sending the game into overtime. The Wildcats would score first in OT as Tramaine Thompson would recover a Collin Klein fumble in the endzone for a touchdown. The Aggies would then score a touchdown to force a second overtime. In their next possessions the Aggies and Wildcats could only score field goals as the game advanced to a third overtime. In their third possession K-State would score on a 25-yard touchdown run by Collin Klein. Texas A&M would then answer back with a Ryan Tannehill touchdown pass. In the fourth overtime the Aggies would score on a Randy Bullock field goal but it would not be enough as Collin Klein would win the game on a 1-yard touchdown run.

=== Texas ===
	1	2	3	4	Total
#16 Kansas State	3	7	7	0	17
Texas	0	3	7	3	13

Texas was a 9-point favorite before the game. K-State continued their dominance over Texas winning another close game. The Wildcats have beaten the Longhorns four times in a row. K-State has beaten Texas 6 out of 8 times since the formation of the Big 12, and the Wildcats hold the distinction of being the only Big 12 team to hold a winning record against Texas since the start of Big 12 play in 1996.

=== Iowa State ===
	1	2	3	4	Total
Iowa State	13	0	7	3	23
#16 Kansas State	7	10	3	10	30

K-State was favored by 11 heading to the game. After the game was delayed nearly two hours due to inclement weather, K-State yet again found another way to win a close game. Iowa State was looking for their seventh win, while K-State was looking to secure their first double-digit win season since the 2003 team. K-State won the game and would later find out their bowl invitation to play in the Cotton Bowl Classic.

=== 2012 Cotton Bowl Classic vs. Arkansas ===
	1	2	3	4	Total
#11 Kansas State	0	9	7	0	16
#7 Arkansas	3	16	7	3	29

Arkansas was favored 7 points going to the game.

Arkansas and Kansas State are met for the first time in postseason and for the fifth time overall. The previous game was since 1967, and the Wildcats lost 28–7. K-State was uncharacteristically sloppy, dropping passes and making other mistakes. Arkansas built a 19–9 lead before K-State showed life, pulling within 3, making the game 19–16. The Wildcats were not able to continue to momentum, and lost 29–16.

== Roster ==
2011 roster
Quarterbacks: 4 Daniel Sams – Fr.; 7 Collin Klein – Jr.; 9 Justin Tuggle – Jr.; 13 Sammuel Lamur – Sr.; 15 Sam Johnson – Fr.; 16 Joe Hubener – Fr.; 19 Keaton Lewis – Fr.; Running backs: 8 Bryce Brown – So.; 20 DeMarcus Robinson – Fr.; 28 Robert Rose – So.; 29 Angelo Pease – Jr.; 33 John Hubert – So.; 43 Ryan Smith – Sr.; Full backs: 27 Brad Duncan – Fr.; 34 Aaron Norris – Fr.; 36 Ben Kall – Jr.; 37 Braden Wilson – Jr.; 39 Jay Hanley – Jr.; Wide receivers: 2 Stephen Johnson – So.; 3 Chris Harper – Jr.; 5 Brodrick Smith – Jr.; 14 Curry Sexton – Fr.; 16 Tyler Lockett – Fr.; 17 Cole Bachamp – Sr.; 21 Destin Mosley – Fr.; 22 Zach McFall – Jr.; 24 Rodney Kenner – Sr.; 25 Greyson Hughes – Fr.; 26 Cody Harrison – Fr.; 30 Stanton Weber – Fr.; 83 Ed Brown – Fr.; 86 Tramaine Thompson – So.; 87 Sheldon Smith – Sr.; 88 Torell Miller So.; 89 Aubrey Quarles – Sr.; Tight ends: 18 Andre McDonald – So.; 41 Logan Haug – Fr.; 47 William Green – Jr.; 80 Travis Tannahill – Jr.; 81 Jeremy Sutton – Jr.; 82 Tyler Davidson – Fr.; 84 Curtis Hubbell – Jr.; 85 Zach Trujillo – Fr.; 89 Zach Nemechek – Fr.	Offensive line: 44 Chandler Smith – Fr. (long snapper); 50 Nick Puetz – Jr.; 51 Cameron McLain – Fr.; 52 John McClure – Fr.; 54 Trevor Viers – Sr.; 59 Zach Kendall – Sr.; 61 Drew Liddle – Fr.; 62 Logan Wiltfong – Fr.; 63 Marcus Heit – Fr. (long snapper); 64 Tomasi Mariner -Fr.; 65 Mike Powell – Jr.; 66 B. J. Finney - Fr.; 67 Kenneth Mayfield – Sr.; 68 William Cooper – Fr.; 69 Nick Ward – Jr.; 70 Zach Hanson – Jr.; 71 Ethan Douglas – So.; 72 Kaleb Drinkgern – Jr.; 73 Manese Foteki- Jr.; 74 Wade Weibert – Sr.; 75 Clyde Aufner – Jr.; 76 Jordan Allred – So.; 77 Colten Freeze – Jr.; 78 Cornelius Lucas – Fr.; 79 Keneen Taylor – Fr.; Defensive line: 40 Antonio Felder – Sr.; 42 Meshak Williams – Jr.; 46 Prizell Brown – Sr.; 52 Matt Bowman – Fr.; 54 Taylor Godinet – Fr.; 57 Jordan Voelker – Jr.; 60 Dustin Sobieraj – Jr.; 62 Logan Wiltfong – Fr.; 72 Ryan Muller – Fr.; 73 Oladipo Fajimolu – Jr.; 90 Laton Dowling – Fr.; 91 Brandon Harold – (redshirt) So.; 92 Josh Sutton – Jr.; 93 Eric Diesel – Jr.; 94 Raphael Guidry – Jr.; 95 Ray Kibble – Jr.; 96 Payton Kirk – Jr.; 97 Adam Davis – Jr.; 98 Ethan Reinke – Fr.; 99 Javonta Boyd – Jr.	Linebackers: 6 Tate Snyder – Fr.; 20 Riley Williams – Fr.; 26 Jarell Childs – So.; 32 Roman Fiels – Fr.; 33 Weston Hiebert – Fr.; 34 Cody Marley – Fr.; 36 Nick Briney – So.; 37 David Smith – Fr.; 39 Jonathan Truman – Fr.; 40 Antonio Felder – Jr.; 44 Josh Berard – Sr.; 45 Kevin Rohlder – Sr.; 4 Arthur Brown – (redshirt) Jr.; 47 Jared Loomis – Jr.; 48 Jarett Wright – Sr.; 49 Mitchell Roberts – Fr.; 50 Tre Walker – Fr.; 51 Blake Martin – Fr.; 52 Taylor Kuhlman – Fr.; 53 Blake Slaughter – So.; 55 Kadero Terrell – Jr.; 56 Alex Hrebec – Jr.; 58 Clarence Bumpas – Fr.; 59 Brian Hertzog – Jr.; Defensive backs: 2 Tysyn Hartman – Jr.; 8 Stephen Harrison – Sr.; 10 Kelo Webster – Fr.; 12 Ty Zimmerman – Fr.; 15 Randall Evans – Fr.; 16 Terrance Sweeney – Sr.; 21 Troy Butler – Sr.; 22 Thomas Ferguson – So.; 23 Emmanuel Lamur – Sr.; 24 Dahrnaz Tigner – Jr.; 25 Joseph Bonugli – Fr.; 27 David Garrett – Jr.; 28 Logan Dold – Jr.; 29 Tanner Burns – Jr.; 30 Drew Mueller – Fr.; 31 Thomas Hankerson – So.; 32 Roman Fields – Fr.; 35 Ian Peters – So.; 38 Matthew Pearson – Jr.; 41 Charles Melton – Fr.; 43 Marc St. Felix – Jr.; Punters: 9 Ryan Doerr – So.; Kickers: 6 Brandon Klimek – (redshirt) So.; 10 Anthony Cantele – So.; 14 Evan Engwall- So.; 19 Josh Cherry – So.

== Coaching staff ==
The following is a list of coaches at Kansas State for the 2011 season.

Name	Position	Seasons at Kansas State	Alma mater
Bill Snyder	Head coach	20	William Jewell (1963)
Chris Cosh	Assistant head coach/Co-defensive Coordinator	5	Virginia Tech (1983)
Tom Hayes	Defensive Passing Game Coordinator/defensive backs	1	Iowa (1971)
Joe Bob Clements	Defensive ends	10	Kansas State (1999)
Mo Latimore	Interior Defensive Line	28	Kansas State (1976)
Sean Snyder	Associate head coach/special teams Coordinator	17	Kansas State (1994)
Dana Dimel	Co-offensive Coordinator/running backs/tight ends	14	Kansas State (1986)
Del Miller	Co-offensive Coordinator/quarterbacks	11	Central (1972)
Charlie Dickey	Offensive line	3	Arizona (1987)
Michael Smith	Wide receivers	15	Kansas State (1995)
Joe Gordon	Recruiting Operations	1	Sam Houston State (1999)

== Recruiting ==
The following is a list of the recruits that are on the 2011 roster.

College recruiting
Name	Hometown	School	Height	Weight	40^{‡}	Commit date
Ian Seau; DE	Carlsbad, CA	La Costa Canyon High School	6 ft 3 in (1.91 m)	235 lb (107 kg)	4.7	Jan 30, 2011
Ian Seau; DE	Recruit ratings: Scout: Rivals: (80)					
Lamonte Clark; DT	Washington D.C.	Ballou Senior	6 ft 4 in (1.93 m)	310 lb (140 kg)		Jun 29, 2010
Lamonte Clark; DT	Recruit ratings: Scout: Rivals: (78)					
Sam Harvill; DT	Springdale, AR	Shiloh Christian School	6 ft 0 in (1.83 m)	254 lb (115 kg)	4.9	Apr 26, 2010
Sam Harvill; DT	Recruit ratings: Scout: Rivals: (78)					
Hunter Davis; DE	Choctaw, OK	Choctaw High School	6 ft 4 in (1.93 m)	244 lb (111 kg)		Jan 26, 2011
Hunter Davis; DE	Recruit ratings: Scout: Rivals: (78)					
Brandon Mickens; DE	League City, TX	Clear Springs High School	6 ft 3 in (1.91 m)	205 lb (93 kg)		Aug 10, 2009
Brandon Mickens; DE	Recruit ratings: Scout: Rivals: (77)					
Kason Hostrup; OT	Sachse, TX	Sachse High School	6 ft 4 in (1.93 m)	285 lb (129 kg)		Jun 17, 2009
Kason Hostrup; OT	Recruit ratings: Rivals: (77)					
Mike Moore; OLB	Dallas, TX	Skyline High School	6 ft 1 in (1.85 m)	213 lb (97 kg)		Jan 31, 2011
Mike Moore; OLB	Recruit ratings: Scout: Rivals: (77)					
Dante' Barnett; ATH	Tulsa, OK	Booker T. Washington High School	6 ft 0 in (1.83 m)	164 lb (74 kg)	4.5	Jan 24, 2011
Dante' Barnett; ATH	Recruit ratings: Scout: Rivals: (76)					
Marquel Bryant; DE	Dallas, TX	Skyline High School	6 ft 3 in (1.91 m)	213 lb (97 kg)		Aug 1, 2010
Marquel Bryant; DE	Recruit ratings: Scout: Rivals: (75)					
Dillon Wilson; K	Midlothian, TX	Midlothian High School	6 ft 0 in (1.83 m)	175 lb (79 kg)		Jul 2, 2010
Dillon Wilson; K	Recruit ratings: Scout: Rivals: (75)					
Cody Whitehair; OT	Abilene, KS	Abilene High School	6 ft 4 in (1.93 m)	300 lb (140 kg)	5.2	Nov 14, 2009
Cody Whitehair; OT	Recruit ratings: Scout: Rivals: (74)					
Tyler Lockett; WR	Tulsa, OK	Booker T. Washington High School	5 ft 10 in (1.78 m)	165 lb (75 kg)		Apr 28, 2010
Tyler Lockett; WR	Recruit ratings: Scout: Rivals: (74)					
Destin Mosley; ATH	Jefferson, TX	Jefferson High School	5 ft 9 in (1.75 m)	175 lb (79 kg)	4.4	
Destin Mosley; ATH	Recruit ratings: Scout: Rivals: (74)					
Daniel Sams; ATH	Slidell High School	Salem High School	6 ft 1 in (1.85 m)	204 lb (93 kg)	4.3	Mar 8, 2010
Daniel Sams; ATH	Recruit ratings: Scout: Rivals: (73)					
Jade Cathy; WR	Liberal, KS	Liberal High School	6 ft 4 in (1.93 m)	185 lb (84 kg)		Apr 30, 2010
Jade Cathy; WR	Recruit ratings: Scout: Rivals: (73)					
Kyle Klein; QB	Loveland, CO	Loveland High School	6 ft 4 in (1.93 m)	215 lb (98 kg)	4.6	Jan 24, 2010
Kyle Klein; QB	Recruit ratings: Scout: Rivals: (71)					
Boston Stiverson; OG	Andover, KS	Andover Central High School	6 ft 3 in (1.91 m)	290 lb (130 kg)	5.9	Aug 6, 2010
Boston Stiverson; OG	Recruit ratings: Scout: Rivals: (71)					
Morgan Burns; ATH	Wichita, KS	Trinity Academy	5 ft 10 in (1.78 m)	190 lb (86 kg)		Jan 31, 2011
Morgan Burns; ATH	Recruit ratings: Scout: Rivals: (68)					
Glenn Gronkowski; WR	Williamsville, New York	Williamsville North High School	6 ft 2 in (1.88 m)	205 lb (93 kg)		Jan 23, 2011
Glenn Gronkowski; WR	Recruit ratings: Scout: Rivals: (68)					
Tyler Davidson; TE	Jenks, OK	Jenks High School	6 ft 4 in (1.93 m)	225 lb (102 kg)		Jan 31, 2011
Tyler Davidson; TE	Recruit ratings: Scout: Rivals: (45)					
Travis Green; S	Omaha, NE	North High School	6 ft 0 in (1.83 m)	190 lb (86 kg)		Sep 17, 2009
Travis Green; S	Recruit ratings: (45)					
Curry Sexton; WR	Abilene, Kansas	Abilene High School	6 ft 0 in (1.83 m)	190 lb (86 kg)		Jan 31, 2011
Curry Sexton; WR	Recruit ratings: (45)					
Steven West; WR	Keller, TX	Fossil Ridge High School	6 ft 0 in (1.83 m)	190 lb (86 kg)	4.5	Jan 31, 2011
Steven West; WR	Recruit ratings: (45)					
Overall recruit ranking: Scout: 98 Rivals: 62
Note: In many cases, Scout, Rivals, 247Sports, On3, and ESPN may conflict in their listings of height and weight.; In these cases, the average was taken. ESPN grades are on a 100-point scale.; Sources: "2011 Kansas State Football Commits". Rivals.; "2011 Kansas State Football Commits". Scout.; "ESPN". ESPN.; "Scout.com Team Recruiting Rankings". Scout.; "2011 Team Ranking". Rivals.com.
