= Mitchell Loewen =

American football player (born 1993)

No. 70, 88
- Position: Tight end

Personal information
- Born: February 14, 1993 (age 33); Lahaina, Hawaii, U.S.
- Listed height: 6 ft 5 in (1.96 m)
- Listed weight: 275 lb (125 kg)

Career information
- High school: Lahainaluna (Lahaina)
- College: Arkansas
- NFL draft: 2016: undrafted

Career history
- New Orleans Saints (2016–2018); Detroit Lions (2018); New Orleans Saints (2019)

Career NFL statistics
- Total tackles: 2
- Stats at Pro Football Reference

Mitchell Loewen (born February 14, 1993) is an American former professional football player who was a tight end in the National Football League (NFL). He played college football for the Arkansas Razorbacks. He signed as an undrafted free agent with the New Orleans Saints in 2016.

== High school ==
Loewen attended Lahainaluna High School in Lahaina, Hawai'i. He is son of former NFL offensive lineman Chuck Loewen, who played for the San Diego Chargers from 1980 to 1984.

== Professional career ==
Pre-draft measurables
Height	Weight	Arm length	Hand span	Bench press
6 ft 3 1/4 in (1.91 m)	275 lb (125 kg)	34 1/8 in (0.87 m)	9 7/8 in (0.25 m)	30 reps
All values from Pro Day

=== New Orleans Saints ===
Loewen signed with the New Orleans Saints as an undrafted free agent on May 2, 2016. He was placed on the reserve/non-football injury list on June 6, 2016, prematurely ending his rookie season.

In Week 2 against the Patriots, Loewen suffered a high-ankle sprain and was placed on injured reserve on September 20, 2017.

On December 27, 2018, Loewen was waived by the Saints.

=== Detroit Lions ===
On December 28, 2018, Loewen was claimed off waivers by the Detroit Lions. He was released during final roster cuts on August 30, 2019.

=== New Orleans Saints (second stint) ===
On September 1, 2019, Loewen was signed to the New Orleans Saints practice squad. He was promoted to the active roster on September 9, 2019. He was waived on September 10 and re-signed to the practice squad. He signed a reserve/future contract with the Saints on January 7, 2020.

When Loewen changed positions from defensive end to tight end during the 2019 season, he switched his jersey number to 88.

On May 15, 2020, the Saints waived Loewen.
