= Joe Adams (wide receiver) =

American gridiron football player (born 1989)

No. 15
- Positions: Wide receiver, kickoff returner

Personal information
- Born: November 22, 1989 (age 36); Little Rock, Arkansas, U.S.
- Listed height: 5 ft 11 in (1.80 m)
- Listed weight: 190 lb (86 kg)

Career information
- High school: Central Arkansas Christian (North Little Rock, Arkansas)
- College: Arkansas
- NFL draft: 2012: 4th round, 104th overall pick

Career history
- Carolina Panthers (2012); Edmonton Eskimos (2014)*; Houston Texans (2014)*; BC Lions (2014)*; Texas Revolution (2016–2019)
- * Offseason or practice squad member only

Awards and highlights
- Consensus All-American (2011); SEC Special Teams Player of the Year (2011); First-team All-SEC (2011); Second-team All-SEC (2009); Jet Award (2011); CIF champion (2017)

Career NFL statistics
- Receptions: 1
- Receiving yards: 7
- Return yards: 335
- Stats at Pro Football Reference

Joe Adams (born November 22, 1989) is an American former professional football player who was a wide receiver for the Carolina Panthers of the National Football League (NFL). He played college football for the Arkansas Razorbacks, earning consensus All-American honors in 2011. He was selected by the Panthers in the fourth round of the 2012 NFL draft.

== Early life ==
Adams was born in Little Rock, Arkansas. Encouraged by his mother Charlotte Allmon, he finished his secondary education at Central Arkansas Christian High School in North Little Rock, Arkansas.

== College career ==
Adams attended the University of Arkansas, where he played for the Razorbacks from 2008 to 2011. Initially, the four-star receiver had verbally committed to play for the USC Trojans, but switched to Arkansas after Bobby Petrino was hired in December 2007. Adams was a three-year starter at wide receiver, and a four-year starter as Arkansas' main punt returner. As a senior in 2011, he was recognized as a consensus first-team All-SEC player, as well as a consensus first-team All-American, after being named to the first-teams of ESPN, the Football Writers Association of America (FWAA), Pro Football Weekly, Scout.com, and Sporting News.

Adams was also the recipient of the inaugural Johnny "The Jet" Rodgers Return Specialist Award (Jet Award) in 2011, recognizing the best return specialist in all of college football. Adams returned 19 punts for 321 yards (16.9 yards per return) and 4 touchdowns (tops in the nation) in the 2011 season, helping the Razorbacks to an 11–2 record, and a victory over Kansas State in the 2012 Cotton Bowl. Adams also returned a punt 51 yards for a touchdown in the bowl game, the first punt returned for a score since former Arkansas player Lance Alworth returned one in the 1961 Cotton Bowl. However, Adams' most electrifying punt return came against the Tennessee Volunteers on November 12, 2011, in Fayetteville, Arkansas. Adams caught the punt on the Razorback 40-yard line, reversed his field numerous times, slipped seven tackle attempts, and wove his way through the Vols defenders for a sixty-yard return and six points. Arkansas won the game, 49–7. It is considered by some to be the most electrifying punt return in college football history.

== Professional career ==
Pre-draft measurables
Height	Weight	Arm length	Hand span	40-yard dash	10-yard split	20-yard split	20-yard shuttle	Three-cone drill	Vertical jump	Broad jump	Bench press
5 ft 10 5/8 in (1.79 m)	179 lb (81 kg)	31 7/8 in (0.81 m)	9 3/8 in (0.24 m)	4.46 s	1.51 s	2.58 s	4.18 s	7.09 s	38.0 in (0.97 m)	10 ft 3 in (3.12 m)	7 reps

=== Carolina Panthers ===
The Carolina Panthers selected Adams in the fourth round, 104th overall pick, of the 2012 NFL draft. He returned kicks in the first three games of the 2012 season before being benched after losing two fumbles in a game against the New York Giants. On August 27, Adams was waived by the Panthers.

=== Edmonton Eskimos ===
Adams signed with the Edmonton Eskimos of the Canadian Football League in 2014, but was released before the start of the season.

=== Houston Texans ===
The Houston Texans signed Adams on August 1, 2014. The Texans released Adams on August 25.

=== BC Lions ===
Adams was signed to the BC Lions' practice roster on October 20, 2014. He was released by the Lions on October 31.

=== Texas Revolution ===
On April 7, 2016, Adams signed with the Texas Revolution of Allen, Texas, a founding member of Champions Indoor Football, an indoor American football league. Adams re-signed with the Revolution on January 5, 2017.
