= Jerico Nelson =

American football player (born 1989)

Profile
- Position: Strong safety

Personal information
- Born: September 19, 1989 (age 37); Kenner, Louisiana, U.S.
- Listed height: 5 ft 13 in (1.85 m)
- Listed weight: 270 lb (122 kg)

Career information
- High school: Destrehan (LA)
- College: Arkansas
- NFL draft: 2012: undrafted

Career history
- New Orleans Saints (2012); Texas Revolution (2016–2017)

Awards and highlights
- CIF champion (2017)
- Stats at Pro Football Reference

Jerico Nelson (born September 19, 1989) is an American former football strong safety. Nelson signed with the New Orleans Saints as an undrafted free agent in 2012. Nelson played College football at Arkansas.

== Early life ==
Nelson, from New Sarpy, Louisiana, attended both John Curtis Christian School and later Destrehan High School in Destrehan, Louisiana. Nelson was ranked as 23rd athlete in the nation and was ranked as the 9th overall prospect in the state of Louisiana by Rivals.com. He also was ranked as the No. 51 running back in the nation by Scout.com.

College recruiting
Name	Hometown	School	Height	Weight	40^{‡}	Commit date
Jerico Nelson; Athlete	Destrehan, Louisiana	Destrehan High School	5 ft 10 in (1.78 m)	186 lb (84 kg)	4.45	Feb 1, 2008
Jerico Nelson; Athlete	Recruit ratings: Scout: Rivals:					
Overall recruit ranking: Scout: 51 (RB) Rivals: 23 (ATH), 9 (Louisiana)
‡ Refers to 40-yard dash; Note: In many cases, Scout, Rivals, 247Sports, On3, and ESPN may conflict in their listings of height, weight and 40 time.; In these cases, the average was taken. ESPN grades are on a 100-point scale.; Sources: "Arkansas Football Commitments". Rivals.; "2008 Arkansas Football Recruiting Commits". Scout.; "Scout.com Team Recruiting Rankings". Scout.; "2008 Team Ranking". Rivals.com.

== College career ==
He played College football at Arkansas. He finished college with 268 tackles, 10.5 Sacks, 4 Interceptions, 12 Pass Deflections, 2 Forced fumbles.

In his Freshman season, he finished with 37 tackles and 3.5 sacks.

In his Sophomore season, he finished the season with 74 Tackles, 2.5 Sacks, one Interception and a Forced fumble.

In his Junior season, he finished the season with 87 tackles, 2.5 Sacks, one Interception in which it was returned for a touchdown and a forced fumble.

In his Senior season, he finished his Senior season with 70 Tackles, 2 sacks and 4 pass deflections.

== Professional career ==
=== New Orleans Saints ===
On April 30, 2012, Nelson signed with the New Orleans Saints as an undrafted free agent. On August 31, 2012, he was released. On September 1, 2012, he was signed to the practice squad. On December 15, 2012, he was promoted to the active roster from the practice squad after the team placed safety Malcolm Jenkins and Offensive tackle Charles Brown on injured reserve.

=== Texas Revolution ===
On January 5, 2016, Nelson signed with the Texas Revolution. On January 3, 2017, Nelson re-signed with the Revolution.
