= Mo Isom =

American soccer player

Personal information
- Full name: Mary Morlan Aiken
- Date of birth: October 25, 1989 (age 37)
- Place of birth: Atlanta, Georgia
- Height: 6 ft 0 in (1.83 m)
- Position: Goalkeeper

Youth career
- 1996–2007: Atlanta Silverbacks
- 2005–2008: Lassiter Trojans

College career
Years	Team	Apps	(Gls)
2008–2011	LSU Tigers	73	(1)

International career
2009–2010	United States U23		

Mary Morlan "Mo" Isom (born October 25, 1989) is a former soccer player with the Louisiana State University Tigers. Isom holds the LSU all-time school record in women's soccer with 35 victories and 25 shutouts.

== Soccer ==
Isom competed at Lassiter High in Georgia. Her career record over three seasons was 40 wins, 9 losses and 1 tie. She was named The Atlanta Journal-Constitution player of the year as a senior. Isom was selected as one of the finalists for the 2011 Lowe's Senior CLASS Award for women's soccer. She had won the online fan voting for the honor, having earned more than 28 percent of the total vote.

=== NCAA ===
As a member of the Louisiana State Tigers women's soccer program, Isom was featured in Sports Illustrated magazine's Faces in the Crowd section. She appeared in the issue dated September 18, 2008. In her second game with the LSU Tigers, she scored a goal from 90 yards away. Of note, Isom was making her second career start for the Tigers, a 4-1 win against Brigham Young University.

== LSU football ==
Isom began training as a placekicker in January 2011. During the month of September 2011, she was seen practicing kickoffs at the LSU Tigers indoor training complex. From April to August 2011, she trained with senior snapper Joey Crappel and senior kicker DJ Howard. In the summer 2011, Isom informally participated in strength and conditioning with the football team. Although she did not kick in full pads, she tweeted that she made a 51-yard field goal while working out with Tigers kicker Drew Alleman and punter Brad Wing.

In the Tigers game versus Western Kentucky Hilltoppers in the 2011 LSU Tigers football team season, Isom was named Homecoming Queen at halftime in Tiger Stadium. Isom was the first athlete in LSU history to be recognized as Homecoming Queen.

On Tuesday, March 6, 2012 (the first day of spring tryouts for the LSU Tigers football), head coach Les Miles confirmed that Isom was among those participating in a tryout to be a placekicker with the football team. Isom was trying to be the second woman since Katie Hnida to play NCAA Division I football. During the spring tryouts, Isom was not selected to continue tryouts. However, she continued training for the position and tried again in August 2012. She again failed to make the team.

== Awards and honors ==
=== 2008 ===
- 2008 U-23 U.S. Women's National Team Camp
- 2008 Soccer Buzz Third-Team Freshman All-American
- 2008 Soccer Buzz Central Region All-Freshman Team
- 2008 SEC All-Freshman Team
- 2008 SEC Defensive Player of the Week (Sept. 2, Sept. 22)
- 2008 SEC Freshman of the Week (Sept. 2, Sept. 22)
- 2008 Soccer America Women's National Player of the Week (Sept. 2)
- 2008 Soccer America Women's National Team of the Week (Sept. 2)
- 2008 Soccer Buzz Women's Elite Team of the Week (Sept. 2)
- 2008 LSWA Louisiana Freshman of the Year
- 2008 LSWA First-Team All-Louisiana
- 2008 Lakeside Invitational Most Valuable Player

=== 2009 ===
- 2009 CollegeSoccer360.com Primetime Performer (Nov. 10)
- 2009 LSWA Honorable Mention All-Louisiana

=== 2010 ===
- 2010 Wilma Rudolph Student-Athlete Achievement Award
- 2010 SEC Academic Honor Roll

=== 2011 ===
- 2011 Lowe's Senior C.L.A.S.S. Award Finalist
- 2011 SEC Defensive Player of the Week (Sept. 19)
- 2011 LSWA First-Team All-Louisiana
- 2011 SEC Academic Honor Roll

== Personal ==
Isom grew up in Marietta, Georgia. As a six-foot-tall athlete in high school, Isom had issues with her image. Eventually, she suffered from bulimia, and would vomit up to 10 times a day. On January 3, 2009, Isom's father committed suicide in Huntsville, Alabama. Isom was involved in a car accident on November 25, 2009 that nearly took her life. While driving to her Georgia home from LSU, Isom lost control of her car. Her Jeep hit an embankment and it flipped three times before hitting a tree. Isom was in and out of consciousness as a result of the crash, but a passing retired Navy paramedic provided help. Isom publicly shares her story of encountering the Holy Spirit in the wreckage and placing her faith in Jesus Christ as a result. Following her recovery and the completion of her soccer career at LSU, as well as her time training with and trying out for the LSU football team, Isom began traveling both nationally and internationally sharing her story. She began a speaking ministry in 2012 and received national media attention for her story of adversity and faith, and her unique athletic journey. On February 11, 2014, Isom announced her engagement to her boyfriend of 15 months. On September 13, 2014 Isom wed Jeremiah Aiken and they welcomed their daughter, Auden, on December 11, 2015. In 2015, she signed a 2-book deal with Baker Publishing Group. Her first book, Wreck My Life: Journeying from Broken to Bold, released on August 2, 2016 and quickly became a New York Times Best Seller, debuting at #11 in the Sports category.

== Media ==
In November 2011, Isom appeared on the reality television series The Real Winning Edge. Isom appeared on The Ellen DeGeneres Show (original air date April 3, 2012).
