= 2011 Mississippi State Bulldogs football team =

American college football season

2011 Mississippi State Bulldogs football

Music City Bowl champion

Music City Bowl, W 23–17 vs. Wake Forest
- Conference: Southeastern Conference
- Western Division
- Record: 7–6 (2–6 SEC)
- Head coach: Dan Mullen (3rd season)
- Offensive coordinator: Les Koenning (3rd season)
- Offensive scheme: Multiple spread
- Defensive coordinator: Chris Wilson (2nd season)
- Co-defensive coordinator: Geoff Collins (1st season)
- Base defense: 4–3
- Home stadium: Davis Wade Stadium

2011 Southeastern Conference football standings
	Conf.			Overall
Team	W		L	W		L
Eastern Division
No. 19 Georgia x	7	–	1	10	–	4
No. 9 South Carolina	6	–	2	11	–	2
Florida	3	–	5	7	–	6
Vanderbilt	2	–	6	6	–	7
Kentucky	2	–	6	5	–	7
Tennessee	1	–	7	5	–	7
Western Division
No. 2 LSU x$	8	–	0	13	–	1
No. 1 Alabama %#	7	–	1	12	–	1
No. 5 Arkansas	6	–	2	11	–	2
Auburn	4	–	4	8	–	5
Mississippi State	2	–	6	7	–	6
Ole Miss*	0	–	8	2	–	10
Championship: LSU 42, Georgia 10
# – BCS National Champion; $ – BCS representative as conference champion; % – BCS at-large representative; x – Division champion/co-champions; * Ole Miss vacated all wins due to NCAA violations.; Rankings from AP Poll

The 2011 Mississippi State Bulldogs football team represented Mississippi State University in the 2011 NCAA Division I FBS football season. The team was coached by Dan Mullen, who was in his third season with Mississippi State. The Bulldogs played their home games at Davis Wade Stadium at Scott Field in Starkville, Mississippi and compete in the Western Division of the Southeastern Conference (SEC). They finished the 2011 season with a 7–6 overall play, 2–6 in SEC play, placing fifth in West Division, and were invited for Music City Bowl, where they defeated Wake Forest.

== Personnel ==
=== Coaching staff ===
In the week following the Gator Bowl victory, several changes were made to the Mississippi State coaching staff. Defensive coordinator and linebackers coach Manny Diaz resigned his position to serve in the same position for Texas as the replacement for Will Muschamp. Co-defensive coordinator and defensive line coach Chris Wilson was promoted to defensive coordinator to replace Diaz on January 10. At that time, Angelo Mirando was promoted from graduate assistant to wide receivers coach to replace Mark Hudspeth who had resigned earlier to accept the head coaching position at UL Lafayette. Geoff Collins was hired on January 12 to serve as co-defensive coordinator and linebackers coach to fill the vacant position made when Wilson was promoted.

Name	Position	Seasons at Mississippi State	Alma mater
Dan Mullen	Head coach	3	Ursinus (1994)
Geoff Collins	Defensive coordinator, Linebackers	1	Western Carolina (1992)
John Hevesy	Offensive line, Running Game Coordinator	3	Maine (1994)
Tony Hughes	Safeties, Recruiting Coordinator	3	Southern Miss (1980)
Greg Knox	Running Backs	3	Northeastern State (1986)
Les Koenning	Offensive coordinator, Quarterbacks	2	Texas (1981)
Angelo Mirando	Wide Receivers	1	Case Western Reserve (2008)
Scott Sallach	Tight Ends	3	Ursinus (1994)
Melvin Smith	Cornerbacks, Nickelbacks	1	Millsaps College (Unknown)
Chris Wilson	Defensive line	1	University of Oklahoma (1985)
Mark Ouimet	Coordinator of Recruiting Operations	2	Siena Heights University (1995)
Will Windham	Graduate assistant	1	Mississippi State University (2007)

=== Recruiting class ===
College recruiting information (2011)
Name	Hometown	School	Height	Weight	40^{‡}	Commit date
Dee Arrington; S	Wiggins, Mississippi	Stone High School	6 ft 2 in (1.88 m)	200 lb (91 kg)	4.62	Jul 24, 2010
Dee Arrington; S	Recruit ratings: Scout: Rivals: (78)					
Taveze Calhoun; S	Morton, Mississippi	Morton High School	6 ft 1 in (1.85 m)	180 lb (82 kg)	–	Jan 30, 2011
Taveze Calhoun; S	Recruit ratings: Scout: Rivals: (45)					
Justin Cox; CB	West Point, Mississippi	West Point High School	6 ft 1 in (1.85 m)	174 lb (79 kg)	4.41	Jul 24, 2010
Justin Cox; CB	Recruit ratings: Scout: Rivals: (74)					
Devin Fosselman; WR	Woodville, Mississippi	Wilkinson County High School	5 ft 9 in (1.75 m)	192 lb (87 kg)	–	Jun 20, 2010
Devin Fosselman; WR	Recruit ratings: Scout: Rivals: (75)					
John Harris; DE	Boynton Beach, Florida	Boynton Beach Community High School	6 ft 6 in (1.98 m)	220 lb (100 kg)	–	Nov 5, 2010
John Harris; DE	Recruit ratings: Scout: Rivals: (77)					
Zachary Jackson; S	Heidelberg, Mississippi	Heidelberg High School	6 ft 1 in (1.85 m)	203 lb (92 kg)	4.53	Feb 16, 2010
Zachary Jackson; S	Recruit ratings: Scout: Rivals: (76)					
P.J. Jones; DT	Tupelo, Mississippi	Tupelo High School	6 ft 3.5 in (1.92 m)	265 lb (120 kg)	–	Jan 21, 2011
P.J. Jones; DT	Recruit ratings: Scout: Rivals: (77)					
Daniel Knox; TE	Collinsville, Mississippi	West Lauderdale High School	6 ft 5 in (1.96 m)	251 lb (114 kg)	–	Jul 23, 2010
Daniel Knox; TE	Recruit ratings: Scout: Rivals: (77)					
James Maiden; OT	Woodville, Mississippi	Wilkinson County High School	6 ft 4 in (1.93 m)	265 lb (120 kg)	–	Jul 23, 2010
James Maiden; OT	Recruit ratings: Scout: Rivals: (77)					
Justin Malone; OT	Madison, Mississippi	Madison-Ridgeland Academy	6 ft 6 in (1.98 m)	306 lb (139 kg)	–	Nov 3, 2010
Justin Malone; OT	Recruit ratings: Scout: Rivals: (76)					
Kendrick Market; S	Batesville, Mississippi	South Panola High School	5 ft 9 in (1.75 m)	179 lb (81 kg)	–	Oct 17, 2010
Kendrick Market; S	Recruit ratings: Scout: Rivals: (72)					
Benardrick McKinney; OLB	Tunica, Mississippi	Rosa Fort High School	6 ft 4 in (1.93 m)	200 lb (91 kg)	–	Sep 16, 2010
Benardrick McKinney; OLB	Recruit ratings: Scout: Rivals: (73)					
Derek Milton; RB	Chatham, Virginia	Hargrave Military Academy	5 ft 11 in (1.80 m)	205 lb (93 kg)	–	Jan 24, 2011
Derek Milton; RB	Recruit ratings: Scout: Rivals: (75)					
Joe Morrow; WR	Ocean Springs, Mississippi	Ocean Springs High School	6 ft 4 in (1.93 m)	195 lb (88 kg)	4.60	Jul 23, 2010
Joe Morrow; WR	Recruit ratings: Scout: Rivals: (79)					
Shaquille Perry; RB	Walnut, Mississippi	Walnut Attendance Center	6 ft 2 in (1.88 m)	210 lb (95 kg)	–	Jan 19, 2011
Shaquille Perry; RB	Recruit ratings: Scout: Rivals: (72)					
Dak Prescott; QB	Haughton, Louisiana	Haughton High School	6 ft 3 in (1.91 m)	225 lb (102 kg)	4.70	Jul 23, 2010
Dak Prescott; QB	Recruit ratings: Scout: Rivals: (77)					
Nick Redmond; OT	Gulfport, Mississippi	Harrison Central High School	6 ft 5 in (1.96 m)	292 lb (132 kg)	–	Sep 26, 2009
Nick Redmond; OT	Recruit ratings: Scout: Rivals: (77)					
Josh Robinson; RB	Franklinton, Louisiana	Franklinton High School	5 ft 9 in (1.75 m)	205 lb (93 kg)	4.50	Jul 23, 2010
Josh Robinson; RB	Recruit ratings: Scout: Rivals: (68)					
Darius Slay; CB	Fulton, Mississippi	Itawamba Community College	6 ft 0 in (1.83 m)	190 lb (86 kg)	–	Jul 29, 2010
Darius Slay; CB	Recruit ratings: Scout: Rivals: (–)					
Preston Smith; DE	Stone Mountain, Georgia	Stephenson High School	6 ft 5 in (1.96 m)	215 lb (98 kg)	–	Sep 29, 2010
Preston Smith; DE	Recruit ratings: Scout: Rivals: (75)					
Joey Trapp; OT	Wilmington, California	Los Angeles Harbor College	6 ft 5 in (1.96 m)	285 lb (129 kg)	4.89	Dec 12, 2010
Joey Trapp; OT	Recruit ratings: Scout: Rivals: (–)					
Rufus Warren; TE	Indianola, Mississippi	Gentry High School	6 ft 5 in (1.96 m)	238 lb (108 kg)	–	Jun 15, 2010
Rufus Warren; TE	Recruit ratings: Scout: Rivals: (76)					
Overall recruit ranking: Scout: 44 Rivals: 44 ESPN: NR
‡ Refers to 40-yard dash; Note: In many cases, Scout, Rivals, 247Sports, On3, and ESPN may conflict in their listings of height, weight and 40 time.; In these cases, the average was taken. ESPN grades are on a 100-point scale.; Sources: "Scout.com Football Recruiting: Mississippi State". Scout.; "2011 Player Signees- Mississippi State". ESPN.; "Scout.com Team Recruiting Rankings". Scout.; "2011 Team Ranking". Rivals.com.

== Schedule ==
Date	Time	Opponent	Rank	Site	TV	Result	Attendance
September 1	7:00 pm	at Memphis*	No. 20	Liberty Bowl Memorial Stadium; Memphis, TN	SECRN	W 59–14	33,990
September 10	11:21 am	at Auburn	No. 16	Jordan–Hare Stadium; Auburn, AL	SECN	L 34–41	87,451
September 15	7:00 pm	No. 3 LSU	No. 25	Davis Wade Stadium; Starkville, MS (rivalry)	ESPN	L 6–19	56,924
September 24	6:00 pm	Louisiana Tech*		Davis Wade Stadium; Starkville, MS	ESPNU	W 26–20 ^{OT}	55,116
October 1	11:00 am	at Georgia		Sanford Stadium; Athens, GA	SECRN	L 10–24	92,746
October 8	11:00 am	at UAB*		Legion Field; Birmingham, AL	SECRN	W 21–3	28,351
October 15	11:21 am	No. 15 South Carolina		Davis Wade Stadium; Starkville, MS	SECN	L 12–14	55,418
October 29	6:00 pm	at Kentucky		Commonwealth Stadium; Lexington, KY	SECRN	W 28–16	57,891
November 5	6:30 pm	Tennessee–Martin*^{†}		Davis Wade Stadium; Starkville, MS	CSS	W 55–17	55,096
November 12	6:45 pm	No. 4 Alabama		Davis Wade Stadium; Starkville, MS (rivalry)	ESPN	L 7–24	57,871
November 19	2:30 pm	at No. 6 Arkansas		War Memorial Stadium; Little Rock, AR	CBS	L 17–44	55,761
November 26	6:00 pm	Ole Miss		Davis Wade Stadium; Starkville, MS (Egg Bowl)	ESPNU	W 31–3	55,270
December 30	5:40 pm	vs. Wake Forest*		LP Field; Nashville, TN (Music City Bowl)	ESPN	W 23–17	55,208
*Non-conference game; ^{†}Homecoming; Rankings from AP Poll released prior to the game; All times are in Central time

Schedule source:

== Rankings ==
Ranking movements Legend: ██ Increase in ranking ██ Decrease in ranking — = Not ranked
	Week															
Poll	Pre	1	2	3	4	5	6	7	8	9	10	11	12	13	14	Final
AP	20	16	25	—	—	—	—	—	—	—	—	—	—	—	—	—
Coaches	20	17	25	—	—	—	—	—	—	—	—	—	—	—	—	—
Harris	Not released						—	—	—	—	—	—	—	—	—	Not released
BCS	Not released							—	—	—	—	—	—	—	—	Not released

== Game summaries ==
=== 2011 Egg Bowl ===
Team	1	2	3	4	Total
Ole Miss	0	0	3	0	3
• Mississippi State	14	7	7	3	31

- Date: November 26
- Location: Davis Wade Stadium, Starkville, MS
- Game start: 7:00 p.m. EST
- Television network: ESPNU

Scoring summary
1	9:35	MSU	Vick Ballard 18 yard pass from Chris Relf (Derek Depasquale kick)	MSU 7-0
1	1:22	MSU	LaDarius Perkins 36 yard run (Derek Depasquale kick)	MSU 14-0
2	6:51	MSU	LaDarius Perkins 20 yard pass from Chris Relf (Derek Depasquale kick)	MSU 21-0
3	13:38	MSU	Vick Ballard 25 yard run (Derek Depasquale kick)	MSU 28-0
3	4:59	MISS	Byron Rose 28 yard field goal	MSU 28-3
4	12:03	MSU	Derek Depasquale 35 yard field goal	MSU 31-3

Mississippi State wore new uniforms for the game that featured gold numbers, gold shoes and "Hail State" replacing each of the player's last names on the back of the jersey.
