= 2011 Ole Miss Rebels football team =

American college football season

2011 Ole Miss Rebels football
- Conference: Southeastern Conference
- Western Division
- Record: 0–10, 2 wins vacated (0–8 SEC)
- Head coach: Houston Nutt (4th season)
- Offensive coordinator: David Lee (1st season)
- Offensive scheme: Multiple
- Defensive coordinator: Tyrone Nix (4th season)
- Base defense: 4–3
- Captains: Brandon Bolden; Wayne Dorsey; Derrick Herman; Kentrell Lockett; Bradley Sowell; Marcus Temple
- Home stadium: Vaught–Hemingway Stadium

2011 Southeastern Conference football standings
	Conf.			Overall
Team	W		L	W		L
Eastern Division
No. 19 Georgia x	7	–	1	10	–	4
No. 9 South Carolina	6	–	2	11	–	2
Florida	3	–	5	7	–	6
Vanderbilt	2	–	6	6	–	7
Kentucky	2	–	6	5	–	7
Tennessee	1	–	7	5	–	7
Western Division
No. 2 LSU x$	8	–	0	13	–	1
No. 1 Alabama %#	7	–	1	12	–	1
No. 5 Arkansas	6	–	2	11	–	2
Auburn	4	–	4	8	–	5
Mississippi State	2	–	6	7	–	6
Ole Miss*	0	–	8	2	–	10
Championship: LSU 42, Georgia 10
# – BCS National Champion; $ – BCS representative as conference champion; % – BCS at-large representative; x – Division champion/co-champions; * Ole Miss vacated all wins due to NCAA violations.; Rankings from AP Poll

The 2011 Ole Miss Rebels football team represented the University of Mississippi in the 2011 NCAA Division I FBS football season. The team was coached by Houston Nutt, who was in his fourth season. The Rebels played their home games at Vaught–Hemingway Stadium in Oxford, Mississippi, and competed in the Western Division of the Southeastern Conference (SEC). They finished the season 2–10, 0–8 in SEC play to finish in last place in the Western Division. On November 7, Nutt resigned as head coach effective at the end of the season.

On February 11, 2019, Ole Miss announced the vacation of all wins in the years 2010, 2011, 2012, and 2016. In 2013, all wins except the Music City Bowl were vacated. In 2014, all wins except the Presbyterian game were vacated.

== Personnel ==
=== Roster ===
2011 Ole Miss Rebels football team roster
Players
Coaches
Offense

Pos.	#	Name	Class
QB	1	Randall Mackey	RJr
WR	2	Nickolas Brassell	Fr
RB	3	Jeff Scott	So
RB	4	Nicholas Parker	RFr
WR	7	Tobias Singleton	Fr
QB	8	Zack Stoudt	Jr
WR	10	Vince Sanders	RFr
QB	11	Barry Brunetti	So
WR	12	Donte Moncrief	Fr
QB	13	Robert Ratliff	RSo
WR	16	Collins Moore	Fr
TE	17	Jamal Mosley	Jr
QB	19	Evan Ingram	RFr
RB	21	Zarold Wilder	Fr
WR	22	Philander Moore	So
RB	23	Tim Simon	So
RB	24	Houston Keyes	RFr
RB	25	Eric Dietz	Fr
WR	26	Derrick Herman	Sr
RB	27	Enrique Davis	Sr
WR	28	Korvic Neat	So
RB	29	Devin Thomas	Jr
RB	30	D'Lyle Washington	Fr
FB	33	E.J. Epperson	Jr
RB	34	Brandon Bolden	Sr
FB	35	Earnest Harmon	RFr
TE	36	John Peloza	RFr
WR	37	Matt Tarpley	So
FB	41	Billy Busch	So
FB	43	Taylor Rotenberry	Fr
FB	44	Charlie Scott	Fr
FB	45	H.R. Greer	Jr
TE	47	Sam Cox	Fr
FB	48	Justin Bigham	So
OL	50	Ethan Hutson	Fr
C	56	Evan Swindall	So
C	58	Corey Gaines	So
OL	63	Mitch Hall	Fr
C	65	Chase Hughes	RFr
OL	67	Chris Gill	So
OL	68	Justin Bell	Fr
OL	70	Emmanuel McCray	So
OL	72	Aaron Morris	Fr
G	73	Alex Washington	Sr
OL	74	Jared Duke	So
OL	75	Matt Hall	Jr
C	76	A.J. Hawkins	Jr
OL	77	Patrick Junen	So
OT	78	Bradley Sowell	Sr
OT	79	Bobby Massie	Jr
WR	80	Josh Pinkston	Fr
WR	81	Terrell Grant	So
TE	82	Dylan Dyer	So
WR	82	T.J. Worthy	Fr
TE	83	Ferbia Allen	Jr
WR	83	Jordan Holder	So
TE	84	Jack Nuismer	So
WR	85	Ja-Mes Logan	So
WR	86	Tyler Baker	Fr
TE	87	Alex Williams	So
WR	88	John Ratliff	Fr
TE	89	Layton Jones	Sr

Defense

Pos.	#	Name	Class
S	1	Damien Jackson	Sr
CB	3	Charles Sawyer	So
CB	4	Marcus Temple	Sr
S	5	Frank Crawford	So
CB	6	Wesley Pendleton	Jr
DE	7	Wayne Dorsey	Sr
DB	8	Denzel Nkemdiche	Fr
S	9	Ivan Nicholas	Jr
LB	10	C.J. Johnson	Fr
DB	12	Chief Brown	Fr
S	13	Brishen Mathews	So
LB	14	Serderius Bryant	Fr
LB	15	Joel Kight	Jr
DB	17	Tanner Burns	Jr
DB	20	Aaron Garbutt	Jr
DB	21	Senquez Golson	Fr
CB	23	Vincent Moss	Sr
LB	24	Keith Lewis	Fr
DB	25	Cody Prewitt	Fr
LB	27	Sam Noblin	RFr
CB	29	Abdul Bangura	Fr
CB	30	Kyle Horine	Jr
LB	31	Rudy Wilson	Jr
CB	33	Cliff Coleman	RFr
LB	38	D.T. Shackelford	Jr
S	39	Josh Shipp	Jr
DE	40	Kentrell Lockett	Sr
LB	44	Ralph Williams	RFr
LB	45	Josh Lancaster	Jr
LB	46	Tyriek Gracia	RFr
LB	49	Will Martin	So
LB	51	Ryan Collins	So
LB	52	Mike Marry	So
DE	53	Jason Jones	Jr
DE	54	Walker Sturgeon	RFr
DE	54	Carlos Thompson	So
DE	55	Cameron Whigham	So
DL	56	Woodrow Hamilton	Fr
DT	57	Terrell Brown	Jr
DE	90	Gerald Rivers	Jr
DT	92	Carlton Martin	RFr
DT	93	Justin Smith	Sr
DT	95	Bryon Bennett	RFr
DL	98	Uriah Grant	Jr
DT	98	Taurus Ward	RJr
DT	99	Gilbert Pena	Jr
DE		Josh Price	Fr

Special teams

Pos.	#	Name	Class
K	26	Ryan Nowicki	Fr
K	46	David Hankins	Sr
LS	59	Will Denny	RFr
LS	64	Jacob Hickman	So
K	81	Bryson Rose	Jr
P	94	Chris Conley	So
K	96	Andrew Ritter	Jr
P	97	Tyler Campbell	Jr

Head coach

- Houston Nutt

Coordinators/assistant coaches

- Gunter Brewer – Assoc. Head Coach/Passing Game Coord./Wide Receivers
- Keith Burns – Assistant Coach/Secondary
- David Lee – Assistant Coach/Offensive Coordinator/Quarterbacks
- Mike Markuson – Assistant Coach/Running Game Coordinator/Off. Line
- Derrick Nix – Assistant Coach/Running Backs
- Tyrone Nix – Assistant Head Coach/Def. Coordinator/Linebackers
- Terry Price – Assistant Coach/Defensive Line
- James Shibest – Assistant Coach/Special Teams Coordinator/Tight Ends
- Chris Vaughn – Assistant Coach/Recruiting Coordinator/ Safeties
- Bryan Brown – Defensive Graduate Assistant
- Alan Hensell – Offensive Graduate Assistant
- Mike Beaumont – Assistant Athletics Director for Football Operations
- Don Decker – Head Football Strength Coach
- Clifton Ealy – Assistant Athletics Director for Community Relations
- Danny Nutt – Assistant Athletics Director for Player Development
- Andy Commer – Coordinator of Video Services
- Ken Crain – Equipment Manager
- Tim Mullins – Head Athletic Trainer

Legend

- (C) Team captain
- (S) Suspended
- (I) Ineligible
- Injured
- Redshirt

Roster

=== Recruiting class ===
Ole Miss signed the No. 18 recruiting class according to Rivals and the No. 24 recruiting class according to Scout.

College recruiting (2011)
Name	Hometown	School	Height	Weight	40^{‡}	Commit date
Justin Bell; OG	Jackson, Mississippi	Callaway Senior High School	6 ft 3 in (1.91 m)	325 lb (147 kg)	–	Aug 27, 2010
Justin Bell; OG	Recruit ratings: Scout: Rivals: (75)					
Nickolas Brassell; WR	Batesville, Mississippi	South Panola High School	6 ft 1 in (1.85 m)	176 lb (80 kg)	4.40	Feb 2, 2011
Nickolas Brassell; WR	Recruit ratings: Scout: Rivals: (80)					
Chelarvez Brown; RB	Winona, Mississippi	Winona Secondary School	6 ft 1 in (1.85 m)	191 lb (87 kg)	4.50	Jun 12, 2010
Chelarvez Brown; RB	Recruit ratings: Scout: Rivals: (75)					
Serderius Bryant; OLB	Sanford, Florida	Seminole High School	5 ft 9 in (1.75 m)	205 lb (93 kg)	4.56	Jul 4, 2010
Serderius Bryant; OLB	Recruit ratings: Scout: Rivals: (79)					
Aaron Garbutt; S	Fullerton, California	Fullerton College	6 ft 2 in (1.88 m)	210 lb (95 kg)	4.50	Dec 24, 2010
Aaron Garbutt; S	Recruit ratings: Scout: Rivals: (–)					
Senquez Golson; CB	Pascagoula, Mississippi	Pascagoula High School	5 ft 10 in (1.78 m)	180 lb (82 kg)	4.40	Jul 21, 2010
Senquez Golson; CB	Recruit ratings: Scout: Rivals: (76)					
Uriah Grant; DT	Fullerton, California	Fullerton College	6 ft 1 in (1.85 m)	285 lb (129 kg)	5.00	Jan 23, 2011
Uriah Grant; DT	Recruit ratings: Scout: Rivals: (–)					
Mitch Hall; OT	Russellville, Arkansas	Russellville High School	6 ft 6 in (1.98 m)	320 lb (150 kg)	5.30	May 18, 2010
Mitch Hall; OT	Recruit ratings: Scout: Rivals: (78)					
Woodrow Hamilton; DT	Raleigh, Mississippi	Raleigh High School	6 ft 3 in (1.91 m)	272 lb (123 kg)	–	Jul 21, 2010
Woodrow Hamilton; DT	Recruit ratings: Scout: Rivals: (76)					
Ethan Hutson; OG	Destrehan, Louisiana	Destrehan High School	6 ft 4.5 in (1.94 m)	290 lb (130 kg)	5.40	Jun 25, 2010
Ethan Hutson; OG	Recruit ratings: Scout: Rivals: (78)					
C.J. Johnson; MLB	Philadelphia, Mississippi	Philadelphia High School	6 ft 2 in (1.88 m)	235 lb (107 kg)	4.60	Jan 25, 2011
C.J. Johnson; MLB	Recruit ratings: Scout: Rivals: (80)					
Keith Lewis; OLB	Tampa, Florida	Freedom High School	6 ft 2 in (1.88 m)	215 lb (98 kg)	4.55	Dec 22, 2010
Keith Lewis; OLB	Recruit ratings: Scout: Rivals: (78)					
Marcus Mayers; OLB	Taylorsville, Mississippi	Taylorsville High School	6 ft 2 in (1.88 m)	227 lb (103 kg)	–	Jul 23, 2010
Marcus Mayers; OLB	Recruit ratings: Scout: Rivals: (78)					
Maikhail Miller; QB	Fulton, Mississippi	Itawamba Agricultural High School	6 ft 2.5 in (1.89 m)	240 lb (110 kg)	–	Jul 19, 2010
Maikhail Miller; QB	Recruit ratings: Scout: Rivals: (79)					
Donte Moncrief; WR	Raleigh, Mississippi	Raleigh High School	6 ft 3 in (1.91 m)	212 lb (96 kg)	4.45	Jul 9, 2010
Donte Moncrief; WR	Recruit ratings: Scout: Rivals: (78)					
Collins Moore; WR	Madison, Alabama	Bob Jones High School	6 ft 2 in (1.88 m)	185 lb (84 kg)	4.50	Aug 8, 2010
Collins Moore; WR	Recruit ratings: Scout: Rivals: (75)					
Philander Moore; WR	Brenham, Texas	Blinn College	5 ft 10 in (1.78 m)	180 lb (82 kg)	4.40	Jan 7, 2011
Philander Moore; WR	Recruit ratings: Scout: Rivals: (–)					
Aaron Morris; OG	Jackson, Mississippi	Callaway Senior High School	6 ft 5 in (1.96 m)	316 lb (143 kg)	5.40	Aug 24, 2010
Aaron Morris; OG	Recruit ratings: Scout: Rivals: (78)					
Jamal Mosley; TE	Senatobia, Mississippi	Northwest Mississippi Community College	6 ft 4 in (1.93 m)	255 lb (116 kg)	–	Aug 24, 2010
Jamal Mosley; TE	Recruit ratings: Scout: Rivals: (–)					
Ivan Nicholas; S	New York, New York	ASA The College For Excellence	5 ft 11 in (1.80 m)	205 lb (93 kg)	4.50	Dec 5, 2010
Ivan Nicholas; S	Recruit ratings: Scout: Rivals: (–)					
Gilbert Pena; DT	New York, New York	ASA The College For Excellence	6 ft 4 in (1.93 m)	315 lb (143 kg)	–	Dec 15, 2010
Gilbert Pena; DT	Recruit ratings: Scout: Rivals: (–)					
Wesley Pendleton; CB	Wesson, Mississippi	Copiah-Lincoln Community College	5 ft 11 in (1.80 m)	175 lb (79 kg)	4.40	Dec 5, 2010
Wesley Pendleton; CB	Recruit ratings: Scout: Rivals: (–)					
Cody Prewitt; S	Bay Springs, Mississippi	Sylva Bay Academy	6 ft 3 in (1.91 m)	205 lb (93 kg)	–	Jun 8, 2010
Cody Prewitt; S	Recruit ratings: Scout: Rivals: (77)					
Tobias Singleton; WR	Madison, Mississippi	Madison Central High School	6 ft 0 in (1.83 m)	185 lb (84 kg)	4.38	Jan 8, 2011
Tobias Singleton; WR	Recruit ratings: Scout: Rivals: (80)					
Zack Stoudt; QB	Council Bluffs, Iowa	Iowa Western Community College	6 ft 5 in (1.96 m)	234 lb (106 kg)	4.80	Dec 13, 2010
Zack Stoudt; QB	Recruit ratings: Scout: Rivals: (–)					
Kameron Wood; DE	Birmingham, Alabama	John Carroll Catholic High School	6 ft 4 in (1.93 m)	225 lb (102 kg)	4.60	Aug 13, 2010
Kameron Wood; DE	Recruit ratings: Scout: Rivals: (77)					
T.J. Worthy; WR	Gadsden, Alabama	Gadsden City High School	6 ft 2 in (1.88 m)	180 lb (82 kg)	4.60	Aug 13, 2010
T.J. Worthy; WR	Recruit ratings: Scout: Rivals: (74)					
Overall recruit ranking: Scout: 24 Rivals: 18 ESPN: 25
‡ Refers to 40-yard dash; Note: In many cases, Scout, Rivals, 247Sports, On3, and ESPN may conflict in their listings of height, weight and 40 time.; In these cases, the average was taken. ESPN grades are on a 100-point scale.; Sources: "Scout.com Football Recruiting: Mississippi". Scout.; "2011 Player Signees- Mississippi". ESPN.; "Scout.com Team Recruiting Rankings". Scout.; "2011 Team Ranking". Rivals.com.

== Schedule ==
Date	Time	Opponent	Site	TV	Result	Attendance
September 3	3:45 pm	BYU*	Vaught–Hemingway Stadium; Oxford, MS	ESPN	L 13–14	55,124
September 10	5:00 pm	No. 17 (FCS) Southern Illinois*	Vaught–Hemingway Stadium; Oxford, MS	PPV	W 42–24 (vacated)	58,504
September 17	11:21 am	at Vanderbilt	Vanderbilt Stadium; Nashville, TN (rivalry)	SECN	L 7–30	34,579
September 24	11:21 am	Georgia	Vaught–Hemingway Stadium; Oxford, MS	SECN	L 13–27	58,042
October 1	8:15 pm	at Fresno State*	Bulldog Stadium; Fresno, CA	ESPN2	W 38–28 (vacated)	32,063
October 15	5:00 pm	No. 2 Alabama	Vaught–Hemingway Stadium; Oxford, MS (rivalry)	ESPN2	L 7–52	61,792
October 22	11:21 am	No. 10 Arkansas	Vaught–Hemingway Stadium; Oxford, MS (rivalry)	SECN	L 24–29	57,951
October 29	6:00 pm	at Auburn	Jordan–Hare Stadium; Auburn, AL (rivalry)	ESPNU	L 23–41	85,347
November 5	2:30 pm	at Kentucky	Commonwealth Stadium; Lexington, KY	ESPNU	L 13–30	56,882
November 12	6:30 pm	Louisiana Tech*^{†}	Vaught–Hemingway Stadium; Oxford, MS	CSS	L 7–27	44,123
November 19	6:00 pm	No. 1 LSU	Vaught–Hemingway Stadium; Oxford, MS (Magnolia Bowl)	ESPN	L 3–52	59,877
November 26	6:00 pm	at Mississippi State	Davis Wade Stadium; Starkville, MS (Egg Bowl)	ESPNU	L 3–31	55,270
*Non-conference game; ^{†}Homecoming; Rankings from AP P Poll released prior to the game; All times are in Central time

== Game summaries ==
=== Fresno State ===
Team	1	2	3	4	Total
• Ole Miss	13	7	7	11	38
Fresno State	14	0	14	0	28

- Date: October 1
- Location: Bulldog Stadium, Fresno, CA
- Game start: 9:15 p.m. EST

Scoring summary
1	8:08	FRES	Rashad Evans 2-yard pass from Derek Carr (Kevin Goessling kick)	FRES 7–0
1	6:52	MISS	Brandon Bolden 21-yard run (Byron Rose kick)	Tied 7–7
1	2:08	MISS	Melvin Harris 22-yard pass from Randall Mackey (kick blocked)	MISS 13–7
1	0:14	FRES	Jalen Saunders 26-yard run (Kevin Goessling kick)	FRES 14–13
2	9:50	MISS	Brandon Bolden 12-yard run (Byron Rose kick)	MISS 20–14
3	13:01	FRES	Robbie Rouse 7-yard run (Kevin Goessling kick)	FRES 21–20
3	11:15	MISS	Jeff Scott 69-yard run (Byron Rose kick)	MISS 27–21
3	6:15	FRES	Derek Carr 1-yard run (Kevin Goessling kick)	FRES 28–27
4	8:49	MISS	Jeff Scott 12-yard run (Randall Mackey to Donte Moncrief pass)	MISS 35–28
4	3:42	MISS	Byron Rose 24-yard field goal	MISS 38–28
