= 2011 SEC Championship Game =

- Conference Championship
- 2011 SEC Championship logo
Georgia Bulldogs	LSU Tigers
(10–2)	(12–0)
10	42
Head coach: Mark Richt	Head coach: Les Miles
AP / Coaches / BCS; 16 / 17 / 16	AP / Coaches / BCS; 1 / 1 / 1
	1	2	3	4	Total
Georgia	10	0	0	0	10
LSU	0	7	21	14	42
- Date: December 3, 2011
- Season: 2011
- Stadium: Georgia Dome
- Location: Atlanta, Georgia
- MVP: CB Tyrann Mathieu, LSU
- Favorite: LSU by 12½
- Referee: Matt Austin
- Halftime show: Dr.Pepper $100,000 Tuition Throw

United States TV coverage
- Network: CBS
- Announcers: Verne Lundquist (play-by-play); Gary Danielson (color); Tracy Wolfson (sideline)

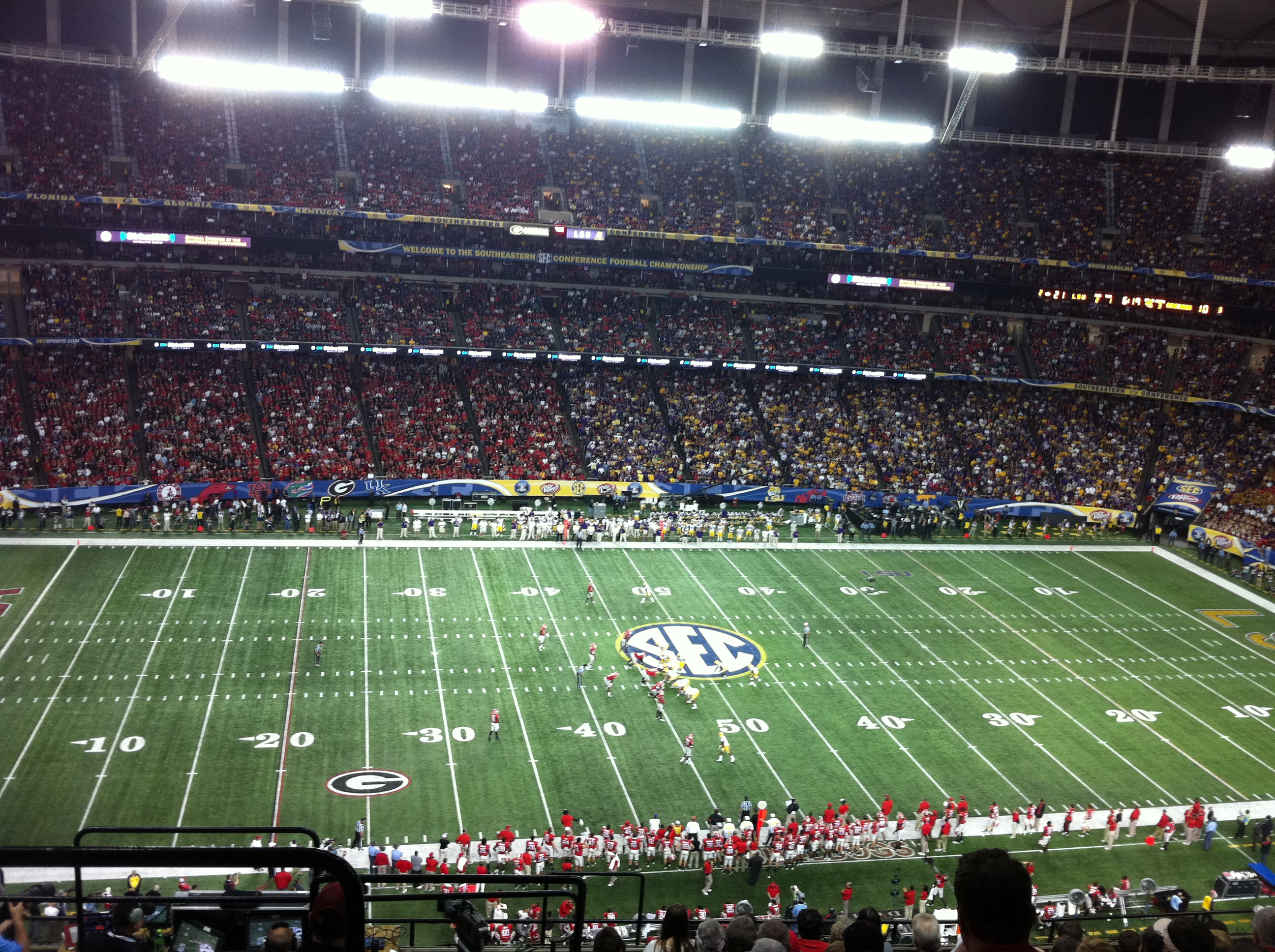

2011 Southeastern Conference football standings
	Conf.			Overall
Team	W		L	W		L
Eastern Division
No. 19 Georgia x	7	–	1	10	–	4
No. 9 South Carolina	6	–	2	11	–	2
Florida	3	–	5	7	–	6
Vanderbilt	2	–	6	6	–	7
Kentucky	2	–	6	5	–	7
Tennessee	1	–	7	5	–	7
Western Division
No. 2 LSU x$	8	–	0	13	–	1
No. 1 Alabama %#	7	–	1	12	–	1
No. 5 Arkansas	6	–	2	11	–	2
Auburn	4	–	4	8	–	5
Mississippi State	2	–	6	7	–	6
Ole Miss*	0	–	8	2	–	10
Championship: LSU 42, Georgia 10
# – BCS National Champion; $ – BCS representative as conference champion; % – BCS at-large representative; x – Division champion/co-champions; * Ole Miss vacated all wins due to NCAA violations.; Rankings from AP Poll

The 2011 SEC Championship Game was played on December 3, 2011, at the Georgia Dome in Atlanta, and determined the 2011 football champion of the Southeastern Conference (SEC). The game featured the Georgia Bulldogs of the Eastern division against the LSU Tigers of the Western division. LSU (the Western division champion) was the designated "home team". This was Georgia's 4th SEC Championship Game and LSU's 5th, and the 3rd time these two teams met in this game. LSU defeated Georgia in 2003 and Georgia defeated LSU in 2005.

LSU defeated Georgia in the 2011 SEC championship game 42–10. The game's MVP was LSU cornerback Tyrann Mathieu. The game was televised by CBS Sports, for the eleventh straight season.

LSU moved to 4–1 in SEC Championship Games and Georgia to 2–2.
