= 2011 Tennessee Volunteers football team =

American college football season

2011 Tennessee Volunteers football
- Conference: Southeastern Conference
- Eastern Division
- Record: 5–7 (1–7 SEC)
- Head coach: Derek Dooley (2nd season)
- Offensive coordinator: Jim Chaney (3rd season)
- Offensive scheme: Pro-style
- Defensive coordinator: Justin Wilcox (2nd season)
- Base defense: 3–4
- Home stadium: Neyland Stadium

2011 Southeastern Conference football standings
	Conf.			Overall
Team	W		L	W		L
Eastern Division
No. 19 Georgia x	7	–	1	10	–	4
No. 9 South Carolina	6	–	2	11	–	2
Florida	3	–	5	7	–	6
Vanderbilt	2	–	6	6	–	7
Kentucky	2	–	6	5	–	7
Tennessee	1	–	7	5	–	7
Western Division
No. 2 LSU x$	8	–	0	13	–	1
No. 1 Alabama %#	7	–	1	12	–	1
No. 5 Arkansas	6	–	2	11	–	2
Auburn	4	–	4	8	–	5
Mississippi State	2	–	6	7	–	6
Ole Miss*	0	–	8	2	–	10
Championship: LSU 42, Georgia 10
# – BCS National Champion; $ – BCS representative as conference champion; % – BCS at-large representative; x – Division champion/co-champions; * Ole Miss vacated all wins due to NCAA violations.; Rankings from AP Poll

The 2011 Tennessee Volunteers football team represented the University of Tennessee in the 2011 NCAA Division I FBS football season. The team was coached by Derek Dooley, who entered his second season with UT. The Volunteers played their home games at Neyland Stadium in Knoxville, Tennessee, and competed in the Eastern Division of the Southeastern Conference (SEC).

== Recruiting class ==
Tennessee's recruiting class was highlighted by six players from the "ESPN 150": No. 57 DeAnthony Arnett (WR); No. 63 Curt Maggitt (OLB); No. 73 Marcus Jackson (OG); No. 105 Antonio Richardson (OT); No. 118 A.J. Johnson (ILB); and No. 134 Marlin Lane (RB). Tennessee signed the No. 13 recruiting class according to Rivals and the No. 11 recruiting class according to Scout. The football program received 27 letters of intent on National Signing Day, February 2, 2011.

College recruiting (2011)
Name	Hometown	School	Height	Weight	40^{‡}	Commit date
DeAnthony Arnett; WR	Saginaw, MI	Saginaw High School	6 ft 0 in (1.83 m)	170 lb (77 kg)	4.50	Oct 11, 2010
DeAnthony Arnett; WR	Recruit ratings: Scout: Rivals: (81)					
Allan Carson; DT	Oxford, AL	Oxford High School	6 ft 1 in (1.85 m)	170 lb (77 kg)	5.30	Jul 6, 2010
Allan Carson; DT	Recruit ratings: Scout: Rivals: (74)					
Cameron Clear; OT	Memphis, TN	Central High School	6 ft 6 in (1.98 m)	260 lb (120 kg)	4.95	Feb 1, 2011
Cameron Clear; OT	Recruit ratings: Scout: Rivals: (45)					
Justin Coleman; CB	Brunswick, GA	Brunswick High School	5 ft 11 in (1.80 m)	175 lb (79 kg)	4.40	Jul 28, 2010
Justin Coleman; CB	Recruit ratings: Scout: Rivals: (78)					
Maurice Couch; DT	Garden City, KS	Garden City C.C.	6 ft 2 in (1.88 m)	295 lb (134 kg)	5.20	Nov 14, 2010
Maurice Couch; DT	Recruit ratings: Scout: Rivals: (–)					
Mack Crowder; C	Bristol, TN	Tennessee High School	6 ft 4 in (1.93 m)	270 lb (120 kg)	5.10	Jul 30, 2010
Mack Crowder; C	Recruit ratings: Scout: Rivals: (79)					
Vincent Dallas; WR	Ellenwood, GA	Cedar Grove High School	6 ft 0 in (1.83 m)	185 lb (84 kg)	–	Oct 15, 2010
Vincent Dallas; WR	Recruit ratings: Scout: Rivals: (78)					
Brendan Downs; TE	Bristol, TN	Tennessee High School	6 ft 6 in (1.98 m)	225 lb (102 kg)	4.60	Jul 30, 2010
Brendan Downs; TE	Recruit ratings: Scout: Rivals: (78)					
Christian Harris; OLB	Woodstock, GA	Etowah High School	6 ft 1 in (1.85 m)	210 lb (95 kg)	–	Mar 20, 2010
Christian Harris; OLB	Recruit ratings: Scout: Rivals: (78)					
Marcus Jackson; OG	Vero Beach, FL	Vero Beach High School	6 ft 4 in (1.93 m)	310 lb (140 kg)	–	Jan 5, 2011
Marcus Jackson; OG	Recruit ratings: Scout: Rivals: (81)					
A.J. Johnson; MLB	Gainesville, GA	Gainesville High School	6 ft 3 in (1.91 m)	227 lb (103 kg)	4.70	Sep 17, 2010
A.J. Johnson; MLB	Recruit ratings: Scout: Rivals: (81)					
Kyler Kerbyson; OT	Knoxville, TN	Knoxville Catholic High School	6 ft 5 in (1.96 m)	290 lb (130 kg)	–	Aug 12, 2010
Kyler Kerbyson; OT	Recruit ratings: Scout: Rivals: (79)					
Marlin Lane; RB	Daytona Beach, FL	Mainland High School	6 ft 0 in (1.83 m)	205 lb (93 kg)	4.62	Jan 24, 2011
Marlin Lane; RB	Recruit ratings: Scout: Rivals: (80)					
Izauea Lanier; CB	Scooba, MS	East Mississippi C.C.	6 ft 1 in (1.85 m)	190 lb (86 kg)	4.50	Jan 17, 2011
Izauea Lanier; CB	Recruit ratings: Scout: Rivals: (–)					
Curt Maggitt; OLB	Palm Beach Gardens, FL	William T. Dwyer High School	6 ft 3 in (1.91 m)	210 lb (95 kg)	–	Feb 1, 2011
Curt Maggitt; OLB	Recruit ratings: Scout: Rivals: (81)					
Pat Martin; S	Greenville, SC	J.L. Mann High School	6 ft 0 in (1.83 m)	198 lb (90 kg)	4.55	Aug 15, 2010
Pat Martin; S	Recruit ratings: Scout: Rivals: (80)					
Byron Moore; S	Wilmington, CA	Los Angeles Harbor C.C.	6 ft 1 in (1.85 m)	205 lb (93 kg)	4.50	Jan 31, 2011
Byron Moore; S	Recruit ratings: Scout: Rivals: (–)					
Geraldo Orta; S	Valdosta, GA	Lowndes High School	6 ft 0 in (1.83 m)	166 lb (75 kg)	4.83	Jan 22, 2011
Geraldo Orta; S	Recruit ratings: Scout: Rivals: (80)					
Alan Posey; OG	Athens, GA	Clarke Central High School	6 ft 6 in (1.98 m)	305 lb (138 kg)	5.20	May 4, 2010
Alan Posey; OG	Recruit ratings: Scout: Rivals: (79)					
Brian Randolph; S	Marietta, GA	Kell High School	5 ft 11 in (1.80 m)	180 lb (82 kg)	4.49	Jun 15, 2010
Brian Randolph; S	Recruit ratings: Scout: Rivals: (78)					
Antonio Richardson; OT	Nashville, TN	Pearl-Cohn High School	6 ft 6 in (1.98 m)	310 lb (140 kg)	5.20	Feb 2, 2011
Antonio Richardson; OT	Recruit ratings: Scout: Rivals: (81)					
Trevarris Saulsberry; DE	Gainesville, FL	Gainesville High School	6 ft 4 in (1.93 m)	230 lb (100 kg)	–	Aug 2, 2010
Trevarris Saulsberry; DE	Recruit ratings: Scout: Rivals: (77)					
Tom Smith; RB	Apopka, FL	Apopka Senior High School	6 ft 0 in (1.83 m)	195 lb (88 kg)	4.50	Jun 15, 2010
Tom Smith; RB	Recruit ratings: Scout: Rivals: (76)					
Tino Thomas; WR	Memphis, TN	Melrose High School	6 ft 1 in (1.85 m)	194 lb (88 kg)	–	Oct 8, 2010
Tino Thomas; WR	Recruit ratings: Scout: Rivals: (75)					
Jordan Williams; DE	Gainesville, FL	Gainesville High School	6 ft 4 in (1.93 m)	230 lb (100 kg)	–	Oct 13, 2010
Jordan Williams; DE	Recruit ratings: Scout: Rivals: (77)					
Justin Worley; QB	Rock Hill, SC	Northwestern High School	6 ft 4 in (1.93 m)	197 lb (89 kg)	4.80	Jul 2, 2010
Justin Worley; QB	Recruit ratings: Scout: Rivals: (79)					
Devrin Young; RB	Knoxville, TN	Bearden High School	5 ft 9 in (1.75 m)	165 lb (75 kg)	4.50	Sep 29, 2010
Devrin Young; RB	Recruit ratings: Scout: Rivals: (74)					
Overall recruit ranking: Scout: 11 Rivals: 13 ESPN: 13
‡ Refers to 40-yard dash; Note: In many cases, Scout, Rivals, 247Sports, On3, and ESPN may conflict in their listings of height, weight and 40 time.; In these cases, the average was taken. ESPN grades are on a 100-point scale.; Sources: "Scout.com Football Recruiting: Tennessee". Scout.; "2011 Player Signees- Tennessee". ESPN.; "Scout.com Team Recruiting Rankings". Scout.; "2011 Team Ranking". Rivals.com.

== Schedule ==
Date	Time	Opponent	Site	TV	Result	Attendance
September 3	6:00 pm	No. 12 (FCS) Montana*	Neyland Stadium; Knoxville, TN	PPV	W 42–16	94,661
September 10	3:30 pm	Cincinnati*	Neyland Stadium; Knoxville, TN	ESPN2	W 45–23	94,207
September 17	3:30 pm	at No. 17 Florida	Ben Hill Griffin Stadium; Gainesville, FL (Third Saturday in September)	CBS	L 23–33	90,744
October 1	12:30 pm	Buffalo*	Neyland Stadium; Knoxville, TN	CSS	W 41–10	87,758
October 8	7:00 pm	Georgia	Neyland Stadium; Knoxville, TN (rivalry)	ESPN2	L 12–20	102,455
October 15	3:30 pm	No. 1 LSU	Neyland Stadium; Knoxville, TN	CBS	L 7–38	101,822
October 22	7:15 pm	at No. 2 Alabama	Bryant–Denny Stadium; Tuscaloosa, AL (Third Saturday in October)	ESPN2	L 6–37	101,821
October 29	7:00 pm	No. 9 South Carolina	Neyland Stadium; Knoxville, TN (rivalry)	ESPN2	L 3–14	96,655
November 5	7:00 pm	Middle Tennessee*^{†}	Neyland Stadium; Knoxville, TN	SECRN	W 24–0	88,211
November 12	6:00 pm	at No. 8 Arkansas	Donald W. Reynolds Razorback Stadium; Fayetteville, AR	ESPN2	L 7–49	72,103
November 19	7:00 pm	Vanderbilt	Neyland Stadium; Knoxville, TN (rivalry)	ESPNU	W 27–21 ^{OT}	91,867
November 26	12:21 pm	at Kentucky	Commonwealth Stadium; Lexington, KY (rivalry)	SECN	L 7–10	57,040
*Non-conference game; ^{†}Homecoming; Rankings from AP Poll released prior to the game; All times are in Eastern time

Schedule source:

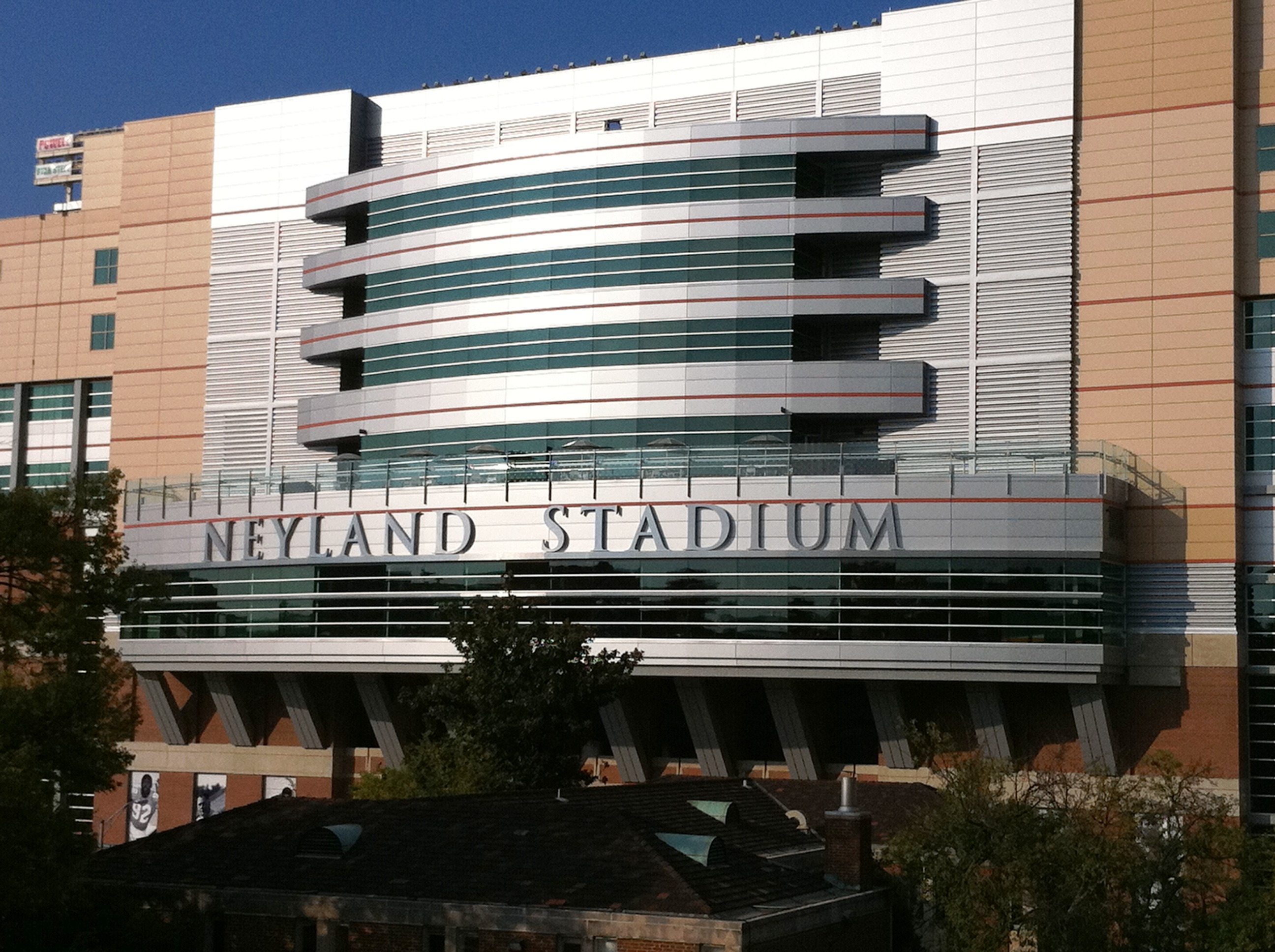
Neyland Stadium hosted eight Tennessee home games in 2011.

== Personnel ==
=== Coaching staff ===
Name	Position	Seasons at Tennessee	Alma Mater
Derek Dooley	Head coach	2	Virginia (1991)
Charlie Baggett	Assistant Head Coach, Wide Receivers	2	Michigan State (1975)
Jim Chaney	Offensive coordinator, Offensive Line	3	Central Missouri State (1983)
Harry Hiestand	Offensive Line	2	East Stroudsburg (1983)
Darin Hinshaw	Quarterbacks	2	UCF (1993)
Terry Joseph	Defensive Backs, Recruiting Coordinator	2	Northwestern State (1996)
Eric Russell	Tight Ends, Special Teams	2	Idaho (1991)
Peter Sirmon	Linebackers	1	Oregon (1999)
Lance Thompson	Defensive Line	3	The Citadel (1987)
Justin Wilcox	Defensive coordinator	2	Oregon (1999)

The Middle Tennessee homecoming game is notable for having Derrick Brodus, a redshirt freshman walk-on who was not on the depth chart and never played college football, plucked from his fraternity's couch after Tennessee's other kickers (regular Michael Palardy was out and his replacement Chip Rhome hurt himself during warm-ups) were unavailable. He got the call less than an hour before kickoff. Brodus scored three extra points and a field goal in the victory.

== Team players drafted into the NFL ==
Player	Position	Round	Pick	NFL club
Malik Jackson	Defensive end	5	137	Denver Broncos
