= 2011 LSU Tigers football team =

American college football season

2011 LSU Tigers football

National champion (Anderson & Hester) SEC champion SEC Western Division champion

SEC Championship Game, W 42–10 vs. Georgia

BCS National Championship Game, L 0–21 vs. Alabama
- Conference: Southeastern Conference
- Western Division

Ranking
- Coaches: No. 2
- AP: No. 2
- Record: 13–1 (8–0 SEC)
- Head coach: Les Miles (7th season)
- Offensive coordinator: Greg Studrawa (1st season)
- Offensive scheme: Multiple
- Defensive coordinator: John Chavis (3rd season)
- Base defense: 4–3
- MVP: Tyrann Mathieu
- Captains: Will Blackwell; Morris Claiborne; Jordan Jefferson; Brandon Taylor
- Home stadium: Tiger Stadium

2011 Southeastern Conference football standings
	Conf.			Overall
Team	W		L	W		L
Eastern Division
No. 19 Georgia x	7	–	1	10	–	4
No. 9 South Carolina	6	–	2	11	–	2
Florida	3	–	5	7	–	6
Vanderbilt	2	–	6	6	–	7
Kentucky	2	–	6	5	–	7
Tennessee	1	–	7	5	–	7
Western Division
No. 2 LSU x$	8	–	0	13	–	1
No. 1 Alabama %#	7	–	1	12	–	1
No. 5 Arkansas	6	–	2	11	–	2
Auburn	4	–	4	8	–	5
Mississippi State	2	–	6	7	–	6
Ole Miss*	0	–	8	2	–	10
Championship: LSU 42, Georgia 10
# – BCS National Champion; $ – BCS representative as conference champion; % – BCS at-large representative; x – Division champion/co-champions; * Ole Miss vacated all wins due to NCAA violations.; Rankings from AP Poll

The 2011 LSU Tigers football team represented Louisiana State University in the 2011 NCAA Division I FBS football season. The Tigers were led by seventh-year head coach Les Miles and played their home games at Tiger Stadium. They were a member of the Western Division of the Southeastern Conference. They finished the season 13–1, 8–0 in SEC play to be Western Division champions. They represented the division in the SEC Championship Game where they defeated Eastern Division champion Georgia 42–10 to be crowned SEC champions. They finished the season ranked #1 in the final BCS poll to earn a spot in the BCS National Championship Game vs #2 Alabama. The Tigers, who had defeated Alabama 9–6 in the regular season, lost to the Crimson Tide 21–0. It was the first and only time a team was shut out in a BCS game.

== Personnel ==
=== Roster ===
2011 LSU Tigers football team roster
Players
Coaches
Offense

Pos.	#	Name	Class
RB	4	Alfred Blue	So
WR	33	Odell Beckham Jr.	Fr
WR	80	Jarvis Landry	Fr
QB	8	Zach Mettenberger	So
TE	81	Jake Franklin	So

Defense

Pos.	#	Name	Class
CB	7	Tyrann Mathieu	So
CB	17	Morris Claiborne	Jr
DT	90	Michael Brockers	So
DT	97	Dennis Johnson	Sr
DE	49	Barkevious Mingo	So

Special teams

Pos.	#	Name	Class
LS	50	Joey Crappell	Sr
P	38	Brad Wing	RFr

Head coach

- Les Miles

Coordinators/assistant coaches

Legend

- (C) Team captain
- (S) Suspended
- (I) Ineligible
- Injured
- Redshirt

Roster

=== Coaching staff ===
Name	Position	Seasons at LSU	Alma mater
Les Miles	Head Coach	7	Michigan (1976)
John Chavis	Defensive coordinator	3	Tennessee (1979)
Greg Studrawa	Offensive coordinator	5	Bowling Green (1987)
Steve Kragthorpe	Quarterbacks	1	West Texas State (1988)
Frank Wilson	Running backs, Recruiting Coordinator	2	Nicholls State (1997)
Ron Cooper	Defensive backs	3	Jacksonville State (1983)
Steve Ensminger	Tight ends	2	LSU (1982)
Billy Gonzales	Wide Receivers, Passing Game Coordinator	2	Colorado State (1994)
Brick Haley	Defensive Line	3	Alabama A&M (1989)
Thomas McGaughey	Special teams	1	Houston (1995)

== Depth chart ==
Defense

FS
Eric Reid
Craig Loston
Sam Gibson

WLB	MLB	SLB
⋅	Kevin Minter	⋅
Lamin Barrow	Karnell Hatcher	⋅
Luke Muncie	DJ Welter	⋅

SS
Brandon Taylor
Derrick Bryant
Robert Smith III

CB
Morris Claiborne
Ron Brooks
David Jenkins

DE	DT	DT	DE
Ken Adams	Bennie Logan	Michael Brockers	Sam Montgomery
Barkevious Mingo	Josh Downs	Anthony Johnson	Lavar Edwards
Jermauria Rasco	Ego Ferguson	Dennis Johnson	Chancey Aghayere

CB
Tyrann Mathieu
Tharold Simon
Jeff Lang

Offense

WR
Rueben Randle
James Wright
Jarvis Landry

WR
Russell Shepard
Jarvis Landry
Jarrett Fobbs

LT	LG	C	RG	RT
Chris Faulk	T-Bob Hebert	P.J. Lonergan	Will Blackwell	Alex Hurst
Greg Shaw	La'el Collins	T-Bob Hebert	Josh Williford	Greg Shaw
La'el Collins	Matt Branch	Will Blackwell	⋅	⋅

TE
DeAngelo Peterson
Chase Clement
Mitch Joseph

WR
Odell Beckham Jr.
Kadron Boone
Jarvis Landry

QB
Jarrett Lee
Jordan Jefferson
Zach Mettenberger

RB
Spencer Ware
Michael Ford
Alfred Blue

Special teams
PK Drew Alleman
PK James Hairston
P Brad Wing
P DJ Howard
KR Morris Claiborne
PR Tyrann Mathieu
LS Austin Kinchen
H Brad Wing

== Schedule ==
Date	Time	Opponent	Rank	Site	TV	Result	Attendance	Source
September 3	7:00 p.m.	vs. No. 3 Oregon*	No. 4	Cowboys Stadium; Arlington, TX (Cowboys Classic, College GameDay)	ABC	W 40–27	87,711	
September 10	7:00 p.m.	Northwestern State*	No. 2	Tiger Stadium; Baton Rouge, LA	PPV	W 49–3	92,405	
September 15	7:00 p.m.	at No. 25 Mississippi State	No. 3	Davis Wade Stadium; Starkville, MS (rivalry)	ESPN	W 19–6	56,924	
September 24	7:00 p.m.	at No. 16 West Virginia*	No. 2	Mountaineer Field; Morgantown, WV (College GameDay)	ABC	W 47–21	62,056	
October 1	11:21 a.m.	Kentucky	No. 1	Tiger Stadium; Baton Rouge, LA	SECN	W 35–7	92,660	
October 8	2:30 p.m.	No. 17 Florida	No. 1	Tiger Stadium; Baton Rouge, LA (rivalry)	CBS	W 41–11	93,022	
October 15	2:30 p.m.	at Tennessee	No. 1	Neyland Stadium; Knoxville, TN	CBS	W 38–7	101,822	
October 22	2:30 p.m.	No. 19 Auburn	No. 1	Tiger Stadium; Baton Rouge, LA (rivalry)	CBS	W 45–10	93,098	
November 5	7:00 p.m.	at No. 2 Alabama	No. 1	Bryant–Denny Stadium; Tuscaloosa, AL (rivalry, College GameDay)	CBS	W 9–6 ^{OT}	101,823	
November 12	6:00 p.m.	Western Kentucky*^{†}	No. 1	Tiger Stadium; Baton Rouge, LA	ESPNU	W 42–9	92,917	
November 19	6:00 p.m.	at Ole Miss	No. 1	Vaught–Hemingway Stadium; Oxford, MS (Magnolia Bowl)	ESPN	W 52–3	59,877	
November 25	1:30 p.m.	No. 3 Arkansas	No. 1	Tiger Stadium; Baton Rouge, LA (rivalry)	CBS	W 41–17	93,108	
December 3	3:00 p.m.	vs. No. 12 Georgia	No. 1	Georgia Dome; Atlanta, GA (SEC Championship Game, College GameDay)	CBS	W 42–10	74,515	
January 9, 2012	7:30 p.m.	vs. No. 2 Alabama	No. 1	Mercedes-Benz Superdome; New Orleans, LA (BCS National Championship Game, College GameDay)	ESPN	L 0–21	78,237	
*Non-conference game; ^{†}Homecoming; Rankings from AP Poll released prior to the game; All times are in Central time

== Game summaries ==
=== Oregon ===
This is only the 4th meeting of these two teams. The win expanded LSU's lead in the series to 3–1–0.

	1	2	3	4	Total
#3 Ducks	6	7	0	14	27
#4 Tigers	3	13	14	10	40

Scoring summary

Quarter	Time	Drive			Team	Scoring information	Score	
Quarter	Time	Plays	Yards	TOP	Team	Scoring information	Oregon	LSU
1	11:14	6	12	2:35	LSU	44-yard field goal by Drew Alleman	0	3
1	3:55	12	39	4:14	Oregon	29-yard field goal by Rob Beard	3	3
1	0:42	4	7	0:30	Oregon	30-yard field goal by Rob Beard	6	3
2	14:43				LSU	Fumble recovery returned 3 yards for touchdown by Tyrann Mathieu, Drew Alleman kick no good	6	9
2	5:16	19	79	7:41	Oregon	LaMichael James 3-yard touchdown run, Rob Beard kick good	13	9
2	0:44	12	75	4:26	LSU	Rueben Randle 10-yard touchdown reception from Jarrett Lee, Drew Alleman kick good	13	16
3	6:23	5	24	1:55	LSU	Michael Ford 5-yard touchdown run, Drew Alleman kick good	13	23
3	3:03	6	41	3:12	LSU	Spencer Ware 1-yard touchdown run, Drew Alleman kick good	13	30
4	14:07	8	33	3:25	LSU	32-yard field goal by Drew Alleman	13	33
4	9:14	13	68	4:47	Oregon	Josh Huff 8-yard touchdown reception from Darron Thomas, Rob Beard kick good	20	33
4	2:52	5	41	2:56	LSU	Michael Ford 16-yard touchdown run, Drew Alleman kick good	20	40
4	0:13	11	70	2:33	Oregon	Darron Thomas 4-yard touchdown run, Rob Beard kick good	27	40
"TOP" = time of possession. For other American football terms, see Glossary of American football.							27	40

=== Northwestern State ===
The "series" began in 1911. The win expanded LSU's lead in the series to 11–0–0.

	1	2	3	4	Total
Demons	0	3	0	0	3
#2 Tigers	7	21	14	7	49

Scoring summary

Quarter	Time	Drive			Team	Scoring information	Score	
Quarter	Time	Plays	Yards	TOP	Team	Scoring information	Northwestern State	LSU
1	8:03	6	67	2:54	LSU	Deangelo Peterson 9-yard touchdown reception from Jarrett Lee, Drew Alleman kick good	0	7
2	14:00	6	12	2:25	Northwestern State	44-yard field goal by John Shaughnessy	3	7
2	9:50	8	63	4:06	LSU	Spencer Ware 1-yard touchdown run, Drew Alleman kick good	3	14
2	8:33	2	15	0:30	LSU	Spencer Ware 6-yard touchdown run, Drew Alleman kick good	3	21
2	0:20	5	52	0:30	LSU	Michael Ford 3-yard touchdown run, Drew Alleman kick good	3	28
3	12:39	6	59	2:18	LSU	Michael Ford 7-yard touchdown run, Drew Alleman kick good	3	35
3	2:36	10	57	3:57	LSU	Alfred Blue 4-yard touchdown run, Drew Alleman kick good	3	42
4	7:36	15	68	8:13	LSU	Kadron Boone 19-yard touchdown reception from Zach Mettenberger, Drew Alleman kick good	3	49
"TOP" = time of possession. For other American football terms, see Glossary of American football.							3	49

=== Mississippi State ===
The series began in 1896 and LSU has played the Bulldogs more often than any other opponent. The win expanded LSU's lead in the series to 69–33–3.

	1	2	3	4	Total
#3 Tigers	3	3	3	10	19
#25 Bulldogs	3	0	3	0	6

Scoring summary

Quarter	Time	Drive			Team	Scoring information	Score	
Quarter	Time	Plays	Yards	TOP	Team	Scoring information	LSU	Mississippi State
1	5:42	16	77	7:28	LSU	21-yard field goal by Drew Alleman	3	0
1	0:04	14	57	5:33	Mississippi State	26-yard field goal by Derek DePasquale	3	3
2	1:18	10	70	4:35	LSU	42-yard field goal by Drew Alleman	6	3
3	5:26	7	25	2:54	Mississippi State	42-yard field goal by Derek DePasquale	6	6
3	1:46	9	49	5:20	LSU	41-yard field goal by Drew Alleman	9	6
4	11:56	7	80	3:04	LSU	Rueben Randle 19-yard touchdown reception from Jarrett Lee, Drew Alleman kick good	16	6
4	2:53	4	7	2:09	LSU	29-yard field goal by Drew Alleman	19	6
"TOP" = time of possession. For other American football terms, see Glossary of American football.							19	6

=== West Virginia ===
	1	2	3	4	Total
#2 Tigers	13	14	7	13	47
#16 Mountaineers	0	7	14	0	21

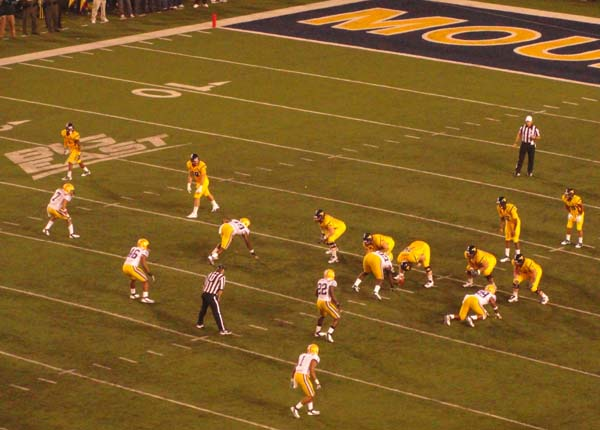
West Virginia on offense in the first half.

Scoring summary

Quarter	Time	Drive			Team	Scoring information	Score	
Quarter	Time	Plays	Yards	TOP	Team	Scoring information	LSU	West Virginia
1	10:05	8	58	3:22	LSU	Rueben Randle 11-yard touchdown reception from Jarrett Lee, Drew Alleman kick good	7	0
1	1:49	7	50	2:42	LSU	Michael Ford 22-yard touchdown run, 2-point run failed	13	0
2	12:30	12	73	4:14	West Virginia	Stedman Bailey 20-yard touchdown reception from Geno Smith, Tyler Bitancurt kick good	13	7
2	6:57	3	61	1:29	LSU	Odell Beckham 52-yard touchdown reception from Jarrett Lee, Drew Alleman kick good	20	7
2	0:27	2	1	0:11	LSU	Chase Clement 1-yard touchdown reception from Jarrett Lee, Drew Alleman kick good	27	7
3	8:40	6	80	2:13	West Virginia	Tyler Urban 12-yard touchdown reception from Geno Smith, Tyler Bitancurt kick good	27	14
3	1:16	5	90	1:23	West Virginia	Dustin Garrison 1-yard touchdown run, Tyler Bitancurt kick good	27	21
3	1:00				LSU	Kickoff returned 99 yards for touchdown by Morris Claiborne, 2-point pass failed	34	21
4	9:55	9	57	4:17	LSU	Michael Ford 15-yard touchdown run, 2-point pass failed	40	21
4	3:03	8	55	4:56	LSU	Alfred Blue 18-yard touchdown run, Drew Alleman kick good	47	21
"TOP" = time of possession. For other American football terms, see Glossary of American football.							47	21

=== Kentucky ===
The series began in 1949. The win expanded LSU's lead in the series to 39–16–1.

	1	2	3	4	Total
Wildcats	0	0	0	7	7
#1 Tigers	7	7	14	7	35

Scoring summary

Quarter	Time	Drive			Team	Scoring information	Score	
Quarter	Time	Plays	Yards	TOP	Team	Scoring information	LSU	Kentucky
1	7:06	12	68	5:37	LSU	Jordan Jefferson 1-yard touchdown run, Drew Alleman kick good	7	0
2	11:14	4	64	0:43	LSU	Odell Beckham 51-yard touchdown reception from Jarrett Lee, Drew Alleman kick good	14	0
3	8:07	10	68	5:12	LSU	Alfred Blue 1-yard touchdown run, Drew Alleman kick good	21	0
3	4:30				LSU	Fumble recovery returned 23 yards for touchdown by Tyrann Mathieu, Drew Alleman kick good	28	0
4	10:39	6	47	2:16	LSU	Terrence Magee 1-yard touchdown run, Drew Alleman kick good	35	0
4	4:22	12	70	6:09	Kentucky	Matt Roark 4-yard touchdown reception from Morgan Newton, Craig McIntosh kick good	35	7
"TOP" = time of possession. For other American football terms, see Glossary of American football.							35	7

=== Florida ===
The series began in 1937. LSU currently trails in the series, but with the win makes it 25–30–3.

	1	2	3	4	Total
#17 Gators	0	3	8	0	11
#1 Tigers	14	10	3	14	41

Scoring summary

Quarter	Time	Drive			Team	Scoring information	Score	
Quarter	Time	Plays	Yards	TOP	Team	Scoring information	Florida	LSU
1	11:55	2	50	0:44	LSU	Rueben Randle 46-yard touchdown reception from Jarrett Lee, Drew Alleman kick good	0	7
1	6:40	8	57	3:26	LSU	Spencer Ware 2-yard touchdown run, Drew Alleman kick good	0	14
2	13:22	8	29	3:48	LSU	35-yard field goal by Drew Alleman	0	17
2	6:50	2	45	0:43	LSU	Spencer Ware 8-yard touchdown run, Drew Alleman kick good	0	24
2	0:08	14	59	6:42	Florida	34-yard field goal by Caleb Sturgis	3	24
3	4:40	10	51	5:06	LSU	23-yard field goal by Drew Alleman	3	27
3	0:40	1	65	0:09	Florida	Andre Debose 65-yard touchdown reception from Jacoby Brissett, 2-point run good	11	27
4	12:20	6	81	3:16	LSU	Mitch Joseph 2-yard touchdown reception from Jordan Jefferson, Drew Alleman kick good	11	34
4	1:27	11	76	6:39	LSU	Alfred Blue 2-yard touchdown run, Drew Alleman kick good	11	41
"TOP" = time of possession. For other American football terms, see Glossary of American football.							11	41

=== Tennessee ===
The series began in 1925. LSU currently trails in the series, but with the win makes it 9–20–3. This was also the largest margin of victory by either team in the series.

	1	2	3	4	Total
#1 Tigers	0	17	7	14	38
Volunteers	0	7	0	0	7

Scoring summary

Quarter	Time	Drive			Team	Scoring information	Score	
Quarter	Time	Plays	Yards	TOP	Team	Scoring information	LSU	Tennessee
2	14:56	2	5	0:13	LSU	Rueben Randle 5-yard touchdown reception from Jarrett Lee, Drew Alleman kick good	7	0
2	10:01	7	36	4:06	LSU	Spencer Ware 13-yard touchdown reception from Jarrett Lee, Drew Alleman kick good	14	0
2	2:24	10	80	4:30	Tennessee	Tauren Poole 2-yard touchdown run, Michael Parlady kick good	14	7
2	0:15	6	65	2:01	LSU	18-yard field goal by Drew Alleman	17	7
3	7:53	12	66	7:01	LSU	Spencer Ware 1-yard touchdown run, Drew Alleman kick good	24	7
4	8:55	16	99	8:44	LSU	Jordan Jefferson 3-yard touchdown run, Drew Alleman kick good	31	7
4	1:35	10	65	6:08	LSU	Russell Shepard 14-yard touchdown reception from Jarrett Lee, Drew Alleman kick good	38	7
"TOP" = time of possession. For other American football terms, see Glossary of American football.							38	7

=== Auburn ===
The series began in 1901. The win expanded LSU's lead in the series to 25–20–1. This was also the largest margin of victory by either team in the series.

	1	2	3	4	Total
#19 Auburn Tigers	3	0	0	7	10
#1 LSU Tigers	7	14	21	3	45

Scoring summary

Quarter	Time	Drive			Team	Scoring information	Score	
Quarter	Time	Plays	Yards	TOP	Team	Scoring information	Auburn	LSU
1	11:13	8	76	3:47	LSU	Kenny Hilliard 9-yard touchdown run, Drew Alleman kick good	0	7
1	1:26	9	41	3:35	Auburn	42-yard field goal by Cody Parkey	3	7
2	5:00	3	60	1:57	LSU	Rueben Randle 42-yard touchdown reception from Jordan Jefferson, Drew Alleman kick good	3	14
2	0:40	8	86	2:26	LSU	Rueben Randle 46-yard touchdown reception from Jarrett Lee, Drew Alleman kick good	3	21
3	9:51	6	74	3:19	LSU	Russell Shepard 10-yard touchdown reception from Jarrett Lee, Drew Alleman kick good	3	28
3	8:12	4	22	1:30	LSU	Kenny Hilliard 1-yard touchdown run, Drew Alleman kick good	3	35
3	7:27				LSU	Interception returned 28 yards for touchdown by Ron Brooks, Drew Alleman kick good	3	42
4	13:56	11	50	4:57	LSU	36-yard field goal by Drew Alleman	3	45
4	2:22	10	86	5:11	Auburn	Onterio McCalebb 2-yard touchdown run, Cody Parkey kick good	10	45
"TOP" = time of possession. For other American football terms, see Glossary of American football.							10	45

=== Alabama ===
The series began in 1895. LSU still trails in the series, but with the win makes it 25–45–5.

	1	2	3	4	OT	Total
#1 Tigers	0	3	0	3	3	9
#2 Crimson Tide	0	3	3	0	0	6

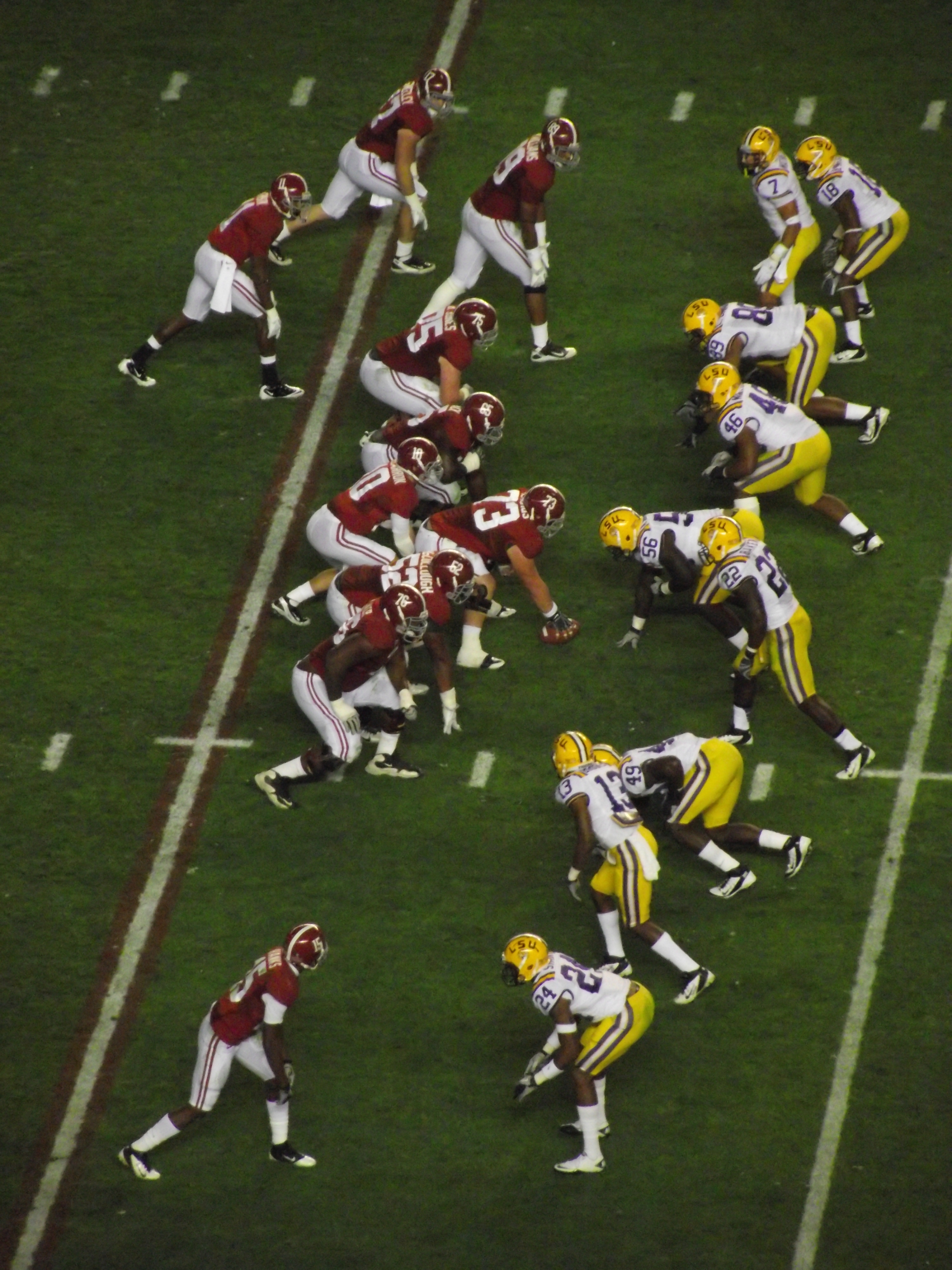
The Alabama offense lines up against the LSU defense.

=== Western Kentucky ===
This was the first meeting between the two teams. At halftime, soccer player Mo Isom was named Homecoming Queen at halftime in Tiger Stadium. Isom was the first athlete in LSU history to be recognized as Homecoming Queen.

	1	2	3	4	Total
Hilltoppers	7	0	2	0	9
#1 Tigers	7	7	14	14	42

=== Ole Miss ===
The series began in 1894. In this, the 100th meeting between the two teams, the win extended LSU's lead in the series to 57–39–4. This was also the largest margin of victory by either team in the series and Mississippi's worst loss at home ever – after a 47–0 loss to Kentucky in 1949.

#1 LSU at Ole Miss

Team	1	2	3	4	Total
• LSU	21	14	14	3	52
Ole Miss	0	3	0	0	3

- Date: November 19
- Location: Vaught–Hemingway Stadium, Oxford, MS
- Game start: 7:00 p.m. EST
- Television network: ESPN

Scoring summary
1	14:32	LSU	Ron Brooks 46-yard interception return (Drew Alleman kick)	LSU 7–0
1	6:45	LSU	Kenny Hillard 1-yard run (Drew Alleman kick)	LSU 14–0
1	5:11	LSU	Russell Shepard 22-yard pass from Jordan Jefferson (Drew Alleman kick)	LSU 21–0
2	12:42	LSU	Kevin Minter 0-yard fumble return (Drew Alleman kick)	LSU 28–0
2	3:01	LSU	Spencer Ware 35-yard run (Drew Alleman kick)	LSU 35–0
2	1:03	MISS	Byron Rose 39-yard field goal	LSU 35–3
3	12:35	LSU	Michael Ford 19-yard run (Drew Alleman kick)	LSU 42–3
3	0:54	LSU	James Stampley 1-yard run (Drew Alleman kick)	LSU 49–3
4	9:30	LSU	Drew Alleman 29-yard field goal	LSU 52–3

=== Arkansas ===
#3 Arkansas at #1 LSU

Team	1	2	3	4	Total
Arkansas	0	14	3	0	17
• LSU	0	21	3	17	41

- Date: November 25
- Location: Tiger Stadium, Baton Rouge, LA
- Game start: 2:30 p.m. EST
- TV announcers (CBS): Verne Lundquist & Gary Danielson

Scoring summary
2	14:54	ARK	Jarius Wright 13-yard pass from Tyler Wilson (Zach Hocker kick)	ARK 7–0
2	12:11	ARK	Alonzo Highsmith 47-yard fumble return (Zach Hocker kick)	ARK 14–0
2	5:15	LSU	Kenny Hillard 6-yard run (Drew Alleman kick)	ARK 14–7
2	3:24	LSU	Tyrann Mathieu 92-yard punt return (Drew Alleman kick)	Tied 14–14
2	0:59	LSU	Russell Shepard 9-yard pass from Jordan Jefferson (Drew Alleman kick)	LSU 21–14
3	7:42	ARK	Zach Hocker 29-yard field goal	LSU 21–17
3	2:14	LSU	Drew Alleman 21-yard field goal	LSU 24–17
4	11:04	LSU	Spencer Ware 7-yard run (Drew Alleman kick)	LSU 31–17
4	10:09	LSU	Jordan Jefferson 48-yard run (Drew Alleman kick)	LSU 38–17
4	5:08	LSU	Drew Alleman 37-yard field goal	LSU 41–17

The series began in 1901. With the win, LSU extends their lead in the series to 35–20–2 as well as winning the SEC West Division and thus their spot in the conference championship game against Georgia. This was the 2nd largest audience in Tiger Stadium history, behind the 2009 game against Florida which featured 93,129 fans.

=== Georgia (SEC Championship Game) ===
This series began in 1901. The last time these two teams played, #13 Georgia won over #3 LSU in 2005 34–15. #8 Georgia went on to lose the Sugar Bowl to #13 West Virginia 35–38. With the win in this game, LSU extended their lead in the series to 16–12–1 as well as winning the SEC and thus their spot in the national championship game against Alabama.

	1	2	3	4	Total
#12 Bulldogs	10	0	0	0	10
#1 Tigers	0	7	21	14	42

=== Alabama (National Championship Game) ===
For the first time in the BCS-era, the two teams in the national championship game are from the same conference and division.

	1	2	3	4	Total
#2 Crimson Tide	3	6	6	6	21
#1 Tigers	0	0	0	0	0

== Rankings ==
Ranking movements Legend: ██ Increase in ranking ██ Decrease in ranking т = Tied with team above or below ( ) = First-place votes
	Week															
Poll	Pre	1	2	3	4	5	6	7	8	9	10	11	12	13	14	Final
AP	4 (1)	2 (17)	3 (17)	2 (14)	1 (42)	1 (40)	1 (40)	1 (41)	1 (49)	1 (47)	1 (59)	1 (60)	1 (60)	1 (60)	1 (60)	2 (1)
Coaches	4 (2)	3 (7)	3 (7)	3 (5)	2т (20)	2 (21)	2 (15)	2 (15)	1 (41)	1 (41)	1 (59)	1 (59)	1 (60)	1 (59)	1 (59)	2
Harris	Not released						1 (71)	1 (74)	1 (94)	1 (93)	1 (112)	1 (115)	1 (115)	1 (115)	1 (115)	Not released
BCS	Not released							1	1	1	1	1	1	1	1	Not released
