= 2011 Vanderbilt Commodores football team =

American college football season

2011 Vanderbilt Commodores football

Liberty Bowl, L 24–31 vs. Cincinnati
- Conference: Southeastern Conference
- Eastern Division
- Record: 6–7 (2–6 SEC)
- Head coach: James Franklin (1st season)
- Offensive coordinator: John Donovan (1st season)
- Offensive scheme: Multiple
- Defensive coordinator: Bob Shoop (1st season)
- Co-defensive coordinator: Brent Pry (1st season)
- Base defense: 4–3
- Captain: 5: Kyle Fischer; Casey Hayward; Chris Marve; Larry Smith; Carey Spear
- Home stadium: Vanderbilt Stadium

2011 Southeastern Conference football standings
	Conf.			Overall
Team	W		L	W		L
Eastern Division
No. 19 Georgia x	7	–	1	10	–	4
No. 9 South Carolina	6	–	2	11	–	2
Florida	3	–	5	7	–	6
Vanderbilt	2	–	6	6	–	7
Kentucky	2	–	6	5	–	7
Tennessee	1	–	7	5	–	7
Western Division
No. 2 LSU x$	8	–	0	13	–	1
No. 1 Alabama %#	7	–	1	12	–	1
No. 5 Arkansas	6	–	2	11	–	2
Auburn	4	–	4	8	–	5
Mississippi State	2	–	6	7	–	6
Ole Miss*	0	–	8	2	–	10
Championship: LSU 42, Georgia 10
# – BCS National Champion; $ – BCS representative as conference champion; % – BCS at-large representative; x – Division champion/co-champions; * Ole Miss vacated all wins due to NCAA violations.; Rankings from AP Poll

The 2011 Vanderbilt Commodores football team represented Vanderbilt University during the 2011 NCAA Division I FBS football season. The Commodores played their seven home games at Vanderbilt Stadium at Dudley Field in Nashville, Tennessee, which has been Vanderbilt football's home stadium since 1922. The team's head coach was James Franklin, who was in his first year at Vanderbilt. Hired at Vanderbilt on December 17, 2010, he was previously the offensive coordinator and "head coach in waiting" at the University of Maryland. Vanderbilt has been a member of the Southeastern Conference (SEC) since the league's inception in 1932, and has participated in the conference's Eastern Division since its formation for the 1992 season. Vanderbilt completed the 2011 regular season with an overall record of 6–6 and a mark of 2–6 in conference play, finishing in a tie with Kentucky for fourth place in the SEC East. They were invited to the Liberty Bowl where they were defeated by Cincinnati 24–31 to finish the season 6–7. 2011. The seniors of the 2011 Vanderbilt football team became the first class in program history to qualify for two bowl games while at the school. Vanderbilt had only been to bowls in 1955 vs. Auburn, 1974 vs. Texas Tech, 1982 vs. Air Force, and 2008 vs. Boston College.

== Coaching changes ==
At the end of the 2010 season, head coach Robbie Caldwell resigned from Vanderbilt. After a long nationwide coaching search, in which Gus Malzahn, Auburn's offensive coordinator, nearly accepted the job, James Franklin was hired as the 27th head football coach at Vanderbilt University. Franklin proceeded to hire John Donovan as the new offensive coordinator and Bob Shoop as the new defensive coordinator. Franklin also retained Herb Hand as offensive line coach from the previous Vanderbilt staff, and hired Chris Beatty from West Virginia, who had been Percy Harvin's high school coach, as the new wide receivers coach.

== Recruiting ==
On February 2, 2011, Franklin announced a football recruiting class of 21 athletes. The class has been hailed as one of the best in Vanderbilt football history, especially because Vanderbilt was able to persuade several prospects from larger and nationally known schools, such as Lafonte Thourogood from Virginia Tech, Dillon Van der Wal from Arizona State, and Barron Dixon from Mississippi State. Lafonte Thourogood and Dillon van der Wal were both rated as four star recruits by Scout.com.

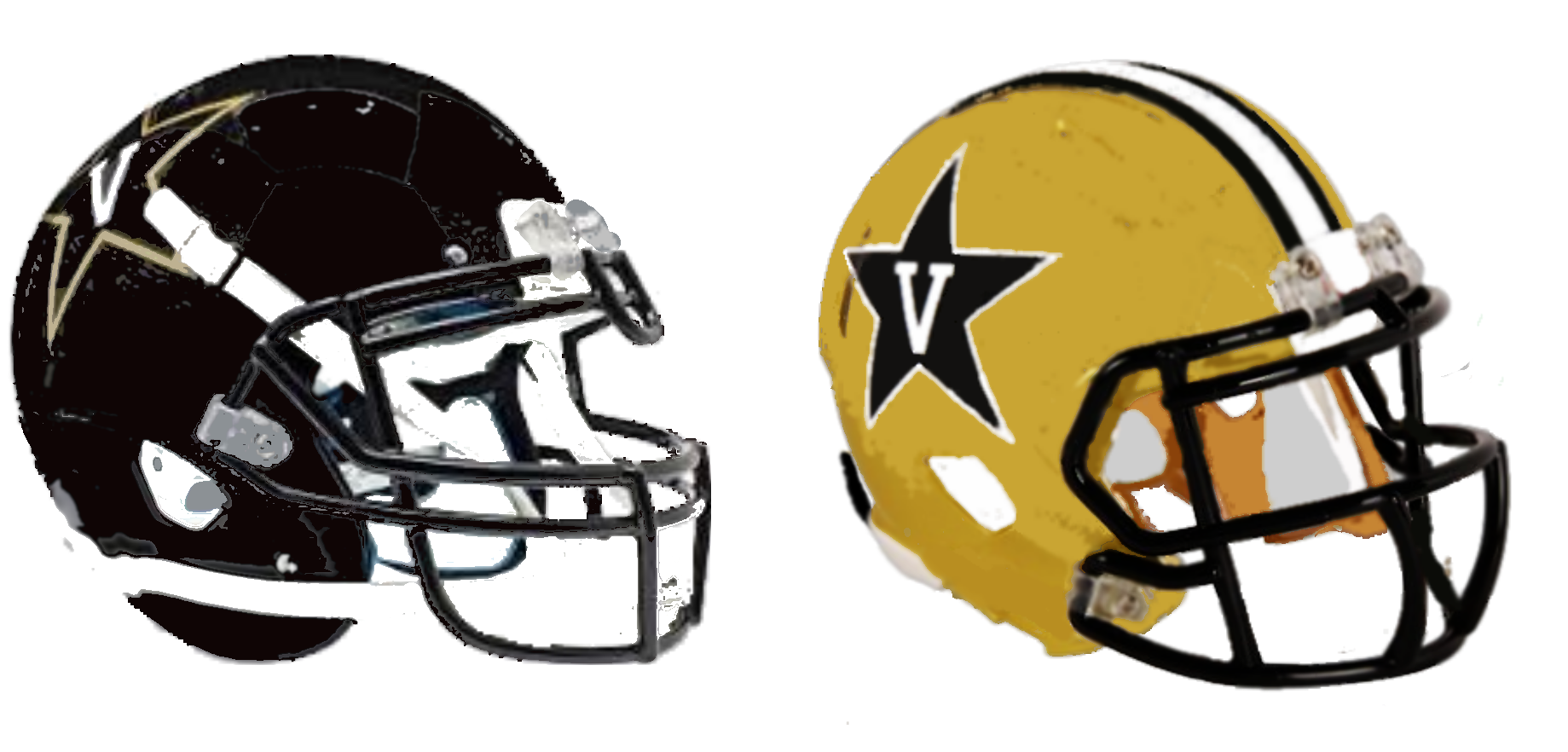
In 2011 Vanderbilt introduced a new black helmet

== Schedule ==
Date	Time	Opponent	Site	TV	Result	Attendance
September 3	6:30 p.m.	Elon*	Vanderbilt Stadium; Nashville, TN	CSS	W 45–14	27,599
September 10	6:30 p.m.	Connecticut*	Vanderbilt Stadium; Nashville, TN	CSS	W 24–21	32,119
September 17	11:21 a.m.	Ole Miss	Vanderbilt Stadium; Nashville, TN (rivalry)	SECN	W 30–7	34,579
September 24	6:00 p.m.	at No. 12 South Carolina	Williams-Brice Stadium; Columbia, SC	ESPN2	L 3–21	77,015
October 8	6:00 p.m.	at No. 2 Alabama	Bryant–Denny Stadium; Tuscaloosa, AL	ESPNU	L 0–34	101,821
October 15	6:00 p.m.	Georgia	Vanderbilt Stadium; Nashville, TN (rivalry)	FS South	L 28–33	36,640
October 22	6:00 p.m.	Army*^{†}	Vanderbilt Stadium; Nashville, TN	ESPNU	W 44–21	32,210
October 29	11:21 a.m.	No. 8 Arkansas	Vanderbilt Stadium; Nashville, TN	SECN	L 28–31	33,247
November 5	11:21 a.m.	at Florida	Ben Hill Griffin Stadium; Gainesville, FL	SECN	L 21–26	90,144
November 12	11:21 a.m.	Kentucky	Vanderbilt Stadium; Nashville, TN (rivalry)	SECN	W 38–8	33,718
November 19	6:00 p.m.	at Tennessee	Neyland Stadium; Knoxville, TN (rivalry)	ESPNU	L 21–27 ^{OT}	91,367
November 26	2:30 p.m.	at Wake Forest*	BB&T Field; Winston-Salem, NC	ESPNU	W 41–7	28,020
December 31	2:30 p.m.	vs. Cincinnati*	Liberty Bowl Memorial Stadium; Memphis, TN (Liberty Bowl)	ABC	L 24–31	57,103
*Non-conference game; ^{†}Homecoming; Rankings from AP Poll released prior to the game; All times are in Central time

== Coaching staff ==
Name	Position	Years at VU
James Franklin	Head coach	1st
John Donovan	Offensive coordinator / running backs coach	1st
Bob Shoop	Defensive coordinator / safeties coach	1st
Charles Bankins	Special teams coordinator / tight ends coach	1st
Chris Beatty	Wide receivers coach	1st
Herb Hand	Offensive line coach	1st
Wesley McGriff	Defensive backs coach	1st
Ricky Rahne	Quarterbacks Coach	1st
Brent Pry	Co-defensive Coordinator / linebackers coach	1st
Sean Spencer	Defensive line coach	1st
Andy Frank	Assistant Director of football operations	3rd
Jemal Griffin	Football Chief of Staff	1st
Michael Hazel	Director of football operations	3rd
Robert Livingston	Defensive Quality Control Coach	1st
Norval McKenzie	Assistant Recruiting Coordinator	3rd
Joey Orck	Offensive Graduate Assistant	3rd
Tom Bossung	Head Athletic Trainer	13th
Kevin Colon	Associate Director of student athletics	1st
Dwight Galt	Football Strength and Conditioning Director	1st
Chuck Losey	Football Assistant Strength Coach	1st
Kevin Threlkel	Offensive Administrative Assistant	1st
Luke Wyatt	Head Equipment Manager	29th

== Game summaries ==
=== Elon ===
This game marked the first meeting between these schools.

Team	1	2	3	4	Total
Elon	0	7	7	0	14
• Vanderbilt	7	14	3	21	45

- Location: Nashville, Tennessee
- Game start: 6:30 p.m.
- Elapsed time: 3:00
- Game attendance: 27,599
- Game weather: 97, Partly Cloudy
- Referee: Mike Austin
- Television network: CSS

=== Connecticut ===
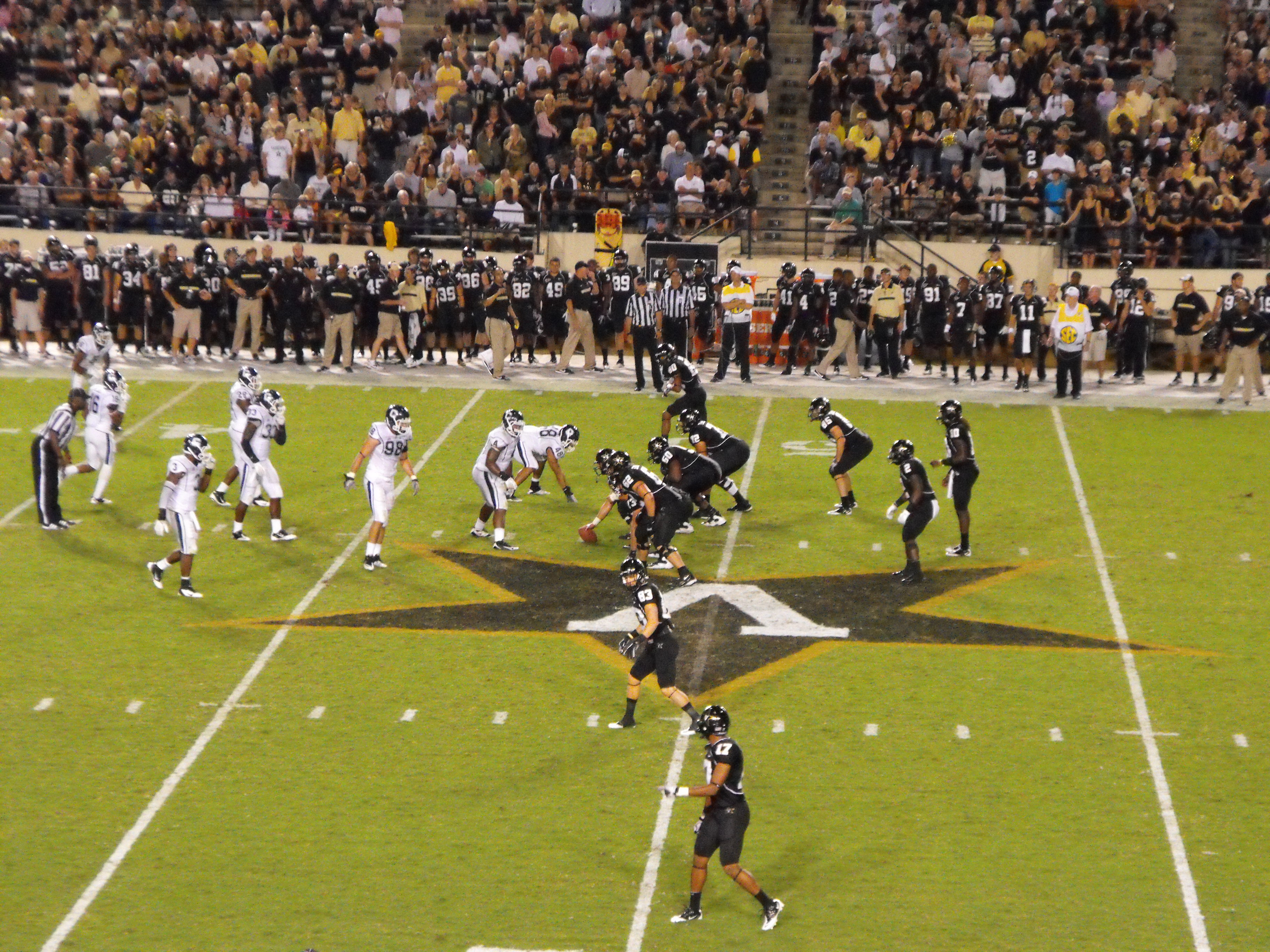
Connecticut Game

This was the third meeting between these schools. Vandy holds a one-game lead in the series at 2 wins to 1 loss.

Team	1	2	3	4	Total
Connecticut	3	0	10	8	21
• Vanderbilt	14	0	0	10	24

- Location: Nashville, Tennessee
- Game start: 6:30 p.m.
- Elapsed time: 3:11
- Game attendance: 32,119
- Game weather: 80, Scattered Clouds
- Referee: John McDaid
- Television network: CSS

=== Mississippi ===
One of college football's oldest rivalries, Vanderbilt and Old Miss have played 85 times since 1894. Vandy won the first 19 of those games, and Ole Miss did not score in the first ten games. Vandy trails at 37–47–2 Vandy won last game 30–7.

Team	1	2	3	4	Total
Mississippi	0	0	0	7	7
• Vanderbilt	0	21	9	0	30

- Location: Nashville, Tennessee
- Game start: 11:21 a.m.
- Elapsed time: 3:21
- Game attendance: 34,579
- Game weather: 69, Partly Cloudy
- Referee: Hubert Owens
- TV announcers (SEC Network): Dave Neal (play-by-play), Andre Ware (color), Cara Capuano (sideline)

=== South Carolina ===
Vandy first played USC in 1961, but they did not play each other again until 1992. They have played each year since, with Vandy losing the first seven games. Vandy trails the overall series 4–16, and USC has won the last two games. The score of the most recent game was 3–21 in favor of South Carolina.

Team	1	2	3	4	Total
Vanderbilt	3	0	0	0	3
• #12 South Carolina	0	14	7	0	21

- Location: Columbia, South Carolina
- Game start: 7:00 p.m.
- Elapsed time: 3:19
- Game attendance: 77,015
- Game weather: 79, Partly Cloudy
- Referee: Marc Curles
- TV announcers (ESPN2): Mark Jones (play-by-play), Ed Cunningham (color), Jeannine Edwards (sideline)

=== Alabama ===
Vandy has played Alabama 78 times since 1903. Vandy won the first five games, but have only won ten more times since. Vandy trails the all-time series 15–59–4. Alabama has won the last 20 games (the 1993 games was forfeited). They last played in 2007, with the result a 10–24 Alabama win.

Team	1	2	3	4	Total
Vanderbilt	0	0	0	0	0
• #2 Alabama	7	7	13	7	34

- Location: Tuscaloosa, Alabama
- Game start: 6:00 p.m.
- Elapsed time: 2:59
- Game attendance: 101,821
- Game weather: 77, Sunny
- Referee: Penn Wagers
- TV announcers (ESPNU): Clay Matvick (play-by-play), Brian Griese (color), Allison Williams (sideline)

=== Georgia ===
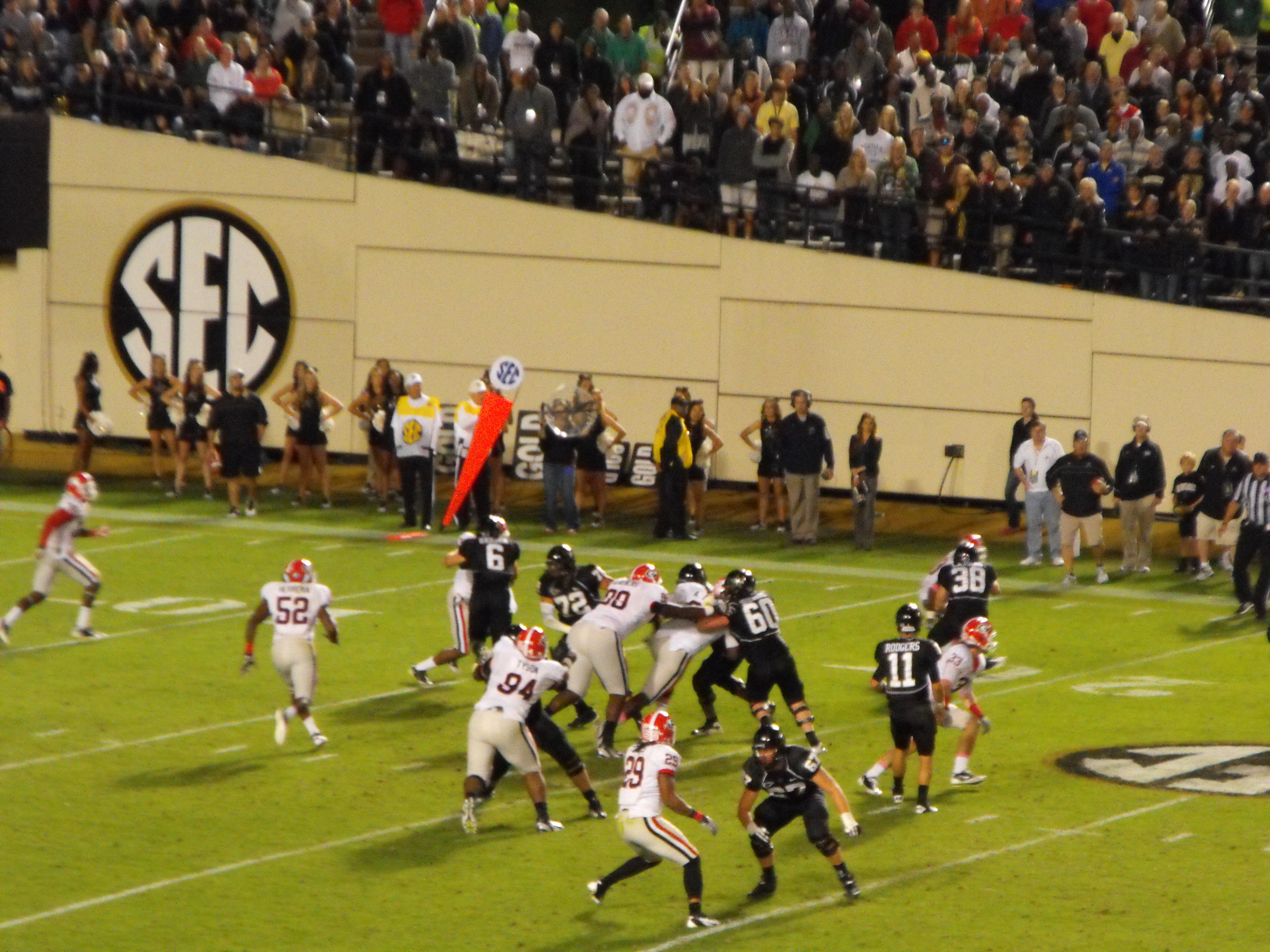
Vs. Georgia

Vandy has been playing Georgia almost every year since 1893. Vandy trails 18–51–2 all-time. Georgia has won the last three games, and the last game was 10–34 Georgia.

Team	1	2	3	4	Total
• Georgia	0	20	6	7	33
Vanderbilt	0	7	14	7	28

- Location: Nashville, Tennessee
- Game start: 6:00 p.m.
- Elapsed time: 3:34
- Game attendance: 36,640
- Game weather: 68, Clear
- Referee: Matt Austin
- TV announcers (FS South): Bob Rathbun (play-by-play), Tim Couch (color), Kristin Akra (sideline)

=== Army ===
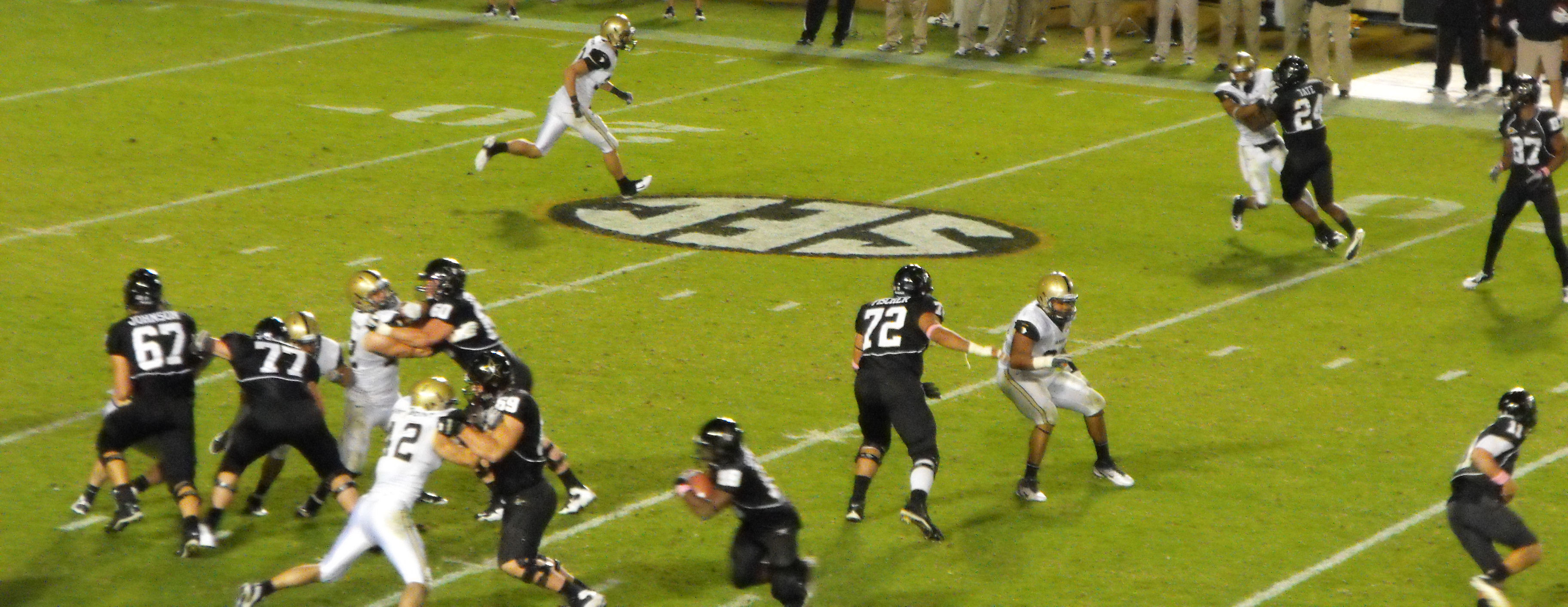
Vs. 2011 Army Black Knights

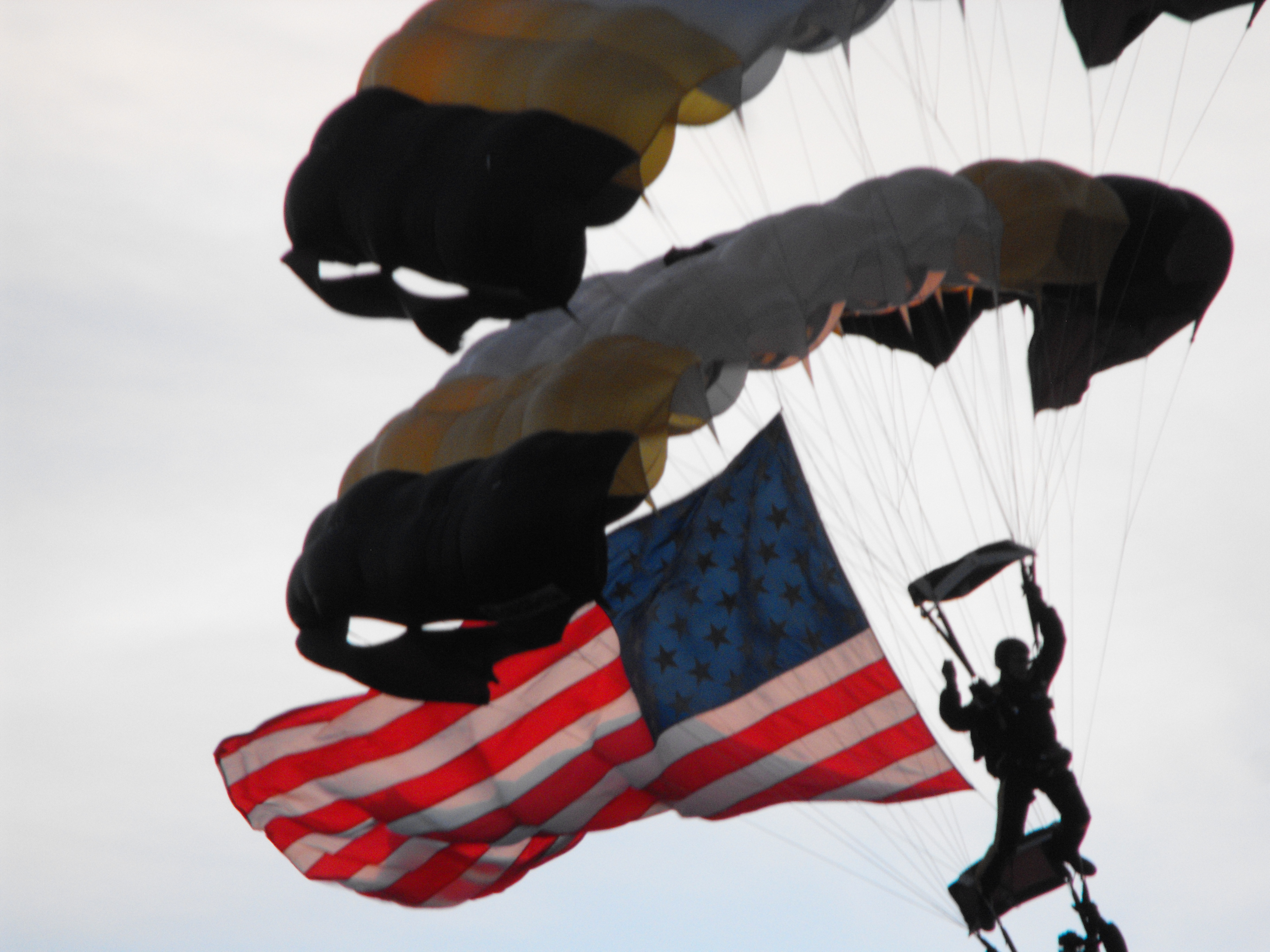
101st Screaming Eagles at Vanderbilt-Army game

Army and Vandy have played eight games since 1968. The series is tied at 4 games each. In 2009, Army won their last meeting in overtime, 13–16.

Team	1	2	3	4	Total
Army	6	0	8	7	21
• Vanderbilt	13	10	14	7	44

- Location: Nashville, Tennessee
- Game start: 6:00 p.m.
- Elapsed time: 3:15
- Game attendance: 32,210
- Game weather: 50, Broken Clouds
- Referee: David Smith
- TV announcers (ESPNU): Clay Matvick (play-by-play), Brian Griese (color), Allison Williams (sideline)

Scoring summary
1	10:48	VAN	Zac Stacy 1-yard run (Carey Spear kick)	VAN 7-0
1	10:03	VAN	Chris Boyd 43-yard pass from Jordan Rodgers (kick failed)	VAN 13-0
1	6:05	ARMY	Malcolm Brown 6-yard run (kick failed)	VAN 13-6
2	4:49	VAN	Jordan Rodgers 12-yard run (Carey Spear kick)	VAN 20-6
2	0:37	VAN	Carey Spear 37-yard field goal	VAN 23-6
3	6:39	VAN	Jerron Seymour 5-yard run (Carey Spear kick)	VAN 30-6
3	5:39	VAN	Zac Stacy 8-yard run (Carey Spear kick)	VAN 37-6
3	1:39	ARMY	Angel Santiago 1-yard run (Angel Santiago to Larry Dixon pass)	VAN 37-14
4	11:52	ARMY	Geoffrey Bacon 70-yard interception return (Alex Carlton kick)	VAN 37-21
4	6:38	VAN	Zac Stacy 55-yard run (Ryan Fowler kick)	VAN 44-21

=== Arkansas ===
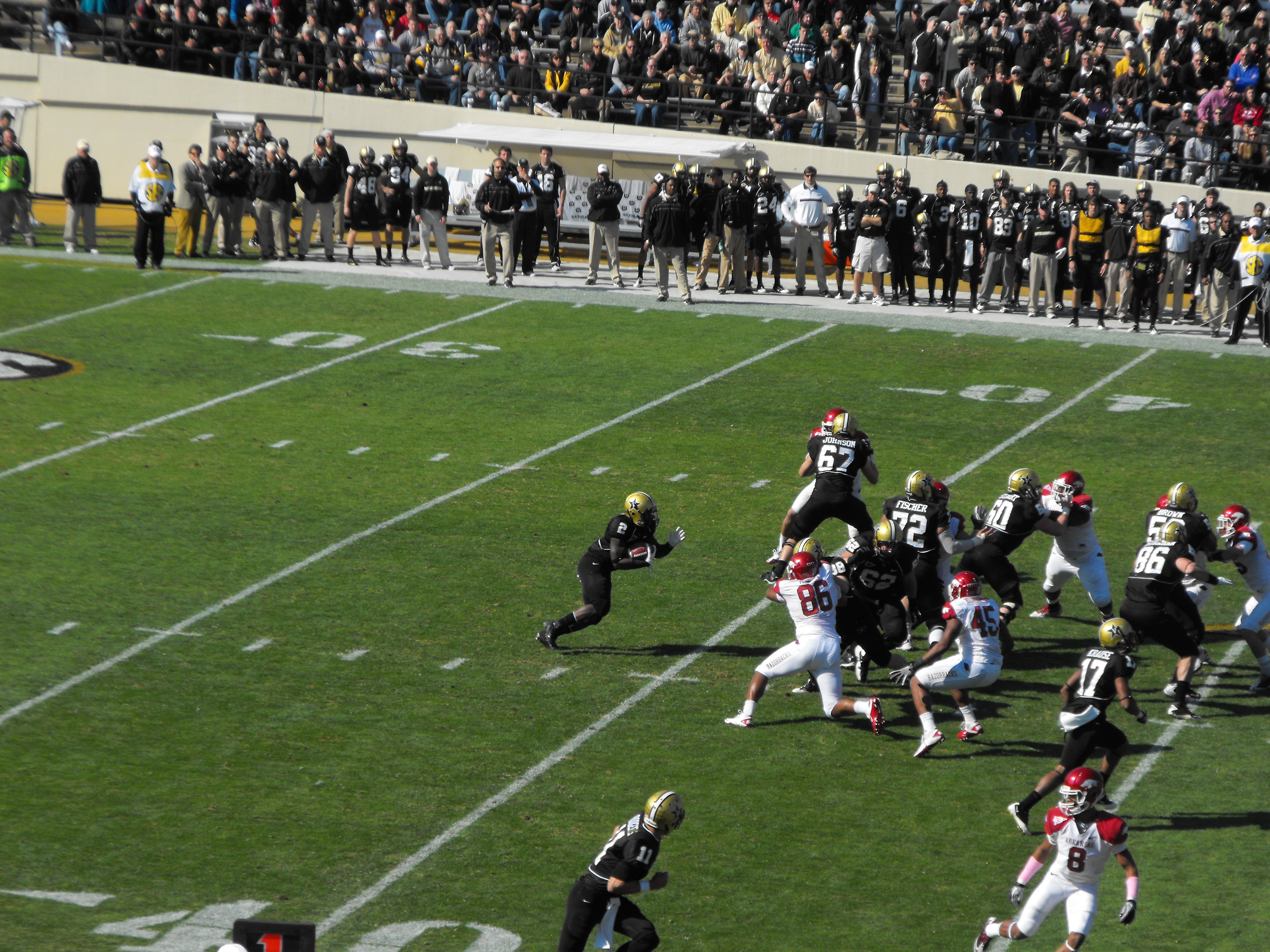
Vs. Arkansas Razorbacks

Vandy has played Arkansas eight times since 1949. Vandy trails the series 2–6, and Arkansas has won the last two last games. The last game was an Arkansas win, 14–49. Vanderbilt had a chance to tie the game with :12 left in the 4th quarter, but Carey Spear missed a 27-yard field goal and hooked it right. The Hogs survived their second upset of the season, with Ole Miss being their first.

Team	1	2	3	4	Total
• #8 Arkansas	7	7	6	11	31
Vanderbilt	7	14	7	0	28

- Location: Nashville, Tennessee
- Game start: 11:21 a.m.
- Elapsed time: 3:24
- Game attendance: 33,247
- Game weather: 40, Clear
- Referee: Marc Curles
- TV announcers (SEC Network): Dave Neal (play-by-play), Andre Ware (color), Cara Capuano (sideline)

=== Florida ===
Vandy and Florida have been playing since 1945. Vandy trails 9–33–2, and Vandy has lost the last 20 games. In their last meeting, Florida won 14–55.

Team	1	2	3	4	Total
Vanderbilt	0	0	7	14	21
• Florida	0	17	3	6	26

- Location: Gainesville, Florida
- Game start: 12:21 p.m.
- Elapsed time: 3:16
- Game attendance: 90,144
- Game weather: 59, Cloudy
- Referee: Penn Wagers
- TV announcers (SEC Network): Dave Neal (play-by-play), Andre Ware (color), Cara Capuano (sideline)

=== Kentucky ===
Vandy and Kentucky have played 83 times since 1896. Vandy won the first nine games, and Kentucky did not score on Vandy for the first eleven games. Vandy trails 38–41–4, and Kentucky has won the last two games. The last game was a 20–38 Kentucky victory.

Team	1	2	3	4	Total
Kentucky	0	0	8	0	8
• Vanderbilt	7	17	7	7	38

- Location: Nashville, Tennessee
- Game start: 11:21 a.m.
- Elapsed time: 3:08
- Game attendance: 33,718
- Game weather: 56, Partly Cloudy
- Referee: Matt Moore
- TV announcers (SEC Network): Dave Neal (play-by-play), Andre Ware (color), Cara Capuano (sideline)

=== Tennessee ===
Vandy and Tennessee have played 105 times. Vandy did not lose for the first 12 games, but since 1928 UT has dominated the series. Overall, Vandy trails 27–72–5. Tennessee has won the last five games in the series, and the last game was a 10–24 Tennessee win.

Team	1	2	3	4	OT	Total
Vanderbilt	0	7	7	7	0	21
• Tennessee	7	7	0	7	6	27

- Location: Knoxville, Tennessee
- Game start: 7:00 p.m.
- Elapsed time: 3:21
- Game attendance: 91,367
- Game weather: 52, Clear
- Referee: Marc Curles
- TV announcers (ESPNU): Clay Matvick (play-by-play), Brian Griese (color), Allison Williams (sideline)

=== Wake Forest ===
Vandy and Wake Forest have played 13 times since 1964, and this is the only series in which Vandy plays during the 2011 football season that Vandy holds the all-time lead in, at 7–6–0. Wake, however, has won the last three. The last game was a 13–34 Wake Forest win.

Team	1	2	3	4	Total
• Vanderbilt	6	21	7	7	41
Wake Forest	0	7	0	0	7

- Location: Winston-Salem, North Carolina
- Game start: 3:30 p.m.
- Elapsed time: 3:12
- Game attendance: 28,020
- Game weather: 65, Sunny and Fair
- Referee: Ken Williamson
- Television network: ESPNU

=== Cincinnati ===
Vanderbilt and Cincinnati had met six times, dating back to 1898. Cincinnati holds the lead with 4 wins.

Liberty Bowl

Team	1	2	3	4	Total
Vanderbilt	7	0	7	10	24
• Cincinnati	0	14	0	17	31

- Location: Memphis, Tennessee
- Game start: 2:30 p.m.
- Game attendance: 57,103
- Television network: ABC
