= Brad Wing =

Australian gridiron football player (born 1991)

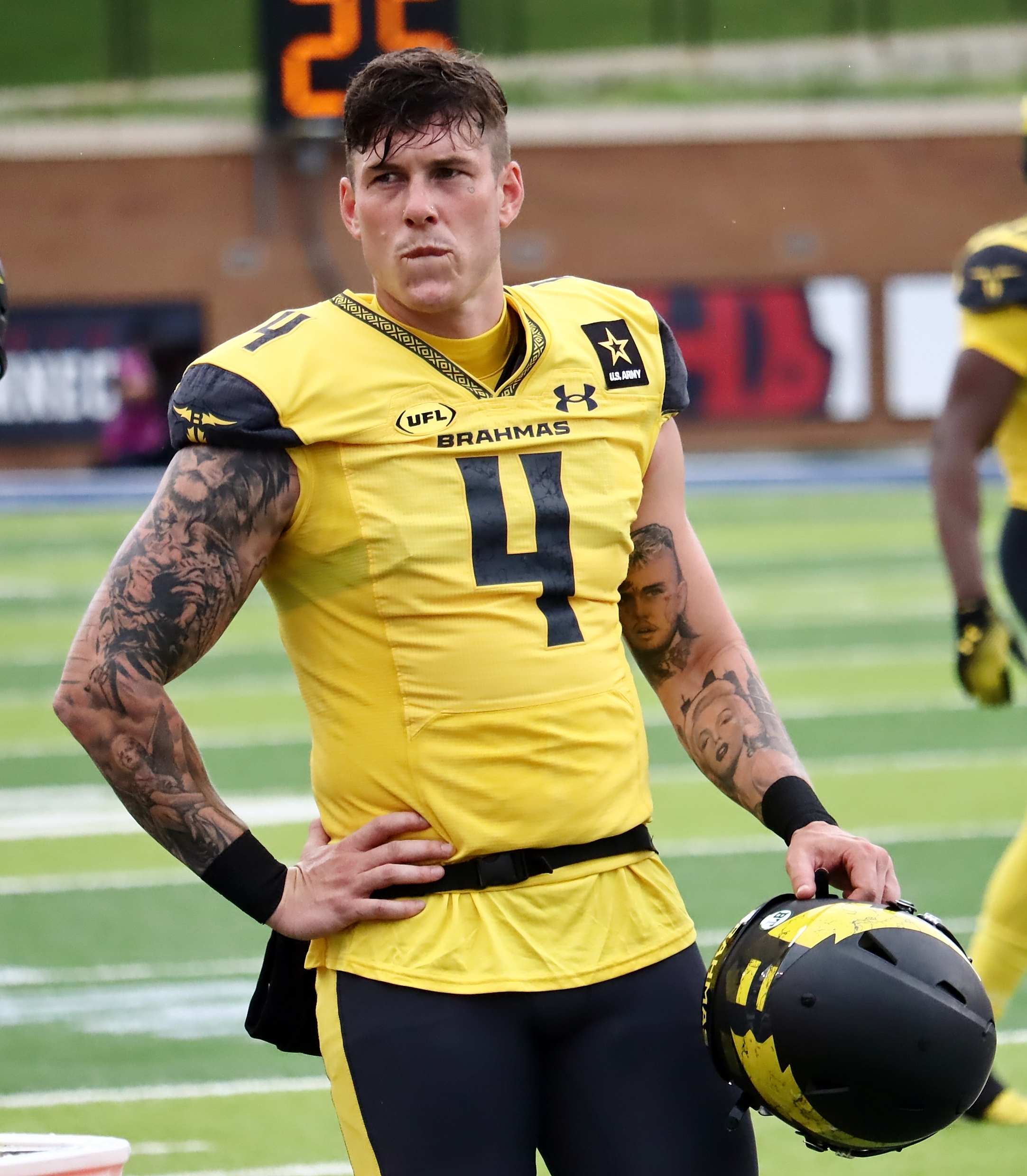
- Wing with the San Antonio Brahmas in 2024

Profile
- Position: Punter

Personal information
- Born: 27 January 1991 (age 35); Melbourne, Victoria, Australia
- Listed height: 6 ft 3 in (1.91 m)
- Listed weight: 204 lb (93 kg)

Career information
- High school: Parkview Baptist (Baton Rouge, Louisiana, U.S.)
- College: LSU
- NFL draft: 2013: undrafted

Career history
- Philadelphia Eagles (2013)*; Pittsburgh Steelers (2014); New York Giants (2015–2017); Memphis Express (2019); San Antonio Brahmas (2023); Pittsburgh Steelers (2023); San Antonio Brahmas (2024–2025)
- * Offseason or practice squad member only

Awards and highlights
- All-UFL Team (2025); XFL punting yards leader (2023); First-team All-American (2011); First-team All-SEC (2011)

Career NFL statistics
- Punts: 336
- Punting yards: 15,028
- Average punt: 44.7
- Inside 20: 103
- Stats at Pro Football Reference

Bradley Thomas Wing (born 27 January 1991) is an Australian professional American football punter. He was signed by the Philadelphia Eagles as an undrafted free agent in 2013. He played college football for LSU.

Wing achieved fame during several nationally televised games for his accuracy and leg strength in LSU's punting game. He was also the first college football player to be penalized under a new rule regarding on-field taunting during scoring plays.

== Early life ==
Wing was born in Melbourne, Victoria, Australia. His parents are Kathi and David Wing. His father David tried out with the Detroit Lions, then punted professionally for the Scottish Claymores. Growing up, Wing played Australian rules football which he says has contributed to his ability to punt so accurately. The younger Wing was cut from his TAC Cup club, the Sandringham Dragons, ending his Australian rules career. At that time, family friends of the Wings in Baton Rouge, Louisiana offered to host him for his senior year of high school as part of a student exchange program while trying out American football punting. He attended Parkview Baptist High School, where he was named All-State. During one of his football games, his mom, Kathi, coincidentally sat next to Les Miles' wife, Kathy. Kathy Miles said Wing played well and she would let Les Miles know to "keep him on the radar." Wing then was notified that he was being recruited by LSU. He eventually received a scholarship offer from LSU. Notably, he did not recognize LSU head coach Les Miles when the latter made his first visit to recruit him; he had to be told who Miles was. His family moved to Baton Rouge during the 2011 season in order to be with him during his LSU career.

== College career ==
As a redshirt freshman, Wing averaged 43.0 yards per punt in 42 punts with a long of 73 yards through 12 games. That same year, he landed 20 punts inside the opponent's 20-yard line. In top-ranked LSU's 9–6 overtime win at Alabama in the 2011 season, Wing kicked a 73-yard punt, hitting a camera wire, forcing overtime. Wing gained notoriety during a game against the Florida Gators by stretching his arms out during a fake punt play on his way to a 52-yard touchdown. Due to a new rule taking effect that season, Wing was flagged for taunting, and the touchdown was nullified. Going into the BCS National Championship Game against Alabama, opponents had attempted to return Wing's punts only 17 times for a total of 6 yards. During 2011 and 2012, Wing averaged 44.6 yards per punt, which is the highest in school history for a player with at least 100 punts. Wing was suspended from the 2012 Chick-fil-A Bowl for an "undisclosed violation of team rules." However, in a podcast episode, Wing disclosed that he was asked to leave LSU for failing drug tests. The school did not state this publicly and instead cited "academic misconduct" and "violation of team rules" for Wing's leaving.

On 4 January 2013, Wing announced that he would enter the 2013 NFL draft.

== Professional career ==
Pre-draft measurables
Height	Weight	Arm length	Hand span
6 ft 2 3/8 in (1.89 m)	205 lb (93 kg)	32 in (0.81 m)	9 1/2 in (0.24 m)
All values from NFL Combine

=== Philadelphia Eagles ===
After Wing went undrafted in the 2013 NFL draft, the Philadelphia Eagles signed him to compete with fellow former LSU punter Donnie Jones in training camp. He was waived on 25 August 2014.

=== Pittsburgh Steelers (first stint) ===
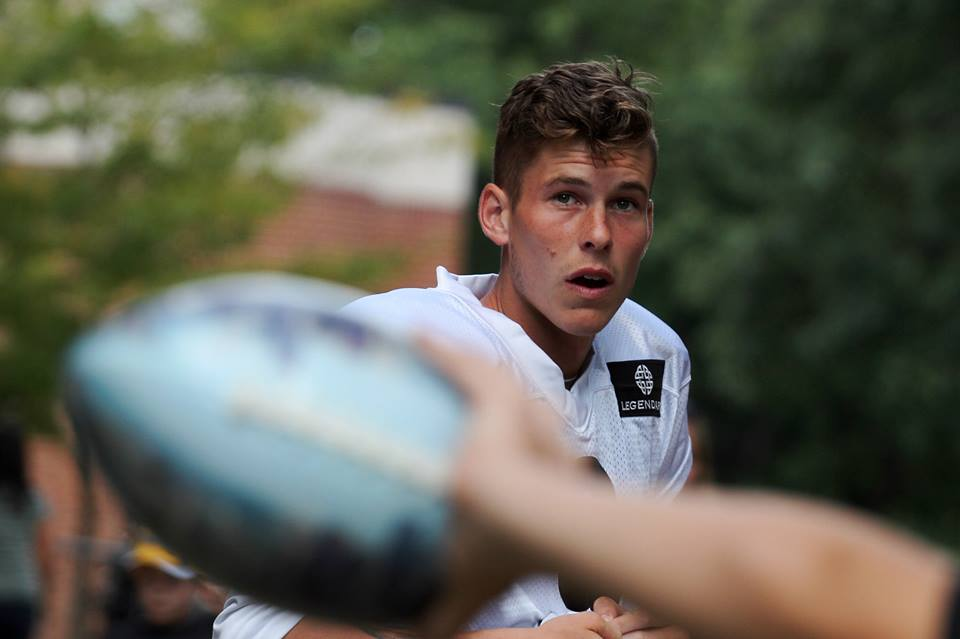
Wing with the Steelers in 2014

In 2014, Wing signed a contract with the Pittsburgh Steelers to serve as the punter and holder for field goals and PATs. In the fourth quarter of a game against the Tampa Bay Buccaneers, his punt went only 29 yards, giving the ball to the Buccaneers at the Steelers' 46-yard line with 40 seconds to go. The Buccaneers scored the game-winning touchdown a few plays later.

In a game against the Baltimore Ravens on 2 November 2014, following a botched snap on the extra point for which Wing was the holder, he completed a pass to Matt Spaeth for a two-point conversion, and thus became the first Australian player in NFL history to score from a pass.

=== New York Giants ===
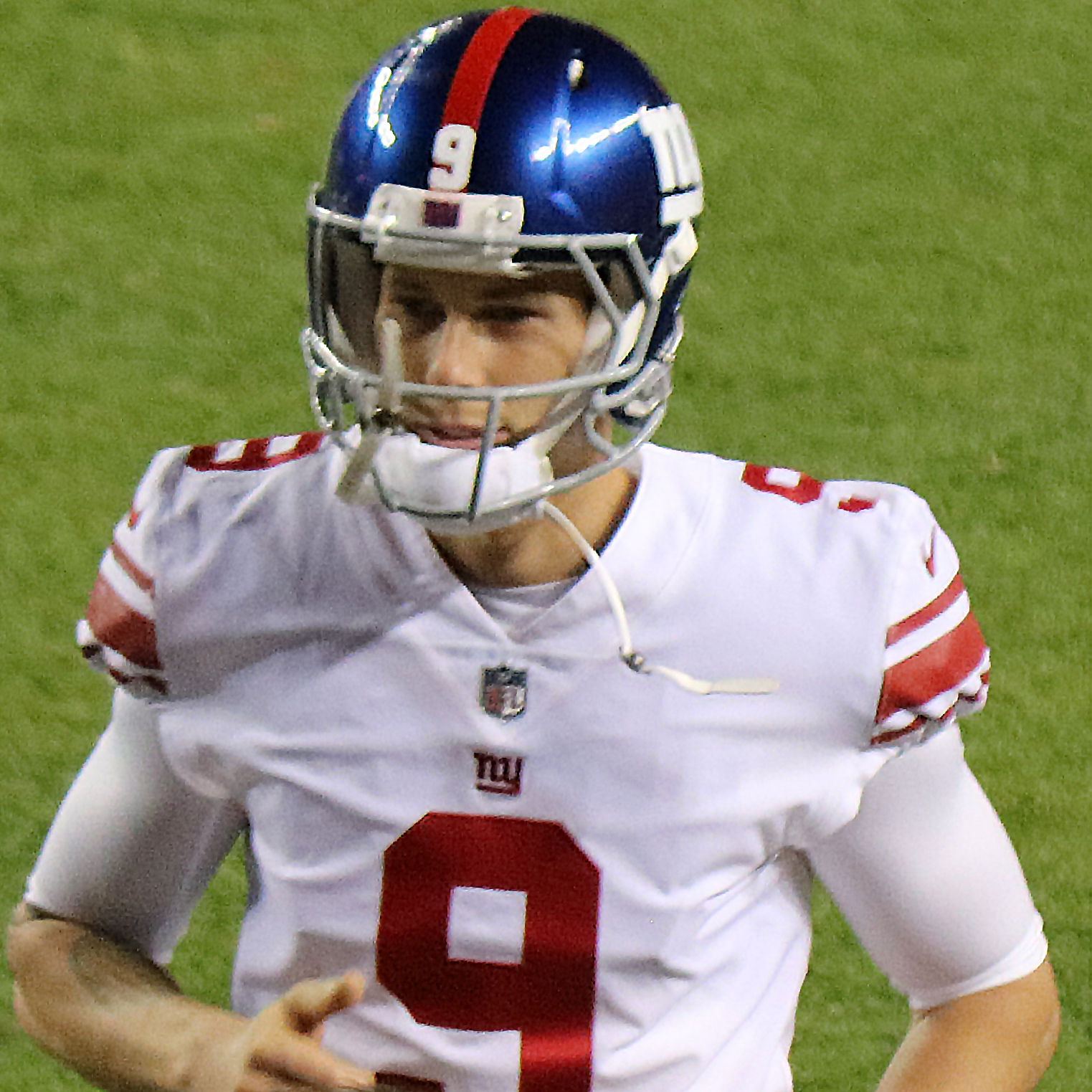
Wing with the Giants in 2017

On 4 September 2015, Wing was traded to the New York Giants for a seventh-round draft pick. After the Giants acquired Wing from the Steelers, veteran punter Steve Weatherford was released the same day. In 2015, he punted 76 times and had a 44.5-yard gross average and a 38.9-yard net average. 33 of his punts were downed inside the 20-yard line, which tied the Giants’ single-season record set by Brad Maynard in both 1997 and 1998. On 11 July 2016, Wing signed a 3-year contract extension with the Giants. The extension was reportedly worth three years and $6.45 million.

Wing earned NFC Special Teams Player of the Week for two weeks in a row. In Week 14 against the Dallas Cowboys, Wing pinned the Cowboys inside the 20-yard line five times and in Week 15 for booting seven punts averaging 40 yards downing two inside the 20-yard line.

On 10 March 2018, Wing was released by the Giants.

=== Memphis Express ===
In 2018, Wing signed with the Memphis Express of the AAF for the 2019 season. He was waived on 27 February 2019.

=== San Antonio Brahmas (first stint) ===
Wing was selected with the 23rd pick in the Specialists Phase of the 2023 XFL draft by the San Antonio Brahmas. He was released from his contract on 27 September 2023.

=== Pittsburgh Steelers (second stint) ===
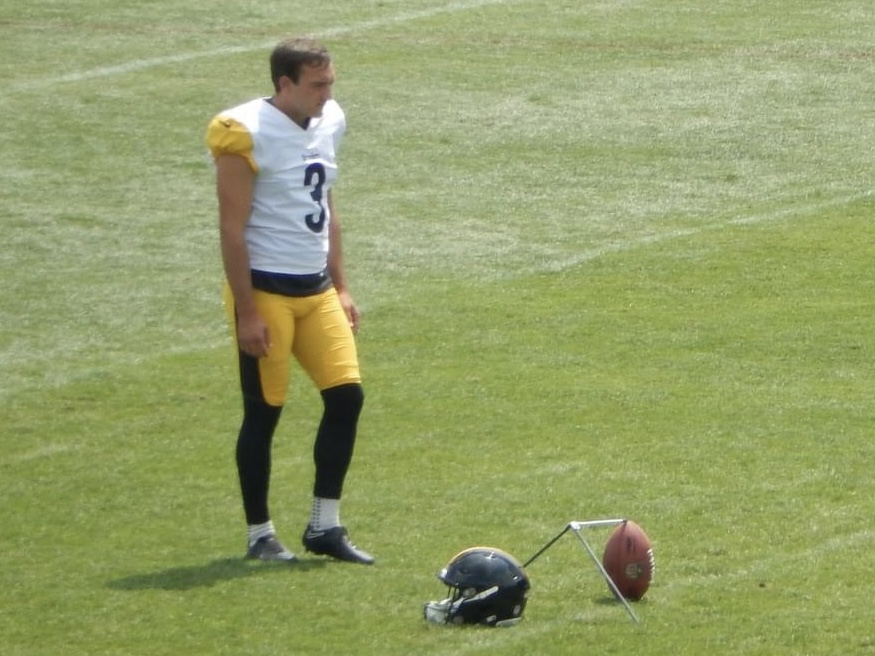
Wing with the Steelers in 2023.

On 27 September 2023, Wing was signed to the Steelers' practice squad. He was elevated to the active roster on 30 September after Steelers starting punter Pressley Harvin was ruled out with an injury, marking Wing's first NFL game since the 2017 season. After two games with the team, Wing was released on 9 October. Wing re-signed to the practice squad on 10 January. He was not signed to a reserve/future contract after the season and thus became a free agent when his practice squad contract expired.

=== San Antonio Brahmas (second stint) ===
On 6 February 2024, Wing re-signed with the San Antonio Brahmas. He re-signed with the team again on 16 September. Wing was named for the 2025 All-UFL Team.

== NFL career statistics ==
Legend
	Led the league
**Bold**	Career high

=== Regular season ===
Year	Team	Punting									
Year	Team	GP	Punts	Yds	Net Yds	Lng	Avg	Net Avg	Blk	Ins20	TB
2014	PIT	**16**	61	2,667	2,367	**74**	43.7	38.8	0	20	4
2015	NYG	**16**	76	3,380	2,960	64	44.5	38.9	0	**33**	6
2016	NYG	**16**	93	**4,297**	**3,807**	63	**46.2**	**40.9**	0	28	8
2017	NYG	**16**	**95**	4,189	3,561	69	44.1	36.7	**2**	19	**9**
2023	PIT	2	11	495	428	52	45.0	38.9	0	3	2
Career		66	336	15,028	13,123	74	44.7	38.8	2	103	29

=== Playoffs ===
Year	Team	Punting									
Year	Team	GP	Punts	Yds	Net Yds	Lng	Avg	Net Avg	Blk	Ins20	TB
2014	PIT	**1**	3	115	115	48	38.3	**38.3**	0	**2**	0
2016	NYG	**1**	**8**	**312**	**262**	**55**	**39.0**	32.8	0	**2**	0
Career		2	11	427	377	55	38.8	34.3	0	4	0
