= 2011 Louisiana Tech Bulldogs football team =

American college football season

2011 Louisiana Tech Bulldogs football

WAC champion

Poinsettia Bowl, L 24–31 vs. TCU
- Conference: Western Athletic Conference
- Record: 8–5 (6–1 WAC)
- Head coach: Sonny Dykes (2nd season)
- Offensive coordinator: Tony Franklin (2nd season)
- Offensive scheme: Air raid
- Defensive coordinator: Tommy Spangler (5th season)
- Base defense: 4–2–5
- Captains: Adrien Cole; Nick Isham
- Home stadium: Joe Aillet Stadium

2011 Western Athletic Conference football standings
	Conf.			Overall
Team	W		L	W		L
Louisiana Tech $	6	–	1	8	–	5
Nevada	5	–	2	7	–	6
Utah State	5	–	2	7	–	6
Hawaii	3	–	4	6	–	7
San Jose State	3	–	4	5	–	7
Fresno State	3	–	4	4	–	9
New Mexico State	2	–	5	4	–	9
Idaho	1	–	6	2	–	10
$ – Conference champion

The 2011 Louisiana Tech Bulldogs football team represented Louisiana Tech University as a member of the Western Athletic Conference (WAC) during the 2011 NCAA Division I FBS football season. Led by second-year head coach Sonny Dykes, the Bulldogs played their home games at Joe Aillet Stadium in Ruston, Louisiana. Louisiana Tech finished the regular season with an 8–4 overall record and a 6–1 mark in conference play to win the WAC title. The Bulldogs lost the Poinsettia Bowl in San Diego against the TCU Horned Frogs, the champions of the Mountain West Conference.

== Before the season ==
=== Recruiting ===
College recruiting (2011)
Name	Hometown	School	Height	Weight	40^{‡}	Commit date
Larry Banks; OL	Fayette, Mississippi	Copiah-Lincoln CC	6 ft 4 in (1.93 m)	325 lb (147 kg)	–	Dec 15, 2010
Larry Banks; OL	Recruit ratings: Scout: Rivals: (–)					
Scott Cathcart; WR	Santa Maria, California	Allan Hancock College	6 ft 5 in (1.96 m)	220 lb (100 kg)	4.50	Dec 22, 2010
Scott Cathcart; WR	Recruit ratings: Scout: Rivals: (–)					
Jeremy Graffree; OL	Perkinston, Mississippi	Mississippi Gulf Coast CC	6 ft 3 in (1.91 m)	300 lb (140 kg)	–	Dec 22, 2010
Jeremy Graffree; OL	Recruit ratings: Scout: Rivals: (–)					
Zach Griffith; QB	Fullerton, California	Fullerton College	6 ft 3 in (1.91 m)	185 lb (84 kg)	–	Jan 13, 2011
Zach Griffith; QB	Recruit ratings: Scout: Rivals: (–)					
Chip Hester; LB	North Myrtle Beach, South Carolina	Hutchinson CC	6 ft 0 in (1.83 m)	230 lb (100 kg)	4.53	Dec 15, 2010
Chip Hester; LB	Recruit ratings: Scout: Rivals: (–)					
Oscar Johnson; OL	Crystal Springs, Mississippi	Copiah-Lincoln CC	6 ft 6.5 in (1.99 m)	350 lb (160 kg)	–	Dec 15, 2010
Oscar Johnson; OL	Recruit ratings: Scout: Rivals: (–)					
Antonio Mitchum; LB	Hemingway, South Carolina	Georgia Military College	6 ft 1 in (1.85 m)	245 lb (111 kg)	4.60	Dec 16, 2010
Antonio Mitchum; LB	Recruit ratings: Scout: Rivals: (–)					
Quinton Patton; WR	La Vergne, Tennessee	Coffeyville CC	6 ft 1 in (1.85 m)	195 lb (88 kg)	4.40	Dec 15, 2010
Quinton Patton; WR	Recruit ratings: Scout: Rivals: (–)					
Jon'al White; DL	Ruston, Louisiana	Jones County CC	6 ft 1 in (1.85 m)	300 lb (140 kg)	4.90	Dec 15, 2010
Jon'al White; DL	Recruit ratings: Scout: Rivals: (–)					
Myles White; WR	Livonia, Michigan	Northwest Mississippi CC	6 ft 1 in (1.85 m)	185 lb (84 kg)	4.40	Dec 15, 2010
Myles White; WR	Recruit ratings: Scout: Rivals: (–)					
Dirk Tanner; DL	North Little Rock, Arkansas	Pulaski Academy	6 ft 1 in (1.85 m)	270 lb (120 kg)	4.80	Feb 2, 2011
Dirk Tanner; DL	Recruit ratings: Scout: Rivals: ESPN:					
Zeke Alsander; OL	Baton Rouge, Louisiana	Southern Lab High School	6 ft 6 in (1.98 m)	300 lb (140 kg)	–	Feb 2, 2011
Zeke Alsander; OL	Recruit ratings: Scout: Rivals: ESPN:					
Daniel Hayden; DL	Poplarville, Mississippi	Pearl River CC	6 ft 4 in (1.93 m)	235 lb (107 kg)	–	Feb 2, 2011
Daniel Hayden; DL	Recruit ratings: Scout: Rivals: (–)					
Warren Bates; LB	Plaquemine, Louisiana	St. John High School	6 ft 0 in (1.83 m)	205 lb (93 kg)	4.50	Feb 2, 2011
Warren Bates; LB	Recruit ratings: Scout: Rivals: ESPN:					
Levander Liggins; ATH	Leesville, Louisiana	Leesville High School	5 ft 11 in (1.80 m)	185 lb (84 kg)	4.60	Feb 2, 2011
Levander Liggins; ATH	Recruit ratings: Scout: Rivals: ESPN:					
Brice Abraham; ATH	Jennings, Louisiana	Jennings High School	5 ft 11 in (1.80 m)	175 lb (79 kg)	4.47	Feb 2, 2011
Brice Abraham; ATH	Recruit ratings: Scout: Rivals: (–)					
Ty Hook; LB	Denton, Texas	Ryan High School	6 ft 0 in (1.83 m)	210 lb (95 kg)	4.50	Feb 2, 2011
Ty Hook; LB	Recruit ratings: Scout: Rivals: ESPN:					
Brock Waters; ATH	Sarasota, Florida	Independence CC	5 ft 10 in (1.78 m)	190 lb (86 kg)	–	Feb 2, 2011
Brock Waters; ATH	Recruit ratings: Scout: Rivals: (–)					
Beau Fitte; LB	Port Sulphur, Louisiana	South Plaquemines High School	6 ft 1 in (1.85 m)	210 lb (95 kg)	4.65	Feb 2, 2011
Beau Fitte; LB	Recruit ratings: Scout: Rivals: ESPN:					
Josh Robinson; OL	Lancaster, Texas	Lancaster High School	6 ft 4 in (1.93 m)	275 lb (125 kg)	–	Feb 2, 2011
Josh Robinson; OL	Recruit ratings: Scout: Rivals: ESPN:					
Tevin King; RB	Moultrie, Georgia	Colquitt County High School	5 ft 7 in (1.70 m)	160 lb (73 kg)	–	Feb 2, 2011
Tevin King; RB	Recruit ratings: Scout: Rivals: (–)					
Malcolm Pichon; DL	Slidell, Louisiana	Salmen High School	6 ft 3 in (1.91 m)	330 lb (150 kg)	5.00	Feb 2, 2011
Malcolm Pichon; DL	Recruit ratings: Scout: Rivals: (–)					
Tyler Porter; DL	Lafayette, Louisiana	Northside High School	6 ft 0 in (1.83 m)	310 lb (140 kg)	5.13	Feb 2, 2011
Tyler Porter; DL	Recruit ratings: Scout: Rivals: ESPN:					
Vontarrius Dora; DL	West Point, Mississippi	West Point High School	6 ft 4 in (1.93 m)	235 lb (107 kg)	–	Feb 2, 2011
Vontarrius Dora; DL	Recruit ratings: Scout: Rivals: (–)					
Nick Isham; QB	Hidden Hills, California	Westlake High School	6 ft 0 in (1.83 m)	185 lb (84 kg)	4.5	Feb 2, 2011
Nick Isham; QB	Recruit ratings: Scout: Rivals: (–)					
Overall recruit ranking: Scout: 88 ESPN: NR
‡ Refers to 40-yard dash; Note: In many cases, Scout, Rivals, 247Sports, On3, and ESPN may conflict in their listings of height, weight and 40 time.; In these cases, the average was taken. ESPN grades are on a 100-point scale.; Sources: "Scout.com Football Recruiting: Louisiana Tech". Scout.; "2011 Player Signees- Louisiana Tech". ESPN.; "Scout.com Team Recruiting Rankings". Scout.; "2011 Team Ranking". Rivals.com.

After the Spring Game at Joe Aillet Stadium, it was announced that Hunter Lee, Blake Martin, and Vincent Moore would walk on at Louisiana Tech. After playing as a wide receiver and a safety at River Oaks High School in Monroe, Louisiana, Vincent Moore plans to play safety at Louisiana Tech. Hunter Lee will likely tryout for a position at running back after earning District 8-5A MVP honors at Flower Mound High School in 2010.

=== T-Day Spring Game ===
	1	2	3	4	Total
White	0	6	0	0	6
Blue	14	14	7	0	35

On May 24, Sonny Dykes dismissed wide receivers Ahmed Paige and Tim Molton from the team due to a violation of team rules.

=== Awards and award watch lists ===
Ryan Allen

- 2011 Walter Camp Football Foundation All-American (second team)
- Winner of the 2011 Ray Guy Award
- First-Team All-WAC (punter)
- WAC Special Teams Player of the Week (Week 6)
- WAC Special Teams Player of the Week (Week 8)

Chad Boyd

- Second-Team All-WAC (defensive back)

Matt Broha

- 2011 Preseason First-Team All-WAC
- 2011 First-Team All-WAC (defensive line)

Colby Cameron

- WAC Offensive Player of the Week (Week 10)

Terry Carter

- First-Team All-WAC (defensive back)

Kris Cavitt

- First-Team All-WAC (offensive lineman)

Adrien Cole

- 2011 WAC Defensive Player of the Year
- First-Team All-WAC (linebacker)
- WAC Defensive Player of the Week (Week 8)
- WAC Defensive Player of the Week (Week 12)

Lennon Creer

- 2011 Preseason First Team All-WAC
- Doak Walker Award watch list

Jay Dudley

- Second-Team All-WAC (linebacker)

Justin Ellis

- Second-Team All-WAC (defensive lineman)

IK Enemkpali

- WAC Defensive Player of the Week (Week 11)

Craig Johnson

- WAC Special Teams Player of the Week (Week 13)

Hunter Lee

- WAC Offensive Player of the Week (Week 13)

Matt Nelson

- Second-Team All-WAC (placekicker)

Quinton Patton

- First-Team All-WAC (wide receiver)
- Fred Biletnikoff Award watch list

Tommy Spangler

- Broyles Award nominee

Stephen Warner

- First-Team All-WAC (offensive lineman)

== Schedule ==
Date	Time	Opponent	Site	TV	Result	Attendance	Source
September 3	9:00 pm	at Southern Miss*	M. M. Roberts Stadium; Hattiesburg, MS (Rivalry in Dixie)	FSN	L 17–19	22,356	
September 10	6:00 pm	No. 18 (FCS) Central Arkansas*	Joe Aillet Stadium; Ruston, LA	ESPN3	W 48–42 ^{OT}	20,652	
September 17	6:00 pm	Houston*	Joe Aillet Stadium; Ruston, LA	ESPN3	L 34–35	24,628	
September 24	6:00 pm	at Mississippi State*	Davis Wade Stadium; Starkville, MS	ESPNU	L 20–26 ^{OT}	55,116	
October 1	6:00 pm	Hawaii	Joe Aillet Stadium; Ruston, LA	ESPN Plus/CST/ALT 2	L 26–44	25,212	
October 8	4:00 pm	at Idaho	Kibbie Dome; Moscow, ID		W 24–11	15,309	
October 22	2:00 pm	at Utah State	Romney Stadium; Logan, UT	ESPN Plus/CST/ALT 2	W 24–17	16,037	
October 29	3:00 pm	San Jose State^{†}	Joe Aillet Stadium; Ruston, LA		W 38–28	19,642	
November 5	9:30 pm	at Fresno State	Bulldog Stadium; Fresno, CA	ESPNU	W 41–21	27,965	
November 12	6:30 pm	at Ole Miss*	Vaught–Hemingway Stadium; Oxford, MS	CSS/CST	W 27–7	44,123	
November 19	3:00 pm	at Nevada	Mackay Stadium; Reno, NV		W 24–20	11,639	
November 26	3:00 pm	New Mexico State	Joe Aillet Stadium; Ruston, LA	ESPN Plus/CST/ALT 2	W 44–0	17,458	
December 21	7:00 pm	vs. No. 16 TCU*	Qualcomm Stadium; San Diego, CA (Poinsettia Bowl)	ESPN	L 24–31	24,607	
*Non-conference game; ^{†}Homecoming; Rankings from AP Poll released prior to the game; All times are in Central time

== Roster ==
2011 Louisiana Tech Bulldogs football team roster
Players
Coaches
Offense

Pos.	#	Name	Class
WR	1	Richie Casey	Jr
RB/WR	2	Lyle Fitte	Jr
QB	3	Tarik Hakmi	Jr
WR	4	Quinton Patton	Jr
RB	5	Lennon Creer	Sr
QB	6	Brock Waters	Jr
WR	7	Myles White	Jr
WR	8	Jacarri Jackson	So
QB	9	Zach Griffith	So
QB	10	Colby Cameron	Jr
QB	11	Nick Isham	Fr
WR	15	Hayden Slack	So
QB	16	Taylor Burch	Fr
WR	17	Taulib Ikharo	Sr
WR	18	D.J. St. Julien	Fr
WR	19	Andrew Guillot	Jr
WR	20	Mark Harrington	So
WR	21	Blasher Saintvil	Jr
RB	22	Tyrone Duplessis	So
RB	23	Blake Martin	Fr
RB	26	Tevin King	Fr
RB	32	Ray Holley	Sr
RB	36	Hunter Lee	Fr
RB	38	Malon Lee	Jr
RB	46	Rickey Courtney	So
WR	49	Noah Cheshier	Fr
OL	57	Kevin Saia	Jr
OL	61	Matthew Conger	Jr
OL	63	Stephen Warner	Jr
OL	64	Johnny Ginart	Fr
OL	65	Houston Lantrip	Jr
OL	66	Matthew Shepherd	So
OL	67	Oscar Johnson	Jr
OL	68	Josh Robinson	Fr
OL	69	Vincent Cano	So
OL	72	Jeremy Graffree	Jr
OL	73	Josh Parrish	Jr
OL	74	Larry Banks	Jr
OL	76	Zeke Alsander	Fr
OL	78	Jordan Mills	Jr
OL	79	Kris Cavitt	Sr
WR	81	Scott Cathcart	Jr
WR	83	Matthew Manning	Fr
WR	85	David Gru	Jr
WR	87	D.J. Banks	So
WR	89	Chandler Spence	Jr

Defense

Pos.	#	Name	Class
LB	6	Beau Fitte	Fr
CB	11	DeMarcion Evans	Sr
CB	15	Brice Abraham	Fr
DB	17	Craig Johnson	Jr
DB	20	Jamel Johnson	Jr
DB	23	Ryan Williams	Sr
CB	24	Dave Clark	Jr
DB	25	Justin Goodman	Sr
CB	27	Quinn Giles	Jr
CB	28	Terry Carter	Sr
DB	29	Kendall Hayes	Fr
LB	30	Harrison Lewis	Fr
DB/S	31	Chad Boyd	Jr
S	34	Mike Schrang	Fr
DB	35	Kelvin Scott	So
DB	37	Vincent Moore	Fr
S	38	Connor Nichols	Fr
LB	39	Warren Bates	Fr
LB	40	Kevin Kisseberth	Fr
DL	41	I.K. Enemkpali	So
DL	42	Kendrick James	So
LB	43	Chip Hester	Jr
LB	44	Adrien Cole	Sr
LB	45	Jay Dudley	Sr
LB	46	Rufus Porter	So
S	47	Javontay Crowe	Jr
LB	48	Dusty Rust	Sr
LB	50	Ches Morrison	Fr
LB	52	Ty Hook	Fr
DL	53	Adam Hymel	Sr
DE	54	Shakeil Lucas	So
LB	55	Antonio Mitchum	Jr
LB	56	Solomon Randle	Jr
LB	58	Zachary Voss	So
DL	70	Justin Ellis	So
DT	75	Philip Longino	Jr
DE	80	Eric Harper	Sr
DL	84	Andre Taylor	Fr
DL	88	Tyler Porter	Fr
DL	90	Dirk Tanner	Fr
DE	91	Matt Broha	Sr
DL	92	Carter Street	Fr
DE	93	Christian Lacey	Sr
DL	95	Jon'al White	Jr
DT	96	Brandon Patterson	Sr
DL	98	Vontarrius Dora	Fr
DL	99	Malcolm Pichon	Fr

Special teams

Pos.	#	Name	Class
PK	10	John Hinton	Jr
ATH	13	Levander Liggins	Fr
PK	33	Matt Nelson	Jr
LS	51	Josh Cuthbert	So
LS	82	Cody Stidham	Fr
P	86	Ryan Allen	Jr

Head coach

- Sonny Dykes

Coordinators/assistant coaches

- Tony Franklin (offensive coordinator / quarterbacks)
- Tommy Spangler (defensive coordinator / safeties)
- Rob Likens (assistant head coach / wide receivers)
- Stan Eggen (defensive line / recruiting coordinator)
- Pierre Ingram (running backs)
- Jeff Koonz (linebackers)
- Kevin Curtis (cornerbacks)
- Petey Perot (offensive line)
- Mark Tommerdahl (special teams / inside receivers)
- Damon Harrington (head strength and conditioning)
- Ed Jackson (Character education coordinator /
  assistant strength and conditioning)
- Jacob Peeler (strength and conditioning intern)
- Zach Yenser (offensive graduate assistant)
- Thomas Graham (defensive graduate assistant)
- Hunter McWilliams (director of football operations)
- David Snyder (director of video operations)

Legend

- (C) Team captain
- (S) Suspended
- (I) Ineligible
- Injured
- Redshirt

Roster
Last update: September 3, 2011

== Game summaries ==
=== Southern Miss ===
Rivalry in Dixie

Team	1	2	3	4	Total
LA Tech	0	0	10	7	17
• USM	7	0	3	9	19

- Date: September 3
- Location: M. M. Roberts Stadium, Hattiesburg, Mississippi
- Game start: 9:10 p.m.
- Elapsed time: 3:35
- Game attendance: 22,356
- Game weather: 74 °F (23 °C), cloudy with heavy rain, winds E 17 mph (27 km/h)
- Referee: Robert Cameron
- TV announcers (Fox Sports Net): Ron Thulin (play-by-play), J.C. Pearson (analyst), Jeremy Bloom (sideline)

The Bulldogs opened the 2011 football season on the road against the Southern Mississippi Golden Eagles of Conference USA. The game was the second in a scheduled 4-game football series between the two universities from 2010 to 2014. Southern Miss defeated Louisiana Tech 19–17 in a game that was played during periods of heavy rain and high winds due to Tropical Storm Lee.

Southern Miss scored the game's first touchdown at 11:38 in the first quarter to take a 7–0 lead. After neither team scored the rest of the first half, both teams hit field goals to make the score Southern Miss 10, Louisiana Tech 3 with 14 seconds left in the third quarter. Louisiana Tech tied the game at 10–10 when Lyle Fitte ran back a kickoff return 86 yards for a touchdown as the third quarter ended. After USM scored a field goal with 11:42 left in the contest to take a 13–10 lead, Louisiana Tech recovered a fumbled punt by Southern Miss at the USM 3-yard line. Lennon Creer scored Tech's sole offensive touchdown of the night on a 1-yard carry to give Tech a 17–13 lead with 9:43 left in the game. Southern Miss took a 19–17 lead after hitting field goals of 42 yards and 49 yards. Southern Miss went on to win the game after time expired with Louisiana Tech's offense in Southern Miss territory.

Louisiana Tech's offense had 244 total yards in the game with Lennon Creer running 17 times for 53 yards and 1 touchdown. True freshman Nick Isham went completed 20 passes on 36 attempts for 176 yards and kicked two punts for 77 yards in his first collegiate football start. Tech's defense held Southern Miss to 379 total yards and allowed one touchdown and four field goals in the contest. Tech's special teams personnel blocked a field goal in the first quarter, scored a kickoff return TD in the third quarter, and recovered a fumbled punt by USM in the fourth quarter.

Scoring summary

Quarter	Time	Drive			Team	Scoring information	Score	
Quarter	Time	Plays	Yards	TOP	Team	Scoring information	LA Tech	USM
1	11:38	7	72	3:22	USM	Kelvin Bolden 12-yard touchdown run, Danny Hrapmann kick good	0	7
3	4:39	8	58	3:10	LA Tech	28-yard field goal by Matt Nelson	3	7
3	0:14	9	43	4:18	USM	38-yard field goal by Danny Hrapmann	3	10
3	0:00				LA Tech	Kickoff returned 86 yards for touchdown by Lyle Fitte, Matt Nelson kick good	10	10
4	11:42	9	73	3:18	USM	25-yard field goal by Corey Acosta	10	13
4	9:43	2	3	0:41	LA Tech	Lennon Creer 1-yard touchdown run, Matt Nelson kick good	17	13
4	7:44	6	43	1:54	USM	42-yard field goal by Corey Acosta	17	16
4	2:32	11	56	3:27	USM	49-yard field goal by Danny Hrapmann	17	19
"TOP" = time of possession. For other American football terms, see Glossary of American football.							17	19

=== Central Arkansas ===
Team	1	2	3	4	OT	Total
UCA	10	7	10	15	0	42
• LA Tech	14	7	14	7	6	48

- Date: September 10
- Location: Joe Aillet Stadium, Ruston, Louisiana
- Game start: 6:04 p.m.
- Elapsed time: 3:36
- Game attendance: 20,652
- Game weather: 85 °F (29 °C), clear skies, winds N 5–10 mph (8.0–16.1 km/h)
- Referee: Stacy Hardin
- TV announcers (ESPN3): John Sadak (play-by-play), John Gregory (analyst)

Louisiana Tech opened their home schedule at Joe Aillet Stadium by hosting the University of Central Arkansas Bears for the third meeting between the two schools and the first since 2007. The Louisiana Tech Bulldogs defeated the UCA Bears 48–42 in overtime. Louisiana Tech took an early 7–0 lead after a 42-yard touchdown pass from Nick Isham to Quinton Patton. After UCA kicked a 39-yard field goal to cut the lead to 7–3, Isham completed a 72-yard touchdown pass to Patton to extend the Louisiana Tech to 14–3 over Central Arkansas. Near the end of the first quarter, UCA quarterback Nathan Dick completed a 17-yard touchdown pass to Jessie Grandy to cut the Tech lead to 14–10. In the second quarter, Tech running back Lennon Creer ran for a 5-yard touchdown and UCA's Dominiqu Croom caught a 3-yard touchdown from Nathan Dick to make the halftime score Louisiana Tech 21, Central Arkansas 17.

The third quarter started with a 35-yard field goal by UCA to cut the lead to 21–20 Louisiana Tech. Tech answered with a 4-yard touchdown run by Ray Holley and a 12-yard touchdown run by Lennon Creer to extend Tech's lead to 35–20 with 4:55 left in the third quarter. Nathan Dick threw two touchdown passes of 43 and 56 yards respectively and connected on a two-point conversion attempt to tie the ball game at 35–35 with 14:10 left in the fourth quarter. With 2:08 left in the game, Jerrel McKnight recovered a fumble by Lennon Creer and ran 73 yards for a touchdown to give Central Arkansas its first lead of the night, 42–35. Ray Holley scored his second rushing touchdown in the game on a seven-yard carry to cap a seven-play, 72-yard drive in 1 minute, 10 seconds to tie the contest at 42–42.

The game went into overtime after the fourth quarter ended with the game tied at 42–42. UCA received the ball first in the overtime period and had a 39-yard field goal blocked by Adrian Cole. Louisiana Tech went on to score on a 1-yard touchdown run by Lennon Creer to give Louisiana Tech a 48–42 victory over Central Arkansas in the first overtime game for Louisiana Tech since their September 8, 2007 home game against the Hawaii Warriors.

Nick Isham completed 22 of 37 passes for 318 yards, 2 touchdowns, and 1 interception. Lennon Creer had 32 carries for 183 yards and 3 touchdowns while Ray Holley ran the ball 9 times for 49 yards and 2 touchdowns. Wide receiver Quinton Patton caught 8 passes for 211 yards and two touchdowns. Patton's 211 yard performance is tied for 10th place for the most receiving yards in a single game by a Louisiana Tech player.

Scoring summary

Quarter	Time	Drive			Team	Scoring information	Score	
Quarter	Time	Plays	Yards	TOP	Team	Scoring information	UCA	LA Tech
1	10:10	5	57	1:21	LA Tech	Quinton Patton 42-yard touchdown reception from Nick Isham, Matt Nelson kick good	0	7
1	4:46	11	58	5:24	UCA	39-yard field goal by Eddie Camara	3	7
1	4:31	1	72	0:15	LA Tech	Quinton Patton 72-yard touchdown reception from Nick Isham, Matt Nelson kick good	3	14
1	0:18	9	79	4:13	UCA	Jesse Grandy 17-yard touchdown reception from Nathan Dick, Eddie Camara kick good	10	14
2	5:17	5	35	1:40	LA Tech	Lennon Creer 5-yard touchdown run, Matt Nelson kick good	10	21
2	0:39	3	20	1:11	UCA	Dominique Croom 3-yard touchdown reception from Nathan Dick, Eddie Camara kick good	17	21
3	11:11	10	54	3:49	UCA	35-yard field goal by Eddie Camara	20	21
3	9:16	7	46	1:55	LA Tech	Ray Holley 4-yard touchdown run, Matt Nelson kick good	20	28
3	4:55	7	74	2:08	LA Tech	Lennon Creer 12-yard touchdown run, Matt Nelson kick good	20	35
3	2:59	6	77	1:56	UCA	Dominique Croom 43-yard touchdown reception from Nathan Dick, Eddie Camara kick good	27	35
4	14:10	3	80	0:39	UCA	Jesse Grandy 56-yard touchdown reception from Nathan Dick, 2-point pass good	35	35
4	2:08				UCA	Fumble recovery returned 73 yards for touchdown by Jerrel McKnight, Eddie Camara kick good	42	35
4	0:58	7	72	1:10	LA Tech	Ray Holley 7-yard touchdown run, Matt Nelson kick good	42	42
OT		3	25		LA Tech	Lennon Creer 1-yard touchdown run	42	48
"TOP" = time of possession. For other American football terms, see Glossary of American football.							42	48

=== Houston ===
Team	1	2	3	4	Total
• Houston	0	7	7	21	35
LA Tech	7	13	14	0	34

- Date: September 17
- Location: Joe Aillet Stadium, Ruston, Louisiana
- Game start: 6:04 p.m.
- Elapsed time: 3:21
- Game attendance: 24,628
- Game weather: 78 °F (26 °C), clear skies, calm winds
- Referee: Ken Antee
- TV announcers (ESPN3): John Sadak (play-by-play), Rene Nadeau (analyst)

Louisiana Tech hosted the Houston Cougars in their second home game of the 2011 football season. The matchup between Louisiana Tech and the University of Houston is the first game in a scheduled four-game football series that will run from 2011 to 2014. The Houston Cougars defeated the Louisiana Tech Bulldogs 35–34 after Houston scored 28 unanswered points to complete the biggest comeback in their program's history.

Louisiana Tech took a 7–0 lead after Lennon Creer scored a 1-yard rushing touchdown with 11:12 left in the first quarter. Tech extended their lead over Houston to 10–0 after Matt Nelson kicked a 30-yard field goal with 10:10 left in the second quarter. Houston scored its first points of the night with 7:21 left in the second quarter when Case Keenum connected with Michael Hayes for a 54-yard touchdown to cut Louisiana Tech's lead to 10–7. Louisiana Tech answered with a 2-yard touchdown run by Ray Holley and a 47-yard field goal by Nelson to take the 20–7 lead at halftime.

Both teams traded punts to open the third quarter. With 6:47 left in the third quarter, Louisiana Tech QB Nick Isham completed a 16-yard touchdown pass to Quinton Patton to increase Tech's lead to 27–7. After Quinn Giles intercepted a pass by Case Keenum, Ray Holley scored his second rushing touchdown in the game on a 7-yard TD run to bring the Louisiana Tech lead to 34–7 with 5:11 left in the third quarter. Houston began their comeback when Keenum completed a 50-yard touchdown pass with 4:27 left in the third quarter to make the score Louisiana Tech 34, Houston 14. Bryce Beall ran for a 2-yard touchdown to cut the Tech lead to 34–21 with 12:53 left in the fourth quarter. After Houston recovered a fumble by Tech's Ray Holley, Houston completed an 80-yard drive down the field with a 4-yard touchdown run by Beall to make the score 34–28 Louisiana Tech with 7:25 remaining in the game. Houston took its first lead of the night after Keenum threw a 32-yard touchdown pass to make the score Houston 35–34 with 1:36 remaining in the game. Houston went on to win the game after Tech turned the ball over on downs in the last minute of the game.

Louisiana Tech generated 444 yards on offense on 98 plays. Lennon Creer and Ray Holley combined for 47 carries, 161 yards, and three touchdowns on the ground, as Louisiana Tech ran 66 rushing plays in the game which is tied for the 2nd-most carries by a Bulldog team in the history of the program. Quinton Patton caught five passes for 82 yards and one touchdown for the evening and was later named to the Fred Biletnikoff Award Watch List after the game as a result of his play through the first three games of the 2011 college football season. The crowd of 24,628 at Joe Aillet Stadium for the Louisiana Tech vs. Houston marked the sixth-largest crowd for a Louisiana Tech football game at Joe Aillet Stadium.

Scoring summary

Quarter	Time	Drive			Team	Scoring information	Score	
Quarter	Time	Plays	Yards	TOP	Team	Scoring information	Houston	LA Tech
1	11:12	4	8	1:17	LA Tech	Lennon Creer 1-yard touchdown run, Matt Nelson kick good	0	7
2	10:10	15	57	4:43	LA Tech	30-yard field goal by Matt Nelson	0	10
2	7:21	8	74	2:49	Houston	Michael Hayes 54-yard touchdown reception from Case Keenum, Matt Hogan kick good	7	10
2	4:02	11	77	3:19	LA Tech	Ray Holley 2-yard touchdown run, Matt Nelson kick good	7	17
2	0:02	9	49	2:14	LA Tech	47-yard field goal by Matt Nelson	7	20
3	6:47	12	64	4:28	LA Tech	Quinton Patton 16-yard touchdown reception from Nick Isham, Matt Nelson kick good	7	27
3	5:11	5	43	1:23	LA Tech	Ray Holley 7-yard touchdown run, Matt Nelson kick good	7	34
3	4:27	3	80	0:44	Houston	Patrick Edwards 50-yard touchdown reception from Case Keenum, Matt Hogan kick good	14	34
4	12:53	9	64	3:17	Houston	Bryce Beall 2-yard touchdown run, Matt Hogan kick good	21	34
4	7:25	9	80	2:48	Houston	Bryce Beall 4-yard touchdown run, Matt Hogan kick good	28	34
4	1:36	6	84	1:10	Houston	Patrick Edwards 32-yard touchdown reception from Case Keenum, Matt Hogan kick good	35	34
"TOP" = time of possession. For other American football terms, see Glossary of American football.							35	34

=== Mississippi State ===
Team	1	2	3	4	OT	Total
LA Tech	3	7	7	3	0	20
• Miss St	7	10	3	0	6	26

- Date: September 24
- Location: Davis Wade Stadium, Starkville, Mississippi
- Game start: 6:06 p.m.
- Elapsed time: 3:15
- Game attendance: 55,116
- Game weather: 79 °F (26 °C), fair skies, winds SSW at 5 mph (8.0 km/h)
- Referee: Tom Ritter
- Television network: ESPNU

Louisiana Tech traveled to Starkville, Mississippi to play the Mississippi State Bulldogs in their second road game of the 2011 football season. This meeting marked the first meeting between the two schools since the 2008 season opener at Ruston and only the second meeting since 1996. The Mississippi State Bulldogs defeated Louisiana Tech 26–20 in overtime.

Mississippi State took a 7–0 lead after Chad Bumphis returned a punt 82 yards for a touchdown with 9:20 left in the first quarter. Louisiana Tech cut the lead to 7–3 after Matt Nelson made a 43-yard field goal with 5:49 left in the first quarter. At the 14:17 mark in the second quarter, Louisiana Tech took a 10–7 lead when Lennon Creer scored a 4-yard rushing touchdown to cap off an 11-play, 80-yard drive. Mississippi State retook the lead after Vick Ballard scored an 11-yard rushing touchdown with 8:45 remaining in the second quarter to make the score 14–10 Mississippi State. Mississippi State added a field goal to take a 17–10 lead going into halftime.

After both teams traded punts to open the second half, Louisiana Tech tied the game at 17–17 after QB Nick Isham completed a 14-yard touchdown pass to Quinton Patton with 8:25 left in the third quarter. Mississippi State regained the lead after Depasquale hit a 24-yard field goal to take a 20–17 lead with 5:21 left in the third quarter. With 8:42 left in the game, Louisiana Tech tied the game 20–20 when Matt Nelson hit his second field goal of the game. The score of the game remained tied at 20–20 when the fourth quarter ended. Overtime began with Louisiana Tech on offense. Tech's drive ended with no points scored after Nick Isham threw an interception to Mississippi State's Nickoe Whitley. Mississippi State won the game 26–20 on its offensive possession in overtime after Chris Relf threw a 17-yard touchdown pass.

The Mississippi State game marked the second overtime game for the Louisiana Tech Bulldogs for the 2011 football season. This is also the second time in program history that Louisiana Tech has played two overtime games in one season. The six-point loss to Mississippi State was the third close loss of the year for Louisiana Tech, as their first three losses of the 2011 season were by a combined nine points.

Scoring summary

Quarter	Time	Drive			Team	Scoring information	Score	
Quarter	Time	Plays	Yards	TOP	Team	Scoring information	LA Tech	MSU
1	9:20				MSU	Punt returned 82 yards for touchdown by Chad Bumphis, Derek DePasquale kick good	0	7
1	5:49	9	48	3:25	LA Tech	43-yard field goal by Matt Nelson	3	7
2	14:17	11	80	3:32	LA Tech	Lennon Creer 4-yard touchdown run, Matt Nelson kick good	10	7
2	8:45	7	61	2:34	MSU	Vick Ballard 11-yard touchdown run, Derek DePasquale kick good	10	14
2	1:38	9	71	3:02	MSU	36-yard field goal by Derek DePasquale	10	17
3	8:25	6	34	1:54	LA Tech	Quinton Patton 14-yard touchdown reception from Nick Isham, Matt Nelson kick good	17	17
3	5:21	5	14	1:30	MSU	24-yard field goal by Derek DePasquale	17	20
4	8:42	11	46	5:37	LA Tech	28-yard field goal by Matt Nelson	20	20
OT		2	25		MSU	LaDarius Perkins 14-yard touchdown reception from Chris Relf	20	26
"TOP" = time of possession. For other American football terms, see Glossary of American football.							20	26

=== Hawaii ===
Team	1	2	3	4	Total
• Hawaii	13	7	24	0	44
LA Tech	6	0	14	6	26

- Date: October 1
- Location: Joe Aillet Stadium, Ruston, Louisiana
- Game start: 6:07 p.m.
- Elapsed time: 3:33
- Game attendance: 25,212
- Game weather: 75 °F (24 °C), clear skies
- Referee: Robert Cameron
- TV announcers (ESPN3): Trey Bender (play-by-play), Jay Taylor (analyst)

Louisiana Tech hosted the Hawaii Warriors in their third home game and the first WAC conference game of the 2011 football season. This meeting marked the final game between the two schools as members of the Western Athletic Conference, since Hawaii will leave the WAC and join the Mountain West Conference after the end of the 2011–2012 season. The Hawaii Warriors defeated Louisiana Tech 44–26 before a crowd of 25,212, the fourth largest crowd in the history of a Tech football game at Joe Aillet Stadium.

Louisiana Tech took a 6–0 lead over Hawaii after Nick Isham completed a two-yard touchdown pass to Quinton Patton with 8:40 left in the first quarter. Hawaii responded with three touchdown passes by Bryant Moniz to Royce Pollard in the remainder of the first half to take a 21–6 lead over Louisiana Tech at halftime.

Louisiana Tech cut Hawaii's lead to 20–13 when Nick Isham connected with Taulib Ikharo on a 7-yard touchdown pass with 13:37 left in the third quarter. With 9:29 left in the third quarter, Bryant Moniz threw a 6-yard touchdown pass to Craig Stutzmann to extend Hawaii's lead to 27–13. Hawaii's defense scored 14 points off a 49-yard interception return and a 16-yard fumble recovery to increase Hawaii's lead to 41–13 with 7:46 left in the third quarter. Lennon Creer ran for a 10-yard touchdown to cut the Hawaii lead to 41–20 with 6:40 left in the third quarter. Hawaii added a field goal at the 3:01 mark in the third quarter in take a 44–20 lead. Nick Isham ran for a 4-yard touchdown to make the game score Hawaii 44–26 at the 7:55 mark in the fourth quarter. Louisiana Tech went on to lose the game to Hawaii by a score of 44–26.

Louisiana Tech's 2011 record fell to 1–4 overall and 0–1 in the WAC while Hawaii improved its record to 3–2 overall and 1–0 in the WAC.

Scoring summary

Quarter	Time	Drive			Team	Scoring information	Score	
Quarter	Time	Plays	Yards	TOP	Team	Scoring information	Hawaii	LA Tech
1	8:40	13	80	4:36	LA Tech	Quinton Patton 2-yard touchdown reception from Nick Isham, Matt Nelson kick no good (blocked)	0	6
1	6:43	4	83	1:57	Hawaii	Royce Pollard 27-yard touchdown reception from Bryant Moniz, Tyler Hadden kick no good	6	6
1	1:18	2	66	0:24	Hawaii	Royce Pollard 13-yard touchdown reception from Bryant Moniz, Tyler Hadden kick good	13	6
2	6:25	12	88	5:16	Hawaii	Royce Pollard 9-yard touchdown reception from Bryant Moniz, Tyler Hadden kick good	20	6
3	13:37	3	47	1:04	LA Tech	Taulib Ikharo 7-yard touchdown reception from Nick Isham, Matt Nelson kick good	20	13
3	9:29	10	65	4:08	Hawaii	Bill Ray Stutzmann 6-yard touchdown reception from Bryant Moniz, Tyler Hadden kick good	27	13
3	7:50				Hawaii	Interception returned 49 yards for touchdown by Richard Torres, Tyler Hadden kick good	34	13
3	7:46				Hawaii	Fumble recovery returned 16 yards for touchdown by Tank Hopkins, Tyler Hadden kick good	41	13
3	6:40	3	52	1:06	LA Tech	Lennon Creer 10-yard touchdown reception from Nick Isham, Matt Nelson kick good	41	20
3	3:01	7	35	3:39	Hawaii	30-yard field goal by Tyler Hadden	44	20
4	7:55	12	76	2:48	LA Tech	Nick Isham 4-yard touchdown run, 2-point pass failed	44	26
"TOP" = time of possession. For other American football terms, see Glossary of American football.							44	26

=== Idaho ===
Team	1	2	3	4	Total
• LA Tech	0	10	14	0	24
Idaho	0	5	0	6	11

- Date: October 8
- Location: Kibbie Dome, Moscow, Idaho
- Game start: 2:07 pm
- Elapsed time: 3:30
- Game attendance: 15,309
- Game weather: indoors
- Referee: Clair Gausman

Louisiana Tech traveled to Moscow, Idaho to face the Idaho Vandals in their second conference game of the year. The Bulldogs defeated the Idaho Vandals 24–11 to end their three-game losing streak.

After a scoreless first quarter, Louisiana Tech took a 3–0 lead in the game after Matt Nelson kicked a 23-yard field goal with 14:56 left in the second quarter. Tech's lead was cut to 3–2 after Idaho scored a safety when Andre Ferguson tackled Louisiana Tech's Lennon Creer in Tech's endzone at the 12:27 mark in the second quarter. Louisiana Tech increased the lead to 10–2 after Jay Dudley intercepted a pass by Idaho's Brain Reader and completed a 53-yard return for a touchdown with 4:47 left in the second quarter. Idaho scored on a 43-yard field goal with 2:57 left in the second quarter to make the score Louisiana Tech 10–5. Louisiana Tech scored fourteen points in the third quarter as a result of a 6-yard touchdown pass to David Gru and a 1-yard touchdown run by Nick Isham to increase their lead to 24–5. Idaho's Justin Veltung returned a punt by Tech's Ryan Allen for an 81-yard touchdown with 3:35 left in the fourth quarter to make the final score 24–11 Louisiana Tech.

Hunter Lee received a majority of the carries for Louisiana Tech in place of Lennon Creer and rushed 28 times for 134 yards. Nick Isham was 25/39 for 163 yards and 2 touchdowns (1 rushing, 1 passing). Ryan Allen was named the WAC Special Teams Player of the Week for his punting performance against Idaho. He punted the ball ten times for an average for 48 yards, including 6 downed balls inside the opponent's 20-yard line.

Scoring summary

Quarter	Time	Drive			Team	Scoring information	Score	
Quarter	Time	Plays	Yards	TOP	Team	Scoring information	LA Tech	Idaho
2	14:56	16	75	5:33	LA Tech	23-yard field goal by Matt Nelson	3	0
2	12:27				Idaho	Lennon Creer tackled in end zone for a safety by Andre Ferguson	3	2
2	4:47				LA Tech	Interception returned 53 yards for touchdown by Jay Dudley, Matt Nelson kick good	10	2
2	2:57	7	54	1:50	Idaho	43-yard field goal by Trey Farquhar	10	5
3	6:19	7	53	1:39	LA Tech	David Gru 6-yard touchdown reception from Nick Isham, Matt Nelson kick good	17	5
3	0:05	6	40	2:02	LA Tech	Nick Isham 1-yard touchdown run, Matt Nelson kick good	24	5
4	3:35				Idaho	Punt returned 81 yards for touchdown by Justin Veltung, 2-point pass failed	24	11
"TOP" = time of possession. For other American football terms, see Glossary of American football.							24	11

=== Utah State ===
Team	1	2	3	4	Total
• LA Tech	7	0	7	10	24
Utah St	7	3	7	0	17

- Date: October 22
- Location: Romney Stadium, Logan, Utah
- Game start: 1:05 pm
- Elapsed time: 3:04
- Game attendance: 16,037
- Game weather: 64 °F (18 °C), clear skies
- Referee: Jim Farmer
- TV announcers (ESPN3): Trey Bender (play-by-play), Jay Taylor (analyst)

After a bye week after the Idaho game, Louisiana Tech played Utah State at Logan, Utah. Louisiana Tech's 24–17 victory over Utah State marked their second straight victory this season and the first time that Louisiana Tech has won four consecutive WAC road games since joining the conference in 2001. The game also featured a quarterback change for Louisiana Tech when Colby Cameron substituted for Nick Isham late in the third quarter.

Louisiana Tech took the first lead of the game after Lennon Creer ran for a 3-yard touchdown to make the score Louisiana Tech 7–0 at the 8:22 mark in the first quarter. Utah State responded with a 1-yard touchdown run by Robert Turpin to tie the game at 7–7 with 3:20 left in the first quarter. Utah State took a 10–7 lead after Josh Thompson hit a 43-yard field goal with 7:57 left in the second quarter. Louisiana Tech retook the lead from Utah State with 11:36 left in the third quarter after Terry Carter intercepted a pass by Chuckie Keeton and returned it 22 yards for a touchdown to make the score 14–10 for Louisiana Tech. Utah State captured the lead again after Chuckie Keeton scored on a 29-yard touchdown run with 7:41 left in the third quarter to make the score 17–14 Utah State. The Bulldogs took a 21–17 lead after Hunter Lee scored an 8-yard touchdown run with 10:14 left in the fourth quarter. Matt Nelson connected on a 24-yard field goal with 2:46 left in the game to make the final score 24–17 Louisiana Tech.

Colby Cameron came into the game for Louisiana Tech late in the third quarter after Nick Isham struggled for most of the game at quarterback. This was the first game in which Cameron completed a pass since September 18, 2010 against Navy. Adrian Cole was named the WAC Defensive Player of the Week, and Ryan Allen was named the WAC Special Teams Player of the Week for their performances against Utah State.

Scoring summary

Quarter	Time	Drive			Team	Scoring information	Score	
Quarter	Time	Plays	Yards	TOP	Team	Scoring information	LA Tech	Utah St
1	8:22	10	87	4:25	LA Tech	Lennon Creer 3-yard touchdown run, Matt Nelson kick good	7	0
1	3:20	12	80	5:02	Utah St	Robert Turbin 1-yard touchdown run, Josh Thompson kick good	7	7
2	7:57	10	29	3:59	Utah St	43-yard field goal by Josh Thompson	7	10
3	11:36				LA Tech	Interception returned 22 yards for touchdown by Terry Carter, Matt Nelson kick good	14	10
3	7:41	9	87	3:50	Utah St	Chuckie Keeton 29-yard touchdown run, Josh Thompson kick good	14	17
4	10:14	8	58	2:52	LA Tech	Hunter Lee 8-yard touchdown run, Matt Nelson kick good	21	17
4	2:46	4	4	1:44	LA Tech	24-yard field goal by Matt Nelson	24	17
"TOP" = time of possession. For other American football terms, see Glossary of American football.							24	17

=== San Jose State ===
Team	1	2	3	4	Total
SJSU	7	7	8	6	28
• LA Tech	3	21	14	0	38

- Date: October 29
- Location: Joe Aillet Stadium, Ruston, Louisiana
- Game start: 3:07 pm
- Elapsed time: 3:20
- Game attendance: 19,642
- Game weather: 78 °F (26 °C), clear skies
- Referee: Stacy Hardin

Louisiana Tech hosted the San Jose State Spartans at Joe Aillet Stadium in Ruston, Louisiana for their annual Homecoming game. Louisiana Tech defeated the Spartans 38–38 to win their third consecutive game this season and improved their record to 4–4 (3–1 in conference play) for the 2011 season. Colby Cameron started at quarterback for Louisiana Tech in place of the injured Nick Isham.

Louisiana Tech took the first lead with 8:59 left in the third quarter when Matt Nelson hit a 25-yard field goal to make the score 3–0. San Jose State took a 7–3 lead at the 6:50 mark in the first quarter when Brandon Rutley ran for a 1-yard touchdown. Louisiana Tech retook the lead at the 10:31 mark in the second quarter when Richie Casey ran for a 21-yard touchdown to make the score 10–7 in favor of the Bulldogs. With 8:29 remaining in the second quarter, San Jose State took a 14–10 lead after Matt Faulkner threw a 60-yard touchdown to Noel Grigsby. Louisiana Tech took a 17–14 lead at the 7:20 mark in the second quarter after Colby Cameron threw a 90-yard touchdown pass to Quinton Patton. Tech scored another touchdown on a 2-yard pass from Cameron to Quinton Patton to extend the lead to 24–14 going into the half.

The Bulldogs started the second half with a 1-yard touchdown run by Lennon Creer to take a 31–14 lead with 11:15 left in the third quarter. Jay Dudley intercepted a pass by Matt Faulkner and returned it for a 36-yard touchdown to make the score 38–14 for Louisiana Tech. Dudley's interception return for a touchdown marked the second INT return for a touchdown in the last three games. San Jose State scored a touchdown and a two-point conversion with 43 seconds left in the third quarter to trim Louisiana Tech's lead to 38–22. San Jose State would score another touchdown with a 20-yard touchdown reception to Ryan Otten to make the final score Louisiana Tech 38–28.

In his first start in 2011, Colby Cameron was 17/27 for 237 yards, and 2 touchdowns. Lennon Creer ran the ball 31 times for 112 yards, and 1 touchdown. Quinton Patton had 5 receptions for 116 yards and 2 touchdowns. The 90-yard touchdown pass from Cameron to Patton was the fifth-longest reception in Louisiana Tech history and the longest touchdown of the 2011 season for Louisiana Tech. Tech's defense held San Jose State to a season-low 12 yards rushing and forced five turnovers, including four interceptions.

Scoring summary

Quarter	Time	Drive			Team	Scoring information	Score	
Quarter	Time	Plays	Yards	TOP	Team	Scoring information	SJSU	LA Tech
1	8:59	5	14	1:04	LA Tech	25-yard field goal by Matt Nelson	0	3
1	6:50	1	1	0:04	SJSU	Brandon Rutley 1-yard touchdown run, Jens Alvernik kick good	7	3
2	10:31	10	94	3:35	LA Tech	Richie Casey 21-yard touchdown run, Matt Nelson kick good	7	10
2	8:29	4	76	2:02	SJSU	Noel Grigsby 60-yard touchdown reception from Matt Faulkner, Jens Alvernik kick good	14	10
2	7:20	4	93	1:09	LA Tech	Quinton Patton 90-yard touchdown reception from Colby Cameron, Matt Nelson kick good	14	17
2	0:18	3	13	0:33	LA Tech	Quinton Patton 2-yard touchdown reception from Colby Cameron, Matt Nelson kick good	14	24
3	11:15	12	60	3:45	LA Tech	Lennon Creer 1-yard touchdown run, Matt Nelson kick good	14	31
3	10:55				LA Tech	Interception returned 36 yards for touchdown by Jay Dudley, Matt Nelson kick good	14	38
3	0:43	5	49	1:40	SJSU	Chandler Jones 5-yard touchdown reception from Matt Faulkner, 2-point pass good	22	38
4	3:18	11	99	2:37	SJSU	Ryan Otten 20-yard touchdown reception from Matt Faulkner, 2-point pass failed	28	38
"TOP" = time of possession. For other American football terms, see Glossary of American football.							28	38

=== Fresno State ===
Team	1	2	3	4	Total
• LA Tech	14	20	7	0	41
Fresno St	0	7	7	7	21

- Date: November 5
- Location: Bulldog Stadium, Fresno, California
- Game start: 7:32 p.m.
- Elapsed time: 3:23
- Game attendance: 27,965
- Game weather: 53 °F (12 °C), calm winds, mostly cloudy skies
- Referee: Jim Farmer
- Television network: ESPNU

Louisiana Tech traveled to Fresno, California to face the Fresno State Bulldogs. With Fresno State moving to the Mountain West Conference after the 2011–12 season, this game was probably the final meeting between the two teams for the foreseeable future. Louisiana Tech defeated Fresno State 41–21 to win their fourth consecutive game and improve the season record to 5–4 (4–1 in WAC play).

Louisiana Tech took a 7–0 lead at the 10:01 mark in the first quarter when Colby Cameron threw a 45-yard touchdown pass to Quinton Patton. Tech extended the lead to 14–0 when Cameron threw a 22-yard touchdown pass to Quinton Patton with 4:40 left in the first quarter. Matt Nelson hit a 26-yard field goal to increase LA Tech's lead to 17–0 with 14:19 remaining in the second quarter. Fresno State scored a touchdown on a 6-yard pass from Derek Carr to Victor Dean to cut Louisiana Tech's lead to 17–7 with 9:40 left in the second quarter. Louisiana Tech responded with a 53-yard rushing touchdown by Lennon Creer and a 75-yard touchdown pass from Colby Cameron to Myles White to make the score Louisiana Tech 31–7 with 5:23 left in the second quarter. Matt Nelson hit a 40-yard field goal at the end of the second quarter to make the score Louisiana Tech 34–7.

Louisiana Tech extended their lead to 41–7 at the 10:26 mark in the third quarter after Colby Cameron threw a 6-yard touchdown pass to Richie Casey. Fresno State cut the lead to 41–14 when Derek Carr threw a 16-yard touchdown pass to Jalen Saunders with 7:03 remaining in the third quarter. Fresno State scored one more touchdown at the 6:14 mark in the fourth quarter when Derek Carr threw a 24-yard pass to Devon White to make the final score of the game Louisiana Tech 41, Fresno State 21.

Colby Cameron was named the WAC Offensive Player of the Week after his performance in the Fresno State game. Cameron was 19/33 for 376 yards, four touchdowns, and no interceptions. Lennon Creer had 17 carries for 116 yards and one touchdown. Quinton Patton had 6 receptions for 97 yards and 2 TDs, and Myles White had 2 catches for 130 yards, and 1 TD.

Scoring summary

Quarter	Time	Drive			Team	Scoring information	Score	
Quarter	Time	Plays	Yards	TOP	Team	Scoring information	LA Tech	Fresno St
1	10:01	4	63	1:19	LA Tech	Quinton Patton 45-yard touchdown reception from Colby Cameron, Matt Nelson kick good	7	0
1	4:40	5	58	1:28	LA Tech	Quinton Patton 22-yard touchdown reception from Colby Cameron, Matt Nelson kick good	14	0
2	14:19	8	60	1:43	LA Tech	26-yard field goal by Matt Nelson	17	0
2	9:40	8	82	4:33	Fresno St	Victor Dean 6-yard touchdown reception from Derek Carr, Kevin Goessling kick good	17	7
2	7:38	6	90	1:50	LA Tech	Lennon Creer 53-yard touchdown run, Matt Nelson kick good	24	7
2	5:23	1	75	0:21	LA Tech	Myles White 75-yard touchdown reception from Colby Cameron, Matt Nelson kick good	31	7
2	0:09	6	26	0:32	LA Tech	40-yard field goal by Matt Nelson	34	7
3	10:26	7	80	2:11	LA Tech	Richie Casey 6-yard touchdown reception from Colby Cameron, Matt Nelson kick good	41	7
3	7:03	9	64	3:17	Fresno St	Jalen Saunders 16-yard touchdown reception from Derek Carr, Kevin Goessling kick good	41	14
4	6:14	16	98	6:40	Fresno St	Devon Wylie 24-yard touchdown reception from Derek Carr, Kevin Goessling kick good	41	21
"TOP" = time of possession. For other American football terms, see Glossary of American football.							41	21

=== Ole Miss ===
Team	1	2	3	4	Total
• LA Tech	0	10	10	7	27
Ole Miss	7	0	0	0	7

- Date: November 12
- Location: Vaught–Hemingway Stadium, Oxford, Mississippi
- Game start: 6:35p.m.
- Elapsed time: 3:11
- Game attendance: 44,123
- Game weather: 59 °F (15 °C), fair, winds S at 3 mph (4.8 km/h)
- Referee: David Smith
- Television network: CSS/CST/ESPN3

Scoring summary

Quarter	Time	Drive			Team	Scoring information	Score	
Quarter	Time	Plays	Yards	TOP	Team	Scoring information	LA Tech	Ole Miss
1	8:53	8	78	3:45	Ole Miss	Brandon Bolden 34-yard touchdown reception from Randall Mackey, Bryson Rose kick good	0	7
2	3:32	4	37	0:54	LA Tech	Taulib Ikharo 21-yard touchdown reception from Colby Cameron, Matt Nelson kick good	7	7
2	0:00	5	70	0:35	LA Tech	43-yard field goal by Matt Nelson	10	7
3	4:38	5	47	1:08	LA Tech	35-yard field goal by Matt Nelson	13	7
3	3:49				LA Tech	Fumble recovery returned 33 yards for touchdown by Chad Boyd, Matt Nelson kick good	20	7
4	11:08				LA Tech	Interception returned 26 yards for touchdown by Javontay Crowe, Matt Nelson kick good	27	7
"TOP" = time of possession. For other American football terms, see Glossary of American football.							27	7

=== Nevada ===
Team	1	2	3	4	Total
• LA Tech	0	0	3	21	24
Nevada	7	0	6	7	20

- Date: November 19
- Location: Mackay Stadium, Reno, Nevada
- Game start: 1:05 p.m.
- Elapsed time: 2:57
- Game attendance: 11,639
- Game weather: 41 °F (5 °C), mostly cloudy, winds 2–5 mph (3.2–8.0 km/h)
- Referee: Bill Athan

Scoring summary

Quarter	Time	Drive			Team	Scoring information	Score	
Quarter	Time	Plays	Yards	TOP	Team	Scoring information	LA Tech	Nevada
1	0:45	10	78	4:35	Nevada	Rishard Matthews 20-yard touchdown reception from Cody Fajardo, Jake Hurst kick good	0	7
3	9:27	12	67	5:27	Nevada	19-yard field goal by Jake Hurst	0	10
3	5:54	12	71	3:27	LA Tech	29-yard field goal by Matt Nelson	3	10
3	3:29	6	59	2:19	Nevada	24-yard field goal by Jake Hurst	3	13
4	13:01	9	49	4:06	Nevada	Stefphon Jefferson 4-yard touchdown run, Jake Hurst kick good	3	20
4	9:11	11	84	3:44	LA Tech	Quinton Patton 9-yard touchdown reception from Colby Cameron, Matt Nelson kick good	10	20
4	5:56	6	89	1:43	LA Tech	Myles White 14-yard touchdown reception from Colby Cameron, Matt Nelson kick good	17	20
4	0:51	7	92	1:38	LA Tech	Taulib Ikharo 8-yard touchdown reception from Colby Cameron, Matt Nelson kick good	24	20
"TOP" = time of possession. For other American football terms, see Glossary of American football.							24	20

=== New Mexico State ===
Team	1	2	3	4	Total
NM State	0	0	0	0	0
• LA Tech	9	14	21	0	44

- Date: November 26
- Location: Joe Aillet Stadium, Ruston, Louisiana
- Game start: 3:00 p.m.
- Elapsed time: 3:13
- Game attendance: 17,458
- Game weather: 68 °F (20 °C), rainy, winds S 5–10 mph (8.0–16.1 km/h)
- Referee: Clair Gausman
- Television network: ESPN+/CST/ALT 2

Scoring summary

Quarter	Time	Drive			Team	Scoring information	Score	
Quarter	Time	Plays	Yards	TOP	Team	Scoring information	NM State	LA Tech
1	9:15	12	77	1:33	LA Tech	32-yard field goal by Matt Nelson	0	3
1	5:24	10	89	2:18	LA Tech	Taulib Ikharo 7-yard touchdown reception from Colby Cameron, Matt Nelson kick failed	0	9
2	0:28	13	96	3:32	LA Tech	Hunter Lee 1-yard touchdown run, Matt Nelson kick good	0	16
2	0:07				LA Tech	Interception returned 45 yards for touchdown by Adrien Cole, Matt Nelson kick good	0	23
3	11:37	9	60	3:23	LA Tech	Hunter Lee 6-yard touchdown run, Matt Nelson kick good	0	30
3	5:19				LA Tech	Punt returned 82 yards for touchdown by Craig Johnson, Matt Nelson kick good	0	37
3	0:13	11	78	3:41	LA Tech	Hunter Lee 7-yard touchdown run, Matt Nelson kick good	0	44
"TOP" = time of possession. For other American football terms, see Glossary of American football.							0	44

=== TCU ===
Poinsettia Bowl

Team	1	2	3	4	Total
• #15 TCU	0	10	7	14	31
LA Tech	3	7	14	0	24

- Date: December 21
- Location: Snapdragon Stadium, San Diego
- Game start: 5:06 p.m.
- Elapsed time: 3:29
- Game attendance: 24,607
- Game weather: 57 °F (14 °C), partly cloudy, winds WSW at 5 mph (8.0 km/h)
- Referee: Todd Geerlings
- TV announcers (ESPN): Joe Tessitore (Play-by-Play), Lou Holtz and Mark May (Analysts), Samantha Steele (Sidelines)

The Louisiana Tech Bulldogs accepted an invitation to the 2011 Poinsettia Bowl after defeating New Mexico State and winning the WAC Championship in their regular season finale on November 25.

Scoring summary

Quarter	Time	Drive			Team	Scoring information	Score	
Quarter	Time	Plays	Yards	TOP	Team	Scoring information	TCU	LA Tech
1	8:30	13	67	3:33	LA Tech	23-yard field goal by Matt Nelson	0	3
2	14:11	8	57	3:22	TCU	25-yard field goal by Ross Evans	3	3
2	11:37	7	59	2:34	LA Tech	Quinton Patton 2-yard touchdown reception from Colby Cameron, Matt Nelson kick good	3	10
2	0:26	4	25	0:55	TCU	Ed Wesley 7-yard touchdown run, Ross Evans kick good	10	10
3	9:54	11	55	5:06	TCU	Matthew Tucker 1-yard touchdown run, Ross Evans kick good	17	10
3	7:18	3	12	0:52	LA Tech	Hunter Lee 2-yard touchdown run, Matt Nelson kick good	17	17
3	2:10	3	61	0:17	LA Tech	Myles White 61-yard touchdown reception from Colby Cameron, Matt Nelson kick good	17	24
4	7:49	18	72	9:21	TCU	Luke Shivers 1-yard touchdown run, Ross Evans kick good	24	24
4	4:26	5	69	1:58	TCU	Skye Dawson 42-yard touchdown reception from Casey Pachall, Ross Evans kick good	31	24
"TOP" = time of possession. For other American football terms, see Glossary of American football.							31	24

== Statistics ==
=== Team ===
	LA Tech	Opp
Scoring	391	301
Points per game	30.1	23.2
First downs	261	262
Rushing	111	106
Passing	133	140
Penalty	17	16
Total offense	5130	4894
Avg per play	5.2	4.9
Avg per game	394.6	376.5
Fumbles-Lost	18–9	18–10
Penalties-Yards	89–796	78–655
Avg per game	61.2	50.4

	LA Tech	Opp
Punts-Yards	85-3908	87-3780
Avg per punt	46.0	43.4
Time of possession/Game	28:22	31:38
3rd down conversions	79/216	68/211
4th down conversions	10/17	11/22
Touchdowns scored	50	37
Field goals-Attempts-Long	15–21	14–21
PAT-Attempts	46–48	31–32
Attendance	107,592	192,545
Games/Avg per Game	5/21,518	7/27,506
Neutral Site Games		1/24,607

==== Scores by quarter ====
	1	2	3	4	OT	Total
LA Tech	66	109	149	61	6	391
Opponents	65	63	82	85	6	301

=== Offense ===
==== Rushing ====
Name	GP-GS	Att	Gain	Loss	Net	Avg	TD	Long	Avg/G
Lennon Creer	10-	198	878	40	838	4.2	9	53	83.8
Hunter Lee	13-	135	671	21	650	4.8	5	48	50.0
Colby Cameron	7-	43	217	37	180	4.2	0	27	25.7
Ray Holley	4-	36	156	12	144	4.0	4	17	36.0
Lyle Fitte	6-	12	81	0	81	6.8	0	15	13.5
Quinton Patton	13-	10	42	0	42	4.2	0	9	3.2
Richie Casey	13-	2	21	3	18	9.0	1	21	1.4
Taulib Ikharo	13-	2	6	1	5	2.5	0	6	0.4
Rickey Courtney	2-	4	7	2	5	1.2	0	4	2.5
Tyrone Duplessis	2-	7	12	15	−3	−0.4	0	7	−1.5
Brock Waters	3-	4	2	10	−8	−2.0	0	2	−2.7
Nick Isham	10-	49	126	145	−19	−0.4	2	13	−1.9
TEAM	7-	7	0	32	−32	−4.6	0	0	−4.6
Total	13-	509	2219	318	1901	3.7	21	53	146.2

==== Passing ====
Name	GP-GS	Effic	Att-Cmp-Int	Pct	Yds	TD	Lng	Avg/G
Nick Isham	10-	112.8	155–257–7	60.3	1457	8	72	145.7
Colby Cameron	7-	137.2	118–215–3	54.9	1667	13	90	238.1
Myles White	10-	59.2	1–2–1	50.0	26	0	26	2.6
Richie Casey	13-	478.0	1–1–0	100.0	45	0	45	3.5
Ray Holley	4-	125.2	1–1–0	100.0	3	0	3	0.8
Brock Waters	3-	259.6	1–1–0	100.0	19	0	19	6.3
Taylor Burch	12-	200.8	1–1–0	100.0	12	0	12	1.0
Total	13-	124.8	278–478–11	58.2	3229	21	90	248.4

==== Receiving ====
Name	GP-GS	No.	Yds	Avg	TD	Long	Avg/G
Quinton Patton	13-	79	1202	15.2	11	90	92.5
Taulib Ikharo	13-	54	537	9.9	4	35	41.3
Myles White	10-	30	414	13.8	3	75	41.4
David Gru	13-	26	339	13.0	1	45	26.1
Richie Casey	13-	19	213	11.2	1	26	16.4
Lennon Creer	10-	18	93	5.2	1	13	9.3
Hunter Lee	13-	13	126	9.7	0	28	9.7
Andrew Guillot	8-	12	118	9.8	0	33	14.8
Lyle Fitte	6-	12	60	5.0	0	9	10.0
Jacarri Jackson	11-	6	62	10.3	0	25	5.6
Ray Holley	4-	4	29	7.2	0	10	7.2
Nick Isham	10-	2	13	6.5	0	8	1.3
Malon Lee	8-	2	11	5.5	0	7	1.4
Matt Broha	13-	1	12	12.0	0	12	0.9
Total	13-	278	3229	11.6	21	90	248.4

=== Defense ===
Name	GP	Tackles				Sacks	Pass defense		Interceptions				Fumbles		Blkd Kick
Name	GP	Solo	Ast	Total	TFL-Yds	No-Yds	BrUp	QBH	No.-Yds	Avg	TD	Long	Rcv-Yds	FF	Blkd Kick
Adrien Cole	13	79	49	128	13.0–49	2.0–15	5	4	1–45			45	1–0	1	3
Jay Dudley	13	55	47	102	8.0–32		3	1	4–94				1–0		
Total															

=== Special teams ===
Name	Punting								Kickoffs				
Name	No.	Yds	Avg	Long	TB	FC	I20	Blkd	No.	Yds	Avg	TB	OB
Ryan Allen	83	3828	46.1	72	5	28	39	0					
Nick Isham	2	77	38.5	41	2	0	0	0					
TEAM	0	3	0.0	3	0	0	0	1					
Matt Nelson									77	4673	60.7	10	0
Total	85	3908	46.0	72	7	28	39	1	77	4673	60.7	10	0

Name	Punt returns					Kick returns				
Name	No.	Yds	Avg	TD	Long	No.	Yds	Avg	TD	Long
Andrew Guillot	14	168	12.0	0	52	1	16	16.0	0	16
Quinton Patton	8	27	3.4	0	17	6	98	16.3	0	33
Craig Johnson	4	80	20.0	1	82					
Jay Dudley	1	4	4.0	0	4					
Terry Carter	1	−10	−10.0	0	0					
Lyle Fitte						22	575	26.1	1	86
Levander Liggins						18	409	22.7	0	40
Chandler Spence						3	48	16.0	0	18
Richie Casey						2	30	15.0	0	16
Total	28	269	9.6	1	82	52	1176	22.6	1	86
