= Tony Franklin (American football coach) =

American football player and coach (born 1957)

Biographical details
- Born: August 29, 1957 (age 69); Princeton, Kentucky, U.S.

Playing career
- 1976–1977: Murray State
- Position: Running back

Coaching career (HC unless noted)
- 1988–1991: Calloway County HS (KY)
- 1993–1995: Mayfield HS (KY) (assistant)
- 1996: Mercer County HS (KY)
- 1997–1998: Kentucky (RB)
- 1999–2000: Kentucky (OC/WR)
- 2003: Lexington Horsemen
- 2006–2007: Troy (OC/QB)
- 2008: Auburn (OC/QB)
- 2009: Middle Tennessee (OC/QB)
- 2010–2012: Louisiana Tech (OC/QB)
- 2013–2014: California (OC/QB)
- 2015: California (OC/QB/RB)
- 2016–2020: Middle Tennessee (OC/QB)
- 2022–2023: Army Sprint (OC/QB)
- 2025: Louisiana Tech (OC/QB)

Tony Franklin (born August 29, 1957) is an American former college football coach who was most recently the offensive coordinator and quarterbacks coach for Louisiana Tech. He previsouly served as the offensive coordinator for the Army Black Knights sprint football team. Previously, he held the same position with the Middle Tennessee Blue Raiders of Conference USA after making a move from the same position with the California Golden Bears. He announced his retirement from MTSU soon after the new year in 2021, following the completion of a challenging 2020 season. On February 6, 2026, Franklin announced that he would be retiring from coaching for a second time.

Franklin was previously the quarterbacks coach and offensive coordinator of the Auburn University football team, before being fired from that position on October 8, 2008.

While he was a coach at Kentucky, quarterbacks Dusty Bonner and Jared Lorenzen each led the SEC in passing.

While a running back in college at Murray State in 1977, Franklin was a teammate of fellow future coach Bud Foster, who later came to prominence as the Virginia Tech defensive coordinator.

== Coaching career ==
Franklin began his career as a high school coach in 1979, including a stint at Calloway County High School where he coached Mr. Football in Kentucky, Pookie Jones, who went to play at Kentucky. Franklin continued coaching in the high school ranks at other schools, including perennial state championship contender Mayfield High School, winning two state titles. He was the head football coach for one year at Mercer County Senior High School before he was hired by Hal Mumme in 1997 to coach running backs at Kentucky.

=== Kentucky ===
After Mike Leach was hired away by Oklahoma, Franklin was named offensive coordinator for the 2000 season and led the Wildcats to the nation's 2nd-best passing offense, as well as the nation's 11th-best team in total offense (445 yards per game). He helped lead the Wildcats to their first back-to-back bowl appearances in 15 years and their first New Year's bowl game appearance in 50 seasons. During his tenure at Kentucky, Franklin was named one of the top 10 recruiters in the South.

In 2003, Franklin was chosen as general manager and head coach of the expansion franchise Lexington Horsemen of the National Indoor Football League, successfully leading the team to the playoffs in their inaugural season. The team led the Atlantic Division in scoring, averaging 53.1 points per game.

=== Troy ===
In 2006, Franklin was hired by Larry Blakeney to serve as offensive coordinator and quarterbacks coach at Troy University. In his first season at Troy, Franklin turned the teams stuttering offense around from the last placed offensive unit in the Sun Belt Conference prior to his arrival, to leading the league in passing and ranking second in overall offense. This remarkable turnaround helped the Trojans earn their first Sun Belt Conference title as well as the school's first bowl win, with a victory in the New Orleans Bowl. Prior to Franklin's arrival, Troy hadn't ranked better than 109th nationally in total offense in the previous four seasons. In 2007, the Trojans ranked 16th nationally in total offense (453 yards per game) and 25th nationally in scoring offense (34 points per game), helping the team win back to back Sun Belt Conference titles.

=== Auburn ===
After spending two seasons with the Trojans, Franklin was hired on December 12, 2007, by Tommy Tuberville to serve as offensive coordinator and quarterbacks coach at Auburn University. Franklin implemented his new spread offense with only 8 days of practice, prior to the 2007 Chick-fil-A Bowl. The new system proved quite effective as Auburn bested their season average in all offensive categories, posting 423 yards of offense (233 passing / 190 rushing), had 24 first downs and ran an 11-year high 93 offensive plays, all despite playing against the #6 defense in the nation.

The Tigers' offense was much less impressive at the start of the 2008 season. Auburn started the season with a somewhat disappointing 4–2 record, losing to LSU and Vanderbilt and having close calls against two struggling teams in Mississippi State and Tennessee. After the first six games, Auburn ranked 104th in total offense out of all FBS teams.

On Wednesday, October 8, 2008, Auburn head coach Tuberville fired Franklin, citing a lack of offensive production from Franklin's spread offense, and noting Auburn's diminishing rank in most of the offensive categories in the FBS.

=== Middle Tennessee ===
On February 5, 2009, Franklin was hired to fill the vacant position of offensive coordinator at Middle Tennessee State University. He replaced G.A. Mangus, who left MTSU to become the quarterbacks coach at South Carolina under his college coach Steve Spurrier.

Under Franklin's tutelage, the Blue Raiders offense improved from 7th in the conference in scoring before his arrival (and 84th in the nation) to 2nd in the conference his first season (and 23rd in the nation). Despite a losing record the year prior, MTSU finished the regular season with a 9–3 record including a win over the Maryland from the Atlantic Coast Conference (the lone conference loss came at Troy). The press characterized the year as redemption for Franklin after the difficulties at Auburn the prior year. Franklin's offense helped the Blue Raiders finish with 10 wins (after beating Southern Mississippi 42–32 in the New Orleans Bowl), the program's best record since it entered the Bowl Subdivision (Division I-A) in 1999, with the offense averaging over 420 yards per game. Franklin's 2009 unit set MTSU records in total yards, passing yards, and total points. Quarterback Dwight Dasher finished the season ranked 7th in the nation in total offense, threw for a school record 23 TD passes, and was named the SBC Player of the Week three times.

=== Louisiana Tech ===
On February 17, 2010, Louisiana Tech head coach Sonny Dykes announced the hiring of Franklin as offensive coordinator. The two had previously worked together on Hal Mumme's staff at Kentucky. In their first season, LA Tech's record improved to 5–7 overall and 4–4 in the WAC, with the offense improving in several areas of the NCAA statistical ranks including passing offense (91st in 2009 to 62nd in 2010) and total offense (66th to 52nd) while the team's average offensive national rank improved from 65th in 2009 to 54th in 2010.

The 2011 team saw significant improvement, winning the program's first WAC football title since 2001. The Bulldogs finished the regular season 8–4 and were invited to play in the Poinsettia Bowl versus 15th ranked TCU. The regular season losses included a defeat in overtime at Mississippi State, 2-point loss at rival Southern Miss (finished season ranked #19 in Coaches Poll) and 1-point loss to Houston (finished season ranked #14 in Coaches Poll). Franklin's offense again made improvements, ranking 42nd nationally in scoring and 45th in passing.

The 2012 Bulldogs again saw remarkable offensive improvement. The team finished the regular season with the nation's top scoring offense (51.5 points per game) and led the conference in every offensive category including points, total yards, rushing yards and passing yards. The offense included a well-balanced attack with runningback Kenneth Dixon leading the country in scoring, quarterback Colby Cameron finishing 4th nationally in total offense, receiver Quinton Patton finishing 4th nationally in receiving yards per game.

Despite having one of the most successful seasons in school history, it was reported on December 2 that the Bulldogs would not play in a bowl game. They were initially invited to the Independence Bowl but the school administration asked for more time to decide to see if other options opened up. No other bowl invited them and the Independence Bowl selected Ohio instead.

=== California ===
On December 5, 2012, it was announced that head coach Sonny Dykes would be leaving Louisiana Tech to take the position as the head football coach at the University of California, Berkeley. The first assistant to be hired by Dykes at Cal was Tony Franklin as offensive coordinator.

The 2013 Cal football team finished 1–11. Their only win came against Portland State (an FCS team), by a margin of only 7 points. Cal's 2013 season amounted to the single worst record in the history of a program that first started playing football in 1886. The team failed to score 18 or more points in one third of its games.

The 2014 season was a year for redemption for the Tony Franklin system at Cal. Franklin's offense drastically improved productivity, especially in the passing game. Cal ranked 10th nationally in passing yards, and 31st national in overall offense. The Bears showed marked improvement, going 5–7 and just missing bowl eligibility.

In 2015, Cal finished 8–5, including a 55–36 victory over Air Force in the Armed Forces Bowl. That year was the junior year for quarterback Jared Goff, whom he coached to conference records in passing yards record (4,714) and touchdown passes (43) in one season.

=== Middle Tennessee State ===
In 2016 he tutored two first team all-conference picks (WR Richie James and RB I’Tavius Mathers) and a freshman All-American (Ty Lee)

2016 offense produced a 1,000-yard rusher and a 1,000-yard receiver for the first time in school history

2016 offense set single-season records in total offense, total yards/game, total yards/play, points scored, passing yards, pass attempts, pass completions, touchdown passes, total touchdowns, first downs and all-purpose yards

Coordinated an offense that ranked second in C-USA and No. 8 in the country in total offense, averaging a school record 517.7 yards per game in 2016

In 2018, QB Brent Stockstill was named C-USA MVP

Under his tutelage, Brent Stockstill became the school's all-time leader in passing yards, passing touchdowns, and completions while WR Richie James ended his career as the all-time leader in receptions, receiving yards and touchdown catches

In 2019, Ty Lee became the school's all-time leading receiver and Asher O’Hara was just the second QB to rush for over 1,000 yards

=== Army Sprint Football ===
In the 2022 season Franklin led the Black Knights to a league leading 42.5 Points Per Game and 453.8 Yards Per Game.

== Instruction ==
Tony Franklin is well known for owning and operating The Tony Franklin System Seminar. His copyrighted offensive system has been implemented by over 351 high school and college programs in 44 states across the nation, grossing over $170,000 annually from his consulting services. Several college coaches including Sonny Dykes at Arizona, Chris Hatcher at Murray State and Ed Argast at Fordham consult with Franklin about their offenses. Pro Football Hall of Famer John Hannah says of the system "If both teams have players who are equal in talent, this offense is impossible to stop".

After taking the offensive coordinator job at Auburn, Franklin was forced to sell the ownership of his football consulting business to partners because of a SEC rule prohibiting coaches from participating in a clinic not on the institution's premises. The system became known as The System Seminars . Since his departure from Auburn, he has again taken control of the business and gone back to the title "The Tony Franklin System".

Besides his offensive consulting work, Franklin has written a pair of football related books. In 2001, Franklin authored a nationally acclaimed book titled Fourth Down and Life To Go (ISBN 9780971428003), which chronicled his experiences with coaching football in Kentucky. The book detailed the inner workings of the Kentucky football program and effectively blacklisted him from coaching from 2001 to 2005 until he was hired at Troy. He authored a second book in 2005 titled Victor's Victory (ISBN 9780971428010), which dealt with the sudden death of 15-year-old Hoover High School football player Victor Dionte Hill, who died from a cardiac arrest during one of Franklin's consulting sessions. The book urges schools and youth organizations to make automated external defibrillators universally available.
