= 2011 TCU Horned Frogs football team =

American college football season

2011 TCU Horned Frogs football

Mountain West champion Poinsettia Bowl champion

Poinsettia Bowl, W 31–24 vs. Louisiana Tech
- Conference: Mountain West Conference

Ranking
- Coaches: No. 13
- AP: No. 14
- Record: 11–2 (7–0 MW)
- Head coach: Gary Patterson (11th season)
- Co-offensive coordinators: Jarrett Anderson (3rd season); Justin Fuente (3rd season)
- Offensive scheme: Spread
- Defensive coordinator: Dick Bumpas (8th season)
- Base defense: 4–2–5
- Home stadium: Amon G. Carter Stadium

2011 Mountain West Conference football standings
	Conf.			Overall
Team	W		L	W		L
No. 14 TCU $	7	–	0	11	–	2
No. 8 Boise State	6	–	1	12	–	1
Wyoming	5	–	2	8	–	5
San Diego State	4	–	3	8	–	5
Air Force	3	–	4	7	–	6
Colorado State	1	–	6	3	–	9
UNLV	1	–	6	2	–	10
New Mexico	1	–	6	1	–	11
$ – Conference champion; Rankings from AP Poll

The 2011 TCU Horned Frogs football team represented Texas Christian University in the 2011 NCAA Division I FBS football season. The Horned Frogs were led by 11th-year head coach Gary Patterson and played their home games at Amon G. Carter Stadium. They were members of the Mountain West Conference. They finished the season 11–2, 7–0 in Mountain West play to win their third straight conference championship. They were invited to the Poinsettia Bowl, where they defeated Western Athletic Conference champion Louisiana Tech, 31–24.

This was the Horned Frogs last year as a member of the Mountain West. They were originally set to become a member of the Big East Conference in the 2012 season. However, on October 10, they accepted a bid to join the Big 12 Conference. The Big 12 has several other former members of the Southwest Conference, notably Baylor, one of TCU's most intense rivals in history.

== Before the season ==
During the 2010–2011 campaign, the Horned Frogs finished the season undefeated, 13–0 and being voted #2 in the Coaches and AP polls. The Horned Frog's 2010 season was capped off with a 21–19 victory over Wisconsin in the 2011 Rose Bowl. During the off-season, quarterback Andy Dalton, who had won 43 games for TCU, left for the NFL, leading to Casey Pachall to take over as quarterback. At the Mountain West Conference media day, the Horned Frogs were picked to finish 2nd in the conference.

=== Recruiting ===
TCU's recruiting class was ranked #26 by Rivals.com and #28 by Scout.com. The top 10 recruits according to ESPN grades are listed below:

College recruiting (2011)
Name	Hometown	School	Height	Weight	40^{‡}	Commit date
LaDarius Brown; WR	Waxahachie, TX	Waxahachie	6 ft 2 in (1.88 m)	190 lb (86 kg)	4.4	Dec 13, 2010
LaDarius Brown; WR	Recruit ratings: Scout: Rivals: (81)					
Deryck Gildon; OLB	Arlington, TX	Martin	6 ft 2 in (1.88 m)	205 lb (93 kg)	4.5	Mar 8, 2010
Deryck Gildon; OLB	Recruit ratings: Scout: Rivals: (80)					
Brandon Carter; WR	Euless, TX	Trinity	5 ft 11 in (1.80 m)	161 lb (73 kg)	N/A	Jan 18, 2011
Brandon Carter; WR	Recruit ratings: Scout: Rivals: (79)					
Cameron White; LB	DeSoto, TX	DeSoto	6 ft 2 in (1.88 m)	185 lb (84 kg)	4.4	Jun 18, 2010
Cameron White; LB	Recruit ratings: Scout: Rivals: (78)					
Jamelle Naff; OT	Del City, OK	Del City	6 ft 4 in (1.93 m)	310 lb (140 kg)	N/A	Jan 16, 2011
Jamelle Naff; OT	Recruit ratings: Scout: Rivals: (79)					
Dominic Merka; QB	Crosby, TX	Crosby	6 ft 5 in (1.96 m)	220 lb (100 kg)	N/A	May 7, 2010
Dominic Merka; QB	Recruit ratings: Scout: Rivals: (79)					
Jon Lewis; DT	Spring, TX	Klein Oak	6 ft 2 in (1.88 m)	265 lb (120 kg)	N/A	Jan 16, 2010
Jon Lewis; DT	Recruit ratings: Scout: Rivals: (78)					
David Bush; ATH	Tyler, TX	John Tyler	5 ft 10 in (1.78 m)	165 lb (75 kg)	4.5	Mar 1, 2010
David Bush; ATH	Recruit ratings: Scout: Rivals: (78)					
Carter Wall; OT	Austin, TX	William B. Travis	6 ft 5 in (1.96 m)	265 lb (120 kg)	N/A	Jan 18, 2011
Carter Wall; OT	Recruit ratings: Scout: Rivals: (78)					
Laderice Sanders; OLB	Arlington, TX	Arlington	6 ft 1 in (1.85 m)	220 lb (100 kg)	4.6	Mar 29, 2010
Laderice Sanders; OLB	Recruit ratings: Scout: Rivals: (78)					
Overall recruit ranking: Scout: 28 Rivals: 26 ESPN: 21
‡ Refers to 40-yard dash; Note: In many cases, Scout, Rivals, 247Sports, On3, and ESPN may conflict in their listings of height, weight and 40 time.; In these cases, the average was taken. ESPN grades are on a 100-point scale.; Sources: "TCU Signee List 2011". Rivals.; "Scout.com Football Recruiting: TCU". Scout.; "2011 Player Signees- TCU". ESPN.; "Scout.com Team Recruiting Rankings". Scout.; "2011 Team Ranking". Rivals.com.

== Schedule ==
Date	Time	Opponent	Rank	Site	TV	Result	Attendance
September 2	7:00 p.m.	at Baylor*	No. 14	Floyd Casey Stadium; Waco, TX (rivalry)	ESPN	L 48–50	43,753
September 10	2:30 p.m.	at Air Force	No. 25	Falcon Stadium; Colorado Springs, CO	Versus	W 35–19	42,107
September 17	1:00 p.m.	Louisiana-Monroe*	No. 23	Amon G. Carter Stadium; Fort Worth, TX	Mtn.	W 38–17	32,719
September 24	6:00 p.m.	Portland State*	No. 20	Amon G. Carter Stadium; Fort Worth, TX		W 55–13	33,825
October 1	2:30 p.m.	SMU*	No. 20	Amon G. Carter Stadium; Fort Worth, TX (Battle for the Iron Skillet)	CBSSN	L 33–40 ^{OT}	35,632
October 8	9:30 p.m.	at San Diego State		Qualcomm Stadium; San Diego, CA	CBSSN	W 27–14	44,248
October 22	1:00 p.m.	New Mexico^{†}		Amon G. Carter Stadium; Fort Worth, TX	Mtn.	W 69–0	33,833
October 28	7:00 p.m.	vs. BYU*		Cowboys Stadium; Arlington, TX	ESPN	W 38–28	50,094
November 5	1:00 p.m.	at Wyoming		War Memorial Stadium; Laramie, WY	Mtn.	W 31–20	17,673
November 12	2:30 p.m.	at No. 5 Boise State		Bronco Stadium; Boise, ID	Versus	W 36–35	34,146
November 19	2:30 p.m.	Colorado State	No. 19	Amon G. Carter Stadium; Fort Worth, TX	Versus	W 34–10	33,650
December 3	1:30 p.m.	UNLV	No. 18	Amon G. Carter Stadium; Fort Worth, TX	Versus	W 56–9	32,012
December 21	7:00 p.m.	vs. Louisiana Tech*	No. 16	Qualcomm Stadium; San Diego, CA (Poinsettia Bowl)	ESPN	W 31–24	24,607
*Non-conference game; ^{†}Homecoming; Rankings from AP Poll released prior to the game; All times are in Central time

== Regular season ==
TCU began the season being upset by then-former (and future) conference rival Baylor 48–50, ending the Horned Frogs' 25-regular-season-game winning streak. TCU then won their next three games against Air Force, Louisiana–Monroe and Portland State before losing in overtime 33–40 to SMU in Battle for the Iron Skillet.

After the loss against SMU, TCU won out the rest of its regular-season schedule to win its third straight Mountain West Conference championship. TCU's biggest victory was against #5 Boise State at Bronco Stadium. TCU won the game 36–35 on a two-point conversion. The victory ended Boise State's record 65-game regular-season home winning streak and 47-game conference home winning streak. After Houston lost the 2011 Conference USA Football Championship Game, there was a chance for TCU to reach a BCS game for a third straight year. However, TCU finished #18 in the BCS standings and missed out on attending a BCS bowl.

== 2011 Poinsettia Bowl ==
On December 4, 2011, the TCU Horned Frogs accepted an invite to represent the MWC. Their opponents were the Louisiana Tech Bulldogs, the 2011 WAC champions. The game was played at Snapdragon Stadium.

TCU won the game 31-24. With the win, TCU coach Gary Patterson picked up his 109th victory, tying Dutch Meyer for the most wins in TCU history.

== Rankings ==
Ranking movements Legend: ██ Increase in ranking ██ Decrease in ranking — = Not ranked RV = Received votes
	Week															
Poll	Pre	1	2	3	4	5	6	7	8	9	10	11	12	13	14	Final
AP	14	25	23	20	20	—	—	—	—	RV	RV	19	19	18	16	14
Coaches	15	25	23	20	20	—	RV	RV	RV	RV	24	19	18	17	15	13
Harris	Not released						RV	RV	RV	RV	25	21	19	17	15	Not released
BCS	Not released							—	—	—	—	19	20	18	18	Not released
