= 2011 Fresno State Bulldogs football team =

American college football season

2011 Fresno State Bulldogs football
- Conference: Western Athletic Conference
- Record: 4–9 (3–4 WAC)
- Head coach: Pat Hill (15th season)
- Offensive scheme: Pro-style
- Defensive coordinator: Randy Stewart (3rd season)
- Base defense: 4–3
- Home stadium: Bulldog Stadium

2011 Western Athletic Conference football standings
	Conf.			Overall
Team	W		L	W		L
Louisiana Tech $	6	–	1	8	–	5
Nevada	5	–	2	7	–	6
Utah State	5	–	2	7	–	6
Hawaii	3	–	4	6	–	7
San Jose State	3	–	4	5	–	7
Fresno State	3	–	4	4	–	9
New Mexico State	2	–	5	4	–	9
Idaho	1	–	6	2	–	10
$ – Conference champion

The 2011 Fresno State Bulldogs football team represented California State University, Fresno in the 2011 NCAA Division I FBS football season. The Bulldogs were led by 15th-year head coach Pat Hill and played their home games at Bulldog Stadium. They were members of the Western Athletic Conference (WAC). They finished the season 4–9, 3–4 in WAC play to finish in a three way tie for fourth place. Hill was fired at the end of the season after posting a record of 112–80 in 15 seasons. This was the Bulldogs last year as a member of the WAC. They joined the Mountain West Conference for the 2012 season.

== Personnel ==
=== Coaching staff ===
Name	Position	Seasons at Fresno State	Alma mater
Pat Hill	Head coach	15th as HC; 21st overall	UC Riverside (1973)
Randy Stewart	Defensive coordinator	5th	
Tim Skipper	Linebackers/Run game coordinator/Interim defensive coordinator	6th	Fresno State (2001)
Keith Williams	Wide receivers	3rd	San Diego State (1996)

=== Roster ===
- WR Davante Adams
- WR Isaiah Burse
- QB Derek Carr
- WR Josh Harper
- TE Marcel Jensen
- OL Austin Wentworth
- LB Kyrie Wilson
- WR Devon Wylie

== Schedule ==
Date	Time	Opponent	Site	TV	Result	Attendance
September 3	4:00 pm	vs. California*	Candlestick Park; San Francisco, CA (TicketCity Battle by the Bay)	CSNCA	L 21–36	31,563
September 10	4:00 pm	at No. 10 Nebraska*	Memorial Stadium; Lincoln, NE	BTN	L 29–42	85,101
September 17	7:00 pm	North Dakota*	Bulldog Stadium; Fresno, CA	ESPN3	W 27–22	27,542
September 24	2:00 pm	at Idaho	Kibbie Dome; Moscow, ID	WSN/ALT	W 48–24	15,110
October 1	6:15 pm	Ole Miss*	Bulldog Stadium; Fresno, CA	ESPN2	L 28–38	32,063
October 7	6:00 pm	No. 5 Boise State*	Bulldog Stadium; Fresno, CA (Battle for the Milk Can)	ESPN	L 7–57	33,871
October 15	7:00 pm	Utah State^{†}	Bulldog Stadium; Fresno, CA	ESPN3	W 31–21	28,854
October 22	1:00 pm	at Nevada	Mackay Stadium; Reno, NV	WSN	L 38–45	15,113
November 5	7:30 pm	Louisiana Tech	Bulldog Stadium; Fresno, CA	ESPNU	L 21–41	27,965
November 12	5:00 pm	at New Mexico State	Aggie Memorial Stadium; Las Cruces, NM	WSN/ALT	L 45–48	14,227
November 19	8:00 pm	at Hawaii	Aloha Stadium; Honolulu, HI (rivalry)	WSN/ALT	W 24–21	28,907
November 26	5:00 pm	San Jose State	Bulldog Stadium; Fresno, CA (rivalry)		L 24–27	25,492
December 3	5:00 pm	at San Diego State*	Qualcomm Stadium; San Diego, CA (rivalry)	CBSSN	L 28–35	32,790
*Non-conference game; ^{†}Homecoming; Rankings from AP Poll released prior to the game; All times are in Pacific time

== Game summaries ==
=== Vs. California ===
	1	2	3	4	Total
Bulldogs	7	7	0	7	21
Golden Bears	19	0	14	3	36

=== At No. 10 Nebraska ===
	1	2	3	4	Total
Bulldogs	14	3	3	9	29
Cornhuskers	7	7	7	21	42

=== North Dakota ===
	1	2	3	4	Total
Fighting Sioux	9	0	13	0	22
Bulldogs	14	7	0	6	27

=== At Idaho ===
	1	2	3	4	Total
Bulldogs	10	14	17	7	48
Vandals	7	10	0	7	24

=== Ole Miss ===
	1	2	3	4	Total
Rebels	13	7	7	11	38
Bulldogs	14	0	14	0	28

=== No. 6 Boise State ===
	1	2	3	4	Total
No. 6 Broncos	16	21	13	7	57
Bulldogs	0	0	0	7	7

=== Utah State ===
	1	2	3	4	Total
Aggies	14	7	0	0	21
Bulldogs	7	7	3	14	31

=== At Nevada ===
	1	2	3	4	Total
Bulldogs	7	10	7	14	38
Wolf Pack	13	10	7	15	45

=== Louisiana Tech ===
	1	2	3	4	Total
Louisiana Tech Bulldogs	14	20	7	0	41
Fresno State Bulldogs	0	7	7	7	21

=== At New Mexico State ===
	1	2	3	4	Total
Bulldogs	7	10	21	7	45
Aggies	7	16	15	10	48

=== At Hawaii ===
	1	2	3	4	Total
Bulldogs	10	7	0	7	24
Warriors	0	7	14	0	21

=== San José State ===
	1	2	3	4	Total
Spartans	7	3	10	7	27
Bulldogs	10	7	0	7	24

=== At San Diego State ===
	1	2	3	4	Total
Bulldogs	7	14	0	7	28
Aztecs	0	14	14	7	35
