= 2011 San Jose State Spartans football team =

American college football season

2011 San Jose State Spartans football
- Conference: Western Athletic Conference
- Record: 5–7 (3–4 WAC)
- Head coach: Mike MacIntyre (2nd season)
- Offensive coordinator: John DeFilippo (1st season)
- Defensive coordinator: Kent Baer (2nd season)
- Home stadium: Spartan Stadium

2011 Western Athletic Conference football standings
	Conf.			Overall
Team	W		L	W		L
Louisiana Tech $	6	–	1	8	–	5
Nevada	5	–	2	7	–	6
Utah State	5	–	2	7	–	6
Hawaii	3	–	4	6	–	7
San Jose State	3	–	4	5	–	7
Fresno State	3	–	4	4	–	9
New Mexico State	2	–	5	4	–	9
Idaho	1	–	6	2	–	10
$ – Conference champion

The 2011 San Jose State Spartans football team represented San Jose State University in the 2011 NCAA Division I FBS football season. The Spartans were led by second year head coach Mike MacIntyre and played their home games at Spartan Stadium. They are members of the Western Athletic Conference. The Spartans finished the season with a record of 5–7, 3–4 in WAC play to finish in a three way tie for fourth place.

== Schedule ==
Date	Time	Opponent	Site	TV	Result	Attendance
September 3	2:00 pm	at No. 6 Stanford*	Stanford Stadium; Stanford, CA (Bill Walsh Legacy Game)	CSNBA	L 3–57	47,816
September 10	7:00 pm	at UCLA*	Rose Bowl; Pasadena, CA	FSNPT	L 17–27	42,685
September 17	1:00 pm	Nevada	Spartan Stadium; San Jose, CA	WSN/ALT	L 14–17	17,238
September 24	1:00 pm	New Mexico State	Spartan Stadium; San Jose, CA	ESPN3	W 34–24	13,456
October 1	1:00 pm	at Colorado State*	Sonny Lubick Field at Hughes Stadium; Fort Collins, CO	The Mtn.	W 38–31	27,683
October 8	7:15 pm	at BYU*	LaVell Edwards Stadium; Provo, UT	ESPNU	L 16–29	59,782
October 14	6:00 pm	Hawaiʻi^{†}	Spartan Stadium; San Jose, CA (Dick Tomey Legacy Game)	ESPN	W 28–27	24,643
October 29	1:00 pm	at Louisiana Tech	Joe Aillet Stadium; Ruston, LA		L 28–38	19,642
November 5	1:00 pm	Idaho	Spartan Stadium; San Jose, CA	WSN/ALT	L 29–32	10,621
November 12	12:00 pm	at Utah State	Romney Stadium; Logan, UT	ESPN3	L 33–34	14,593
November 19	1:00 pm	Navy*	Spartan Stadium; San Jose, CA	ESPN3	W 27–24	25,114
November 26	5:00 pm	at Fresno State	Bulldog Stadium; Fresno, CA (rivalry)		W 27–24	25,492
*Non-conference game; ^{†}Homecoming; Rankings from Coaches' Poll released prior to the game; All times are in Pacific time

== Game summaries ==
=== At No. 6 Stanford ===
	1	2	3	4	Total
Spartans	0	3	0	0	3
No. 6 Cardinal	10	17	16	14	57

=== At UCLA ===
	1	2	3	4	Total
Spartans	0	7	10	0	17
Bruins	7	7	3	10	27

=== Nevada ===
	1	2	3	4	Total
Wolf Pack	7	7	3	0	17
Spartans	7	0	0	7	14

=== New Mexico State ===
	1	2	3	4	Total
Aggies	3	7	14	0	24
Spartans	7	3	14	10	34

=== At Colorado State ===
	1	2	3	4	Total
Spartans	10	14	7	7	38
Rams	7	7	10	7	31

=== At BYU ===
	1	2	3	4	Total
Spartans	3	3	7	3	16
Cougars	9	14	3	3	29

=== Hawaii ===
	1	2	3	4	Total
Warriors	7	0	14	6	27
Spartans	0	20	0	8	28

=== At Louisiana Tech ===
	1	2	3	4	Total
Spartans	7	7	8	6	28
Bulldogs	3	21	14	0	38

=== Idaho ===
	1	2	3	4	Total
Vandals	0	10	0	22	32
Spartans	17	5	0	7	29

=== At Utah State ===
	1	2	3	4	Total
Spartans	20	0	3	10	33
Aggies	7	0	14	13	34

=== Navy ===
	1	2	3	4	Total
Midshipmen	0	14	10	0	24
Spartans	10	10	0	7	27

=== At Fresno State ===
	1	2	3	4	Total
Spartans	7	3	10	7	27
Bulldogs	10	7	0	7	24

== Personnel ==
=== Coaching staff ===
Mike MacIntyre returned for his second season as San Jose State head coach, coming off a 1-12 season in 2010.

Name	Position	Seasons at San Jose State	Alma mater
Mike MacIntyre	Head coach	2	Georgia Tech (1989)
Klayton Adams	Tight ends	1	Boise State (2005)
Kent Baer	Defensive coordinator, linebackers	4	Utah State (1973)
Gary Bernardi	Offensive line	2	Cal State Northridge (1976)
Charles Clark	Defensive backs	2	Mississippi (2007)
John DeFilippo	Offensive coordinator, quarterbacks	2	James Madison (2000)
Kirk Doll	Special teams, running backs	1	East Carolina (1974)
Jim Jeffcoat	Defensive line	1	Arizona (1982)
Andy LaRussa	Cornerbacks, special teams (assistant)	1	Southern Utah (2002)
Terry Malley	Wide receivers, recruiting coordinator	3	Santa Clara (1976)

=== Depth chart ===
These are the starters and backups listed in the final depth chart of the season.

Defense

FS
James Orth
Alex Germany
⋅

WLB	MLB	SLB
⋅	Pompey Festejo	⋅
Derek Muaava	Vince Buhagiar	⋅
⋅	⋅	⋅

SS
Duke Ihenacho
Cullen Newsome
⋅

CB
Peyton Thompson
Forrest Hightower
⋅

DE	DT	DT	DE
Travis Johnson	Andrew Moeaki	Travis Raciti	Mohamed Marah
David Tuitupou	Ja'Rodd Watson	Anthony Larceval	Cedric Lousi
Vincent Abbott	Pablo Garcia	Marcus Howard	Sean Bacon

CB
Ronnie Yell
Bené Benwikere
⋅

Offense

WR
Jabari Carr
Chandler Jones
Kyle Nunn

LT	LG	C	RG	RT
David Quessenberry	Fred Koloto	Robbie Reed	Nicholas Kaspar	Andres Vargas
Amar Pal	Moa Ngatuvai	Reuben Hasani	James Orth	Amar Pal
⋅	Ryan Jones	⋅	⋅	⋅

TE
Ryan Otten
Peter Tuitupou
Sam Tomlitz

WR
Noel Grigsby
Josh Harrison
Michael Avila

QB
Matt Faulkner
Dasmen Stewart
Blake Jurich

RB
Brandon Rutley
Tyler Ervin
Jason Simpson or Ben Thompson

FB
Ina Liaina
Ray Rodriguez
⋅

Special teams
PK Jens Alvernik
PK Harrison Waid
P Harrison Waid
P Jens Alvernik
KR Tyler Ervin
PR Brandon Rutley
LS Ben Zorn
H Evan Taylor

=== Final roster ===
2011 San Jose State Spartans final roster
Quarterbacks: 7 Matt Faulkner – (redshirt) Senior; 16 Joe Gray – Freshman; 14 Blake Jurich – Freshman; 18 Dasmen Stewart – Sophomore; Running backs: 30 Josh Brown – Junior; 20 David Freeman – (redshirt) Junior; 48 Marcos Garces – Senior; 42 Ina Liaina – (redshirt) Junior; 21 Nate Morace – Freshman; 13 Kyler O'Neal – (redshirt) Junior; 46 Ray Rodriguez – (redshirt) Junior; 9 Brandon Rutley – Senior; 32 Jason Simpson – (redshirt) Sophomore; 27 Ben Thompson – (redshirt) Freshman; Wide receivers: 4 Michael Avila – (redshirt) Senior; 3 Sam Boyd – Freshman; 5 Daniel Bradbury – Freshman; 22 Jabari Carr – Freshman; 81 Byron Fobbs – Freshman; 23 Noel Grigsby – (redshirt) Sophomore; 1 Josh Harrison – (redshirt) Senior; 89 Chandler Jones – (redshirt) Sophomore; 44 Chris Kearney – Freshman; 87 Akeem King – (redshirt) Freshman; 84 Sean Linton – (redshirt) Freshman; 17 Kyle Nunn – Sophomore; 11 K.C. Pearce – Freshman; 86 Andrew Reyes – (redshirt) Senior; Tight ends: 88 Travis Lorius – (redshirt) Junior; 80 Max Miller – Junior; 82 Ryan Otten – (redshirt) Junior; 37 Sam Tomlitz – (redshirt) Freshman; 15 Peter Tuitupou – Junior	Offensive linemen: 71 Keith Bendixen – OT – (redshirt) Freshman; 54 Reuben Hasani – C – (redshirt) Sophomore; 74 Ryan Jones – LG – (redshirt) Sophomore; 75 Nicholas Kaspar – RG – Sophomore; 65 Fred Koloto – LG – (redshirt) Senior; 79 Jon Meyer – OT – (redshirt) Junior; 55 Moa Ngatuvai – LG – Sophomore; 73 Jacob Orth – RG – (redshirt) Senior; 61 Amar Pal – OT – (redshirt) Sophomore; 76 David Quessenberry – LT – (redshirt) Junior; 70 Robbie Reed – C – (redshirt) Senior; 77 Justin Satele – C – Freshman; 78 Andres Vargas – RT– (redshirt) Senior; Defensive linemen: 53 Vincent Abbott – RDE – (redshirt) Junior; 95 Sean Bacon – LDE – Freshman; 85 Keenan Brown – DE – (redshirt) Junior; 69 David Catalano – DT – Freshman; 57 Nate Falo – DT – Freshman; 92 Pablo Garcia – RDT – (redshirt) Senior; 86 Christian Hill – DE – Freshman; 96 Marcus Howard – LDT – Freshman; 43 Travis Johnson – RDE – Junior; 97 Anthony Larceval – LDT – (redshirt) Sophomore; 83 Cedric Lousi – LDE – Sophomore; 26 Mohamed Marah – LDE – (redshirt) Senior; 99 Andrew Moeaki – RDT – Senior; 91 Joe Nigos – DT – (redshirt) Senior; 98 Tony Popovich – DT – Freshman; 50 Tracy Pugh – DE – (redshirt) Junior; 90 Travis Raciti – LDT – Freshman; 64 Abasi Salimu – DT – (redshirt) Sophomore; 41 David Tuitupou – RDE – (redshirt) Junior; 93 Foloi Vae – DE – Sophomore; 94 Ja'Rodd Watson – RDT – Senior	Linebackers: 36 Vince Buhagiar – Sophomore; 59 Tristan Coleman – (redshirt) Junior; 11 Josh Fasavalu – Freshman; 3 Pompey Festejo – (redshirt) Senior; 38 Christian Hutchins – Freshman; 34 Derek Muaava – (redshirt) Freshman; 15 Doug Parrish – (redshirt) Freshman; 51 Shannon Penn – Freshman; 31 Keith Smith – Sophomore; 40 Tiuke Tuipulotu – Senior; 41 Jeffrey Telles – (redshirt) Freshman; Defensive backs: 21 Bené Benwikere – RCB – Sophomore; 28 Simon Connette – S – Freshman; 8 Brandon Driver – CB – (redshirt) Senior; 20 Tyler Ervin – DB – Freshman; 24 Rob Fiscalini III – S – Junior; 5 Alex Germany – FS – (redshirt) Senior; 35 Forrest Hightower – LCB – (redshirt) Freshman; 29 Chris Hill – CB – Junior; 2 Duke Ihenacho – SS – Senior; 14 Ralph Jackson – CB – (redshirt) Freshman; 30 Ralph Johnson – CB – (redshirt) Junior; 39 Cullen Newsome – SS – (redshirt) Junior; 6 Damon Ogburn, Jr. – CB – Sophomore; 81 James Orth – FS – Junior; 7 Dennis Rufus – DB – Freshman; 16 Evan Taylor – S – (redshirt) Junior; 19 Peyton Thompson – LCB – (redshirt) Senior; 37 Herbert Whitehurst – CB – Freshman; 25 Ronnie Yell – RCB – Junior; Special teams: 98 Jens Alvernik – PK – Senior; 22 Alex Anastasi – PK – Freshman; 41 Jeffrey Telles – LS – (redshirt) Freshman; 10 Harrison Waid – P – (redshirt) Sophomore; 60 Ben Zorn – LS – Senior
