= 2011 Utah State Aggies football team =

American college football season

2011 Utah State Aggies football
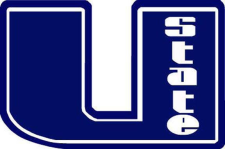

Famous Idaho Potato Bowl vs Ohio, L 23–24
- Conference: Western Athletic Conference
- Record: 7–6 (5–2 WAC)
- Head coach: Gary Andersen (3rd season)
- Offensive coordinator: Dave Baldwin
- Home stadium: Romney Stadium

2011 Western Athletic Conference football standings
	Conf.			Overall
Team	W		L	W		L
Louisiana Tech $	6	–	1	8	–	5
Nevada	5	–	2	7	–	6
Utah State	5	–	2	7	–	6
Hawaii	3	–	4	6	–	7
San Jose State	3	–	4	5	–	7
Fresno State	3	–	4	4	–	9
New Mexico State	2	–	5	4	–	9
Idaho	1	–	6	2	–	10
$ – Conference champion

The 2011 Utah State Aggies football team represented Utah State University in the 2011 NCAA Division I FBS football season. The Aggies were led by third-year head coach Gary Andersen and played their home games at Merlin Olsen Field at Romney Stadium. They are members of the Western Athletic Conference. They finished the season 7–6, 5–2 in WAC play to finish in a tie for second place.

On November 28, The Aggies were invited to the Famous Idaho Potato Bowl which was the school's first bowl bid since 1997 which was in the same bowl game (known then as the Humanitarian Bowl). They lost the Famous Idaho Potato bowl to Ohio.

== Before the Season ==
=== 2011 Recruits ===
College recruiting information (2011)
Name	Hometown	School	Height	Weight	Commit date
Ladale Jackson; CB	Las Vegas	Silverado HS	5 ft 10 in (1.78 m)	163 lb (74 kg)	Feb 2, 2011
Ladale Jackson; CB	Recruit ratings: Scout: Rivals: (75)				
Bridger Peck; OLB	South Jordan, Utah	Bingham HS	6 ft 1 in (1.85 m)	193 lb (88 kg)	Feb 2, 2011
Bridger Peck; OLB	Recruit ratings: Scout: Rivals: (73)				
Chuckie Keeton; ATH	Houston	Cypress Creek HS	6 ft 1 in (1.85 m)	177 lb (80 kg)	Feb 2, 2011
Chuckie Keeton; ATH	Recruit ratings: Scout: Rivals: (73)				
Brandon Swindall; WR	Oklahoma City	Millwood HS	6 ft 1 in (1.85 m)	170 lb (77 kg)	Feb 2, 2011
Brandon Swindall; WR	Recruit ratings: Scout: Rivals: (72)				
Taani Fisilau; OG	Salt Lake City	Cottonwood HS	6 ft 1 in (1.85 m)	296 lb (134 kg)	Feb 2, 2011
Taani Fisilau; OG	Recruit ratings: Scout: Rivals: (70)				
Overall recruit ranking:
Note: In many cases, Scout, Rivals, 247Sports, On3, and ESPN may conflict in their listings of height and weight.; In these cases, the average was taken. ESPN grades are on a 100-point scale.; Sources: "Utah State 2011 Football Commitments". Rivals.; "2011 Utah State Football Commits". Scout.; "2011 Player Commits". ESPN.; "Scout.com Team Recruiting Rankings". Scout.; "2011 Team Ranking". Rivals.com.

== Roster ==
2011 Utah State Aggies football team roster
Players
Coaches
Offense

Pos.	#	Name	Class
WR	1	Xavier Martin	Sr
QB	2	Adam Kennedy	Jr
WR	4	Matt Austin	Jr
WR	5	Rashard Stewart	So
RB	6	Robert Turbin	Jr
WR	7	Travis Van Leeuwen	So
WR	8	Travis Reynolds	So
WR	11	Stanley Morrison	Sr
WR	12	Dontel Watkins	Jr
QB	13	Tanner Curtis	Fr
QB	14	Taylor Hughes	Sr
QB	16	Chuckie Keeton	Fr
WR	17	Lars Gunderson	So
WR	18	Shaan Johnson	Fr
RB	20	Michael Smith	Sr
TE	22	Keegan Andersen	Fr
WR	23	Reuben Thomas	Jr
WR	24	Austin Alder	Sr
RB	25	Kerwynn Williams	Jr
RB	27	Robert Marshall	So
RB	28	Joey DeMartino	Jr
RB	31	Paul Clark	Fr
RB	32	Joe Hill	Fr
RB	33	Josh Flores	Sr
OL	54	Jamie Markosian	So
OL	56	Don Corbell	Fr
C	58	Tyler Larsen	So
OL	62	Bryce Walker	Fr
OL	63	Tanner Richins	Jr
OL	64	Josh Larmay	So
OL	65	Chris Friesen	So
OL	66	Eric Schultz	So
OL	67	Oscar Molina-Sanchez	Jr
G	68	Philip Gapelu	Sr
OL	69	Stetson Tenney	Jr
OL	74	Kyle Whimpey	So
OL	75	Taani Fisilau	Fr
G	76	Funaki Asisi	Sr
OL	78	Jorden Mattinson	Fr
C	79	Robert Hill	Sr
WR	80	Chuck Jacobs	Jr
TE	81	Kellen Bartlett	Sr
WR	82	Eric Moats	Sr
WR	83	Josh Johansen	Sr
WR	84	Cameron Webb	Jr
WR	85	Brandon Swindall	Fr
TE	86	Brad Theurer	So
TE	88	Tarren Lloyd	Sr
WR	89	Jordan Storrs	Fr
TE	91	D.J. Tialavea	So

Defense

Pos.	#	Name	Class
CB	1	Nevin Lawson	So
CB	2	Cameron Sanders	So
CB	3	Quinton Byrd	Jr
S	4	Walter McClenton	Sr
LB	5	Jason Fanaika	So
LB	9	Bobby Wagner	Sr
CB	10	Ladale Jackson	Fr
S	10	Chris Harris	Sr
CB	13	Jumanne Robertson	Jr
CB	14	Jamaine Olson	Jr
LB	15	Reuben Willis	Sr
LB	16	Tavaris McMillian	Fr
CB	17	Will Davis	Jr
CB	21	Terrence Alston	Jr
S	21	Brian Suite	Fr
CB	23	JD Oglivie	So
CB	24	Isaiah Jones	Jr
S	25	Cedric Provost	Fr
S	26	Michael Oknokwo	Fr
S	26	Frankie Sutera	Fr
LB	26	Gavin Jones	Sr
CB	27	Dee Hamala	Fr
S	29	Alfred Bowden	Sr
S	30	Nick Vought	Sr
LB	31	Parker Hausknecht	Fr
CB	34	Terell Thompson	Jr
S	36	McKade Brady	Jr
DE	37	Quinn Garner	Sr
DE	40	Connor Willams	So
S	42	La'Bradford Harold	Fr
LB	43	Kyle Gallagher	Sr
LB	45	Maurice Alexander	Jr
DE	47	Levi Koskan	Sr
LB	48	Chris Fox	Fr
LB	49	Forrest Dabb	Jr
LB	50	Jefferson Court	Fr
LB	51	Jake Doughty	So
LB	52	Kyler Fackrell	Fr
LB	53	Zach Vigil	So
LB	55	Bojay Filimoeatu	Jr
DL	57	Havea Lasike	Jr
LB	58	Travis Swann	Fr
DL	70	Travis Seefeldt	Fr
DL	72	Jordan Nielsen	Fr
DL	77	Al Lapuaho	Jr
DL	78	Kevin Whimpey	So
DL	92	Derek Keller	Fr
DL	95	Tevita Vaifoou	Fr
DL	96	Elvis Kamana-Matagi	Fr
DL	99	B.J. Larsen	Fr

Special teams

Pos.	#	Name	Class
PK	19	Josh Thompson	Fr
PK	38	Jaron Bentrude	Fr
P	41	Tyler Bennett	Jr
PK	42	Riley Harper	Fr
PK	44	Jacob Haueter	Fr
LS	89	Nate Needham	Fr
PK	93	Nick Diaz	So
LS	97	Mark Hutchinson	Fr

Head coach

- Gary Andersen (Utah)

Coordinators/assistant coaches

- Bill Busch (Nebraska Wesleyan)
  Assoc. Head Coach / Special Teams Coord. / Safeties

Legend

- (C) Team captain
- (S) Suspended
- (I) Ineligible
- Injured
- Redshirt

Roster

== Schedule ==
Date	Time	Opponent	Site	TV	Result	Attendance
September 3	10:00 am	at No. 19 Auburn*	Jordan–Hare Stadium; Auburn, AL	ESPN2	L 38–42	85,245
September 10	6:00 pm	Weber State*	Romney Stadium; Logan, UT	ESPN3	W 54–17	18,239
September 24	6:00 pm	Colorado State*^{†}	Romney Stadium; Logan, UT	KCSG	L 34–35 ^{2OT}	22,599
September 30	6:00 pm	at BYU*	LaVell Edwards Stadium; Provo, UT (Beehive Boot)	ESPN	L 24–27	63,513
October 8	6:00 pm	Wyoming*	Romney Stadium; Logan, UT (rivalry)	KCSG	W 63–19	17,561
October 15	8:00 pm	at Fresno State	Bulldog Stadium; Fresno, CA	ESPN3	L 21–31	28,854
October 22	1:00 pm	Louisiana Tech	Romney Stadium; Logan, UT	ESPN+/ALT	L 17–24	16,037
November 5	10:00 pm	at Hawaiʻi	Aloha Stadium; Honolulu, HI	Oceanic PPV/ESPN3	W 35–31	30,301
November 12	1:00 pm	San Jose State	Romney Stadium; Logan, UT	KCSG/ESPN3	W 34–33	14,593
November 19	3:00 pm	at Idaho	Kibbie Dome; Moscow, ID	ESPN+/ALT	W 49–42 ^{2OT}	8,216
November 26	1:00 pm	Nevada	Romney Stadium; Logan, UT	KCSG/WSN	W 21–17	15,784
December 3	6:00 pm	at New Mexico State	Aggie Memorial Stadium; Las Cruces, NM	KCSG/ALT2/ESPN3	W 24–21	13,631
December 17	3:30 pm	vs. Ohio	Bronco Stadium; Boise, ID (Famous Idaho Potato Bowl)	ESPN	L 23–24	28,076
*Non-conference game; ^{†}Homecoming; Rankings from Coaches' Poll released prior to the game; All times are in Mountain time
