= 2011 New Mexico State Aggies football team =

American college football season

2011 New Mexico State Aggies football
- Conference: Western Athletic Conference
- Record: 4–9 (2–5 WAC)
- Head coach: DeWayne Walker (3rd season)
- Offensive coordinator: Doug Martin (1st season)
- Offensive scheme: Air raid
- Defensive coordinator: Dale Lindsey (1st season)
- Base defense: Multiple
- Home stadium: Aggie Memorial Stadium

2011 Western Athletic Conference football standings
	Conf.			Overall
Team	W		L	W		L
Louisiana Tech $	6	–	1	8	–	5
Nevada	5	–	2	7	–	6
Utah State	5	–	2	7	–	6
Hawaii	3	–	4	6	–	7
San Jose State	3	–	4	5	–	7
Fresno State	3	–	4	4	–	9
New Mexico State	2	–	5	4	–	9
Idaho	1	–	6	2	–	10
$ – Conference champion

The 2011 New Mexico State Aggies football team represented New Mexico State University as a member of the Western Athletic Conference (WAC) during the 2011 NCAA Division I FBS football season. Led by third-year head coach DeWayne Walker, the Aggies compiled an overall record of 4–9 with a mark of 2–5 in conference play, placing seventh in the WAC. New Mexico State played home games at Aggie Memorial Stadium in Las Cruces, New Mexico.

== Schedule ==
Date	Time	Opponent	Site	TV	Result	Attendance
September 3	6:00 pm	Ohio*	Aggie Memorial Stadium; Las Cruces, NM	ALT	L 24–44	14,728
September 10	1:30 pm	at Minnesota*	TCF Bank Stadium; Minneapolis, MN	BTN	W 28–21	48,807
September 17	6:00 pm	UTEP*	Aggie Memorial Stadium; Las Cruces, NM (Battle of I-10)	ALT	L 10–16	19,751
September 24	2:00 pm	at San Jose State	Spartan Stadium; San Jose, CA	ESPN3	L 24–34	13,456
October 1	5:00 pm	at New Mexico*	University Stadium; Albuquerque, NM (Rio Grande Rivalry)	The Mtn.	W 42–28	30,091
October 15	6:00 pm	Idaho	Aggie Memorial Stadium; Las Cruces, NM	ALT2	W 31–24	12,711
October 22	10:00 pm	at Hawaii	Aloha Stadium; Halawa, HI	Oceanic PPV	L 34–45	33,671
October 29	6:00 pm	Nevada^{†}	Aggie Memorial Stadium; Las Cruces, NM	WSN, ALT2	L 34–48	15,782
November 5	10:30 am	at Georgia*	Sanford Stadium; Athens, GA	CSS	L 16–63	92,746
November 12	6:00 pm	Fresno State	Aggie Memorial Stadium; Las Cruces, NM	WSN, ALT2	W 48–45	14,227
November 19	8:15 pm	at BYU*	LaVell Edwards Stadium; Provo, UT	ESPNU	L 7–42	57,134
November 26	2:00 pm	at Louisiana Tech	Joe Aillet Stadium; Ruston, LA	ALT2, CST	L 0–44	17,458
December 3	6:00 pm	Utah State	Aggie Memorial Stadium; Las Cruces, NM	ALT2, KCSG	L 21–24	13,631
*Non-conference game; ^{†}Homecoming; All times are in Mountain time
