= Ryan Allen (American football) =

American football player (born 1990)

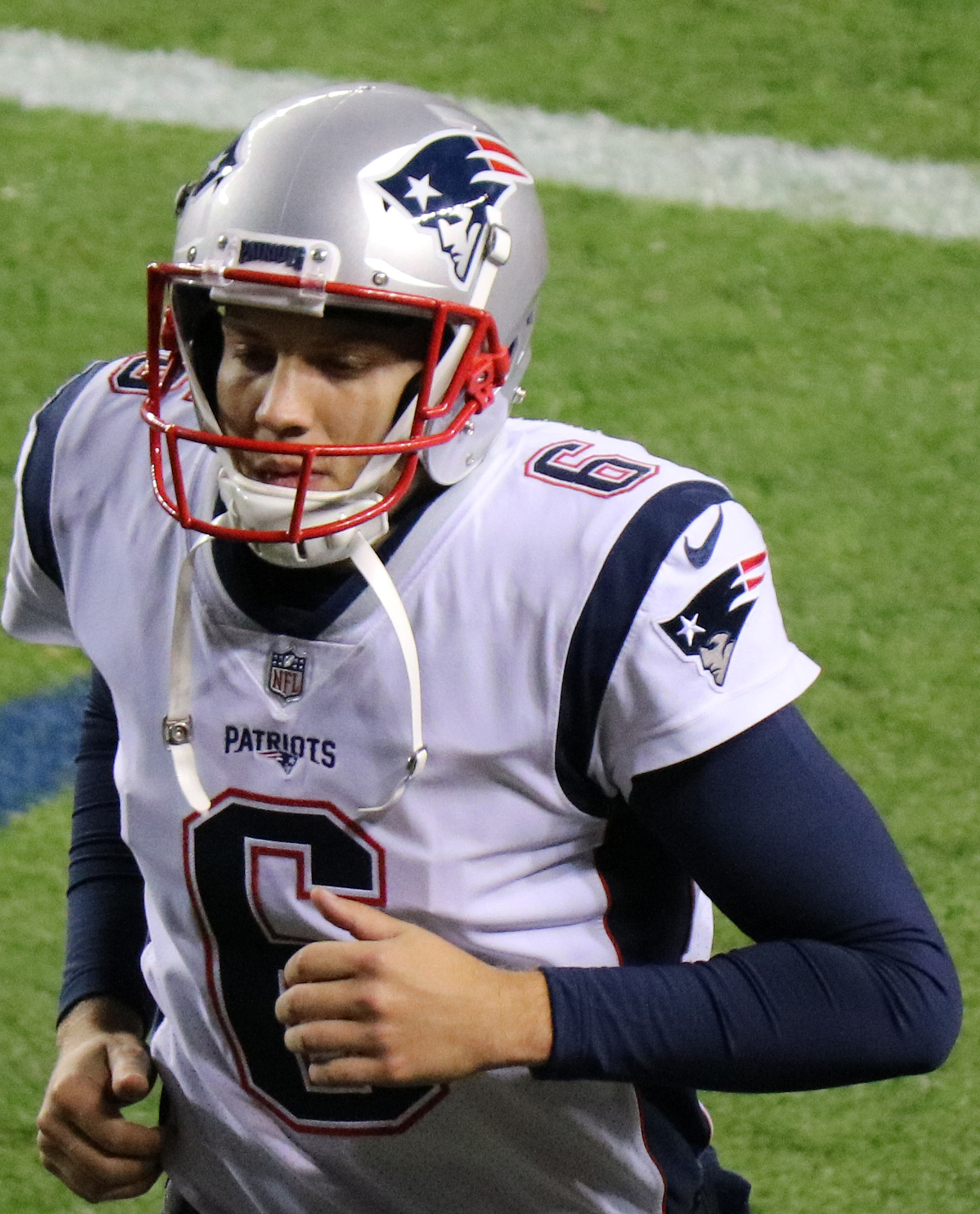
- Allen with the New England Patriots in 2017

Clemson Tigers
- Title: Special teams player development and specialist coach

Personal information
- Born: February 28, 1990 (age 36); Salem, Oregon, U.S.
- Listed height: 6 ft 2 in (1.88 m)
- Listed weight: 220 lb (100 kg)

Career information
- Position: Punter (No. 6, 9, 8)
- High school: West Salem
- College: Oregon State (2008–2009); Louisiana Tech (2010–2012)
- NFL draft: 2013: undrafted

Career history

Playing
- New England Patriots (2013–2018); Atlanta Falcons (2019); Tennessee Titans (2020); Indianapolis Colts (2020)

Coaching
- Clemson Tigers (2024–present) Special teams development and specialist coach

Awards and highlights
- 3× Super Bowl champion (XLIX, LI, LIII); New England Patriots All-2010s Team; New England Patriots All-Dynasty Team; 2× Ray Guy Award (2011, 2012); Unanimous All-American (2012); First-team All-American (2011); First-team All-WAC (2012); Second-team All-WAC (2011)

Career NFL statistics
- Punts: 451
- Punting yards: 20,378
- Punting average: 45.2
- Longest punt: 67
- Inside 20: 169
- Stats at Pro Football Reference

Ryan Allen (born February 28, 1990) is an American football coach and former punter who is a special teams player development and specialist coach for the Clemson Tigers. He played seven seasons in the National Football League (NFL). He is best known for being the starting punter for the New England Patriots for six seasons, during which he won three Super Bowls and was their longest serving starting punter of the Bill Belichick era. Allen played college football for the Oregon State Beavers and the Louisiana Tech Bulldogs. He won twice the Ray Guy Award in 2011 and 2012, and also was a unanimous All-American in 2012. Allen was signed by the Patriots as an undrafted free agent in 2013.

== Early life ==
Allen attended West Salem High School in Salem, Oregon, where he played on the football team for two years as a punter/kicker. In 2007, Allen was named to the all-state first team.

== College career ==
In 2008, Allen walked on at Oregon State along with fellow punter Johnny Hekker.

As a freshman, Allen was redshirted. He did not play in 2009 as he remained behind Hekker on the team's depth chart.

Allen then went to Louisiana Tech, and in 2010, he played in 12 games, averaging 40.8 yards on 60 punts with 21 landing inside the 20-yard line. Four of Allen's punts went over 50 yards, including a season-long punt of 66 yards.

In 2011, Allen punted 83 times and set a school record with a 46.3 yard average per punt. He ranked first in the nation with 39 punts inside the 20 yard line and had a season-long punt of 72 yards against Mississippi State. In the Poinsettia Bowl, Allen averaged 43.2 yards on five punts. He was named to the All-WAC first team and won the Ray Guy Award as the best college football punter.

Allen averaged 48.0 yards on 45 punts as a senior in 2012. He had 21 punts that were longer than 50 yards and 20 punts that were downed inside the 20 yard line. Allen had a career-long 85-yard punt against New Mexico State. He led the NCAA in punting yards per punt, was a unanimous All-American, and won the Ray Guy Award for the second time, the first punter to ever win back-to-back Ray Guy Awards.

== Professional career ==
Pre-draft measurables
Height	Weight	Arm length	Hand span
6 ft 1 1/2 in (1.87 m)	229 lb (104 kg)	32 1/2 in (0.83 m)	9 5/8 in (0.24 m)
All values from NFL Combine

=== New England Patriots ===
Two punters—Jeff Locke and Sam Martin—were selected in the 2013 NFL draft; Allen was not. He signed a standard three-year contract as an undrafted free agent with the New England Patriots on April 27, 2013. During training camp, Allen beat out veteran Zoltán Meskó, who was released at the final roster cutdown.

Allen was named the Week 14 AFC Special Teams Player of the Week for his contributions to the Patriots' victory over San Diego Chargers. In Super Bowl XLIX, Allen punted four times for 196 yards and set a then Super Bowl record with a 64-yard punt, helping the Patriots to a 28–24 victory over the Seattle Seahawks. On July 25, 2015, the Patriots signed Allen to a three-year contract extension; the NFL's Collective Bargaining Agreement allows undrafted rookies to sign extensions after two seasons. The new deal, which ran through the 2018 season, had $6.1 million in new money, including a $2 million signing bonus and $1 million in guaranteed salary in 2016.

In 2016, Allen was praised for his performance in the Patriots' Week 3 27–0 shutout victory over the Houston Texans. He punted seven times, averaging over 49 yards per punt; none of his punts were returned, and all of them left the Texans starting at or behind their own 20-yard line. Allen was named AFC Special Teams Player of the Week for his performance. On February 5, 2017, Allen was part of the Patriots team that won Super Bowl LI. In the game, Allen punted four times for 166 yards as the Patriots defeated the Atlanta Falcons by a score of 34–28 in overtime.

Allen made his third Super Bowl appearance the next season for the Patriots in Super Bowl LII; however, the Patriots lost to the Philadelphia Eagles 41–33, and Allen never punted during the game.

The next year, Allen's former college teammate Johnny Hekker broke his Super Bowl record for the Los Angeles Rams, though the Patriots would win that game 13–3 and give Allen his third Super Bowl championship.

On March 22, 2019, Allen re-signed with the Patriots on a one-year deal. However, on August 19, he was released in favor of rookie Jake Bailey, who was drafted by the Patriots in the fifth round of the 2019 NFL draft.

=== Atlanta Falcons ===
On November 4, 2019, Allen signed with the Atlanta Falcons, making him the team's fifth punter of the season. He was released on November 29 when Matt Bosher was activated off injured reserve. However, Allen was re-signed on December 7 following an injury to Bosher. Despite playing only half a season in 2019, and having a career low in yards per punt, Allen had arguably his most accurate season in the NFL, pinning exactly half of his punts (14 out of 28) inside the 20.

On February 18, 2020, Allen signed a one-year contract extension with the Falcons. On August 2, he was released by the Falcons.

=== Tennessee Titans ===
On November 7, 2020, Allen was signed by the Tennessee Titans. He was waived on November 17, and signed to the team's practice squad two days later. He was released from the practice squad on November 24.

=== Indianapolis Colts ===
On December 3, 2020, Allen signed with the practice squad of the Indianapolis Colts. He was elevated to the active roster on December 5 and 12 for the team's Weeks 13 and 14 games against the Houston Texans and Las Vegas Raiders, and reverted to the practice squad after each game. Allen was released on December 21.

== Coaching career ==
In 2024, Allen was hired as a special teams development and specialist coach for the Clemson Tigers.

== NFL career statistics ==
Legend
	Won the Super Bowl
**Bold**	Career high

Regular season statistics
Year	Team	GP	Punting				
Year	Team	GP	Punts	Yds	Avg	Lng	Blk
2013	NE	**16**	66	**3,491**	45.9	65	0
2014	NE	**16**	66	3,060	46.4	**67**	**1**
2015	NE	**16**	**73**	3,358	46.0	**67**	**1**
2016	NE	**16**	72	3,217	44.7	57	0
2017	NE	**16**	58	2,515	43.4	60	0
2018	NE	**16**	64	2,885	45.1	66	0
2019	ATL	8	28	1,172	41.9	59	0
2020	TEN	1	8	404	**50.5**	65	0
2020	IND	2	6	276	46.0	51	0
Career		107	451	20,378	45.2	67	2

Postseason statistics
Year	Team	GP	Punting				
Year	Team	GP	Punts	Yds	Avg	Lng	Blk
2013	NE	2	4	202	**50.5**	60	0
2014	NE	**3**	**12**	493	41.1	**64**	0
2015	NE	2	9	407	45.2	55	0
2016	NE	**3**	**12**	**503**	41.9	58	0
2017	NE	**3**	10	419	41.9	57	0
2018	NE	**3**	11	463	42.1	53	0
Career		16	58	2,487	42.9	64	0

== Personal life ==
Allen was born in Salem, Oregon, on February 28, 1990. His parents are Mike and Sherry Allen, and he has one sister, Jessica. Allen was a business major at Louisiana Tech.
