= 2011 Idaho Vandals football team =

American college football season

2011 Idaho Vandals football
- Conference: Western Athletic Conference
- Record: 2–10 (1–6 WAC)
- Head coach: Robb Akey (5th season)
- Offensive coordinator: Steve Axman (5th season)
- Offensive scheme: Spread
- Defensive coordinator: Mark Criner (5th season)
- Base defense: 4–3
- Home stadium: Kibbie Dome

2011 Western Athletic Conference football standings
	Conf.			Overall
Team	W		L	W		L
Louisiana Tech $	6	–	1	8	–	5
Nevada	5	–	2	7	–	6
Utah State	5	–	2	7	–	6
Hawaii	3	–	4	6	–	7
San Jose State	3	–	4	5	–	7
Fresno State	3	–	4	4	–	9
New Mexico State	2	–	5	4	–	9
Idaho	1	–	6	2	–	10
$ – Conference champion

The 2011 Idaho Vandals football team represented the University of Idaho as a member of the Western Athletic Conference (WAC) in the 2011 NCAA Division I FBS football season. The Vandals were led by fifth-year head coach Robb Akey and played their home games at the Kibbie Dome. They finished the season 2–10 overall and 1–6 in WAC play to place last out of eight teams.

== Schedule ==
Date	Time	Opponent	Site	TV	Result	Attendance	Source
September 1	6:00 pm	Bowling Green*	Kibbie Dome; Moscow, ID	ALT	L 15–32	12,173	
September 10	2:00 pm	North Dakota*	Kibbie Dome; Moscow, ID	SWX	W 44–14	10,608	
September 17	4:00 pm	at No. 9 Texas A&M*	Kyle Field; College Station, TX	FSN PPV	L 7–37	86,623	
September 24	2:00 pm	Fresno State	Kibbie Dome; Moscow, ID	WSN/ALT2	L 24–48	15,110	
October 1	12:30 pm	at Virginia*	Scott Stadium; Charlottesville, VA	ESPN3	L 20–21 ^{OT}	39,827	
October 8	2:00 pm	Louisiana Tech^{†}	Kibbie Dome; Moscow, ID		L 11–24	15,309	
October 15	5:00 pm	at New Mexico State	Aggie Memorial Stadium; Las Cruces, NM	ALT2	L 24–31	12,711	
October 29	2:00 pm	Hawaiʻi	Kibbie Dome; Moscow, ID	ALT/ESPN Plus	L 14–16	10,461	
November 5	1:00 pm	at San Jose State	Spartan Stadium; San Jose, CA	WSN/ALT2	W 32–29	10,621	
November 12	6:15 pm	at BYU*	LaVell Edwards Stadium; Provo, UT	ESPN2	L 7–42	57,770	
November 19	2:00 pm	Utah State	Kibbie Dome; Moscow, ID	ALT/ESPN Plus	L 42–49 ^{2OT}	8,216	
December 3	1:00 pm	at Nevada	Mackay Stadium; Reno, NV	WSN/ALT	L 3–56	10,027	
*Non-conference game; ^{†}Homecoming; Rankings from AP Poll released prior to the game; All times are in Pacific time

== NFL draft ==
One Vandal was selected in the 2012 NFL draft:

Player	Position	Round	Overall	Franchise
Korey Toomer	LB	5th	154	Seattle Seahawks
