= 2011 Hawaii Warriors football team =

American college football season

2011 Hawaii Warriors football
- Conference: Western Athletic Conference
- Record: 6–7 (3–4 WAC)
- Head coach: Greg McMackin (4th season)
- Offensive coordinator: Nick Rolovich (2nd season)
- Offensive scheme: Run and shoot, pistol
- Defensive coordinator: Dave Aranda (2nd season)
- Base defense: 4–3
- Home stadium: Aloha Stadium

2011 Western Athletic Conference football standings
	Conf.			Overall
Team	W		L	W		L
Louisiana Tech $	6	–	1	8	–	5
Nevada	5	–	2	7	–	6
Utah State	5	–	2	7	–	6
Hawaii	3	–	4	6	–	7
San Jose State	3	–	4	5	–	7
Fresno State	3	–	4	4	–	9
New Mexico State	2	–	5	4	–	9
Idaho	1	–	6	2	–	10
$ – Conference champion

The 2011 Hawaii Warriors football team represented the University of Hawaii at Manoa in the 2011 NCAA Division I FBS football season. The Warriors were led by fourth-year head coach Greg McMackin and played their home games at Aloha Stadium. They were members of the Western Athletic Conference. They finished the season 6–7, and 3–4 in WAC play to finish in a three-way tie for fourth place. Head coach Greg McMackin resigned at the end of the season due to mounting backlash from boosters and fans.

This was the Warriors last year as a member of the WAC as their football program joined the Mountain West Conference for the 2012 season.

== Schedule ==
Date	Time	Opponent	Site	TV	Result	Attendance
September 3	4:15 pm	Colorado*	Aloha Stadium; Honolulu, HI	ESPN2	W 34–17	37,001
September 10	9:30 am	at Washington*	Husky Stadium; Seattle, WA	RTNW/FCS Atlantic	L 32–40	63,252
September 17	4:00 pm	at UNLV*	Sam Boyd Stadium; Whitney, NV	The Mtn.	L 20–40	21,248
September 24	6:00 pm	(FCS) UC Davis*	Aloha Stadium; Honolulu, HI	Oceanic PPV/ESPN3	W 56–14	30,756
October 1	1:00 pm	at Louisiana Tech	Joe Aillet Stadium; Ruston, LA	ALT2/ESPN+	W 44–26	25,212
October 14	3:00 pm	at San Jose State	Spartan Stadium; San Jose, CA (rivalry)	ESPN	L 27–28	24,643
October 22	6:00 pm	New Mexico State^{†}	Aloha Stadium; Honolulu, HI	Oceanic PPV/ESPN3	W 45–34	30,568
October 29	11:00 am	at Idaho	Kibbie Dome; Moscow, ID	ALT/ESPN+	W 16–14	10,461
November 5	6:00 pm	Utah State	Aloha Stadium; Honolulu, HI	Oceanic PPV/ESPN3	L 31–35	30,301
November 12	4:15 pm	at Nevada	Mackay Stadium; Reno, NV	ESPNU	L 28–42	16,527
November 19	6:00 pm	Fresno State	Aloha Stadium; Honolulu, HI (rivalry)	WSN/ALT2	L 21–24	28,907
November 26	6:00 pm	Tulane*	Aloha Stadium; Honolulu, HI	Oceanic PPV/ESPN3	W 35–23	27,411
December 3	2:30 pm	BYU*	Aloha Stadium; Honolulu, HI	ESPN2	L 20–41	34,446
*Non-conference game; ^{†}Homecoming; All times are in Hawaii time
