= 2011 Poinsettia Bowl =

2011 San Diego County Credit Union Poinsettia Bowl
TCU Horned Frogs	Louisiana Tech Bulldogs
(10–2)	(8–4)
Mountain West	WAC
31	24
Head coach: Gary Patterson	Head coach: Sonny Dykes
AP / Coaches / BCS; 16 / 15 / 18
	1	2	3	4	Total
TCU	0	10	7	14	31
Louisiana Tech	3	7	14	0	24
- Date: December 21, 2011
- Season: 2011
- Stadium: Qualcomm Stadium
- Location: San Diego, California
- Favorite: Texas Christian by 11
- Referee: Todd Geerlings (Big Ten)
- Halftime show: Both schools' marching bands, fireworks
- Attendance: 24,607
- Payout: US$750,000 per team

United States TV coverage
- Network: ESPN
- Announcers: Joe Tessitore (Play-by-Play); Lou Holtz and Mark May (Analysts); Samantha Steele (Sidelines)
- Nielsen ratings: 2.1

The 2011 San Diego County Credit Union Poinsettia Bowl, the seventh edition of the game, was a post-season American college football bowl game, held on December 21, 2011 at Qualcomm Stadium in San Diego, California as part of the 2011–12 NCAA Bowl season.

The game was played at 5:00 p.m. PT on ESPN, and featured the Louisiana Tech Bulldogs from the Western Athletic Conference (WAC) versus the TCU Horned Frogs from the Mountain West Conference.

Louisiana Tech accepted a bid to compete in the 2011 edition of the game on November 26, while TCU accepted a bid to compete on December 4.

The TCU Horned Frogs defeated the Louisiana Tech Bulldogs by a final score of 31–24.

== Teams ==
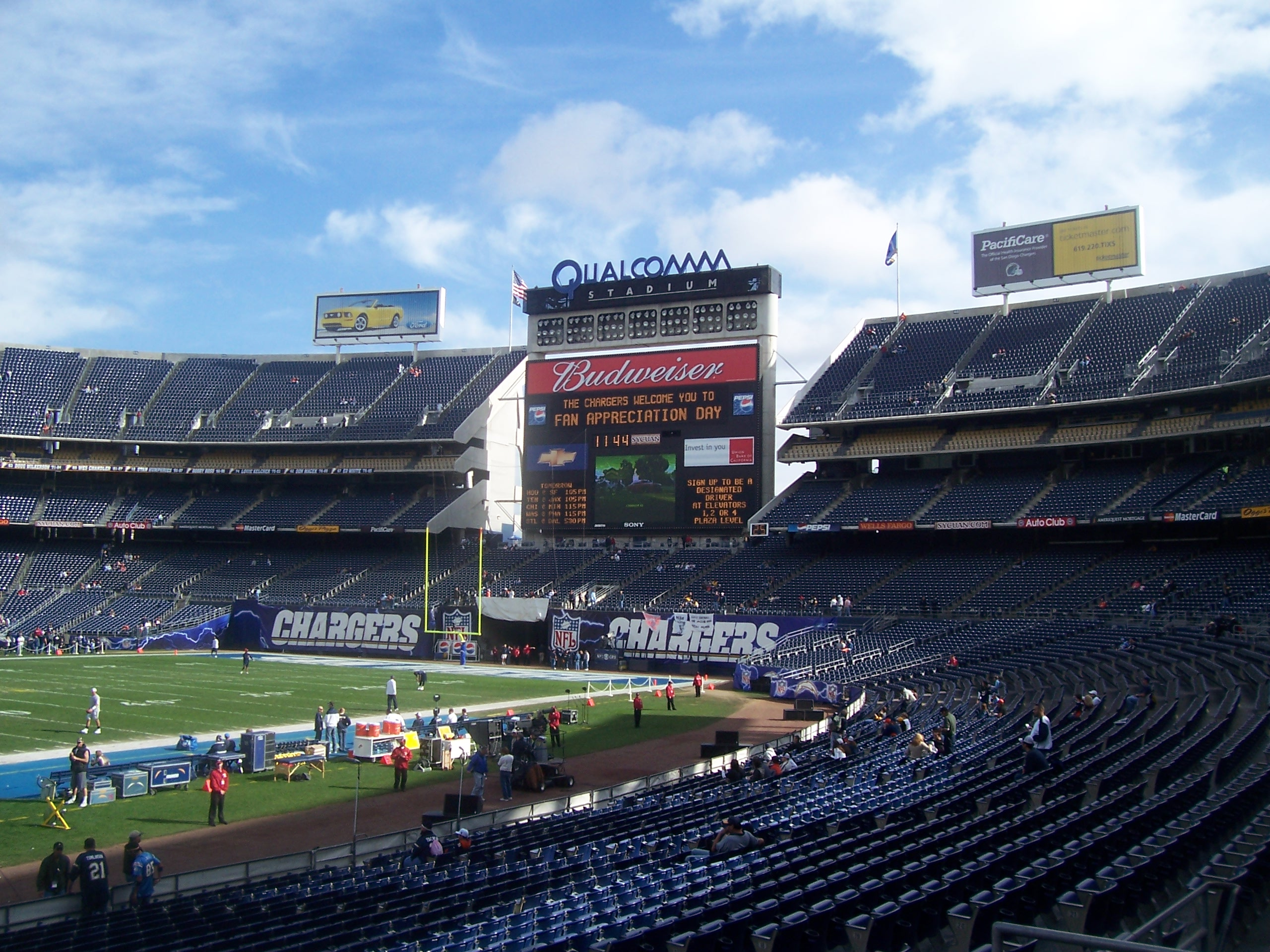
The 2011 Poinsettia Bowl was played at Qualcomm Stadium.

=== TCU ===
On December 4, 2011, the TCU Horned Frogs accepted an invite to represent the MWC. The Horned Frogs entered the bowl with a record of 10–2 and were the 2011 Mountain West Conference champions. This marked the third appearance in this bowl game for the Horned Frogs and their seventh straight bowl appearance. TCU came into the game averaging 210.2 yards on the ground.

=== Louisiana Tech ===
On November 26, 2011, the Louisiana Tech Bulldogs accepted an invite to represent the WAC. The Bulldogs entered the bowl with a record of 8–4 and were the 2011 WAC champions. The team also entered the game on a 7-game winning streak and were allowing only 122.2 rushing yards per game. This marked the first appearance in a bowl game for Louisiana Tech since the 2008 Independence Bowl.

== Game summary ==
In the 1st half, the Bulldogs out gained TCU 288 yards to 139 yards. However, TCU forced two turnovers to keep it tied 10–10 at the end of the half. Louisiana Tech scored first on a 23-yard field goal from Matt Nelson. TCU tied the game up in the 2nd quarter with a 25-yard field goal from Ross Evans. The Bulldogs responded on their next drive with a 2-yard touchdown pass from Colby Cameron to Quinton Patton to put Louisiana Tech up 10–3. With less than two minutes remaining in the 2nd quarter, Cameron threw an interception that was returned 24 yards to the Louisiana Tech's 25-yard line. Taking advantage of the turnover, the Horned Frogs tied the game 10–10 with 26 seconds left in the 1st half on a 7-yard Ed Wesley touchdown run.

On its first possession of the 3rd quarter, TCU took a 17–10 lead on a 1-yard Matthew Tucker rushing touchdown. On their next possession, Louisiana Tech recovered a TCU muffed punt at TCU's 12-yard line. The Bulldogs took advantage of the turnover and tied the game 17–17 on a 2-yard Hunter Lee touchdown run. After trading punts, TCU's Casey Pachall threw an interception with 3:35 remaining in the 3rd quarter. Colby Cameron capitalized on the interception by throwing a 61-yard touchdown pass to Myles White to give Louisiana Tech a 24–17 lead.

On the next drive, TCU went on an 18 play, 72-yard drive that took 9 minutes and 21 seconds. The drive involved two 4th down conversions and a defensive pass interference call in the end zone on a 3rd-and-goal play to give TCU a 1st down at the 2-yard line. The long drive was capped off with a 1-yard Luke Shivers touchdown run to tie the game 24–24 with 7:49 left in the game. After forcing the Bulldogs to punt, TCU took a 31–24 lead on a 42-yard touchdown pass to Skye Dawson. After forcing Louisiana Tech to punt again with 3:33 left on the clock, TCU was able to close out the game to preserve the victory.

With the win, TCU coach Gary Patterson picked up his 109th victory, tying Dutch Meyer for the most wins in TCU history.

=== Scoring summary ===
Source.

Scoring summary

Quarter	Time	Drive			Team	Scoring information	Score	
Quarter	Time	Plays	Yards	TOP	Team	Scoring information	TCU	La. Tech
1	8:30	13	67	3:33	La. Tech	23-yard field goal by Matt Nelson	0	3
2	14:11	8	57	3:22	TCU	25-yard field goal by Ross Evans	3	3
2	11:37	7	59	2:34	La. Tech	Quinton Patton 2-yard touchdown reception from Colby Cameron, Matt Nelson kick good	3	10
2	0:26	4	25	0:55	TCU	Ed Wesley 7-yard touchdown run, Ross Evans kick good	10	10
3	9:54	11	55	5:06	TCU	Matthew Tucker 1-yard touchdown run, Ross Evans kick good	17	10
3	7:18	3	12	0:52	La. Tech	Hunter Lee 2-yard touchdown run, Matt Nelson kick good	17	17
3	2:10	3	61	0:17	La. Tech	Myles White 61-yard touchdown reception from Colby Cameron, Matt Nelson kick good	17	24
4	7:49	18	72	9:21	TCU	Luke Shivers 1-yard touchdown run, Ross Evans kick good	24	24
4	4:26	5	69	1:58	TCU	Skye Dawson 42-yard touchdown reception from Casey Pachall, Ross Evans kick good	31	24
"TOP" = time of possession. For other American football terms, see Glossary of American football.							31	24

=== Statistics ===
	1	2	3	4	Total
Horned Frogs	0	10	7	14	31
Bulldogs	3	7	14	0	24

Statistics	TCU	La. Tech
First downs	22	19
Rushes-yards (net)	190	96
Passing yards (net)	206	264
Passes, Comp-Att-Int	15–29–1	21–43–1
Total offense, plays – yards	80–396	70–360
Time of Possession	36:18	23:32

Team	Category	Player	Statistics
TCU	Passing	Casey Pachall	15/29, 206 yds, 1 TD, 1 INT
TCU	Rushing	Ed Wesley	16 car, 77 yds, 1 TD
TCU	Receiving	Skye Dawson	4 rec, 85 yds, 1 TD
La. Tech	Passing	Colby Cameron	21/43, 264 yds, 2 TD, 1 INT
La. Tech	Rushing	Hunter Lee	20 car, 64 yds, 1 TD
La. Tech	Receiving	Myles White	7 rec, 110 yds, 1 TD
