= Matt Broha =

American football player (born 1989)

No. 54
- Position: Defensive end

Personal information
- Born: June 6, 1989 (age 37); Baton Rouge, Louisiana, U.S.
- Listed height: 6 ft 4 in (1.93 m)
- Listed weight: 255 lb (116 kg)

Career information
- High school: Baton Rouge (LA) Catholic
- College: Louisiana Tech
- NFL draft: 2012: undrafted

Career history
- New York Giants (2012−2013)*
- * Offseason or practice squad member only

Awards and highlights
- First-team All-WAC (2011)
- Stats at Pro Football Reference

Matthew Kent Broha (born June 6, 1989) is an American former football defensive end. He signed with the New York Giants as an undrafted free agent. He played defensive end at Louisiana Tech.
