= Myles White =

American gridiron football player and coach (born 1990)

South Florida Bulls
- Title: Wide receivers coach

Personal information
- Born: March 30, 1990 (age 36); Tacoma, Washington, U.S.
- Listed height: 6 ft 0 in (1.83 m)
- Listed weight: 190 lb (86 kg)

Career information
- High school: Adlai E. Stevenson (Livonia, Michigan)
- College: Louisiana Tech
- NFL draft: 2013: undrafted

Career history

Playing
- Green Bay Packers (2013–2014); New York Giants (2015); New York Jets (2016)*; Tampa Bay Buccaneers (2016)*; New York Jets (2017)*; Winnipeg Blue Bombers (2017–2018)*; Toronto Argonauts (2018)
- * Offseason or practice squad member only

Coaching
- SMU (2019–2020) Offensive quality control coach; Stephen F. Austin (2021) Wide receivers coach; Miami (OH) (2022–2023) Wide receivers coach; Green Bay Packers (2024) Coaching assistant; Syracuse (2025) Passing game coordinator/wide receivers coach; South Florida (2026–present) Wide Receivers coach

Awards and highlights
- Second-team All-WAC (2012)

Career NFL statistics
- Receptions: 16
- Receiving yards: 154
- Receiving touchdowns: 1
- Stats at Pro Football Reference
- Stats at CFL.ca

Myles Howard White (born March 30, 1990) is an American football coach who most recently served as the pass game coordinator and wide receivers coach for Syracuse. He played college football at Louisiana Tech. White was signed by the Green Bay Packers as an undrafted free agent in 2013. He was also a member of the New York Giants, New York Jets, Tampa Bay Buccaneers, Winnipeg Blue Bombers and Toronto Argonauts.

== Professional career ==
Pre-draft measurables
| Height | Weight | 40-yard dash | 10-yard split | 20-yard split | 20-yard shuttle | Three-cone drill | Vertical jump | Broad jump | Bench press |
|---|---|---|---|---|---|---|---|---|---|
| 6 ft 0 in (1.83 m) | 182 lb (83 kg) | 4.42 s | 1.53 s | 2.55 s | 4.15 s | 6.90 s | 37.5 in (0.95 m) | 10 ft 1 in (3.07 m) | 11 reps |
All values are from Pro Day

=== Green Bay Packers ===
On September 7, 2015, White was released by the Packers to make room for the signing of wide receiver James Jones.

=== New York Giants ===
On September 9, 2015, White was signed by the New York Giants and was placed on the practice squad. On October 7, he was promoted to the Giants' active roster. White made 12 total appearances for the Giants, recording seven receptions for 88 yards and a touchdown.

On August 30, 2016, White was waived by the Giants as a part of the team's roster cuts.

=== New York Jets ===
The New York Jets signed White to their practice squad on September 4, 2016. On September 12, he was released from the Jets' practice squad. White was re-signed to the practice squad on September 29, 2016. He was released by the Jets on October 26. White was re-signed to the practice squad on November 1, but was released on November 8.

=== Tampa Bay Buccaneers ===
On November 22, 2016, White was signed to the Tampa Bay Buccaneers' practice squad.

=== New York Jets (second stint) ===
On January 11, 2017, White signed a reserve/future contract with the New York Jets. He was waived by the Jets on September 1.

=== Winnipeg Blue Bombers ===
White was signed to the practice roster of the Winnipeg Blue Bombers on October 10, 2017. After spending the 2018 preseason with Winnipeg, White was released.

=== Toronto Argonauts ===
On June 30, 2018, White joined the practice roster of the Toronto Argonauts, where his twin brother cornerback Mitchell White played the previous season. The brothers did not have the chance to play during the 2018 season; Mitchell was lost early in the season with injury, while Myles was not promoted to the active roster until week 12. Myles played in 7 games, catching 14 passes for 109 yards and one touchdown.

== Coaching career ==
=== Syracuse ===
On February 25, 2025, it was reported that Syracuse would hire White as its wide receivers coach and passing game coordinator. On November 3, head coach Fran Brown announced that he fired White after five straight losses in which the Orange failed to score more than 18 points.

=== NFL career statistics ===
Source: NFL.com

| Year | Team | G | GS | Receiving | | | | | Fumbles | |
| Year | Team | G | GS | Rec | Yds | Avg | Lng | TD | Fum | Lost |
Regular season
| 2013 | GB | 7 | 0 | 9 | 66 | 7.3 | 15 | 0 | 0 | 0 |
| 2015 | NYG | 12 | 0 | 7 | 88 | 12.6 | 28 | 1 | 0 | 0 |
| Total | | 19 | 0 | 16 | 154 | 9.6 | 28 | 1 | 0 | 0 |
