= 2011 Nevada Wolf Pack football team =

American college football season

2011 Nevada Wolf Pack football

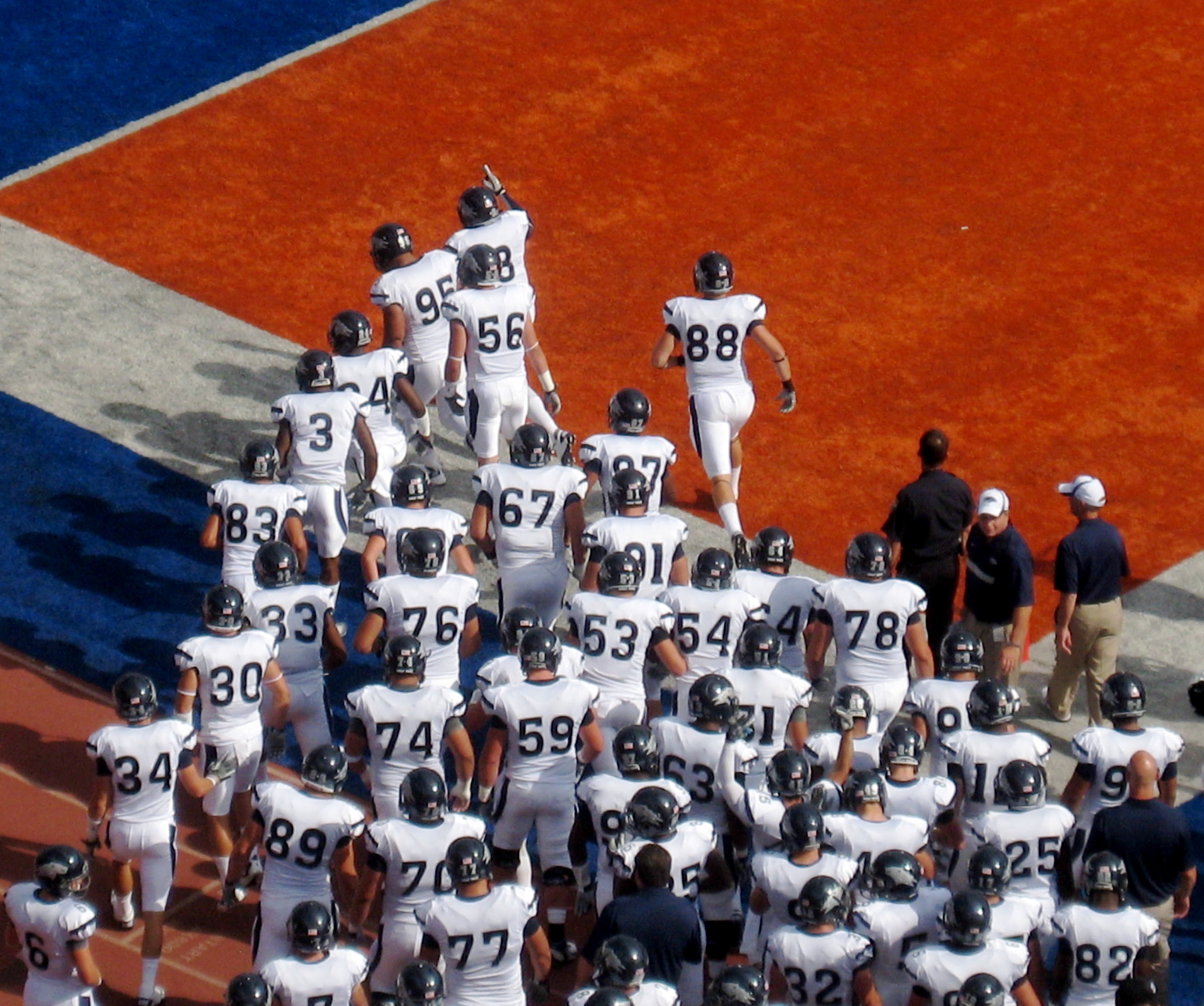
- Nevada taking the field vs. Boise State on October 1 at Bronco Stadium

Hawaii Bowl, L 17–24 vs. Southern Miss
- Conference: Western Athletic Conference
- Record: 7–6 (5–2 WAC)
- Head coach: Chris Ault (27th season)
- Offensive scheme: Pistol
- Defensive coordinator: Andy Buh (2nd season)
- Base defense: 4–3
- Home stadium: Mackay Stadium

2011 Western Athletic Conference football standings
	Conf.			Overall
Team	W		L	W		L
Louisiana Tech $	6	–	1	8	–	5
Nevada	5	–	2	7	–	6
Utah State	5	–	2	7	–	6
Hawaii	3	–	4	6	–	7
San Jose State	3	–	4	5	–	7
Fresno State	3	–	4	4	–	9
New Mexico State	2	–	5	4	–	9
Idaho	1	–	6	2	–	10
$ – Conference champion

The 2011 Nevada Wolf Pack football team represented the University of Nevada, Reno in the 2011 NCAA Division I FBS football season. The Wolf Pack were led by Chris Ault in his 27th overall and 8th straight season since taking over as head coach for the third time in 2004. They played their home games at Mackay Stadium and were members of the Western Athletic Conference (WAC). They finished the season 7–6 and 5–2 in WAC play to finish in a tie for second place. They were invited to their seventh straight bowl game, the Hawaii Bowl, where they lost to Southern Miss by 17 to 24.

This was the Wolf Pack's last year as a member of the WAC as they joined the Mountain West Conference for the 2012 season.

== Schedule ==
Date	Time	Opponent	Site	TV	Result	Attendance
September 10	12:30 p.m.	at No. 13 Oregon*	Autzen Stadium; Eugene, OR	FX	L 20–69	58,818
September 17	1:00 p.m.	at San Jose State	Spartan Stadium; San Jose, CA	KAME-TV/WSN/ALT	W 17–14	17,238
September 24	4:00 p.m.	at Texas Tech*	Jones AT&T Stadium; Lubbock, TX	FCS Central	L 34–35	55,664
October 1	11:30 a.m.	at No. 4 Boise State*	Bronco Stadium; Boise, ID (rivalry)	Versus	L 10–30	34,098
October 8	4:00 p.m.	UNLV*	Mackay Stadium; Reno, NV (Fremont Cannon)	Cox/ESPN3	W 37–0	25,978
October 15	1:00 p.m.	New Mexico*^{†}	Mackay Stadium; Reno, NV		W 49–7	15,369
October 22	1:00 p.m.	Fresno State	Mackay Stadium; Reno, NV	WSN	W 45–38	15,113
October 29	5:00 p.m.	at New Mexico State	Aggie Memorial Stadium; Las Cruces, NM	KAME-TV/WSN/ALT2/AV	W 48–34	15,782
November 12	7:15 p.m.	Hawaii	Mackay Stadium; Reno, NV	ESPNU	W 42–28	16,527
November 19	1:00 p.m.	Louisiana Tech	Mackay Stadium; Reno, NV		L 20–24	11,639
November 26	11:00 a.m.	at Utah State	Romney Stadium; Logan, UT	WSN	L 17–21	15,784
December 3	1:00 p.m.	Idaho	Mackay Stadium; Reno, NV	WSN/ALT	W 56–3	10,027
December 24	5:00 p.m.	vs. No. 22 Southern Miss*	Aloha Stadium; Halawa, HI (Hawaii Bowl)	ESPN	L 17–24	32,630
*Non-conference game; ^{†}Homecoming; Rankings from AP Poll released prior to the game; All times are in Pacific time

== Game summaries ==
=== At Oregon ===
Nevada at Oregon

Team	1	2	3	4	Total
Wolf Pack	0	7	6	7	20
• No. 13 Ducks	13	28	14	14	69

- Date: September 10, 2011
- Location: Autzen Stadium
  Eugene, OR
- Game start: 12:41 p.m. PDT
- Elapsed time: 3 hours and 20 minutes
- Game attendance: 58,818
- Game weather: Temperature: 84 °F (29 °C) • Weather: Sunny • Wind: NNE 8 MPH
- Referee: Michael Batlan
- TV announcers (FX): Gus Johnson (play–by–play), Charles Davis (analyst) and Tim Brewster (sideline)

Scoring summary
1	11:17	ORE	LaMichael James 4–yard run (Dion Jordan rush failed) (11 plays, 79 yards, 3:43)	ORE 6–0
1	01:56	ORE	Lavasier Tuinei 3–yard pass from Darron Thomas (Alejandro Maldonado kick) (6 plays, 80 yards, 2:18)	ORE 13–0
2	14:36	ORE	LaMichael James 44–yard pass from Darron Thomas (Alejandro Maldonado kick) (1 play, 44 yards, 0:08)	ORE 20–0
2	09:57	ORE	Rahsaan Vaughn 25–yard pass from Darron Thomas (Alejandro Maldonado kick) (4 plays, 60 yards, 1:00)	ORE 27–0
2	05:43	ORE	Colt Lyerla 20–yard pass from Darron Thomas (Alejandro Maldonado kick) (4 plays, 86 yards, 1:11)	ORE 34–0
2	01:52	NEV	Mike Ball 5–yard pass from Tyler Lantrip (Anthony Martinez kick) (11 plays, 80 yards, 3:51)	ORE 34–7
2	00:13	ORE	De'Anthony Thomas 24–yard pass from Darron Thomas (Alejandro Maldonado kick) (11 plays, 81 yards, 1:39)	ORE 41–7
3	13:30	ORE	LaMichael James 58–yard punt return (Alejandro Maldonado kick)	ORE 48–7
3	08:38	NEV	Stefphon Jefferson 1–yard run (Anthony Martinez kick failed) (13 plays, 89 yards, 4:52)	ORE 48–13
3	07:25	ORE	De'Anthony Thomas 69–yard pass from Darron Thomas (Alejandro Maldonado kick) (3 plays, 72 yards, 1:13)	ORE 55–13
4	07:26	NEV	Cody Fajardo 7–yard run (Anthony Martinez kick) (7 plays, 68 yards, 2:26)	ORE 55–20
4	02:24	ORE	Ayele Forde 26–yard run (Alejandro Maldonado kick) (4 plays, 27 yards, 1:32)	ORE 62–20
4	00:20	ORE	Boseko Lokombo 67–yard interception (Alejandro Maldonado kick)	ORE 69–20

Statistics	Nevada	Oregon
First downs	26	25
Total yards	516	603
Rushing yards	283	272
Passing yards	233	331
Turnovers	1	0
Time of possession	38:18	21:42

Team	Category	Player	Statistics
Nevada	Passing	Tyler Lantrip	21/35, 219 yards, 1 TD, 2 INTs
Nevada	Rushing	Mike Ball	14 carries, 99 yards
Nevada	Receiving	Rishard Matthews	8 receptions, 100 yards
Oregon	Passing	Darron Thomas	13/19, 295 yards, 6 TDs
Oregon	Rushing	De'Anthony Thomas	8 carries, 81 yards
Oregon	Receiving	De'Anthony Thomas	2 receptions, 93 yards, 2 TDs

=== At San Jose State ===
Nevada at San Jose State

Team	1	2	3	4	Total
• Wolf Pack	7	7	3	0	17
Spartans	7	0	0	7	14

- Date: September 17, 2011
- Location: Spartan Stadium
  San Jose, CA
- Game start: 1:07 p.m. PDT
- Elapsed time: 3 hours and 3 minutes
- Game attendance: 17,238
- Game weather: Temperature: 72 °F (22 °C) • Weather: Sunny and Clear • Wind: N/A
- Referee: Stacy Hardin
- TV announcers (KAME-TV/WSN/ALT): Barry Tompkins (play–by–play) and Joe Glenn (analyst)

Scoring summary
1	02:46	NEV	Mike Ball 4–yard run (Anthony Martinez kick) (11 plays, 77 yards, 4:57)	NEV 7–0
1	00:27	SJSU	Dasmen Stewart 28–yard run (Harrison Waid kick) (2 plays, 34 yards, 0:43)	TIE 7–7
2	08:48	NEV	Mike Ball 1–yard run (Anthony Martinez kick) (9 plays, 57 yards, 3:39)	NEV 14–7
3	04:27	NEV	Anthony Martinez 18–yard field goal (6 plays, 17 yards, 2:16)	NEV 17–7
4	07:59	SJSU	Brandon Rutley 1–yard run (Harrison Waid kick) (9 plays, 72 yards, 3:22)	NEV 17–14

Statistics	Nevada	San Jose State
First downs	23	15
Total yards	373	290
Rushing yards	261	138
Passing yards	112	152
Turnovers	5	6
Time of possession	35:51	24:09

Team	Category	Player	Statistics
Nevada	Passing	Tyler Lantrip	11/21, 112 yards, 2 INTs
Nevada	Rushing	Mike Ball	29 carries, 124 yards, 2 TDs
Nevada	Receiving	Rishard Matthews	7 receptions, 77 yards
San Jose State	Passing	Matt Faulkner	10/19, 131 yards, 1 INT
San Jose State	Rushing	Brandon Rutley	17 carries, 86 yards, 1 TD
San Jose State	Receiving	Chandler Jones	5 receptions, 36 yards

=== At Texas Tech ===
Nevada at Texas Tech

Team	1	2	3	4	Total
Wolf Pack	0	14	14	6	34
• Red Raiders	0	7	14	14	35

- Date: September 24, 2011
- Location: Jones AT&T Stadium
  Lubbock, TX
- Game start: 6:00 p.m. CDT
- Elapsed time: 3 hours and 22 minutes
- Game attendance: 55,664
- Game weather: Temperature: 93 °F (34 °C) • Weather: Clear • Wind: W 13 MPH
- Referee: Robert Cameron
- TV announcers (FCS Central): Tom Helmer (play–by–play), Yogi Roth (analyst) and Desmond Purnell (sideline)

Scoring summary
2	09:32	TTU	Eric Ward 2–yard pass from Seth Doege (Donnie Carona kick) (12 plays, 80 yards, 4:46)	TTU 7–0
2	05:18	NEV	Cody Fajardo 6–yard run (Anthony Martinez kick) (9 plays, 83 yards, 4:14)	TIE 7–7
2	00:35	NEV	Kolby Arendse 16–yard pass from Cody Fajardo (Anthony Martinez kick) (7 plays, 91 yards, 3:35)	NEV 14–7
3	11:39	NEV	Rishard Matthews 2–yard pass from Tyler Lantrip (Anthony Martinez kick) (7 plays, 80 yards, 3:21)	NEV 21–7
3	08:22	TTU	Eric Stephens 10–yard run (Donnie Carona kick) (9 plays, 69 yards, 3:17)	NEV 21–14
3	05:29	NEV	Cody Fajardo 56–yard run (Anthony Martinez kick) (1 play, 51 yards, 0:10)	NEV 28–14
3	04:12	TTU	Jace Amaro 8–yard pass from Seth Doege (Donnie Carona kick) (3 plays, 63 yards, 1:17)	NEV 28–21
4	13:00	NEV	Anthony Martinez 25–yard field goal (11 plays, 63 yards, 6:12)	NEV 31–21
4	09:39	TTU	Eric Stephens 1–yard run (Donnie Carona kick) (10 plays, 63 yards, 3:21)	NEV 31–28
4	04:49	NEV	Anthony Martinez 21–yard field goal (11 plays, 79 yards, 4:50)	NEV 34–28
4	00:36	TTU	Eric Ward 4–yard pass from Seth Doege (Donnie Carona kick) (9 plays, 56 yards, 4:13)	TTU 35–34

Statistics	Nevada	Texas Tech
First downs	26	24
Total yards	562	441
Rushing yards	312	219
Passing yards	250	222
Turnovers	1	1
Time of possession	32:34	27:26

Team	Category	Player	Statistics
Nevada	Passing	Tyler Lantrip	11/18, 191 yards, 1 TD
Nevada	Rushing	Mike Ball	27 carries, 139 yards
Nevada	Receiving	Rishard Matthews	5 receptions, 107 yards, 1 TD
Texas Tech	Passing	Seth Doege	26/38, 222 yards, 3 TDs
Texas Tech	Rushing	Eric Stephens	26 carries, 134 yards, 2 TDs
Texas Tech	Receiving	Jacoby Franks	5 receptions, 54 yards

=== At Boise State ===
Nevada at Boise State
(rivalry)

Team	1	2	3	4	Total
Wolf Pack	0	0	0	10	10
• No. 4 Broncos	7	13	10	0	30

- Date: October 1, 2011
- Location: Bronco Stadium
  Boise, ID
- Game start: 12:38 p.m. MDT
- Elapsed time: 3 hours and 3 minutes
- Game attendance: 34,098
- Game weather: Temperature: 85 °F (29 °C) • Weather: Partly Cloudy • Wind: SSE 9 MPH
- Referee: Scott Novak
- TV announcers (Versus): Paul Burmeister (play–by–play), Shaun King (analyst) and Anthony Herron (sideline)

Scoring summary
1	07:37	BSU	D. J. Harper 21–yard pass from Kellen Moore (Dan Goodale kick) (7 plays, 57 yards, 3:27)	BSU 7–0
2	05:51	BSU	Matt Miller 3–yard pass from Kellen Moore (Dan Goodale kick) (9 plays, 56 yards, 3:59)	BSU 14–0
2	01:24	BSU	Doug Martin 5–yard run (rush failed) (6 plays, 25 yards, 2:41)	BSU 20–0
3	12:56	BSU	Doug Martin 43–yard run (Dan Goodale kick) (4 plays, 64 yards, 2:04)	BSU 27–0
3	08:23	BSU	Dan Goodale 31–yard field goal (6 plays, 25 yards, 2:23)	BSU 30–0
4	14:48	NEV	Allen Hardison 21–yard field goal (10 plays, 81 yards, 4:22)	BSU 30–3
4	00:46	NEV	Rishard Matthews 53–yard pass from Mason Magleby (Allen Hardison kick) (4 plays, 71 yards, 0:53)	BSU 30–10

Statistics	Nevada	Boise State
First downs	12	22
Total yards	182	329
Rushing yards	59	169
Passing yards	123	160
Turnovers	5	0
Time of possession	26:52	33:08

Team	Category	Player	Statistics
Nevada	Passing	Mason Magleby	4/4, 73 yards, 1 TD
Nevada	Rushing	Mike Ball	15 carries, 35 yards
Nevada	Receiving	Rishard Matthews	4 receptions, 84 yards, 1 TD
Boise State	Passing	Kellen Moore	19/33, 142 yards, 2 TDs, 2 INTs
Boise State	Rushing	Doug Martin	21 carries, 126 yards, 2 TDs
Boise State	Receiving	Mitch Burroughs	5 receptions, 34 yards

=== UNLV ===
UNLV at Nevada
(Battle for the Fremont Cannon)

Team	1	2	3	4	Total
Rebels	0	0	0	0	0
• Wolf Pack	3	17	3	14	37

- Date: October 8, 2011
- Location: Mackay Stadium
  Reno, NV
- Game start: 4:05 p.m. PDT
- Elapsed time: 3 hours and 4 minutes
- Game attendance: 25,978
- Game weather: Temperature: 71 °F (22 °C) • Weather: Clear and Sunny • Wind: E 2 to 3 MPH
- Referee: Eddy Shelton
- TV announcers (Cox/ESPN3): Tim Neverett (play–by–play) and Brant Boyer (analyst)

Scoring summary
1	02:11	NEV	Allen Hardison 29–yard field goal (14 plays, 68 yards, 5:34)	NEV 3–0
2	07:12	NEV	Rishard Matthews 90–yard pass from Tyler Lantrip (Allen Hardison kick) (1 play, 90 yards, 0:13)	NEV 10–0
2	01:35	NEV	Corbin Louks 34–yard pass from Tyler Lantrip (Allen Hardison kick) (8 plays, 65 yards, 3:37)	NEV 17–0
2	00:17	NEV	Allen Hardison 41–yard field goal (8 plays, 55 yards, 0:40)	NEV 20–0
3	03:11	NEV	Allen Hardison 22–yard field goal (14 plays, 70 yards, 4:55)	NEV 23–0
4	13:14	NEV	Shane Anderson 32–yard pass from Tyler Lantrip (Allen Hardison kick) (7 plays, 71 yards, 2:21)	NEV 30–0
4	04:33	NEV	Lampford Mark 4–yard run (Allen Hardison kick) (9 plays, 83 yards, 3:27)	NEV 37–0

Statistics	UNLV	Nevada
First downs	7	31
Total yards	110	699
Rushing yards	102	240
Passing yards	8	459
Turnovers	3	4
Time of possession	24:21	35:39

Team	Category	Player	Statistics
UNLV	Passing	Caleb Herring	1/14, 8 yards, 1 INT
UNLV	Rushing	Dionza Bradford	18 carries, 79 yards
UNLV	Receiving	Austin Harrington	1 reception, 8 yards
Nevada	Passing	Tyler Lantrip	18/29, 366 yards, 3 TDs, 1 INT
Nevada	Rushing	Stefphon Jefferson	17 carries, 100 yards
Nevada	Receiving	Rishard Matthews	10 receptions, 220 yards, 1 TD

=== New Mexico ===
New Mexico at Nevada
(Battle of the Wolves)

Team	1	2	3	4	Total
Lobos	0	0	0	7	7
• Wolf Pack	21	7	14	7	49

- Date: October 15, 2011
- Location: Mackay Stadium
  Reno, NV
- Game start: 1:05 p.m. PDT
- Elapsed time: 3 hours and 4 minutes
- Game attendance: 15,369
- Game weather: Temperature: 74 °F (23 °C) • Weather: Partly Cloudy • Wind: 2 to 3 MPH
- Referee: Robert Cameron
- TV announcers (None): None

Scoring summary
1	09:21	NEV	Lampford Mark 1–yard run (Allen Hardison kick) (6 plays, 37 yards, 2:04)	NEV 7–0
1	03:29	NEV	Stefphon Jefferson 11–yard run (Allen Hardison kick) (8 plays, 82 yards, 3:31)	NEV 14–0
1	00:28	NEV	Marlon Johnson 25–yard fumble recovery (Allen Hardison kick)	NEV 21–0
2	02:18	NEV	Cody Fajardo 2–yard run (Allen Hardison kick) (8 plays, 80 yards, 2:55)	NEV 28–0
3	10:33	NEV	Lampford Mark 4–yard run (Allen Hardison kick) (10 plays, 54 yards, 4:05)	NEV 35–0
3	03:34	NEV	Cody Fajardo 4–yard run (Allen Hardison kick) (14 plays, 69 yards, 5:34)	NEV 42–0
4	10:51	NEV	Lampford Mark 9–yard run (Allen Hardison kick) (8 plays, 66 yards, 3:30)	NEV 49–0
4	06:38	NM	Tarean Austin 17–yard run (James Aho kick) (9 plays, 63 yards, 4:09)	NEV 49–7

Statistics	New Mexico	Nevada
First downs	14	34
Total yards	257	598
Rushing yards	168	338
Passing yards	89	260
Turnovers	4	5
Time of possession	25:32	34:28

Team	Category	Player	Statistics
New Mexico	Passing	B.R. Holbrook	9/22, 62 yards, 1 INT
New Mexico	Rushing	Tarean Austin	3 carries, 41 yards, 1 TD
New Mexico	Receiving	Ty Kirk	6 receptions, 42 yards
Nevada	Passing	Cody Fajardo	20/25, 203 yards, 1 INT
Nevada	Rushing	Stefphon Jefferson	14 carries, 108 yards, 1 TD
Nevada	Receiving	Kolby Arendse	4 receptions, 53 yards

=== Fresno State ===
Fresno State at Nevada

Team	1	2	3	4	Total
Bulldogs	7	10	7	14	38
• Wolf Pack	13	10	7	15	45

- Date: October 22, 2011
- Location: Mackay Stadium
  Reno, NV
- Game start: 1:08 p.m. PDT
- Elapsed time: 3 hours and 10 minutes
- Game attendance: 15,113
- Game weather: Temperature: 68 °F (20 °C) • Weather: Sunny • Wind: Calm
- Referee: Bill Athan
- TV announcers (WSN): Barry Tompkins (play–by–play) and Joe Glenn (analyst)

Scoring summary
1	10:26	NEV	Allen Hardison 22–yard field goal (11 plays, 78 yards, 4:34)	NEV 3–0
1	07:57	NEV	Rishard Matthews 86–yard punt return (Allen Hardison kick)	NEV 10–0
1	06:40	FS	Robbie Rouse 65–yard run (Kevin Goessling kick) (3 plays, 73 yards, 1:11)	NEV 10–7
1	02:26	NEV	Allen Hardison 22–yard field goal (9 plays, 73 yards, 4:09)	NEV 13–7
2	11:19	FS	Jalen Saunders 8–yard pass from Derek Carr (Kevin Goessling kick) (15 plays, 75 yards, 6:01)	FS 14–13
2	07:32	NEV	Mike Ball 18–yard pass from Cody Fajardo (Allen Hardison kick) (9 plays, 80 yards, 3:41)	NEV 20–14
2	00:30	FS	Kevin Goessling 22–yard field goal (14 plays, 52 yards, 6:55)	NEV 20–17
2	00:00	NEV	Allen Hardison 48–yard field goal (5 plays, 47 yards, 0:25)	NEV 23–17
3	14:09	FS	Victor Dean 9–yard pass from Derek Carr (Kevin Goessling kick) (3 plays, 80 yards, 0:46)	FS 24–23
3	11:56	NEV	Bubba Boudreaux 0–yard fumble recovery (Allen Hardison kick)	NEV 30–24
4	06:47	NEV	Mike Ball 16–yard run (Allen Hardison kick) (11 plays, 85 yards, 4:18)	NEV 37–24
4	06:00	FS	Robbie Rouse 25–yard run (Kevin Goessling kick) (3 plays, 59 yards, 0:39)	NEV 37–31
4	02:15	NEV	Cody Fajardo 23–yard run (Kolby Arendse pass) (7 plays, 80 yards, 3:39)	NEV 45–31
4	01:06	FS	Rashad Evans 2–yard pass from Derek Carr (Kevin Goessling kick) (10 plays, 78 yards, 1:04)	NEV 45–38

Statistics	Fresno State	Nevada
First downs	25	29
Total yards	522	581
Rushing yards	207	268
Passing yards	315	313
Turnovers	4	1
Time of possession	27:16	32:44

Team	Category	Player	Statistics
Fresno State	Passing	Derek Carr	20/37, 315 yards, 3 TDs
Fresno State	Rushing	Robbie Rouse	25 carries, 172 yards, 2 TDs
Fresno State	Receiving	Devon Wylie	5 receptions, 108 yards
Nevada	Passing	Cody Fajardo	19/27, 313 yards, 1 TD
Nevada	Rushing	Mike Ball	26 carries, 198 yards, 1 TD
Nevada	Receiving	Rishard Matthews	7 receptions, 148 yards

=== At New Mexico State ===
Nevada at New Mexico State

Team	1	2	3	4	Total
• Wolf Pack	7	13	14	14	48
Aggies	6	21	0	7	34

- Date: October 29, 2011
- Location: Aggie Memorial Stadium
  Las Cruces, NM
- Game start: 6:07 p.m. MDT
- Elapsed time: 3 hours and 36 minutes
- Game attendance: 15,782
- Game weather: Temperature: 66 °F (19 °C) • Weather: Partly Cloudy • Wind: S 2 MPH
- Referee: Clair Gausman
- TV announcers (KAME-TV/WSN/ALT/AV): Barry Tompkins (play–by–play) and Joe Glenn (analyst) of KAME-TV, WSN and ALT and Glen Cerny (play–by–play) and Danny Knee (analyst) of AV

Scoring summary
1	10:30	NMSU	Taveon Rogers 30–yard pass from Matt Christian (Tyler Stampler kick failed) (12 plays, 78 yards, 4:30)	NMSU 6–0
1	01:11	NEV	Stefphon Jefferson 26–yard run (Allen Hardison kick) (5 plays, 67 yards, 2:11)	NEV 7–6
2	12:08	NMSU	Kenny Turner 2–yard run (Tyler Stampler kick) (6 plays, 67 yards, 2:30)	NMSU 13–7
2	08:44	NEV	Cody Fajardo 6–yard run (Allen Hardison kick) (8 plays, 67 yards, 3:17)	NEV 14–13
2	04:54	NMSU	Taveon Rogers 16–yard pass from Matt Christian (Tyler Stampler kick failed) (4 plays, 82 yards, 1:15)	NMSU 19–14
2	01:33	NEV	Cody Fajardo 1–yard run (Mike Ball rush failed) (9 plays, 66 yards, 3:14)	NEV 20–19
2	00:26	NMSU	Matt Christian 14–yard run (Kenny Turner pass) (6 plays, 74 yards, 1:02)	NMSU 27–20
3	10:59	NEV	Cody Fajardo 6–yard run (Allen Hardison kick) (9 plays, 67 yards, 3:54)	TIE 27–27
3	02:17	NEV	Cody Fajardo 8–yard run (Jake Hurst kick) (8 plays, 80 yards, 3:26)	NEV 34–27
4	14:03	NEV	Lampford Mark 80–yard run (Jake Hurst kick) (1 play, 80 yards, 0:11)	NEV 41–27
4	08:46	NMSU	Todd Lee 36–yard pass from Matt Christian (Tyler Stampler kick) (5 plays, 80 yards, 1:30)	NEV 41–34
4	08:15	NEV	Stefphon Jefferson 3–yard run (Jake Hurst kick) (2 plays, 88 yards, 0:25)	NEV 48–34

Statistics	Nevada	New Mexico State
First downs	29	23
Total yards	683	514
Rushing yards	374	48
Passing yards	309	466
Turnovers	3	0
Time of possession	32:39	27:21

Team	Category	Player	Statistics
Nevada	Passing	Cody Fajardo	19/29, 283 yards
Nevada	Rushing	Lampford Mark	8 carries, 185 yards, 1 TD
Nevada	Receiving	Shane Anderson	5 receptions, 94 yards
New Mexico State	Passing	Matt Christian	20/44, 432 yards, 3 TDs, 3 INTs
New Mexico State	Rushing	Matt Christian	13 carries, 35 yards, 1 TD
New Mexico State	Receiving	Taveon Rogers	7 receptions, 203 yards, 2 TDs

=== Hawaii ===
Hawaii at Nevada

Team	1	2	3	4	Total
Warriors	3	11	7	7	28
• Wolf Pack	7	14	7	14	42

- Date: November 12, 2011
- Location: Mackay Stadium
  Reno, NV
- Game start: 7:19 p.m. PST
- Elapsed time: 3 hours and 27 minutes
- Game attendance: 16,527
- Game weather: Temperature: 46 °F (8 °C) • Weather: Cool • Wind: NNE 10 MPH
- Referee: Jim Farmer
- TV announcers (ESPNU): Adam Amin (play–by–play) and David Diaz-Infante (analyst)

Scoring summary
1	12:54	UH	Kenton Chun 35–yard field goal (6 plays, 33 yards, 2:06)	UH 3–0
1	01:18	NEV	Lampford Mark 4–yard run (Jake Hurst kick) (9 plays, 81 yards, 3:44)	NEV 7–3
2	10:54	NEV	Rishard Matthews 13–yard pass from Cody Fajardo (Jake Hurst kick) (11 plays, 84 yards, 3:57)	NEV 14–3
2	02:30	UH	Tyler Hadden 38–yard field goal (5 plays, 21 yards, 1:10)	NEV 14–6
2	01:27	UH	John Hardy-Tuliau 0–yard punt return (Billy Ray Stutzmann pass)	TIE 14–14
2	00:21	NEV	Rishard Matthews 8–yard pass from Cody Fajardo (Jake Hurst kick) (6 plays, 64 yards, 0:58)	NEV 21–14
3	09:35	NEV	Cody Fajardo 25–yard run (Jake Hurst kick) (9 plays, 78 yards, 4:29)	NEV 28–14
3	06:14	UH	Joey Iosefa 3–yard run (Kenton Chun kick) (8 plays, 54 yards, 3:12)	NEV 28–21
4	14:16	NEV	Shane Anderson 5–yard pass from Cody Fajardo (Jake Hurst kick) (8 plays, 55 yards, 3:16)	NEV 35–21
4	11:01	UH	Jeremiah Ostrowski 21–yard pass from Shane Austin (Kenton Chun kick) (8 plays, 69 yards, 3:10)	NEV 35–28
4	04:18	NEV	Kolby Arendse 15–yard pass from Mason Magleby (Jake Hurst kick) (13 plays, 80 yards, 6:37)	NEV 42–28

Statistics	Hawaii	Nevada
First downs	21	34
Total yards	307	528
Rushing yards	38	223
Passing yards	269	305
Turnovers	2	6
Time of possession	22:04	37:56

Team	Category	Player	Statistics
Hawaii	Passing	Shane Austin	17/38, 246 yards, 1 TD, 3 INTs
Hawaii	Rushing	Joey Iosefa	9 carries, 40 yards, 1 TD
Hawaii	Receiving	Jeremiah Ostrowski	8 receptions, 133 yards, 1 TD
Nevada	Passing	Cody Fajardo	25/36, 290 yards, 3 TDs
Nevada	Rushing	Lampford Mark	24 carries, 105 yards, 1 TD
Nevada	Receiving	Rishard Matthews	8 receptions, 118 yards, 2 TDs

=== Louisiana Tech ===
Louisiana Tech at Nevada

Team	1	2	3	4	Total
• Bulldogs	0	0	3	21	24
Wolf Pack	7	0	6	7	20

- Date: November 19, 2011
- Location: Mackay Stadium
  Reno, NV
- Game start: 1:05 p.m. PST
- Elapsed time: 2 hours and 57 minutes
- Game attendance: 11,639
- Game weather: Temperature: 41 °F (5 °C) • Weather: Mostly Cloudy • Wind: 2–5 MPH
- Referee: Bill Athan
- TV announcers (None): None

Scoring summary
1	00:45	NEV	Rishard Matthews 20–yard pass from Cody Fajardo (Jake Hurst kick) (10 plays, 78 yards, 4:35)	NEV 7–0
3	09:27	NEV	Jake Hurst 19–yard field goal (12 plays, 67 yards, 5:27)	NEV 10–0
3	05:54	LATECH	Matt Nelson 29–yard field goal (12 plays, 71 yards, 3:27)	NEV 10–3
3	03:29	NEV	Jake Hurst 24–yard field goal (6 plays, 59 yards, 2:19)	NEV 13–3
4	13:01	NEV	Stefphon Jefferson 4–yard run (Jake Hurst kick) (9 plays, 49 yards, 4:06)	NEV 20–3
4	09:11	LATECH	Quinton Patton 9–yard pass from Colby Cameron (Matt Nelson kick) (11 plays, 84 yards, 3:44)	NEV 20–10
4	05:56	LATECH	Myles White 14–yard pass from Colby Cameron (Matt Nelson kick) (6 plays, 89 yards, 1:43)	NEV 20–17
4	00:51	LATECH	Taulib Ikharo 8–yard pass from Colby Cameron (Matt Nelson kick) (7 plays, 92 yards, 1:38)	LATECH 24–20

Statistics	Louisiana Tech	Nevada
First downs	17	25
Total yards	412	465
Rushing yards	57	253
Passing yards	355	212
Turnovers	0	3
Time of possession	20:25	39:35

Team	Category	Player	Statistics
Louisiana Tech	Passing	Colby Cameron	25/45, 355 yards, 3 TDs
Louisiana Tech	Rushing	Hunter Lee	7 carries, 30 yards
Louisiana Tech	Receiving	Quinton Patton	7 receptions, 162 yards, 1 TD
Nevada	Passing	Cody Fajardo	23/32, 212 yards, 1 TD, 1 INT
Nevada	Rushing	Cody Fajardo	22 carries, 110 yards
Nevada	Receiving	Rishard Matthews	8 receptions, 87 yards, 1 TD

=== At Utah State ===
Nevada at Utah State

Team	1	2	3	4	Total
Wolf Pack	3	7	7	0	17
• Aggies	0	7	14	0	21

- Date: November 26, 2011
- Location: Romney Stadium
  Logan, UT
- Game start: 12:00 p.m. MST
- Elapsed time: 3 hours and 5 minutes
- Game attendance: 15,784
- Game weather: Temperature: 31 °F (−1 °C) • Weather: Clear and Brisk and Cold • Wind: N/A
- Referee: Stacy Hardin
- TV announcers (WSN): Barry Tompkins (play–by–play) and Joe Glenn (analyst)

Scoring summary
1	05:44	NEV	Jake Hurst 19–yard field goal (13 plays, 61 yards, 6:37)	NEV 3–0
2	14:16	NEV	Lampford Mark 35–yard run (Jake Hurst kick) (9 plays, 95 yards, 3:29)	NEV 10–0
2	02:37	USU	Kerwynn Williams 10–yard run (Josh Thompson kick) (8 plays, 89 yards, 3:41)	NEV 10–7
3	01:48	USU	Matt Austin 21–yard pass from Adam Kennedy (Josh Thompson kick) (5 plays, 80 yards, 1:36)	USU 14–10
3	01:23	NEV	Rishard Matthews 76–yard pass from Tyler Lantrip (Jake Hurst kick) (2 plays, 76 yards, 0:18)	NEV 17–14
3	00:00	USU	Robert Turbin 34–yard pass from Stanley Morrison (Josh Thompson kick) (5 plays, 77 yards, 1:18)	USU 21–17

Statistics	Nevada	Utah State
First downs	25	17
Total yards	500	373
Rushing yards	185	199
Passing yards	315	174
Turnovers	2	0
Time of possession	34:37	25:23

Team	Category	Player	Statistics
Nevada	Passing	Cody Fajardo	19/25, 180 yards
Nevada	Rushing	Lampford Mark	22 carries, 111 yards, 1 TD
Nevada	Receiving	Rishard Matthews	12 receptions, 205 yards, 1 TD
Utah State	Passing	Adam Kennedy	7/14, 140 yards, 1 TD, 1 INT
Utah State	Rushing	Kerwynn Williams	9 carries, 71 yards, 1 TD
Utah State	Receiving	Matt Austin	2 receptions, 61 yards, 1 TD

=== Idaho ===
Idaho at Nevada

Team	1	2	3	4	Total
Vandals	0	3	0	0	3
• Wolf Pack	7	21	7	21	56

- Date: December 3, 2011
- Location: Mackay Stadium
  Reno, NV
- Game start: 1:08 p.m. PST
- Elapsed time: 3 hours and 11 minutes
- Game attendance: 10,027
- Game weather: Temperature: 33 °F (1 °C) • Weather: Cool and Sunny • Wind: E 4 MPH
- Referee: Robert Cameron
- TV announcers (WSN/ALT): Barry Tompkins (play–by–play) and Joe Glenn (analyst)

Scoring summary
1	00:20	NEV	Lampford Mark 6–yard run (Jake Hurst kick) (9 plays, 60 yards, 3:59)	NEV 7–0
2	09:58	NEV	Aaron Bradley 63–yard pass from Tyler Lantrip (Jake Hurst kick) (3 plays, 76 yards, 1:05)	NEV 14–0
2	05:44	IDAHO	Trey Farquhar 19–yard field goal (10 plays, 71 yards, 4:01)	NEV 14–3
2	02:37	NEV	Aaron Bradley 15–yard pass from Tyler Lantrip (Jake Hurst kick) (7 plays, 79 yards, 3:01)	NEV 21–3
2	00:10	NEV	Tray Session 28–yard pass from Tyler Lantrip (Jake Hurst kick) (7 plays, 68 yards, 1:59)	NEV 28–3
3	06:35	NEV	Aaron Bradley 22–yard pass from Tyler Lantrip (Jake Hurst kick) (9 plays, 80 yards, 4:18)	NEV 35–3
4	14:55	NEV	Rishard Matthews 4–yard pass from Mason Magleby (Jake Hurst kick) (13 plays, 89 yards, 3:55)	NEV 42–3
4	13:46	NEV	Jeremiah Green 56–yard interception (Jake Hurst kick)	NEV 49–3
4	04:24	NEV	Kendall Brock 7–yard pass from Mason Magleby (Jake Hurst kick) (10 plays, 56 yards, 5:19)	NEV 56–3

Statistics	Idaho	Nevada
First downs	13	35
Total yards	306	587
Rushing yards	128	226
Passing yards	178	361
Turnovers	0	2
Time of possession	24:12	35:48

Team	Category	Player	Statistics
Idaho	Passing	Brian Reader	11/27, 145 yards, 2 INTs
Idaho	Rushing	Princeton McCarty	7 carries, 57 yards
Idaho	Receiving	Mike Scott	4 receptions, 68 yards
Nevada	Passing	Tyler Lantrip	24/31, 340 yards, 4 TDs
Nevada	Rushing	Lampford Mark	24 carries, 104 yards, 1 TD
Nevada	Receiving	Aaron Bradley	7 receptions, 136 yards, 3 TDs

=== Vs. Southern Miss (Hawaii Bowl) ===
Nevada vs. Southern Miss
(Hawaii Bowl)

Team	1	2	3	4	Total
Wolf Pack	0	14	3	0	17
• No. 22 Golden Eagles	0	17	0	7	24

- Date: December 24, 2011
- Location: Aloha Stadium
  Halawa, HI
- Game start: 3:06 p.m.
- Elapsed time: 3 hours and 38 minutes
- Game attendance: 32,630
- Game weather: Temperature: 81 °F (27 °C) • Weather: Partly Cloudy • Wind: NE 16 MPH
- Referee: Alan Eck
- TV announcers (ESPN): Mark Jones (play–by–play), Ed Cunningham (analyst) and Jessica Mendoza (sideline)

Scoring summary
2	14:06	USM	Tray Becton-Martin 0–yard blocked punt return (Daniel Hrapmann kick)	USM 7–0
2	07:45	NEV	Lampford Mark 5–yard run (Allen Hardison kick) (13 plays, 81 yards, 6:16)	TIE 7–7
2	04:54	NEV	Lampford Mark 45–yard run (Allen Hardison kick) (4 plays, 68 yards, 1:29)	NEV 14–7
2	01:21	USM	Danny Hrapmann 48–yard field goal (5 plays, 13 yards, 1:33)	NEV 14–10
2	00:12	USM	Tracy Lampley 2–yard pass from Austin Davis (Daniel Hrapmann kick) (7 plays, 24 yards, 1:04)	USM 17–14
3	02:44	NEV	Allen Hardison 37–yard field goal (4 plays, –6 yards, 1:57)	TIE 17–17
4	05:48	USM	Kelvin Bolden 4–yard pass from Austin Davis (Daniel Hrapmann kick) (7 plays, 68 yards, 1:36)	USM 24–17

Statistics	Nevada	Southern Miss
First downs	15	19
Total yards	313	336
Rushing yards	196	171
Passing yards	117	165
Turnovers	2	4
Time of possession	31:50	28:10

Team	Category	Player	Statistics
Nevada	Passing	Cody Fajardo	8/19, 60 yards, 1 INT
Nevada	Rushing	Lampford Mark	29 carries, 183 yards, 2 TDs
Nevada	Receiving	Aaron Bradley	7 receptions, 64 yards
Southern Miss	Passing	Austin Davis	18/41, 165 yards, 2 TDs
Southern Miss	Rushing	Desmond Johnson	16 carries, 77 yards
Southern Miss	Receiving	Dominique Sullivan	5 receptions, 75 yards

== Roster ==
2011 Nevada Wolf Pack football team roster
Players
Coaches
Offense

Pos.	#	Name	Class
WR	1J	Clay Reinhardt	Fr
WR	2E	Chance Early	Fr
WR	2G	Nick Palko	Fr
RB	4D	Lawrence Hall	Fr
WR	4	Brandon Wimberly	Jr
RB	5	Mike Ball	Jr
QB	6	Mason Magleby	So
QB	7	Corbin Louks	Sr
QB	13	Devin Combs	So
QB	14	Tanner Roderick	Fr
WR	15	Rishard Matthews	Sr
QB	16	Tyler Lantrip	Sr
QB	17	Cody Fajardo (C)	Fr
WR	18	L.J. Washington	So
WR	23	Shane Anderson	Sr
RB	25	Stefphon Jefferson	So
RB	29	Lampford Mark	Sr
RB	31	Anthony Knight	Fr
RB	32	Nick Hale	Jr
RB	39	Nate Lytle	So
TE	44	Zach Sudfeld	Sr
RB	45	Kendall Brock	Fr
OL	57	Connor Talbott	Fr
OL	59	Kyle Papendorf	So
OL	62	Zach Brickell	Fr
OL	63	Avery Poates	Fr
OL	64	Brandon Grinstead	Fr
OL	65	Matt Galas	Fr
OL	66	Kyle Roberts	Fr
OL	67	Jeff Meads	Sr
OL	70	Joel Bitonio	So
OL	71	Jordan Mudge	Sr
OL	73	Sebastian Tretola	Fr
OL	74	Steve Haley	Sr
OL	75	Chris Barker	Jr
OL	76	Mike Mitchell	Fr
OL	77	Alex Pinto	Jr
OL	78	Jeff Nady	Jr
TE	79	DeAndre Roberts	Fr
WR	80	Dominic Coulter	Fr
WR	81	Aaron Bradley	Fr
WR	82	Tray Session	Sr
WR	83	Joseph Huber	So
WR	84	Parker Vail	Fr
TE	85	Erik Stewart	Jr
SO	86	Kolby Arendse	So
WR	87	Necho Beard	Fr
TE	88	Randy Horton	So
OL	89	Stephen Jeffers	So
OL	92	Jordan Hanson	Fr

Defense

Pos.	#	Name	Class
DB	1D	Christian Montanari	So
DB	2	Khalid Wooten	Jr
DB	3	Malik James	Jr
DB	3E	Gabe Lee	Fr
LB	4F	Trevor Taft	Fr
DB	8	Marlon Johnson	Jr
DL	9	Jake Peppard	Fr
LB	12	Kaelin Burnett	Sr
DB	19	Evan Favors	Fr
DB	20	Duke Williams	Jr
DB	22	Thaddeus Brown	Jr
DB	24	Charles Garrett	Fr
LB	26	Dray Bell	Jr
DB	28	Isaiah Frey	Sr
DB	30	Bubba Boudreaux	Sr
DB	33	Brandon Marshall	Sr
DB	34	Ty Thompson	Jr
LB	35	Lorenzo Devers	Fr
DB	36	Aaron Brown	Fr
DB	38	Desman Carter	Fr
LB	42	DeAndre Boughton	Sr
DB	46	Bryson Keeton	Fr
LB	47	Brett Roy	Sr
LB	48	Ryan Goforth	Fr
LB	49	Jordan Dobrich	Fr
LB	50	Jonathan McNeal	So
LB	51	Albert Rosette	Jr
LB	52	James-Michael Johnson	Sr
DL	53	Brock Hekking	Fr
LB	54	Jeremiah Green	Jr
DL	55	Rykeem Yates	Fr
LB	56	Marcus Mcllwain	Jr
LB	58	Burton De Koning	Fr
DL	72	David Jamieson	So
DL	90	Tyler Houk	So
DL	91	Scott Frisbie	Sr
DL	93	Zack Madonick	Sr
DL	94	Lenny Jones	Fr
DL	95	Willie Faataualofa	Sr
DL	97	Mark Avery	Jr
DL	98	Jack Reynoso	So
DL	99	Sam Foster	So

Special teams

Pos.	#	Name	Class
PK	4G	Colin Ditsworth	Fr
P	37	Chase Tenpenny	Jr
PK	40	Anthony Martinez	So
PK	60	Allen Hardison	Jr
P	68	Logan Yunker	Fr
P	69	Jake Hurst	Sr

Head coach

- Chris Ault

Coordinators/assistant coaches

- Andy Buh – Defensive coordinator/linebackers
- Ken Wilson – Associate head coach/defensive Ends/linebackers
- Scott Baumgartner – Assistant coach
- James Ward – Cornerbacks
- Cameron Norcross – Offensive line/run game coordinator
- James Spady – Tight ends/Assistant Offensive Line
- Barry Sacks – Defensive tackles
- Mike Bradeson – Safeties
- Casey Moore – Running backs

Legend

- (C) Team captain
- (S) Suspended
- (I) Ineligible
- Injured
- Redshirt

Roster
Last update: January 31, 2021

== Players in the 2012 NFL draft ==
Player	Position	Round	Pick	NFL club
James-Michael Johnson	LB	4	120	Cleveland Browns
Brandon Marshall	DB	5	142	Jacksonville Jaguars
Isaiah Frey	DB	6	184	Chicago Bears
Rishard Matthews	WR	7	227	Miami Dolphins
