= Tenpenny =

Tenpenny may refer to:

== People ==
- Chase Tenpenny (born 1991), American football player
- Mitchell Tenpenny (born 1989), American country music singer and songwriter
- Sherri Tenpenny, American anti-vaccinationist

== Others ==
- Nail (fastener)
- Frank Tenpenny, the main antagonist of Grand Theft Auto: San Andreas
- Tenpenny Tower, a hotel owned by Allistair Tenpenny in Fallout 3

== See also ==
- Twopenny (disambiguation)
- Fivepenny (disambiguation)
