= 2011 Western Athletic Conference football season =

2011 WAC football season
- League: NCAA Division I Football Bowl Subdivision
- Sport: Football
- Duration: September 1, 2011 through December 24, 2011
- Teams: 8
- TV partner(s): ESPN, WAC Sports Network

2012 NFL Draft
- Top draft pick: LB Bobby Wagner, USU
- Picked by: Seattle Seahawks, 47th overall

Regular season
- Champions: Louisiana Tech
- Season MVP: RB Robert Turbin, USU; LB Adrien Cole, La. Tech

Football seasons
- 2010 2012

2011 Western Athletic Conference football standings
	Conf.			Overall
Team	W		L	W		L
Louisiana Tech $	6	–	1	8	–	5
Nevada	5	–	2	7	–	6
Utah State	5	–	2	7	–	6
Hawaii	3	–	4	6	–	7
San Jose State	3	–	4	5	–	7
Fresno State	3	–	4	4	–	9
New Mexico State	2	–	5	4	–	9
Idaho	1	–	6	2	–	10
$ – Conference champion

The 2011 Western Athletic Conference football season is a college football season for the Western Athletic Conference. The 2011 season consisted of eight members: Fresno State, Hawaiʻi, Idaho, Louisiana Tech, Nevada, New Mexico State, San Jose State, and Utah State.

This season the WAC's membership changed for the first time since 2005. Boise State, who joined the conference in 2001, left to join the Mountain West Conference.

This season was the last year of membership for three other schools: Fresno State, Hawaiʻi, and Nevada. All became members of the Mountain West in 2012 (Hawaiʻi as a football only member, other sports will join the Big West Conference). In response to their departure, the WAC added five new members in 2012. Of the new members, only Texas State and UTSA had football programs.

== Preseason ==
=== Award watch lists ===
The following WAC players were named to preseason award watch lists.

Maxwell Award:

- Bryant Moniz – Hawaiʻi

Fred Biletnikoff Award:

- Royce Pollard – Hawaiʻi
- Rishard Mathews – Nevada
- Noel Grigsby – San Jose State

Bronko Nagurski Trophy:

- Logan Harrell – Fresno State
- James-Michael Johnson – Nevada
- Bobby Wagner – Utah State

Outland Trophy:

- Logan Harrell – Fresno State
- Chris Barker – Nevada

Jim Thorpe Award:

- Duke Ihenacho – San Jose State

Lombardi Award:

- Corey Paredes – Hawaiʻi
- Bobby Wagner – Utah State

Rimington Trophy:

- Tyler Larsen – Utah State

Davey O'Brien Award:

- Bryant Moniz – Hawaiʻi

Doak Walker Award:

- Lennon Creer – Louisiana Tech
- Robert Turbin – Utah State

Walter Camp Award:

- Bryant Moniz – Hawaiʻi

Lou Groza Award:

- Trey Farquhar – Idaho
- Kevin Goessling – Fresno State

=== WAC Football Preview ===
During the WAC Football Preview in Las Vegas on July 27–28, Hawaiʻi was selected as the favorite to win the conference by both the media and the coaches. In the media poll, Hawaiʻ received 18 first place votes. Fresno State and Nevada both received 11 first place votes with Utah State receiving one. In the coaches poll, Hawaiʻi received five first place votes while Fresno State, who ranked second, received one first place vote and Nevada, who ranked third, received two first place votes.

==== Media Poll ====
1. Hawaiʻi – 292 (18)
2. Fresno State – 284 (11)
3. Nevada – 264 (11)
4. Louisiana Tech – 184
5. Utah State – 164 (1)
6. Idaho – 141
7. San Jose State – 85
8. New Mexico State – 60

==== Coaches Poll ====
1. Hawaiʻi – 47 (5)
2. Fresno State – 41 (1)
3. Nevada – 40 (2)
4. Louisiana Tech – 31
5. Utah State – 22
6. Idaho – 21
7. San Jose State – 15
8. New Mexico State – 7

The media also voted on the WAC preseason players of the year. Hawaiʻi's Bryant Moniz was selected as the offensive player of the year and Utah State's Bobby Wagner was selected as the defensive player of the year.

== Coaches ==
NOTE: Stats shown are before the beginning of the season

Team	Head coach	Years at school	Overall record	Record at school	WAC record
Fresno State	Pat Hill	15	108–71	108–71	75–36
Hawaiʻi	Greg McMackin	4	23–18	23–18	15–9
Idaho	Robb Akey	5	17–33	17–33	8–24
Louisiana Tech	Sonny Dykes	2	5–7	5–7	4–4
Nevada	Chris Ault	27	219–97–1	219–97–1	36–17
New Mexico State	DeWayne Walker	2	5–21	5–20	2–14
San Jose State	Mike MacIntyre	2	1–12	1–12	0–8
Utah State	Gary Andersen	3	12–23	8–16	5–11

== WAC vs. BCS matchups ==
Date	Visitor	Home	Notes
September 3^	Fresno State 21	California 36	Played at Candlestick Park
September 3	Colorado 17	Hawaiʻi 34	
September 3	San Jose State 3	#6 Stanford 57	Bill Walsh Legacy Game
September 3	Utah State 38	#19 Auburn 42	Utah State led by 10 with less than 5 minutes to play
September 10	Fresno State 29	#10 Nebraska 42	
September 10	Hawaiʻi 32	Washington 40	
September 10	Nevada 20	#14 Oregon 69	
September 10	New Mexico State 28	Minnesota 21	NMSU first win over BCS team since 1999
September 10	San Jose State 17	UCLA 27	
September 17	Idaho 7	#9 Texas A&M 37	
September 24	Louisiana Tech 20	Mississippi State 26	Overtime
September 24	Nevada 34	Texas Tech 35	
October 1	Mississippi 38	Fresno State 28	
October 1	Idaho 20	Virginia 21	Overtime
November 5	New Mexico State 16	Georgia 63	
November 12	Louisiana Tech 27	Mississippi 7	
^Denotes neutral site game

== Regular season ==
Index to colors and formatting
WAC member won
WAC member lost
WAC teams in **bold**

All dates, times, and TV are tentative and subject to change.

The WAC has teams in four different time zones. Times reflect start time in respective time zone of each team (Central–Louisiana Tech, Mountain–New Mexico State, Utah State, Pacific–Fresno State, Idaho, Nevada, San Jose State, Hawaiian–Hawaiʻi). Conference games start times are that of the home team.

Rankings reflect that of the USA Today Coaches poll for that week until week eight when the BCS poll will be used.

=== Week one ===
Date	Time	Visiting team	Home team	Site	TV	Result	Attendance
September 1	6:00 p.m.	Bowling Green	**Idaho**	Kibbie Dome • Moscow, ID	ALT	**L** 15–32	12,173
September 3	10:00 a.m.	**Utah State**	#19 Auburn	Jordan–Hare Stadium • Auburn, AL	ESPN2	**L** 38–42	85,245
September 3	2:00 p.m.	**San Jose State**	#6 Stanford	Stanford Stadium • Stanford, CA (Bill Walsh Legacy Game)	CSNBA	**L** 3–57	47,816
September 3 ^	4:00 p.m.	**Fresno State**	California	Candlestick Park • San Francisco (TicketCity Battle by the Bay)	CSNCA	**L** 21–36	31,563
September 3	6:00 p.m.	Colorado	**Hawaiʻi**	Aloha Stadium • Honolulu, HI	ESPN2	**W** 34–17	37,001
September 3	6:00 p.m.	Ohio	**New Mexico State**	Aggie Memorial Stadium • Las Cruces, NM	ALT	**L** 24–44	14,728
September 3	9:00 p.m.	**Louisiana Tech**	Southern Miss	M. M. Roberts Stadium • Hattiesburg, MS (Rivalry in Dixie)	FSN	**L** 17–19	22,356

^ Neutral site

Players of the week:

Offensive		Defensive		Special teams	
Player	Team	Player	Team	Player	Team
Bryant Moniz	Hawaiʻi	Paipai Falemalu	Hawaiʻi	Taveon Rogers	New Mexico State

=== Week two ===
Date	Time	Visiting team	Home team	Site	TV	Result	Attendance
September 10	9:30 a.m.	**Hawaiʻi**	Washington	Husky Stadium • Seattle, WA	RSNW	**L** 32–40	63,252
September 10	12:30 p.m.	**Nevada**	#14 Oregon	Autzen Stadium • Eugene, OR	FX	**L** 20–69	58,818
September 10	1:30 p.m.	**New Mexico State**	Minnesota	TCF Bank Stadium • Minneapolis, MN	BTN	**W** 28–21	48,807
September 10	2:00 p.m.	North Dakota	**Idaho**	Kibbie Dome • Moscow, ID	SWX	**W** 44–14	10,608
September 10	4:00 p.m.	**Fresno State**	#10 Nebraska	Memorial Stadium • Lincoln, NE	BTN	**L** 29–42	85,101
September 10	6:00 p.m.	Central Arkansas	**Louisiana Tech**	Joe Aillet Stadium • Ruston, LA	ESPN3	**W** 48–42 OT	20,652
September 10	6:00 p.m.	Weber State	**Utah State**	Romney Stadium • Logan, UT (Beehive Boot)		**W** 54–17	18,239
September 10	7:00 p.m.	**San Jose State**	UCLA	Rose Bowl • Pasadena, CA	Prime Ticket	**L** 17–27	42,685

Players of the week:

Offensive		Defensive		Special teams	
Player	Team	Player	Team	Player	Team
Andrew Manley	New Mexico State	Jonte Green	New Mexico State	Devin Wylie	Fresno State

=== Week three ===
Date	Time	Visiting team	Home team	Site	TV	Result	Attendance
September 17	1:00 p.m.	**Nevada**	**San Jose State**	Spartan Stadium • San Jose, CA	WSN	**NEV** 17–14	17,238
September 17	4:00 p.m.	**Hawaiʻi**	UNLV	Sam Boyd Stadium • Whitney, NV	The Mtn.	**L** 20–40	21,248
September 17	4:00 p.m.	**Idaho**	#9 Texas A&M	Kyle Field • College Station, TX	FSN PPV	**L** 7–37	86,623
September 17	6:00 p.m.	Houston	**Louisiana Tech**	Joe Aillet Stadium • Ruston, LA	ESPN3	**L** 34–35	24,628
September 17	6:00 p.m.	UTEP	**New Mexico State**	Aggie Memorial Stadium • Las Cruces, NM (The Battle of I-10)	ALT	**L** 10–16	19,751
September 17	7:00 p.m.	North Dakota	**Fresno State**	Bulldog Stadium • Fresno, CA	ESPN3	**W** 27–22	27,542

Players of the week:

Offensive		Defensive		Special teams	
Player	Team	Player	Team	Player	Team
Mike Ball	Nevada	Logan Harrell	Fresno State	Jake Hurst	Nevada

=== Week four ===
Date	Time	Visiting team	Home team	Site	TV	Result	Attendance
September 24	1:00 p.m.	**New Mexico State**	**San Jose State**	Spartan Stadium • San Jose, CA		**SJSU** 34–24	13,456
September 24	2:00 p.m.	**Fresno State**	**Idaho**	Kibbie Dome • Moscow, ID	WSN	**FRES** 48–24	15,110
September 24	4:00 p.m.	**Nevada**	Texas Tech	Jones AT&T Stadium • Lubbock, TX	FCS	**L** 34–35	55,664
September 24	6:00 p.m.	UC Davis	**Hawaiʻi**	Aloha Stadium • Honolulu, HI	Oceanic PPV	**W** 56–14	30,756
September 24	6:00 p.m.	**Louisiana Tech**	Mississippi State	Davis Wade Stadium • Starkville, MS	ESPNU	**L** 20–26 OT	55,116
September 24	6:00 p.m.	Colorado State	**Utah State**	Romney Stadium • Logan, UT	ESPN3	**L** 34–35 2OT	22,599

Players of the week:

Offensive		Defensive		Special teams	
Player	Team	Player	Team	Player	Team
Bryant Moniz	Hawaiʻi	Travis Brown	Fresno State	Kevin Goessling	Fresno State

=== Week five ===
Date	Time	Visiting team	Home team	Site	TV	Result	Attendance
September 30	6:00 p.m.	**Utah State**	BYU	LaVell Edwards Stadium • Provo, UT	ESPN	**L** 24–27	63,513
October 1	11:30 a.m.	**Nevada**	#5 Boise State	Bronco Stadium • Boise, ID (rivalry)	Versus	**L** 10–30	34,098
October 1	12:30 p.m.	**Idaho**	Virginia	Scott Stadium • Charlottesville, VA	ESPN3	**L** 20–21 OT	39,827
October 1	1:00 p.m.	**San Jose State**	Colorado State	Sonny Lubick Field at Hughes Stadium • Fort Collins, CO	The Mtn.	**W** 38–31	27,863
October 1	5:00 p.m.	**New Mexico State**	New Mexico	University Stadium • Albuquerque, NM (Rio Grande Rivalry)	The Mtn.	**W** 42–28	30,019
October 1	6:00 p.m.	**Hawaiʻi**	**Louisiana Tech**	Joe Aillet Stadium • Ruston, LA	ESPN Plus	**HAW** 44–26	25,212
October 1	6:15 p.m.	Mississippi	**Fresno State**	Bulldog Stadium • Fresno, CA	ESPN2	**L** 28–38	32,063

Players of the week:

Offensive		Defensive		Special teams	
Player	Team	Player	Team	Player	Team
Matt Christian	New Mexico State	Keith Smith	San Jose State	Justin Hernandez	Idaho

=== Week six ===
Date	Time	Visiting team	Home team	Site	TV	Result	Attendance
October 7	6:00 p.m.	#6 Boise State	**Fresno State**	Bulldog Stadium • Fresno, CA	ESPN	**L** 7–57	33,871
October 8	1:00 p.m.	UNLV	**Nevada**	Mackay Stadium • Reno, NV (37th Battle for Nevada)	ESPN3	**W** 37–0	25,978
October 8	2:00 p.m.	**Louisiana Tech**	**Idaho**	Kibbie Dome • Moscow, ID	ESPN3	**LT** 24–11	15,309
October 8	6:00 p.m.	Wyoming	**Utah State**	Romney Stadium • Logan, UT	ESPN3	**W** 63–19	17,561
October 8	7:15 p.m.	**San Jose State**	BYU	LaVell Edwards Stadium • Provo, UT	ESPNU	**L** 16–29	59,783

Players of the week:

Offensive		Defensive		Special teams	
Player	Team	Player	Team	Player	Team
Chuckie Keeton	Utah State	Brett Roy	Nevada	Ryan Allen	Louisiana Tech

=== Week seven ===
Date	Time	Visiting team	Home team	Site	TV	Result	Attendance
October 14	6:00 p.m.	**Hawaiʻi**	**San Jose State**	Spartan Stadium • San Jose, CA	ESPN	**SJSU** 28–27	24,643
October 15	1:00 p.m.	New Mexico	**Nevada**	Mackay Stadium • Reno, NV		**W** 49–7	15,369
October 15	6:00 p.m.	**Idaho**	**New Mexico State**	Aggie Memorial Stadium • Las Cruces, NM	ALT2	**NMSU** 31–24	12,711
October 15	7:00 p.m.	**Utah State**	**Fresno State**	Bulldog Stadium • Fresno, CA	ESPN3	**FRES** 31–21	28,854

Players of the week:

Offensive		Defensive		Special teams	
Player	Team	Player	Team	Player	Team
Chandler Jones	San Jose State	Khalid Wooten	Nevada	Travis Johnson	San Jose State

=== Week eight ===
Date	Time	Visiting team	Home team	Site	TV	Result	Attendance
October 22	1:00 p.m.	**Fresno State**	**Nevada**	Mackay Stadium • Reno, NV	WSN	**NEV** 45–38	15,113
October 22	1:00 p.m.	**Louisiana Tech**	**Utah State**	Romney Stadium • Logan, UT		**LT** 24–17	16,037
October 22	6:00 p.m.	**New Mexico State**	**Hawaiʻi**	Aloha Stadium • Honolulu, HI		**HAW** 45–34	30,586

Players of the week:

Offensive		Defensive		Special teams	
Player	Team	Player	Team	Player	Team
Mike Ball	Nevada	Adrien Cole	Louisiana Tech	Ryan Allen	Louisiana Tech

=== Week nine ===
Date	Time	Visiting team	Home team	Site	TV	Result	Attendance
October 29	2:00 p.m.	**Hawaiʻi**	**Idaho**	Kibbie Dome • Moscow, ID	ESPN Plus	**HAW** 16–14	10,461
October 29	3:00 p.m.	**San Jose State**	**Louisiana Tech**	Joe Aillet Stadium • Ruston, LA		**LT** 38–28	19,642
October 29	6:00 p.m.	**Nevada**	**New Mexico State**	Aggie Memorial Stadium • Las Cruces, NM	WSN	**NEV** 48–34	15,782

Players of the week:

Offensive		Defensive		Special teams	
Player	Team	Player	Team	Player	Team
Cody Fajardo	Nevada	Aaron Brown	Hawaiʻi	Kenton Chun	Hawaiʻi

=== Week ten ===
Date	Time	Visiting team	Home team	Site	TV	Result	Attendance
November 5	10:30 a.m.	**New Mexico State**	#18 Georgia	Sanford Stadium • Athens, GA	CSS	**L** 16–63	92,746
November 5	1:00 p.m.	**Idaho**	**San Jose State**	Spartan Stadium • San Jose, CA	WSN	**IDHO** 32–29	10,621
November 5	6:00 p.m.	**Utah State**	**Hawaiʻi**	Aloha Stadium • Honolulu, HI	Oceanic PPV	**USU** 35–31	30,301
November 5	9:30 p.m.	**Louisiana Tech**	**Fresno State**	Bulldog Stadium • Fresno, CA (Battle for the Bone)	ESPNU	**LT** 41–21	27,965

Players of the week:

Offensive		Defensive		Special teams	
Player	Team	Player	Team	Player	Team
Colby Cameron	La Tech	Travis Johnson	San Jose State	Stanley Morrison	Utah State

=== Week eleven ===
Date	Time	Visiting team	Home team	Site	TV	Result	Attendance
November 12	1:00 p.m.	**San Jose State**	**Utah State**	Romney Stadium • Logan, UT	WSN	**USU** 34–33	14,593
November 12	6:00 p.m.	**Fresno State**	**New Mexico State**	Aggie Memorial Stadium • Las Cruces, NM	WSN	**NMSU** 48–45	14,227
November 12	6:15 p.m.	**Idaho**	BYU	LaVell Edwards Stadium • Provo, UT	ESPN2	**L** 7–42	57,770
November 12	6:30 p.m.	**Louisiana Tech**	Mississippi	Vaught–Hemingway Stadium • Oxford, MS	CSS/CST	**W** 27–7	44,123
November 12	7:15 p.m.	**Hawaiʻi**	**Nevada**	Mackay Stadium • Reno, NV	ESPNU	**NEV** 42–28	16,527

Players of the week:

Offensive		Defensive		Special teams	
Player	Team	Player	Team	Player	Team
Cody Fajardo (2)	Nevada	IK Enemkpali	La Tech	Taveon Rogers (2)	New Mexico State

=== Week twelve ===
Date	Time	Visiting team	Home team	Site	TV	Result	Attendance
November 19	1:00 p.m.	**Louisiana Tech**	**Nevada**	Mackay Stadium • Reno, NV	WSN	**LT** 24–20	11,639
November 19	1:00 p.m.	Navy	**San Jose State**	Spartan Stadium • San Jose, CA	ESPN3	**W** 27-24	25,114
November 19	2:00 p.m.	**Utah State**	**Idaho**	Kibbie Dome • Moscow, ID	ESPN Plus	**USU** 49–42 ^{2OT}	8,216
November 19	6:00 p.m.	**Fresno State**	**Hawaiʻi**	Aloha Stadium • Honolulu, HI	WSN	**FRES** 24–21	28,907
November 19	8:15	**New Mexico State**	BYU	LaVell Edwards Stadium • Provo, UT	ESPNU	**L** 7–42	57,134

=== Week thirteen ===
Date	Time	Visiting team	Home team	Site	TV	Result	Attendance
November 26	1:00 p.m.	**Nevada**	**Utah State**	Romney Stadium • Logan, UT		**USU** 21-17	15,784
November 26	3:00 p.m.	**New Mexico State**	**Louisiana Tech**	Joe Aillet Stadium • Ruston, LA	ESPN Plus	**LT** 44-0	17,458
November 26	5:00 p.m.	**San Jose State**	**Fresno State**	Bulldog Stadium • Fresno, CA (rivalry)		**SJSU** 27-24	25,492
November 26	6:00 p.m.	Tulane	**Hawaiʻi**	Aloha Stadium • Honolulu, HI	Oceanic PPV	**W** 35-23	27,411

=== Week fourteen ===
Date	Time	Visiting team	Home team	Site	TV	Result	Attendance
December 3	1:00 p.m.	**Idaho**	**Nevada**	Mackay Stadium • Reno, NV	WSN	NV 56-3	10,027
December 3	5:00 p.m.	**Fresno State**	San Diego State	Qualcomm Stadium • San Diego, CA	CBS Sports Network	SDST 35-28	32,790
December 3	6:00 p.m.	BYU	**Hawaiʻi**	Aloha Stadium • Honolulu, HI	ESPN2	BYU 41-20	30,765
December 3	6:00 p.m.	**Utah State**	**New Mexico State**	Aggie Memorial Stadium • Las Cruces, NM		USU 41-20	13,631

== All-WAC Teams ==
=== First Team ===
Offense
QB Derek Carr–Fresno State
RB Robert Turbin–Utah State
RB Robbie Rouse–Fresno State
WR Jalen Saunders–Fresno State
WR Rishard Matthews–Nevada
TE Ryan Otten–San Jose State
OL Bryce Harris–Fresno State
OL Chris Barker–Nevada
OL Tyler Larsen–Utah State
OL Philip Gapelu–Utah State
OL Davonte Wallace–New Mexico State

Defense
DL Matt Broha–Louisiana Tech
DL Brett Roy–Nevada
DL Logan Harrell–Fresno State
DL Travis Johnson–San Jose State
LB Adrien Cole–Louisiana Tech
LB Bobby Wagner–Utah State
LB Travis Brown–Fresno State
DB Isaiah Frey–Nevada
DB Duke Ihenacho–San Jose State
DB Donyae Coleman–New Mexico State
DB John Hardy-Tuliau–Hawaiʻi

Specialists
PK Matt Nelson–Louisiana Tech
P Bobby Cowan–Idaho
KR Taveon Rogers–New Mexico State
PR Devon Wylie-Fresno State

=== Second Team ===
Offense
QB Bryant Moniz–Hawaiʻi
RB Kenny Turner–New Mexico State
RB Lennon Creer–Louisiana Tech
WR Quinton Patton–Louisiana Tech
WR Taveon Rogers–New Mexico State
TE Michael LaGrone–Idaho
OL Matt Cleveland–Idaho
OL Kris Cavitt–Louisiana Tech
OL David Quessenberry–San Jose State
OL Jeff Nady–Nevada
OL Bryce Harris–Fresno State

Defense
DL Kaniela Tuipulotu–Hawaiʻi
DL Christian Lacey–Louisiana Tech
DL David Niumatalolo–New Mexico State
DL Pierre Fils–New Mexico State
LB Aaron Brown–Hawaiʻi
LB Corey Paredes–Hawaiʻi
LB Keith Smith–San Jose State
DB L.J. Jones–Fresno State
DB Gary Walker–Idaho
DB Terry Carter–Louisiana Tech
DB Matthew Harvey–Idaho

Specialists
PK Jens Alvernik–San Jose State
P Ryan Allen–Louisiana Tech
KR Mike Edwards–Hawaiʻi
PR Rishard Matthews-Nevada

=== Players of the year ===
Offense
Robert Turbin–Utah State

Defense
Bobby Wagner–Utah State

Freshman
Cody Fajardo–Nevada

=== Coach of the year ===
Sonny Dykes–Louisiana Tech

== Bowl games ==
Bowl	Date	Winner*	Score	Loser*	Score	Location	Time^{+}	Network	Notes
Famous Idaho Potato	Dec. 17, 2011	Ohio	24	**Utah State**	23	Boise, Idaho	2:30 p.m.	ESPN	
SDCCU Poinsettia	Dec. 21, 2011	#15 TCU	31	**Louisiana Tech**	24	San Diego, California	5:00 p.m.	ESPN	
Sheraton Hawaiʻi Bowl	Dec. 24, 2011	Southern Miss	24	**Nevada**	17	Honolulu, Hawaii	5:00 p.m.	ESPN	
*WAC team is **bolded**. ^{+}Time given is Pacific Time Rankings reflect Coaches Poll

== Home attendance ==
Team	Stadium (Capacity)	Game 1	Game 2	Game 3	Game 4	Game 5	Game 6	Game 7	Total	Average	% of Capacity
Fresno State	Bulldog Stadium (41,031)	27,542	32,063	33,871	28,854	27,965	25,492	—	175,787	29,298	71.4%
Hawaiʻi	Aloha Stadium (50,000)	37,001	30,756	30,586	30,301	28,907	27,411	30,765	215,727	30,818	61.6%
Idaho	Kibbie Dome (16,000)	12,173	10,608	15,110	15,309	10,461	8,216	—	71,877	11,980	74.9%
Louisiana Tech	Joe Aillet Stadium (30,600)	20,652	24,628	25,212	19,642	17,458	—	—	107,592	21,518	70.3%
Nevada	Mackay Stadium (29,993)	25,978	15,369	15,113	16,527	11,639	10,027	—	94,653	15,776	52.6%
New Mexico State	Aggie Memorial Stadium (30,343)	14,728	19,751	12,711	15,782	14,227	13,631	—	90,830	15,138	49.9%
San Jose State	Spartan Stadium (30,456)	17,238	13,456	24,643	10,621	25,114	—	—	91,072	18,214	59.8%
Utah State	Romney Stadium (25,513)	18,239	22,599	17,561	16,037	14,593	15,784	—	104,813	17,468	68.5%

== NFL draft ==
The following list includes all WAC players who were drafted in the 2012 NFL draft.

Round #	Pick #	NFL team	Player	Position	College
2	47	Seattle Seahawks	Bobby Wagner	LB	Utah State
4	106	Seattle Seahawks	Robert Turbin	RB	Utah State
4	107	Kansas City Chiefs	Devon Wylie	WR	Fresno State
4	120	Cleveland Browns	James-Michael Johnson	LB	Nevada
5	142	Jacksonville Jaguars	Brandon Marshall	LB	Nevada
5	154	Seattle Seahawks	Korey Toomer	LB	Idaho
6	184	Chicago Bears	Isaiah Frey	CB	Nevada
6	196	Jacksonville Jaguars	Jonte Green	CB	New Mexico State
7	209	St. Louis Rams	Aaron Brown	LB	Hawaii
7	212	Tampa Bay Buccaneers	Michael Smith	RB	Utah State
7	227	Miami Dolphins	Rishard Matthews	WR	Nevada
