= Bryce Harris =

American football player (born 1989)

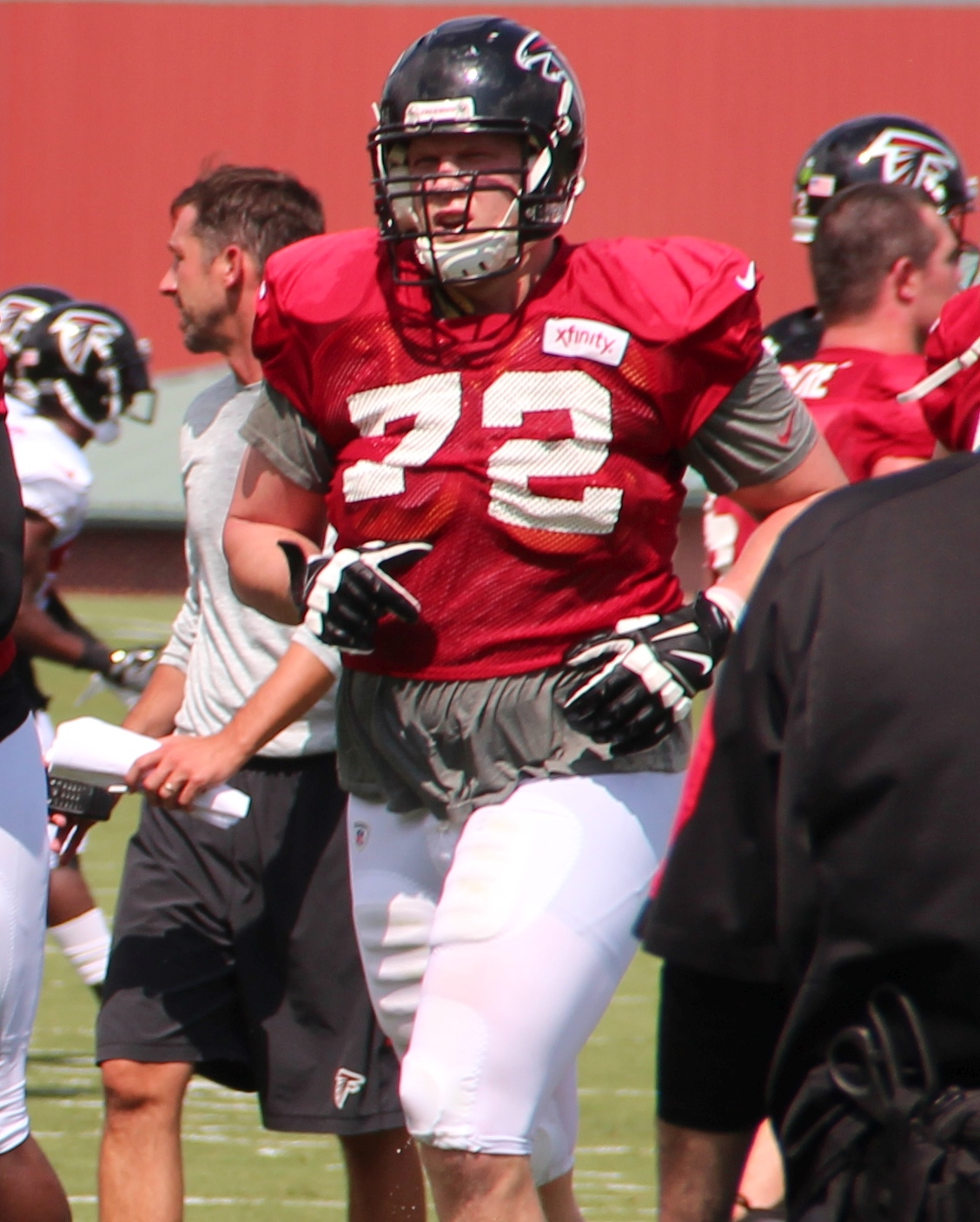
- Harris with the Atlanta Falcons in 2016

No. 72, 79
- Position: Offensive tackle

Personal information
- Born: January 16, 1989 (age 37); Bakersfield, California, U.S.
- Listed height: 6 ft 6 in (1.98 m)
- Listed weight: 300 lb (136 kg)

Career information
- High school: Tulare Union (Tulare, California)
- College: Fresno State
- NFL draft: 2012: undrafted

Career history
- Atlanta Falcons (2012)*; New Orleans Saints (2012–2014); Atlanta Falcons (2015); Jacksonville Jaguars (2016); Miami Dolphins (2016); New Orleans Saints (2017); Detroit Lions (2017); San Francisco 49ers (2017); New Orleans Saints (2017); Pittsburgh Steelers (2018)*
- * Offseason or practice squad member only

Awards and highlights
- First-team All-WAC (2011)

Career NFL statistics
- Games played: 38
- Games started: 4
- Stats at Pro Football Reference

Bryce Harris (born January 16, 1989) is an American former professional football player who was an offensive tackle in the National Football League (NFL). He played college football for the Fresno State Bulldogs.

== Professional career ==
=== Atlanta Falcons ===
On May 2, 2012, Harris signed with the Atlanta Falcons as an undrafted free agent. On August 31, 2012, he was released and subsequently signed to the team's practice squad the next day.

=== New Orleans Saints ===
Harris signed with the New Orleans Saints to join the active roster from the Atlanta Falcons practice squad. On November 25, 2012, he made his NFL Debut against the San Francisco 49ers, but was unable to finish the game due getting injured in the first quarter. On November 27, 2012, he was placed on Injured Reserve due to his broken leg injury.

The Saints re-signed Harris on March 20, 2015.

=== Second stint with the Falcons ===
Harris was claimed off waivers by the Atlanta Falcons on September 6, 2015, after being released by the Saints the previous day.

On September 3, 2016, Harris was released by the Falcons.

=== Jacksonville Jaguars ===
On October 5, 2016, Harris was signed by the Jaguars. He was released by the Jaguars on November 18, 2016.

=== Miami Dolphins ===
Harris was claimed off waivers the Dolphins on November 21, 2016. He was released on December 6, 2016.

=== Second stint with the Saints ===
On May 22, 2017, Harris signed with the New Orleans Saints. He was released on September 11, 2017, but was re-signed the next day. He was released on September 25, 2017. He was re-signed on October 13, 2017, only to be released four days later.

=== Detroit Lions ===
On October 18, 2017, Harris signed with the Detroit Lions. He was released on October 26, 2017.

=== San Francisco 49ers ===
On November 1, 2017, Harris signed with San Francisco 49ers on a one-year deal, but was released three days later.

=== Third stint with the Saints ===
On November 6, 2017, Harris was claimed off waivers by the Saints. He was released on November 18, 2017, but re-signed 11 days later. He was released again on December 12, 2017. He was re-signed again on January 10, 2018.

=== Pittsburgh Steelers ===
On June 4, 2018, Harris signed with the Pittsburgh Steelers on a one-year deal. He was waived with a non-football illness designation on July 26, 2018.
