= Fivepenny (disambiguation) =

Fivepenny refers to one of the many villages in the Lewis district of Ness (Nis in Gaelic) and part of the Isle of Lewis, Outer Hebrides, Scotland

Fivepenny may refer to:

- Fivepenny Piece, five-piece English musical folk band
- The Five Pennies, 1959 film starring Danny Kaye
- Red Nichols and His Five Pennies band

== See also ==
- Twopenny (disambiguation)
- Tenpenny (disambiguation)
