= Robbie Rouse =

American gridiron football player (born 1991)

South Dakota State Jackrabbits
- Title: Running backs coach

Personal information
- Born: February 5, 1991 (age 35); San Diego, California, U.S.
- Listed height: 5 ft 6 in (1.68 m)
- Listed weight: 190 lb (86 kg)

Career information
- High school: San Diego (CA) James Madison
- College: Fresno State
- NFL draft: 2013: undrafted

Career history

Playing
- Cleveland Browns (2013)*; Edmonton Eskimos (2013)*; Nebraska Danger (2015); Iowa Barnstormers (2015–2016); Sioux Falls Storm (2017)
- * Offseason or practice squad member only

Coaching
- College of St. Scholastica (2017) Running backs coach / Tight ends coach / Wide receivers coach / Returners coach; Augustana (SD) (2019) Running backs coach; North Dakota (2020–2021) Running backs coach; Cal Poly (2022) Running backs coach; South Dakota State (2023–present) Running backs coach

Awards and highlights
- First-team All-WAC (2011)

Robbie Rouse (born February 5, 1991) is an American former football running back. He played his college football at Fresno State University. Since 2023, he currently serves as the running backs coach for the South Dakota State Jackrabbits football team.

== Early life ==
Rouse grew up in San Diego, California, and played high school football at James Madison High School.

== College career ==
Rouse played college football as a running back for the Fresno State Bulldogs football team from 2009 to 2012. He totaled 479 rushing yards as a freshman in 2009 and 1,129 as a sophomore in 2010.

As a junior, Rouse rushed for 1,549 yards and 13 touchdowns during the 2011 season. He ranked fifth among NCAA Football Bowl Subdivision players in rushing yards during the 2011 regular season. He rushed for over 100 yards in eight of 12 games in 2011, including a season-high 176 yards against Hawaii on November 19, 2011, 172 yards against Nevada on October 22, 2011, and 169 yards against Nebraska on September 10, 2011.

As a senior in 2012, Rouse rushed for 1,490 yards and 12 touchdowns on 282 carries for an average of 5.3 yards per carry. He also caught 63 passes for 435 yards during the 2012 season, bringing his combined rushing/receiving total to 2,125 yards. He became the first Fresno State player to have three 1,000-yard seasons.

In four years at Fresno State, Rouse rushed for a total of 4,647 yards and 37 rushing touchdowns. He also had 794 receiving yards, five receiving touchdowns, and one passing touchdown. He is Fresno State's all-time career rushing leader.

== Professional career ==
Rouse was not drafted in the 2013 NFL draft but signed as a free agent with the Cleveland Browns. He was released on May 21, 2013. Rouse signed with the Edmonton Eskimos on October 2, 2013. In 2015, Rouse signed with the Nebraska Danger of the Indoor Football League. On April 6, 2015, Rouse was released by the Danger. On April 8, 2015, Rouse signed with the Iowa Barnstormers. On September 11, 2015, Rouse re-signed with the Barnstormers for the 2015 season.
