= Davonte Wallace =

American gridiron football player (born 1991)

No. 64
- Position: Offensive tackle

Personal information
- Born: December 21, 1991 (age 34); El Paso, Texas, U.S.
- Listed height: 6 ft 3 in (1.91 m)
- Listed weight: 308 lb (140 kg)

Career information
- High school: El Paso (TX) Irvin
- College: New Mexico State
- NFL draft: 2014: undrafted

Career history
- Miami Dolphins (2014–2015); Carolina Panthers (2015); Toronto Argonauts (2016–2017)

Awards and highlights
- 2× First-team All-WAC (2011, 2012)
- Stats at Pro Football Reference
- Stats at CFL.ca

Davonte Wallace (born December 21, 1991) is an American former professional football offensive tackle. He played college football at New Mexico State University for the New Mexico State Aggies.

== Professional career ==
=== Miami Dolphins ===
On May 12, 2015, Wallace was signed as an undrafted free agent. On July 29, 2015, he was waived. On July 30, 2015, he was placed on injured reserve. On April 22, 2015, Wallace was waived.

=== Carolina Panthers ===
On July 28, 2015, Wallace was signed by the Carolina Panthers. On September 1, 2015, he was waived/injured. On September 2, 2015, he was placed on injured reserve after going unclaimed on waivers. On November 23, 2015, he was waived from injured reserve.
