= 2012 Western Athletic Conference football season =

2012 WAC football season
- League: NCAA Division I Football Bowl Subdivision
- Sport: Football
- Duration: August 30, 2012 through December 27, 2012
- Teams: 7
- TV partner: ESPN

2013 NFL Draft
- Top draft pick: CB Will Davis, USU
- Picked by: Miami Dolphins, 93rd overall

Regular Season
- Champions: Utah State
- Season MVP: QB Colby Cameron, La. Tech; DL Travis Johnson, SJSU

Football seasons
- 2011 2021

2012 Western Athletic Conference football standings
	Conf.			Overall
Team	W		L	W		L
No. 16 Utah State $	6	–	0	11	–	2
No. 21 San Jose State	5	–	1	11	–	2
Louisiana Tech	4	–	2	9	–	3
UTSA *	3	–	3	8	–	4
Texas State *	2	–	4	4	–	8
Idaho	1	–	5	1	–	11
New Mexico State	0	–	6	1	–	11
$ – Conference champion; * Texas State and UTSA were not eligible for conference title or bowl games as part of their transition to the FBS.; Rankings from AP Poll

The 2012 Western Athletic Conference football season was the 51st and final college football season for the Western Athletic Conference in the top level of NCAA football, known since 2006 as Division I FBS. Seven teams competed in the 2012 season: Idaho, Louisiana Tech, New Mexico State, San Jose State, Texas State, Utah State, and UTSA. Utah State went undefeated against its conference opponents to become, at the time, the final WAC conference champion. It was also chosen to represent the WAC in one of its two bowl berths; conference runner-up San Jose State was chosen to fill the conference's other bowl berth.

Due to a major wave of departures that hit the WAC hard over the previous three seasons, the 2012 WAC football season marked what was at that time the conference's final season sponsoring football. Before the season began, San Jose State and Utah State announced they would be leaving to join several other former WAC schools in the Mountain West Conference. Louisiana Tech and UTSA joined several other schools in moving to Conference USA after the season, which also contains several former WAC members. Texas State moved to the Sun Belt Conference. Idaho and New Mexico State joined Notre Dame, Army, Navy, and BYU as FBS independents for 2013 before becoming Sun Belt football-only members in 2014 (Idaho left the WAC entirely as part of the realignment; while electing to keep their football team as a Bowl Subdivision member, the Vandals returned to the Big Sky Conference for other sports).

The WAC reinstated football in the fall 2021 season, but at the second level of NCAA football, Division I FCS. For more information on the revival of WAC football, see the section of the main conference page that discusses this development.

== Rankings ==
Legend
	Improvement in ranking
	Drop in ranking
	Not ranked previous week
RV	Received votes but were not ranked in Top 25 of poll

Ranking Movement
		Pre	Wk 1	Wk 2	Wk 3	Wk 4	Wk 5	Wk 6	Wk 7	Wk 8	Wk 9	Wk 10	Wk 11	Wk 12	Wk 13	Wk 14	Final
Idaho Vandals	AP																
Idaho Vandals	C																
Idaho Vandals	HAR	Not released															
Idaho Vandals	BCS	Not released															
Louisiana Tech Bulldogs	AP	RV				RV	RV	23	RV	24	22	19	19	RV			
Louisiana Tech Bulldogs	C	RV	RV	RV	RV	RV	RV	24	RV	RV	23	18	19	RV	RV	RV	RV
Louisiana Tech Bulldogs	HAR	Not released						24	RV	RV	24	19	20	RV	RV	RV	
Louisiana Tech Bulldogs	BCS	Not released									25	20	20				
New Mexico State Aggies	AP																
New Mexico State Aggies	C																
New Mexico State Aggies	HAR	Not released															
New Mexico State Aggies	BCS	Not released															
San Jose State Spartans	AP												RV	RV	RV	24	21
San Jose State Spartans	C				RV	RV	RV	RV						RV	RV	24	21
San Jose State Spartans	HAR	Not released										RV	RV	RV	RV	RV	
San Jose State Spartans	BCS	Not released													25	24	
Texas State Bobcats	AP		RV														
Texas State Bobcats	C																
Texas State Bobcats	HAR	Not released															
Texas State Bobcats	BCS	Not released															
Utah State Aggies	AP		RV	RV								RV	RV	25	20	18	16
Utah State Aggies	C										RV	RV	RV	RV	22	20	17
Utah State Aggies	HAR	Not released									RV	RV	RV	RV	22	21	
Utah State Aggies	BCS	Not released													24	22	
UTSA Roadrunners	AP																
UTSA Roadrunners	C																
UTSA Roadrunners	HAR	Not released															
UTSA Roadrunners	BCS	Not released															

== Regular season ==
Index to colors and formatting
WAC member won
WAC member lost
WAC teams in **bold**

=== Week One ===
Date	Time	Visiting team	Home team	Site	TV	Result	Attendance	Ref.
August 30	6:00 pm	Southern Utah	**Utah State**	Romney Stadium • Logan, UT	KMYU/ESPN3	**W** 34-3	17,009	
August 30	6:00 pm	No. 12 (FCS) Eastern Washington	**Idaho**	Kibbie Dome • Moscow, ID	ESPN3	**L** 3-20	11,136	
August 30	6:00 pm	Sacramento State	**New Mexico State**	Aggie Memorial Stadium • Las Cruces, NM	ESPN3	**W** 49-19	12,118	
August 31	7:00 pm	**San Jose State**	No. 21 Stanford	Stanford Stadium • Stanford, CA	P12N	**L** 17-20	40,577	
September 1	1:00 pm	**UTSA**	South Alabama	Ladd–Peebles Stadium • Mobile, AL	ESPN3	**W** 33-31	17,144	
September 1	7:00 pm	**Texas State**	Houston	Robertson Stadium • Houston, TX	CSS	**W** UH 30-13	32,207	
^{#}Rankings from AP Poll released prior to game.

=== Week Two ===
Date	Time	Visiting team	Home team	Site	TV	Result	Attendance	Ref.
September 8	6:00 pm	**Louisiana Tech**	Houston	Robertson Stadium • Houston, TX	CBSSN	**W** 56-49	29,142	
^{#}Rankings from AP Poll released prior to game.

== All-WAC Teams ==
=== First Team ===
Offense
QB Colby Cameron–Louisiana Tech
RB Kenneth Dixon–Louisiana Tech
RB Kerwynn Williams–Utah State
WR Quinton Patton–Louisiana Tech
WR Austin Franklin–New Mexico State
TE Ryan Otten–San Jose State
OL Steven Warner–Louisiana Tech
OL David Quessenberry–San Jose State
OL Tyler Larsen–Utah State
OL Davonte Wallace–New Mexico State
OL Eric Schultz–Utah State

Defense
DL Travis Johnson–San Jose State
DL Travis Raciti–San Jose State
DL Anthony Larceval–San Jose State
DL IK Enemkpali–Louisiana Tech
LB Trashaun Nixon–New Mexico State
LB Keith Smith–San Jose State
LB Kyler Fackrell–Utah State
DB Bené Benwikere–San Jose State
DB Will Davis–Utah State
DB Gary Walker–Idaho
DB Dave Clark–Louisiana Tech

Specialists
PK Austin Lopez–San Jose State
P Ryan Allen–Louisiana Tech
KR D. J. Banks–Louisiana Tech
PR Cameron Webb-Utah State

=== Second Team ===
Offense
QB Chuckie Keeton–Utah State
RB De'Leon Eskridge–San Jose State
RB Ray Holley–Louisiana Tech
WR Myles White–Louisiana Tech
WR Chandler Jones–San Jose State
WR Kermonte Bartlett–New Mexico State
TE Kellen Bartlett–Utah State
OL Jordan Mills–Louisiana Tech
OL Scott Inskeep–UTSA
OL Oscar Johnson–Louisiana Tech
OL Mike Marboe–Idaho
OL Nicholas Kaspar–San Jose State

Defense
DL David Tuitupou–San Jose State
DL Jordan Nielsen–Utah State
DL Franky Anaya–UTSA
DL Al Lapuaho–Utah State
LB Vince Buhagiar–San Jose State
LB Jake Doughty–Utah State
LB Brandon Reeves–UTSA
LB Joplo Bartu–Texas State
DB Jeremy Harris–New Mexico State
DB Chad Boyd–Louisiana Tech
DB David Cazares–New Mexico State
DB Triston Wade–UTSA

Specialists
PK Trey Farquhar–Idaho
P Cayle Chapman-Brown–New Mexico State
KR Chuck Jacobs–Utah State
PR D.J. Banks-Louisiana Tech

=== Players of the year ===
Offense
Colby Cameron–Louisiana Tech

Defense
Travis Johnson–San Jose State

Freshman
Kenneth Dixon–Louisiana Tech

=== Coach of the year ===
Gary Andersen–Utah State

== Bowl games ==
Bowl Game	Date	Site	Television	Time (EST)	Visiting Team	Home Team	Score	Attendance
Famous Idaho Potato Bowl	December 15	Bronco Stadium * Boise, ID	ESPN	4:30 p.m.	Toledo	Utah State	15-41	29,243
Military Bowl	December 27	RFK Stadium * Washington, D.C.	ESPN	3:00 p.m.	San Jose State	Bowling Green	29-20	17,835

== Home attendance ==
Team	Stadium (Capacity)	Game 1	Game 2	Game 3	Game 4	Game 5	Game 6	Total	Average	% of Capacity
Idaho	Kibbie Dome (16,000)	11,136	13,558	14,755			—			
Louisiana Tech	Joe Aillet Stadium (30,600)	23,228	21,850	40,453^{A}	20,255	23,645	25,614			
New Mexico State	Aggie Memorial Stadium (30,343)	12,118	25,211	14,341	12,118					
San Jose State	Spartan Stadium (30,456)	7,462	7,189	15,168	7,093	15,494				
Texas State	Bobcat Stadium (30,000)	33,006	17,188	14,210	16,973					
Utah State	Romney Stadium (25,513)	17,009	25,513	24,226	17,001					
UTSA	Alamodome (65,000)	30,416	25,742	30,862	23,519	25,784	39,032			

^ALouisiana Tech's home game against Texas A&M was played at the 49,427-seat Independence Stadium in Shreveport.

== NFL draft ==
The following list includes all WAC players who were drafted in the 2013 NFL draft.

Round #	Pick #	NFL team	Player	Position	College
3	93	Miami Dolphins	Will Davis	CB	Utah State
4	128	San Francisco 49ers	Quinton Patton	WR	Louisiana Tech
5	159	Green Bay Packers	Jordan Mills	T	Louisiana Tech
6	176	Houston Texans	David Quessenberry	T	San Jose State
7	208	Jacksonville Jaguars	Jeremy Harris	CB	New Mexico State
7	230	Indianapolis Colts	Kerwynn Williams	RB	Utah State
