= Jeremy Harris (American football) =

American football player (born 1991)

No. 31, 37
- Position: Cornerback

Personal information
- Born: April 26, 1991 (age 35); Los Angeles, California, U.S.
- Listed height: 6 ft 2 in (1.88 m)
- Listed weight: 195 lb (88 kg)

Career information
- High school: Susan Miller Dorsey (Los Angeles)
- College: New Mexico State
- NFL draft: 2013: 7th round, 208th overall pick

Career history
- Jacksonville Jaguars (2013–2014); Kansas City Chiefs (2015)*; New York Jets (2015)*; Washington Redskins (2015); BC Lions (2016)*; Winnipeg Blue Bombers (2017)*
- * Offseason or practice squad member only

Awards and highlights
- Second-team All-WAC (2012)

Career NFL statistics
- Total tackles: 6
- Stats at Pro Football Reference

Jeremy Harris (born April 26, 1991) is an American former professional football player who was a cornerback in the National Football League (NFL). He was selected by the Jacksonville Jaguars in the seventh round (208th overall) of the 2013 NFL draft. He played college football for the New Mexico State Aggies, where he was coached by Jaguars defensive backs coach DeWayne Walker and defensive assistant Mike Rutenberg. Prior to playing for New Mexico State, Harris played for East Los Angeles Community College.

== Professional career ==
Pre-draft measurables
Height	Weight	Arm length	Hand span	40-yard dash	10-yard split	20-yard split	20-yard shuttle	Three-cone drill	Vertical jump	Broad jump	Bench press
6 ft 2 3/8 in (1.89 m)	181 lb (82 kg)	34 1/2 in (0.88 m)	9 1/4 in (0.23 m)	4.48 s	1.59 s	2.61 s	4.08 s	6.99 s	36.5 in (0.93 m)	10 ft 5 in (3.18 m)	5 reps
All values from Pro Day

=== Jacksonville Jaguars ===
Harris was placed on injured reserve on August 25, 2013, ending his rookie season. In the 2014 season, Harris made his NFL debut against the Philadelphia Eagles on September 7, 2014. He was released on September 4, 2015.

=== Kansas City Chiefs ===
Harris was signed on September 8, 2015, to the practice squad by the Kansas City Chiefs. On October 13, 2015, was released by the Chiefs.

=== New York Jets ===
Harris was signed by the New York Jets to their practice squad on October 20, 2015. On November 13, he was released from practice squad.

=== Washington Redskins ===
On November 30, 2015, Harris was signed to the Washington Redskins' practice squad. On December 29, 2015, he was promoted to the active roster. On August 27, 2016, Harris was waived by the Redskins.

=== BC Lions ===
On September 19, 2016, Harris signed onto the practice squad of the BC Lions of the Canadian Football League. He was released by the Lions on November 1, 2016.

=== Winnipeg Blue Bombers ===
On January 24, 2017, Harris signed with the Winnipeg Blue Bombers. He was released on May 1, 2017.
