= Twopenny =

Twopenny may refer to:

- the British coin: see History of the British penny (1901–1970)
- Richard Twopenny, Australian journalist and journalist
- Twopenny (cricketer) (c. 1845 – 1883), the first Aboriginal Australian to play first-class cricket
- Twopenny Tube, an underground "tube" railway in London
- Two Penny Act, enacted in 1758 by the Virginia General Assembly

== See also ==
- Fivepenny (disambiguation)
- Tenpenny (disambiguation)
