= Travis Johnson (linebacker) =

American football player (born 1991)

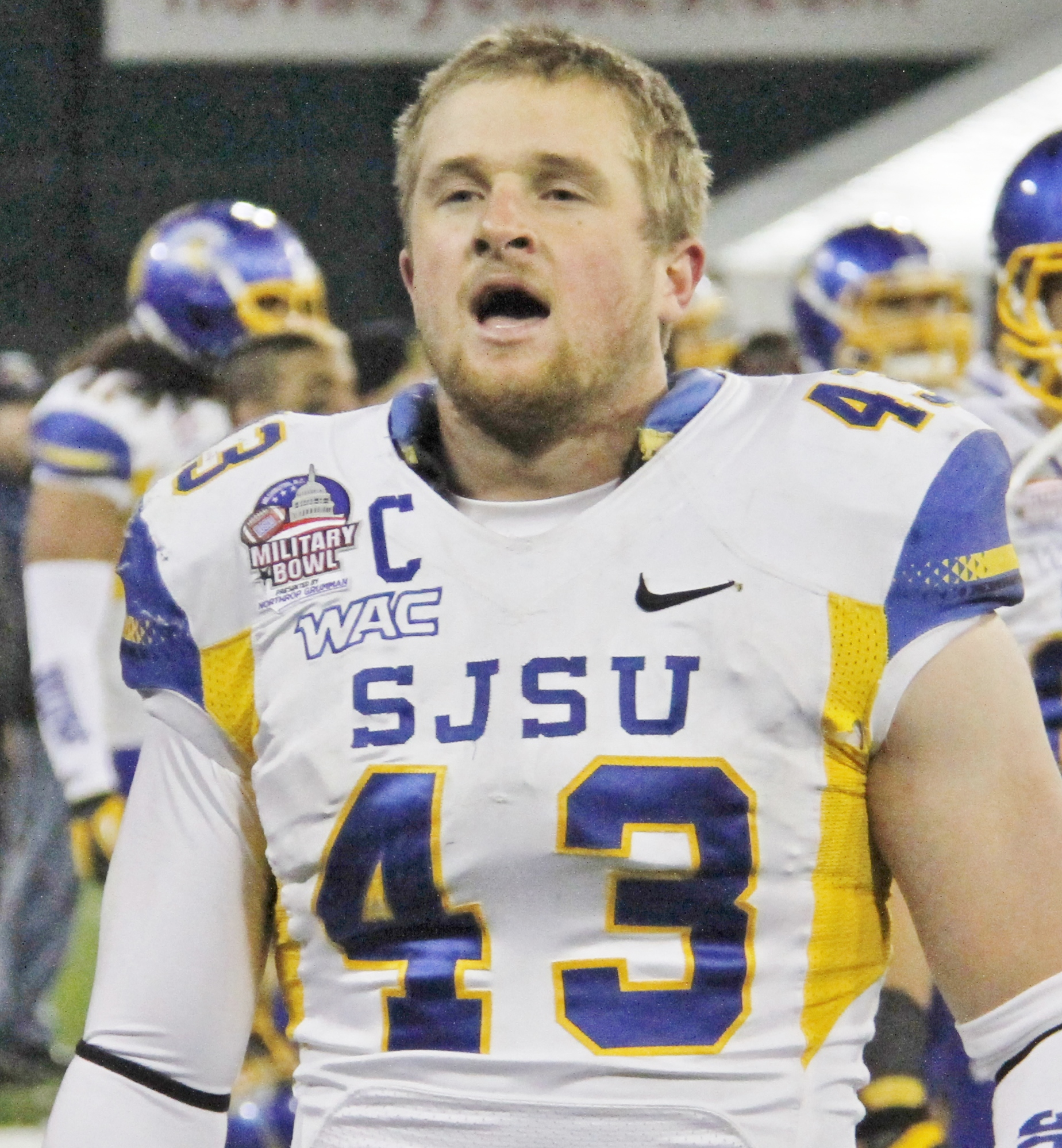
- Johnson at the 2012 Military Bowl with San Jose State

Profile
- Position: Linebacker

Personal information
- Born: June 28, 1991 (age 35); San Jose, California, U.S.
- Listed height: 6 ft 2 in (1.88 m)
- Listed weight: 240 lb (109 kg)

Career information
- High school: The King's Academy (Sunnyvale, California)
- College: San Jose State
- NFL draft: 2013: undrafted

Career history
- San Francisco 49ers (2013)*
- * Offseason or practice squad member only

Awards and highlights
- Third-team All-American (2012); WAC Defensive Player of the Year (2012); 2× First-team All-WAC (2011, 2012); Military Bowl champion (2012)

Travis Freeman Johnson (born June 28, 1991) is an American former college football player who was a linebacker for the San Jose State Spartans. He tried out with the San Francisco 49ers of the National Football League (NFL) in 2013.

== Early life ==
Born in San Jose, Johnson graduated from The King's Academy in nearby Sunnyvale, California in 2009 and is an Eagle Scout. He had 38 sacks in his final two seasons of high school.

College recruiting
Name	Hometown	School	Height	Weight	40^{‡}	Commit date
Travis Johnson; DE	Sunnyvale, CA	The King's Academy	6 ft 0 in (1.83 m)	230 lb (100 kg)	4.86	Feb 4, 2009
Travis Johnson; DE	Recruit ratings: Scout: Rivals: 247Sports:					
Overall recruit ranking: Scout: 124 (DE), 92 (school) Rivals: 87 (school) 247Sports: 102 (WDE), 202 (CA)
‡ Refers to 40-yard dash; Note: In many cases, Scout, Rivals, 247Sports, On3, and ESPN may conflict in their listings of height, weight and 40 time.; In these cases, the average was taken. ESPN grades are on a 100-point scale.; Sources: "San Jose St. Football Commitment List". Rivals.; "San Jose State College Football Team Recruiting Prospects". Scout.; "Scout.com Team Recruiting Rankings". Scout.; "2009 Team Ranking". Rivals.com.; "San Jose State 2009 Football Commits". 247Sports.

== College career ==
He played college football at San José State University. In his freshman season, he played in 12 games in which he made 18 tackles and two sacks. In his sophomore season, he played and started in all 13 games and recorded 62 tackles and 7.5 sacks.

In his junior season of 2011, he played and started in all 12 games in which he recorded 73 tackles and 9.5 sacks. He was nominated to the Hendricks Award Watch List for the best defensive end. He was selected to the First-team All-WAC defensive lineman. In his senior season, 65 tackles, a career high 13 sacks, 3 forced fumbles, and 2 pass deflections. On October 14, 2011, in a 28-27 victory over Hawaii nationally televised on ESPN, Johnson blocked an extra point and a field goal by Hawaii. Duke Ihenacho returned the blocked extra point all the way to the Hawaii end zone for a two-point defensive conversion.

Johnson ended his senior year with multiple conference and national honors, including CBS Sports third-team All-American, Sports Illustrated honorable mention All-American, Western Athletic Conference (WAC) Defensive Player of the Year, first-team All-WAC, and second-team Academic All-American. He also won the National Football Foundation Scholar-Athlete Award after his senior season. He finished his college career with a total of 218 Tackles, 32 Sacks, 3 Forced fumbles and 2 Pass deflections. He was invited and played in the 2013 East-West Shrine Game on the west team and the 2013 Senior Bowl. Johnson graduated from San Jose State in 2013 with a Bachelor of Science degree in kinesiology. Johnson is also a member of the Fellowship of Christian Athletes.

== Professional career ==
Pre-draft measurables
Height	Weight	Arm length	Hand span	Wingspan	40-yard dash	10-yard split	20-yard split	20-yard shuttle	Three-cone drill	Vertical jump	Broad jump	Bench press
6 ft 1 7/8 in (1.88 m)	240 lb (109 kg)	31 1/2 in (0.80 m)	9 5/8 in (0.24 m)	6 ft 5 1/2 in (1.97 m)	4.86 s	1.66 s	2.78 s	4.44 s	7.18 s	32.0 in (0.81 m)	9 ft 0 in (2.74 m)	19 reps
All values from Pro Day

Johnson was not selected in the 2013 NFL draft. Following the draft, Johnson joined New York Jets rookie minicamp.

On July 30, 2013, the San Francisco 49ers signed linebacker Travis Johnson to a three-year deal. The 49ers waived Johnson on August 31, 2013. Johnson had 6 tackles and 1 sack during the preseason.
