= Douglas High School (Minden, Nevada) =

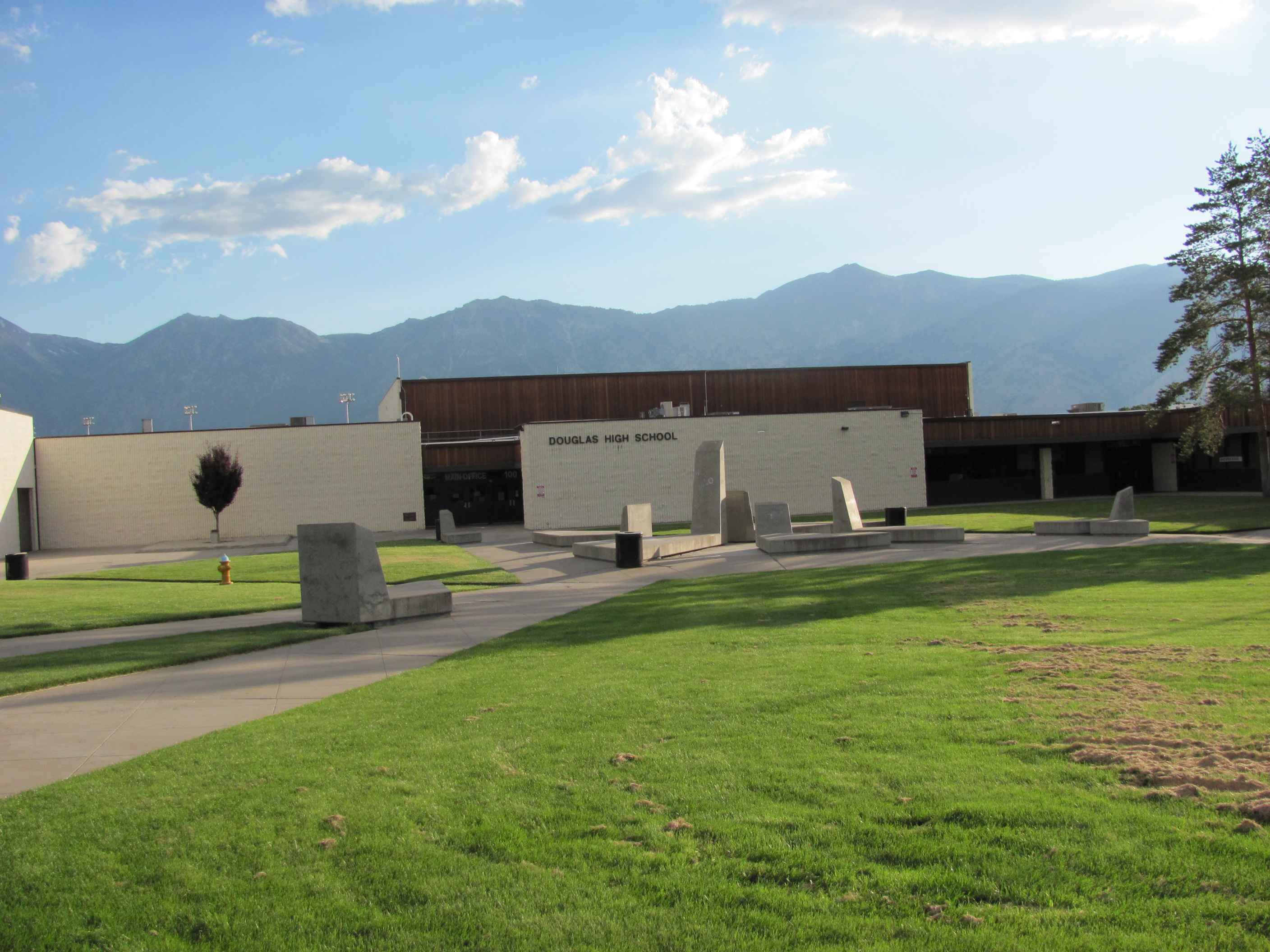

Location
- 1670 Highway 88; Minden, Nevada 89423; United States; 38.958°N 119.780°W

Information
- Type: Public
- Principal: Mike Rechs
- Teaching staff: 75.50 (FTE)
- Enrollment: 1,510 (2024–2025)
- Student to teacher ratio: 20.00
- Color
- Mascot: Tiger
- Rival: Carson High School
- Website: https://dhs.dcsd.net

Douglas High School (DHS) is a public secondary school in Minden, Nevada, U.S., in the Douglas County School District. The school has existed at a number of locations during its history, including the site of the current Carson Valley Middle School. It has been located on Highway 88 in Minden since 1976.

In May 2014, the campus underwent a major remodel that lasted through the summer of 2015. The remodel reworked the entire front end of the school, adding a two-story Science, Technology, Engineering and Mathematics (S.T.E.M.) building to the front of the campus.

In April 2025, the school is receiving $1.1 million in stadium improvements, including upgrading the 1980s-era restrooms to ADA compliance, replacing illegal wooden partitions, fixing failing bleacher foundations, and modernizing the electrical system that previously caused a homecoming game power outage.

== Notable alumni ==
- Shawn Estes – professional baseball pitcher
- Jeff Nady – NFL offensive lineman
- Tom Newell – professional baseball pitcher
- Glen Orbik – artist and comics illustrator
- Krysta Palmer – Olympic bronze medal-winning diver at the 2020 Summer Olympics
- RAS – songwriter and producer
- Eric Whitacre – choral composer and conductor
