= Will Davis (cornerback) =

American football player (born 1990)

No. 29, 39, 31
- Position: Cornerback

Personal information
- Born: May 8, 1990 (age 36); Torrance, California, U.S.
- Listed height: 5 ft 11 in (1.80 m)
- Listed weight: 186 lb (84 kg)

Career information
- High school: Spokane Valley (WA) Central Valley
- College: Utah State
- NFL draft: 2013: 3rd round, 93rd overall pick

Career history
- Miami Dolphins (2013–2015); Baltimore Ravens (2015–2016); San Francisco 49ers (2017)*; Salt Lake Stallions (2019)
- * Offseason or practice squad member only

Awards and highlights
- First-team All-WAC (2012)

Career NFL statistics
- Total tackles: 30
- Pass deflections: 5
- Interceptions: 1
- Stats at Pro Football Reference

Will Davis (born May 8, 1990) is an American former professional football player who was a cornerback in the National Football League (NFL). He was selected by the Miami Dolphins in the third round of the 2013 NFL draft. He played college football for the Utah State Aggies.

== Early life ==
Davis was born in Compton, California May 8, 1990 to Shon Davis and Francis Watkins. His father is a pastor in Spokane, Washington, and his mother resides in Los Angeles, California. His parents are divorced. He has an older brother Shon Davis who is a business man in Los Angeles.

He was raised in Spokane, Washington. He was a second-team all-Greater Spokane League selection in his only year of football at Central Valley High School in the Spokane Valley, logging seven interceptions, while also tallying 33 tackles, two forced fumbles and one fumble recovery. He also played wide receiver, making 16 catches for 135 yards and four touchdowns. He earned three letters in basketball and four in track. He was an honorable mention all-league honoree and team MVP as a senior in basketball and was a two-year starter. As sophomore, he played on the team that was Class 4A state runner-up. He placed third in triple jump at state track meet as a senior and was regional champion as junior, and had a personal record triple jump of 46–0.

== College career ==
Davis originally attended Western Washington University, but the university disbanded the football program after his redshirt season in 2008. He then enrolled at De Anza College, a community college located in Cupertino, California. He earned first-team all-Golden Gate Conference and first-team all-state honors after posting eight interceptions, returning two for touchdowns. The eight interceptions led the Northern California Football Association and he ranked tied for eighth in the National Club Football Association (NCFA) in passes defended with 1.55 per game, adding eight pass break-ups, and also tallied 38 tackles.

After the 2010 season, Davis transferred to Utah State University, where he played for the Utah State Aggies football team during the 2011 and 2012 seasons. He played in all 13 games in 2011, making five starts, while recording 35 tackles to rank 10th on the team. He finished the year tied for third on the team for pass break-ups with six as well as having 3.5 tackles for a loss to rank eighth on the team. In his senior season in 2012, he was named to the all-conference first team. Davis ranked first on the team in both interceptions (5) and passes defended (17) his 22 total passes defended (1.69 per game) ranked him second in the nation, he also finished eighth on the team with 47 tackles (33-solo), to go along with three quarterback hurries.

== Professional career ==
=== Miami Dolphins ===
Davis was selected by the Miami Dolphins in the third round, with the 93rd overall pick, of the 2013 NFL draft.

=== Baltimore Ravens ===
Davis was traded to the Baltimore Ravens on September 21, 2015. On October 11, 2015, in the 33–30 loss to the Cleveland Browns, Davis experienced a season-ending ACL tear in the first half of the game and was placed on injured reserve.

Davis was released by the Ravens on November 4, 2016.

=== San Francisco 49ers ===
On June 1, 2017, Davis signed with the San Francisco 49ers. He was released on September 1, 2017.

=== Salt Lake Stallions ===
On September 14, 2018, Davis signed with the Salt Lake Stallions of the Alliance of American Football for the 2019 season. The league ceased operations in April 2019.
