= Devon Wylie =

American gridiron football player (1988–2023)

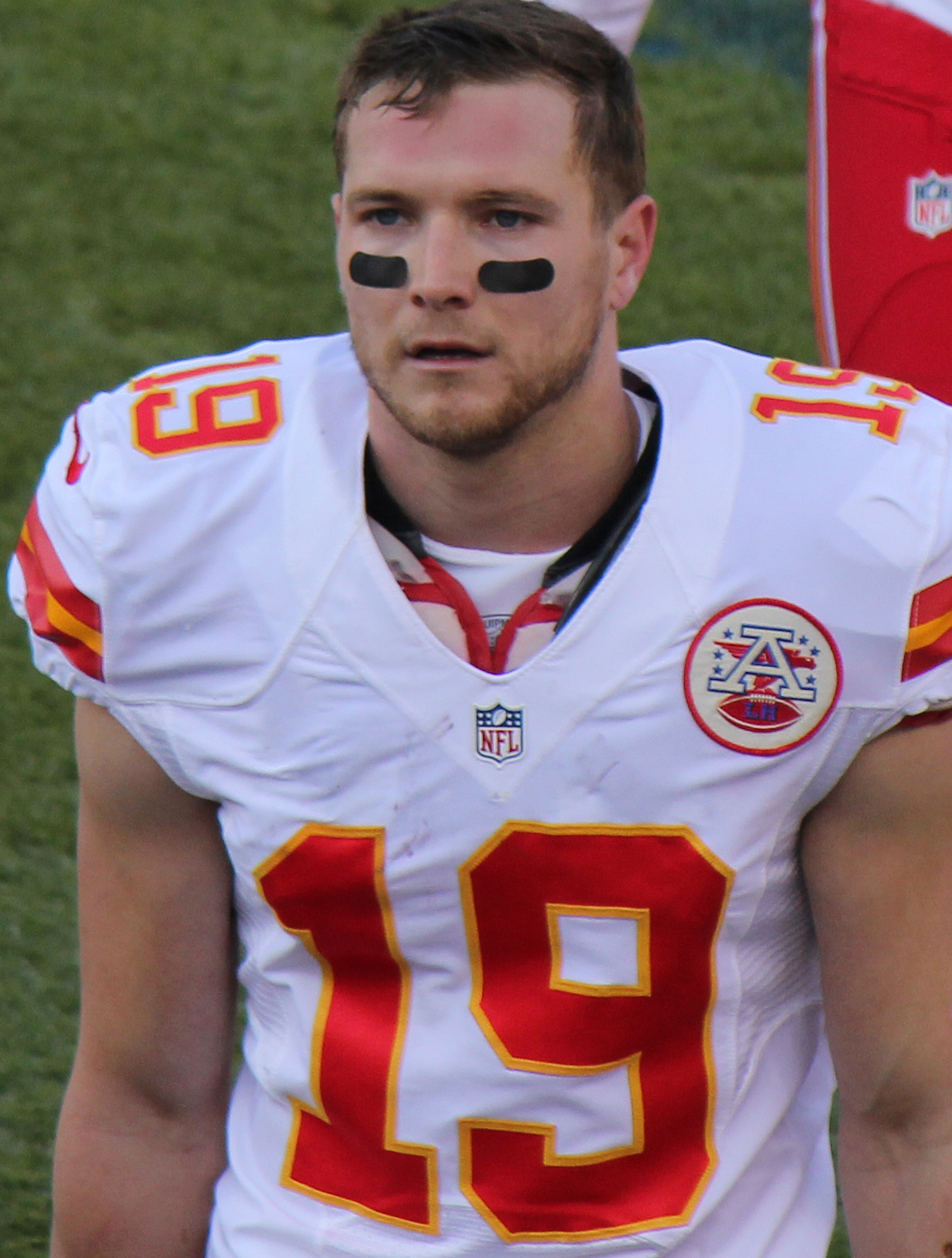
- Wylie with the Kansas City Chiefs in 2012

No. 19
- Positions: Wide receiver, kickoff returner

Personal information
- Born: September 2, 1988; Sacramento, California, U.S.
- Died: November 11, 2023 (aged 35)
- Listed height: 5 ft 9 in (1.75 m)
- Listed weight: 187 lb (85 kg)

Career information
- High school: Granite Bay (Granite Bay, California)
- College: Fresno State
- NFL draft: 2012: 4th round, 107th overall pick

Career history
- Kansas City Chiefs (2012); Arizona Cardinals (2013)*; Pittsburgh Steelers (2013)*; Tennessee Titans (2013); Seattle Seahawks (2013)*; San Francisco 49ers (2013–2014)*; St. Louis Rams (2014–2015)*; Oakland Raiders (2015)*; Atlanta Falcons (2015)*; Toronto Argonauts (2016–2017)
- * Offseason or practice squad member only

Awards and highlights
- First-team All-WAC (2011)

Career NFL statistics
- Receptions: 6
- Receiving yards: 53
- Return yards: 315
- Stats at Pro Football Reference

Devon Wylie (September 2, 1988 – November 11, 2023) was an American professional football wide receiver in the National Football League (NFL) and Canadian Football League (CFL). He played college football for the Fresno State Bulldogs. He was selected by the Kansas City Chiefs in the fourth round of the 2012 NFL draft.

== Early life ==
Wylie attended Granite Bay High School in Granite Bay, California.

== College career ==
Wylie attended California State University, Fresno from 2007 to 2011. He finished his college career with 98 receptions for 1,327 yards and eight touchdowns.

College statistics

Year	Games	Rec	Yds	TD	Long	Rec/G	Avg/G
2007	11	1	44	0	44	0.1	4.0
2008	9	22	269	2	47	2.4	29.9
2009	10	17	259	4	70	1.7	25.9
2010	1	2	39	1	28	2.0	39.0
2011	13	56	716	1	71	4.3	55.1
Total	44	98	1327	8	71	2.2	30.2

== Professional career ==
Pre-draft measurables
Height	Weight	Arm length	Hand span	40-yard dash	Vertical jump	Broad jump	Bench press
5 ft 9 in (1.75 m)	187 lb (85 kg)	30 1/4	9 1/2	4.37 s	39 in (0.99 m)	10 ft 3 in (3.12 m)	17 reps
All values from NFL Combine

=== Kansas City Chiefs ===
Wylie was selected by the Kansas City Chiefs in the fourth round of the 2012 NFL draft.

Wylie made the final roster for the Chiefs in 2012 and wore number 19. But he played in only six regular-season games, catching 6 passes for 53 yards. Wylie also was used occasionally as a kickoff and punt returner. However, Wylie was released on September 1, 2013, prior to the 2013 regular season.

=== Arizona Cardinals ===
Wylie was signed to the Arizona Cardinals' practice squad on September 25, 2013.

=== Tennessee Titans ===
Wylie signed to the Tennessee Titans practice squad November 6, 2013. After being promoted to the active roster, Wylie returned kickoffs and punts in two games with the Titans, but was released on November 26, 2013, after losing a fumble on a kickoff return in a loss to the Indianapolis Colts.

=== Seattle Seahawks ===
Wylie was signed to the Seattle Seahawks' practice squad on December 5, 2013. He was released on December 7, 2013.

=== San Francisco 49ers ===
Wylie signed to the San Francisco 49ers practice squad December 10, 2013. The 49ers waived Wylie on August 25, 2014.

=== St. Louis Rams ===
On October 21, 2014, Wylie was signed to the St. Louis Rams' practice squad. On December 30, 2014, he was signed a future contract. On August 4, 2015, he was waived.

=== Oakland Raiders ===
On August 18, 2015, Wylie was signed by the Oakland Raiders. On September 5, 2015, he was waived by the Raiders.

=== Atlanta Falcons ===
On October 27, 2015, Wylie was signed to the Atlanta Falcons' practice squad. On December 15, 2015, he was released from practice squad.

=== Toronto Argonauts ===
On April 21, 2016, Wylie signed with the Toronto Argonauts of the CFL. He was released on August 1, 2017.

== Death ==
On November 13, 2023, Wylie's family announced his death in a social media post. He was 35 years old. At the time of his death, he was homeless and living in a shopping center. An autopsy showed that he had stage 3 CTE.
