= Jalen Saunders =

American football player (born 1992)

No. 18, 16
- Position: Wide receiver

Personal information
- Born: September 30, 1992 (age 34); Stockton, California, U.S.
- Listed height: 5 ft 9 in (1.75 m)
- Listed weight: 165 lb (75 kg)

Career information
- High school: Pleasant Grove (Elk Grove, California)
- College: Fresno State; Oklahoma
- NFL draft: 2014: 4th round, 104th overall pick

Career history
- New York Jets (2014); Arizona Cardinals (2014)*; Seattle Seahawks (2014)*; New Orleans Saints (2014); New England Patriots (2015)*; Chicago Bears (2015)*; Hamilton Tiger-Cats (2017–2018); Houston Roughnecks (2020); Ottawa Redblacks (2020); Winnipeg Blue Bombers (2022)*
- * Offseason or practice squad member only

Awards and highlights
- First-team All-WAC (2011); Second-team All-Big 12 (2013)

Career NFL statistics
- Games played: 15
- Receptions: 1
- Receiving yards: 7
- Return yards: 245
- Stats at Pro Football Reference

Career CFL statistics
- Receptions: 121
- Receiving yards: 1,909
- Receiving touchdowns: 6
- Stats at CFL.ca

Jalen Saunders (born September 30, 1992) is an American former professional football player who was a wide receiver in the National Football League (NFL) and Canadian Football League (CFL). He was selected by the New York Jets in the fourth round of the 2014 NFL draft. Saunders was also a member of the Arizona Cardinals, Seattle Seahawks, New Orleans Saints, New England Patriots, Chicago Bears, Hamilton Tiger-Cats, Houston Roughnecks, Ottawa Redblacks and Winnipeg Blue Bombers. He played college football for the Fresno State Bulldogs and Oklahoma Sooners.

== Early life ==
Saunders attended Pleasant Grove High School in Elk Grove, California. He averaged nearly 19 yards per catch and scored 11 receiving touchdowns on 46 receptions as a senior with 871 yards receiving in 10 games. He also rushed for 410 yards and averaged eight yards per carry and scored six touchdowns.

He was also an outstanding sprinter, who clocked a 10.54 time in the 100 meters and a 21.41 in the 200 meters as a junior.

He was considered a three-star recruit by Rivals.com.

== College career ==
Saunders accepted a scholarship from Fresno State University. As a freshman with the Fresno State Bulldogs, he was third on the team in receptions with 27 for 441 yards and three touchdowns, and also had 14 carries for 109 yards on sweeps and reverses. In 2011, he was named first-team All-Western Athletic Conference (WAC) after he had 1,065 yards on the year on 50 receptions, the ninth 1,000-yard receiving season in Fresno State history. He led the WAC with 12 touchdown catches, which tied for the third-most in program history.

On May 8, 2012, he announced he was transferring to the University of Oklahoma, citing a change in offensive philosophy at Fresno State as the reason for his transfer. After originally being told he'd have to sit one year, he was cleared by the NCAA to play in 2012.

In his premier season with the Sooners, Saunders played in nine games with eight starts. Despite sitting out the first four games due to transferring, he totaled 62 receptions for 829 yards and three touchdowns. He tied a school record with 15 catches for 181 yards and set a school record with eight catches in the first quarter vs. Notre Dame (10/27). In 2013, he started all 13 games and was named second-team All-Big 12 Conference. He recorded 61 receptions for 729 yards and eight touchdowns, highlighted by a winning performance against Alabama in the Sugar Bowl, in which he recorded 5 receptions for 75 yards and two touchdowns.

== Professional career ==
Pre-draft measurables
Height	Weight	Arm length	Hand span	40-yard dash	Vertical jump	Broad jump	Wonderlic
5 ft 8 7/8 in (1.75 m)	165 lb (75 kg)	30 in (0.76 m)	8 7/8 in (0.23 m)	4.44 s	34.0 in (0.86 m)	10 ft 2 in (3.10 m)	16
All values from NFL Combine

=== New York Jets ===
He was selected by the New York Jets in the fourth round (104th overall) of the 2014 NFL draft. In 3 games with the Jets, Saunders returned 6 punts for 26 return yards. He was released by the Jets on September 29, 2014.

=== Arizona Cardinals ===
Saunders was signed to the practice squad of the Arizona Cardinals on October 1, 2014.

=== Seattle Seahawks ===
He was signed to the Seattle Seahawks' practice squad on November 4, 2014.

=== New Orleans Saints ===
The New Orleans Saints signed Saunders to their 53-man roster on November 19, 2014, just one day after placing fellow rookie Brandin Cooks on injured reserve.

=== New England Patriots ===
On September 1, 2015, the Saints traded Saunders to the New England Patriots for a conditional draft pick. He was released on September 5, 2015.

=== Chicago Bears ===
He was signed to the Chicago Bears' practice squad on September 7, 2015. Saunders was not offered a futures contract by the Bears after the 2015 NFL season.

Saunders was suspended for the first 10 games of the 2016 NFL season for violating the substance abuse policy.

=== Hamilton Tiger-Cats ===
During April 2017, Saunders participated in The Spring League, a startup developmental league who operates as a showcase for NFL and Canadian Football League (CFL) scouts.

Saunders was one of several Spring League players who signed with professional teams later in the year; in Saunders' case he signed with the Hamilton Tiger-Cats of the CFL. Despite being released after the preseason, Saunders was assigned to the Hamilton practice roster. After two weeks, Saunders was promoted to the active roster to take the place of star receiver Terrence Toliver, who suffered a torn ACL during Hamilton's opening game of the 2017 season. During his CFL debut on July 8, Saunders recorded 6 catches for 78 yards, making him the most productive receiver for the Ticats. Saunders also had one rush for a single yard in a losing effort against the Saskatchewan Roughriders. Saunders topped his performance the following week, again serving as Hamilton's most productive receiver by catching 5 passes for 147 yards and a touchdown in a loss to the BC Lions. In later weeks, Saunders was also used as a return specialist. During the 16 games he played in, Sanders made 76 catches for 1,170 yards and 4 touchdowns. The following year, Saunders was on pace for an outstanding year, but a season ending injury capped his 2018 production at 739 yards and 2 touchdowns on 45 catches during 9 games played. On December 21, 2018, Saunders and the Tiger-Cats agreed to a contract extension, preventing him from becoming a free agent two months later. On May 16, 2019, just prior to training camp for the 2019 season, Saunders was cut by the Tiger-Cats.

=== Houston Roughnecks ===
Houston Roughnecks coach June Jones, Saunders's coach in Hamilton, selected Saunders in the seventh round of phase one of the 2020 XFL draft. He was placed on injured reserve before the start of the regular season on January 21, 2020. He had his contract terminated when the league suspended operations on April 10, 2020.

=== Ottawa Redblacks ===
On April 21, 2020, Saunders signed with the Ottawa Redblacks of the CFL. After the CFL canceled the 2020 season due to the COVID-19 pandemic, Saunders chose to opt-out of his contract with the Redblacks on August 28, 2020. He re-signed with Ottawa on January 11, 2021. Saunders was involved in a car accident in May 2021. He retired from football on June 15, 2021.

=== Winnipeg Blue Bombers ===
On April 14, 2022, Saunders came out of retirement and signed a two-year contract with the CFL's Winnipeg Blue Bombers. However, he was released in the early stages of training camp on May 25, 2022. On May 26, 2022, it was reported by the Winnipeg Free Press that the Bombers parted ways with Saunders after he allegedly sexually assaulted a 22-year old woman during the May holiday weekend.
