= Chris Barker (American football) =

American football player (born 1990)

No. 62, 64, 67
- Position: Offensive guard

Personal information
- Born: August 3, 1990 (age 36); Covina, California, U.S.
- Listed height: 6 ft 2 in (1.88 m)
- Listed weight: 300 lb (136 kg)

Career information
- High school: Etiwanda (CA)
- College: Nevada
- NFL draft: 2013: undrafted

Career history
- Miami Dolphins (2013)*; New England Patriots (2013–2016); Cleveland Browns (2017)
- * Offseason or practice squad member only

Awards and highlights
- 2× Super Bowl champion (XLIX, LI); First-team All-WAC (2011); Second-team All-WAC (2010)

Career NFL statistics
- Games played: 6
- Stats at Pro Football Reference

Chris Barker (born August 3, 1990) is an American former professional football player who was an offensive guard in the National Football League (NFL). He played college football for the Nevada Wolf Pack. He was signed by the Miami Dolphins as an undrafted free agent in 2013.

== Professional career ==
=== Miami Dolphins ===
On May 3, 2013, he signed with the Miami Dolphins as an undrafted free agent. On August 31, 2013, he was released.

=== New England Patriots ===
On September 1, 2013, Barker was claimed off waivers by the New England Patriots. On September 1, 2014, Barker was waived by the New England Patriots and was re-signed to the practice squad. On October 16, Barker was elevated to the active roster. On October 28, he was waived by the Patriots and was re-signed to the Patriots' practice squad. Barker won Super Bowl XLIX with the Patriots after they defeated the defending champion Seattle Seahawks 28–24.

On February 5, 2015, Barker was signed by the Patriots. On September 1, 2015, Barker was released by the Patriots. He was signed to the team's practice squad on September 7, but was released two days later. On September 19, 2015, Barker was re-signed to the practice squad. On September 30, 2015, he was released again. He was re-signed to the Patriots' practice squad again on October 9, 2015. On November 14, 2015, Barker was elevated to the active roster. On November 17, 2015, he was waived by the Patriots. On November 19, 2015, Barker was re-signed to the Patriots' practice squad. On January 26, 2016, Barker signed a futures contract with the New England Patriots.

On September 3, 2016, Barker was released by the Patriots as part of final roster cuts and was signed to the Patriots' practice squad the next day. Barker spent the entire 2016 season on the practice squad.

On February 5, 2017, Barker's Patriots appeared in Super Bowl LI. In the game, the Patriots defeated the Atlanta Falcons by a score of 34–28 in overtime.

On February 7, 2017, Barker signed a futures contract with the Patriots.

On May 18, 2017, Barker was released by the Patriots.

=== Cleveland Browns ===
On May 19, 2017, Barker was claimed off waivers by the Cleveland Browns. He was waived/injured by the Browns on July 30, 2017, after sustaining an Achilles injury during the Browns' 2017 training camp and placed on injured reserve.
