= 2011 Hawaii Bowl =

2011 Sheraton Hawaii Bowl
Nevada Wolf Pack	Southern Miss Golden Eagles
(7–5)	(11–2)
WAC	C-USA
17	24
Head coach: Chris Ault	Head coach: Larry Fedora
AP / Coaches / BCS; NR / NR / NR	AP / Coaches / BCS; 22 / 21 / 21
	1	2	3	4	Total
Nevada	0	14	3	0	17
Southern Miss	0	17	0	7	24
- Date: December 24, 2011
- Season: 2011
- Stadium: Aloha Stadium
- Location: Halawa, Hawaii
- MVP: DL Cordarro Law, Southern Miss; RB Lampford Mark, Nevada
- Favorite: Southern Mississippi by 6
- National anthem: Tioni Tam Sing
- Referee: Alan Eck (MW)
- Halftime show: Sean Naʻauao
- Attendance: 32,630
- Payout: US$750,000 per team

United States TV coverage
- Network: ESPN
- Announcers: Mark Jones (Play-by-Play); Ed Cunningham (Analyst); Jessica Mendoza (Sidelines)
- Nielsen ratings: 1.44

The 2011 Sheraton Hawaii Bowl, the tenth edition of the game, was a post-season American college football bowl game, held on Christmas Eve 2011, at Aloha Stadium in Halawa, Hawaii as part of the 2011–12 NCAA Bowl season. It was telecast at 2:00 p.m. HT on ESPN and was sponsored by Sheraton Hotels and Resorts.

The game featured the Nevada Wolf Pack from the Western Athletic Conference (WAC) versus the Southern Miss Golden Eagles from Conference USA (C-USA). Southern Miss defeated Nevada, 24–17.

== Teams ==
The Wolf Pack has played twice previously in the Sheraton Hawaii Bowl, defeating UCF in 2005 and losing to SMU in 2009. Southern Miss is making its 22nd appearance in a bowl game and its second trip to Hawaiʻi. It defeated the host Rainbow Warriors 28–26 on October 15, 1977.

=== Nevada ===
The Wolf Pack finished second in the WAC conference with a 7–5 record. The team was led by seven players who earned All-WAC honors, including WAC Freshman of the Year quarterback Cody Fajardo who operated with Nevada's effective pistol offense (523 yards per game) and All-American defensive tackle Brett Roy.

=== Southern Miss ===
USM entered the bowl game with an 11–2 record. The Golden Eagles upset the Houston Cougars in the 2011 Conference USA Football Championship Game 49–28 to win the conference championship. The 2011 Hawaii Bowl was Southern Mississippi's 10th straight bowl game. The game was also coach Larry Fedora's last game with the Golden Eagles, as he was hired to coach the North Carolina Tar Heels. The Golden Eagles were led by senior quarterback Austin Davis, who completed 10,727 yards during his career. Four running backs, Kendrick Hardy, Jeremy Hester, Jamal Woodyard, and Desmond Johnson, carried the loads, each had at least one 100-yard game.

== Game summary ==
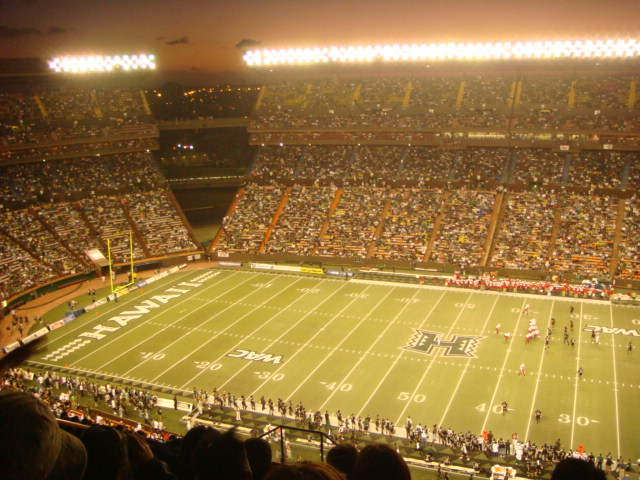
The 2011 Hawaii Bowl was played at Aloha Stadium.

In the 1st quarter, Nevada threatened to score first when the Wolf Pack drove into the red zone. However, Cody Fajardo's pass was intercepted in the end zone, ending the drive. The rest of the 1st quarter remained scoreless.

In the 2nd quarter, Southern Mississippi scored first when they blocked a punt in the end zone for a touchdown. Nevada responded with two rushing touchdowns from Lampford Mark, including one 45-yard rushing touchdown, to make the game 14–7. On the ensuing kickoff, Southern Miss's Jeremy Hester appeared to return the kickoff for a touchdown, but was stripped from behind by Nevada's Khalid Wooten and Thaddeus Brown. Nevada was unable to take advantage of the turnover, however, and turned the ball over on a 4th-and-1 play on the Wolf Pack's own 45-yard line. The Golden Eagles capitalized on their good field position to kick a field goal to cut the lead 14–10 with 1:21 left in the half. On the ensuing kickoff, Nevada's Khalid Wooten fumbled the kickoff and Southern Mississippi's Emmanuel Johnson recovered the ball at Nevada's 24. The Golden Eagles used the good field position to score a touchdown to take the lead 17-14 going into the half.

The second half was a defensive struggle for both teams. The Wolf Pack tied the game 17–17 in the 3rd quarter on a 37-yard field goal. The Golden Eagles took the lead 24–17 with 5:48 left in the game on a 4-yard touchdown pass from Austin Davis to Kelvin Bolden. On the ensuing drive, the Wolf Pack were stopped midfield on 4th-and-1 with 3:56 left in the game. The Golden Eagles were able to get a few more first downs to preserve the victory.

The 2011 Hawaii Bowl featured a record 17 punts and a record low 41 combined points. The win also gave the Southern Mississippi Golden Eagles its first 12-win season.

== Scoring summary ==
Source.

=== Statistics ===
Statistics	NEV	USM
First downs	15	29
Rushes-yards (net)	45–196	40–171
Passing yards (net)	117	165
Passes, Att-Comp-Int	28–13–1	42–18–0
Total offense, plays – yards	73–313	82–336
Time of possession	31:50	28:10

Scoring summary

Quarter	Time	Drive			Team	Scoring information	Score	
Quarter	Time	Plays	Yards	TOP	Team	Scoring information	NEV	USM
2	14:06				USM	Tray Becton-Martin 0 Yd Return Of Blocked Punt (Danny Hrapmann Kick)	0	7
2	7:45	13	81	6:16	NEV	Lampford Mark 5 Yd Run (Allen Hardison Kick)	7	7
2	4:54	4	68	1:29	NEV	Lampford Mark 45 Yd Run (Allen Hardison Kick)	14	7
2	1:21	5	13	1:33	USM	48-yard field goal by Danny Hrapmann	14	10
2	0:12	7	24	1:04	USM	Tracy Lampley 2 Yd Pass From Austin Davis (Danny Hrapmann Kick)	14	17
3	2:44	4	–6	1:57	NEV	37-yard field goal by Allen Hardison	17	17
4	5:48	7	68	1:36	USM	Kelvin Bolden 4 Yd Pass From Austin Davis (Danny Hrapmann Kick)	17	24
"TOP" = time of possession. For other American football terms, see Glossary of American football.							17	24
