= Isaiah Frey =

American football player (born 1990)

No. 31, 32
- Position: Safety

Personal information
- Born: April 6, 1990 (age 36); Roseville, California, U.S.
- Listed height: 5 ft 11 in (1.80 m)
- Listed weight: 188 lb (85 kg)

Career information
- High school: Jesuit (Carmichael, California)
- College: Nevada
- NFL draft: 2012: 6th round, 184th overall pick

Career history
- Chicago Bears (2012–2014); Tampa Bay Buccaneers (2014–2015); Pittsburgh Steelers (2015–2016)*; Dallas Cowboys (2016)*
- * Offseason or practice squad member only

Awards and highlights
- First-team All-WAC (2011)

Career NFL statistics
- Total tackles: 73
- Forced fumbles: 2
- Fumble recoveries: 1
- Pass deflections: 2
- Stats at Pro Football Reference

Isaiah Demetryst Frey (born April 6, 1990) is an American former professional football player who was a safety in the National Football League (NFL). He was selected by the Chicago Bears in the sixth round of the 2012 NFL draft. He played college football for the Nevada Wolfpack.

He also played for the Tampa Bay Buccaneers and spent time on the practice squads for the Pittsburgh Steelers and Dallas Cowboys.

== Early life ==
Frey was born on April 6, 1990, in Roseville, California. Frey's father, Demetryst Cornish, is a Walter Payton fan, and therefore named Frey's dogs "Bear" and "Payton." Frey and linebacker Lance Briggs were also from the same area.

"The only person I have an idea about is Lance Briggs just because we’re from the same area. He was a stud back in Sacramento and everybody knows about him. I’ve never met him; I’ve just heard stories about him."

— Frey about Lance Briggs

== College career ==
Frey played at University of Nevada, Reno, as a cornerback for the Nevada Wolf Pack. During his time with Nevada, he recorded 141 tackles, seven interceptions, seven tackles-for-loss, one sack and two forced fumbles in 51 games. During his year as a senior, Frey was named first-team all-WAC after tying for first in the FBS with 21 pass breakups and recording a career-high five interceptions.

== Professional career ==
=== Chicago Bears ===
Though Frey was projected to be an undrafted free agent, he was drafted in the 6th round, 184th overall by the Chicago Bears in the 2012 NFL draft.

"Frey gives the Bears an athletic corner with athleticism and quickness. He is ideally suited to play in a two-deep scheme and will have a chance to make the roster as a sub defender."

— NFL.com analyst Bucky Brooks

On May 9, 2012, the Bears signed Frey to his four-year rookie contract. In the third game of the preseason against the New York Giants, Frey intercepted a David Carr pass in the end zone with 1:06 in the game to give the Bears a 20–17 victory. However, he was waived by Chicago as a part of final roster cuts on August 31. Frey was subsequently re-signed to the Bears' practice squad.

The Bears waived Frey on August 26, 2014. On September 1, he was re-signed to the practice squad. He was again released by the Bears on October 7, and replaced on the team's roster by practice squad member Al Louis-Jean.

=== Tampa Bay Buccaneers ===
Frey signed with the Tampa Bay Buccaneers on October 14, 2014. He was released by the Buccaneers on September 5, 2015.

=== Pittsburgh Steelers ===
On October 27, 2015, Frey was signed to the Pittsburgh Steelers' practice squad.

=== Dallas Cowboys ===
On June 13, 2016, Frey was signed by the Dallas Cowboys. On September 3, he was released by the Cowboys.

== NFL career statistics ==
Year	Team	Games		Tackles					Interceptions						Fumbles	
Year	Team	GP	GS	Cmb	Solo	Ast	Sck	Sfty	PD	Int	Yds	Avg	Lng	TD	FF	FR
2013	CHI	16	6	47	37	10	0.0	0	1	0	0	–	–	0	0	0
2014	CHI	3	1	11	5	6	0.0	0	0	0	0	–	–	0	2	1
2014	TB	8	0	15	9	6	0.0	0	1	0	0	–	–	0	0	0
Career		27	7	73	51	22	0.0	0	2	0	0	–	–	0	2	1
Source: Pro-Football-Reference.com
