= Jeff Nady =

American football player and coach (born 1990)

Vanderbilt Commodores
- Title: Assistant offensive line coach

Personal information
- Born: February 15, 1990 (age 36); Reno, Nevada, U.S.
- Listed height: 6 ft 7 in (2.01 m)
- Listed weight: 315 lb (143 kg)

Career information
- High school: Minden (NV)
- College: Nevada (2008–2012)
- NFL draft: 2013: undrafted

Career history

Playing
- Atlanta Falcons (2013)*; Jacksonville Jaguars (2013)*; Spokane Shock (2014)*; San Jose SaberCats (2014); Las Vegas Outlaws (2015)
- * Offseason or practice squad member only

Coaching
- Nevada (2013–2014) Student assistant; Nevada (2016–2017) Graduate assistant; Fort Lewis (2018–2021) Offensive coordinator/offensive line coach/recruiting coordinator; Nevada (2022) Offensive line coach; South Dakota (2023–2024) Offensive line coach; Vanderbilt (2025–present) Assistant offensive line coach

Awards and highlights
- First-team All-MWC (2012); Second-team All-WAC (2011)

Career AFL statistics
- Receptions: 1
- Receiving yards: 3
- Receiving touchdowns: 1
- Rushing yards: 6
- Stats at ArenaFan.com

Jeffrey Wray Nicholas Nady (born February 15, 1990) is an American football tackle who is currently the assistant offensive line coach for the Vanderbilt Commodores. He was signed by the Jacksonville Jaguars as an undrafted free agent in 2013. He played college football at Nevada.

Nady was also a member of the Atlanta Falcons of the NFL, and the Spokane Shock, San Jose SaberCats, and Las Vegas Outlaws of the Arena Football League (AFL).

== Early life ==
Nady was a two-year letterwinner in football at Douglas High School. He helped his team to Sierra League championship in 2007 and was first-team all-league and all-region as a defensive lineman, and was first-team all-league, all-region and all-state as a punter. He was a three-year letterman in basketball and was a three-time all-region selection on the hardwood.

== College career ==
Nady attended the University of Nevada, Reno where he earned ALL-WAC accolades in his junior and senior seasons with the Wolf Pack. He was named to Outland Trophy and Lombardi Award watch lists in July 2012 prior to the start of his senior season.

== Professional career ==
=== Jacksonville Jaguars ===
Nady signed with Jacksonville on April 27, 2013. He was released on May 16, 2013.

=== Atlanta Falcons ===
Following his release from Jacksonville, Nady signed with Atlanta on August 9, 2013. He played in his first professional game against the Baltimore Ravens on August 15, 2013. He was released on August 26, 2013.

=== Spokane Shock ===
After his release from Atlanta, Nady caught on with the Spokane Shock of the Arena Football League where he was later released.

=== San Jose SaberCats ===
Nady was assigned to San Jose in March 2014 where he is playing fullback and offensive line for the SaberCats. Nady scored his first professional touchdown, a three-yard catch, June 29, 2014 against the Arizona Rattlers.

=== Las Vegas Outlaws ===
On December 22, 2014, Nady was drafted by the Las Vegas Outlaws in the 2014 Expansion Draft.

== Coaching career ==
=== Nevada (first stint) ===
In August 2016, Nady joined the football coaching staff as an assistant coach at the University of Nevada, Reno.

=== Fort Lewis ===
On January 22, 2019, Nady was named as the offensive coordinator for the Fort Lewis Skyhawks.

=== Nevada (second stint) ===
On February 25, 2022, Nady rejoined the coaching staff at Nevada as the offensive line coach.

=== South Dakota ===
On February 24, 2023, Nady was hired by the South Dakota Coyotes as their offensive line coach.

=== Vanderbilt ===
On February 21, 2025, Nady was hired by Vanderbilt as their assistant offensive line coach.

== Personal life ==
Nady is the son of Joe and Cleo Nady, has an older brother, Joe, and older sister, Tobie Whipple. His father and uncle Andy Hargrove played baseball at Nevada, his uncle Jay Nady played football at Nevada and his cousin is Major League Baseball player Xavier Nady.
