= Chase Tenpenny =

American footballer (born 1991)

No. 37
- Position: Punter

Personal information
- Born: August 6, 1991 (age 35); Oskaloosa, Kansas, U.S.
- Listed height: 6 ft 3 in (1.91 m)
- Listed weight: 252 lb (114 kg)

Career information
- College: Nevada
- NFL draft: 2014: undrafted

Career history
- San Diego Chargers (2014)*; Tampa Bay Buccaneers (2015)
- * Offseason or practice squad member only
- Stats at Pro Football Reference

Chase Tenpenny (born August 6, 1991) is an American football punter.

== Professional career ==
=== San Diego Chargers ===
Tenpenny signed with the San Diego Chargers on May 10, 2014. He was released by the Chargers on August 25, 2014.

=== Tampa Bay Buccaneers ===
Tenpenny was signed by the Tampa Bay Buccaneers to a future contract on January 5, 2015. Tenpenny was waived on April 16, 2015.
