= 2011 Mountain West Conference football season =

- League: Division I FBS (Football Bowl Subdivision)
- Sport: Football
- Duration: September 1, 2011–January 2012
- Teams: 8
- TV partner(s): The Mtn., CBS Sports Network, Versus

2012 NFL Draft
- Top draft pick: LB Shea McClellin, Boise State
- Picked by: Chicago Bears, 19th overall

Regular season

Football seasons
- 2010 2012

2011 Mountain West Conference football standings
	Conf.			Overall
Team	W		L	W		L
No. 14 TCU $	7	–	0	11	–	2
No. 8 Boise State	6	–	1	12	–	1
Wyoming	5	–	2	8	–	5
San Diego State	4	–	3	8	–	5
Air Force	3	–	4	7	–	6
Colorado State	1	–	6	3	–	9
UNLV	1	–	6	2	–	10
New Mexico	1	–	6	1	–	11
$ – Conference champion; Rankings from AP Poll

The 2011 Mountain West Conference football season was the 13th season of college football for the Mountain West Conference (MW). Eight teams participated in that season: Air Force, Colorado State, New Mexico, San Diego State, TCU, UNLV, Wyoming and new member Boise State.

This was the first year the MW was without founding members Utah and BYU, which respectively left for the Pac-12 Conference and FBS independent status, with BYU's other sports joining the West Coast Conference. In response to their departure, the conference added Boise State for this season, and would eventually add Fresno State, Hawaiʻi (football only; other sports joined the Big West Conference), and Nevada for the 2012 season.

This was also the last year for TCU as an MW member. The Horned Frogs were originally set to become a member of the Big East Conference in the 2012 season. However, on October 10, they accepted a bid to join the Big 12 Conference.

== Preseason ==
=== Award watch lists ===
The following Mountain West players were named to preseason award watch lists.

Maxwell Award:

- Doug Martin – Boise State
- Kellen Moore – Boise State
- Ronnie Hillman – San Diego State
- Ryan Lindley – San Diego State

Chuck Bednarik Award:

- Billy Winn – Boise State
- Tanner Brock – TCU
- Tank Carder – TCU

John Mackey Award:

- Kyle Efaw – Boise State
- Lucas Reed – New Mexico

Fred Biletnikoff Award:

- Tyler Shoemaker – Boise State
- Josh Boyce – TCU

Bronko Nagurski Trophy:

- Billy Winn – Boise State
- Mychal Sisson – Colorado State
- Miles Burris – San Diego State
- Tanner Brock – TCU
- Tank Carder – TCU

Outland Trophy:

- Nate Potter – Boise State
- Billy Winn – Boise State

Jim Thorpe Award:

- George Iloka – Boise State

Lombardi Award:

- Thomas Byrd – Boise State
- Shea McClellin – Boise State
- Nate Potter – Boise State
- Billy Winn – Boise State
- Mychall Sisson – Colorado State
- Carmen Messina – New Mexico
- Miles Burris – San Diego State
- Tanner Brock – TCU
- Tank Carder – TCU

Rimington Trophy:

- Thomas Byrd – Boise State
- Weston Richburg – Colorado State
- Dillon Farrell – New Mexico
- Nick Carlson – Wyoming

Davey O'Brien Award:

- Kellen Moore – Boise State
- Ryan Lindley – San Diego State

Doak Walker Award:

- Asher Clark – Air Force
- Doug Martin – Boise State
- Ronnie Hillman – San Diego State
- Matthew Tucker – TCU
- Ed Wesley – TCU
- Alvester Alexander – Wyoming

Walter Camp Award:

- Kellen Moore – Kellen Moore
- Ronnie Hillman – San Diego State
- Tank Carder – TCU

Lott Trophy:

- Billy Winn – Boise State
- Tank Carder – TCU

Lou Groza Award:

- Able Perez – San Diego State
- Ross Evans – TCU

=== Mountain West media days ===
==== Media poll ====
During the Mountain West media days on July 26–27 in Las Vegas, Boise State was picked as the overwhelming favorite to win the conference, garnering 28 of a possible 31 first place votes. Defending champion TCU received the other 3 first place votes and were picked second.

1. Boise State – 236 (28)
2. TCU – 208 (3)
3. Air Force – 176
4. San Diego State – 160
5. Colorado State – 104
6. Wyoming – 80
7. UNLV – 77
8. New Mexico – 39

==== All–Conference Team ====
The media also selected their preseason all–conference team. Boise State's Sr. QB Kellen Moore was selected as the offensive player of the year. TCU's Sr. LB Tank Carder was selected as the defensive player of the year. Air Force's Sr. KR Jonathan Warzeka was selected as the special teams player of the year.

Offense
QB Kellen Moore–Boise State
RB Doug Martin–Boise State
RB Ronnie Hillman–San Diego State
WR Phillip Payne–UNLV
WR Josh Boyce–TCU
TE Lucas Reed–New Mexico
OL Thomas Byrd–Boise State
OL Nate Potter–Boise State
OL A.J. Wallerstein–Air Force
OL Kyle Dooley–TCU
OL Paul Madsen–Colorado State

Defense
DL Billy Winn–Boise State
DL Shea McClellin–Boise State
DL Stansly Maponga–TCU
DL Josh Biezuns–Wyoming
LB Tank Carder–TCU
LB Mychal Sisson–Colorado State
LB Miles Burris–San Diego State
DB George Iloka–Boise State
DB Leon McFadden–San Diego State
DB Anthony Wright–Air Force
DB Jon Davis–Air Force

Specialists
PK James Aho–New Mexico
P Brian Stahovich–San Diego State
KR Jonathan Warzeka–Air Force

==== Boise State all blue uniform ban ====
New conference member Boise State was banned by the Mountain West Conference from wearing their traditional all blue uniforms during conference home games. Mountain West commissioner Craig Thompson's reason for the rule was that coaches had stated that the Broncos received a "competitive advantage" when wearing all blue on the blue turf of Bronco Stadium. Boise State head coach Chris Petersen was quoted that he thought the ban was, "ridiculous".

== Coaches ==
NOTE: Stats shown are before the beginning of the season

Team	Head coach	Years at school	Overall record	Record at school	MW record
Air Force	Troy Calhoun	5	34–18	34–18	21–11
Boise State	Chris Petersen	6	61–5	61–5	0–0*
Colorado State	Steve Fairchild	4	13–24	13–24	6–18
New Mexico	Mike Locksley (fired on 9/25/11); George Barlow (interim)	3; 1	2–22; 0–0	2–22; 0–0	2–14; 0–0
San Diego State	Rocky Long	1	65–69	0–0	40–34^
TCU	Gary Patterson	11	98–28	98–28	41–7
UNLV	Bobby Hauck	2	82–28	2–11	2–6
Wyoming	Dave Christensen	3	10–15	10–15	5–11

*first year as conference member, ^achieved as head coach of New Mexico from 99–08

== Rankings ==
The following Mountain West teams have been either ranked or received votes in the major polls during the 2011 season:

Ranking movement Legend: ██ Increase in ranking. ██ Decrease in ranking. ██ Not ranked the previous week.
		Pre	Wk 1	Wk 2	Wk 3	Wk 4	Wk 5	Wk 6	Wk 7	Wk 8	Wk 9	Wk 10	Wk 11	Wk 12	Wk 13	Wk 14	Final
Air Force	AP	RV	RV														
Air Force	C	RV	RV			RV	RV										
Air Force	Harris	Not released															
Air Force	BCS	Not released															
Boise State	AP	5	4	4	4	4	5	5	5	5	5	5	10				
Boise State	C	7	5	4	4	5	6	6	7	5	5	5	11				
Boise State	Harris	Not released						5	5	5	5	5	11				
Boise State	BCS	Not released							5	4	5	5	10				
San Diego State	AP				RV												
San Diego State	C			RV	RV												
San Diego State	Harris	Not released															
San Diego State	BCS	Not released															
TCU	AP	14	25	23	20	20				RV	RV	RV	19				
TCU	C	15	25	23	20	20		RV	RV	RV	RV	24	19				
TCU	Harris	Not released						RV	RV	RV	RV	25	21				
TCU	BCS	Not released											19				

== Mountain West vs. BCS matchups ==
Date	Visitor	Home	Notes
September 1	UNLV 17	#10 Wisconsin 51	
September 2	#15 TCU 48	Baylor 50	TCU loss snapped a 25-game regular season winning streak
September 3^	#7 Boise State 35	#22 Georgia 21	Chick-fil-A Kickoff Game at the Georgia Dome in Atlanta; Boise State's first ever win against an SEC team
September 10	New Mexico 3	#13 Arkansas 52	Played at Arkansas' secondary home in Little Rock
September 10	UNLV 7	Washington State 59	
September 17^	Colorado State 14	Colorado 28	Rocky Mountain Showdown at Sports Authority Field at Mile High in Denver
September 17	Texas Tech 59	New Mexico 13	Second straight year the Lobos have hosted Texas Tech
September 17	Washington State 24	San Diego State 42	
September 24	San Diego State 7	#21 Michigan 28	Michigan head coach Brady Hoke coached San Diego State the last two seasons
September 24	#9 Nebraska 38	Wyoming 14	
October 8	Air Force 33	Notre Dame 59	
^Denotes neutral site game

== Regular season ==
Index to colors and formatting
Mountain West member won
Mountain West member lost
Mountain West teams in **bold**

All dates, times, and TV are tentative and subject to change.

The Mountain West has teams in 3 different time zones. Times reflect start time in respective time zone of each team (Central–TCU, Mountain–Air Force, Boise State, Colorado State, New Mexico, Wyoming, Pacific–San Diego State, UNLV). Conference games start times are that of the home team.

Rankings reflect that of the USA Today Coaches poll for that week until week eight when the BCS poll will be used.

=== Week one ===
Date	Time	Visiting team	Home team	Site	TV	Result	Attendance
September 1	5:00 p.m.	**UNLV**	#10 Wisconsin	Camp Randall Stadium • Madison, Wisconsin	ESPN	**L** 17–51	77,085
September 2	7:00 p.m.	#15 **TCU**	Baylor	Floyd Casey Stadium • Waco, Texas	ESPN	**L** 48–50	43,753
September 3	12:00 p.m.	South Dakota	**Air Force**	Falcon Stadium • Colorado Springs, Colorado	The Mtn.	**W** 37–20	39,105
September 3	4:00 p.m.	**Colorado State**	**New Mexico**	University Stadium • Albuquerque, New Mexico	The Mtn.	**CSU** 14–10	21,454
September 3 ^	6:00 p.m.	#7 **Boise State**	#22 Georgia	Georgia Dome • Atlanta (Chick-fil-A Kickoff Game)	ESPN	**W** 35–21	73,614
September 3	7:00 p.m.	Cal Poly	**San Diego State**	Qualcomm Stadium • San Diego	The Mtn.	**W** 49–21	34,384
September 3	7:00 p.m.	Weber State	**Wyoming**	War Memorial Stadium • Laramie, Wyoming		**W** 35–32	21,492

^ Neutral site

Players of the week:

Offensive		Defensive		Special teams	
Player	Team	Player	Team	Player	Team
Kellen Moore	Boise State	Nordly Capi	Colorado State	Greg McCoy	TCU

=== Week two ===
Date	Time	Visiting team	Home team	Site	TV	Result	Attendance
September 10	9:00 a.m.	**San Diego State**	Army	Michie Stadium • West Point, New York	CBS Sports Network	**W** 23–20	26,778
September 10	12:00 p.m.	Northern Colorado	**Colorado State**	Hughes Stadium • Fort Collins, Colorado	The Mtn.	**W** 33–14	25,367
September 10	1:30 p.m.	#25 **TCU**	**Air Force**	Flacon Stadium • Colorado Springs, Colorado	Versus	**TCU** 35–19	42,107
September 10	2:00 p.m.	**UNLV**	Washington State	Martin Stadium • Pullman, Washington		**L** 7–59	27,018
September 10	4:00 p.m.	Texas State	**Wyoming**	War Memorial Stadium • Laramie, Wyoming	The Mtn.	**W** 45–10	23,248
September 10	5:00 p.m.	**New Mexico**	#13 Arkansas	War Memorial Stadium • Little Rock, Arkansas	ESPNU	**L** 3–52	52,606

Players of the week:

Offensive		Defensive		Special teams	
Player	Team	Player	Team	Player	Team
Casey Pachall	TCU	Jerome Long	San Diego State	Brian Stahovich	San Diego State

=== Week three ===
Date	Time	Visiting team	Home team	Site	TV	Result	Attendance
September 16	6:00 p.m.	#4 **Boise State**	Toledo	Glass Bowl • Toledo, Ohio	ESPN	**W** 40–15	28,905
September 17	10:00 a.m.	**Wyoming**	Bowling Green	Doyt Perry Stadium • Bowling Green, Ohio		**W** 28–27	14,813
September 17 ^	11:30 a.m.	**Colorado State**	Colorado	Sports Authority Field at Mile High • Fort Collins, Colorado (Rocky Mountain Showdown)	FSN	**L** 14–28	57,186
September 17	1:00 p.m.	Louisiana-Monroe	#23 **TCU**	Amon G. Carter Stadium • Fort Worth, Texas	The Mtn.	**W** 38–17	32,719
September 17	1:30 p.m.	Texas Tech	**New Mexico**	University Stadium • Albuquerque, New Mexico	Versus	**L** 13–59	20,674
September 17	3:00 p.m.	Washington State	**San Diego State**	Qualcomm Stadium • San Diego	The Mtn.	**W** 42–24	57,286
September 17	7:00 p.m.	Hawaiʻi	**UNLV**	Sam Boyd Stadium • Whitney, Nevada	The Mtn.	**W** 40–20	21,248

^ Neutral site Players of the week:

Offensive		Defensive		Special teams	
Co-Players	Teams	Co-Players	Teams	Player	Team
Kellen Moore (2)/Ronnie Hillman	Boise State/San Diego State	Larry Parker/Josh Biezuns	San Diego State/Wyoming	Greg McCoy (2)	TCU

Kellen Moore was also named the Davy O'Brien Quarterback of the Week. Greg McCoy was also named the National Kickoff Returner of the Week by College Football Performance Awards.

=== Week four ===
Date	Time	Visiting team	Home team	Site	TV	Result	Attendance
September 24	9:00 a.m.	**San Diego State**	#21 Michigan	Michigan Stadium • Ann Arbor, Michigan	BTN	**L** 7–28	110,707
September 24	1:00 p.m.	Tennessee State	**Air Force**	Falcon Stadium • Colorado Springs, Colorado	The Mtn.	**W** 63–24	33,487
September 24	4:00 p.m.	#20 (FCS) Sam Houston State	**New Mexico**	University Stadium • Albuquerque, New Mexico		**L** 45–48 ^{OT}	16,313
September 24	5:30 p.m.	#9 Nebraska	**Wyoming**	War Memorial Stadium • Laramie, Wyoming	Versus	**L** 14–38	32,617
September 24	6:00 p.m.	Tulsa	#4 **Boise State**	Bronco Stadium • Boise, Idaho	CBS Sports Network	**W** 41–21	34,019
September 24	6:00 p.m.	**Colorado State**	Utah State	Romney Stadium • Logan, Utah	ESPN3	**W** 35–34 ^{2OT}	22,599
September 24	6:00 p.m.	Portland State	#20 **TCU**	Amon G. Cater Stadium • Fort Worth, Texas		**W** 55–13	33,825
September 24	6:00 p.m.	#23 (FCS) Southern Utah	**UNLV**	Sam Boyd Stadium • Whitney, Nevada	The Mtn.	**L** 16–41	18,102

Players of the week:

Offensive		Defensive		Special teams	
Co-Players	Teams	Player	Team	Player	Team
Chris Nwoke/Deon Long	Colorado State/New Mexico	Shaquil Barrett	Colorado State	Tanner Hedstrom	Colorado State

Coaching change

On September 25, 2011 following a 0–4 start which included a loss to Sam Houston State of the FCS, New Mexico relieved Mike Locksley of his duties as head coach. Associate head coach and defensive coordinator George Barlow assumed the job on an interim basis for the remainder of the season.

=== Week five ===
Date	Time	Visiting team	Home team	Site	TV	Result	Attendance
October 1	10:00 a.m.	**Air Force**	Navy	Navy–Marine Corps Memorial Stadium • Annapolis, Maryland	CBS	**W** 35–34 ^{OT}	37,506
October 1	12:30 p.m.	Nevada	#5 **Boise State**	Bronco Stadium • Boise, Idaho (Rivalry)	Versus	**W** 30–10	34,098
October 1	2:00 p.m.	San Jose State	**Colorado State**	Hughes Stadium • Fort Collins, Colorado	The Mtn.	**L** 31–38	27,683
October 1	2:30 p.m.	SMU	#20 **TCU**	Amon G. Cater Stadium • Fort Worth, Texas (Battle for the Iron Skillet)	CBS Sports Network	**L** 33–40 ^{OT}	35,632
October 1	6:00 p.m.	New Mexico State	**New Mexico**	University Stadium • Albuquerque, New Mexico (Rio Grande Rivalry)	The Mtn.	**L** 28–42	30,091

Players of the week:

Offensive		Defensive		Special teams	
Player	Team	Player	Team	Player	Team
Tim Jefferson	Air Force	Brady Amack	Air Force	Alex Means	Air Force

=== Week six ===
Date	Time	Visiting team	Home team	Site	TV	Result	Attendance
October 7	7:00 p.m.	#6 **Boise State**	Fresno State	Bulldog Stadium • Fresno, California (Battle for the Milk Can)	ESPN	**W** 57–7	33,871
October 8	1:30 p.m.	**Air Force**	Notre Dame	Notre Dame Stadium • South Bend, Indiana	NBC	**L** 33–59	80,795
October 8	4:00 p.m.	**UNLV**	Nevada	Mackay Stadium • Reno, Nevada (37th Battle for Nevada)	ESPN3	**L** 0–37	25,978
October 8	6:00 p.m.	**Wyoming**	Utah State	Romney Stadium • Logan, Utah	ESPN3	**L** 19–63	17,561
October 8	7:30 p.m.	**TCU**	**San Diego State**	Qualcomm Stadium • San Diego, California	CBS Sports Network	**TCU** 27–14	44,248

Players of the week:

Offensive		Defensive		Special teams	
Player	Team	Player	Team	Player	Team
Kellen Moore (3)	Boise State	Tekkerein Cuba	TCU	Ross Evans	TCU

=== Week seven ===
Date	Time	Visiting team	Home team	Site	TV	Result	Attendance
October 13	6:00 p.m.	**San Diego State**	**Air Force**	Falcon Stadium • Colorado Springs, Colorado	CBS Sports Network	**SDSU** 41–27	27,490
October 15	12:00 p.m.	**New Mexico**	Nevada	Mackay Stadium • Reno, Nevada		**L** 7–49	15,369
October 15	12:00 p.m.	**UNLV**	**Wyoming**	War Memorial Stadium • Laramie, Wyoming	The Mtn.	**WYO** 41–14	22,985
October 15	4:00 p.m.	#6 **Boise State**	**Colorado State**	Hughes Stadium • Fort Collins, Colorado	The Mtn.	**BSU** 63–13	30,027

Players of the week:

Co–Offensive		Defensive		Special teams	
Players	Teams	Player	Team	Player	Team
Doug Martin/Ronnie Hillman (2)	Boise State/San Diego State	Tyrone Crawford	Boise State	Chris McNeill	Wyoming

=== Week eight ===
Date	Time	Visiting team	Home team	Site	TV	Result	Attendance
October 22	1:00 p.m.	**New Mexico**	**TCU**	Amon G. Carter Stadium • Fort Worth, Texas	The Mtn.	**TCU** 69–0	33,833
October 22	1:30 p.m.	**Air Force**	#5 **Boise State**	Bronco Stadium • Boise, Idaho	Versus	**BSU** 37–26	34,196
October 22	6:00 p.m.	**Colorado State**	UTEP	Sun Bowl Stadium • El Paso, Texas	TWC El Paso	**L** 17–31	31,797

Players of the week:

Offensive		Defensive		Special teams	
Player	Team	Player	Team	Player	Team
Kellen Moore (4)	Boise State	Byron Hout	Boise State	Antonio Graves	TCU

=== Week nine ===
Date	Time	Visiting team	Home team	Site	TV	Result	Attendance
October 28 ^	7:00 p.m.	**TCU**	BYU	Cowboys Stadium • Arlington, Texas	ESPN	**W** 38–28	50,094
October 29	12:00 p.m.	**Air Force**	**New Mexico**	University Stadium • Albuquerque, New Mexico	The Mtn.	**AFA** 42–0	16,691
October 29	3:00 p.m.	**Colorado State**	**UNLV**	Sam Boyd Stadium • Whitney, Nevada	The Mtn.	**UNLV** 38–35	21,289
October 29	7:00 p.m.	**Wyoming**	**San Diego State**	Qualcomm Stadium • San Diego, California	The Mtn.	**WYO** 30–27	29,730

^ Neutral site

Players of the week:

Co-Offensive		Co-Defensive		Special teams	
Players	Teams	Players	Teams	Player	Team
Brett Smith/Ronnie Hillman (3)	Wyoming/San Diego State	James Dunlap/Jonathan Anderson	Colorado State/TCU	Deante' Purvis	UNLV

=== Week ten ===
Date	Time	Visiting team	Home team	Site	TV	Result	Attendance
November 5	12:00 p.m.	**TCU**	**Wyoming**	War Memorial Stadium • Laramie, Wyoming	The Mtn.	**TCU** 30–21	17,673
November 5	1:30 p.m.	Army	**Air Force**	Falcon Stadium • Colorado Springs, Colorado	CBS	**W** 24–14	46,709
November 5	5:00 p.m.	**New Mexico**	**San Diego State**	Qualcomm Stadium • San Diego	The Mtn.	**SDSU** 35–7	28,362
November 5	7:30 p.m.	#5 **Boise State**	**UNLV**	Sam Boyd Stadium • Whitney, Nevada	CBS Sports Network	**BSU** 48–21	26,281

Players of the week:

Offensive		Defensive		Special teams	
Player	Team	Player	Team	Player	Team
Waymon James	TCU	Jon Davis	Air Force	Parker Herrington	Air Force

=== Week eleven ===
Date	Time	Visiting team	Home team	Site	TV	Result	Attendance
November 12	12:00 p.m.	**Wyoming**	**Air Force**	Falcon Stadium • Colorado Springs, Colorado	The Mtn.	**WYO** 25–17	33,823
November 12	1:30 p.m.	**TCU**	#5 **Boise State**	Bronco Stadium • Boise, Idaho	Versus	**TCU** 36–35	34,146
November 12	4:00 p.m.	**San Diego State**	**Colorado State**	Hughes Stadium • Fort Collins, Colorado	The Mtn.	**SDSU** 18–15	16,811
November 12	8:00 p.m.	**UNLV**	**New Mexico**	University Stadium • Albuquerque, New Mexico	CBS Sports Network	**UNM** 21–14	14,937

Players of the week:

Offensive		Co–Defensive		Special teams	
Player	Team	Players	Teams	Player	Team
Casey Pachall (2)	TCU	Carmen Messina/Nat Berhe	New Mexico/San Diego State	Anson Kelton	TCU

=== Week twelve ===
Date	Time	Visiting team	Home team	Site	TV	Result	Attendance
November 19	12:00 p.m.	**New Mexico**	**Wyoming**	War Memorial Stadium • Laramie, Wyoming	The Mtn.		
November 19	2:30 p.m.	**Colorado State**	#19 **TCU**	Amon G. Carter Stadium • Fort Worth, Texas	CBS Sports Network		
November 19	4:00 p.m.	**UNLV**	**Air Force**	Falcon Stadium • Colorado Springs, Colorado	The Mtn.		
November 19	5:00 p.m.	#10 **Boise State**	**San Diego State**	Qualcomm Stadium • San Diego, California	CBS Sports Network		

=== Week thirteen ===
Date	Time	Visiting team	Home team	Site	TV	Result	Attendance
November 26	12:00 p.m.	**Wyoming**	**Boise State**	Bronco Stadium • Boise, Idaho	The Mtn.		
November 26	4:00 p.m.	**Air Force**	**Colorado State**	Hughes Stadium • Fort Collins, Colorado (Ram–Falcon Trophy)	The Mtn.		
November 26	7:00 p.m.	**San Diego State**	**UNLV**	Sam Boyd Stadium • Whitney, Nevada	The Mtn.		

=== Week fourteen ===
Date	Time	Visiting team	Home team	Site	TV	Result	Attendance
December 3	12:00 p.m.	**Wyoming**	**Colorado State**	Hughes Stadium • Fort Collins, Colorado (Border War)	The Mtn.		
December 3	1:30 p.m.	**UNLV**	**TCU**	Amon G. Carter Stadium • Fort Worth, Texas	Versus		
December 3	4:00 p.m.	**New Mexico**	**Boise State**	Bronco Stadium • Boise, Idaho	The Mtn.		
December 3	5:00 p.m.	Fresno State	**San Diego State**	Qualcomm Stadium • San Diego	CBS Sports Network		

== Home attendance ==
Team	Stadium	Capacity	Game 1	Game 2	Game 3	Game 4	Game 5	Game 6	Game 7	Total	Average	% of Capacity
Air Force	Falcon Stadium	52,480	39,105	42,107	33,487	27,490	46,709	33,823		222,721	37,121	70.7%
Boise State	Bronco Stadium	33,500	34,019	34,098	34,196	34,146			—	136,519	34,130	101.9%
Colorado State	Hughes Stadium	34,400	25,367	27,683	30,027	16,811			—	99,888	24,972	72.6.5%
New Mexico	University Stadium	38,634	21,454	20,674	16,313	30,091	16,691	14,937	—	120,160	20,027	51.8%
San Diego State	Qualcomm Stadium	71,294	34,384	57,286	44,248	29,730	28,362	52,256		246,266	41,044	57.6%
TCU	Amon G. Carter Stadium	34,000	32,719	33,825	35,632	33,833			—	136,009	34,003	100.0%
UNLV	Sam Boyd Stadium	36,800	21,248	18,102	21,289	26,281		—	—	86,920	21,730	59.0%
Wyoming	War Memorial Stadium	34,000	21,492	23,248	32,617	22,985	17,673		—	118,015	23,603	69.4%

== Awards and honors ==
=== All Conference teams ===
- Offensive Player of the Year: Kellen Moore, SR., QB, Boise State
- Defensive Player of the Year: Tank Carder, SR., LB, TCU
- Special Teams Player of the Year: Greg McCoy, SR., KR, TCU
- Freshman of the Year: Brett Smith, QB, Wyoming
- Coach of the Year: Dave Christensen, Wyoming

Offense:

Pos.	Name	Yr.	School	Name	Yr.	School
First Team				Second Team		
QB	Kellen Moore	SR.	Boise State	Casey Pachall	SO.	TCU
WR	Tyler Shoemaker	SR.	Boise State	Deon Long	FR.	New Mexico
WR	Josh Boyce	SO.	TCU	Chris McNeil	JR.	Wyoming
RB	Doug Martin	SR.	Boise State	Asher Clark	SR.	Air Force
RB	Ronnie Hillman	SO.	San Diego State	Chris Nwoke	SO.	Colorado State
TE	Gavin Escobar	SO.	San Diego State	Crockett Gillmore	SO.	Colorado State
OL	A. J. Wallerstein	SR.	Air Force	Paul Madsen	SR.	Colorado State
OL	Nate Potter	SR.	Boise State	Weston Richburg	SO.	Colorado State
OL	Tommie Draheim	SR.	San Diego State	Alec Johnson	JR.	San Diego State
OL	Kyle Dooley	SR.	TCU	Nick Carlson	JR.	Wyoming
OL	Blaize Foltz	JR.	TCU	Clayton Kirven	SR.	Wyoming
PK	Parker Herrington	JR.	Air Force	Ross Evans	SR.	TCU
PR/KR	Greg McCoy	SR.	TCU	Deante' Purvis	SR.	UNLV

Defense:

Pos.	Name	Yr.	School	Name	Yr.	School
First Team				Second Team		
DL	Tyrone Crawford	SR.	Boise State	Billy Winn	SR.	Boise State
DL	Shea McClellin	SR.	Boise State	Jerome Long	SR.	San Diego State
DL	Cap Capi	SO.	Colorado State	Josh Biezuns	SR.	Wyoming
DL	Stansly Maponga	SO.	TCU	Gabriel Knapton	SR.	Wyoming
LB	Carmen Messina	SR.	New Mexico	Brady Amack	SR.	Air Force
LB	Miles Burris	SR.	San Diego State	Kenny Cain	JR.	TCU
LB	Tank Carder	SR.	TCU	Brian Hendricks	SR.	Wyoming
DB	Jon Davis	SR.	Air Force	Anthony Wright	SR.	Air Force
DB	George Iloka	SR.	Boise State	Tekerrein Cuba	SR.	TCU
DB	Leon McFadden	JR.	San Diego State	Tashaun Gipson	SR.	Wyoming
DB	Larry Parker	SR.	San Diego State	Luke Ruff	JR.	Wyoming
P	Brian Stahovich	SR.	San Diego State	Pete Kontodiakos	JR.	Colorado State
