= 2011 All-America college football team =

Official list of the best college football players of 2011

The All-America college football team is an honor given annually to the best players of American college football at their respective positions. The original All-America team was the 1889 All-America college football team selected by Caspar Whitney. In 1950, the National Collegiate Athletic Bureau, which is the National Collegiate Athletic Association's (NCAA) service bureau, compiled the first list of All-Americans including first-team selections on teams created for a national audience that received national circulation with the intent of recognizing selections made from viewpoints that were nationwide. Since 1952, College Sports Information Directors of America (CoSIDA) has bestowed Academic All-American recognition on male and female athletes in Divisions I, II, and III of the NCAA as well as National Association of Intercollegiate Athletics athletes, covering all NCAA championship sports.

The 2011 All-America college football team is composed of the following All-America first teams: Associated Press (AP), Football Writers Association of America (FWAA), American Football Coaches Association (AFCA), Walter Camp Foundation (WCFF), The Sporting News (TSN), Sports Illustrated (SI), Pro Football Weekly (PFW), ESPN, CBS Sports (CBS), College Football News (CFN), Scout.com, and Yahoo! Sports (Yahoo!).

Currently, NCAA compiles consensus all-America teams in the sports of Division I-FBS football and Division I men’s basketball using a point system computed from All-America teams named by coaches associations or media sources. The system consists of three points for first team, two points for second team and one point for third team. Honorable mention and fourth team or lower recognitions are not accorded any points. Football consensus teams are compiled by position and the player accumulating the most points at each position is named first team consensus all-American. Currently, the NCAA recognizes All-Americans selected by the AP, AFCA, FWAA, TSN, and the WCFF to determine Consensus All-Americans.

In 2011, there were 7 unanimous All-Americans.

Name	Position	Year	University
Mark Barron	Defensive back	Senior	Alabama
Justin Blackmon	Wide receiver	Junior	Oklahoma St.
Morris Claiborne	Defensive back	Junior	LSU
David DeCastro	Offensive line	Junior	Stanford
Barrett Jones	Offensive line	Junior	Alabama
Whitney Mercilus	Defensive line	Junior	Illinois
Trent Richardson	Running back	Junior	Alabama

== Offense ==
=== Quarterback ===
- Robert Griffin III, Baylor -- CONSENSUS -- (AP-1, FWAA, TSN, CBS, Scout.com, SI, Yahoo!, WCFF-2)
- Andrew Luck, Stanford (AFCA, WCFF, ESPN, PFW, AP-2, Scout.com-2)
- Matt Barkley, Southern California (AP-3)

=== Running back ===
- Trent Richardson, Alabama -- UNANIMOUS -- (AFCA, AP-1, FWAA, TSN, WCFF, CBS, ESPN, PFW, Scout.com, SI, Yahoo!)
- Montee Ball, Wisconsin -- CONSENSUS -- (AFCA, AP-1, FWAA, TSN, CBS, ESPN, Scout.com, SI, Yahoo!, WCFF-2)
- LaMichael James, Oregon (WCFF, AP-2, Scout.com-2)
- David Wilson, Virginia Tech (AP-2, Scout.com-2)
- Bobby Rainey, Western Kentucky (WCFF-2, AP-3)
- Ronnie Hillman, San Diego State (AP-3)

=== Fullback ===
- Jay Prosch, Illinois (PFW)

=== Wide receiver ===
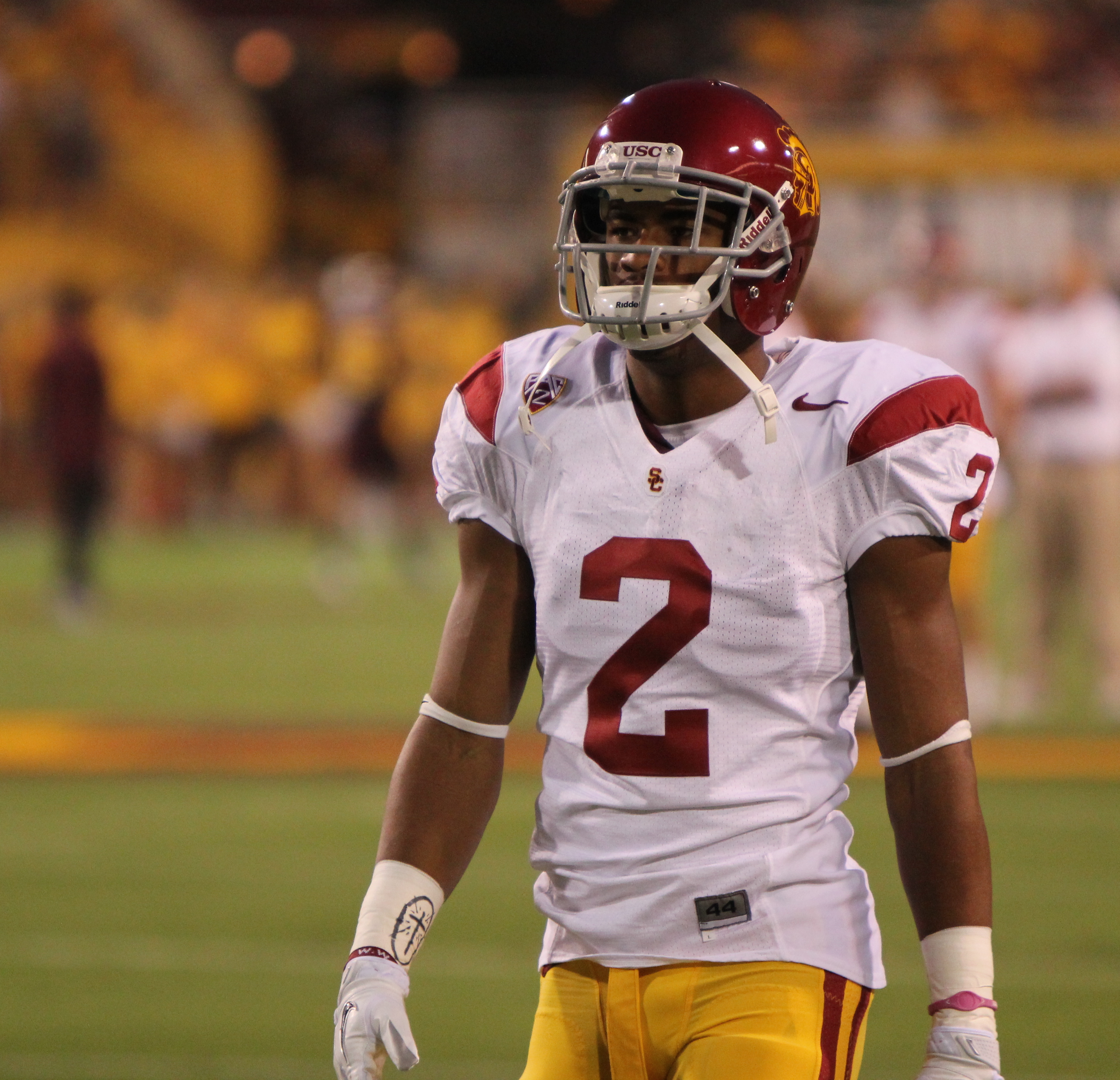
Robert Woods 2011

- Justin Blackmon, Oklahoma State -- UNANIMOUS -- (AFCA, AP-1, FWAA, TSN, WCFF, CBS, ESPN, Scout.com, SI, Yahoo!)
- Ryan Broyles, Oklahoma -- CONSENSUS -- (FWAA, WCFF, AP-2)
- Sammy Watkins, Clemson (PFW, Yahoo!)
- Jordan White, Western Michigan (AFCA, WCFF-2, AP-3)
- Robert Woods, Southern California -- CONSENSUS -- (AP-1, TSN, ESPN, Scout.com, SI, Yahoo!, WCFF-2)
- Kendall Wright, Baylor (CBS, PFW, AP-2, Scout.com-2)
- Patrick Edwards, Houston (Scout.com-2, AP-3)

=== Tight end ===
- Dwayne Allen, Clemson -- CONSENSUS -- (AP-1, FWAA, ESPN, SI)
- Orson Charles, Georgia (AFCA, WCFF-2)
- Tyler Eifert, Notre Dame (WCFF, Scout.com, AP-2)
- Coby Fleener, Stanford (TSN, CBS, PFW, Scout.com-2, AP-3)

=== Tackle ===
- Levy Adcock, Oklahoma State -- CONSENSUS -- (AFCA, FWAA, CBS, ESPN, WCFF-2, AP-3)
- Barrett Jones, Alabama -- UNANIMOUS -- (AFCA, AP-1, FWAA, TSN, WCFF, CBS, ESPN, Scout.com, SI)
- Matt Kalil, Southern California (AP-1, WCFF, PFW, SI, Yahoo!, Scout.com-2)
- Jonathan Martin, Stanford (WCFF, Scout.com, AP-2)
- Kelechi Osemele, Iowa State (SI)
- Nate Potter, Boise State -- CONSENSUS -- (FWAA, TSN, CBS, Yahoo!, AP-2, WCFF-2)
- Riley Reiff, Iowa (PFW)
- Cordy Glenn, Georgia (Scout.com-2, AP-3)

=== Guard ===
- Will Blackwell, LSU (TSN, ESPN, Scout.com, Yahoo!, AP-2)
- David DeCastro, Stanford -- UNANIMOUS -- (AFCA, AP-1, FWAA, TSN, WCFF, CBS, ESPN, PFW, Scout.com, SI, Yahoo!)
- Kevin Zeitler, Wisconsin -- CONSENSUS -- (AFCA, AP-1, PFW, WCFF-2, Scout.com-2)
- Austin Pasztor, LSU (AP-2)
- Ryan Miller, Colorado (WCFF-2, AP-3)
- Lane Taylor, Oklahoma State (Scout.com-2)
- Gabe Ikard, Oklahoma (AP-3)

=== Center ===
- Grant Garner, Oklahoma State (SI, AP-3)
- Ben Jones, Georgia (ESPN, Yahoo!)
- Peter Konz, Wisconsin (AFCA, CBS, PFW, AP-2)
- David Molk, Michigan -- CONSENSUS --(AP-1, FWAA, TSN, WCFF, Scout.com)
- William Vlachos, Alabama (WCFF-2, Scout.com-2)

== Defense ==
=== End ===
- Vinny Curry, Marshall (FWAA, AP-2, WCFF-2, Scout.com-2)
- Melvin Ingram, South Carolina -- CONSENSUS --(AFCA, AP-1, TSN, WCFF, CBS, ESPN, PFW, SI, Yahoo!, Scout.com-2)
- Whitney Mercilus, Illinois -- UNANIMOUS -- (AFCA, AP-1, FWAA, TSN, WCFF, CBS, ESPN, Scout.com, SI, Yahoo!)
- Sam Montgomery, LSU (FWAA, PFW, Scout.com, AP-3)
- Alex Okafor, Texas (AFCA)
- Frank Alexander, Oklahoma (AP-2, WCFF-2)
- Andre Branch, Clemson (WCFF-2, AP-3)

=== Tackle ===
- Fletcher Cox, Mississippi State (PFW, AP-3)
- Brett Roy, Nevada (SI)
- Devon Still, Penn State -- CONSENSUS -- (AP-1, FWAA, TSN, WCFF, CBS, ESPN, PFW, Scout.com, SI, Yahoo!)
- Jerel Worthy, Michigan State -- CONSENSUS -- (AFCA, AP-1, TSN, WCFF, CBS, Scout.com, Yahoo!)
- Joe Vellano, Maryland (AP-2, WCFF-2)
- Derek Wolfe, Cincinnati (AP-2, Scout.com-2)
- Aaron Donald, Pittsburgh (Scout.com-2)
- John Simon, Ohio State (AP-3)

=== Linebacker ===
- Lavonte David, Nebraska (AFCA, CBS, ESPN, Yahoo!, AP-2, WCFF-2)
- Dont'a Hightower, Alabama -- CONSENSUS -- (AFCA, AP-1, WCFF, PFW, Yahoo!, Scout.com-2)
- Jarvis Jones, Georgia -- CONSENSUS -- (AFCA, AP-1, FWAA, WCFF, ESPN, PFW, Scout.com, SI)
- Luke Kuechly, Boston College -- CONSENSUS -- (AP-1, FWAA, TSN, WCFF, CBS, ESPN, Scout.com, SI, Yahoo!)
- Chase Thomas, Stanford (TSN)
- Courtney Upshaw, Alabama (FWAA, TSN, CBS, ESPN, PFW, Scout.com, SI, AP-2, WCFF-2)
- Manti Te'o, Notre Dame (AP-2, WCFF-2, Scout.com-2)
- Sean Spence, Miami (Scout.com-2)
- Tank Carder, TCU (AP-3)
- Sammy Brown, Houston (AP-3)
- Emmanuel Acho, Texas (AP-3)

=== Cornerback ===
- David Amerson, North Carolina State (WCFF, ESPN, AP-2, Scout.com-2)
- Morris Claiborne, LSU -- UNANIMOUS -- (AFCA, AP-1, FWAA, TSN, WCFF, CBS, ESPN, PFW, Scout.com, SI, Yahoo!)
- Dre Kirkpatrick, Alabama (FWAA, CBS, PFW, AP-2, Scout.com-2)
- Tyrann Mathieu, LSU -- CONSENSUS -- (AP-1, FWAA, TSN, WCFF, CBS, ESPN, Scout.com, SI, Yahoo!)
- DeQuan Menzie, Alabama (AFCA)
- Nigel Malone, Kansas State (WCFF-2, AP-3)
- Casey Hayward, Vanderbilt (WCFF-2)
- Brodrick Brown, Oklahoma State (AP-3)

=== Safety ===
- Mark Barron, Alabama -- UNANIMOUS -- (AFCA, AP-1, FWAA, TSN, WCFF, CBS, ESPN, PFW, Scout.com, SI, Yahoo!)
- Markelle Martin, Oklahoma State (AFCA, SI, AP-2, Scout.com-2)
- T. J. McDonald, Southern California (TSN, PFW, Scout.com-2)
- Bacarri Rambo, Georgia (AP-1, Scout.com, Yahoo!, WCFF-2)
- Antonio Allen, South Carolina (AP-2)
- Matt Daniels, Duke (WCFF-2)
- Josh Bush, Wake Forest (AP-3)
- George Iloka, Boise State (AP-3)

== Special teams ==
=== Kicker ===
- Randy Bullock, Texas A&M -- CONSENSUS -- (AFCA, AP-1, TSN, WCFF, CBS, PFW, Scout.com, SI)
- Brett Maher, Nebraska (Yahoo!)
- Quinn Sharp, Oklahoma State (FWAA, AP-3)
- Caleb Sturgis, Florida (ESPN, AP-2, WCFF-2, Scout.com-2)

=== Punter ===
- Ryan Allen, Louisiana Tech (TSN, AP-2, WCFF-2)
- Steven Clark, Auburn (PFW)
- Bobby Cowan, Idaho (FWAA)
- Shawn Powell, Florida State -- CONSENSUS -- (AFCA, WCFF, ESPN, Yahoo!, Scout.com-2, AP-3)
- Brad Wing, LSU (AP-1, CBS, Scout.com, SI)

=== All-purpose / return specialist ===
- Joe Adams, Arkansas -- CONSENSUS -- (FWAA, TSN, ESPN, PFW, Scout.com, AP-2, WCFF-2)
- Tavon Austin, West Virginia (CBS, AP-3)
- LaMichael James, Oregon (AFCA)
- Tyler Lockett, Kansas State (TSN, WCFF)
- Tyrann Mathieu, LSU (CBS, SI, Yahoo!, Scout.com-2)
- Greg McCoy, TCU (CBS, Yahoo!)
- Sammy Watkins, Clemson (AP-1, Scout.com, SI)
- De'Anthony Thomas, Oregon (Scout.com-2)

== See also ==
- 2011 All-Big 12 Conference football team
- 2011 All-Big Ten Conference football team
- 2011 All-Pac-12 Conference football team
- 2011 All-SEC football team
