= 2011 Air Force Falcons football team =

American college football season

2011 Air Force Falcons football

Military Bowl, L 41–42 vs. Toledo
- Conference: Mountain West Conference
- Record: 7–6 (3–4 MW)
- Head coach: Troy Calhoun (5th season)
- Offensive coordinator: Clay Hendrix (5th season)
- Co-offensive coordinators: Blane Morgan (5th season); Mike Thiessen (3rd season)
- Offensive scheme: Triple option
- Co-defensive coordinators: Matt Wallerstedt (3rd season); Charlton Warren (3rd season)
- Base defense: Multiple
- Captain: Game captains
- Home stadium: Falcon Stadium

2011 Mountain West Conference football standings
	Conf.			Overall
Team	W		L	W		L
No. 14 TCU $	7	–	0	11	–	2
No. 8 Boise State	6	–	1	12	–	1
Wyoming	5	–	2	8	–	5
San Diego State	4	–	3	8	–	5
Air Force	3	–	4	7	–	6
Colorado State	1	–	6	3	–	9
UNLV	1	–	6	2	–	10
New Mexico	1	–	6	1	–	11
$ – Conference champion; Rankings from AP Poll

The 2011 Air Force Falcons football team represented the United States Air Force Academy as a member of the Mountain West Conference (MW) during the 2011 NCAA Division I FBS football season. Led by fifth-year head coach Troy Calhoun, the Falcons compiled an overall record of 7–6 with a mark of 3–4 in conference play, placing fifth in the MW. Air Force was invited to the Military Bowl, where the Falcons lost to Toledo. The team played home games at Falcon Stadium in Colorado Springs, Colorado

With wins over Army and Navy, Air Force won the Commander-in-Chief's Trophy for the second consecutive year.

== Schedule ==
Date	Time	Opponent	Site	TV	Result	Attendance	Source
September 3	12:00 p.m.	South Dakota*	Falcon Stadium; Colorado Springs, CO	Mtn.	W 37–20	39,105	
September 10	1:30 p.m.	No. 25 TCU	Falcon Stadium; Colorado Springs, CO	Versus	L 19–35	42,107	
September 24	1:00 p.m.	Tennessee State*	Falcon Stadium; Colorado Springs, CO	Mtn.	W 63–24	33,487	
October 1	10:00 a.m.	at Navy*	Navy – Marine Corps Memorial Stadium; Annapolis, MD (Commander-in-Chief's Trophy)	CBS	W 35–34 ^{OT}	37,506	
October 8	1:30 p.m.	at Notre Dame*	Notre Dame Stadium; Notre Dame, IN (rivalry)	NBC	L 33–59	80,795	
October 13	6:00 p.m.	San Diego State	Falcon Stadium; Colorado Springs, CO	CBSSN	L 27–41	27,490	
October 22	1:30 p.m.	at No. 5 Boise State	Bronco Stadium; Boise, ID	Versus	L 26–37	34,196	
October 29	12:00 p.m.	at New Mexico	University Stadium; Albuquerque, NM	Mtn.	W 42–0	16,691	
November 5	1:30 p.m.	Army*	Falcon Stadium; Colorado Springs, CO (Commander-in-Chief's Trophy)	CBS	W 24–14	46,709	
November 12	12:00 p.m.	Wyoming	Falcon Stadium; Colorado Springs, CO	Mtn.	L 17–25	33,823	
November 19	4:00 p.m.	UNLV	Falcon Stadium; Colorado Springs, CO	Mtn.	W 45–17	24,401	
November 26	4:00 p.m.	at Colorado State	Hughes Stadium; Fort Collins, CO (rivalry)	Mtn.	W 45–21	14,107	
December 28	2:30 p.m.	vs. Toledo*	Robert F. Kennedy Memorial Stadium; Washington, DC (Military Bowl)	ESPN	L 41–42	25,042	
*Non-conference game; Rankings from AP Poll released prior to the game; All times are in Mountain time

== Game summaries ==
=== Navy ===
Team	1	2	3	4	OT	Total
• Air Force	14	7	0	7	7	35
Navy	3	0	7	18	6	34

- Date: October 1
- Location: Navy–Marine Corps Memorial Stadium, Annapolis, MD
- Game start: 12:00 p.m. EST

Scoring summary
1	13:30	AF	Ty MacCurthur 52-yard pass from Tim Jefferson (Parker Herrington kick)	AF 7-0
1	4:45	AF	Tim Jefferson 2-yard run (Parker Herrington kick)	AF 14-0
1	0:14	NAVY	Jon Teague 25-yard field goal	AF 14-3
2	12:26	AF	Asher Clark 23-yard run (Parker Herrington kick)	AF 21-3
3	5:00	NAVY	Kriss Proctor 2-yard run (Jon Teague kick)	AF 21-10
4	14:55	AF	Asher Clark 6-yard run (Parker Herrington kick)	AF 28-10
4	9:34	NAVY	Kriss Proctor 7-yard run (Jon Teague kick)	AF 28-17
4	2:04	NAVY	Jon Teague 37-yard field goal	AF 28-20
4	0:19	NAVY	Gee Gee Greene 5-yard pass from Kriss Proctor (Alexander Teich run)	Tied 28-28
OT		NAVY	Kriss Proctor 1-yard run (kick failed)	NAVY 34-28
OT		AF	Tim Jefferson 1-yard run (Parker Herrington kick)	AF 35-34

=== Army ===
Team	1	2	3	4	Total
Army	14	0	0	0	14
• Air Force	0	0	21	3	24

- Date: November 5
- Location: Falcon Stadium, Colorado Springs, CO
- Game start: 3:30 p.m. EST

Scoring summary
1	9:19	ARMY	Max Jenkins 1-yard run (Alex Carlton kick)	ARMY 7-0
1	1:58	ARMY	Larry Dixon 13-yard run (Alex Carlton kick)	ARMY 14-0
3	11:55	AF	Parker Herrington 37-yard field goal	ARMY 14-3
3	4:54	AF	Tim Jefferson 2-yard run (Asher Clark run)	ARMY 14-11
3	3:35	AF	Parker Herrington 35-yard field goal	Tied 14-14
3	0:15	AF	Tim Jefferson 1-yard run (Parker Herrington kick)	AF 21-14
4	11:49	AF	Parker Herrington 39-yard field goal	AF 24-14

== Personnel ==
=== Depth chart ===
Defense

FS
Chris Miller
⋅

WLB	ILB	ILB	SLB
Jordan Waiwaiole	Brady Amack	Patrick Hennessey	⋅
⋅	⋅	⋅	⋅

SS
Brian Lindsay
⋅

CB
Jon Davis
⋅

DE	NT	DE
Zach Payne	Harry Kehs	Ryan Gardner
⋅	⋅	⋅

CB
Anthony Wright
⋅

Offense

WR
Jonathan Warzeka
⋅

LT	LG	C	RG	RT
Jason Kons	Jordan Eason	Michael Hester	A.J. Wallerstein	Kevin Whitt
⋅	⋅	⋅	⋅	⋅

TE
Joshua Freeman
⋅

WR
Mikel Hunter
⋅

QB
Tim Jefferson
⋅

RB
Asher Clark
⋅

FB
Wes Cobb
⋅
