= Ronnie Hillman =

American football player (1991–2022)

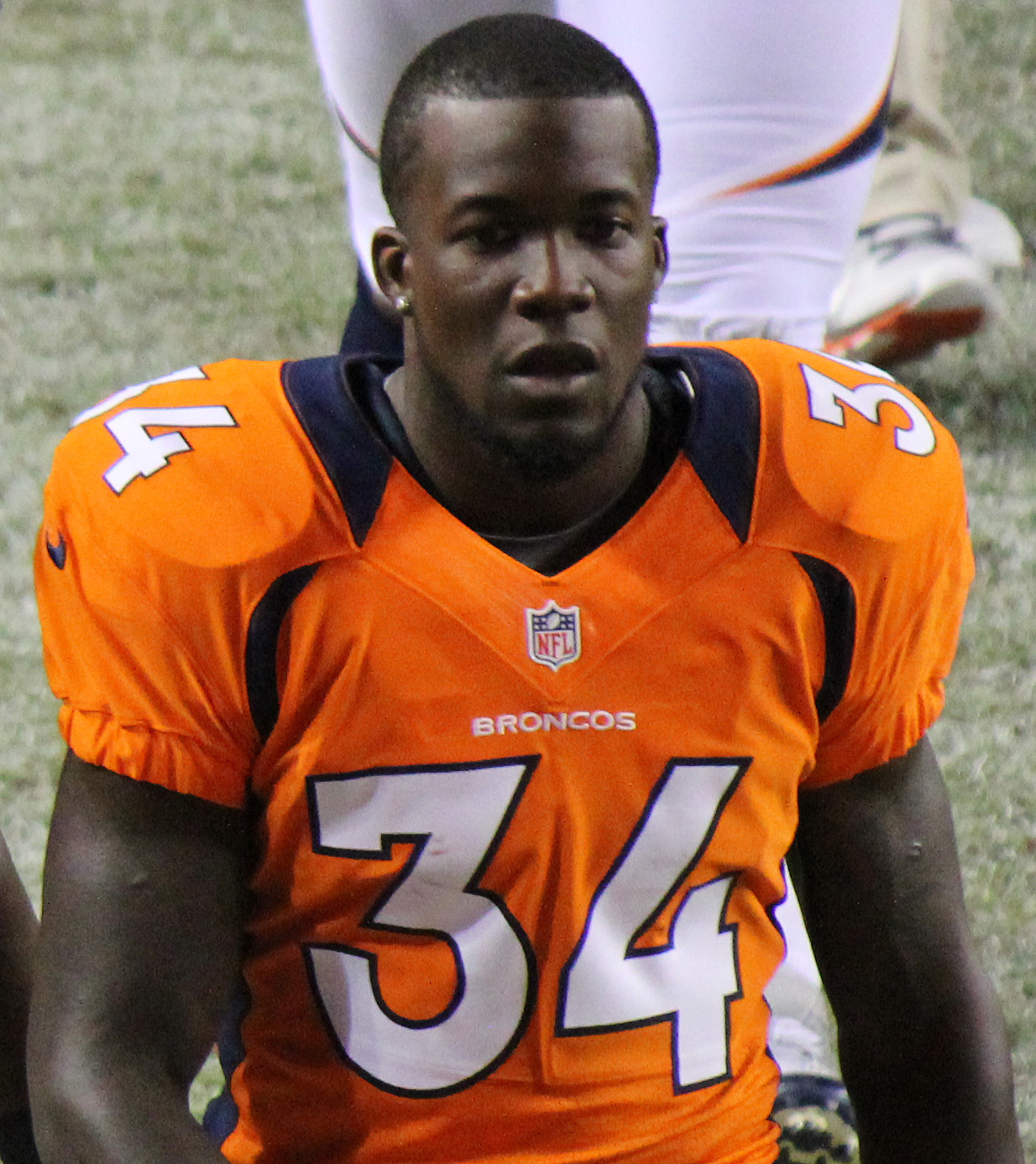
- Hillman with the Denver Broncos in 2012

No. 21, 23, 33, 34, 36
- Position: Running back

Personal information
- Born: September 14, 1991; Long Beach, California, U.S.
- Died: December 21, 2022 (aged 31); Atlanta, Georgia, U.S.
- Listed height: 5 ft 9 in (1.75 m)
- Listed weight: 200 lb (91 kg)

Career information
- High school: La Habra (La Habra, California)
- College: San Diego State (2009–2011)
- NFL draft: 2012: 3rd round, 67th overall pick

Career history
- Denver Broncos (2012–2015); Minnesota Vikings (2016); San Diego Chargers (2016); Dallas Cowboys (2017)*
- * Offseason or practice squad member only

Awards and highlights
- Super Bowl champion (50); Third-team All-American (2011); Freshman All-American (2010); MW Freshman of the Year (2010); 2× First-team All-MW (2010, 2011)

Career NFL statistics
- Rushing yards: 1,976
- Rushing average: 4
- Rushing touchdowns: 12
- Receptions: 74
- Receiving yards: 524
- Receiving touchdowns: 1
- Stats at Pro Football Reference

Ronald Keith Ryan Hillman Jr. (September 14, 1991 – December 21, 2022) was an American professional football player who was a running back in the National Football League (NFL). He played college football for the San Diego State Aztecs, earning third-team All-American honors as a sophomore in 2011. He was selected by the Denver Broncos in the third round of the 2012 NFL draft and was a member of their team that won Super Bowl 50. Hillman later spent time with the Minnesota Vikings, San Diego Chargers, and Dallas Cowboys.

== Early life ==
Hillman was born on September 14, 1991, in Long Beach, California. Growing up in nearby Compton, he played football in a sports league operated by the rapper Snoop Dogg for inner-city youths, and was on an all-star team with fellow future NFL player De'Anthony Thomas. He has four brothers and one sister. During his early years, Hillman highlighted his talents while attending La Habra High School, lettering in basketball, football, and track. In high school football, he played as a running back. In 2008, he was named Southwest Division offensive player of the year after helping lead the Highlanders to the CIF Southern Section Southwest Division championship crown in a season where he amassed 1,615 yards and 20 touchdowns. As a senior in 2009, he was selected MVP of the Freeway League as he accounted for 2,104 all-purpose yards (1,251 rushing yards with 14 touchdowns) and 27 total touchdowns all-purpose yards and led the Highlanders to a 12–2 record and to the 2009 CIF Southern Section Southwest Division title after going 5–0 in the Freeway League and winning the 2009 Freeway League championship. His performance earned him first-team All-County honors by the Orange County Register.

Following his senior season, Hillman was ranked by most recruiting analysts as a "three-star prospect" and considered joining Colorado State, San Diego State, and Fresno State to play college football. He eventually signed with San Diego State University (SDSU) to play for its Aztecs football team.

== College career ==
Hillman sat out the 2009 season while SDSU sorted out administrative issues involving his admission. He took the year off, moved to Atlanta, worked as a waiter at an Applebee's restaurant, and studied for, retook and passed his college-entrance exam, which allowed him to enroll at SDSU.

=== Freshman season ===
As a freshman in 2010, Hillman gained 1,532 yards and scored 17 rushing touchdowns. On September 18, 2010, he gained 228 rushing yards against Missouri in his third college football game. He was named the freshman of the year of the Mountain West Conference (MWC) and was voted a freshman All-American by several publications.

=== Sophomore season ===
As a sophomore in 2011, Hillman was named a third-team All-American by the Associated Press, and earned his second straight first-team All-MWC selection. He rushed for 1,711 yards and 19 touchdowns during the season. He ranked fourth among all players in the NCAA Football Bowl Subdivision with an average of 131.6 rushing yards per game. He ranked third in total rushing yards. He gained over 100 rushing yards in eight of San Diego State's 12 games in 2011. On September 17, 2011, the San Diego State Aztecs faced the 2–0 undefeated Washington State Cougars at Qualcomm Stadium. Hillman scored on four touchdown runs, leading the Aztecs to a 42–24 victory and their first 3–0 start in 30 years. On October 29, 2011, he gained a season-high 224 yards against Wyoming for 2 touchdowns, including a 99-yard touchdown run.

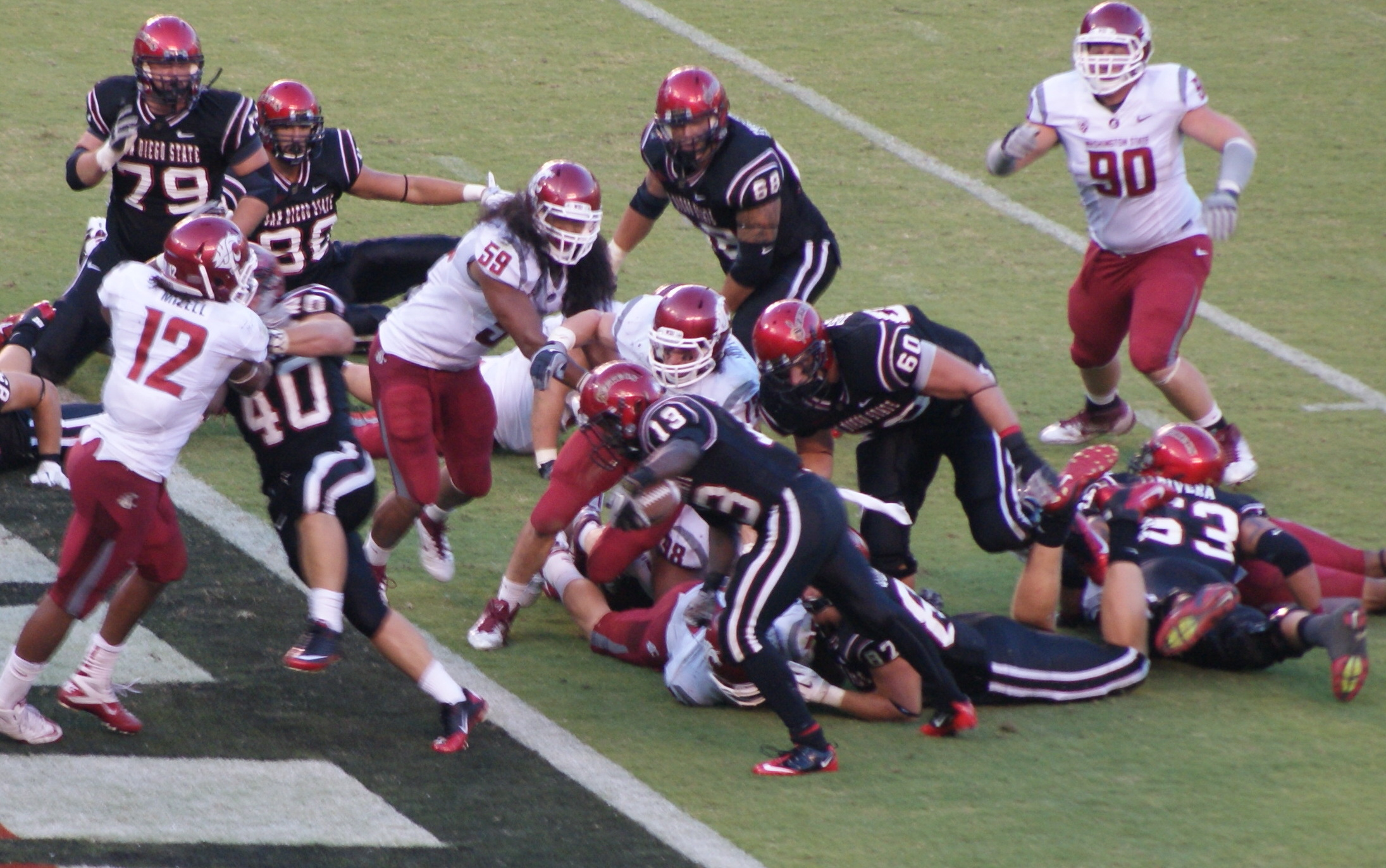
Hillman (No. 13) runs for a 1-yard touchdown against Washington State in 2011.

In January 2012, Hillman announced that he had hired an agent and would be entering the 2012 NFL draft.

== Professional career ==
External videos
- Hillman performing at the 2012 NFL Combine

Pre-draft measurables
Height	Weight	Arm length	Hand span	40-yard dash	10-yard split	20-yard split	Vertical jump	Bench press
5 ft 8 3/4 in (1.75 m)	200 lb (91 kg)	30 in (0.76 m)	8 1/2 in (0.22 m)	4.45 s	1.58 s	2.62 s	37.0 in (0.94 m)	17 reps
All values from NFL Combine

=== Denver Broncos ===
==== 2012 season ====
Hillman was selected in the third round with the 67th overall pick by the Denver Broncos. He signed a four-year deal with the team. In Week 10 against the Carolina Panthers, Hillman scored his first career touchdown on a 5-yard run.

==== 2013 season ====
In Week 3, he scored his second touchdown in the NFL, a 1-yard rushing touchdown to cap a victory against the Oakland Raiders. Hillman was inactive for the post-season as the Broncos reached Super Bowl XLVIII, but lost 43–8 to the Seattle Seahawks.

==== 2014 season ====
After teammate Montee Ball went down with a groin injury, Hillman was announced as the starter. In his first career start, Hillman had his first 100-yard rushing game in a victory at the New York Jets in Week 6. He followed up with another 100-yard rushing game against the San Diego Chargers in Week 8, along with a pair of two-touchdown performances against the San Francisco 49ers in Week 7 and the New England Patriots in Week 9. Unfortunately, a sprained foot sustained during the Broncos' Week 10 win over the Oakland Raiders forced him to miss almost all of the remaining matches of the football season.

==== 2015 season ====
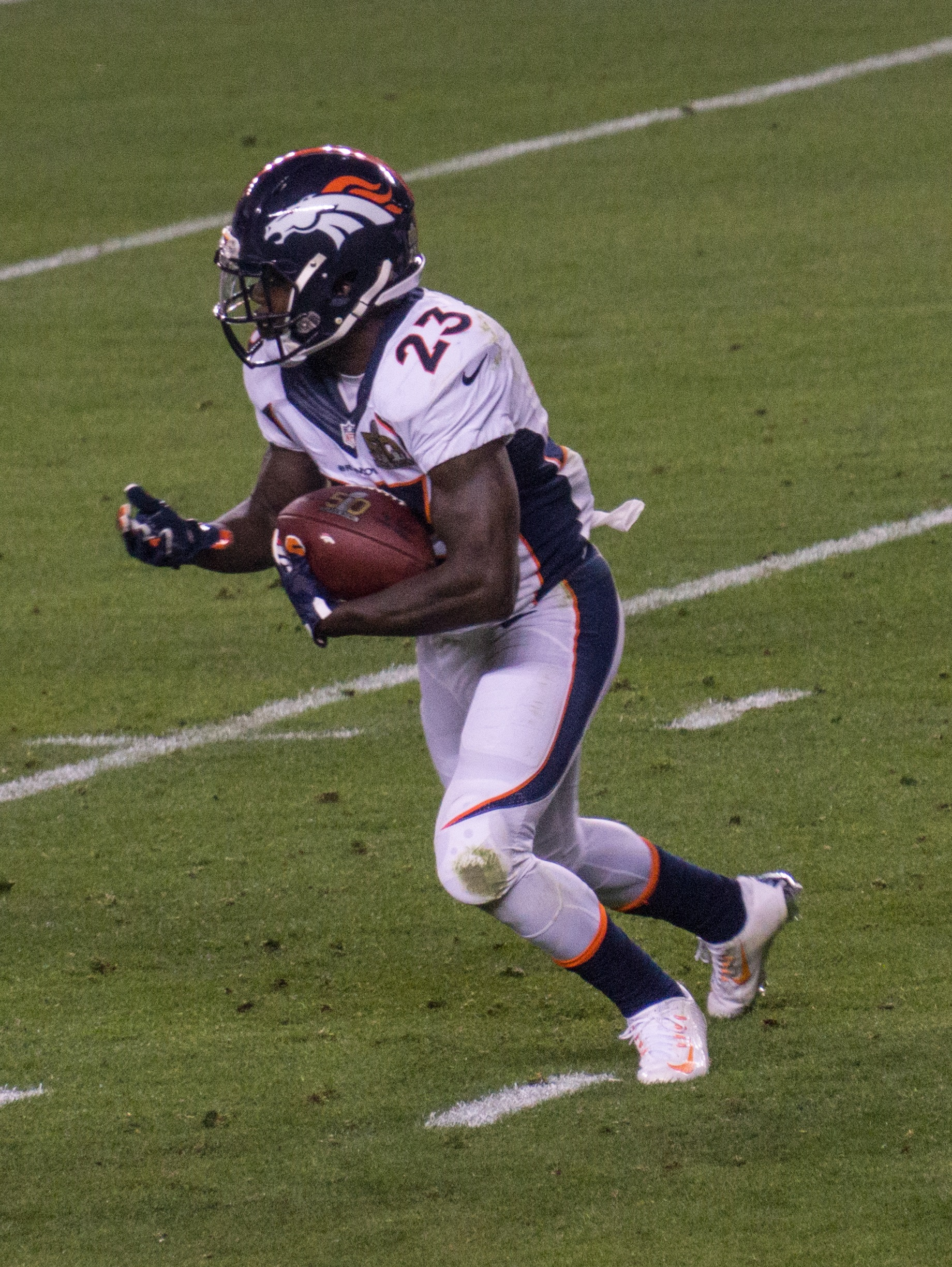
Hillman in Super Bowl 50

Hillman had the most productive season of his career in 2015, playing every game of the regular season and had four 100-yard rushing performances, scoring seven touchdowns and rushed for a team-best 863 yards. In week 4 against the Minnesota Vikings, Hillman ran for a 72-yard touchdown, the longest in his NFL career and the longest touchdown run by a Broncos running back in 15 seasons, tied for the fourth longest in franchise history. In Week 17, his 23-yard touchdown run broke a tie late in the comeback victory over the San Diego Chargers, helping the Broncos finish the season 12–4 and secure the AFC's top seed for the ensuing playoffs. Hillman soon became part of the Broncos team that defeated the Carolina Panthers by a score of 24–10 to win Super Bowl 50; he had five carries for no yards, with his longest rush in the game being for 3 yards. He became the first alumnus from Snoop Dogg's youth football program to win a Super Bowl.

On April 18, 2016, Hillman re-signed with the Broncos on a one-year, $2 million contract. However, he was released by the Broncos before the start of the regular season.

=== Minnesota Vikings ===
On September 21, 2016, Hillman was signed by the Minnesota Vikings after Adrian Peterson suffered an injury in Week 2. After playing five games, in which he had a total of 50 rushing yards on 18 carries and added 43 yards on four catches, he was released by the Vikings on November 21, 2016.

=== San Diego Chargers ===
The following day, on November 22, 2016, the Broncos attempted to re-acquire Hillman, but he was instead claimed off waivers by the San Diego Chargers. He managed to play in three games for the Chargers before the end of the football season.

=== Dallas Cowboys ===
On July 27, 2017, Hillman was signed by the Dallas Cowboys. At the end of the pre-season, he was released by the Cowboys on September 2 that year.

== Career statistics ==
=== NFL ===
Year	Team	Games		Rushing					Receiving					Fumbles	
Year	Team	GP	GS	Att	Yds	Avg	TD	Lng	Rec	Yds	Avg	TD	Lng	Fum	Lost
2012	DEN	14	0	85	330	3.9	1	31	10	62	6.2	0	29	2	1
2013	DEN	10	0	55	218	4.0	1	19	12	119	9.9	0	19	2	1
2014	DEN	8	4	106	434	4.1	3	37	21	139	6.6	1	16	1	0
2015	DEN	16	10	207	863	4.2	7	72	24	111	4.6	0	14	2	1
2016	MIN	5	0	18	50	2.8	0	14	4	43	10.8	0	32	0	0
2016	SD	3	1	23	81	3.5	0	17	3	50	16.7	0	21	0	0
Career		56	15	494	1,976	4.0	12	72	74	524	9.9	1	32	8	3

=== College ===
Year	Team	Rushing					Receiving			
Year	Team	Att	Yds	Avg	Y/G	TD	Rec	Yds	Avg	TD
2010	San Diego State	262	1,532	5.8	117.8	17	9	68	7.6	1
2011	San Diego State	311	1,711	5.5	131.6	19	24	270	11.3	1
Career		573	3,243	5.7	124.7	36	33	338	10.2	2

== Illness and death ==
Hillman was diagnosed with renal medullary carcinoma, a rare form of kidney cancer, in August 2022. The cancer treatments were unsuccessful, and in December 2022, he entered hospice care for the cancer as well as pneumonia. He died on December 21, 2022, at age 31.
