= Phil Emery (American football) =

American football executive (born 1959)

Personal information
- Born: January 16, 1959 (age 67); Detroit, Michigan, U.S.

Career information
- High school: Garden City (MI)
- College: Wayne State

Career history

Coaching
- Central Michigan (1981–1982) Graduate assistant / offensive line; Western New Mexico (1982–1984) Offensive line coach & strength and conditioning; Georgetown College (1984–1985) Defensive line coach & strength and conditioning; Saginaw Valley State (1985–1987) Defensive line coach & strength and conditioning; Tennessee (1987–1991) Assistant strength and conditioning coach; Navy (1991–1998) Strength and conditioning coach

Operations
- Chicago Bears (1998–2004) Scout; Atlanta Falcons (2004–2008) Director of scouting; Kansas City Chiefs (2009–2011) Director of scouting; Chicago Bears (2012–2014) General manager; Atlanta Falcons (2016–2022) Scout

Phillip Emery (born January 16, 1959) is an American former football executive. He served as the general manager of the Chicago Bears from 2012 to 2014 and also held scouting positions with the Kansas City Chiefs and Atlanta Falcons.

== Early life ==
Emery was born and grew up in Michigan and attended high school at Garden City East High School (which is now Garden City High School). He attended college and earned a teaching degree at Wayne State University in Detroit. Emery received his Master of Arts degree in secondary education from Western New Mexico University in 1983.

== NFL scout ==
Emery was an area scout for the Bears from 1998 to 2004, working first under VP of Player Personnel Mark Hatley and then Jerry Angelo while serving head coaches Dave Wannstedt, Dick Jauron and Lovie Smith. He was hired by Rich McKay as the director of scouting for the Atlanta Falcons in May 2004 and served in that role through the 2008 draft. After the 2008 Draft and with the hiring of new Falcons general manager Thomas Dimitroff; Emery worked as the Eastern Regional Scout the fall of 2008 and through the 2009 Draft. Emery was named director of college scouting for the Kansas City Chiefs immediately following the 2009 Draft and remained in that role through the end of the month of January 2012. Prior to the Bears job, he was a graduate assistant football coach at Central Michigan University (1981), offensive line and strength and conditioning coach at Western New Mexico University (1982–1983), defensive line and strength coach at both Georgetown College (1984–1985) and then Saginaw Valley State University (1985-1987), before being named assistant strength and conditioning coach at the University of Tennessee (1987–1991). Emery was hired as the Head Strength and Conditioning Coach and Assistant Professor at the United States Naval Academy (1991–1998).

Emery returned to the Falcons in 2016 as a scout. On May 12, 2023, Emery announced his retirement from the NFL.

== Chicago Bears ==
=== 2012 ===
In 2012, Bears general manager Jerry Angelo was fired. During the team's search, Emery was one of the four candidates, and was one of the two finalists for the job, along with Arizona Cardinals director of pro personnel Jason Licht. After being hired, Bears chairman George McCaskey told Emery that though head coach Lovie Smith's contract ran through 2013, and that Smith would be head coach in 2012, Emery would have the ability to make a change at the position after the end of the 2012 season. Smith was eventually fired on December 31, 2012, after the Bears missed the playoffs, despite having led the team to a 10–6 record.

In Emery's first draft, he selected Shea McClellin, Alshon Jeffery, Brandon Hardin, Evan Rodriguez, Isaiah Frey, and Greg McCoy. Overall, critics had mixed reviews on Emery's debut draft, with the Chicago Sun-Times experts giving the draft an average "C" grade.

On December 31, the Bears front office released long-time head coach Lovie Smith, and Emery began searching for a new head coach.

=== 2013 ===
On January 16, the Bears announced the hiring of Montreal Alouettes head coach Marc Trestman as head coach. Trestman was widely regarded as Emery's pick due to his cerebral approach to the game and ability to improve the performance of the quarterbacks he has worked with.

In Emery's second draft, he selected guard Kyle Long in the first round (20th overall), linebacker Jon Bostic (50th overall), linebacker Khaseem Greene (117th overall), offensive lineman Jordan Mills (163rd overall), defensive end Cornelius Washington (188th overall), and wide receiver Marquess Wilson (236 overall). Reaction was mixed with ESPN's Mel Kiper Jr. giving the whole of the Bears draft a C+ overall grade, stating the late round picks lacked value. However Jason Chilton rated the individual picks more highly in the later rounds. The Bears ended the season with an 8–8 record and failed to make the playoffs.

=== 2014 ===
In Emery's third draft he selected cornerback Kyle Fuller in the first round (1st round, 14th overall), defensive tackle Ego Ferguson (2nd round, 51st overall), defensive tackle Will Sutton (3rd round, 82nd overall), running back Ka'deem Carey (4th round, 117th overall), safety Brock Vereen (4th round, 131st overall), quarterback David Fales (6th round, 183rd overall), punter Pat O'Donnell (6th round, 191st overall), and offensive tackle Charles Leno (7th round, 246th overall). The Bears traded with the Denver Broncos, swapping the Bears' fifth round picks in 2014 and 2015 for the Broncos 4th and 7th picks in 2014. This ended up giving the Bears no fifth round pick, but two additional picks in both the fourth and sixth rounds. Emery also brought in undrafted free agents Jordan Lynch and James Dunbar. Bucky Brooks of NFL.com gave the Bears draft a B, and called the 4th round pick of Carey the draft's biggest steal.

Additionally, Elliot Harrison of NFL.com ranked the Bears offseason moves as the second best in the league based on a strong draft and the additions of free agents defensive ends Jared Allen, Willie Young, Lamarr Houston, Israel Idonije, and quarterback Jimmy Clausen.

On December 29, 2014, Emery was fired from the Bears after the team merited a 5–11 record, their worst since their debut year with Lovie Smith, and, once again, missed the playoffs. A significant, contributing factor to Emery's demise was his directive to extend quarterback Jay Cutler's contract in January 2014 to a lucrative seven-year deal with $126.7 million, of which $54 million was guaranteed. This negotiation has been deemed to be the worst contract in the NFL.

The Bears hired Ryan Pace on January 8, 2015, to replace Emery as the general manager.

== Other roles ==
Emery works as a Football Evaluation Specialist for SūmerSports, and is a featured scout in SūmerSports' NFL draft show The Evaluation.
