= Deon Long =

American football player (born 1991)

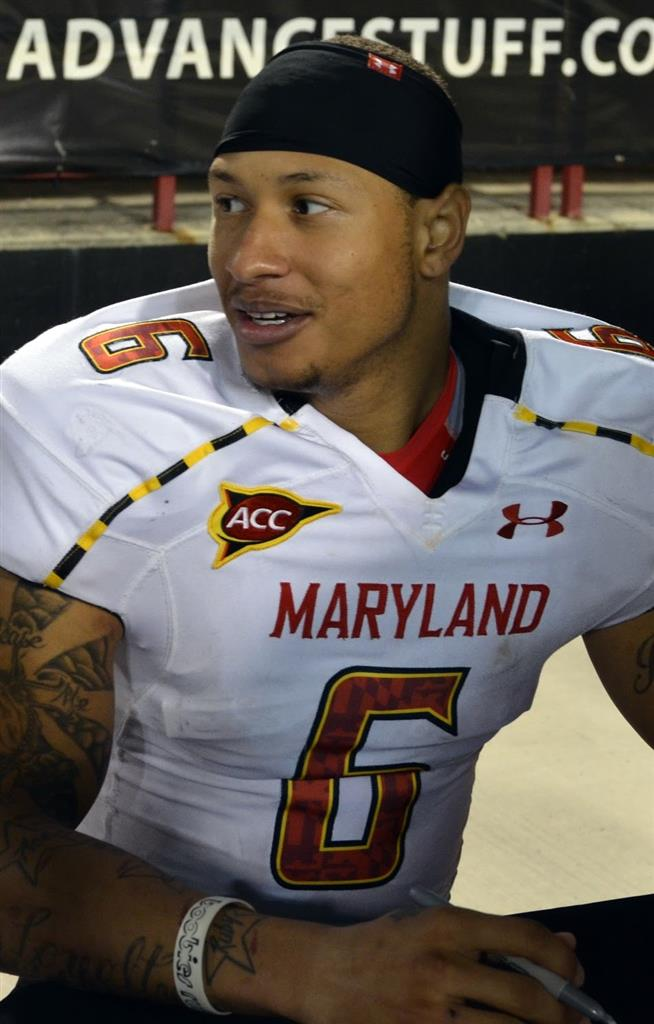
- Long with Maryland

No. 86
- Position: Wide receiver

Personal information
- Born: June 14, 1991 (age 35); Washington, D.C., U.S.
- Listed height: 6 ft 0 in (1.83 m)
- Listed weight: 192 lb (87 kg)

Career information
- High school: Washington (DC) Dunbar
- College: Maryland
- NFL draft: 2015: undrafted

Career history
- Tennessee Titans (2015)*; Miami Dolphins (2015)*; St. Louis / Los Angeles Rams (2015–2016)*; Philadelphia Eagles (2016)*; BC Lions (2016)
- * Offseason or practice squad member only

Awards and highlights
- Second-team All-MWC (2011)
- Stats at Pro Football Reference
- Stats at CFL.ca

Deon Moses Long (born June 14, 1991) is an American former professional football player. He played college football at Maryland his junior and senior years after brief stops at West Virginia, New Mexico and Iowa Western. He was signed by the Tennessee Titans as an undrafted free agent in 2015 and was with the St. Louis Rams from 2015 until 2016.

== Early life ==
Long attended Dunbar High School in Washington DC, where he was a letterman in football, and track and field. Rated as a four-star recruit by Rivals.com, Long was listed as the No. 45 Wide Receiver prospect of the class of 2009. While attending at Dunbar, he was teammates with future Indianapolis Colts Cornerback, Vontae Davis, Jacksonville Jaguars Wide Receiver Arrelious Benn and New Orleans Saints Linebacker Nate Bussey.

In track & field, Long recorded a personal best of 10.83 seconds in the 100 meters. He was also a member of the 4 × 100 m (44.26s) relay squad.

== Professional career ==
=== Tennessee Titans ===
After going unselected in the 2015 NFL draft, Long signed with the Tennessee Titans on May 2, 2015.

=== Miami Dolphins ===
On September 16, 2015, Long was signed to the Miami Dolphins' practice squad for seven days. On September 23, 2015, he was released by the Dolphins.

=== St. Louis / Los Angeles Rams ===
Long signed with the practice squad of the St. Louis Rams on December 24, 2015. On July 31, 2016, Long was released by the Los Angeles Rams for violation of team rules by bringing a woman into his dorm during training camp. Him being cut by Jeff Fisher was shown on the reality series Hard Knocks.

=== Philadelphia Eagles ===
Long signed twice with the Philadelphia Eagles on August 5, 2016, for nine days. He was released by the Eagles on August 14, 2016.

=== BC Lions ===
On October 3, 2016, Long signed to the BC Lions practice squad. He re-signed with the Lions on February 1, 2017.
