= 2011 UNLV Rebels football team =

American college football season

2011 UNLV Rebels football
- Conference: Mountain West Conference
- Record: 2–10 (1–6 MW)
- Head coach: Bobby Hauck (2nd season)
- Offensive coordinator: Rob Phenicie (2nd season)
- Offensive scheme: Multiple
- Defensive coordinator: Kraig Paulson (2nd season)
- Home stadium: Sam Boyd Stadium

2011 Mountain West Conference football standings
	Conf.			Overall
Team	W		L	W		L
No. 14 TCU $	7	–	0	11	–	2
No. 8 Boise State	6	–	1	12	–	1
Wyoming	5	–	2	8	–	5
San Diego State	4	–	3	8	–	5
Air Force	3	–	4	7	–	6
Colorado State	1	–	6	3	–	9
UNLV	1	–	6	2	–	10
New Mexico	1	–	6	1	–	11
$ – Conference champion; Rankings from AP Poll

The 2011 UNLV Rebels football team represented the University of Nevada, Las Vegas (UNLV) as a member of the Mountain West Conference (MW) during the 2011 NCAA Division I FBS football season. Led by second-year head coach Bobby Hauck, the Rebels compiled an overall record of 2–10 record with mark of 1–6 in conference play, placing in a three-way tie for sixth at the bottom of the MW standings. The team played home games at Sam Boyd Stadium in Whitney, Nevada.

== Schedule ==
Date	Time	Opponent	Site	TV	Result	Attendance
September 1	5:00 p.m.	at No. 10 Wisconsin*	Camp Randall Stadium; Madison, WI	ESPN	L 17–51	77,085
September 10	2:00 p.m.	at Washington State*	Martin Stadium; Pullman, WA		L 7–59	27,018
September 17	7:00 p.m.	Hawaii*	Sam Boyd Stadium; Whitney, NV	mtn.	W 40–20	21,248
September 24	6:00 p.m.	No. 23 (FCS) Southern Utah*	Sam Boyd Stadium; Whitney, NV	mtn.	L 16–41	18,102
October 8	4:00 p.m.	at Nevada*	Mackay Stadium; Reno, NV (Fremont Cannon)	ESPN3	L 0–37	25,978
October 15	11:00 a.m.	at Wyoming	War Memorial Stadium; Laramie, WY	mtn.	L 14–41	22,985
October 29	3:00 p.m.	Colorado State	Sam Boyd Stadium; Whitney, NV	mtn.	W 38–35	21,289
November 5	7:30 p.m.	No. 5 Boise State^{†}	Sam Boyd Stadium; Whitney, NV	CBSSN	L 21–48	26,281
November 12	7:00 p.m.	at New Mexico	University Stadium; Albuquerque, NM	mtn.	L 14–21	14,937
November 19	3:00 p.m.	at Air Force	Falcon Stadium; Colorado Springs, CO	mtn.	L 17–45	24,401
November 26	7:00 p.m.	San Diego State	Sam Boyd Stadium; Whitney, NV	mtn.	L 14–31	19,075
December 3	11:30 a.m.	at No. 17 TCU	Amon G. Carter Stadium; Fort Worth, TX	Versus	L 9–56	32,012
*Non-conference game; ^{†}Homecoming; Rankings from AP Poll released prior to the game; All times are in Pacific time
