= 2011 Wyoming Cowboys football team =

American college football season

2011 Wyoming Cowboys football

New Mexico Bowl, L 15–37 vs. Temple
- Conference: Mountain West Conference
- Record: 8–5 (5–2 MW)
- Head coach: Dave Christensen (3rd season)
- Offensive coordinator: Gregg Brandon (1st season)
- Offensive scheme: Spread
- Defensive coordinator: Marty English (3rd season)
- Base defense: 4–3
- Home stadium: War Memorial Stadium

2011 Mountain West Conference football standings
	Conf.			Overall
Team	W		L	W		L
No. 14 TCU $	7	–	0	11	–	2
No. 8 Boise State	6	–	1	12	–	1
Wyoming	5	–	2	8	–	5
San Diego State	4	–	3	8	–	5
Air Force	3	–	4	7	–	6
Colorado State	1	–	6	3	–	9
UNLV	1	–	6	2	–	10
New Mexico	1	–	6	1	–	11
$ – Conference champion; Rankings from AP Poll

The 2011 Wyoming Cowboys football team represented the University of Wyoming as a member Mountain West Conference (MW) during the 2011 NCAA Division I FBS football season. Led by third-year head coach Dave Christensen, the Cowboys compiled an overall record of 8–5 record with mark 5–2 in conference play, placing third in the MW. Wyoming was invited to the New Mexico Bowl, where the Cowboys lost to Temple. The team played home games at War Memorial Stadium in Laramie, Wyoming.

== Schedule ==
Date	Time	Opponent	Site	TV	Result	Attendance	Source
September 3	7:00 p.m.	Weber State*	War Memorial Stadium; Laramie, WY		W 35–32	21,492	
September 10	4:00 p.m.	Texas State*	War Memorial Stadium; Laramie, WY	mtn.	W 45–10	23,248	
September 17	10:00 a.m.	at Bowling Green*	Doyt Perry Stadium; Bowling Green, OH	BCSN, ESPN3	W 28–27	14,813	
September 24	5:30 p.m.	No. 9 Nebraska*	War Memorial Stadium; Laramie, WY	Versus	L 14–38	32,617	
October 8	6:00 p.m.	at Utah State*	Romney Stadium; Logan, UT (rivalry)	KCSG, ESPN3	L 19–63	17,561	
October 15	12:00 p.m.	UNLV^{†}	War Memorial Stadium; Laramie, WY	mtn.	W 41–14	22,985	
October 29	8:00 p.m.	at San Diego State	Qualcomm Stadium; San Diego, CA	mtn.	W 30–27	29,730	
November 5	12:00 p.m.	TCU	War Memorial Stadium; Laramie, WY	mtn.	L 20–31	17,673	
November 12	12:00 p.m.	at Air Force	Falcon Stadium; Colorado Springs, CO	mtn.	W 25–17	33,823	
November 19	12:00 p.m.	New Mexico	War Memorial Stadium; Laramie, WY	mtn.	W 31–10	14,959	
November 26	12:00 p.m.	at No. 7 Boise State	Bronco Stadium; Boise, ID	mtn.	L 14–36	33,773	
December 3	12:00 p.m.	at Colorado State	Hughes Stadium; Fort Collins, CO (Border War)	The Mtn.	W 22–19	17,207	
December 17	12:00 p.m.	vs. Temple*	University Stadium; Albuquerque, NM (New Mexico Bowl)	ESPN	L 15–37	25,762	
*Non-conference game; ^{†}Homecoming; Rankings from AP Poll released prior to the game; All times are in Mountain time

== Game summaries ==
=== Weber State ===
	1	2	3	4	Total
Weber State	7	12	7	6	32
Wyoming	14	7	7	7	35

=== Texas State ===
	1	2	3	4	Total
Texas State	3	7	0	0	10
Wyoming	14	3	14	14	45

=== Bowling Green ===
	1	2	3	4	Total
Wyoming	0	7	14	7	28
Bowling Green	7	7	0	13	27

=== Nebraska ===
	1	2	3	4	Total
#9 Nebraska	7	7	10	14	38
Wyoming	0	7	0	7	14

=== Utah State ===
	1	2	3	4	Total
Wyoming	12	7	0	0	19
Utah State	14	28	14	7	63

=== UNLV ===
	1	2	3	4	Total
UNLV	0	14	0	0	14
Wyoming	20	0	10	11	41

=== San Diego State ===
	1	2	3	4	Total
Wyoming	14	16	0	0	30
San Diego State	13	0	14	0	27

=== TCU ===
	1	2	3	4	Total
TCU	7	10	7	7	31
Wyoming	10	7	3	0	20

=== Air Force ===
	1	2	3	4	Total
Wyoming	6	6	0	13	25
Air Force	7	0	10	0	17

=== New Mexico ===
	1	2	3	4	Total
New Mexico	0	10	0	0	10
Wyoming	7	7	3	14	31

=== Boise State ===
	1	2	3	4	Total
Wyoming	7	0	0	7	14
#7 Boise State	0	13	16	7	36

=== Colorado State ===
	1	2	3	4	Total
Wyoming	7	7	0	8	22
Colorado State	3	3	13	0	19

=== Temple—New Mexico Bowl ===
	1	2	3	4	Total
Temple	7	21	3	6	37
Wyoming	0	7	0	8	15
