= Nate Potter =

American football player and coach (born 1988)

Current position
- Title: Offensive coordinator & tight ends coach
- Team: Boise State
- Conference: MW

Biographical details
- Born: May 16, 1988 (age 38); Denver, Colorado, U.S.
- Education: Boise State University

Playing career
- 2007–2011: Boise State
- 2012–2013: Arizona Cardinals
- Position: Offensive tackle

Coaching career (HC unless noted)
- 2014: Boise State (OQC)
- 2015–2017: Boise State (GA)
- 2018: College of Idaho (OL)
- 2019–2021: Montana State (TE)
- 2022–2023: Boise State (TE/RGC)
- 2024: Boise State (co-OC/TE)
- 2025–present: Boise State (OC/TE)

Accomplishments and honors

Awards
- As a player: Consensus All-American (2011); Third-team All-American (2010); 2× First-team All-WAC (2009, 2010); First-team All-MW (2011)

Nate Potter (born May 16, 1988) is an American football coach and former player who is currently the co-offensive coordinator and tight ends coach for the Boise State Broncos. He played college football as an offensive tackle also for the Broncos, where he was recognized as a consensus All-American. He was selected in the seventh round of the 2012 NFL draft by the Arizona Cardinals. Potter appeared in 21 games over two seasons before the Cardinals released him at the end of the 2014 preseason, after which he began his college coaching career.

== Early life ==
Potter was born in Denver, Colorado. He attended Timberline High School in Boise and was a standout lineman for the Timberline Wolves high school football team.

== College career ==
Potter attended Boise State University, where he played for the Boise State Broncos football team from 2008 to 2011. He grayshirted and later redshirted in 2007. In 2008, he started three games at left tackle and five games at right tackle for the Broncos.

Potter earned ESPN's second-team Academic All-America honors on November 23, 2010. He earned first-team All-WAC honors for the second straight season following the 2010 season. In 2011, Potter was a consensus All-American.

== Professional career ==
Pre-draft measurables
Height	Weight	Arm length	Hand span	40-yard dash	10-yard split	20-yard split	20-yard shuttle	Three-cone drill	Vertical jump	Broad jump	Bench press
6 ft 5 7/8 in (1.98 m)	303 lb (137 kg)	34 5/8 in (0.88 m)	9 5/8 in (0.24 m)	5.36 s	1.86 s	3.07 s	4.67 s	7.49 s	28.5 in (0.72 m)	8 ft 4 in (2.54 m)	22 reps
All values from NFL Combine

Potter was selected by the Arizona Cardinals in the seventh round of the 2012 NFL draft. He played eight games that season. He was released with an injury settlement on August 30, 2014.

== Coaching career ==
He started his coaching career at his alma mater Boise State in 2014 as the offensive quality control coach, then he served as an offensive graduate assistant from 2015 to 2017.

He served as the offensive line coach for the Idaho Coyotes in 2018.

He was hired by the Montana State Bobcats as the tight ends coach, position he held from 2019 to 2021.

He returned to Boise State in 2022 for the tight ends coach and run game coordinator duties. He was promoted to the co-offensive coordinator position in 2024.
