= 2011 New Mexico Lobos football team =

American college football season

2011 New Mexico Lobos football
- Conference: Mountain West Conference
- Record: 1–11 (1–6 MW)
- Head coach: Mike Locksley (3rd season; first 4 games); George Barlow (interim; final 8 games)
- Offensive coordinator: David Reaves (1st season)
- Offensive scheme: Spread option
- Defensive coordinator: George Barlow (1st season)
- Base defense: 3–3–5
- Home stadium: University Stadium

2011 Mountain West Conference football standings
	Conf.			Overall
Team	W		L	W		L
No. 14 TCU $	7	–	0	11	–	2
No. 8 Boise State	6	–	1	12	–	1
Wyoming	5	–	2	8	–	5
San Diego State	4	–	3	8	–	5
Air Force	3	–	4	7	–	6
Colorado State	1	–	6	3	–	9
UNLV	1	–	6	2	–	10
New Mexico	1	–	6	1	–	11
$ – Conference champion; Rankings from AP Poll

The 2011 New Mexico Lobos football team represented the University of New Mexico as a member of the Mountain West Conference (MW) during the 2010 NCAA Division I FBS football season. The Lobos compiled an overall record of 1–11 with a mark of 1–6 in conference play, placing in a three-way tie for sixth at the bottom of the MW standings. The team played home games at University Stadium in Albuquerque, New Mexico.

New Mexico began the season under third-year head coach Mike Locksley, who was fired on September 25, after an 0–4 start. Associate head coach and defensive coordinator George Barlow was appointed interim head coach for the remainder of the season. On November 16, New Mexico announced the hiring of former Notre Dame head coach and ESPN analyst Bob Davie as their new head coach beginning in the 2012 season.

== Schedule ==
Date	Time	Opponent	Site	TV	Result	Attendance	Source
September 3	4:00 p.m.	Colorado State	University Stadium; Albuquerque, NM	The Mtn.	L 10–14	21,454	
September 10	5:00 p.m.	at No. 14 Arkansas*	War Memorial Stadium; Little Rock, AR	ESPNU	L 3–52	52,606	
September 17	1:30 p.m.	Texas Tech*	University Stadium; Albuquerque, NM	Versus	L 13–59	20,674	
September 24	4:00 p.m.	No. 20 (FCS) Sam Houston State*^{†}	University Stadium; Albuquerque, NM		L 45–48 ^{OT}	16,313	
October 1	6:00 p.m.	New Mexico State*	University Stadium; Albuquerque, NM (Rio Grande Rivalry)	The Mtn.	L 28–42	30,091	
October 15	12:00 p.m.	at Nevada*	Mackay Stadium; Reno, NV		L 7–49	15,369	
October 22	12:00 p.m.	at TCU	Amon G. Carter Stadium; Fort Worth, TX	The Mtn.	L 0–69	33,833	
October 29	12:00 p.m.	Air Force	University Stadium; Albuquerque, NM	The Mtn.	L 0–42	16,691	
November 5	6:00 p.m.	at San Diego State	Qualcomm Stadium; San Diego, CA	The Mtn.	L 7–35	28,362	
November 12	8:00 p.m.	UNLV	University Stadium; Albuquerque, NM	The Mtn.	W 21–14	14,937	
November 19	12:00 p.m.	at Wyoming	War Memorial Stadium; Laramie, WY	The Mtn.	L 10–31	14,959	
December 3	4:00 p.m.	at No. 9 Boise State	Bronco Stadium; Boise, ID	The Mtn.	L 0–45	33,878	
*Non-conference game; ^{†}Homecoming; Rankings from AP Poll released prior to the game; All times are in Mountain time

== Personnel ==
=== Roster ===
(as of 9/7/2011)
Quarterbacks: 8 Tarean Austin – Sophomore; 9 Ricardo Young – (redshirt) Freshman; 10 Dustin Walton – Freshman; 12 B.R. Holbrook – (redshirt) Junior; 14 Kevin Chavez – Freshman; 16 Detchauz Wray – (redshirt) Freshman; Wide receivers: 2 Emmanuel McPhearson – (redshirt) Junior; 5 Donnie Duncan – Freshman; 7 Lamarr Thomas – Junior; 9 Michael Scarlett – Senior; 20 Deon Long – (redshirt) Freshman; 80 Daniel Adams – Freshman; 84 Ty Kirk – Junior; 85 Quintell Solomon – Freshman; 87 Jeric Magnant – (redshirt) Freshman; Offensive line: 61 Calvin McDowney – (redshirt) Sophomore; 62 Tomas Rodriguez – (redshirt) Sophomore; 63 Dillon Farrell – Sophomore; 64 J.V. Mason – (redshirt) Sophomore; 65 Zach Boerboom – Freshman; 66 LaMar Bratton – (redshirt) Freshman; 67 Mat McBain – (redshirt) Sophomore; 68 Korian Chambers – Junior; 71 Darryl Johnson – (redshirt) Sophomore; 74 Larry Mazyck – Freshman; 75 Joe Washington – (redshirt) Senior; 76 Dillon Romine – Freshman; 77 Jamal Price – Freshman; 78 Earl Johnson – (redshirt) Freshman	Running backs: 4 Demarcus Rogers – (redshirt) Sophomore; 13 James Wright – (redshirt) Senior; 21 Kasey Carrier – (redshirt) Junior; 22 Crusoe Gongbay – Freshman; 25 Chase Clayton – (redshirt) Freshman; 27 Nathan Struck – Freshman; -- Jhurell Pressley – Freshman; Fullbacks: 37 Chris Biren – (redshirt) Junior; Tight ends: 82 Michael Wilkinson – Freshman; 86 David Georges – Freshman; 89 Andrew Aho – (redshirt) Sophomore; 97 Lucas Reed – (redshirt) Junior	Defensive line: 44 Joseph Harris – Junior; 48 Jaymar Latchison – Senior; 49 Ugo Uzodinma – Junior; 50 Rod Davis – Junior; 57 Mark Hunter – (redshirt) Junior; 60 Jake Carr – (redshirt) Junior; 90 Jacori Greer – Sophomore; 91 Brett Kennedy – (redshirt) Senior; 92 Reggie Ellis – (redshirt) Junior; 98 KevinJo Atkins – (redshirt) Sophomore; 99 Fatu Ulale – Junior; Linebackers: 18 Javarie Johnson – (redshirt) Freshman; 24 Sean Willis – (redshirt) Freshman; 37 Brian Hubbell - (redshirt) Freshman; 38 Zach Daugherty – (redshirt) Freshman; 39 Joe Stoner – Junior; 41 Dallas Bollema – Sophomore; 45 Tevin Newman – Freshman; 46 Spencer Merritt – (redshirt) Junior; 47 A.J. Johnson – Senior; 58 Carmen Messina – Senior	Defensive backs: 1 Zoey Williams – Freshman; 3 Martize Barr – (redshirt) Freshman; 6 Anthony Hooks – Senior; 11 Zach Dancel – Freshman; 15 Meiko Locksley – (redshirt) Freshman; 16 Marcus Washington – (redshirt) Freshman; 17 Freddy Young – Junior; 19 Julian Lewis – Junior; 23 Devonta Tabannah – Freshman; 24 Destry Berry – Junior; 26 Jamal Merritt – Freshman; 27 Jamarr Lyles – (redshirt) Senior; 28 Dylan Chavez – (redshirt) Freshman; 29 DeShawn Mills – (redshirt) Junior; 30 Matt Raymer – (redshirt) Junior; 31 Dante Caro – (redshirt) Sophomore; 32 Deshon Marman – Junior; 33 Carmeiris Stewart – Sophomore; 34 A.J. Butler – (redshirt) Junior; 36 Brandon Branch – Freshman; 47 Emmanuel Fatokun – (redshirt) Sophomore; Punters: 35 Ben Skaer – Sophomore; 83 Greg Rivera – Junior; Place kickers: 12 James Aho – Senior; 87 Zach Rogers – Freshman; 95 Andre Archuleta – (redshirt) Freshman; 96 Jason Allen – (redshirt) Sophomore; 98 Justus Adams – Sophomore; Long Snappers: 54 Evan Jacobsen – (redshirt) Junior

Ricardo Young, Emmanuel McPhearson, Mark Hunter and Carmeiris Stewart left the team after Mike Locksley was fired.

=== Recruiting ===
College recruiting
Name	Hometown	School	Height	Weight	40^{‡}	Commit date
Daniel Adams; WR	Hyattsville, Maryland	Northwestern Senior H.S.	6 ft 3 in (1.91 m)	200 lb (91 kg)	–	Nov 28, 2010
Daniel Adams; WR	Recruit ratings: Scout: Rivals: (75)					
Destry Berry; CB	Orchard Park, New York	Erie C.C.	5 ft 11 in (1.80 m)	185 lb (84 kg)	4.4	Dec 5, 2010
Destry Berry; CB	Recruit ratings: Scout: Rivals: (–)					
Zach Boerboom; TE	Cape Girardeau, Missouri	Central H.S.	6 ft 4 in (1.93 m)	235 lb (107 kg)	–	Feb 2, 2014
Zach Boerboom; TE	Recruit ratings: Scout: Rivals: (45)					
Harvello Buie; LB	Seffner, Florida	Armwood H.S.	6 ft 3 in (1.91 m)	195 lb (88 kg)	–	Feb 1, 2011
Harvello Buie; LB	Recruit ratings: Scout: Rivals: (45)					
Korain Chambers; OL	Yuma, Arizona	Western Arizona C.C.	6 ft 6 in (1.98 m)	330 lb (150 kg)	4.4	Dec 12, 2010
Korain Chambers; OL	Recruit ratings: Scout: Rivals: (–)					
Zach Dancel; ATH	Olney, Maryland	Our Lady of Good Counsel H.S.	6 ft 0 in (1.83 m)	192 lb (87 kg)	4.6	Jan 18, 2011
Zach Dancel; ATH	Recruit ratings: Scout: Rivals: (66)					
Overall recruit ranking: Scout: – Rivals: – ESPN: –
Note: In many cases, Scout, Rivals, 247Sports, On3, and ESPN may conflict in their listings of height and weight.; In these cases, the average was taken. ESPN grades are on a 100-point scale.; Sources: "New Mexico Football Commitments". Rivals.; "2011 New Mexico Football Commits". Scout.; "ESPN". ESPN.; "Scout.com Team Recruiting Rankings". Scout.; "2011 Team Ranking". Rivals.com.
