= Tyler Shoemaker =

American football player (born 1988)

No. 14
- Position: Wide receiver

Personal information
- Born: September 14, 1988 (age 38); Meridian, Idaho, U.S.
- Listed height: 6 ft 1 in (1.85 m)
- Listed weight: 212 lb (96 kg)

Career information
- High school: Mountain View (Meridian)
- College: Boise State
- NFL draft: 2012: undrafted

Career history
- Tampa Bay Buccaneers (2012)*; Kansas City Chiefs (2013)*
- * Offseason or practice squad member only

Awards and highlights
- First-team All-MWC (2011)

Tyler Shoemaker (born September 14, 1988) is an American former football wide receiver. He played college football for Boise State, Tyler was a four year stand out player stacking up 2031 yards receiving on 122 catches with 25 touchdowns in college. He was known as a deep threat with a 16.6 yard per catch average. Shoemaker was often a favorite target of QB Kellen Moore, NCAA game footage of Tyler catching touchdowns appeared during Moore's 2012 featured guest spot on ESPN's "Grudens QB Camp". He was signed by the Tampa Bay Buccaneers as an undrafted free agent in 2012.

== Early life ==
Shoemaker played high school football at Mountain View High School in his hometown of Meridian, Idaho. Shoemaker was a three sport stand out in high school and was letted four times in basketball, three times in football and once for track and field.

== Professional career ==
=== Tampa Bay Buccaneers ===
Shoemaker was signed by the Tampa Bay Buccaneers as an undrafted free agent following the 2012 NFL draft on April 29, 2012. He was waived with a "left squad" designation on May 24, which he later said was a mutual decision by both he and the team.

=== Kansas City Chiefs ===
Shoemaker was picked up through free agency by the Kansas City Chiefs on January 25, 2013. On August 25, 2013, he was cut by the Chiefs.
