= 2011 Colorado State Rams football team =

American college football season

2011 Colorado State Rams football
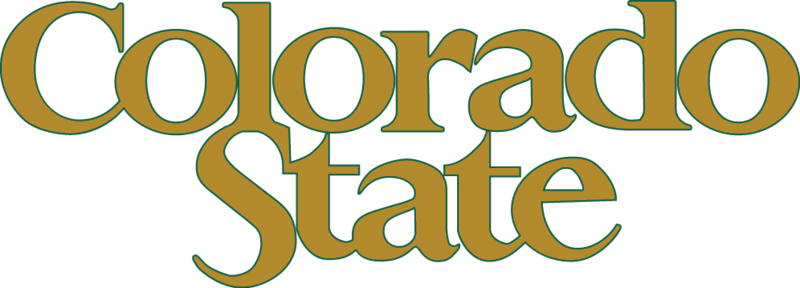
- Conference: Mountain West Conference
- Record: 3–9 (1–6 MW)
- Head coach: Steve Fairchild (4th season)
- Offensive coordinator: Pat Meyer (2nd season)
- Defensive coordinator: Larry Kerr (14th season)
- Home stadium: Sonny Lubick Field at Hughes Stadium

2011 Mountain West Conference football standings
	Conf.			Overall
Team	W		L	W		L
No. 14 TCU $	7	–	0	11	–	2
No. 8 Boise State	6	–	1	12	–	1
Wyoming	5	–	2	8	–	5
San Diego State	4	–	3	8	–	5
Air Force	3	–	4	7	–	6
Colorado State	1	–	6	3	–	9
UNLV	1	–	6	2	–	10
New Mexico	1	–	6	1	–	11
$ – Conference champion; Rankings from AP Poll

The 2011 Colorado State Rams football team represented Colorado State University in the 2011 NCAA Division I FBS football season. The Rams were led by fourth year head coach Steve Fairchild and played their home games at Sonny Lubick Field at Hughes Stadium. They are members of the Mountain West Conference. They finished the season 3–9, 1–6 in Mountain West play to finish in a three-way tie for sixth place.

Head coach Steve Fairchild was fired at end of the season after four year record of 16–33.

== Schedule ==
Date	Time	Opponent	Site	TV	Result	Attendance
September 3	4:00 p.m.	at New Mexico	University Stadium; Albuquerque, NM	The Mtn.	W 14–10	21,454
September 10	12:00 p.m.	Northern Colorado*	Hughes Stadium; Fort Collins, CO	The Mtn.	W 33–14	25,367
September 17	11:30 a.m.	vs. Colorado*	Sports Authority Field at Mile High; Denver, CO (Rocky Mountain Showdown)	FSN	L 14–28	57,186
September 24	6:00 p.m.	at Utah State*	Romney Stadium; Logan, UT	ESPN3/KCSG	W 35–34 ^{2OT}	22,599
October 1	2:00 p.m.	San Jose State*^{†}	Hughes Stadium; Fort Collins, CO	The Mtn.	L 31–38	27,683
October 15	4:00 p.m.	No. 5 Boise State	Hughes Stadium; Fort Collins, CO	The Mtn.	L 13–63	30,027
October 22	6:00 p.m.	at UTEP*	Sun Bowl; El Paso, TX	TWC El Paso	L 17–31	31,797
October 29	4:00 p.m.	at UNLV	Sam Boyd Stadium; Whitney, NV	The Mtn.	L 35–38	21,289
November 12	4:00 p.m.	San Diego State	Hughes Stadium; Fort Collins, CO	The Mtn.	L 15–18	16,811
November 19	3:30 p.m.	at No. 19 TCU	Amon G. Carter Stadium; Fort Worth, TX	Versus	L 10–34	33,650
November 26	4:00 p.m.	Air Force	Hughes Stadium; Fort Collins, CO (Ram–Falcon Trophy)	The Mtn.	L 21–45	14,107
December 3	12:00 p.m.	Wyoming	Hughes Stadium; Fort Collins, CO (Border War)	The Mtn.	L 19–22	17,207
*Non-conference game; ^{†}Homecoming; Rankings from AP Poll released prior to the game; All times are in Mountain time
