= Shea McClellin =

American football player (born 1989)

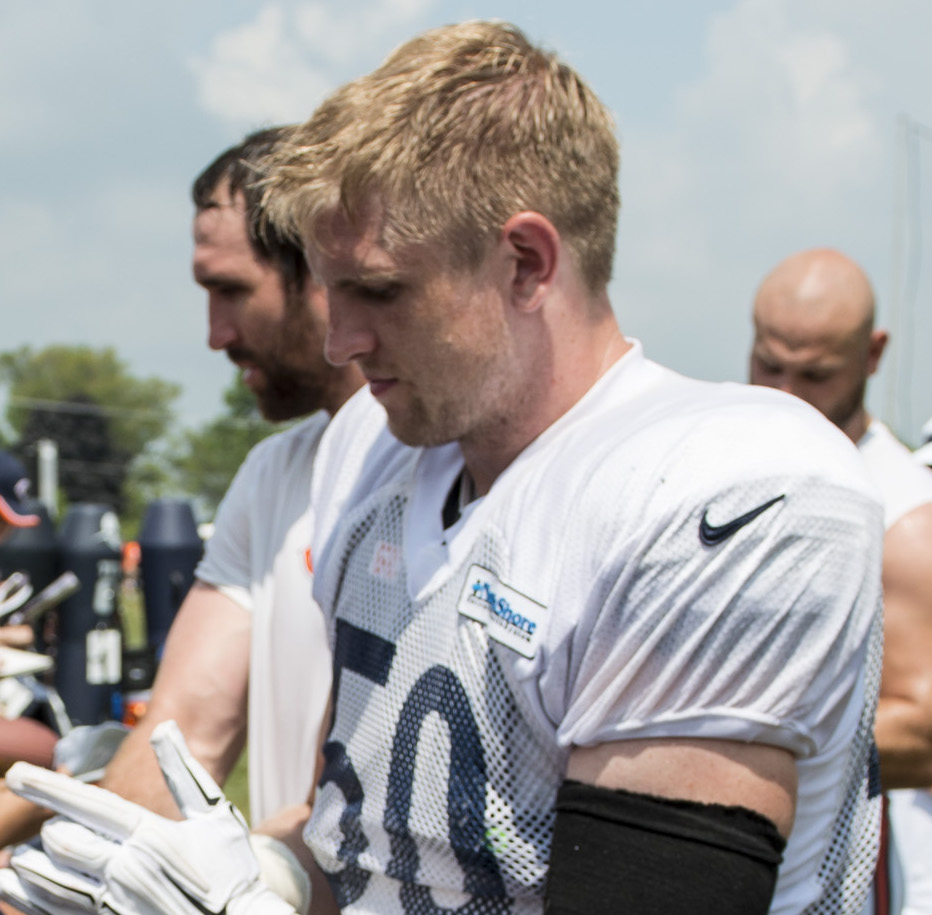
- McClellin with the Chicago Bears in 2015

No. 99, 50, 58
- Position: Linebacker

Personal information
- Born: August 1, 1989 (age 37); Caldwell, Idaho, U.S.
- Listed height: 6 ft 3 in (1.91 m)
- Listed weight: 250 lb (113 kg)

Career information
- High school: Marsing (Marsing, Idaho)
- College: Boise State (2008–2011)
- NFL draft: 2012: 1st round, 19th overall pick

Career history
- Chicago Bears (2012–2015); New England Patriots (2016–2017)

Awards and highlights
- Super Bowl champion (LI); First-team All-MWC (2011); First-team All-WAC (2010); 2A Western Idaho Conference Offensive/Defensive Player of the Year (2006)

Career NFL statistics
- Total tackles: 202
- Sacks: 8.5
- Forced fumbles: 1
- Fumble recoveries: 3
- Stats at Pro Football Reference

Shea Keegan McClellin (born August 1, 1989) is an American former professional football player who was an outside linebacker in the National Football League (NFL). He played college football for the Boise State Broncos. He was selected by the Chicago Bears with the 19th overall pick in the 2012 NFL draft.

== Early life ==
McClellin was born on August 1, 1989, in Caldwell, Idaho, and lived in Marsing. McClellin was adopted by his maternal grandparents, Terry and Jerry McClellin, when he was 18 months old. He grew up on a farm in Caldwell, where he helped his parents raise various farm animals and animals in distress.

McClellin went to Marsing High School, where he was a letterman in football, basketball, and baseball. As a linebacker, he finished with 126 tackles, six interceptions and seven defensive touchdowns. McClellin also played running back, running for 1,893 yards and 22 touchdowns. In his junior year, he was named to the second-team all-conference team after rushing for 998 yards and leading his team in touchdowns with 17. In his senior year, he was named Western Idaho Conference Offensive Player of Year and Defensive Player of Year, as well as first-team all-state. In basketball, he averaged 16.7 points and 11.6 rebounds per game, and in baseball he had a .453 batting average, with 21 RBI and 10 stolen bases as a junior.

College recruiting
Name	Hometown	School	Height	Weight	40^{‡}	Commit date
Shea McClellin; Defensive end	Marsing, Idaho	Marsing High School	6 ft 3 in (1.91 m)	228 lb (103 kg)	4.81	Dec 17, 2006
Shea McClellin; Defensive end	Recruit ratings: Scout: Rivals:					
Overall recruit ranking: Scout: 57 Rivals: 68
‡ Refers to 40-yard dash; Note: In many cases, Scout, Rivals, 247Sports, On3, and ESPN may conflict in their listings of height, weight and 40 time.; In these cases, the average was taken. ESPN grades are on a 100-point scale.; Sources: "2007 Boise St. Football Commitment List". Rivals.; "2007 Boise State Commits". Scout.; "Scout.com Team Recruiting Rankings". Scout.; "2007 Team Ranking". Rivals.com.

== College career ==
McClellin attended Boise State University from 2008 to 2011. During his career he had 130 tackles, 20.5 sacks, four interceptions and two touchdowns.

After he was drafted, a dispute arose about his concussion history during his time with the Broncos, triggered by an NFL Network report claiming that he had three concussions during his college career and McClellin claiming that he only had one. When asked about this, McClellin stated that he had concussion-like symptoms, rather than a concussion.

In his second freshman year, after redshirting his first, McClellin played in 10 games before injuring his leg against Idaho. During his first year, he recorded 14 tackles and 3 forced fumbles. McClellin recorded a sack and forced a fumble against Hawaii, as well as blocking a field goal attempt against Oregon. The Broncos would finish undefeated, but would lose to TCU in the 2008 Poinsettia Bowl. He played in all 13 games for the Broncos, including starts in the final 11 in 2009. McClellin recorded 36 tackles, six tackles-for-loss and three sacks, as well as recording an interception and two pass break-ups. McClellin recorded at least one tackle in 12 games. His lone interception of the season came against Utah State. Like the year before, the Broncos went undefeated, and ultimately avenged their loss to TCU the year before, this time in the 2010 Fiesta Bowl.

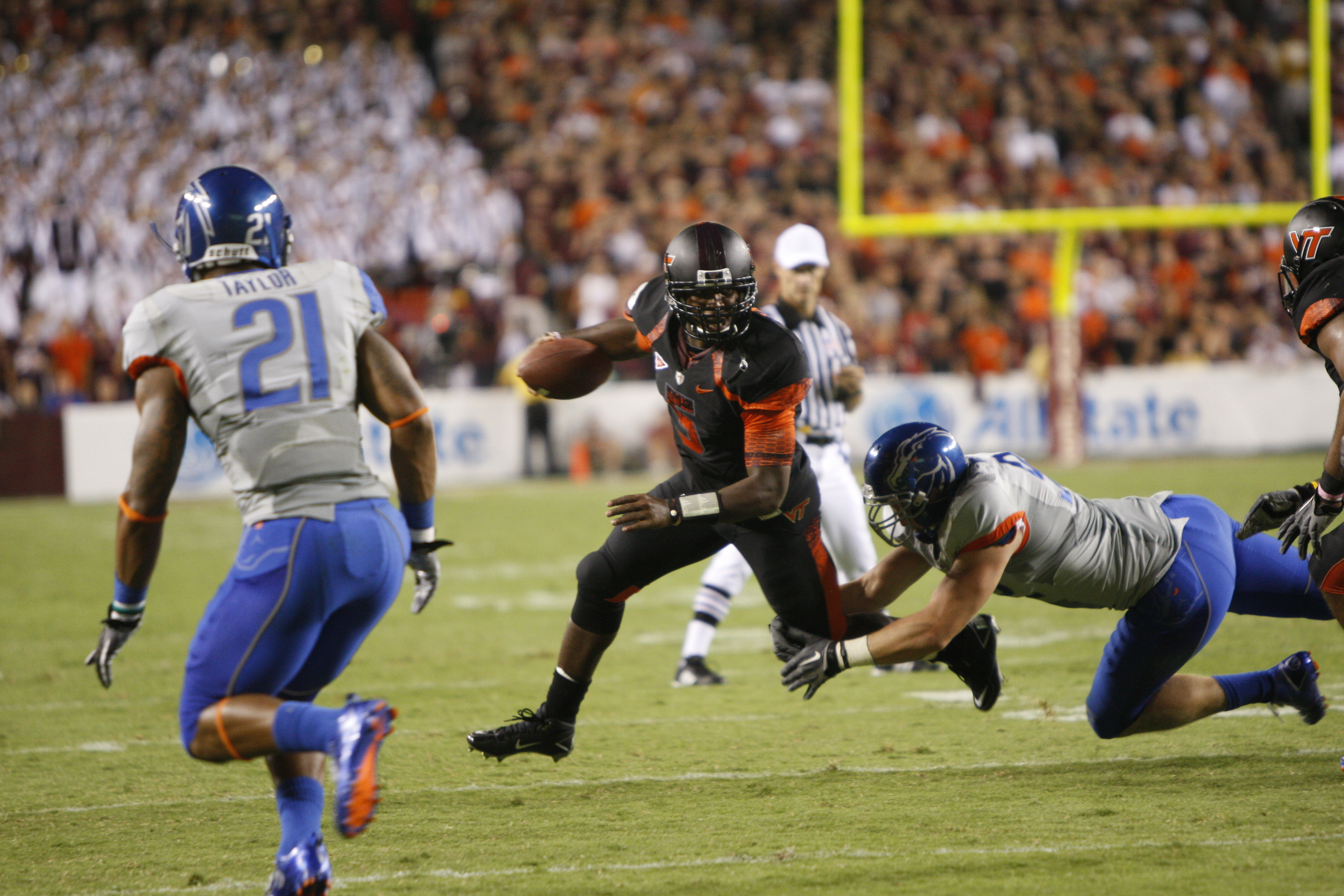
McClellin (far right) tackling Virginia Tech's quarterback Tyrod Taylor

In McClellin's junior year, he recorded 30 tackles on the season, including 13.5 tackles-for-loss – tied for the most on the team – and a team-high 9.5 sacks. He tied his career high with six tackles against Virginia Tech in the team's 2010 season opener. McClellin also forced one fumble and recovered two, one of which was returned for a touchdown against Wyoming, and returned an interception 36 yards for a touchdown against the Toledo Rockets, becoming the first Bronco defensive player to score on a fumble recovery and an interception in the same season since 1999. Boise State would ultimately go to the 2010 Maaco Bowl Las Vegas, and triumph over the Utah Utes. In his final season, McClellin registered 50 tackles, 7 sacks and 12.5 tackles-for-loss. He intercepted two passes, one each against Colorado State and San Diego State, as well as having blocked a kick against the Rams. He recorded a career-high eight tackles against UNLV, as well as a career-high 2.5 sacks against Georgia in the season-opener. In his final game of his college career, McClellin recorded 3 tackles for losses in the victory against the Arizona State Sun Devils in the 2011 Maaco Bowl Las Vegas. He completed the season tied for 15th among active players in career sacks (20.5). McClellin eventually participated in the 2012 Senior Bowl.

== Professional career ==
=== 2012 NFL draft ===
External videos
- McClellin's NFL Combine workout
- McClellin gets drafted by Chicago

Pre-draft measurables
Height	Weight	Arm length	Hand span	Wingspan	40-yard dash	10-yard split	20-yard split	20-yard shuttle	Three-cone drill	Vertical jump	Broad jump	Bench press
6 ft 3 3/8 in (1.91 m)	260 lb (118 kg)	32 3/4 in (0.83 m)	10 1/8 in (0.26 m)	6 ft 5 1/8 in (1.96 m)	4.63 s	1.59 s	2.69 s	4.33 s	7.07 s	31.5 in (0.80 m)	9 ft 10 in (3.00 m)	19 reps
All values from NFL Combine

Before the draft, McClellin was projected as a mid-round pick, but after the Combine, McClellin emerged as a first-round draft pick, with mock drafts having him going to a team that runs the 3–4 defense like the Green Bay Packers or the New England Patriots, praising his work ethic and size, but questioned his strength. Chicago Bears general manager Phil Emery stated that he intended on drafting McClellin as an outside linebacker during his time with the Kansas City Chiefs. McClellin later worked out for 11 teams, including the Patriots, Chiefs, Buffalo Bills, Tennessee Titans, Indianapolis Colts and the Cleveland Browns. Analysts believed that he could go to the Bears, Packers, San Diego Chargers, Baltimore Ravens, Houston Texans, Pittsburgh Steelers or the New York Jets.

Ultimately, he ended up going to the Bears with the 19th pick in the first round of the draft. According to the Bears website, NFL analyst Michael Lombardi was the lone analyst to project McClellin going to the Bears.

"He's one of the two fastest risers I've had in the last month. I didn't think a 4–3 team would take him. He's got so much versatility, but I love the football player. … He can put his hand in the dirt, and across from Julius Peppers, he will get a lot of one-on-one opportunities."

— Mike Mayock, former NFL safety, NFL Network analyst, and former general manager of the Oakland Raiders

=== Chicago Bears ===
After getting drafted by Chicago, Emery stated that McClellin would play opposite Julius Peppers at left defensive end, with Chicago Sun-Times writer Sean Jensen saying that McClellin could replace middle-linebacker Brian Urlacher in the event that he leaves the team or retires. McClellin was signed to a four-year contract on May 11. McClellin made his NFL debut in week one of the preseason against the Denver Broncos, recording three tackles, one sack (on former Bear Caleb Hanie), one tackle-for-loss, and two quarterback hits. McClellin was penalized for a helmet-to-helmet hit on Hanie, setting up a Broncos field goal; even though the kick missed, the Bears would lose 31-3. McClellin recorded his first official sack on Green Bay Packers quarterback Aaron Rodgers, as McClellin recorded 1.5 sacks and four tackles. In the opening minutes of Week 10 against the Houston Texans, McClellin went out with a concussion. McClellin was later injured again when he sprained his MCL against the Minnesota Vikings in Week 14.

In Week 9 of 2013 against the Packers, McClellin recorded three sacks, one of which knocked Rodgers out of the game. McClellin was eventually named the NFC Defensive Player of the Week. However, McClellin suffered a hamstring injury on November 7 during practice, and missed the next two games. After the 2013 season ended, the Bears announced plans to start McClellin at strong-side linebacker. Chicago Bears senior writer Larry Mayer confirmed the switch on March 24, 2014, and stated that McClellin will switch to #50 in conjunction with the position switch. On April 29, 2015, the Bears announced that they would not be picking up the fifth-year option of McClellin's contract. McClellin recorded a career-high in tackles in 2015 with 81, one more than he had recorded in his previous three seasons put together.

=== New England Patriots ===
On March 16, 2016, McClellin signed a three-year contract with the New England Patriots. The contract had a total value of approximately $9 million with $3.5 million guaranteed. On December 12, 2016, during Monday Night Football, McClellin leaped over Ravens long snapper Morgan Cox to block a Justin Tucker kick, causing the first and only missed field goal of the season for Tucker. On January 1, 2017, he returned a fumble 69 yards in the Week 17 victory over the Miami Dolphins, the longest return in Patriots franchise history. On February 5, 2017, McClellin started at linebacker in the Patriots' Super Bowl LI 34–28 overtime victory over the Atlanta Falcons. During the game, McClellin jumped over the line during an extra point attempt, as he had against the Baltimore Ravens, blocking the kick, but was called for jumping over the center, which on video review seemed to be incorrect, as he appeared to jump over the guard.

On September 4, 2017, McClellin was placed on injured reserve. Without McClellin, the Patriots reached Super Bowl LII, but were defeated by the Philadelphia Eagles.

On March 19, 2018, McClellin was released by the Patriots. On May 29, 2018, Yahoo Sports published an article detailing the possible retirement of McClellin. McClellin decided to retire due to concussion issues.

== Career statistics ==
=== NFL ===
Year	Team	GP	Comb	Solo	Ast	Sack	Sfty	FF	PD	Int
2012	CHI	14	14	7	7	2.5	0	0	0	0
2013	CHI	14	30	14	16	4.0	0	0	0	0
2014	CHI	12	36	24	12	1.0	0	0	1	0
2015	CHI	12	81	53	28	0.0	0	1	1	0
2016	NE	14	41	16	25	1.0	0	0	0	0
Total		66	202	114	88	8.5	0	1	2	0

=== College ===
Season	Games		Defense					
Season	GP	GS	Tkl	FF	FR	Sck	Int	TD
2008	10	1	14	3	0	1.0	0	0
2009	13	11	36	2	0	3.0	1	0
2010	13	13	30	0	2	9.5	1	1
2011	13	13	50	1	1	7.0	2	0
Totals	49	38	130	6	3	20.5	4	1

== Personal life ==
In 2012, McClellin became a partner with Allstate and Give Your Sole, and attended the Chicago 13.1 Marathon on June 9 to encourage runners to donate athletic shoes. On June 8, McClellin and the rest of the 2012 Bears draft class planted trees and shrubs at LaFollette Park as part of the team's Save Da Planet program.
