= Steve Fairchild =

American football player and coach (born 1958)

Biographical details
- Born: June 21, 1958 (age 68); Decatur, Illinois, U.S.

Playing career
- 1976–1977: San Diego Mesa
- 1978–1980: Colorado State
- Position: Quarterback

Coaching career (HC unless noted)
- 1982–1983: San Diego Mesa (OCQB/WR)
- 1984–1985: Ferris State (OC/QB/RB)
- 1986: San Diego State (TE/RC)
- 1987–1988: New Mexico (QB)
- 1989: New Mexico (OC/QB)
- 1990–1992: San Diego State (QB)
- 1993–1996: Colorado State (QB)
- 1997–2000: Colorado State (OC)
- 2001–2002: Buffalo Bills (RB)
- 2003–2005: St. Louis Rams (OC/QB)
- 2006–2007: Buffalo Bills (OC)
- 2008–2011: Colorado State
- 2012: San Diego Chargers (OA)
- 2013–2015: Virginia (OC/QB)
- 2017: The Spring League
- 2020–present: Alphas

Head coaching record
- Overall: 16–33
- Bowls: 1–0

Stephen Thomas Fairchild (born June 21, 1958) is an American football coach and former player who is the head coach of the Alphas of The Spring League. He served as head football coach at Colorado State University from 2008 to 2011, compiling a record of 16–33.

== Early life ==
Fairchild was born in Decatur, Illinois. He graduated from Patrick Henry High School in San Diego, CA in 1976. Fairchild is a 1981 graduate of Colorado State, where he spent three seasons as a quarterback and earned All-WAC second-team honors behind BYU's Jim McMahon. Fairchild also excelled in the classroom at Colorado State, earning first-team academic all-conference honors, the Merill Gheen Award for athletic and academic achievement and the NCAA District Athletic Achievement Award. He earned a Bachelor of Arts in economics from Colorado State and later a master of education from Azusa Pacific in 1983.

== Playing career ==
Fairchild initially attended and played football for San Diego Mesa College, where he was named an All-American. In 1978, he transferred to Colorado State University, where he played quarterback until 1980. He split playing time with Keith Lee for his first two seasons, and was red-shirted in 1979. In his final year playing with the team, he was the full-time starter and scored 15 touchdowns while throwing for 2,573 yards. Fairchild graduated from Colorado State University in 1980 with a degree in economics.

== Coaching career ==
=== College ===
After graduating from CSU, Fairchild returned to San Diego Mesa Community College where he held the head coaching job for a number of years. From 1986 through 1993, Fairchild held assistant coaching jobs at University of New Mexico and at San Diego State University. In 1993, he returned to Colorado State University, where he served as quarterbacks' coach until 1996, after which he was promoted to offensive coordinator. During his time as an assistant coach at Colorado State, the team won a total of five conference titles. In January 2013, Fairchild was hired by Mike London at the University of Virginia as offensive coordinator and quarterbacks coach.

=== NFL ===
In 2001, Fairchild was hired by the Buffalo Bills to serve as running backs' coach. He left for the St. Louis Rams in 2003 where he served as an assistant offensive coordinator for three seasons, before returning to the Bills in 2006 for a season-and-a-half as the offensive coordinator. Fairchild returned to the NFL in 2012 and was with the San Diego Chargers as Senior Offensive Assistant/Special Assignments before moving to the University of Virginia in January 2013.

=== The Spring League ===
He was a coach in The Spring League in 2017.

=== Colorado State ===
In December 2007, Colorado State University announced that Fairchild would be returning to his alma mater to serve as head coach. Fairchild succeeded Sonny Lubick, under whom he had previously been an assistant. During Fairchild's tenure as an assistant, CSU had been a mid-major power, but upon his arrival their fortunes had slipped, as the program went 17–31 in Lubick's final four years.

CSU surprised in its first year under Fairchild. After a 38–17 loss to Colorado in his debut, Fairchild won his first game with CSU, a home victory over Sacramento State 23–20 thanks to a Ben DeLine field goal. The Rams followed that up with a 28–25 win over Houston one week later. However, CSU would lose 5 of their next 7 games, including tight home losses to conference powers TCU (13–7) and BYU (45–42). CSU rallied to win their final two games, with their 31–20 victory at Wyoming securing their sixth win and a berth in the New Mexico Bowl. Underdogs to Fresno State, CSU won a 40–35 thriller for their first bowl victory since the 2001 New Orleans Bowl. The star of the game (and most of the season) was senior RB Gartrell Johnson, who ran for a career-high 285 yard and added 90 receiving yards. His 375 total yards were the most for one player in bowl history. He ran for two touchdowns, the final being a game winning 77-yard touchdown run in the fourth quarter. Johnson would be named first team all-MWC following the season. Fairchild became the first coach in CSU history to post a winning season in his first year with the program.

Despite graduating Johnson and several other seniors, 2009 started much the way 2008 ended. The Rams opened the season September 6 at arch-rival Colorado. With a bevy of returning starters, and the game being played in Boulder for the final time (both schools had agreed to play the next decade's worth of games at Invesco Field at Mile High Stadium), the Buffs were heavy favorites. However, CSU led from start to finish, beating Colorado 23–17, marking their first victory at Folsom Field since 1986. Following home victories over Weber State and Nevada, the 3–0 Rams appeared headed to postseason yet again. However, the season would derail quickly. Following a 42–23 loss at ranked-BYU, the Rams dropped a 31–29 decision at Idaho followed by 24–17 home defeat to Utah. They were the first of four losses that would come by seven points or less. The Rams would not win another game for the rest of the season. A loss to previously winless New Mexico (29–27) assured CSU of a last place finish, and a 17–16 home defeat to Wyoming the day after thanksgiving not only cost the Rams the Bronze Boot (and their first home loss to Wyoming in 12 years), but made CSU just the 3rd team in Mountain West Conference history to go winless in conference play (Wyoming having done so in 2000 and 2001).

In 2010, The Rams finished with an identical 3–9 record with their lone wins home victories over lowly Idaho, New Mexico and UNLV. Blowouts were frequent and the most embarrassing came in the season's final two games. On senior day the Rams were shelled by Brigham Young 49–10. The following week they concluded their season with a 44–0 drubbing by rival Wyoming in the Border War. Wyoming hadn't won a single conference game until that dominating win over Colorado State.

It was hoped that Colorado State would begin to turn the corner in 2011, Fairchild's fourth year. Despite a 28–14 loss to rival Colorado, the Rams started 3–1 highlighted by a dramatic 35–34 comeback win in double overtime at Utah State on September 24. It would be CSU's final win. The following week CSU fell 38–31 to San Jose State on homecoming, the start of an 8-game losing streak. Fairchild was fired by new athletic director Jack Graham on December 4, 2011, one day after his Rams lost to the Wyoming Cowboys in the Border War. It was their third straight loss to Wyoming and the third straight time CSU finished their season 3–9.

=== Alphas ===
Fairchild was named head coach of the Alphas of The Spring League on October 15, 2020.

Currently Fairchild is a Football Player Development instructor for the online sports-career training school Sports Management Worldwide.

== Personal life ==
Fairchild is married to the former Nancy A. Kolstoe. They have two daughters, Lindsey and Jill.

=== Head coaching record ===
Year	Team	Overall	Conference	Standing	Bowl/playoffs
Colorado State Rams (Mountain West Conference) (2008–2011)
2008	Colorado State	7–6	4–4	5th	W New Mexico
2009	Colorado State	3–9	0–8	9th	
2010	Colorado State	3–9	2–6	T–6th	
2011	Colorado State	3–9	1–6	T–6th	
Colorado State:		16–33	7–24		
Total:		16–33			
