= Dave Christensen =

American football player and coach (born 1961)

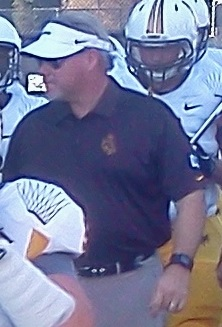
- Christensen in 2013

Profile
- Position: Head coach

Personal information
- Born: January 17, 1961 (age 65); Everett, Washington, U.S.

Career information
- College: Washington (1980–1982)
- NFL draft: 1983: undrafted

Career history
- Western Washington (1983) Running backs coach; Sehome (1984) Offensive line & defensive line coach; Everett (WA) (1985) Offensive line & defensive line coach; Eastern Washington (1986–1987) Offensive line & defensive line coach; Spokane Falls (1988) Head coach; Washington (1989–1990) Offensive line coach; Idaho State (1990–1991) Offensive line, tight ends & running backs coach; Toledo (1992–1996) Offensive line coach; Toledo (1997–2000) Offensive coordinator; Missouri (2001–2008) Offensive coordinator; Wyoming (2009–2013) Head coach; Utah (2014) Offensive coordinator & tight ends coach; Texas A&M (2015) Offensive line coach & run game coordinator; Arizona State (2017) Consultant; Arizona State (2018–2020) Offensive line coach; Panthers Wrocław (2022–2024) Head coach

Awards and highlights
- MW Coach of the Year (2011)

Head coaching record
- Regular season: 27–35 (.435)
- Postseason: 1–1 (.500) (bowls)
- Career: 27–35 (.435)

David Joe Christensen (born January 17, 1961) is an American football coach and former player. He was assistant coach at Arizona State. He previously worked as the offensive line coach and run-game coordinator for the Texas A&M Aggies. He previously served as the offensive coordinator for the University of Utah. He was previously the head coach at the University of Wyoming from 2009 to 2013, where he compiled a record of 27 wins and 35 losses (.435). Prior to Wyoming, Christensen was the offensive coordinator for the University of Missouri and the University of Toledo.

== Early life ==
A native of Everett, Washington, Christensen attended the University of Washington in Seattle, where he played under head coach Don James on the Huskies football team from 1980 to 1982. He earned a B.A. degree in sociology from Western Washington University in 1985 and a M.S. degree in sports science from Eastern Washington University in 1988.

== Coaching career ==
Christensen was formerly the assistant head coach and offensive coordinator for the University of Missouri. He served as an offensive assistant under Gary Pinkel for 19 years, including the last 16 as his offensive coordinator. He first joined Pinkel at the University of Toledo in 1990 as offensive line coach, and was promoted to offensive coordinator in 1992. Pinkel left for Missouri in 2001, and brought Christensen along as his offensive coordinator. From 2005 to 2008, Christensen employed a passing-oriented version of the no-huddle spread offense.

In the 2007 season, Christensen's offense used this scheme to good effect by scoring a school record 558 points. Additionally, Missouri ranked fifth in total offensive yards (490.29 per game), eighth in scoring offense (39.86 points per game), and ninth in passing yards (314.07 per game). The same season propelled Chase Daniel to Heisman finalist status. Martin Rucker and Jeremy Maclin were named consensus All-Americans, making it the first time two Tigers were named as such in the same season. Christensen himself was a finalist for the Broyles Award and Rivals.com named him as the Offensive Coordinator of the Year.

Christensen's name had been mentioned with respect to the head coaching position of several ailing programs, namely, New Mexico, Washington, Washington State, and Wyoming. He ultimately accepted the head coaching job at Wyoming. Christensen led the Cowboys to a 2009 New Mexico Bowl win in 2009 against the Fresno State.

On October 13, 2012; Christensen confronted Air Force coach Troy Calhoun after the Cowboys' narrow 28–27 loss to the Falcons. Believing Calhoun had told Air Force quarterback Connor Dietz to fake an injury in order to buy more time before the game-winning touchdown, Christensen launched a profanity-laced tirade at Calhoun, calling him a "fly boy." Christensen apologized the next night and was reprimanded by the Mountain West Conference for his actions. On October 22, Wyoming athletic director Tom Burman suspended Christensen for the Cowboys' game against Boise State and fined him $50,000. Assistant head coach Pete Kaligis coached the team in that game.

On December 21, 2020, Christensen announced his retirement from college coaching after 38 years.

On November 18, 2022, it was announced Christensen would take over as head coach for Panthers Wrocław in the European League of Football. On July 4, 2024, Christensen was fired by Panthers midway through the season with 2-4 record.

== Head coaching record ==
=== College ===
Year	Team	Overall	Conference	Standing	Bowl/playoffs
Wyoming Cowboys (Mountain West Conference) (2009–2013)
2009	Wyoming	7–6	4–4	5th	W New Mexico
2010	Wyoming	3–9	1–7	T–8th	
2011	Wyoming	8–5	5–2	3rd	L New Mexico
2012	Wyoming	4–8	3–5	T–6th	
2013	Wyoming	5–7	3–5	4th (Mountain)	
Wyoming:		27–35	16–23		
Total:		27–35			
