= Asher Clark =

American football player (born 1990)

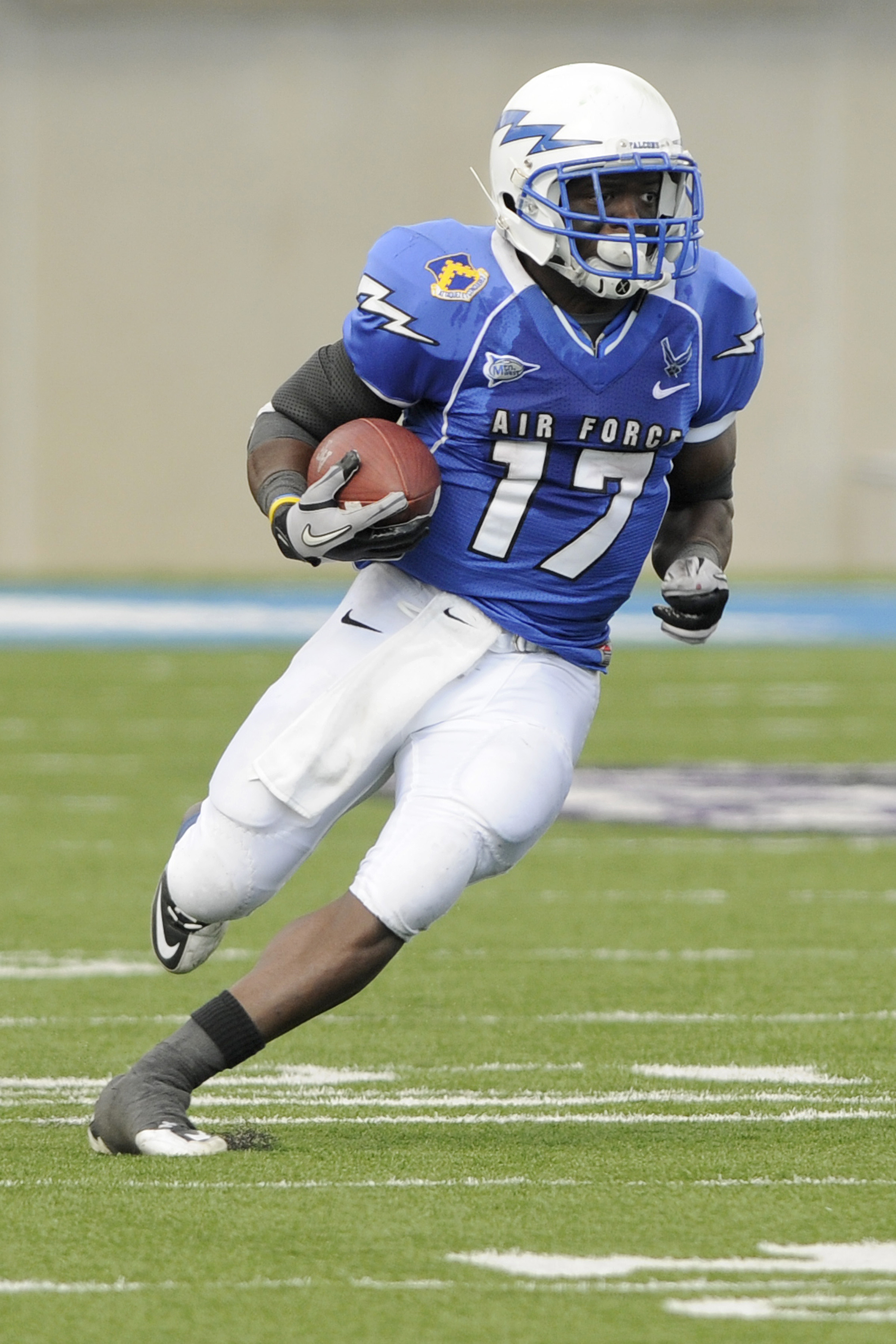
- Clark with the Air Force in 2010

No. 17
- Position: Running back

Personal information
- Born: February 11, 1990 (age 36); Lawrenceville, Georgia
- Listed height: 5 ft 8 in (1.73 m)
- Listed weight: 190 lb (86 kg)

Career information
- High school: Peachtree Ridge (Suwanee, Georgia)
- College: Air Force (2008–2011)

Awards and highlights
- 2× Second-team All-MWC (2010, 2011)
- Stats at ESPN

Asher Clark (born February 11, 1990) is an American former college football running back for the Air Force Academy football program.

Clark was born and raised in Lawrenceville, Georgia, in 1990. In January 2008, he committed to the United States Air Force Academy after receiving a football scholarship. He had been a quarterback in high school and was converted to a tailback at Air Force. He gained 588 rushing yards as a freshman in 2008, 865 yards as a sophomore in 2009, and 1,031 yards as a junior in 2010. During the 2011 season, Clark totaled 1,110 rushing yards on 163 carries for an average of 6.8 yards per carry.

By the end of the 2011 season, Clark ranked as the second leading rusher in Air Force Academy history. He was removed from the Air Force Academy in May 2012, for illegal drug use, less than one week before he was due to graduate.
