= 2011 San Diego State Aztecs football team =

American college football season

2011 San Diego State Aztecs football
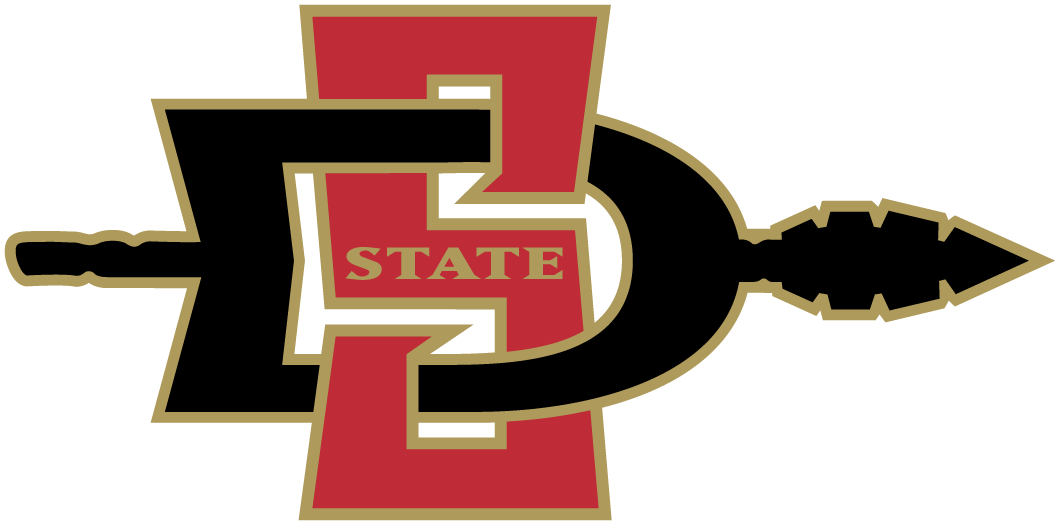

New Orleans Bowl, L 30–32 vs. Louisiana–Lafayette
- Conference: Mountain West Conference
- Record: 8–5 (4–3 MW)
- Head coach: Rocky Long (1st season)
- Offensive coordinator: Andy Ludwig (1st season)
- Offensive scheme: Pro-style
- Base defense: 3–3–5
- Home stadium: Qualcomm Stadium

2011 Mountain West Conference football standings
	Conf.			Overall
Team	W		L	W		L
No. 14 TCU $	7	–	0	11	–	2
No. 8 Boise State	6	–	1	12	–	1
Wyoming	5	–	2	8	–	5
San Diego State	4	–	3	8	–	5
Air Force	3	–	4	7	–	6
Colorado State	1	–	6	3	–	9
UNLV	1	–	6	2	–	10
New Mexico	1	–	6	1	–	11
$ – Conference champion; Rankings from AP Poll

The 2011 San Diego State Aztecs football team represented San Diego State University in the 2011 NCAA Division I FBS football season. The Aztecs were led by first-year head coach Rocky Long and played their home games at Qualcomm Stadium. They are members of the Mountain West Conference. They finished the season 8-5, 4–3 in Mountain West play to finish fourth place. They were invited to the New Orleans Bowl where they lost, but then eventually won a forfeited game to Louisiana–Lafayette.

== Schedule ==
Date	Time	Opponent	Site	TV	Result	Attendance
September 3	7:00 p.m.	Cal Poly*	Qualcomm Stadium; San Diego, CA	Mtn.	W 49–21	34,384
September 10	9:00 a.m.	at Army*	Michie Stadium; West Point, NY	CBSSN	W 23–20	26,778
September 17	3:00 p.m.	Washington State*	Qualcomm Stadium; San Diego, CA	Mtn.	W 42–24	57,286
September 24	9:00 a.m.	at No. 22 Michigan*	Michigan Stadium; Ann Arbor, MI	BTN	L 7–28	110,707
October 8	7:30 p.m.	TCU^{†}	Qualcomm Stadium; San Diego, CA	CBSSN	L 14–27	44,248
October 13	5:00 p.m.	at Air Force	Falcon Stadium; Colorado Springs, CO	CBSSN	W 41–27	27,490
October 29	7:00 p.m.	Wyoming	Qualcomm Stadium; San Diego, CA	Mtn.	L 27–30	29,730
November 5	5:00 p.m.	New Mexico	Qualcomm Stadium; San Diego, CA	Mtn.	W 35–7	28,362
November 12	3:00 p.m.	at Colorado State	Hughes Stadium; Fort Collins, CO	Mtn.	W 18–15	16,811
November 19	5:00 p.m.	No. 10 Boise State	Qualcomm Stadium; San Diego, CA	CBSSN	L 35–52	52,256
November 26	7:00 p.m.	at UNLV	Sam Boyd Stadium; Whitney, NV	Mtn.	W 31–14	19,075
December 3	5:00 p.m.	Fresno State*	Qualcomm Stadium; San Diego, CA (rivalry)	CBSSN	W 35–28	32,790
December 17	6:00 p.m.	vs. Louisiana–Lafayette*	Mercedes-Benz Superdome; New Orleans, LA (New Orleans Bowl)	ESPN	L 30–32	42,841
*Non-conference game; ^{†}Homecoming; Rankings from AP Poll released prior to the game; All times are in Pacific time
