= Greg McCoy =

American football player (born 1988)

No. 39,30
- Position: Cornerback

Personal information
- Born: September 8, 1988 (age 38); Dallas, Texas, U.S.
- Listed height: 5 ft 10 in (1.78 m)
- Listed weight: 181 lb (82 kg)

Career information
- College: TCU
- NFL draft: 2012: 7th round, 220th overall pick

Career history
- Chicago Bears (2012)*; Arizona Cardinals (2012)*; Minnesota Vikings (2013)*
- * Offseason or practice squad member only

Awards and highlights
- MW Special Teams Player of the Year (2011); First-team All-MW (2011)
- Stats at Pro Football Reference

Greg McCoy (born September 8, 1988) is an American former professional football cornerback. He was selected by the Chicago Bears in the seventh round of the 2012 NFL draft. McCoy has also played for the Arizona Cardinals. McCoy played college football at TCU.

== College career ==
During his time with the TCU Horned Frogs, he recorded 92 tackles, seven interceptions and 17 pass breakups in 51 career games. McCoy also returned kickoffs, averaging 28.9 yards with three touchdowns on 52 returns. McCoy was named Mountain West Conference special teams player of the year in his final season after averaging 30.6 yards with two TDs on 37 kickoff returns. His two scores came on returns of 99 yards against UNLV and 94 yards versus UL Monroe. McCoy is a member of Kappa Alpha Psi fraternity.

== Professional career ==
McCoy was selected in the seventh round, 220th overall by the Chicago Bears in the 2012 NFL draft. NFL.com analyst Bucky Brooks stated that McCoy "is a competitive corner with a scrappy demeanor", and that he "will join a competitive battle in Chicago".

On May 8, the Bears signed McCoy to a four-year contract. He was waived on August 31.

On September 11, 2012, the Cardinals signed McCoy to their practice squad.

On January 9, 2013, the Vikings signed McCoy. McCoy was released by the Vikings on August 26, 2013 (along with 12 others) to get to a 75-man roster.
