= List of San Jose State Spartans football seasons =

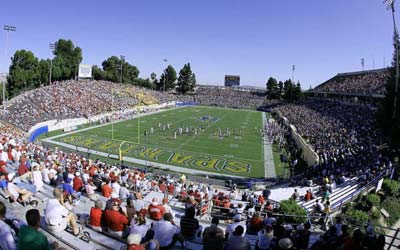
Spartan Stadium, where the Spartans have played since 1933.

This is a list of seasons completed by the San Jose State Spartans football team of the National Collegiate Athletic Association (NCAA) Division I Football Bowl Subdivision (FBS). The team began competition in 1892.

Originally an independent, San Jose State first joined a conference in 1922 when it joined the California Coast Conference. That conference only lasted three years, so the team became independent again in 1925. They joined the Far Western Conference in 1929. San Jose State became independent for the third time in 1935, before becoming a charter member of the California Collegiate Athletic Association in 1939. When the NCAA first started classification in 1937, San Jose State was part of the NCAA College Division (Small College). They became independent for the fourth time in 1950, also moving to the NCAA University Division (Major College) that year. They stayed independent until becoming a charter member of the Pacific Coast Athletic Association (PCAA) in 1969. The conference was renamed the Big West Conference in 1988. San Jose State later moved to the Western Athletic Conference (WAC) in 1996 and Mountain West Conference (MW) in 2013.

== Seasons ==
Year	Coach	Overall	Conference	Standing	Bowl/playoffs	Coaches^{#}	AP^{°}
Independent (1892–1921)
1892	Unknown	0–1–0					
James E. Addicott (Independent) (1893–1900)
1893	Addicott	0–2–0					
1894	No team						
1895	Addicott	0–0–1					
1896	No team						
1897	No team						
1898	Addicott	4–1–1					
1899	Jess Woods	5–2–1					
1900	Addicott; Fielding H. Yost	3–3–1					
No team (1901–1920)
David Wooster (Independent) (1921)
1921	Wooster	1–5–0					
California Coast Conference (1922–1924)
David Wooster (California Coast Conference) (1922)
1922	Wooster	2–5–1					
H.C. McDonald (California Coast Conference) (1923)
1923	McDonald	0–6–0					
Ernesto R. Knollin (California Coast Conference) (1924)
1924	Knollin	1–4–0					
Independent (1925–1928)
Ernesto R. Knollin (Independent) (1925–1928)
1925	Knollin	2–5–0					
1926	Knollin	1–6–1					
1927	Knollin	4–5–0					
1928	Knollin	5–2–1					
Far Western Conference (1929–1934)
Walter Crawford (Far Western Conference) (1929–1931)
1929	Crawford	3–3–1					
1930	Crawford	2–3–3					
1931	Crawford	1–7–0					
Dudley DeGroot (Far Western Conference/Independent/California Collegiate Athletic Association) (1932–1939)
1932	DeGroot	7–0–2					
1933	DeGroot	5–4–0					
1934	DeGroot	3–3–4					
Independent (1935–1938)
1935	DeGroot	5–5–1					
1936	DeGroot	5–4–0					
1937	DeGroot	11–2–1					
1938	DeGroot	11–1–0					
California Collegiate Athletic Association (1939–1949)
1939	DeGroot	13–0–0	5–0–0	1st			
Ben Winkelman (California Collegiate Athletic Association) (1940–1941)
1940	Winkelman	11–1–0	3–0–0	1st			
1941	Winkelman	5–3–3	2–0–1	T–1st			
Glenn Hartranft (Independent) (1942)
1942	Hartranft	7–2–0					
No team (World War II) (1943–1945)
Bill Hubbard (California Collegiate Athletic Association) (1946–1949)
1946	Hubbard	9–1–1	4–6–0	1st			
1947	Hubbard	9–3–0	3–2–0	2nd			
1948	Hubbard	9–3–0	5–0–0	1st			
1949	Hubbard	9–4–0	4–0–0	1st			
Independent (1950–1968)
Robert T. Bronzan (Independent) (1950–1956)
1950	Bronzan	6–3–1					
1951	Bronzan	2–7–1					
1952	Bronzan	6–3–0					
1953	Bronzan	4–4–1					
1954	Bronzan	7–3–0					
1955	Bronzan	5–3–1					
1956	Bronzan	2–7–1					
Bob Titchenal (Independent) (1957–1964)
1957	Titchenal	3–7–0					
1958	Titchenal	4–5–0					
1959	Titchenal	4–6–0					
1960	Titchenal	5–4–0					
1961	Titchenal	6–4–0					
1962	Titchenal	2–8–1					
1963	Titchenal	5–5–0					
1964	Titchenal	4–6–0					
Harry Anderson (Independent) (1965–1968)
1965	Anderson	5–5–0					
1966	Anderson	3–7–0					
1967	Anderson	2–7–0					
1968	Anderson	3–7–0					
Pacific Coast Athletic Association/Big West Conference (1969–1995)
Joe McMullen (Pacific Coast Athletic Association) (1969–1970)
1969	McMullen	2–8–0	1–1–0	4th			
1970	McMullen; Dewey King	2–9–0	2–3–0	T–4th			
Dewey King (Pacific Coast Athletic Association) (1971–1972)
1971	King	5–6–1	4–1–0	2nd	L Pasadena		
1972	King	4–7–0	1–3–0	T–3rd			
Darryl Rogers (Pacific Coast Athletic Association) (1973–1975)
1973	Rogers	5–4–2	2–0–2	2nd			
1974	Rogers	8–3–1	2–2–0	T–2nd			
1975	Rogers	9–2–0	5–0–0	1st			
Lynn Stiles (Pacific Coast Athletic Association) (1976–1978)
1976	Stiles	7–4–0	4–0–0	1st			
1977	Stiles	4–7–0	2–2–0	3rd			
1978	Stiles	7–5–0	4–1–0	1st			
Jack Elway (Pacific Coast Athletic Association) (1979–1983)
1979	Elway	6–5–1^{[Note A]}	4–0–1^{[Note A]}	T–1st			
1980	Elway	7–4–0	3–2–0	3rd			
1981	Elway	9–3–0	5–0–0	1st	L California		
1982	Elway	8–3–0	4–2–0	3rd			
1983	Elway	5–6–0	3–3–0	T–3rd			
Claude Gilbert (Pacific Coast Athletic Association/Big West Conference) (1984–1989)
1984	Gilbert	6–5–0^{[Note B]}	5–2–0^{[Note B]}	3rd			
1985	Gilbert	2–8–1	2–4–1	6th			
1986	Gilbert	10–2–0	7–0–0	1st	W California		
1987	Gilbert	10–2–0	7–0–0	1st	L California		
1988	Gilbert	4–8–0	4–3–0	T–3rd			
1989	Gilbert	6–5–0	5–2–0	T–2nd			
Terry Shea (Big West Conference) (1990–1991)
1990	Shea	9–2–1	7–0–0	1st	W California Raisin	20	
1991	Shea	6–4–1	6–1–0	T–1st			
Ron Turner (Big West Conference) (1992)
1992	Turner	7–4–0	4–2–0	T–2nd			
John Ralston (Big West Conference/Western Athletic Conference) (1993–1996)
1993	Ralston	2–9–0	2–4–0	T–8th			
1994	Ralston	3–8–0	3–3–0	T–6th			
1995	Ralston	3–8–0	3–4–0	T–6th			
Western Athletic Conference (1996–2012)
1996	Ralston	3–9	3–5	T–5th Pacific			
Dave Baldwin (Western Athletic Conference) (1997–2000)
1997	Baldwin	4–7	4–4	T–4th Pacific			
1998	Baldwin	4–8	3–5	T–5th Pacific			
1999	Baldwin	3–7	1–5	7th			
2000	Baldwin	7–5	5–3	4th			
Fitz Hill (Western Athletic Conference) (2001–2004)
2001	Hill	3–9	3–5	8th			
2002	Hill	6–7	4–4	4th			
2003	Hill	3–8	2–6	8th			
2004	Hill	2–9	1–7	10th			
Dick Tomey (Western Athletic Conference) (2005–2009)
2005	Tomey	3–8	2–6	T–6th			
2006	Tomey	9–4	5–3	3rd	W New Mexico		
2007	Tomey	5–7	4–4	T–6th			
2008	Tomey	6–6	4–4	T–6th			
2009	Tomey	2–10	1–7	T–9th			
Mike MacIntyre (Western Athletic Conference) (2010–2012)
2010	MacIntyre	1–12	0–8	9th			
2011	MacIntyre	5–7	3–4	T–4th			
2012	MacIntyre; Kent Baer	11–2	5–1	2nd	W Military	21	21
Mountain West Conference (2013–present)
Ron Caragher (Mountain West Conference) (2013–2016)
2013	Caragher	6–6	5–3	4th West			
2014	Caragher	3–9	2–6	5th West			
2015	Caragher	6–7	4–4	T–2nd West	W Cure		
2016	Caragher	4–8	3–5	T–4th West			
Brent Brennan (Mountain West Conference) (2017–2023)
2017	Brennan	2–11	1–8	T–5th West			
2018	Brennan	1–11	1–7	6th West			
2019	Brennan	5–7	2–6	4th West			
2020	Brennan	7–1	7–0	1st	L Arizona	24	24
2021	Brennan	5–7	3–5	5th West			
2022	Brennan	7–5	5–3	3rd West	L Famous Idaho Potato		
2023	Brennan	7–6	6–2	T–2nd	L Hawaii		
Ken Niumatalolo (Mountain West Conference) (2024–present)
2024	Niumatalolo	7–6	3–4	T–5th	L Hawaii		
2025	Niumatalolo	3–9	2–6	T–9th			
Total:		528–554–38					
National championship Conference title Conference division title or championship game berth
^{†}Indicates Bowl Coalition, Bowl Alliance, BCS, or CFP / New Years' Six bowl.; ^{#}Rankings from final Coaches Poll.; ^{°}Rankings from final AP Poll.

== Notes ==
^A San Jose State forfeited 3 wins and 1 tie, including two PCAA conference wins, for using an ineligible player. This made San Jose State's adjusted record for 1979 3–8 overall (2–2 PCAA).
^B The PCAA adjusted San Jose State's 1984 record to 7–4 overall (6–1 PCAA) after UNLV forfeited all 11 of its wins for 1984.
