= 2012 San Jose State Spartans football team =

American college football season

2012 San Jose State Spartans football

Military Bowl champion

Military Bowl, W 29–20 vs. Bowling Green
- Conference: Western Athletic Conference

Ranking
- Coaches: No. 21
- AP: No. 21
- Record: 11–2 (5–1 WAC)
- Head coach: Mike MacIntyre (3rd season; regular season); Kent Baer (interim; bowl game)
- Offensive coordinator: Brian Lindgren (1st season)
- Offensive scheme: Multiple
- Defensive coordinator: Kent Baer (3rd season)
- Base defense: 4–3
- Home stadium: Spartan Stadium

2012 Western Athletic Conference football standings
	Conf.			Overall
Team	W		L	W		L
No. 16 Utah State $	6	–	0	11	–	2
No. 21 San Jose State	5	–	1	11	–	2
Louisiana Tech	4	–	2	9	–	3
UTSA *	3	–	3	8	–	4
Texas State *	2	–	4	4	–	8
Idaho	1	–	5	1	–	11
New Mexico State	0	–	6	1	–	11
$ – Conference champion; * Texas State and UTSA were not eligible for conference title or bowl games as part of their transition to the FBS.; Rankings from AP Poll

The 2012 San Jose State Spartans football team represented San Jose State University in the 2012 NCAA Division I FBS football season. The Spartans were led by third year head coach Mike MacIntyre and played their home games at Spartan Stadium. They were members of the Western Athletic Conference. This was the Spartans' final season as members of the WAC. They joined the Mountain West Conference on July 1, 2013. They finished the season 11–2, 5–1 in WAC play to finish in second place. They were invited to the Military Bowl where they defeated Bowling Green.

Head coach Mike MacIntyre resigned at the end of the regular season to take the head coach position at Colorado. Defensive coordinator Kent Baer was the Spartans' interim head coach for the Military Bowl. San Diego head coach Ron Caragher was hired as the Spartans new head coach beginning in 2013.

== Schedule ==
The 2012 schedule was officially released on March 5, 2012. The schedule had six home games and six road games. Because the WAC had only seven football member schools by 2012 due to conference realignment, San Jose State played six conference games and six non-conference games for the season. San Jose State played against all six other WAC member schools: Idaho, Louisiana Tech, New Mexico State, Texas State, UTSA, and Utah State. The non-conference games were against: Colorado State and San Diego State of the Mountain West Conference, Stanford of the Pac-12 Conference, UC Davis of the Big Sky Conference, and FBS independent schools BYU and Navy.

On November 3, San Jose State became bowl eligible for the first time since 2008 after beating Idaho and attaining six wins against FBS schools. However, the win over UTSA did not count, because UTSA was not yet a full FBS member school.

Six games were nationally televised this season. ESPN showed the Military Bowl on December 27, ESPN2 showed the games against BYU and Louisiana Tech, CBS Sports Network showed the game against Navy, and Pac-12 Network showed the game against Stanford. WatchESPN also streamed the games shown on ESPN and ESPN2 as well as two games—the ones against Colorado State and UTSA—broadcast by ESPN3, the game against New Mexico State via New Mexico State's AggieVision network, and the game against Utah State via ESPN Regional Television.

KLIV in San Jose served as the flagship station for the San Jose State Spartans Football Radio Network, along with fellow affiliates KION in Salinas and newcomer KFIV in Modesto. Michael Spero returned for his second season as play-by-play announcer, with Kevin Richardson at color commentary.

Date	Time	Opponent	Rank	Site	TV	Result	Attendance
August 31	7:00 pm	at No. 21 Stanford*		Stanford Stadium; Stanford, CA (Bill Walsh Legacy Game)	P12N	L 17–20	40,577
September 8	5:00 pm	UC Davis*		Spartan Stadium; San Jose, CA		W 45–13	7,462
September 15	5:00 pm	Colorado State*		Spartan Stadium; San Jose, CA	ESPN3	W 40–20	7,189
September 22	5:00 pm	at San Diego State*		Qualcomm Stadium; San Diego, CA	KUSI	W 38–34	24,103
September 29	12:30 pm	at Navy*		Navy–Marine Corps Memorial Stadium; Annapolis, MD	CBSSN	W 12–0	32,375
October 13	1:00 pm	Utah State^{†}		Spartan Stadium; San Jose, CA	ESPN+, ESPN3	L 27–49	15,168
October 20	11:00 am	at UTSA		Alamodome; San Antonio, TX	ESPN3	W 52–24	30,862
October 27	1:00 pm	Texas State		Spartan Stadium; San Jose, CA		W 31–20	7,093
November 3	2:00 pm	at Idaho		Kibbie Dome; Moscow, ID	KTRV	W 42–13	14,429
November 10	1:30 pm	at New Mexico State		Aggie Memorial Stadium; Las Cruces, NM	AggieVision, Altitude, ESPN3	W 47–7	9,121
November 17	7:30 pm	BYU*		Spartan Stadium; San Jose, CA	ESPN2	W 20–14	15,494
November 24	7:30 pm	Louisiana Tech		Spartan Stadium; San Jose, CA	ESPN2	W 52–43	12,326
December 27	12:00 pm	vs. Bowling Green*	No. 24	RFK Stadium; Washington D.C. (Military Bowl)	ESPN	W 29–20	17,835
*Non-conference game; ^{†}Homecoming; Rankings from AP Poll released prior to the game; All times are in Pacific time

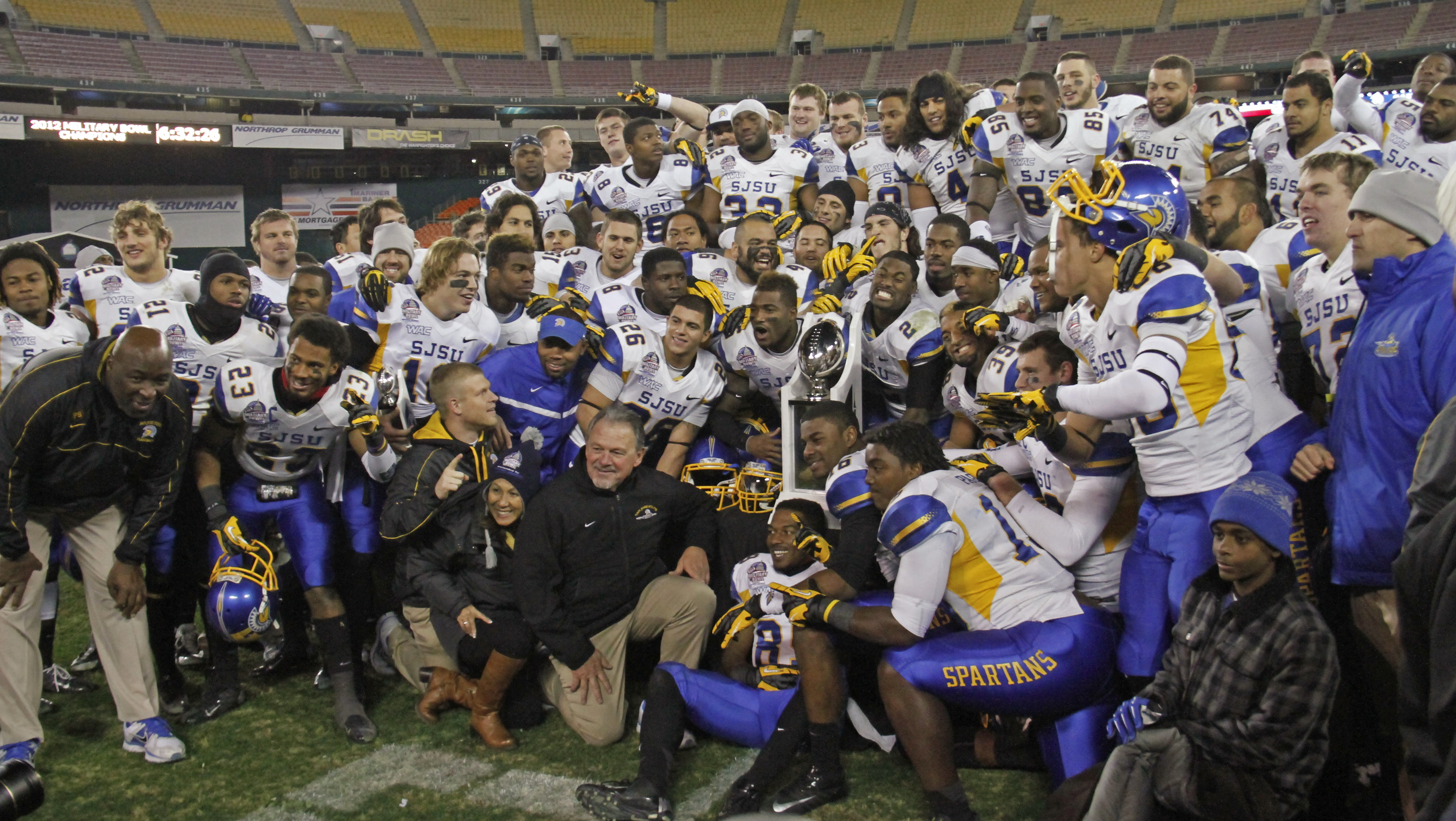
The Spartans pose with the trophy at the 2012 Military Bowl

== Game summaries ==
=== At Stanford ===
	1	2	3	4	Total
Spartans	0	3	14	0	17
No. 18 Cardinal	14	3	0	3	20

Scoring for Stanford: S. Taylor 1-yard run, J. Nunes' 11-yard pass to D. Terrell, J. Williamson 46-yard and 20-yard field goal. Scoring for San Jose State: Austin Lopez 38-yard field goal, Blake Jurich 3-yard run, and David Fales' 21-yard pass to Noel Grigsby.

=== UC Davis ===
	1	2	3	4	Total
Aggies	7	0	0	6	13
Spartans	0	14	21	10	45

=== Colorado State ===
	1	2	3	4	Total
Rams	0	13	0	7	20
Spartans	14	3	7	16	40

=== At San Diego State ===
	1	2	3	4	Total
Spartans	3	14	0	21	38
Aztecs	0	17	7	10	34

=== At Navy ===
	1	2	3	4	Total
Spartans	3	3	0	6	12
Midshipmen	0	0	0	0	0

=== Utah State ===
	1	2	3	4	Total
Aggies	14	14	14	7	49
Spartans	3	17	7	0	27

In San Jose State's homecoming game, San Jose State lost to eventual WAC champion Utah State. Although David Fales completed 38 of 50 passes for 467 yards and three touchdowns, Fales was sacked 13 times with a cumulative loss of 102 yards. Utah State also had a 212–4 advantage in rushing yards.

=== At UTSA ===
	1	2	3	4	Total
Spartans	28	10	14	0	52
Roadrunners	0	10	7	7	24

=== Texas State ===
	1	2	3	4	Total
Bobcats	7	13	0	0	20
Spartans	3	14	14	0	31

=== At Idaho ===
	1	2	3	4	Total
Spartans	0	14	14	14	42
Vandals	7	0	6	0	13

=== At New Mexico State ===
	1	2	3	4	Total
Spartans	17	20	10	0	47
Aggies	0	0	0	7	7

=== BYU ===
	1	2	3	4	Total
Cougars	7	0	0	7	14
Spartans	13	7	0	0	20

=== Louisiana Tech ===
	1	2	3	4	Total
Bulldogs	6	21	10	6	43
Spartans	10	14	14	14	52

=== Bowling Green–Military Bowl ===
	1	2	3	4	Total
No. 24 Spartans	7	3	9	10	29
Falcons	3	3	7	7	20

== Ranking movements ==
On November 25, San Jose State made the No. 24 spot in the Bowl Championship Series (BCS) Top 25 rankings. This was San Jose State's first-ever BCS ranking and first national ranking since 1990. The following week, both the AP Poll and Coaches' Poll ranked San Jose State No. 24. This ranking marked San Jose State's first top-25 AP ranking since 1975. San Jose State also played its first bowl game since the 2006 New Mexico Bowl. On December 27, San Jose State defeated Bowling Green in the 2012 Military Bowl at Washington, D. C. by the score of 29–20. For the first time in school history, San Jose State made it into the final rankings in both the AP and USA Today Coaches Polls, earning a No. 21 ranking in both.

Ranking movements Legend: ██ Increase in ranking ██ Decrease in ranking — = Not ranked RV = Received votes
	Week															
Poll	Pre	1	2	3	4	5	6	7	8	9	10	11	12	13	14	Final
AP	—	—	—	—	—	—	—	—	—	—	—	RV	RV	RV	24	21
Coaches'	—	—	—	—	—	—	—	—	—	—	—	—	RV	RV	24	21
BCS	Not released							—	—	—	—	—	—	25	24	Not released

== Personnel ==
=== Coaching staff ===
Head coach Mike MacIntyre returned for his third season with San Jose State. Under MacIntyre, San Jose State went 1–12 in its 2010 season and improved to 5–7 in 2011.

On December 10, the University of Colorado at Boulder hired MacIntyre to be the new head coach of the Colorado Buffaloes football team. With a five-year, $10 million contract, MacIntyre would annually earn nearly quadruple his annual salary at San Jose State. The following day, San Jose State named defensive coordinator Kent Baer to be interim coach for the 2012 Military Bowl on December 27, in which they defeated Bowling Green 29–20. The previous week, MacIntyre stated that although other schools had contacted him about potential job openings, MacIntyre was not actively seeking another job. During San Jose State's late-season win streak, speculation occurred that MacIntyre might become head coach at Cal or Kentucky in 2013.

Name	Position	Seasons at San Jose State	Alma mater
Mike MacIntyre	Head coach	3	Georgia Tech (1989)
Klayton Adams	Tight ends	2	Boise State (2005)
Kent Baer	Defensive coordinator, linebackers, interim head coach	5	Utah State (1973)
Gary Bernardi	Offensive line	3	Cal State Northridge (1976)
Charles Clark	Defensive backs	3	Mississippi (2007)
Fred Guidici	Special teams, running backs	1	San Jose State (1989)
Jim Jeffcoat	Defensive line	2	Arizona State (1982)
Andy LaRussa	Cornerbacks, special teams	2	Southern Utah (2002)
Brian Lindgren	Offensive coordinator, quarterbacks	1	Idaho (2004)
Terry Malley	Receivers, recruiting coordinator	4	Santa Clara (1976)

=== Departing starters ===
San Jose State lost 12 starters from the 2011 season, including quarterback Matt Faulkner, running back Brandon Rutley, safety Duke Ihenacho, and placekicker Jens Alvernik. Ihenacho went on to play for the NFL's Denver Broncos as an undrafted free agent.

=== Returning starters ===
==== Offense ====
Player	Class	Position
Noel Grigsby	Junior	Wide receiver
Chandler Jones	Junior	Wide receiver
Jabari Carr	Sophomore	Wide receiver
David Quessenberry	Senior	Offensive tackle
Nicholas Kaspar	Junior	Offensive tackle
Ryan Otten	Senior	Tight end
Peter Tuitupou	Senior	Tight end

==== Defense ====
Player	Class	Position
Travis Raciti	Sophomore	Defensive tackle
Travis Johnson	Senior	Defensive end
Keith Smith	Junior	Linebacker
Ronnie Yell	Senior	Cornerback
James Orth	Senior	Safety

==== Special teams ====
Player	Class	Position
Harrison Waid	Junior	Punter/placekicker

=== Depth chart ===
Starters and backups from the final depth chart:

Defense

FS
James Orth
Simon Connette
⋅

WLB	MLB	SLB
Keith Smith	Vince Buhagiar	Hector Roach
Josh Fasavalu	Tony Zizzo	Doug Parrish
⋅	⋅	⋅

SS
Cullen Newsome
Travis Talianko
⋅

CB
Ronnie Yell
Bené Benwikere
⋅

DE	DT	DT	DE
Travis Johnson	Travis Raciti	Anthony Larceval	David Tuitupou
Sean Bacon	Foloi Vae	David Catalano	Vincent Abbott
⋅	Marcus Howard	⋅	Tony Popovich

CB
Bené Benwikere
Jimmy Pruitt
Damon Ogburn, Jr. or Forrest Hightower

Offense

WR
Jabari Carr
Kyle Nunn
⋅

LT	LG	C	RG	RT
David Quessenberry	Ryan Jones	Reuben Hasani	Nicholas Kaspar	Jon Meyer
Amar Pal	Jeff Grattan	David Peterson	Nick Diaz	Wes Schweitzer
⋅	Doug Blacksill	⋅	⋅	⋅

TE
Ryan Otten
Peter Tuitupou
Travis Lorius or Dasmen Stewart

WR
Noel Grigsby
Chandler Jones
Sean Linton

QB
David Fales
Blake Jurich
Joe Gray

RB
De'Leon Eskridge
Tyler Ervin
Jason Simpson

FB
Ina Liaina
Ray Rodriguez
⋅

Special teams
PK Austin Lopez
PK Alex Anastasi
P Harrison Waid
P Ryan Harper
KR Forrest Hightower
PR Ronnie Yell
LS Ryan DiSalvo
H Daniel Bradbury

=== Final roster ===
2012 San Jose State Spartans final roster
Quarterbacks: 10 David Fales – (redshirt) Junior; 16 Joe Gray – (redshirt) Freshman; 13 Jason Habash – Freshman; 14 Blake Jurich – Sophomore; Running backs: 30 Josh Brown – Senior; 2 De'Leon Eskridge – Senior; 20 David Freeman – (redshirt) Senior; 40 Jarrod Lawson – Freshman; 42 Ina Liaina – (redshirt) Senior; 8 Jalynn McCain – Freshman; 46 Ray Rodriguez – Junior; 24 Cedric Simmons – Freshman; 32 Jason Simpson – (redshirt) Junior; 27 Ben Thompson – (redshirt) Sophomore; Wide receivers: 17 Daniel Bradbury – (redshirt) Freshman; 1 Jabari Carr – Junior; 23 Noel Grigsby – (redshirt) Junior; 89 Chandler Jones – (redshirt) Junior; 20 Chris Kearney – (redshirt) Freshman; 84 Sean Linton – (redshirt) Sophomore; 86 K.C. Pearce – (redshirt) Freshman; 19 Kyle Nunn – Junior; 35 Hansell Wilson – Freshman; 81 Jake Wilson – Freshman; Tight ends: 85 Keenan Brown – (redshirt) Senior; 38 Billy Freeman – Freshman; 88 Travis Lorius – (redshirt) Senior; 80 Max Miller – (redshirt) Junior; 82 Ryan Otten – (redshirt) Senior; 18 Dasmen Stewart – Junior; 83 Jordan Thiel – Freshman; 37 Sam Tomlitz – (redshirt) Sophomore; 15 Peter Tuitupou – Senior	Offensive linemen: 78 Oscar Barron – G – Freshman; 71 Keith Bendixen – RG – (redshirt) Sophomore; 56 Doug Blacksill – LG – Freshman; 50 Nick Diaz – RG/C – Freshman; 54 Reuben Hasani – C – (redshirt) Junior; 74 Ryan Jones – LG – (redshirt) Junior; 75 Nicholas Kaspar – RG – Junior; 79 Jon Meyer – T – (redshirt) Junior; 64 Nick Oreglia – Freshman; 61 Amar Pal – LT – (redshirt) Junior; 51 David Peterson – C – (redshirt) Sophomore; 76 David Quessenberry – LT – (redshirt) Senior; 77 Evan Sarver – OT – Freshman; 72 Wes Schweitzer – RT – Freshman; 60 Michael Talafus – Freshman; Defensive linemen: 53 Vincent Abbott – LDE – (redshirt) Senior; 95 Sean Bacon – RDE – Sophomore; 85 Keenan Brown – DE – (redshirt) Junior; 92 David Catalano – LDT – (redshirt) Freshman; 57 Nate Falo – DT – (redshirt) Freshman; 86 Christian Hill – DE – (redshirt) Freshman; 96 Marcus Howard – RDT – Sophomore; 43 Travis Johnson – RDE – Senior; 97 Anthony Larceval – LDT – (redshirt) Junior; 45 Lemaki Musika – DE – Freshman; 91 Joe Nigos – RDT – (redshirt) Senior; 98 Tony Popovich – LDE – (redshirt) Freshman; 90 Travis Raciti – RDT – Sophomore; 49 Shane Smith – LB – Freshman; 94 Eugene Taylor – DE – Freshman; 41 David Tuitupou – LDE – (redshirt) Senior; 93 Foloi Vae – RDT – (redshirt) Sophomore	Linebackers: 99 Nick Brown – Freshman; 36 Vince Buhagiar – OLB – Junior; 11 Josh Fasavalu – (redshirt) Freshman; 33 Brad Kuh – Freshman; 55 Ryan McAleenan – Freshman; 34 Derek Muaava – (redshirt) Sophomore; 15 Doug Parrish – (redshirt) Sophomore; 22 Hector Roach – Freshman; 31 Keith Smith – ILB – Junior; 4 Christian Tago – Freshman; 94 Eugene Taylor – Freshman; 44 Tony Zizzo – Junior; Defensive backs: 21 Bené Benwikere – LCB – Sophomore; 28 Simon Connette – FS – (redshirt) Freshman; 13 Tim Crawley – DB – Freshman; 7 Tyler Ervin – CB – Sophomore; 24 Rob Fiscalini III – S – (redshirt) Junior; 5 Dasheon Frierson – CB – Junior; 40 Ryan Harper – S – Sophomore; 12 Forrest Hightower – LCB – (redshirt) Sophomore; 29 Chris Hill – CB – (redshirt) Junior; 87 Akeem King – S – (redshirt) Sophomore; 16 Miles Milner – CB – Freshman; 39 Cullen Newsome – SS – (redshirt) Senior; 6 Damon Ogburn, Jr. – LCB – Junior; 81 James Orth – FS – Senior; 8 Jimmy Pruitt – LCB – Freshman; 26 Travis Talianko – SS – Freshman; 25 Ronnie Yell – RCB – Senior; Special teams: 22 Alex Anastasi – PK – (redshirt) Freshman; 59 Ryan DiSalvo – LS – Freshman; 39 Arthur Gilbreath – LS – Junior; 40 Ryan Harper – P – Sophomore; 12 Austin Lopez – PK – Freshman; 41 Jeffrey Telles – LS – (redshirt) Sophomore; 10 Harrison Waid – P – (redshirt) Junior

== After the season ==
=== Awards ===
Conference

Travis Johnson earned the WAC Defensive Player of the Year award. With 16 honorees, San Jose State led all WAC teams in 2012 for All-WAC honors. Named to the All-WAC first team were Noel Grigsby, Ryan Otten, Nicholas Kaspar, David Quessenberry, Travis Johnson, Travis Raciti, Vince Buhagiar, Keith Smith, and Bené Benwikere. Named to the All-WAC second team were Chandler Jones, David Fales, De'Leon Eskridge, Anthony Larceval, David Tuitupou, Austin Lopez, and Tyler Ervin.

National

Travis Johnson was invited to the East-West Shrine Game and was named to the Academic All-America second team. Johnson, Ryan Otten, and David Quessenberry all got Senior Bowl invitations.

=== NFL draft ===
In the 2013 NFL draft, David Quessenberry was selected in the sixth round and 176th overall by the Houston Texans.

=== Conference change ===
On July 1, 2013, San Jose State officially became a member of the Mountain West Conference (MWC). San Jose State football followed fellow WAC school Utah State to the MWC and reunited with Hawaii in football only and Boise State, Fresno State, Nevada, and several other fellow former WAC schools in football and many other sports. The WAC stopped sponsoring football after the 2012 season.
