= Keith Smith (fullback) =

American football player (born 1992)

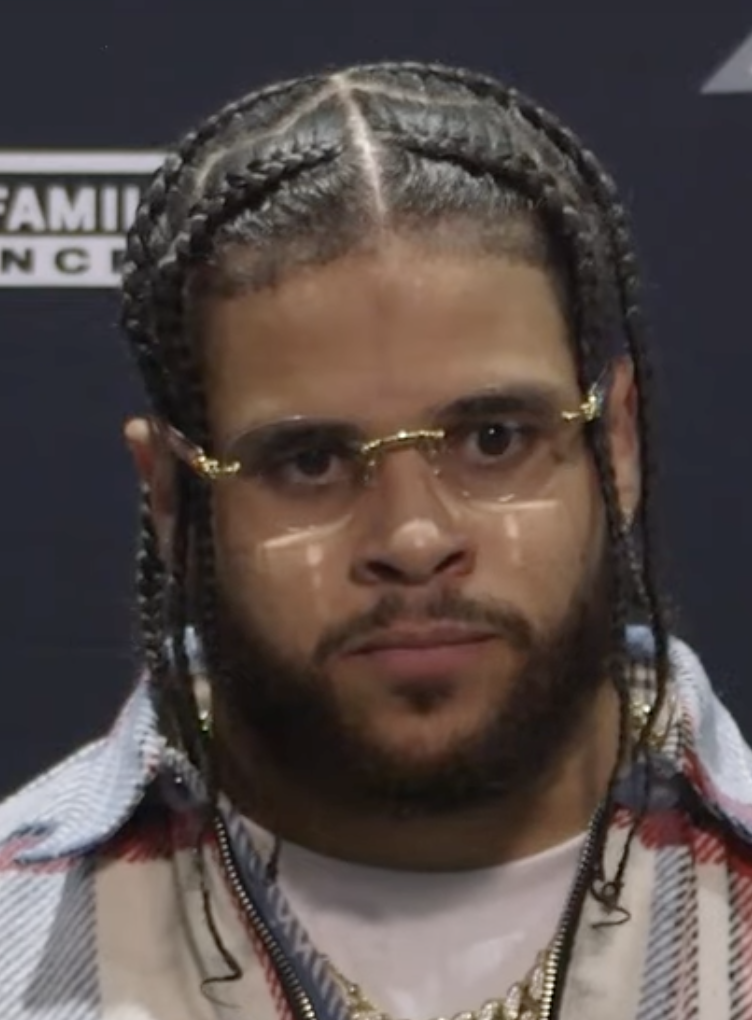
- Smith in 2021

No. 57, 56, 41, 40
- Position: Fullback

Personal information
- Born: April 8, 1992 (age 34); Pomona, California, U.S.
- Listed height: 6 ft 0 in (1.83 m)
- Listed weight: 240 lb (109 kg)

Career information
- High school: Charter Oak (Covina, California)
- College: San Jose State (2010–2013)
- NFL draft: 2014: undrafted

Career history
- Dallas Cowboys (2014–2017); Oakland Raiders (2018); Atlanta Falcons (2019–2023)

Awards and highlights
- Division I FBS leading tackler; First-team All-MWC (2013); First-team All-WAC (2012); 2× second-team All-WAC (2010–2011); WAC Freshman of the Year (2010)

Career NFL statistics
- Rushing yards: 53
- Rushing average: 2.4
- Receptions: 38
- Receiving yards: 238
- Stats at Pro Football Reference

Alton Keith Smith Jr. (born April 8, 1992) is an American former professional football player who was a fullback in the National Football League (NFL). He played college football for the San Jose State Spartans.

== Early life ==
Born in Pomona, California, Smith began playing football in the fourth grade. At the age of 11, Smith met Indianapolis Colts cornerback and Charter Oak graduate Jason David, who was dating Smith's older sister. David commented about Smith: "...he was so eager for knowledge, he was so eager to get better, he was willing to do whatever it took. He studied film, worked out on weekends and got better and better." Smith is now David's brother-in-law.

He attended Charter Oak High School, where he played high school football, in Covina. As a junior, he started at linebacker, collecting 110 tackles, 5 sacks and 3 fumble recoveries, while receiving All-CIF Southeast Southern Section honors. As a senior, he tallied 132 tackles (90 solo), receiving 2009 Miramonte League Defensive Player of the Year and All-California Interscholastic Federation Southeast Southern Section honors. In track, he competed in the shot put.

College recruiting
Name	Hometown	School	Height	Weight	40^{‡}	Commit date
Keith Smith; LB	Covina, CA	Charter Oak HS	6 ft 0 in (1.83 m)	207 lb (94 kg)	4.9	Jan 19, 2010
Keith Smith; LB	Recruit ratings: Scout: Rivals: (73)					
Overall recruit ranking: Scout: 60 (MLB), 76 (school) Rivals: 101 (school) ESPN: 69 (ILB), 180 (CA)
‡ Refers to 40-yard dash; Note: In many cases, Scout, Rivals, 247Sports, On3, and ESPN may conflict in their listings of height, weight and 40 time.; In these cases, the average was taken. ESPN grades are on a 100-point scale.; Sources: "2010 San Jose St. Football Commitment List". Rivals.; "2010 San Jose State College Football Recruiting Commits". Scout.; "San Jose State Spartans 2010 Player Commits". ESPN.; "Scout.com Team Recruiting Rankings". Scout.; "2010 Team Ranking". Rivals.com.

== College career ==
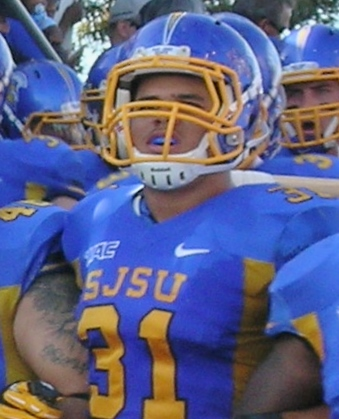
Smith at San Jose State in 2012

Smith accepted a football scholarship from San José State University, playing for the San Jose State Spartans football team from 2010 to 2013 as an inside linebacker. In 49 games, Smith made 45 starts and had 476 total tackles, the second most among all-time San Jose State players. In addition, he had 29 tackles for loss and eight forced fumbles. Smith played under head coach Mike MacIntyre from 2010 to 2012 and Ron Caragher in 2013.

As a freshman in 2010, Smith played in all 13 games and started the last nine. With 116 tackles and 14 tackles for loss, Smith led all freshmen in NCAA Division I FBS in those categories. Smith earned Academic All-Western Athletic Conference (WAC), Football Writers Association of America Freshman All-America, second-team All-WAC, and San Jose State Scholar-Athlete honors this season. However, San Jose State finished the season 1–12.

As a sophomore in 2011, San Jose State improved to a 5–7 record. Smith had the most on average tackles per game this year with 6 tackles per game; he had 104 total tackles, 3.5 tackles for loss, three forced fumbles, and two passes defended. For the second year in a row, Smith earned second-team All-WAC honors.

As a junior in 2012, Smith had 97 tackles, 3.5 tackles for loss, four forced fumbles, and eight passes defended. Smith made his first interception on October 27 against Texas State. On November 17 against BYU, Smith matched a career single-game high with 19 tackles and added two tackles for loss, two forced fumbles, one sack, and a pass deflection. With 1:16 left in the game against BYU, Smith hurdled over a BYU blocker and sacked BYU quarterback Riley Nelson on Nelson's blind side and also forced a fumble. San Jose State recovered the fumble and sealed the 20–14 victory. For this game-ending play, Smith won WAC Defensive Player of the Week honors. San Jose State ended the season 11–2 by beating Bowling Green in the 2012 Military Bowl 29–20. With 4:22 remaining and San Jose State up 22–20, Smith recovered a fumble forced by linebacker Travis Johnson, and San Jose State advanced the ball in two minutes for a touchdown.

As a senior in 2013, Smith had 159 tackles and 13.3 tackles per game—both the most among all FBS players this season—along with eight tackles for loss, two forced fumbles, one interception, and one pass defended. Smith reached new career records, with two games with at least 20 tackles, on September 21 against Minnesota and September 27 against Utah State. In the San Jose State regular season finale on November 29, a 62–52 win over #16 Fresno State, Smith intercepted a pass by Derek Carr and ended Carr's streak of 305 passes without an interception. Despite bowl eligibility with a 6–6 record, San Jose State was not selected for a bowl. Smith graduated from San Jose State with a B.A. in communication studies in December 2013.

== Professional career ==
Pre-draft measurables
Height	Weight	Arm length	Hand span	40-yard dash	10-yard split	20-yard split	20-yard shuttle	Three-cone drill	Vertical jump	Broad jump	Bench press
5 ft 11 1/2 in (1.82 m)	233 lb (106 kg)	31 3/4 in (0.81 m)	10 in (0.25 m)	4.98 s	1.76 s	2.87 s	4.53 s	6.87 s	31 in (0.79 m)	9 ft 5 in (2.87 m)	26 reps
All values taken from San Jose State's Pro Day.

=== Dallas Cowboys ===
==== 2014 season ====
Smith was signed as an undrafted free agent by the Dallas Cowboys after the 2014 NFL draft on May 11. Multiple injuries on the linebacker corps forced the team to sign him to the active roster for depth purposes on September 20. Smith made his NFL debut in the Cowboys' 34–31 season-opening win over the St. Louis Rams. He was waived the following day and signed to the practice squad. On October 4, he was promoted to the roster and released two days later. On October 18, he was promoted to the active roster and was later released on November 14. He remained on the roster after being added again on November 26, 2014. Smith finished his rookie season with ten game appearances.

==== 2015 season ====
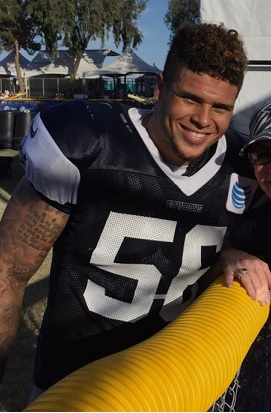
Smith at the Dallas Cowboys training camp in 2015.

On May 14, 2015, Smith was released after rookie minicamp to make room for free agent safety Danny McCray. He was re-signed on July 31, a day after linebacker Keith Rivers announced his retirement. He made the team because of his special teams ability and appeared in four games until being released on October 5, to make room for a suspended Rolando McClain. On October 7, he was re-signed to the Cowboys' practice squad. On November 14, he was elevated to the active squad for depth purposes while linebacker Sean Lee was out with a concussion. Smith played on November 15 against the Tampa Bay Buccaneers. On November 16, he was waived to make room for linebacker Mark Nzeocha. On November 18, he was re-signed to the practice squad.

At the end of the 2015 season, at his exit meeting with head coach Jason Garrett, Smith was told he was being converted into a fullback based on his work with the scout team, in order to give him a better chance to make the roster.

==== 2016 season ====
After the team chose not to re-sign Tyler Clutts, he entered OTAs competing with Rod Smith for the starting position. Although they both made the team, Keith was named the starting fullback at the end of training camp. Smith had his first career carry for a three-yard gain in the Cowboys' season-opening loss to the New York Giants. The next game, he made his first career reception on a five-yard pass from quarterback Dak Prescott during a 27–23 victory over the Washington Redskins. On January 1, 2017, he earned his first career start during a 27–13 loss to the Philadelphia Eagles. He contributed to rookie running back Ezekiel Elliott winning the NFL rushing title, while finishing his first season as a fullback appearing in 16 games with one start. He was a core special teams player.

==== 2017 season ====
Smith remained as the team's starting fullback, playing in 16 games, while blocking for Elliott and Alfred Morris.

He entered the 2018 offseason as a restricted free agent, after the Cowboys gambled by not extending him a tender offer, looking to bring him back at a lower salary. The team ended up losing him and was forced to trade for fullback Jamize Olawale.

=== Oakland Raiders ===
On March 15, 2018, Smith signed a two-year contract with the Oakland Raiders, reuniting with special teams coach Rich Bisaccia, who also had this role with the Cowboys. He appeared in all 16 games with three starts.

In 2019, he suffered a knee injury that sidelined him for the majority of training camp. Due to this injury, rookie fullback Alec Ingold became the Raiders' primary fullback in his place.. On August 31, 2019, Smith was released by the Raiders.

=== Atlanta Falcons ===
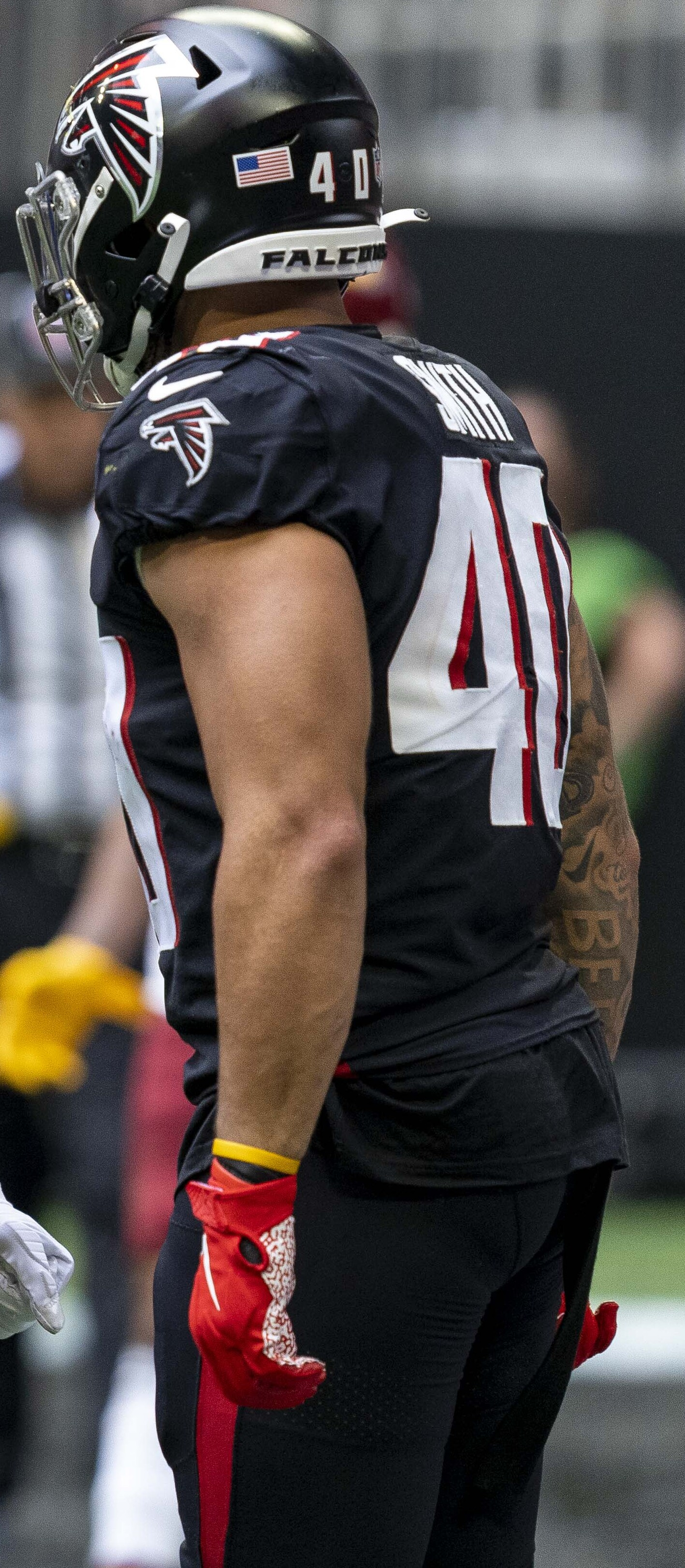
Smith with the Falcons in 2021

On September 2, 2019, Smith was signed by the Atlanta Falcons, to replace an injured Ricky Ortiz. He appeared in all 16 games with five starts.

On March 14, 2020, Smith signed a three-year contract extension with the Falcons. He was placed on the reserve/COVID-19 list by the Falcons on July 29, 2020. He was activated on August 15, 2020. He appeared in all 16 games with seven starts in the 2020 season.

In the 2021 season, he appeared in all 17 games with eight starts. In the 2022 season, he appeared in 17 games and started six.

On March 13, 2023, Smith signed a one-year contract extension with the Falcons. Smith was fined $87,418 by the NFL after he knocked Detroit Lions running back Zonovan Knight to the ground with his helmet while blocking. However, the play did not result in an in-game penalty.

In a Week 5 win against the Houston Texans, he caught a pass for 28 yards.

== Personal life ==
On May 24, 2023, Smith was arrested in Buckhead, Georgia on traffic charges. The situation stemmed from a speeding ticket that Smith had received earlier in the year, which he then paid and believed the situation was resolved. However, a miscommunication occurred and his license was suspended, unknowingly to him. When he was pulled over for an expired registration, he was then arrested for driving with a suspended license.

== See also ==
- List of NCAA major college football yearly tackles leaders
