= Ryan Otten =

American football player (born 1990)

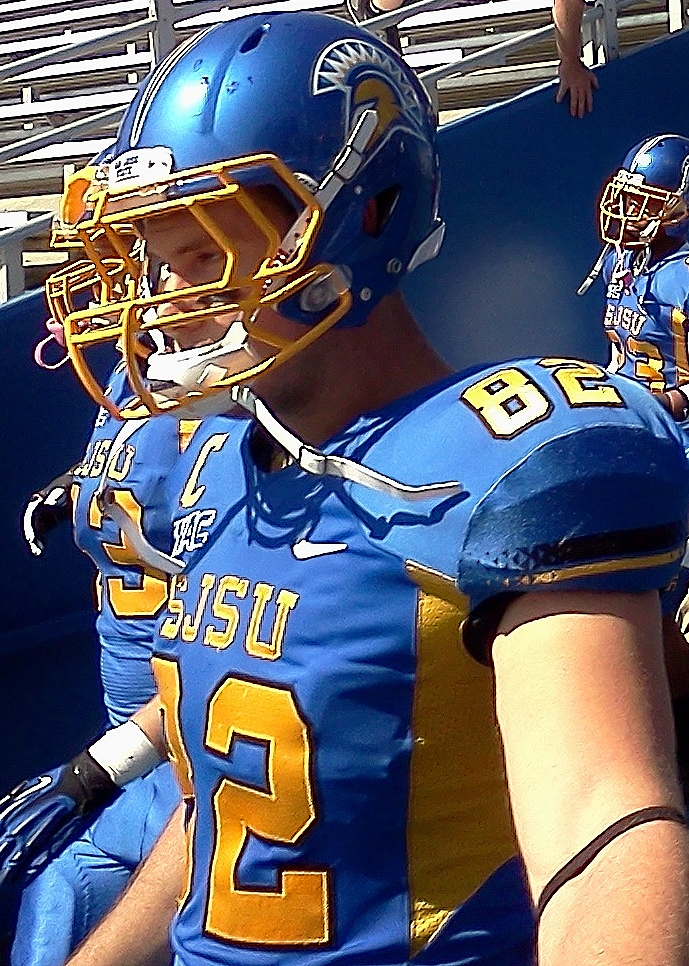
- Otten before San Jose State's 2012 homecoming game

No. 88, 82
- Position: Tight end

Personal information
- Born: April 7, 1990 (age 36); Carmichael, California, U.S.
- Listed height: 6 ft 5 in (1.96 m)
- Listed weight: 230 lb (104 kg)

Career information
- High school: Del Oro (Loomis, California)
- College: San Jose State
- NFL draft: 2013: undrafted

Career history
- Jacksonville Jaguars (2013)*; San Diego Chargers (2013–2014)*; Cincinnati Bengals (2014)*; Minnesota Vikings (2014–2015)*
- * Offseason or practice squad member only

Awards and highlights
- 2× First-team All-WAC (2011, 2012)
- Stats at Pro Football Reference

Ryan James Otten (born April 7, 1990) is an American former professional football tight end. He was signed by the Jacksonville Jaguars as an undrafted free agent in 2013. He played college football at San Jose State.

== Early life ==
Otten was born in Carmichael, California and graduated from Del Oro High School in Loomis, California in 2008. As a senior in 2007, Otten was a first-team All-NorCal selection by Scout.com. Additionally, Otten won the National Football Foundation High School Scholar-Athlete Award in 2007.

College recruiting
Name	Hometown	School	Height	Weight	40^{‡}	Commit date
Ryan Otten; TE	Loomis, CA	Del Oro HS	6 ft 5 in (1.96 m)	200 lb (91 kg)	4.59	Jan 27, 2008
Ryan Otten; TE	Recruit ratings: Scout: Rivals: 247Sports: (66)					
Overall recruit ranking: Scout: 77 (TE), 119 (school) Rivals: 116 (school) 247Sports: 160 (CA)
‡ Refers to 40-yard dash; Note: In many cases, Scout, Rivals, 247Sports, On3, and ESPN may conflict in their listings of height, weight and 40 time.; In these cases, the average was taken. ESPN grades are on a 100-point scale.; Sources: "2008 San Jose St. Football Commitment List". Rivals.; "2008 San Jose State College Football Team Recruiting Prospects". Scout.; "San Jose State Football 2008 Player Commits". ESPN.; "Scout.com Team Recruiting Rankings". Scout.; "2008 Team Ranking". Rivals.com.; "San Jose State 2008 Football Commits". 247Sports.

== College career ==
At San Jose State University, Otten redshirted his freshman year in 2008 then played for the San Jose State Spartans football team from 2009 to 2012. As a redshirt freshman in 2009 under coach Dick Tomey, Otten played all 12 games with 7 starts and had 10 receptions for 78 yards. In 2010 as a sophomore playing under new coach Mike MacIntyre, Otten had 17 receptions for 201 yards and 3 touchdowns in 6 games; he missed 6 games due to injury. Otten's role on the team earned comparisons to former Dallas Cowboys tight end Doug Cosbie: "catching third-down passes in traffic and sneaking behind the defense for long gains," as San Jose Mercury News sportswriter Jon Wilner put it.

As a junior in 2011, Otten played 11 games, with 52 receptions for 739 yards and 5 touchdowns, becoming one of the best receiving tight ends in the nation. He was also a first-team All-WAC and honorable mention Sports Illustrated All-American selection in a season where San Jose State improved from 1-12 in 2010 to 5-7.

In his senior season in 2012, a season where San Jose State went 11-2 including a victory in the 2012 Military Bowl, Otten played all 13 games and had 47 receptions for 742 yards and 4 touchdowns. Again, Otten was a first-team All-WAC selection and Sports Illustrated honorable mention All-American in 2012. Otten led all Division I FBS tight ends in yards per catch with 15.8 in 2012.

== Professional career ==
Pre-draft measurables
Height	Weight	Arm length	Hand span	40-yard dash	10-yard split	20-yard split	20-yard shuttle	Three-cone drill	Vertical jump	Broad jump	Bench press
6 ft 5 in (1.96 m)	230 lb (104 kg)	33 3/8 in (0.85 m)	9 5/8 in (0.24 m)	4.69 s	1.64 s	2.75 s	4.62 s	7.50 s	33 in (0.84 m)	9 ft 4 in (2.84 m)	17 reps
Arm and hand spans were taken at the NFL Scouting Combine; all other measurements were taken on Pro Day at San Jose State.

=== Jacksonville Jaguars ===
After going undrafted in the 2013 NFL draft, Otten signed with the Jacksonville Jaguars as an undrafted free agent on Monday April 29, 2013. He was released on August 30, 2013.

=== San Diego Chargers ===
On October 9, 2013, Otten was signed to the San Diego Chargers' practice squad. Otten signed a future contract with the Chargers on January 16, 2014. The Chargers released Otten on August 25, 2014.

=== Cincinnati Bengals ===
On September 9, 2014, the Cincinnati Bengals signed Otten to the practice squad. On September 16, the Bengals cut Otten.

=== Minnesota Vikings ===
The Minnesota Vikings signed Otten to the practice squad on November 12, 2014, and released Otten on May 7, 2015.
