= Bené Benwikere =

American football player (born 1991)

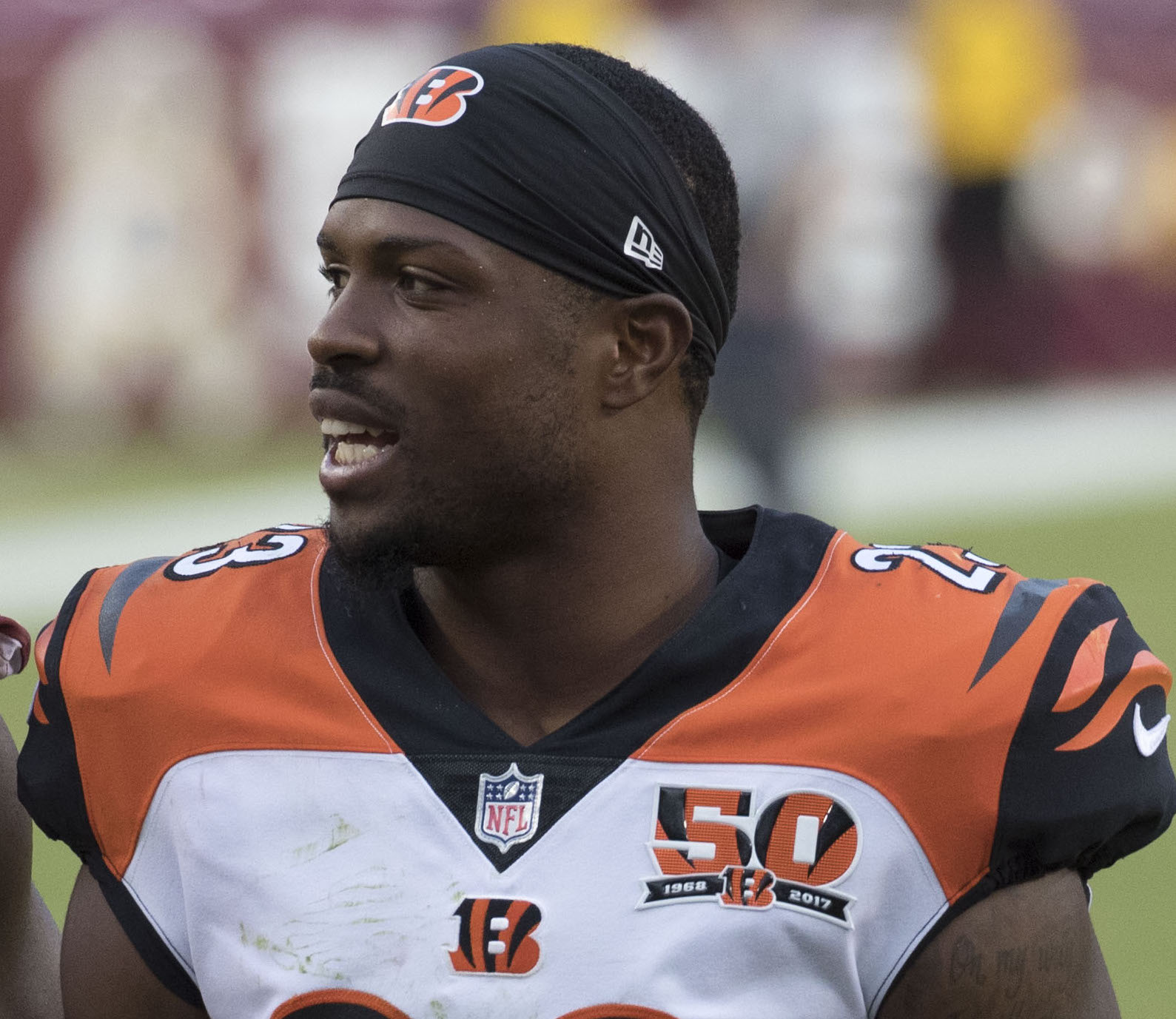
- Benwikere with the Cincinnati Bengals in 2017

No. 23, 25, 37
- Position: Cornerback

Personal information
- Born: September 3, 1991 (age 35); Los Angeles, California, U.S.
- Listed height: 6 ft 0 in (1.83 m)
- Listed weight: 195 lb (88 kg)

Career information
- High school: Junípero Serra (Gardena, California)
- College: San Jose State
- NFL draft: 2014: 5th round, 148th overall pick

Career history
- Carolina Panthers (2014–2016); Miami Dolphins (2016); Green Bay Packers (2016)*; Cincinnati Bengals (2017)*; Dallas Cowboys (2017); Arizona Cardinals (2018); Oakland Raiders (2018); Minnesota Vikings (2019)*
- * Offseason or practice squad member only

Awards and highlights
- First-team All-MW (2013); First-team All-WAC (2012)

Career NFL statistics
- Total tackles: 158
- Sacks: 1.5
- Forced fumbles: 3
- Fumble recoveries: 4
- Interceptions: 3
- Stats at Pro Football Reference

Bené Sylvion Benwikere (/bəˈneɪ bɛnˈwɪkəri/ bə-NAY ben-WIK-ə-ree; born September 3, 1991) is an American former professional football player who was a cornerback in the National Football League (NFL). He was selected by the Carolina Panthers in the fifth round of the 2014 NFL draft. He played college football for the San Jose State Spartans.

== Early life ==
Benwikere grew up in Los Angeles; his father immigrated to the United States from Nigeria. As a freshman, Benwikere attended View Park High School and played eight-man football before transferring to Junípero Serra High School in Gardena, California. In his first year at Serra, he earned a starting cornerback spot. The Serra Cavaliers included future NFL players such as Marqise Lee, Robert Woods, Paul Richardson, and George Farmer. As a senior, Benwikere helped Serra win the 2009 California Interscholastic Federation Division 3 title.

A three-sport letterwinner, Benwikere also played basketball and was a sprinter (11.0s in the 100m) and jumper on the track team.

Benwikere attended football camp at UCLA during high school and had scholarship offers from San Jose State, Iowa State, New Mexico, San Diego State, and UNLV.

College recruiting
Name	Hometown	School	Height	Weight	40^{‡}	Commit date
Bené Benwikere; CB	Los Angeles, CA	Junípero Serra HS	5 ft 11 in (1.80 m)	180 lb (82 kg)	4.5	Feb 2, 2010
Bené Benwikere; CB	Recruit ratings: Scout: Rivals: 247Sports: ESPN:					
Overall recruit ranking: Scout: 101 (CB), 76 (school) Rivals: 75 (CB), 101 (school) 247Sports: 75 (CB), 106 (CA), 93 (school) ESPN: 75 (CB), 141 (CA)
‡ Refers to 40-yard dash; Note: In many cases, Scout, Rivals, 247Sports, On3, and ESPN may conflict in their listings of height, weight and 40 time.; In these cases, the average was taken. ESPN grades are on a 100-point scale.; Sources: "2010 San Jose St. Football Commitment List". Rivals.; "2010 San Jose State College Football Team Recruiting Prospects". Scout.; "San Jose State Spartans 2010 Player Commits". ESPN.; "Scout.com Team Recruiting Rankings". Scout.; "2010 Team Ranking". Rivals.com.; "San Jose State 2010 Football Commits". 247Sports.

== College career ==
Benwikere committed to San Jose State on February 2, 2010. He was part of coach Mike MacIntyre's first recruiting class at San Jose State, and Benwikere played under MacIntyre from 2010 to 2012 and Ron Caragher in 2013.

As a true freshman in 2010, he played in all 13 games and made 9 starts. During his sophomore year, he played in ten games and made two starts. In 2012, Benwikere was named first-team All-Western Athletic Conference (WAC). He played in 13 games and started 8. Benwikere scored two defensive touchdowns off a 37-yard fumble recovery against New Mexico State and a 47-yard interception return against Idaho. On November 24 against Louisiana Tech, Benwikere tied a San Jose State record with three interceptions. In San Jose State's victory over Bowling Green in the 2012 Military Bowl, Benwikere blocked a punt for a safety.

In his senior season in 2013, Benwikere was named first-team All-Mountain West Conference (MWC), started 11 games, and had a streak of four consecutive games with an interception. In his San Jose State career, Benwikere had 214 tackles (including 11.5 for loss), 3 forced fumbles, 2 fumbles recovered (1 returned for touchdown), 14 interceptions (1 returned for touchdown), and 22 passes broken up. Benwikere graduated from San Jose State with a B.A. in sociology.

== Professional career ==
Pre-draft measurables
Height	Weight	Arm length	Hand span	40-yard dash	10-yard split	20-yard split	20-yard shuttle	Three-cone drill	Vertical jump	Broad jump	Bench press
5 ft 10 3/4 in (1.80 m)	195 lb (88 kg)	30 in (0.76 m)	9 1/8 in (0.23 m)	4.63 s	1.65 s	2.72 s	4.38 s	6.94 s	40 1/2 in (1.03 m)	10 ft 2 in (3.10 m)	10 reps
All values from NFL Scouting Combine

=== Carolina Panthers ===
==== 2014 season ====
The Carolina Panthers selected Benwikere in the fifth round (148th overall) of the 2014 NFL draft. The Panthers traded a fifth (168th overall) and seventh round pick (225th overall) to the Minnesota Vikings and received a fifth round pick (148th overall) in order to draft Benwikere. Carolina Panthers’ General Manager Dave Gettleman noted the Panthers’ had graded Benwikere as a fourth round pick. Benwikere was the 19th cornerback drafted in 2014.

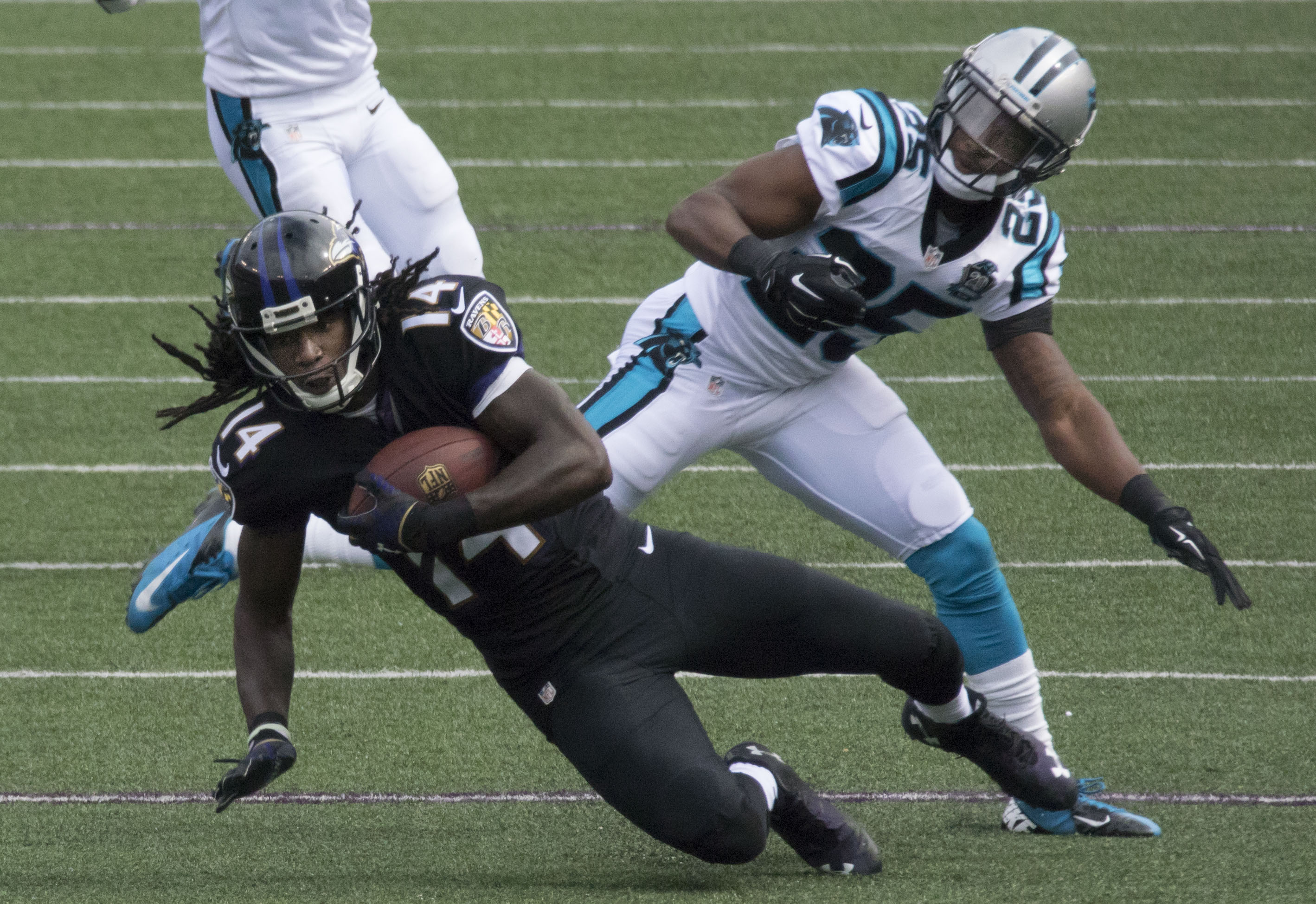
Benwikere (#25) and Marlon Brown.

On May 20, 2014, the Panthers signed Benwikere to a four-year, $2.41 million contract that includes a signing bonus of $199,000.

As a rookie, during the preseason, Benwikere won the starting nickel corner position on the Panther defense over veteran Charles Godfrey. On his NFL debut on September 7, 2014, in Carolina's 20–14 win over the Tampa Bay Buccaneers, Benwikere had 4 tackles, 1 pass deflection, and a recovery of a forced fumble by teammate Luke Kuechly on Tampa running back Bobby Rainey. Benwikere's fumble recovery enabled Carolina to run out the clock en route to their victory. In a week 2 victory over the Detroit Lions, Benwikere allowed only 20% of his targets to catch a pass, had a pressure, and recorded a pass deflection that was nearly picked off by teammate, Star Lotulelei. Through the first two weeks of the season, Pro Football Focus (PFF) rated Benwikere as the second best cornerback in the NFL, allowing a completion percentage of only 44.4% of passes thrown in his area.

In the first half of the October 5 game against the Chicago Bears, Benwikere left the game in the first half after twisting his ankle. As of November 9, Benwikere has been inactive. In the Panthers week 14 game against the New Orleans Saints, Benwikere recorded his first NFL interception against Saints quarterback Drew Brees. Despite giving up 8 catches on 10 targets against the Saints, he only gave up 48 yards and his rating when targeted was a 47.1. Benwikere didn't allow a single touchdown in 254 snaps and 45 targets (best among rookie corners who played at least 25 percent of their team's snaps). On December 23, 2014, Benwikere was named to the Sports Illustrated 2014 All-Rookie Team. Over the final eight weeks of the regular season, PFF rated Benwikere as the best cover corner in the NFL. During the Panthers playoff victory over the Arizona Cardinals, Benwikere gave up only one reception for 21 yards for the game. On January 13, 2015, Benwikere was named to the PFF 2014 All-Rookie Team. He was also named to the All-Rookie teams for both ESPN and Sports Illustrated. For his rookie season, Benwikere allowed a rookie-low 72.9 opposing quarterback rating, no touchdowns, and was the third best in the NFL in the yards per reception allowed in 459 regular-season snaps.

==== 2015 season ====
With the Panthers acquisition of Charles Tillman during the offseason, Benwikere was named the Panthers starting nickelback to open the season. Through the first three weeks of the season, the only two cornerbacks who were targeted 20 or more times and had not allowed a pass for more than 16 yards were Benwikere and teammate, Josh Norman. During the Panthers 44–16 victory over the Washington Redskins, Benwikere recorded his first career strip-sack against quarterback Kirk Cousins and only allowed 14 receiving yards in his zone. On December 13, during a game against the Atlanta Falcons, Benwikere suffered a fractured leg, and was placed on season-ending injury reserve.

On February 7, 2016, Benwikere's Panthers played in Super Bowl 50. In the game, the Panthers fell to the Denver Broncos by a score of 24–10.

==== 2016 season ====
On October 7, Benwikere was released by Carolina after the Panthers defense allowed 300 receiving yards to Atlanta Falcons' wide receiver Julio Jones for only the sixth such occurrence in NFL history. Benwikere admitted having some "conditioning issues", allowing the Falcons' Jones to get a step on him.

=== Miami Dolphins ===
Benwikere was claimed off waivers by the Miami Dolphins on October 10, 2016. He was released by the Dolphins on November 8, and was re-signed to the practice squad.

=== Green Bay Packers ===
Benwikere was signed to the Green Bay Packers' practice squad on January 17, 2017.

=== Cincinnati Bengals ===
On February 14, 2017, Benwikere was signed by the Cincinnati Bengals.

=== Dallas Cowboys ===
On September 2, 2017, the Dallas Cowboys traded a conditional 2019 sixth-round draft pick (#198-Tim Harris) to the Bengals in exchange for Benwikere. The Cowboys acquired him to provide depth while rookies Chidobe Awuzie and Jourdan Lewis recovered from hamstring strains. He appeared in 12 games playing mainly on special teams, registering 2 tackles in only 10 defensive snaps.

=== Arizona Cardinals ===
On March 23, 2018, Benwikere signed with the Arizona Cardinals, reuniting with head coach Steve Wilks who was his defensive backs coach with the Panthers. He played in 11 games, starting eight, before being released by the Cardinals on November 26.

=== Oakland Raiders ===
On December 5, 2018, Benwikere was signed by the Oakland Raiders.

=== Minnesota Vikings ===
On August 3, 2019, Benwikere was signed by the Minnesota Vikings. He was released on August 27.

== NFL career statistics ==
Regular season statistics
Year	Team	Games		Tackles				Interceptions						Fumbles	
Year	Team	GP	GS	Cmb	Solo	Ast	Sck	PD	Int	Yds	Avg	Lng	TD	FF	FR
2014	CAR	10	6	33	24	9	0.0	7	1	0	0.0	0	0	1	0
2015	CAR	13	4	59	44	15	1.0	9	0	0	0.0	0	0	1	0
2016	CAR	4	4	10	8	2	0.0	4	1	1	1.0	1	0	0	0
2017	DAL	12	0	2	2	0	0.0	1	0	0	0.0	0	0	0	1
2018	ARI	11	8	12	0	12	0.5	4	1	21	21	21	0	1	0
2018	OAK	4	0	1	0	1	0.0	0	0	0	0	0	0	0	0
Total		54	22	158	119	39	1.5	25	3	22	20.0	21	0	3	1
Source: NFL.com

Postseason statistics
Year	Team	Games		Tackles				Interceptions						Fumbles	
Year	Team	GP	GS	Cmb	Solo	Ast	Sck	PD	Int	Yds	Avg	Lng	TD	FF	FR
2014	CAR	2	2	2	2	0	0.0	1	0	0	0.0	0	0	0	0
Total		2	2	2	2	0	0.0	1	0	0	0.0	0	0	0	0
Source: pro-football-reference.com

== Personal life ==
His uncle, William Lackey, played in the Arena Football League. Benwikere's cousin Chris Owens also played cornerback in the NFL.
