= Bill Walsh Legacy Game =

American college football rivalry

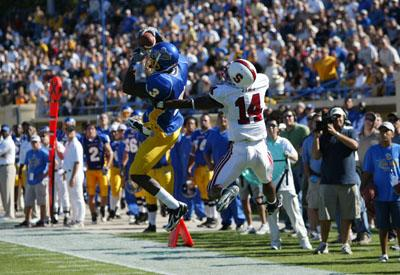
- James Jones scores a touchdown against Stanford in '06; San José won 35–34.

- San Jose State Spartans Stanford; Cardinal
- Sport: American football
- Type: Collegiate
- First meeting: October 11, 1900; Stanford, 35–0
- Latest meeting: September 27, 2025; Stanford, 30–29
- Next meeting: November 25, 2028
- Stadiums: CEFCU and Stanford

Statistics
- Total meetings: 69
- All-time series: Stanford leads, 53–15–1
- Largest victory: Stanford, 54–0 (1953) and 57–3 (2011)
- Longest win streak: Stanford, 11 (1900–1953)
- Current win streak: Stanford, 1 (2025–present)

The Bill Walsh Legacy Game is the name given to the San Jose State–Stanford football rivalry. It is a college football rivalry between the San Jose State Spartans football team of San Jose State University and the Stanford Cardinal football team of Stanford University. The two teams have played each other 69 times since 1900. The rivalry was named in honor of Bill Walsh, following his death in 2007. Walsh played at San Jose State and had two stints as Stanford's head coach.

== Historical overview ==
The series between San Jose State and Stanford began in 1900 with a home-and-home series between the two schools in the same season. Stanford won both games, 35–0 on October 11, 1900, in San Jose and 24–0 on October 24, 1900, at Stanford. Stanford won the first eleven games of the series.

On November 13, 1954, San Jose State defeated Stanford for the first time by a final score of 19–14.

Throughout the over-100-year history of the series, most games in this series have been played at Stanford. Only the 1900, 1995, 2001, 2006, and 2024 games have been played in San Jose.

Stanford's longest winning streak in this series is 11, beginning in 1900 and ending in 1953. This win streak covered the first 11 games in the series. San Jose State's longest winning streak is three, achieved from 1981 to 1983 and again from 1998 to 2000.

The games from 1979 to 1982 pitted Stanford star quarterback John Elway against his father, Jack Elway, who served as the SJSU head football coach from 1979 to 1983. The two teams split the series 2–2, with the younger Elway defeating his father's team in 1979 and 1980, and the elder Jack Elway defeating his son's team in 1981 and 1982.

In 2007, following the death of San Jose State alumnus and former Stanford coach Bill Walsh, the near-annual game played between the two schools was renamed the Bill Walsh Legacy Game.

The 2013 game, a 34–13 win for Stanford, was the final scheduled game between the two schools, reportedly due to the two schools' inability to agree on a home-and-home arrangement for future games.

On July 23, 2014, at the Mountain West Conference football media days event, San Jose State coach Ron Caragher revealed that the two schools were having "initial conversations about resuming their football series by moving to a neutral site at the new Levi's Stadium." San Jose State athletic director Gene Bleymaier later stated: "Even if we have to look out to 2020 and beyond, I'd like to get a long-term agreement in place with Stanford."

On June 22, 2022, Stanford and San Jose State announced an agreement to renew the series with four games: At San Jose State on September 13, 2025; at Stanford on November 28, 2026; at Stanford on November 25, 2028; and at San Jose State on September 1, 2035. On November 1, 2023, Stanford and San Jose State announced two further additional games to the four already scheduled, both at Stanford on November 29, 2024, and September 2, 2034. The 2025 game was moved to Stanford and delayed to September 27 of that year, and the 2026 game was moved to San Jose and delayed to September 20, 2031. An additional game was added at Stanford on September 20, 2036.

== Statistics ==
	San Jose State	Stanford
Games played	69	
Wins	15	53
Ties	1	
Home wins	2	50
Road wins	13	3
Consecutive wins	3	11
Most total points in a game	92	
Most points in a win	44	68
Most points in a loss	38	39
Fewest total points in a game	18	
Largest margin of victory	22	54
Smallest margin of victory	1	1
Total points scored in series	1,182	2,287
Shut-outs of opposing team	0	9
Source: "San Jose State Spartans vs. Stanford Cardinal football series history". Winsipedia.

== Game results ==
San Jose State victories	Stanford victories	Tie games

No.	Date	Location	Winner	Score
1	October 10, 1900	San Jose, CA	Stanford	35–0
2	October 20, 1900	Stanford, CA	Stanford	24–0
3	September 23, 1933	Stanford, CA	Stanford	27–0
4	September 22, 1934	Stanford, CA	Stanford	48–0
5	September 28, 1935	Stanford, CA	Stanford	35–0
6	September 18, 1948	Stanford, CA	Stanford	26–20
7	September 17, 1949	Stanford, CA	Stanford	49–0
8	September 23, 1950	Stanford, CA	#7 Stanford	33–16
9	September 22, 1951	Stanford, CA	Stanford	26–13
10	November 1, 1952	Stanford, CA	Stanford	35–13
11	November 14, 1953	Stanford, CA	#16 Stanford	54–0
12	November 13, 1954	Stanford, CA	San Jose State	19–14
13	October 29, 1955	Stanford, CA	Stanford	34–18
14	October 13, 1956	Stanford, CA	Stanford	40–20
15	September 21, 1957	Stanford, CA	Stanford	46–7
16	October 31, 1959	Stanford, CA	Stanford	54–38
17	October 15, 1960	Stanford, CA	San Jose State	34–20
18	October 14, 1961	Stanford, CA	Stanford	17–6
19	November 17, 1962	Stanford, CA	Stanford	21–9
20	September 21, 1963	Stanford, CA	Stanford	29–13
21	September 19, 1964	Stanford, CA	Stanford	10–8
22	September 17, 1965	Stanford, CA	Stanford	26–6
23	September 17, 1966	Stanford, CA	Stanford	25–21
24	September 30, 1967	Stanford, CA	Stanford	28–14
25	September 21, 1968	Stanford, CA	Stanford	68–20
26	September 20, 1969	Stanford, CA	#16 Stanford	63–21
27	September 19, 1970	Stanford, CA	#4 Stanford	34–3
28	November 13, 1971	Stanford, CA	San Jose State	13–12
29	September 16, 1972	Stanford, CA	Stanford	44–0
30	September 29, 1973	Stanford, CA	Stanford	23–12
31	September 28, 1974	Stanford, CA	Tie	21–21
32	September 27, 1975	Stanford, CA	San Jose State	36–34
33	September 25, 1976	Stanford, CA	Stanford	28–23
34	November 12, 1977	Stanford, CA	Stanford	31–26
35	September 16, 1978	Stanford, CA	Stanford	38–9

No.	Date	Location	Winner	Score
36	September 15, 1979	Stanford, CA	Stanford	45–29
37	October 4, 1980	Stanford, CA	#15 Stanford	35–21
38	September 19, 1981	Stanford, CA	San Jose State	28–6
39	September 18, 1982	Stanford, CA	San Jose State	35–31
40	September 24, 1983	Stanford, CA	San Jose State	23–10
41	September 22, 1984	Stanford, CA	Stanford	28–27
42	September 14, 1985	Stanford, CA	Stanford	41–7
43	September 20, 1986	Stanford, CA	Stanford	28–10
44	September 26, 1987	Stanford, CA	San Jose State	24–17
45	October 8, 1988	Stanford, CA	Stanford	44–12
46	September 30, 1989	Stanford, CA	San Jose State	40–33
47	September 29, 1990	Stanford, CA	San Jose State	29–23
48	September 26, 1992	Stanford, CA	#19 Stanford	37–13
49	September 11, 1993	Stanford, CA	#23 Stanford	31–28
50	September 17, 1994	Stanford, CA	Stanford	51–20
51	September 2, 1995	San Jose, CA	Stanford	47–33
52	September 14, 1996	Stanford, CA	Stanford	25–2
53	September 6, 1997	Stanford, CA	#17 Stanford	28–12
54	September 5, 1998	Stanford, CA	San Jose State	35–23
55	October 2, 1999	Stanford, CA	San Jose State	44–39
56	September 9, 2000	Stanford, CA	San Jose State	40–27
57	December 1, 2001	San Jose, CA	#12 Stanford	41–14
58	September 14, 2002	Stanford, CA	Stanford	63–26
59	September 6, 2003	Stanford, CA	Stanford	31–10
60	September 4, 2004	Stanford, CA	Stanford	43–3
61	September 9, 2006	San Jose, CA	San Jose State	35–34
62	September 15, 2007	Stanford, CA	Stanford	37–0
63	September 20, 2008	Stanford, CA	Stanford	23–10
64	September 19, 2009	Stanford, CA	Stanford	42–17
65	September 3, 2011	Stanford, CA	#7 Stanford	57–3
66	August 31, 2012	Stanford, CA	#21 Stanford	20–17
67	September 7, 2013	Stanford, CA	#5 Stanford	34–13
68	November 29, 2024	San Jose, CA	San Jose State	34–31
69	September 27, 2025	Stanford, CA	Stanford	30–29
Series: Stanford leads 53–15–1

== See also ==
- List of NCAA college football rivalry games
