= Ronnie Yell =

American football player (born 1991)

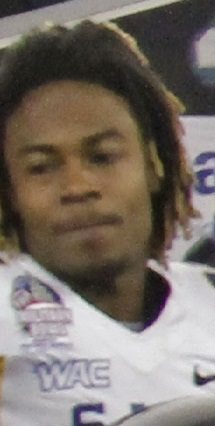
- Yell at the 2012 Military Bowl

No. 25
- Position: Defensive back

Personal information
- Born: April 15, 1991 (age 35); Los Angeles, California, U.S.
- Listed height: 5 ft 10 in (1.78 m)
- Listed weight: 185 lb (84 kg)

Career information
- High school: Lincoln (San Diego, California)
- College: San Jose State

Career history
- 2013: Arizona Cardinals*
- 2013–2017: BC Lions
- 2018: Toronto Argonauts
- * Offseason or practice squad member only

Awards and highlights
- Military Bowl champion (2012)

Career CFL statistics
- Tackles: 168
- Interceptions: 7
- Stats at CFL.ca

Ronald Irving Yell (born April 15, 1991) is an American former professional football player who was a defensive back in theCanadian Football League (CFL). He played college football for the San Jose State Spartans and began his professional football career in 2013 with the Arizona Cardinals of the National Football League (NFL). He then joined the BC Lions late in the 2013 season. Yell was also a member of the Toronto Argonauts.

== Early life ==
Yell was born in Los Angeles, California. His grandfather Bobo Henderson was a Negro league baseball player. After transferring from Crawford High, Yell graduated from Lincoln High School in San Diego in 2009. At Lincoln, Yell was a quarterback on the football team; he played on the basketball and track and field teams as well. Yell also was the activities commissioner for two years on the Lincoln High student body.

College recruiting
Name	Hometown	School	Height	Weight	Commit date
Ronnie Yell; DB	San Diego, CA	Lincoln HS	5 ft 9 in (1.75 m)	165 lb (75 kg)	Feb 4, 2009
Ronnie Yell; DB	Recruit ratings: Scout: Rivals:				
Overall recruit ranking: Scout: 284 (CB); 92 (school) Rivals: 88 (school)
Note: In many cases, Scout, Rivals, 247Sports, On3, and ESPN may conflict in their listings of height and weight.; In these cases, the average was taken. ESPN grades are on a 100-point scale.; Sources: "2009 San Jose St. Football Commitment List". Rivals.; "2009 San Jose State College Football Team Recruiting Prospects". Scout.; "Scout.com Team Recruiting Rankings". Scout.; "2009 Team Ranking". Rivals.com.

== College career ==
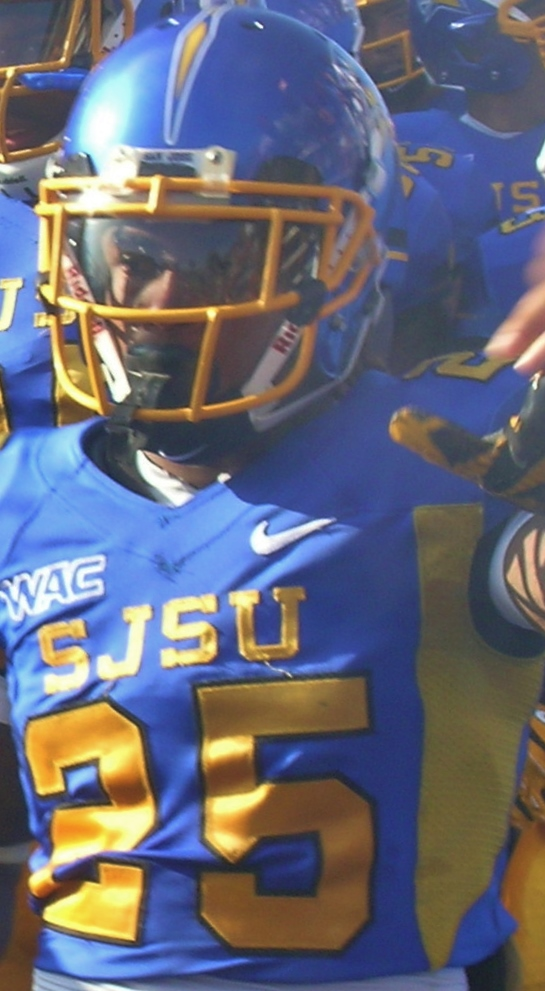
Yell before a game in 2012 at San Jose State Spartan Stadium.

Yell attended San Jose State University and played for the Spartans football team as a defensive back, in 2009 under coach Dick Tomey and from 2010 to 2012 under Mike MacIntyre. As a freshman, Yell played 10 games and started at cornerback in the last six games of 2009 and had 19 tackles and a pass deflected. Yell also became the punt return specialist late in 2009. San Jose State finished the 2009 season 2–10.

In 2010, his sophomore year, Yell played all 13 games and started 10. He had 44 tackles (3 for loss), 11 passes deflected, and one interception. He returned one punt for six yards and 32 kickoffs for 645 yards (an average 20.2 yards per return). In Mike MacIntyre's first year as head coach, San Jose State went 1–12 this season.

For his junior year in 2011, Yell played the final 10 games of the year and started 6. Yell had 37 tackles (1.5 for loss), an interception, 5 tackles, a pass deflected, and 3 punt returns for 42 yards (14 yards per carry). In San Jose State's 38–31 win over Colorado State on October 1, Yell intercepted a Colorado State pass in Colorado State's final possession to seal San Jose State's first road win in 13 games. San Jose State improved to 5–7 in 2011.

As a senior in 2012, Yell played all 13 games and had 41 tackles, 9 passes deflected, and 15 punt returns for 42 yards (2.8 yards average). San Jose State finished the season 11–2, including a victory over Bowling Green in the 2012 Military Bowl in Washington, D. C. Yell broke up 3 passes in that game. Yell graduated from San Jose State in 2013 with a B.A. in sociology.

== Professional career ==
Pre-draft measurables
Height	Weight	40-yard dash	10-yard split	20-yard split	20-yard shuttle	Three-cone drill	Vertical jump	Broad jump	Bench press
5 ft 9 in (1.75 m)	189 lb (86 kg)	4.65 s	1.63 s	2.70 s	4.51 s	7.37 s	33 1/2 in (0.85 m)	10 ft 1 in (3.07 m)	14 reps
All values from Pro Day at San Jose State.

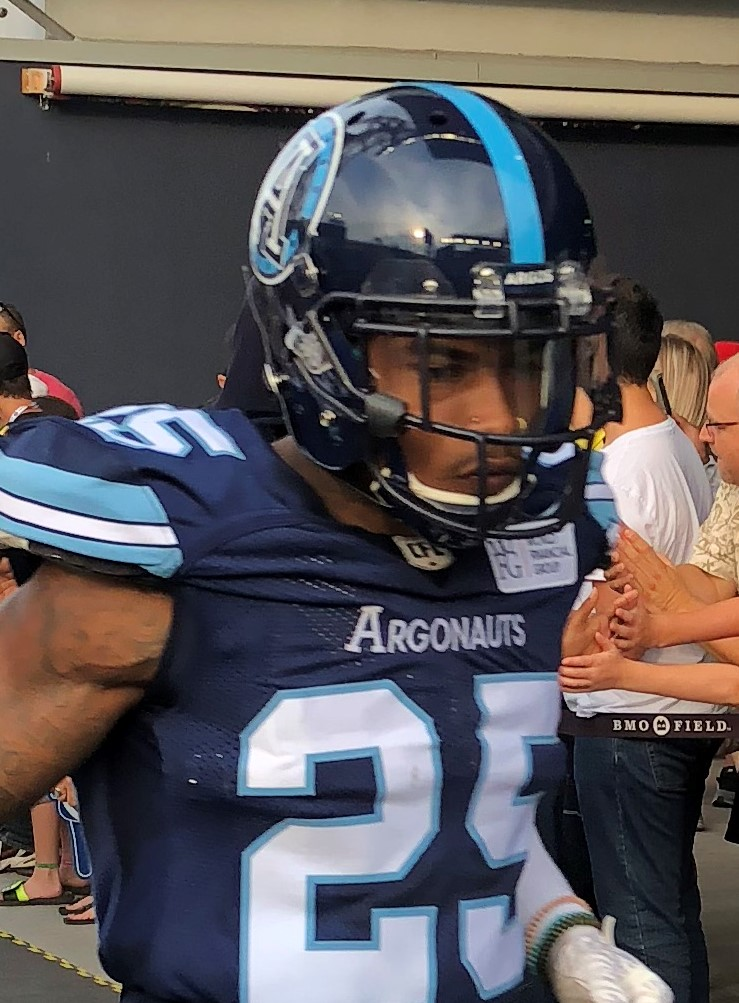
Yell with the Toronto Argonauts in 2018

=== Arizona Cardinals ===
Following the 2013 NFL draft, Yell signed with the Arizona Cardinals as an undrafted free agent on April 29, 2013. Yell played in two preseason games and had one tackle. The Cardinals cut Yell on August 25.

=== BC Lions ===
On October 7, 2013, during the team's practice roster expansion period, the CFL team BC Lions signed Yell, who would remain on the practice roster through the end of the season.

In his preseason debut with the Lions on June 14 against the Edmonton Eskimos, Yell forced a fumble recovered by teammate Alex Hoffman-Ellis, and this play set up BC's winning field goal in a 14–11 win. Yell also had two tackles and an interception.

On August 1, Yell made his first regular season CFL interception in BC's 25–24 win over the previously undefeated Calgary Stampeders and returned it 34 yards for BC's first score of the game. With 51 seconds left and BC leading, Yell forced a Calgary fumble, and BC ran out the clock to 4 seconds remaining. BC won after Calgary's final play was an incomplete pass.

=== Toronto Argonauts ===
Yell became a free agent in 2018 and subsequently signed with the Toronto Argonauts on February 17, 2018, then Yell was released in 2019.
