= 2013 Senior Bowl =

2013 Nike Senior Bowl
- 64th Senior Bowl
North Team	South Team
16	21
Head coach: Dennis Allen (Oakland Raiders)	Head coach: Jim Schwartz (Detroit Lions)
	1	2	3	4	Total
North	0	0	10	6	16
South	14	0	0	7	21
- Date: January 26, 2013
- Season: 2012
- Stadium: Ladd–Peebles Stadium
- Location: Mobile, Alabama
- MVP: EJ Manuel
- Referee: David Smith (SEC)

United States TV coverage
- Network: NFL Network

The 2013 Senior Bowl was an all-star college football exhibition game featuring players from the 2012 college football season, and prospects for the 2013 draft of the professional National Football League (NFL). The 64th edition of the Senior Bowl was won by the South team, 21–16.

The game was played on January 26, 2013, (4 p.m. ET), at Ladd–Peebles Stadium in Mobile, Alabama. The coaching staff of the Detroit Lions, led by head coach Jim Schwartz, coached the South team. The coaching staff of the Oakland Raiders, led by head coach Dennis Allen, coached the North team. Schwartz had previously coached in the 2010 Senior Bowl.

Coverage of the event was provided on the NFL Network. Clothing company Nike was the sponsor for the second consecutive year, and provided apparel for the game. The referee for the game, David Smith of the Southeastern Conference (SEC), had been a quarterback for Alabama and MVP of the 1988 Sun Bowl.

== Rosters ==
=== North Team ===
No.	Name	Position	HT/WT	School
24	Kenjon Barner	RB	5'11"/192	Oregon
43	Steve Beauharnais	LB	6'2"/230	Rutgers
52	Braxston Cave	OL	6'3"/304	Notre Dame
44	Arthur Brown	LB	6'1"/228	Kansas State
99	Michael Buchanan	DL	6'5"/240	Illinois
37	Johnathan Cyprien	DB	6'0"/210	Florida International
17	Will Davis	DB	6'0"/186	Utah State
3	Aaron Dobson	WR	6'2"/206	Marshall
18	Jack Doyle	TE	6'6"/253	Western Kentucky
7	Zac Dysert	QB	6'3"/228	Miami (OH)
79	Eric Fisher	OL	6'7"/305	Central Michigan
23	Johnathan Franklin	RB	5'10"/198	UCLA
8	Mike Glennon	QB	6'5"/232	North Carolina State
1	Marquise Goodwin	WR	5'9"/177	Texas
27	Dwayne Gratz	DB	6'0"/198	Connecticut
20	Khaseem Greene	LB	6'1"/230	Rutgers
83	Chris Harper	WR	6'1"/228	Kansas State
97	Jordan Hill	DL	6'1"/292	Penn State
96	Margus Hunt	DL	6'8"/280	Southern Methodist
45	Luke Ingram	LS	6'6"/235	Hawaii
57	Datone Jones	DL	6'4"/275	UCLA
40	Kyle Juszczyk	FB	6'3"/240	Harvard
44	Nick Kasa	TE	6'6"/260	Colorado
18	Jeff Locke	P	6'0"/208	UCLA
74	Kyle Long	OL	6'7"/312	Oregon
70	Joe Madsen	OL	6'4"/305	West Virginia

No.	Name	Position	HT/WT	School
7	T. J. McDonald	DB	6'2"/205	USC
33	Aaron Mellette	WR	6'4"/220	Elon
12	Ryan Nassib	QB	6'2"/228	Syracuse
80	Alex Okafor	DL	6'5"/265	Texas
82	Ryan Otten	TE	6'5"/245	San Jose State
5	Ty Powell	LB	6'2"/245	Harding
14	Jordan Poyer	DB	5'11"/190	Oregon State
67	Justin Pugh	OL	6'5"/297	Syracuse
76	David Quessenberry	OL	6'6"/295	San Jose State
48	Kevin Reddick	LB	6'2"/240	North Carolina
16	Denard Robinson	WR	5'11"/197	Michigan
28	Robbie Rouse	RB	5'7"/190	Fresno State
13	Quinn Sharp	K	6'1"/205	Oklahoma State
93	Kawann Short	DL	6'3"/315	Purdue
54	John Simon	LB	6'2"/263	Ohio State
21	Jamar Taylor	DB	5'11"/196	Boise State
16	Phillip Thomas	DB	6'1"/215	Fresno State
72	Hugh Thornton	OL	6'4"/310	Illinois
6	Desmond Trufant	DB	6'0"/186	Washington
58	Ricky Wagner	OL	6'6"/318	Wisconsin
2	Markus Wheaton	WR	6'0"/182	Oregon State
66	Brandon Williams	DL	6'3"/325	Missouri Southern
4	Duke Williams	DB	6'1"/200	Nevada
92	Sylvester Williams	DL	6'3"/320	North Carolina
46	Trevardo Williams	LB	6'2"/233	Connecticut
66	Brian Winters	OL	6'5"/310	Kent State
15	Blidi Wreh-Wilson	DB	6'1"/190	Connecticut

=== South Team ===
No.	Name	Position	HT/WT	School
72	Oday Aboushi	OL	6'6"/310	Virginia
23	Robert Alford	DB	6'0"/185	Southeastern Louisiana
86	Ryan Allen	P	6'2"/215	Louisiana Tech
47	Ezekiel Ansah	DL	6'5"/270	Brigham Young
24	Marc Anthony	DB	6'0"/200	California
42	Tommy Bohanon	FB	6'2"/245	Wake Forest
8	Jamie Collins	LB	6'1"/228	Southern Mississippi
29	Sanders Commings	DB	6'2"/216	Georgia
93	Everett Dawkins	DL	6'2"/304	Florida State
89	Lavar Edwards	DL	6'5"/258	LSU
23	Andre Ellington†	RB	5'9"/192	Clemson
76	D. J. Fluker	OL	6'6"/335	Alabama
64	Dalton Freeman	OL	6'5"/285	Clemson
65	Garrett Gilkey	OL	6'7"/320	Chadron State
22	Mike Gillislee	RB	5'11"/210	Florida
25	Zaviar Gooden	LB	6'2"/230	Missouri
97	Malliciah Goodman	DL	6'4"/270	Clemson
11	Cobi Hamilton	WR	6'2"/209	Arkansas
18	Dustin Hopkins	K	6'2"/190	Florida State
54	Montori Hughes	DL	6'4"/327	Tennessee-Martin
32	Mike James†	RB	5'11"/229	Miami (FL)
6	John Jenkins	DL	6'3"/358	Georgia
69	Lane Johnson	OL	6'6"/303	Oklahoma
35	Nico Johnson	LB	6'2"/245	Alabama
14	Landry Jones	QB	6'4"/220	Oklahoma
12	Tavarres King	WR	6'1"/200	Georgia

No.	Name	Position	HT/WT	School
37	Robert Lester	DB	6'2"/212	Alabama
3	EJ Manuel	QB	6'4"/240	Florida State
32	Onterio McCalebb	RB/WR	5'11"/173	Auburn
88	Vance McDonald	TE	6'4"/260	Rice
2	Leon McFadden	DB	5'10"/190	San Diego State
73	Xavier Nixon	OL	6'5"/314	Florida
4	Quinton Patton	WR	6'2"/195	Louisiana Tech
10	Sean Porter	LB	6'2"/230	Texas A&M
18	Bacarri Rambo	DB	6'0"/210	Georgia
81	Mychal Rivera	TE	6'3"/244	Tennessee
57	Brian Schwenke	OL	6'4"/300	California
25	Ryan Swope	WR	6'0"/206	Texas A&M
33	Stepfan Taylor	RB	5'11"/215	Stanford
44	Chase Thomas	LB	6'4"/248	Stanford
71	Dallas Thomas	OL	6'5"/310	Tennessee
51	Carson Tinker	LS	6'1"/224	Alabama
74	J. C. Tretter	OL	6'4"/300	Cornell
82	Conner Vernon	WR	6'1"/200	Duke
67	Larry Warford	OL	6'3"/343	Kentucky
83	Cornelius Washington	DL	6'4"/268	Georgia
22	B. W. Webb	DB	5'10"/180	William & Mary
19	J. J. Wilcox	DB	6'0"/215	Georgia Southern
89	Michael Williams	TE	6'5"/272	Alabama
26	Shawn Williams	DB	6'1"/218	Georgia
2	Terrance Williams	WR	6'2"/205	Baylor
1	Vince Williams	LB	6'1"/250	Florida State
8	Tyler Wilson	QB	6'2"/218	Arkansas

† Andre Ellington was injured in practice and did not play; his roster spot was filled by Mike James.

== Game summary ==
=== Scoring summary ===
1st quarter

- South – EJ Manuel 2-yard run (Dustin Hopkins kick)
- South – Michael Williams 20-yard pass from Manuel (Dustin Hopkins kick)

2nd quarter

- none

3rd quarter

- North – Johnathan Franklin 20-yard run (Quinn Sharp kick)
- North – Quinn Sharp 42-yard field goal

4th quarter

- South – Mike James 4-yard run (Dustin Hopkins kick)
- North – Kenjon Barner 2-yard pass from Zac Dysert (Two-point pass conversion failed)

=== Statistics ===
Statistics	North	South
First downs	20	14
Total offense, plays - yards	66–264	63–237
Rushes-yards (net)	24-45	33-105
Passing yards (net)	219	132
Passes, Att-Comp-Int	22-42-2	18-30-1
Time of Possession	29:12	30:48
