= Doug Parrish =

Canadian football player (born 1992)

Profile
- Position: Linebacker

Personal information
- Born: July 24, 1992 (age 34); Edmonton, Alberta, Canada
- Listed height: 6 ft 1 in (1.85 m)
- Listed weight: 225 lb (102 kg)

Career information
- College: Western Oregon
- CFL draft: 2016: 7th round, 61st overall pick

Career history
- 2016–2018: Edmonton Eskimos
- Stats at CFL.ca

Doug Parrish, Jr. (born July 24, 1992) is a Canadian former professional football linebacker who played for the Edmonton Eskimos of the Canadian Football League (CFL).

Parrish attended Sacred Heart Cathedral Preparatory in San Francisco, California. There he played wide receiver, running back, cornerback, safety and outside linebacker. As a senior, caught 41 passes for 755 yards and eight touchdowns and averaged 7.1 yards per rush. He went on to become a first-team All-West Catholic Athletic League and second-team All-Metro pick by the San Francisco Chronicle and his team's Most Valuable Player. He also lettered in basketball before switching his focus.

He attended San Jose State University as a Communications major. He played for the Spartans as a linebacker for the 2010–2012 seasons respectively. Parrish then transferred to Western Oregon University for the 2015 season. He appeared in eight games, totaling 17 tackles with 10 solo and seven assisted. Parrish had a season high of seven tackles in one game against Azusa Pacific. The Eskimos selected Parrish in the seventh round, with the 61st overall selection, of the 2016 CFL draft. His father, Doug Parrish, Sr., also played in the CFL for the Eskimos.

He was released by the Eskimos on August 22, 2018.
