= Kent Baer =

American football player and coach (born 1951)

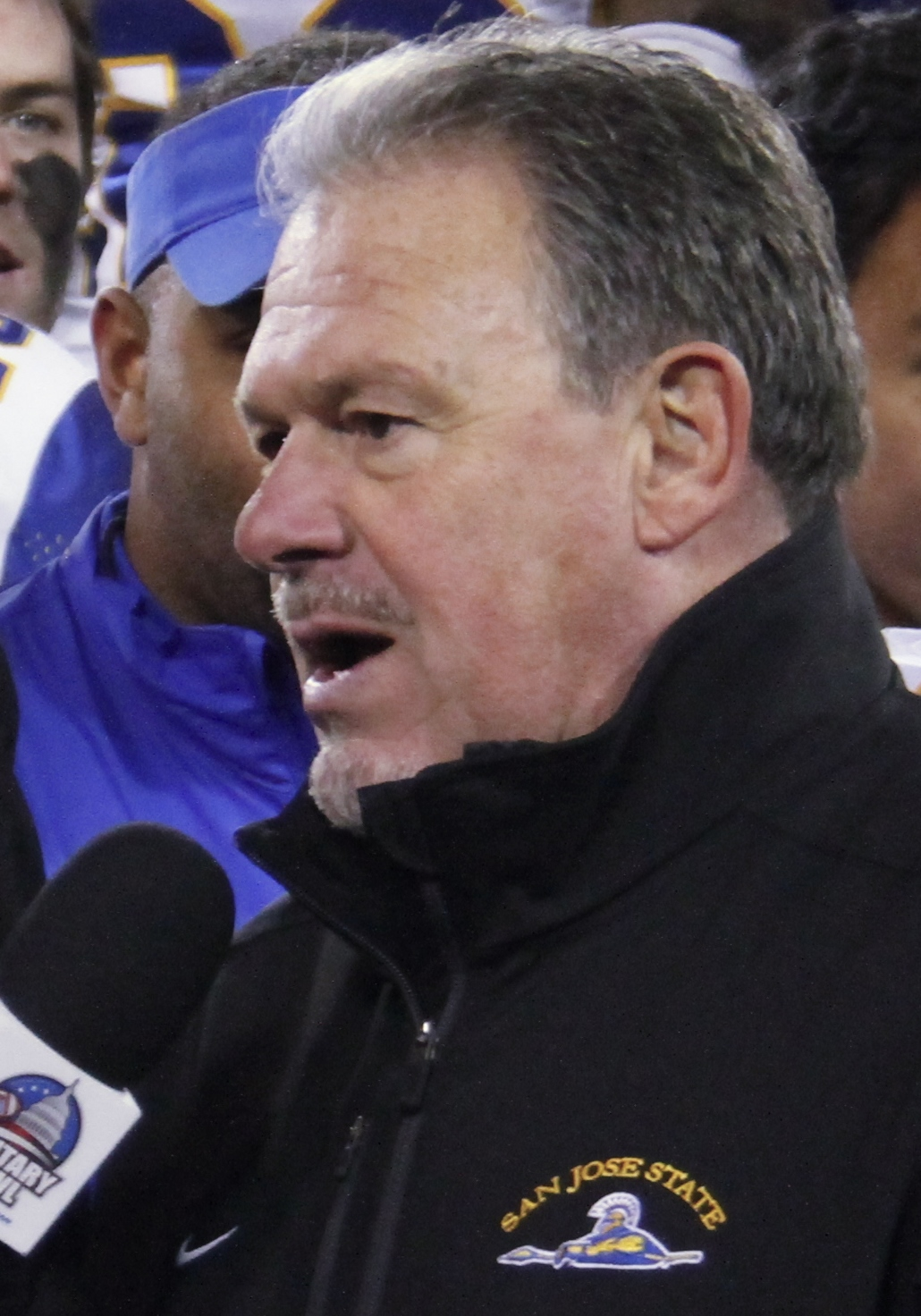
- Baer after the 2012 Military Bowl

Biographical details
- Born: May 2, 1951 (age 75); Logan, Utah, U.S.

Playing career
- 1969–1972: Utah State
- Position: Linebacker

Coaching career (HC unless noted)
- 1973–1976: Yokosuka Seahawks
- 1977–1982: Utah State (OLB)
- 1983–1985: Utah State (DC/DB)
- 1986: Idaho (DC)
- 1987–1991: California (DC)
- 1992–1994: Arizona State (DC)
- 1995–1998: Stanford (LB)
- 1999–2001: Stanford (DC)
- 2002–2004: Notre Dame (DC)
- 2004: Notre Dame (interim HC)
- 2005–2007: Washington (DC)
- 2008–2009: San Jose State (LB)
- 2010–2012: San Jose State (DC/LB)
- 2012: San Jose State (interim HC)
- 2013–2014: Colorado (DC)
- 2015–2017: UNLV (DC/LB)
- 2018–2022: Montana (DC)

Head coaching record
- Overall: 1–1
- Bowls: 1–1

Kent Lex Baer (born May 2, 1951) is an American college football coach. He most recently was the defensive coordinator at the University of Montana, a position he held from 2018 to 2022. Baer served as the interim head football coach at the University of Notre Dame for one game in 2004 and at San Jose State University for one game in 2012.

== Early life and college years ==
Born in Logan, Utah, Baer graduated from Sky View High School of Smithfield, Utah in 1969. Baer then enrolled at Utah State University. At Utah State, Baer lettered in football for four years (1969 through 1972) and graduated with a degree in physical education and recreation.

== Coaching career ==
On December 1, 2004, Notre Dame defensive coordinator Baer was named interim head coach after regular head coach Tyrone Willingham was fired. Notre Dame eventually hired Charlie Weis as new head coach starting 2005. Baer was a 2002 finalist for the Broyles Award, given annually to the nation's top college football assistant coach. However, the Fighting Irish gave up 26.4 points per game in Baer's final 26 games on the coaching staff, from the 12th game of the 2002 season through the end of the 2004 season.

On January 3, 2005, after Willingham became head coach at Washington, Baer joined Willingham's staff as defensive coordinator. At the conclusion of the 2007 season, after a statistically worst defensive season in UW football history, Willingham decided to let Baer go. In the three years at UW, the defense ranked 94, 95 and 98 in total defense, 89, 85 and 94 in scoring defense, and 106, 102 and 85 in passing defense.(1)

On April 14, 2008, Baer became defensive coordinator at San Jose State under Dick Tomey.

On December 11, 2012, Baer became interim head coach of San Jose State after Mike MacIntyre resigned to become head coach at Colorado. Baer coached the Spartans to a 29-20 victory over Bowling Green University in the 2012 Military Bowl on December 27. MacIntyre announced on December 18 that he would like Baer to join him in Colorado as defensive coordinator. With five other former San Jose State assistants, Baer joined MacIntyre in Colorado on January 3, 2013.

First year head coach Tony Sanchez completed his staff at UNLV when Baer joined on December 22, 2014 as his defensive coordinator and linebackers coach. Following the 2017 football season, Baer was relieved of his duties as defensive coordinator and linebackers coach at UNLV, allowing over 31 points per game and over 450 yards to opposing offenses.

== Head coaching record ==
Year	Team	Overall	Conference	Standing	Bowl/playoffs	Coaches^{#}	AP^{°}
Notre Dame Fighting Irish (Independent) (2004)
2004	Notre Dame	0–1 (Note: Tyrone Willingham was fired on November 30. Baer was named interim head coach on December 1 and coached the team in the Insight Bowl.)			L Insight		
Notre Dame:		0–1					
San Jose State Spartans (Western Athletic Conference) (2012)
2012	San Jose State	1–0 (Note: Mike MacIntyre resigned on December 10 to become head coach at Colorado. Baer was named interim head coach on December 11 and coached the team in the Military Bowl.)			W Military	21	21
San Jose State:		1–0					
Total:		1–1					
