= 2012 Military Bowl =

2012 Military Bowl presented by Northrop Grumman
- 5th Military Bowl
San Jose State Spartans	Bowling Green Falcons
(10–2)	(8–4)
WAC	MAC
29	20
Head coach: Kent Baer	Head coach: Dave Clawson
AP / Coaches / BCS; 24 / 24 / 24
	1	2	3	4	Total
San Jose State	7	3	9	10	29
Bowling Green	3	3	14	0	20
- Date: December 27, 2012
- Season: 2012
- Stadium: RFK Stadium
- Location: Washington, D.C.
- MVP: David Fales, QB, SJSU
- Favorite: San Jose State by 7½
- Referee: Mike Cannon (Big Ten)
- Attendance: 17,835

United States TV coverage
- Network: ESPN
- Announcers: Bob Wischusen (play by play); Danny Kanell (analyst); Quint Kessenich (sideline)

The 2012 Military Bowl presented by Northrop Grumman was a post-season American college football bowl game held on December 27, 2012, at Robert F. Kennedy Memorial Stadium in Washington, D.C. The fifth edition of the Military Bowl began at 3:00 p.m. EST and was shown on ESPN. It was between the San Jose State Spartans from the Western Athletic Conference and the Bowling Green Falcons from the Mid-American Conference and was the final game of the 2012 NCAA Division I FBS football season for both teams. The Spartans accepted their invitation after earning a 10–2 record in the regular season, while the Falcons accepted after earning an 8–4 record on theirs.

This was the first Military Bowl appearance as well as the first meeting between these two teams. It was the last edition of the Military Bowl played at RFK Stadium. On May 20, 2013, the bowl announced that future editions would be held at Navy–Marine Corps Memorial Stadium in Annapolis, Maryland.

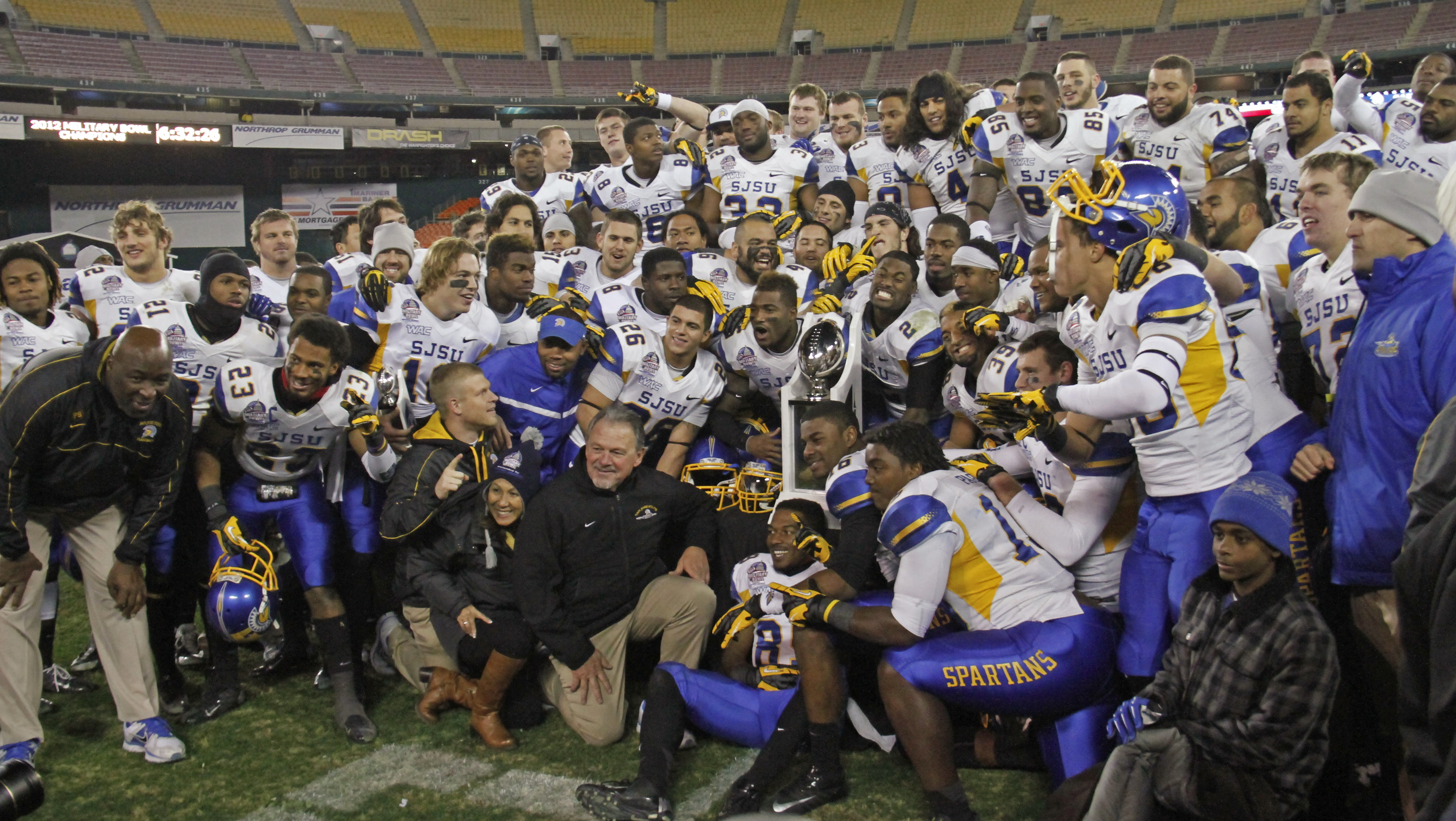
The Spartans pose with the trophy at the 2012 Military Bowl

== Teams ==
Under normal circumstances, the 2012 game would have been between the eighth bowl-eligible team from the Atlantic Coast Conference and Army. However, the Army Black Knights were not bowl eligible because of their 2–9 record. In addition, the ACC only had six bowl-eligible teams this season because the Miami Hurricanes, in the midst of an NCAA investigation into allegations of major rules violations, self-imposed a bowl ban. Therefore, a new matchup for the 2012 game was decided.

=== San Jose State ===
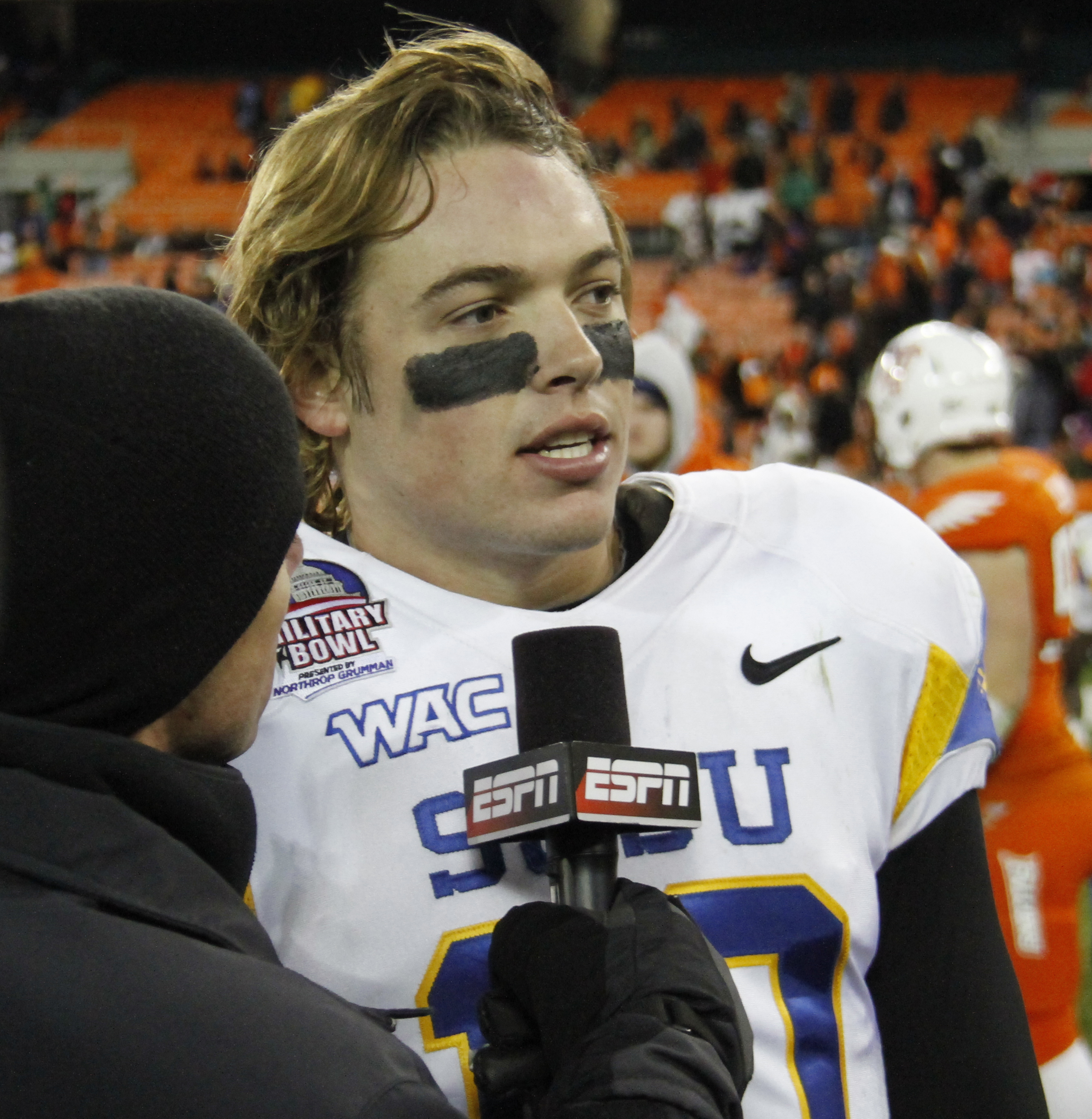
San Jose State quarterback David Fales earned the 2012 Military Bowl MVP title.

After a 1–12 record in 2010 and 5–7 record in 2011, the Spartans finished with a 10–2 overall record and second-place in the Western Athletic Conference (WAC) at 5–1 (their only conference loss coming to the WAC champion Utah State Aggies). After defeating the Louisiana Tech Bulldogs to finish their regular season, the Spartans accepted a bid to the Military Bowl on November 30.

This was the Spartans' final game as a member of the WAC before moving to the Mountain West Conference in 2013. As the WAC stopped sponsoring football after the 2012 season (the conference's 51st in existence), the 2012 Military Bowl was the last football game involving a WAC team.

After leading San Jose State to a 10–2 regular season record, San Jose State head coach Mike MacIntyre resigned from San Jose State on December 10, 2012, to become head coach at Colorado. Defensive coordinator and linebackers coach Kent Baer was named interim head coach for this game only, and San Diego coach Ron Caragher was named as the permanent head coach effective 2013.

=== Bowling Green ===
Bowling Green State University accepted its invitation to the Military Bowl on December 3, after finishing in second place in the Mid-American Conference (MAC) East Division with a 6–2 record.

== Game summary ==
=== First quarter ===
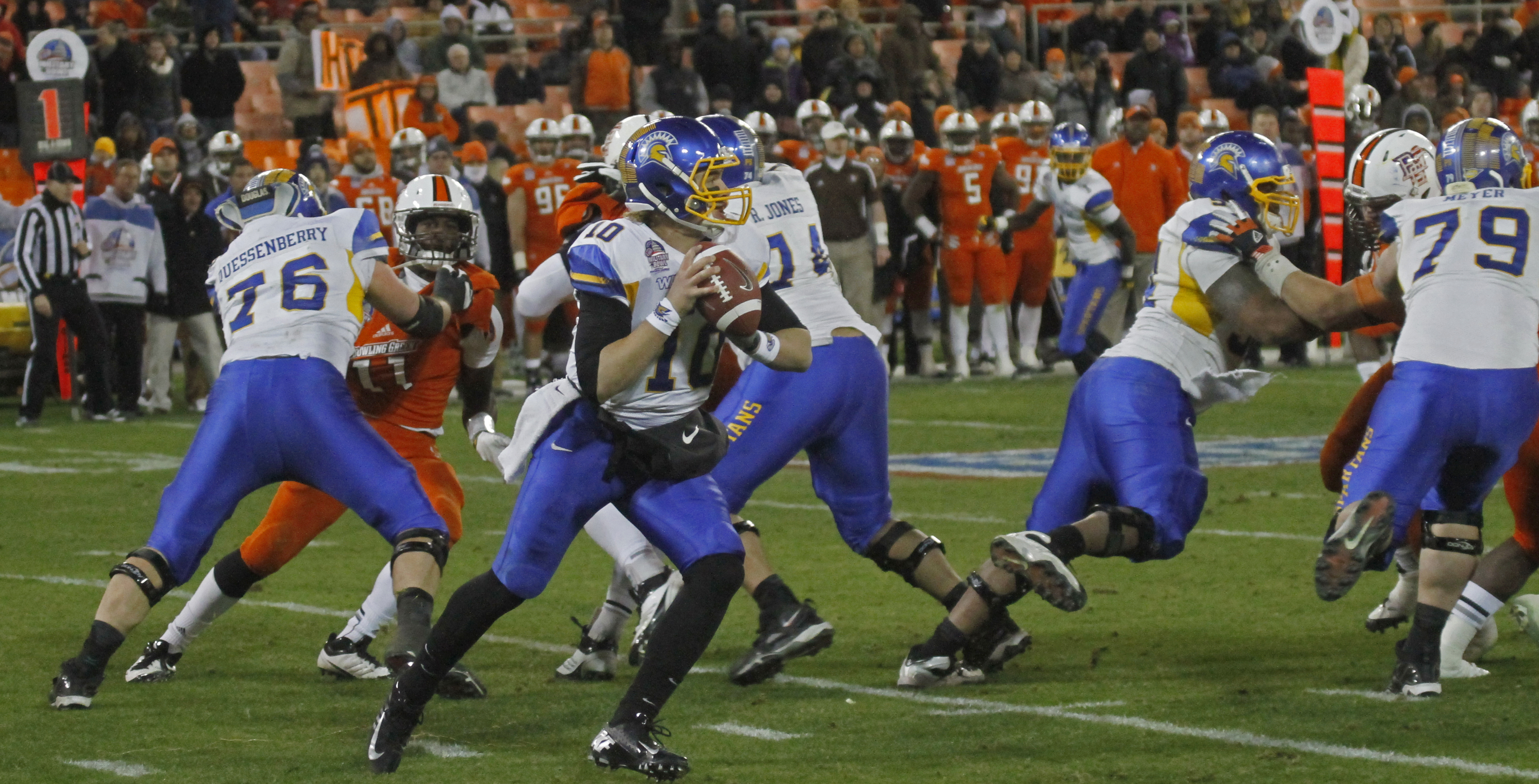
San Jose State's David Fales drops back to pass.

The game began with a 65-yard kickoff from Bowling Green's Anthony Farinella for a touchback. San Jose State quarterback David Fales' first play from scrimmage was a 15-yard pass to Noel Grigsby. However, the first drive ended in a three-and-out after an incomplete pass, rush for no gain, and incomplete pass. Harrison Waid punted the ball 33 yards to Bowling Green's 23 but immediately left the game due to complications of pneumonia.

On Bowling Green's first play from scrimmage, San Jose State committed an encroachment penalty for a five-yard penalty. Running back Anthon Samuel advanced the ball 6 yards for a first down but lost 2 on the next play. Two incomplete passes from Matt Schilz made it another three-and-out. Bowling Green's punt was downed at San Jose State's 21. In a four-play, 79-yard drive that took 1 minute and 45 seconds, De'Leon Eskridge rushed for 3 yards, then David Fales completed three consecutive passes, including a 33-yard touchdown pass to Kyle Nunn. After the extra point, San Jose State led 7–0.

Following an illegal block penalty, 10 yards were taken off BooBoo Gates' kickoff return, and Bowling Green started on their own 29. Matt Schilz completed three consecutive passes of 28, 13, and 9 yards to advance to the SJSU 21. Bowling Green could only advance 12 more yards, and Tyler Tate converted a 28-yard field goal to cut San Jose State's lead to 7–3.

Farinella's kickoff landed out of bounds, so San Jose State started the next drive from their own 35. Following a 2-yard rush from Ina Liaina and 7-yard pass to Jabari Carr came 3rd-and-1 from San Jose State's 44. However, San Jose State was forced to punt because Tyler Ervin rushed for a loss of 6. Placekicker Austin Lopez came in for the injured Waid, but Lopez's first punt was blocked and landed at San Jose State's 24.

=== Second quarter ===
Three rushing plays by Samuel in the first quarter set up a successful 33-yard field goal by Tate to open the second quarter. The score became 7–6 San Jose State, and San Jose State would make only 5 yards on their next possession. Lopez would successfully punt the ball away on fourth down for this and the next San Jose possession. Bowling Green also punted for all three of its second-quarter possessions. After Lopez scored a 36-yard field goal with 1:40 left, the score was 10–6 at halftime.

=== Third quarter ===
BooBoo Gates returned Lopez's kickoff for 32 yards to begin the second half. Bowling Green's Brian Schmiedebusch punted after Bowling Green's drive ended with just 5 yards. Fales completed two passes to advance his team for 15 yards. However, Bowling Green's Charlie Walker sacked Fales and forced a fumble. Bowling Green's Chris Jones recovered the fumble and returned it 20 yards to the San Jose State 8. Bowling Green would get its first lead of the game 13–10 after an Anthon Samuel 8-yard TD run and extra point.

After three drives of both teams ended with punts, San Jose State's Bené Benwikere blocked Schmiedebusch's punt at the Bowling Green 24. The ball rolled out of the end zone for a safety, and

Bowling Green's lead was cut to 13–12 with 5:40 left.

Starting from San Jose State's own 32, Fales made three consecutive complete passes for 18, 7, and 19 yards. After an incomplete pass, De'Leon Eskridge rushed 6 yards for 3rd-and-4 from Bowling Green's 18. From that position, Fales made an 18-yard touchdown pass to Chandler Jones, who caught the ball at the flat and dodged sideline defenders to advance the ball to the end zone.

=== Fourth quarter ===
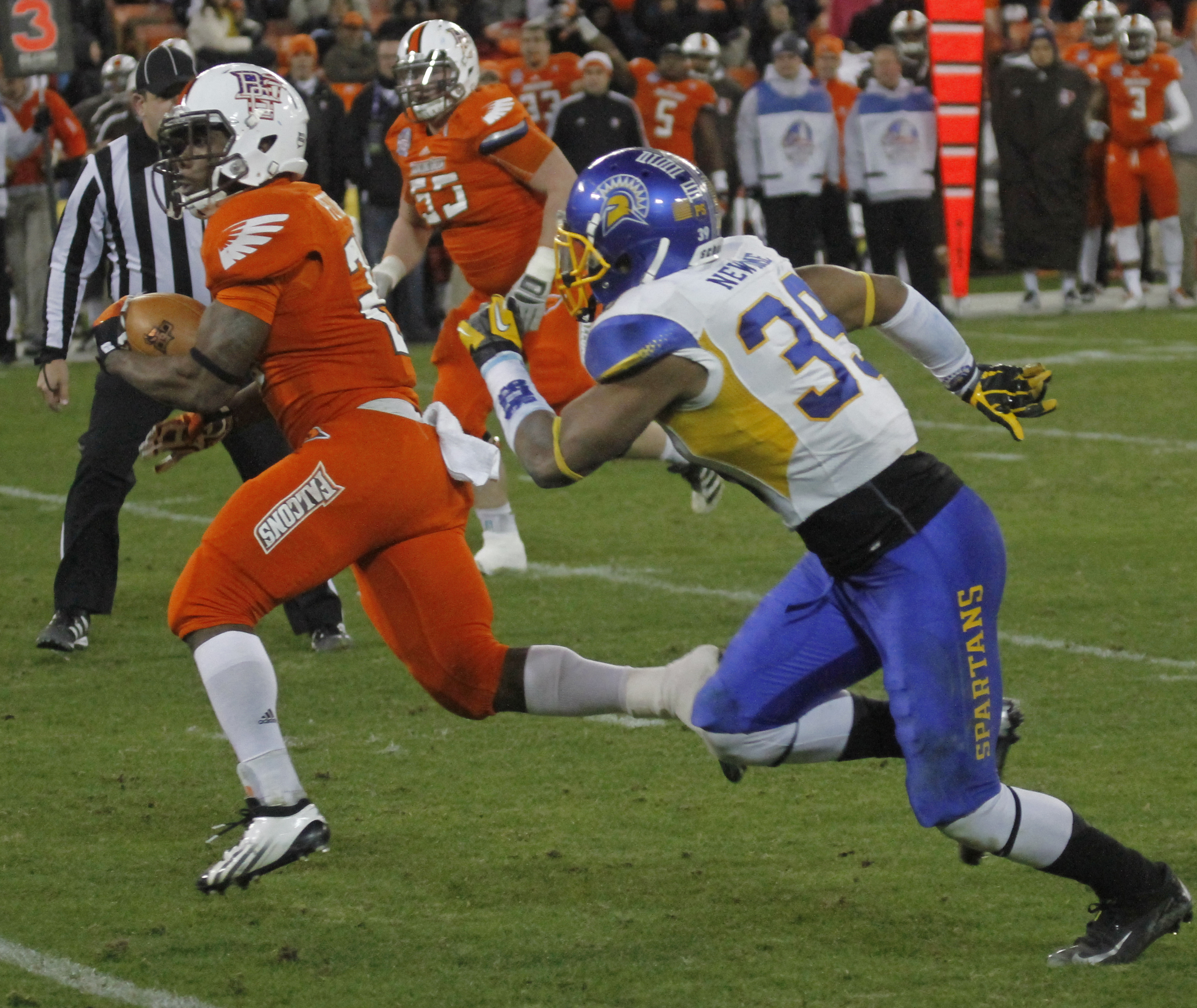
Bowling Green running back John Pettigrew scored in a go-ahead touchdown drive early in the fourth quarter.

Bowling Green got the ball back with 14:14 left after a San Jose State punt. In an 8-play, 68-yard drive with mostly rushing plays, John Pettigrew first converted a 3rd-and-4 with a 34-yard run to advance to San Jose State's one-yard line. Pettigrew followed with a one-yard TD run, and the extra point kick gave the lead back to Bowling Green, 20–19.

With 10:26 left, San Jose State would go on a 13-play, 68-yard drive that took 5:43 off the clock. Lopez converted a 27-yard field goal for San Jose State to take a 22–20 lead. All but one play on this drive were passing plays, save for one botched end-around play by second-string quarterback Blake Jurich to running back Kyle Nunn from Bowling Green's 10. Jurich recovered at the 22 for a loss of 12.

Bowling Green's Pettigrew made an 18-yard kickoff return to the Bowling Green 23. Schilz's first pass from scrimmage was incomplete, and San Jose State defensive end Travis Johnson sacked Schilz on the next play and forced a fumble. San Jose State linebacker Keith Smith recovered the fumble at the 24-yard line. Taking over with 4:22 left, Eskridge rushed twice for 9 yards to the Bowling Green 15, and on 3rd-and-1, Fales completed a 12-yard pass to Ina Liaina. After a 2-yard rush, Eskridge rushed 1 yard for a touchdown. San Jose State led 29–20 after the extra point, and with 2:34 left, a win was inevitable.

Bowling Green's final drive was marred by a 15-yard unsportsmanlike conduct penalty that forced a 3rd-and-25. Schilz's pass only went 22 yards, and on 4th-and-3, Schilz's pass was deflected by Travis Raciti. San Jose State ran out the last 1:51 to seal the 29–20 victory.

=== Scoring summary ===
Scoring summary

Quarter	Time	Drive			Team	Scoring information	Score	
Quarter	Time	Plays	Yards	TOP	Team	Scoring information	San Jose State	Bowling Green
1	10:05	4	79	1:45	SJSU	Kyle Nunn 33-yard touchdown reception from David Fales, Austin Lopez kick good	7	0
1	3:37	11	62	6:08	BGSU	28-yard field goal by Tyler Tate	7	3
2	14:55	4	9	2:05	BGSU	33-yard field goal by Tyler Tate	7	6
2	1:40	4	54	2:56	SJSU	36-yard field goal by Austin Lopez	10	6
3	12:05	1	8	0:05	BGSU	Anthon Samuel 8-yard touchdown run, Stephen Stein kick good	10	13
3	4:18	-	-	-	SJSU	BGSU punt blocked by Bene Benwikere into the back of the end zone resulting in a safety.	12	13
3	2:16	6	68	2:09	SJSU	Chandler Jones 17-yard touchdown reception from David Fales, Austin Lopez kick good	19	13
4	10:26	8	68	3:48	BGSU	John Pettigrew 1-yard touchdown run, Stephen Stein kick good	19	20
4	4:43	13	68	5:43	SJSU	27-yard field goal by Austin Lopez	22	20
4	2:34	5	24	1:48	SJSU	De'Leon Eskridge 1-yard touchdown run, Austin Lopez kick good	29	20
"TOP" = time of possession. For other American football terms, see Glossary of American football.							29	20

=== Statistics ===
Statistics	San Jose State	Bowling Green
First downs	19	12
Total offense, plays - yards	66-380	65-264
Rushes-yards (net)	23-−15	30–105
Passing yards (net)	395	159
Passes, Comp-Att-Int	33-43-0	16–35–0
Time of Possession	30:48	29:12

== Starting line-ups ==
San Jose State	Position	Position	Bowling Green
OFFENSE
Jabari Carr	WR		Shaun Joplin
David Quessenberry	LT		Fahn Cooper
Ryan Jones	LG		Dominic Flewellyn
Reuben Hasani	C		Chief Kekuewa
Nicholas Kaspar	RG		Alex Huettel
Jon Meyer	RT		Jordon Roussos
Peter Tuitupou	TE		Alex Bayer
David Fales	QB		Matt Schilz
Ina Liaina	RB	FB	Tyler Beck
De'Leon Eskridge	RB	TB	Anthon Samuel
Noel Grigsby	WR		Chris Gallon
DEFENSE
David Tuitupou	DE		Bryan Thomas
Foloi Vae	DT		Chris Jones
Travis Raciti	DT	NT	Ted Ouellet
Travis Johnson	DE	LB	Charlie Walker
Vince Buhagiar	LB	ILB	Paul Swan
Keith Smith	LB	MLB	Dwayne Woods
Bené Benwikere	S	LB	Gabe Martin
Cullen Newsome	S	CB	Darrell Hunter
James Orth	S	DB	Ryland Ward
Ronnie Yell	CB	DB	BooBoo Gates
Jimmy Pruitt	CB		Cameron Truss

== Notes ==
- The reported attendance of 17,835 was the lowest bowl attendance figure since the 2005 Hawaii Bowl had only 16,134 attendees.
- Two players who played in this game were selected in the 2013 NFL draft:
  - David Quessenberry, San Jose State offensive tackle, was selected in the sixth round, 176th overall by the Houston Texans, and
  - Chris Jones, Bowling Green defensive tackle, was selected in the sixth round, 186th overall by the Houston Texans.
- Two players were also selected in the 2014 NFL draft:
  - Bené Benwikere, San Jose State cornerback, was selected in the fifth round, 148th overall by the Carolina Panthers, and
  - David Fales, San Jose State quarterback, was selected in the sixth round, 183rd overall by the Chicago Bears.
