= Ron Caragher =

American football coach (born 1967)

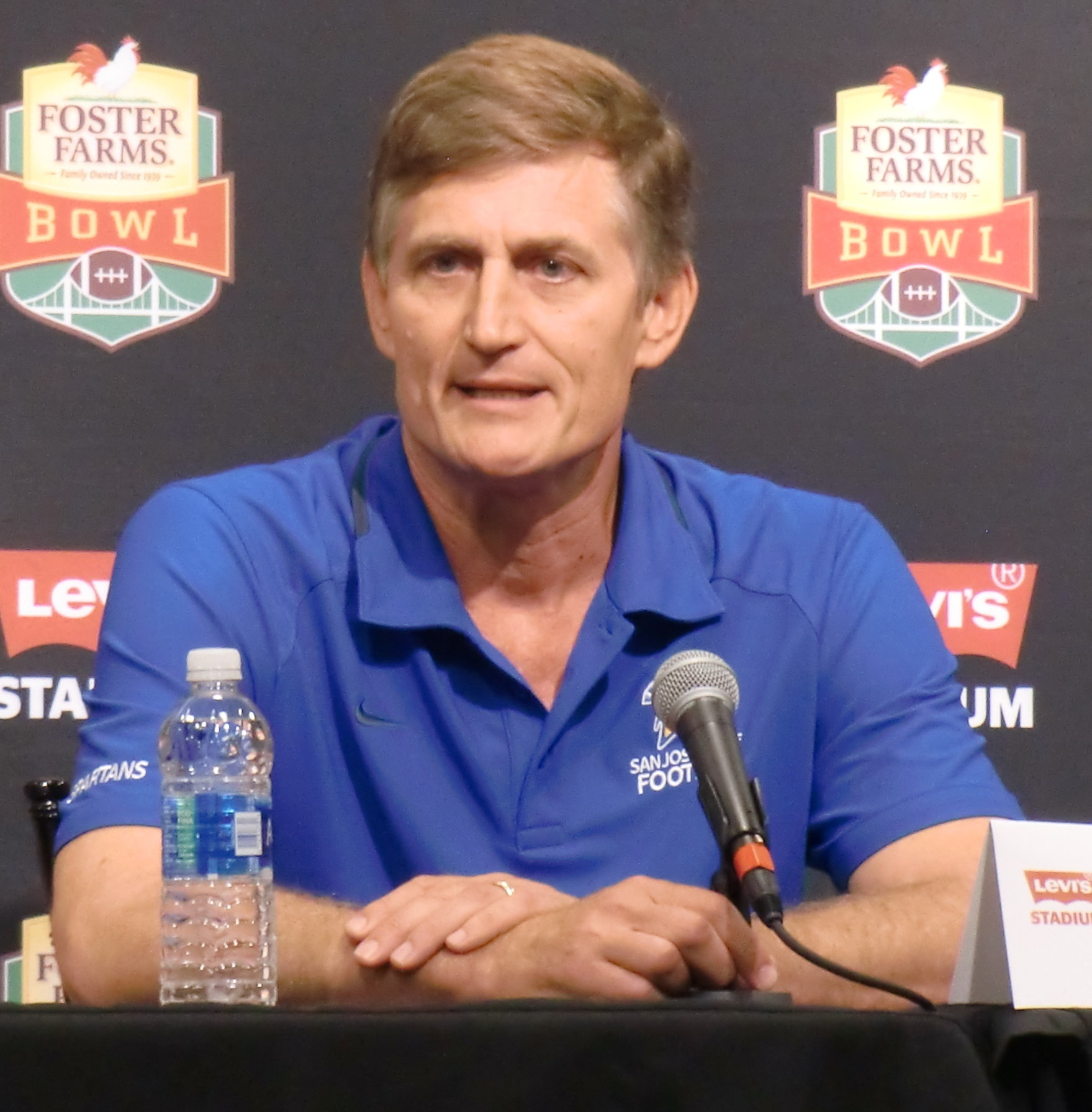
- Caragher at 2016 Bay Area College Football Media Day

Biographical details
- Born: January 24, 1967 (age 59); Redwood City, California, U.S.

Playing career
- 1986–1989: UCLA
- Position: Quarterback

Coaching career (HC unless noted)
- 1994–1995: UCLA (GA)
- 1996–2002: UCLA (WR/P/K)
- 2003–2004: Kentucky (RB)
- 2005–2006: Kentucky (RB/RC)
- 2007–2012: San Diego
- 2013–2016: San Jose State
- 2018: San Diego State (OCRC)
- 2019: San Diego State (TE/PCG)
- 2024–present: St. Augustine High School (San Diego)

Administrative career (AD unless noted)
- 2020–2021: San Diego (asst. AD, development)

Head coaching record
- Overall: 63–52
- Bowls: 1–0

Accomplishments and honors

Championships
- 3× PFL (2007, 2011, 2012)

Awards
- PFL Coach of the Year (2011)

Ronald Allen Caragher (born January 24, 1967) is an American former college football coach. He was previously the head coach at the University of San Diego and San Jose State. Originally from Morgan Hill, California, Caragher played college football at UCLA and later became an assistant coach for UCLA football, first as a graduate assistant from 1994 to 1995, then as wide receivers coach from 1996 to 2002. From 2003 to 2006, Caragher served as running backs coach for Kentucky and was part of the 2006 Music City Bowl championship coaching staff.

Caragher first became a head coach at the University of San Diego in 2007 and remained in that position until 2012. During his tenure there, San Diego won three Pioneer Football League championships. From 2013 to 2016, Caragher was head coach at San Jose State. Although he inherited a top-25 team, he was unable to achieve a winning record in four seasons. After leaving San Jose State, Caragher was an assistant coach at San Diego State in 2018 and 2019. From 2020 to 2022, Caragher returned to the University of San Diego as an assistant athletics director. Beginning in 2024, Caragher was head football coach of St. Augustine High School in San Diego.

== Early life and education ==
Born in Redwood City, California, Caragher grew up with his mother in Morgan Hill after his parents divorced. Caragher played on the local Pop Warner football team and switched from running back to quarterback at age 12. Reflecting on his upbringing, Caragher said: "In a single-parent home, I was very influenced by coaches. I was very blessed to have male coaches in my life that were good guides for me, because I could've gone different directions." Attending Bellarmine College Preparatory in San Jose, Caragher lettered in three sports including football and graduated in 1985.

Caragher received an athletic scholarship to the University of California, Los Angeles (UCLA) in 1985. At UCLA, Caragher redshirted his freshman year, then was backup quarterback from 1986 to 1989, including two seasons behind Troy Aikman. Caragher was part of the UCLA teams that won the 1986 Freedom Bowl, 1987 Aloha Bowl, and 1989 Cotton Bowl Classic.

In UCLA's 52–17 win on November 7, 1987, over Oregon State, Caragher was one of three backup quarterbacks who substituted for Aikman during garbage time. As a junior in 1988, Caragher completed 4 of 7 passes for 19 yards, 1 touchdown, and 2 interceptions. With UCLA leading Arizona (24–0) late in the fourth quarter on October 22, Caragher came in to replace Aikman but threw an interception that led to an Arizona field goal; UCLA would ultimately win 24–3. In the 1989 Cotton Bowl, senior Caragher took over on one handoff play after Aikman lost a contact lens. In 1990, Caragher graduated from UCLA with a Bachelor of Arts degree in psychology. Caragher became a pension administrator after finishing his bachelor's degree.

== Coaching career ==
=== Assistant coach (1994–2006) ===
While studying for his master's degree in 1994, Caragher became a graduate assistant with UCLA football. In 1995, Caragher earned his master's degree in educational administration from UCLA. In 1996, Caragher became coach for wide receivers, punters, and kickers, a position he would hold until 2002. Caragher coached UCLA through five bowl games. UCLA had a record 20-game winning streak from 1997 to 1998. With Pac-10 titles in 1997 and 1998, UCLA also won the 1998 Cotton Bowl Classic (following the 1997 season) and 2002 Las Vegas Bowl.

From 2003 to 2006, Caragher was running backs coach at Kentucky and was recruiting coordinator from 2005 to 2006. Kentucky's 8-5 2006 season was the school's best record since 1984, and Kentucky's 2006 Music City Bowl victory marked its first bowl game since 1999 and first bowl win since 1984.

=== San Diego (2007–2012) ===
Succeeding Jim Harbaugh, Caragher became head coach at Football Championship Subdivision school University of San Diego in 2007. Under Caragher, San Diego won three Pioneer Football League (PFL) titles: in 2007, 2011, and 2012. The Pioneer Football League named Caragher Coach of the Year following a 9–2 season in 2011, the team's third season with such a record under Caragher. At San Diego, Caragher coached quarterback Josh Johnson, who was selected in the fifth round of the 2008 NFL draft.

=== San Jose State (2013–2016) ===
Signing a five-year contract, Caragher accepted the head coach position at San Jose State on December 17, 2012, a week after previous head coach Mike MacIntyre resigned to become head coach at Colorado. Caragher coached his first game in the 2013 season after Kent Baer served as interim head coach for the 2012 Military Bowl on December 27, 2012. During the 2013 spring practice period, Caragher changed the defensive line alignment from a 4–3 to a 3–4 defense and put quarterback David Fales under center rather than the pistol offense.

Following an 11–2 season in 2012, San Jose State went 6–6 (5–3 in Mountain West play) in Caragher's first season as head coach and the program's first year in the MW and ended the season with a 62–52 upset win over AP #16 Fresno State. San Jose State fell to 3–9 in 2014. The season included a quarterback controversy that extended into the season, when Caragher changed the starting quarterback from Blake Jurich to Joe Gray after the third game.

In 2015, San Jose State improved to 6–7, including a win in the Cure Bowl. Despite a 5–7 regular season record, San Jose State was bowl-eligible due to a lack of 6–6 or better teams for all available bowl game spots. However, the team dropped to 4–8 in 2016, and Caragher was fired on November 27, the day after San Jose State beat rival Fresno State in the season finale.

=== San Diego State assistant (2018–2019) ===
In 2018, Caragher became offensive quality control coach and on-campus recruiting coordinator at San Diego State under Rocky Long. Caragher was promoted to tight ends coach and passing game coordinator in 2019. The 2019 San Diego State team finished 10–3 (5–3 Mountain West) and won the 2019 New Mexico Bowl. Long retired after the season, and new head coach Brady Hoke did not retain Caragher.

=== Athletics administration and return to high school (2020–present) ===
From 2020 to 2022, Caragher had another job with the University of San Diego, this time as a fundraising assistant.

In 2024, Caragher became the head varsity football coach and a physical education teacher at St. Augustine High School in San Diego.

== Head coaching record ==
Year	Team	Overall	Conference	Standing	Bowl/playoffs
San Diego Toreros (Pioneer Football League) (2007–2012)
2007	San Diego	9–2	6–1	T–1st	
2008	San Diego	9–2	6–2	T–2nd	
2009	San Diego	4–7	3–5	T–6th	
2010	San Diego	5–6	5–3	4th	
2011	San Diego	9–2	7–1	T–1st	
2012	San Diego	8–3	7–1	T–1st	
San Diego:		44–22	34–13		
San Jose State Spartans (Mountain West Conference) (2013–2016)
2013	San Jose State	6–6	5–3	T–3rd (West)	
2014	San Jose State	3–9	2–6	5th (West)	
2015	San Jose State	6–7	4–4	T–2nd (West)	W Cure
2016	San Jose State	4–8	3–5	T–3rd (West)	
San Jose State:		19–30	14–18		
Total:		63–52			
National championship Conference title Conference division title or championship game berth
