= List of Auburn Tigers head football coaches =

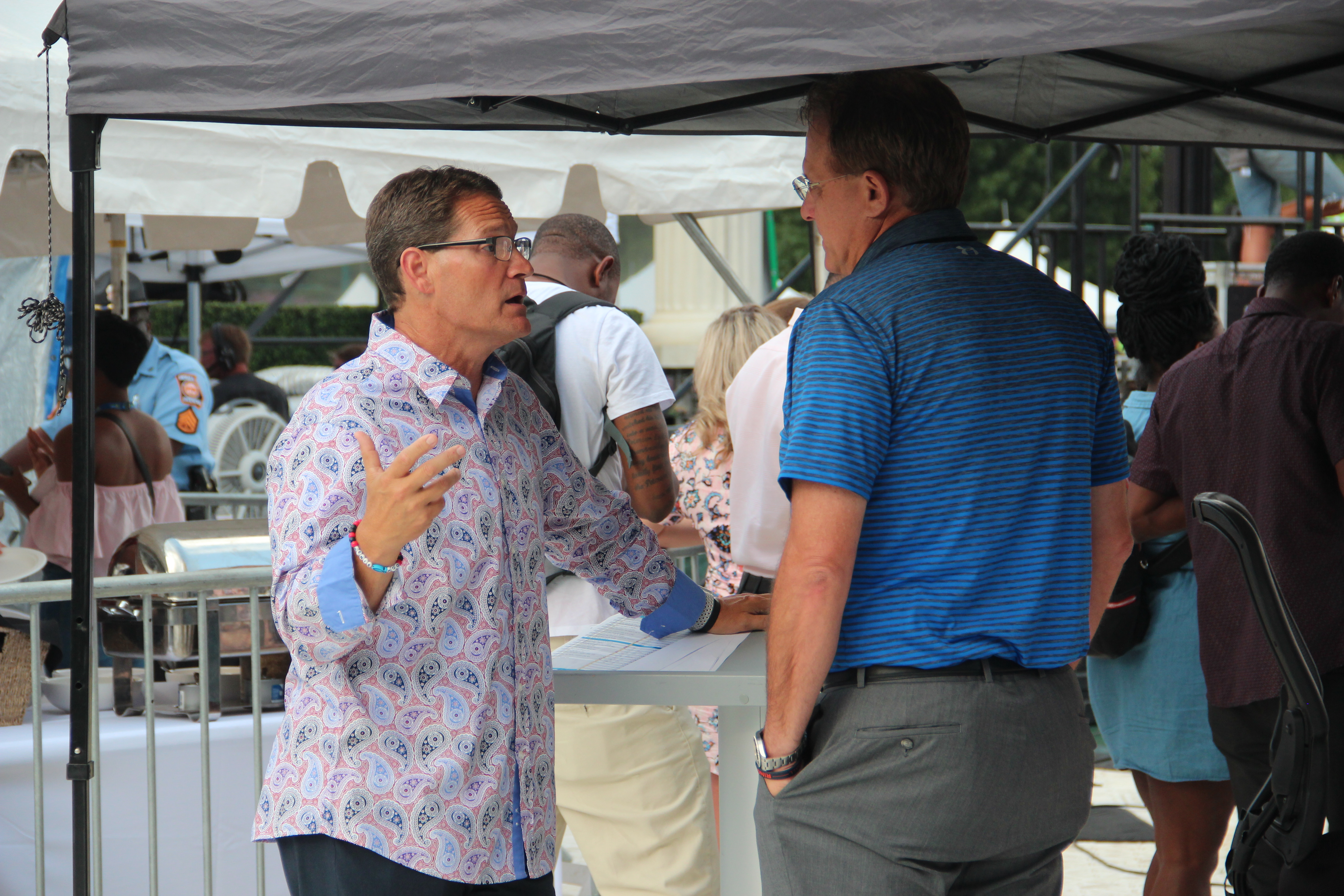
Gene Chizik (left) and Gus Malzahn (right)

The Auburn Tigers college football team represents Auburn University in the Southeastern Conference (SEC). The Tigers compete as part of the NCAA Division I Football Bowl Subdivision. The program has had 30 head coaches, and 4 interim head coaches, since it began play during the 1892 season. The Tigers current head coach is Alex Golesh.

The team has played more than 1,300 games over 133 seasons. In that time, nine coaches have led the Tigers in postseason bowl games: Jack Meagher, Ralph Jordan, Pat Dye, Terry Bowden, Tommy Tuberville, Gene Chizik, Gus Malzahn, Bryan Harsin, and Hugh Freeze. Seven coaches won conference championships: Walter H. Watkins and Mike Donahue won a combined three as a member of the Southern Intercollegiate Athletic Association; Chet A. Wynne won one as a member of the Southern Conference; and Jordan, Dye, Tuberville, Chizik, and Malzahn won a combined eight as a member of the SEC. During their tenures, Jordan and Chizik each won a national championship with the Tigers.

Jordan is the leader in seasons coached and games won, with 176 victories during his 25 years with the program. M. S. Harvey and Johnny Floyd have the lowest winning percentage of those who have coached more than one game, with .000. Of the 26 different head coaches who have led the Tigers, John Heisman, Donahue, Jordan and Dye have been inducted as head coaches into the College Football Hall of Fame.

== Key ==
Key to symbols in coaches list
General		Overall		Conference		Postseason (Note: Although the first Rose Bowl Game was played in 1902, it has been continuously played since the 1916 game, and is recognized as the oldest bowl game by the NCAA. "—" indicates any season prior to 1916 when postseason games were not played.)	
No.	Order of coaches (Note: A running total of the number of head coaches, with coaches who served separate tenures being counted only once. Interim head coaches are represented with "Int" and are not counted in the running total. "—" indicates the team played but either without a coach or no coach is on record. "X" indicates an interim year without play.)	GC	Games coached	CW	Conference wins	PW	Postseason wins
DC	Division championships	OW	Overall wins	CL	Conference losses	PL	Postseason losses
CC	Conference championships	OL	Overall losses	CT	Conference ties	PT	Postseason ties
NC	National championships	OT	Overall ties (Note: Overtime rules in college football were introduced in 1996, making ties impossible in the period since.)	C%	Conference winning percentage		
†	Elected to the College Football Hall of Fame	O%	Overall winning percentage (Note: When computing the win–loss percentage, a tie counts as half a win and half a loss.)				

== Coaches ==
List of head football coaches showing various statistics and awards (Note: Statistics correct as of the end of the 2025 NCAA Division I FBS football season.)
No.	Name	Year(s) (Note: Auburn did not field a team for the 1943 season due to World War II.)	Season(s)	GC	OW	OL	OT	O%	CW	CL	CT	C%	PW	PL	PT	DC (Note: Beginning with the institution of SEC divisional play in 1992, divisional champions advanced to the SEC Championship Game. Auburn competed as a member of the defunct SEC West. The SEC eliminated divisions with the start of the 2024 season.)	CC	NC	Awards
1	George Petrie	1892	1	4	2	2	0	0.500	—	—	—	—	—	—	—	—	—	0	—
2	D. M. Balliet	1893	1	1	1	0	0	1.000	—	—	—	—	—	—	—	—	—	0	—
3	George Roy Harvey	1893	1	4	2	0	2	0.750	—	—	—	—	—	—	—	—	—	0	—
4	Forrest M. Hall	1894	1	4	1	3	0	0.250	—	—	—	—	—	—	—	—	—	0	—
5	John Heisman^{†}	1895–1899	5	18	12	4	2	0.722	8	4	2	0.643	—	—	—	—	0	0	—
6	Walter H. Watkins	1900	1	10	6	3	1	0.650	5	2	1	0.688	—	—	—	—	1	0	—
7	William M. Williams	1901	1	10	4	5	1	0.450	2	2	1	0.500	—	—	—	—	0	0	—
8	Ralph S. Kent	1902	1	5	2	2	1	0.500	2	2	1	0.500	—	—	—	—	0	0	—
9	M. S. Harvey	1902	1	2	0	2	0	.000	0	2	0	.000	—	—	—	—	0	0	—
10	William Penn Bates	1903	1	7	4	3	0	0.571	2	3	0	0.400	—	—	—	—	0	0	—
11	Mike Donahue^{†}	1904–1906; 1908–1922	3, 15	146	106	35	5	0.743	65	26	3	0.707	0	0	0	—	2	3 (1910, 1913, 1914)	—
12	Willis Kienholz	1907	1	9	6	2	1	0.722	3	2	1	0.583	—	—	—	—	0	0	—
13	Boozer Pitts	1923–1924; 1927	2, 1	24	7	11	6	0.417	2	9	5	0.281	0	0	0	—	0	0	—
14	Dave Morey	1925–1927	3	21	10	10	1	0.500	6	7	1	0.464	0	0	0	—	0	0	—
15	George Bohler	1928–1929	2	14	3	11	0	0.214	0	10	0	.000	0	0	0	—	0	0	—
16	Johnny Floyd	1929	1	4	0	4	0	.000	0	4	0	.000	0	0	0	—	0	0	—
17	Chet A. Wynne	1930–1933	4	39	22	15	2	0.590	12	11	1	0.521	0	0	0	—	1	0	—
18	Jack Meagher	1934–1942	9	95	48	37	10	0.558	26	25	7	0.509	1	0	1	—	0	0	SEC Coach of the Year (1935)
19	Carl M. Voyles	1944–1947	4	37	15	22	0	0.405	4	17	0	0.190	0	0	0	—	0	0	—
20	Earl Brown	1948–1950	3	29	3	22	4	0.172	2	18	2	0.136	0	0	0	—	0	0	—
21	Ralph Jordan^{†}	1951–1975	25	265	176	83	6	0.675	98	65	4	0.599	5	7	0	—	1	2 (1957, 1958)	AP SEC Coach of the Year (1953, 1957, 1972); UPI SEC Coach of the Year (1963, 1972); SEC Coach of the Year (1953, 1963, 1972)
22	Doug Barfield	1976–1980	5	55	29	25	1	0.536	15	14	1	0.517	0	0	0	—	0	0	—
23	Pat Dye^{†}	1981–1992	12	142	99	39	4	0.703	48	27	3	0.635	6	2	1	0	4	1 (1983)	AP SEC Coach of the Year (1987, 1988); UPI SEC Coach of the Year (1983, 1988); SEC Coach of the Year (1983, 1987, 1988)
24	Terry Bowden (Note: Terry Bowden finished the 1998 season with a record of one win and five losses prior to his resignation as head coach on October 23, 1998. Bill Oliver served as interim head coach for the final five games of the season, finishing with two wins and three losses.)	1993–1998	6	65	47	17	1	0.731	30	14	1	0.678	2	1	0	1	0	1 (1993)	FWAA Coach of the Year (1993); George Munger Award (1993); Paul "Bear" Bryant Award (1993); Walter Camp Coach of the Year (1993); AP SEC Coach of the Year (1993)
Interim	Bill Oliver	1998	1	5	2	3	—	0.400	0	3	—	.000	0	0	—	0	0	0	—
25	Tommy Tuberville	1999–2008	10	125	85	40	—	0.680	51	29	—	0.638	5	3	—	5	1	1 (2004)	AFCA Coach of the Year (2004); Paul "Bear" Bryant Award (2004); Walter Camp Coach of the Year (2004); AP Coach of the Year (2004); AP SEC Coach of the Year (2004)
26	Gene Chizik	2009–2012	4	52	33	19	—	0.635	15	17	—	0.469	3	0	—	1	1	1 (2010)	Home Depot Coach of the Year (2010); Liberty Mutual Coach of the Year Award (2010); Paul "Bear" Bryant Award (2010); Bobby Bowden National Collegiate Coach of the Year Award (2010); AP SEC Coach of the Year (2010)
27	Gus Malzahn (Note: On December 13, 2020, Malzahn was fired as head coach of Auburn at the conclusion of his eighth season. Defensive coordinator Kevin Steele served as interim head coach for Auburn's Citrus Bowl loss.)	2013–2020	8	103	68	35	—	0.660	39	27	—	0.591	2	5	—	2	1	0	Liberty Mutual Coach of the Year Award (2013); Paul "Bear" Bryant Award (2013); Associated Press College Football Coach of the Year Award (2013); Eddie Robinson Coach of the Year Award (2013); Sporting News College Football Coach of the Year (2013); Home Depot Coach of the Year Award (2013); SEC Coach of the Year (2013)
Interim	Kevin Steele	2020	1	1	0	1	—	.000	—	—	—	—	0	1	—	0	0	0	—
28	Bryan Harsin (Note: Bryan Harsin was fired as Auburn's head coach on Monday, October 31, 2022. Running backs coach Cadillac Williams served as interim head coach for Auburn's remaining four regular season games.)	2021–2022	2	21	9	12	—	0.429	4	9	—	0.308	0	1	—	0	0	0	—
Interim	Cadillac Williams	2022	1	4	2	2	—	0.500	1	2	—	0.333	0	0	—	0	0	0	—
29	Hugh Freeze	2023–2025	3	34	15	19	—	0.441	6	16	—	0.273	0	1	—	0	0	0	—
Interim	D. J. Durkin	2025	1	3	1	2	—	0.333	0	2	—	.000	0	0	—	—	0	0	—
30	Alex Golesh	2026	1	11	7	4	—	0.636	4	4	—	0.500	0	0	—	—	0	0	—
