= 2011 Auburn Tigers football team =

American college football season

2011 Auburn Tigers football

Chick-fil-A Bowl champion

Chick-fil-A Bowl, W 43–24 vs. Virginia
- Conference: Southeastern Conference
- Western Division
- Record: 8–5 (4–4 SEC)
- Head coach: Gene Chizik (3rd season)
- Offensive coordinator: Gus Malzahn (3rd season)
- Offensive scheme: Spread
- Defensive coordinator: Ted Roof (3rd season)
- Base defense: 4–3, Tampa 2
- Home stadium: Jordan–Hare Stadium

2011 Southeastern Conference football standings
	Conf.			Overall
Team	W		L	W		L
Eastern Division
No. 19 Georgia x	7	–	1	10	–	4
No. 9 South Carolina	6	–	2	11	–	2
Florida	3	–	5	7	–	6
Vanderbilt	2	–	6	6	–	7
Kentucky	2	–	6	5	–	7
Tennessee	1	–	7	5	–	7
Western Division
No. 2 LSU x$	8	–	0	13	–	1
No. 1 Alabama %#	7	–	1	12	–	1
No. 5 Arkansas	6	–	2	11	–	2
Auburn	4	–	4	8	–	5
Mississippi State	2	–	6	7	–	6
Ole Miss*	0	–	8	2	–	10
Championship: LSU 42, Georgia 10
# – BCS National Champion; $ – BCS representative as conference champion; % – BCS at-large representative; x – Division champion/co-champions; * Ole Miss vacated all wins due to NCAA violations.; Rankings from AP Poll

The 2011 Auburn Tigers football team represented Auburn University in the 2011 NCAA Division I FBS football season. The team was coached by Gene Chizik, who was in his third season with Auburn. The Tigers played their home games at Jordan–Hare Stadium in Auburn, Alabama, and competed in the Western Division of the Southeastern Conference (SEC). The Tigers entered the 2011 season after winning the 2011 BCS National Championship. Auburn finished the year 8–5 overall and 4–4 in SEC play to place fourth in the Western Division. They were invited to the Chick-fil-A Bowl, where they defeated Virginia, 43–24.

== Coaching staff ==
2010 Auburn Tigers coaching staff
Head coaches: Head coach – Gene Chizik; Ass. HC for Offense/OC/QB – Gus Malzahn; Ass. HC/WR – Trooper Taylor; Offensive coaches: Offensive line: Jeff Grimes; Running backs/Recruiting Coordinator: Curtis Luper; Quality Control: Casey Woods; Defensive coaches: Defensive coordinator/Linebackers: Ted Roof; Defensive Line: Mike Pelton; Cornerbacks: Phillip Lolley; Safeties: Tommy Thigpen	Special teams: Special teams coordinator/tight ends – Jay Boulware; Supporting Strength and Conditioning coach: S&C Support - Kevin Yoxall

=== Returning starters ===
==== Offense ====
Player	Class	Position
Onterrio McCallebb	Junior	Running Back
Emory Blake	Junior	Wide Receiver
Philip Lutzenkirchen	Junior	HB/TE/WR
Brandon Mosely	Senior	Right Tackle

==== Defense ====
Player	Class	Position
Nosa Eguae	Soph	Right End
Daren Bates	Junior	Left Outside Linebacker
T'Sharvin Bell	Junior	Left Cornerback
Neiko Thorpe	Senior	Safety

==== Special teams ====
Player	Class	Position
Josh Harris	Junior	Long Snapper

=== Key losses ===
- QB Cam Newton
- RB Mario Fannin
- WR Darvin Adams
- WR Terell Zachery
- WR Kodi Burns
- LT Lee Ziemba
- LG Mike Berry
- C Ryan Pugh
- RG Byron Isom
- DE Antoine Carter
- DE Micheal Goggans
- NG Zach Clayton
- NT Nick Fairley
- NT Mike Blanc
- LB Josh Bynes
- LB Craig Stevens
- CB Demond Washington
- K Wes Byrum
- P Ryan Shoemaker

Dismissed from team

- HB Eric Smith
- WR Antonio Goodwin
- WR Shaun Kitchens
- TE Dakota Mosely
- SS Mike McNeil

Quit team during spring

- WR Derek Winters
- WR Philip Pierre Louis
- TE Robert Cooper
- OT Roszell Gayden
- OT Andre Harris
- LB Jessel Curry

Current roster

- 1 WR Trovon Reid (RFr)-projected starter
- 3 WR DeAngelo Benton (Jr)
- 5 RB Michael Dyer (So)-projected starter
- 5 LB Jake Holland (So)-projected starter
- 6 CB Jonathan Mincy (RFr)
- 8 RB Anthony Gulley-Morgan (RSo)
- 9 WR Quindarius Carr (Sr)
- 9 CB Ryan White (So)
- 10 LB LaDarius Owens (RFr)
- 11 CB Chris Davis (So)
- 12 FS Demetruce McNeal (So)-projected starter
- 13 DE Craig Sanders (So)
- 14 QB Barrett Trotter (Jr)-projected starter
- 15 QB Clint Moseley (So)
- 15 CB Neiko Thorpe (Sr)-projected starter
- 16 FS Ikeem Means (Jr)
- 18 QB Logan Paul (So)
- 20 SS Drew Cole (Sr)
- 21 LB Eltoro Freeman (Jr)
- 22 CB T'Sharvin Bell (Jr)-projected starter
- 23 RB Onterio McCalebb (Jr)
- 25 LB Daren Bates (Jr)-projected starter
- 28 CB Jonathan Rose (Fr)
- 29 K Chandler Brooks (Sr)
- 30 P Steven Clarke (So)-projected starter
- 35 LB Jonathan Evans (Jr)-projected starter
- 36 K Cody Parkey (So)-projected starter
- 37 FB LaDarius Phillips (RFr)-projected starter
- 38 LB Jawara White (RFr)
- 40 HB Chris Humpheries (Sr)
- 43 TE Philip Lutzenkirchen (Jr)-projected starter
- 45 RB Davis Hooper (Sr)
- 50 C Reese Dismukes (Fr)-projected starter
- 52 DE Justin Delaine (RFr)
- 54 NT Jeff Whitaker (So)-projected starter
- 55 DE Corey Lemonier (So)-projected starter
- 58 LB Harris Gaston (So)
- 60 OG Eric Mack (RFr)
- 61 LS Josh Harris (Jr)-projected starter
- 62 LT Chris Slade (RFr)
- 63 C Blake Burgess (So)
- 65 C Tunde Funiyike (RFr)
- 66 OG Thomas O'Reilly (Fr)
- 68 OG Ed Christian (RFr)
- 70 OG Shon Coleman (Fr)
- 71 RG John Sullen (Jr)-projected starter
- 74 NT Jamar Travis (Jr)
- 75 OT Brandon Mosely (Sr)-projected starter
- 77 OT A.J. Greene (Sr)-projected starter
- 78 OT Aubrey Phillips (Fr)
- 79 OG Jarod Cooper (Sr)-projected starter
- 80 WR Emory Blake (Jr)-projected starter
- 83 TE Chad Croce (So)
- 85 WR Travante Stallworth (RSo)
- 91 DE Joel Bonomolo (RJr)
- 92 NG Kenneth Carter (So)-projected starter
- 94 DE Nosa Equae (So)-projected starter
- 95 DE Dee Ford (Jr)
- 97 NG Derrick Lykes (Sr)

Transfers

- RB Mike Blakely (Fr)- University Of Florida
- RB Corey Grant (RFr)-University Of Alabama

== Schedule ==
Date	Time	Opponent	Rank	Site	TV	Result	Attendance
September 3	11:00 a.m.	Utah State*	No. 23	Jordan–Hare Stadium; Auburn, AL	ESPN2	W 42–38	85,245
September 10	11:30 a.m.	No. 16 Mississippi State		Jordan–Hare Stadium; Auburn, AL	SECN	W 41–34	87,451
September 17	11:00 a.m.	at Clemson*	No. 21	Memorial Stadium; Clemson, SC (rivalry)	ABC	L 24–38	81,514
September 24	6:00 p.m.	Florida Atlantic*		Jordan–Hare Stadium; Auburn, AL	SECRN	W 30–14	82,249
October 1	2:30 p.m.	at No. 10 South Carolina		Williams-Brice Stadium; Columbia, SC	CBS	W 16–13	81,767
October 8	6:00 p.m.	at No. 10 Arkansas	No. 15	Donald W. Reynolds Razorback Stadium; Fayetteville, AR	ESPN	L 14–38	74,191
October 15	6:00 p.m.	Florida	No. 24	Jordan–Hare Stadium; Auburn, AL (rivalry)	ESPN	W 17–6	87,451
October 22	2:30 p.m.	at No. 1 LSU	No. 20	Tiger Stadium; Baton Rouge, LA (Tiger Bowl)	CBS	L 10–45	93,098
October 29	6:00 p.m.	Ole Miss	No. 23	Jordan–Hare Stadium; Auburn, AL (rivalry)	ESPNU	W 41–23	85,347
November 12	2:30 p.m.	at No. 15 Georgia	No. 20	Sanford Stadium; Athens, GA (Deep South's Oldest Rivalry)	CBS	L 7–45	92,746
November 19	12:00 p.m.	(FCS) Samford*^{†}		Jordan–Hare Stadium; Auburn, AL	PPV	W 35–16	84,842
November 26	2:30 p.m.	No. 2 Alabama	No. 24	Jordan–Hare Stadium; Auburn, AL (Iron Bowl) (College GameDay)	CBS	L 14–42	87,451
December 31	6:30 p.m.	vs. Virginia*		Georgia Dome; Atlanta, GA (Chick-fil-A Bowl)	ESPN	W 43–24	72,919
*Non-conference game; ^{†}Homecoming; Rankings from AP Poll released prior to the game; All times are in Central time

- Source: Official schedule

== Game summaries ==
=== Utah State ===
Team	1	2	3	4	Total
Utah State	14	7	3	14	38
• Auburn	7	7	14	14	42

- Date: September 3
- Location: Jordan–Hare Stadium, Auburn, AL
- Game start: 11:04 a.m.
- Elapsed time: 3:23
- Game attendance: 85,245
- Game weather: 85°; Fair
- Referee: Penn Wagers
- TV announcers (ESPN2): Beth Mowins (play-by-play), Mike Bellotti (analyst)

=== Mississippi State ===
#16 Mississippi State at Auburn

Team	1	2	3	4	Total
Mississippi State	14	10	3	7	34
• Auburn	14	17	3	7	41

- Date: September 10
- Location: Jordan–Hare Stadium, Auburn, AL
- Game start: 11:22 a.m.
- Elapsed time: 3:50
- Game attendance: 87,451
- Game weather: 77°; Clear
- Referee: Matt Moore
- TV announcers (SEC Network): Dave Neal (play-by-play), Andre Ware (analyst), Cara Capuano (sideline reporter)

=== Clemson ===
Team	1	2	3	4	Total
Auburn	14	7	3	0	24
• Clemson	0	21	14	3	38

- Date: September 17
- Location: Memorial Stadium, Clemson, SC
- Game start: 11:07 a.m.
- Elapsed time: 3:25
- Game attendance: 81,514
- Game weather: 68°; Cloudy Skies
- Referee: Matt Austin
- TV announcers (ABC): Dave Pasch (play-by-play), Urban Meyer and Chris Spielman (analysts), Quint Kessenich (sideline reporter)

=== Florida Atlantic ===
Team	1	2	3	4	Total
Florida Atlantic	3	3	0	8	14
• Auburn	10	0	20	0	30

- Date: September 24
- Location: Jordan–Hare Stadium, Auburn, AL
- Game start: 6:09 p.m.
- Elapsed time: 3:05
- Game attendance: 82,249
- Game weather: 81°; Sunny
- Referee: David Smith
- TV announcers (SECRN): Bob Rathbun (play-by-play), Tim Couch (analyst), Kristina Akra (sideline reporter)

=== South Carolina ===
Auburn at #10 South Carolina

Team	1	2	3	4	Total
• Auburn	3	6	0	7	16
South Carolina	6	0	7	0	13

- Date: October 1
- Location: Williams-Brice Stadium, Columbia, SC
- Game start: 2:30 p.m.
- Elapsed time: 3:59
- Game attendance: 81,767
- Game weather: 68°; Sunny
- Referee: Matt Moore
- TV announcers (CBS): Spero Dedes (play-by-play), Steve Beuerlein (analyst), Otis Livingston (sideline reporter)

=== Arkansas ===
Team	1	2	3	4	Total
Auburn	14	0	0	0	14
• Arkansas	7	14	7	10	38

- Date: October 8
- Location: Razorback Stadium, Fayetteville, AR
- Game start: 6:11 p.m.
- Elapsed time: 3:32
- Game attendance: 74,191
- Game weather: 78°; Sunny
- Referee: Ken Williamson
- TV announcers (ESPN): Brad Nessler (play-by-play), Todd Blackledge (analyst), Holly Rowe (sideline reporter)

=== Florida ===
Team	1	2	3	4	Total
Florida	0	6	0	0	6
• Auburn	7	0	0	10	17

- Date: October 15
- Location: Jordan–Hare Stadium, Auburn, AL
- Game start: 6:07 p.m.
- Elapsed time: 3:18
- Game attendance: 87,451
- Game weather: 77°; Clear Skies
- Referee: Hubert Owens
- TV announcers (ESPN): Brad Nessler (play-by-play), Todd Blackledge (analyst), Holly Rowe (sideline reporter)

=== LSU ===
Team	1	2	3	4	Total
Auburn	3	0	0	7	10
• LSU	7	14	21	3	45

- Date: October 22
- Location: Tiger Stadium, Baton Rouge, LA
- Game start: 2:39 p.m.
- Elapsed time: 3:11
- Game attendance: 93,098
- Game weather: 78°; Mostly Sunny
- Referee: Matt Austin
- TV announcers (CBS): Verne Lundquist (play-by-play), Gary Danielson (analyst), Tracy Wolfson (sideline reporter)

=== Ole Miss ===
Team	1	2	3	4	Total
Ole Miss	7	10	0	6	23
• Auburn	14	3	14	10	41

- Date: October 29
- Location: Jordan–Hare Stadium, Auburn, AL
- Game start: 6:02 p.m.
- Elapsed time: 3:13
- Game attendance: 85,347
- Game weather: 61°; Clear Skies
- Referee: Penn Wagers
- TV announcers (ESPNU): Clay Matvick (play-by-play), Brian Griese (analyst), Allison Williams (sideline reporter)

=== Georgia ===
Deep South's Oldest Rivalry

Team	1	2	3	4	Total
Auburn	7	0	0	0	7
• Georgia	14	21	3	7	45

- Date: November 12
- Location: Sanford Stadium, Athens, GA
- Game start: 3:40 p.m.
- Elapsed time: 3:15
- Game attendance: 92,746
- Game weather: 63°; Partly Cloudy
- Referee: Tom Ritter
- TV announcers (CBS): Verne Lundquist (play-by-play), Gary Danielson (analyst), Tracy Wolfson (sideline reporter)

=== Samford ===
Team	1	2	3	4	Total
Samford	0	10	3	3	16
• Auburn	7	7	7	14	35

- Date: November 19
- Location: Jordan–Hare Stadium, Auburn, AL
- Game start: 12:05 p.m.
- Elapsed time: 2:54
- Game attendance: 84,842
- Game weather: 55°; Cloudy
- Referee: Hubert Owens
- TV announcers (PPV): Andy Burcham (play-by-play), Ben Leard (analyst)

=== Alabama ===
Team	1	2	3	4	Total
• Alabama	14	10	3	15	42
Auburn	7	0	7	0	14

- Date: November 26
- Location: Jordan–Hare Stadium, Auburn, AL
- Game start: 2:39 p.m.
- Elapsed time: 3:14
- Game attendance: 87,451
- Game weather: 70°; Partly Cloudy
- Referee: Matt Austin
- TV announcers (CBS): Verne Lundquist (play-by-play), Gary Danielson (analyst), Tracy Wolfson (sideline reporter)

=== Virginia ===
Chick-fil-A Bowl

Team	1	2	3	4	Total
Virginia	7	10	7	0	24
• Auburn	7	21	12	3	43

- Date: December 31
- Location: Georgia Dome, Atlanta, GA
- Game start: 6:36 p.m.
- Elapsed time: 3:23
- Game attendance: 72,919
- Game weather: Indoors
- Referee: Dennis Hannigan
- TV announcers (ESPN): Brad Nessler (play-by-play), Todd Blackledge (analyst), Holly Rowe (sideline reporter)

=== Recruiting class ===
College recruiting information (2011)
Name	Hometown	School	Height	Weight	40^{‡}	Commit date
Anthony Swain; S	Gadsden, AL	Gadsden High School	6 ft 2 in (1.88 m)	215 lb (98 kg)	N/A	Mar 27, 2010
Anthony Swain; S	Recruit ratings: Scout: Rivals: (78)					
Thomas O'Reilly; G	Marietta, GA	Pope High School	6 ft 4 in (1.93 m)	313 lb (142 kg)	5.25	Apr 13, 2010
Thomas O'Reilly; G	Recruit ratings: Scout: Rivals: (80)					
Reese Dismukes; C	Spanish Fort, AL	Spanish Fort High School	6 ft 3 in (1.91 m)	285 lb (129 kg)	5.00	Apr 21, 2010
Reese Dismukes; C	Recruit ratings: Scout: Rivals: (81)					
Angelo Blackson; DE	Bear, DE	Red Lion Christian Academy	6 ft 5 in (1.96 m)	294 lb (133 kg)	4.72	May 8, 2010
Angelo Blackson; DE	Recruit ratings: Scout: Rivals: (80)					
Chris Landrum; MLB	Sweet Water, AL	Sweet Water High School	6 ft 3 in (1.91 m)	221 lb (100 kg)	N/A	May 12, 2010
Chris Landrum; MLB	Recruit ratings: Scout: Rivals: (76)					
Kiehl Frazier; QB	Springdale, AR	Shiloh Christian Academy	6 ft 3 in (1.91 m)	215 lb (98 kg)	4.57	May 29, 2010
Kiehl Frazier; QB	Recruit ratings: Scout: Rivals: (81)					
JaBrian Niles; DT	Mobile, AL	Davidson High School	6 ft 2 in (1.88 m)	272 lb (123 kg)	4.70	Jun 15, 2010
JaBrian Niles; DT	Recruit ratings: Scout: Rivals: (80)					
Sammie Coates; WR	Leroy, AL	Leroy High School	6 ft 2 in (1.88 m)	177 lb (80 kg)	4.31	Jul 17, 2010
Sammie Coates; WR	Recruit ratings: Scout: Rivals: (78)					
Jaylon Denson; WR	Hoover, AL	Hoover High School	6 ft 3 in (1.91 m)	195 lb (88 kg)	4.53	Jul 19, 2010
Jaylon Denson; WR	Recruit ratings: Scout: Rivals: (77)					
Justin Garrett; OLB	Tucker, GA	Tucker High School	6 ft 2 in (1.88 m)	196 lb (89 kg)	N/A	Jul 27, 2010
Justin Garrett; OLB	Recruit ratings: Scout: Rivals: (77)					
CJ Uzomah; TE	Suwanee, GA	North Gwinnett High School	6 ft 5 in (1.96 m)	235 lb (107 kg)	4.74	Jul 31, 2010
CJ Uzomah; TE	Recruit ratings: Scout: Rivals: (79)					
Jonathan Rose; CB	Leeds, AL	Leeds High School	6 ft 2 in (1.88 m)	180 lb (82 kg)	4.48	Aug 1, 2010
Jonathan Rose; CB	Recruit ratings: Scout: Rivals: (80)					
Keymiya Harrell; DE	Plantersville, AL	Dallas High School	6 ft 5 in (1.96 m)	238 lb (108 kg)	4.70	Aug 5, 2010
Keymiya Harrell; DE	Recruit ratings: Scout: Rivals: (78)					
Greg Robinson; G	Thibodaux, LA	Thibodaux High School	6 ft 4 in (1.93 m)	315 lb (143 kg)	4.90	Dec 10, 2010
Greg Robinson; G	Recruit ratings: Scout: Rivals: (80)					
Robensen "Cadillac" Thierize; S	Miami, FL	Jackson High School	5 ft 10 in (1.78 m)	205 lb (93 kg)	4.40	Jan 5, 2011
Robensen "Cadillac" Thierize; S	Recruit ratings: Scout: Rivals: (80)					
Quan Bray; RB/ATH	La Grange, GA	Troup County High School	5 ft 11 in (1.80 m)	175 lb (79 kg)	4.42	Jan 5, 2011
Quan Bray; RB/ATH	Recruit ratings: Scout: Rivals: (82)					
Kris Frost; LB/WR	Matthews, NC	Butler High School	6 ft 3 in (1.91 m)	210 lb (95 kg)	4.51	Jan 18, 2011
Kris Frost; LB/WR	Recruit ratings: Scout: Rivals: (80)					
Christian Westerman; G	Chandler, AZ	Hamilton High School	6 ft 5 in (1.96 m)	295 lb (134 kg)	5.13	Jan 21, 2011
Christian Westerman; G	Recruit ratings: Scout: Rivals: (86)					
Tre Mason; RB	Lake Worth, FL	Park Vista High School	5 ft 9 in (1.75 m)	187 lb (85 kg)	4.39	Jan 26, 2011
Tre Mason; RB	Recruit ratings: Scout: Rivals: (79)					
Davaunte Sigler; DE	Mobile, AL	Raines High School	6 ft 4 in (1.93 m)	249 lb (113 kg)	4.80	Jan 26, 2011
Davaunte Sigler; DE	Recruit ratings: Scout: Rivals: (78)					
Brandon Fulse; TE	Fort Meade, FL	Fort Meade High School	6 ft 5 in (1.96 m)	245 lb (111 kg)	4.80	Jan 27, 2011
Brandon Fulse; TE	Recruit ratings: Scout: Rivals: (81)					
Enrique Florence; S	Valley, AL	Valley High School	6 ft 3 in (1.91 m)	185 lb (84 kg)	4.46	Feb 2, 2011
Enrique Florence; S	Recruit ratings: Scout: Rivals: (81)					
Jermaine Whitehead; CB	Greenwood, MS	Amanda Elzy High School	6 ft 0 in (1.83 m)	183 lb (83 kg)	N/A	Feb 2, 2011
Jermaine Whitehead; CB	Recruit ratings: Scout: Rivals: (80)					
Gabe Wright; DT	Columbus, GA	Carver High School	6 ft 4 in (1.93 m)	300 lb (140 kg)	4.97	Feb 2, 2011
Gabe Wright; DT	Recruit ratings: Scout: Rivals: (82)					
Overall recruit ranking: Scout: 1 Rivals: 7 ESPN: 3
‡ Refers to 40-yard dash; Note: In many cases, Scout, Rivals, 247Sports, On3, and ESPN may conflict in their listings of height, weight and 40 time.; In these cases, the average was taken. ESPN grades are on a 100-point scale.; Sources: "Scout.com Football Recruiting: Auburn". Scout.; "2011 Player Signees- Auburn". ESPN.; "Scout.com Team Recruiting Rankings". Scout.; "2011 Team Ranking". Rivals.com.

== Rankings ==
Ranking movements Legend: ██ Increase in ranking ██ Decrease in ranking — = Not ranked RV = Received votes
	Week															
Poll	Pre	1	2	3	4	5	6	7	8	9	10	11	12	13	14	Final
AP	23	RV	21	RV	RV	15	24	19	RV	25	24	RV	RV	—	—	RV
Coaches	19	22	19	RV	RV	23	RV	23	RV	RV	25	RV	RV	—	—	RV
Harris	Not released						RV	21	RV	25	25	RV	RV	RV	RV	Not released
BCS	Not released							20	23	22	20	24	24	—	25	Not released
