= Jay Boulware =

American football player and coach (born 1972)

Current position
- Title: Running backs coach
- Team: West Virginia
- Conference: Big 12

Biographical details
- Born: November 26, 1972 (age 53); Irving, Texas, U.S.

Playing career
- 1991–1992: Texas
- Position: Offensive tackle

Coaching career (HC unless noted)
- 1994–1996: Texas (GA/TE)
- 1997–2000: Northern Illinois (TE/co-OL)
- 2001–2003: Arizona (TE/RB/ST)
- 2004: Stanford (RB)
- 2005–2006: Utah (TE/co-ST)
- 2007–2008: Iowa State (ST/RB)
- 2009–2012: Auburn (ST/TE)
- 2013–2019: Oklahoma (ST/RB)
- 2020: Texas (AHC/ST/TE)
- 2023–2025: Kentucky (RB/ST)
- 2026–present: West Virginia (RB)

Accomplishments and honors

Awards
- SWC Championship - (1994, 1995); 1994 Sun Bowl Champion

Jay Boulware (born November 26, 1972) is an American college football coach. As of 2026 he is the running backs coach for the West Virginia Mountaineers.

== College career ==
Boulware played on the offensive line at the University of Texas From 1992-95. He helped them to win the Southwest Conference Championship in 1994 and 1995 and played in the 1994 Sun Bowl and the 1996 Sugar Bowl.

Boulware earned his bachelor's degree in economics from the University of Texas in 1996.

== Coaching career ==
The coaching career of Jay Boulware began while he was still a student-athlete at the University of Texas. After two years as a backup offensive tackle, Boulware was slated to start in 1993 before his career ended after being diagnosed with cardiac arrhythmia. No longer able to play, he became a student-assistant coach for the Longhorns before becoming a graduate assistant working with the tight ends in 1996.

Boulware received his first full-time position coaching tight ends at Northern Illinois University, where after one season he was promoted to co-offensive line coach. During his four years at NIU, Boulware helped develop one of the best offenses in the nation as the Huskies ranked 12th in the nation in both rushing and scoring and 19th in total offense. In 2001, Boulware was lured away as tight ends coach for John Mackovic at Arizona. Boulware was also put in charge of special teams for the first time in his career and the following season his Wildcats kick returns unit finished ranked 4th in the nation. Upon the firing of Mackovic, Boulware left to join the Stanford staff as the running backs coach. In the summer months of 2004, Boulware honed his coaching skills working with the San Francisco 49ers as a participant in the NFL Minority Coaching Fellowship Program.

After Urban Meyer left for the Florida job, newly promoted Utah head coach Kyle Whittingham brought in Boulware to fill the vacant position coaching tight ends. He also served as co-special teams coordinator where he oversaw the nation's top ranked punting.

He left the Utes to join Gene Chizik's staff at Iowa State in 2007, serving as running backs coach and special teams coordinator. In Boulware's first season, newcomer tailbacks Alexander Robinson and J.J. Bass both posted a pair of 100-yard games. The performances marked the first time two different Cyclone running backs topped the century barrier twice in a single season since 2002. ISU's special teams finished second in the Big 12 in punting during 2008. The Cyclones also improved to 12th nationally in kickoff returns after ranking 109th the previous season.

When Chizik left to take the head coach position at Auburn, he brought Boulware along. On January 4, 2009, it was announced Boulware would serve as special teams coordinator as well as fill the vacant spot coaching tight ends. While special teams struggled due to depth issues during the 2009 season, junior college transfer Demond Washington ended the season ranked 6th in the nation in kickoff returns (averaging over 31 yards per return). In 2011, Auburn led the SEC in kickoff returns, kick return touchdowns, kickoff coverage and fewest punts returned. Boulware was also in charge of a punt unit that allowed only four punt return yards on 70 punts (ranked second in the country in punt return defense) in 2012. The Tigers also ranked third in the country in kickoff return defense, allowing just 16.6 yards per return.

On January 10, 2013, new head coach Gary Andersen hired Boulware to join his staff at Wisconsin. Boulware resigned after just two months to take the same position at Oklahoma.

Coach Boulware has experience coaching in 7 bowl games including the 1994 Sun Bowl, 1995 Sugar Bowl, 1996 (1997) Fiesta Bowl, 2005 Emerald Bowl, 2006 Armed Forces Bowl, 2010 Outback Bowl, 2011 BCS National Championship Game, 2011 Chick-fil-A Bowl, and the 2014 Sugar Bowl.

On December 12, 2022, Boulware was hired by Kentucky as the running backs coach and special teams coordinator.

=== Players coached ===
Boulware has served as position coach for a number of prominent players over his career. While still an assistant at Texas, one of the players he coached (Pat Fitzgerald) was named a first-team All-American. At NIU, Ryan Diem, a three-year starter for Boulware, was a two-time all-MAC selection and was drafted by the Indianapolis Colts in 2001. He was joined by another all-MAC player in McAllister Collins. Boulware was also responsible for recruiting current Atlanta Falcons running back Michael Turner to Northern Illinois.

While at Arizona, Boulware coached second-team all-PAC10 running back Mike Bell who is now playing for the New Orleans Saints. At Utah, he helped freshman kick returner Brent Casteel earn honorable mention Freshman All-America honors from Sporting News, averaging over 23 yards per return. While at Iowa State, he coached another standout freshman kickoff returner, Leonard Johnson, to a top-20 national performance. The Rivals.com second-team Freshman All-American kick returner was the 2nd leading returner in his class after gaining 1055 yards, averaging over 26 yards per return. With 319 kickoff return yards against Oklahoma State, Johnson set an NCAA FBS single-game record.

At Auburn, freshman Tre Mason ranked 15th in the nation in kick returns. Boulware also tutored All-America punter Steven Clark, a 2011 Ray Guy Award finalist. Kicker Wes Byrum set a single-season Auburn record for field goal percentage (93.8), connecting on 15-of-16 field goals, and set a school record for conversions and attempts, going 54-of-54 on PATs in his first season under Boulware. Boulware also guided Demond Washington to an Auburn single-season record for kickoff return average, as Washington’s average of 31.1 yards per return led the SEC and ranked sixth nationally. His star pupil at tight end was Philip Lutzenkirchen, a second-team All-SEC selection in 2011 who set the Auburn tight end record for career touchdown receptions.

== Personal life ==
He is married to Chantay Sanders-Boulware, with whom he has one daughter, Jordin.
