= Gene Chizik =

American football player and coach (born 1961)

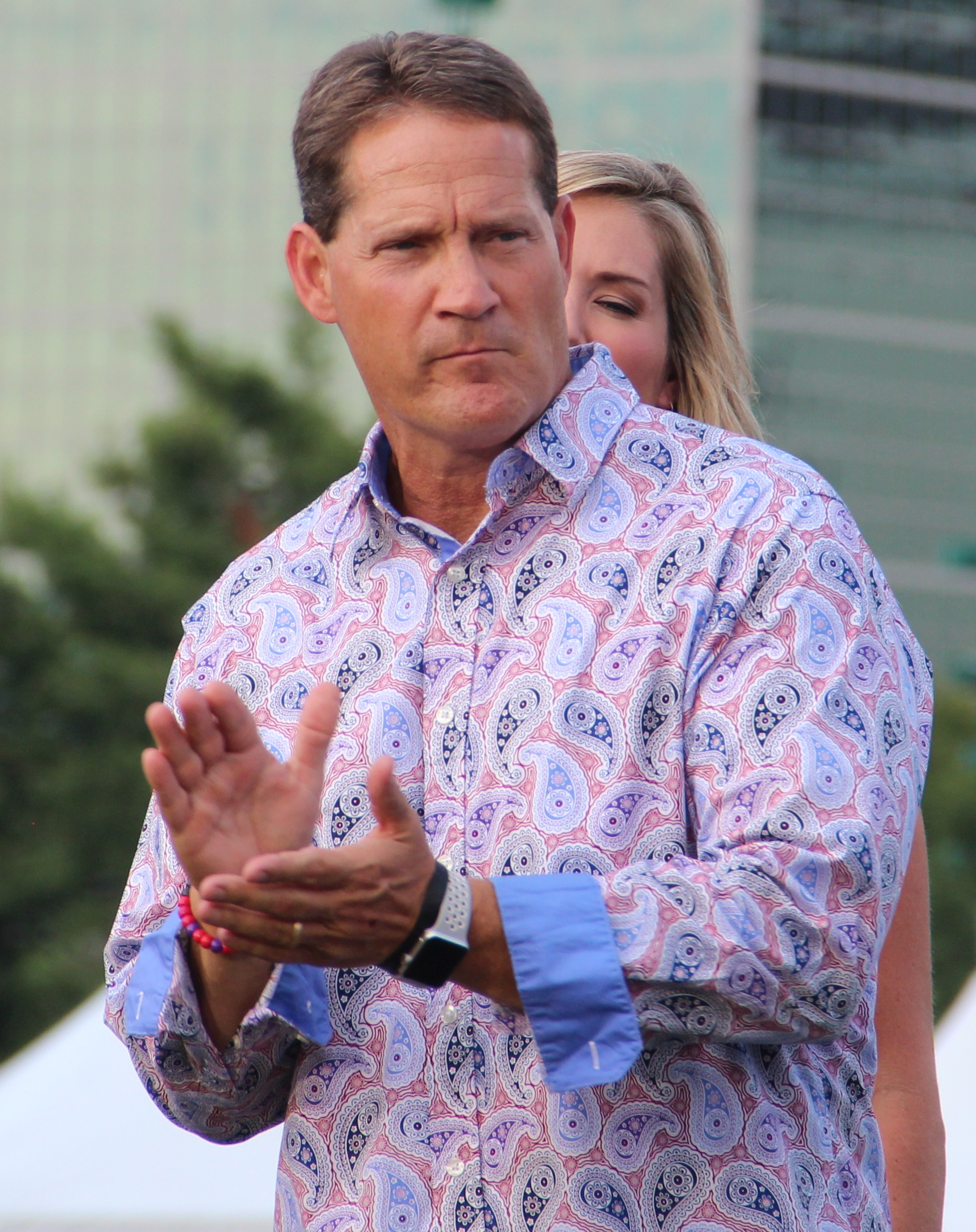
- Chizik at Centennial Olympic Park, 2018

Biographical details
- Born: December 28, 1961 (age 64); Tarpon Springs, Florida, U.S.

Playing career
- 1981: Florida
- Position: Linebacker

Coaching career (HC unless noted)
- 1986–1987: Seminole HS (FL) (DC/LB)
- 1988–1989: Clemson (GA/OLB)
- 1990–1991: Middle Tennessee (DE)
- 1992–1994: Stephen F. Austin (LB)
- 1995: Stephen F. Austin (DB)
- 1996–1997: Stephen F. Austin (DC/DB)
- 1998: UCF (DC/LB)
- 1999–2001: UCF (DC/DB)
- 2002–2004: Auburn (DC/DB)
- 2005–2006: Texas (co-DC/AHC/LB)
- 2007–2008: Iowa State
- 2009–2012: Auburn
- 2015–2016: North Carolina (DC)
- 2022–2023: North Carolina (AHC/DC)

Head coaching record
- Overall: 38–38
- Bowls: 3–0

Accomplishments and honors

Championships
- 1 National (2010); 1 SEC (2010); 1 SEC West Division (2010)

Awards
- Broyles Award (2004); Home Depot Coach of the Year (2010); Liberty Mutual Coach of the Year Award (2010); Paul "Bear" Bryant Award (2010); Bobby Bowden National Collegiate Coach of the Year Award (2010); SEC Coach of the Year (2010)

Eugene C. Chizik Jr. (born December 28, 1961) is an American football coach who was most recently the defensive coordinator and Assistant Head Coach for Defense at North Carolina. A veteran of the coaching ranks, Chizik previously was UNC's defensive coordinator for the 2015 and 2016 seasons, and served as the head coach of the Auburn football team from 2009 until the end of the 2012 season. Chizik's 2010 Auburn Tigers football team completed a 14–0 season with a victory over Oregon in the BCS National Championship Game, and quarterback Cam Newton won the Heisman Trophy. Chizik played college football at the University of Florida in 1981 for head coach Charley Pell.

== Early life ==
Chizik was born in Florida. Chizik earned a bachelor's degree in education from the University of Florida in 1986, and received a master's degree in guidance and counseling from Clemson University in 1991.

== Coaching career ==
=== Early years ===
Chizik began his coaching career at Seminole High School, serving as their defensive coordinator and inside linebacker coach from 1986 to 1988. While coaching at Seminole High School, he taught at Bauder Elementary School. He then became a graduate assistant at Clemson from 1988 to 1989, working with the outside linebackers. During his time at Clemson he coached in the 1988 Citrus Bowl and the 1989 Gator Bowl, under secondary coach Bill Oliver.

His initial full-time coaching job was as the defensive ends coach at Middle Tennessee State from 1990 to 1991. In 1990, the Blue Raiders won the Ohio Valley Conference championship. His next assignment was at Stephen F. Austin State University, serving as their linebackers coach from 1992 to 1995. SFA advanced to the Division I-AA semifinals in 1995. He was then promoted to the defensive coordinator role, which he held from 1996 to 1997. He then served as the defensive coordinator and secondary coach for the UCF Knights from 1998 to 2001.

While at UCF in Orlando, Chizik frequently visited practice sessions of the NFL's Tampa Bay Buccaneers studying the team's defensive scheme developed by then-Buccaneers head coach Tony Dungy, defensive coordinator Monte Kiffin and linebackers coach Lovie Smith.

Chizik later employed a very similar scheme at Auburn, where he served again as the defensive coordinator and secondary coach from 2002 to 2004. During this time, he had some of the greatest successes of his career to date. He coached in three bowl games, the 2003 Capital One Bowl, 2004 Music City Bowl, and 2005 Sugar Bowl. His 2004 defensive unit led the country in scoring defense, giving up 11.3 points per game, and the total defense ranked 5th, which is the same ranking the 2003 team recorded. He garnered the 2004 Broyles Award, which is given each year to the top assistant coach in the nation. The 2004 Auburn Tigers football team finished 13–0 that year, won the SEC title, and defeated Virginia Tech in the Sugar Bowl. It placed second in the final AP and Coaches polls.

In 2005, Chizik was hired by Texas to serve as their co-defensive coordinator, assistant head coach, and linebackers coach. During his time at Texas, the team won the 2005 NCAA Division I-A national football championship by defeating USC in the 2006 Rose Bowl.

=== Iowa State ===
In November 2006, Chizik was hired to replace outgoing coach Dan McCarney as head football coach of Iowa State. McCarney resigned after going 4–8 in his final season, despite five bowl appearances during his tenure, the most of any Iowa State coach at that time. Chizik's contract with ISU was a six-year deal worth a guaranteed $6.75 million. With incentives, the total had the potential to be more than $10 million. In Chizik's first season, Iowa State finished 3–9, including a 15–13 upset victory over Iowa, and back-to-back wins against Kansas State and Colorado. The Cyclones also experienced a notable improvement on defense. In the year prior to Chizik's arrival, Iowa State was ranked 102nd nationally in total defense and in Chizik's first year, they improved to 65th.

In 2008, Iowa State won their first two games against South Dakota State and Kent State before losing their final 10 games to finish the season 2–10. Among all 119 Division I FBS teams, the team ranked 111th in total defense, 115th in passing defense, and 95th in rushing defense. Following the 2008 season, Chizik fired two assistant coaches and demoted both his offensive and defensive coordinators. Chizik's name came up frequently as a coach who would be on the hot seat for the following season, though all acknowledged the difficulty of the job given the lack of resources and difficult schedule.

=== Auburn ===
On December 13, 2008, Auburn University hired Chizik to succeed former head coach Tommy Tuberville, who resigned from the position after finishing 5–7 in the 2008 season. Auburn athletic director Jay Jacobs released a statement that said: "I know that we have found the right fit for Auburn. Gene's body of work during his 23 years in this profession is remarkable. He has a strong knowledge of this athletics program, this university and the community, and he knows how to be successful in the Southeastern Conference. He is a high-energy coach that is an outstanding motivator and demands a tough, physical style of football."

Chizik first retained James Willis to continue coaching linebackers. However, less than one month later, Willis left Auburn to coach for the University of Alabama. Ted Roof eventually replaced Willis and served as Auburn's linebacker coach and defensive coordinator. Roof had previously been the defensive coordinator at Minnesota before coming to Auburn. Chizik hired Gus Malzahn as his offensive coordinator. Malzahn enjoyed the nation's top offense at Tulsa the previous two seasons. He subsequently hired Curtis Luper and Trooper Taylor, both of whom were coaching at Oklahoma State, to coach running backs and wide receivers. Chizik also brought Jay Boulware from his ISU staff to be the special teams coordinator and hired former Auburn player Tracy Rocker away from Arkansas to coach the defensive line. The final hire was UNC linebackers coach Tommy Thigpen as safeties coach.

Chizik's incentive-laden contract at Auburn was for five years with a salary of approximately $1.9 million per year, an $800,000 increase from his Iowa State contract. Iowa State was paid $750,000 by Chizik to be released from his contract which was paid by a loan from Auburn that was forgiven $150,000 for every year Chizik coaches, and would have been paid off entirely if he reached the end of the five-year deal. For the BCS Championship 2010 season, Chizik earned a base salary of $2.1 million plus bonuses worth an additional $1.1 million, including $500,000 for 13 wins, an SEC title, a BCS bowl appearance, and winning the AP SEC Coach of the Year, and an additional $600,000 for winning the BCS Championship Game.

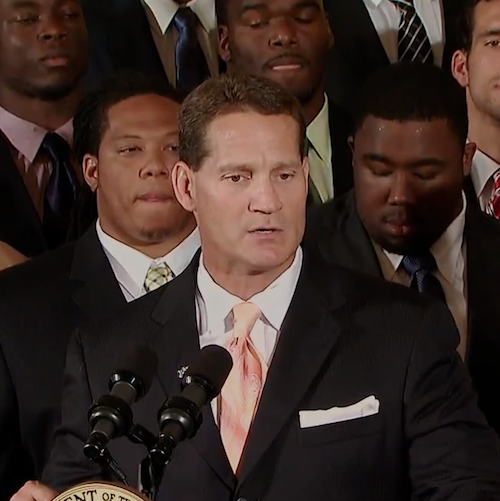
Chizik at the White House, 2011

In his first year, Chizik led the Tigers to the 2010 Outback Bowl, a fairly quick turnaround for a team that went 5–7 the year before. The next year, he led the team to a 14–0 record and the BCS National Championship—the first undisputed national championship in school history. With the loss of several players who opted to go pro, Chizik's third-year record slipped to 8–5. The 2012 season was the first season that Chizik did not have Gus Malzahn on staff; Malzahn had accepted the head coach position at Arkansas State following the 2011 season. The 2012 season was disappointing as the team finished 3–9 and was outscored 150–21 in its final three SEC games—including a 49–0 loss to Alabama in the Iron Bowl. With Malzahn's absence, media and alumni criticized coach Chizik, claiming he only won a championship at Auburn due to Malzahn's playcalling and assisting him as head coach.

Chizik was released after four seasons, and Auburn bought out his contract for $11.09 million. Chizik received $7.5 million based on his December 1 contractual buyout amount and assistant coaches received the remainder.

Overall, Auburn went 33–19 during Chizik's tenure as head football coach. His only winning record in conference play was the 2010 national championship season.

=== North Carolina ===
Chizik was named defensive coordinator at the University of North Carolina at Chapel Hill on January 19, 2015. He inherited a unit that had given up 497 yards per game in 2014; only three other teams in Power 5 conferences had surrendered more yards per game. The 2014 team ranked 120th nationally in overall defense. Through 11 games, Chizik's defense had surrendered 384 yards per game, a major factor in the Tar Heels going on a school record eleven-game winning streak and earning their 1st ACC Coastal Division championship. Chizik's 2015 and 2016 defense units ranked 96th and 63rd nationally, respectively. Chizik resigned in February 2017.

==== Return to North Carolina ====
After a multi-year hiatus from coaching, Chizik returned to Chapel Hill and was named assistant head coach for defense, following the departure of defensive coordinator Jay Bateman. He replaced Bateman on January 8, 2022. Chizik served as the de facto defensive coordinator, with the defense utilizing his preferred scheme, despite Charlton Warren and Tommy Thigpen having co-coordinator titles. His 2022 Tar Heel defense finished close to the bottom of the FBS in many statistical categories, ranking 102nd out of 131 teams in total defense. Most notably, in an early-season game against Appalachian State, Chizik's defense allowed forty points and 338 total yards of offense in the fourth quarter alone, though the Tar Heels would hang on to win 63–61. After the 2023 season, UNC Head Coach Mack Brown announced that Chizik would not return for the 2024 season.

== Media career ==
Following his termination from Auburn, Chizik did media work related to football, including ESPNU coverage of National Signing Day and hosting a weekly football radio show on Sirius Satellite Radio in 2013. In 2014, he joined the SEC Network as a studio analyst. Following his resignation from North Carolina after the 2016 season, he rejoined the SEC Network as an analyst. He stepped down from the SEC Network upon his return to North Carolina in 2022. His third stint at the network began following his second departure from North Carolina.

== Personal life ==
Chizik is married to Joanna Chizik, the daughter of his high school football coach. They have identical twin daughters named Landry and Kennedy and a son Eugene Calloway, or "Cally". Cally is named after a former player that Chizik coached at Stephen F. Austin State University, Calloway "Cally" Presley Belcher. Belcher and Chizik had a very close relationship and Chizik named Cally in honor of Belcher, who died of a brain aneurysm after suffering a hit to the head in practice.

== Honors ==
- Broyles Award (2004)
- SEC Coach of the Year (AP) (2010)
- Home Depot Coach of the Year Award (2010)
- Liberty Mutual Coach of the Year Award (2010)
- Paul "Bear" Bryant Award (2010)
- Bobby Bowden National Collegiate Coach of the Year Award (2010)
- Amos Alonzo Stagg Coaching Award (2011)

== Head coaching record ==
Year	Team	Overall	Conference	Standing	Bowl/playoffs	Coaches^{#}	AP^{°}
Iowa State Cyclones (Big 12 Conference) (2007–2008)
2007	Iowa State	3–9	2–6	T–5th (North)			
2008	Iowa State	2–10	0–8	6th (North)			
Iowa State:		5–19	2–14				
Auburn Tigers (Southeastern Conference) (2009–2012)
2009	Auburn	8–5	3–5	T–4th (Western)	W Outback		
2010	Auburn	14–0	8–0	1st (Western)	W BCS NCG^{†}	1	1
2011	Auburn	8–5	4–4	4th (Western)	W Chick-fil-A		
2012	Auburn	3–9	0–8	7th (Western)			
Auburn:		33–19	15–17				
Total:		38–38					
National championship Conference title Conference division title or championship game berth
^{†}Indicates BCS or CFP / New Years' Six bowl.; ^{#}Rankings from final Coaches Poll.; ^{°}Rankings from final AP Poll.

== Notes ==
In 2022, Chizik's official title was Assistant Head Coach for Defense
