= 2011 Virginia Cavaliers football team =

American college football season

2011 Virginia Cavaliers football

Chick-fil-A Bowl, L 24–43 vs. Auburn
- Conference: Atlantic Coast Conference
- Coastal Division
- Record: 8–5 (5–3 ACC)
- Head coach: Mike London (2nd season)
- Offensive coordinator: Bill Lazor (2nd season)
- Offensive scheme: Pro-style
- Defensive coordinator: Jim Reid (2nd season)
- Base defense: 4–3
- Home stadium: Scott Stadium

2011 Atlantic Coast Conference football standings
	Conf.			Overall
Team	W		L	W		L
Atlantic Division
No. 22 Clemson x$	6	–	2	10	–	4
Wake Forest	5	–	3	6	–	7
No. 23 Florida State	5	–	3	9	–	4
NC State	4	–	4	8	–	5
Boston College	3	–	5	4	–	8
Maryland	1	–	7	2	–	10
Coastal Division
No. 21 Virginia Tech x%	7	–	1	11	–	3
Virginia	5	–	3	8	–	5
Georgia Tech	5	–	3	8	–	5
Miami (FL)	3	–	5	6	–	6
North Carolina	3	–	5	7	–	6
Duke	1	–	7	3	–	9
Championship: Clemson 38, Virginia Tech 10
$ – BCS representative as conference champion; % – BCS at-large representative; x – Division champion/co-champions; Rankings from AP Poll

The 2011 Virginia Cavaliers football team represented the University of Virginia in the 2011 NCAA Division I FBS football season. The Cavaliers were led by second-year head coach Mike London and played their home games at Scott Stadium. They were members of the Coastal Division of the Atlantic Coast Conference (ACC). Virginia had an 8–5 overall record on the season with a 5–3 mark in the ACC play to finish in a tie for second place in the Coastal Division. The Cavaliers appeared in the AP Poll and the Coaches Poll for the first time since 2007. Memorable moments from the season include: upsetting #12-ranked and undefeated Georgia Tech and defeating Florida State in Tallahassee for the first time in school history. They also became the first team in NCAA history to win road games against the Miami Hurricanes and the Florida State Seminoles in the same season. They were invited to the Chick-fil-A Bowl, where they were defeated by Auburn, 43–24.

== Previous season ==
The Cavaliers went 4–8 in 2010, their third losing season in a row, and first under new head coach Mike London. Despite having an off-season recruiting class among the best in the country, a major upset versus the then #22 Miami Hurricanes, and a near-upset in the week two game versus the University of Southern California Trojans, the Cavaliers were plagued by penalties (ranked 117th out of 120 in the country) and turnovers, and finished 5th in the Atlantic Coast Conference's Coastal division. In the ACC Preseason Poll, they were picked to finish at next to last place in the ACC Coastal division, and 11th of 12 overall. ESPN predicted that UVA would be one of the only two ACC teams (alongside Wake Forest) to not achieve bowl eligibility.

== Schedule ==
Date	Time	Opponent	Rank	Site	TV	Result	Attendance
September 3	6:00 pm	No. 3 (FCS) William & Mary*		Scott Stadium; Charlottesville, VA	ESPN3	W 40–3	51,956
September 10	7:00 pm	at Indiana*		Memorial Stadium; Bloomington, IN	BTN	W 34–31	41,549
September 17	3:30 pm	at North Carolina		Kenan Memorial Stadium; Chapel Hill, NC (South's Oldest Rivalry)	ESPNU	L 17–28	54,100
September 24	3:30 pm	Southern Miss*		Scott Stadium; Charlottesville, VA	ACCRSN	L 24–30	43,220
October 1	3:30 pm	Idaho*		Scott Stadium; Charlottesville, VA	ESPN3	W 21–20 ^{OT}	39,827
October 15	3:30 pm	No. 12 Georgia Tech^{†}		Scott Stadium; Charlottesville, VA	ESPNU	W 24–21	47,692
October 22	3:30 pm	NC State		Scott Stadium; Charlottesville, VA	ESPNU	L 14–28	46,030
October 27	8:00 pm	at Miami (FL)		Sun Life Stadium; Miami Gardens, FL	ESPN	W 28–21	40,403
November 5	12:30 pm	at Maryland		Byrd Stadium; College Park, MD (rivalry)	ACCN	W 31–13	37,401
November 12	3:00 pm	Duke		Scott Stadium; Charlottesville, VA	ACCRSN	W 31–21	45,733
November 19	7:30 pm	at No. 23 Florida State		Doak Campbell Stadium; Tallahassee, FL (Jefferson–Eppes Trophy)	ESPN2	W 14–13	77,178
November 26	3:30 pm	No. 6 Virginia Tech	No. 24	Scott Stadium; Charlottesville, VA (Commonwealth Cup)	ABC/ESPN2	L 0–38	61,124
December 31	7:30 pm	vs. Auburn*		Georgia Dome; Atlanta, GA (Chick-fil-A Bowl)	ESPN	L 24–43	72,919
*Non-conference game; ^{†}Homecoming; Rankings from AP Poll released prior to the game; All times are in Eastern time

== Personnel ==
Virginia Cavaliers football team roster
Players
Coaches
Offense

Pos.	#	Name	Class
TE		Jake McGee	Fr
QB		Ross Metheny
QB		Mike Rocco
QB		David Watford	Fr

Defense

Pos.	#	Name	Class

Special teams

Pos.	#	Name	Class

Head coach

- Mike London

Coordinators/assistant coaches

Legend

- (C) Team captain
- (S) Suspended
- (I) Ineligible
- Injured
- Redshirt

Roster

== Rankings ==
Ranking movements Legend: ██ Increase in ranking ██ Decrease in ranking — = Not ranked
	Week															
Poll	Pre	1	2	3	4	5	6	7	8	9	10	11	12	13	14	Final
AP	—	—	—	—	—	—	—	—	—	—	—	—	24	—	—	—
Coaches	—	—	—	—	—	—	—	—	—	—	—	—	25	—	—	—
Harris	Not released						—	—	—	—	—	—	25	—	—	Not released
BCS	Not released							—	—	—	—	—	—	—	—	Not released
