= Curtis Luper =

American football player and coach (born 1966)

Current position
- Title: Running backs coach
- Team: Missouri
- Conference: SEC

Biographical details
- Born: January 12, 1966 (age 60); Sherman, Texas, U.S.

Playing career
- 1984–1987: Oklahoma State
- 1993: Stephen F. Austin
- Position: Running back

Coaching career (HC unless noted)
- 1995–1997: Stephen F. Austin (GA/DB/RB)
- 1998: McKinney HS (TX) (RB)
- 1999–2001: Texas A&M–Commerce (AHC/DB)
- 2002–2004: New Mexico (RB)
- 2005–2008: Oklahoma State (AHC/RB)
- 2009–2012: Auburn (RB)
- 2013–2016: TCU (WR/RB)
- 2017–2019: TCU (co-OC/WR/RB)
- 2020–present: Missouri (RB)

Curtis Scott Luper (born January 12, 1966) is an American football coach who is currently the running backs coach with the Missouri Tigers. He previously coached running backs and was a recruiting coordinator at Auburn under head coach Gene Chizik. Luper served as the assistant head coach and running backs coach of the Oklahoma State Cowboys from 2005 to 2008.

Some of the prominent players Luper has helped develop include Dantrell Savage, Derrick Blaylock, DonTrell Moore, Terrance Shaw, Jeremiah Trotter, and Katie Hnida.

== Personal life ==
Luper earned his bachelor's degree in communications from Stephen F. Austin State University in 1996 and his master’s from the college in 1998. He also completed coursework toward a doctoral degree in secondary and higher education from Texas A&M–Commerce and is expected to receive it in May 2009. He has 5 children with his wife Nikki.

His son, Cameron Echols-Luper, is a football player.

== Playing career ==
Luper was a 1984 graduate of Sherman High School, where he captured All-State honors as a senior and was the #2-rated prep running back in Texas behind future Cowboys teammate Thurman Thomas. He was recruited to play at Oklahoma State where he played from 1984–1987 and was part of three bowl teams (playing behind future Hall-of-Fame running backs Thurman Thomas and Barry Sanders). Luper left school to serve as an air traffic controller for the United States Army, before completing his playing eligibility at Stephen F. Austin State University where he led the Lumberjacks in rushing and scoring as a second-team All-Southland Conference running back in 1993.

== Coaching career ==
Luper began his coaching career at Stephen F. Austin, spending 2 years as a graduate assistant working with the secondary and another as a running backs coach. He received his first full-time position as running backs coach at McKinney High School in 1998 before joining Texas A&M-Commerce as secondary coach in 1999. Luper served that position and assistant head coach until being lured away to coach running backs for Rocky Long at New Mexico in 2002.

After Les Miles left Oklahoma State to take the LSU job, newly promoted head coach Mike Gundy brought in Luper to fill the vacant position coaching running backs at his alma mater. Gundy (QB) and Luper (RB) were teammates on the OSU 1986 and 1987 squads. After the 2006 season, Luper was promoted to assistant head coach for player development in addition to his running backs duties.

In December 2008, Luper was interviewed for the open head coaching job at New Mexico State, but the job was filled by UCLA defensive coordinator DeWayne Walker.

=== Auburn ===
On January 2, 2009, new Auburn head coach Gene Chizik hired Luper to fill a vacant spot coaching the Tigers' running backs. He will also serve as Recruiting Coordinator. Chizik and Luper had previously worked together when Luper was a secondary assistant under Chizik's defense at Stephen F. Austin. Luper had previously spent eight months living in the state of Alabama during his tenure in the Army, splitting time between Fort McClellan in Anniston and Fort Rucker near Enterprise.

In 2010, Luper was recognized by Rivals.com as one of the top-25 recruiters in the nation. In 2011, ESPN selected Luper as one of the best recruiters in the Southeastern Conference.

The opportunity to reconnect with my mentor in Coach Chizik and have the chance to coach at a program known as "Running Back U", was something that I could not pass up.

— Curtis Luper

=== TCU ===
In January 2013, Luper was hired by Gary Patterson to coach the wide receivers for the Horned Frogs. A few days prior to the announcement of his hiring, Luper's son (Cameron Echols-Luper) announced he was committing to play wide receiver at TCU (over Texas A&M). In February 2017, he was promoted to co-offensive coordinator.

=== Mizzou ===
Ahead of the 2020 season, Luper was announced as the running backs coach for Eli Drinkwitz’s initial staff at Mizzou. At Mizzou, Luper has helped produce multiple All-American running backs and had the opportunity to coach his son, Chance Luper.

== Coaching successes ==
Luper has a history of successfully developing talent throughout his coaching career and has enjoyed successes at each of his stops. In his first year of coaching, he helped coach Stephen F. Austin to their semifinal run in the I-AA playoffs. In 2001, Texas A&M-Commerce finished second in the league in total defense, with his defensive backs helping to produce 30 takeaways. Luper also coached the league’s best kickoff return and coverage teams that season. While at New Mexico, Luper coached the Mountain West Conference's career rushing leader DonTrell Moore and helped the Lobo's finish 16th nationally in rushing in 2003, averaging 210 yards per game (265 rushing yards per MWC game).

In his first season on the OSU staff, one of his running backs, Mike Hamilton, rushed for a school freshman season record of 961 yards and was named the Big 12 offensive newcomer of the year. The 2006 season saw Luper tutor a trio of OSU running backs (Hamilton, Dantrell Savage and Keith Toston) to 2,000 rushing yards and 18 rushing touchdowns. He also coach back-to-back 1,000 yard rushers, with Dantrell Savage rushing for 1,272 yards in 2007 and Kendall Hunter rushing for 1,555 yards in 2008. Under Luper, Oklahoma State's running attack led the Big 12 Conference in rushing for 3 consecutive seasons (2006–2008). The Cowboys finished the 2006 season ranked seventh nationally in rushing, eighth nationally in 2007 and seventh nationally again in 2008 (averaging 256 yards per game).

In his first season on the Auburn staff, Ben Tate rushed for 1,362 yards (just under 105 yards per game), while the team finished the season ranked 13th in the nation in rushing. In 2010, true freshman back Mike Dyer rushed for over 1,000 yards and broke Bo Jackson's freshman rushing record.

Coach Luper has experience coaching in 16 bowl games including the 2002 Las Vegas Bowl, 2003 Las Vegas Bowl, 2004 Emerald Bowl, 2006 Independence Bowl, 2007 Insight Bowl, 2008 Holiday Bowl, 2010 Outback Bowl, 2011 BCS National Championship Game and the 2011 Chick-fil-A Bowl.
