= Mike London =

American football player and coach (born 1960)

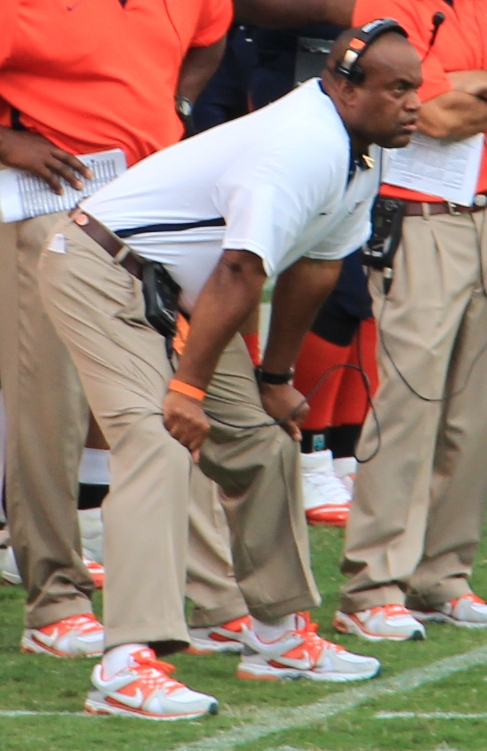

Current position
- Title: Head coach
- Team: William & Mary
- Conference: Patriot League
- Record: 45–33

Biographical details
- Born: October 9, 1960 (age 66); West Point, New York, U.S.

Playing career
- 1979–1982: Richmond
- 1983: Dallas Cowboys
- Position: Defensive back

Coaching career (HC unless noted)
- 1989–1990: Richmond (OLB)
- 1991–1994: William & Mary (DL)
- 1995–1996: Richmond (OLB/RC)
- 1997–2000: Boston College (DL)
- 2001: Virginia (DL)
- 2002–2004: Virginia (DL/RC)
- 2005: Houston Texans (DL)
- 2006–2007: Virginia (DC/DL)
- 2008–2009: Richmond
- 2010–2015: Virginia
- 2016: Maryland (AHC/DL)
- 2017–2018: Howard
- 2019–present: William & Mary

Head coaching record
- Overall: 107–94
- Bowls: 0–1
- Tournaments: 6–2 (NCAA D-I playoffs)

Accomplishments and honors

Championships
- 1 NCAA Division I (2008); 2 CAA (2009, 2022)

Awards
- AFCA FCS Coach of the Year (2008); BCA National Coach of the Year (2008); ACC Coach of the Year (2011)

Michael Wilson London Sr. (born October 9, 1960) is an American college football coach. He is the head football coach of William & Mary Tribe football at the College of William & Mary in Williamsburg, Virginia. He is a former defensive back and associate head coach and defensive line coach for the University of Maryland, College Park. Prior to Maryland, London was the head coach of the Virginia Cavaliers football program of the University of Virginia. Prior to William & Mary, London was head coach of the Howard Bison football program at Howard University in Washington, D.C. A native of the Hampton Roads area of Virginia, London played college and pro football as a defensive back for the Richmond Spiders and Dallas Cowboys. He was a police officer and detective in Richmond, Virginia with the city's street crimes unit before pursuing a coaching career.

He has served in various coaching roles with Richmond, William & Mary, Boston College, and Virginia, as well as the Houston Texans. His most notable roles have come as defensive coordinator and later head coach at the University of Virginia, head coach at Howard University where in 2017 he coached his team to the largest point spread upset victory in college football history, and previously as head coach at the University of Richmond, where his team won the NCAA Division I Football Championship in 2008.

== Coaching career ==
=== Position coach ===
First hired as a linebacker coach at the University of Richmond, Mike London later coached the defensive line at the College of William & Mary, Boston College, the Houston Texans of the National Football League, and the University of Virginia, twice.

London worked closely with St. Louis Rams defensive end Chris Long while he played for the Virginia Cavaliers. In an interview with The Washington Post, Long would later say of London, "when you get a coach who matches your intensity and emotion, you can just look at that person and know that at some level that coach is going to be with you through the thick and the thin."

=== Defensive coordinator ===
In 2006, London was named by Virginia coach Al Groh as the team's new defensive coordinator to replace Al Golden. Virginia's defense under London was much more aggressive than it was under Golden. Allowing just 289.5 yards per game, the Virginia defense under London gave up fewer yards than any Virginia defense had in the past 27 years. London developed first year defensive end Jeffrey Fitzgerald, who by the end of the season had more tackles than any other freshman in the country.

The next year his defense was perhaps even better given the scope of the UVA football program. A highlight of this season was when Virginia was scheduled to play the Miami Hurricanes in the last game ever in the legendary Miami Orange Bowl. The Virginia defense, under the supervision of London, dominated the 'Canes and Virginia won, 48–0. It was Miami's worst loss at the Orange Bowl in their 70 years of playing there. The Cavaliers finished the season ranked 6th in the nation in sacks with 40, and allowed the 19th-fewest rushing yards (106.7 yds/game) and the 16th-fewest points against (19.7/game) on the way to a 9-win season and a narrow loss to Texas Tech and Heisman Trophy candidate Michael Crabtree in the Gator Bowl. At the end of the season, lineman Chris Long won the Ted Hendricks Award and was drafted second overall in the 2008 NFL draft.

=== Head coach ===
==== Richmond Spiders ====
2008 season

On January 19, 2008, Mike London was named the head coach of the Richmond Spiders. Previous coach Dave Clawson had left to become the offensive coordinator at the University of Tennessee. Sixteen starters returned from a team that Clawson had taken to the semifinals of the FCS Football Championship playoffs. Soon after opening the season with a loss to Football Bowl Subdivision team Virginia 16–0, the team suffered heartbreaking losses to the James Madison Dukes and Villanova Wildcats by a touchdown or less. After the JMU loss, London's team stood at 4–3.

The 2008 Spiders would not lose another game. They rattled off nine straight victories including last-minute heroics against the William & Mary Tribe and Northern Iowa Panthers, a 33–13 dismantling of the heavily favored Appalachian State Mountaineers in Kidd Brewer Stadium, and culminating with a 24–7 blowout victory against the Montana Grizzlies in the NCAA Championship Game. In his first season, the University of Richmond had earned its first national championship in any sport.

2009 season

On September 5, 2009, Richmond upset the Duke Blue Devils of the Atlantic Coast Conference, 24–16, on their home turf in Wallace Wade Stadium. After beginning the 2009 campaign 8–0 and riding a streak of 17 straight wins, the Richmond Spiders became only the third FCS team ever to receive a vote in the AP Poll (after Northern Iowa in 2007, and Appalachian State later in the same season). Ray Ratto of the San Francisco Chronicle gave the Spiders their AP Top 25 vote for the week of November 2.

The Spiders won the CAA regular season, but lost in the Quarterfinals of the NCAA Tournament to Appalachian State. Just two days later, Mike London was announced as head football coach at the University of Virginia on December 7, 2009.

==== Virginia Cavaliers ====
2010 season

Following the termination of Al Groh, London was hired to coach the Virginia Cavaliers and initially awarded a five-year contract paying $1.7 million per year. He is the third African-American head football coach in the ACC, behind Wake Forest's Jim Caldwell and Miami's Randy Shannon. He is also the second African-American head coach of a major sport at Virginia; the first was former men's basketball coach Dave Leitao.

In London's first season with Virginia, his Cavaliers went 4–8, with two wins coming against I-FCS opponents. The best win of the season was over then-#22 Miami.

Following the season, London enjoyed a strong recruiting class, pulling in what is widely regarded as UVA's best (and largest) recruiting class since Groh's first full season in 2002.

2011 season

Having finished with a 4–8 overall record and having managed just one win in the ACC the previous season, London orchestrated a turnaround in 2011, taking the team to an 8–4 regular season record and a 5–3 mark in the conference. Signature wins in the 2011 campaign included upsets over previously undefeated and 12th-ranked Georgia Tech, at Miami, and at 23rd-ranked Florida State, at a venue (Doak Campbell Stadium) where UVA had never won. The final regular season game of the year pitted the 24th-ranked Cavaliers against the #5 Virginia Tech Hokies in a battle for not only the Commonwealth Cup, but also for the Coastal Division crown and a chance to play in the ACC championship. UVa lost the game 38–0, suffering its first home shutout since 1984.

Following the regular season, London was named ACC Coach of the Year, receiving 31 votes, ahead of Virginia Tech's Frank Beamer, who received 12 votes, and Clemson's Dabo Swinney, who received two votes.

2012 season

After leading the Cavalier football program to a bowl game the year before, London led UVA to a disappointing 4–8 season. Highlights included wins over Penn State and Miami. The Cavaliers suffered a loss to rival Virginia Tech their final game of the season, making it the ninth year in a row UVA has failed to beat Virginia Tech.

2013 season

The Cavaliers won their opening game against BYU, then lost ten of the next eleven games, culminating in a 2–10 season. The University lost every game against ACC opponents. The team suffered lopsided loses to Oregon, Ball State and Duke. Despite not being able to win consistently, London was able to recruit a small but stellar class for the 2014 season headlined by consensus five-star prospects Andrew Brown and Quin Blanding.

2014 season

Despite an opening game loss to UCLA, Virginia began the season 4–2, including an upset of top-25 Louisville, in their first game as ACC rivals and their first meeting at all in twenty-five years. Virginia lost their next four games, but rebounded with a win against Miami, only to lose at Virginia Tech.

2015 season

On November 26, 2014, Virginia athletic director Craig Littlepage confirmed that London would remain as coach for the 2015 season.

After a 1–3 start in the 2015 season, including a September 25, 14–56 blowout loss to the Boise State University Broncos, calls for London's resignation or termination began appearing in the media and elsewhere The University had no comment to the rumors and press stories, and many college football pundits did not give the reports much long term credibility, including Mike London himself. On November 29, 2015, after losing the last game of the season to Virginia Tech, London announced his resignation.

==== Howard Bison ====
2017 season

London became Howard University's head coach prior to the start of the 2017 season. On September 2, 2017, under the leadership of freshman quarterback Caylin Newton (younger brother of Cam Newton), London coached Howard to the program's first Football Bowl Subdivision (FBS) win; defeating UNLV, a 45-point favorite, in the biggest upset in college football history by point spread. The Bison would finish the season 7–4, 6–2 in MEAC play to finish in a tie for second place.

2018 season

The 2018 season was less favorable for Coach London's Bison as the team finished the season 4–6, 4–3 in MEAC play to finish in a tie for fourth place. However a bright spot for London was that his sophomore quarterback Caylin Newton was awarded 2018 MEAC Offensive Player of the Year.

On November 19, head coach Mike London resigned to become the head coach at William & Mary, replacing Jimmye Laycock, who was the Tribe's football coach since 1980. He finished at Howard with a winning two-year record of 11–10.

== Personal life ==
His son, Brandon London, is a retired wide receiver who played for the Montreal Alouettes of the Canadian Football League. His younger brother Paul London played defensive back for Virginia under George Welsh in the early 1990s. His daughter, Kristen London, played women's basketball at Virginia under famed former coach Debbie Ryan, and is currently playing professional football for the Denver Bandits of the Women's National Football Conference (WNFC). He is a member of Omicron Delta Kappa - The National Leadership Honor Society, and Phi Beta Sigma fraternity.

== Head coaching record ==
| Year | Team | Overall | Conference | Standing | Bowl/playoffs | Coaches^{#} | Media^{°} |
|---|---|---|---|---|---|---|---|
Richmond Spiders (Colonial Athletic Association) (2008–2009)
| 2008 | Richmond | 13–3 | 6–2 | 3rd (South) | W NCAA Division I Championship | 1 | 1 |
| 2009 | Richmond | 11–2 | 7–1 | 1st (South) | L NCAA Division I Quarterfinals | 5 | 5 |
| Richmond: | | 24–5 | 13–3 | | | | |
Virginia Cavaliers (Atlantic Coast Conference) (2010–2015)
| 2010 | Virginia | 4–8 | 1–7 | T–5th (Coastal) | | | |
| 2011 | Virginia | 8–5 | 5–3 | T–2nd (Coastal) | L Chick-fil-A | | |
| 2012 | Virginia | 4–8 | 2–6 | 6th (Coastal) | | | |
| 2013 | Virginia | 2–10 | 0–8 | 7th (Coastal) | | | |
| 2014 | Virginia | 5–7 | 3–5 | 7th (Coastal) | | | |
| 2015 | Virginia | 4–8 | 3–5 | 6th (Coastal) | | | |
| Virginia: | | 27–46 | 14–34 | | | | |
Howard Bison (Mid-Eastern Athletic Conference) (2017–2018)
| 2017 | Howard | 7–4 | 6–2 | T–2nd | | | |
| 2018 | Howard | 4–6 | 4–3 | T–4th | | | |
| Howard: | | 11–10 | 11–6 | | | | |
William & Mary Tribe (Colonial/Coastal Athletic Association) (2019–2025)
| 2019 | William & Mary | 5–7 | 3–5 | T–9th | | | |
| 2020–21 | William & Mary | 1–2 | 1–2 | 3rd (South) | | | |
| 2021 | William & Mary | 6–5 | 4–4 | T–5th | | | |
| 2022 | William & Mary | 11–2 | 7–1 | T–1st | L NCAA Division I Quarterfinal | 8 | 8 |
| 2023 | William & Mary | 6–5 | 4–4 | T–6th | | | |
| 2024 | William & Mary | 7–5 | 4–4 | T–9th | | | |
| 2025 | William & Mary | 7–5 | 6–2 | T–3rd | | | |
William & Mary Tribe (Patriot League) (2026–present)
| 2026 | William & Mary | 3–5 | 1–4 | | | | |
| William & Mary: | | 45–33 | 30–24 | | | | |
| Total: | | 107–94 | | | | | |
National championship Conference title Conference division title or championship game berth
^{#}Rankings from final Coaches Poll.; ^{°}Rankings from final Sports Network Poll.
