= 2011 Chick-fil-A Bowl =

- 44th Peach Bowl
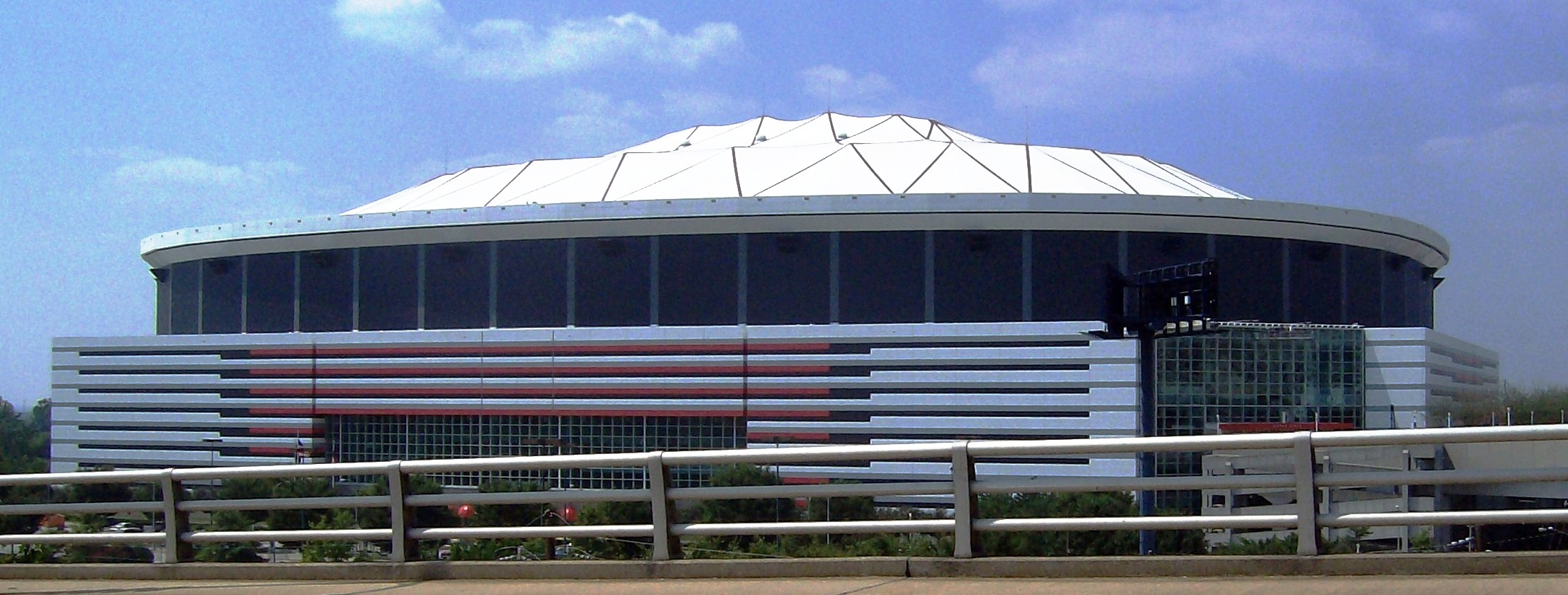
- The Georgia Dome in Atlanta, Georgia, hosted the Chick-fil-A Bowl.
Virginia Cavaliers	Auburn Tigers
(8–4)	(7–5)
ACC	SEC
24	43
Head coach: Mike London	Head coach: Gene Chizik
	AP / Coaches / BCS; NR / NR / 25
	1	2	3	4	Total
Virginia	7	10	7	0	24
Auburn	7	21	12	3	43
- Date: December 31, 2011
- Season: 2011
- Stadium: Georgia Dome
- Location: Atlanta, Georgia
- Favorite: Auburn by 1
- Referee: Dennis Hennigan (Big East)
- Attendance: 72,919
- Payout: US$3.35 million per team

United States TV coverage
- Network: ESPN/ESPN 3D
- Announcers: Brad Nessler (Play-by-Play); Todd Blackledge (Analyst); Holly Rowe (Sidelines)
- Nielsen ratings: 3.6

The 2011 Chick-fil-A Bowl was a college football bowl game held on December 31, 2011, at the Georgia Dome in Atlanta, Georgia, as part of the 2011–12 NCAA Bowl season. With sponsorship from Chick-fil-A, it was the 44th edition of the game known throughout most of its history as the Peach Bowl.

The game, which was telecast starting at 7:30 p.m. ET on ESPN and ESPN 3D, featured the Virginia Cavaliers from the Atlantic Coast Conference versus the Auburn Tigers from the Southeastern Conference. Auburn's running back Michael Dyer was suspended for this game, which was also Auburn offensive coordinator Gus Malzahn's last game as he would be taking a job as the head coach at Arkansas State.

The game started when Virginia scored two straight touchdowns from quarterback Michael Rocco, throwing both of them to wide receiver Kris Burd. As Auburn got the ball on their second possession, Auburn starting quarterback Clint Moseley went out with an ankle injury. Virginia went three and out, and then Auburn got some life after special teams player Garrett Harper blocked Virginia's second punt of the day.

Auburn took total control of the game as they scored on their next five possessions. Virginia scored ten more points after the blocked punt. The final score was 43–24 as Auburn won three straight bowl games. Auburn's dual-threat running back Onterio McCalebb had 109 yards rushing, 1 rushing TD, and 1 receiving TD. Auburn's freshman quarterback Kiehl Frazier ran for 3 touchdowns. Auburn line backer Jake Holland had an interception, and cornerback Chris Davis had some blocks and tackles, including one on a fourth-down trick play. Former Auburn starting quarterback Barrett Trotter returned with a TD, 175 yards and an average of 9.7 yards per play to end the 2011 season.

Auburn's Chris Davis won the Defensive MVP, and Onterio McCalebb won the Offensive MVP.
