= 2011 NCAA Division I FBS football season =

American college football season

2011 NCAA Division I FBS season
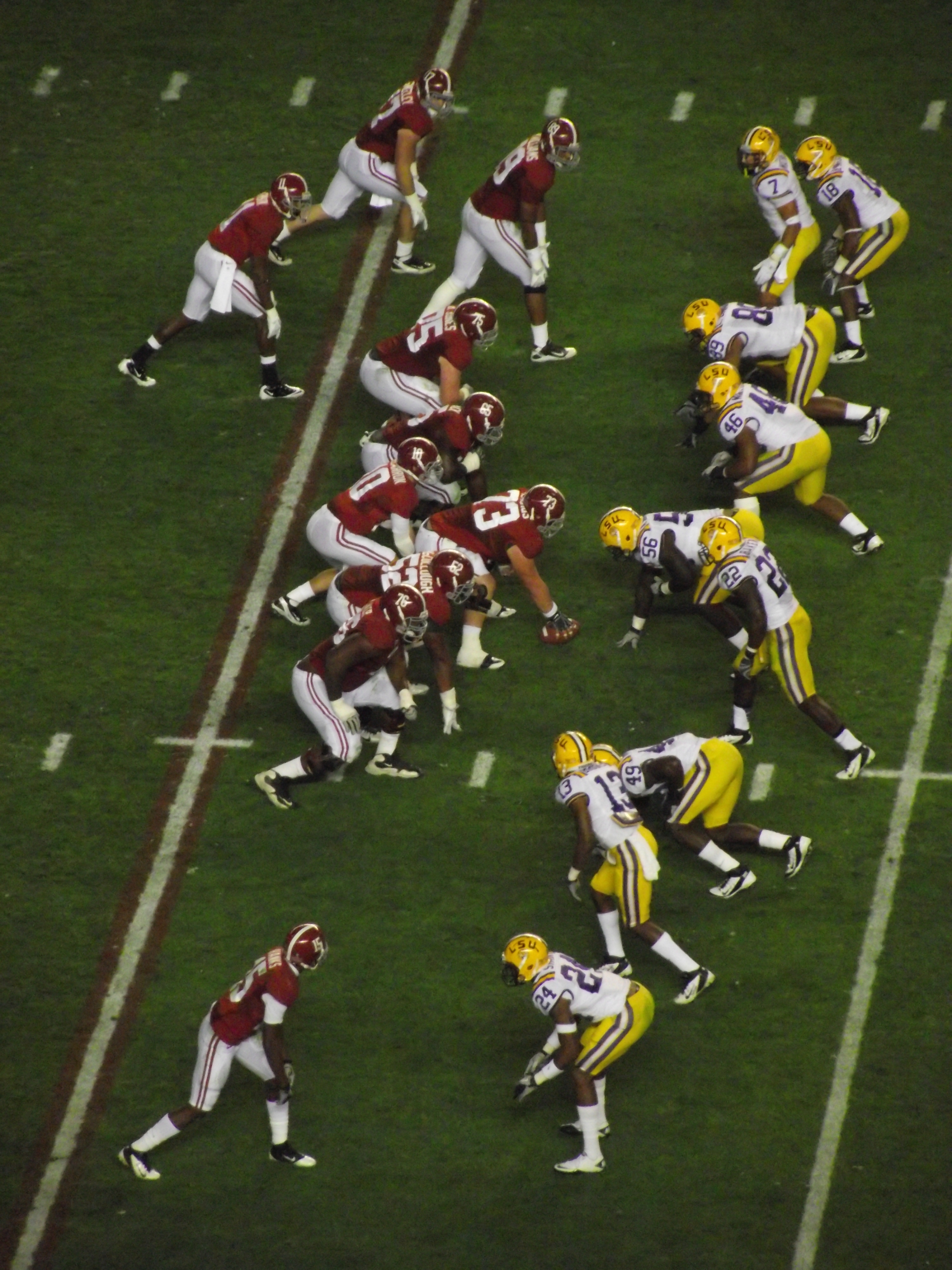
- Number of teams: 120
- Duration: September 1 – December 10
- Preseason AP No. 1: Oklahoma

Postseason
- Duration: December 17, 2011 – January 9, 2012
- Bowl games: 35
- Heisman Trophy: Robert Griffin III (quarterback, Baylor)

Bowl Championship Series
- 2012 BCS Championship Game
- Site: Mercedes-Benz Superdome New Orleans, Louisiana
- Champion(s): Alabama

NCAA Division I FBS football seasons
- ← 2010 2012 →

The 2011 NCAA Division I FBS football season was the highest level of college football competition in the United States organized by the National Collegiate Athletic Association (NCAA).

The regular season began on September 1, 2011, and ended on December 10, 2011. The postseason concluded on January 9, 2012, with the BCS National Championship Game at the Mercedes-Benz Superdome in New Orleans. The No. 2 Alabama Crimson Tide defeated the No. 1 LSU Tigers 21–0. For the first time since 2007, and for only the third time in the Bowl Championship Series era, no team from an automatic-qualifying BCS conference finished the season with an undefeated record.

== Rule changes ==
Several rule changes took effect this season:

- If a player is penalized for unsportsmanlike conduct for actions that occurred during a play ending in a touchdown, but before the goal line was crossed, the touchdown will be nullified and the fifteen-yard penalty enforced from the spot of the foul. This change was made the year after Georgia receiver A. J. Green was called for a personal foul after catching a pass for a touchdown against LSU. The fifteen-yard penalty was assessed on the resulting kickoff, which helped LSU's position for the winning score. In another game, North Dakota State defensive back Josh Gatlin pointed at the crowd at the seven-yard line before scoring a touchdown against South Dakota State. Gatlin received a penalty, but the touchdown was not taken back. A similar proposal that would have nullified touchdowns for taunting or excessive celebration after the score failed to pass the NCAA Football Rules Committee.
- Due to how the fourth quarter ended in the 2010 Music City Bowl, a 10-second runoff will be implemented (similar to the NFL rule adopted in 1980) when a team commits a foul in the final minute of either half that results in a clock stoppage. The opposing team has the option to:
  - Take the penalty yardage and the 10 second runoff.
  - Take the penalty yardage and decline the 10 second runoff.
  - Decline both the penalty and the 10 second runoff.
- Each half of a game can end due to a runoff of the game clock following a penalty. Teams can take a time-out to stop the clock and avoid the 10 second runoff. The new rule has been informally dubbed the "Dooley Rule", after then Tennessee head coach Derek Dooley.
- Video monitors will be allowed in coaches' booths to allow coaching staffs to determine whether they should challenge a call. The televisions will have access only to the live broadcast feed, with no video recorders. The technology, if made available at a stadium, must be provided to both teams.
- Players lined up outside the tackle box—more specifically, those lined up more than 7 yards from the center—will now be allowed to block below the waist only if they are blocking straight ahead or toward the nearest sideline.
- On placekicks, no offensive lineman can now be engaged by more than two defensive players. A violation will be a 5–yard penalty.
- A three-man wedge is prohibited during kickoffs and punts. The penalty will be a fifteen-yard penalty from the spot of the foul, if non-contact, or from the end of the run, if contact.
- Players will no longer be required to wear pants that cover the knees.
- The officials' uniforms were slightly changed. The shirt stripes are wider, they now wear black pants instead of white, and the initial of the official's role (ex. "R" for referee, "U" for umpire) is displayed on the front uniform pocket.

In addition, the NCAA recommends that conferences without a pregame warm-up policy should use a ten-yard, no-player zone between the 45-yard lines beginning 60 minutes before kickoff.

== Conference realignment ==
=== Membership changes ===
Five FBS schools switched conferences prior to the 2011 season. Each of these moves had been formally announced in 2010.

School	Former conference	New conference
Boise State	WAC	Mountain West
BYU	Mountain West	FBS independent (WCC in other sports)
Colorado	Big 12	Pac-12
Nebraska	Big 12	Big Ten
Utah	Mountain West	Pac-12

On April 20, 2011, UMass announced that it would upgrade its football program to the FBS level and become a football-only member of the Mid-American Conference beginning in 2012. Full FBS membership and eligibility for the conference championship and bowl games would follow in 2013.

On September 18, the Atlantic Coast Conference announced that Big East Conference mainstays Pittsburgh and Syracuse had been officially accepted as the conference's 13th and 14th members. At the time, the two schools' departure date was uncertain, as Big East bylaws require a 27-month notice period for departing members. The earliest that Pitt and Syracuse could join the ACC was July 2014, though later negotiations would allow Pitt and Syracuse to join in July 2013.

On September 26, the Southeastern Conference announced that Texas A&M would leave the Big 12 Conference and become the league's 13th member in July 2012. Missouri also announced plans to depart the Big 12 to join the SEC on November 6, bringing SEC conference membership to 14 schools.

Facing the imminent loss of four members, the Big 12 announced the addition of TCU from the Mountain West Conference on October 10. In order to join the Big 12, TCU had to renege on an agreement it had made less than year earlier to join the Big East.

On October 14, the Mountain West and Conference USA announced their intention to merge their football operations and form a two-division, 22-team conference in hopes of earning an automatic qualifier to a BCS bowl. The agreement was abandoned in 2012 after both conferences added new members.

The next change came on October 28, when the Big 12 formally accepted West Virginia from the Big East. This move led to a legal battle in which West Virginia filed suit against the Big East to overturn the standard 27-month notice period, and the Big East suing in another court to have the requirement enforced. In February 2012, the two parties reached a settlement that allowed West Virginia to join the Big 12 that July. Several months later, both Pittsburgh and Syracuse reached their own settlements with the Big East that allowed them to leave for the ACC in July 2013.

Changes in membership reduced the number of teams in the Big 12 from twelve to ten for the 2011 season and beyond, forcing the conference to drop its annual football championship game to comply with NCAA rules.

In response to the departures of three mainstay members and TCU, the Big East announced on December 7 that five schools would join the conference for football in 2013: Houston, SMU, and UCF would join as full members in all sports, while Boise State and San Diego State would leave the Mountain West and become football-only members. Boise State's other sports would return to the Western Athletic Conference, while San Diego State's would rejoin the Big West after a 35-year absence. Later developments in conference realignment, namely the demise of both the Big East and WAC's football competitions following the 2012 season, prompted both schools to abandon these plans and remain the Mountain West.

== New and updated stadiums ==
=== New stadiums ===
School	Name	Capacity
Florida Atlantic	FAU Stadium	30,000
North Texas	Apogee Stadium	30,850

=== Expanded stadium ===
- North Carolina continued renovations to Kenan Memorial Stadium, which were completed in time for the start of the season. The project included a new student center and premium seating sections. The addition of new seats enclosed the stadium for the first time and brought the total capacity to 63,000.

=== Temporary stadiums ===
- California played the season at AT&T Park in San Francisco, home to the San Francisco Giants of Major League Baseball. California Memorial Stadium, the Golden Bears' on-campus home since 1923, was undergoing a major renovation that included a full seismic retrofit. The Bears returned to Memorial Stadium in 2012. Although AT&T Park is primarily a baseball venue, it has hosted several football teams and events; at that time, it was home to the Fight Hunger Bowl.
- Washington played the first six games of its home schedule at on-campus Husky Stadium. Following the November 5 game against Oregon, construction began on a $280 million renovation project. As a result, the Apple Cup rivalry game with Washington State was moved to CenturyLink Field. Washington remained at CenturyLink Field for the entire 2012 season.

== Infractions, investigations, and scandals ==
=== Ohio State ===
Five Ohio State players were alleged to have improperly traded dozens of items to the owner of a tattoo parlor in exchange for tattoos, cash, and, in one case, a sport-utility vehicle. The players, along with head coach Jim Tressel, were suspended for the first five games of the 2011 season. Tressel was under investigation for lying to the university and investigators regarding his knowledge of the incident. The program was also under investigation by the NCAA, the school having going before the NCAA Committee on Infractions in August 2011, with findings and decisions following shortly thereafter. The scandal led to the resignation of Tressel on May 30. On June 8, starting quarterback Terrelle Pryor, one of the five suspended players, announced that he would forgo his final year of college eligibility.

Initially, Ohio State offered to vacate its entire 2010 season, return money received from the 2011 Sugar Bowl, impose two years of probation, and use five fewer football scholarships over the next three seasons. However, after the school went before the NCAA, further rules violations emerged. Three players were suspended before the start of the season for receiving $200 from a booster. Then, midway through the season, it was discovered that the same booster had overpaid several players for summer jobs.

The NCAA announced its final penalties on December 20. While accepting Ohio State's initial self-imposed penalties, it levied additional sanctions. One extra year of probation and scholarship reductions was added, running through the 2014 season. The Buckeyes will also be banned from postseason play in 2012. Tressel, who joined the staff of the Indianapolis Colts during the 2011 NFL season and has since taken a non-athletic position at his alma mater of the University of Akron, was hit with a five-year show-cause penalty, which effectively bars him from college coaching through the 2016 season. Finally, the school was required to disassociate itself from Pryor for five years.

=== North Carolina ===
The North Carolina Tar Heels, in the midst of an NCAA investigation into improper benefits and academic misconduct within the football program, fired head coach Butch Davis on July 27.

The school initially vacated its 2008 and 2009 seasons, reduced its scholarship allotment by nine over the next three seasons, and self-imposed two years of probation. Although the NCAA praised the university for its investigation, it found several aggravating factors. The NCAA confirmed academic fraud, found that players had received at least $31,000 in impermissible benefits, determined that six players had played while ineligible, and also found evidence of rampant agent involvement in the program. The NCAA added an extra year of probation, and also banned the Tar Heels from the 2012 postseason. John Blake, an assistant who had been forced out with Davis, was found to have received personal loans from agent Gary Wichard that he did not report to UNC, specifically for access to players. He was also cited for not cooperating with investigators. Blake received a three-year show-cause penalty.

=== Miami ===
On August 16, Yahoo! Sports broke a story in which former Miami Hurricanes booster Nevin Shapiro, currently imprisoned for running a Ponzi scheme, stated that from 2002 through 2010 he had given massive amounts of improper benefits to Miami players and coaches, mostly in football but also in men's basketball. Shapiro indicated that the benefits included cash, various goods, prostitutes, and even an abortion.

=== Penn State ===
On November 5, former Penn State assistant Jerry Sandusky was indicted on multiple felony charges of sex abuse against minors. Two other high-ranking Penn State administrators—athletic director Tim Curley and vice president for business and finance Gary Schultz (whose job includes supervision of the university police department)—were charged with perjury in the case. The day after the indictments, the university Board of Trustees held an emergency meeting, at which Curley requested to be placed on administrative leave and Schultz stepped down. Paterno, who had received notice of inappropriate behavior by Sandusky in 2002 and had reported the allegations to university administrators (though not to police), was not charged or implicated in any wrongdoing. On November 9, he announced his retirement effective at the end of the season, stating he was "absolutely devastated by the developments in this case." However, hours later, the Penn State Board of Trustees fired Paterno, effective immediately.

== Regular season top 10 matchups ==
Rankings reflect the AP Poll. Rankings for Week 8 and beyond will list BCS Rankings first and AP Poll second. Teams that failed to be a top 10 team for one poll or the other will be noted.

- Week 1
  - No. 4 LSU defeated No. 3 Oregon, 40–27 (Cowboys Stadium, Arlington, Texas)
- Week 3
  - No. 1 Oklahoma defeated No. 5 Florida State, 23–13 (Doak Campbell Stadium, Tallahassee, Florida)
- Week 4
  - No. 7 Oklahoma State defeated No. 8 Texas A&M, 30–29 (Kyle Field, College Station, Texas)
- Week 5
  - No. 7 Wisconsin defeated No. 8 Nebraska, 48–17 (Camp Randall Stadium, Madison, Wisconsin)
- Week 9
  - No. 9/11 Oklahoma defeated No. 8/10 Kansas State, 58–17 (KSU Stadium, Manhattan, Kansas)
- Week 10
  - No. 1/1 LSU defeated No. 2/2 Alabama, 9–6 ^{OT} (Bryant–Denny Stadium, Tuscaloosa, Alabama)
  - No. 7/8 Arkansas defeated No. 9/10 South Carolina, 44–28 (Donald W. Reynolds Razorback Stadium, Fayetteville, Arkansas)
- Week 11
  - No. 6/7 Oregon defeated No. 4/3 Stanford, 53–30 (Stanford Stadium, Stanford, California)
- Week 13
  - No. 1/1 LSU defeated No. 3/3 Arkansas, 41–17 (Tiger Stadium, Baton Rouge, Louisiana)
- Week 14
  - No. 3/3 Oklahoma State defeated No. 10/13 Oklahoma, 44–10 (Boone Pickens Stadium, Stillwater, Oklahoma)

== Conference standings ==
2011 Atlantic Coast Conference football standings
	Conf.			Overall
Team	W		L	W		L
Atlantic Division
No. 22 Clemson x$	6	–	2	10	–	4
Wake Forest	5	–	3	6	–	7
No. 23 Florida State	5	–	3	9	–	4
NC State	4	–	4	8	–	5
Boston College	3	–	5	4	–	8
Maryland	1	–	7	2	–	10
Coastal Division
No. 21 Virginia Tech x%	7	–	1	11	–	3
Virginia	5	–	3	8	–	5
Georgia Tech	5	–	3	8	–	5
Miami (FL)	3	–	5	6	–	6
North Carolina	3	–	5	7	–	6
Duke	1	–	7	3	–	9
Championship: Clemson 38, Virginia Tech 10
$ – BCS representative as conference champion; % – BCS at-large representative; x – Division champion/co-champions; Rankings from AP Poll

2011 Big East Conference football standings
	Conf.			Overall
Team	W		L	W		L
No. 17 West Virginia $+	5	–	2	10	–	3
No. 25 Cincinnati +	5	–	2	10	–	3
Louisville +	5	–	2	7	–	6
Rutgers	4	–	3	9	–	4
Pittsburgh	4	–	3	6	–	7
Connecticut	3	–	4	5	–	7
South Florida	1	–	6	5	–	7
Syracuse	1	–	6	5	–	7
$ – BCS representative as conference champion; + – Conference co-champions; As of January 11, 2012; Rankings from AP Poll

2011 Big Ten Conference football standings
	Conf.			Overall
Team	W		L	W		L
Legends Division
No. 11 Michigan State x	7	–	1	11	–	3
No. 12 Michigan %	6	–	2	11	–	2
No. 24 Nebraska	5	–	3	9	–	4
Iowa	4	–	4	7	–	6
Northwestern	3	–	5	6	–	7
Minnesota	2	–	6	3	–	9
Leaders Division
No. 10 Wisconsin xy$	6	–	2	11	–	3
Penn State x	6	–	2	9	–	4
Purdue	4	–	4	7	–	6
Ohio State	3	–	5	6	–	7
Illinois	2	–	6	7	–	6
Indiana	0	–	8	1	–	11
Championship: Wisconsin 42, Michigan State 39
$ – BCS representative as conference champion; % – BCS at-large representative; x – Division champion/co-champions; y – Championship game participant; Rankings from AP Poll

2011 Big 12 Conference football standings
	Conf.			Overall
Team	W		L	W		L
No. 3 Oklahoma State $	8	–	1	12	–	1
No. 15 Kansas State	7	–	2	10	–	3
No. 13 Baylor	6	–	3	10	–	3
No. 16 Oklahoma	6	–	3	10	–	3
Missouri	5	–	4	8	–	5
Texas	4	–	5	8	–	5
Texas A&M	4	–	5	7	–	6
Iowa State	3	–	6	6	–	7
Texas Tech	2	–	7	5	–	7
Kansas	0	–	9	2	–	10
$ – BCS representative as conference champion; Rankings from AP Poll

2011 Conference USA football standings
	Conf.			Overall
Team	W		L	W		L
East Division
No. 20 Southern Miss x$	6	–	2	12	–	2
Marshall	5	–	3	7	–	6
East Carolina	4	–	4	5	–	7
UAB	3	–	5	3	–	9
UCF	3	–	5	5	–	7
Memphis	1	–	7	2	–	10
West Division
No. 18 Houston x	8	–	0	13	–	1
Tulsa	7	–	1	8	–	5
SMU	5	–	3	8	–	5
Rice	3	–	5	4	–	8
UTEP	2	–	6	5	–	7
Tulane	1	–	7	2	–	11
Championship: Southern Miss 49, Houston 28
$ – Conference champion; x – Division champion/co-champions; As of January 10, 2012; Rankings from AP Poll

2011 Mid-American Conference football standings
	Conf.			Overall
Team	W		L	W		L
East Division
Ohio xy	6	–	2	10	–	4
Temple	5	–	3	9	–	4
Kent State	4	–	4	5	–	7
Bowling Green	3	–	5	5	–	7
Miami (OH)	3	–	5	4	–	8
Buffalo	2	–	6	3	–	9
Akron	0	–	8	1	–	11
West Division
Northern Illinois xy$	7	–	1	11	–	3
Toledo x	7	–	1	9	–	4
Western Michigan	5	–	3	7	–	6
Ball State	4	–	4	6	–	6
Eastern Michigan	4	–	4	6	–	6
Central Michigan	2	–	6	3	–	9
Championship: Northern Illinois 23, Ohio 20
$ – Conference champion; x – Division champion/co-champions; y – Championship game participant

2011 Mountain West Conference football standings
	Conf.			Overall
Team	W		L	W		L
No. 14 TCU $	7	–	0	11	–	2
No. 8 Boise State	6	–	1	12	–	1
Wyoming	5	–	2	8	–	5
San Diego State	4	–	3	8	–	5
Air Force	3	–	4	7	–	6
Colorado State	1	–	6	3	–	9
UNLV	1	–	6	2	–	10
New Mexico	1	–	6	1	–	11
$ – Conference champion; Rankings from AP Poll

2011 Pac-12 Conference football standings
	Conf.			Overall
Team	W		L	W		L
North Division
No. 4 Oregon xy$	8	–	1	12	–	2
No. 7 Stanford x%	8	–	1	11	–	2
Washington	5	–	4	7	–	6
California	4	–	5	7	–	6
Oregon State	3	–	6	3	–	9
Washington State	2	–	7	4	–	8
South Division
No. 6 USC †	7	–	2	10	–	2
UCLA xy	5	–	4	6	–	8
Utah	4	–	5	8	–	5
Arizona State	4	–	5	6	–	7
Arizona	2	–	7	4	–	8
Colorado	2	–	7	3	–	10
Championship: Oregon 49, UCLA 31
$ – BCS representative as conference champion; % – BCS at-large representative; x – Division champion/co-champions; y – Championship game participant; † – USC ineligible for championship and postseason due to NCAA sanctions; Rankings from AP Poll

2011 Southeastern Conference football standings
	Conf.			Overall
Team	W		L	W		L
Eastern Division
No. 19 Georgia x	7	–	1	10	–	4
No. 9 South Carolina	6	–	2	11	–	2
Florida	3	–	5	7	–	6
Vanderbilt	2	–	6	6	–	7
Kentucky	2	–	6	5	–	7
Tennessee	1	–	7	5	–	7
Western Division
No. 2 LSU x$	8	–	0	13	–	1
No. 1 Alabama %#	7	–	1	12	–	1
No. 5 Arkansas	6	–	2	11	–	2
Auburn	4	–	4	8	–	5
Mississippi State	2	–	6	7	–	6
Ole Miss*	0	–	8	2	–	10
Championship: LSU 42, Georgia 10
# – BCS National Champion; $ – BCS representative as conference champion; % – BCS at-large representative; x – Division champion/co-champions; * Ole Miss vacated all wins due to NCAA violations.; Rankings from AP Poll

2011 Sun Belt Conference football standings
	Conf.			Overall
Team	W		L	W		L
Arkansas State $	8	–	0	10	–	3
Western Kentucky	7	–	1	7	–	5
FIU	5	–	3	8	–	5
North Texas	4	–	4	5	–	7
Louisiana–Monroe	3	–	5	4	–	8
Troy	2	–	6	3	–	9
Louisiana–Lafayette *	1	–	2	1	–	4
Middle Tennessee	1	–	7	2	–	10
Florida Atlantic	0	–	8	1	–	11
$ – Conference champion; * – Louisiana–Lafayette vacated 8 wins including 5 in conference due to NCAA violations.

2011 Western Athletic Conference football standings
	Conf.			Overall
Team	W		L	W		L
Louisiana Tech $	6	–	1	8	–	5
Nevada	5	–	2	7	–	6
Utah State	5	–	2	7	–	6
Hawaii	3	–	4	6	–	7
San Jose State	3	–	4	5	–	7
Fresno State	3	–	4	4	–	9
New Mexico State	2	–	5	4	–	9
Idaho	1	–	6	2	–	10
$ – Conference champion

2011 NCAA Division I FBS independents football records
	Conf.			Overall
Team	W		L	W		L
BYU		–		10	–	3
Notre Dame		–		8	–	5
Navy		–		5	–	7
Army		–		3	–	9
Rankings from AP Poll

== FCS team wins over FBS teams ==
Italics denotes FCS teams.

Date	Visiting team	Home team	Site	Result	Attendance	Ref.
September 3	No. 16 (FCS) Richmond	Duke	Wallace Wade Stadium • Durham, North Carolina	23–21	32,741	
September 3	No. 24 (FCS) Sacramento State	Oregon State	Reser Stadium • Corvallis, Oregon	29–28 ^{OT}	41,581	
September 17	Indiana State	Western Kentucky	Houchens Industries–L. T. Smith Stadium • Bowling Green, Kentucky	44–16	15,793	
September 24	No. 8 (FCS) North Dakota State	Minnesota	TCF Bank Stadium • Minneapolis, Minnesota	37–24	48,802	
September 24	No. 20 (FCS) Sam Houston State	New Mexico	University Stadium • Albuquerque, New Mexico	48–45 ^{OT}	16,313	
September 24	No. 23 (FCS) Southern Utah	UNLV	Sam Boyd Stadium • Whitney, Nevada	41–16	18,102	
^{#}Rankings from AP Poll released prior to game.

== Conference summaries ==
Rankings reflect the Week 14 AP Poll before the games were played.

=== Conference championship games ===
Conference	Champion	Runner-Up	Score	Offensive Player of the Year	Defensive Player of the Year	Coach of the Year
ACC	No. 21 Clemson	No. 5 Virginia Tech	38–10	David Wilson, Virginia Tech	Luke Kuechly, Boston College	Mike London, Virginia
Big Ten	No. 15 Wisconsin	No. 11 Michigan State	42–39	Montee Ball, Wisconsin	Devon Still, Penn State	Brady Hoke, Michigan
C-USA	No. 24 Southern Miss	No. 7 Houston	49–28	Case Keenum, Houston (MVP); Patrick Edwards, Houston	Vinny Curry, Marshall	Kevin Sumlin, Houston
MAC	Northern Illinois	Ohio	23–20	Chandler Harnish, Northern Illinois	Drew Nowak, Western Michigan	Ron English, Eastern Michigan
Pac-12	No. 8 Oregon	UCLA	49–31	Andrew Luck, Stanford	Mychal Kendricks, California	David Shaw, Stanford
SEC	No. 1 LSU	No. 12 Georgia	42–10	Trent Richardson, Alabama	Tyrann Mathieu, LSU	Les Miles, LSU

=== Other conference champions ===
Conference	Champion	Record	Offensive Player of the Year	Defensive Player of the Year	Coach of the Year
Big 12	No. 3 Oklahoma State	11–1 (8–1)	Robert Griffin III, Baylor	A. J. Klein, Iowa State & Frank Alexander, Oklahoma	Bill Snyder, Kansas State
Big East	Cincinnati; Louisville #22 West Virginia	9–3 (5–2) 7–5 (5–2) 9–3 (5–2)	Isaiah Pead, Cincinnati	Khaseem Greene, Rutgers & Derrick Wolfe, Cincinnati	Butch Jones, Cincinnati
MWC	No. 18 TCU	10–2 (7–0)	Kellen Moore, Boise State	Tank Carder, TCU	Dave Christensen, Wyoming
Sun Belt	Arkansas State	10–2 (8–0)	Ryan Aplin, Arkansas State	Brandon Joiner, Arkansas State	Hugh Freeze, Arkansas State
WAC	Louisiana Tech	8–4 (5–1)	Robert Turbin, Utah State	Adrien Cole, Louisiana Tech	Sonny Dykes, Louisiana Tech

== Final BCS rankings ==
BCS	School	Record	Bowl Game
1	LSU	13–0	BCS Championship
2	Alabama	11–1	BCS Championship
3	Oklahoma State	11–1	Fiesta
4	Stanford	11–1	Fiesta
5	Oregon	11–2	Rose
6	Arkansas	10–2	Cotton
7	Boise State	11–1	Las Vegas
8	Kansas State	10–2	Cotton
9	South Carolina	10–2	Capital One
10	Wisconsin	11–2	Rose
11	Virginia Tech	11–2	Sugar
12	Baylor	9–3	Alamo
13	Michigan	10–2	Sugar
14	Oklahoma	9–3	Insight
15	Clemson	10–3	Orange
16	Georgia	10–3	Outback
17	Michigan State	10–3	Outback
18	TCU	10–2	Poinsettia
19	Houston	12–1	TicketCity
20	Nebraska	9–3	Capital One
21	Southern Miss	11–2	Hawai'i
22	Penn State	9–3	TicketCity
23	West Virginia	9–3	Orange
24	Texas	7–5	Holiday
25	Auburn	7–5	Chick-fil-A

== Bowl games ==
=== 2012 Bowl Championship Series ===
Date	Game	Site	Television	Teams	Affiliations	Winner
Jan. 2	Rose Bowl presented by Vizio	Rose Bowl; Pasadena, CA; 5:00 pm	ESPN	No. 10 Wisconsin Badgers (11–2); No. 5 Oregon Ducks (11–2)	Big Ten; Pac-12	Oregon 45–38
Jan. 2	Tostitos Fiesta Bowl	University of Phoenix Stadium; Glendale, AZ; 8:30 pm	ESPN	No. 3 Oklahoma State Cowboys (11–1); No. 4 Stanford Cardinal (11–1)	Big 12; Pac-12	Oklahoma State 41–38 (OT)
Jan. 3	Allstate Sugar Bowl	Mercedes-Benz Superdome; New Orleans, LA; 8:30 pm	ESPN	No. 13 Michigan Wolverines (10–2); No. 11 Virginia Tech Hokies (11–2)	Big Ten; ACC	Michigan 23–20 (OT)
Jan. 4	Discover Orange Bowl	Sun Life Stadium; Miami Gardens, FL; 8:30 pm	ESPN	No. 15 Clemson Tigers (10–3); No. 23 West Virginia Mountaineers (9–3)	ACC; Big East	West Virginia 70–33
Jan. 9	Allstate BCS National Championship Game	Mercedes-Benz Superdome; New Orleans, LA; 8:30 pm	ESPN	No. 1 LSU Tigers (13–0); No. 2 Alabama Crimson Tide (11–1)	SEC; SEC	Alabama 21–0

=== Other bowl games ===
Date	Game	Site	Television	Teams	Affiliations	Results
Dec. 17	Gildan New Mexico Bowl	University Stadium; University of New Mexico; Albuquerque, NM; 2:00 pm	ESPN	Wyoming Cowboys (8–4); Temple Owls (8–4)	MWC; MAC	Temple 37–15
Dec. 17	Famous Idaho Potato Bowl	Bronco Stadium; Boise State University; Boise, ID; 5:30 pm	ESPN	Ohio Bobcats (9–4); Utah State Aggies (7–5)	MAC; WAC	Ohio 24–23
Dec. 17	R+L Carriers New Orleans Bowl	Mercedes-Benz Superdome; New Orleans, LA; 9:00 pm	ESPN	San Diego State Aztecs (8–4); Louisiana–Lafayette Ragin' Cajuns (8–4)	MWC; Sun Belt	Louisiana–Lafayette 32–30
Dec. 20	Beef 'O' Brady's Bowl St. Petersburg	Tropicana Field; St. Petersburg, FL; 8:00 pm	ESPN	FIU Golden Panthers (8–4); Marshall Thundering Herd (6–6)	Sun Belt; C-USA	Marshall 20–10
Dec. 21	San Diego County Credit Union Poinsettia Bowl	Snapdragon Stadium; San Diego, CA; 8:00 pm	ESPN	No. 18 TCU Horned Frogs (10–2); Louisiana Tech Bulldogs (8–4)	MWC; WAC	TCU 31–24
Dec. 22	Maaco Bowl Las Vegas	Sam Boyd Stadium; University of Nevada, Las Vegas; Whitney, NV; 8:00 pm	ESPN	No. 7 Boise State Broncos (11–1); Arizona State Sun Devils (6–6)	MWC; Pac-12	Boise State 56–24
Dec. 24	Sheraton Hawaiʻi Bowl	Aloha Stadium; Honolulu, HI; 8:00 pm	ESPN	Nevada Wolf Pack (7–5); No. 21 Southern Miss Golden Eagles (11–2)	WAC; C-USA	Southern Miss 24–17
Dec. 26	Advocare Independence Bowl	Independence Stadium; Shreveport, LA; 5:00 pm	ESPN2	Missouri Tigers (7–5); North Carolina Tar Heels (7–5)	Big 12; ACC	Missouri 41–24
Dec. 27	Little Caesars Pizza Bowl	Ford Field; Detroit, MI; 4:30 pm	ESPN	Purdue Boilermakers (6–6); Western Michigan Broncos (7–5)	Big Ten; MAC	Purdue 37–32
Dec. 27	Belk Bowl	Bank of America Stadium; Charlotte, NC; 8:00 pm	ESPN	North Carolina State Wolfpack (7–5); Louisville Cardinals (7–5)	ACC; Big East	NC State 31–24
Dec. 28	Military Bowl presented by Northrop Grumman	RFK Stadium; Washington, DC; 4:30 pm	ESPN	Air Force Falcons (7–5); Toledo Rockets (8–4) (Note: Navy, which had the primary contract for this slot, was not bowl-eligible. For the 2011 season, the TicketCity Bowl and Military Bowl have contingency contracts with the Big 12 if those games' primary partners are not available. Since the TicketCity Bowl's primary partners (the Big Ten and C-USA) both filled their slots, Navy's Military Bowl slot was passed to the Big 12; however the Big 12 did not have enough teams to fulfill their contract, so Toledo from the MAC was invited.)	MWC; MAC	Toledo 42–41
Dec. 28	Bridgepoint Education Holiday Bowl	Snapdragon Stadium; San Diego, CA; 8:00 pm	ESPN	No. 24 Texas Longhorns (7–5); California Golden Bears (7–5)	Big 12; Pac-12	Texas 21–10
Dec. 29	Champs Sports Bowl	Citrus Bowl; Orlando, FL; 5:30 pm	ESPN	Florida State Seminoles (8–4); Notre Dame Fighting Irish (8–4)	ACC; Independent	Florida State 18–14
Dec. 29	Valero Alamo Bowl	Alamodome; San Antonio, TX; 9:00 pm	ESPN	No. 12 Baylor Bears (9–3); Washington Huskies (7–5)	Big 12; Pac-12	Baylor 67–56
Dec. 30	Bell Helicopters Armed Forces Bowl	Gerald J. Ford Stadium; University Park, TX; 12:00 pm	ESPN	BYU Cougars (9–3); Tulsa Golden Hurricane (8–4)	Independent; C-USA	BYU 24–21
Dec. 30	New Era Pinstripe Bowl	Yankee Stadium; Bronx, NY; 3:20 pm	ESPN	Iowa State Cyclones (6–6); Rutgers Scarlet Knights (8–4)	Big 12; Big East	Rutgers 27–13
Dec. 30	Franklin American Mortgage Music City Bowl	LP Field; Nashville, TN; 6:40 pm	ESPN	Wake Forest Demon Deacons (6–6); Mississippi State Bulldogs (6–6)	ACC; SEC	Mississippi State 23–17
Dec. 30	Insight Bowl	Sun Devil Stadium; Tempe, AZ; 10:00 pm	ESPN	Iowa Hawkeyes (7–5); No. 14 Oklahoma Sooners (9–3)	Big Ten; Big 12	Oklahoma 31–14
Dec. 31	Meineke Car Care Bowl of Texas	Reliant Stadium; Houston, TX; 12:00 pm	ESPN	Texas A&M Aggies (6–6); Northwestern Wildcats (6–6)	Big 12; Big Ten	Texas A&M 33–22
Dec. 31	Hyundai Sun Bowl	Sun Bowl Stadium; University of Texas El Paso; El Paso, TX; 2:00 pm	CBS	Georgia Tech Yellow Jackets (8–4); Utah Utes (7–5)	ACC; Pac-12	Utah 30–27 (OT)
Dec. 31	AutoZone Liberty Bowl	Liberty Bowl Memorial Stadium; Memphis, TN; 3:30 pm	ABC	Cincinnati Bearcats (9–3); Vanderbilt Commodores (6–6)	Big East; SEC	Cincinnati 31–24
Dec. 31	Kraft Fight Hunger Bowl	AT&T Park; San Francisco, CA; 3:30 pm	ESPN	Illinois Fighting Illini (6–6) (Note: Army, which had the primary contract for this slot, was not bowl-eligible. The ACC had a contingency contract for the slot, but could only fill it if it produced nine bowl-eligible teams. Miami's self-imposed bowl ban made it impossible for the conference to fill that slot.); UCLA Bruins (6–7)	Big Ten; Pac-12	Illinois 20–14
Dec. 31	Chick-fil-A Bowl	Georgia Dome; Atlanta, GA; 7:30 pm	ESPN	No. 25 Auburn Tigers (7–5); Virginia Cavaliers (8–4)	SEC; ACC	Auburn 43–24
Jan. 2	TicketCity Bowl	Cotton Bowl; Dallas, TX; 12:00 pm	ESPNU	No. 22 Penn State Nittany Lions (9–3); No. 19 Houston Cougars (12–1)	Big Ten; C-USA	Houston 30–14
Jan. 2	Outback Bowl	Raymond James Stadium; Tampa, FL; 1:00 pm	ABC	No. 17 Michigan State Spartans (10–3); No. 16 Georgia Bulldogs (10–3)	Big Ten; SEC	Michigan State 33–30 (3OT)
Jan. 2	Capital One Bowl	Citrus Bowl; Orlando, FL; 1:00 pm	ESPN	No. 20 Nebraska Cornhuskers (9–3); No. 9 South Carolina Gamecocks (10–2)	Big Ten; SEC	South Carolina 30–13
Jan. 2	TaxSlayer.com Gator Bowl	EverBank Field; Jacksonville, FL; 1:00 pm	ESPN2	Ohio State Buckeyes (6–6); Florida Gators (6–6)	Big Ten; SEC	Florida 24–17
Jan. 6	AT&T Cotton Bowl Classic	Cowboys Stadium; Arlington, TX; 8:00 pm	FOX	No. 8 Kansas State Wildcats (10–2); No. 6 Arkansas Razorbacks (10–2)	Big 12; SEC	Arkansas 29–16
Jan. 7	BBVA Compass Bowl	Legion Field; Birmingham, AL; 1:00 pm	ESPN	SMU Mustangs (7–5); Pittsburgh Panthers (6–6)	C-USA; Big East	SMU 28–6
Jan. 8	GoDaddy.com Bowl	Ladd–Peebles Stadium; Mobile, AL; 9:00 pm	ESPN	Northern Illinois Huskies (10–3); Arkansas State Red Wolves (10–2)	MAC; Sun Belt	Northern Illinois 38–20

=== Bowl Challenge Cup standings ===
Conference	Wins	Losses	Pct.
C-USA	4	1	.800
MAC	4	1	.800
Big 12	6	2	.750
SEC	6	3	.666
Big East	3	2	.600
Division I FBS Independents	1	1	.500
Big Ten	4	6	.400
MWC	2	3	.400
Sun Belt	1	2	.333
Pac-12	2	5	.286
ACC	2	6	.250
WAC	0	3	.000

== Awards and honors ==
=== Heisman Trophy voting ===
The Heisman Trophy is given to the year's most outstanding player

Player	School	Position	1st	2nd	3rd	Total
Robert Griffin III	Baylor	QB	405	168	136	1,687
Andrew Luck	Stanford	QB	247	250	166	1,407
Trent Richardson	Alabama	RB	138	207	150	978
Montee Ball	Wisconsin	RB	22	83	116	348
Tyrann Mathieu	LSU	CB	34	63	99	327
Matt Barkley	USC	QB	11	33	54	153
Case Keenum	Houston	QB	10	20	53	123
Kellen Moore	Boise State	QB	6	21	30	90
Russell Wilson	Wisconsin	QB	4	12	15	52
LaMichael James	Oregon	RB	5	12	9	48

=== Other major awards ===
- AP Player of the Year: Robert Griffin III, Baylor
- Maxwell Award (top player): Andrew Luck, Stanford
- Walter Camp Award (top player): Andrew Luck, Stanford
- Campbell Trophy ("academic Heisman"; formerly the Draddy Trophy): Andrew Rodriguez, Army
- Wuerffel Trophy (humanitarian-athlete): Barrett Jones, Alabama
- Paul Hornung Award (most versatile player): Brandon Boykin, Georgia
- Burlsworth Trophy (top player who began as walk-on): Austin Davis, Southern Miss

=== Offense ===
Quarterback

- Davey O'Brien Award (quarterback): Robert Griffin III, Baylor
- Johnny Unitas Award (senior/4th year quarterback): Andrew Luck, Stanford
- Manning Award (quarterback): Robert Griffin III, Baylor
- Sammy Baugh Trophy (quarterback, specifically passer): Case Keenum, Houston

Running Back

- Doak Walker Award (running back): Trent Richardson, Alabama

Wide Receiver

- Fred Biletnikoff Award (wide receiver): Justin Blackmon, Oklahoma State

Tight End

- John Mackey Award (tight end): Dwayne Allen, Clemson

Lineman

- Dave Rimington Trophy (center): David Molk, Michigan
- Outland Trophy (interior lineman): Barrett Jones, Alabama

=== Defense ===
- Bronko Nagurski Trophy (defensive player): Luke Kuechly, Boston College
- Chuck Bednarik Award (defensive player): Tyrann Mathieu, LSU
- Lott Trophy (defensive impact): Luke Kuechly, Boston College

Defensive Line

- Ted Hendricks Award (defensive end): Whitney Mercilus, Illinois
- Lombardi Award (defensive lineman): Luke Kuechly, Boston College

Linebacker

- Dick Butkus Award (linebacker): Luke Kuechly, Boston College

Defensive Back

- Jim Thorpe Award (defensive back): Morris Claiborne, LSU

=== Special teams ===
- Lou Groza Award (placekicker): Randy Bullock, Texas A&M
- Ray Guy Award (punter): Ryan Allen, Louisiana Tech

=== Coaches ===
- AP Coach of the Year: Les Miles, LSU
- Paul "Bear" Bryant Award: Mike Gundy, Oklahoma State
- The Home Depot Coach of the Year Award: Les Miles, LSU
- Walter Camp Coach of the Year: Les Miles, LSU
- Eddie Robinson Coach of the Year: Mike Gundy, Oklahoma State
- Bobby Dodd Coach of the Year Award: Dabo Swinney, Clemson
- Bobby Bowden National Collegiate Coach of the Year Award: Nick Saban, Alabama

Assistant

- Broyles Award (assistant coach): John Chavis, LSU

== Records ==
- Several significant records were tied or broken on October 22:
  - East Carolina quarterback Dominique Davis set two FBS records for consecutive pass completions in the Pirates' 38–35 win over Navy.
    - Davis completed his first 26 pass attempts, breaking the single-game record of 23 first set in 1998 by Tee Martin of Tennessee against South Carolina and tied in 2004 by Aaron Rodgers of California against USC.
    - Since Davis had also completed his final 10 passes in the Pirates' game the previous week against Memphis, his streak against Navy gave him a total of 36 consecutive completions over two games, breaking the record of 26 set by Rodgers in 2004.
  - Boise State quarterback Kellen Moore led the Broncos to a 37–26 win over Air Force, giving him 45 career wins as a starter. This tied the FBS record of Texas' Colt McCoy (2006–2009); after a bye week, Moore could (and ultimately did) take sole possession of the record at UNLV on November 5. He finished his career 50–3.
  - In Houston's 63–28 win over Marshall, Cougars quarterback Case Keenum set a new FBS record for career total offense, surpassing the 16,910 yards amassed by Timmy Chang of Hawaiʻi from 2000 to 2004. He also brought his career total of touchdowns accounted for (combined passing, rushing, receiving, and returns) to 150, tying the record set by Central Michigan's Dan LeFevour from 2006 to 2009.
  - Penn State head coach Joe Paterno, already the holder of the record for most career wins in FBS, tied Eddie Robinson of Grambling for the most wins in Division I history, with 408, when the Nittany Lions defeated Northwestern 34–24. Paterno, in what would prove to be his final game coached, would claim the record outright the following week, when Penn State defeated Illinois in a defensive struggle, 10–7.
- On October 27, Keenum's nine touchdown passes in Houston's 73–34 win over crosstown rival Rice gave him 139 for his college career, surpassing the previous record of 134 by Texas Tech's Graham Harrell from 2005 to 2008. He also took sole possession of the record for most touchdowns accounted for, with 159 (and counting).
- On October 29, Paterno took sole possession of the record for most career wins by a Division I head coach when Penn State defeated Illinois 10–7. This would prove to be Paterno's final game, as he would be fired less than two weeks later in the midst of a sexual abuse scandal (more details below).
- On November 5:
  - In Houston's 56–13 pasting of UAB, Keenum broke Chang's record for career passing yards, ending the game with 17,212.
  - Boise State defeated UNLV 48–21, giving Moore his 46th career win as a starter and sole possession of that record.
- On November 19, Keenum added another major FBS record to his collection, surpassing Harrell's previous record of 1,403 career completions in the first quarter of Houston's 37–7 win over SMU. Keenum ended with 1,427 completions.
- On November 26, Kentucky defeated Tennessee for the first time since 1984. The Wildcats' 10–7 win ended the longest current losing streak against an annual opponent in FBS at 26.

== Coaching changes ==
=== Preseason and in-season ===
This is restricted to coaching changes that took place on or after May 1, 2011. For coaching changes that occurred earlier in 2011, see 2010 NCAA Division I FBS end-of-season coaching changes.

Team	Outgoing coach	Date	Reason	Replacement
Ohio State	Jim Tressel	May 30	Resigned	Luke Fickell (interim)
West Virginia	Bill Stewart	June 10	Resigned	Dana Holgorsen
North Carolina	Butch Davis	July 27	Fired	Everett Withers (interim)
New Mexico	Mike Locksley	September 25	Fired	George Barlow (interim)
Arizona	Mike Stoops	October 10	Fired	Tim Kish (interim)
Tulane	Bob Toledo	October 18	Resigned	Mark Hutson (interim)
Penn State	Joe Paterno	November 9	Fired	Tom Bradley (interim)

=== End of season ===
Team	Outgoing coach	Date announced	Reason	Replacement
Florida Atlantic	Howard Schnellenberger	August 11	Retired	Carl Pelini
Ole Miss	Houston Nutt	November 7	Resigned	Hugh Freeze
New Mexico	George Barlow (interim)	November 16	Permanent replacement	Bob Davie
Arizona	Tim Kish (interim)	November 21	Permanent replacement	Rich Rodriguez
Akron	Rob Ianello	November 26	Fired	Terry Bowden
Memphis	Larry Porter	November 27	Fired	Justin Fuente
Illinois	Ron Zook	November 27	Fired	Tim Beckman
UAB	Neil Callaway	November 27	Fired	Garrick McGee
Kansas	Turner Gill	November 27	Fired	Charlie Weis
Arizona State	Dennis Erickson	November 27	Fired	Todd Graham
Ohio State	Luke Fickell (interim)	November 28	Permanent replacement	Urban Meyer
UCLA	Rick Neuheisel	November 28	Fired	Jim Mora
Washington State	Paul Wulff	November 29	Fired	Mike Leach
Texas A&M	Mike Sherman	December 1	Fired	Kevin Sumlin
Colorado State	Steve Fairchild	December 4	Fired	Jim McElwain
Fresno State	Pat Hill	December 4	Fired	Tim DeRuyter
Tulane	Mark Hutson (interim)	December 5	Permanent replacement	Curtis Johnson
Arkansas State	Hugh Freeze	December 5	Hired by Ole Miss	Gus Malzahn
Hawaiʻi	Greg McMackin	December 5	Retired	Norm Chow
North Carolina	Everett Withers (interim)	December 7	Permanent replacement	Larry Fedora
Southern Miss	Larry Fedora	December 7	Hired by North Carolina	Ellis Johnson
Toledo	Tim Beckman	December 9	Hired by Illinois	Matt Campbell
Houston	Kevin Sumlin	December 10	Hired by Texas A&M	Tony Levine
Pittsburgh	Todd Graham	December 14	Hired by Arizona State	Paul Chryst
Penn State	Tom Bradley (interim)	January 5	Permanent replacement	Bill O'Brien
Rutgers	Greg Schiano	January 26	Hired by Tampa Bay Buccaneers	Kyle Flood
Arkansas	Bobby Petrino	April 10	Fired	John L. Smith

== TV ratings ==
=== Most watched regular season games in 2011 ===
Rank	Date	Matchup	Channel	Viewers
1	November 5, 8:00 ET	No. 1 LSU vs. No. 2 Alabama (Game of the Century (2011))	CBS	20.01 Million
2	December 3, 4:00 ET	No. 1 LSU vs. No. 14 Georgia	CBS	12.01 Million
3	November 25, 2:30 ET	No. 3 Arkansas vs. No. 1 LSU	CBS	10.44 Million
4	November 19, 8:00 ET	USC vs. No. 4 Oregon, No. 5 Oklahoma vs. No. 22 Baylor	Regional ESPN on ABC	9.74 Million
5	September 17, 8:00 ET	No. 1 Oklahoma vs. No. 5 Florida State	ESPN on ABC	9.31 Million
6	November 12, 8:00 ET	No. 7 Oregon vs. No. 4 Stanford	ESPN on ABC	8.73 Million
7	October 29, 8:00 ET	No. 5 Clemson vs. Georgia Tech, No. 6 Stanford vs. USC	Regional ESPN on ABC	8.43 Million
8	November 26, 12:00 ET	Ohio State vs. No. 15 Michigan	ESPN on ABC	7.96 Million
9	December 3, 8:15 ET	No. 15 Wisconsin vs. No. 13 Michigan State	FOX	7.77 Million
10	September 3, 8:00 ET	No. 4 LSU vs. No. 3 Oregon	ESPN on ABC	7.75 Million
Special	December 10, 2:30 ET	Army vs. Navy	CBS	5.50 Million

== Attendances ==
#	Team	Games	Total	Average
1	Michigan	8	897,431	112,179
2	Ohio State	7	736,618	105,231
3	Alabama	7	712,747	101,821
4	Penn State	7	709,991	101,427
5	Texas	6	603,142	100,524
6	Tennessee	8	757,136	94,642
7	LSU	6	557,210	92,868
8	Georgia	6	555,676	92,613
9	Florida	7	623,429	89,061
10	Texas A&M	7	610,283	87,183
11	Auburn	7	600,541	85,792
12	Nebraska	7	596,871	85,267
13	Oklahoma	6	510,967	85,161
14	Notre Dame	6	484,770	80,795
15	Wisconsin	7	558,692	79,813
16	South Carolina	7	553,915	79,131
17	Clemson	7	545,713	77,959
18	Florida State	7	544,893	77,842
19	Southern California	7	523,644	74,806
20	Michigan State	7	518,545	74,078
21	Iowa	7	494,095	70,585
22	Arkansas	7	468,933	66,990
23	Virginia Tech	6	397,398	66,233
24	Washington	7	437,715	62,531
25	Missouri	6	372,571	62,095
26	BYU	7	421,858	60,265
27	Kentucky	7	420,052	60,007
28	Oregon	8	474,753	59,344
29	Arizona State	7	413,051	59,007
30	Oklahoma State	6	343,376	57,229
31	UCLA	6	339,861	56,644
32	West Virginia	7	395,726	56,532
33	Mississippi	7	395,413	56,488
34	North Carolina State	7	394,008	56,287
35	North Carolina	7	392,000	56,000
36	Mississippi State	6	335,695	55,949
37	Texas Tech	6	332,081	55,347
38	Iowa State	6	321,880	53,647
39	Colorado	5	251,777	50,355
40	East Carolina	6	300,069	50,012
41	Stanford	7	349,976	49,997
42	Illinois	8	396,380	49,548
43	Kansas State	7	343,209	49,030
44	Arizona	6	293,716	48,953
45	Miami Hurricanes	7	340,576	48,654
46	Louisville	6	291,225	48,538
47	Georgia Tech	7	337,622	48,232
48	Virginia	7	335,582	47,940
49	Minnesota	7	333,996	47,714
50	Pittsburgh	8	368,022	46,003
51	Purdue	7	316,574	45,225
52	Utah	6	270,894	45,149
53	South Florida	7	311,848	44,550
54	Rutgers	7	306,327	43,761
55	Oregon State	6	254,521	42,420
56	Maryland	7	296,484	42,355
57	Kansas	6	253,698	42,283
58	Indiana	6	248,282	41,380
59	Baylor	7	289,574	41,368
60	Syracuse	7	283,528	40,504
61	San Diego State	7	279,056	39,865
62	California	5	188,285	37,657
63	Connecticut	7	256,676	36,668
64	Boston College	6	214,255	35,709
65	Air Force	7	247,122	35,303
66	Navy	5	173,056	34,611
67	UCF	6	205,695	34,283
68	Boise State	6	204,110	34,018
69	TCU	6	202,115	33,686
70	Northwestern	6	200,649	33,442
71	Army	4	133,278	33,320
72	Vanderbilt	7	230,112	32,873
73	Cincinnati	6	193,757	32,293
74	Wake Forest	7	223,769	31,967
75	Hawaii	7	222,493	31,785
76	Houston	7	222,114	31,731
77	Fresno State	6	175,787	29,298
78	Louisiana-Lafayette	5	145,854	29,171
79	Washington State	6	172,746	28,791
80	Southern Miss	6	170,402	28,400
81	Temple	7	196,420	28,060
82	UTEP	6	158,986	26,498
83	Marshall	5	129,371	25,874
84	Duke	7	170,748	24,393
85	Tulsa	6	135,245	22,541
86	Wyoming	6	132,974	22,162
87	Toledo	6	132,941	22,157
88	Colorado State	6	131,202	21,867
89	Louisiana Tech	5	107,592	21,518
90	Arkansas State	6	127,541	21,257
91	UNLV	5	105,995	21,199
92	SMU	6	125,364	20,894
93	Memphis	6	120,470	20,078
94	New Mexico	6	120,160	20,027
95	Western Michigan	5	99,926	19,985
96	Ohio	6	119,345	19,891
97	Tulane	6	118,357	19,726
98	Northern Illinois	7	132,323	18,903
99	North Texas	6	113,186	18,864
100	FIU	6	110,465	18,411
101	Middle Tennessee	6	110,440	18,407
102	San Jose State	5	91,072	18,214
103	Buffalo	6	108,118	18,020
104	Troy	5	89,492	17,898
105	FAU	5	87,824	17,565
106	Utah State	6	104,813	17,469
107	Rice	5	86,643	17,329
108	Western Kentucky	7	116,461	16,637
109	UAB	5	82,893	16,579
110	Miami RedHawks	6	97,043	16,174
111	Nevada	6	94,653	15,776
112	Akron	6	94,405	15,734
113	Louisiana-Monroe	5	77,561	15,512
114	Central Michigan	5	76,456	15,291
115	New Mexico State	6	90,830	15,138
116	Ball State	6	90,383	15,064
117	Bowling Green	6	90,039	15,007
118	Idaho	6	71,877	11,980
119	Kent State	6	69,520	11,587
120	Eastern Michigan	6	25,599	4,267
