= Home Depot Coach of the Year =

American college football award

Coach of the Year
- Awarded for: College football's top head coach
- Country: United States
- Presented by: ESPN and ABC college football analysts

History
- First award: 1994
- Most recent: Curt Cignetti, Indiana

The Coach of the Year award is given annually to college football's top head coach. The award for the Division I Football Bowl Subdivision is selected by ESPN and ABC college football analysts. Brian Kelly and Curt Cignetti are the only coaches to have been awarded multiple times.

== Winners ==
Year	Winner	School	Ref.
1994	Rich Brooks	Oregon	
1995	Gary Barnett	Northwestern	
1996	Bobby Bowden	Florida State	
1997	Mike Price	Washington State	
1998	Phillip Fulmer	Tennessee	
1999	Frank Solich	Nebraska	
2000	Bob Stoops	Oklahoma	
2001	Ralph Friedgen	Maryland	
2002	Tyrone Willingham	Notre Dame	
2003	Pete Carroll	USC	
2004	Urban Meyer	Utah	
2005	Joe Paterno	Penn State	
2006	Greg Schiano	Rutgers	
2007	Mark Mangino	Kansas	
2008	Nick Saban	Alabama	
2009	Brian Kelly	Cincinnati	
2010	Gene Chizik	Auburn	
2011	Les Miles	LSU	
2012	Brian Kelly (2)	Notre Dame (2)	
2013	Gus Malzahn	Auburn (2)	
2014	Gary Patterson	TCU	
2015	Dabo Swinney	Clemson	
2016	Mike MacIntyre	Colorado	
2017	Scott Frost	UCF	
2018	Brian Kelly (3)	Notre Dame (3)	
2019	Ed Orgeron	LSU (2)	
2020	Jamey Chadwell	Coastal Carolina	
2021	Luke Fickell	Cincinnati (2)	
2022	Sonny Dykes	TCU (2)	
2023	Kalen DeBoer	Washington	
2024	Curt Cignetti	Indiana	
2025	Curt Cignetti (2)	Indiana (2)	
