= Bobby Bowden National Collegiate Coach of the Year Award =

US football award

- Awarded for: College football's top head coach who has excelled on the football field while demonstrating perseverance, attitude, integrity, and determination
- Country: United States
- Presented by: Over the Mountain Touchdown club of Birmingham, Alabama; Alabama Sports Foundation

History
- First award: 2009
- Most recent: Gus Malzahn
- Website: www.otmtouchdown.com/bowden-award.php

The Bobby Bowden National Collegiate Coach of the Year Award was a college football award given annually to the nation's best head coach. Established in 2009, Nick Saban was the award's first recipient. The trophy commemorates former Florida State Seminoles football coach Bobby Bowden.

== Overview ==
The Bobby Bowden National Collegiate Coach of the Year Award (the Bowden Award) was presented by the Over the Mountain Touchdown Club of Birmingham, Alabama and the Alabama Sports Foundation. The Bowden Award commemorates Bobby Bowden in recognition of his legendary coaching career and as a national symbol of recognition for the college football coach who has excelled on the football field while demonstrating perseverance, attitude, integrity, and determination; attributes that Bowden has exemplified throughout his coaching career and life. The recipient was determined by voting members of the National Sportscasters and Sportswriters Association. The Bobby Bowden Lifetime Achievement Award was added as a companion award in 2011 with Coach Bowden being its very first recipient. The Awards were presented in March following National Signing Day and prior to the commencement of spring training. The Over the Mountain Touchdown Club and the award have been dormant since 2014.

== Coach of the Year recipients ==
Nick Saban was the inaugural winner of the Bowden Award. Saban led the University of Alabama football team to the 2009 BCS National Championship and AP National Championship, making him the only coach to win a national championship with two different schools since 1950 and one of two coaches to win a Southeastern Conference football championship at two different schools. Bowden presented the Bowden Award to Saban at a public ceremony on March 21, 2010, at the Cahaba Grand Conference Center in Birmingham, Alabama.

Season	Name	School
2009	Nick Saban	Alabama
2010	Gene Chizik	Auburn
2011	Nick Saban	Alabama
2012	Nick Saban	Alabama
2013	Gus Malzahn	Auburn

== Lifetime Achievement Award recipients ==
Year	Recipient
2011	Bobby Bowden
2012	Lee Corso
2013	Brent Musburger
2014	Vince Dooley
