= 2011 SMU Mustangs football team =

American college football season

2011 SMU Mustangs football

BBVA Compass Bowl champion

BBVA Compass Bowl, W 28–6 vs. Pittsburgh
- Conference: Conference USA
- West
- Record: 8–5 (5–3 C-USA)
- Head coach: June Jones (4th season)
- Offensive scheme: Run and shoot
- Defensive coordinator: Tom Mason (4th season)
- Base defense: 3–4
- Home stadium: Gerald J. Ford Stadium

2011 Conference USA football standings
	Conf.			Overall
Team	W		L	W		L
East Division
No. 20 Southern Miss x$	6	–	2	12	–	2
Marshall	5	–	3	7	–	6
East Carolina	4	–	4	5	–	7
UAB	3	–	5	3	–	9
UCF	3	–	5	5	–	7
Memphis	1	–	7	2	–	10
West Division
No. 18 Houston x	8	–	0	13	–	1
Tulsa	7	–	1	8	–	5
SMU	5	–	3	8	–	5
Rice	3	–	5	4	–	8
UTEP	2	–	6	5	–	7
Tulane	1	–	7	2	–	11
Championship: Southern Miss 49, Houston 28
$ – Conference champion; x – Division champion/co-champions; As of January 10, 2012; Rankings from AP Poll

The 2011 SMU Mustangs football team represented Southern Methodist University in the 2011 NCAA Division I FBS football season. The Mustangs were led by fourth year head coach June Jones and played their home games at Gerald J. Ford Stadium. They are a member of the West Division of Conference USA. They finished the season 8–5, 5–3 in C-USA to finish in third place in the West Division. They were invited to the BBVA Compass Bowl where they defeated Pittsburgh 28–6.

== Schedule ==
Date	Time	Opponent	Site	TV	Result	Attendance
September 4	6:30 p.m.	at No. 8 Texas A&M*	Kyle Field; College Station, TX	FSN	L 14–46	86,951
September 10	6:00 p.m.	UTEP	Gerald J. Ford Stadium; University Park, TX	FSN	W 28–17	26,691
September 17	7:00 p.m.	Northwestern State*	Gerald J. Ford Stadium; University Park, TX		W 40–7	20,083
September 24	11:00 a.m.	at Memphis	Liberty Bowl Memorial Stadium; Memphis, TN	FSN	W 42–0	16,748
October 1	2:30 p.m.	at No. 20 TCU*	Amon G. Carter Stadium; Fort Worth, TX (Battle for the Iron Skillet)	CBSSN	W 40–33 ^{OT}	35,632
October 15	2:30 p.m.	UCF	Gerald J. Ford Stadium; University Park, TX	FSN	W 38–17	22,932
October 22	7:00 p.m.	at Southern Miss	M. M. Roberts Stadium; Hattiesburg, MS	CBSSN	L 3–27	32,685
October 29	2:30 p.m.	at Tulsa	Chapman Stadium; Tulsa, OK	FSN	L 7–38	21,261
November 5	2:00 p.m.	Tulane^{†}	Gerald J. Ford Stadium; University Park, TX		W 45–24	20,106
November 12	2:30 p.m.	Navy*	Gerald J. Ford Stadium; University Park, TX (Gansz Trophy)	FSN	L 17–24	21,080
November 19	2:30 p.m.	at No. 11 Houston	Robertson Stadium; Houston, TX (College GameDay / rivalry)	FSN	L 7–37	32,207
November 26	11:00 a.m.	Rice	Gerald J. Ford Stadium; University Park, TX (Battle for the Mayor's Cup)	FSN	W 27–24	23,326
January 7	12:00 p.m.	Pittsburgh*	Legion Field; Birmingham, AL (BBVA Compass Bowl)	ESPN	W 28–6	29,726
*Non-conference game; ^{†}Homecoming; Rankings from AP Poll released prior to the game; All times are in Central time

== Awards and award watch lists ==
- Kyle Padron was named to the Davey O'Brien Award and Manning Award watch lists.
- Kelvin Beachum, Ja’Gared Davis, Taylor Reed and Taylor Thompson were named to the watch list for the Lombardi Award.
- Beachum was named to the Outland Trophy watch list, Thompson made the Nagurski Award List, Cole Beasley and Darius Johnson were named to the Biletnikoff Award watch list.
- Zach Line was named to the watch list for the Maxwell and Doak Walker Award, Thompson And Margus Hunt were selected to the Pony Express Award watch list
- Blake McJunkin was named to the Rimington Trophy watch list.

== Game summaries ==
=== Texas A&M ===
	1	2	3	4	Total
SMU	7	7	0	0	14
#8 Texas A&M	20	13	10	3	46

This game was the 78th meeting of the SMU Mustangs and the Texas A&M Aggies. The previous match-up was September 17, 2005, a game in which Texas A&M defeated SMU with a final score of 66–8. After the Mustangs lost in College Station, Texas A&M now leads the series 42–29–7.

=== UTEP ===
	1	2	3	4	Total
UTEP	10	0	7	0	17
SMU	14	7	0	7	28

This game was the 19th meeting of the SMU Mustangs and the UTEP Miners. They last met in the previous season on November 6, 2010, when UTEP defeated SMU with a final score of 28–14. After winning 28–17, SMU leads the series 11–8. Ja'Gared Davis was named Conference USA Defensive Player of the Week for his 4th quarter fumble recovery in the end zone for a touchdown.

=== Northwestern State ===
	1	2	3	4	Total
Northwestern State	0	0	0	7	7
SMU	13	13	7	7	40

This game was the 1st meeting of the SMU Mustangs and the Northwestern State Demons. After winning 40–7, SMU leads the series 1–0.

=== Memphis ===
	1	2	3	4	Total
SMU	14	14	0	14	42
Memphis	0	0	0	0	0

This game was the 4th meeting of the SMU Mustangs and the Memphis Tigers. They last met on November 8, 2008, when Memphis defeated SMU with a final score of 31–26. The Mustangs' 42–0 victory in the Liberty Bowl Memorial Stadium marks the first time SMU has defeated Memphis and Memphis now leads the series 3–1.

=== TCU ===
	1	2	3	4	OT	Total
SMU	14	3	10	6	7	40
#20 TCU	0	10	0	23	0	33

This game marked the 91st edition of the Battle for the Iron Skillet. The two teams last met on September 24, 2010, when TCU defeated SMU 41–24. After the Mustangs' overtime victory in Fort Worth, SMU now trails the series 40–43–7. This marked SMU's second victory over a ranked team since receiving the NCAA Death Penalty for the 1987–8 seasons. After this game, SMU received 5 points in the AP Poll and 10 points in the Coaches Poll. SMU became the first team to beat TCU in Fort Worth since the 2007 season. Wide receiver Darius Johnson was named Conference USA Offensive Player of the Week for his two receiving touchdowns, 12 catches, and 152 yards in the game. This game was the last away win for SMU in the 2011 season.

This would be the Mustangs' last win over the Horned Frogs until 2019.

=== UCF ===
	1	2	3	4	Total
UCF	0	3	0	14	17
SMU	10	7	7	14	38

This game was the 4th meeting of the SMU Mustangs and UCF Knights. The two teams last met on December 4, 2010, during the 2010 Conference USA Football Championship Game when UCF defeated SMU 17–7. The Mustangs' 38–17 victory marks the first time SMU has defeated UCF and UCF now leads the series 3–1. For his third straight 300-yard game, QB J.J. McDermott was named Conference USA Offensive Player of the Week. PR Richard Crawford was named Conference USA Special Teams Player of the Week for his 92-yard punt return for a touchdown which ties the all-time SMU record.

=== Southern Miss ===
	1	2	3	4	Total
SMU	0	3	0	0	3
Southern Miss	10	0	3	14	27

This game was the 3rd meeting of the SMU Mustangs and Southern Miss Golden Eagles. The two teams last met on November 29, 2008, when Southern Miss defeated SMU 28–12. Southern Miss' 27–3 victory propelled them into the top 25 and extends their lead in the overall head-to-head record to an undefeated 3–0.

=== Tulsa ===
	1	2	3	4	Total
SMU	0	0	7	0	7
Tulsa	10	14	14	0	38

This game marked the 19th meeting of the SMU Mustangs and the Tulsa Golden Hurricane. They last met in the previous season on October 9, 2010, where SMU defeated Tulsa with a final score of 21–18. Following Tulsa's 38–7 victory this season, SMU now leads the series 12–7.

=== Tulane ===
	1	2	3	4	Total
Tulane	0	0	24	0	24
SMU	14	17	7	7	45

This game marked the 20th meeting of the SMU Mustangs and the Tulane Green Wave. They last met in the previous season on October 30, 2011, where SMU defeated Tulane with a final score of 31–17. Following SMU's 45–24 victory, Tulane now lead the series 12–8. This victory made SMU bowl eligible.

=== Navy ===
	1	2	3	4	Total
Navy	3	7	7	7	24
SMU	0	3	7	7	17

This game marked the 16th meeting of the SMU Mustangs and the Navy Midshipmen. The two teams have a heated rivalry in which they compete for the Gansz Trophy. They last met in the previous season on October 16, 2010, where Navy defeated SMU with a final score of 28–21. Following Navy's 24–17 victory, the Midshipmen now lead the series 9–7. This loss marked SMU's only loss in Ford Stadium in the 2011 season as well as SMU's only loss to a team with an overall losing record.

=== Houston ===
	1	2	3	4	Total
SMU	0	0	0	7	7
#11 Houston	3	10	10	14	37

This game marked the 26th meeting of the SMU Mustangs and the Houston Cougars. They last met in the previous season on October 23, 2010, where Houston defeated SMU with a final score of 45–20. Following Houston's 37–7 victory, Houston now leads the series 17–9–1.

=== Rice ===
	1	2	3	4	Total
Rice	0	7	10	7	24
SMU	7	7	0	13	27

This game marked the 89th meeting of the SMU Mustangs and Rice Owls in the Battle for the Mayor's Cup. They last met in the previous season on October 2, 2010, where SMU defeated Rice with a final score of 42–31. Following SMU's 27–24 victory, SMU now leads the series 48–40–1.

=== Pittsburgh (BBVA Compass Bowl) ===
	1	2	3	4	Total
SMU	21	0	7	0	28
Pittsburgh	0	3	3	0	6

This game marked the 6th meeting of the SMU Mustangs and the Pittsburgh Panthers. They last met on January 1, 1983, in the Cotton Bowl Classic, where SMU defeated Pittsburgh 7–3. After SMU won the 2012 BBVA Compass Bowl, the series now stands in the Mustangs' favor 3–2–1

== Roster ==
2011 SMU Mustangs football team roster
Players
Coaches
Offense

Pos.	#	Name	Class
QB	2	Kyle Padron	Jr
WR	11	Cole Beasley	Sr
RB	48	Zach Line	Jr
OT	70	Kelvin Beachum	Sr
G	77	Josh LeRibeus	Sr

Defense

Pos.	#	Name	Class
LB	3	Kevin Pope	Fr
DB	4	Jeremy Gray	So
LB	56	Ja'Gared Davis	So
DB	23	Chris Banjo	Sr

Special teams

Pos.	#	Name	Class

Head coach

- June Jones

Coordinators/assistant coaches

Legend

- (C) Team captain
- (S) Suspended
- (I) Ineligible
- Injured
- Redshirt

Roster
