= 2011 Navy Midshipmen football team =

American college football season

2011 Navy Midshipmen football
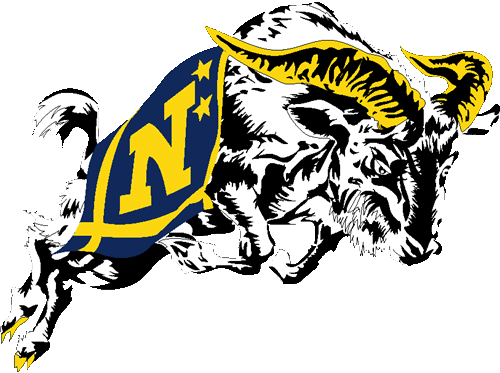
- Conference: Independent
- Record: 5–7
- Head coach: Ken Niumatalolo (4th season)
- Offensive coordinator: Ivin Jasper (4th season)
- Offensive scheme: Triple option
- Defensive coordinator: Buddy Green (10th season)
- Base defense: Multiple
- MVP: Jabaree Tuani
- Captains: Alexander Teich; Jabaree Tuani
- Home stadium: Navy–Marine Corps Memorial Stadium

2011 NCAA Division I FBS independents football records
| | Conf. | | | Overall |
| Team | W | | L | W | | L |
|---|---|---|---|---|---|---|
| BYU | | – | | 10 | – | 3 |
| Notre Dame | | – | | 8 | – | 5 |
| Navy | | – | | 5 | – | 7 |
| Army | | – | | 3 | – | 9 |
Rankings from AP Poll

The 2011 Navy Midshipmen football team represented the United States Naval Academy as an independent in the 2011 NCAA Division I FBS football season. The Midshipmen were led by fourth-year head coach Ken Niumatalolo and played their home games at Navy–Marine Corps Memorial Stadium. They finished the season 5–7.

== Schedule ==
| Date | Time | Opponent | Site | TV | Result | Attendance | Source |
|---|---|---|---|---|---|---|---|
| September 3 | 3:30 p.m. | No. 5 (FCS) Delaware | Navy–Marine Corps Memorial Stadium; Annapolis, MD | CBSSN | W 40–17 | 34,117 | |
| September 10 | 7:00 p.m. | at Western Kentucky | Houchens Industries–L. T. Smith Stadium; Bowling Green, KY | ESPN3 | W 40–14 | 19,409 | |
| September 17 | 6:00 p.m. | at No. 10 South Carolina | Williams–Brice Stadium; Columbia, SC | ESPN2 | L 21–24 | 78,807 | |
| October 1 | 12:00 p.m. | Air Force | Navy–Marine Corps Memorial Stadium; Annapolis, MD (Commander-in-Chief's Trophy) | CBS | L 34–35 ^{OT} | 37,506 | |
| October 8 | 3:30 p.m. | Southern Mississippi | Navy–Marine Corps Memorial Stadium; Annapolis, MD | CBSSN | L 35–63 | 33,462 | |
| October 15 | 2:00 p.m. | at Rutgers | High Point Solutions Stadium; Piscataway, NJ | ESPN3 | L 20–21 | 47,138 | |
| October 22 | 3:30 p.m. | East Carolina^{†} | Navy–Marine Corps Memorial Stadium; Annapolis, MD | CBSSN | L 35–38 | 34,612 | |
| October 29 | 3:30 p.m. | at Notre Dame | Notre Dame Stadium; Notre Dame, IN (rivalry) | NBC | L 14–56 | 80,795 | |
| November 5 | 3:30 p.m. | Troy | Navy–Marine Corps Memorial Stadium; Annapolis, MD | CBSSN | W 42–14 | 33,359 | |
| November 12 | 3:30 p.m. | at SMU | Gerald J. Ford Stadium; University Park, TX (Gansz Trophy) | FSN | W 24–17 | 21,080 | |
| November 19 | 4:00 p.m. | at San Jose State | Spartan Stadium; San Jose, CA | ESPN3 | L 24–27 | 25,114 | |
| December 10 | 2:30 p.m. | vs. Army | FedExField; Landover, MD (Army–Navy Game) | CBS | W 27–21 | 80,789 | |
^{†}Homecoming; Rankings from AP Poll released prior to the game; All times are in Eastern time

== Game summaries ==
=== Delaware ===
Delaware at Navy

| Team | 1 | 2 | 3 | 4 | Total |
|---|---|---|---|---|---|
| Delaware | 0 | 7 | 3 | 7 | 17 |
| • Navy | 13 | 6 | 7 | 14 | 40 |

- Date: September 3
- Location: Navy–Marine Corps Memorial Stadium, Annapolis, Maryland
- Game start: 3:30 p.m.
- Elapsed time: 3:18
- Game attendance: 34,117
- Game weather: Fair, 79 F, wind 12 SE
- Referee: Jeff Heaser
- Television network: CBSSN

=== Army ===
Army vs. Navy

| Team | 1 | 2 | 3 | 4 | Total |
|---|---|---|---|---|---|
| Army | 0 | 14 | 7 | 0 | 21 |
| • Navy | 7 | 7 | 7 | 6 | 27 |

- Date: December 10
- Location: FedExField, Landover, Maryland
- Game start: 2:30 p.m.
- Elapsed time: 3:16
- Game attendance: 80,789
- Game weather: Sunny, 46 F, wind 9-19 NW
- Referee: Jeff Flanagan
- Television network: CBS

Scoring summary
| 1 | 1:06 | NAVY | Kriss Proctor 4-yard run (Jon Teague kick) | NAVY 7-0 |
| 2 | 7:05 | NAVY | Alexander Teich 10-yard run (Jon Teague kick) | NAVY 14-0 |
| 2 | 3:34 | ARMY | Trent Steelman 34-yard run (Alex Carlton kick) | NAVY 14-7 |
| 2 | 0:49 | ARMY | Malcolm Brown 5-yard run (Alex Carlton kick) | Tied 14-14 |
| 3 | 12:43 | NAVY | Kriss Proctor 2-yard run (Jon Teague kick) | NAVY 21-14 |
| 3 | 9:45 | ARMY | Malcolm Brown 25-yard pass from Trent Steelman (Alex Carlton kick) | Tied 21-21 |
| 4 | 12:03 | NAVY | Jon Teague 23-yard field goal | NAVY 24-21 |
| 4 | 10:26 | NAVY | Jon Teague 44-yard field goal | NAVY 27-21 |

== Roster ==
- Kriss Proctor
- PK Jon Teague
