= 2011 UTEP Miners football team =

American college football season

2011 UTEP Miners football
- Conference: Conference USA
- West Division
- Record: 5–7 (2–6 C-USA)
- Head coach: Mike Price (8th season)
- Offensive coordinator: Bob Connelly (4th season)
- Offensive scheme: Spread
- Defensive coordinator: Andre Patterson (2nd season)
- Base defense: 3–4
- Home stadium: Sun Bowl

2011 Conference USA football standings
	Conf.			Overall
Team	W		L	W		L
East Division
No. 20 Southern Miss x$	6	–	2	12	–	2
Marshall	5	–	3	7	–	6
East Carolina	4	–	4	5	–	7
UAB	3	–	5	3	–	9
UCF	3	–	5	5	–	7
Memphis	1	–	7	2	–	10
West Division
No. 18 Houston x	8	–	0	13	–	1
Tulsa	7	–	1	8	–	5
SMU	5	–	3	8	–	5
Rice	3	–	5	4	–	8
UTEP	2	–	6	5	–	7
Tulane	1	–	7	2	–	11
Championship: Southern Miss 49, Houston 28
$ – Conference champion; x – Division champion/co-champions; As of January 10, 2012; Rankings from AP Poll

The 2011 UTEP Miners football team represented the University of Texas at El Paso (UTEP) as a member of the West Division in Conference USA (C-USA) during the 2011 NCAA Division I FCS football season. Led by eighth-year head coach Mike Price, the Miners compiled an overall record of 5–7 with a mark of 2–6 in conference play, placing fifth in the C-USA's West Division. The team played home games at the Sun Bowl in El Paso, Texas.

UTEP averaged 26,498 fans per game.

== Schedule ==
Date	Time	Opponent	Site	TV	Result	Attendance	Source
September 3	7:00 pm	Stony Brook*	Sun Bowl; El Paso, TX	TWCEP	W 31–24 ^{OT}	28,752	
September 10	5:00 pm	at SMU	Gerald J. Ford Stadium; Dallas, TX	FSN	L 17–28	26,691	
September 17	6:00 pm	at New Mexico State*	Aggie Memorial Stadium; Las Cruces, NM (Battle of I-10)	ALT	W 16–10	19,751	
September 24	5:00 pm	at No. 17 South Florida*	Raymond James Stadium; Tampa, FL	ESPN3	L 24–52	48,231	
September 29	6:00 pm	Houston	Sun Bowl; El Paso, TX	CBSSN	L 42–49	24,111	
October 15	1:30 pm	at Tulane	Louisiana Superdome; New Orleans, LA	FCS	W 44–7	16,690	
October 22	6:00 pm	Colorado State*^{†}	Sun Bowl; El Paso, TX	TWCEP	W 31–17	31,797	
October 29	6:00 pm	No. 25 Southern Miss	Sun Bowl; El Paso, TX	CBSSN	L 13–31	24,906	
November 5	1:30 pm	at Rice	Rice Stadium; Houston, TX	FSN	L 37–41	14,372	
November 12	6:00 pm	East Carolina	Sun Bowl Stadium; El Paso, TX	TWCEP	W 22–17	25,571	
November 19	1:00 pm	Tulsa	Sun Bowl; El Paso, TX	CBSSN	L 28–57	26,494	
November 26	5:00 pm	at UCF	Bright House Networks Stadium; Orlando, FL	CBSSN	L 14–31	42,033	
*Non-conference game; ^{†}Homecoming; Rankings from AP Poll released prior to the game; All times are in Mountain time
