= 2011 UAB Blazers football team =

American college football season

2011 UAB Blazers football
- Conference: Conference USA
- East Division
- Record: 3–9 (3–5 C-USA)
- Head coach: Neil Callaway (5th season)
- Offensive coordinator: Kim Helton (5th season)
- Offensive scheme: Pro spread
- Defensive coordinator: Tommy West (1st season)
- Base defense: 4–3
- Home stadium: Legion Field

2011 Conference USA football standings
	Conf.			Overall
Team	W		L	W		L
East Division
No. 20 Southern Miss x$	6	–	2	12	–	2
Marshall	5	–	3	7	–	6
East Carolina	4	–	4	5	–	7
UAB	3	–	5	3	–	9
UCF	3	–	5	5	–	7
Memphis	1	–	7	2	–	10
West Division
No. 18 Houston x	8	–	0	13	–	1
Tulsa	7	–	1	8	–	5
SMU	5	–	3	8	–	5
Rice	3	–	5	4	–	8
UTEP	2	–	6	5	–	7
Tulane	1	–	7	2	–	11
Championship: Southern Miss 49, Houston 28
$ – Conference champion; x – Division champion/co-champions; As of January 10, 2012; Rankings from AP Poll

The 2011 UAB Blazers football team represented the University of Alabama at Birmingham (UAB) as a member of the East Division in Conference USA (C-USA) during the 2011 NCAA Division I FBS football season. Led by Neil Callaway in his fifth and final season as head coach, the Blazers compiled an overall record of 3–9 with a mark of 3–5 in conference play, tying for fourth place in C-USA's East Division. The team played home games at Legion Field in Birmingham, Alabama.

Callaway was fired at the end of the season. He finished his tenure at UAB with a five-year record of 18–42.

== Schedule ==
Date	Time	Opponent	Site	TV	Result	Attendance
September 10	7:00 p.m.	at No. 18 Florida*	Ben Hill Griffin Stadium; Gainesville, FL	FSN	L 0–39	87,473
September 17	3:00 p.m.	Tulane	Legion Field; Birmingham, AL		L 10–49	17,658
September 24	3:30 p.m.	at East Carolina	Dowdy–Ficklen Stadium; Greenville, NC		L 23–28	50,023
October 1	6:00 p.m.	at Troy*	Veterans Memorial Stadium; Troy, AL	SportSouth	L 23–24	18,044
October 8	11:00 a.m.	Mississippi State*	Legion Field; Birmingham, AL	FSN	L 3–21	28,351
October 15	7:00 p.m.	at Tulsa	Skelly Field at H. A. Chapman Stadium; Tulsa, OK	CBSSN	L 20–37	21,494
October 20	7:00 p.m.	UCF	Legion Field; Birmingham, AL	CSS	W 26–24	8,872
October 29	11:00 a.m.	at Marshall	Joan C. Edwards Stadium; Huntington, WV	CSS	L 14–59	20,735
November 5	6:00 p.m.	No. 14 Houston	Legion Field; Birmingham, AL	CBSSN	L 13–56	13,909
November 12	3:15 p.m.	at Memphis	Liberty Bowl Memorial Stadium; Memphis, TN (Battle for the Bones)		W 41–35	17,848
November 17	7:00 p.m.	No. 22 Southern Mississippi	Legion Field; Birmingham, AL	CBSSN	W 34–31	14,103
November 26	6:00 p.m.	at Florida Atlantic*	FAU Stadium; Boca Raton, FL		L 35–38	12,044
*Non-conference game; Rankings from AP Poll released prior to the game; All times are in Central time
