= 2011 Marshall Thundering Herd football team =

American college football season

2011 Marshall Thundering Herd football

Beef 'O' Brady's Bowl champion

Beef 'O' Brady's Bowl, W 20–10 vs. FIU
- Conference: Conference USA
- East
- Record: 7–6 (5–3 C-USA)
- Head coach: Doc Holliday (2nd season)
- Offensive coordinator: Bill Legg (2nd season)
- Co-offensive coordinator: Tony Petersen (2nd season)
- Offensive scheme: Spread
- Defensive coordinator: Chris Rippon (2nd season)
- Base defense: 3–4
- Home stadium: Joan C. Edwards Stadium

2011 Conference USA football standings
	Conf.			Overall
Team	W		L	W		L
East Division
No. 20 Southern Miss x$	6	–	2	12	–	2
Marshall	5	–	3	7	–	6
East Carolina	4	–	4	5	–	7
UAB	3	–	5	3	–	9
UCF	3	–	5	5	–	7
Memphis	1	–	7	2	–	10
West Division
No. 18 Houston x	8	–	0	13	–	1
Tulsa	7	–	1	8	–	5
SMU	5	–	3	8	–	5
Rice	3	–	5	4	–	8
UTEP	2	–	6	5	–	7
Tulane	1	–	7	2	–	11
Championship: Southern Miss 49, Houston 28
$ – Conference champion; x – Division champion/co-champions; As of January 10, 2012; Rankings from AP Poll

The 2011 Marshall Thundering Herd football team represented Marshall University in the 2011 NCAA Division I FBS football season. The Thundering Herd were led by second-year head coach Doc Holliday and played their home games at Joan C. Edwards Stadium. They are a member of the East Division of Conference USA. They finished the season 7–6, 5–3 in C-USA to finish in second place in the East Division. They were invited to the Beef 'O' Brady's Bowl where they defeated FIU 20–10.

== Previous season ==
In the 2010 season under first year head coach Doc Holliday, the Thundering Herd finished with an overall record of 5–7 and 4–4 within Conference USA. After starting the season 1–6, Marshall won four of the last five games. They missed playing in a bowl game for the first time since 2008.

== Schedule ==
Date	Time	Opponent	Site	TV	Result	Attendance
September 4	3:30 pm	at No. 24 West Virginia*	Mountaineer Field; Morgantown, WV (Friends of Coal Bowl)	ESPN	L 13–34	60,758
September 10	3:30 pm	Southern Miss	Joan C. Edwards Stadium; Huntington, WV	CSS	W 26–20	24,247
September 17	7:00 pm	at Ohio*	Peden Stadium; Athens, OH (Battle for the Bell)	ESPN3	L 7–44	24,244
September 24	3:30 pm	No. 13 Virginia Tech*	Joan C. Edwards Stadium; Huntington, WV	CBSSN	L 10–30	34,424
October 1	3:30 pm	at Louisville*	Papa John's Cardinal Stadium; Louisville, KY	WOWK	W 17–13	53,267
October 8	7:00 pm	at UCF	Bright House Networks Stadium; Orlando, FL	BHSN	L 6–16	24,750
October 15	3:00 pm	Rice^{†}	Joan C. Edwards Stadium; Huntington, WV		W 24–20	27,509
October 22	4:30 pm	at No. 21 Houston	Robertson Stadium; Houston, TX	CSS	L 28–63	32,107
October 29	12:00 pm	UAB	Joan C. Edwards Stadium; Huntington, WV	CSS	W 59–14	20,735
November 12	12:00 pm	at Tulsa	Chapman Stadium; Tulsa, OK	FSN	L 17–59	17,672
November 17	8:00 pm	at Memphis	Liberty Bowl Memorial Stadium; Memphis, TN	FSN	W 23–22	15,101
November 26	3:30 pm	East Carolina	Joan C. Edwards Stadium; Huntington, WV (rivalry)	CBSSN	W 34–27 ^{OT}	22,456
December 20	8:00 pm	vs. FIU*	Tropicana Field; St. Petersburg, FL (Beef 'O' Brady's Bowl)	ESPN	W 20–10	20,072
*Non-conference game; ^{†}Homecoming; Rankings from AP Poll released prior to game; All times are in Eastern time

== Game summaries ==
=== West Virginia ===
	1	2	3	4	Total
Thundering Herd	7	3	3	0	13
#24 Mountaineers	3	17	7	7	34

The Herd again fell to The Mountaineers in a game that was delayed a total of 4 hours, 22 minutes and called with 14:36 left in the 4th quarter. Following 3rd a quarter Tavon Austin kickoff return for a TD that gave the Mountaineers a 27–13 lead with 5 minutes to play in the 3rd quarter the game experienced a lightning delay that lasted 3 hours, 6 minutes. Once resuming play a Vernard Roberts 1 Yd Run extended the WVU lead to 34–13 early in the 4th quarter, after which the game was once again delayed for lightning. It was ultimately agreed to by both teams to end the game.

=== Southern Miss ===
	1	2	3	4	Total
Golden Eagles	7	10	0	3	20
Thundering Herd	3	7	14	2	26

=== Ohio ===
	1	2	3	4	Total
Thundering Herd	7	0	0	0	7
Bobcats	10	24	3	7	44

=== Virginia Tech ===
	1	2	3	4	Total
#13 Hokies	13	10	0	7	30
Thundering Herd	0	10	0	0	10

=== Louisville ===
	1	2	3	4	Total
Thundering Herd	7	0	3	7	17
Cardinals	0	13	0	0	13

=== Central Florida ===
	1	2	3	4	Total
Thundering Herd	0	0	6	0	6
Knights	14	2	0	0	16

=== Rice ===
	1	2	3	4	Total
Owls	0	6	14	0	20
Thundering Herd	7	10	0	7	24

=== Houston ===
	1	2	3	4	Total
Thundering Herd	7	7	7	7	28
#21 Cougars	14	21	14	14	63

=== UAB ===
	1	2	3	4	Total
Blazers	0	0	7	7	14
Thundering Herd	10	28	14	7	59

=== Tulsa ===
	1	2	3	4	Total
Thundering Herd	3	0	14	0	17
Golden Hurricane	14	28	7	10	59

Marshall and Tulsa last met in 2008 at Huntington in a game won by Tulsa 38–35. Marshall is 0–2 all time against Tulsa.

=== Memphis ===
	1	2	3	4	Total
Thundering Herd	7	3	0	13	23
Tigers	7	6	3	6	22

Marshall and Memphis last met in 2010 at Huntington in a game won by Marshall 28–13. Marshall is 4–2 all time against Memphis. This year's game will be played on a Thursday.

=== East Carolina ===
	1	2	3	4	OT	Total
Pirates	14	6	0	7	0	27
Thundering Herd	10	7	3	7	7	34

Marshall and East Carolina last met in 2010 at Greenville in a game won by East Carolina 37–10. Marshall is 3–9 all time against ECU. Because both teams are 5–6, the winner of the matchup will receive bowl eligibility, while the loser will not.

=== FIU (Beef 'O' Brady's Bowl) ===
	1	2	3	4	Total
FIU	7	3	0	0	10
Marshall	3	7	0	10	20

Marshall has a 6–2 record in bowl games, with the last one at the 2009 Little Caesars Pizza Bowl defeating Ohio, 21–17. Defensively, Marshall is tied for fifth nationally in tackles for loss (95), and is tied for 15th in fumbles recovered (14). Nationally, Vinny Curry is tied for third with six forced fumbles and is also second on in tackles for loss (21) and is sixth in sacks (11.0). George Carpenter has three fumble recoveries which places him tie for 12th place.
