= 2011 Memphis Tigers football team =

American college football season

2011 Memphis Tigers football
- Conference: Conference USA
- East
- Record: 2–10 (1–7 C-USA)
- Head coach: Larry Porter (2nd season)
- Offensive coordinator: Eric Price (2nd season)
- Offensive scheme: Multiple
- Defensive coordinator: Jay Hopson (2nd season)
- Base defense: Multiple
- Home stadium: Liberty Bowl Memorial Stadium

2011 Conference USA football standings
	Conf.			Overall
Team	W		L	W		L
East Division
No. 20 Southern Miss x$	6	–	2	12	–	2
Marshall	5	–	3	7	–	6
East Carolina	4	–	4	5	–	7
UAB	3	–	5	3	–	9
UCF	3	–	5	5	–	7
Memphis	1	–	7	2	–	10
West Division
No. 18 Houston x	8	–	0	13	–	1
Tulsa	7	–	1	8	–	5
SMU	5	–	3	8	–	5
Rice	3	–	5	4	–	8
UTEP	2	–	6	5	–	7
Tulane	1	–	7	2	–	11
Championship: Southern Miss 49, Houston 28
$ – Conference champion; x – Division champion/co-champions; As of January 10, 2012; Rankings from AP Poll

The 2011 Memphis Tigers football team represented the University of Memphis in the 2011 NCAA Division I FBS football season. The Tigers were led by second year head coach Larry Porter and played their home games at the Liberty Bowl Memorial Stadium. They are a member of the East Division of Conference USA. They finished the season 2–10, 1–7 in C-USA play to finish in last place in the East Division

Head coach Larry Porter was fired at the end of the season after going 3–21 in two seasons.

== Schedule ==
Date	Time	Opponent	Site	TV	Result	Attendance
September 1	7:00 p.m.	No. 20 Mississippi State*	Liberty Bowl Memorial Stadium; Memphis, TN	FSN	L 14–59	33,990
September 10	6:00 p.m.	at Arkansas State*	ASU Stadium; Jonesboro, AR (Paint Bucket Bowl)	ESPN3	L 3–47	29,872
September 17	6:00 p.m.	Austin Peay*	Liberty Bowl Memorial Stadium; Memphis, TN		W 27–6	18,808
September 24	11:00 a.m.	SMU	Liberty Bowl Memorial Stadium; Memphis, TN	FSN	L 0–42	16,748
October 1	6:00 p.m.	at Middle Tennessee*	Johnny "Red" Floyd Stadium; Murfreesboro, TN	ESPN3	L 31–38	20,098
October 8	11:30 a.m.	at Rice	Rice Stadium; Houston, TX		L 6–28	14,179
October 15	6:00 p.m.	East Carolina	Liberty Bowl Memorial Stadium; Memphis, TN		L 17–35	17,975
October 22	2:30 p.m.	at Tulane	Louisiana Superdome; New Orleans, LA		W 33–17	25,158
October 29	3:00 p.m.	at UCF	Bright House Networks Stadium; Orlando, FL	BHSN	L 0–41	37,683
November 12	3:15 p.m.	UAB	Liberty Bowl Memorial Stadium; Memphis, TN (Battle for the Bones)		L 35–41	17,848
November 17	7:00 p.m.	Marshall	Liberty Bowl Memorial Stadium; Memphis, TN	FSN	L 22–23	15,101
November 26	3:00 p.m.	at Southern Mississippi	M. M. Roberts Stadium; Hattiesburg, MS (Black and Blue Bowl)	CSS	L 7–44	26,347
*Non-conference game; Rankings from Coaches' Poll released prior to the game; All times are in Central time
