= 2011 Tulsa Golden Hurricane football team =

American college football season

2011 Tulsa Golden Hurricane football

Armed Forces Bowl, L 21–24 vs. BYU
- Conference: Conference USA
- West Division
- Record: 8–5 (7–1 C-USA)
- Head coach: Bill Blankenship (1st season)
- Offensive coordinator: Greg Peterson (1st season)
- Defensive coordinator: Brent Guy (1st season)
- Home stadium: Skelly Field at H. A. Chapman Stadium

2011 Conference USA football standings
	Conf.			Overall
Team	W		L	W		L
East Division
No. 20 Southern Miss x$	6	–	2	12	–	2
Marshall	5	–	3	7	–	6
East Carolina	4	–	4	5	–	7
UAB	3	–	5	3	–	9
UCF	3	–	5	5	–	7
Memphis	1	–	7	2	–	10
West Division
No. 18 Houston x	8	–	0	13	–	1
Tulsa	7	–	1	8	–	5
SMU	5	–	3	8	–	5
Rice	3	–	5	4	–	8
UTEP	2	–	6	5	–	7
Tulane	1	–	7	2	–	11
Championship: Southern Miss 49, Houston 28
$ – Conference champion; x – Division champion/co-champions; As of January 10, 2012; Rankings from AP Poll

The 2011 Tulsa Golden Hurricane Wave football team represented the University of Tulsa in the 2011 NCAA Division I FBS football season. The Golden Hurricane were led by first-year head coach Bill Blankenship and played their home games at Skelly Field at H. A. Chapman Stadium. They were a member of the West Division of Conference USA (C-USA). They finished the season 8–5, 7–1 in C-USA play to finish in second place in the West Division. They were invited to the Armed Forces Bowl, where they were defeated by BYU, 21–24.

== Schedule ==
Date	Time	Opponent	Site	TV	Result	Attendance	Source
September 3	7:00 p.m.	at No. 1 Oklahoma*	Gaylord Family Oklahoma Memorial Stadium; Norman, OK	FX	L 14–47	85,260	
September 10	2:30 p.m.	at Tulane	Louisiana Superdome; New Orleans, LA	CST	W 31–3	19,752	
September 18^{A}	12:15 a.m.^{A}	No. 8 Oklahoma State*	Skelly Field at H. A. Chapman Stadium; Tulsa, OK (rivalry)	FSN	L 33–59	24,563	
September 24	7:00 p.m.	at No. 4 Boise State*	Bronco Stadium; Boise, ID	CBSSN	L 21–41	34,019	
October 1	6:00 p.m.	North Texas*	Skelly Field at H. A. Chapman Stadium; Tulsa, OK		W 41–24	21,240	
October 15	7:00 p.m.	UAB	Skelly Field at H. A. Chapman Stadium; Tulsa, OK	CBSSN	W 37–20	21,494	
October 22	6:00 p.m.	at Rice	Rice Stadium; Houston, Texas	FSN	W 38–20	17,314	
October 29	2:30 p.m.	SMU^{†}	Skelly Field at H. A. Chapman Stadium; Tulsa, OK	FSN	W 38–7	21,261	
November 3	7:00 p.m.	at UCF	Bright House Networks Stadium; Orlando, FL	CBSSN	W 24–17	36,712	
November 12	11:00 a.m.	Marshall	Skelly Field at H. A. Chapman Stadium; Tulsa, OK	FSN	W 59–17	17,672	
November 19	2:00 p.m.	at UTEP	Sun Bowl; El Paso, TX	TWCEP	W 57–28	26,494	
November 25	11:00 a.m.	No. 8 Houston	Skelly Field at H. A. Chapman Stadium; Tulsa, OK	FSN	L 16–48	29,015	
December 30	11:00 a.m.	vs. BYU	Gerald J. Ford Stadium; University Park, TX (Armed Forces Bowl)	ESPN	L 21–24	30,258	
*Non-conference game; ^{†}Homecoming; Rankings from AP Poll released prior to the game; All times are in Central time

- ^A Originally scheduled to kick off at 9:00 p.m. on September 17 but was delayed past midnight due to lightning.

== Game summaries ==
=== Oklahoma ===
	1	2	3	4	Total
Golden Hurricane	0	7	0	7	14
No. 1 Sooners	10	20	14	3	47

In Bill Blankenship's first game as head coach, the Golden Hurricane traveled to Norman to take on the preseason No. 1 Oklahoma Sooners. Tulsa managed to accumulate 400 yards of offense but were held to only two touchdowns, ensuring another easy win for Oklahoma. Tulsa's only score of the first half came on a 56-yard pass from G. J. Kinne to Bryan Burnham near the end of the second quarter against a coverage breakdown by the Sooners. Kinne also completed a 24-yard TD pass to Trey Watts in the fourth quarter and finished with 271 passing yards, going 18-of-33 with one interception. Willie Carter was the Golden Hurricane's leading receiver with 5 catches for 135 yards, including catches of 69 and 44 yards. With the loss, Tulsa's all-time record against the Sooners fell to 7–17–1.

=== Tulane ===
	1	2	3	4	Total
Golden Hurricane	3	7	7	14	31
Green Wave	3	0	0	0	3

Tulsa's first conference match-up of the season was against Tulane in the Superdome. The Green Wave got on the board first after Shakiel Smith intercepted a deep pass from G. J. Kinne and returned it for 36 yards, setting up a successful field goal attempt. Tulsa responded with a field goal of its own near the end of the first quarter to tie the game at 3–3. The Golden Hurricane went ahead on a 5-yard touchdown reception by Bryan Burnham in the second quarter and continued to build its lead after halftime, aided by a strong defensive performance. Kinne completed 21 of 29 for 271 yards with three touchdowns and one interception. Alex Singleton was the team's leading rusher with 9 carries for 61 yards and a score, and Burnham caught 7 passes for 94 yards, with two touchdowns. Tulsa improved its record against Tulane to 7–1 overall, with the only loss occurring in 1968.

=== Oklahoma State ===
	1	2	3	4	Total
No. 7 Cowboys	14	17	21	7	59
Golden Hurricane	3	3	20	7	33

In week 3, Tulsa took on Oklahoma State in a home game that memorably lasted until 3:35 a.m. after inclement weather delayed the kickoff past midnight. The Golden Hurricane scored a field goal on their first drive to take an early lead, but were unable to contain the Cowboys' potent offense and quickly fell behind for good. The team was further hindered by the loss of G. J. Kinne near the end of the first quarter, forcing them to rely heavily on the run for the remainder of the game. Backup QB Kalen Henderson completed 6 of 20 for 104 yards in his second appearance for the Golden Hurricane, with two touchdown passes (both to Bryan Burnham) and three interceptions. Ja'Terian Douglas had 173 yards rushing on 12 carries, with two long touchdown runs. Trey Watts added 159 rushing yards from 25 attempts. Tulsa's record against the Cowboys fell to 28–39–5 with the loss.

=== Boise State ===
	1	2	3	4	Total
Golden Hurricane	0	0	7	14	21
No. 4 Broncos	13	14	7	7	41

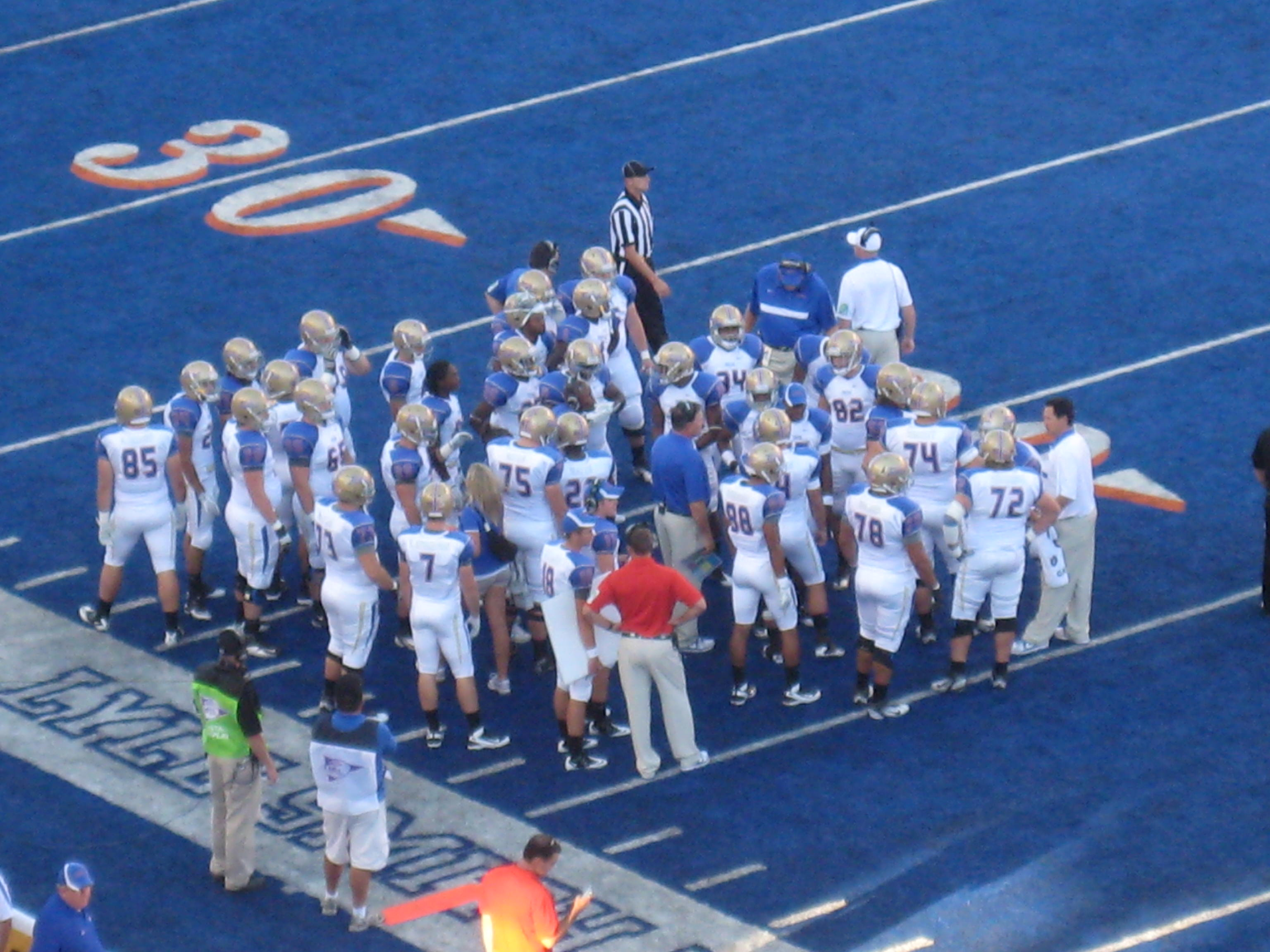
Tulsa on the blue turf.

Tulsa went on the road in week 4 to take on its third top-10 opponent of the season, Boise State. The Broncos continued their dominance in the series, improving their all-time record against the Golden Hurricane to 6–0. G. J. Kinne was intercepted four times and Tulsa did not manage to score until the third quarter, by which time the game was already out of reach. Overall, Kinne completed 14-of-24 for 123 yards and one touchdown. Trey Watts ran 15 times for 60 yards and a touchdown, and Willie Carter was the team's leading receiver with 5 catches for 54 yards and a touchdown.

=== North Texas ===
	1	2	3	4	Total
Golden Hurricane	14	14	13	0	41
Mean Green	0	3	0	21	24

=== UAB ===
	1	2	3	4	Total
Blazers	7	13	0	0	20
Golden Hurricane	10	14	6	7	37

October:October was a new month for Tulsa. TU began a winning streak which would extend through October to late in the season. TU began with North Texas on October 1, the final out-of-conference game of 2011. TU led 41–3 in the 3rd quarter before pulling the starters. Against Tulsa's, UNT scored 21 late points. On October 15, TU hosted UAB. TU's defense was shaky and allowed 20 first half points and led 24–20 at the half. TU pulled away, holding UAB scoreless in the second half and winning 37–20.

=== Rice ===
	1	2	3	4	Total
Golden Hurricane	17	7	0	14	38
Owls	0	10	3	7	20

On October 22, TU traveled to Houston to play Rice. TU's offense got off to a quick start, scoring 17 1st quarter points due to 3 turnovers forced by Tulsa's opportunistic defense and winning 38–20.

=== SMU ===
	1	2	3	4	Total
Mustangs	0	0	7	0	7
Golden Hurricane	10	14	14	0	38

On October 29, 2011, Tulsa's first year head coach Bill Blankenship faced the toughest C-USA opponent to date and the team picked to finish 3rd in C-USA West (behind Houston and Tulsa) in the pre-season media poll. However, SMU had exceeded preseason expectations at 5–2 after upsetting rival No. 19 TCU and falling only to Texas A&M and Southern Miss (who was 6–1 at the time). Furthermore, Tulsa had struggled against SMU under previous head coach Todd Graham, losing 2 straight and barely winning by an average of 6 points against two 1–11 teams in 2007 and 2008. Nevertheless, Tulsa prevailed with a dominant performance. TU scored quickly and got out to a 24–0 lead at half time thanks to 3 interceptions by CB Milton Howell and two rushing touchdowns by short-yardage specialist HB Alex Singleton. TU won 38–7, allowing only 1 score to one of the top offenses in the country and scoring 38 points against one of the top defenses in the country.

=== UCF ===
	1	2	3	4	Total
Golden Hurricane	7	6	3	8	24
Knights	7	7	0	3	17

In November Head Coach Bill Blankenship was entering his second toughest month of the year (after September) with a tough road game at Central Florida where Tulsa had struggled under previous head coach Todd Graham, losing two straight. As reported by tulsahurricane.com "UCF defense ranks in the top-six in the FBS for rushing, passing, passing efficiency, scoring and total defense". After trailing 14–13 at the half, TU prevailed 24–17, running out over 5 minutes of clock at the end of the game, denying UCF the opportunity to score. Tulsa gained 251 yards rushing, more than UCF had allowed all season at home (4 games). TU's 24 points also exceeded the total points UCF allowed at home all season

=== Marshall ===
	1	2	3	4	Total
Thundering Herd	3	0	14	0	17
Golden Hurricane	14	28	7	10	59

Tulsa headed home to host Marshall, one of the better teams in C-USA East division (eventually finished near top of East). Tulsa had struggled against Marshall under previous head coach Todd Graham, barely winning 38–31 against 3–9 UM in 2007 and 38–35 against 4–8 UM in 2008. This game had no such drama as Tulsa led 42–3 at the half and won its 11th straight C-USA game with a 59–17 win over Marshall.

=== UTEP ===
	1	2	3	4	Total
Miners	6	9	0	13	28
Golden Hurricane	14	15	21	7	57

Next, the Tulsa Golden Hurricane traveled to El Paso to match up with the UTEP Miners in the Sun Bowl. Tulsa had struggled against UTEP under previous head coach Todd Graham, and had not won in El Paso since 2003. Under Graham, Tulsa had lost its previous two games in El Paso by 5 points total against two UTEP teams which finished 4–8. This time, there was no doubt after Tulsa led 50–15 in the 3rd quarter as TU won 57–28. TU's defense struggled early, giving up 15 points in the first half, but shut down UTEP for the pivotal 3rd quarter in which Tulsa seized control. Two scores by UTEP late in the 4th quarter allowed UTEP to be the first C-USA team to score more than 20 points against TU.

=== Houston ===
	1	2	3	4	Total
No. 7 Cougars	6	7	14	21	48
Golden Hurricane	10	0	6	0	16

Finally, the University of Tulsa Golden Hurricane had an opportunity to accomplish one of the goals set long before the season started: Win the C-USA Western Division Title and play the C-USA Championship game. The task was not easy. Undefeated No. 8 Houston Cougars (11–0, 7–0 in C-USA) were coming to Tulsa to face off against Tulsa Golden Hurricane (8–3, 7–0 in C-USA). The winner was guaranteed to host the C-USA Championship game against the C-USA Eastern Division Title

=== BYU–Armed Forces Bowl ===
	1	2	3	4	Total
Cougars	3	7	7	7	24
Golden Hurricane	7	7	0	7	21
