= 2011 Rice Owls football team =

American college football season

2011 Rice Owls football
- Conference: Conference USA
- West
- Record: 4–8 (3–5 C-USA)
- Head coach: David Bailiff (5th season)
- Offensive coordinator: John Reagan (1st season)
- Offensive scheme: Spread
- Defensive coordinator: Chuck Driesbach (5th season)
- Base defense: 4–3
- Home stadium: Rice Stadium

2011 Conference USA football standings
	Conf.			Overall
Team	W		L	W		L
East Division
No. 20 Southern Miss x$	6	–	2	12	–	2
Marshall	5	–	3	7	–	6
East Carolina	4	–	4	5	–	7
UAB	3	–	5	3	–	9
UCF	3	–	5	5	–	7
Memphis	1	–	7	2	–	10
West Division
No. 18 Houston x	8	–	0	13	–	1
Tulsa	7	–	1	8	–	5
SMU	5	–	3	8	–	5
Rice	3	–	5	4	–	8
UTEP	2	–	6	5	–	7
Tulane	1	–	7	2	–	11
Championship: Southern Miss 49, Houston 28
$ – Conference champion; x – Division champion/co-champions; As of January 10, 2012; Rankings from AP Poll

The 2011 Rice Owls football team represented Rice University in the 2011 NCAA Division I FBS football season. The Owls were led by fifth-year head coach David Bailiff and played their home games at Rice Stadium. They are a member of the West Division of Conference USA. They finished the season 4–8, 3–5 in C-USA play to finish in fourth place in the West Division.

== Schedule ==
Date	Time	Opponent	Site	TV	Result	Attendance
September 3	6:00 pm	at No. 24 Texas*	Darrell K Royal–Texas Memorial Stadium; Austin, TX	LHN	L 9–34	101,624
September 10	2:30 pm	Purdue*	Rice Stadium; Houston, TX	CBSSN	W 24–22	25,317
September 24	6:00 pm	at No. 19 Baylor*	Floyd Casey Stadium; Waco, TX	FSN	L 31–56	40,088
October 1	6:30 pm	at Southern Miss	M. M. Roberts Stadium; Hattiesburg, MS	CSS	L 24–48	28,656
October 8	11:30 am	Memphis	Rice Stadium; Houston, TX	CSS	W 28–6	14,179
October 15	2:00 pm	at Marshall	Joan C. Edwards Stadium; Huntington, WV		L 20–24	27,504
October 22	6:00 pm	Tulsa	Rice Stadium; Houston, TX	FSN	L 20–38	17,314
October 27	7:00 pm	at No. 18 Houston	Robertson Stadium; Houston, TX (rivalry)	FSN	L 34–73	32,112
November 5	2:30 pm	UTEP^{†}	Rice Stadium; Houston, TX	FSN	W 41–37	14,372
November 12	11:00 am	at Northwestern*	Ryan Field; Evanston, IL	BTN	L 6–28	26,886
November 19	2:30 pm	Tulane	Rice Stadium; Houston, TX		W 19–7	15,461
November 26	11:00 am	at SMU	Gerald J. Ford Stadium; University Park, TX (Mayor's Cup)	FSN	L 24–27	23,326
*Non-conference game; ^{†}Homecoming; Rankings from Coaches' Poll released prior to the game; All times are in Central time

== Roster ==
2011 Rice Owls football team roster
Players
Coaches
Offense

Pos.	#	Name	Class
RB	2	Sam McGuffie	Jr
QB	3	Taylor Cook	Jr
WR	4	Randy Kitchens	Sr
WR	5	Lovett Gibson	Fr
QB	6	Driphus Jackson	Fr
QB	7	Nick Fanuzzi	Sr
OL	70	Bobby Janisch	So
OL	71	Davon Allen	Sr
WR	80	Drew Travis	Fr
WR	81	Donte Moore	So
TE	82	Luke Willson	Jr
WR	83	Andre Gautreaux	So
WR	84	Klein Kubiak	So
WR	85	Mario Hull	Fr
WR	87	Michael Patterson	Sr
WR	88	Vance McDonald	Jr

Defense

Pos.	#	Name	Class

Special teams

Pos.	#	Name	Class

Head coach

- David Bailiff

Coordinators/assistant coaches

Legend

- (C) Team captain
- (S) Suspended
- (I) Ineligible
- Injured
- Redshirt

Roster
