= 2011 Southern Miss Golden Eagles football team =

American college football season

2011 Southern Miss Golden Eagles football

Conference USA champion C-USA East Division champion Hawaii Bowl champion

C-USA Championship Game, W 49–28 vs. Houston

Hawaii Bowl, W 24–17 vs. Nevada
- Conference: Conference USA
- East Division

Ranking
- Coaches: No. 19
- AP: No. 20
- Record: 12–2 (6–2 C-USA)
- Head coach: Larry Fedora (4th season)
- Offensive coordinator: Blake Anderson (2nd season)
- Offensive scheme: Spread
- Co-defensive coordinators: Dan Disch (1st season); David Duggan (1st season)
- Base defense: 4–3
- Home stadium: M. M. Roberts Stadium

2011 Conference USA football standings
	Conf.			Overall
Team	W		L	W		L
East Division
No. 20 Southern Miss x$	6	–	2	12	–	2
Marshall	5	–	3	7	–	6
East Carolina	4	–	4	5	–	7
UAB	3	–	5	3	–	9
UCF	3	–	5	5	–	7
Memphis	1	–	7	2	–	10
West Division
No. 18 Houston x	8	–	0	13	–	1
Tulsa	7	–	1	8	–	5
SMU	5	–	3	8	–	5
Rice	3	–	5	4	–	8
UTEP	2	–	6	5	–	7
Tulane	1	–	7	2	–	11
Championship: Southern Miss 49, Houston 28
$ – Conference champion; x – Division champion/co-champions; As of January 10, 2012; Rankings from AP Poll

The 2011 Southern Miss Golden Eagles football team represented the University of Southern Mississippi in the 2011 NCAA Division I FBS football season. The Golden Eagles were led by fourth-year head coach Larry Fedora and played their home games at M. M. Roberts Stadium. They are a member of the East Division of Conference USA. They finished the season 12–2, 7–2 in C-USA play. They were champions of the East Division and defeated undefeated Houston, 49–28, in the C-USA Championship Game to become conference champions. They were invited to the Hawaii Bowl, where they defeated Nevada, 24–17.

Fedora resigned at the end of the regular season to become the head coach at North Carolina. He stayed on and coached the Golden Eagles in the Hawaii Bowl and finished at Southern Miss with a four-year record of 34–19. South Carolina assistant head coach Ellis Johnson took over as head coach in 2012.

== Pre-season ==
=== Top 25 rankings ===
During the pre-season, Southern Miss was ranked in several notable top 25 polls. Phil Steele ranked the team as No. 20. Outside the Top 25, Southern Miss was ranked as No. 55 by Sporting News, No. 31 in the AP Poll, and No. 42 in the Coaches' Poll.

== Schedule ==
Date	Time	Opponent	Rank	Site	TV	Result	Attendance
September 3	9:00 pm	Louisiana Tech*		M. M. Roberts Stadium; Hattiesburg, Mississippi (Rivalry in Dixie)	FSN	W 19–17	22,356
September 10	2:30 pm	at Marshall		Joan C. Edwards Stadium; Huntington, West Virginia	CSS	L 20–26	24,247
September 17	6:00 pm	Southeastern Louisiana*		M. M. Roberts Stadium; Hattiesburg, Mississippi		W 52–6	27,433
September 24	3:30 pm	at Virginia*		Scott Stadium; Charlottesville, Virginia	FS South	W 30–24	43,220
October 1	6:30 pm	Rice		M. M. Roberts Stadium; Hattiesburg, Mississippi	CSS	W 48–24	28,656
October 8	3:30 pm	at Navy*		Navy–Marine Corps Memorial Stadium; Annapolis, Maryland	CBSSN	W 63–35	33,462
October 22	7:00 pm	SMU^{†}		M. M. Roberts Stadium; Hattiesburg, Mississippi	CBSSN	W 27–3	32,685
October 29	7:00 pm	at UTEP		Sun Bowl; El Paso, Texas	CBSSN	W 31–13	24,906
November 5	3:00 pm	at East Carolina		Dowdy–Ficklen Stadium; Greenville, North Carolina	CSS	W 48–28	50,345
November 12	7:00 pm	UCF	No. 25	M. M. Roberts Stadium; Hattiesburg, Mississippi	CBSSN	W 30–29	32,925
November 17	7:00 pm	at UAB	No. 22	Legion Field; Birmingham, Alabama	CBSSN	L 31–34	14,103
November 26	3:00 pm	Memphis		M. M. Roberts Stadium; Hattiesburg, Mississippi (Black and Blue Bowl)	CSS	W 44–7	26,347
December 3	11:00 am	vs. No. 7 Houston	No. 24	Robertson Stadium; Houston (C-USA Championship)	ABC	W 49–28	32,413
December 24	7:00 pm	vs. Nevada*	No. 22	Aloha Stadium; Honolulu, HI (Hawaii Bowl)	ESPN	W 24–17	32,630
*Non-conference game; ^{†}Homecoming; Rankings from AP Poll released prior to the game; All times are in Central time

== Poll rankings ==
Ranking movements Legend: ██ Increase in ranking ██ Decrease in ranking — = Not ranked RV = Received votes
	Week															
Poll	Pre	1	2	3	4	5	6	7	8	9	10	11	12	13	14	Final
AP	RV	RV	RV	RV	RV	RV	RV	RV	RV	RV	25	22	RV	24	22	20
Coaches	RV	RV	RV	RV	RV	RV	RV	RV	25	24	23	20	RV	23	21	19
Harris	Not released						RV	RV	RV	RV	23	20	RV	23	21	Not released
BCS	Not released							—	—	25	22	20	—	24	21	Not released
