= 2011 Conference USA Football Championship Game =

- Conference Championship
Southern Miss Golden Eagles	Houston Cougars
(10–2)	(12–0)
49	28
Head coach: Larry Fedora	Head coach: Kevin Sumlin
AP / Coaches / BCS; 24 / 23 / 24	AP / Coaches / BCS; 7 / 6 / 6
	1	2	3	4	Total
Southern Miss	7	14	21	7	49
Houston	0	14	7	7	28
- Date: December 3, 2011
- Season: 2011
- Stadium: Robertson Stadium
- Location: Houston, Texas
- MVP: Tracy Lampley (RB/WR, Southern Miss)
- Favorite: Houston by 12.5
- Referee: Wayne Winkler
- Attendance: 32,413

United States TV coverage
- Network: ABC
- Announcers: Mike Patrick; Craig James; Jeannine Edwards

2011 Conference USA football standings
	Conf.			Overall
Team	W		L	W		L
East Division
No. 20 Southern Miss x$	6	–	2	12	–	2
Marshall	5	–	3	7	–	6
East Carolina	4	–	4	5	–	7
UAB	3	–	5	3	–	9
UCF	3	–	5	5	–	7
Memphis	1	–	7	2	–	10
West Division
No. 18 Houston x	8	–	0	13	–	1
Tulsa	7	–	1	8	–	5
SMU	5	–	3	8	–	5
Rice	3	–	5	4	–	8
UTEP	2	–	6	5	–	7
Tulane	1	–	7	2	–	11
Championship: Southern Miss 49, Houston 28
$ – Conference champion; x – Division champion/co-champions; As of January 10, 2012; Rankings from AP Poll

The 2011 Conference USA Football Championship Game was played on December 3, 2011, at Robertson Stadium in Houston between Southern Miss and Houston—the winners of Conference USA's East and West Divisions, respectively.

Under C-USA rules, the championship game is hosted by the division champion with the best conference record. Houston finished a 12–0 regular season and won the West Division title and hosting rights with its 48–16 win over Tulsa on November 25. Southern Miss booked its place in the championship game the following day with a 44–7 win over Memphis.

A win for Houston in the conference's championship game would have earned the university its first bid in the Bowl Championship Series. For the first time, the C-USA Championship was broadcast on ABC, rather than ESPN2 in the past. Southern Miss ended up winning the game—defeating Houston by a score of 49–28.
