= 2011 Houston Cougars football team =

American college football season

2011 Houston Cougars football

C-USA West Division champion TicketCity Bowl champion

C-USA Championship Game, L 28–49 vs. Southern Miss

TicketCity Bowl, W 30–14 vs. Penn State
- Conference: Conference USA
- West Division

Ranking
- Coaches: No. 14
- AP: No. 18
- Record: 13–1 (8–0 C-USA)
- Head coach: Kevin Sumlin (4th season; regular season); Tony Levine (interim; bowl game)
- Co-offensive coordinators: Jason Phillips (2nd season); Kliff Kingsbury (2nd season)
- Offensive scheme: Air raid
- Defensive coordinator: Brian Stewart (2nd season)
- Base defense: 3–4
- Home stadium: Robertson Stadium

2011 Conference USA football standings
	Conf.			Overall
Team	W		L	W		L
East Division
No. 20 Southern Miss x$	6	–	2	12	–	2
Marshall	5	–	3	7	–	6
East Carolina	4	–	4	5	–	7
UAB	3	–	5	3	–	9
UCF	3	–	5	5	–	7
Memphis	1	–	7	2	–	10
West Division
No. 18 Houston x	8	–	0	13	–	1
Tulsa	7	–	1	8	–	5
SMU	5	–	3	8	–	5
Rice	3	–	5	4	–	8
UTEP	2	–	6	5	–	7
Tulane	1	–	7	2	–	11
Championship: Southern Miss 49, Houston 28
$ – Conference champion; x – Division champion/co-champions; As of January 10, 2012; Rankings from AP Poll

The 2011 Houston Cougars football team (also known as the Houston Cougars, Houston, or UH) represented the University of Houston in the 2011 NCAA Division I FBS football season. It was the 66th year of season play for Houston. The program was a member of Conference USA in its West Division.

The team was coached by fourth-year head football coach Kevin Sumlin, and played its home games at Robertson Stadium—a 32,000-seat stadium on campus in Houston. After missing a majority of the 2010 season due to injury, starting quarterback Case Keenum had returned for 2011.

The Cougars finished the regular season 12–0, setting a new school record for wins. It was also the first undefeated and untied regular season in the program's 66-year history; however, the team lost to Southern Miss 49–28 in the 2011 Conference USA Football Championship Game. Had the team won the championship game, Houston would have garnered its (and C-USA's) first-ever Bowl Championship Series berth, as well as its first major-bowl appearance since the 1985 Cotton Bowl. Instead, Houston played in the TicketCity Bowl against Penn State—at the site of the Cotton Bowl—beating Penn State 30–14.

== Pre-season ==
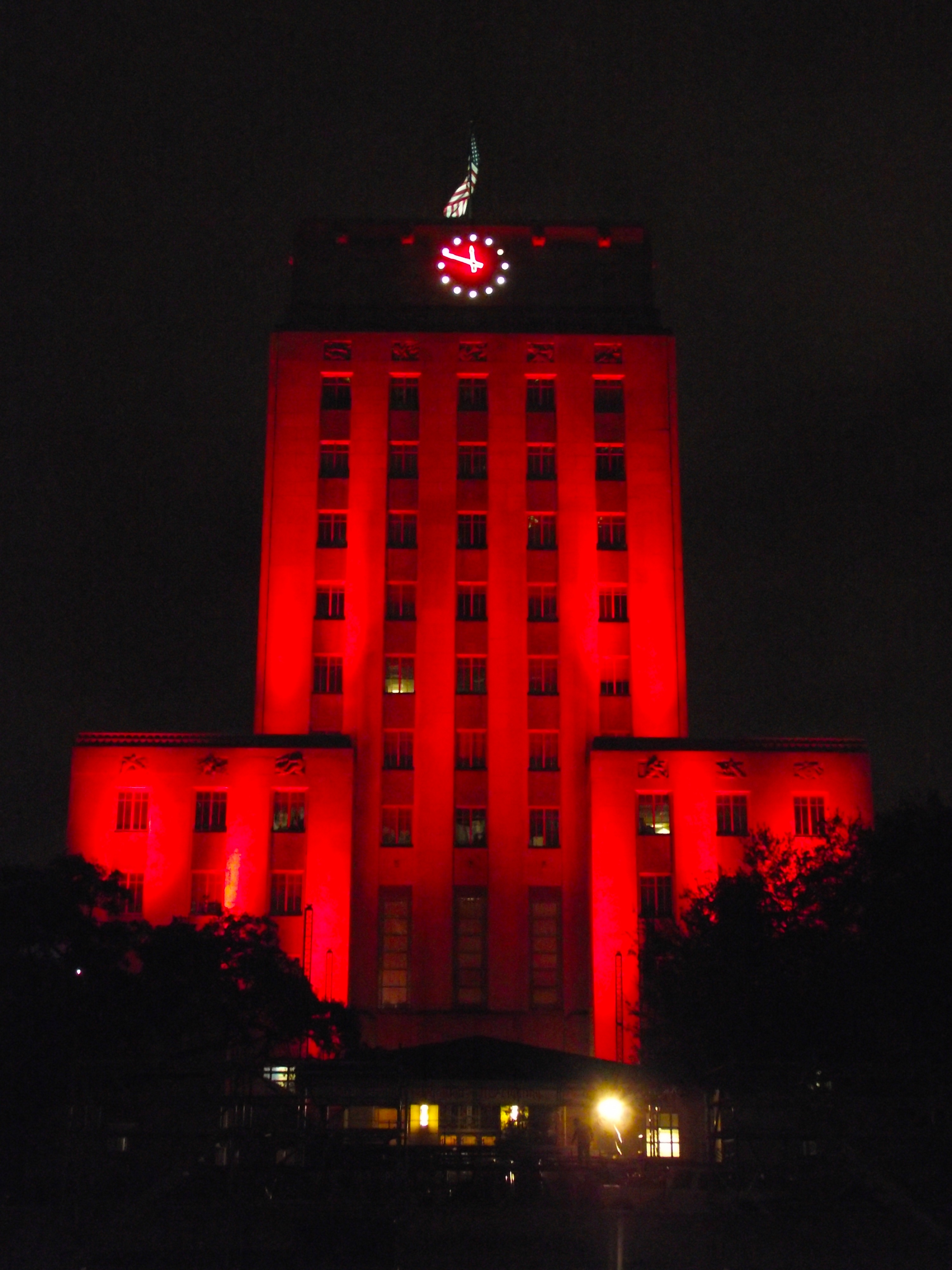
Houston City Hall illuminated red in celebration of Houston's undefeated regular season and C-USA Championship appearance

=== Top 25 rankings ===
During the pre-season, Houston was ranked in several notable top 25 polls. Phil Steele ranked the team as No. 21. Just outside the Top 25, Houston was ranked as No. 30 in ESPN.com's power rankings, No. 31 by Sporting News, No. 36 in the AP Poll, and No. 37 in the Coaches' Poll.

=== Awards & award watch lists ===
Bryce Beall

- Doak Walker Award watch list
- Conference USA Preseason offensive first team selection

Case Keenum

- Davey O'Brien Award semi-finalist
- Manning Award watch list
- Maxwell Award watch list
- Walter Camp Award watch list
- Conference USA Preseason Offensive Player of the Year
- Conference USA Preseason offensive first team selection
- Sammy Baugh Award
- Conference USA Most Valuable Player
- Conference USA Male Athlete of the Year

Chris Thompson

- Lombardi Award watch list
- Outland Trophy watch list
- Conference USA Preseason offensive first team selection

Marcus McGraw

- Lombardi Award watch list
- Conference USA Preseason defensive first team selection

Patrick Edwards

- Fred Biletnikoff Award watch list
- Conference USA Preseason offensive first team selection
- Conference USA Preseason special teams first team selection
- Conference USA Offensive Player of the Year

== Schedule ==
Date	Time	Opponent	Rank	Site	TV	Result	Attendance
September 3	2:30 p.m.	UCLA*		Robertson Stadium; Houston, TX	FSN	W 38–34	31,144
September 10	6:00 p.m.	at North Texas*		Apogee Stadium; Denton, TX	ESPN3	W 48–23	28,075
September 17	6:00 p.m.	at Louisiana Tech*		Joe Aillet Stadium; Ruston, LA	ESPN3	W 35–34	24,628
September 24	7:00 p.m.	Georgia State*		Robertson Stadium; Houston, TX	CSS	W 56–0	32,005
September 29	7:00 p.m.	at UTEP		Sun Bowl Stadium; El Paso, TX	CBS SN	W 49–42	24,111
October 8	6:00 p.m.	East Carolina		Robertson Stadium; Houston, TX	CBS SN	W 56–3	30,126
October 22	3:30 p.m.	Marshall^{†}	No. 21	Robertson Stadium; Houston, TX	CSS	W 63–28	32,107
October 27	7:00 p.m.	Rice	No. 18	Robertson Stadium; Houston, TX (rivalry)	FSN	W 73–34	32,112
November 5	6:00 p.m.	at UAB	No. 14	Legion Field; Birmingham, AL	CBS SN	W 56–13	13,909
November 10	7:00 p.m.	at Tulane	No. 11	Mercedes-Benz Superdome; New Orleans, LA	CBS SN	W 73–17	17,657
November 19	2:30 p.m.	SMU	No. 11	Robertson Stadium; Houston, TX (College GameDay / rivalry)	FSN	W 37–7	32,207
November 25	11:00 a.m.	at Tulsa	No. 8	Chapman Stadium; Tulsa, OK	FSN	W 48–16	29,015
December 3	11:00 a.m.	No. 24 Southern Miss	No. 7	Robertson Stadium; Houston, TX (C-USA Championship)	ABC	L 28–49	32,413
January 2	11:00 a.m.	vs. No. 24 Penn State*	No. 20	Cotton Bowl; Dallas, TX (TicketCity Bowl)	ESPNU	W 30–14	46,817
*Non-conference game; ^{†}Homecoming; Rankings from AP Poll released prior to the game

== Game summaries ==
=== UCLA ===
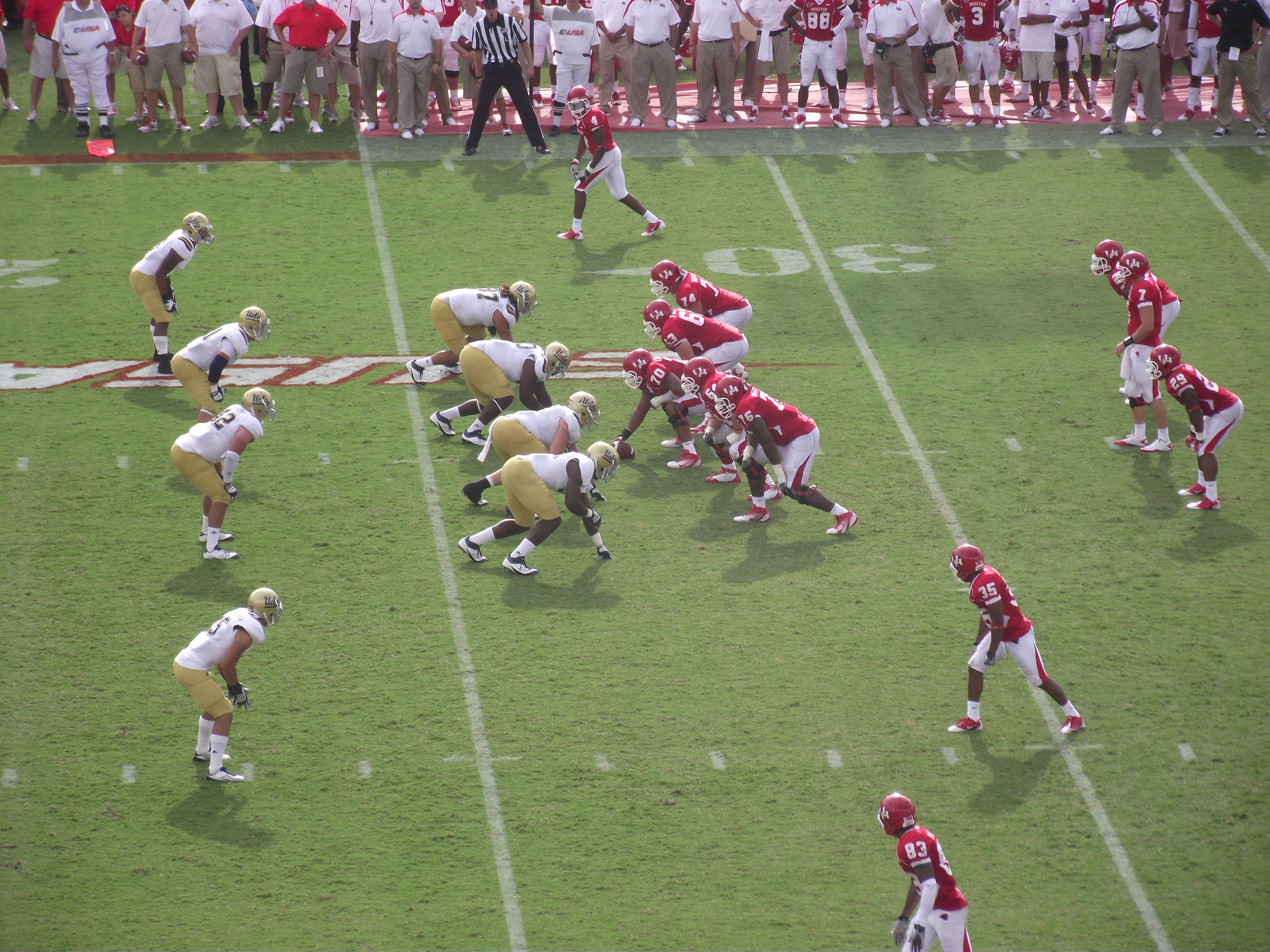
UCLA at Houston

	1	2	3	4	Total
Bruins	0	14	14	6	34
Cougars	10	21	0	7	38

UCLA of the Pac-12 Conference traveled to Robertson Stadium in Houston's season opener. The Bruins led the overall series with Houston 3–2, which started on September 17, 1977, in the Astrodome. In 2010, the Bruins had defeated the Cougars 31–13 in the Rose Bowl.

The game's first quarter consisted of a 10–0 lead of Houston over UCLA. Senior running back Michael Hayes was credited with the first touchdown of the game. Redshirt junior Matt Hogan was responsible for the PAT as well as a 35-yard field goal later in the quarter. Although the Bruins' Johnathan Franklin and Joseph Fauria with quarterback Richard Brehaut managed to score two touchdowns, Houston still outscored UCLA in the second quarter. Michael Hayes scored another touchdown for Houston, and fellow senior running back Bryce Beall. Senior wide receiver Tyron Carrier scored the third Cougar touchdown when he received a 23-yard pass from senior quarterback Case Keenum before the half. Houston went to the locker room with a 31–14 lead.

In the second half, UCLA struck back to make the game close, as UCLA scored an unanswered 14 points in the third quarter with two touchdowns by Derrick Coleman and Brehaut respectively. However, the both teams' offenses struggled in the fourth quarter. Houston's senior offensive lineman Chris Thompson recovered a fumble from teammate Bryce Beall in the UCLA end zone to receive credit for a touchdown. Following the score, UCLA's Brehaut completed an 11-yard pass to Anthony Barr in another UCLA touchdown. Freshman kicker Kip Smith's kick was blocked by Houston, thus halting the PAT. Houston won the game with a 38–34 score.

=== At North Texas ===
	1	2	3	4	Total
Cougars	17	3	21	7	48
Mean Green	7	10	0	6	23

Houston traveled to Denton, Texas, to face North Texas of the Sun Belt Conference for the thirteenth time in program history. A former conference-mate of Houston in the Lone Star Conference, Gulf Coast Conference, and Missouri Valley Conference, the Mean Green led the all-time series against the Cougars 7–5. However, Houston had won their last three games against North Texas. The game marked the opening of a new home for the Mean Green at Apogee Stadium. Its attendance was 28,075, and was the third-largest in North Texas' history.

=== At Louisiana Tech ===
	1	2	3	4	Total
Cougars	0	7	7	21	35
Bulldogs	7	13	14	0	34

In Houston's second away game of the season, the team traveled to Joe Aillet Stadium in Ruston, Louisiana, to compete against Louisiana Tech of the Western Athletic Conference for the sixth time in history. The two programs had first met in 1948, and Houston led the all-time series 3–2. Louisiana Tech's record was 1–1, and was coached by second-year Sonny Dykes. With a lopsided 14–34 score heading into the fourth quarter, Houston managed to achieve their biggest comeback in school history by shutting out the Bulldog offense, and scoring 21 points to win the game.

Louisiana Tech took a 7–0 lead after Lennon Creer scored a 1-yard rushing touchdown with 11:12 left in the first quarter. Tech extended their lead over Houston to 10–0 after Matt Nelson kicked a 30-yard field goal with 10:10 left in the second quarter. Houston scored its first points of the night with 7:21 left in the second quarter when Case Keenum connected with Michael Hayes for a 54-yard touchdown to cut Louisiana Tech's lead to 10–7. Louisiana Tech answered with a 2-yard touchdown run by Ray Holley and a 47-yard field goal by Nelson to take the 20–7 lead at halftime.

Both teams traded punts to open the third quarter. With 6:47 left in the third quarter, Louisiana Tech QB Nick Isham completed a 16-yard touchdown pass to Quinton Patton to increase Tech's lead to 27–7. After Quinn Giles intercepted a pass by Case Keenum, Ray Holley scored his second rushing touchdown in the game on a 7-yard TD run to bring the Louisiana Tech lead to 34–7 with 5:11 left in the third quarter. Houston began their comeback when Keenum completed a 50-yard touchdown pass with 4:27 left in the third quarter to make the score Louisiana Tech 34, Houston 14. Bryce Beall ran for a 2-yard touchdown to cut the Tech lead to 34–21 with 12:53 left in the fourth quarter. After Houston recovered a fumble by Tech's Ray Holley, Houston completed an 80-yard drive down the field with a 4-yard touchdown run by Beall to make the score 34–28 Louisiana Tech with 7:25 remaining in the game. Houston took its first lead of the night after Keenum threw a 32-yard touchdown pass to make the score Houston 35–34 with 1:36 remaining in the game. Houston went on to win the game after Tech turned the ball over on downs in the last minute of the game.

Louisiana Tech generated 444 yards on offense on 98 plays. Lennon Creer and Ray Holley combined for 47 carries, 161 yards, and three touchdowns on the ground, as Louisiana Tech ran 66 rushing plays in the game which is tied for the 2nd-most carries by a Bulldog team in the history of the program. Quinton Patton caught five passes for 82 yards and one touchdown for the evening and was later named to the Fred Biletnikoff Award Watch List after the game as a result of his play through the first three games of the 2011 college football season. The crowd of 24,628 at Joe Aillet Stadium for the Louisiana Tech vs. Houston marked the sixth-largest crowd for a Louisiana Tech football game at Joe Aillet Stadium.

Scoring summary

Quarter	Time	Drive			Team	Scoring information	Score	
Quarter	Time	Plays	Yards	TOP	Team	Scoring information	Houston	LA Tech
1	11:12	4	8	1:17	LA Tech	Lennon Creer 1-yard touchdown run, Matt Nelson kick good	0	7
2	10:10	15	57	4:43	LA Tech	30-yard field goal by Matt Nelson	0	10
2	7:21	8	74	2:49	Houston	Michael Hayes 54-yard touchdown reception from Case Keenum, Matt Hogan kick good	7	10
2	4:02	11	77	3:19	LA Tech	Ray Holley 2-yard touchdown run, Matt Nelson kick good	7	17
2	0:02	9	49	2:14	LA Tech	47-yard field goal by Matt Nelson	7	20
3	6:47	12	64	4:28	LA Tech	Quinton Patton 16-yard touchdown reception from Nick Isham, Matt Nelson kick good	7	27
3	5:11	5	43	1:23	LA Tech	Ray Holley 7-yard touchdown run, Matt Nelson kick good	7	34
3	4:27	3	80	0:44	Houston	Patrick Edwards 50-yard touchdown reception from Case Keenum, Matt Hogan kick good	14	34
4	12:53	9	64	3:17	Houston	Bryce Beall 2-yard touchdown run, Matt Hogan kick good	21	34
4	7:25	9	80	2:48	Houston	Bryce Beall 4-yard touchdown run, Matt Hogan kick good	28	34
4	1:36	6	84	1:10	Houston	Patrick Edwards 32-yard touchdown reception from Case Keenum, Matt Hogan kick good	35	34
"TOP" = time of possession. For other American football terms, see Glossary of American football.							35	34

=== Georgia State ===
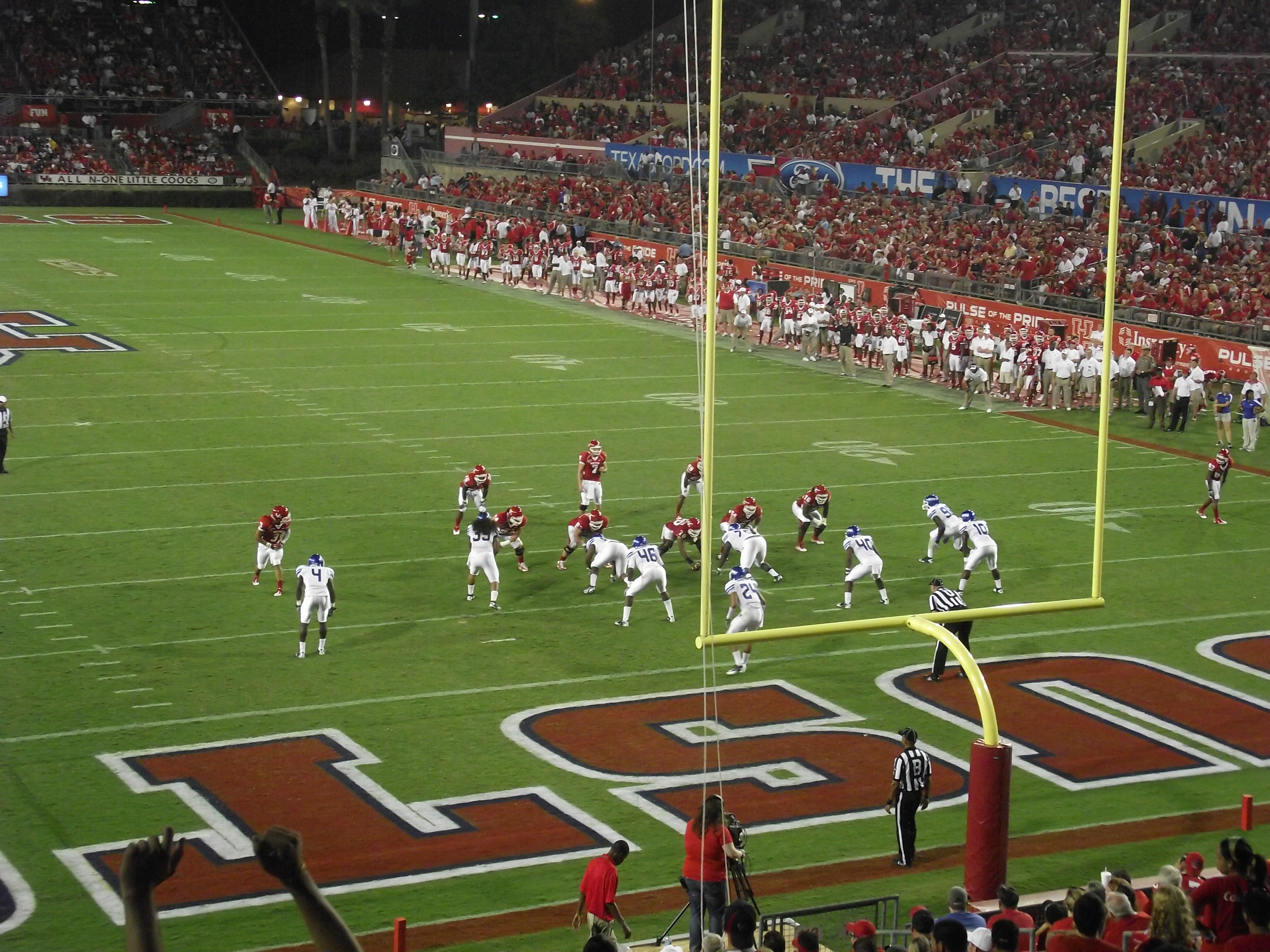
Georgia State at Houston

	1	2	3	4	Total
Panthers	0	0	0	0	0
Cougars	21	14	14	7	56

Houston returned home for their game against Georgia State. An NCAA Division I FCS independent, Georgia State was coached by Bill Curry, and had a 1–2 record at this point in the season. This was the first meeting between the two teams, and it marked the end of Houston's out-of-conference schedule. With a score of 56–0, this was Houston's first shutout victory since the 1999 season, when they defeated Louisiana–Lafayette 45–0. Senior quarterback Case Keenum threw for 415 yards, and two touchdowns before being replaced by Cotton Turner in the third quarter of the game.

A sell-out game with 32,005 in attendance, the matchup was regionally televised on Comcast Sports Southwest.

=== At UTEP ===
	1	2	3	4	Total
Cougars	0	21	17	11	49
Miners	14	7	14	7	42

=== East Carolina ===
	1	2	3	4	Total
Pirates	3	0	0	0	3
Cougars	14	21	7	14	56

=== Marshall ===
	1	2	3	4	Total
Thundering Herd	7	7	7	7	28
No. 21 Houston	14	21	14	14	63

Case Keenum became the Football Bowl Subdivision's career leader in total offense, throwing for 376 yards and tying his career high with six touchdown passes as Houston beat Marshall 63–28. The senior quarterback needed 130 yards to eclipse the record (16,910 yards) set by Hawaii's Timmy Chang from 2000–04. He moved past Chang on a 30-yard pass to Justin Johnson with 3:56 left in the first quarter. A.J. Graham threw two touchdown passes and ran for a score for Marshall, which lost handily despite gaining 506 yards and winning possession time by 24 minutes.

External link:

=== Rice ===
	1	2	3	4	Total
Owls	17	3	14	0	34
No. 18 Houston	14	24	28	7	73

=== At UAB ===
	1	2	3	4	Total
No. 14 Houston	7	14	14	21	56
Blazers	7	3	3	0	13

=== At Tulane ===
	1	2	3	4	Total
No. 11 Houston	0	35	24	14	73
Green Wave	0	10	0	7	17

=== SMU ===
	1	2	3	4	Total
Mustangs	0	0	0	7	7
No. 11 Cougars	3	10	10	14	37

This game marked the 26th meeting of the SMU Mustangs and the Houston Cougars. They last met in the previous season on October 23, 2010, where Houston defeated SMU with a final score of 45–20. Following Houston's 37–7 victory, Houston now leads the series 17–9–1.

The game was previewed on ESPN's College GameDay, where it was broadcast live from the University of Houston campus outside of the Cullen Performance Hall. It was the first time that Houston had hosted an episode of the show, and the first time that it had visited a Conference USA school. Cougar alumnus Carl Lewis appeared as a guest on the show. The game itself was nationally broadcast on Fox Sports Net.

=== At Tulsa ===
	1	2	3	4	Total
No. 8 Cougars	6	7	14	21	48
Golden Hurricane	10	0	6	0	16

The University of Tulsa Golden Hurricane had an opportunity to accomplish one of the goals set long before the season started: Win the C-USA Western Division Title and play the C-USA Championship game. The task was not easy. Undefeated #8 Houston Cougars (11–0, 7–0 in C-USA) were coming to Tulsa to face off against Tulsa Golden Hurricane (8–3, 7–0 in C-USA). The winner was guaranteed to host the C-USA Championship game against the C-USA Eastern Division Title. The Golden Hurricane kept the game close for the first half, but 457 yards and 5 Touchdowns by Case Keenum proved to be too much for the Golden Hurricane to keep up with.

=== No. 24 Southern Miss (C-USA Championship) ===
	1	2	3	4	Total
No. 24 Golden Eagles	7	14	21	7	49
No. 7 Cougars	0	14	7	7	28

=== Vs. No. 24 Penn State (TicketCity Bowl) ===
No. 20 Houston vs. No. 24 Penn State

Team	1	2	3	4	Total
• No. 20 Cougars	17	7	3	3	30
No. 24 Nittany Lions	0	7	7	0	14

- Date: January 2
- Location: Cotton Bowl, Dallas, TX
- Game start: 12:00 p.m. EST
- TV announcers (ESPNU): Clay Matvick, Danny Kanell and Lisa Salters

Scoring summary
1	13:08	HOU	Patrick Edwards 40-yard pass from Case Keenum (Matt Hogan kick)	HOU 7-0
1	9:12	HOU	Matt Hogan 35-yard field goal	HOU 10-0
1	2:35	HOU	Justin Johnson 8-yard pass from Case Keenum (Matt Hogan kick)	HOU 17-0
2	5:57	PSU	Stephfon Green 6-yard run (Anthony Fera kick)	HOU 17-7
2	1:43	HOU	Patrick Edwards 75-yard pass from Case Keenum (Matt Hogan kick)	HOU 24-7
3	4:21	HOU	Matt Hogan 38-yard field goal	HOU 27-7
3	2:38	PSU	Justin Brown 69-yard pass from Rob Bolden (Anthony Fera kick)	HOU 27-14
4	14:52	HOU	Matt Hogan 22-yard field goal	HOU 30-14

== Roster ==
2011 Houston Cougars football team roster
Players			Coaches
Offense: Pos. / # / Name / Class; QB / 7 / Case Keenum / Sr	Defense: Pos. / # / Name / Class; DB / 2 / D. J. Hayden / Jr	Special teams: Pos. / # / Name / Class	Head coach: Kevin Sumlin; Coordinators/assistant coaches Legend: (C) Team captain; (S) Suspended; (I) Ineligible; Injured; Redshirt; Roster

== Poll rankings ==
Ranking movements Legend: ██ Increase in ranking ██ Decrease in ranking RV = Received votes
	Week															
Poll	Pre	1	2	3	4	5	6	7	8	9	10	11	12	13	14	Final
AP	RV	RV	RV	RV	RV	RV	25	21	18	14	11	11	8	7	20	18
Coaches	RV	RV	RV	RV	RV	RV	22	20	18	14	11	10	7	6	17	14
Harris	Not released						24	22	18	14	11	10	7	6	17	Not released
BCS	Not released							19	17	13	11	11	8	6	19	Not released
