= 2011 Tulane Green Wave football team =

American college football season

2011 Tulane Green Wave football
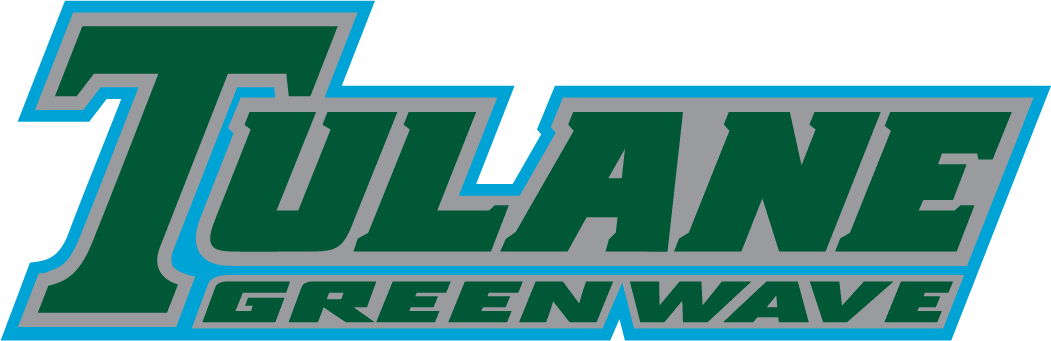
- Conference: Conference USA
- West
- Record: 2–11 (1–7 C-USA)
- Head coach: Bob Toledo (5th season; first 7 games); Mark Hutson (interim; remainder of season)
- Co-offensive coordinators: Greg Davis Jr. (1st season); Mark Hutson (1st season)
- Offensive scheme: West Coast
- Defensive coordinator: Steve Stanard (3rd season)
- Base defense: 4–3
- Home stadium: Louisiana Superdome

2011 Conference USA football standings
	Conf.			Overall
Team	W		L	W		L
East Division
No. 20 Southern Miss x$	6	–	2	12	–	2
Marshall	5	–	3	7	–	6
East Carolina	4	–	4	5	–	7
UAB	3	–	5	3	–	9
UCF	3	–	5	5	–	7
Memphis	1	–	7	2	–	10
West Division
No. 18 Houston x	8	–	0	13	–	1
Tulsa	7	–	1	8	–	5
SMU	5	–	3	8	–	5
Rice	3	–	5	4	–	8
UTEP	2	–	6	5	–	7
Tulane	1	–	7	2	–	11
Championship: Southern Miss 49, Houston 28
$ – Conference champion; x – Division champion/co-champions; As of January 10, 2012; Rankings from AP Poll

The 2011 Tulane Green Wave football team represented Tulane University in the 2011 NCAA Division I FBS football season. The Green Wave played their home games at the Louisiana Superdome, which was renamed the Mercedes-Benz Superdome on October 23. They competed in the West Division of Conference USA. The team was coached by interim head coach Mark Hutson following fifth-year head coach Bob Toledo's resignation on October 18 after starting the season 2–5. The team finished the season 2–11, 1–7 in C-USA - last place in the West Division.

== Schedule ==
Date	Time	Opponent	Site	TV	Result	Attendance	Source
September 3	2:30 pm	Southeastern Louisiana*	Louisiana Superdome; New Orleans, LA		W 47–33	15,912	
September 10	2:30 pm	Tulsa	Louisiana Superdome; New Orleans, LA	CST	L 3–31	19,752	
September 17	3:00 pm	at UAB	Legion Field; Birmingham, AL		W 49–10	17,658	
September 24	2:30 pm	at Duke*	Wallace Wade Stadium; Durham, NC	ESPN3	L 27–48	20,138	
October 1	11:00 am	at Army*	Michie Stadium; West Point, NY	CBSSN	L 6–45	31,235	
October 8	7:00 pm	Syracuse*	Louisiana Superdome; New Orleans, LA	CST/SNY	L 34–37	39,116	
October 15	2:30 pm	UTEP	Louisiana Superdome; New Orleans, LA	FCS Central	L 7–44	16,690	
October 22	2:30 pm	Memphis^{†}	Louisiana Superdome; New Orleans, LA		L 17–33	25,158	
October 29	2:30 pm	at East Carolina	Dowdy–Ficklen Stadium; Greenville, NC		L 14–34	49,410	
November 5	2:00 pm	at SMU	Gerald J. Ford Stadium; University Park, TX		L 24–45	20,106	
November 10	7:00 pm	No. 11 Houston	Mercedes-Benz Superdome; New Orleans, LA	CBSSN	L 17–73	17,657	
November 19	2:30 pm	at Rice	Rice Stadium; Houston, TX		L 7–19	15,461	
November 26	10:00 pm	at Hawaii*	Aloha Stadium; Honolulu, HI	Oceanic PPV	L 23–35	27,411	
*Non-conference game; ^{†}Homecoming; Rankings from AP Poll released prior to the game; All times are in Central time
