= 2011 East Carolina Pirates football team =

American college football season

2011 East Carolina Pirates football
- Conference: Conference USA
- East
- Record: 5–7 (4–4 C-USA)
- Head coach: Ruffin McNeill (2nd season)
- Offensive coordinator: Lincoln Riley (2nd season)
- Offensive scheme: Air raid
- Defensive coordinator: Brian Mitchell (2nd season)
- Base defense: 4–3
- Home stadium: Dowdy–Ficklen Stadium

2011 Conference USA football standings
	Conf.			Overall
Team	W		L	W		L
East Division
No. 20 Southern Miss x$	6	–	2	12	–	2
Marshall	5	–	3	7	–	6
East Carolina	4	–	4	5	–	7
UAB	3	–	5	3	–	9
UCF	3	–	5	5	–	7
Memphis	1	–	7	2	–	10
West Division
No. 18 Houston x	8	–	0	13	–	1
Tulsa	7	–	1	8	–	5
SMU	5	–	3	8	–	5
Rice	3	–	5	4	–	8
UTEP	2	–	6	5	–	7
Tulane	1	–	7	2	–	11
Championship: Southern Miss 49, Houston 28
$ – Conference champion; x – Division champion/co-champions; As of January 10, 2012; Rankings from AP Poll

The 2011 East Carolina Pirates football team represented East Carolina University in the 2011 NCAA Division I FBS football season. The Pirates were led by second year head coach Ruffin McNeill and played their home games at Dowdy–Ficklen Stadium. They were a member of the East Division of Conference USA. The Pirates finished 4–4 in Conference USA and 5–7 overall. For the first time since 2005, the Pirates were not eligible to play in a bowl game.

== Schedule ==
Date	Time	Opponent	Site	TV	Result	Attendance
September 3	7:00 pm	vs. No. 12 South Carolina*	Bank of America Stadium; Charlotte, NC	FSN	L 37–56	58,272
September 10	3:30 pm	No. 11 Virginia Tech*	Dowdy–Ficklen Stadium; Greenville, NC	FSN	L 10–17	49,404
September 24	3:30 pm	UAB	Dowdy–Ficklen Stadium; Greenville, NC	WITN	W 28–23	50,023
October 1	8:00 pm	North Carolina*	Dowdy–Ficklen Stadium; Greenville, NC	CBSSN	L 20–35	50,610
October 8	7:00 pm	at Houston	Robertson Stadium; Houston, TX	CBSSN	L 3–56	30,126
October 15	7:00 pm	at Memphis	Liberty Bowl Memorial Stadium; Memphis, TN	WITN	W 35–17	17,975
October 22	3:30 pm	at Navy*	Navy–Marine Corps Memorial Stadium; Annapolis, MD	CBSSN	W 38–35	34,612
October 29	3:30 pm	Tulane^{†}	Dowdy–Ficklen Stadium; Greenville, NC	WITN	W 34–13	49,410
November 5	4:00 pm	Southern Miss	Dowdy–Ficklen Stadium; Greenville, NC	CSS	L 28–48	50,345
November 12	8:00 pm	at UTEP	Sun Bowl; El Paso, TX	TWEP	L 17–22	25,571
November 19	7:00 pm	UCF	Dowdy–Ficklen Stadium; Greenville, NC	FSN	W 38–31	50,277
November 26	3:30 pm	at Marshall	Joan C. Edwards Stadium; Huntington, WV (rivalry)	CBSSN	L 27–34 ^{OT}	22,456
*Non-conference game; ^{†}Homecoming; Rankings from AP Poll released prior to the game; All times are in Eastern time

== Postseason awards ==
- Lance Lewis WR - Second Team All-Conference USA Offense
- Emmanuel Davis CB - Second Team All-Conference USA Defense
- Jeremy Grove LB - Honorable Mention All-Conference USA, C-USA Freshman-of-the-Year, C-USA All-Freshman Team, Freshman All-American
- Justin Hardy WR - C-USA All-Freshman Team
