= 2011 UCF Knights football team =

American college football season

2011 UCF Knights football
- Conference: Conference USA
- East
- Record: 5–7 (3–5 C-USA)
- Head coach: George O'Leary (8th season)
- Offensive coordinator: Charlie Taaffe (3rd season)
- Defensive coordinator: John Skladany (2nd season)
- Base defense: 4–3
- Home stadium: Bright House Networks Stadium

2011 Conference USA football standings
	Conf.			Overall
Team	W		L	W		L
East Division
No. 20 Southern Miss x$	6	–	2	12	–	2
Marshall	5	–	3	7	–	6
East Carolina	4	–	4	5	–	7
UAB	3	–	5	3	–	9
UCF	3	–	5	5	–	7
Memphis	1	–	7	2	–	10
West Division
No. 18 Houston x	8	–	0	13	–	1
Tulsa	7	–	1	8	–	5
SMU	5	–	3	8	–	5
Rice	3	–	5	4	–	8
UTEP	2	–	6	5	–	7
Tulane	1	–	7	2	–	11
Championship: Southern Miss 49, Houston 28
$ – Conference champion; x – Division champion/co-champions; As of January 10, 2012; Rankings from AP Poll

The 2011 UCF Knights football team represented the University of Central Florida in the 2011 NCAA Division I FBS football season. The Knights played in the East Division of Conference USA, and played their home games at Bright House Networks Stadium in Orlando, Florida. The Knights were led by head coach George O'Leary, who was in his eighth season with the team. They finished the season 5–7, 3–5 in C-USA play to finish in a tie for fourth place in the East Division.

All games were broadcast live on the UCF-ISP Sports radio network. The Knights flagship station was WYGM "740 The Game" in Orlando.

== Personnel ==
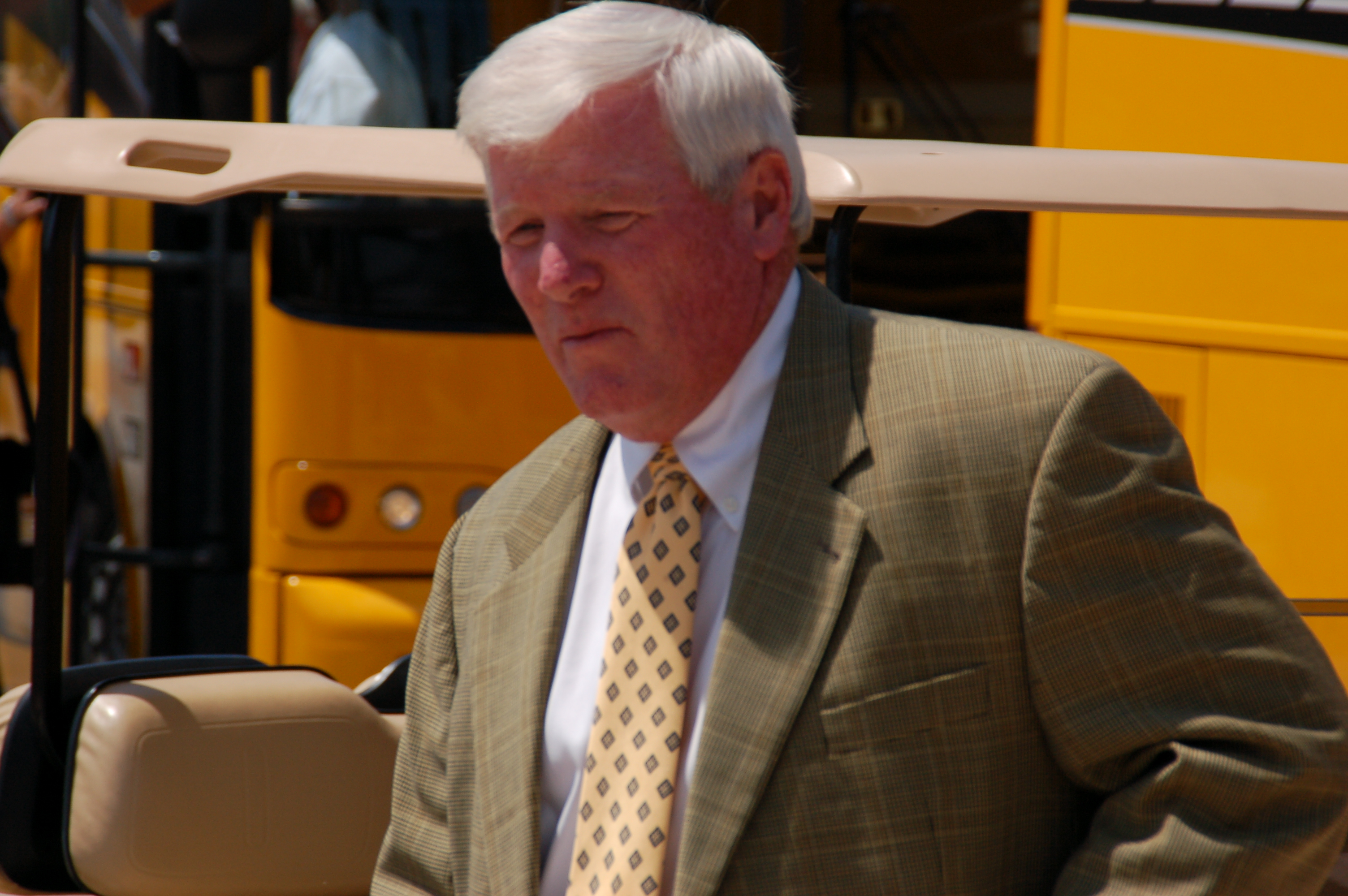
Head coach George O'Leary

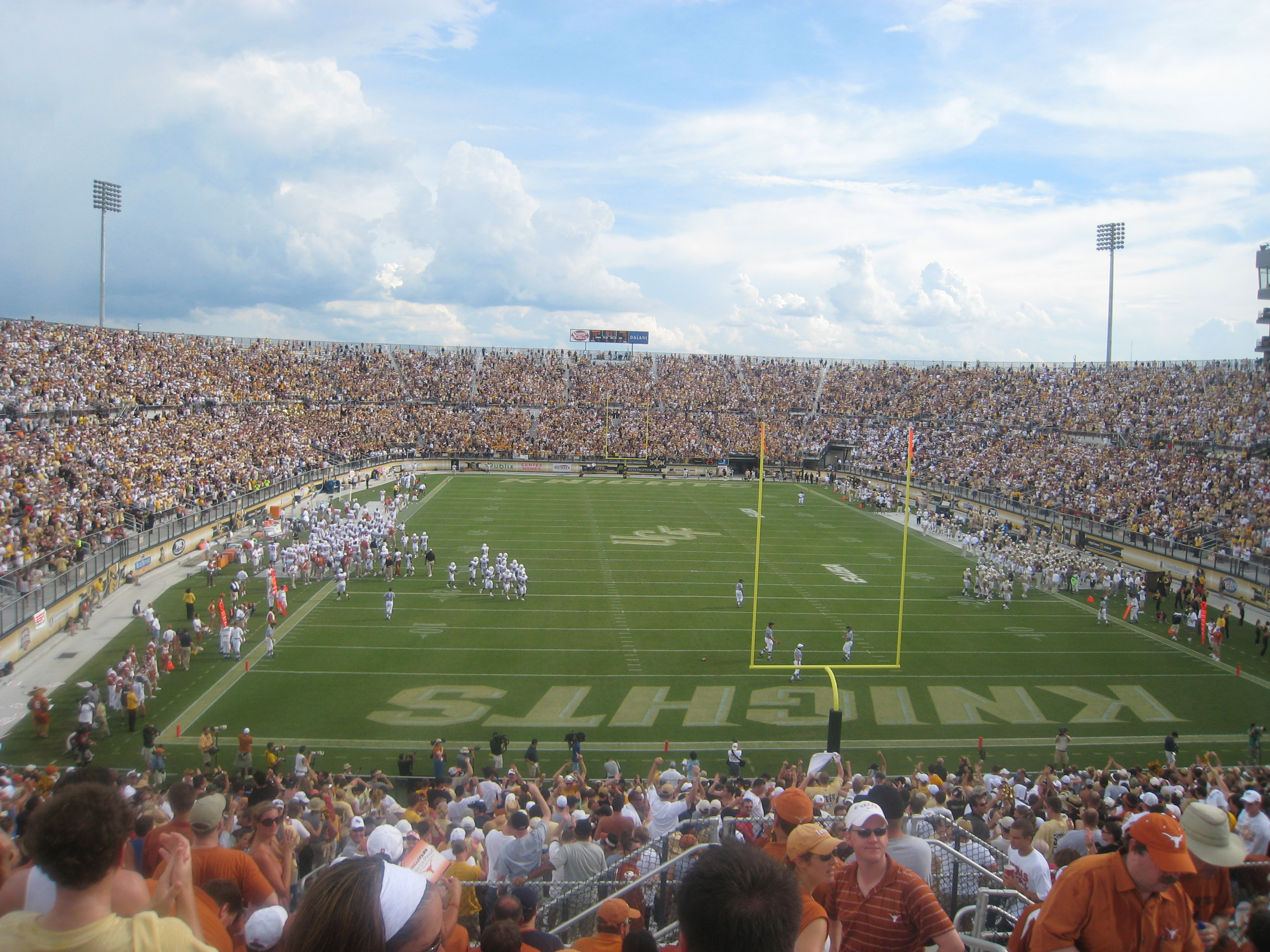
Bright House Networks Stadium

=== Coaching staff ===
2011 UCF Knights coaching staff
Head coaches: Head coach – George O'Leary; Offensive coaches: Offensive coordinator/quarterbacks – Charlie Taaffe; Running backs – Danny Barrett; Wide receivers – David Kelly (Resigned mid-season); Offensive line – Brent Key; Graduate assistant – Jonathon Ford; Defensive coaches: Defensive coordinator – John Skladany; Inside linebackers – Al Seamonson; Defensive backs – Sean Beckton; Defensive line – Jim Panagos; Graduate assistant – Mark Cammack	Special teams: Special teams coordinator/tight ends – Tim Salem; Administrative staff: Athletic Director (A.D.) – VADM. Al Harms (Interim); Assistant A.D. for Football Operations – Marty O'Leary; Director of player personnel – Albert Boone

=== Roster ===
2011 UCF Knights roster
2011 Roster from the University of Central Florida Knights
Quarterbacks: 2 Jeffrey Godfrey – sophomore; 5 Blake Bortles – (redshirt) freshman; Halfbacks: 13 Dontravius Floyd – (redshirt) Sophomre; 40 Brendan Kelly – (redshirt) junior; 44 Brandon MacMeekin – (redshirt) freshman; Fullbacks: 32 Billy Giovanetti – (redshirt) junior; Running backs: 17 Cedric Thompson – freshman; 23 Ariel Hoffman – (redshirt) freshman; 28 Latavius Murray – (redshirt) junior; 31 Kerlon Williams – (redshirt) senior; 34 Brynn Harvey – (redshirt) junior; 35 Ronnie Weaver – (redshirt) senior; Wide receivers: 3 A.J. Guyton – (redshirt) senior; 4 Rob Calabrese – senior; 7 Jared Greenaway – (redshirt) sophomore; 9 J.J. Worton – (redshirt) freshman; 14 Quincy McDuffie – junior; 29 Andrew Schultz – (redshirt) freshman; 80 Joshua Reese – (redshirt) freshman; 81 Rannell Hall – freshman; 82 Khymest Williams – (redshirt) senior; 87 James Rose – senior; 89 Jacques Mackeroy – freshman; Tight ends: 39 Kevin Garvy (redshirt) Junior; 84 Justin Tukes – freshman; 85 Kevin Miller – freshman; 86 D.J. Brown – (redshirt) sophomore; 88 Adam Nissley – (redshirt) senior	Offensive line: 61 Tarik Cook – freshman; 62 Rey Cunha – (redshirt) sophomore; 63 Jordan McCray – sophomore; 64 Justin McCray – sophomore; 65 Cliff McCray – (redshirt) senior; 66 Colton Odom – (redshirt) freshman; 68 Theo Goins – (redshirt) junior; 70 Chris Martin – (redshirt) sophomore; 72 Torrian Wilson – (redshirt) freshman; 73 Jordan Rae – (redshirt) junior; 74 Brandon Bryant – (redshirt) sophomore; 77 Nick Pieschel – (redshirt) senior; 79 Tony Jacob – (redshirt) freshman; Defensive ends: 53 Darius Nall – (redshirt) senior; 59 LeBranden Richardson – (redshirt) freshman; 90 Ash Weekley – (redshirt) junior; 97 Robert Pritchard – (redshirt) junior; Defensive tackles: 95 E.J. Dunston – sophomore; 96 Andrew Rice – (redshirt) freshman; 99 Jose Jose – sophomore; Defensive backs: 11 Sean Beckton – (redshirt) freshman; 15 Michael Easton – freshman; 18 Kemal Ishmael – junior; 19 A. J. Bouye – junior; 21 Jordan Ozerities – sophomore; 22 Jared Henry – freshman; 26 Clayton Geathers – (redshirt) freshman; 28 Connor Price – (redshirt) freshman; 29 Lyle Dankenbring – (redshirt) junior; 33 Jamar McClain – (redshirt) Freshman; 36 Woodley Cadet – (redshirt) Freshman; 37 Brandon Alexander – freshman; 38 Bruce Dukes – freshman; 39 Brandon Bragg – freshman	Defensive line: 47 Deion Green – freshman; 48 Toby Jackson – junior; 49 Cam Henderson – junior; 58 Troy Davis – junior; 69 Thomas Niles – freshman; 88 Troy Stafford – senior; 91 Victor Gray – (redshirt) sophomore; 92 Barry Snider – senior; 93 Josh Wofford – (redshirt) sophomore; 94 Dalton Wertz – freshman; 98 Joey Grant – freshman; Linebackers: 10 Leilon Willingham – freshman; 23 Willie Mitchell – freshman; 27 Jonathan Davis – junior; 30 Miles Pace – freshman; 41 Terrance Plummer – freshman; 42 Loren Robinson – (redshirt) junior; 43 Josh Hood – (redshirt) freshman; 45 Javen Harris – (redshirt) sophomore; 46 Ray Shipman – (redshirt) junior; 50 Josh Linam – senior; 51 D.J. Williams – (redshirt) junior; 52 Terran Buck – junior; 54 Ray Cottman – junior; 55 Vinny Mazzurco – (redshirt) senior; 56 Cody Ralston – (redshirt) freshman; 57 Troy Gray – freshman; Cornerbacks: 20 Josh Robinson – junior; Safeties: 25 Jarrett Swaby – (redshirt) sophomore	Punters/Kickers: 6 David Bohner – (redshirt) senior; 16 Nick Cattoi – senior; 18 Rodrigo Quirarte – freshman; 43 Jamie Boyle – junior; 83 Shawn Moffitt – freshman; 87 Sean Galvin – (redshirt) freshman; Snappers: 56 Scott Teal – (redshirt) freshman; 59 Matt Morrison – (redshirt) sophomore; 60 Charley Hughlett – senior; Terms: Freshman – A player in his first year.; Sophomore – A player in his second year.; Junior – A player in his third year.; Senior – A player in his fourth year.; Redshirt – A player who sat out a previous season.

=== Recruiting class ===
College recruiting (2011)
Name	Hometown	School	Height	Weight	40^{‡}	Commit date
Demetris Anderson; DT	Fort Pierce, FL	Westwood	6 ft 2 in (1.88 m)	285 lb (129 kg)	5.28	Aug 24, 2010
Demetris Anderson; DT	Recruit ratings: Scout: Rivals: (76)					
Brandon Bragg; DB	Orlando, FL	University	6 ft 1 in (1.85 m)	190 lb (86 kg)	N/A	Jun 9, 2010
Brandon Bragg; DB	Recruit ratings: Scout: Rivals: (72)					
Terran Buck; LB	Aurora, IL	College of DuPage	6 ft 2 in (1.88 m)	235 lb (107 kg)	4.6	Jan 17, 2011
Terran Buck; LB	Recruit ratings: Scout: Rivals:					
Tarik Cook; OL	Stone Mountain, GA	Stephenson	6 ft 2 in (1.88 m)	294 lb (133 kg)	N/A	Jun 17, 2010
Tarik Cook; OL	Recruit ratings: Scout: Rivals: (78)					
Raymond Cottman; LB	Glendale, AZ	Glendale C.C.	6 ft 2 in (1.88 m)	225 lb (102 kg)	4.7	Nov 15, 2010
Raymond Cottman; LB	Recruit ratings: Scout: Rivals:					
Jeremy Davis; DB	New Berlin, NY	New Berlin, NY Milford Academy	6 ft 0 in (1.83 m)	188 lb (85 kg)	N/A	Jan 30, 2011
Jeremy Davis; DB	Recruit ratings: Scout: Rivals: (78)					
Bruce Dukes; DB	Tyrone, GA	Sandy Creek	5 ft 10 in (1.78 m)	170 lb (77 kg)	4.46	Jan 24, 2011
Bruce Dukes; DB	Recruit ratings: Scout: Rivals: (76)					
Mike Easton; DB	Winter Haven, FL	Winter Haven	6 ft 0 in (1.83 m)	180 lb (82 kg)	N/A	Jun 14, 2010
Mike Easton; DB	Recruit ratings: Scout: Rivals: (45)					
Joey Grant; DE	Apopka, FL	Lake Brantley	6 ft 4 in (1.93 m)	240 lb (110 kg)	4.8	Jul 8, 2010
Joey Grant; DE	Recruit ratings: Scout: Rivals: (45)					
Troy Gray; LB	Kennesaw, GA	North Cobb	6 ft 1 in (1.85 m)	220 lb (100 kg)	4.5	Jan 23, 2011
Troy Gray; LB	Recruit ratings: Scout: Rivals: (78)					
Deion Green; DE	Orlando, FL	Edgewater	6 ft 3 in (1.91 m)	220 lb (100 kg)	4.7	Aug 9, 2010
Deion Green; DE	Recruit ratings: Scout: Rivals: (77)					
Rannell Hall; WR	Miami, FL	Carol City	6 ft 2 in (1.88 m)	175 lb (79 kg)	4.5	Jan 30, 2011
Rannell Hall; WR	Recruit ratings: Scout: Rivals: (45)					
Cameron Henderson; DE	Corsicana, TX	Navarro J.C.	6 ft 5 in (1.96 m)	250 lb (110 kg)	4.6	Dec 21, 2010
Cameron Henderson; DE	Recruit ratings: Scout: Rivals:					
Jared Henry; DB	Jacksonville, FL	First Coast	6 ft 1 in (1.85 m)	190 lb (86 kg)	4.6	Jan 24, 2011
Jared Henry; DB	Recruit ratings: Scout: Rivals: (78)					
Kentorius Jackson; DB	Milledgeville, GA	Georgia Military College	6 ft 2 in (1.88 m)	182 lb (83 kg)	N/A	Dec 13, 2010
Kentorius Jackson; DB	Recruit ratings: Scout: Rivals:					
Toby Jackson; DE	Corsicana, TX	Navarro J.C.	6 ft 5 in (1.96 m)	265 lb (120 kg)	4.7	Dec 14, 2010
Toby Jackson; DE	Recruit ratings: Scout: Rivals:					
Jose Jose; G	Miami, FL	Eastern Arizona J.C.	6 ft 3 in (1.91 m)	330 lb (150 kg)	5.63	Jan 17, 2011
Jose Jose; G	Recruit ratings: Scout: Rivals: (75)					
Jacques Mackeroy; WR	Lakeland, FL	Kathleen	6 ft 0 in (1.83 m)	200 lb (91 kg)	4.55	Jul 19, 2010
Jacques Mackeroy; WR	Recruit ratings: Scout: Rivals: (78)					
Kevin Miller; TE	Delran, NJ	Holy Cross	6 ft 4 in (1.93 m)	241 lb (109 kg)	4.7	Jul 8, 2010
Kevin Miller; TE	Recruit ratings: Scout: Rivals: (72)					
Willie Mitchell; LB	Deltona, FL	Pine Ridge	6 ft 1 in (1.85 m)	225 lb (102 kg)	N/A	Mar 26, 2010
Willie Mitchell; LB	Recruit ratings: Scout: Rivals: (78)					
Thomas Niles; DT	Gainesville, GA	Gainesville	6 ft 2 in (1.88 m)	260 lb (120 kg)	4.93	Jul 15, 2010
Thomas Niles; DT	Recruit ratings: Scout: Rivals: (77)					
Miles Pace; LB	Miami, FL	Miami Central	6 ft 0 in (1.83 m)	237 lb (108 kg)	4.7	Jul 25, 2010
Miles Pace; LB	Recruit ratings: Scout: Rivals: (77)					
Breshad Perriman; WR	Lithonia, GA	Arabia Mountain	6 ft 2 in (1.88 m)	180 lb (82 kg)	N/A	Jan 30, 2011
Breshad Perriman; WR	Recruit ratings: Scout: Rivals: (70)					
Terrance Plummer; LB	Orange Park, FL	Orange Park	6 ft 1 in (1.85 m)	221 lb (100 kg)	N/A	Jan 24, 2011
Terrance Plummer; LB	Recruit ratings: Scout: Rivals: (78)					
DaMarcus Smith; QB	Louisville, KY	Seneca	6 ft 1 in (1.85 m)	180 lb (82 kg)	4.64	Feb 4, 2011
DaMarcus Smith; QB	Recruit ratings: Scout: Rivals: (77)					
Cedric Thompson; RB	Miramar, FL	Everglades	6 ft 0 in (1.83 m)	200 lb (91 kg)	N/A	Jun 29, 2010
Cedric Thompson; RB	Recruit ratings: Scout: Rivals: (73)					
Justin Tukes; TE	Sylvester, GA	Worth County	6 ft 5 in (1.96 m)	230 lb (100 kg)	4.72	Oct 25, 2009
Justin Tukes; TE	Recruit ratings: Scout: Rivals: (45)					
Dalton Wertz; DT	Arcadia, FL	De Soto	6 ft 1 in (1.85 m)	285 lb (129 kg)	N/A	Jun 21, 2010
Dalton Wertz; DT	Recruit ratings: Scout: Rivals: (75)					
Rayshon Williams; WR	Denver, CO	Mullen	6 ft 1 in (1.85 m)	190 lb (86 kg)	4.5	Feb 3, 2011
Rayshon Williams; WR	Recruit ratings: Scout: Rivals: (78)					
Leilon Willingham; LB	Denver, CO	Mullen	6 ft 2 in (1.88 m)	240 lb (110 kg)	4.6	Feb 3, 2011
Leilon Willingham; LB	Recruit ratings: Scout: Rivals: (78)					
Overall recruit ranking: Scout: 57 Rivals: 39
‡ Refers to 40-yard dash; Note: In many cases, Scout, Rivals, 247Sports, On3, and ESPN may conflict in their listings of height, weight and 40 time.; In these cases, the average was taken. ESPN grades are on a 100-point scale.; Sources: "UCF 2011 Football Commitments". Rivals.; "2011 UCF Football Commits". Scout.; "ESPN". ESPN.; "Scout.com Team Recruiting Rankings". Scout.; "2011 Team Ranking". Rivals.com.

== Schedule ==
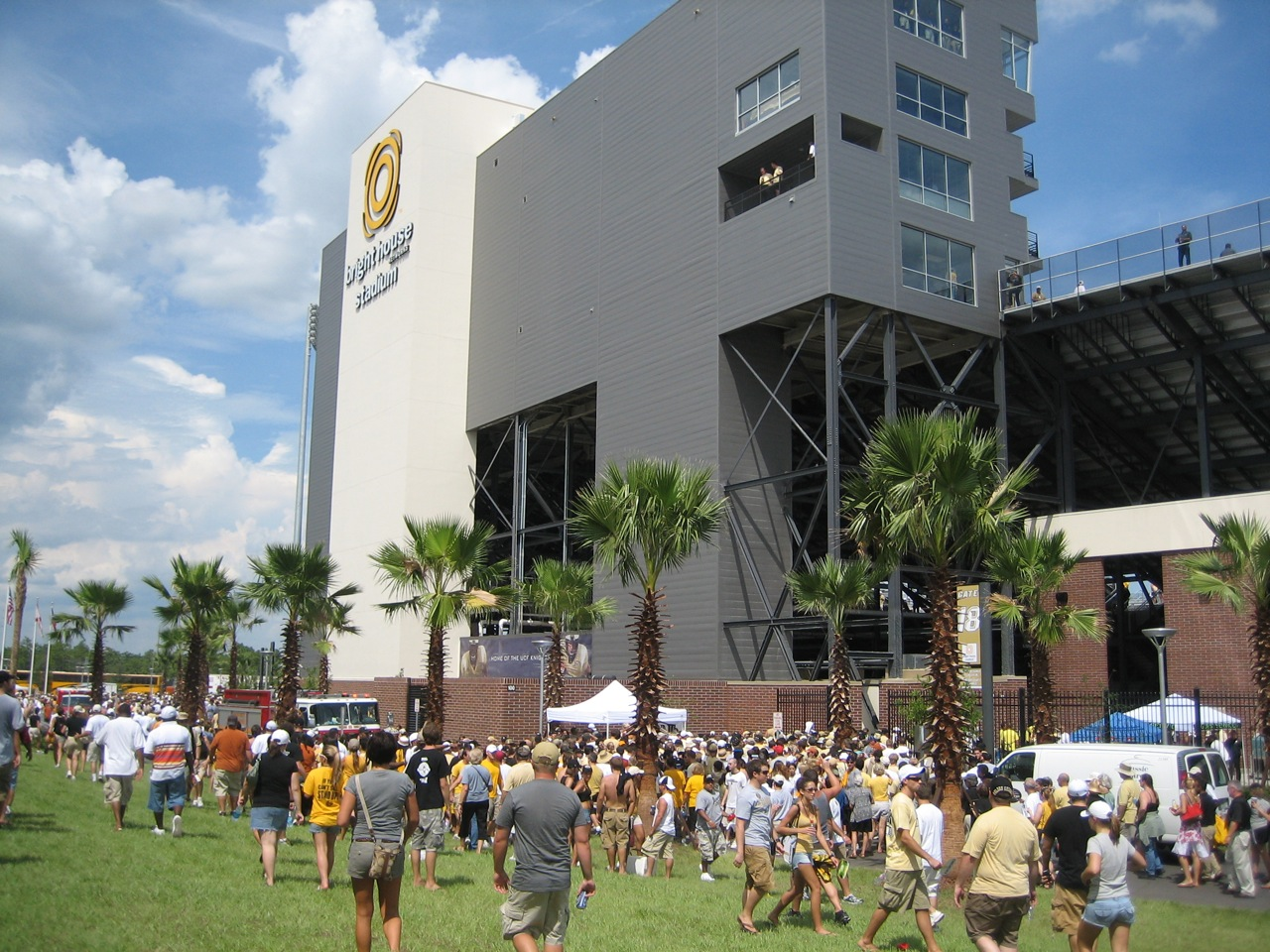
Bright House Networks Stadium, the Knights home field.

Date	Time	Opponent	Site	TV	Result	Attendance
September 3	7:00 pm	Charleston Southern (FCS)*	Bright House Networks Stadium; Orlando, FL	BHSN	W 62–0	39,752
September 10	8:00 pm	Boston College*	Bright House Networks Stadium; Orlando, FL	CBSSN	W 30–3	45,671
September 17	6:00 pm	at FIU*	FIU Stadium; Miami, FL	ESPN3	L 10–17	20,205
September 23	8:00 pm	at BYU*	LaVell Edwards Stadium; Provo, UT	ESPN	L 17–24	59,874
October 8	7:00 pm	Marshall	Bright House Networks Stadium; Orlando, FL	BHSN	W 16–6	24,750
October 15	3:30 pm	at SMU	Gerald J. Ford Stadium; Dallas, TX	FSN	L 17–38	22,932
October 20	8:00 pm	at UAB	Legion Field; Birmingham, AL	CSS	L 24–26	8,872
October 29	4:00 pm	Memphis^{†}	Bright House Networks Stadium; Orlando, FL	BHSN	W 41–0	37,683
November 3	8:00 pm	Tulsa	Bright House Networks Stadium; Orlando, FL	CBSSN	L 17–24	36,712
November 12	8:00 pm	at No. 25 Southern Miss	M.M. Roberts Stadium; Hattiesburg, MS	CBSSN	L 29–30	32,925
November 19	7:00 pm	at East Carolina	Dowdy–Ficklen Stadium; Greenville, NC	FSN	L 31–38	50,277
November 25	7:00 pm	UTEP	Bright House Networks Stadium; Orlando, FL	CBSSN	W 31–14	21,127
*Non-conference game; ^{†}Homecoming; Rankings from AP Poll released prior to the game; All times are in Eastern time

== Game summaries ==
=== Charleston Southern ===
Team	1	2	3	4	Total
Buccaneers	0	0	0	0	0
• Knights	14	21	14	13	62

- Location: Orlando, FL
- Game start: 7:04 pm
- Elapsed time: 2:46
- Game attendance: 39,752
- Game weather: 84 °F (29 °C), partly cloudy
- Referee: Steve LaMantia

2011 marked the fourth straight year that UCF opened the season against an FCS opponent, and the sixth straight opening win for the Knights.

The offense, led by sophomore quarterback Jeff Godfrey, got out to fast start against the Buccaneers, scoring on their first five possessions, including a 7-yard touchdown run by Godfrey 2:31 into the game. From there the Knights never surrendered the lead, only turning the ball over once on a fumble by Josh Robinson during a punt return. Godfrey rushed 46 yards for three touchdowns, and went 6-for-10 for 100-yards. Back-up quarterback Blake Bortles went 8-for-10 for 144 yards. Ronnie Weaver rushed for 107 yards on 8 carries for one touchdown, and Joshua Reese caught 4 passes for 97 yards.

UCF set a program record with eight rushing touchdowns, while the Knights had 560 yards of total offense, 244 by air and 316 rushing. The 62–0 score marked the second-largest shutout in school history and the third-most total points since UCF joined the FBS in 1996. The game also marked the Knights' first shutout since a 49–0 game against Tulane in 2009.

=== Boston College ===
Team	1	2	3	4	Total
Eagles	3	0	0	0	3
• Knights	3	6	0	21	30

- Location: Orlando, FL
- Game start: 8:04 pm
- Elapsed time: 2:54
- Game attendance: 45,671
- Game weather: 81 °F (27 °C), cloudy
- Referee: Brad Allen

The victory marks UCF's first ever home win against a BCS Automatic-Qualifying opponent, and only their fourth win over an AQ team in program history. The game marked the second meeting between the two schools, with the Eagles winning the first contest 7–34 in 2008.

The Knights defense held strong, only allowing a field goal to the Eagles on their first drive with 7:52 left in the first quarter. From that point on, UCF held the game firmly in its grasp, scoring three field goals and three touchdowns. Jeff Godfrey went 20-for-25 for 187-yards, and rushed for 69 yards for two touchdowns. Latavius Murray rushed for 72 yards on 10 carries for one touchdown, and A.J. Guyton caught 5 passes for 45 yards. The Knights caught two interceptions thrown by the Eagles in the fourth quarter, both resulting in a touchdown. UCF had 422 total yards of offense, with 235-yards rushing and 187-yards passing.

Dating back to last year, UCF has won six-straight games and 11 of its last 12, and hasn't allowed a touchdown in 12–straight quarters. With the win, the Knights move to 2–0 for the first time since 1998.

=== FIU ===
Team	1	2	3	4	Total
Knights	0	7	0	3	10
• Golden Panthers	0	7	10	0	17

- Location: Miami, FL
- Game start: 6:03 pm
- Elapsed time: 3:05
- Game attendance: 20,205
- Game weather: 85 °F (29 °C), Partly Cloudy
- Referee: Tony Backert

This game marked the first meeting between the two programs, and the first of a four-game series. The loss was UCF's first in seven games, and snapped the Knights' defensive record of 14 straight quarters without allowing a touchdown. UCF turned the ball over twice, on a fumble by Jeff Godfrey and muffed punt by Josh Robinson, with both turnovers resulting in touchdowns by the Golden Panthers.

Jeff Godfrey went 17-for-27 for 181-yards, and rushed for 65-yards for a touchdown. All three of the Knights running backs saw play, with Ronnie Weaver rushing for 34-yards on 9 carries, Brynn Harvey rushing for 31-yards on 6 carries and Latavius Murray rushing for 13-yards on 6 carries. Quincy McDuffie caught 6 passes for 70-yards, and Adam Nissley hauled in 4 passes for 53-yards. Nick Cattoi was one-for-two kicking, making a 31-yard field goal but missing a 51-yard attempt.

The Knights outgained FIU 266-yards to 204, but were flagged for nine penalties for 56-yards. After allowing just one sack in their first two games, UCF surrendered six against the Golden Panthers. The highlight of the night for UCF was an 18-play, 94-yard, 10-minute possession that led to the Knights only touchdown of the game in the second quarter.

=== BYU ===
Team	1	2	3	4	Total
Knights	10	0	7	0	17
• Cougars	3	0	14	7	24

- Location: Provo, UT
- Game start: 6:06 pm
- Elapsed time: 3:10
- Game attendance: 59,874
- Game weather: 81 °F (27 °C), Sunny
- Referee: Wayne Winkler

This matchup marked the first game between the two programs, with BYU making a return trip to Orlando in 2014. For the second straight game UCF lost the turnover battle, turning the ball over three times, on a fumble by Dontravius Floyd, a muffed punt by J.J. Worton and an interception, with two turnovers resulting in touchdowns by the Cougars.

Jeff Godfrey went 17-for-25 for 272-yards, his third career 200-yard game, and rushed for two touchdowns. Ronnie Weaver rushed for 38 yards on 7 carries and Latavius Murray rushing for 31-yards on 12 carries. AJ Guyton was the big playmaker of the night for UCF, with 9 receptions for 163-yards, while Quincy McDuffie caught 5 passes for 50-yards. The Knights special teams woes continued, as Nick Cattoi was one-for-two kicking, making a 34-yard field goal but missing a 35-yard attempt, and as UCF allowed BYU's first kickoff return for a touchdown since 1998.

The Knights outgained BYU 399-yards to 260, but were inefficient on the ground with 34 carries resulting in only 81 yards. UCF suffered a scare in the second half when sophomore Jeff Godfrey went down with an apparent injury. Back-up quarterback Blake Bortles entered the game, resurrecting a drive deep in Knights territory and going 4-for-5 for 46-yards. The loss snapped a 5-game winning streak by UCF on ESPN, and marked the first time since 2008 that the Knights dropped two games in a row.

=== Marshall ===
Team	1	2	3	4	Total
Thundering Herd	0	0	6	0	6
• Knights	14	2	0	0	16

- Location: Orlando, FL
- Game start: 7:04 pm
- Elapsed time: 2:47
- Game attendance: 24,750
- Game weather: 68 °F (20 °C), Rain
- Referee: Steve Barth

UCF has now won 7-straight games against the Thundering Herd, never losing to them since both teams entered Conference USA in 2005. In a game that was marred by rain, the Knights possessed the ball for over 40 minutes while the Thundering Herd held the ball for under 20. Jeff Godfrey rushed for 15 yards, and went 13-for-22 for 147 yards. Brynn Harvey rushed for 180-yards on 30 carries for one touchdown, and Joshua Reese caught 4 passes for 42-yards.

UCF's defense continues to shine, allowing only 130-yards and no offensive scores. The Knights are the only team in the country that has not allowed a passing touchdown this season. UCF also earned its first safety since an October 2008 game against Tulsa.

The win marked George O'Leary's 100th career victory. Since joining C-USA, UCF is 4–3 in conference openers, opening the season with wins in 2005, 2007 and 2010, all years the Knights went on to play in the conference championship game.

=== SMU ===
Team	1	2	3	4	Total
Knights	0	3	0	14	17
• Mustangs	10	7	7	14	38

- Location: Dallas, TX
- Game start: 3:40 pm
- Elapsed time: 3:12
- Game attendance: 22,932
- Game weather: 85 °F (29 °C), Sunny
- Referee: Jerry Banks

In a game that was a rematch of the 2010 Conference USA Championship Game, the Mustangs dominated the Knights both offensively and defensively. SMU proved difficult to stop in the air, with UCF allowing 358 passing yards, and 440-yards of total offense.

The Knights dominated the time of possession, with over 37 minutes, but only scored 3 times. Jeff Godfrey went 23-for-32 for 231-yards for a touchdown, and rushed for 46-yards on 12 carries. Brynn Harvey rushed for 66-yards on 21 carries, and Joshua Reese caught 5 passes for 74-yards. Back-up quarterback Blake Bortles entered the game for the Knights in the 4th quarter, leading the team on a quick scoring drive and going 9-for-12 for 118-yards and a touchdown.

=== UAB ===
Team	1	2	3	4	Total
Knights	14	0	0	10	24
• Blazers	7	9	0	10	26

- Location: Birmingham, AL
- Game start: 7:00 pm
- Elapsed time: 3:04
- Game attendance: 8,872
- Game weather: 56 °F (13 °C), Clear
- Referee: Randy Smith

UCF suffered another devastating loss against an 0–6 Blazers team in Birmingham. The Knights woes continued on both the offensive and defensive fronts, as UCF lost the battle for the time of possession for the first time this season, and allowed UAB 501 yards and 27 first downs. The Knights scored early but surrendered the lead before halftime. Back-up quarterback Blake Bortles entered the game for the Knights in the 4th quarter, leading the team on a 10–0 run. With 21 seconds left, UAB kicker Ty Long struck a 40-yard field goal giving the Blazers a 26–24 lead, and sealing their first win of the season.

Godfrey went 13-for-22 for 133-yards and Blake Bortles went 6-for-10 for 102-yards. Brynn Harvery rushed for 74-yards on 17 carries for two touchdowns. Joshua Reese was the big playmaker of the night for UCF, with 4 receptions for 41-yards, while Quincy McDuffie caught 2 passes for 39-yards. Running back Ronnie Weaver also had one 53-yard reception. After the game, debate arose once again over the fate of the Knight's starting quarterback job.

=== Memphis ===
Team	1	2	3	4	Total
Tigers	0	0	0	0	0
• Knights	14	7	10	10	41

- Location: Orlando, FL
- Game start: 4:04 pm
- Elapsed time: 3:04
- Game attendance: 37,683
- Game weather: 73 °F (23 °C), Cloudy
- Referee: Steve LaMantia

After losing four of their last five, the Knights proved victorious on homecoming. UCF is now 22–10 all time on Homecoming weekend and 23–8 (16–4) at home. This was the Knights third straight homecoming win, dating back to a 2009 rout of the then-ranked No. 12 Houston Cougars.

Jeff Godfrey went 14-for-17 for 200-yards for one touchdown. Godfrey also rushed 97-yards on 10 carries for a touchdown. Brynn Harvey rushed for 78 yards on 17 carries and Ronnie Weaver ran for 41-yards on 10 carries, both for a touchdown. Joshua Reese had 4 receptions for 70-yards, while Quincy McDuffie caught 3 passes for 49-yards and rushed for 29-yards, getting his first career rushing touchdown.

UCF dominated the Tigers on both sides of the ball, firmly controlling the clock, gaining 505-yards on 40 minutes of possession, and only allowing Memphis 134-yards. UCF ranks second in the country behind Texas, averaging 34:51 in time of possession. Twice this season the Knights have held the ball for over 40 minutes, against Marshall (40:14) and Memphis (40:03). The Knights lead Conference USA in total defense, and the Knights ranks in the top-10 nationally in rushing, passing, passing efficiency, total and scoring defense.

=== Tulsa ===
Team	1	2	3	4	Total
• Golden Hurricane	7	6	3	8	24
Knights	7	7	0	3	17

- Location: Orlando, FL
- Game start: 8:04 pm
- Elapsed time: 3:07
- Game attendance: 36,712
- Game weather: 71 °F (22 °C), clear
- Referee: Wayne Winkler

UCF's defense continued to struggle, allowing Tulsa 251 rushing yards, after averaging only 84.5 yards allowed during the previous eight games. The Golden Hurricane also scored the first offensive touchdown against the Knights at home since December 4, 2010, a full 334 days.

Jeff Godfrey went 16-for-23 for 226 yards, his fifth career 200-yard game, for one touchdown. Godfrey also rushed 46 yards on 14 carries. Brynn Harvey rushed for 26 yards on 7 carries and Ronnie Weaver had 9 carries for 36 yards for a touchdown. The Knights had two big receivers for the night: J. J. Worton had 4 receptions for 87 yards, while Quincy McDuffie caught 4 passes for 81 yards. Rannell Hall returned five kicks for 148 yards, and Shawn Moffit was 1-for-2 on field goals, making a 29-yard kick in the fourth quarter.

With the loss, the fifth of the season for the Knights, UCF no longer controlled its own destiny in conference play, matched its loss total from 2009, and had to win two of its last three games to become bowl-eligible for the third-straight year.

=== Southern Miss ===
Team	1	2	3	4	Total
Knights	3	3	3	20	29
• #23 Golden Eagles	7	6	3	14	30

- Location: Hattiesburg, MS
- Game start: 8:02 pm
- Elapsed time: 3:42
- Game attendance: 32,925
- Game weather: 68 °F (20 °C), clear
- Referee: Steve Barth

The Knights woes continued as they dropped their second straight match. UCF trailed by seven entering the fourth quarter, when back-up quarterback Blake Bortles entered the game for the Knights, leading the team on a 14-point scoring run. As time expired, Bortles threw a 25-yard touchdown pass to freshman wideout J.J. Worton. With the Knights down one, the team decided to go for the win with a two-point conversion but fell short.

Godfrey went 7-for-10 for 68-yards and Blake Bortles went 24-for-34 for 248 yards. Latavius Murray rushed for 19 yards on 4 carries and Ronnie Weaver had 11 carries for 12 yards. J.J. Worton was the big playmaker of the night for UCF, with 11 receptions for 114 yards, while A.J. Guyton caught 4 passes for 58 yards. After the Knights failed two-point conversion, debate arose again over the fate of the Knight's starting quarterback job and head coach George O'Leary.

=== East Carolina ===
Team	1	2	3	4	Total
Knights	7	10	7	7	31
• Pirates	10	7	7	14	38

- Location: Greenville, NC
- Game start: 7:10 pm
- Elapsed time: 3:27
- Game attendance: 50,277
- Game weather: 59 °F (15 °C), mostly clear
- Referee: Randy Smith

In a devastating loss that ended the Knights quest for a bowl game, East Carolina out-passed, out-rushed and most importantly out-scored the Knights.

Jeff Godfrey went 9-for-13 for 100 yards and a touchdown. Godfrey also rushed 17-yards on 14 carries. Blake Bortles was 9-for-17 for 98 yards for two touchdowns. Latavius Murray rushed for one touchdown and finished the game with 87 yards on 21 carries. The Knights had two big receivers for the night, Quincy McDuffie had 9 receptions for 93 yards, while Joshua Reese caught 4 passes for 51 yards. Rannell Hall returned five kicks for 184 yards, J.J. Worton had one kickoff return for 37 yards and Nick Cattoi was 1-for-2 on field goals, making a 39-yard kick in the second quarter.

=== UTEP ===
Team	1	2	3	4	Total
Miners	0	0	0	14	14
• Knights	7	17	7	0	31

- Location: Orlando, FL
- Game start: 7:03 pm
- Elapsed time: 3:08
- Game attendance: 21,127
- Game weather: 68 °F (20 °C), mostly cloudy
- Referee: Ed Ardito

In the Knights season finale, the team amassed 406 yards of total offense, 211 in the air and 249 on the ground. Even though UCF's second-year starter Jeff Godfrey began the game, second-string quarterback Blake Bortles entered the game early and remained the Knights' signal caller until the end of the contest. This would mark Godfrey's last game with the Knights, as he announced he would transfer following the season.

In his short playing time, Godfrey went 5-for-6 for 53-yards and Blake Bortles went 9-for-12 for 158-yards. Bortles also rushed for 16-yards on 7 attempts. Latavius Murray rushed for 233 yards on 21 carries for two touchdowns. The Knights receiving core was active, with five different receivers getting over 20-yards. J.J. Worton had 48 yards, Joshua Reese had 43, A.J. Guyton finished the game with 29, running back Ronnie Weaver had 25 receiving yards and Latavius Murray had 2 receptions for 24 yards.
