= 2011 Armed Forces Bowl =

American college football game

2011 Bell Helicopter Armed Forces Bowl
BYU Cougars	Tulsa Golden Hurricane
(9–3)	(8–4)
Independent	C-USA
24	21
Head coach: Bronco Mendenhall	Head coach: Bill Blankenship
	1	2	3	4	Total
BYU	3	7	7	7	24
Tulsa	7	7	0	7	21
- Date: December 30, 2011
- Season: 2011
- Stadium: Gerald J. Ford Stadium
- Location: University Park, Texas
- MVP: Cody Hoffman BYU WR (Offense); Dexter McCoil Tulsa DB (Defense)
- Favorite: Brigham Young by 2
- Referee: Shawn Smith (MAC)
- Attendance: 30,258
- Payout: US$750,000 per team

United States TV coverage
- Network: ESPN
- Announcers: Dave Neal (Play-by-Play); Andre Ware (Analyst); Cara Capuano (Sidelines)
- Nielsen ratings: 1.43

The 2011 Bell Helicopter Armed Forces Bowl, the ninth edition of the game was a post-season American college football bowl game held on December 30, 2011, at Gerald J. Ford Stadium on the campus of SMU in University Park, Texas, as part of the 2011–12 NCAA Bowl season.

The game, telecasted at 11:00 a.m. CT on ESPN, featured Tulsa versus BYU. BYU won the game by a score of 24–21.

This was the second and final year that the bowl was held at Gerald J. Ford Stadium. In 2012, the bowl returned to Amon G. Carter Stadium on the campus of TCU after the completion of a renovation of the stadium.

== Scoring summary ==
Scoring summary

Quarter	Time	Drive			Team	Scoring information	Score	
Quarter	Time	Plays	Yards	TOP	Team	Scoring information	BYU	Tulsa
1	9:51	11	76	5:09	TUL	Ricky Johnson 8-yard touchdown reception from G. J. Kinne, Kevin Fitzpatrick kick good	0	7
1	0:17	6	26	3:16	BYU	35-yard field goal by Justin Sorensen	3	7
2	8:45	4	86	1:16	TUL	Clay Sears 14-yard touchdown reception from Kinne, Fitzpatrick kick good	3	14
2	0:12	1	17	0:13	BYU	Cody Hoffman 17-yard touchdown reception from Riley Nelson, Sorensen kick good	10	14
3	1:41	9	71	3:47	BYU	Hoffman 30-yard touchdown reception from Nelson, Sorensen kick good	17	14
4	10:42	9	58	2:14	TUL	Bryan Burnham 30-yard touchdown reception from Kinne, Fitzpatrick kick good	17	21
4	0:11	12	48	4:07	BYU	Hoffman 2-yard touchdown reception from Nelson, Sorensen kick good	24	21
"TOP" = time of possession. For other American football terms, see Glossary of American football.							24	21
