= Gansz Trophy =

American college football rivalry

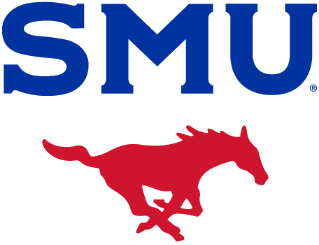
- Navy Midshipmen SMU Mustangs
- Sport: Football
- First meeting: November 15, 1930; SMU, 20–7
- Latest meeting: November 25, 2023; SMU, 59–14

Statistics
- Total meetings: 25
- All-time series: Navy leads, 13–12
- Largest victory: Navy, 55–14 (2014); SMU, 59–14 (2023)
- Longest win streak: Navy, 8 (2002–2017)
- Current win streak: SMU, 4 (2020–present)

Locations of Navy and SMU

The Gansz Trophy is awarded to the winner of the United States Naval Academy and Southern Methodist University rivalry football game. It was created in 2009 through a collaboration between the two athletic departments. The trophy is named for Frank Gansz who played linebacker at the Naval Academy from 1957 through 1959. Gansz later served as the head coach of the Kansas City Chiefs and on the coaching staffs at Navy and SMU.

== Game results ==
Navy victories	SMU victories

No.	Date	Location	Winner	Score
1	November 15, 1930	Baltimore, MD	SMU	20–7
2	November 28, 1931	Dallas, TX	SMU	13–6
3	October 3, 1959	Dallas, TX	SMU	20–7
4	October 8, 1960	Norfolk, VA	#6 Navy	26–7
5	October 11, 1963	Dallas, TX	SMU	32–28
6	September 24, 1966	Dallas, TX	SMU	21–3
7	November 20, 1993	Annapolis, MD	SMU	43–13
8	September 9, 1995	Dallas, TX	Navy	33–2
9	September 21, 1996	Annapolis, MD	Navy	19–17
10	September 20, 1997	Dallas, TX	Navy	46–16
11	November 21, 1998	Annapolis, MD	SMU	24–11
12	August 31, 2002	Dallas, TX	Navy	38–7
13	October 24, 2008	Annapolis, MD	Navy	34–7

No.	Date	Location	Winner	Score
14	October 17, 2009	Dallas, TX	Navy	38–35
15	October 16, 2010	Annapolis, MD	Navy	28–21
16	November 12, 2011	Dallas, TX	Navy	24–17
17	November 14, 2015	Annapolis, MD	#20 Navy	55–14
18	November 26, 2016	Dallas, TX	Navy	75–31
19	November 11, 2017	Annapolis, MD	Navy	43–40
20	September 22, 2018	Dallas, TX	SMU	31–30
21	November 23, 2019	Annapolis, MD	Navy	35–28
22	October 31, 2020	Dallas, TX	#22 SMU	51–37
23	October 9, 2021	Annapolis, MD	#24 SMU	31–24
24	October 14, 2022	Dallas, TX	SMU	40–34
25	November 25, 2023	Dallas, TX	SMU	59–14
Series: Navy leads 13–12

== See also ==
- List of NCAA college football rivalry games
