= 2011 Big Ten Conference football season =

- League: NCAA Division I FBS
- Sport: Football
- Duration: September 3, 2011 through January 2012
- Teams: 12
- TV partner(s): ABC, ESPN Inc., Big Ten Network, FOX (championship game)

2012 NFL Draft
- Top draft pick: Riley Reiff (Iowa)
- Picked by: Detroit Lions, 23rd overall

Regular Season
- Season MVP: Montee Ball
- Top scorer: Montee Ball
- Leaders Division champions: Wisconsin Badgers and Penn State Nittany Lions
- Legends Division champions: Michigan State Spartans
- Legends Division runners-up: Michigan Wolverines

Championship Game
- Champions: Wisconsin Badgers
- Runners-up: Michigan State
- Finals MVP: Russell Wilson

Football seasons
- 2010 2012

2011 Big Ten Conference football standings
	Conf.			Overall
Team	W		L	W		L
Legends Division
No. 11 Michigan State x	7	–	1	11	–	3
No. 12 Michigan %	6	–	2	11	–	2
No. 24 Nebraska	5	–	3	9	–	4
Iowa	4	–	4	7	–	6
Northwestern	3	–	5	6	–	7
Minnesota	2	–	6	3	–	9
Leaders Division
No. 10 Wisconsin xy$	6	–	2	11	–	3
Penn State x	6	–	2	9	–	4
Purdue	4	–	4	7	–	6
Ohio State	3	–	5	6	–	7
Illinois	2	–	6	7	–	6
Indiana	0	–	8	1	–	11
Championship: Wisconsin 42, Michigan State 39
$ – BCS representative as conference champion; % – BCS at-large representative; x – Division champion/co-champions; y – Championship game participant; Rankings from AP Poll

The 2011 Big Ten Conference football season is the 116th for the Big Ten. The conference started its season on Saturday, September 3, as each of the conference's teams began their respective 2011 season of NCAA Division I FBS (Football Bowl Subdivision) competition. This season is Nebraska's first season as a member of the Big Ten, and also marks the creation of conference divisions (named Leaders and Legends), and a championship game. The season was also notable for the Penn State child sex abuse scandal.

For the season, Leaders Division champion Wisconsin finished as conference champion by defeating Legends Division champion Michigan State in the 2011 Big Ten Football Championship Game. Penn State was Leaders Division co-Champion, while Legends Division runner-up Michigan finished with the conference's best record. The conference earned two BCS bowl invitations and compiled a 4–6 overall record in 2011–12 NCAA football bowl games.

The Conference had six 2011 College Football All-America Team consensus selections: Montee Ball, Kevin Zeitler, David Molk, Whitney Mercilus (unanimous), Devon Still, and Jerel Worthy, with the Rimington Trophy going to Molk and the Ted Hendricks Award going to Mercilus. Ball won the Chicago Tribune Silver Football and the conference's players won four national statistical championships: Russell Wilson (passing efficiency), Raheem Mostert (kickoff return average), Ball (scoring), and Mercilus (quarterback sacks).

Following the season the conference contributed 41 to the 2012 NFL draft, including 4 in the first round: Riley Reiff (23rd), Mercilus (26th), Zeitler (27th), and A. J. Jenkins (30th).

== Rankings ==
		Pre	Wk 1	Wk 2	Wk 3	Wk 4	Wk 5	Wk 6	Wk 7	Wk 8	Wk 9	Wk 10	Wk 11	Wk 12	Wk 13	Wk 14	Final
Illinois	AP				24	24	19	16	23	RV							
Illinois	C				RV	22	16	15	21	RV							
Illinois	Harris	Not released						14	20	RV	RV						
Illinois	BCS	Not released							23								
Indiana	AP																
Indiana	C																
Indiana	Harris	Not released															
Indiana	BCS	Not released															
Iowa	AP	RV	RV														
Iowa	C	RV	RV				RV			RV							
Iowa	Harris	Not released								RV							
Iowa	BCS	Not released															
Michigan	AP	RV	RV	RV	22	19	12	11	18	17	13	22	20	17	17	13	12
Michigan	C	RV	RV	RV	21	19	11	10	17	17	13	21	18	16	16	12	9
Michigan	Harris	Not released						10	17	16	13	21	18	16	16	12	
Michigan	BCS	Not released							18	18	15	24	18	15	16	13	
Michigan State	AP	17	17	15	RV	RV	RV	23	15	9	15	13	12	11	11	12	11
Michigan State	C	17	16	15	23	25	20	19	13	10	16	13	12	10	9	13	10
Michigan State	Harris	Not released						22	15	11	17	13	12	11	11	13	
Michigan State	BCS	Not released							16	11	17	17	15	14	11	17	
Minnesota	AP																
Minnesota	C																
Minnesota	Harris	Not released															
Minnesota	BCS	Not released															
Nebraska	AP	10	10	10	9	8	14	14	13	13	9	18	16	22	20	21	24
Nebraska	C	11	10	10	9	8	15	14	11	13	9	17	16	22	19	20	24
Nebraska	Harris	Not released						13	11	13	9	17	16	21	19	20	
Nebraska	BCS	Not released							13	14	10	19	16	21	20	20	
Northwestern	AP	RV	RV	RV													
Northwestern	C	RV	RV	RV	RV	RV											
Northwestern	Harris	Not released															
Northwestern	BCS	Not released															
Ohio State	AP	18	15	17	RV	RV					RV						
Ohio State	C	16	15	16	RV	RV	RV				RV						
Ohio State	Harris	Not released									RV						
Ohio State	BCS	Not released															
Penn State	AP	RV	23	RV	RV	RV	RV	RV	RV	21	16	12	21	20	23	24	RV
Penn State	C	25	20	RV	RV	RV	RV	25	22	19	15	12	21	19	22	23	RV
Penn State	Harris	Not released						RV	24	19	16	12	19	18	22	23	
Penn State	BCS	Not released							21	19	16	12	21	19	23	22	
Purdue	AP																
Purdue	C																
Purdue	Harris	Not released															
Purdue	BCS	Not released															
Wisconsin	AP	11	8	7	6	7	4	4	4	12	19	16	15	15	15	9	10
Wisconsin	C	10	9	8	7	7	5	4	4	11	17	14	13	12	12	8	11
Wisconsin	Harris	Not released						4	4	12	18	14	13	14	13	8	
Wisconsin	BCS	Not released							6	15	20	18	17	16	12	10	

Legend
	Improvement in ranking
	Drop in ranking
	Not ranked previous week
	No change in ranking from previous week
RV	Received votes but were not ranked in Top 25 of poll

== Spring games ==
April 9

- Purdue Boilermakers

April 16

- Indiana Hoosiers
- Iowa Hawkeyes
- Michigan Wolverines
- Nebraska Cornhuskers
- Northwestern Wildcats
- Penn State Nittany Lions

April 23

- Illinois Fighting Illini
- Minnesota Golden Gophers
- Ohio State Buckeyes
- Wisconsin Badgers

April 30

- Michigan State Spartans

== Regular season ==
Index to colors and formatting
Big Ten member won
Big Ten member lost
Big Ten teams in **bold**

All times Eastern time.

Rankings reflect that of the AP poll.

=== Week 1 ===
Date	Time	Visiting team	Home team	Site	TV	Result	Attendance	Ref.
September 1	8:00 p.m.	UNLV	No. 11 **Wisconsin**	Camp Randall Stadium • Madison, WI	ESPN	**W** 51–17	77,085	
September 2	7:30 p.m.	Youngstown State	No. 17 **Michigan State**	Spartan Stadium • East Lansing, MI	BTN	**W** 28–6	75,910	
September 3	12:00 p.m.	**Northwestern**	Boston College	Alumni Stadium • Chestnut Hill, MA	ESPNU	**W** 24–17	37,561	
September 3	12:00 p.m.	Akron	No. 18 **Ohio State**	Ohio Stadium • Columbus, OH	ESPN	**W** 42–0	105,001	
September 3	12:00 p.m.	Indiana State	**Penn State**	Beaver Stadium • University Park, PA	BTN	**W** 41–7	96,461	
September 3	12:00 p.m.	Tennessee Tech	**Iowa**	Kinnick Stadium • Iowa City, IA	BTN	**W** 34–7	70,585	
September 3	12:00 p.m.	Middle Tennessee State	**Purdue**	Ross–Ade Stadium • West Lafayette, IN	BTN	**W** 27–24	42,110	
September 3	3:30 p.m.	**Minnesota**	No. 25 USC	Los Angeles Coliseum • Los Angeles, CA	ABC / ESPN2	**L** 19–17	68,273	
September 3	3:30 p.m.	Western Michigan	**Michigan**	Michigan Stadium • Ann Arbor, MI	ABC / ESPN2	**W** 34–10	110,506	
September 3	3:30 p.m.	Chattanooga	No. 10 **Nebraska**	Memorial Stadium • Ann Arbor, MI	BTN	**W** 40–7	84,883	
September 3	3:30 p.m.	Arkansas State	**Illinois**	Memorial Stadium • Champaign, IL	BTN	**W** 33–15	45,154	
September 3	6:00 p.m.	**Indiana**	Ball State	Lucas Oil Stadium • Indianapolis, IN	BTN	**L** 27–20	40,224	
^{#}Rankings from AP Poll released prior to game. All times are in Eastern Time.

=== Week 2 ===
Date	Time	Visiting team	Home team	Site	TV	Result	Attendance	Ref.
September 10	12:00 p.m.	**Iowa**	Iowa State	Jack Trice Stadium • Ames, IA (Cy-Hawk Series)	FSN	**L** 44–41 ^{3OT}	56,085	
September 10	12:00 p.m.	Florida Atlantic	No. 17 **Michigan State**	Spartan Stadium • East Lansing, MI	ESPN2	**W** 44–0	70,249	
September 10	12:00 p.m.	Toledo	No. 15 **Ohio State**	Ohio Stadium • Columbus, OH	BTN	**W** 27–22	105,016	
September 10	12:00 p.m.	Oregon State	No. 8 **Wisconsin**	Camp Randall Stadium • Madison, WI	ESPN	**W** 35–0	80,337	
September 10	12:00 p.m.	South Dakota State	**Illinois**	Memorial Stadium • Champaign, IL	BTN	**W** 56–3	42,212	
September 10	3:30 p.m.	Eastern Illinois	**Northwestern**	Ryan Field (stadium) • Evanston, IL	BTN	**W** 42–21	28,042	
September 10	3:30 p.m.	New Mexico State	**Minnesota**	TCF Bank Stadium • Minneapolis, MN	BTN	**L** 28–21	48,807	
September 10	3:30 p.m.	No. 3 Alabama	No. 23 **Penn State**	Beaver Stadium • University Park, PA	ABC	**L** 27–11	107,846	
September 10	3:30 p.m.	**Purdue**	Rice	Rice Stadium • Houston, TX	CBS Sports Network	**L** 24–22	25,317	
September 10	7:00 p.m.	Virginia	**Indiana**	Memorial Stadium • Bloomington, IN	BTN	**L** 34–31	41,549	
September 10	7:00 p.m.	Fresno State	No. 10 **Nebraska**	Memorial Stadium • Lincoln, NE	BTN	**W** 42–29	85,101	
September 10	8:00 p.m.	Notre Dame	**Michigan**	Michigan Stadium • Ann Arbor, MI (Mich-ND rivalry)	ESPN	**W** 35–31	114,804	
^{#}Rankings from AP Poll released prior to game. All times are in Eastern Time.

=== Week 3 ===
Date	Time	Visiting team	Home team	Site	TV	Result	Attendance	Ref.
September 17	12:00 p.m.	Eastern Michigan	**Michigan**	Michigan Stadium • Ann Arbor, MI	BTN	**W** 31–3	110,343	
September 17	12:00 p.m.	**Penn State**	Temple	Lincoln Financial Field • Philadelphia, PA	ESPN	**W** 14–10	57,323	
September 17	12:00 p.m.	Pittsburgh	**Iowa**	Kinnick Stadium • Iowa City, IA	ESPN2	**W** 31–27	70,585	
September 17	12:00 p.m.	Southeast Missouri State	**Purdue**	Ross–Ade Stadium • West Lafayette, IN	BTN	**W** 59–0	46,116	
September 17	3:30 p.m.	South Carolina State	**Indiana**	Memorial Stadium • Bloomington, IN	BTN	**W** 38–21	41,203	
September 17	3:30 p.m.	No. 15 **Michigan State**	Notre Dame	Notre Dame Stadium • Notre Dame, IN (Megaphone Trophy)	NBC	**L** 31–13	80,795	
September 17	3:30 p.m.	Miami (OH)	**Minnesota**	TCF Bank Stadium • Minneapolis, MN	BTN	**W** 29–23	49,950	
September 17	3:30 p.m.	Washington	No. 11 **Nebraska**	Memorial Stadium • Lincoln, NE	ABC	**W** 51–38	85,110	
September 17	3:30 p.m.	**Northwestern**	Army	Michie Stadium • West Point, NY	CBS	**L** 21–14	35,784	
September 17	3:30 p.m.	No. 7 **Wisconsin**	Northern Illinois	Soldier Field • Chicago, IL	ESPN3	**W** 49–7	41,068	
September 17	3:30 p.m.	No. 22 Arizona State	**Illinois**	Memorial Stadium • Champaign, IL	BTN	**W** 17–14	50,669	
September 17	7:30 p.m.	No. 17 **Ohio State**	Miami (FL)	Sun Life Stadium • Miami, FL	ESPN	**L** 24–6	66,279	
^{#}Rankings from AP Poll released prior to game. All times are in Eastern Time.

=== Week 4 ===
Date	Time	Visiting team	Home team	Site	TV	Result	Attendance	Ref.
September 24	12:00 p.m.	Central Michigan	**Michigan State**	Spartan Stadium • East Lansing, MI	ESPNU	**W** 45–7	72,119	
September 24	12:00 p.m.	Eastern Michigan	**Penn State**	Beaver Stadium • University Park, PA	ESPN2	**W** 34–6	95,636	
September 24	12:00 p.m.	Louisiana-Monroe	**Iowa**	Kinnick Stadium • Iowa City, IA	BTN	**W** 45–17	70,585	
September 24	3:30 p.m.	Colorado	**Ohio State**	Ohio Stadium • Columbus, OH	ABC \ ESPN2	**W** 37–17	105,096	
September 24	3:30 p.m.	South Dakota	No. 6 **Wisconsin**	Camp Randall Stadium • Madison, WI	BTN	**W** 59–10	78,880	
September 24	3:30 p.m.	Western Michigan	No. 24 **Illinois**	Memorial Stadium • Champaign, IL	BTN	**W** 23–20	43,684	
September 24	7:00 p.m.	North Dakota State	**Minnesota**	TCF Bank Stadium • Minneapolis, MN	BTN	**L** 37–24	48,802	
September 24	7:00 p.m.	**Indiana**	North Texas	Memorial Stadium • Bloomington, IN	ESPN3	**L** 24–21	21,181	
September 24	7:30 p.m.	No. 9 **Nebraska**	Wyoming	War Memorial Stadium • Laramie, WY	NBC Sports Network	**W** 38–14	32,617	
^{#}Rankings from AP Poll released prior to game. All times are in Eastern Time.

Date	Bye Week	
September 24	Northwestern	Purdue

=== Week 5 ===
Date	Time	Visiting team	Home team	Site	TV	Result	Attendance	Ref.
October 1	12:00 p.m.	**Penn State**	**Indiana**	Memorial Stadium • Bloomington, IN	ESPNU	**PSU**16–10	42,621	
October 1	12:00 p.m.	**Minnesota**	No. 19 **Michigan**	Michigan Stadium • Ann Arbor, MI (Little Brown Jug)	BTN	**MICH** 58–0	111,106	
October 1†	12:00 p.m.	**Northwestern**	No. 24 **Illinois**	Memorial Stadium • Champaign, IL (Land of Lincoln Trophy)	BTN	**ILL** 38–35	53,243	
October 1	3:30 p.m.	**Michigan State**	**Ohio State**	Ohio Stadium • Columbus, OH	ABC / ESPN2	**MSU** 10–7	105,306	
October 1	8:00 p.m.	No. 8 **Nebraska**	No. 7 **Wisconsin**	Camp Randall Stadium • Madison, WI	ABC	**WIS** 48–17	81,384	
October 1	8:00 p.m.	Notre Dame	**Purdue**	Ross–Ade Stadium • West Lafayette, IN (Shillelagh Trophy)	ESPN	**L** 38–10	61,555	
^{#}Rankings from AP Poll released prior to game. All times are in Eastern Time.

Date	Bye Week
October 1	Iowa

=== Week 6 ===
Date	Time	Visiting team	Home team	Site	TV	Result	Attendance	Ref.
October 8	12:00 p.m.	**Minnesota**	**Purdue**	Ross–Ade Stadium • West Lafayette, IN	ESPN	**PUR** 45–17	38,207	
October 8	2:30 p.m.	No. 19 **Illinois**	**Indiana**	Memorial Stadium • Bloomington, IN	BTN	**ILL** 41–20	41,665	
October 8	3:30 p.m.	**Iowa**	**Penn State**	Beaver Stadium • University Park, PA	ABC / ESPN	**PSU** 13–3	103,497	
October 8	7:00 p.m.	No. 12 **Michigan**	**Northwestern**	Ryan Field • Evanston, IL	BTN	**MICH** 42–24	47,330	
October 8†	8:00 p.m.	**Ohio State**	No. 14 **Nebraska**	Memorial Stadium • Lincoln, NE	ABC	**NEB** 34–27	85,426	
^{#}Rankings from AP Poll released prior to game. All times are in Eastern Time.

Date	Bye Week	
October 8	Michigan State	#4 Wisconsin

=== Week 7 ===
Date	Time	Visiting team	Home team	Site	TV	Result	Attendance	Ref.
October 15	12:00 p.m.	No. 11 **Michigan**	No. 23 **Michigan State**	Spartan Stadium • East Lansing, MI (Paul Bunyan Trophy)	ESPN	**MSU** 28–14	77,515	
October 15†	12:00 p.m.	**Purdue**	**Penn State**	Beaver Stadium • University Park, PA	BTN	**PSU** 23–18	100,820	
October 15†	12:00 p.m.	**Indiana**	No. 4 **Wisconsin**	Camp Randall Stadium • Madison, WI	ESPN2	**WIS** 59–7	80,732	
October 15	3:30 p.m.	**Ohio State**	No. 16 **Illinois**	Memorial Stadium • Champaign, IL (Illibuck)	ABC / ESPN	**OSU** 17–7	55,229	
October 15	7:00 p.m.	**Northwestern**	**Iowa**	Kinnick Stadium • Iowa City, IA	BTN	**IOWA** 41–31	70,585	
^{#}Rankings from AP Poll released prior to game. All times are in Eastern Time.

Date	Bye Week	
October 15	Minnesota	#14 Nebraska

=== Week 8 ===
Date	Time	Visiting team	Home team	Site	TV	Result	Attendance	Ref.
October 22†	12:00 p.m.	**Indiana**	**Iowa**	Kinnick Stadium • Iowa City, IA	BTN	**IOWA** 45–24	70,585	
October 22†	12:00 p.m.	No. 23 **Illinois**	**Purdue**	Ross–Ade Stadium • West Lafayette, IN (Purdue Cannon)	ESPN2	**PUR** 21–14	45,146	
October 22†	3:30 p.m.	No. 13 **Nebraska**	**Minnesota**	TCF Bank Stadium • Minneapolis, MN	ABC / ESPN2	**NEB** 41–14	49,187	
October 22†	7:00 p.m.	No. 21 **Penn State**	**Northwestern**	Ryan Field • Evanston, IL	BTN	**PSU** 34–24	40,004	
October 22†	8:00 p.m.	No. 6 **Wisconsin**	No. 16 **Michigan State**	Spartan Stadium • East Lansing, MI	ESPN	**MSU** 37–31	76,405	
^{#}Rankings from AP Poll released prior to game. All times are in Eastern Time.

Date	Bye Week	
October 22	#18 Michigan	Ohio State

=== Week 9 ===
Date	Time	Visiting team	Home team	Site	TV	Result	Attendance	Ref.
October 29†	12:00 p.m.	**Northwestern**	**Indiana**	Memorial Stadium • Bloomington, IN	BTN	**NW** 59–38	39,239	
October 29†	12:00 p.m.	**Purdue**	No. 18 **Michigan**	Michigan Stadium • Ann Arbor, MI	ESPN2	**MICH** 36–14	112,115	
October 29	12:00 p.m.	No. 11 **Michigan State**	No. 14 **Nebraska**	Memorial Stadium • Lincoln, NE	ESPN	**NEB** 24–3	85,641	
October 29	3:30 p.m.	**Iowa**	**Minnesota**	TCF Bank Stadium • Minneapolis, MN (Floyd of Rosedale)	BTN	**MIN** 22–21	46,543	
October 29	3:30 p.m.	**Illinois**	No. 19 **Penn State**	Beaver Stadium • University Park, PA	ABC / ESPN2	**PSU** 10–7	97,828	
October 29†	8:00 p.m.	No. 15 **Wisconsin**	**Ohio State**	Ohio Stadium • Columbus, OH	ESPN	**OSU** 33–29	105,511	
^{#}Rankings from AP Poll released prior to game. All times are in Eastern Time.

=== Week 10 ===
Date	Time	Visiting team	Home team	Site	TV	Result	Attendance	Ref.
November 5	12:00 p.m.	**Minnesota**	No. 17 **Michigan State**	Spartan Stadium • East Lansing, MI	BTN	**MSU** 31–24	72,219	
November 5	12:00 p.m.	**Indiana**	**Ohio State**	Ohio Stadium • Columbus, OH	BTN	**OSU** 34–20	105,195	
November 5	12:00 p.m.	No. 15 **Michigan**	**Iowa**	Kinnick Stadium • Iowa City, IA	ESPN	**IOWA** 24–16	70,585	
November 5	3:30 p.m.	**Northwestern**	No. 10 **Nebraska**	Memorial Stadium • Lincoln, NE	BTN	**NW** 28–25	85,115	
November 5	3:30 p.m.	**Purdue**	No. 20 **Wisconsin**	Camp Randall Stadium • Madison, WI	BTN	**WIS** 62–17	80,566	
^{#}Rankings from AP Poll released prior to game. All times are in Eastern Time.

Date	Bye Week	
November 5	Illinois	#16 Penn State

=== Week 11 ===
Date	Time	Visiting team	Home team	Site	TV	Result	Attendance	Ref.
November 12	12:00 p.m.	Rice	**Northwestern**	Ryan Field • Evanston, IL	BTN	**W** 28–6	26,886	
November 12	12:00 p.m.	No. 19 **Nebraska**	No. 12 **Penn State**	Beaver Stadium • University Park, PA	ESPN	**NEB** 17–14	107,903	
November 12	12:00 p.m.	No. 17 **Michigan State**	**Iowa**	Kinnick Stadium • Iowa City, IA	ESPN2	**MSU** 37–21	70,585	
November 12	12:00 p.m.	**Ohio State**	**Purdue**	Ross–Ade Stadium • West Lafayette, IN	BTN	**PUR** 26–23	43,334	
November 12	3:30 p.m.	No. 18 **Wisconsin**	**Minnesota**	TCF Bank Stadium • Minneapolis, MN (Paul Bunyan's Axe)	BTN	**WIS** 42–13	49,158	
November 12	3:30 p.m.	No. 24 **Michigan**	**Illinois**	Memorial Stadium • Champaign, IL	ABC / ESPN	**MICH** 31–14	60,670	
^{#}Rankings from AP Poll released prior to game. All times are in Eastern Time.

Date	Bye Week
November 12	Indiana

=== Week 12 ===
Date	Time	Visiting team	Home team	Site	TV	Result	Attendance	Ref.
November 19	12:00 p.m.	**Minnesota**	**Northwestern**	Ryan Field • Evanston, IL	BTN	**NW** 28–13	26,215	
November 19	12:00 p.m.	**Indiana**	No. 15 **Michigan State**	Spartan Stadium • East Lansing, MI (Old Brass Spittoon)	BTN	**MSU** 55–3	74,128	
November 19	12:00 p.m.	No. 16 **Nebraska**	No. 18 **Michigan**	Michigan Stadium • Ann Arbor, MI	ESPN	**MICH** 45–17	113,718	
November 19	12:00 p.m.	No. 17 **Wisconsin**	**Illinois**	Memorial Stadium • Champaign, IL	ESPN2	**WIS** 28–17	45,519	
November 19	12:00 p.m.	**Iowa**	**Purdue**	Ross–Ade Stadium • West Lafayette, IN	BTN	**IOWA** 31–21	40,106	
November 19	3:30 p.m.	No. 21 **Penn State**	**Ohio State**	Ohio Stadium • Columbus, OH	ABC / ESPN	**PSU** 20–14	105,493	
^{#}Rankings from AP Poll released prior to game. All times are in Eastern Time.

=== Week 13 ===
Date	Time	Visiting team	Home team	Site	TV	Result	Attendance	Ref.
November 25	12:00 p.m.	**Iowa**	No. 21 **Nebraska**	Memorial Stadium • Lincoln, NE (Heroes Trophy)	ABC	**NEB** 20–7	85,595	
November 26	12:00 p.m.	No. 14 **Michigan State**	**Northwestern**	Ryan Field • Evanston, IL	BTN	**MSU** 31–17	32,172	
November 26	12:00 p.m.	**Ohio State**	No. 15 **Michigan**	Michigan Stadium • Ann Arbor, MI (The Game)	ABC	**MICH** 40–34	114,132	
November 26	3:30 p.m.	**Purdue**	**Indiana**	Memorial Stadium • Bloomington, IN (Old Oaken Bucket)	BTN	**PUR** 33–25	42,005	
November 26	3:30 p.m.	**Illinois**	**Minnesota**	TCF Bank Stadium • Minneapolis, MN	BTN	**MIN** 27–7	41,549	
November 26	3:30 p.m.	No. 19 **Penn State**	No. 16 **Wisconsin**	Camp Randall Stadium • Madison, WI	ESPN	**WIS** 45–7	79,708	
^{#}Rankings from AP Poll released prior to game. All times are in Eastern Time.

=== Big Ten Championship Game ===
Date	Time	Visiting team	Home team	Site	TV	Result	Attendance	Ref.
December 3	8:00 p.m.	No. 10 **Wisconsin**	No. 17 **Michigan State**	Lucas Oil Stadium • Indianapolis, IN (2011 Big Ten Championship)	FOX	**WIS** 42–39	64,152	
^{#}Rankings from AP Poll released prior to game. All times are in Eastern Time.

== Players of the week ==
Week	Offensive			Defensive			Special Teams			Freshman		
Week	Player	Position	Team	Player	Position	Team	Player	Position	Team	Player	Position	Team
Week 1	Russell Wilson	QB	WIS	Brandon Herron	LB	MICH	Brett Maher	P/PK	NEB	Houston Bates	LB	ILL
Week 1	Russell Wilson	QB	WIS	Brandon Herron	LB	MICH	Chaz Powell	KR	PSU	Houston Bates	LB	ILL
Week 2	Denard Robinson	QB	MICH	Mike Taylor	LB	WIS	Ameer Abdullah	KR	NEB	Ameer Abdullah	KR	NEB
Week 3	James Vandenberg	QB	IOWA	Jonathan Brown	LB	ILL	Duane Bennett	RB	MINN	D'Angelo Roberts	RB	IND
Week 4	Denard Robinson	QB	MICH	Tom Nardo	DT	IOWA	Derek Dimke	PK	ILL	Donovonn Young	RB	ILL
Week 4	Matt McGloin	QB	PSU	Tom Nardo	DT	IOWA	Derek Dimke	PK	ILL	Donovonn Young	RB	ILL
Week 5	A.J. Jenkins	WR	ILL	Mike Taylor	LB	WIS	Anthony Fera	PK/P	PSU	Marcus Rush	DE	MSU
Week 5	Russell Wilson	QB	WIS	Mike Taylor	LB	WIS	Anthony Fera	PK/P	PSU	Marcus Rush	DE	MSU
Week 6	Taylor Martinez	QB	NEB	Tavon Wilson	CB	ILL	Brett Maher	P/PK	NEB	Shayne Wynn	KR	IND
Week 7	Montee Ball	RB	WIS	John Simon	DT	OSU	Anthony Fera	P/PK	PSU	Mike Sadler	P	MSU
Week 8	Marvin McNutt	WR	IOWA	Gerald Hodges	LB	PSU	Kyler Elsworth	LB	MSU	Tre Roberson	QB	IND
Week 8	Kirk Cousins	QB	MSU	Kawann Short	DT	PUR	Kyler Elsworth	LB	MSU	Tre Roberson	QB	IND
Week 9	Drake Dunsmore	TE	NW	Gerald Hodges	LB	PSU	Jordan Wettstein	PK	MINN	Braxton Miller	QB	OSU
Week 10	Kain Colter	QB	NW	Chris Borland	LB	WIS	Mike Sadler	P	MSU	Raheem Mostert	KR	PUR
Week 10	Montee Ball	RB	WIS	Chris Borland	LB	WIS	Mike Sadler	P	MSU	Raheem Mostert	KR	PUR
Week 11	Russell Wilson	QB	WIS	Ryan Van Bergen	DE	MICH	Brett Maher	P/PK	NEB	Mike Sadler	P	MSU
Week 11	Russell Wilson	QB	WIS	Kawann Short	DT	PUR	Bruce Gaston	DT	PUR	Mike Sadler	P	MSU
Week 12	Denard Robinson	QB	MICH	Chris Borland	LB	WIS	Anthony Fera	P/PK	PSU	Ryan Shazier	LB	OSU
Week 12	Montee Ball	RB	WIS	Chris Borland	LB	WIS	Anthony Fera	P/PK	PSU	Ryan Shazier	LB	OSU
Week 13	Denard Robinson	QB	MICH	Kim Royston	DB	MINN	Carson Wiggs	PK	PUR	Braxton Miller	QB	OSU
Week 13	Montee Ball	RB	WIS	Lavonte David	LB	NEB	Carson Wiggs	PK	PUR	Braxton Miller	QB	OSU

== Attendance ==
Team	Stadium	Capacity	Game 1	Game 2	Game 3	Game 4	Game 5	Game 6	Game 7	Game 8	Total	Average	% of Capacity
Illinois	Memorial Stadium	60,670	45,154	42,212	50,669	43,684	53,243	55,229	60,670	54,633	405,494	50,687	83.5%
Indiana	Memorial Stadium	52,929	41,549	41,203	42,621	41,665	39,239	42,005	—	—	248,282	41,380	78.2%
Iowa	Kinnick Stadium	70,585	70,585	70,585	70,585	70,585	70,585	70,585	70,585	—	494,095	70,585	100%
Michigan	Michigan Stadium	109,901	110,506	114,804	110,343	110,707	111,106	112,115	113,718	114,132	897,431	112,179	102%
Michigan State	Spartan Stadium	75,005	75,910	70,249	72,119	77,515	76,405	72,219	74,128	—	518,545	74,078	98.8%
Minnesota	TCF Bank Stadium	50,805	48,807	49,950	48,802	49,187	46,543	49,158	41,549	—	333,996	47,714	93.9%
Nebraska	Memorial Stadium	81,067	84,883	85,101	85,110	85,426	85,641	85,115	85,595	—	596,871	85,267	105%
Northwestern	Ryan Field	47,130	28,042	47,330	40,004	26,886	26,215	27,137	—	—	195,614	32,602	69.1%
Ohio State	Ohio Stadium	102,329	105,001	105,016	105,096	105,306	105,511	105,159	105,493	—	736,582	105 226	102.8%
Penn State	Beaver Stadium	107,282	96,461	107,846	95,636	103,497	100,820	97,828	107,193	—	709,281	101,326	94.4%
Purdue	Ross–Ade Stadium	62,500	42,110	46,116	61,555	38,207	45,146	43,334	40,106	—	316,574	45,225	72.3%
Wisconsin	Camp Randall Stadium	80,312	77,085	80,337	78,880	81,384	80,732	79,708	—	—	478,126	79,688	99.2%

== Post-season awards and honors ==
=== Individual Big Ten Award Winners ===
- Griese-Brees Quarterback of the Year: Russell Wilson, Wisconsin
- Richter-Howard Receiver of the Year: Marvin McNutt, Iowa
- Ameche-Dayne Running Back of the Year: Montee Ball, Wisconsin
- Kwalick-Clark Tight End of the Year: Drake Dunsmore, Northwestern
- Rimington-Pace Offensive Lineman of the Year: David Molk, Michigan
- Smith-Brown Defensive Lineman of the Year: Devon Still, Penn State
- Butkus-Fitzgerald Linebacker of the Year: Lavonte David, Nebraska
- Tatum-Woodson Defensive Back of the Year: Alfonzo Dennard, Nebraska
- Bakken-Andersen Kicker of the Year: Brett Maher, Nebraska
- Eddleman-Fields Punter of the Year: Brett Maher, Nebraska

=== All-Big Ten ===
The following players were named by the coaches.:

Position	Player	Class	Team
First Team Offense
QB	Russell Wilson	Sr.	Wisconsin
RB	Montee Ball	Jr.	Wisconsin
RB	Rex Burkhead	Jr.	Nebraska
WR	A.J. Jenkins	Sr.	Illinois
WR	Marvin McNutt	Sr.	Iowa
TE	Drake Dunsmore	Sr.	Northwestern
OT	Riley Reiff	Jr.	Iowa
OG	Joel Foreman	Sr.	Michigan State
C	David Molk	Sr.	Michigan
OG	Kevin Zeitler	Sr.	Wisconsin
OT	Josh Oglesby	Sr.	Wisconsin
First Team Defense
DL	Whitney Mercilus	Jr.	Illinois
DL	Jerel Worthy	Jr.	Michigan State
DL	John Simon	Jr.	Ohio State
DL	Devon Still	Sr.	Penn State
LB	Lavonte David	Jr.	Nebraska
LB	Gerald Hodges	Sr.	Penn State
LB	Chris Borland	So.	Wisconsin
DB	Shaun Prater	Sr.	Iowa
DB	Johnny Adams	Jr.	Michigan State
DB	Alfonzo Dennard	Sr.	Nebraska
DB	Aaron Henry	Sr.	Wisconsin
First Team Special Teams
K	Brett Maher	Jr.	Nebraska
P	Brett Maher	Jr.	Nebraska

Position	Player	Class	Team
Second Team Offense
QB	Kirk Cousins	Sr.	Michigan State
RB	Marcus Coker	So.	Iowa
RB	Silas Redd	So.	Penn State
WR	B.J. Cunningham	Sr.	Michigan State
WR	Nick Toon	Sr.	Wisconsin
TE	Brian Linthicum	Sr.	Michigan State
OT	Taylor Lewan	So.	Michigan
OG	Adam Gettis	Sr.	Iowa
C	Mike Caputo	Sr.	Nebraska
C	Mike Brewster	Sr.	Ohio State
OG	Travis Frederick	So.	Wisconsin
OT	Mike Adams	Sr.	Ohio State
Second Team Defense
DL	Michael Buchanan	Jr.	Illinois
DL	Mike Daniels	Sr.	Iowa
DL	Mike Martin	Sr.	Michigan
DL	William Gholston	So.	Michigan State
DL	Jack Crawford	Sr.	Penn State
DL	Kawann Short	Jr.	Purdue
LB	Max Bullough	So.	Michigan State
LB	Andrew Sweat	Sr.	Ohio State
LB	Mike Taylor	Jr.	Wisconsin
DB	Isaiah Lewis	So.	Michigan State
DB	C.J. Barnett	So.	Ohio State
DB	Nick Sukay	Sr.	Penn State
DB	Ricardo Allen	So.	Purdue
Second Team Special Teams
K	Carson Wiggs	Sr.	Purdue
P	Cody Webster	So.	Purdue

HONORABLE MENTION: Illinois: Jeff Allen, Jonathan Brown, Derek Dimke, Terry Hawthorne, Ian Thomas; Indiana: Mitch Ewald, Jeff Thomas; Iowa: Broderick Binns, James Ferentz, Eric Guthrie, Micah Hyde, James Morris, Markus Zusevics; Michigan: Kenny Demens, J.T. Floyd, Kevin Koger, Junior Hemingway, Denard Robinson, Fitzgerald Toussaint, Ryan Van Bergen; Michigan State: Denicos Allen, Le'Veon Bell, Kenshawn Martin, Trenton Robinson, Marcus Rush; Minnesota: Kim Royston; Nebraska: Will Compton, Ben Cotton, Spencer Long, Marcel Jones, Baker Steinkuhler; Northwestern: Jeremy Ebert, Jordan Mabin, Brian Mulroe, Al Netter, Dan Persa, Brian Peters; Ohio State: Johnathan Hankins, Dan Herron, Jack Mewhort, Jake Stoneburner; Penn State: Drew Astorino, Anthony Fera, Jordan Hill, D'Anton Lynn, Derek Moye, Chima Okoli, Chaz Powell, Johnnie Troutman; Purdue: Joe Holland, Dennis Kelly; Wisconsin: Jared Abbrederis, Patrick Butrym, Antonio Fenelus, Peter Konz, Brad Nortman, Jacob Pedersen, Ricky Wagner.

The following players were named by the media panel.

Position	Player	Class	Team
First Team Offense
QB	Russell Wilson	Sr.	Wisconsin
RB	Montee Ball	Jr.	Wisconsin
RB	Rex Burkhead	Jr.	Nebraska
WR	A.J. Jenkins	Sr.	Illinois
WR	Marvin McNutt	Sr.	Iowa
TE	Drake Dunsmore	Sr.	Northwestern
OT	Riley Reiff	Jr.	Iowa
OG	Joel Foreman	Sr.	Michigan State
C	Peter Konz	Jr.	Wisconsin
OG	Kevin Zeitler	Sr.	Wisconsin
OT	Josh Oglesby	Sr.	Wisconsin
First Team Defense
DL	Whitney Mercilus	Jr.	Illinois
DL	Jerel Worthy	Jr.	Michigan State
DL	Devon Still	Sr.	Penn State
DL	Kawann Short	Jr.	Purdue
LB	Lavonte David	Jr.	Nebraska
LB	Chris Borland	So.	Wisconsin
LB	Mike Taylor	Jr.	Wisconsin
DB	Trenton Robinson	Sr.	Michigan State
DB	Alfonzo Dennard	Sr.	Nebraska
DB	Brian Peters	Sr.	Northwestern
DB	Antonio Fenelus	Sr.	Wisconsin
First Team Special Teams
K	Brett Maher	Jr.	Nebraska
P	Brett Maher	Jr.	Nebraska

Position	Player	Class	Team
Second Team Offense
QB	Denard Robinson	Jr.	Michigan
RB	Marcus Coker	So.	Iowa
RB	Silas Redd	So.	Penn State
WR	B.J. Cunningham	Sr.	Michigan State
WR	Jeremy Ebert	Sr.	Northwestern
TE	Jacob Pedersen	So.	Wisconsin
OT	Jeff Allen	Sr.	Illinois
OG	Spencer Long	So.	Nebraska
C	David Molk	Sr.	Michigan
OG	Travis Frederick	So.	Wisconsin
OT	Mike Adams	Sr.	Ohio State
Second Team Defense
DL	Michael Buchanan	Jr.	Illinois
DL	Broderick Binns	Sr.	Iowa
DL	Mike Martin	Sr.	Michigan
DL	William Gholston	So.	Michigan State
DL	John Simon	Sr.	Ohio State
LB	Jonathan Brown	Jr.	Illinois
LB	Denicos Allen	So.	Michigan State
LB	Gerald Hodges	Jr.	Penn State
DB	Micah Hyde	Sr.	Iowa
DB	Johnny Adams	Jr.	Michigan State
DB	Isaiah Lewis	So.	Michigan State
DB	Nick Sukay	Sr.	Penn State
Second Team Special Teams
K	Anthony Fera	Sr.	Penn State
P	Cody Webster	So.	Purdue

HONORABLE MENTION: Illinois: Derek Dimke, Terry Hawthorne, Travon Wilson; Indiana: Mitch Ewald; Iowa: Mike Daniels, James Ferentz, Adam Gettis, Eric Guthrie, James Morris, Tyler Nielsen, Shaun Prater, Markus Zusevics; Michigan: Kenny Demens, J.T. Floyd, Kevin Koger, Jordan Kovacs, Taylor Lewan, Craig Roh, Fitzgerald Toussaint, Ryan Van Bergen; Michigan State: Le'Veon Bell, Max Bullough, Dan Conroy, Kirk Cousins, Darqueze Dennard, Brian Linthicum, Chris McDonald, Chris Norman, Kevin Pickelman, Marcus Rush; Minnesota: Chris Bunders, Kim Royston; Nebraska: Mike Caputo, Austin Cassidy, Will Compton, Ben Cotton, Marcel Jones, Cameron Meredith, Daimion Stafford, Baker Steinkuhler; Northwestern: Kain Colter, Jordan Mabin, Brian Mulroe, Al Netter, Dan Persa; Ohio State: C.J. Barnett, Mike Brewster, Johnathan Hankins, Jack Mewhort, Tyler Moeller, Andrew Norwell, Jake Stoneburner, Andrew Sweat; Penn State: Drew Astorino, Quinn Barham, Jack Crawford, Jordan Hill, D'Anton Lynn, Chima Okoli, Chaz Powell, Nate Stupar, Johnnie Troutman; Purdue: Ricardo Allen, Dwayne Beckford, Joe Holland, Dennis Kelly, Carson Wiggs; Wisconsin: Jared Abbrederis, Patrick Butrym, Aaron Henry, Brad Nortman, Nick Toon, Ricky Wagner, Philip Welch.

=== National Award Winners ===
- David Molk, Michigan – Rimington Trophy
- Whitney Mercilus, Illinois – Ted Hendricks Award

=== First Team All-Americans ===
There are many outlets that award All-America honors in football. The NCAA uses five official selectors to also determine Consensus and Unanimous All-America honors. The five teams used by the NCAA to compile the consensus team are from the Associated Press, the AFCA, the FWAA, The Sporting News and the Walter Camp Football Foundation. A point system is used to calculate the consensus honors. The point system consists of three points for first team, two points for second team and three points for third team. No honorable mention or fourth team or lower are used in the computation.

The teams are compiled by position and the player accumulating the most points at each position is named a Consensus All-American. If there is a tie at a position in football for first team then the players who are tied shall be named to the team. A player named first-team by all five of the NCAA-recognized selectors is recognized as a Unanimous All-American.

Player	School	Position	Selector	Consensus/Unanimous
Montee Ball	Wisconsin	RB	AFCA, FWAA, AP, Sporting News, CBS Sports, ESPN, Scout.com, Sports Illustrated, Yahoo! Sports	Consensus
Jay Prosch	Illinois	FB	Pro Football Weekly	
Riley Reiff	Iowa	OT	Pro Football Weekly	
Kevin Zeitler	Wisconsin	OG	AFCA, AP, Pro Football Weekly	Consensus
Peter Konz	Wisconsin	C	AFCA, CBS Sports, Pro Football Weekly	
David Molk	Michigan	C	AP, FWAA, Sporting News, Walter Camp, Scout.com	Consensus
Whitney Mercilus	Illinois	DE	AFCA, AP, FWAA, Sporting News, Walter Camp, CBS Sports, ESPN, Scout.com, Yahoo! Sports	Unanimous
Devon Still	Penn State	DT	AP, FWAA, Sporting News, Walter Camp, CBS Sports, ESPN, Pro Football Weekly, Scout.com, Sports Illustrated, Yahoo! Sports	Consensus
Jerel Worthy	Michigan State	DT	AFCA, AP, Sporting News, Walter Camp, CBS Sports, Scout.com, Yahoo! Sports	Consensus
Lavonte David	Nebraska	LB	AFCA, CBS Sports, ESPN, Yahoo! Sports	
Brett Maher	Nebraska	PK	Yahoo! Sports	

=== Academic All-American ===
The Big Ten led all conferences with 7 Academic All-America selections: 1st team – Rex Burkhead (Nebraska), Austin Cassidy (Nebraska), Patrick Ward (Northwestern) and Joe Holland (Purdue); 2nd team – Mike Sadler (Michigan State), Sean Fisher (Nebraska) and Jacob Schmidt (Northwestern). Cassidy was one of four repeat first-team winners, while Holland was a 2010 second-team selection.

== Bowl games ==
Big Ten Bowl Games
No.	Game	Date	Location/Time*	Television	Big Ten Team^{+}	Score	Opponent^{+}	Score	Payout (US$) per team
1.	Little Caesars Bowl	Dec. 27, 2011	Ford Field; Detroit, Michigan; 4:30 pm	ESPN	**Purdue** (6–6)	37	Western Michigan (7–5)	32	$750,000
2.	Insight Bowl	Dec. 30, 2011	Sun Devil Stadium; Tempe, Arizona; 10:00 pm	ESPN	Iowa (7–5)	14	#19 **Oklahoma** (9–3)	31	$1,200,000
3.	Meineke Car Care Bowl of Texas	Dec. 31, 2011	Reliant Stadium; Houston Texas; 12:00 pm	ESPN	Northwestern (6–6)	22	**Texas A&M** (6–6)	33	$1,700,000
4.	Kraft Fight Hunger Bowl	Dec. 31, 2011	AT&T Park; San Francisco, California; 3:30 pm	ESPN	**Illinois** (6–6)	20	UCLA (6–7)	14	$750,000–$825,000
5.	TicketCity Bowl	Jan. 2, 2012	Cotton Bowl; Dallas, Texas; 12:00 pm	ESPNU	#24 Penn State (9–3)	14	#20 **Houston** (12–1)	30	$1,200,000
6.	Outback Bowl	Jan. 2, 2012	Raymond James Stadium; Tampa, Florida; 1:00 pm	ABC	#12 **Michigan State** (10–3)	33	#18 Georgia (10–3)	30	$3,400,000
7.	Capital One Bowl	Jan. 2, 2012	Citrus Bowl; Orlando, Florida; 1:00 pm	ESPN	#21 Nebraska (9–3)	13	#10 **South Carolina** (10–2)	30	$4,250,000
8.	TaxSlayer.com Gator Bowl	Jan. 2, 2012	EverBank Field; Jacksonville, Florida; 1:00 pm	ESPN2	Ohio State (6–6)	17	**Florida** (6–6)	24	$2,500,000
9.	Rose Bowl	Jan. 2, 2012	Rose Bowl; Pasadena, California; 5:10 pm	ESPN	#9 Wisconsin (11–2)	38	#6 **Oregon** (11–2)	45	$18,000,000
10.	Allstate Sugar Bowl	Jan. 3, 2012	Mercedes-Benz Superdome; New Orleans, Louisiana; 8:30 pm	ESPN	#13 **Michigan** (10–2)	23	#17 Virginia Tech (11–2)	20	$17,000,000
*Time given is Eastern Time (UTC-5).^{+}Winning team is **bolded**. Rankings are AP.

== 2012 NFL draft ==
The conference lost 4 players in the first round of the NFL Draft: A total of 41 Big Ten players were drafted.

Team	Round 1	Round 2	Round 3	Round 4	Round 5	Round 6	Round 7	Total
Illinois	2	2						4
Indiana								0
Iowa	1	1		1	2	1	1	7
Michigan			1				2	3
Michigan State		1		2		2	1	6
Minnesota								0
Nebraska		1		1			2	4
Northwestern							2	2
Ohio State		1	1			2		4
Penn State		1			2		1	4
Purdue					1	1		2
Wisconsin	1	1	1	1	1	1		6

Rnd.	Pick	Team	Player	Pos.	College	Notes
1	23	Detroit Lions	Riley Reiff	T	Iowa	
1	26	Houston Texans	Whitney Mercilus	DE	Illinois	
1	27	Cincinnati Bengals	Kevin Zeitler	G	Wisconsin	from New Orleans via New England (Note: No. 27: multiple trades: No. 27: New Orleans → New England (PD). New Orleans traded this selection and their 2011 second-round selection (No. 56, New England selected Shane Vereen) to New England for New England's first-round selection in the 2011 Draft (No. 28, New Orleans selected Mark Ingram II). No. 27: New England → Cincinnati (D). see No. 21: Cincinnati → New England.)
1	30	San Francisco 49ers	A. J. Jenkins	WR	Illinois	
2	44	Kansas City Chiefs	Jeff Allen	G	Illinois	
2	48	New England Patriots	Tavon Wilson	S	Illinois	from Oakland (Note: No. 48: Oakland → New England (PD). Oakland traded this selection and a 2011 seventh-round selection (No. 219, New England selected Malcolm Williams) to New England for New England's third- and fourth-round selections in 2011 (Nos. 92 and 125, Oakland selected Joseph Barksdale and Taiwan Jones, respectively).)
2	51	Green Bay Packers	Jerel Worthy	DT	Michigan State	from Arizona via Philadelphia (Note: No. 51: Arizona → Philadelphia (PD). Arizona traded this selection and CB Dominique Rodgers-Cromartie to Philadelphia for QB Kevin Kolb.)
2	53	Cincinnati Bengals	Devon Still	DT	Penn State	
2	55	Atlanta Falcons	Peter Konz	C	Wisconsin	
2	56	Pittsburgh Steelers	Mike Adams	T	Ohio State	
2	58	Tampa Bay Buccaneers	Lavonte David	LB	Nebraska	from Houston
3	68	Houston Texans	DeVier Posey	WR	Ohio State	from Tampa Bay
3	75	Seattle Seahawks	Russell Wilson	QB	Wisconsin	
3	82	Tennessee Titans	Mike Martin	DT	Michigan	
4	102	Washington Redskins	Kirk Cousins	QB	Michigan State	
4	121	Houston Texans	Keshawn Martin	WR	Michigan State	
4	122	New Orleans Saints	Nick Toon	WR	Wisconsin	
4	126	Houston Texans	Jared Crick	DE	Nebraska	from New England via Denver and Tampa Bay (Note: No. 126: multiple trades: No. 126: New England → Denver (D). see No. 25: Denver → New England. No. 126: Denver → Tampa Bay (D). see No. 31: Denver → Tampa Bay.)
4*	132	Green Bay Packers	Mike Daniels	DT	Iowa	
5	141	Washington Redskins	Adam Gettis	G	Iowa	
5	149	San Diego Chargers	Johnnie Troutman	G	Penn State	
5	153	Philadelphia Eagles	Dennis Kelly	T	Purdue	
5	156	Cincinnati Bengals	Shaun Prater	CB	Iowa	
5	157	Atlanta Falcons	Bradie Ewing	FB	Wisconsin	
5	158	Oakland Raiders	Jack Crawford	DE	Penn State	
6	180	San Francisco 49ers	Trenton Robinson	S	Michigan State	from Carolina
6	183	Miami Dolphins	B.J. Cunningham	WR	Michigan State	from San Diego
6	191	Cincinnati Bengals	Dan Herron	RB	Ohio State	
6	194	Philadelphia Eagles	Marvin McNutt	WR	Iowa	from Denver (Note: No. 194: Denver → Philadelphia (PD). Denver traded this selection to Philadelphia for linebacker Joe Mays. Denver originally sent running back J. J. Arrington to Philadelphia, with the condition that if Arrington did not make Philadelphia's 53-man roster, Denver would instead send the sixth-round selection.)
6	195	Houston Texans	Nick Mondek	T	Purdue	
6*	207	Carolina Panthers	Brad Nortman	P	Wisconsin	
7	217	Washington Redskins	Jordan Bernstine	CB	Iowa	from Buffalo
7	224	New England Patriots	Alfonzo Dennard	CB	Nebraska	from New York Jets (Note: No. 224: New York Jets → Green Bay (PD). The Jets traded this selection to Green Bay in exchange for guard Caleb Schlauderaff.)
7	226	San Diego Chargers	David Molk	C	Michigan	
7	230	Detroit Lions	Nathan Stupar	OLB	Penn State	
7	233	Tampa Bay Buccaneers	Drake Dunsmore	TE	Northwestern University	from Houston
7	234	New Orleans Saints	Marcel Jones	T	Nebraska	
7	235	New England Patriots	Jeremy Ebert	WR	Northwestern University	
7	238	Kansas City Chiefs	Junior Hemingway	WR	Michigan	from New England (Note: No. 238: New England → Kansas City (PD). New England traded this conditional selection to Kansas City for safety Jarrad Page.)
7*	250	San Diego Chargers	Edwin Baker	RB	Michigan State	

== Head coaches ==
- Ron Zook and Vic Koenning (for bowl game), Illinois
- Kevin R. Wilson, Indiana
- Kirk Ferentz, Iowa
- Brady Hoke, Michigan
- Mark Dantonio, Michigan State
- Jerry Kill, Minnesota
- Bo Pelini, Nebraska
- Pat Fitzgerald, Northwestern
- Luke Fickell, Ohio State
- Joe Paterno (first nine games) and Tom Bradley (last three games), Penn State
- Danny Hope, Purdue
- Bret Bielema, Wisconsin

Joe Paterno was fired as head coach of the Penn State Nittany Lions on November 9 in the wake of the Penn State sex abuse scandal. Defensive coordinator Tom Bradley was named interim head coach for the remainder of the season.

== Notes ==
- July 28–29, 2011 – Media Days in Chicago.
