= 2011 Penn State Nittany Lions football team =

American college football season

2011 Penn State Nittany Lions football

Big Ten Leaders Division co-champion

TicketCity Bowl, L 14–30 vs. Houston
- Conference: Big Ten Conference
- Leaders Division
- Record: 9–4 (6–2 Big Ten)
- Head coach: Joe Paterno (46th season; first 9 games); Tom Bradley (interim; remainder of season)
- Offensive coordinator: Galen Hall (8th season)
- Offensive scheme: Spread
- Defensive coordinator: Tom Bradley (12th season; first 9 games)
- Co-defensive coordinators: Larry Johnson (interim; remainder of season); Ron Vanderlinden (interim; remainder of season)
- Base defense: 4–3
- Captains: Drew Astorino; Quinn Barham; Derek Moye; Devon Still
- Home stadium: Beaver Stadium

2011 Big Ten Conference football standings
	Conf.			Overall
Team	W		L	W		L
Legends Division
No. 11 Michigan State x	7	–	1	11	–	3
No. 12 Michigan %	6	–	2	11	–	2
No. 24 Nebraska	5	–	3	9	–	4
Iowa	4	–	4	7	–	6
Northwestern	3	–	5	6	–	7
Minnesota	2	–	6	3	–	9
Leaders Division
No. 10 Wisconsin xy$	6	–	2	11	–	3
Penn State x	6	–	2	9	–	4
Purdue	4	–	4	7	–	6
Ohio State	3	–	5	6	–	7
Illinois	2	–	6	7	–	6
Indiana	0	–	8	1	–	11
Championship: Wisconsin 42, Michigan State 39
$ – BCS representative as conference champion; % – BCS at-large representative; x – Division champion/co-champions; y – Championship game participant; Rankings from AP Poll

The 2011 Penn State Nittany Lions football team represented the Pennsylvania State University in the 2011 NCAA Division I FBS football season. The team played its home games in Beaver Stadium in University Park, Pennsylvania, US. They were members of the Big Ten Conference in the newly formed Leaders Division. They finished the season 9–4, 6–2 in the Leaders Division to be co–division champions with Wisconsin. Due to their head-to-head loss to Wisconsin, they did not represent the division in the inaugural Big Ten Championship Game. They were invited to the TicketCity Bowl where they lost to Houston 14–30.

The team was coached by Joe Paterno for the first nine games until he was fired in the wake of the Penn State sex abuse scandal, with defensive coordinator Tom Bradley taking over as interim head coach for the remainder of the season.

The team was ranked number one in academic achievement out of the top 25 ranked BCS teams.

== Preseason ==
The team captains for Penn State's 125th season of football were tackle Quinn Barham, wide receiver Derek Moye, safety Drew Astorino, and defensive tackle Devon Still.

Penn State began the season with an unsettled quarterback situation. Sophomore Rob Bolden and former walk-on junior Matt McGloin split starting duties in the 2010 season. Rob Bolden was named the starter for the season opener against Indiana State.

=== Preseason awards ===
- Drew Astorino
  second-team Athlon Sports pre-season All-American
  fourth-team Phil Steele pre-season All-Big Ten
- Quinn Barham
  third-team Athlon Sports pre-season All-American
  fourth-team Phil Steele pre-season All-Big Ten
- Jack Crawford
  third-team Phil Steele pre-season All-Big Ten
- Anthony Fera
  second-team Athlon Sports pre-season All-American
  third-team Phil Steele pre-season All-Big Ten
- Gerald Hodges
  second-team Phil Steele pre-season All-Big Ten
- D'Anton Lynn
  third-team Phil Steele pre-season All-Big Ten
- Michael Mauti
  first-team Athlon Sports pre-season All-American
  first-team Phil Steele pre-season All-Big Ten
- Derek Moye
  first-team Athlon Sports pre-season All-American
  first-team Phil Steele pre-season All-Big Ten
- Chaz Powell
  fourth-team Phil Steele pre-season All-Big Ten
- Silas Redd
  third-team Athlon Sports pre-season All-American
  third-team Phil Steele pre-season All-Big Ten
- Devon Smith
  second-team Athlon Sports pre-season All-American
  second-team Phil Steele pre-season All-Big Ten
- Devon Still
  third-team Athlon Sports pre-season All-American
  third-team Phil Steele pre-season All-Big Ten
- Nick Sukay
  third-team Phil Steele pre-season All-Big Ten
- Johnnie Troutman
  fourth-team Phil Steele pre-season All-Big Ten

== Rankings ==
Ranking movements Legend: ██ Increase in ranking ██ Decrease in ranking — = Not ranked RV = Received votes
	Week															
Poll	Pre	1	2	3	4	5	6	7	8	9	10	11	12	13	14	Final
AP	RV	23	RV	RV	RV	RV	RV	RV	21	16	12	21	20	23	24	—
Coaches	25	20	RV	RV	RV	RV	25	22	19	15	12	21	19	22	23	—
Harris	Not released						RV	24	19	16	12	19	18	22	23	Not released
BCS	Not released							21	19	16	12	21	19	21	22	Not released

== Schedule ==
Date	Time	Opponent	Rank	Site	TV	Result	Attendance
September 3	12:00 p.m.	Indiana State*		Beaver Stadium; University Park, PA	BTN	W 41–7	96,461
September 10	3:30 p.m.	No. 3 Alabama*	No. 23	Beaver Stadium; University Park, PA (rivalry)	ABC	L 11–27	107,846
September 17	12:00 p.m.	at Temple*		Lincoln Financial Field; Philadelphia, PA	ESPN	W 14–10	57,323
September 24	12:00 p.m.	Eastern Michigan*		Beaver Stadium; University Park, PA	ESPN2	W 34–6	95,636
October 1	12:00 p.m.	at Indiana		Memorial Stadium; Bloomington, IN	ESPNU	W 16–10	42,621
October 8	3:30 p.m.	Iowa		Beaver Stadium; University Park, PA	ABC/ESPN	W 13–3	103,497
October 15	12:00 p.m.	Purdue^{†}		Beaver Stadium; University Park, PA	BTN	W 23–18	100,820
October 22	7:00 p.m.	at Northwestern		Ryan Field; Evanston, IL	BTN	W 34–24	40,004
October 29	3:30 p.m.	Illinois	No. 21	Beaver Stadium; University Park, PA	ABC/ESPN2	W 10–7	97,828
November 12	12:00 p.m.	No. 19 Nebraska	No. 12	Beaver Stadium; University Park, PA	ESPN	L 14–17	107,193
November 19	3:30 p.m.	at Ohio State	No. 21	Ohio Stadium; Columbus, OH (rivalry)	ABC/ESPN	W 20–14	104,994
November 26	3:30 p.m.	at No. 15 Wisconsin	No. 20	Camp Randall Stadium; Madison, WI	ESPN	L 7–45	79,708
January 2, 2012	12:00 p.m.	vs. No. 20 Houston*	No. 24	Cotton Bowl; Dallas, TX (TicketCity Bowl)	ESPNU	L 14–30	46,817
*Non-conference game; ^{†}Homecoming; Rankings from AP Poll released prior to the game; All times are in Eastern time

== Coaching staff ==
- Joe Paterno - head coach (first 9 games)
- Tom Bradley – interim head coach (final 4 games)
- Dick Anderson – guards and centers coach
- Kermit Buggs – defensive backs
- Galen Hall – offensive coordinator and running backs
- Larry Johnson, Sr. – co-defensive coordinator/defensive line
- Bill Kavanaugh – wide receivers coach/recruiting coordinator
- Bill Kenney – offensive tackles and tight ends
- Mike McQueary – wide receivers and recruiting coordinator (placed on administrative leave November 11, 2011)
- Jay Paterno – passing game coordinator/quarterbacks coach
- Elijah Robinson – defensive line
- Ron Vanderlinden – co-defensive coordinator and linebackers
- John Thomas – strength and conditioning

== Roster ==
2011 Penn State Nittany Lions football team roster
Players
Coaches
Offense

Pos.	#	Name	Class
QB	1	Rob Bolden	So
QB	2	Shane McGregor	Jr
RB	3	Brandon Beachum	Jr
WR	4	Evan Lewis	Jr
WR	5	Bill Belton	Fr
WR	6	Derek Moye (C)	Sr
WR	7	Curtis Drake	So
WR	8	Allen Robinson	Fr
RB	9	Michael Zordich	Jr
TE	10	Kevin Haplea	So
QB	11	Matt McGloin	Jr
QB	12	John Cabot	Fr
QB	13	Paul Jones	Fr
QB	14	Garrett Venuto	So
WR	15	Patrick Flanagan	Fr
WR	16	Ryan Scherer	Jr
WR	17	Christian Kuntz	So
WR	18	Andrew Goodman	Jr
WR	19	Justin Brown	Jr
WR	20	Devon Smith	Jr
RB	21	Stephfon Green	Sr
WR	23	Brian Friend	So
RB	24	Derek Day	Jr
RB	25	Silas Redd	So
RB	26	Curtis Dukes	So
WR	27	Tariq Tongue	So
FB	33	Andre Dupree	So
TE	33	Michael Yancich	Jr
FB	35	Pat Zerbe	So
RB	36	Deron Thompson	Fr
RB	37	Joe Suhey	Sr
RB	40	Zach Zwinak	Fr
FB	45	P.J. Byers	So
G	50	DeOn'tae Pannell	Sr
OT	52	Chima Okoli	Sr
C	54	Matt Stankiewitch	Jr
C	55	Wendy Laurent	Fr
G, OT	56	Anthony Alosi	Fr
OT	58	Adam Gress	So
C	60	Ty Howle	So
G	62	Frank Figueroa	So
G	64	John Urschel	So
C	65	Miles Dieffenbach	Fr
OL	66	Angelo Mangiro	Fr
OT	67	Quinn Barham (C)	Sr
OL	68	Ryan Nowicki	Fr
OT	70	Nate Cadogan	So
G	72	Khamrone Kolb	Fr
G	73	Mark Arcidiacono	So
G	74	Johnnie Troutman	Sr
G	75	Eric Shrive	So
OT	76	Donovan Smith	Fr
OT	77	Patrick Christie	Fr
OT	78	Mike Farrell	Jr
OL	79	Kevin Blanchard	Fr
TE	80	Andrew Szczerba	Sr
WR	81	Shawney Kersey	So
TE	82	Brian Irvin	Jr
WR	83	Matt Zanellato	Fr
WR	85	Brandon Moseby-Felder	So
TE	87	Kyle Carter	Fr
TE	88	J.D. Mason	Sr
TE	89	Garry Gilliam	So

Defense

Pos.	#	Name	Class
S	1	Nick Sukay	Sr
CB	2	Chaz Powell	Sr
CB	4	Adrian Amos	Fr
CB	5	Derrick Thomas	So
LB	6	Gerald Hodges	Jr
S	7	Stephen Obeng-Agyapong	So
CB	8	D'Anton Lynn	Sr
S	10	Malcolm Willis	So
LB	11	Khairi Fortt	So
CB	12	Stephon Morris	Jr
S	13	Tim Buckley	Fr
CB	14	Mike Wallace	So
CB	15	Alex Kenney	Fr
CB	16	Devin Pryor	So
DE	18	Deion Barnes	Fr
LB	22	T.J. Rhattigan	Fr
S	23	Ryan Keiser	Fr
S	24	Jonathan Duckett	Fr
LB	26	Kyle Lucas	So
S	27	Jacob Fagnano	Jr
S	28	Drew Astorina (C)	Sr
S	29	Jeff Cully	Fr
LB	31	Brad Bars	Fr
LB	32	Dakota Royer	Fr
LB	34	Nathan Stupar	Sr
LB	38	Ben Kline	Fr
CB	39	Jesse Della Valle	Fr
LB	40	Glenn Carson	So
DT	41	J.R. Refice	So
LB	42	Michael Mauti	Jr
LB	43	Mike Hull	Fr
LB	46	Ken Pollock	Jr
DL	47	Jordan Hill	Jr
DE	48	Jordan Kerner	Fr
LB	54	James Van Fleet	Jr
DE	56	Eric Latimore	Sr
DE	59	Pete Massaro	Jr
DT	71	Devon Still (C)	Sr
DT	75	Evan Hailes	Fr
DE	81	Jack Crawford	Sr
DT	84	Kyle Baublitz	Fr
DE	86	C.J. Olaniyan	Fr
DE	90	Sean Stanley	Jr
DT	91	DaQuan Jones	So
DT	92	Anthony Alosi	Fr
DT	93	James Terry	Jr
DE	94	Shawn Oakman	Fr
DT	96	Cody Castor	Jr
DT	97	Luke Graham	Fr
DE	98	Anthony Zettel	Fr

Special teams

Pos.	#	Name	Class
K	30	Anthony Fera	So
LS	44	Michael Fuhrman	Jr
P	45	Alex Butterworth	So
LS	53	Jon Rohrbaugh	Sr
LS	57	Emery Etter	So
PK	97	Sam Ficken	Fr

Head coach

- Joe Paterno (head coach-first 9 games)
- Tom Bradley (interim head coach-final 4 games)

Coordinators/assistant coaches

Legend

- (C) Team captain
- (S) Suspended
- (I) Ineligible
- Injured
- Redshirt

Roster
Last update: October, 2011

== Game summaries ==
=== September 3 vs. Indiana State ===
	1	2	3	4	Total
Indiana State	0	0	0	7	7
#25 Penn State	14	14	6	7	41

The Nittany Lions defeated the NCAA Football Championship Subdivision, Indiana State Sycamores 41–7. Rob Bolden started for the Nittany Lions at quarterback and shared QB duties with Matt McGloin. The game began with a 95-yard kick-off return for touchdown by Chaz Powell. Silas Redd ran for 104 yards on 12 carries scored two touchdowns. and fullbacks Joe Suhey and Michael Zordich each had one running touchdown. Third string quarterback Shane McGregor closed the scoring for Penn State with a 3-yard run in the fourth quarter. The Sycamores were able to score the final touchdown of the game against Penn State's third and fourth string defense. Head coach Joe Paterno, still recovering from injuries sustained in a practice collision with Devon Smith coached from the press box.

TV announcers = Big Ten Network Matt Devlin, Glen Mason & Dionne Miller

=== September 10 vs. Alabama ===
	1	2	3	4	Total
#3 Alabama	7	10	3	7	27
#23 Penn State	3	0	0	8	11

The third ranked Alabama Crimson Tide, coached by Nick Saban, defeated the Nittany Lions 27–11 at Beaver Stadium. Rob Bolden was once again the starting quarterback and shared playing time with Matt McGloin. Bolden completed 11 of 29 passes for 144 yards and one interception while McGloin was 1 of 10 for 0 yards. Penn State took the opening possession down the field and recorded a 43-yard field goal by Evan Lewis. The Nittany Lions were held scoreless through the second, third, and most of the fourth quarters when Silas Redd scored a one-yard touchdown. Bolden converted the two-point conversion to bring the Penn State total to 11 points.

TV announcers ABC: Brad Nessler, Todd Blackledge and Holly Rowe

=== September 17 at Temple ===
	1	2	3	4	Total
Penn State	0	7	0	7	14
Temple	7	3	0	0	10

Penn State defeated Temple 14 – 10 at Lincoln Financial Field in Philadelphia. Fullback Michael Zordich scored the game-winning touchdown on a 1-yard dive with 2:42 to play in the game. While the offense, once again led by quarterbacks Rob Bolden and Matt McGloin, struggled the defense was able to keep the game within reach. Derek Moye had 7 receptions for 112 yards with all 7 catches being good for a Penn State first down. Chaz Powell and Michael Mauti each picked off one Temple pass and Nick Sukay recovered a fumble. Mauti's interception set up the Penn State offense at the Temple 44 with 8:46 remaining. Bolden led the game-winning drive that was highlighted by two successful fourth down conversions and a Zordich recovery of a fumbled snap between Bolden and center Matt Stankiewitch. Despite the close score, Temple finished with only 197 yards of offense, their fewest since a 27–13 win over Army in 2009, where they had only 195. It's also only the fourth time since 2008 that Temple has finished with less than 200 yards of offense.

=== September 24 vs. Eastern Michigan ===
	1	2	3	4	Total
Eastern Michigan	0	0	0	6	6
Penn State	3	14	14	3	34

The Nittany Lions defeated the Eagles 34–6. The victory marked the first time in the 2011 season that head coach Joe Paterno coached from the sidelines. He spent the first half on the field and coached the second half from the press box. Rob Bolden and Matt McGloin shared quarterback duties again. McGloin threw three touchdown passes, one to fullback Joe Suhey and two to wide receiver Derek Moye who became the sixth Nittany Lion to have more than 2,000 yards receiving in his career. Bolden threw a 71-yard pass to receiver Devon Smith. Kickers Anthony Fera and Sam Ficken each kicked a field goal. Fera was the first Penn State player to punt, kick-off, and serve as the place kicker in a single game since 1975 when Chris Bahr did the same. The Penn State defense limited the Eagles offense to just two fourth-quarter field goals and picked up three turnovers including an interception by Nick Sukay. Malcolm Willis blocked an Eastern Michigan punt. Linebacker Michael Mauti and cornerback D'Anton Lynn both left the game with apparently severe injuries. Mauti injured his knee and is out for the season with an ACL injury to his left knee. Lynn was placed on a backboard as a precautionary measure and was admitted to the local hospital. Post game reports said that Lynn was able to move his arms and legs and may have suffered a stinger, which caused a burning sensation in his extremities.

=== October 1 at Indiana ===
	1	2	3	4	Total
Penn State	0	3	10	3	16
Indiana	3	0	0	7	10

The game against the Indiana Hoosiers was Joe Paterno's 700th game as a member of the Penn State coaching staff. He has been coaching at Penn State since 1950 when he moved to Penn State from Brown University with his mentor and predecessor Rip Engle. The Nittany Lions defeated the Hoosiers 16–10 for Paterno's 405th career win as head coach. Both offenses struggled throughout most of the game. Rob Bolden started for Penn State at quarterback and shared playing time with Matt McGloin. Derek Moye caught a 74-yard touchdown pass from McGloin in the third quarter. Kicker Anthony Fera was successful on 3 of 4 field goal attempts. Chaz Powell had one interception and Devon Still recovered a fumble that was forced by Sean Stanley. Silas Redd led the Nittany Lion ground game with 126 yards on 30 carries. Penn State committed two turnovers in the red zone, Bolden threw an interception to Forisse Hardin and Redd fumbled the ball at the three-yard line.

=== October 8 vs. Iowa ===
	1	2	3	4	Total
Iowa	0	3	0	0	3
Penn State	3	3	0	7	13

Penn State defeated Iowa 13 – 3. The victory over the Hawkeyes was just the second win in the series for the Nittany Lions since 2000. Rob Bolden started the game, but played just two series. Matt McGloin took the rest of the snaps at quarterback and completed a 2-yard touchdown to Kevin Haplea. The Penn State defense produced five sacks and three turnovers, one fumble and two interceptions to help control the game. The running game led by Silas Redd and Curtis Dukes ran up 231 yards on the ground to help control the clock and keep the Iowa offense off the field. Joe Paterno, still recovering from off season injuries spent the first half on the sidelines before moving to the pressbox in the second half. Penn State honored the 1986 National Champions at halftime of the game to commemorate the 25th anniversary of Penn State's upset victory over the Miami Hurricanes in the 1987 Fiesta Bowl.

=== October 15 vs. Purdue ===
Team	1	2	3	4	Total
Purdue	3	3	6	6	18
• Penn State	7	3	10	3	23

- Date: October 15
- Location: Beaver Stadium, University Park, PA
- Game start: 12:00 p.m. EST
- TV announcers (BTN): Tom Hart, Derek Rackley & Lisa Byington

Scoring summary
1	PSU	4:38	Curtis Dukes 1-yard run (Anthony Fera kick)	PSU 7-0
1	1:39	PUR	Carson Wiggs 28-yard field goal	PSU 7-3
2	4:36	PUR	Carson Wiggs 32-yard field goal	PSU 7-6
2	0:00	PSU	Anthony Fera 29-yard field goal	PSU 10-6
3	5:57	PSU	Anthony Fera 40-yard field goal	PSU 13-6
3	4:02	PUR	O.J. Ross 14-yard pass from Caleb TerBush (kick failed)	PSU 13-12
3	2:37	PSU	Silas Redd 9-yard run (Anthony Fera kick)	PSU 20-12
4	8:08	PUR	Akeem Shavers 1-yard run (run failed)	PSU 20-18
4	6:24	PSU	Anthony Fera 29-yard field goal	PSU 23-18

Penn State defeated the Purdue Boilermakers 23 – 18 for a homecoming victory and to go to 6 – 1 on the season and 3 – 0 in the Big Ten. Rob Bolden once again started at quarterback, but Matt McGloin took the great majority of the snaps. He threw one interception that bounced off the feet of receiver Bill Belton and into the arms of the Boilermaker's Albert Evans who returned it 55 yards from the endzone. Silas Redd ran for 131 yards and one touchdown. Backup tailback Curtis Dukes scored his first career touchdown. The Penn State defense came up with three interceptions, two by linebacker Nate Stupar and one by safety Nick Sukay. Starting wide receiver Derek Moye missed the game with a foot injury and coach Joe Paterno, still recovering from off season injuries, spent the entire game in the pressbox.

=== October 22 at Northwestern ===
Team	1	2	3	4	Total
• Penn State	14	13	7	0	34
Northwestern	14	10	0	0	24

- Date: October 22
- Location: Ryan Field, Evanston, IL
- Game start: 7:00 p.m. EST
- TV announcers (BTN): Tom Hart, Derek Rackley & Lisa Byington

Scoring summary
1	12:17	NW	Dan Persa 1-yard run (Jeff Budzien kick)	NW 7-0
1	8:44	PSU	Justin Brown 4-yard pass from Matt McGloin (Anthony Fera kick)	Tied 7-7
1	5:51	PSU	Devon Smith 45-yard pass from Matt McGloin (Anthony Fera kick)	PSU 14-7
1	1:54	NW	Kain Colter 12-yard pass from Dan Persa (Jeff Budzien kick)	Tied 14-14
2	12:26	PSU	Anthony Fera 37-yard field goal	PSU 17-14
2	8:43	NW	Kain Colter 4-yard run (Jeff Budzien kick)	NW 21-17
2	4:01	PSU	Anthony Fera 33-yard field goal	NW 21-20
2	0:47	NW	Jeff Budzien 25-yard field goal	NW 24-20
2	0:07	PSU	Stephfon Green 1-yard run (Anthony Fera kick)	PSU 27-24
3	11:39	PSU	Silas Redd 19-yard run (Anthony Fera kick)	PSU 34-24

Penn State defeated Northwestern 34–24 giving Joe Paterno his 408th career win and tying him with Grambling's legendary Eddie Robinson. Matt McGloin started and played the entire game at quarterback. The first half was an offensive shoot-out and the second a defensive struggle. Despite the fact that McGloin took every snap at quarterback, both Joe and quarterback coach Jay Paterno stated that the competition between McGloin and Rob Bolden to be the starter was still active. The defensive star of the game was linebacker Gerald Hodges. He had a career-high 14 tackles and returned an interception thrown by Bethlehem, Pennsylvania native Dan Persa for 63 yards. Anthony Fera kicked two field goals to go with the four touchdowns produced by the Nittany Lions. McGloin threw touchdown passes to Justin Brown and Devon Smith. Silas Redd and Stephon Green both scored one running touchdown.

=== October 29 vs. Illinois ===
Team	1	2	3	4	Total
Illinois	0	0	7	0	7
• Penn State	0	0	0	10	10

- Date: October 29
- Location: Beaver Stadium, University Park, PA
- Game start: 3:30 p.m. EST
- TV announcers (ABC/ESPN2): Carter Blackburn, Brock Huard

Scoring summary
3	3:32	ILL	Spencer Harris 10-yard pass from Nathan Scheelhaase (Derek Dimke kick)	ILL 7-0
4	7:00	PSU	Anthony Fera 30-yard field goal	ILL 7-3
4	1:08	PSU	Silas Redd 3-yard run (Anthony Fera kick)	PSU 10-3

Paterno earned his 409th win and passed Grambling State's Eddie Robinson as Division I's winningest coach in what would unexpectedly become his final game at Penn State. The game at halftime was 0–0, Illinois took a 7–0 lead in the 3rd quarter on a 10-yard pass from quarterback Nathan Scheelhaase to wide receiver Spencer Harris. A blocked punt by Brad Bars set up Penn State's first score of the game, a thirty-yard field goal by Anthony Fera with 7:00 remaining. Matt McGloin led Penn State on the game-winning drive that was sparked by the return from injury of Derek Moye. The Nittany Lions drove 80 yards down the field in the final three minutes of the game. A three-yard touchdown run by running back Silas Redd put the Lions ahead 10–7. Illinois drove into field goal range, and attempted a 42-yard field goal. The field goal hit the right upright, and Penn State won 10–7. Redd topped 1,000 yards for the season while running for 137 yards on 30 carries. Linebacker Gerald Hodges led the defense with 19 tackles, a forced fumble, and two pass break-ups.

=== November 12 vs. Nebraska ===
	1	2	3	4	Total
#19 Nebraska	0	10	7	0	17
#12 Penn State	0	0	7	7	14

This was the first Nittany Lion's game not coached by Joe Paterno in 46 years due to his firing for his involvement in the Penn State child sex abuse scandal. Penn State fell behind 10–0 at halftime and trailed 17–0 after a Matt McGloin fumble in the third quarter that led to a Nebraska touchdown. Penn State rallied, however, and even had a chance to win after scoring two touchdowns and narrowing the deficit to 17–14. Had Penn State won the game, they would have been two regular-season wins away from a likely Big Ten championship appearance. (They went on to beat Ohio State and to lose to Wisconsin.) However, a last gasp play from near mid-field ended hopes of a comeback. This game was marked with much emotion with a blue-out (in contrast to the normal white-out) at Beaver Stadium in support of the alleged victims of Sandusky's crimes. Nebraska and Penn State gathered for a prayer at midfield for the victims and the fans showed the support for their team with a standing ovation at the end of the game despite the loss.

=== November 19 at Ohio State ===
Team	1	2	3	4	Total
• Penn State	10	10	0	0	20
Ohio State	0	14	0	0	14

- Date: November 19
- Location: Ohio Stadium, Columbus, OH
- Game start: 3:30 p.m. EST
- TV announcers (ESPN/ABC regional): Brad Nessler, Todd Blackledge & Holly Rowe

Scoring summary
1	12:27	PSU	Stephfon Green 39-yard run (Anthony Fera kick)	PSU 7-0
1	1:59	PSU	Anthony Fera 39-yard field goal	PSU 10-0
2	12:32	OSU	Braxton Miller 24-yard run (Drew Basil kick)	PSU 10-7
2	10:05	PSU	Stephfon Green 4-yard run (Anthony Fera kick)	PSU 17-7
2	5:22	OSU	Jake Stoneburner 7-yard pass from Braxton Miller (Drew Basil kick)	PSU 17-14
2	0:00	PSU	Anthony Fera 46-yard field goal	PSU 20-14

Penn State defeated Ohio State 20–14. Stephon Green ran for two touchdowns and Anthony Fera kicked two field goals for the Nittany Lions. It was Penn State's first and only win with Tom Bradley as coach. All of the scoring in the game was contained to the first half. Penn State had success running the Wildcat formation with Curtis Drake and Bill Belton taking snaps while quarterback Matt McGloin lined up in the slot. This victory took the show down for the Leaders Division championship to their final regular season game at Wisconsin. Penn State won the game despite being a seven-point underdog according to Las Vegas bookmakers. It was the first time since 2001 against Northwestern that the Nittany Lions were victorious despite being so heavily favored to lose.

=== November 26 at Wisconsin ===
	1	2	3	4	Total
#19 Penn State	7	0	0	0	7
#12 Wisconsin	7	21	14	3	45

The winner of this matchup was guaranteed to represent the Leaders division in the inaugural Big Ten Championship Game in Indianapolis. Penn State lost to Wisconsin 7–45 to close out the regular season. The Nittany Lions took a 7–0 lead in the first quarter on a 44-yard touchdown pass from Matt McGloin to Curtis Drake. Penn State turned the ball over four times, three fumbles and one interception. The Badgers, led by quarterback Russell Wilson and tailback Montee Ball, were able to convert all four turnovers into scores.

=== January 2 vs. Houston (2012 TicketCity Bowl) ===
	1	2	3	4	Total
#23 Penn State	0	7	7	0	14
#17 Houston	17	7	3	3	30

Penn State lost to Houston 14–30 in the TicketCity Bowl at the Cotton Bowl Stadium in Dallas, Texas to end the season. Houston quarterback, Case Keenum, was the game MVP completing 45 of 69 passes for 532 yards and three touchdowns. Rob Bolden started at quarterback in place of the injured Matt McGloin for Penn State. Bolden, the offense, and the defense struggled throughout the game.

== Awards ==
Penn State's football players were recognized for outstanding academic performance by the New America Foundation's Academic Bowl Championship Series. The team was ranked number one out of the top 25 ranked BCS teams. The criteria in the rankings include the graduation rate of the team as compared to the rest of university, the difference between the graduation rate of African-American players and the rest of the squad as well as the same statistics for the rest of the students at Penn State, and the graduation rate differences between African American players and students. This marked the second time that the football team at Penn State was ranked number one. Chris White was awarded the Ray Guy Award for the nations best Punter. The 2009 team earned the same honor.

=== Watchlists ===
- Anthony Fera
  Lou Groza Award Watch List
  Ray Guy Award Candidate
- Michael Mauti
  Bronko Nagurski Trophy Watch List
  Butkus Award Watch List
- Derek Moye
  Fred Biletnikoff Award Watch List
- Nate Stupar
  Lowe's Senior CLASS Award candidate
- Devon Still
  Chuck Bednarik Award Finalist
  Outland Trophy Finalist

=== Players ===
- Drew Astorino
  Honorable-mention All-Big Ten
  Ridge Riley Award (senior) for "sportsmanship, scholarship, leadership and friendship"
  Academic All-Big Ten
- Quinn Barham
  Honorable-mention All-Big Ten
  Richard Maginnis Memorial Award (outstanding offensive lineman)
  Academic All-Big Ten
- Bardley Bars
  Academic All-Big Ten
- Brandon Beachum
  Academic All-Big Ten
- Glen Carson (American football)
  Academic All-Big Ten
- Jack Crawford
  Second-team All-Big Ten (coaches)
  Quarterback Club Special Award
- Mike Farrell
  Academic All-Big Ten
- Anthony Fera
  Big Ten Special Teams Player of the Week (Oct. 3)
  Big Ten Special Teams Player of the Week (Oct. 17)
  Big Ten Special Teams Player of the Week (Nov. 21)
  Second-team All-Big Ten (media)
- Jordan Hill
  Honorable-mention All-Big Ten
- Gerald Hodges
  Big Ten Defensive Player of the Week (Oct. 24)
  Big Ten Defensive Player of the Week (Oct. 31)
  All-Big Ten (coaches)
  Second-team All-Big Ten (media)
- Ty Howie
  Academic All-Big Ten
- Mike Hull
  Academic All-Big Ten
- Evan Lewis
  Academic All-Big Ten
- D'Anton Lynn
  Honorable-mention All-Big Ten
- J.D. Mason
  Academic All-Big Ten
- Matt McGloin
  Big Ten Co-Offensive Player of the Week (Sept. 26)
- Shane McGregor
  Jim Murray Memorial Foundation Scholar
- Derek Moye
  Honorable-mention All-Big Ten
  Quarterback Club Special Award
- Chima Okoli
  Honorable-mention All-Big Ten
  Academic All-Big Ten
- Ken Pollock
  Academic All-Big Ten
- Chaz Powell
  Big Ten Co-Special Teams Player of the Week (Sept. 5)
  Honorable-mention All-Big Ten
  John Bruno, Jr. Memorial Award (outstanding member of special teams)
- Silas Redd
  Second-team All-Big Ten (consensus)
- Jon Rohrbaugh
  Outstanding Walk-on Award (walk-on player who exemplifies total commitment, loyalty, hard work and courage)
  Academic All-Big Ten
- Ryan Scherer
  The Nittany Lion Club Academic Achievement Award (senior with highest GPA)
  Academic All-Big Ten
- Matt Stankiewitch
  Academic All-Big Ten
- Devon Still
  Big Ten Defensive Player of the Year
  Big Ten Defensive Lineman of the Year
  All-Big Ten (consensus)
  Penn State team MVP
  Associated Press All-American
  AT&T/ESPN All-American
  CBSSports.com All-American
  Football Writers Association of America All-American
  Foxsportsnet.com All-American
  Pro Football Weekly All-American
  SI.com All-American
  Walter Camp Football Foundation All-American
  Yahoo! Sports All-American
- Nate Stupar
  Honorable-mention All-Big Ten
  Quarterback Club Special Award
  Academic All-Big Ten
- Joe Suhey
  Academic All-Big Ten
- Nick Sukay
  Second-team All-Big Ten (consensus)
  2012 East–West Shrine Game defensive MVP
- Andrew Szczerba
  Robert B. Mitinger, Jr. Award (senior who exhibits courage, character and social responsibility)
  Quarterback Club Special Award
- Johnnie Troutman
  Honorable-mention All-Big Ten
  Richard Maginnis Memorial Award (outstanding offensive lineman)
- John Urschel
  Capital One Academic All-District
  Academic All-Big Ten
- James Van Fleet
  Academic All-Big Ten

== Post-season ==
Seven players were invited to the 2012 NFL Scouting Combine, held February 22 to 28 at Lucas Oil Stadium in Indianapolis, Indiana: Jack Crawford, D'Anton Lynn, Derek Moye, Chaz Powell, Devon Still, Nate Stupar, Johnnie Troutman.

=== All-star games ===
Game	Date	Site	Players
2012 Casino del Sol College All-Star Game	January 16, 2012	Kino Veterans Memorial Stadium; Tucson, Arizona	Drew Astorino; Quinn Barham; Stephfon Green
2012 East-West Shrine Game	January 21, 2012	Tropicana Field; St. Petersburg, Florida	Nick Sukay
2012 Astroturf NFLPA Collegiate Bowl	January 21, 2012	The Home Depot Center; Carson, California	Jon Rohrbaugh; Andrew Szczerba
2012 Senior Bowl	January 28, 2012	Ladd–Peebles Stadium, Mobile, Alabama	Devon Still; Jack Crawford; D'Anton Lynn; Johnnie Troutman
