= Andrew Szczerba =

American football player (born 1988)

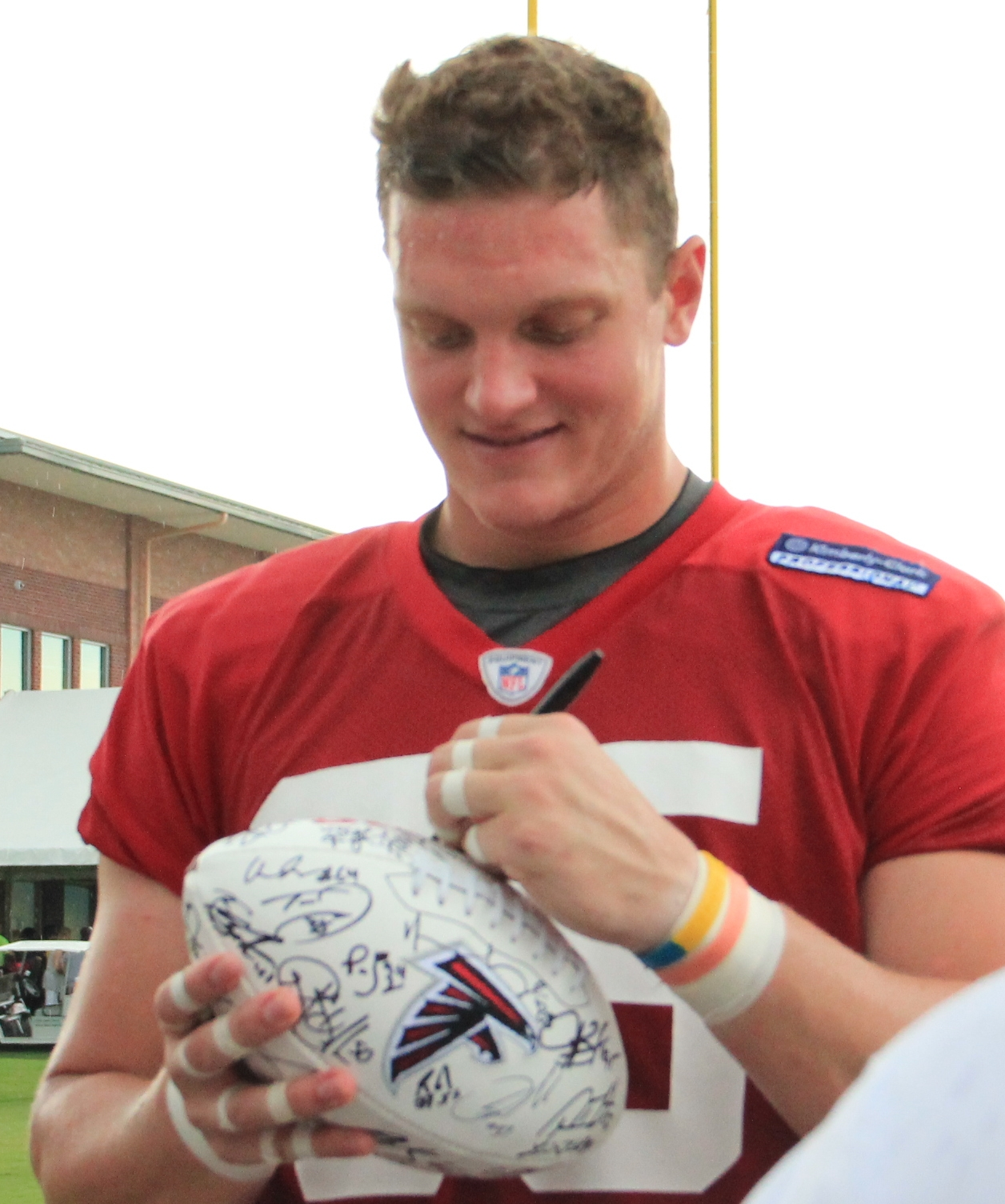
- Andrew Szczerba in 2013

No. 80, 85
- Position: Tight end

Personal information
- Born: July 16, 1988 (age 38); Wilmington, Delaware, U.S.
- Listed height: 6 ft 6 in (1.98 m)
- Listed weight: 256 lb (116 kg)

Career information
- High school: Salesianum School (Wilmington, Delaware)
- College: Penn State
- NFL draft: 2012: undrafted

Career history
- Dallas Cowboys (2012)*; Atlanta Falcons (2012–2014)
- * Offseason or practice squad member only
- Stats at Pro Football Reference

Andrew Joseph Szczerba (born July 16, 1988) is an American former football tight end. He was a member of the Penn State Nittany Lions college football team for five seasons, but only played in three due to injury. After a senior college football season in which he faced adversity with the killing of his uncle, Szczerba signed with the Dallas Cowboys as an undrafted free agent after the 2012 NFL draft. After the Cowboys released him, he signed with the Atlanta Falcons and was a member of the Falcons' practice squad during the second half of the 2012 NFL season.

== Early life ==
Szczerba was born on July 16, 1988, in Wilmington, Delaware, to parents Edward and Florence (McCorkle) Szczerba. He and his fraternal twin, Julianna, are the youngest of five children. He attended Salesianum School and played football there leading his team to two state championships in 2005 and 2006 and playing both tight end and defensive end. Szczerba was selected the 2006 Gatorade Player-of-the-Year in Delaware and earned first-team all state honors both offensively and defensively.

Szczerba comes from a football family background. Ed, his father, was a first-team All-State tight end on Salesianum's 1972 state championship team. His late uncle, Joe Szczerba, played football at Sallies and West Chester University and also has another uncle who played Division I-AA college football.

== College career ==
=== Recruiting ===
College recruiting
Name	Hometown	School	Height	Weight	40^{‡}	Commit date
Andrew Szczerba; TE	Wilmington, Delaware	Salesianum School	6 ft 6 in (1.98 m)	265 lb (120 kg)	4.8	Aug 13, 2006
Andrew Szczerba; TE	Recruit ratings: Scout: Rivals:					
Overall recruit ranking:
‡ Refers to 40-yard dash; Note: In many cases, Scout, Rivals, 247Sports, On3, and ESPN may conflict in their listings of height, weight and 40 time.; In these cases, the average was taken. ESPN grades are on a 100-point scale.; Sources: "2007 Team Ranking". Rivals.com.

Penn State linebackers coach Ron Vanderlinden was Szczerba's primary recruiter. He also received offers from eventual Penn State head coach Bill O'Brien while O'Brien was an assistant at Duke, as well as from Maryland, Virginia Tech, and University of Virginia. He committed to play for the Nittany Lions on August 13, 2006.

=== Penn State ===
Szczerba attended Penn State University and played football under head coaches Joe Paterno and Tom Bradley during his five seasons with the program. After redshirting his freshman season, he appeared in every game during Penn State's 2008 and 2009 seasons. He was primarily a contributor on special teams. After missing his junior season due to a back injury, there were expectations that Szczerba would have a successful senior season. During his senior season, however, he faced adversity. On September 16, 2011, Szczerba's uncle, a New Castle County police officer, was killed in the line of duty while trying to apprehend a suspect in New Castle, Delaware. Even so, Szczerba did not miss any playing time, but commented that he was "taking it day by day".

== Professional career ==
Szczerba went undrafted in the 2012 NFL draft, and signed a free agent contract with the Dallas Cowboys. Despite a solid training camp, the Cowboys cut Szczerba on August 31, 2012, during final roster cuts. The Atlanta Falcons signed him to their practice squad on November 13, 2012, and he re-signed with the Falcons to a reserve/future contract on January 21, 2013. He was waived on June 11, 2014.
