= 2012 TicketCity Bowl =

- TicketCity Bowl logo
Houston Cougars	Penn State Nittany Lions
(12–1)	(9–3)
C-USA	Big Ten
30	14
Head coach: Tony Levine (interim)	Head coach: Tom Bradley (interim)
AP / Coaches / BCS; 20 / 17 / 19	AP / Coaches / BCS; 24 / 23 / 22
	1	2	3	4	Total
Houston	17	7	3	3	30
Penn State	0	7	7	0	14
- Date: January 2, 2012
- Season: 2011
- Stadium: Cotton Bowl
- Location: Dallas, Texas
- MVP: Case Keenum (QB, Houston)
- Favorite: Houston by 6
- Referee: Jeff Maconaghy (Big East)
- Attendance: 46,817
- Payout: US$1.2 million per team

United States TV coverage
- Network: ESPNU
- Announcers: Clay Matvick (Play-by-Play); Danny Kanell (Analyst); Lisa Salters (Sidelines)
- Nielsen ratings: 0.9

The 2012 TicketCity Bowl, the second edition of the game, was a post-season American college football bowl game, held on January 2, 2012, at the Cotton Bowl in Dallas, Texas, as one of the 2011–12 NCAA football bowl games.

The game, which was telecast at 11:00 a.m. CT on ESPNU, featured the Houston Cougars from Conference USA versus the Penn State Nittany Lions from the Big Ten Conference. The Houston Cougars won, 30–14.

The 2012 TicketCity Bowl marked the head coaching debut of Tony Levine, and the last college game of quarterback Case Keenum.
