= Derek Moye =

American football player (born 1988)

No. 14
- Position: Wide receiver

Personal information
- Born: August 12, 1988 (age 38); Rochester, Pennsylvania, U.S.
- Listed height: 6 ft 5 in (1.96 m)
- Listed weight: 210 lb (95 kg)

Career information
- High school: Rochester Area
- College: Penn State
- NFL draft: 2012: undrafted

Career history
- Miami Dolphins (2012)*; New Orleans Saints (2012)*; Pittsburgh Steelers (2012–2014); Tennessee Titans (2014–2015)*
- * Offseason or practice squad member only

Career NFL statistics
- Receptions: 2
- Receiving yards: 20
- Receiving touchdowns: 1
- Stats at Pro Football Reference

Derek Robert Moye (born August 12, 1988) is an American former professional football player who was a wide receiver in the National Football League (NFL). After playing college football for the Penn State Nittany Lions, he was signed by the Miami Dolphins as an undrafted free agent in 2012.

== Early life ==
Moye attended Rochester Area High School in Rochester, Pennsylvania, where he was a four-sport standout. In football, he gained over 3100 rushing and receiving yards combined in his junior and senior seasons and scored 53 touchdowns. He was recruited to Penn State by Tom Bradley and committed in January 2007. He also earned first-team All-section honors in basketball and baseball.

In track & field, Moye was one of the state's top sprinters. He recorded a career-best time of 11.04 seconds in the 100-meter dash at the 2006 Pennsylvania T&F State Championships, where he took 7th in the finals. He won the 200-meter dash (22.04 s) and 400-meter dash (48.04 s) Class AA state titles at the 2007 Pennsylvania T&F State Championships.

== College career ==
Moye entered the 2009 season starting at wide receiver. Since he redshirted his freshman season, Moye was an academic Junior with Sophomore eligibility. He finished his sophomore eligibility year with 48 receptions for 785 yards. Moye finished his junior year with 53 catches for 885 yards with a 16.7 yards per catch average and 8 touchdowns. For his senior year, he was elected captain and had 40 receptions for 654 yards with 3 touchdowns.

In his career, he had 144 receptions for 2,395 yards and 18 touchdowns. He is the seventh all-time leading receiver at Penn State.

== Professional career ==
=== 2012 NFL draft ===
Pre-draft measurables
Height	Weight	40-yard dash	10-yard split	20-yard split	20-yard shuttle	Three-cone drill	Vertical jump	Broad jump	Bench press
6 ft 4 in (1.93 m)	209 lb (95 kg)	4.44 s	1.56 s	2.63 s	4.23 s	6.96 s	33 1/2 in (0.85 m)	9 ft 7 in (2.92 m)	10 reps
Measurables are from NFL Combine and Pro Day

After going undrafted in the 2012 NFL draft, Moye signed a free agent deal with the Miami Dolphins. He was waived on June 12, 2012, and the New Orleans Saints claimed him off waivers on June 13. On November 7, 2012, the Pittsburgh Steelers added him to the practice squad. On December 5, 2012, the Steelers released Moye, however, they re-signed him to the practice squad on December 12, 2012. The Steelers brought Moye back for the 2013 preseason and he performed well, leading the team with 10 catches and 149 yards. In the 4th and final pre-season game, an errant pass intended for Moye was intercepted by Carolina Panthers defensive back Josh Norman at Carolina's 8-yard line; Moye ran the length of the field and made a spectacular tackle. Some felt this effort and determination in the final preseason game helped him secure the fifth and final WR spot on the 53 man roster.

Moye caught the first touchdown of his professional career in Week 2 of the 2013 season, during Pittsburgh's 20-10 loss to the Cincinnati Bengals on Monday Night Football.

He was signed to the Tennessee Titans practice squad on October 22, 2014.
