= Silas Redd =

American football and rugby league player (born 1992)

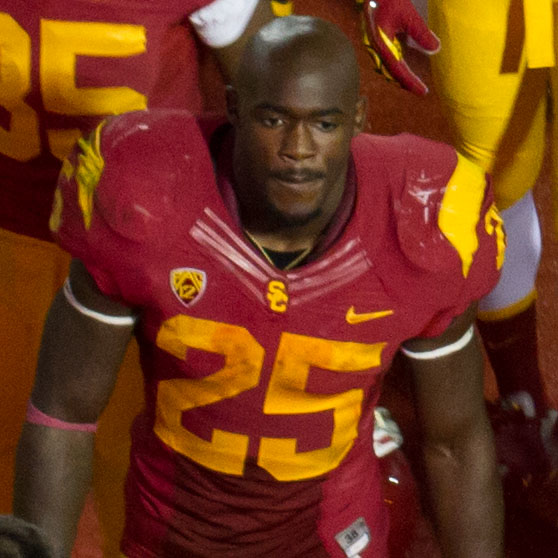
- Redd with the USC Trojans in 2012

No. 32
- Position: Running back

Personal information
- Born: March 1, 1992 (age 34); Norwalk, Connecticut, U.S.
- Listed height: 5 ft 10 in (1.78 m)
- Listed weight: 200 lb (91 kg)

Career information
- High school: King Low Heywood Thomas (Stamford, Connecticut)
- College: Penn State (2010–2011); USC (2012–2013)
- NFL draft: 2014: undrafted

Career history
- Washington Redskins (2014–2016)

Awards and highlights
- Second-team All-Big Ten (2011)

Career NFL statistics
- Rushing attempts: 16
- Rushing yards: 75
- Rushing touchdowns: 1
- Receptions: 8
- Receiving yards: 107
- Stats at Pro Football Reference

Silas Raynard Redd Jr. (born March 1, 1992) is an American former professional football player who was a running back in the National Football League (NFL). He played college football for the Penn State Nittany Lions and USC Trojans, and was signed as an undrafted free agent by the Washington Redskins in 2014.

Redd was signed to play rugby league for the Ipswich Jets in the Australian Intrust Super Cup in 2018, but did not play in any league games for the team.

== Early life ==
Redd played in the 2010 U.S. Army All-American Bowl.

Redd attended King School, a private, co-ed college preparatory school in preparatory Stamford, Connecticut alongside NFL linebacker Kevin Pierre-Louis who was his teammate on the school's football team.

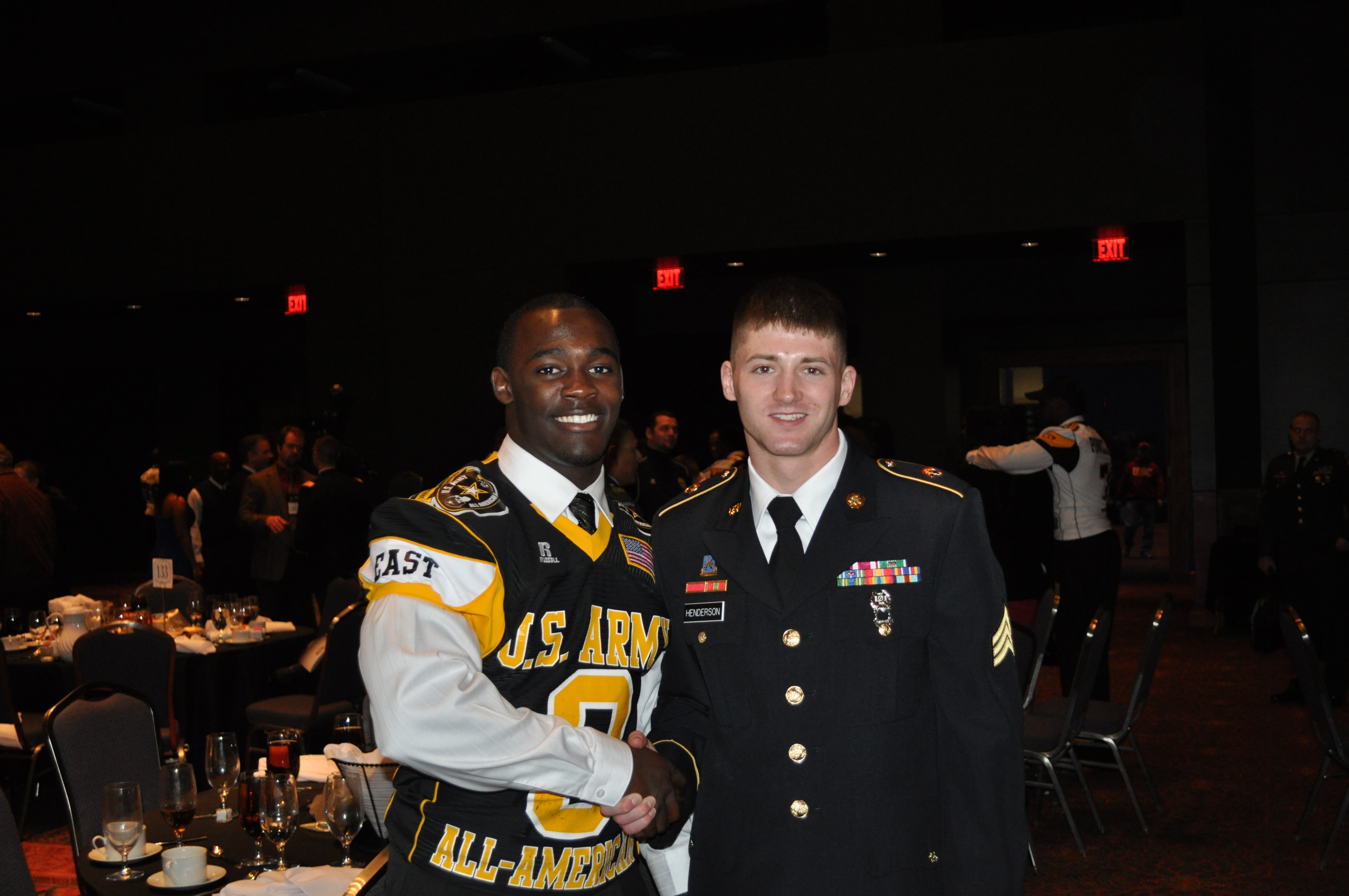
Redd at the Army All-American Bowl awards dinner in 2010

== College career ==
Redd served as a backup in 2010, and became Penn State's lead running back in 2011. He rushed for 1,188 yards in the 2011 regular season, third most in the Big Ten Conference and 22nd most among all NCAA Football Bowl Subdivision players. He ranked 28th in the Football Bowl Subdivision in rushing yards per game.

Redd rushed for 100 or more yards in six of 12 games for Penn State in 2011, including a career-high 164 yards against Northwestern on October 22, 2011.

On July 31, 2012, Redd announced he would transfer to USC in the wake of NCAA sanctions levied against the Nittany Lions football program that gave players an opportunity to transfer to another major program without sitting out a year. Redd practiced with the Trojans for the first time on August 6. He finished his first year with 905 rushing yards and nine touchdowns.

Redd remained at USC for his senior season. He played in six games, rushing for 376 yards with one touchdown.

=== Statistics ===
		Rushing				Receiving			
Season	Team	Att	Yards	Avg	TD	Rec	Yards	Avg	TD
2010	Penn State Nittany Lions	77	437	5.7	2	4	27	6.7	0
2011	Penn State Nittany Lions	244	1,241	5.1	7	9	40	4.4	0
2012	USC Trojans	167	905	5.4	9	9	113	12.6	1
2013	USC Trojans	81	376	4.6	1	10	45	4.5	1
Career		569	2,959	5.2	19	32	225	7.0	2

== Professional career ==
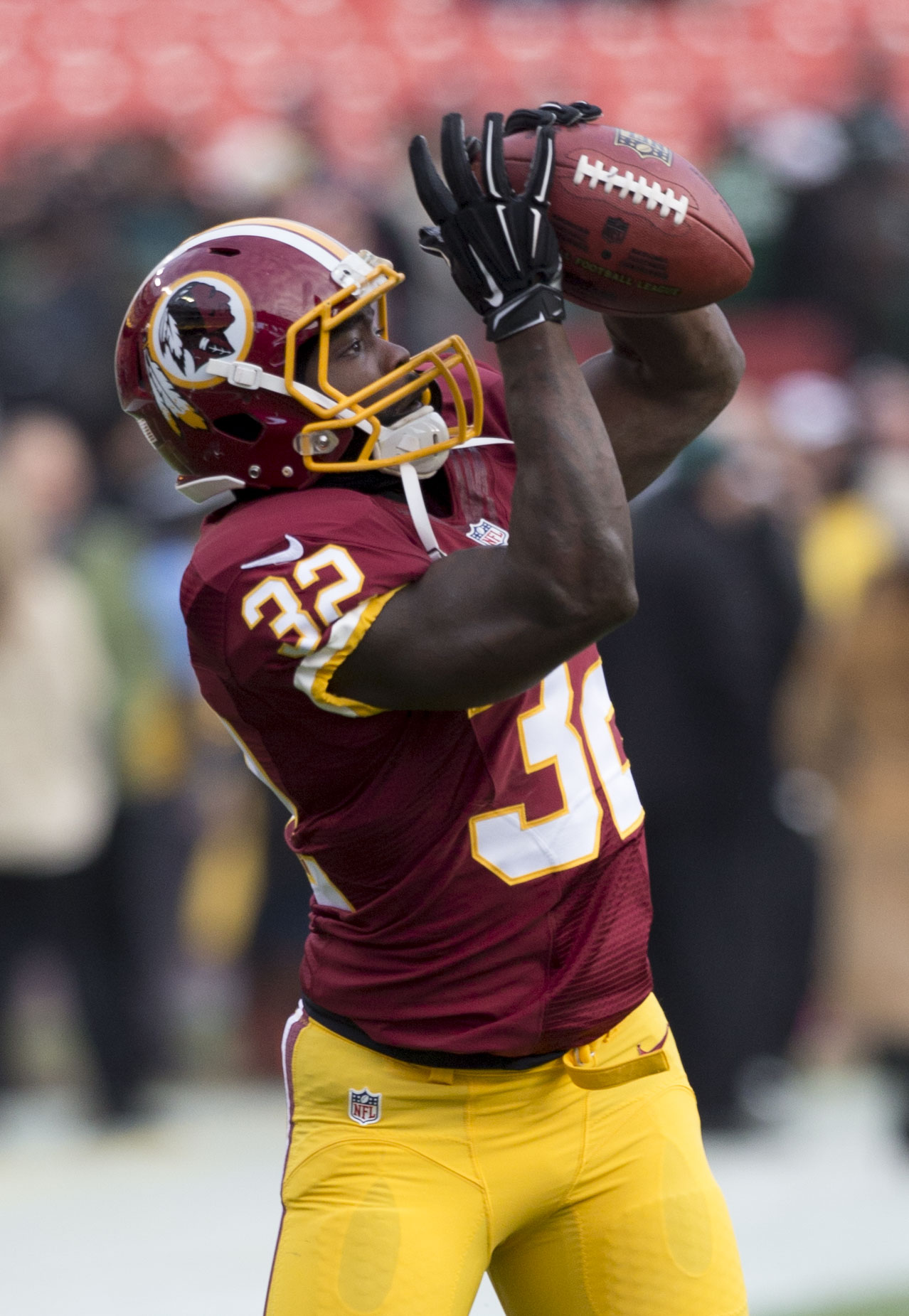
Redd in a game against the Philadelphia Eagles on December 20, 2014

Pre-draft measurables
Height	Weight	Arm length	Hand span	40-yard dash	Vertical jump	Broad jump	Bench press
5 ft 10 in (1.78 m)	212 lb (96 kg)	30 3/4 in (0.78 m)	9 in (0.23 m)	4.70 s	37.0 in (0.94 m)	10 ft 2 in (3.10 m)	18 reps
All values from NFL Combine.

Redd was signed by the Washington Redskins on May 10, 2014, as an undrafted free agent. Despite being undrafted, Redd made the Redskins' final 53-man roster on August 30 beating out Evan Royster, Lache Seastrunk and Chris Thompson for the third-string running back spot. In the 41–10 win in Week 2 against the Jacksonville Jaguars, he recorded his first career touchdown.

Redd tore his right-anterior cruciate ligament (ACL) and medial collateral ligament (MCL) in the first 2015 preseason game against the Cleveland Browns. On August 16, 2015, he was waived/injured. After going unclaimed, he was placed on injured reserve. On November 18, 2015, the NFL suspended him for four games, without pay, for violating the league's substance-abuse policy. On April 12, 2016, Redd was suspended indefinitely for another violation of the substance-abuse policy.

He was waived by the Redskins on December 27, 2016, after being reinstated from suspension.

== Rugby league career ==
In October 2017, Redd signed on to play rugby league with the professional Ipswich Jets of the Queensland Cup for the 2018 season. He played in one off-season exhibition match in Hawaii between the Jets and the Tweed Heads Seagulls. In May 2018, Redd returned to the USA without playing a game in the Queensland Cup.
