= Phil Steele =

American sportswriter and analyst

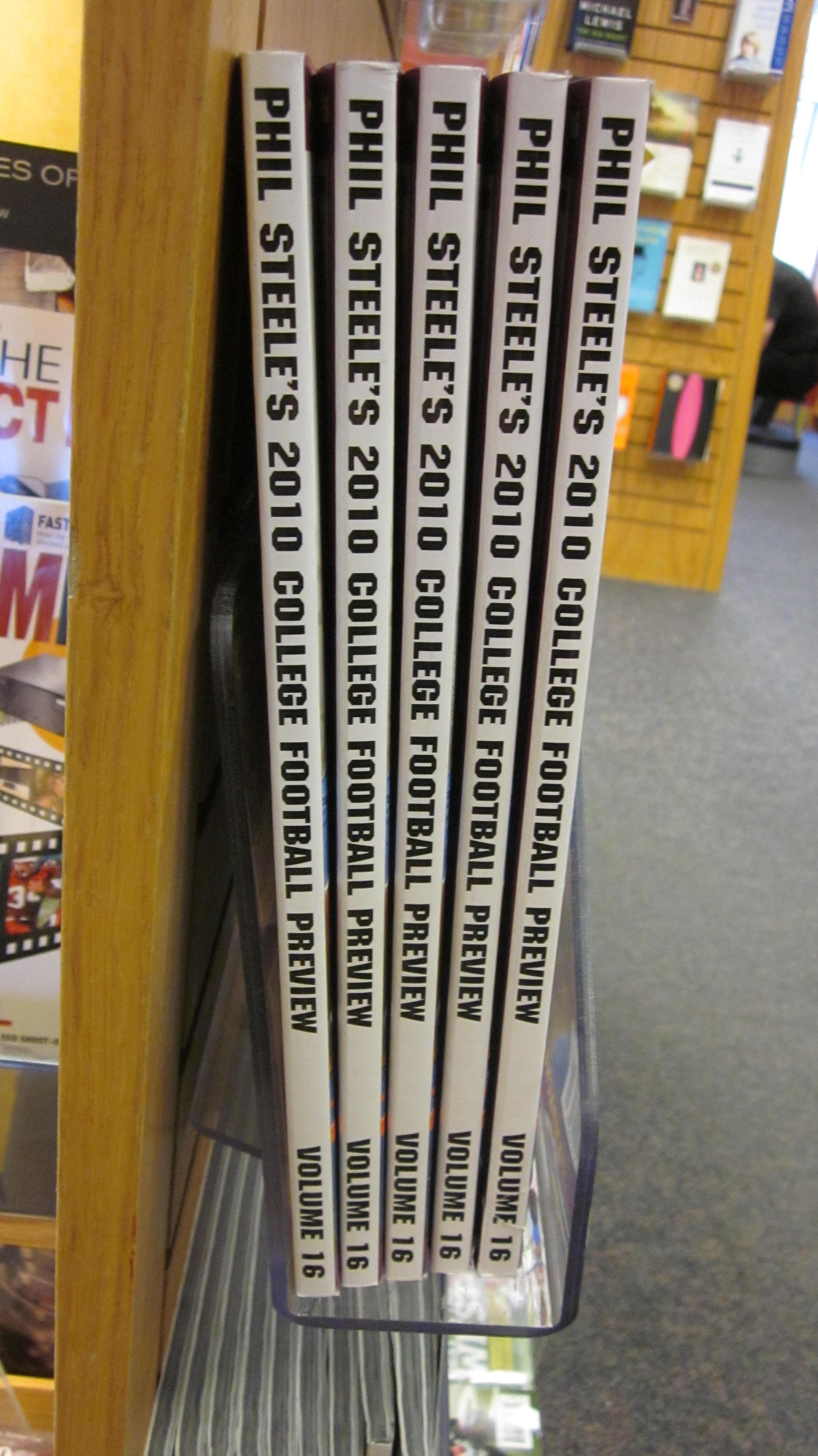
Copies of Phil Steele's 2010 College Football Preview at Borders in San Francisco, California

Phil Steele (c. 1960) is an American sportswriter and analyst who focuses exclusively on college and professional football. He is considered a "highly respected prognosticator" within the sports media. His company, Phil Steele Publications, produces the annual preseason magazine Phil Steele's College Football Preview, which he personally writes in almost its entirety. The first edition was published in 1995. In a comparison of the major preseason college football magazines, ESPN writer Pat Forde said:

All the mags have their merits . . . But Phil Steele owns the genre . . . The 46-year-old uses a cookie-cutter layout for every team, and his writing will never be nominated for a Pulitzer. But he does author every two-page team preview himself, and he crams stats, facts and figures into every nook and cranny.

The magazine was similarly praised by the News & Observer and Rivals.com. Chris Stassen, owner of football.stassen.com, has tracked the preseason magazines' accuracy since 1993 and rates Phil Steele's as the most accurate in its predictions. Phil was a full-time employee of ESPN for three years writing articles for ESPN+ and appearing on SportsCenter. He continues to produce the "Bible of College Football" which is the Phil Steele College Football preview that is now in its 31st year.

Steele is a member of the Football Writers Association of America All American Team, Heisman Trophy, John Mackey Award, Davey O'Brien Award, Lombardi Award, Outland Trophy, Joe Moore Award, Bronko Nagurski Award, Maxwell Award, Chuck Bednarik Award, Jim Thorpe Award, Doak Walker Award, Biletnikoff Award, Lou Groza Award, Paul Hornung Award and the Ted Hendricks Award voting committees.
