= Johnnie Troutman =

American football player (born 1987)

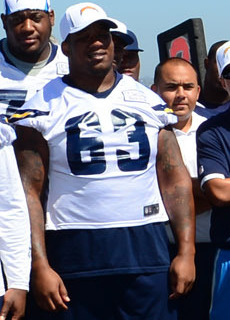
- Troutman in 2013

No. 63
- Position: Guard

Personal information
- Born: November 11, 1987 (age 38); Trenton, New Jersey, U.S.
- Listed height: 6 ft 4 in (1.93 m)
- Listed weight: 325 lb (147 kg)

Career information
- High school: Pemberton Township (Pemberton, New Jersey)
- College: Penn State
- NFL draft: 2012: 5th round, 149th overall pick

Career history
- San Diego Chargers (2012–2015)

Career NFL statistics
- Games played: 29
- Games started: 24
- Stats at Pro Football Reference

Johnnie Troutman (born November 11, 1987) is an American former professional football player who was a guard in the National Football League (NFL). Troutman played college football for the Penn State Nittany Lions and was selected by the San Diego Chargers in the fifth round of the 2012 NFL draft. He is credited with having the slowest 40-yard dash time, at 5.76 seconds.

== Early life ==
Troutman attended Pemberton Township High School in Pemberton, New Jersey where he played on both offensive and defensive lines.

== College career ==
Redshirted in 2007, Troutman played at Penn State from 2008 to 2011. He started his last three seasons at left guard for the Nittany Lions without allowing a sack and as a senior in 2011, Troutman did not commit a single penalty. Troutman graduated in May 2011 with a degree in African-American studies. He is a charter member of the Eta Alpha chapter of Iota Phi Theta fraternity.

== Professional career ==
The San Diego Chargers selected Troutman with a fifth-round pick (149th overall) in the 2012 NFL draft. He had surgery for a pectoral injury prior to the draft and spent the entire 2012 season on the “Reserve-Non-Football Injury” list. On May 10, signed a four-year, $2.3 million contract. In the 2013 season, Troutman competed for the starting left guard spot. For the 2014 season Troutman was promoted to the starting position at right guard due to Jeromey Clary's hip surgery.

He was placed on season-ending injured reserve due to a forearm injury on September 29.
