= Anthony Fera =

American gridiron football player (born 1991)

No. 30
- Position: Placekicker / Punter

Personal information
- Born: June 18, 1991 (age 35); Philadelphia, Pennsylvania, U.S.
- Listed height: 6 ft 2 in (1.88 m)
- Listed weight: 207 lb (94 kg)

Career information
- High school: St. Pius X (Houston, Texas)
- College: Penn State, Texas
- NFL draft: 2014: undrafted

Career history
- BC Lions (2015); Montreal Alouettes (2016); Hamilton Tiger-Cats (2017)*
- * Offseason or practice squad member only

Awards and highlights
- Consensus All-American (2013); First-team All-Big 12 (2013); Second-team All-Big Ten (2011)
- Stats at Pro Football Reference
- Stats at CFL.ca (archive)

Anthony Fera (born June 18, 1991) is an American former football placekicker and punter.

== Playing career ==
Hailing from Cypress, Texas, Fera attended St. Pius X High School. Fera later attended Penn State, redshirting in 2009. On November 17, 2010, Fera had an emergency appendectomy. In Penn State's 2011 game against Eastern Michigan, Fera became the first Nittany Lion since Chris Bahr in 1975 to be the starter for field goals, kickoffs and punts. After the 2011 season, Fera transferred to Texas. Fera missed the first four games of 2012 with a groin injury. Fera was a finalist for the 2013 Lou Groza Award.

== Professional career ==
After college, Fera signed as a free agent for the BC Lions on May 27, 2015, eventually joining the practice roster on June 20, 2015. He was released by the team on June 3, 2016. He was moved up to the roster and played in the last game of the season, in which he kicked two Field Goals and missed one, all over 40 yards.

On August 9, 2016, Fera was signed by the Montreal Alouettes. He played in 8 games for the Alouettes, connecting on 16 out of 20 field goals and averaging 46.8 yards over 52 punts. At the end of the season he became a free agent and was signed by the Hamilton Tiger-Cats. He was cut a week later.
