= Nate Stupar =

American football player (born 1988)

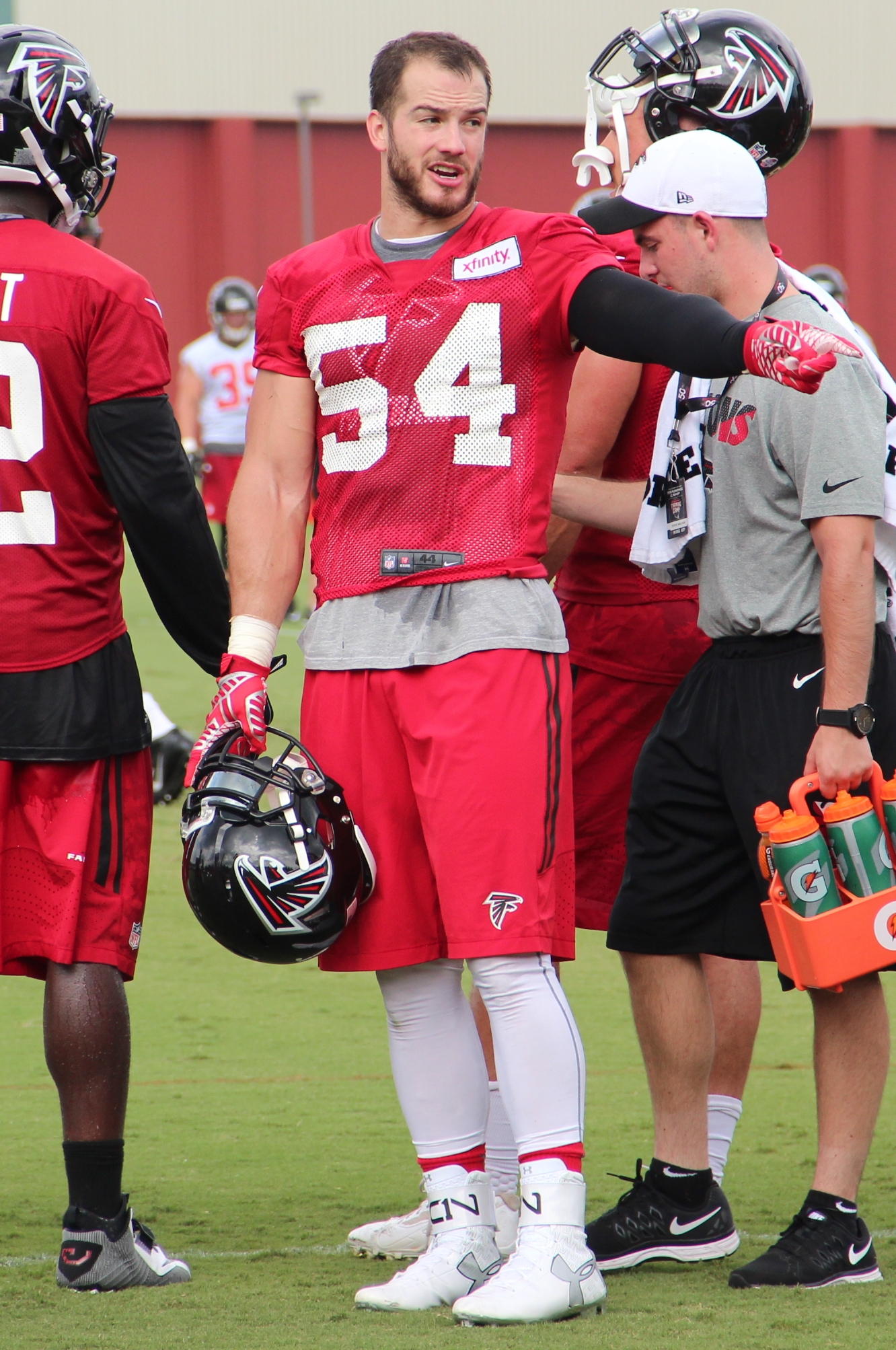
- Stupar with the Atlanta Falcons in 2015

No. 56, 54, 52, 57, 45
- Position: Linebacker

Personal information
- Born: March 14, 1988 (age 38); State College, Pennsylvania, U.S.
- Listed height: 6 ft 2 in (1.88 m)
- Listed weight: 240 lb (109 kg)

Career information
- High school: State College Area
- College: Penn State
- NFL draft: 2012: 7th round, 230th overall pick

Career history
- Oakland Raiders (2012)*; Philadelphia Eagles (2012)*; San Francisco 49ers (2012–2013); Jacksonville Jaguars (2013); Atlanta Falcons (2014–2015); New Orleans Saints (2016–2017); New York Giants (2018–2019)
- * Offseason or practice squad member only

Career NFL statistics
- Total tackles: 138
- Sacks: 2.0
- Forced fumbles: 2
- Fumble recoveries: 3
- Interceptions: 1
- Defensive touchdowns: 1
- Stats at Pro Football Reference

Stephen Nathan Stupar (born March 14, 1988) is an American former professional football player who was a linebacker in the National Football League (NFL). He played college football for Penn State Nittany Lions and was selected by the Oakland Raiders in the seventh round of the 2012 NFL draft.

== College career ==
A native of State College, Pennsylvania, Stupar played at Penn State, where he appeared in 52 games (16 starts) and registered 205 tackles, five sacks, four interceptions, two fumble recoveries, one forced fumble and 12 passes defensed, in his career.

== Professional career ==
=== Oakland Raiders ===
Stupar was selected by the Oakland Raiders in the seventh round of the 2012 NFL draft. He later signed to the team’s practice squad following training camp and later released on September 12, 2012.

=== Philadelphia Eagles ===
Stupar then signed with the Philadelphia Eagles' practice squad on November 19, 2012, and spent the remainder of the regular season with the Eagles.

=== San Francisco 49ers ===
Stupar was signed to the practice squad of the San Francisco 49ers on January 8, 2013. Stupar was released by the 49ers on November 2.

=== Jacksonville Jaguars ===
On November 4, 2013, the Jacksonville Jaguars were awarded Stupar on waivers.

On August 30, 2014, he was released on the final cuts. He had led the Jaguars in tackles during the preseason but was cut in lieu of J. T. Thomas, who is more multi-dimensional and able to play both special teams and all three linebacker positions.

=== Atlanta Falcons ===
On August 31, 2014, the Atlanta Falcons signed Stupar. The Falcons added him to the 53-man roster.

On March 3, 2015, Stupar signed a one-year contract extension with the Falcons. In Week 4 of the 2015 season against the Houston Texans, Stupar scored his first touchdown off a fumble recovery on the last play of the game.

=== New Orleans Saints ===
On March 16, 2016, Stupar signed a three-year, $5 million contract with the New Orleans Saints.

On October 17, 2017, Stupar was placed on injured reserve after tearing his ACL in Week 6.

On September 3, 2018, Stupar was released by the Saints.

=== New York Giants ===
On September 5, 2018, Stupar signed with the New York Giants.

On March 20, 2019, Stupar re-signed with the Giants. He was released on September 6. Stupar filed an injury grievance against the Giants, and reached an amicable settlement with the team. He was re-signed on September 24. He was released on October 14.

== NFL career statistics ==
Legend
	Led the league
**Bold**	Career high

Year	Team	Games		Tackles					Interceptions					Fumbles			
Year	Team	GP	GS	Cmb	Solo	Ast	Sck	TFL	Int	Yds	TD	Lng	PD	FF	FR	Yds	TD
2013	SFO	5	0	5	4	1	0.0	0	0	0	0	0	0	0	0	0	0
2013	JAX	7	0	5	3	2	0.0	0	0	0	0	0	0	0	0	0	0
2014	ATL	15	0	10	8	2	0.0	0	0	0	0	0	0	0	0	0	0
2015	ATL	**16**	3	40	33	7	**1.0**	**1**	0	0	0	0	**2**	0	1	**84**	**1**
2016	NOR	**16**	**6**	**59**	**49**	**10**	**1.0**	**1**	**1**	0	0	0	**2**	**2**	**2**	0	0
2017	NOR	4	0	1	1	0	0.0	0	0	0	0	0	0	0	0	0	0
2018	NYG	**16**	1	14	10	4	0.0	0	0	0	0	0	0	0	0	0	0
2019	NYG	3	1	4	2	2	0.0	0	0	0	0	0	0	0	0	0	0
		82	11	138	110	28	2.0	2	1	0	0	0	4	2	3	84	1

== Personal life ==
Stupar’s older brother, Jonathan, was an American professional football player who was a tight end, who played for the Buffalo Bills from 2009 to 2010. His uncle is retired NFL quarterback and Super Bowl champion, Jeff Hostetler.

Stupar is currently the VP of BD/M for R.H. Marcon, Inc. in State College, PA.
