= Tom Bradley (American football coach) =

American football player and coach (born 1956)

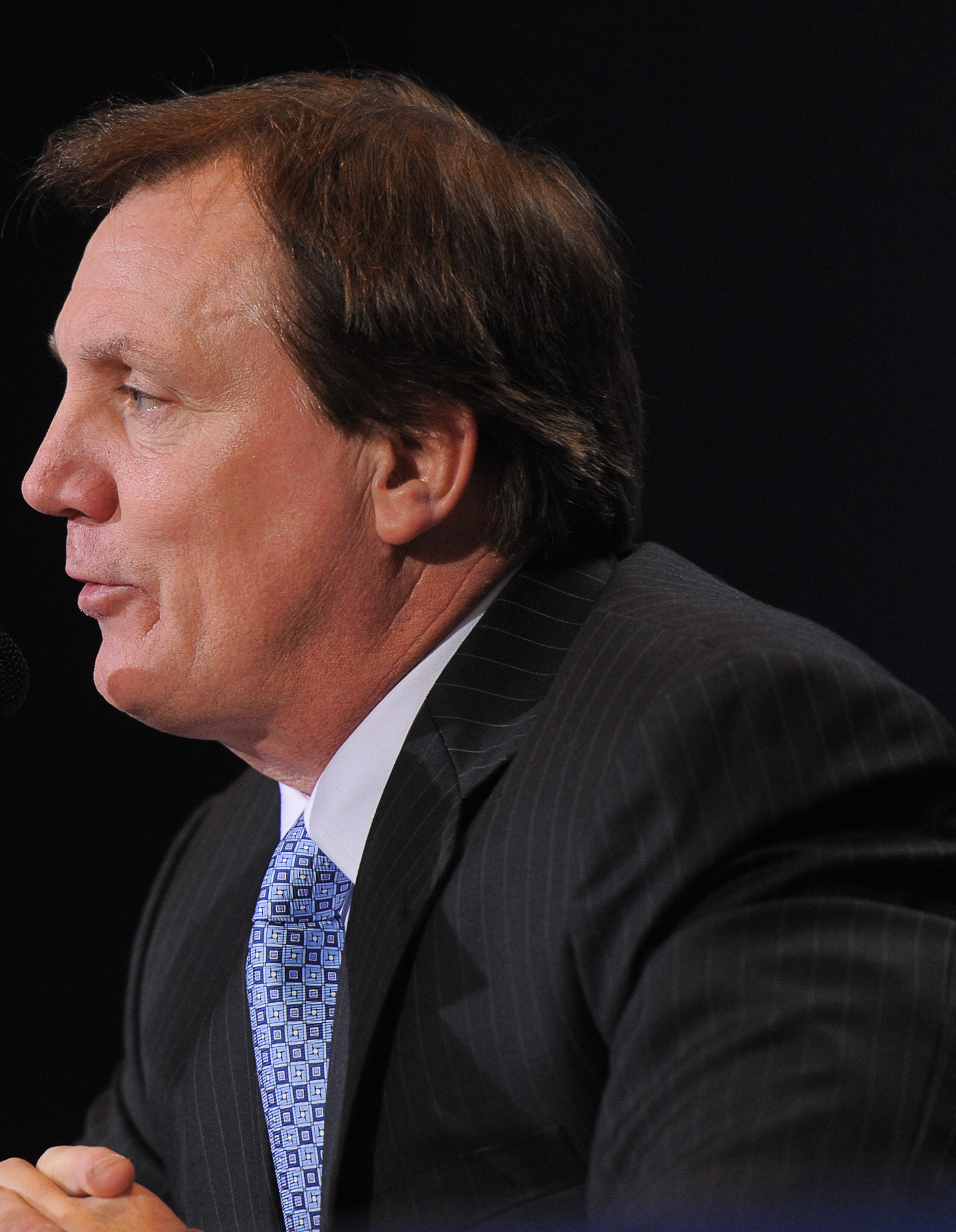
- Bradley in 2011

Personal information
- Born: July 12, 1956 (age 70); Johnstown, Pennsylvania, U.S.

Career information
- College: Penn State

Career history
- Penn State (1979) Graduate assistant; Penn State (1980) Special teams; Penn State (1981–1985) Special teams and wide receivers coach; Penn State (1986–1995) Outside linebackers and special teams; Penn State (1996–1999) Defensive backs; Penn State (2000–2011) Defensive coordinator and cornerbacks; Penn State (2011) Interim head coach; West Virginia (2014) Associate head coach and defensive line; UCLA (2015–2017) Defensive coordinator; Pittsburgh Steelers (2018–2020) Defensive backs

Head coaching record
- Career: 1–3 (.250)

Thomas Mark Bradley (born July 12, 1956) is an American football coach and former collegiate player. He was an assistant coach at Penn State from 1979 to 2011 and served as the interim head coach following Joe Paterno's dismissal due to the Penn State child sex abuse scandal. After leaving Penn State, Bradley was the senior associate head coach of the West Virginia Mountaineers, defensive coordinator for the UCLA Bruins, and defensive backs coach for the Pittsburgh Steelers.

== Playing career ==
Bradley graduated from Bishop McCort High School in Johnstown, Pennsylvania, in 1974, where he played basketball and football. He was a three-year letterman in football and a captain his senior year.

Bradley played for the Penn State Nittany Lions football team from 1975 to 1978 as a defensive back. He was given the nickname "Scrap" by teammates due to his tenacious play. In 1978 the Nittany Lions special teams adopted the name, calling themselves the "Scrap Pack." Fans printed t-shirts and bumper stickers honoring them. Bradley helped lead the Lions to 38–10 record during his playing career, including two Sugar Bowls, a Fiesta Bowl and a Gator Bowl. He received a bachelor's degree in business administration and completed a master's in sports administration, later becoming a full-time coach after graduation.

== Coaching career ==
Bradley was named a graduate assistant for the 1979 season immediately following his graduation from Penn State in 1978. He became a full-time assistant midway through the 1979 season. Over the next 20 years, he coached running backs, wide receivers, defensive backs, linebackers, and special teams. In 1999 Bradley was named defensive coordinator at Penn State.

Bradley was a highly successful recruiter in addition to his role defensively. He served as lead recruiter for Nittany Lions such as Shane Conlan, Lavar Arrington, Paul Posluszny, Sean Lee, Brandon Short, and Justin King. Bradley has coached many All-American and all Big Ten standouts including Lavar Arrington, Paul Posluszny, Dan Connor, Devon Still, Shane Conlan, and David Macklin. Bradley was a part of 31 Bowl Games at Penn State.

Through the years Bradley remained loyal to Penn State and Paterno, and it was widely rumored that Paterno was preparing him to be his successor. Bradley's feelings about coaching at Penn State or another school have been quoted, "there's a lot of loyalty that has been built up over the years. There's a family atmosphere between the staff, the players, and the community. It's a place that means a lot to my family. I don't want to go be a head coach just to say I've been a head coach. That's never been part of it. If I find something better, I'll go. But I haven't found it. It's that simple." Bradley was named the Associated Press Defensive Coordinator of the Year in 2005. and was named Rivals.Com Defensive Coordinator of the Year in 2008.

In January 2011, Bradley was reported to have been interviewed as a candidate for the head coaching openings at the University of Pittsburgh, and Temple University, but ultimately remained on Penn State's staff for 2011. On November 9, 2011, Bradley was named Penn State's interim head coach after the university's board of trustees fired Paterno. He coached Penn State for the final four games of the season, including the 2012 TicketCity Bowl.

On January 7, 2012, Bradley resigned from the Penn State coaching staff after not being named head coach, having spent 37 years at Penn State as a player, graduate assistant and full-time assistant.

Bradley spent two years as the football color analyst for CBS Sports before being hired by West Virginia University's Dana Holgorsen as senior associate head coach on February 21, 2014. Bradley coached the defensive line, specifically.

On February 23, 2015, Bradley was hired to be the defensive coordinator for the UCLA Bruins.

On February 8, 2018, Bradley was hired to be the defensive backs coach for the Pittsburgh Steelers.

On January 14, 2021, the Pittsburgh Steelers announced that they wouldn't renew Bradley's contract.

== Personal life ==
Bradley is the second-oldest of seven children. His father, Sam, played basketball for the University of Pittsburgh. His older brother Jim was a captain and standout defensive back at Penn State from 1971 to 1974, played for the Cincinnati Bengals, and is the long-time team orthopedic surgeon for the Pittsburgh Steelers. His younger brother Matt played linebacker for the Nittany Lions from 1978 to 1981. Matt briefly played for the Houston Oilers and the Philadelphia Stars of the USFL. Bradley's nephew, Jim Kanuch, also played receiver at Penn State from 2002 to 2005. His two sisters Patty and Cassy were All-American track athletes at Villanova.

== Honors ==
Bradley was inducted into the Cambria County Hall of Fame in 1998, and served as the honorary chair of the Special Olympics in 2006. He was inducted into the Western Pennsylvania Sports Hall of Fame in May 2014, and is a member of the 2020 Pennsylvania Sports Hall of Fame class. He was also inducted into the Pittsburgh Athletic Association Hall of Fame in January 2015, where he is one of only four collegiate football coaches to receive this honor.

== Head coaching record ==
Year	Team	Overall	Conference	Standing	Bowl/playoffs
Penn State Nittany Lions (Big Ten Conference) (2011)
2011	Penn State	1–3 (Note: Joe Paterno coached the first nine games of the season before he was fired on November 9.)	1–2	T–1st (Leaders)	L TicketCity
Penn State:		1–3	1–2		
Total:		1–3			
National championship Conference title Conference division title or championship game berth
