= Devon Still =

American football player (born 1989)

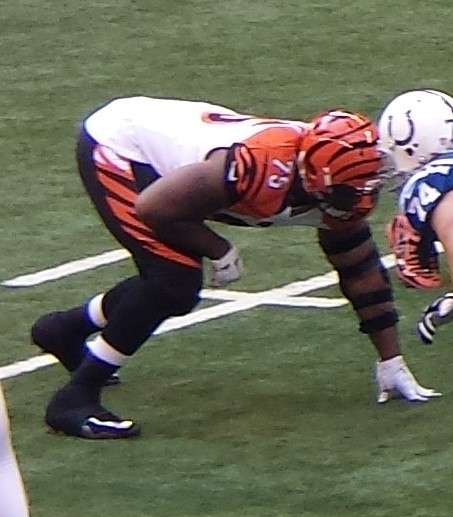
- Still with the Cincinnati Bengals in 2014

No. 75, 91
- Position: Defensive end

Personal information
- Born: July 11, 1989 (age 37); Camden, New Jersey, U.S.
- Listed height: 6 ft 5 in (1.96 m)
- Listed weight: 305 lb (138 kg)

Career information
- High school: Howard (Wilmington, Delaware)
- College: Penn State (2008–2011)
- NFL draft: 2012: 2nd round, 53rd overall pick

Career history
- Cincinnati Bengals (2012–2014); Houston Texans (2016); New York Jets (2017)*
- * Offseason or practice squad member only

Awards and highlights
- Consensus All-American (2011); Big Ten Defensive Player of the Year (2011); Big Ten Defensive Lineman of the Year (2011); First-team All-Big Ten (2011)

Career NFL statistics
- Total tackles: 43
- Sacks: 0.5
- Forced fumbles: 1
- Stats at Pro Football Reference

Devon Joshua Still (born July 11, 1989) is an American former professional football player who was a defensive end in the National Football League (NFL). He played college football for the Penn State Nittany Lions, earning consensus All-American honors. Still was selected by the Cincinnati Bengals in the second round of the 2012 NFL draft. He was also a member of the Houston Texans and New York Jets.

== Early life ==
Still was born in Camden, New Jersey. He attended Howard High School of Technology in Wilmington, Delaware, where he was a standout lineman for the Howard Wildcats high school football team. Still was a team captain during his senior season, recorded 59 tackles, 18 of them for a loss, and was recognized as the Lineman of the Year by the Delaware Interscholastic Coaches Association. He also was a member of the Howard Wildcats basketball and track and field teams.

== College career ==
Still attended Penn State, where he played for coach Joe Paterno's Penn State Nittany Lions football team from 2008 to 2011. He was named the 2011 Big Ten Defensive Player of the Year, becoming only the second defensive tackle to win the award (along with former teammate Jared Odrick). He was also named Big Ten Defensive Lineman of the Year, consensus All-Big Ten, and to 10 first-team All-American teams. He was a finalist for both the Outland and Bednarik awards. Still was elected a team captain for the Nittany Lions as a senior in 2011. He is a charter member of the Eta Alpha chapter of Iota Phi Theta fraternity. He graduated with a degree in Criminal Law and Justice. The Delaware Sportswriters and Broadcasters Association named him Delaware's Outstanding Athlete of 2011.

== Professional career ==
Pre-draft measurables
| Height | Weight | Arm length | Hand span | Wingspan | 40-yard dash | 10-yard split | 20-yard split | 20-yard shuttle | Three-cone drill | Vertical jump | Bench press |
|---|---|---|---|---|---|---|---|---|---|---|---|
| 6 ft 4 7/8 in (1.95 m) | 303 lb (137 kg) | 33 1/4 in (0.84 m) | 10 in (0.25 m) | 6 ft 8 1/4 in (2.04 m) | 4.94 s | 1.78 s | 2.84 s | 4.65 s | 7.70 s | 29.5 in (0.75 m) | 26 reps |
All values from NFL Combine/Pro Day

=== Cincinnati Bengals ===
At the 2012 NFL draft, Still was selected in the second round by the Cincinnati Bengals, with the 53rd overall selection. He played two seasons with the team before being cut in late August 2014, prior to the start of the season. The following day, the Bengals re-signed Still to the practice squad to help him pay for his daughter's cancer treatment.

In addition to his daughter Leah's diagnosis, Still was also attempting to heal from a hamstring injury. He admitted that the injury was holding him back from his full ability and he could not give his best effort to his team. Consequently, Still did not make the Cincinnati Bengals' 53-man roster. Still said: "I completely understand where they were coming from...."I can't give football 100 percent right now. In the business aspect they want guys to solely focus on football, which is understandable. We are here to win this city a Super Bowl and right now I am not in a position where I can give football 100 percent of everything I have." Head coach Marvin Lewis offered Still a position on the practice squad so that he could continue to pay for his daughter's cancer treatments. As a member of the practice squad, Still did not have to travel with the team on road trips.

On September 10, 2014, it was announced that Still would be moved to the active roster. In the game that followed, the Bengals' second of the season, he recorded three tackles against the Atlanta Falcons.

On September 5, 2015, Still was waived by the Bengals.

=== Houston Texans ===
On January 6, 2016, the Houston Texans signed Still to a reserve future contract. He was placed on injured reserve on October 5, 2016.

=== New York Jets ===
On August 4, 2017, Still signed with the New York Jets. He was waived on August 28, 2017.

On December 23, 2017, Still announced his retirement from the NFL.

== Other ==
He was inducted into the Delaware Sports Hall of Fame in 2022.

== Personal life ==
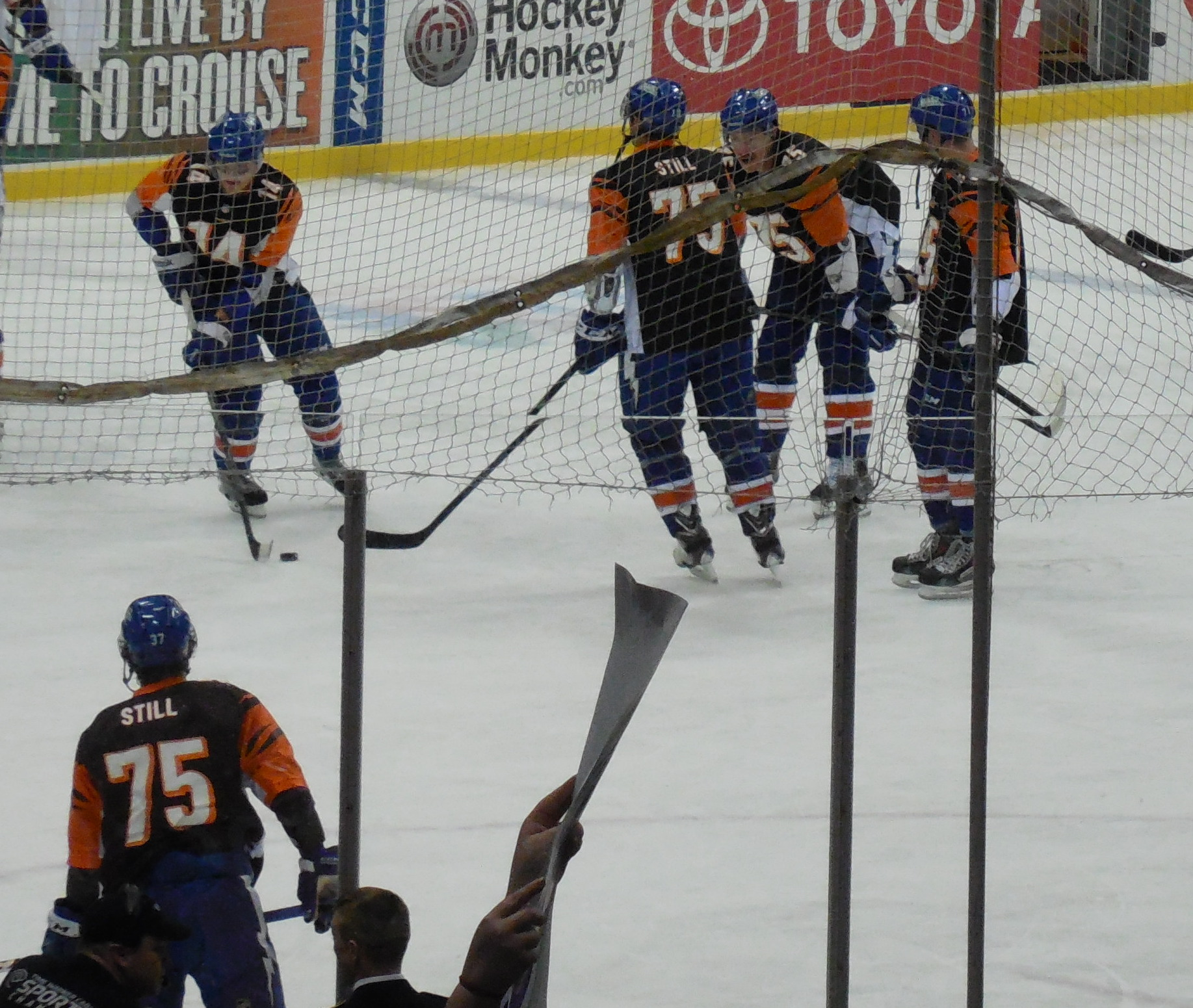
Players from the Syracuse Crunch of the American Hockey League wear Still's jersey during their warmups prior to the 2014 Toyota Frozen Dome game at the Carrier Dome paying tribute to the Neuroblastoma battle of Still's daughter Leah

In June 2014, his daughter, Leah Sari Still, was diagnosed with Neuroblastoma stage 4 cancer. Still put his football career on hiatus saying: "she's fighting for her life. Sports is not more important than me being there while my daughter is fighting for her life." Following the June 2, 2014 diagnosis, Still spent the next three weeks sleeping next to his daughter at the hospital despite his own recent back surgery. In support of his daughter, Still shaved his head bald and has said that he will grow back his hair only when Leah's does.

The Bengals demonstrated their loyalty even further by permitting Devon Still's jersey to be sold in order to raise awareness for pediatric cancer research and the Cincinnati Children's Hospital. $400,000 sales were made in four days. At the end of September, it was reported that Still's jersey donation sales neared $1 million. The New Orleans Saints head coach, Sean Payton bought 100 jerseys and distributed them to the local Boys & Girls Club and the Cincinnati Children's Hospital.

On September 25, 2014, before driving Leah to the Children's Hospital of Philadelphia for cancer surgery, Still posted a video to his Instagram account, which went viral. Still later tweeted that the tumor and lymph nodes were removed.

On October 5, 2014, during a game with the New England Patriots at Gillette Stadium in Foxborough, Massachusetts, a music video was shown on the stadium's video screen featuring Still's daughter. The Patriots cheerleaders also donned Still's' jersey to show support. It was further reported that Patriots owner Robert Kraft was donating $25,000 to Cincinnati Children's Hospital and Medical Center in Leah's name.

On March 18, 2015, Still announced that Leah had undergone surgery to get the tumor out, and that she was now cancer-free. On July 15, 2015, at the ESPY awards, Devon and Leah Still received the Jimmy V Award for their determination and perseverance in the face of cancer.

In November 2015, Still announced Leah was in remission with no signs of cancer. In January 2016, Still announced that Leah remained cancer-free and that she had "really beat cancer."

In August 2021, Still partnered with United Therapeutics to launch Braving NeuroBLASToma, an initiative to educate the public about neuroblastoma.

Still's cousins, Art Still and Levon Kirkland, have also played in the NFL.
