= 2011 Conference USA football season =

- League: NCAA Division I Football Bowl Subdivision
- Sport: Football
- Duration: September 1, 2011 through January 7, 2012
- Teams: 12
- TV partner(s): ABC, Fox Sports, CBS Sports Network, CSS, CST

2012 NFL Draft
- Top draft pick: DT Dontari Poe, Memphis
- Picked by: Kansas City Chiefs, 11th overall

Regular season
- Season MVP: QB Case Keenum, Houston
- East champions: Southern Miss
- West champions: Houston

Championship Game
- Champions: Southern Miss
- Runners-up: Houston
- Finals MVP: RB Tracy Lampley, USM

Football seasons
- 2010 2012

2011 Conference USA football standings
	Conf.			Overall
Team	W		L	W		L
East Division
No. 20 Southern Miss x$	6	–	2	12	–	2
Marshall	5	–	3	7	–	6
East Carolina	4	–	4	5	–	7
UAB	3	–	5	3	–	9
UCF	3	–	5	5	–	7
Memphis	1	–	7	2	–	10
West Division
No. 18 Houston x	8	–	0	13	–	1
Tulsa	7	–	1	8	–	5
SMU	5	–	3	8	–	5
Rice	3	–	5	4	–	8
UTEP	2	–	6	5	–	7
Tulane	1	–	7	2	–	11
Championship: Southern Miss 49, Houston 28
$ – Conference champion; x – Division champion/co-champions; As of January 10, 2012; Rankings from AP Poll

The 2011 Conference USA football season was an NCAA football season that was played from September 1, 2011, through January 2012. Conference USA consists of 12 football members separated into two divisions: East Carolina, Marshall, Memphis, Southern Miss, UAB, and UCF make up the East Division, while Houston, Rice, SMU, Tulane, Tulsa, and UTEP comprise the West Division.

The 2011 football season marked the 17th season of the conference's existence and 16th of football competition; although C-USA was established in 1995, it did not begin football competition until 1996.

== Preseason ==
=== Coaching changes ===
- Bill Blankenship replaced Todd Graham at Tulsa.

=== Preseason polls ===
No Conference USA teams were ranked though Houston, Southern Miss and UCF each received votes in the Coaches Poll, and Houston, Southern Miss, Tulsa and UCF received votes in the AP poll.

== Coaches ==
Team	Head coach	Years at school	Overall record	Record at school	C-USA record
East Carolina	Ruffin McNeill	1	7–7	6–7	5–3
Houston	Kevin Sumlin	3	23–16	23–16	16–8
Marshall	Doc Holliday	1	5–7	5–7	4–4
Memphis	Larry Porter	1	1–11	1–11	0–8
Rice	David Bailiff	4	40–45	19–30	15–17
Southern Miss	Larry Fedora	3	22–17	22–17	14–10
SMU	June Jones	3	92–64	16–23	12–12
Tulane	Bob Toledo	4	91–103	13–35	7–25
Tulsa	Bill Blankenship	–	0–0	0–0	0–0
UAB	Neil Callaway	4	15–33	15–33	11–21
UCF	George O'Leary	7	97–77	45–44	33–23
UTEP	Mike Price	7	169–167	40–45	20–28
Statistics are through the conclusion of the 2010 NCAA Season.

- Tulane head coach Bob Toledo resigned on October 18 after starting the season 2–5 and was replaced for the rest of the season by interim head coach Mark Hutson.

== Regular season ==
Index to colors and formatting
Conference USA member won
Conference USA member lost
Conference USA teams in **bold**
Rankings from Coaches' Poll

=== Week One ===
Date	Time (EDT)	Visiting team	Home team	Site	TV	Result	Attendance
September 1	8:00 p.m.	#20 Mississippi State	**Memphis**	Liberty Bowl Memorial Stadium • Memphis, Tennessee	FSN	**L** 14–59	33,990
September 3	3:30 p.m.	Southeastern Louisiana	**Tulane**	Louisiana Superdome • New Orleans	–	**W** 47–33	15,912
September 3	3:30 p.m.	UCLA	**Houston**	Robertson Stadium • Houston	FSN	**W** 38–34	31,114
September 3	7:00 p.m.	Charleston Southern	**UCF**	Bright House Networks Stadium • Orlando, Florida	BHSN	**W** 62–0	39,752
September 3	7:00 p.m.	**Rice**	#24 Texas	Darrell K Royal–Texas Memorial Stadium • Austin, Texas	Longhorn Network	**L** 9–34	101,624
September 3	7:00 p.m.	#12 South Carolina	**East Carolina**	Bank of America Stadium • Charlotte, North Carolina	FSN	**L** 37–56	58,272
September 3	8:00 p.m.	**Tulsa**	#1 Oklahoma	Gaylord Family Oklahoma Memorial Stadium • Norman, Oklahoma	FX	**L** 14–47	85,260
September 3	9:05 p.m.	Stony Brook	**UTEP**	Sun Bowl Stadium • El Paso, Texas	–	**W** 31–24 OT	28,752
September 3	10:00 p.m.	Louisiana Tech	**Southern Miss**	M. M. Roberts Stadium • Hattiesburg, Mississippi	FSN	**W** 19–17	22,356
September 4	3:30 p.m.	**Marshall**	West Virginia	Mountaineer Field • Morgantown, West Virginia	ESPN	**L** 13–34	60,758
September 4	7:30 p.m.	**SMU**	#9 Texas A&M	Kyle Field • College Station, Texas	FSN	**L** 14–46	86,951

=== Week Two ===
Date	Time (EDT)	Visiting team	Home team	Site	TV	Result	Attendance
September 10	3:30 p.m.	Purdue	**Rice**	Rice Stadium • Houston	CBS Sports Network	**W** 24–22	25,317
September 10	3:30 p.m.	**Southern Miss**	**Marshall**	Joan C. Edwards Stadium • Huntington, West Virginia	CSS	**MRSH** 26–20	24,247
September 10	3:30 p.m.	**Tulsa**	**Tulane**	Louisiana Superdome • New Orleans	CST	**TLSA** 31–3	19,752
September 10	3:30 p.m.	#11 Virginia Tech	**East Carolina**	Dowdy–Ficklen Stadium • Greenville, North Carolina	FSN	**L** 10–17	49,404
September 10	7:00 p.m.	**Houston**	North Texas	Apogee Stadium • Denton, Texas	ESPN3	**W** 48–23	28,075
September 10	7:00 p.m.	**Memphis**	Arkansas State	ASU Stadium • Jonesboro, Arkansas	–	**L** 3–47	29,872
September 10	7:00 p.m.	**UAB**	#18 Florida	Ben Hill Griffin Stadium • Gainesville, Florida	FSN	**L** 0–39	87,473
September 10	7:00 p.m.	**UTEP**	**SMU**	Gerald J. Ford Stadium • University Park, Texas	FSN	**SMU** 28–17	26,691
September 10	8:00 p.m.	Boston College	**UCF**	Bright House Networks Stadium • Orlando, Florida	CBS Sports Network	**W** 30–3	45,671

=== Week Three ===
Date	Time (EDT)	Visiting team	Home team	Site	TV	Result	Attendance
September 17	4:00 p.m.	**Tulane**	**UAB**	Legion Field • Birmingham, Alabama		**TULN** 49–10	17,658
September 17	6:00 p.m.	**UCF**	FIU	FIU Stadium • Miami	ESPN3	**L** 10–17	20,205
September 17	7:00 p.m.	**Houston**	Louisiana Tech	Joe Aillet Stadium • Ruston, Louisiana	ESPN3	**W** 35–34	24,628
September 17	7:00 p.m.	**Marshall**	Ohio	Peden Stadium • Athens, Ohio	ESPN3	**L** 7–44	24,244
September 17	7:00 p.m.	Austin Peay	**Memphis**	Liberty Bowl Memorial Stadium • Memphis, Tennessee		**W** 27–6	18,808
September 17	7:00 p.m.	Southeastern Louisiana	**Southern Miss**	M. M. Roberts Stadium • Hattiesburg, Mississippi		**W** 52–6	27,433
September 17	8:00 p.m.	Northwestern State	**SMU**	Gerald J. Ford Stadium • University Park, Texas		**W** 40–7	20,083
September 17	8:00 p.m.	**UTEP**	New Mexico State	Aggie Memorial Stadium • Las Cruces, New Mexico	ESPN3	**W** 16–10	19,751
September 17	10:00 p.m.	#7 Oklahoma State	**Tulsa**	H. A. Chapman Stadium • Tulsa, Oklahoma	FSN	**L** 33–59	24,563

=== Week Four ===
Date	Time (EDT)	Visiting team	Home team	Site	TV	Result	Attendance
September 23	8:00 p.m.	**UCF**	BYU	LaVell Edwards Stadium • Provo, Utah	ESPN	**L** 17–24	59,874
September 24	12:00 p.m.	**SMU**	**Memphis**	Liberty Bowl Memorial Stadium • Memphis, Tennessee	FSN	**SMU** 42–0	16,748
September 24	3:30 p.m.	**Tulane**	Duke	Wallace Wade Stadium • Durham, North Carolina	ESPN3	**L** 27–48	20,138
September 24	3:30 p.m.	**UAB**	**East Carolina**	Dowdy–Ficklen Stadium • Greenville, North Carolina		**ECU** 28–23	50,023
September 24	3:30 p.m.	**Southern Miss**	Virginia	Scott Stadium • Charlottesville, Virginia		**W** 30–24	43,220
September 24	3:30 p.m.	#11 Virginia Tech	**Marshall**	Joan C. Edwards Stadium • Huntington, West Virginia	CBS Sports Network	**L** 10–30	34,424
September 24	7:00 p.m.	**UTEP**	#17 South Florida	Raymond James Stadium • Tampa, Florida	ESPN3	**L** 24–52	39,628
September 24	7:00 p.m.	**Rice**	#19 Baylor	Floyd Casey Stadium • Waco, Texas	FSN	**L** 31–56	40,088
September 24	8:00 p.m.	**Tulsa**	#4 Boise State	Bronco Stadium • Boise, Idaho	CBS Sports Network	**L** 21–41	34,019
September 24	8:00 p.m.	Georgia State	**Houston**	Robertson Stadium • Houston, Texas	CSS	**W** 56–0	32,005

=== Week Five ===
Date	Time (EDT)	Visiting team	Home team	Site	TV	Result	Attendance
September 29	8:00 p.m.	**Houston**	**UTEP**	Sun Bowl Stadium • El Paso, Texas	CBS Sports Network	**HOU** 49–42	24,111
October 1	12:00 p.m.	**Tulane**	Army	Michie Stadium • West Point, New York	CBS Sports Network	**L** 6–45	31,235
October 1	3:30 p.m.	**SMU**	#20 TCU	Amon G. Carter Stadium • Fort Worth, Texas	CBS Sports Network	**W** 40–33	35,632
October 1	3:30 p.m.	**Marshall**	Louisville	Papa John's Cardinal Stadium • Louisville, Kentucky	CBS Sports Network	**W** 17–13	53,267
October 1	7:00 p.m.	**Memphis**	Middle Tennessee	Johnny "Red" Floyd Stadium • Murfreesboro, Tennessee	ESPN3	**L** 31–38	20,098
October 1	7:00 p.m.	North Texas	**Tulsa**	H. A. Chapman Stadium • Tulsa, Oklahoma		**W** 41–24	21,240
October 1	7:00 p.m.	**UAB**	Troy	Veterans Memorial Stadium • Troy, Alabama	SportSouth	**L** 23–24	18,044
October 1	8:00 p.m.	North Carolina	**East Carolina**	Dowdy–Ficklen Stadium • Greenville, North Carolina	CBS Sports Network	**L** 20–35	50,610

=== Week Six ===
Date	Time (EDT)	Visiting team	Home team	Site	TV	Result	Attendance
October 8	12:00 p.m.	Mississippi State	**UAB**	Legion Field • Birmingham, Alabama	FS South	**L** 3–21	28,351
October 8	12:30 p.m.	**Memphis**	**Rice**	Rice Stadium • Houston	CSS	**RICE** 28–6	14,179
October 8	3:30 p.m.	**Southern Miss**	Navy	Navy–Marine Corps Memorial Stadium • Annapolis, Maryland	CBS Sports Network	**W** 63–35	33,462
October 8	7:00 p.m.	**East Carolina**	**Houston**	Robertson Stadium • Houston, Texas	CBS Sports Network	**HOU** 56–3	30,126
October 8	7:00 p.m.	**Marshall**	**UCF**	Bright House Networks Stadium • Orlando, Florida	BHSN	**UCF** 16–6	24,750
October 8	8:00 p.m.	Syracuse	**Tulane**	Superdome • New Orleans		**L** 34–37	23,188

=== Week Seven ===
Date	Time (EDT)	Visiting team	Home team	Site	TV	Result	Attendance
October 15	3:00 p.m.	**Rice**	**Marshall**	Joan C. Edwards Stadium • Huntington, West Virginia		**MRSH** 24–20	27,509
October 15	3:30 p.m.	**UCF**	**SMU**	Gerald J. Ford Stadium • University Park, Texas	FSN	**SMU** 38–17	22,932
October 15	3:30 p.m.	**UTEP**	**Tulane**	Louisiana Superdome • New Orleans	FCS Central	**UTEP** 44–7	16,690
October 15	7:00 p.m.	**East Carolina**	**Memphis**	Liberty Bowl Memorial Stadium • Memphis, Tennessee		**ECU** 35–17	17,975
October 15	8:00 p.m.	**UAB**	**Tulsa**	H. A. Chapman Stadium • Tulsa, Oklahoma	CBS Sports Network	**TLSA** 37–20	21,494

=== Week Eight ===
Date	Time (EDT)	Visiting team	Home team	Site	TV	Result	Attendance
October 20	8:00 p.m.	**UCF**	**UAB**	Legion Field • Birmingham, Alabama	CSS	**UAB** 26–24	8,872
October 22	3:30 p.m.	**East Carolina**	Navy	Navy–Marine Corps Memorial Stadium • Annapolis, Maryland	CBS Sports Network	**W** 38–35	34,612
October 22	3:30 p.m.	**Memphis**	**Tulane**	Louisiana Superdome • New Orleans		**MEM** 33–17	25,158
October 22	4:30 p.m.	**Marshall**	#20 **Houston**	Robertson Stadium • Houston	CSS	**HOU** 63–28	32,107
October 22	7:00 p.m.	**Tulsa**	**Rice**	Rice Stadium • Houston	FSN	**TLSA** 38–20	17,314
October 22	8:00 p.m.	**SMU**	**Southern Miss**	M. M. Roberts Stadium • Hattiesburg, Mississippi	CBS Sports Network	**USM** 27–3	32,685
October 22	8:00 p.m.	Colorado State	**UTEP**	Sun Bowl Stadium • El Paso, Texas	Time Warner El Paso	**W** 31–17	31,797

=== Week Nine ===
Date	Time (EDT)	Visiting team	Home team	Site	TV	Result	Attendance
October 27	8:00 p.m.	**Rice**	#18 **Houston**	Robertson Stadium • Houston, Texas	FSN	**HOU** 73–34	32,112
October 29	12:00 p.m.	**UAB**	**Marshall**	Joan C. Edwards Stadium • Huntington, West Virginia	CSS	**MRSH** 59–14	20,735
October 29	3:30 p.m.	**Tulane**	**East Carolina**	Dowdy–Ficklen Stadium • Greenville, North Carolina		**ECU** 34–13	49,410
October 29	3:30 p.m.	**SMU**	**Tulsa**	Skelly Field at H. A. Chapman Stadium • Tulsa, Oklahoma	FSN	**TLSA** 38–7	21,261
October 29	4:00 p.m.	**Memphis**	**UCF**	Bright House Networks Stadium • Orlando, Florida	BHSN	**UCF** 41–0	37,683
October 29	8:00 p.m.	#25 **Southern Miss**	**UTEP**	Sun Bowl Stadium • El Paso, Texas	CBS Sports Network	**USM** 31–13	24,906

=== Week Ten ===
Date	Time (EDT)	Visiting team	Home team	Site	TV	Result	Attendance
November 3	8:00 p.m.	**Tulsa**	**UCF**	Bright House Networks Stadium • Orlando, Florida	CBS Sports Network	**TLSA** 24–17	36,712
November 5	3:00 p.m.	**Tulane**	**SMU**	Gerald J. Ford Stadium • University Park, Texas		**SMU** 45–24	20,106
November 5	3:30 p.m.	**UTEP**	**Rice**	Rice Stadium • Houston	FSN	**RICE** 41–37	14,372
November 5	4:00 p.m.	#24 **Southern Miss**	**East Carolina**	Dowdy–Ficklen Stadium • Greenville, North Carolina	CSS	**USM** 48–28	50,345
November 5	8:00 p.m.	#14 **Houston**	**UAB**	Legion Field • Birmingham, Alabama	CBS Sports Network	**HOU** 56–13	13,909

=== Week Eleven ===
Date	Time (EDT)	Visiting team	Home team	Site	TV	Result	Attendance
November 10	8:00 p.m.	#11 **Houston**	**Tulane**	Mercedes-Benz Superdome • New Orleans	CBS Sports Network	**HOU** 73–17	17,657
November 12	12:00 p.m.	**Rice**	Northwestern	Ryan Field • Evanston, Illinois	BTN	**L** 6–28	26,886
November 12	12:00 p.m.	**Marshall**	**Tulsa**	Skelly Field at H. A. Chapman Stadium • Tulsa, Oklahoma	FSN	**TLSA** 59–17	17,672
November 12	3:30 p.m.	Navy	**SMU**	Gerald J. Ford Stadium • University Park, Texas	FSN	**L** 17–24	21,080
November 12	4:15 p.m.	**UAB**	**Memphis**	Liberty Bowl Memorial Stadium • Memphis, Tennessee		**UAB** 41–35	17,848
November 12	8:00 p.m.	**UCF**	#23 **Southern Miss**	M. M. Roberts Stadium • Hattiesburg, Mississippi	CBS Sports Network	**USM** 30–29	32,925
November 12	8:00 p.m.	**East Carolina**	**UTEP**	Sun Bowl Stadium • El Paso, Texas	Time Warner El Paso	**UTEP** 22–17	25,571

=== Week Twelve ===
Date	Time (EDT)	Visiting team	Home team	Site	TV	Result	Attendance
November 17	8:00 p.m.	**Marshall**	**Memphis**	Liberty Bowl Memorial Stadium • Memphis, Tennessee	FSN	**MRSH** 23–22	15,101
November 17	8:00 p.m.	#20 **Southern Miss**	**UAB**	Legion Field • Birmingham, Alabama	CBS Sports Network	**UAB** 34–31	14,103
November 19	3:00 p.m.	**Tulsa**	**UTEP**	Sun Bowl • El Paso, Texas	Time Warner El Paso	**TLSA** 57–28	23,849
November 19	3:30 p.m.	**SMU**	#10 **Houston**	Robertson Stadium • Houston, Texas	FSN	**HOU** 37–7	32,207
November 19	3:30 p.m.	**Tulane**	**Rice**	Ryan Field • Evanston, Illinois		**RICE** 19–7	15,461
November 19	7:00 p.m.	**UCF**	**East Carolina**	Dowdy–Ficklen Stadium • Greenville, North Carolina	FSN	**ECU** 38–31	50,277

=== Week Thirteen ===
Date	Time (EDT)	Visiting team	Home team	Site	TV	Result	Attendance
November 25	12:00 p.m.	#7 **Houston**	**Tulsa**	Skelly Field at H. A. Chapman Stadium • Tulsa, Oklahoma	FSN	**HOU** 48–16	29,015
November 25	7:00 p.m.	**UTEP**	**UCF**	Bright House Networks Stadium • Orlando, Florida	CBS Sports Network	**UCF** 31–14	21,127
November 26	12:00 p.m.	**Rice**	**SMU**	Gerald J. Ford Stadium • University Park, Texas	FSN	**SMU** 27–24	14,442
November 26	3:30 p.m.	**East Carolina**	**Marshall**	Joan C. Edwards Stadium • Huntington, West Virginia	CBS Sports Network	**MRSH** 34–27 OT	22,456
November 26	4:00 p.m.	**UAB**	Florida Atlantic	FAU Stadium • Boca Raton, Florida		**L** 35–38	12,044
November 26	4:00 p.m.	**Memphis**	**Southern Miss**	M. M. Roberts Stadium • Hattiesburg, Mississippi	CSS	**USM** 44–7	26,347
November 26	11:00 p.m.	**Tulane**	Hawaii	Aloha Stadium • Honolulu, HI	Oceanic PPV/ESPN3	**L** 23–35	27,411

=== Week Fourteen- C-USA Championship Game ===
Date	Time (EDT)	Visiting team	Home team	Site	TV	Result	Attendance
December 3	12:00 p.m.	#23 **Southern Miss**	#6 **Houston**	Robertson Stadium • Houston	ABC	**USM** 49–28	32,413

== Players of the week ==
Week	Offensive		Defensive		Special teams	
Week	Player	Team	Player	Team	Player	Team
1 – Sep. 5	Case Keenum, QB	Houston	Cordarro Law, DL	Southern Miss	Robert Kelley, KR	Tulane
2 – Sep. 12	Patrick Edwards, WR	Houston	Ja'Gared Davis, LB; George Carpenter, LB	SMU; Marshall	Kase Whitehead, P	Marshall
3 – Sep. 19	Case Keenum, QB; Ryan Griffin, QB	Houston; Tulane	Korey Williams, LB	Southern Miss	Nick Adams, KR	UAB
4 – Sep. 26	Reggie Bullock, RB	ECU	Jamie Bender, S	UAB	Danny Hrapmann, K	Southern Miss.
5 – Oct. 3	Darius Johnson, WR	SMU	Tyson Gale, LB	Marshall	Kase Whitehead, P	Marshall
6 – Oct. 10	Austin Davis, QB	Southern Miss.	Phillip Steward, LB	Houston	Marques Wheaton, DB	Southern Miss.
7 – Oct. 17	J.J. McDermott, QB	SMU	Vinny Curry, DE	Marshall	Richard Crawford, PR	SMU

== Rankings ==
Legend
	Improvement in ranking
	Drop in ranking
	Not ranked previous week
RV	Received votes but were not ranked in Top 25 of poll

Ranking Movement
		Pre	Wk 1	Wk 2	Wk 3	Wk 4	Wk 5	Wk 6	Wk 7	Wk 8	Wk 9	Wk 10	Wk 11	Wk 12	Wk 13	Wk 14	Final
East Carolina Pirates	AP	–	–	–	–	–	–	–	–	–	–	–	–	–	–	–	–
East Carolina Pirates	C	–	–	–	–	–	–	–	–	–	–	–	–	–	–	–	–
East Carolina Pirates	HAR	Not released						–	–	–	–	–	–	–	–	–	
East Carolina Pirates	BCS	Not released							–	–	–	–	–	–	–	–	
Houston Cougars	AP	RV	RV	RV	RV	RV	RV	25	21	18	14	11	11	6	7	20	18
Houston Cougars	C	RV	RV	RV	RV	RV	RV	22	20	18	14	11	10	7	6	17	14
Houston Cougars	HAR	Not released						24	22	18	14	11	10	7	6	17	
Houston Cougars	BCS	Not released							19	17	13	11	11	8	6	19	
Marshall Thundering Herd	AP	–	–	–	–	–	–	–	–	–	–	–	–	–	–	–	–
Marshall Thundering Herd	C	–	–	–	–	–	–	–	–	–	–	–	–	–	–	–	–
Marshall Thundering Herd	HAR	Not released						–	–	–	–	–	–	–	–	–	
Marshall Thundering Herd	BCS	Not released							–	–	–	–	–	–	–	–	
Memphis Tigers	AP	–	–	–	–	–	–	–	–	–	–	–	–	–	–	–	–
Memphis Tigers	C	–	–	–	–	–	–	–	–	–	–	–	–	–	–	–	–
Memphis Tigers	HAR	Not released						–	–	–	–	–	–	–	–	–	
Memphis Tigers	BCS	Not released							–	–	–	–	–	–	–	–	
Rice Owls	AP	–	–	–	–	–	–	–	–	–	–	–	–	–	–	–	–
Rice Owls	C	–	–	–	–	–	–	–	–	–	–	–	–	–	–	–	–
Rice Owls	HAR	Not released						–	–	–	–	–	–	–	–	–	
Rice Owls	BCS	Not released							–	–	–	–	–	–	–	–	
Southern Miss Golden Eagles	AP	RV	RV	–	–	–	–	RV	RV	RV	RV	25	22	RV	24	22	20
Southern Miss Golden Eagles	C	RV	RV	–	–	–	RV	RV	RV	25	24	23	20	RV	23	21	19
Southern Miss Golden Eagles	HAR	Not released						RV	RV	RV	RV	23	20	RV	23	21	
Southern Miss Golden Eagles	BCS	Not released							–	–	25	22	20	–	24	21	
SMU Mustangs	AP	–	–	–	–	–	RV	RV	RV	–	–	–	–	–	–	–	–
SMU Mustangs	C	–	–	–	–	–	RV	RV	RV	RV	–	–	–	–	–	–	–
SMU Mustangs	HAR	Not released						RV	RV	–	–	–	–	–	–	–	
SMU Mustangs	BCS	Not released							–	–	–	–	–	–	–	–	
Tulane Green Wave	AP	–	–	–	–	–	–	–	–	–	–	–	–	–	–	–	–
Tulane Green Wave	C	–	–	–	–	–	–	–	–	–	–	–	–	–	–	–	–
Tulane Green Wave	HAR	Not released						–	–	–	–	–	–	–	–	–	
Tulane Green Wave	BCS	Not released							–	–	–	–	–	–	–	–	
Tulsa Golden Hurricane	AP	RV	–	–	–	–	–	–	–	–	–	–	–	–	–	–	–
Tulsa Golden Hurricane	C	–	–	–	–	–	–	–	–	–	–	–	–	–	–	–	–
Tulsa Golden Hurricane	HAR	Not released						–	–	–	–	–	–	–	–	–	
Tulsa Golden Hurricane	BCS	Not released							–	–	–	–	–	–	–	–	
UAB Blazers	AP	–	–	–	–	–	–	–	–	–	–	–	–	–	–	–	–
UAB Blazers	C	–	–	–	–	–	–	–	–	–	–	–	–	–	–	–	–
UAB Blazers	HAR	Not released						–	–	–	–	–	–	–	–	–	
UAB Blazers	BCS	Not released							–	–	–	–	–	–	–	–	
UCF Knights	AP	RV	RV	RV	–	–	–	–	–	–	–	–	–	–	–	–	–
UCF Knights	C	RV	RV	RV	–	–	–	–	–	–	–	–	–	–	–	–	–
UCF Knights	HAR	Not released						–	–	–	–	–	–	–	–	–	
UCF Knights	BCS	Not released							–	–	–	–	–	–	–	–	
UTEP Miners	AP	–	–	–	–	–	–	–	–	–	–	–	–	–	–	–	–
UTEP Miners	C	–	–	–	–	–	–	–	–	–	–	–	–	–	–	–	–
UTEP Miners	HAR	Not released						–	–	–	–	–	–	–	–	–	
UTEP Miners	BCS	Not released							–	–	–	–	–	–	–	–	

== Records against other conferences ==
Conference	Wins	Losses
ACC	2	4
Big 12	0	5
Big East	1	3
Big Ten	1	1
Independents	2	3
MAC	0	1
Mountain West	2	1
Pac-12	1	0
SEC	0	4
Sun Belt	2	5
WAC	3	1
All FCS	7	0
Overall	21	28

== Bowl games ==
Bowl Game	Date	Stadium	City	Television	Matchups/Results	Attendance	Payout per team (US$)
2011 Beef 'O' Brady's Bowl	December 20, 2011	Tropicana Field	St. Petersburg, Florida	ESPN	Marshall 20, Florida International 10	20,072	$1,000,000
2011 Hawai'i Bowl	December 24, 2011	Aloha Stadium	Honolulu, HI	ESPN	#21 Southern Miss 24, Nevada 17	32,630	$750,000
2011 Armed Forces Bowl	December 30, 2011	Gerald J. Ford Stadium	University Park, Texas	ESPN	BYU 24, Tulsa 21	30,258	$750,000
2012 TicketCity Bowl	January 2, 2012	Cotton Bowl	Dallas	ESPNU	#19 Houston 30, #22 Penn State 14	46,817	$1,200,000
2012 BBVA Compass Bowl	January 7, 2012	Legion Field	Birmingham, Alabama	ESPN	SMU 28, Pitt 6	29,726	

=== Bowl Eligibility ===
==== Bowl Eligible (5) ====
- Houston (12–1) became bowl eligible on October 8 after defeating East Carolina.
- Southern Miss (11–2) became bowl eligible on October 22 after defeating SMU.
- Tulsa (8–4) became bowl eligible on November 3 after defeating UCF.
- SMU (7–5) became bowl eligible on November 5 after defeating Tulane.
- Marshall (6–6) became bowl eligible on November 26 after defeating East Carolina

==== Bowl Ineligible (7) ====
- UAB (3–9) lost the ability to become bowl eligible on October 29 after losing to Marshall.
- Tulane (2–10) lost the ability to become bowl eligible on October 29 after losing to East Carolina.
- Memphis (2–10) lost the ability to become bowl eligible on October 29 after losing to UCF.
- Rice (4–8) lost the ability to become bowl eligible on November 13 after losing to Northwestern.
- UCF (5–7) lost the ability to become bowl eligible on November 19 after losing to East Carolina.
- UTEP (5–7) lost the ability to become bowl eligible on November 25 after losing to UCF.
- East Carolina (5–7) lost the ability to become bowl eligible on November 26 after losing to Marshall.

== All-Conference players ==
Coaches All-Conference Selections

Position	Player	Class	Team
First Team Offense (Coaches)
QB	Case Keenum	SR	Houston
RB	Zach Line	SR	SMU
RB	Charles Sims	SO	Houston
OL	Clint Anderson	SR	Tulsa
OL	Kelvin Beachum	SR	SMU
OL	Lamar Holmes	SR	Southern Miss
OL	Matt McCants	SR	UAB
OL	Chris Thompson	SR	Houston
TE	Justin Johnson	SR	Houston
WR	Cole Beasley	SR	SMU
WR	Patrick Edwards	SR	Houston
WR	Darius Johnson	JR	SMU
First Team Defense (Coaches)
DL	Vinny Curry	SR	Marshall
DL	Tyrunn Walker	SR	Tulsa
DL	Cordarro Law	SR	Southern Miss
DL	Taylor Thompson	SR	SMU
LB	Cornelius Arnick	SR	Tulsa
LB	Sammy Brown	SR	Houston
LB	Trent Mackey	JR	Tulane
DB	Omar Brown	SR	Marshall
DB	Richard Crawford	SR	SMU
DB	Marquese Wheaton	SR	Southern Miss
DB	Josh Robinson	JR	UCF
First Team Special Teams (Coaches)
K	Kevin Fitzpatrick	SR	Tulsa
P	Kyle Martens	SR	Rice
KR	Rannell Hall	FR	UCF
PR	Tracy Lampley	SR	Southern Miss
LS	Matt Camilli	SR	UTEP

Position	Player	Class	Team
Second Team Offense (Coaches)
QB	Austin Davis	SR	Southern Miss
QB	G. J. Kinne	SR	Tulsa
RB	Orleans Darkwa	SO	Tulane
RB	Ja'Terian Douglas	SO	Tulsa
OL	Jacoby Ashworth	JR	Houston
OL	Joe Duhon	JR	Southern Miss
OL	Ronald Leary	SR	Memphis
OL	Nick Pieschel	SR	UCF
OL	Jason Weaver	SR	Southern Miss
TE	Clay Sears	SR	Tulsa
WR	Tyron Carrier	SR	Houston
WR	Willie Carter	JR	Tulsa
WR	Lance Lewis	SR	East Carolina
Second Team Defense (Coaches)
DL	Marquis Frazier	SR	SMU
DL	Dezman Moses	SR	Tulane
DL	Dontari Poe	JR	Memphis
DL	Scott Solomon	SR	Rice
LB	Ja'Gared Davis	SR	SMU
LB	Marcus McGraw	SR	Houston
LB	Taylor Reed	JR	SMU
DB	Jamie Bender	SR	UAB
DB	Emanuel Davis	JR	East Carolina
DB	D. J. Hayden	JR	Houston
DB	Dexter McCoil	JR	Tulsa
Second Team Special Teams (Coaches)
K	Daniel Hrapmann	SR	Southern Miss
P	Ian Campbell	JR	UTEP
KR	Tyron Carrier	SR	Houston
PR	Patrick Edwards	SR	Houston
LS	Charley Hughlett	SR	UCF

== Attendance ==
Team	Stadium	Capacity	Gm 1	Gm 2	Gm 3	Gm 4	Gm 5	Gm 6	Gm 7	Total	Average	% of Capacity
East Carolina	Dowdy–Ficklen Stadium	50,000	49,404	50,023	50,610	49,410	50,345	50,277	—	300,069	50,012	100%
Houston	Robertson Stadium	32,000	31,114	32,005	30,126	32,107	32,112	32,207	32,413	222,084	31,726	99.1%
Marshall	Joan C. Edwards Stadium	38,019	24,247	34,424	27,509	20,735	22,456	—	—	129,371	25,874	68.1%
Memphis	Liberty Bowl Memorial Stadium	62,380	33,990	18,808	16,748	17,975	17,848	15,101	—	120,470	20,078	32.2%
Rice	Rice Stadium	47,000	25,317	14,179	17,314	14,372	15,461	—	—	86,643	17,329	36.9%
Southern Miss	M. M. Roberts Stadium	36,000	22,356	27,433	28,656	32,685	32,925	26,347	—	170,402	28,400	78.9%
SMU	Gerald J. Ford Stadium	32,000	26,691	20,083	22,932	20,106	21,080	14,442	—	125,334	20,889	65.3%
Tulane	Louisiana Superdome	72,968	15,912	19,752	23,188	16,690	25,158	17,657	—	118,627	19,771	27.1%
Tulsa	H. A. Chapman Stadium	30,000	24,563	21,240	21,494	21,261	17,672	29,015	—	135,245	22,541	75.1%
UAB	Legion Field	71,594	17,658	28,351	8,872	13,909	14,103	—	—	82,893	16,579	23.2%
UCF	Bright House Networks Stadium	45,301	39,752	45,671	24,750	37,683	36,712	21,127	—	205,695	34,283	75.7%
UTEP	Sun Bowl Stadium	51,500	28,752	24,111	31,797	24,906	25,571	23,849	—	158,986	26,948	52.3%
