= 2011 Lamar Cardinals football team =

American college football season

2011 Lamar Cardinals football
- Conference: Southland Conference
- Record: 4–7 (2–5 Southland)
- Head coach: Ray Woodard (2nd season)
- Offensive scheme: Multiple
- Co-defensive coordinators: Craig McGallion (2nd season); Allen Johnson (2nd season)
- Base defense: 3–4
- Home stadium: Provost Umphrey Stadium

2011 Southland Conference football standings
| | Conf. | | | Overall |
| Team | W | | L | W | | L |
|---|---|---|---|---|---|---|
| No. 2 Sam Houston State $^ | 7 | – | 0 | 14 | – | 1 |
| No. 14 Central Arkansas ^ | 6 | – | 1 | 9 | – | 4 |
| Stephen F. Austin | 5 | – | 2 | 6 | – | 5 |
| McNeese State | 4 | – | 3 | 6 | – | 5 |
| Northwestern State | 3 | – | 4 | 5 | – | 6 |
| Lamar | 2 | – | 5 | 4 | – | 7 |
| Southeastern Louisiana | 1 | – | 6 | 3 | – | 8 |
| Nicholls State | 0 | – | 7 | 1 | – | 10 |
$ – Conference champion; ^ – FCS playoff participant; Rankings from The Sports Network poll

The 2011 Lamar Cardinals football team represented Lamar University in the 2011 NCAA Division I FCS football season. The Cardinals were led by second-year head coach Ray Woodard and played their home games at Provost Umphrey Stadium. They are a member of the Southland Conference. This was the first season Lamar played as a Southland Conference member in football since 1986. They finished the season 4–7, 2–5 in Southland play to finish in sixth place.

== Schedule ==
| Date | Time | Opponent | Site | TV | Result | Attendance |
|---|---|---|---|---|---|---|
| September 3 | 7:00 pm | Texas College* | Provost Umphrey Stadium; Beaumont, TX | | W 58–0 | 15,367 |
| September 10 | 4:00 pm | at South Alabama* | Ladd–Peebles Stadium; Mobile, AL | KBTV | L 8–30 | 18,136 |
| September 17 | 7:00 pm | Incarnate Word* | Provost Umphrey Stadium; Beaumont, TX | KBTV/ESPN3 | W 45–35 | 15,367 |
| October 1 | 3:00 pm | at Southeastern Louisiana | Strawberry Stadium; Hammond, LA | SLC TV/ESPN3 | W 48–38 | 5,104 |
| October 8 | 7:00 pm | Northwestern State | Provost Umphrey Stadium; Beaumont, TX | | L 17–37 | 15,367 |
| October 15 | 6:00 pm | at Texas State* | Bobcat Stadium; San Marcos, TX | | L 21–46 | 15,028 |
| October 22 | 3:00 pm | Central Arkansas^{†} | Provost Umphrey Stadium; Beaumont, TX | SLC TV | L 24–38 | 15,367 |
| October 29 | 2:00 pm | at No. 6 Sam Houston State | Bowers Stadium; Huntsville, TX | KBTV | L 0–66 | 6,575 |
| November 5 | 6:00 pm | Stephen F. Austin State | Provost Umphrey Stadium; Beaumont, TX | | L 10–69 | 11,286 |
| November 12 | 5:30 pm | at Nicholls State | John L. Guidry Stadium; Thibodaux, LA | KBTV/WHNO/ESPN3 | W 34–26 | 5,466 |
| November 19 | 6:00 pm | McNeese State | Provost Umphrey Stadium; Beaumont, TX (Battle of the Border) | | L 17–45 | 13,901 |
*Non-conference game; ^{†}Homecoming; Rankings from The Sports Network Poll released prior to the game; All times are in Central time
