= 2011 Texas State Bobcats football team =

American college football season

2011 Texas State Bobcats football
- Conference: Independent
- Record: 6–6
- Head coach: Dennis Franchione (3rd overall season)
- Offensive coordinator: Mike Schultz (1st season)
- Co-offensive coordinator: Darrell Dickey (1st season)
- Offensive scheme: Multiple
- Defensive coordinator: Craig Naivar (1st season)
- Base defense: 4–2–5
- Home stadium: Bobcat Stadium

2011 NCAA Division I FCS independents football standings
	Conf.			Overall
Team	W		L	W		L
South Alabama		–		6	–	4
Texas State		–		6	–	6
UTSA		–		4	–	6
Georgia State		–		3	–	8

The 2011 Texas State Bobcats football team represented Texas State University–San Marcos in the 2011 NCAA Division I FCS football season. The Bobcats were led by Dennis Franchione in the 1st year of his second stint as the Bobcats' head coach and played their home games at Bobcat Stadium. Despite playing seven games against teams from their former conference, the Southland Conference, they were technically an FCS independent as they transitioned to the Football Bowl Subdivision. They will become a member of the Western Athletic Conference in 2012 and become a full FBS member in 2013. They finished the season 6–6.

== Schedule ==
Date	Time	Opponent	Site	TV	Result	Attendance
September 3	6:00 pm	at Texas Tech	Jones AT&T Stadium; Lubbock, TX		L 10–50	51,792
September 10	5:00 pm	at Wyoming	War Memorial Stadium; Laramie, WY	Mtn.	L 10–45	23,248
September 17	6:00 pm	Tarleton State	Bobcat Stadium; San Marcos, TX		W 38–28	15,800
September 24	6:00 pm	at No. 22 Stephen F. Austin	Homer Bryce Stadium; Nacogdoches, TX		W 35–26	9,145
October 1	6:00 pm	Nicholls State	Bobcat Stadium; San Marcos, TX (Battle for the Paddle)	TSAA	W 38–12	15,502
October 8	7:00 pm	at No. 15 McNeese State	Cowboy Stadium; Lake Charles, LA		W 21–14	12,194
October 15	6:00 pm	Lamar	Bobcat Stadium; San Marcos, TX	TSAA	W 46–21	15,028
October 22	7:00 pm	at Southeastern Louisiana	Strawberry Stadium; Hammond, LA	Southeastern Channel	L 28–38	4,137
October 29	3:00 pm	Northwestern State	Bobcat Stadium; San Marcos, TX	TSAA	L 10–23	14,473
November 5	3:00 pm	Prairie View A&M	Bobcat Stadium; San Marcos, TX	TSAA	W 34–26	14,222
November 12	4:00 pm	at No. 19 Central Arkansas	Estes Stadium; Conway, AR		L 22–23	7,724
November 19	2:00 pm	No. 2 Sam Houston State	Bobcat Stadium; San Marcos, TX (rivalry)	TSAA	L 14–36	15,613
Rankings from The Sports Network Poll released prior to the game; All times are in Central time
