= 2011 UTSA Roadrunners football team =

American college football season

2011 UTSA Roadrunners football
- Conference: Independent
- Record: 4–6
- Head coach: Larry Coker (1st season)
- Offensive coordinator: Travis Bush (1st season)
- Offensive scheme: Spread
- Defensive coordinator: Neal Neathery (1st season)
- Base defense: 4–2–5
- Home stadium: Alamodome

2011 NCAA Division I FCS independents football standings
	Conf.			Overall
Team	W		L	W		L
South Alabama		–		6	–	4
Texas State		–		6	–	6
UTSA		–		4	–	6
Georgia State		–		3	–	8

The 2011 UTSA Roadrunners football team represented the University of Texas at San Antonio in the 2011 NCAA Division I FCS football season. It was the first year of play for UTSA. The team was coached by veteran head football coach Larry Coker. The team played its home games at the Alamodome and competed as an independent in the NCAA Division I Football Championship Subdivision. It was UTSA's only season as a Division I FCS team, as the Roadrunners moved to the Western Athletic Conference for the 2012 NCAA Division I FBS football season. Because UTSA was transitioning to the FBS, the NCAA declared the team ineligible for the FCS playoffs.

UTSA played its first game against Northeastern State on September 3, 2011, at the Alamodome, a 31–3 victory for UTSA. With an attendance of 56,743, UTSA set a record for the highest-attended game for an NCAA Division I FCS start-up program.

UTSA finished their first season with a record of 4–6, and set a record for the largest average home attendance for a new football program with 35,521. This topped the previous record from South Florida of 33,038 in 1997.

== Recruiting ==
College recruiting information (2011)
Name	Hometown	School	Height	Weight	40^{‡}	Commit date
Kenny Bias; WR	San Antonio, Texas	John Paul Stevens	6 ft 2 in (1.88 m)	175 lb (79 kg)	4.4	Oct 21, 2010
Kenny Bias; WR	Recruit ratings: Scout: Rivals: ESPN: (-)					
Kristian Bryant; TE	Houston, Texas	Klein Forest	6 ft 1 in (1.85 m)	216 lb (98 kg)	-	Mar 2, 2011
Kristian Bryant; TE	Recruit ratings: Scout: Rivals: ESPN: (-)					
Desmon Mathis; DB	Brenham, TX	Brenham	5 ft 10 in (1.78 m)	175 lb (79 kg)	4.4	Jan 2, 2011
Desmon Mathis; DB	Recruit ratings: Scout: Rivals: ESPN: (73)					
Josiah Monroe; ATH	Bastrop, Texas	Bastrop	5 ft 8 in (1.73 m)	175 lb (79 kg)	-	Feb 12, 2010
Josiah Monroe; ATH	Recruit ratings: Scout: Rivals: ESPN: (45)					
Ryan Polite; QB	Desoto, Texas	Desoto	6 ft 1 in (1.85 m)	201 lb (91 kg)	4.85	Feb 12, 2010
Ryan Polite; QB	Recruit ratings: Scout: Rivals: ESPN: (77)					
Jake Smith; LB	Gruver, Texas	Gruver	5 ft 10 in (1.78 m)	175 lb (79 kg)	-	Jan 16, 2011
Jake Smith; LB	Recruit ratings: Scout: Rivals: ESPN: (68)					
Blake Terry; LB	Denton, Texas	John H. Guyer	6 ft 0 in (1.83 m)	235 lb (107 kg)	4.7	Jan 16, 2011
Blake Terry; LB	Recruit ratings: Scout: Rivals: ESPN: (71)					
Alondre Thorn; CB	Hutto, Texas	Hutto	5 ft 10 in (1.78 m)	160 lb (73 kg)	-	Jul 29, 2010
Alondre Thorn; CB	Recruit ratings: Scout: Rivals: ESPN: (45)					
Terrance Wilburn; RB	San Marcos, Texas	San Marcos	6 ft 1 in (1.85 m)	202.5 lb (91.9 kg)	-	Sep 6, 2010
Terrance Wilburn; RB	Recruit ratings: Scout: Rivals: ESPN: (45)					
Tevin Williams; RB	Euless, Texas	Euless Trinity	6 ft 0 in (1.83 m)	190 lb (86 kg)	4.4	Jan 26, 2011
Tevin Williams; RB	Recruit ratings: Scout: Rivals: ESPN: (75)					
Troy Williams; RB	San Antonio, Texas	James Madison	5 ft 10 in (1.78 m)	195 lb (88 kg)	4.5	Sep 9, 2010
Troy Williams; RB	Recruit ratings: Scout: Rivals: ESPN: (74)					
Overall recruit ranking:
‡ Refers to 40-yard dash; Note: In many cases, Scout, Rivals, 247Sports, On3, and ESPN may conflict in their listings of height, weight and 40 time.; In these cases, the average was taken. ESPN grades are on a 100-point scale.; Sources: "2011 UTSA Football Commitment List". Rivals.; "2011 Player Signees- UTSA". ESPN.; "2011 Team Ranking". Rivals.com.

== Schedule ==
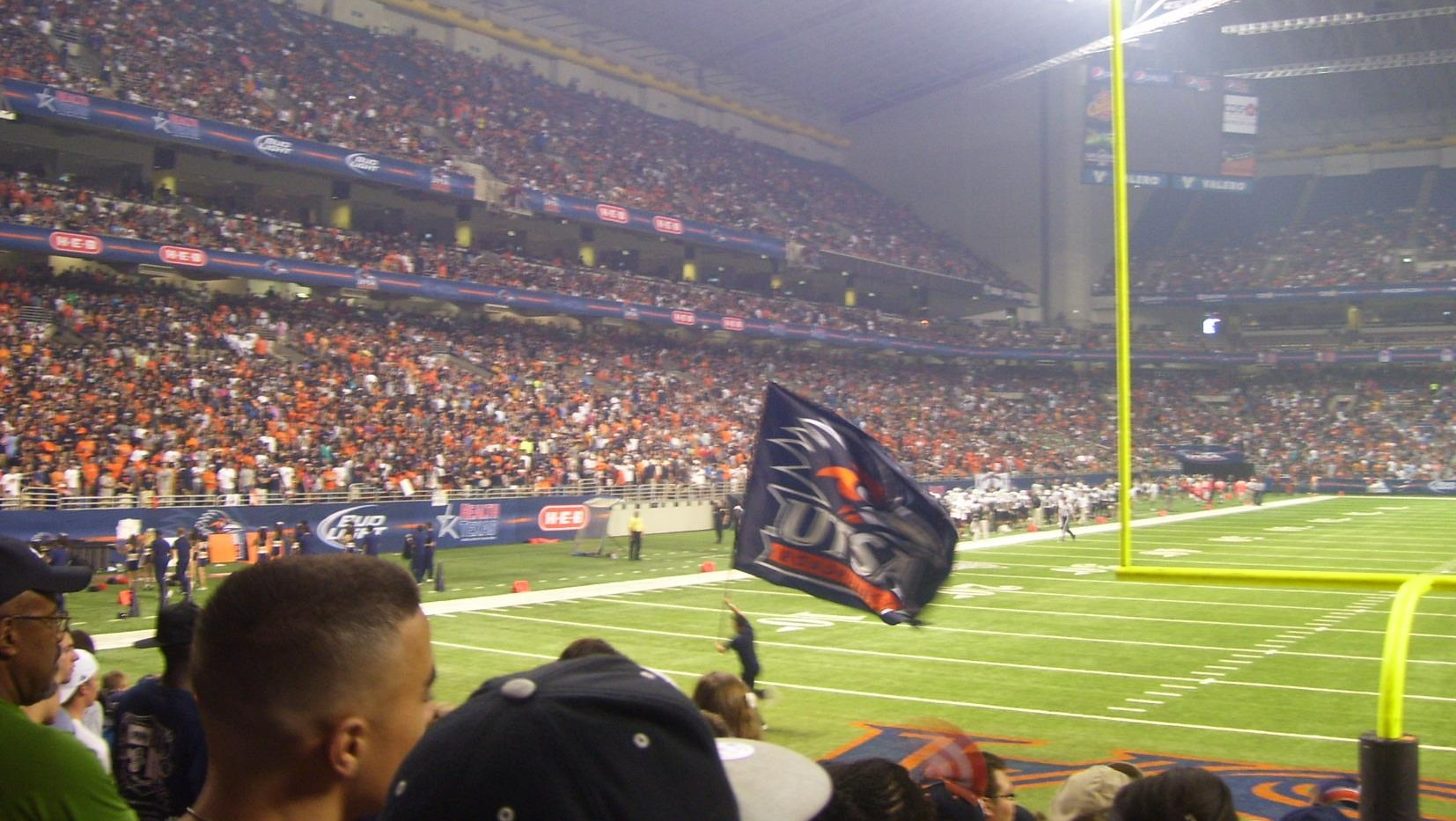
UTSA's inaugural football game versus Northeastern State

The night before the program's first game, it was reported that the Longhorn Network (LHN), the Texas Longhorns-based network, would air the final five Roadrunner home games. At the time of the initial news reports, the five scheduled UTSA games were more than the two Texas football games (against Rice and Kansas) scheduled for the network. The kickoff times for the scheduled games were moved to fit with the LHN schedule.

Date	Time	Opponent	Site	TV	Result	Attendance
September 3	1:00 p.m.	Northeastern State	Alamodome; San Antonio, TX		W 31–3	56,743
September 10	1:00 p.m.	McMurry	Alamodome; San Antonio, TX	LHN	L 21–24	31,634
September 17	7:00 p.m.	at Southern Utah	Eccles Coliseum; Cedar City, UT	KMYU	L 22–45	8,683
September 24	1:00 p.m.	Bacone^{†}	Alamodome; San Antonio, TX	LHN	W 54–7	33,517
October 1	6:00 p.m.	at No. 16 Sam Houston State	Bowers Stadium; Huntsville, TX		L 7–22	6,889
October 8	4:30 p.m.	South Alabama	Alamodome; San Antonio, TX	LHN	L 27–30 ^{2OT}	32,886
October 15	4:00 p.m.	at UC Davis	Aggie Stadium; Davis, CA		L 17–38	8,876
October 29	12:30 p.m.	Georgia State	Alamodome; San Antonio, TX	LHN	W 17–14 ^{OT}	25,977
November 12	7:00 p.m.	at McNeese State	Cowboy Stadium; Lake Charles, LA		L 21–24	11,463
November 19	1:00 p.m.	Minot State	Alamodome; San Antonio, TX	LHN	W 49–7	32,369
^{†}Homecoming; Rankings from The Sports Network FCS Poll released prior to game poll released prior to the game; All times are in Central time

== Roster ==
2011 UTSA Roadrunners football team roster
Players
Coaches
Offense

Pos.	#	Name	Class
WR	1	Kam Jones (C)	Fr
WR	3	Noe Garcia	Fr
WR	5	Brandon Armstrong	Fr
RB	6	Tevin Williams	Fr
QB	7	Ryan Polite	Fr
QB	8	Eric Soza (C)	So
WR	9	Marcellus Mack	Fr
WR	10	Jake Wanamaker	Fr
RB	11	David Glasco II	Fr
QB	12	John Free	Fr
WR	12	Earon Holmes (injured)	Fr
QB	14	Travis Menn	Fr
TE	14	Cole Hubble (injured)	Fr
WR	15	Josiah Monroe	Fr
QB	16	John Simmons	Fr
WR	17	Sean Hesler	Fr
WR	18	Kenny Harrison	Fr
RB	21	Chris Johnson	Fr
WR	26	Cole Hicks	So
RB	27	Nate Shaw	Fr
RB	28	Terrance Wilburn	Fr
RB	36	Evans Okotcha	So
RB	39	Richard Mendoza	Jr
RB	41	CheRod Simpson	So
RB	46	Sean Atkin (injured)	Jr
G	51	Payton Rion	Fr
G	54	Darius Anderson	Fr
C	55	Nate Leonard (C)	Fr
OL	56	Mike Sanchez	Sr
C	60	Andy Flores	Fr
C	62	Jamie Bernal	Fr
G	65	Michael Roberson	Fr
OT	68	Cody Harris (injured)	Fr
OT	71	Chance Vernon	Fr
OT	74	Drew Phillips	Fr
G	75	Brady Brown	Jr
OT	76	Josh Walker	Fr
OT	77	James Bakke	Fr
OL	78	Patrick Hoog (injured)	Jr
G	79	Scott Inskeep	Fr
TE	80	TJ Nielsen	Jr
WR	81	Kenny Bias	Fr
TE	82	David Morgan	Fr
WR	83	Mike Wilburn	Fr
WR	84	Brandon Freeman	Fr
TE	85	Jeremiah Moeller	So
WR	86	Seth Grubb	Fr
TE	87	Jay Kazen	Jr
WR	88	Cody Seaber	Fr
WR	89	Sean Luchnick	Jr

Defense

Pos.	#	Name	Class
CB	2	Jeremy Hall (injured)	Fr
CB	3	Alondre Thorn	Fr
CB	4	Crosby Adams	Fr
CB	11	Malcolm Scott	Fr
S	13	Jake Smith	Fr
S	14	Triston Wade	Fr
CB	17	Erik Brown	So
LB	19	De’Metrius Jacobs	Fr
S	20	Mauricio Sanchez	Fr
S	22	Nic Johnston (C)	Fr
LB	23	John Walker III	Fr
CB	24	Darrien Starling	Fr
S	25	Mark Waters (C)	Fr
S	29	Adefemi Adekeye	Fr
S	31	Joseph Lizcano	Fr
LB	32	Drew Douglas (injured)	Fr
S	33	Miguellino Byrd	Fr
CB	35	Xaviar Archangel	So
S	37	Lekenwic Haynes (injured)	Jr
S	38	Shane Jones	Fr
DE	40	William Ritter (injured)	So
CB	42	Godwin Wyche II	Fr
S	43	Cody Rogers	Fr
LB	44	Steven Kurfehs (C)	So
DE	45	Marlon Smith (C)	Jr
DE	49	Dominique Henderson	Fr
LB	52	Blake Terry	Fr
LB	53	Brandon Reeves	Jr
DT	58	Ferrington Macon	Fr
DT	61	Richard Burge	Fr
DT	64	Franky Anaya	Jr
DE	89	Kristian Bryant	Fr
DE	90	John Roper	Fr
DE	93	Cory Williams	Jr
DE	96	Jason Neill	Fr
DT	97	Ashaad Mabry	Fr
DT	98	Leighton Gilbert	Fr

Special teams

Pos.	#	Name	Class
PK, P	47	Josh Ward	Fr
PK	48	Clay Williaford	Fr
DS	59	Jesse Medrano	Fr
PK, P	92	Sean Ianno	Fr
PK	95	Kristian Stern	Fr

Head coach

- Larry Coker

Coordinators/assistant coaches

- Travis Bush
  Offensive coordinator/quarterbacks
- Neal Neathery
  Defensive coordinator/linebackers
- Kevin Brown
  Tight ends
- Perry Eliano
  Safeties
- Polo Gutierrez
  Runningbacks
- Tony Jeffery
  Special teams coordinator/Receivers
- Nathaniel Jones
  Cornerbacks
- Jim Marshall
  Offensive linemen
- Eric Roark
  Defensive linemen
- Shane Elder
  Director of operations

Legend

- (C) Team captain
- (S) Suspended
- (I) Ineligible
- Injured
- Redshirt

Roster

=== Depth chart ===
Defense

S
Mauricio Sanchez
Adefemi Adekey

FS
Mark Waters
Triston Wade

WLB	SLB
⋅	⋅
⋅	⋅

SS
Nic Johnston
Cody Rogers

CB
Darrien Starling
Jeremy Hall

DE	DT	DT	DE
Jason Neill	Franky Anaya	Ferrington Macon	Marlon Smith
Dominique Henderson	Richard Burge	Ashaad Mabry	William Ritter

CB
Alondre Thorn
Crosby Adams

Offense

WR
Brandon Freeman
Mike Wilburn

SLOT
Brandon Armstrong
Kenny Harrison

LT	LG	C	RG	RT
Drew Phillips	Payton Rion	Nate Leonard	Scott Inskeep	Cody Harris
James Bakke	Darius Anderson	Mike Sanchez	Brady Brown	Josh Walker

TE
Jay Kazen
David Morgan

WR
Kam Jones
Jake Wannamaker

QB
Eric Soza
John Simmons

RB
Chris Johnson
David Glasco II

Special teams
PK Sean Ianno
PK Kristian Stern
P Josh Ward
KR Brandon Armstrong
PR Kam Jones
LS Jesse Medrano
H Seth Grubb

== Game summaries ==
=== McMurry ===
McMurry War Hawks at UTSA Roadrunners – Game summary

Quarter	1	2	3	4	Total
War Hawks	3	7	0	14	24
Roadrunners	0	0	14	7	21

at Alamodome, San Antonio, Texas

- Date: September 10
- Game time: 1:00 p.m. CDT
- Game weather: None (indoor stadium)
- Game attendance: 31,634
- Referee: Robert Cameron
- TV: LHN

Game information
First quarter
- MCM – Jessie Garcia 31-yard field goal, 13:08. War Hawks 3–0. Drive: 7 plays, 63 yards, 1:52.

Second quarter

- MCM – Jake Mullin 1-yard run (Jessie Garcia kick), 13:14. War Hawks 10–0. Drive: 13 plays, 86 yards, 4:36.

Third quarter

- UTSA – CheRod Simpson 22-yard pass from Eric Soza (Sean Ianno kick), 11:29. War Hawks 10–7. Drive: 7 plays, 65 yards, 3:31.
- UTSA – Brandon Freeman 13-yard pass from Eric Soza (Sean Ianno kick), 3:07. Roadrunners 14–10. Drive: 2 plays, 58 yards, 0:29.

Fourth quarter

- MCM – Markell Rice 8-yard blocked punt return (Jessie Garcia kick), 7:07. War Hawks 17–14.
- UTSA – David Glasco II 7-yard run (Sean Ianno kick), 3:02. Roadrunners 21–17. Drive: 5 plays, 46 yards, 2:25.
- MCM – Delfonte Diamond 32-yard pass from Jake Mullin (Jesse Garcia kick), 0:19. War Hawks 24–21. Drive: 7 plays, 82 yards, 2:43.

Statistics	MCM	UTSA
First downs	16	26
Total yards	375	487
Rushing yards	3	232
Passing yards	372	255
Turnovers	2	1
Time of possession	26:08	33:52

Team	Category	Player	Statistics
McMurry	Passing	Jake Mullin	29/45, 372 yards, TD, INT
McMurry	Rushing	Justin Johnson	10 rushes, 26 yards
McMurry	Receiving	Delfonte Diamond	7 receptions, 142 yards, TD
UTSA	Passing	Eric Soza	15/28, 255 yards, 2 TD, INT
UTSA	Rushing	Eric Soza	12 rushes, 51 yards
UTSA	Receiving	Kam Jones	1 reception, 51 yards

=== At Southern Utah ===
UTSA Roadrunners at Southern Utah Thunderbirds – Game summary

Quarter	1	2	3	4	Total
Roadrunners	7	0	7	8	22
Thunderbirds	14	14	10	7	45

at Eccles Coliseum, Cedar City, Utah

- Date: September 17
- Game time: 7:00 p.m. CDT/6:00 p.m. MDT
- Game weather: Partly cloudy, 68 °F (20 °C)
- Game attendance: 8,683
- Referee: Jim Farmer
- TV: KMYU

Game information
First quarter
- UTSA – David Morgan 10-yard pass from Eric Soza (Sean Ianno kick), 8:43. Roadrunners 7–0. Drive: 12 plays, 76 yards, 6:17.
- SUU – Deckar Alexander 26-yard pass from Brad Sorensen (Colton Cook kick), 3:20. Tied 7–7. Drive: 11 plays, 80 yards, 5:23.
- SUU – Austin Minefee 14-yard run (Colton Cook kick), 1:08. Thunderbirds 14–7. Drive: 2 plays, 18 yards, 0:51.

Second quarter

- SUU – Austin Minefee 1-yard run (Colton Cook kick), 6:38. Thunderbirds 21–7. Drive: 12 plays, 84 yards, 4:29.
- SUU – Jared Ursua 3-yard pass from Brad Sorensen (Colton Cook kick), 0:16. Thunderbirds 28–7. Drive: 9 plays, 66 yards, 3:59.

Third quarter

- SUU – Dion Turner 33-yard interception return (Colton Cook kick), 12:48. Thunderbirds 35–7.
- SUU – Colton Cook 36-yard field goal, 10:32. Thunderbirds 38–7. Drive: 4 plays, 4 yards, 0:47.
- UTSA – David Glasco II 8-yard run (Sean Ianno kick), 6:41. Thunderbirds 38–14. Drive: 10 plays, 73 yards, 3:43.

Fourth quarter

- UTSA – Tevin Williams 9-yard run (Eric Soza pass to Brandon Freeman), 9:46. Thunderbirds 38–22. Drive: 9 plays, 83 yards, 3:19.
- SUU – Jared Ursua 24-yard pass from Brad Sorensen (Sean Ianno kick), 4:55. Thunderbirds 45–22. Drive: 9 plays, 82 yards, 4:45.

Statistics	UTSA	SUU
First downs	22	19
Total yards	294	423
Rushing yards	147	118
Passing yards	147	305
Turnovers	2	1
Time of possession	28:20	31:40

Team	Category	Player	Statistics
UTSA	Passing	Eric Soza	14/28, 141 yards, TD, INT
UTSA	Rushing	Tevin Williams	8 rushes, 49 yards, TD
UTSA	Receiving	Kam Jones	4 receptions, 43 yards
Southern Utah	Passing	Brad Sorensen	20/28, 287 yards, 3 TD
Southern Utah	Rushing	Deckar Alexander	12 rushes, 68 yards
Southern Utah	Receiving	East Pedersen	4 receptions, 76 yards
