= 2011 Stephen F. Austin Lumberjacks football team =

American college football season

2011 Stephen F. Austin Lumberjacks football
- Conference: Southland Conference
- Record: 6–5 (5–2 Southland)
- Head coach: J. C. Harper (5th season)
- Offensive coordinator: Mike Nesbitt (1st season)
- Offensive scheme: Air raid
- Defensive coordinator: David Gibbs (4th season)
- Base defense: Multiple
- Home stadium: Homer Bryce Stadium

2011 Southland Conference football standings
	Conf.			Overall
Team	W		L	W		L
No. 2 Sam Houston State $^	7	–	0	14	–	1
No. 14 Central Arkansas ^	6	–	1	9	–	4
Stephen F. Austin	5	–	2	6	–	5
McNeese State	4	–	3	6	–	5
Northwestern State	3	–	4	5	–	6
Lamar	2	–	5	4	–	7
Southeastern Louisiana	1	–	6	3	–	8
Nicholls State	0	–	7	1	–	10
$ – Conference champion; ^ – FCS playoff participant; Rankings from The Sports Network poll

The 2011 Stephen F. Austin Lumberjacks football team represented Stephen F. Austin State University in the 2011 NCAA Division I FCS football season. The Lumberjacks were led by fifth-year head coach J. C. Harper and played their home games at Homer Bryce Stadium. They are a member of the Southland Conference. They finished the season 6–5, 4–2 in Southland play to finish in third place.

== Schedule ==
Date	Time	Opponent	Rank	Site	TV	Result	Attendance
September 1	6:00 pm	McMurry*	No. 17	Homer Bryce Stadium; Nacogdoches, TX		W 82–6	8,586
September 10	6:00 pm	No. 4 Northern Iowa*	No. 16	Homer Bryce Stadium; Nacogdoches, TX		L 23–34	8,741
September 17	6:00 pm	at No. 24 (FBS) Baylor*	No. 19	Floyd Casey Stadium; Waco, TX		L 0–48^{A}	43,090
September 24	7:00 pm	Texas State*	No. 22	Homer Bryce Stadium; Nacogdoches, TX		L 26–35	9,145
October 1	6:00 pm	at Central Arkansas		Estes Stadium; Conway, AR		L 28–38	11,127
October 8	2:00 pm	vs. No. 11 Sam Houston State		Reliant Stadium; Houston, TX (Battle of the Piney Woods)	SLC TV	L 10–45	25,083
October 22	5:30 pm	at Nicholls State		John L. Guidry Stadium; Thibodaux, LA		W 57–21	5,109
October 29	3:00 pm	McNeese State		Homer Bryce Stadium; Nacogdoches, TX	SLC TV	W 37–17	10,422
November 5	6:00 pm	at Lamar		Provost Umphrey Stadium; Beaumont, TX		W 69–10	11,286
November 12	6:00 pm	Southeastern Louisiana		Homer Bryce Stadium; Nacogdoches, TX		W 28–20	6,841
November 19	2:00 pm	at Northwestern State		Harry Turpin Stadium; Natchitoches, LA (Chief Caddo)		W 33–0	4,563
*Non-conference game; Rankings from The Sports Network Poll released prior to the game; All times are in Central time

- ^A Game was called at the end of the third quarter due to lightning.
