= 2011 Central Arkansas Bears football team =

American college football season

2011 Central Arkansas Bears football

NCAA Division I Second Round, L 14–41 at Montana
- Conference: Southland Conference

Ranking
- Sports Network: No. 15
- FCS Coaches: No. 15
- Record: 9–4 (6–1 Southland)
- Head coach: Clint Conque (12th season)
- Offensive coordinator: Brooks Hollingsworth (8th season)
- Defensive coordinator: Matt Williamson (2nd season)
- Home stadium: Estes Stadium

2011 Southland Conference football standings
	Conf.			Overall
Team	W		L	W		L
No. 2 Sam Houston State $^	7	–	0	14	–	1
No. 14 Central Arkansas ^	6	–	1	9	–	4
Stephen F. Austin	5	–	2	6	–	5
McNeese State	4	–	3	6	–	5
Northwestern State	3	–	4	5	–	6
Lamar	2	–	5	4	–	7
Southeastern Louisiana	1	–	6	3	–	8
Nicholls State	0	–	7	1	–	10
$ – Conference champion; ^ – FCS playoff participant; Rankings from The Sports Network poll

The 2011 Central Arkansas Bears football team represented the University of Central Arkansas as a member of the Southland Conference during the 2011 NCAA Division I FCS football season. Led by 12th-year head coach Clint Conque, the Bears compiled an overall record of 9–4 with a mark of 6–1 in conference play placing second in the Southland. Central Arkansas received an at-large bid into the NCAA Division I FCS Football Championship playoffs, where the Bears defeated Tennessee Tech in the first round before falling to Montana in the second round.

Central Arkansas played home games at Estes Stadium in Conway, Arkansas. Estes Stadium had a new playing surface for 2011, a synthetic turf that is striped purple and gray with black endzones. The field is the third non-green field in NCAA Division I football behind Albertsons Stadium at Boise State University (blue) and Roos Field at Eastern Washington University (red).

== Schedule ==
Date	Time	Opponent	Rank	Site	TV	Result	Attendance
September 1	7:00 pm	Henderson State*	No. 18	Estes Stadium; Conway, AR		W 38–14	12,755
September 10	6:00 pm	at Louisiana Tech*	No. 18	Joe Aillet Stadium; Ruston, LA	ESPN3	L 42–48 ^{OT}	20,652
September 17	6:00 pm	at Sam Houston State	No. 18	Bowers Stadium; Huntsville, TX		L 10–31	9,831
September 24	7:00 pm	at Arkansas State*		ASU Stadium; Jonesboro, AR	KATV	L 24–53	27,918
October 1	6:00 pm	Stephen F. Austin		Estes Stadium; Conway, AR		W 38–28	11,127
October 8	2:00 pm	at Nicholls State		John L. Guidry Stadium; Thibodaux, LA		W 37–31	5,432
October 15	3:00 pm	No. 22 McNeese State		Estes Stadium; Conway, AR (Red Beans and Rice Bowl)	SLC TV	W 21–18	9,528
October 22	3:00 pm	at Lamar		Provost Umphrey Stadium; Beaumont, TX	SLC TV	W 38–24	15,367
October 29	6:00 pm	Southeastern Louisiana^{†}		Estes Stadium; Conway, Ar		W 55–29	10,543
November 5	3:00 pm	at Northwestern State	No. 25	Harry Turpin Stadium; Natchitoches, LA	SLC TV	W 45–20	9,156
November 12	4:00 pm	Texas State*	No. 19	Estes Stadium; Conway, AR		W 23–22	7,724
November 26	2:00 pm	at No. 21 Tennessee Tech*	No. 15	Tucker Stadium; Cookeville, TN (NCAA Division I First Round)	ESPN3	W 34–14	6,115
December 3	1:00 pm	at No. 5 Montana*	No. 15	Washington–Grizzly Stadium; Missoula, MT (NCAA Division I Second Round)	ESPN3	L 14–41	22,005
*Non-conference game; ^{†}Homecoming; Rankings from The Sports Network Poll released prior to the game; All times are in Central time
