= Sam Houston–Texas State football rivalry =

American college football rivalry

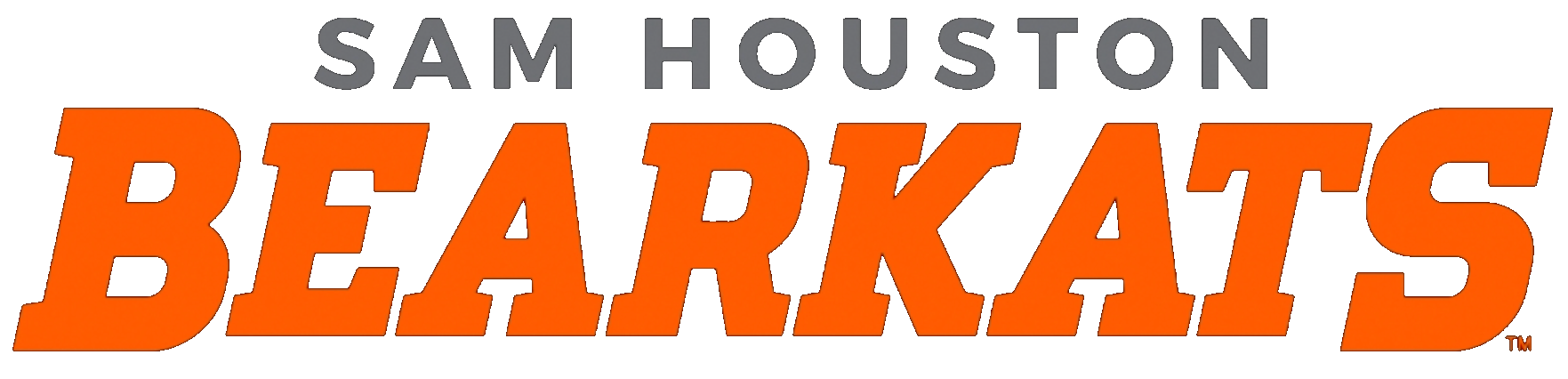
- Sam Houston Bearkats Texas State Bobcats
- First meeting: November 20, 1915; Tied, 0–0
- Latest meeting: September 28, 2024; Sam Houston, 40–39
- Next meeting: TBD

Statistics
- Total meetings: 93
- All-time series: Texas State leads, 50–38–5
- Largest victory: Texas State, 61–0 (1967)
- Longest win streak: Texas State, 7 (1971–1977)
- Current win streak: Sam Houston, 3 (2010–present)

Locations of Texas State and Sam Houston State

The Sam Houston–Texas State football rivalry is a college football rivalry between the Sam Houston Bearkats and the Texas State Bobcats. The rivalry dates back to 1915. From 1915 to 2011, the series was played on an annual basis.

== Series history ==
Historically, Texas State and Sam Houston are old rivals, playing every year from 1915 to 2011. Both were charter members of the Lone Star Conference in 1931 before both moving to the Gulf Star Conference (1984–86) and then the Southland Conference (1987–2011). It ended in 2012, when Texas State joined the Western Athletic Conference in the FBS. The rivalry was renewed in 2024 at NRG Stadium in Houston.

Both schools are founding members of the Texas State University System and have seen their respective university profiles grow nationally during the 21st century. Both have roots as normal schools and have historically competed for students. The schools are separated by 170 miles, about a three hour drive.

The rivalry became notably heated during their time as members of the NCAA Division I Football Championship Subdivision (FCS). The game was traditionally the final of the season for each school during their time in the SLC, often holding conference title and playoff implications. The Bearkats won the final meeting as conference rivals in 2011, beating the Bobcats 36–14 in San Marcos, Texas in front of a sold-out crowd, clinching the Southland Conference title in the process.

The teams met each again for the first time as NCAA Division I Football Bowl Subdivision (FBS) teams in 2024, Texas State as a member of the Sun Belt Conference and Sam Houston State in Conference USA. Sam Houston won the game 40–39 on a game-winning field goal with 6 seconds left after having trailed by 22 points at the end of the first quarter. ESPN would later rate the game at no. 72 on its list of the "100 best college football games of the 2024 season".

Texas State holds the all time series lead 50–38–5.

== Game results ==
Texas State victories	Sam Houston victories

No.	Date	Location	Winner	Score
1	November 15, 1915	San Marcos	Tie	0–0
2	November 18, 1916	Huntsville	Sam Houston Normal	61–0
3	November 17, 1917	San Marcos	Southwest Texas State Normal	12–0
4	October 24, 1918	San Marcos	Southwest Texas State Normal	39–0
5	November 8, 1919	Huntsville	Southwest Texas State Normal	7–0
6	October 22, 1920	San Marcos	Southwest Texas State Normal	32–0
7	October 22, 1921	Huntsville	Southwest Texas State Normal	14–13
8	October 21, 1922	San Marcos	Southwest Texas State Normal	22–0
9	October 20, 1923	Huntsville	Sam Houston State Teachers	6–0
10	October 25, 1924	San Marcos	Southwest Texas State Teachers	13–0
11	November 14, 1925	Huntsville	Sam Houston State Teachers	12–9
12	November 11, 1926	San Marcos	Southwest Texas State Teachers	9–0
13	November 11, 1927	Huntsville	Tie	6–6
14	November 9, 1929	Huntsville	Sam Houston State Teachers	19–0
15	October 30, 1931	San Marcos	Sam Houston State Teachers	6–0
16	November 11, 1932	Huntsville	Southwest Texas State Teachers	6–0
17	November 10, 1933	San Marcos	Southwest Texas State Teachers	3–0
18	November 9, 1934	Huntsville	Sam Houston State Teachers	6–0
19	November 8, 1935	San Marcos	Southwest Texas State Teachers	19–0
20	November 6, 1936	Huntsville	Southwest Texas State Teachers	14–0
21	November 20, 1937	San Marcos	Southwest Texas State Teachers	14–6
22	November 19, 1938	San Marcos	Sam Houston State Teachers	13–7
23	November 17, 1939	Huntsville	Tie	0–0
24	November 16, 1940	San Marcos	Sam Houston State Teachers	19–13
25	November 15, 1941	Huntsville	Southwest Texas State Teachers	29–7
26	November 14, 1942	San Marcos	Sam Houston State Teachers	23–20
27	November 16, 1946	San Marcos	Southwest Texas State Teachers	21–13
28	November 15, 1947	Huntsville	Southwest Texas State Teachers	7–6
29	November 13, 1948	Huntsville	Southwest Texas State Teachers	14–0
30	November 12, 1949	San Marcos	Southwest Texas State Teachers	19–14
31	November 11, 1950	Huntsville	Southwest Texas State Teachers	20–13
32	November 10, 1951	San Marcos	Tie	20–20
33	November 8, 1952	Huntsville	Southwest Texas State Teachers	35–27
34	November 7, 1953	San Marcos	Sam Houston State Teachers	21–13
35	November 13, 1954	San Marcos	Southwest Texas State Teachers	26–22
36	November 12, 1955	San Marcos	Sam Houston State Teachers	16–14
37	November 10, 1956	Huntsville	Sam Houston State Teachers	28–0
38	November 12, 1957	San Marcos	Southwest Texas State Teachers	9–0
39	November 8, 1958	Huntsville	Sam Houston State Teachers	9–0
40	October 31, 1959	San Marcos	Southwest Texas State	18–14
41	October 29, 1960	Huntsville	Sam Houston State Teachers	7–0
42	October 28, 1961	San Marcos	Sam Houston State Teachers	9–7
43	October 27, 1962	Huntsville	Southwest Texas State	21–20
44	November 2, 1963	San Marcos	Southwest Texas State	10–8
45	October 24, 1964	Huntsville	Sam Houston State Teachers	15–14
46	October 23, 1965	San Marcos	Southwest Texas State	17–7
47	October 22, 1966	Huntsville	Sam Houston	27–16

No.	Date	Location	Winner	Score
48	October 21, 1967	San Marcos	Southwest Texas State	61–0
49	October 26, 1968	Huntsville	Southwest Texas State	31–15
50	October 25, 1969	San Marcos	Southwest Texas State	24–21
51	October 24, 1970	Huntsville	Sam Houston	25–24
52	October 23, 1971	San Marcos	Southwest Texas State	10–7
53	October 21, 1972	Huntsville	Southwest Texas State	26–14
54	October 18, 1973	San Marcos	Southwest Texas State	28–7
55	October 26, 1974	Huntsville	Southwest Texas State	20–6
56	October 25, 1975	San Marcos	Southwest Texas State	3–0
57	October 23, 1976	Huntsville	Southwest Texas State	40–10
58	October 15, 1977	San Marcos	Southwest Texas State	16–5
59	October 14, 1978	Huntsville	Sam Houston	21–16
60	October 13, 1979	San Marcos	Southwest Texas State	40–22
61	October 18, 1980	Huntsville	Southwest Texas State	55–7
62	October 17, 1981	San Marcos	Southwest Texas State	38–14
63	October 16, 1982	Houston	Southwest Texas State	52–21
64	October 15, 1983	San Marcos	Southwest Texas State	26–10
65	November 17, 1984	Huntsville	Sam Houston	21–17
66	November 23, 1985	San Marcos	Sam Houston	27–25
67	November 22, 1986	Huntsville	Sam Houston	32–31
68	November 21, 1987	San Marcos	Sam Houston	24–21
69	November 19, 1988	Huntsville	Southwest Texas State	10–3
70	November 18, 1989	San Marcos	Southwest Texas State	24–0
71	November 17, 1990	Huntsville	Sam Houston	26–25
72	November 23, 1991	San Marcos	Sam Houston	20–14
73	November 21, 1992	Huntsville	Tie	22–22
74	November 20, 1993	San Marcos	Sam Houston	35–10
75	November 19, 1994	Huntsville	Sam Houston	34–14
76	November 8, 1995	San Marcos	Sam Houston	26–20
77	November 23, 1996	Huntsville	Sam Houston	29–17
78	November 22, 1997	San Marcos	Sam Houston	35–30
79	November 21, 1998	Huntsville	Sam Houston	31–24
80	November 20, 1999	San Marcos	Southwest Texas State	20–14
81	November 18, 2000	Huntsville	Southwest Texas State	24–17
82	November 17, 2001	San Marcos	Sam Houston	31–13
83	November 23, 2002	Huntsville	Sam Houston	20–14
84	November 22, 2003	San Marcos	Texas State	49–28
85	November 20, 2004	Huntsville	Sam Houston	27–9
86	November 19, 2005	San Marcos	Texas State	26–23^{OT}
87	November 18, 2006	Huntsville	Texas State	28–21
88	November 15, 2007	San Marcos	Sam Houston	29–28
89	November 22, 2008	Huntsville	Texas State	48–45^{OT}
90	November 21, 2009	San Marcos	Texas State	28–20
91	November 20, 2010	Huntsville	Sam Houston	31–29
92	November 19, 2011	San Marcos	Sam Houston	36–14
93	September 28, 2024	Houston	Sam Houston	40–39
Series: Texas State leads 50–38–5
