= Marlon Smith =

American gridiron football player (born 1989)

Personal information
- Born: September 9, 1989 (age 37) San Antonio, Texas, U.S.
- Height: 6 ft 6 in (198 cm)
- Weight: 245 lb (111 kg; 17 st 7 lb)
- Football career

Profile
- Position: Defensive lineman

Career information
- High school: San Antonio (TX) Wagner
- College: UTSA (2011)

Career history
- Ottawa Redblacks (2014–2016); San Antonio Commanders (2019)*
- * Offseason or practice squad member only

Sport
- Basketball career

Career information
- College: St. Mary's (TX) (2008–2009)

Marlon Lamont Smith (born September 9, 1989) is an American former professional football defensive lineman who played three seasons in the Canadian Football League (CFL) for the Ottawa Redblacks from 2014 to 2016.

== College career ==
Smith played one year of college basketball for the St. Mary's Rattlers in the 2008–09 season.

He played college football for the UTSA Roadrunners, leading the team in sacks for the 2011 season. In August 2012, Smith left the UTSA football team due to a violation of team rules.

== Professional career ==
Smith signed with the Ottawa Redblacks in 2014.
