= 2011 Sam Houston State Bearkats football team =

American college football season

2011 Sam Houston State Bearkats football

Southland champion

FCS Championship Game, L 6–17 vs. North Dakota State
- Conference: Southland Conference

Ranking
- Sports Network: No. 2
- FCS Coaches: No. 2
- Record: 14–1 (7–0 Southland)
- Head coach: Willie Fritz (2nd season)
- Offensive coordinator: Bob DeBesse (2nd season)
- Offensive scheme: Multiple pistol
- Defensive coordinator: Scott Stoker (3rd season)
- Base defense: 3–3–5
- Home stadium: Bowers Stadium

2011 Southland Conference football standings
	Conf.			Overall
Team	W		L	W		L
No. 2 Sam Houston State $^	7	–	0	14	–	1
No. 14 Central Arkansas ^	6	–	1	9	–	4
Stephen F. Austin	5	–	2	6	–	5
McNeese State	4	–	3	6	–	5
Northwestern State	3	–	4	5	–	6
Lamar	2	–	5	4	–	7
Southeastern Louisiana	1	–	6	3	–	8
Nicholls State	0	–	7	1	–	10
$ – Conference champion; ^ – FCS playoff participant; Rankings from The Sports Network poll

The 2011 Sam Houston State Bearkats football team represented Sam Houston State University in the 2011 NCAA Division I FCS football season. The Bearkats were led by second year head coach Willie Fritz and played their home games at Bowers Stadium. They are a member of the Southland Conference. They finished the season 14–1, 7–0 in Southland play to win the conference championship. They received the conference's automatic bid into the FCS Playoffs where they advanced to the National Championship Game before falling to North Dakota State 6–17.

== Schedule ==
Date	Time	Opponent	Rank	Site	TV	Result	Attendance
September 1	6:00 pm	Western Illinois*		Bowers Stadium; Huntsville, TX	SLCTV	W 20–6	6,020
September 17	7:00 pm	No. 18 Central Arkansas		Bowers Stadium; Huntsville, TX		W 31–10	9,831
September 24	5:00 pm	at New Mexico*	No. 20	University Stadium; Albuquerque, NM		W 48–45 ^{OT}	16,313
October 1	6:00 pm	UTSA*	No. 16	Bowers Stadium; Huntsville, TX		W 22–7	6,889
October 8	2:00 pm	vs. Stephen F. Austin	No. 11	Reliant Stadium; Houston, TX (Battle of the Piney Woods)	SLCTV	W 45–10	25,083
October 15	2:00 pm	Nicholls State^{†}	No. 10	Bowers Stadium; Huntsville, TX		W 47–7	6,483
October 22	7:00 pm	at McNeese State	No. 7	Cowboy Stadium; Lake Charles, LA		W 38–14	12,742
October 29	2:00 pm	Lamar	No. 6	Bowers Stadium; Huntsville, TX	KBTV	W 66–0	6,575
November 5	7:00 pm	at Southeastern Louisiana	No. 4	Strawberry Stadium; Hammond, LA		W 38–9	4,871
November 12	2:00 pm	Northwestern State	No. 3	Bowers Stadium; Huntsville, TX	ESPN GamePlan	W 43–17	6,643
November 19	3:30 pm	at Texas State*	No. 2	Bobcat Stadium; San Marcos, TX (rivalry)		W 36–14	15,613
December 3	2:00 pm	No. 22 Stony Brook*	No. 1	Bowers Stadium; Huntsville, TX (NCAA Division I Second Round)	ESPN3	W 34–27	8,161
December 10	11:00 am	No. 7 Montana State*	No. 1	Bowers Stadium; Huntsville, TX (NCAA Division I Quarterfinal)	ESPN	W 49–13	9,077
December 16	7:00 pm	No. 5 Montana*	No. 1	Bowers Stadium; Huntsville, TX (NCAA Division I Semifinal)	ESPN	W 31–28	12,367
January 7	12:00 pm	vs. No. 4 North Dakota State*	No. 1	Pizza Hut Park; Frisco, TX (NCAA Division I Football Championship Game)	ESPN2	L 6–17	20,086
*Non-conference game; ^{†}Homecoming; Rankings from The Sports Network Poll released prior to the game; All times are in Central time
