= 2011 Nicholls State Colonels football team =

American college football season

2011 Nicholls State Colonels football
- Conference: Southland Conference
- Record: 1–10 (0–7 Southland)
- Head coach: Charlie Stubbs (2nd season)
- Offensive scheme: Multiple pro-style
- Defensive coordinator: Jeremy Atwell (3rd season)
- Base defense: 3–4
- Home stadium: John L. Guidry Stadium

2011 Southland Conference football standings
	Conf.			Overall
Team	W		L	W		L
No. 2 Sam Houston State $^	7	–	0	14	–	1
No. 14 Central Arkansas ^	6	–	1	9	–	4
Stephen F. Austin	5	–	2	6	–	5
McNeese State	4	–	3	6	–	5
Northwestern State	3	–	4	5	–	6
Lamar	2	–	5	4	–	7
Southeastern Louisiana	1	–	6	3	–	8
Nicholls State	0	–	7	1	–	10
$ – Conference champion; ^ – FCS playoff participant; Rankings from The Sports Network poll

The 2011 Nicholls State Colonels football team represented Nicholls State University as a member of the Southland Conference during the 2011 NCAA Division I FCS football season. Led by second-year head coach Charlie Stubbs, the Colonels compiled an overall record of 1–10 with a mark of 0–7 in conference play, placing last out of six teams in the Southland. Nicholls State played home games at John L. Guidry Stadium in Thibodaux, Louisiana.

== Schedule ==
Date	Time	Opponent	Site	TV	Result	Attendance
September 1	6:30 pm	Evangel*	John L. Guidry Stadium; Thibodaux, LA		W 42–0	2,489
September 10	8:00 pm	at Western Michigan*	Waldo Stadium; Kalamazoo, MI		L 7–38	19,884
September 17	6:00 pm	at Louisiana–Lafayette*	Cajun Field; Lafayette, LA	ESPN3	L 21–38	28,741
September 24	3:00 pm	Northwestern State	John L. Guidry Stadium; Thibodaux, LA (NSU Challenge)	SLCTV	L 0–34	5,781
October 1	6:00 pm	at Texas State*	Bobcat Stadium; San Marcos, TX (Battle for the Paddle)		L 12–38	15,502
October 8	2:00 pm	Central Arkansas	John L. Guidry Stadium; Thibodaux, LA		L 31–37	5,432
October 15	2:00 pm	at No. 10 Sam Houston State	Bowers Stadium; Huntsville, TX		L 7–47	6,483
October 22	5:30 pm	Stephen F. Austin^{†}	John L. Guidry Stadium; Thibodaux, LA		L 21–57	5,109
November 5	7:00 pm	at McNeese State	Cowboy Stadium; Lake Charles, LA		L 17–26	10,162
November 12	5:30 pm	Lamar	John L. Guidry Stadium; Thibodaux, LA	WHNO	L 26–34	5,466
November 17	7:00 pm	at Southeastern Louisiana	Strawberry Stadium; Hammond, LA (River Bell Classic)	CST	L 14–31	4,942
*Non-conference game; ^{†}Homecoming; Rankings from The Sports Network Poll released prior to the game; All times are in Central time
