= 2011 South Alabama Jaguars football team =

American college football season

2011 South Alabama Jaguars football
- Conference: Independent
- Record: 6–4
- Head coach: Joey Jones (3rd season)
- Offensive coordinator: Greg Gregory (3rd season)
- Offensive scheme: Multiple
- Defensive coordinator: Bill Clark (3rd season)
- Base defense: Multiple 3–4
- Home stadium: Ladd–Peebles Stadium

2011 NCAA Division I FCS independents football standings
	Conf.			Overall
Team	W		L	W		L
South Alabama		–		6	–	4
Texas State		–		6	–	6
UTSA		–		4	–	6
Georgia State		–		3	–	8

The 2011 South Alabama Jaguars football team represented the University of South Alabama in the 2011 NCAA Division I FCS football season. This was the third season in program's history. They were led by head coach Joey Jones and played their home games at Ladd–Peebles Stadium. This was their first and final season as an FCS independent before joining the Sun Belt Conference of the Football Bowl Subdivision in 2012; it would also be their first season in which all of their opponents were other Division I teams (they had played mostly lower division teams in 2010 and prep schools and junior colleges during their inaugural season in 2009). They finished the season 6–4.

== Schedule ==
Date	Time	Opponent	Site	TV	Result	Attendance
September 1	6:00 p.m.	West Alabama	Ladd–Peebles Stadium; Mobile, AL	WJTC/ESPN3	W 20–10	21,158
September 10	4:00 p.m.	Lamar	Ladd–Peebles Stadium; Mobile, AL (Hall of Fame Game)		W 30–8	18,136
September 17	5:00 p.m.	at NC State	Carter–Finley Stadium; Raleigh, NC	ESPN3	L 13–35	56,756
September 24	2:30 p.m.	at Kent State	Dix Stadium; Kent, OH		L 25–33	13,352
October 8	4:30 p.m.	at UTSA	Alamodome; San Antonio, TX	Longhorn Network	W 30–27 ^{2OT}	32,886
October 15	2:30 p.m.	UT Martin^{†}	Ladd–Peebles Stadium; Mobile, AL	CSS/WJTC/ESPN3	W 33–30	24,582
October 22	2:00 p.m.	at Georgia State	Georgia Dome; Atlanta, GA		L 20–27 ^{OT}	14,086
October 29	4:00 p.m.	Henderson State	Ladd–Peebles Stadium; Mobile, AL		W 28–3	14,692
November 3	6:30 p.m.	Mississippi Valley State	Ladd–Peebles Stadium; Mobile, AL		W 35–3	13,807
November 19	4:00 p.m.	Cal Poly	Ladd–Peebles Stadium; Mobile, AL	WJTC/ESPN3	L 10–41	18,279
^{†}Homecoming; All times are in Central time

Schedule source

== Game summaries ==
=== West Alabama ===
Team	1	2	3	4	Total
West Alabama Tigers	7	0	0	3	10
• South Alabama Jaguars	7	0	6	7	20

- Location: Mobile, Alabama
- Game start: 6:30 p.m.
- Elapsed time: 2:50
- Game attendance: 21,158
- Game weather: Overcast
- Referee: Jeff Hilyer
- Television network: WJTC/ESPN3

The Jaguars opened the 2011 season at home against the West Alabama Tigers of the Gulf South Conference. The meeting was the first all-time against the Tigers. This was South Alabama's first televised game on local station WJTC and ESPN3.

South Alabama defeated West Alabama 21–10 on Thursday night in the season opener for both teams, improving to 18–0 since starting its football program in 2009. Before the game, starting running backs Kendall Houston and Demetre Baker, as well as wide receiver Corey Besteda and freshman linebacker Desmond LaVelle, were suspended for the first 2 quarters of the game for violating team rules.

Kendall Houston scored two touchdowns on runs of 2 and 10 yards in the second half for the Jaguars, who broke a 7–7 halftime tie. The Jaguars rushed for 205 yards but quarterback C.J. Bennett threw three interceptions. Gary Johnston led the Tigers with 72 yards and a touchdown, but was intercepted twice and sacked twice. Trailing 13–7, West Alabama cut the lead to 13–10 on a 22-yard field goal by Ryne Smith with 10:58 remaining. Houston's second touchdown with 8:13 left put the game out of reach.

=== Lamar ===
Hall of Fame Game

Team	1	2	3	4	Total
Lamar Cardinals	0	0	2	6	8
• South Alabama Jaguars	0	20	7	3	30

- Location: Mobile, Alabama
- Game start: 4:00 p.m.
- Elapsed time: 2:54
- Game attendance: 18,136
- Game weather: Sunny
- Referee: Tony Backert

C.J. Bennett threw two touchdown passes as South Alabama defeated Lamar 30–8. Lamar was held to three first downs and 64 yards on offense in the first half as South Alabama scored three times in the second quarter for a 20–0 halftime lead. Bennett passed 10 yards to Corey Waldon in the second quarter and 10 yards to Jereme Jones in the third as the Jaguars built a 27–2 lead. Bennett completed 9 of 14 passes for 144 yards. The Jaguars have beaten Lamar by a combined score of 56–8 in their past two meetings.

=== NC State ===
Team	1	2	3	4	Total
South Alabama Jaguars	3	0	7	3	13
• North Carolina State Wolfpack	7	7	14	7	35

- Location: Raleigh, North Carolina
- Game start: 6:00 p.m.
- Elapsed time: 2:55
- Game attendance: 56,756
- Game weather: Light Drizzle
- Referee: David Epperly
- Television network: ESPN3

South suffered its first loss in program history when the Jaguars fell 35–13 to NC State in Raleigh, North Carolina. South Alabama kept things competitive into the third quarter of its 35–13 loss to North Carolina State before allowing the Wolfpack's Mike Glennon to throw a career-high four touchdown passes. Demetre Baker had an 8-yard scoring run and Jordan Means kicked two field goals, including a school-record 46-yarder, for the Jaguars. C.J. Bennett finished 17 of 32 for 182 yards with two interceptions and Kendall Houston rushed for 117 yards.

=== Kent State ===
Team	1	2	3	4	Total
South Alabama Jaguars	0	0	17	8	25
• Kent State Golden Flashes	7	19	7	0	33

- Location: Kent, Ohio
- Game start: 2:30 p.m.
- Elapsed time: 3:14
- Game attendance: 13,352
- Game weather: Partly Cloudy
- Referee: Anthony Cannell

South Alabama suffered its second loss in the season and second loss in program history, falling short of Kent State 33–25. The Golden Flashes led the Jaguars 26-0 going into halftime. In the second half, after a quick score by Kent State to go up 33–0, South Alabama's offense clicked on and scored 25 unanswered points. The Jaguars had the ball with less than a minute left in the game but came up short. The game finished with a score of 33–25. C.J. Bennett ended the game with 281 yards in the air with 1 TD pass and 3 interceptions. Bryant Lavender was Bennett's favorite target, catching 5 passes for a total of 97 yards. Demetre Baker had 10 rushes for 28 yards and 2 TDs. Kendall Houston ended the game with a miserly 23 yards on 11 rushes.

=== UTSA ===
Team	1	2	3	4	OT	2OT	Total
• South Alabama Jaguars	7	3	7	0	7	6	30
UTSA Roadrunners	0	17	0	0	7	3	27

- Location: San Antonio, Texas
- Game start: 4:30 p.m.
- Elapsed time: 3:12
- Game attendance: 32,886
- Game weather: Indoors
- Referee: Bill Athan
- Television network: Longhorn Network

Demetre Baker ran for 87 yards and two touchdowns, including the game winner in double overtime, to lift South Alabama to a 30–27 victory over Texas-San Antonio in South's first overtime game. Kendall Houston finished with 72 yards rushing and a touchdown for the Jaguars. C.J. Bennett finished 11 of 17 passing, throwing for one touchdown score.

=== UT Martin ===
Homecoming

Team	1	2	3	4	Total
UT Martin Skyhawks	7	0	6	17	30
• South Alabama Jaguars	6	10	17	0	33

- Location: Mobile, Alabama
- Game start: 2:30 p.m.
- Elapsed time: 3:34
- Game attendance: 24,582
- Game weather: Sunny
- Referee: Kevin Stine
- Television network: CSS/WJTC/ESPN3

=== Georgia State ===
Team	1	2	3	4	OT	Total
South Alabama Jaguars	0	7	6	7	0	20
• Georgia State Panthers	7	7	3	3	7	27

- Location: Atlanta, Georgia
- Game start: 2:00 p.m.
- Elapsed time: 3:17
- Game attendance: 14,086
- Game weather: Indoor
- Referee: Dennis Donovan

=== Henderson State ===
Team	1	2	3	4	Total
Henderson State Reddies	0	0	3	0	3
• South Alabama Jaguars	16	12	0	0	28

- Location: Mobile, Alabama
- Game start: 4:00 p.m.
- Elapsed time: 3:04
- Game attendance: 14,692
- Game weather: Sunny
- Referee: Jason McArthur

=== Mississippi Valley State ===
Team	1	2	3	4	Total
Mississippi Valley State Delta Devils	0	0	3	0	3
• South Alabama Jaguars	14	7	14	0	35

- Location: Mobile, Alabama
- Game start: 6:30 p.m.
- Elapsed time: 2:52
- Game attendance: 13,807
- Game weather: Partly Cloudy
- Referee: Steve Marlowe

=== Cal Poly ===
Team	1	2	3	4	Total
• Cal Poly Mustangs	7	10	17	7	41
South Alabama Jaguars	3	0	0	7	10

- Location: Mobile, Alabama
- Game start: 4:00 p.m.
- Elapsed time: 3:14
- Game attendance: 18,279
- Game weather: Mostly Cloudy
- Referee: Chuck Lewis
- Television network: WJTC / ESPN3

== Roster ==
2011 South Alabama Jaguars football roster
Quarterbacks: 2 Myles Gibbon; 4 Logan Rogers; 14 Kolt Peavey; 15 C.J. Bennett; 16 Trey Fetner; Running backs: 13 Ellis Hill; 21 J.J. Keels; 22 Ryan Scott; 27 Devin Robinson; 29 Kendall Houston; 33 Demetre Baker; 34 Santuan McGee; 46 Brandon Ross; 48 Julien Valentin; Wide receivers: 3 Jared Palmer; 7 Lamontis Garder; 8 Bryant Lavender; 9 Corey Besteda; 10 Greg Hollinger; 11 Jeremé Jones; 20 Nathan Sassaman; 23 Tyrome Bivins; 24 T.J. Glover; 25 Michael Nevels; 26 Donte Rome; 35 Anthony Ingram; 80 Taylor Noon; 81 Corey Waldon; 83 Jared Palmer; 86 Jake Howton; 88 Ben Whiteside; Tight ends: 5 Paul Bennett; 6 Kennedy Helms; 12 Kevin Helms; 41 Robert Terrell; 44 Ryan Onkka; 47 Rush Hendricks; 49 Corey McCarron; 84 Ryne Baxter; 85 Robby Stoner	Offensive linemen: 51 Chris Brunson; 54 Jon Griffin; 55 Chris May; 57 Tremain Smith; 60 Ryan Capers; 63 DaMon Husband; 64 Ryan Norris; 66 Josh Terry; 68 Shane Doty; 69 Brian Krauskopf; 70 Trey Clark; 72 Drew Dearman; 73 Shaun Artz; 76 Ucambre Williams; 77 Melvin Meggs; 78 Kenneth Johnson; 79 Taylor Malone; Defensive linemen: 12 Ceasare Johnson; 43 Anthony Taylor; 45 Justin Walker; 55 Ashton Rivers; 67 Jesse Kelley; 77 Trevor Barry; 82 Alex Page; 86 Will Thompson; 87 Caleb Cochran; 90 Romelle Jones; 92 Montavious Williams; 93 Randon Carnathan; 95 Rodney Thomas; 98 Andy Dalgleish	Linebackers: 19 Cori Barnett; 25 Clifton Crews; 26 Desmond Jones; 28 Enrique Williams; 30 Cordivido Grice; 33 Maleki Harris; 35 David Hawkins; 36 Logan Bennett; 38 Bryson James; 39 Dylan Hutto; 42 Jake Johnson; 50 Ben Giles; 53 Blake Houston; 56 Desmond LaVelle; 57 Ramon Lewis; 58 Philip Press; 59 Andrew Philon; 99 Byron Sneed; Defensive backs: 1 B.J. Scott (S); 2 Jeremy Roberts (CB); 3 Ameriol Finley (S); 4 Damond Smith (CB); 6 Gabe Loper (S); 7 E.J. May (CB); 8 T.J. Lawrence (CB); 9 Ken Barefield (S); 10 Carl Williams (S); 11 Davin Hawkins (S); 14 Anton Graphenreed (CB); 15 Josh Gregory (S); 16 Coleman Hornaday (S); 17 Alonzo Long (S); 21 Charles Harris (S); 22 Qudarius Ford (CB); 23 Dionté McDuffy (S); 24 Rodger Sims (S); 27 Eddy Cabrera (S); 29 Jaylond Franklin (CB); 37 Travis Brooks (CB); 97 Marquel Gardner (S); Special teams: 19 Jordan Means(K); 39 Michael Chapseaux (K); 40 Scott Garber (P); 42 Joey Hamilton (LS); 61 Austin Cole (LS); 71 Nick Bear (LS); 97 Lawson McGlon (K)	Head coach: Joey Jones; Assistant coaches: Greg Gregory - Offensive Coordinator / Quarterbacks; Bill Clark - Defensive Coordinator; Brian Turner - Defensive Line / Recruiting Coordinator; Tommy Perry - Running Backs / Special Teams Coordinator; Bryant Vincent - Tight Ends / Assistant Special Teams; Ron Antoine - Wide Receivers Coach; Kurt Crain - Linebackers; Chuck Dunn - Outside Linebackers; John Turner - Offensive Line; Duwan Walker - Defenseive Backs; Justin Schwind - Strength & Conditioning Coach

== Season notes ==
- January 19, 2011 - South Alabama received four transfers from several Football Bowl Subdivision teams. On this day, South saw B.J. Scott (Alabama), Demetre Baker (Georgia), and Damond Smith (Western Michigan) enroll for classes.
- January 31, 2011 - Two previously scheduled games, an Oct. 1 game against UC Davis and an Oct. 29 game against Edward Waters College, were dropped from the schedule that originally featured 11 games. The Aggies bought out the final game of their 2-year contract with South Alabama, while South Alabama and Edward Waters mutually agreed to end their 2-year contract early. South moved the game against Henderson State up to Oct. 29 and added a Nov. 3 meeting with Mississippi Valley State.
- May 6, 2011 - Ole Miss transfer Raymond Cotton left the South Alabama football program and transferred to Mississippi Gulf Coast Community College. Cotton was highly thought of and was rumored to be the favorite to be the starting quarterback for the Jaguars in 2011 but a shoulder injury in 2010 and strong competition at the position saw Cotton drop in the depth chart.
- September 1, 2011 - The game between the West Alabama Tigers and South Alabama Jaguars was televised for the first time on local network WJTC and online on ESPN3.
- September 16, 2011 - South suffered its first loss in its short history, falling to NC State. This was South's first game against a Football Bowl Subdivision team.
- September 24, 2011 - South suffered its second consecutive loss in program history, falling to Kent State.
- December 5, 2011 - South relieved Offensive Coordinator Greg Gregory of his duties. A replacement has not been announced.
