= 2011 McNeese State Cowboys football team =

American college football season

2011 McNeese State Cowboys football
- Conference: Southland Conference
- Record: 6–5 (4–3 Southland)
- Head coach: Matt Viator (6th season)
- Co-offensive coordinators: Broderick Fobbs (5th season); Tim Leger (5th season)
- Defensive coordinator: Mike Collins (1st season)
- Home stadium: Cowboy Stadium

2011 Southland Conference football standings
	Conf.			Overall
Team	W		L	W		L
No. 2 Sam Houston State $^	7	–	0	14	–	1
No. 14 Central Arkansas ^	6	–	1	9	–	4
Stephen F. Austin	5	–	2	6	–	5
McNeese State	4	–	3	6	–	5
Northwestern State	3	–	4	5	–	6
Lamar	2	–	5	4	–	7
Southeastern Louisiana	1	–	6	3	–	8
Nicholls State	0	–	7	1	–	10
$ – Conference champion; ^ – FCS playoff participant; Rankings from The Sports Network poll

The 2011 McNeese State Cowboys football team represented McNeese State University as a member of the Southland Conference during the 2011 NCAA Division I FCS football season. Led by sixth-year head coach Matt Viator, the Cowboys compiled an overall record of 6–5 with a mark of 4–3 in conference play, placing fourth in the Southland. McNeese State played home games at Cowboy Stadium in Lake Charles, Louisiana.

== Schedule ==
Date	Time	Opponent	Rank	Site	TV	Result	Attendance
September 3	6:00 pm	at Kansas*	No. 20	Memorial Stadium; Lawrence, KS		L 24–42	41,068
September 17	7:00 pm	Sioux Falls*	No. 23	Cowboy Stadium; Lake Charles, LA		W 31–17	14,342
September 24	7:00 pm	Southeastern Louisiana	No. 19	Cowboy Stadium; Lake Charles, LA		W 48–27	12,455
October 1	6:00 pm	at Northwestern State	No. 18	Harry Turpin Stadium; Natchitoches, LA (rivalry)		W 20–18	10,532
October 8	7:00 pm	Texas State*	No. 15	Cowboy Stadium; Lake Charles, LA		L 14–21	12,194
October 15	3:00 pm	at Central Arkansas	No. 22	Estes Stadium; Conway, AR (Red Beans and Rice Bowl)	SLC TV	L 18–21	9,528
October 22	7:00 pm	No. 7 Sam Houston State		Cowboy Stadium; Lake Charles, LA		L 14–38	12,742
October 29	3:00 pm	at Stephen F. Austin		Homer Bryce Stadium; Nacogdoches, TX	SLC TV	L 17–37	10,422
November 5	7:00 pm	Nicholls State		Cowboy Stadium; Lake Charles, LA		W 26–17	10,162
November 12	7:00 pm	UTSA*		Cowboy Stadium; Lake Charles, LA		W 24–21	11,463
November 19	6:00 pm	at Lamar		Provost Umphrey Stadium; Beaumont, TX (Battle of the Border)		W 45–17	13,901
*Non-conference game; Rankings from The Sports Network Poll released prior to the game; All times are in Central time
