= 2011 McMurry War Hawks football team =

American college football season

2011 McMurry War Hawks football
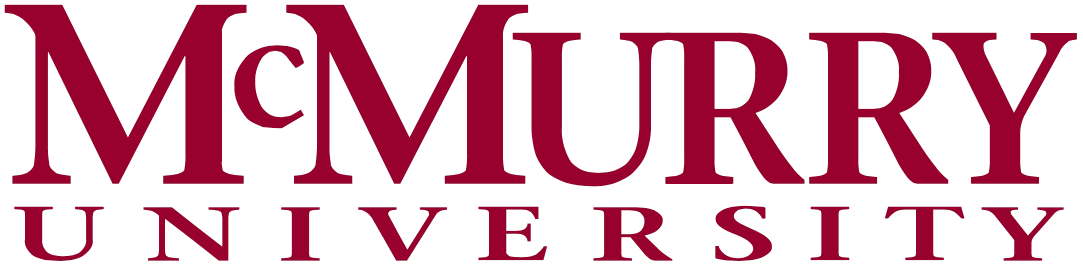

NCAA Division III Second Round, L 20–49 vs. Mary Hardin–Baylor
- Conference: American Southwest Conference

Ranking
- D3Football.com: No. 14
- Record: 9–3 (7–1 ASC)
- Head coach: Hal Mumme (3rd season)
- Offensive coordinator: Mason Miller (1st season)
- Offensive scheme: Air raid
- Defensive coordinator: Joe Lee Dunn (3rd season)
- Base defense: 3–3–5
- Home stadium: Wilford Moore Stadium

2011 American Southwest Conference football standings
	Conf.			Overall
Team	W		L	W		L
No. 5 Mary Hardin–Baylor $^	8	–	0	12	–	1
No. 14 McMurry ^	7	–	1	9	–	3
Louisiana College	5	–	3	7	–	3
Hardin–Simmons	4	–	4	6	–	4
East Texas Baptist	4	–	4	5	–	5
Texas Lutheran	4	–	4	5	–	5
Mississippi College	2	–	6	3	–	7
Sul Ross	1	–	7	2	–	8
Howard Payne	1	–	7	1	–	9
$ – Conference champion; ^ – NCAA Division III playoff participant; Rankings from D3football.com

The 2011 McMurry War Hawks football team represented McMurry University during the 2011 NCAA Division III football season as a member of the American Southwest Conference (ASC). Led by third-year head coach Hal Mumme, the War Hawks played their home games at Wilford Moore Stadium in Abilene, Texas. The War Hawks finished the regular season going 7–1 in ASC play to finish second in the conference. The team received an at-large bid for the NCAA Division III playoffs, making the Division III playoffs for the first time in program history. In the first round, McMurry defeated no. 15 Trinity (TX) before falling to conference foe Mary Hardin–Baylor in the second round.

This was the first year the program competed as the War Hawks. In October 2006, the university announced that its athletic programs would compete without any names after the board of regents voted to drop the old nickname of Indians.

== Preseason ==
=== Media poll ===
The 2011 ASC preseason media poll was released on August 3. The War Hawks were predicted to finish second in the conference.

ASC media poll
Predicted finish	Team	Votes (1st place)
1	Mary Hardin–Baylor	239 (23)
2	McMurry	183 (1)
3	Hardin–Simmons	181
4	Louisiana College	180 (2)
5	Mississippi College	125
6	East Texas Baptist	124 (1)
7	Texas Lutheran	84
8	Howard Payne	51
9	Sul Ross	48

== Schedule ==
Date	Time	Opponent	Rank	Site	Result	Attendance
September 1	6:00 p.m.	at No. 14 (FCS) Stephen F. Austin*		Homer Bryce Stadium; Nacogdoches, TX	L 6–82	8,586
September 10	1:00 p.m.	at UTSA*		Alamodome; San Antonio, TX	W 24–21	31,634
September 17	6:00 p.m.	at No. 3 Mary Hardin–Baylor		Tiger Field; Belton, TX	L 27–28	3,981
September 24	2:00 p.m.	East Texas Baptist		Wilford Moore Stadium; Abilene, TX	W 63–31	2,100
October 1	2:00 p.m.	at Howard Payne		Gordon Wood Stadium; Brownwood, TX	W 50–3	1,225
October 8	2:00 p.m.	Sul Ross^{†}		Wilford Moore Stadium; Abilene, TX (Battle of I-20)	W 41–13	600
October 15	1:00 p.m.	at Texas Lutheran		Matador Stadium; Seguin, TX	W 60–16	845
October 29	2:00 p.m.	Hardin–Simmons		Wilford Moore Stadium; Abilene, TX (Crosstown Showdown)	W 24–14	4,000
November 5	1:00 p.m.	at No. 20 Louisiana College		Wildcat Field; Pineville, LA	W 49–28	2,980
November 12	2:00 p.m.	Mississippi College	No. 20	Wilford Moore Stadium; Abilene, TX	W 63–38	1,700
November 19	12:00 p.m.	at No. 15 Trinity (TX)*	No. 19	Trinity Stadium; San Antonio, TX (NCAA Division III First Round)	W 25–16	1,373
November 26	12:00 p.m.	at No. 4 Mary Hardin–Baylor*	No. 19	Tiger Field; Belton, TX (NCAA Division III Second Round)	L 20–49	2,297
*Non-conference game; ^{†}Homecoming; Rankings from D3football.com Poll released prior to the game; All times are in Central time

== Rankings ==
Ranking movements Legend: ██ Increase in ranking ██ Decrease in ranking — = Not ranked RV = Received votes
	Week												
Poll	Pre	1	2	3	4	5	6	7	8	9	10	11	Final
D3Football.com	RV	—	—	RV	RV	RV	RV	RV	RV	RV	20	19	14

== Game summaries ==
=== At No. 14 (FCS) Stephen F. Austin ===
	1	2	3	4	Total
War Hawks	0	6	0	0	6
No. 14 (FCS) Lumberjacks	31	22	15	14	82

Statistics	MCM	SFA
First downs	8	34
Total yards	128	744
Rushing yards	20	237
Passing yards	108	507
Turnovers	6	3
Time of possession	28:39	31:21

Team	Category	Player	Statistics
McMurry	Passing	Jake Mullin	14/29, 79 yards, INT
McMurry	Rushing	Justin Johnson	8 rushes, 24 yards
McMurry	Receiving	Delfonte Diamond	4 receptions, 37 yards
Stephen F. Austin	Passing	Brady Attaway	27/37, 275 yards, 4 TD, 2 INT
Stephen F. Austin	Rushing	Fred Ford	11 rushes, 178 yards, 2 TD
Stephen F. Austin	Receiving	Ryan Gambel	6 receptions, 85 yards

=== At UTSA ===
	1	2	3	4	Total
War Hawks	3	7	0	14	24
Roadrunners	0	0	14	7	21

Statistics	MCM	UTSA
First downs	16	26
Total yards	375	487
Rushing yards	3	232
Passing yards	372	255
Turnovers	2	1
Time of possession	26:08	33:52

Team	Category	Player	Statistics
McMurry	Passing	Jake Mullin	29/45, 372 yards, TD, INT
McMurry	Rushing	Justin Johnson	10 rushes, 26 yards
McMurry	Receiving	Delfonte Diamond	7 receptions, 142 yards, TD
UTSA	Passing	Eric Soza	15/28, 255 yards, 2 TD, INT
UTSA	Rushing	Eric Soza	12 rushes, 51 yards
UTSA	Receiving	Kam Jones	1 reception, 51 yards

=== At No. 3 Mary Hardin–Baylor ===
	1	2	3	4	Total
War Hawks	6	0	8	13	27
No. 3 Crusaders	7	21	0	0	28

Statistics	MCM	UMHB
First downs	19	26
Total yards	309	461
Rushing yards	21	323
Passing yards	288	138
Turnovers	3	3
Time of possession	28:27	31:33

Team	Category	Player	Statistics
McMurry	Passing	Jake Mullin	35/57, 288 yards, 3 TD, 2 INT
McMurry	Rushing	Justin Johnson	8 rushes, 24 yards
McMurry	Receiving	R. J. Long	9 receptions, 100 yards, TD
Mary Hardin–Baylor	Passing	LiDarral Bailey	12/20, 138 yards, 2 INT
Mary Hardin–Baylor	Rushing	Darius Wilson	30 rushes, 222 yards, TD
Mary Hardin–Baylor	Receiving	Damian Davis	6 receptions, 82 yards

=== East Texas Baptist ===
	1	2	3	4	Total
Tigers	17	0	0	14	31
War Hawks	15	14	21	13	63

Statistics	ETBU	MCM
First downs	15	33
Total yards	319	753
Rushing yards	99	136
Passing yards	220	617
Turnovers	2	4
Time of possession	30:08	29:52

Team	Category	Player	Statistics
East Texas Baptist	Passing	Sed Harris	10/21, 167 yards, TD
East Texas Baptist	Rushing	Jair Stover	17 rushes, 75 yards
East Texas Baptist	Receiving	Al Lewis	2 receptions, 50 yards
McMurry	Passing	Jake Mullin	28/46, 448 yards, 4 TD, 2 INT
McMurry	Rushing	Chris Simpson	5 rushes, 65 yards, TD
McMurry	Receiving	Eric Shaffer	4 receptions, 106 yards

=== At Howard Payne ===
	1	2	3	4	Total
War Hawks	0	13	22	15	50
Yellow Jackets	0	0	3	0	3

Statistics	MCM	HPU
First downs	26	6
Total yards	600	130
Rushing yards	116	130
Passing yards	484	0
Turnovers	4	3
Time of possession	28:28	31:32

Team	Category	Player	Statistics
McMurry	Passing	Jake Mullin	34/42, 430 yards, 4 TD, 2 INT
McMurry	Rushing	Justin Johnson	15 rushes, 127 yards, 2 TD
McMurry	Receiving	R. J. Long	10 receptions, 153 yards, 2 TD
Howard Payne	Passing	Jared Shaw	0/1, 0 yards
Howard Payne	Rushing	Adrian Lighteard	14 rushes, 95 yards
Howard Payne	Receiving	None	

=== Sul Ross ===
	1	2	3	4	Total
Lobos	0	7	6	0	13
War Hawks	23	6	12	0	41

Statistics	SRS	MCM
First downs	4	11
Total yards	90	170
Rushing yards	24	58
Passing yards	66	112
Turnovers	1	1
Time of possession	25:07	20:12

Team	Category	Player	Statistics
Sul Ross	Passing	Scotty Walden	2/7, 66 yards
Sul Ross	Rushing	Dominique Carson	10 rushes, 43 yards, TD
Sul Ross	Receiving	Thomas Sanders	1 reception, 67 yards
McMurry	Passing	Jake Mullin	12/21, 112 yards, 4 TD
McMurry	Rushing	Justin Johnson	6 rushes, 32 yards
McMurry	Receiving	Delfonte Diamond	3 receptions, 32 yards

Kickoff was originally scheduled for 2:00 p.m., but lightning struck just minutes before kickoff. The game would be delayed for nearly six hours then was delayed a second time in the opening minutes of the second quarter. Once play resumed, the coaches agreed to use a running clock. Another lightning strike occurred early in the fourth, ending the game.

=== At Texas Lutheran ===
	1	2	3	4	Total
War Hawks	17	15	7	21	60
Bulldogs	7	9	0	0	16

Statistics	MCM	TLU
First downs	41	17
Total yards	848	297
Rushing yards	171	114
Passing yards	677	183
Turnovers	1	2
Time of possession	34:15	25:45

Team	Category	Player	Statistics
McMurry	Passing	Jake Mullin	43/57, 614 yards, 4 TD
McMurry	Rushing	Chris Simpson	7 rushes, 51 yards
McMurry	Receiving	Delfonte Diamond	12 receptions, 195 yards
Texas Lutheran	Passing	Mitchell Bunger	13/30, 143 yards, TD, 2 INT
Texas Lutheran	Rushing	Dominic Hardaway	9 rushes, 50 yards
Texas Lutheran	Receiving	Ryan Jones	3 receptions, 58 yards, TD

=== Hardin–Simmons ===
	1	2	3	4	Total
Cowboys	7	0	0	7	14
War Hawks	7	10	0	7	24

Statistics	HSU	MCM
First downs	17	24
Total yards	305	443
Rushing yards	129	201
Passing yards	176	242
Turnovers	5	3
Time of possession	23:32	36:28

Team	Category	Player	Statistics
Hardin–Simmons	Passing	Zach Stewart	14/29, 176 yards, 3 INT
Hardin–Simmons	Rushing	Steven Rockwell	17 rushes, 134 yards, TD
Hardin–Simmons	Receiving	Corey Jones	8 receptions, 117 yards
McMurry	Passing	Jake Mullin	27/43, 232 yards, TD, 2 INT
McMurry	Rushing	Justin Johnson	22 rushes, 128 yards
McMurry	Receiving	Delfonte Diamond	6 receptions, 72 yards

=== At No. 20 Louisiana College ===
	1	2	3	4	Total
War Hawks	6	21	6	16	49
No. 20 Wildcats	7	7	7	7	28

Statistics	MCM	LC
First downs	22	25
Total yards	635	528
Rushing yards	104	75
Passing yards	531	454
Turnovers	3	2
Time of possession	27:07	32:53

Team	Category	Player	Statistics
McMurry	Passing	Jake Mullin	25/39, 446 yards, 4 TD, 2 INT
McMurry	Rushing	Justin Johnson	9 rushes, 66 yards, TD
McMurry	Receiving	Delfonte Diamond	6 receptions, 145 yards, TD
Louisiana College	Passing	Jamie Bunting	25/43, 454 yards, 2 TD, INT
Louisiana College	Rushing	Ryan Montague	9 rushes, 27 yards
Louisiana College	Receiving	Darius Williams	9 receptions, 244 yards, TD

=== Mississippi College ===
	1	2	3	4	Total
Choctaws	7	17	0	14	38
No. 20 War Hawks	15	20	21	7	63

Statistics	MC	MCM
First downs	13	28
Total yards	283	455
Rushing yards	171	188
Passing yards	112	267
Turnovers	2	4
Time of possession	27:21	32:39

Team	Category	Player	Statistics
Mississippi College	Passing	Tommy Reyer	9/22, 112 yards, 2 TD, INT
Mississippi College	Rushing	Steven Knight	20 rushes, 118 yards, 2 TD
Mississippi College	Receiving	DeMarrion Bedford-Hughes	5 receptions, 86 yards, 2 TD
McMurry	Passing	Stephen Warren	15/20, 186 yards, 3 TD, 2 INT
McMurry	Rushing	Justin Johnson	22 rushes, 134 yards, 2 TD
McMurry	Receiving	Eric Shaffer	8 receptions, 68 yards, TD

=== At No. 15 Trinity (TX) (NCAA Division III First Round) ===
	1	2	3	4	Total
No. 19 War Hawks	7	0	11	7	25
No. 15 Tigers	7	0	3	6	16

Statistics	MCM	TU
First downs	12	12
Total yards	271	304
Rushing yards	83	44
Passing yards	188	260
Turnovers	5	5
Time of possession	31:43	28:17

Team	Category	Player	Statistics
McMurry	Passing	Stephen Warren	17/34, 188 yards, TD, 2 INT
McMurry	Rushing	Justin Johnson	24 rushes, 64 yards
McMurry	Receiving	Simeon Neal	5 receptions, 99 yards
Trinity	Passing	Nyk McKissic	15/36, 260 yards, TD, 4 INT
Trinity	Rushing	Nyk McKissic	10 rushes, 24 yards
Trinity	Receiving	Hagen Kattner	5 receptions, 95 yards

=== At No. 4 Mary Hardin–Baylor (NCAA Division III Second Round) ===
	1	2	3	4	Total
No. 19 War Hawks	6	6	8	0	20
No. 4 Crusaders	14	14	0	21	49

Statistics	MCM	UMHB
First downs	20	22
Total yards	317	412
Rushing yards	48	260
Passing yards	269	152
Turnovers	5	1
Time of possession	29:21	30:39

Team	Category	Player	Statistics
McMurry	Passing	Jake Mullin	34/60, 269 yards, 3 TD, 3 INT
McMurry	Rushing	Justin Johnson	18 rushes, 52 yards
McMurry	Receiving	Jaret Smith	6 receptions, 56 yards, TD
Mary Hardin–Baylor	Passing	LiDarral Bailey	10/17, 139 yards, TD
Mary Hardin–Baylor	Rushing	LiDarral Bailey	15 rushes, 93 yards, TD
Mary Hardin–Baylor	Receiving	Damian Davis	9 receptions, 120 yards, TD
