= 2011 Southeastern Louisiana Lions football team =

American college football season

2011 Southeastern Louisiana Lions football
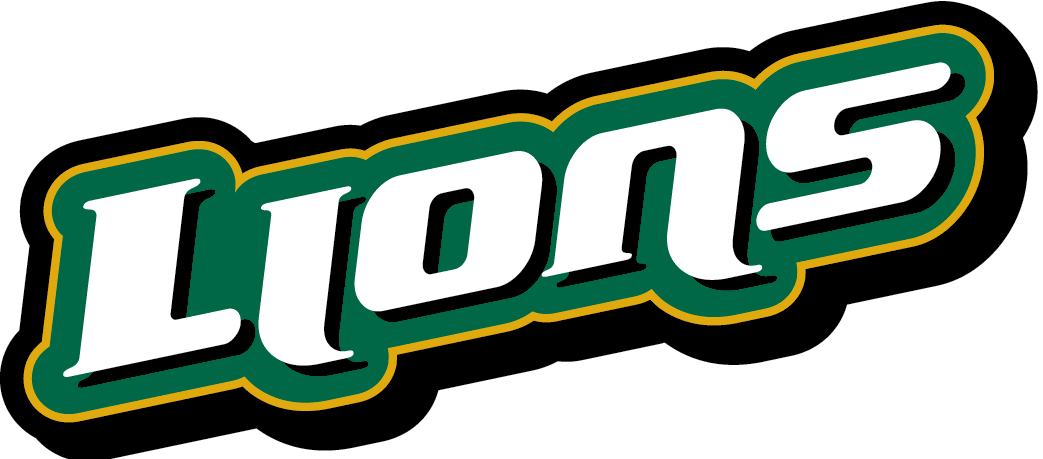
- Conference: Southland Conference
- Record: 3–8 (1–6 Southland)
- Head coach: Mike Lucas (5th season)
- Offensive coordinator: Allen Rudolph (5th overall; 2nd as OC)
- Home stadium: Strawberry Stadium

2011 Southland Conference football standings
	Conf.			Overall
Team	W		L	W		L
No. 2 Sam Houston State $^	7	–	0	14	–	1
No. 14 Central Arkansas ^	6	–	1	9	–	4
Stephen F. Austin	5	–	2	6	–	5
McNeese State	4	–	3	6	–	5
Northwestern State	3	–	4	5	–	6
Lamar	2	–	5	4	–	7
Southeastern Louisiana	1	–	6	3	–	8
Nicholls State	0	–	7	1	–	10
$ – Conference champion; ^ – FCS playoff participant; Rankings from The Sports Network poll

The 2011 Southeastern Louisiana Lions football team represented Southeastern Louisiana University as a member of the Southland Conference during the 2011 NCAA Division I FCS football season. The Lions were led by fifth-year head coach Mike Lucas and played their home games at Strawberry Stadium. They compiled an overall record of 3–8 with a mark of 1–6 in conference play to place seventh in the Southland. At the conclusion of the season, on November 21, Lucas was released from his duties as head coach.

== Schedule ==
Date	Time	Opponent	Site	TV	Result	Attendance
September 3	12:30 pm	at Tulane*	Louisiana Superdome; New Orleans, LA		L 33–47	15,912
September 10	7:00 pm	Savannah State*	Strawberry Stadium; Hammond, LA	Southeastern Channel	W 63–6	4,974
September 17	6:00 pm	at Southern Mississippi*	M. M. Roberts Stadium; Hattiesburg, MS		L 6–52	27,433
September 24	7:00 pm	at No. 19 McNeese State	Cowboy Stadium; Lake Charles, LA		L 27–48	12,455
October 1	3:00 pm	Lamar	Strawberry Stadium; Hammond, LA	SCTN	L 38–48	5,104
October 15	6:00 pm	at Northwestern State	Harry Turpin Stadium; Natchitoches, LA (rivalry)		L 17–51	10,285
October 22	7:00 pm	Texas State*^{†}	Strawberry Stadium; Hammond, LA	Southeastern Channel	W 38–28	4,137
October 29	6:00 pm	at Central Arkansas	Estes Stadium; Conway, AR		L 29–55	10,543
November 5	3:30 pm	No. 4 Sam Houston State	Strawberry Stadium; Hammond, LA		L 9–38	4,871
November 12	6:00 pm	at Stephen F. Austin	Homer Bryce Stadium; Nacogdoches, TX		L 20–28	6,841
November 17	7:00 pm	Nicholls State	Strawberry Stadium; Hammond, LA (River Bell Classic)	CST	W 31–14	4,942
*Non-conference game; ^{†}Homecoming; Rankings from The Sports Network Poll released prior to the game; All times are in Central time
