= 2011 Northwestern State Demons football team =

American college football season

2011 Northwestern State Demons football
- Conference: Southland Conference
- Record: 5–6 (3–4 Southland)
- Head coach: Bradley Dale Peveto (3rd season)
- Offensive coordinator: Todd Cooley (3rd season)
- Defensive coordinator: Brad Laird (7th season)
- Home stadium: Harry Turpin Stadium

2011 Southland Conference football standings
	Conf.			Overall
Team	W		L	W		L
No. 2 Sam Houston State $^	7	–	0	14	–	1
No. 14 Central Arkansas ^	6	–	1	9	–	4
Stephen F. Austin	5	–	2	6	–	5
McNeese State	4	–	3	6	–	5
Northwestern State	3	–	4	5	–	6
Lamar	2	–	5	4	–	7
Southeastern Louisiana	1	–	6	3	–	8
Nicholls State	0	–	7	1	–	10
$ – Conference champion; ^ – FCS playoff participant; Rankings from The Sports Network poll

The 2011 Northwestern State Demons football team represented Northwestern State University as a member of the Southland Conference during the 2011 NCAA Division I FCS football season. Led by third-year head coach Bradley Dale Peveto, the Demons compiled an overall record of 5–6 with a mark of 3–4 in conference play, placing fifth in the Southland. Northwestern State played home games at Harry Turpin Stadium in Natchitoches, Louisiana.

== Schedule ==
Date	Time	Opponent	Site	TV	Result	Attendance
September 1	6:00 pm	Delta State*	Harry Turpin Stadium; Natchitoches, LA		W 24–23	7,531
September 10	7:00 pm	at No. 2 (FBS) LSU*	Tiger Stadium; Baton Rouge, LA		L 3–49	92,405
September 17	7:00 pm	at SMU*	Gerald J. Ford Stadium; University Park, TX		L 7–40	20,083
September 24	3:00 pm	at Nicholls State	John L. Guidry Stadium; Thibodaux, LA (NSU Challenge)	SLC TV	W 34–0	5,781
October 1	6:00 pm	No. 18 McNeese State	Harry Turpin Stadium; Natchitoches, LA (rivalry)		L 18–20	10,532
October 8	6:00 pm	at Lamar	Provost Umphrey Stadium; Beaumont, TX		W 37–17	15,367
October 15	6:00 pm	Southeastern Louisiana^{†}	Harry Turpin Stadium; Natchitoches, LA (rivalry)		W 51–17	10,285
October 29	3:00 pm	at Texas State*	Bobcat Stadium; San Marcos, TX		W 23–10	14,473
November 5	3:00 pm	No. 25 Central Arkansas	Harry Turpin Stadium; Natchitoches, LA	SLC TV	L 20–45	9,156
November 12	2:00 pm	at No. 3 Sam Houston State	Bowers Stadium; Huntsville, TX	ESPN GamePlan	L 17–43	6,643
November 19	2:00 pm	Stephen F. Austin	Harry Turpin Stadium; Natchitoches, LA (Chief Caddo)		L 0–33	4,563
*Non-conference game; ^{†}Homecoming; Rankings from The Sports Network Poll released prior to the game; All times are in Central time
