= 2011 Georgia State Panthers football team =

American college football season

2011 Georgia State Panthers football
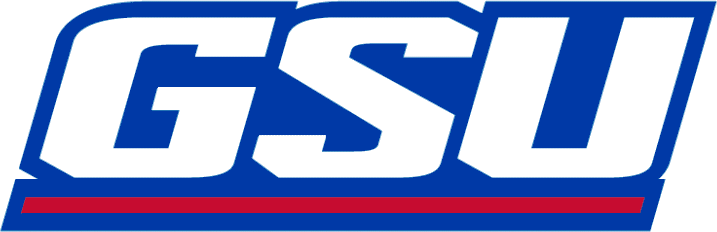
- Conference: Independent
- Record: 3–8
- Head coach: Bill Curry (2nd season)
- Offensive coordinator: John Bond (2nd season)
- Offensive scheme: Spread option
- Defensive coordinator: John Thompson (2nd season)
- Base defense: 3–4
- Home stadium: Georgia Dome

2011 NCAA Division I FCS independents football standings
	Conf.			Overall
Team	W		L	W		L
South Alabama		–		6	–	4
Texas State		–		6	–	6
UTSA		–		4	–	6
Georgia State		–		3	–	8

The 2011 Georgia State Panthers football team represented Georgia State University in the 2011 NCAA Division I FCS football season. The Panthers were led by second year head coach Bill Curry and played their home games at the Georgia Dome. Although Georgia State was a full member of the Colonial Athletic Association (CAA), the Panthers played as an FCS independent. This was their second season in program history and last as an independent. They became a football member of the CAA in 2012. They finished the season with a record of 3–8.

The season was marred by quarterback issues both on and off the field. Drew Little, who was the Panthers' starting quarterback for the 2010 season, was suspended for the first four games of the season and his backup, Kelton Hill, was arrested prior to the season opener. This left punter Bo Schlecter as the Panthers' starting quarterback.

== Schedule ==
Date	Time	Opponent	Site	TV	Result	Attendance	Source
September 2	7:30 p.m.	Clark Atlanta	Georgia Dome; Atlanta, GA		W 41–7	26,273	
September 10	12:00 p.m.	Old Dominion	Georgia Dome; Atlanta, GA	CSS	L 17–40	11,701	
September 17	3:30 p.m.	at No. 17 Jacksonville State	Burgess–Snow Field at JSU Stadium; Jacksonville, AL	CSS	L 21–37	17,618	
September 24	8:00 p.m.	at Houston	Robertson Stadium; Houston, TX	CSS	L 0–56	32,005	
October 8	2:00 p.m.	Murray State	Georgia Dome; Atlanta, GA	ESPN3	L 24–48	10,963	
October 15	1:30 p.m.	at South Carolina State	Oliver C. Dawson Stadium; Orangeburg, SC		L 13–23	11,517	
October 22	3:00 p.m.	South Alabama^{†}	Georgia Dome; Atlanta, GA		W 27–20 ^{OT}	14,086	
October 29	2:00 p.m.	at UTSA	Alamodome; San Antonio, TX	LHN	L 14–17 ^{OT}	25,977	
November 5	2:00 p.m.	St. Francis (IL)	Georgia Dome; Atlanta, GA		L 27–30 ^{OT}	11,565	
November 12	7:00 p.m.	at West Alabama	Tiger Stadium; Livingston, AL		L 23–30	6,253	
November 19	2:00 p.m.	Campbell	Georgia Dome; Atlanta, GA		W 42–35	11,125	
^{†}Homecoming; Rankings from The Sports Network Poll released prior to the game; All times are in Eastern time

== Game summaries ==
=== Clark Atlanta ===
	1	2	3	4	Total
CLK Panthers	0	0	0	7	7
GAST Panthers	3	21	10	7	41

Statistics	CLK	GAST
First downs	12	19
Total yards	247	342
Rushing yards	140	146
Passing yards	107	196
Turnovers	2	0
Time of possession	33:14	26:46

Team	Category	Player	Statistics
Clark Atlanta	Passing	Bryan Mann	6/10, 72 yards, TD, INT
Clark Atlanta	Rushing	Bryan Mann	17 rushes, 88 yards
Clark Atlanta	Receiving	Terrence Milton	3 receptions, 47 yards, TD
Georgia State	Passing	Bo Schlechter	13/18, 196 yards, 3 TD
Georgia State	Rushing	Donald Russell	9 rushes, 56 yards
Georgia State	Receiving	Albert Wilson	3 receptions, 85 yards, 2 TD

=== Old Dominion ===
	1	2	3	4	Total
Monarchs	13	14	6	7	40
Panthers	10	7	0	0	17

Statistics	ODU	GAST
First downs	16	16
Total yards	408	291
Rushing yards	282	85
Passing yards	126	206
Turnovers	2	3
Time of possession	31:22	28:38

Team	Category	Player	Statistics
Old Dominion	Passing	Thomas DeMarco	13/21, 126 yards, TD
Old Dominion	Rushing	Colby Goodwyn	24 rushes, 184 yards, TD
Old Dominion	Receiving	Larry Pinkard	2 receptions, 34 yards
Georgia State	Passing	Bo Schlechter	9/27, 147 yards, INT
Georgia State	Rushing	Travis Evans	15 rushes, 62 yards, TD
Georgia State	Receiving	Jordan Giles	3 receptions, 58 yards

=== At No. 17 Jacksonville State ===
	1	2	3	4	Total
Panthers	7	7	7	0	21
No. 17 Gamecocks	7	7	10	13	37

Statistics	GAST	JVST
First downs	15	21
Total yards	325	401
Rushing yards	116	246
Passing yards	209	155
Turnovers	1	1
Time of possession	24:05	35:55

Team	Category	Player	Statistics
Georgia State	Passing	Bo Schlechter	15/26, 145 yards, TD
Georgia State	Rushing	Donald Russell	13 rushes, 47 yards, TD
Georgia State	Receiving	Albert Wilson	6 receptions, 146 yards
Jacksonville State	Passing	Coty Blanchard	9/11, 155 yards, TD
Jacksonville State	Rushing	Calvin Middleton	20 rushes, 89 yards
Jacksonville State	Receiving	Kevyn Cooper	3 receptions, 75 yards, TD

=== At Houston ===
	1	2	3	4	Total
Panthers	0	0	0	0	0
Cougars	21	14	14	7	56

Statistics	GAST	HOU
First downs	11	34
Total yards	241	732
Rushing yards	108	171
Passing yards	133	561
Turnovers	2	2
Time of possession	31:31	28:29

Team	Category	Player	Statistics
Georgia State	Passing	Drew Little	11/24, 117 yards, INT
Georgia State	Rushing	Travis Evans	14 rushes, 70 yards
Georgia State	Receiving	Danny Williams	4 receptions, 70 yards
Houston	Passing	Case Keenum	29/34, 415 yards, 2 TD
Houston	Rushing	Bryce Beall	7 rushes, 64 yards, 2 TD
Houston	Receiving	Tyron Carrier	5 receptions, 90 yards

=== Murray State ===
	1	2	3	4	Total
Racers	7	21	7	13	48
Panthers	10	0	14	0	24

Statistics	MURR	GAST
First downs	25	22
Total yards	459	367
Rushing yards	138	86
Passing yards	321	281
Turnovers	2	2
Time of possession	29:06	30:54

Team	Category	Player	Statistics
Murray State	Passing	Casey Brockman	35/46, 321 yards, 4 TD, 2 INT
Murray State	Rushing	Tyler Lavea	12 rushes, 85 yards
Murray State	Receiving	Duane Brady	7 receptions, 91 yards, TD
Georgia State	Passing	Drew Little	17/38, 228 yards, 2 INT
Georgia State	Rushing	Donald Russell	17 rushes, 64 yards, 2 TD
Georgia State	Receiving	Danny Williams	9 receptions, 151 yards, TD

=== At South Carolina State ===
	1	2	3	4	Total
Panthers	0	6	7	0	13
Bulldogs	3	0	10	10	23

Statistics	GAST	SCST
First downs	15	17
Total yards	320	368
Rushing yards	244	155
Passing yards	76	213
Turnovers	3	0
Time of possession	31:58	28:02

Team	Category	Player	Statistics
Georgia State	Passing	Bo Schlechter	4/11, 52 yards, 2 INT
Georgia State	Rushing	Kelton Hill	16 rushes, 94 yards
Georgia State	Receiving	Albert Wilson	2 receptions, 42 yards
South Carolina State	Passing	Richard Cue	16/30, 213 yards
South Carolina State	Rushing	Asheton Jordon	21 rushes, 74 yards
South Carolina State	Receiving	Caleb Davis	3 receptions, 73 yards

=== South Alabama ===
	1	2	3	4	OT	Total
Jaguars	0	7	6	7	0	20
Panthers	7	7	3	3	7	27

Statistics	USA	GAST
First downs	24	17
Total yards	323	429
Rushing yards	178	220
Passing yards	145	209
Turnovers	5	3
Time of possession	31:05	28:55

Team	Category	Player	Statistics
South Alabama	Passing	C. J. Bennett	14/29, 145 yards, 2 TD, 4 INT
South Alabama	Rushing	Kendall Houston	17 rushes, 83 yards
South Alabama	Receiving	Corey Waldon	3 receptions, 35 yards, TD
Georgia State	Passing	Kelton Hill	12/15, 209 yards, 2 TD
Georgia State	Rushing	Donald Russell	20 rushes, 136 yards, TD
Georgia State	Receiving	Albert Wilson	5 receptions, 175 yards, 2 TD

=== At UTSA ===
	1	2	3	4	OT	Total
Panthers	0	14	0	0	0	14
Roadrunners	0	3	0	11	3	17

Statistics	GAST	UTSA
First downs	16	16
Total yards	255	297
Rushing yards	164	108
Passing yards	91	189
Turnovers	0	1
Time of possession	31:19	28:41

Team	Category	Player	Statistics
Georgia State	Passing	Kelton Hill	6/15, 91 yards, TD
Georgia State	Rushing	Donald Russell	21 rushes, 87 yards, TD
Georgia State	Receiving	Albert Wilson	1 reception, 54 yards, TD
UTSA	Passing	Eric Soza	17/34, 189 yards, INT
UTSA	Rushing	Chris Johnson	9 rushes, 33 yards, TD
UTSA	Receiving	Kam Jones	6 receptions, 52 yards

=== St. Francis (IL) ===
	1	2	3	4	OT	Total
Fighting Saints	0	10	0	17	3	30
Panthers	7	10	7	3	0	27

Statistics	SFIL	GAST
First downs	25	14
Total yards	475	355
Rushing yards	258	158
Passing yards	217	197
Turnovers	1	1
Time of possession	33:23	26:37

Team	Category	Player	Statistics
St. Francis	Passing	E. J. White	21/32, 217 yards, 2 TD, INT
St. Francis	Rushing	Anthony Hubert	19 rushes, 160 yards, TD
St. Francis	Receiving	Desmond Page	8 receptions, 112 yards, TD
Georgia State	Passing	Kelton Hill	14/24, 197 yards, 2 TD, INT
Georgia State	Rushing	Kelton Hill	12 rushes, 98 yards, TD
Georgia State	Receiving	Albert Wilson	7 receptions, 89 yards

=== At West Alabama ===
	1	2	3	4	Total
Panthers	7	7	2	7	23
Tigers	10	10	0	10	30

Statistics	GAST	UWA
First downs	21	24
Total yards	448	412
Rushing yards	220	246
Passing yards	228	166
Turnovers	5	3
Time of possession	26:14	33:46

Team	Category	Player	Statistics
Georgia State	Passing	Kelton Hill	19/36, 228 yards, TD, 2 INT
Georgia State	Rushing	Kelton Hill	19 rushes, 152 yards, 2 TD
Georgia State	Receiving	Albert Wilson	8 receptions, 120 yards, TD
West Alabama	Passing	Kyle Caldwell	15/20, 166 yards, TD, 2 INT
West Alabama	Rushing	Matthew Willis	35 rushes, 192 yards, 2 TD
West Alabama	Receiving	Gerald Worsham	8 receptions, 67 yards

=== Campbell ===
	1	2	3	4	Total
Fighting Camels	7	0	7	21	35
Panthers	7	7	14	14	42

Statistics	CAMP	GAST
First downs	20	27
Total yards	338	514
Rushing yards	88	301
Passing yards	250	213
Turnovers	2	2
Time of possession	25:56	34:04

Team	Category	Player	Statistics
Campbell	Passing	Braden Smith	21/32, 250 yards, TD, INT
Campbell	Rushing	Braden Smith	10 rushes, 44 yards, TD
Campbell	Receiving	Preston Dodson	5 receptions, 81 yards, TD
Georgia State	Passing	Kelton Hill	13/22, 213 yards, 4 TD, INT
Georgia State	Rushing	Donald Russell	19 rushes, 146 yards
Georgia State	Receiving	Danny Williams	4 receptions, 92 yards, TD
