= 2011 Nebraska Cornhuskers football team =

American college football season

2011 Nebraska Cornhuskers football

Capital One Bowl, L 13–30 vs. South Carolina
- Conference: Big Ten Conference
- Legends Division

Ranking
- Coaches: No. 24
- AP: No. 24
- Record: 9–4 (5–3 Big Ten)
- Head coach: Bo Pelini (4th season)
- Offensive coordinator: Tim Beck (1st season)
- Offensive scheme: Spread
- Defensive coordinator: Carl Pelini (4th season)
- Base defense: 4–2
- Home stadium: Memorial Stadium

2011 Big Ten Conference football standings
	Conf.			Overall
Team	W		L	W		L
Legends Division
No. 11 Michigan State x	7	–	1	11	–	3
No. 12 Michigan %	6	–	2	11	–	2
No. 24 Nebraska	5	–	3	9	–	4
Iowa	4	–	4	7	–	6
Northwestern	3	–	5	6	–	7
Minnesota	2	–	6	3	–	9
Leaders Division
No. 10 Wisconsin xy$	6	–	2	11	–	3
Penn State x	6	–	2	9	–	4
Purdue	4	–	4	7	–	6
Ohio State	3	–	5	6	–	7
Illinois	2	–	6	7	–	6
Indiana	0	–	8	1	–	11
Championship: Wisconsin 42, Michigan State 39
$ – BCS representative as conference champion; % – BCS at-large representative; x – Division champion/co-champions; y – Championship game participant; Rankings from AP Poll

The 2011 Nebraska Cornhuskers football team represented the University of Nebraska–Lincoln in the 2011 NCAA Division I FBS football season. The Cornhuskers were coached by Bo Pelini and played their home games at Memorial Stadium in Lincoln, Nebraska. This season was Nebraska's first in the Big Ten Conference in the Legends Division as they moved from the Big 12 Conference to the Big Ten following the conclusion of the 2010 season. They finished the season 9–4, 5–3 in Big Ten play to finish in third place in the Legends Division. They were invited to the Capital One Bowl where they were defeated by South Carolina 30–13.

== Before the season ==
The 2011 football season marks Nebraska's entrance into the Big Ten Conference.

=== Recruiting ===
==== Scholarship recruits ====
College recruiting
Name	Hometown	School	Height	Weight	40^{‡}	Commit date
Ameer Abdullah; RB	Homewood, Alabama	Homewood	5 ft 9 in (1.75 m)	177 lb (80 kg)	4.51	Jan 20, 2011
Ameer Abdullah; RB	Recruit ratings: Scout: Rivals: ESPN:					
Taariq Allen; WR	Weston, Massachusetts	Rivers	6 ft 3 in (1.91 m)	190 lb (86 kg)	4.54	Oct 26, 2010
Taariq Allen; WR	Recruit ratings: Scout: Rivals: ESPN:					
Mauro Bondi; K	Boca Raton, Florida	West	6 ft 0 in (1.83 m)	190 lb (86 kg)	N/A	Jan 30, 2011
Mauro Bondi; K	Recruit ratings: Scout: Rivals: ESPN:					
Joe Carter; DE	Aiken, South Carolina	Chaffey CC	6 ft 5 in (1.96 m)	250 lb (110 kg)	N/A	Jan 28, 2011
Joe Carter; DE	Recruit ratings: Scout: Rivals:					
Daniel Davie; S	Beatrice, Nebraska	Beatrice	6 ft 0 in (1.83 m)	181 lb (82 kg)	4.32	Jun 17, 2010
Daniel Davie; S	Recruit ratings: Scout: Rivals: ESPN:					
Aaron Green; RB	San Antonio, Texas	Madison	5 ft 11 in (1.80 m)	191 lb (87 kg)	4.44	Oct 27, 2010
Aaron Green; RB	Recruit ratings: Scout: Rivals: ESPN:					
Charles Jackson; CB	Klein, Texas	Collins	5 ft 11 in (1.80 m)	180 lb (82 kg)	4.4	Oct 30, 2010
Charles Jackson; CB	Recruit ratings: Scout: Rivals: ESPN:					
Ryan Klachko; OL	Springfield, Illinois	Sacred Heart-Griffin	6 ft 4 in (1.93 m)	280 lb (130 kg)	5.47	Apr 7, 2010
Ryan Klachko; OL	Recruit ratings: Scout: Rivals: ESPN:					
Tyler Moore; OT	Clearwater, Florida	Countryside	6 ft 6 in (1.98 m)	290 lb (130 kg)	5.07	Oct 10, 2009
Tyler Moore; OT	Recruit ratings: Scout: Rivals: ESPN:					
Todd Peat; DT	Tempe, Arizona	Corona del Sol	6 ft 3 in (1.91 m)	300 lb (140 kg)	5.04	Feb 2, 2011
Todd Peat; DT	Recruit ratings: Scout: Rivals: ESPN:					
Max Pirman; OLB	Orrville, Ohio	Orrville	6 ft 5 in (1.96 m)	218 lb (99 kg)	4.69	Nov 15, 2010
Max Pirman; OLB	Recruit ratings: Scout: Rivals: ESPN:					
Givens Price; OT	Houston, Texas	Taylor	6 ft 4 in (1.93 m)	278 lb (126 kg)	5.09	Dec 6, 2010
Givens Price; OT	Recruit ratings: Scout: Rivals: ESPN:					
Ryne Reeves; OG	Crete, Nebraska	Crete	6 ft 3 in (1.91 m)	286 lb (130 kg)	5	Jun 10, 2009
Ryne Reeves; OG	Recruit ratings: Scout: Rivals: ESPN:					
David Santos; LB	Klein, Texas	Collins	6 ft 0 in (1.83 m)	193 lb (88 kg)	4.55	Jul 31, 2010
David Santos; LB	Recruit ratings: Scout: Rivals: ESPN:					
Daimion Stafford; S	Norco, California	Chaffey CC	6 ft 1 in (1.85 m)	210 lb (95 kg)	4.46	May 19, 2010
Daimion Stafford; S	Recruit ratings: Scout: Rivals:					
Bubba Starling; QB	Gardner, Kansas	Gardner Edgerton	6 ft 5 in (1.96 m)	193 lb (88 kg)	4.5	Jun 19, 2010
Bubba Starling; QB	Recruit ratings: Scout: Rivals: ESPN:					
Zach Sterup; OT	Hastings, Nebraska	St. Cecilia	6 ft 8 in (2.03 m)	260 lb (120 kg)	5	Jun 22, 2010
Zach Sterup; OT	Recruit ratings: Scout: Rivals: ESPN:					
David Sutton; TE	Lincoln, Nebraska	Southeast	6 ft 4 in (1.93 m)	245 lb (111 kg)	4.60	Jan 30, 2011
David Sutton; TE	Recruit ratings: Scout: Rivals:					
Jamal Turner; QB	Arlington, Texas	Sam Houston	6 ft 0 in (1.83 m)	170 lb (77 kg)	4.5	Jan 28, 2010
Jamal Turner; QB	Recruit ratings: Scout: Rivals: ESPN:					
Kevin Williams; DT	Holland, Ohio	Springfield	6 ft 2 in (1.88 m)	275 lb (125 kg)	4.9	Apr 19, 2010
Kevin Williams; DT	Recruit ratings: Scout: Rivals: ESPN:					
Overall recruit ranking: Scout: 23 Rivals: 15 ESPN: 16
‡ Refers to 40-yard dash; Note: In many cases, Scout, Rivals, 247Sports, On3, and ESPN may conflict in their listings of height, weight and 40 time.; In these cases, the average was taken. ESPN grades are on a 100-point scale.; Sources: "Yahoo! Sports: Rivals.com 2011 Nebraska Commitments". Rivals.; "Scout.com 2011 Nebraska Commitments". Scout.; "ESPN 2011 Nebraska Commitments". ESPN.; "Scout.com Team Recruiting Rankings". Scout.; "2011 Team Ranking". Rivals.com.

- Note: Bubba Starling opted to play professional baseball with the Kansas City Royals rather than play baseball and football with Nebraska.

==== Walk-on recruits ====
College recruiting
Name	Hometown	School	Height	Weight	40^{‡}	Commit date
Tyson Broekmeier; QB	Aurora, Nebraska	Aurora	6 ft 1 in (1.85 m)	180 lb (82 kg)	4.7	Feb 1, 2011
Tyson Broekmeier; QB	Recruit ratings: No ratings found					
Sam Burtch; WR	Elmwood, Nebraska	Elmwood-Murdock	6 ft 3 in (1.91 m)	175 lb (79 kg)	4.6	
Sam Burtch; WR	Recruit ratings: No ratings found					
Jack Gangwish; LB	Wood River, Nebraska	Wood River	6 ft 2 in (1.88 m)	215 lb (98 kg)	4.9	Jan 24, 2011
Jack Gangwish; LB	Recruit ratings: No ratings found					
Aaron Hayes; OL	Elkhorn, Nebraska	Elkhorn	6 ft 3 in (1.91 m)	265 lb (120 kg)	5.2	Jan 22, 2011
Aaron Hayes; OL	Recruit ratings: No ratings found					
Adam Kucera; OL	Litchfield, Nebraska	Litchfield	6 ft 6 in (1.98 m)	285 lb (129 kg)	N/A	Jan 24, 2011
Adam Kucera; OL	Recruit ratings: No ratings found					
Murat Kuzu; RB	Plano, Texas	Plano	5 ft 11 in (1.80 m)	190 lb (86 kg)	4.54	Feb 4, 2011
Murat Kuzu; RB	Recruit ratings: No ratings found					
Anthony Ridder; LB	West Point, Nebraska	Central Catholic	6 ft 2 in (1.88 m)	195 lb (88 kg)	4.7	Jan 29, 2011
Anthony Ridder; LB	Recruit ratings: No ratings found					
Eddie Ridder; TE	Elkhorn, Nebraska	Mt. Michael	6 ft 6 in (1.98 m)	225 lb (102 kg)	N/A	
Eddie Ridder; TE	Recruit ratings: No ratings found					
Will Sailors; OL	Lincoln, Nebraska	Northeast	6 ft 3 in (1.91 m)	260 lb (120 kg)	5.2	Jan 24, 2011
Will Sailors; OL	Recruit ratings: No ratings found					
Derek Slaughter; LB	Pelham, Alabama	Pelham	5 ft 11 in (1.80 m)	200 lb (91 kg)	4.65	Jan 25, 2011
Derek Slaughter; LB	Recruit ratings: No ratings found					
Richard Wynne; RB	Omaha, Nebraska	Creighton Prep	5 ft 9 in (1.75 m)	175 lb (79 kg)	4.45	Jan 28, 2011
Richard Wynne; RB	Recruit ratings: No ratings found					
Overall recruit ranking:
‡ Refers to 40-yard dash; Note: In many cases, Scout, Rivals, 247Sports, On3, and ESPN may conflict in their listings of height, weight and 40 time.; In these cases, the average was taken. ESPN grades are on a 100-point scale.; Sources: "2011 Team Ranking". Rivals.com.

== Schedule ==
Date	Time	Opponent	Rank	Site	TV	Result	Attendance
September 3	2:30 p.m.	Chattanooga*	No. 10	Memorial Stadium; Lincoln, Nebraska	BTN	W 40–7	84,883
September 10	6:00 p.m.	Fresno State*	No. 10	Memorial Stadium; Lincoln, Nebraska	BTN	W 42–29	85,101
September 17	2:30 p.m.	Washington*	No. 11	Memorial Stadium; Lincoln, Nebraska	ABC/ESPN	W 51–38	85,110
September 24	6:30 p.m.	at Wyoming*	No. 9	War Memorial Stadium; Laramie, Wyoming	Versus	W 38–14	32,617
October 1	7:00 p.m.	at No. 7 Wisconsin	No. 8	Camp Randall Stadium; Madison, Wisconsin (College GameDay)	ABC	L 17–48	81,384
October 8	7:00 p.m.	Ohio State^{†}	No. 14	Memorial Stadium; Lincoln, Nebraska	ABC	W 34–27	85,426
October 22	2:30 p.m.	at Minnesota	No. 13	TCF Bank Stadium; Minneapolis	ABC/ESPN2	W 41–14	49,187
October 29	11:00 a.m.	No. 9 Michigan State	No. 13	Memorial Stadium; Lincoln, Nebraska	ESPN	W 24–3	85,641
November 5	2:30 p.m.	Northwestern	No. 9	Memorial Stadium; Lincoln, Nebraska	BTN	L 25–28	85,115
November 12	11:00 a.m.	at No. 12 Penn State	No. 19	Beaver Stadium; University Park, Pennsylvania	ESPN	W 17–14	107,903
November 19	11:00 a.m.	at No. 20 Michigan	No. 17	Michigan Stadium; Ann Arbor, Michigan	ESPN	L 17–45	113,718
November 25	11:00 a.m.	Iowa	No. 22	Memorial Stadium; Lincoln, Nebraska (Heroes Game)	ABC	W 20–7	85,595
January 2, 2012	12:00 p.m.	vs. No. 10 South Carolina*	No. 21	Citrus Bowl; Orlando, Florida (Capital One Bowl)	ESPN	L 13–30	61,351
*Non-conference game; ^{†}Homecoming; Rankings from AP Poll released prior to the game; All times are in Central time

== Roster and coaching staff ==
2011 Nebraska Cornhuskers football team roster
Players
Coaches
Offense

Pos.	#	Name	Class
IB	8	Ameer Abdullah	Fr
WR	7	Taariq Allen	Fr
OL	70	Nick Ash	So
TE	82	Robert Barry	So
WR	80	Kenny Bell	RFr
QB	9	Tyson Broekemeier	Fr
IB	22	Rex Burkhead (C)	Jr
WR	46	Sam Burtch	Fr
OL	58	Mike Caputo	Sr
QB	16	Brion Carnes	RFr
OL	51	Brandon Chapek	So
OL	77	Seung Hoon Choi	Jr
WR	1	Khiry Cooper	Jr
TE	81	Ben Cotton	Jr
OL	67	Scott Criss	So
WR	13	Daniel Davie	Fr
WR	87	Taylor Dixon	Jr
WR	18	Quincy Enunwa	So
WR	88	Tyler Evans	RFr
WR	11	Curenski Gilleylen	Sr
IB	2	Aaron Green	Fr
QB	17	Cody Green	Jr
OL	50	Jermarcus Hardrick	Sr
OL	54	Aaron Hayes	Fr
IB	5	Braylon Heard	Fr
WR	85	KC Hyland	Jr
IB	28	Austin Jones	Sr
OL	52	Dwight Jones	So
OL	78	Marcel Jones	Sr
QB	12	Ron Kellogg III	So
TE	89	J.T. Kerr	So
WR	84	Brandon Kinnie	Sr
OL	52	Ryan Klachko	Fr
OL	53	Adam Kucera	Fr
RB	24	Murat Kuzu	Fr
FB	48	Tyler Legate	Sr
OL	75	Luke Lingenfelter	Sr
TE	41	Jake Long	So
OL	61	Spencer Long	So
WR	6	Tim Marlowe	Jr
FB	19	Mike Marrow	So
FB	35	Jay Martin	Sr
QB	3	Taylor Martinez	So
OL	73	Tyler Moore	Fr
OL	57	Mike Moudy	RFr
OL	69	Brodrick Nickens	So
IB	29	Collins Okafor	Jr
WR	21	Steven Osborne	Jr
OL	56	Mark Pelini	RFr
OL	62	Cole Pensick	So
OL	66	Givens Price	Fr
OL	76	Brent Qvale	So
TE	25	Kyler Reed	Jr
OL	65	Ryne Reeves	Fr
TE	36	Eddie Ridder	Fr
OL	63	Andrew Rodriguez	So
OL	59	Will Sailors	Fr
OL	71	Jeremiah Sirles	So
WR	39	Jacob Smith	RFr
OL	57	Zach Sterup	Fr
TE	98	David Sutton	Fr
RB	40	Zach Taylor	RFr
OL	79	Brandon Thompson	Jr
OL	59	Brian Thorson	Jr
WR	10	Jamal Turner	Fr
IB	14	Lester Ward	Jr
IB	30	Richard Wynee Jr.	So
WR	26	Tyler Wullenwaber	RFr
FB	31	C.J. Zimmerer	So

Defense

Pos.	#	Name	Class
DE	70	Kenny Anderson	Jr
DE	9	Jason Ankrah	So
DE	47	Walker Ashburn	RFr
CB	2	Antonio Bell	Jr
DB	39	Justin Blatchford	Jr
CB	14	Anthony Blue	Sr
LB	50	Broderick Boehm	Fr
DE	7	Joseph Carter	Jr
S	8	Austin Cassidy	Sr
LB	51	Will Compton	Jr
DB	6	Corey Cooper	RFr
DT	96	Jake Cotton	RFr
DT	94	Jared Crick	Sr
LB	4	Lavonte David (C)	Sr
CB	31	Jase Dean	Jr
CB	15	Alfonzo Dennard	Sr
S	32	Jim Ebke	Sr
DB	17	Ciante Evans	So
DB	25	Joey Felici	RFr
LB	42	Sean Fisher	Jr
DB	30	Derek Foster	RFr
LB	95	Jack Gangwish	Fr
DE	80	Andy Gdowski	RFr
DB	11	Andrew Green	So
DL	99	Jay Guy	RFr
DB	35	Andrew Holt	RFr
DB	26	Harvey Jackson	RFr
DT	58	Justin Jackson	Jr
DB	29	Seth Jameson	So
CB	16	Stanley Jean-Baptiste	So
LB	44	Micah Kreikemeier	Jr
LB	49	Matt Manninger	Jr
S	21	Bronson Marsh	Fr
LB	46	Eric Martin	Jr
LB	36	Mathew May	Sr
DE	65	Colin McDermott	Jr
DE	89	Conor McDermott	Jr
CB	32	Marcus Mendoza	Sr
DE	34	Cameron Meredith	Jr
DB	18	Josh Mitchell	RFr
DT	68	Josh Molek	Jr
DE	52	J.C. Moore	RFr
DT	90	Terrence Moore	Sr
DE	48	Tobi Okuyemi	RFr
S	12	Courtney Osborne	Jr
DT	57	Todd Peat Jr.	Fr
LB	40	Max Pirman	Fr
DL	53	Thaddeus Randle	So
DB	19	Wil Richards	So
LB	26	Anthony Ridder	Fr
LB	54	Trevor Roach	RFr
DT	97	Chase Rome	RFr
LB	41	David Santos	Fr
LB	22	Derek Slaughter	Fr
S	13	P.J. Smith	Jr
DB	3	Daimion Stafford	Jr
LB	59	Colby Starkebaum	So
DT	55	Baker Steinkuhler	Jr
LB	38	Graham Stoddard	Jr
DE	37	Kevin Thomsen	Sr
DB	23	Lance Thorell	Sr
DL	61	Jeff Uher	RFr
DE	91	Donovan Vestal	RFr
DB	38	Yusef Wade	RFr
CB	10	Dijon Washington	So
LB	45	Alonzo Whaley	Jr
DB	24	Austin Williams	RFr
DE	98	Josh Williams	Jr
DT	92	Kevin Williams	Fr

Special teams

Pos.	#	Name	Class
PK	37	Mauro Bondi	Fr
P/PK	27	Jon Damkroger	Sr
P/PK	96	Brett Maher (C)	Jr
LS	92	P.J. Mangieri	Jr
LS	97	Joseph Rotherham	Fr

Head coach

- Bo Pelini
  4th season
  5th year at Nebraska
  Alma mater: Ohio State

Coordinators/assistant coaches

- Tim Beck
  1st season as OC/QB coach
  4th year at Nebraska
  Alma mater: UCF
- Carl Pelini
  4th season as DC/DL coach
  4th year at Nebraska
  Alma mater: Youngstown State
- Ron Brown
  1st season as RB coach
  21st year at Nebraska
  Alma mater: Brown
- Barney Cotton
  4th season as AHC/OL coach
  5th year at Nebraska
  Alma mater: Nebraska
- Ross Els
  1st season as LB coach
  1st year at Nebraska
  Alma mater: Nebraska-Omaha
- Rich Fisher
  1st season as WR coach
  1st year at Nebraska
  Alma mater: Colorado
- John Garrison
  1st season as OL/TE coach
  1st year at Nebraska
  Alma mater: Nebraska
- John Papuchis
  4th season as DE/ST coach
  4th year at Nebraska
  Alma mater: Virginia Tech
- Corey Raymond
  1st season as Sec coach
  1st year at Nebraska
  Alma mater: LSU
- T. J. Hollowell
  1st season as GA coach
  1st year at Nebraska
  Alma mater: Nebraska
- Vince Marrow
  1st season as GA coach
  1st year at Nebraska
  Alma mater: Youngstown State
- James Dobson
  4th season as S&C coach
  4th year at Nebraska
  Alma mater: Wisconsin

Legend

- (C) Team captain
- (S) Suspended
- (I) Ineligible
- Injured
- Redshirt

Roster
Last update: December 1, 2011

Defense

NICKEL
Ciante Evans
Lance Thorell
⋅

FS
Damian Stafford
Courtney Osborne
⋅

MIKE	WILL
Will Compton	Lavonte David
Graham Stoddard	Sean Fisher; Alonzo Whaley
⋅	⋅

SS
Austin Cassidy
P.J. Smith
⋅

CB
Alfonzo Dennard
Josh Mitchell
⋅

DE	DT	DT	DE
Cameron Meredith	Baker Steinkuler	Jared Crick (injured); Terrence Moore	Jason Ankrah
Joseph Carter	Chase Rome	Josh Williams	Eric Martin
⋅	⋅	⋅	⋅

CB
Andrew Green
Stanley Jean-Baptiste
⋅

Offense

WR
Kenny Bell
Tim Marlowe
⋅

WR
Brandon Kinnie
Jamal Turner
⋅

LT	LG	C	RG	RT
Jermarcus Hardrick	Seung Hoon-Choi; Andrew Rodriguez	Mike Caputo	Spencer Long	Marcel Jones
Jeremiah Sirles	Brandon Thompson	Cole Pensick	Brent Qvale	Tyler Moore
⋅	⋅	⋅	⋅	⋅

TE
Kyler Reed
Ben Cotton
Jake Long
⋅

WR
Quincy Enunwa
Khiry Cooper
⋅

QB
Taylor Martinez
Brion Carnes
⋅

Key reserves
FB Tyler Legate
FB C.J Zimmerer

Special teams
PK Brett Maher
P Brett Maher
KR Ameer Abdullah
PR Ameer Abdullah
LS \

RB
Rex Burkhead
Ameer Abdullah
Aaron Green
Braylon Heard

== Game summaries ==
=== Chattanooga ===
Chattanooga at Nebraska

Team	1	2	3	4	Total
Chattanooga	0	0	7	0	7
• #10 Nebraska	10	13	17	0	40

- Date: September 3, 2011
- Location: Memorial Stadium, Lincoln, Nebraska
- Game start: 2:38 p.m. CST
- Elapsed time: 3:06
- Game attendance: 84,883
- Game weather: Cloudy, 78°F, Wind NW@17-26mph
- Referee: Dan Capron
- TV announcers (BTN): Kevin Kugler (Play-by-play), Kelly Stouffer (Color) & Ahman Green (Sideline)

This game was Nebraska's first football game as a representative of the Big Ten, and the first meeting between the Cornhuskers and the FCS Chattanooga Mocs, who are members of the Southern Conference. The Mocs finished 2010 with a 6–5 record (5–3 in conference for a three-way tie for 3rd place), including a 24–62 defeat at the hands of #3 Auburn on November 6, 2010.

=== Fresno State ===
Fresno State at Nebraska

Team	1	2	3	4	Total
Fresno State	14	3	3	9	29
• #10 Nebraska	7	7	7	21	42

- Date: September 10, 2011
- Location: Memorial Stadium, Lincoln, Nebraska
- Game start: 6:08 p.m. CST
- Elapsed time: 3:36
- Game attendance: 85,101
- Game weather: Clear, 80°F, Wind E@5mph
- Referee: Bill Athan
- TV announcers (BTN): Eric Collins (Play-by-play), Chris Martin (Color) & Dionne Miller (Sideline)

Nebraska opened a series with another new foe never before met on the field, for a second consecutive week, when the Fresno State Bulldogs arrived in Lincoln. Fresno State finished the 2010 season under 14th–year Head Coach Pat Hill with an 8–5 record (5–3 in the Western Athletic Conference for 4th place), including a 17–40 postseason loss to the 2010 Northern Illinois Huskies football team Huskies in the 2010 Humanitarian Bowl.

=== Washington ===
Washington at Nebraska

Team	1	2	3	4	Total
Washington	7	10	0	21	38
• #11 Nebraska	10	10	17	14	51

- Date: September 17, 2011
- Location: Memorial Stadium, Lincoln, Nebraska
- Game start: 2:42 p.m. CST
- Elapsed time: 3:32
- Game attendance: 85,110
- Game weather: Overcast, 58°F, Wind SE@14mph
- Referee: Dave Witvoet
- TV announcers (ABC): Sean McDonough (Play-by-play), Matt Millen (Color) & Heather Cox (Sideline)

Scoring summary
1	14:26	NEB	Tyler Legate 3-yard pass from Taylor Martinez (Brett Maher kick)	NEB 7–0
1	11:54	WASH	Jermaine Kearse 38-yard pass from Keith Price (Erik Folk kick)	Tied 7–7
1	7:39	NEB	Brett Maher 44-yard field goal	NEB 10–7
2	13:40	WASH	Jermaine Kearse 6-yard pass from Keith Price (Erik Folk kick)	WASH 14–10
2	12:17	NEB	Aaron Green 25-yard pass from Taylor Martinez (Brett Maher kick)	NEB 17–14
2	9:24	WASH	Erik Folk 40-yard field goal	Tied 17–17
2	0:00	NEB	Brett Maher 35-yard field goal	NEB 20–17
3	10:18	NEB	Rex Burkhead 1-yard run (Brett Maher kick)	NEB 27–17
3	10:09	NEB	Rex Burkhead 1-yard run (Brett Maher kick)	NEB 34–17
3	7:20	NEB	Brett Maher 29-yard field goal	NEB 37–17
4	12:18	NEB	Aaron Green 6-yard run (Brett Maher kick)	NEB 44–17
4	10:15	WASH	Chris Polk 2-yard run (Erik Folk kick)	NEB 44–24
4	7:21	WASH	James Johnson 10-yard pass from Keith Price (Erik Folk kick)	NEB 44–31
4	4:42	NEB	Taylor Martinez 6-yard run (Brett Maher kick)	NEB 51–31
4	4:27	WASH	James Johnson 52-yard pass from Keith Price (Erik Folk kick)	NEB 51–38

When Nebraska met Washington in their September 18, 2010 non-conference match, the Cornhuskers won 56–21 in Seattle, tying the most points ever scored by a non–conference opponent in Husky Stadium, and igniting Heisman Trophy talk around Nebraska's redshirt freshman QB Taylor Martinez. However, a mid-season ankle injury to Martinez coincided with a downturn in Nebraska's fortunes late in the season, as the Cornhuskers finished the season by losing two of the last three games, including letting a 17–3 advantage over Oklahoma in the 2010 Big 12 Championship Game fade into a 20–23 defeat. After the loss, Nebraska was selected for a rematch with Washington in the 2010 Holiday Bowl, where an uninspired Cornhusker squad bowed to the effort and determination of the underdog Huskies and their senior QB, Jake Locker. The 7–19 postseason loss left Nebraska with three losses in the final four games of the season. This closing chapter matched a mark not seen since 2007, the final season of former Cornhusker Head Coach Bill Callahan. The 2011 meeting of these teams, this time in Lincoln, was the third time Washington and Nebraska played in just under a year. The all-time series now has a one-game edge for Nebraska with a 5–4–1 record between the two teams.

=== Wyoming ===
Nebraska at Wyoming

Team	1	2	3	4	Total
• #9 Nebraska	7	7	10	14	38
Wyoming	0	7	0	7	14

- Date: September 24, 2011
- Location: War Memorial Stadium, Laramie, Wyoming
- Game start: 6:38 p.m. CST
- Elapsed time: 3:07
- Game attendance: 32,617
- Game weather: Calm, 74°F, Wind N@12mph
- Referee: Dennis Lipski
- TV announcers (Versus): Paul Burmeister (Play-by-play), Shaun King (Color) & Anthony Herron (Sideline)

Wyoming Head Coach Dave Christensen led the 2009 Cowboys to a 7–6 (4–4 Mountain West Conference) finish in his first season, including a 35–28 defeat of Fresno State in the 2009 New Mexico Bowl. However, the Cowboys slid to a disappointing 2010 final record of 3–9 (1–7), which included a 28–20 win over Southern Utah of the FCS. Nebraska is undefeated in all five previous meetings of these teams, with a combined scoring total of 203–69. The series dates back to 1934, but this will be the first time the squads meet at War Memorial Stadium in Laramie.

=== Wisconsin ===
Nebraska at Wisconsin

Team	1	2	3	4	Total
#8 Nebraska	7	7	0	3	17
• #7 Wisconsin	7	20	14	7	48

- Date: October 1, 2011
- Location: Camp Randall Stadium, Madison, Wisconsin
- Game start: 7:12 p.m. CST
- Elapsed time: 3:22
- Game attendance: 81,384
- Game weather: Clear, 51°F, Wind N@5mph
- Referee: Bill LeMonnier
- TV announcers (ABC): Brent Musburger (Play-by-play), Kirk Herbstreit (Color) & Erin Andrews (Sideline)

Nebraska opened Big Ten conference play for the first time, with a road game at Wisconsin. The Cornhuskers met a team that finished 2010 in a three-way tie for the Big Ten title and an 11–2 (7–1) record, which included a 19–21 loss to #3 TCU in the 2011 Rose Bowl. Following Wisconsin's 48—17 win, the series between the two schools is tied at 3–3.

=== Ohio State ===
Ohio State at Nebraska

Team	1	2	3	4	Total
Ohio State	10	10	7	0	27
• #14 Nebraska	3	3	14	14	34

- Date: October 8, 2011
- Location: Memorial Stadium, Lincoln, Nebraska
- Game start: 7:12 p.m. CST
- Elapsed time: 3:14
- Game attendance: 85,426
- Game weather: Scattered Showers, 70°F, Wind SSE@5-10mph
- Referee: John O'Neill
- TV announcers (ABC): Sean McDonough (Play-by-play), Matt Millen (Color) & Heather Cox (Sideline)

This game was the third all-time meeting between Nebraska and Ohio State, and the first since 1956. The game also marked the Buckeyes' first appearance in Lincoln. In two previous three contests, Ohio State had outscored Nebraska a combined 62–27. Nebraska trailed at halftime 20–6, and would ultimately fall behind by a score of 27–6 midway through the third quarter. Nebraska's ultimate comeback began with a LaVonte David strip and fumble recovery of Ohio State quarterback Braxton Miller. On the next play Taylor Martinez ran past the Ohio State defense for an 18-yard touchdown, the first of four unanswered touchdowns. On the subsequent Ohio State series, Miller twisted his ankle causing him to leave the game. He did not return. He was replaced by Joe Bauserman who went 1–10 passing including a costly interception. The Nebraska offense out-gained Ohio State in the second half by a total of 250 to 45 yards. With the win, Nebraska secured its first ever victory over Ohio State and as a member of the Big Ten Conference. The win also marked the largest come from behind win in school history after trailing 27–6 midway through the third quarter.

=== Minnesota ===
Nebraska at Minnesota

Team	1	2	3	4	Total
• #13 Nebraska	10	24	7	0	41
Minnesota	0	0	7	7	14

- Date: October 22, 2011
- Location: TCF Bank Stadium, Minneapolis
- Game start: 2:36 p.m. CST
- Elapsed time: 2:59
- Game attendance: 49,187
- Game weather: Clear, 61°F, Wind NNW@3mph
- Referee: Todd Geerlings
- TV announcers (ABC/ESPN2): Carter Blackburn (Play-by-play) & Brock Huard (Color)

Scoring summary
1	8:03	NEB	Brett Maher 22-yard field goal	NEB 3–0
1	3:27	NEB	Tyler Legate 10-yard pass from Taylor Martinez (Brett Maher kick)	NEB 10–0
2	14:38	NEB	Kenny Bell 82-yard run (Brett Maher kick)	NEB 17–0
2	9:49	NEB	Brett Maher 25-yard field goal	NEB 20–0
2	9:34	NEB	Austin Cassidy 11-yard fumble return (Brett Maher kick)	NEB 27–0
2	0:33	NEB	Rex Burkhead 4-yard run (Brett Maher kick)	NEB 34–0
3	6:45	MINN	MarQueis Gray 5-yard run (Chris Hawthorne kick)	NEB 34–7
3	0:39	NEB	Aaron Green 4-yard run (Mauro Bondi kick)	NEB 41–7
4	1:41	MINN	Duane Bennett 6-yard run (Chris Hawthorne kick)	NEB 41–14

Nebraska renewed an old rivalry against the Golden Gophers, as the Cornhuskers played at TCF Bank Stadium for the first time for Minnesota's 2011 homecoming game. The last meeting was a 1990 non-conference game. First-year Minnesota Head Coach Jerry Kill has taken over the squad following a 3–9 (2–6) finish in 2010. With Nebraska's 41–14 win in this contest Minnesota still holds a 29–21–2 edge in the all-time series.

=== Michigan State ===
Michigan State at Nebraska

Team	1	2	3	4	Total
#9 Michigan State	0	3	0	0	3
• #13 Nebraska	10	0	14	0	24

- Date: October 29, 2011
- Location: Memorial Stadium, Lincoln, Nebraska
- Game start: 11:02 a.m. CST
- Elapsed time: 3:14
- Game attendance: 85,641
- Game weather: Sunny, 45°F, Wind S@5-10mph
- Referee: Dan Capron
- TV announcers (ESPN): Dave Pasch (Play-by-play), Chris Spielman (Color), Urban Meyer (Color) & Quint Kessenich (Sideline)

Nebraska met Michigan State for the first time since the Spartans were defeated 3–17 by Nebraska in the 2003 Alamo Bowl. Of special significance, that was the first Nebraska football victory under Head Coach Bo Pelini, as he served a one-game stint as interim Head Coach following the late-season dismissal of Frank Solich in 2003. The victory added to Nebraska's undefeated record against the Spartans, moving the streak to 6–0.

=== Northwestern ===
Northwestern at Nebraska

Team	1	2	3	4	Total
• Northwestern	7	0	7	14	28
#9 Nebraska	0	3	7	15	25

- Date: November 5, 2011
- Location: Memorial Stadium, Lincoln, Nebraska
- Game start: 2:42 p.m. CST
- Elapsed time: 3:15
- Game attendance: 85,115
- Game weather: Sunny, 59°F, Wind S@25mph
- Referee: Dave Witvoet
- TV announcers (BTN): Eric Collins, Chris Martin (Color) & Dionne Miller (Sideline)

Following an important Legends division win against Michigan State the previous week, Nebraska dropped a stunning 28–25 decision to Pat Fitzgerald's Northwestern Wildcats. The 2011 match up between the Huskers and Wildcats marked the first contest between the two schools since the Nebraska's 66–17 victory in the 2000 Alamo Bowl. Despite the loss, Nebraska still holds a 3–2 lead in the all-time series.

=== Penn State ===
Nebraska at Penn State

Team	1	2	3	4	Total
• #19 Nebraska	0	10	7	0	17
#12 Penn State	0	0	7	7	14

- Date: November 12, 2011
- Location: Beaver Stadium, University Park, Pennsylvania
- Game start: 11:03 a.m. CST
- Elapsed time: 3:27
- Game attendance: 107,903
- Game weather: Mostly Sunny, 40–50°F, Wind SW@15mph
- Referee: Scott McElwee
- TV announcers (ESPN): Dave Pasch (Play-by-play), Chris Spielman (Color), Tom Rinaldi (Sideline) & Lisa Salters (Sideline)

Scoring summary
2	10:55	NEB	Brett Maher 41-yard field goal	NEB 3–0
2	0:44	NEB	Ameer Abdullah 2-yard run (Brett Maher kick)	NEB 10–0
3	8:51	NEB	Rex Burkhead 14-yard run (Brett Maher kick)	NEB 17–0
3	5:07	PSU	Stephfon Green 5-yard run (Anthony Fera kick)	NEB 17–7
4	5:42	PSU	Stephfon Green 6-yard run (Anthony Fera kick)	NEB 17–14

The game against Penn State was surrounded by the circumstances presented in the Penn State sex abuse scandal. Allegations against the former Penn State assistant coach emerged nationally in the week leading up the game. In the wake of the scandal, Penn State head coach Joe Paterno was fired the Wednesday of game week. Penn State's contest against Nebraska marked the first Nittany Lion's game not coached by Paterno in 46 years. Before the kickoff, players from both sides met at mid–field for a prayer led by Nebraska assistant football coach Ron Brown. In the game, Nebraska led 10–0 at halftime and then extended their lead to 17–0 after taking advantage of a Matt McGloin fumble in the third quarter. Penn State rallied and had a chance to win after scoring two touchdowns and narrowing the deficit to 17–14. However, Nebraska's defense came up with two key fourth down stops to secure the victory. The game was marked with much emotion with a blue-out at Beaver Stadium in support of the alleged victims of Sandusky's crimes.

=== Michigan ===
Nebraska at Michigan

Team	1	2	3	4	Total
#17 Nebraska	7	3	7	0	17
• #20 Michigan	10	7	14	14	45

- Date: November 19, 2011
- Location: Michigan Stadium, Ann Arbor, Michigan
- Game start: 11:00 a.m. CST
- Elapsed time: 3:30
- Game attendance: 113,718
- Game weather: Partly cloudy, Upper 40s°F, Wind: S@15-20mph
- Referee: Dennis Lipski
- TV announcers (ESPN): Dave Pasch (Play-by-play), Chris Spielman (Color), Urban Meyer (Color) & Quint Kessenich (Sideline)

=== Iowa ===
Iowa at Nebraska

Team	1	2	3	4	Total
Iowa	0	0	0	7	7
• #22 Nebraska	0	10	3	7	20

- Date: November 25, 2011
- Location: Memorial Stadium, Lincoln, Nebraska
- Game start: 11:07 a.m. CST
- Elapsed time: 3:06
- Game attendance: 85,595
- Game weather: Overcast, 54°F, Wind: S@13mph
- Referee: Todd Geerlings
- TV announcers (ABC): Bob Wischusen (Play-by-play), Bob Davie (Color) & Jeannine Edwards (Sideline)

Scoring summary
2	11:22	NEB	Brett Maher 40-yard field goal	NEB 3–0
2	0:32	NEB	Kyler Reed 6-yard pass from Taylor Martinez (Brett Maher kick)	NEB 10–0
3	4:42	NEB	Brett Maher 21-yard field goal	NEB 13–0
4	11:25	NEB	Rex Burkhead 2-yard run (Brett Maher kick)	NEB 20–0
4	3:26	IOWA	Marcus Coker 2-yard run (Mike Meyer kick)	NEB 20–7

=== South Carolina–Capital One Bowl ===
Nebraska vs. South Carolina

Team	1	2	3	4	Total
#21 Nebraska	13	0	0	0	13
• #10 South Carolina	9	7	0	14	30

- Date: January 2, 2012
- Location: Citrus Bowl, Orlando, Florida
- Game start: 12:03 p.m. CST
- Elapsed time: 3:03
- Game attendance: 61,351
- Game weather: Sunny, 64°F, Wind: NW@8mph
- Referee: Jerry McGinn
- TV announcers (ESPN): Joe Tessitore (Play-by-play), Rod Gilmore (Color) & Quint Kessenich (Sideline)

== Rankings ==
Ranking movements Legend: ██ Increase in ranking ██ Decrease in ranking
	Week															
Poll	Pre	1	2	3	4	5	6	7	8	9	10	11	12	13	14	Final
AP	10	10	11	9	8	14	14	13	13	9	19	17	22	20	21	24
Coaches	11	10	10	9	8	15	14	11	13	9	17	16	22	19	20	24
Harris	Not released						13	11	13	9	17	16	21	19	20	Not released
BCS	Not released							13	14	10	19	16	21	19	20	Not released

== After the season ==
=== Awards ===
==== Big Ten all-conference first team ====
As selected by the media and coaches:

- RB – Rex Burkhead
- LB – Lavonte David
- CB – Alfonzo Dennard
- PK – Brett Maher
- P – Brett Maher

==== Big Ten position awards ====
- Tatum-Woodson Defensive Back of the Year: Alfonzo Dennard CB
- Butkus-Fitzgerald Linebacker of the Year: Lavonte David LB
- Bakken-Andersen Kicker of the Year: Brett Maher K/P
- Eddleman-Fields Punter of the Year: Brett Maher K/P
- Big Ten Sportsmanship Award: Jared Crick DT
- Big Ten Freshman of the Year: Ameer Abdullah RB/KR/PR
