= List of Nebraska Cornhuskers head football coaches =

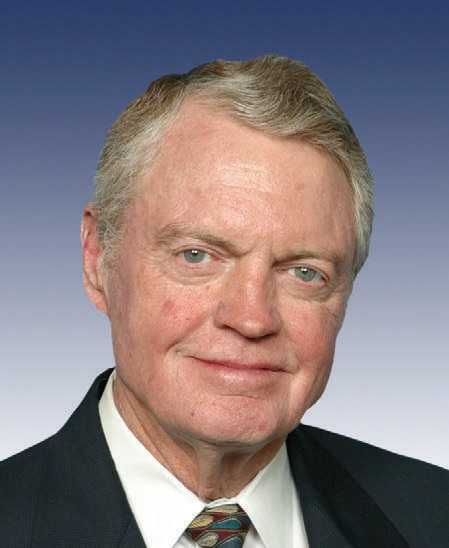
Tom Osborne coached Nebraska from 1973 to 1997 and is the program's all-time leader in most major categories

This list of Nebraska Cornhuskers head football coaches shows the coaches who have led the University of Nebraska–Lincoln's football program in a permanent or interim capacity. Nebraska has had thirty-one head coaches in its history, with five others coaching at least one game on a non-permanent basis. Eight have been inducted into the College Football Hall of Fame: Edward N. Robinson, Fielding H. Yost, Dana X. Bible, Biff Jones, Pete Elliott, (Note: Pete Elliott was inducted into the College Football Hall of Fame for his playing career as a quarterback at Michigan.) Bob Devaney, Tom Osborne, and Frank Solich. Osborne is the program's leader in most categories and holds the fifth-highest career win percentage in major college football history.

== History ==
NU's earliest coaching history is unclear, as several men were appointed to assist or oversee the young program in an unofficial capacity. The school recognizes Frank Crawford, hired in 1893, as its first official head coach. Early in the twentieth century, Nebraska became a regional power under Walter C. Booth – during a twenty-four-game win streak from 1901 to 1904, it was written that Booth could "weep with Alexander the Great because there are no more teams to conquer," given Nebraska's difficulty finding competitive and willing opposition in the Midwest. Twenty-four-year-old Ewald O. "Jumbo" Stiehm was hired in 1911 as the school's first full-time coach. Stiehm lost just two games in five seasons and his 8–0 1915 team was retroactively awarded a national championship.

Dana X. Bible and Biff Jones guided Nebraska to eight conference championships through the 1920s and 1930s, and Jones took the program to its first bowl game before being recalled to serve in World War II. Seven head coaches had little success in the postwar years until Bob Devaney was hired in 1962. Devaney turned Nebraska into a national power by the end of the decade, winning national championships in 1970 and 1971. Offensive coordinator Tom Osborne succeeded Devaney in 1973, beginning a twenty-five-year tenure that established him as one of college football's greatest coaches. Despite remarkable consistency – Osborne's teams never won fewer than nine games and were nationally ranked for 304 of his 307 games – he did not break through and win a major-poll national championship until 1994. Osborne retired in 1997 after two more titles and turned the program over to longtime assistant Frank Solich.

Solich took Nebraska to the 2002 BCS National Championship Game, but dropped to 7–7 the next year and was fired in 2003. After a lengthy coaching search, Nebraska settled on Bill Callahan, who overhauled the program in four turbulent years before being fired in 2007 and replaced by Bo Pelini. Pelini won at least nine games in each of his seven seasons, but frequent clashes with school administration (and some with program supporters) led to his firing. Nebraska suffered its worst eight-year stretch in over sixty years under Mike Riley and Scott Frost before hiring Matt Rhule in 2023.

== List of coaches ==
College Football Hall of Fame inductee

No.	Coach (Note: This list only includes those who coached at least one game. Several others served in an interim capacity.)	Tenure	Overall	Conference (Note: Nebraska competed as an independent in 1890 and 1891, from 1896 to 1908, and in 1919 and 1920.)	Accomplishments
	Langdon Frothingham	1890	2–0 (1.000)		
	Theron Lyman	1891	0–1 (.000)		
	J. S. Williams	1892	1–0 (1.000)	1–0 (1.000)	
1	Frank Crawford	1893–1894	9–4–1 (.679)	3–3 (.500)	1x WIUFA champion
2	Charles Thomas	1895	6–3 (.667)	2–1 (.667)	1x WIUFA champion
3	Eddie N. Robinson	1896–1897	11–4–1 (.719)	4–1–1 (.750)	1x WIUFA champion
4	Fielding H. Yost	1898	8–3–0 (.727)		
5	Alonzo Edwin Branch	1899	1–7–1 (.167)		
6	Walter C. Booth	1900–1905	46–8–1 (.845)		
7	Amos Foster	1906	6–4 (.600)		
8	William C. Cole	1907–1910	25–8–3 (.736)	5–2–1 (.688)	2x MVIAA champion
9	Ewald O. Stiehm	1911–1915	35–2–3 (.913)	14–0–1 (.967)	1x National champion (unclaimed); 5x MVIAA champion
10	E. J. Stewart	1916–1917	11–4 (.733)	5–1 (.833)	2x MVIAA champion
11	William G. Kline	1918	2–3–1 (.417)		
12	Henry Schulte	1919–1920	8–6–3 (.559)		
13	Fred Dawson	1921–1924	23–7–2 (.750)	14–1–2 (.882)	3x MVIAA champion
14	Ernest Bearg	1925–1928	23–7–3 (.742)	16–4–1 (.786)	1x MVIAA champion
15	Dana X. Bible	1929–1936	50–15–7 (.743)	33–3–4 (.875)	6x MVIAA champion
16	Biff Jones	1937–1941	28–14–4 (.652)	17–6–2 (.720)	2x MVIAA champion
17	Glenn Presnell	1942	3–7 (.300)	3–2 (.600)	
18	Adolph Lewandowski	1943–1944	4–12 (.250)	4–6 (.400)	
19	George Clark	1945, 1948	6–13 (.316)	4–7 (.364)	
20	Bernie Masterson	1946–1947	5–13 (.278)	5–5 (.500)	
21	Bill Glassford	1949–1955	31–35–3 (.471)	23–18–1 (.560)	
22	Pete Elliott	1956	4–6 (.400)	3–3 (.500)	
23	Bill Jennings	1957–1961	15–34–1 (.310)	6–19 (.240)	
24	Bob Devaney	1962–1972	101–20–2 (.829)	62–14–1 (.812)	2x National champion 8x Big Eight champion 1x Walter Camp Coach of the Year; 1x Eddie Robinson Coach of the Year
25	Tom Osborne	1973–1997	255–49–3 (.836)	153–22–1 (.872)	3x National champion 6x National champion (unclaimed); 12x Big Eight champion 1x Big 12 champion 1x Bobby Dodd Coach of the Year; 1x AFCA Coach of the Year
26	Frank Solich	1998–2003	58–19 (.753)	33–15 (.688)	1x Big 12 champion
27	Bill Callahan	2004–2007	27–22 (.551)	15–17 (.469)	
28	Bo Pelini (Note: Pelini served as interim head coach for the 2003 Alamo Bowl after the firing of Frank Solich.)	2003, 2008–2014	67–27 (.713)	38–17 (.691)	
	Barney Cotton (Note: Cotton served as interim head coach for the 2014 Holiday Bowl after the firing of Bo Pelini.)	2014	0–1 (.000)		
29	Mike Riley	2015–2017	19–19 (.500)	12–14 (.462)	
30	Scott Frost	2018–2022	16–31 (.340)	10–26 (.286)	
	Mickey Joseph (Note: Joseph served as interim head coach for the remainder of the 2022 season after the firing of Scott Frost.)	2022	3–6 (.333)	3–5 (.375)	
31	Matt Rhule	2023–present	26–23 (.531)	14–21 (.400)	
