= 2011 South Carolina Gamecocks football team =

American college football season

2011 South Carolina Gamecocks football

Palmetto Bowl champion

Capital One Bowl, W 30–13 vs. Nebraska
- Conference: Southeastern Conference
- East Division

Ranking
- Coaches: No. 8
- AP: No. 9
- Record: 11–2 (6–2 SEC)
- Head coach: Steve Spurrier (7th season)
- Offensive scheme: Fun and gun
- Defensive coordinator: Ellis Johnson (4th season)
- Base defense: 4–2–5
- Home stadium: Williams-Brice Stadium

2011 Southeastern Conference football standings
	Conf.			Overall
Team	W		L	W		L
Eastern Division
No. 19 Georgia x	7	–	1	10	–	4
No. 9 South Carolina	6	–	2	11	–	2
Florida	3	–	5	7	–	6
Vanderbilt	2	–	6	6	–	7
Kentucky	2	–	6	5	–	7
Tennessee	1	–	7	5	–	7
Western Division
No. 2 LSU x$	8	–	0	13	–	1
No. 1 Alabama %#	7	–	1	12	–	1
No. 5 Arkansas	6	–	2	11	–	2
Auburn	4	–	4	8	–	5
Mississippi State	2	–	6	7	–	6
Ole Miss*	0	–	8	2	–	10
Championship: LSU 42, Georgia 10
# – BCS National Champion; $ – BCS representative as conference champion; % – BCS at-large representative; x – Division champion/co-champions; * Ole Miss vacated all wins due to NCAA violations.; Rankings from AP Poll

The 2011 South Carolina Gamecocks football team represented the University of South Carolina in the 2011 NCAA Division I FBS football season. The Gamecocks were led by seventh-year head coach Steve Spurrier and played their home games at Williams–Brice Stadium. They were a member of the East Division of the Southeastern Conference and finished 11–2 for the season and 6–2 in SEC play.

The defending SEC East champions, South Carolina started the season 4–0 and ranked No. 10 in the country. However, in the fifth game of the season, they lost at home to unranked defending national champion Auburn, resulting in long-time starting quarterback Stephen Garcia being replaced by Connor Shaw. Shaw would subsequently start almost every game until the end of the 2013 season, becoming the winningest quarterback in school history along the way, and never losing at home. South Carolina would only lose one more game the rest of the season, a blowout on the road at No. 8 Arkansas. While the Gamecocks finished undefeated against the East Division, the losses to Auburn and Arkansas left them second in the division standings behind Georgia. In the Capital One Bowl, they defeated No. 21 Nebraska 30–13, the program's first bowl victory since 2006. The eleven wins were a school record; it was only the second time in the school's 119-year football history that it won as many as ten games. They also finished eighth in the final Coaches' Poll and ninth in the final AP Poll—their first-ever top-10 finishes in any major poll.

The 2011 Gamecocks were arguably the most talented team in school history. They are the only team in South Carolina's history with two future retired jerseys (Alshon Jeffery and Jadeveon Clowney). Melvin Ingram was a consensus All-American, only the third in program history. Marcus Lattimore was a frontrunner for the Heisman Trophy until a season-ending injury. Clowney, the highest-rated high school football recruit of all time, was named the SEC Freshman of the Year. The team had three future first-round NFL draft picks and sixteen total future NFL draft picks, the most in program history.

== Preseason ==
On April 10, 2011, the Garnet squad defeated the Black squad, 21–17, in the annual Garnet & Black Spring Game, in front of a crowd of 30,100.

== Schedule ==
Date	Time	Opponent	Rank	Site	TV	Result	Attendance
September 3	7:00 pm	vs. East Carolina*	No. 12	Bank of America Stadium; Charlotte, NC	FSN	W 56–37	58,272
September 10	4:30 pm	at Georgia	No. 12	Sanford Stadium; Athens, GA (rivalry)	ESPN	W 45–42	92,746
September 17	6:00 pm	Navy*	No. 10	Williams-Brice Stadium; Columbia, SC	ESPN2	W 24–21	78,807
September 24	7:00 pm	Vanderbilt	No. 12	Williams-Brice Stadium; Columbia, SC	ESPN2	W 21–3	77,015
October 1	3:30 pm	Auburn	No. 10	Williams-Brice Stadium; Columbia, SC	CBS	L 13–16	81,767
October 8	12:21 pm	Kentucky	No. 18	Williams-Brice Stadium; Columbia, SC	SECN	W 54–3	75,838
October 15	12:21 pm	at Mississippi State	No. 15	Davis Wade Stadium; Starkville, MS	SECN	W 14–12	55,418
October 29	7:15 pm	at Tennessee	No. 14	Neyland Stadium; Knoxville, TN	ESPN2	W 14–3	96,655
November 5	7:15 pm	at No. 8 Arkansas	No. 10	Donald W. Reynolds Razorback Stadium; Fayetteville, AR	ESPN	L 28–44	73,804
November 12	12:00 pm	Florida^{†}	No. 15	Williams-Brice Stadium; Columbia, SC	CBS	W 17–12	80,250
November 19	12:00 pm	The Citadel*	No. 14	Williams-Brice Stadium; Columbia, SC	FSS	W 41–20	76,816
November 26	7:45 pm	No. 18 Clemson*	No. 14	Williams-Brice Stadium; Columbia, SC (Palmetto Bowl)	ESPN	W 34–13	83,442
January 2, 2012	1:00 pm	vs. No. 21 Nebraska*	No. 10	Citrus Bowl; Orlando, FL (Capital One Bowl)	ESPN	W 30–13	61,351
*Non-conference game; ^{†}Homecoming; Rankings from AP Poll released prior to the game; All times are in Eastern time

== Game summaries ==
=== Vs. East Carolina ===
Team	1	2	3	4	Total
Pirates	7	17	7	6	37
• No. 12 Gamecocks	0	14	28	14	56

- Date: September 3
- Location: Bank of America Stadium, Charlotte, North Carolina
- Game start: 7:00 p.m. EDT
- Game attendance: 58,272

Statistics	ECU	SC
First downs	21	16
Total yards	345	351
Rushing yards	85	220
Passing yards	260	137
Passing: Comp–Att–Int	37–56–1	10–25–0
Turnovers	5	4

Team	Category	Player	Statistics
East Carolina	Passing	Dominique Davis	37/56, 260 yards, 4 TD, INT
East Carolina	Rushing	Reggie Bullock	18 rushes, 67 yards
East Carolina	Receiving	Lance Lewis	13 receptions, 108 yards, 2 TD
South Carolina	Passing	Stephen Garcia	7/15, 110 yards, TD
South Carolina	Rushing	Marcus Lattimore	23 rushes, 112 yards, 3 TD
South Carolina	Receiving	Alshon Jeffery	5 receptions, 92 yards

=== At Georgia ===
Team	1	2	3	4	Total
• No. 12 Gamecocks	0	14	14	17	45
Bulldogs	6	7	7	22	42

- Date: September 10
- Location: Sanford Stadium, Athens, Georgia
- Game start: 4:30 p.m. EDT
- Game attendance: 92,746

Statistics	SC	UGA
First downs	15	23
Total yards	395	436
Rushing yards	253	188
Passing yards	149	280
Passing: Comp–Att–Int	11–26–2	19–29–1
Turnovers	2	3

Team	Category	Player	Statistics
South Carolina	Passing	Stephen Garcia	11/25, 142 yards, TD, 2 INT
South Carolina	Rushing	Marcus Lattimore	27 rushes, 176 yards, TD
South Carolina	Receiving	Alshon Jeffery	5 receptions, 85 yards, TD
Georgia	Passing	Aaron Murray	19/29, 248 yards, 4 TD, INT
Georgia	Rushing	Isaiah Crowell	16 rushes, 118 yards, TD
Georgia	Receiving	Malcolm Mitchell	5 receptions, 52 yards

=== Navy ===
Team	1	2	3	4	Total
Midshipmen	7	7	7	0	21
• No. 10 Gamecocks	7	10	0	7	24

- Date: September 17
- Location: Williams-Brice Stadium, Columbia, South Carolina
- Game start: 6:00 p.m. EDT
- Game attendance: 78,807

Statistics	NAVY	SC
First downs	15	27
Total yards	335	458
Rushing yards	274	254
Passing yards	61	209
Passing: Comp–Att–Int	5–9–1	18–25–1
Turnovers	1	1

Team	Category	Player	Statistics
Navy	Passing	Kriss Proctor	5/9, 61 yards, INT
Navy	Rushing	Alexander Teich	15 rushes, 93 yards, TD
Navy	Receiving	Bo Snelson	1 reception, 33 yards
South Carolina	Passing	Stephen Garcia	18/25, 204 yards, INT
South Carolina	Rushing	Marcus Lattimore	37 rushes, 246 yards, 3 TD
South Carolina	Receiving	Nick Jones	3 receptions, 52 yards

=== Vanderbilt ===
Team	1	2	3	4	Total
Commodores	3	0	0	0	3
• No. 12 Gamecocks	0	14	7	0	21

- Date: September 24
- Location: Williams-Brice Stadium, Columbia, South Carolina
- Game start: 7:00 p.m. EDT
- Game attendance: 77,015

Statistics	VAN	SC
First downs	5	17
Total yards	77	367
Rushing yards	4	131
Passing yards	73	236
Passing: Comp–Att–Int	16–23–1	17–32–4
Turnovers	3	4

Team	Category	Player	Statistics
Vanderbilt	Passing	Larry Smith	12/16, 44 yards, INT
Vanderbilt	Rushing	Zac Stacy	7 rushes, 18 yards
Vanderbilt	Receiving	Jonathan Krause	9 receptions, 55 yards
South Carolina	Passing	Stephen Garcia	16/30, 228 yards, TD, 4 INT
South Carolina	Rushing	Marcus Lattimore	20 rushes, 77 yards, TD
South Carolina	Receiving	Ace Sanders	4 receptions, 75 yards

=== Auburn ===
Team	1	2	3	4	Total
• Tigers	3	6	0	7	16
No. 10 Gamecocks	6	0	7	0	13

- Date: October 1
- Location: Williams-Brice Stadium, Columbia, South Carolina
- Game start: 3:30 p.m. EDT
- Game attendance: 81,767

Statistics	AUB	SC
First downs	22	13
Total yards	358	289
Rushing yards	246	129
Passing yards	112	160
Passing: Comp–Att–Int	12–25–4	9–23–2
Turnovers	4	4

Team	Category	Player	Statistics
Auburn	Passing	Barrett Trotter	12/23, 112 yards, TD, 2 INT
Auburn	Rushing	Michael Dyer	41 rushes, 141 yards, TD
Auburn	Receiving	Ontario McCalebb	3 receptions, 33 yards
South Carolina	Passing	Stephen Garcia	9/23, 160 yards, TD, 2 INT
South Carolina	Rushing	Marcus Lattimore	17 rushes, 66 yards, TD
South Carolina	Receiving	Alshon Jeffery	5 receptions, 86 yards, TD

=== Kentucky ===
Team	1	2	3	4	Total
Wildcats	3	0	0	0	3
• No. 18 Gamecocks	7	13	13	21	54

- Date: October 8
- Location: Williams-Brice Stadium, Columbia, South Carolina
- Game start: 12:21 p.m. EDT
- Game attendance: 75,838

Statistics	UK	SC
First downs	6	32
Total yards	96	639
Rushing yards	79	288
Passing yards	17	351
Passing: Comp–Att–Int	4–26–4	30–43–0
Turnovers	6	1

Team	Category	Player	Statistics
Kentucky	Passing	Morgan Newton	4/21, 17 yards, INT
Kentucky	Rushing	Morgan Newton	14 rushes, 54 yards
Kentucky	Receiving	La'rod King	1 reception, 8 yards
South Carolina	Passing	Connor Shaw	26/39, 311 yards, 4 TD
South Carolina	Rushing	Marcus Lattimore	22 rushes, 102 yards
South Carolina	Receiving	Alshon Jeffery	6 receptions, 95 yards, 2 TD

=== At Mississippi State ===
Team	1	2	3	4	Total
• No. 15 Gamecocks	0	7	0	7	14
Bulldogs	7	0	0	5	12

- Date: October 15
- Location: Davis Wade Stadium, Starkville, Mississippi
- Game start: 12:21 p.m. EDT
- Game attendance: 55,418

Statistics	SC	MSST
First downs	18	18
Total yards	289	296
Rushing yards	110	131
Passing yards	179	165
Passing: Comp–Att–Int	22–32–2	11–30–2
Turnovers	2	2

Team	Category	Player	Statistics
South Carolina	Passing	Connor Shaw	20/28, 155 yards, TD, 2 INT
South Carolina	Rushing	Marcus Lattimore	17 rushes, 39 yards, TD
South Carolina	Receiving	Nick Jones	4 receptions, 45 yards
Mississippi State	Passing	Tyler Russell	11/29, 165 yards, TD, 2 INT
Mississippi State	Rushing	Vick Ballard	20 rushes, 67 yards
Mississippi State	Receiving	Arceto Clark	4 receptions, 54 yards

=== At Tennessee ===
Team	1	2	3	4	Total
• No. 14 Gamecocks	0	7	7	0	14
Volunteers	3	0	0	0	3

- Date: October 29
- Location: Neyland Stadium, Knoxville, Tennessee
- Game start: 7:15 p.m. EDT
- Game attendance: 96,655

Statistics	SC	TENN
First downs	20	10
Total yards	318	186
Rushing yards	231	35
Passing yards	87	151
Passing: Comp–Att–Int	10–18–1	15–38–2
Turnovers	3	2

Team	Category	Player	Statistics
South Carolina	Passing	Connor Shaw	10/18, 87 yards, TD, INT
South Carolina	Rushing	Brandon Wilds	28 rushes, 137 yards
South Carolina	Receiving	Brandon Wilds	3 receptions, 31 yards
Tennessee	Passing	Justin Worley	10/26, 105 yards, 2 INT
Tennessee	Rushing	Tauren Poole	18 rushes, 38 yards
Tennessee	Receiving	Deanthony Arnett	3 receptions, 59 yards

=== At No. 8 Arkansas ===
Team	1	2	3	4	Total
No. 10 Gamecocks	7	7	7	7	28
• No. 8 Razorbacks	10	14	6	14	44

- Date: November 5
- Location: Razorback Stadium, Fayetteville, Arkansas
- Game start: 7:15 p.m. EDT
- Game attendance: 73,804

Statistics	SC	ARK
First downs	17	20
Total yards	207	435
Rushing yards	79	136
Passing yards	128	299
Passing: Comp–Att–Int	16–25–1	20–38–1
Turnovers	4	1

Team	Category	Player	Statistics
South Carolina	Passing	Connor Shaw	16/25, 128 yards, INT
South Carolina	Rushing	Connor Shaw	14 rushes, 24 yards, 2 TD
South Carolina	Receiving	Kenny Miles	2 receptions, 30 yards
Arkansas	Passing	Tyler Wilson	20/37, 299 yards, 2 TD, INT
Arkansas	Rushing	Dennis Johnson	15 rushes, 86 yards
Arkansas	Receiving	Jarius Wright	4 receptions, 103 yards, 2 TD

=== Florida ===
Team	1	2	3	4	Total
Gators	3	0	3	6	12
• No. 15 Gamecocks	0	14	0	3	17

- Date: November 12
- Location: Williams-Brice Stadium, Columbia, South Carolina
- Game start: 12:00 p.m. EST
- Game attendance: 80,250

Statistics	FLA	SC
First downs	17	16
Total yards	261	299
Rushing yards	142	215
Passing yards	119	84
Passing: Comp–Att–Int	13–23–0	7–13–1
Turnovers	2	1

Team	Category	Player	Statistics
Florida	Passing	John Brantley	13/21, 119 yards
Florida	Rushing	Chris Rainey	17 rushes, 132 yards
Florida	Receiving	Jordan Reed	5 receptions, 62 yards
South Carolina	Passing	Connor Shaw	6/12, 81 yards, INT
South Carolina	Rushing	Brandon Wilds	29 rushes, 120 yards
South Carolina	Receiving	Ace Sanders	2 receptions, 50 yards

=== The Citadel ===
Team	1	2	3	4	Total
Bulldogs	7	6	0	7	20
• No. 14 Gamecocks	7	13	7	14	41

- Date: November 19
- Location: Williams-Brice Stadium, Columbia, South Carolina
- Game start: 12:00 p.m. EST
- Game attendance: 76,816

Statistics	CIT	SC
First downs	19	22
Total yards	249	473
Rushing yards	241	256
Passing yards	8	217
Passing: Comp–Att–Int	1–2–0	16–18–1
Turnovers	0	1

Team	Category	Player	Statistics
The Citadel	Passing	Aaron Miller	1/1, 8 yards
The Citadel	Rushing	Darien Robinson	20 rushes, 88 yards, TD
The Citadel	Receiving	Rickey Robinson	1 reception, 8 yards
South Carolina	Passing	Connor Shaw	16/18, 217 yards, 3 TD, INT
South Carolina	Rushing	Brandon Wilds	20 rushes, 109 yards, 2 TD
South Carolina	Receiving	Alshon Jeffery	5 receptions, 81 yards, TD

=== No. 18 Clemson ===
No. 18 Clemson Tigers (9-2) at No. 14 South Carolina Gamecocks (9-2) – Game summary

Quarter	1	2	3	4	Total
No. 18 Tigers	0	10	0	3	13
No. 14 Gamecocks	10	7	7	10	34

at Williams-Brice Stadium • Columbia, South Carolina

- Date: November 26
- Game time: 7:45 p.m. EST
- Game weather: Clear
- TV: ESPN

Game information

First quarter

- (10:23) SC – Jay Wooten 47-yard field goal (Drive: 10 plays, 48 yards, 4:37; South Carolina 3-0)
- (6:36) SC – Bruce Ellington 49-yard pass from Connor Shaw (Jay Wooten kick) (Drive: 7 plays, 75 yards, 2:52; South Carolina 10-0)

Second quarter

- (11:32) CLEM – Dwayne Allen 9-yard pass from Tajh Boyd (Chandler Catanzaro kick) (Drive: 12 plays, 61 yards, 4:47; South Carolina 10-7)
- (6:14) CLEM – Chandler Catanzaro 32-yard field goal (Drive: 5 plays, 11 yards, 1:01; Tied 10-10)
- (1:55) SC – Connor Shaw 15-yard run (Jay Wooten kick) (Drive: 9 plays, 60 yards, 4:19; South Carolina 17-10)

Third quarter

- (9:52) SC – Rory Anderson 2-yard pass from Connor Shaw (Jay Wooten kick) (Drive: 5 plays, 66 yards, 2:18; South Carolina 24-10)

Fourth quarter

- (13:48) CLEM – Chandler Catanzaro 40-yard field goal (Drive: 8 plays, 13 yards, 2:39; South Carolina 24-13)
- (6:26) SC – Jay Wooten 37-yard field goal (Drive: 14 plays, 50 yards, 7:22; South Carolina 27-13)
- (5:20) SC – Alshon Jeffery 18-yard pass from Connor Shaw (Jay Wooten kick) (Drive: 2 plays, 19 yards, 0:41; South Carolina 34-13)

Statistics	CLEM	SC
First downs	12	19
Total yards	153	420
Rushing yards	70	210
Passing yards	117	226
Passing: Comp–Att–Int	11–30–1	14–20–0
Turnovers	1	0

Team	Category	Player	Statistics
Clemson	Passing	Tahj Boyd	11/29, 83 yards, TD, INT
Clemson	Rushing	Andre Ellington	13 rushes, 66 yards
Clemson	Receiving	Sammy Watkins	4 receptions, 39 yards
South Carolina	Passing	Connor Shaw	14/20, 210 yards, 3 TD
South Carolina	Rushing	Connor Shaw	19 rushes, 107 yards, TD
South Carolina	Receiving	Bruce Ellington	3 receptions, 71 yards, TD

=== Vs. No. 21 Nebraska (Capital One Bowl) ===
Team	1	2	3	4	Total
No. 21 Cornhuskers	13	0	0	0	13
• No. 10 Gamecocks	9	7	0	14	30

- Date: January 2, 2012
- Location: Citrus Bowl, Orlando, Florida
- Game start: 1:00 p.m. EST
- Game attendance: 61,351

Statistics	NEB	SC
First downs	17	16
Total yards	253	351
Rushing yards	137	121
Passing yards	116	230
Passing: Comp–Att–Int	10–16–1	11–17–0
Turnovers	2	0

Team	Category	Player	Statistics
Nebraska	Passing	Taylor Martinez	10/16, 116 yards, TD, INT
Nebraska	Rushing	Rex Burkhead	23 rushes, 89 yards
Nebraska	Receiving	Kenny Bell	3 receptions, 53 yards, TD
South Carolina	Passing	Connor Shaw	11/17, 230 yards, 2 TD
South Carolina	Rushing	Kenny Miles	15 rushes, 67 yards, TD
South Carolina	Receiving	Alshon Jeffery	4 receptions, 148 yards, TD

== Players ==
=== Depth chart ===
Projected starters and primary backups versus Clemson on November 26, 2011.

Defense

FS
D. J. Swearinger
Jimmy Legree

WLB	MLB	SLB
⋅	Shaq Wilson	⋅
Quin Smith	Rodney Paulk	⋅

SS
DeVonte Holloman
Brison Williams

CB
C.C. Whitlock
Marty Markett

DE	DT	DT	DE
Melvin Ingram	Kelcy Quarles	Travian Robertson	Devin Taylor
Jadeveon Clowney	Aldrick Fordham	Byron Jerideau	Chaz Sutton

CB
Stephon Gilmore
Victor Hampton

Offense

WR
Alshon Jeffery
Nick Jones

LT	LG	C	RG	RT
Rokevious Watkins	A. J. Cann	T.J. Johnson	Terrence Campbell	Mike Matulis
Mike Matulis	Kyle Harris	Travis Ford	Ronald Patrick	Cody Gibson

TE
Justice Cunningham
Rory Anderson

WR
Ace Sanders
Bruce Ellington

QB
Connor Shaw
Dylan Thompson

Key reserves
RB Eric Baker
WR DeAngelo Smith
WR Lamar Scruggs
WR Damiere Byrd
WR D.L. Moore
WR Jason Barnes
DE Byron McKnight
LB Qua Gilchrist

RB
Brandon Wilds
Kenny Miles

FB
Dalton Wilson
Connor McLaurin

Special teams
PK Jay Wooten
P Joey Scribner-Howard
KR Bruce Ellington
PR Ace Sanders
LS Walker Inabinet
H Seth Strickland

=== Awards ===
- Antonio Allen – AP Second-Team All-SEC; AP Second-Team All-American
- A.J. Cann – Coaches SEC All-Freshman Team
- Jadeveon Clowney – Coaches Second-Team All-SEC; Coaches SEC All-Freshman Team; SEC Freshman of the Year; Sporting News All-Freshman Team
- Bruce Ellington – SEC Co-Freshman of the Week, 10/17/11; Coaches SEC All-Freshman Team
- Melvin Ingram – Walter Camp National Defensive Player of the Week, 9/11/11; SEC Special Teams Player of the Week, 9/12/11; SEC Defensive Player of the Week, 9/26/11; SEC Defensive Player of the Week, 10/3/11; AP & Coaches First-Team All-SEC; AFCA All-American Team; Walter Camp First-Team All-American; AP First-Team All-American; Sporting News All-American Team
- Alshon Jeffery – AP Second-Team All-SEC; Capital One Bowl MVP
- Marcus Lattimore – SEC Co-Offensive Player of the Week, 9/19/11; AP & Coaches Second-Team All-SEC
- Mike Matulis – Sporting News All-Freshman Team
- Travian Robertson – SEC Defensive Lineman of the Week, 10/14/11
- Connor Shaw – SEC Offensive Player of the Week, 10/10/11; SEC Co-Offensive Player of the Week, 11/28/11
- D.J. Swearinger – SEC Co-Defensive Player of the Week, 10/17/11
- Rokevious Watkins – SEC Offensive Lineman of the Week, 9/5/11; AP First-Team All-SEC; Coaches Second-Team All-SEC
- Brandon Wilds – SEC Freshman of the Week, 10/31/11
- Dalton Wilson – Capital One Academic All-America Second Team

=== 2011 recruiting class ===
College recruiting
Name	Hometown	School	Height	Weight	40^{‡}	Commit date
Jerell Adams; TE	Summerton, SC	Scotts Branch HS	6 ft 5 in (1.96 m)	220 lb (100 kg)	4.53	Jan 31, 2011
Jerell Adams; TE	Recruit ratings: Scout: Rivals: (76)					
Rory Anderson; TE	Powder Springs, GA	McEachern HS	6 ft 5 in (1.96 m)	205 lb (93 kg)	4.65	Jan 19, 2011
Rory Anderson; TE	Recruit ratings: Scout: Rivals: (79)					
K. J. Brent; WR	Waxhaw, NC	Marvin Ridge HS	6 ft 4 in (1.93 m)	180 lb (82 kg)	4.5	Apr 14, 2010
K. J. Brent; WR	Recruit ratings: Scout: Rivals: (75)					
Kaleb Broome; OL	Milledgeville, GA	Georgia Military College	6 ft 6 in (1.98 m)	315 lb (143 kg)	4.97	Jul 23, 2010
Kaleb Broome; OL	Recruit ratings: Scout: Rivals: (-)					
Damiere Byrd; WR	Sicklerville, NJ	Timber Creek HS	5 ft 10 in (1.78 m)	160 lb (73 kg)	4.27	Feb 4, 2011
Damiere Byrd; WR	Recruit ratings: Scout: Rivals: (78)					
Shon Carson; RB	Scranton, SC	Lake City HS	5 ft 10 in (1.78 m)	195 lb (88 kg)	4.4	Oct 10, 2010
Shon Carson; RB	Recruit ratings: Scout: Rivals: (77)					
Ahmad Christian; DB	Jacksonville, FL	Trinity Christian HS	5 ft 10 in (1.78 m)	190 lb (86 kg)	4.5	Jan 23, 2011
Ahmad Christian; DB	Recruit ratings: Scout: Rivals: (77)					
Jadeveon Clowney; DE	Rock Hill, SC	South Pointe HS	6 ft 6 in (1.98 m)	245 lb (111 kg)	4.6	Feb 14, 2011
Jadeveon Clowney; DE	Recruit ratings: Scout: Rivals: (95)					
Cedrick Cooper; LB	Lithonia, GA	Lithonia HS	6 ft 2 in (1.88 m)	205 lb (93 kg)	4.5	Feb 2, 2011
Cedrick Cooper; LB	Recruit ratings: Scout: Rivals: (78)					
Gerald Dixon; DE	Rock Hill, SC	South Pointe HS	6 ft 2 in (1.88 m)	240 lb (110 kg)	-	Jan 4, 2011
Gerald Dixon; DE	Recruit ratings: Scout: Rivals: (77)					
Gerald Dixon, Jr. DT	Rock Hill, SC	Northwestern HS	6 ft 2 in (1.88 m)	270 lb (120 kg)	5.0	Jan 4, 2011
Gerald Dixon, Jr. DT	Recruit ratings: Scout: Rivals: (71)					
Phillip Dukes; DT	Manning, SC	Manning HS	6 ft 3 in (1.91 m)	290 lb (130 kg)	5.0	Feb 1, 2011
Phillip Dukes; DT	Recruit ratings: Scout: Rivals: (79)					
Deon Green; DT	Orlando, FL	Olympia HS	6 ft 4 in (1.93 m)	270 lb (120 kg)	-	Jun 29, 2010
Deon Green; DT	Recruit ratings: Scout: Rivals: (78)					
Kyle Harris; OT	Lindale, GA	Pepperell HS	6 ft 4 in (1.93 m)	280 lb (130 kg)	4.97	Nov 7, 2010
Kyle Harris; OT	Recruit ratings: Scout: Rivals: (79)					
Mason Harris; LB	Rossville, GA	Ridgeland HS	6 ft 3 in (1.91 m)	210 lb (95 kg)	4.5	Jun 7, 2010
Mason Harris; LB	Recruit ratings: Scout: Rivals: (76)					
Shamier Jeffery; WR	St. Matthews, SC	Calhoun County HS	6 ft 2 in (1.88 m)	195 lb (88 kg)	4.6	Nov 29, 2010
Shamier Jeffery; WR	Recruit ratings: Scout: Rivals: (79)					
Kadetrix Marcus; DB	Stone Mountain, GA	Stephenson HS	6 ft 1 in (1.85 m)	190 lb (86 kg)	4.6	Nov 7, 2010
Kadetrix Marcus; DB	Recruit ratings: Scout: Rivals: (80)					
Ronnie Martin; DB	Spartanburg, SC	Spartanburg HS	5 ft 11 in (1.80 m)	180 lb (82 kg)	4.4	Aug 4, 2010
Ronnie Martin; DB	Recruit ratings: Scout: Rivals: (77)					
Martay Mattox; ATH	Athens, GA	Clarke Central HS	6 ft 1 in (1.85 m)	185 lb (84 kg)	4.5	May 17, 2010
Martay Mattox; ATH	Recruit ratings: Scout: Rivals: (74)					
Mike Matulis; OT	Lake Worth, FL	Park Vista HS	6 ft 6 in (1.98 m)	275 lb (125 kg)	5.1	Jul 24, 2010
Mike Matulis; OT	Recruit ratings: Scout: Rivals: (76)					
Tanner McEvoy; QB	Oradell, NJ	Bergen Catholic HS	6 ft 6 in (1.98 m)	210 lb (95 kg)	4.6	Jan 20, 2011
Tanner McEvoy; QB	Recruit ratings: Scout: Rivals: (78)					
Quincy McKinney; OL	Columbus, GA	Carver HS	6 ft 4 in (1.93 m)	295 lb (134 kg)	-	Aug 25, 2010
Quincy McKinney; OL	Recruit ratings: Scout: Rivals: (78)					
Edward Muldrow; LB	Snellville, GA	South Gwinnett HS	6 ft 3 in (1.91 m)	190 lb (86 kg)	4.7	Jun 19, 2010
Edward Muldrow; LB	Recruit ratings: Scout: Rivals: (79)					
Drew Owens; TE	Charlotte, NC	Ardrey Kell HS	6 ft 5 in (1.96 m)	230 lb (100 kg)	4.8	Dec 20, 2010
Drew Owens; TE	Recruit ratings: Scout: Rivals: (79)					
Kelcy Quarles; DT	Fork Union, VA	Fork Union Military Academy	6 ft 4 in (1.93 m)	265 lb (120 kg)	-	Nov 24, 2008
Kelcy Quarles; DT	Recruit ratings: Scout: Rivals: (-)					
Marcquis Roberts; LB	Powder Springs, GA	McEachern HS	6 ft 1 in (1.85 m)	205 lb (93 kg)	4.7	Jan 19, 2011
Marcquis Roberts; LB	Recruit ratings: Scout: Rivals: (78)					
Sheldon Royster; DB	Jersey City, NJ	St. Peter's Prep	6 ft 0 in (1.83 m)	190 lb (86 kg)	-	Jan 20, 2011
Sheldon Royster; DB	Recruit ratings: Scout: Rivals: (77)					
Brandon Shell; OL	Charleston, SC	Goose Creek HS	6 ft 7 in (2.01 m)	310 lb (140 kg)	5.35	Nov 1, 2010
Brandon Shell; OL	Recruit ratings: Scout: Rivals: (79)					
Will Sport; OL	Pace, FL	Pace HS	6 ft 6 in (1.98 m)	275 lb (125 kg)	-	Oct 4, 2010
Will Sport; OL	Recruit ratings: Scout: Rivals: (76)					
Angelo Watley; LB	Suwanee, GA	Peachtree Ridge HS	6 ft 3 in (1.91 m)	230 lb (100 kg)	-	Jun 25, 2010
Angelo Watley; LB	Recruit ratings: Scout: Rivals: (76)					
Brandon Wilds; RB	Blythewood, SC	Blythewood HS	6 ft 1 in (1.85 m)	220 lb (100 kg)	4.5	Aug 19, 2010
Brandon Wilds; RB	Recruit ratings: Scout: Rivals: (76)					
Brison Williams; DB	Fork Union, VA	Fork Union Military Academy	5 ft 11 in (1.80 m)	200 lb (91 kg)	-	Aug 25, 2010
Brison Williams; DB	Recruit ratings: Scout: Rivals: (-)					
Overall recruit ranking: Scout: 12 Rivals: 18 ESPN: 15
‡ Refers to 40-yard dash; Note: In many cases, Scout, Rivals, 247Sports, On3, and ESPN may conflict in their listings of height, weight and 40 time.; In these cases, the average was taken. ESPN grades are on a 100-point scale.; Sources: "South Carolina Signee List 2011". Rivals.; "Scout.com Football Recruiting: South Carolina". Scout.; "2011 Player Signees- South Carolina". ESPN.; "Scout.com Team Recruiting Rankings". Scout.; "2011 Team Ranking". Rivals.com.

== NCAA investigation ==
The University of South Carolina was investigated in 2011 by the NCAA after it came to light that student-athletes (including some football players) had received an estimated $59,000 in impermissible benefits, mainly the result of discounted living expenses at a local hotel. The school imposed its own punishment, paying $18,500 in fines and cutting three football scholarships in each of the 2013 and 2014 seasons. The school also reduced its official visits for the 2012–13 year, from 56 to 30. The NCAA ruled this self-imposed punishment as adequate, stating that "the violations were limited in scope" and "there was no unethical conduct in this case", and went on to praise the school's handling of the affair, with the chairman of the NCAA infractions committee stating, "This has been one of the best cases I have seen from a process standpoint. . . . In this case, it was obvious to the committee that the university wanted to get to the truth." The commissioner went on to state that USC "wanted to ask all the hard questions of all the right people and, in some cases, they even went beyond what the NCAA staff was doing."

== Rankings ==
Ranking movements Legend: ██ Increase in ranking ██ Decrease in ranking
	Week															
Poll	Pre	1	2	3	4	5	6	7	8	9	10	11	12	13	14	Final
AP	12	12	10	12	10	18	15	14	14	10	15	14	14	14	10	9
Coaches	12	12	11	10	9	14	13	12	14	10	15	14	13	13	9	8
Harris	Not released						15	13	14	11	16	15	13	14	9	Not released
BCS	Not released							14	13	9	13	12	12	12	9	Not released

== Coaching staff ==
- Steve Spurrier – Head coach
- Ellis Johnson – Assistant head coach, defensive coordinator
- Lorenzo Ward – Defensive coordinator, cornerbacks coach
- John Butler – Special teams coordinator
- Shawn Elliott – Offensive line coach, running game coordinator
- Craig Fitzgerald – Strength & conditioning coach
- Jay Graham – Running backs and tight ends coach
- Jeep Hunter – Safeties coach
- Brad Lawing – Defensive line coach
- G. A. Mangus – Quarterbacks coach
- Steve Spurrier, Jr. – Wide receivers coach
