= 2012 Capital One Bowl =

American college football game

- 66th Citrus Bowl
Nebraska Cornhuskers	South Carolina Gamecocks
(9–3)	(10–2)
Big Ten	SEC
13	30
Head coach: Bo Pelini	Head coach: Steve Spurrier
AP / Coaches / BCS; 21 / 20 / 20	AP / Coaches / BCS; 10 / 9 / 9
	1	2	3	4	Total
Nebraska	13	0	0	0	13
South Carolina	9	7	0	14	30
- Date: January 2, 2012
- Season: 2011
- Stadium: Florida Citrus Bowl
- Location: Orlando, Florida
- MVP: Alshon Jeffery (South Carolina WR)
- Favorite: South Carolina by 1
- Referee: Jerry McGinn (Big East)
- Attendance: 61,351
- Payout: US$4.55 million

United States TV coverage
- Network: ESPN
- Announcers: Joe Tessitore (play-by-play); Rod Gilmore (analyst); Quint Kessenich (sideline)
- Nielsen ratings: 2.86

The 2012 Citrus Bowl, known as the Capital One Bowl for sponsorship purposes, was the sixty-sixth edition of the college football bowl game, played on January 2, 2012 at the Florida Citrus Bowl in Orlando, Florida. Part of the 2011–12 bowl season, it featured No. 20 Nebraska of the Big Ten and No. 9 South Carolina of the SEC. The game began at 1:00 p.m. EST and was broadcast on ESPN.

== Game ==
Nebraska jumped out to a quick lead on a deep Kenny Bell touchdown, but the score was just 6–2 after Stephon Gilmore returned a blocked extra point for a defensive two-point conversion. On the ensuing drive, South Carolina ran eleven consecutive rushing plays, culminating in a one-yard Connor Shaw touchdown on fourth down.

Nebraska regained the lead and had several scoring opportunities throughout the rest of the half, reaching South Carolina territory on four consecutive drives, but was unable to extend its 13–9 advantage. Instead, the Gamecocks converted a 51-yard Hail Mary on the final play of the half, when Alshon Jeffery outreached the NU secondary at the three-yard line before leaping into the end zone.

Nebraska missed a field goal to open the second half and was unable to move the ball consistently for the remainder of the game. Two fourth-quarter Kenny Miles touchdowns pushed Carolina's lead to 30–13, more than enough for a stout Gamecocks defense that held NU to minus-eighteen yards across its final four drives.

The victory capped South Carolina's first eleven-win season and its first top-ten ranking in a final AP or Coaches poll. Jeffery was named most valuable player despite being ejected in the third quarter after a fight with NU cornerback Alfonzo Dennard.

=== Scoring summary ===
Qtr	Time	Drive			Team	Detail	Score	
Qtr	Time	Plays	Yards	TOP	Team	Detail	NU	SCAR
1	11:58	3	46	0:56	NU	Kenny Bell 30-yd pass from Taylor Martinez (defensive conversion)	6	2
1	6:04	11	55	5:54	SCAR	Connor Shaw 1-yd run (Jay Wooten kick)	6	9
1	3:33	8	60	2:31	NU	Ameer Abdullah 1-yd run (Brett Maher kick)	13	9
2	0:00	3	71	0:38	SCAR	Alshon Jeffery 51-yd pass from Shaw (Wooten kick)	13	16
4	12:25	5	41	2:26	SCAR	Kenny Miles 9-yd pass from Shaw (Wooten kick)	13	23
4	3:05	13	71	6:20	SCAR	Miles 3-yd run (Wooten kick)	13	30

=== Individual leaders ===
Team	Category	Player	Statistics
NU	Passing	Taylor Martinez	10/16, 116 yds, 1 TD, 1 INT
NU	Rushing	Rex Burkhead	23 car, 89 yds
NU	Receiving	Kenny Bell	3 rec, 53 yds, TD
SCAR	Passing	Connor Shaw	11/17, 230 yds, 2 TD
SCAR	Rushing	Kenny Miles	15 car, 67 yds, TD
SCAR	Receiving	Alshon Jeffery	4 rec, 148 yds, TD

=== Team statistics ===
Statistic	Nebraska	S. Carolina
First downs	17	16
Rushes-yards	46–137	40–121
Comp.–att.–yards	10–16–116	11–17–230
Total offense	253	351
Turnovers	2	0
Punts–average	5–39.4	5–39.4
Penalties–yards	10–58	6–66
Time of possession	30:49	29:11
