= Brandon Wilds =

American football player (born 1993)

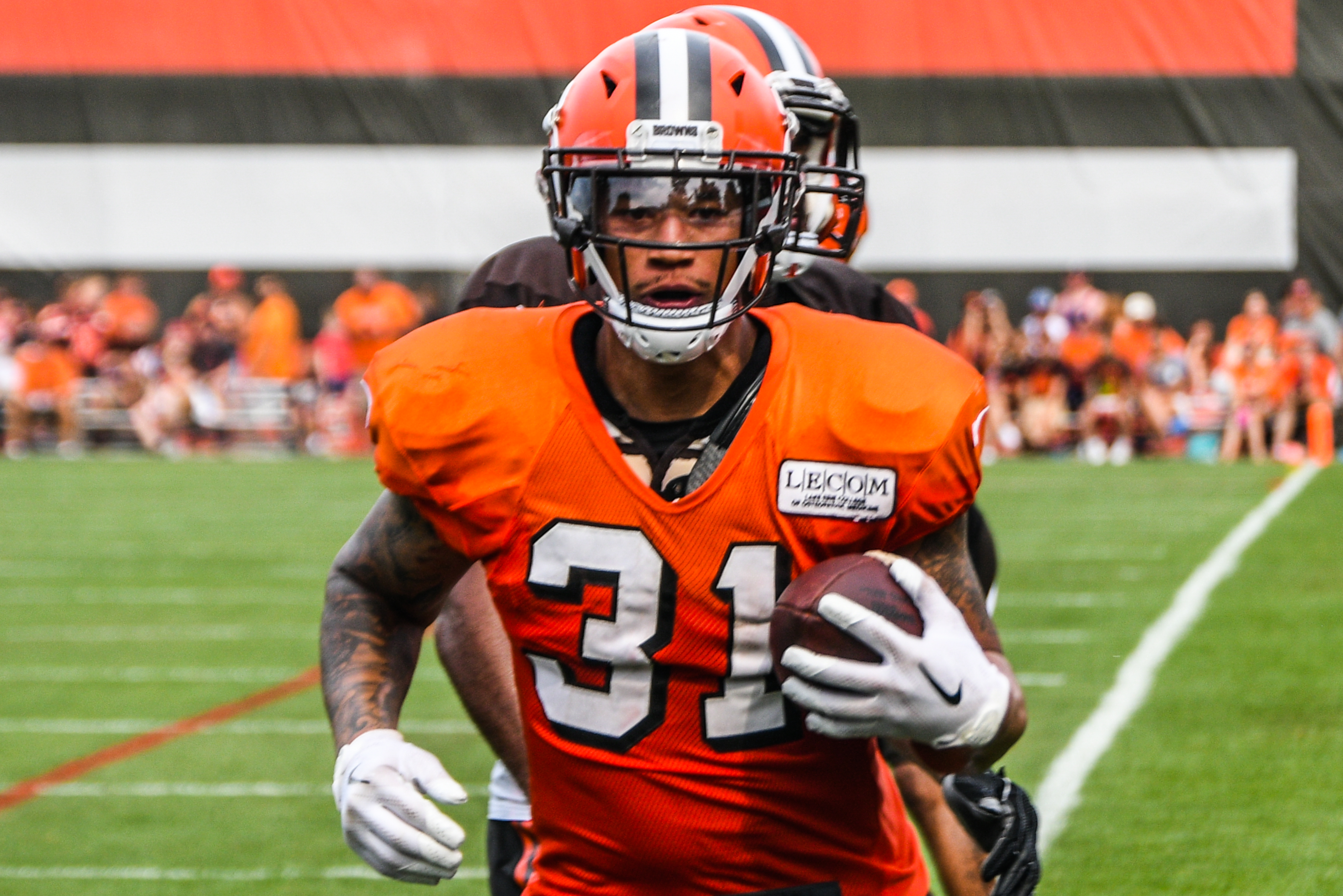
- Wilds with the Cleveland Browns in 2017

No. 34
- Position: Running back

Personal information
- Born: July 22, 1993 (age 33); Blythewood, South Carolina, U.S.
- Listed height: 6 ft 0 in (1.83 m)
- Listed weight: 220 lb (100 kg)

Career information
- High school: Blythewood
- College: South Carolina (2011–2015)
- NFL draft: 2016: undrafted

Career history
- Atlanta Falcons (2016)*; New York Jets (2016); Cleveland Browns (2017); Jacksonville Jaguars (2017–2018); Arizona Cardinals (2018–2019)*; San Francisco 49ers (2019)*; Team 9 (2020)*; Tampa Bay Vipers (2020); Calgary Stampeders (2020)
- * Offseason or practice squad member only

Career NFL statistics
- Rushing yards: 42
- Receptions: 2
- Receiving yards: 20
- Stats at Pro Football Reference

Brandon Wilds (born July 22, 1993) is an American former professional football player who was a running back in the National Football League (NFL). He played college football for the South Carolina Gamecocks and was signed by the Atlanta Falcons as an undrafted free agent in 2016.

== Early life ==
Wilds attended Blythewood High School in Blythewood, South Carolina, and played football under head coach Geremy Saitz. Wilds ran for 1,551 yards and 20 touchdowns as a junior. As a senior, he had 175 rushing attempts for 818 yards and eight touchdowns. He finished his high school football career with a total of 500 carries for 2,700 rushing yards and 29 rushing touchdowns in 33 games.

He graduated from Blythewood in 2011 and was rated a three-star recruit by Rivals.com. Wilds received offers from East Carolina, Arkansas, Maryland, Illinois, and South Carolina.

== College career ==
Wilds began attending South Carolina in 2011 and entered fall camp as the Gamecock's fifth running back on their depth chart. He became the starter after injuries to Marcus Lattimore, Shon Carson, Kenny Miles, and Eric Baker. He finished his freshman campaign with 107 carries for 486 rushing yards and three touchdowns. As a sophomore in 2012, Wilds was redshirted after suffering a high ankle sprain. He returned the following season, but was held to only seven games and two starts after suffering hamstring and elbow injuries. Wilds finished the 2013 season with 43 rushing attempts for 221 rushing yards and three rushing touchdowns. He returned as a junior in 2014 and played in 12 games, starting four. Wilds was South Carolina's second leading rusher with 570 yards and also finished with 106 carries, four rushing touchdowns, 18 receptions, 143 receiving yards, and a receiving touchdown. As a senior, he led the Gamecocks with 567 rushing yards as a senior and started in nine games. Wilds missed three games in the 2015 season with bruised ribs.

=== College statistics ===
Year	School	Conf	Class	Pos	G	Rushing				Receiving			
Year	School	Conf	Class	Pos	G	Att	Yds	Avg	TD	Rec	Yds	Avg	TD
2011	South Carolina	SEC	FR	RB	13	107	486	4.5	3	15	136	9.1	0
2013	South Carolina	SEC	SO	RB	7	43	221	5.1	3	9	119	13.2	2
2014	South Carolina	SEC	JR	RB	12	106	570	5.4	4	18	143	7.9	1
2015	South Carolina	SEC	SR	RB	9	123	567	4.6	3	17	142	8.4	0
Career	South Carolina				41	379	1,844	4.9	13	59	540	9.2	3

== Professional career ==
=== Pre-draft ===
Coming out of South Carolina, Wilds was projected by the majority of analysts to go undrafted and was ranked the 29th best running back by NFLDraftScout.com. He attended and participated in the NFL Scouting Combine. Although he completed all of the possible drills at the combine, Wilds chose to redo the broad jump, vertical jump, short shuttle, and three-cone drill at South Carolina's Pro Day.

Pre-draft measurables
Height	Weight	Arm length	Hand span	40-yard dash	10-yard split	20-yard split	20-yard shuttle	Three-cone drill	Vertical jump	Broad jump	Bench press
6 ft 1 in (1.85 m)	220 lb (100 kg)	32 in (0.81 m)	10 1/4 in (0.26 m)	4.54 s	1.58 s	2.62 s	4.33 s	7.08 s	36 1/2 in (0.93 m)	9 ft 10 in (3.00 m)	21 reps
All values from NFL Combine

=== Atlanta Falcons ===
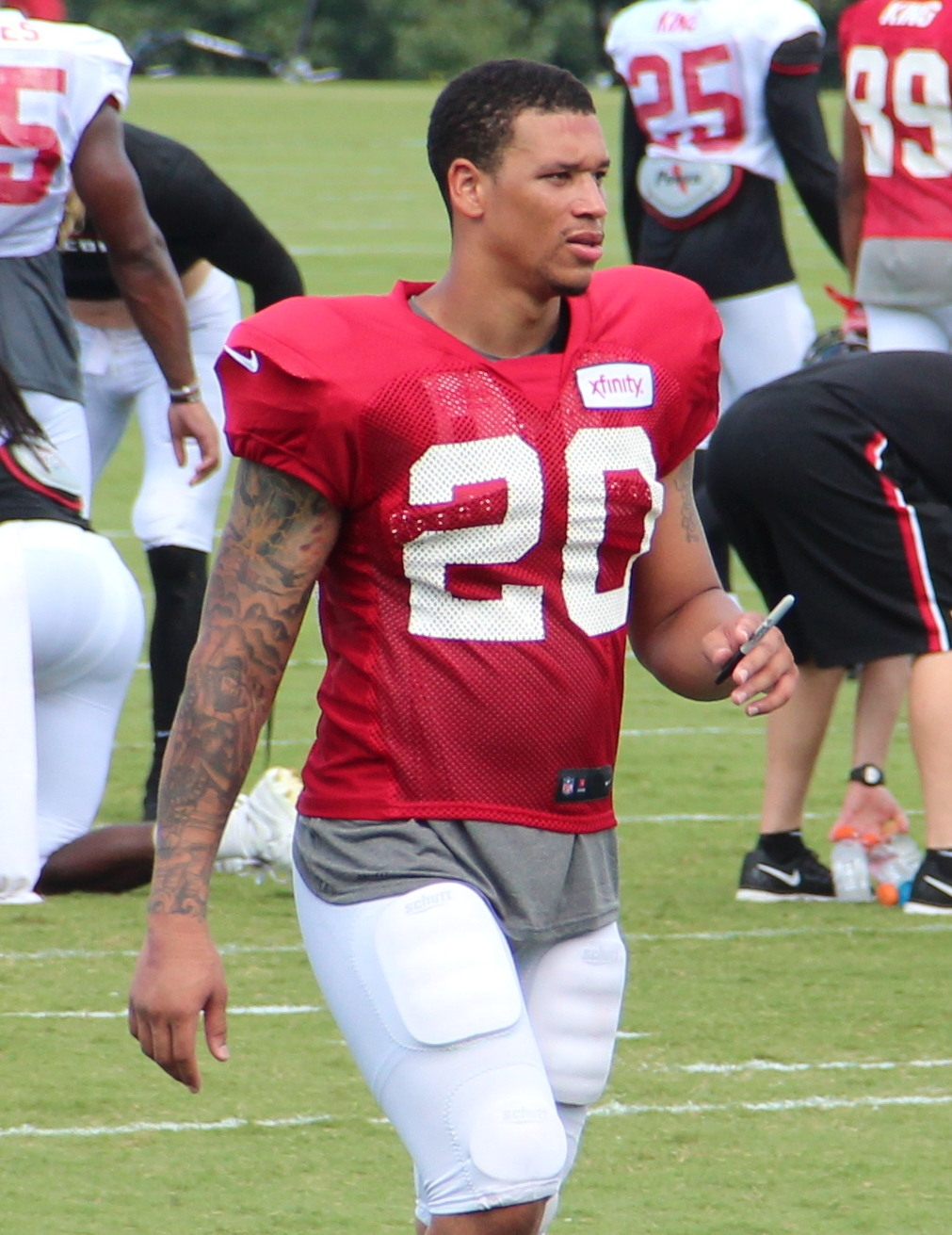
Wilds at 2016 training camp with the Atlanta Falcons

After Wilds went undrafted during the 2016 NFL draft, the Atlanta Falcons signed Wilds as an undrafted free agent on May 5, 2016. Although he had offers from other teams, he chose the Falcons to be closer to his daughter and his filmiliarity with their fullback Patrick DiMarco. He entered training camp competing to be the Falcon's third running back with Terron Ward. On September 3, 2016, the Falcons waived Wilds with an injury settlement.

=== New York Jets ===
On September 26, 2016, the New York Jets signed Wilds to their practice squad. On December 7, 2016, the Jets activated him to their active roster after placing Khiry Robinson on injured-reserve. On December 11, 2016, Wilds made his professional regular season-debut against the San Francisco 49ers, finishing with two carries for four-yards in a 23–17 overtime victory. On December 24, 2016, he had a season-high four rushing attempts for 14 yards in a 41–3 loss to the New England Patriots. The following week, he had four carries for nine yards and two receptions for 20 yards as the Jets routed the Buffalo Bills 30–10. His first career reception was a 12-yard pass from Ryan Fitzpatrick and he also had his first fumble recovery after a fumble by Fitzpatrick.

On July 27, 2017, Wilds was waived by the Jets.

=== Cleveland Browns ===
On July 28, 2017, Wilds was signed by the Cleveland Browns. He was waived/injured on September 1, 2017, and placed on injured reserve. He was released on September 12, 2017.

=== Jacksonville Jaguars ===
On October 9, 2017, Wilds was signed to the Jacksonville Jaguars' practice squad. He signed a reserve/future contract with the Jaguars on January 22, 2018.

On September 1, 2018, Wilds was waived by the Jaguars and was signed to the practice squad the next day. He was promoted to the active roster on September 15, 2018. He was waived on October 9, 2018.

=== Arizona Cardinals ===
On October 15, 2018, Wilds was signed to the Arizona Cardinals practice squad. He signed a reserve/future contract with the Cardinals on December 31, 2018. He was waived on May 10, 2019.

=== San Francisco 49ers ===
On August 10, 2019, Wilds was signed by the San Francisco 49ers. He was waived on August 21, but re-signed six days later. He was waived during final roster cuts on August 30, 2019.

=== Tampa Bay Vipers ===
Wilds signed with the XFL's Team 9 practice squad during the regular season. He was signed off of Team 9 by the Tampa Bay Vipers on March 9, 2020. He had his contract terminated when the league suspended operations on April 10, 2020.

=== Calgary Stampeders ===
Wilds signed with the Calgary Stampeders of the CFL on May 7, 2020. After the CFL canceled the 2020 season due to the COVID-19 pandemic, Wilds chose to opt-out of his contract with the Stampeders on September 3, 2020. He opted back in to his contract on January 11, 2021. He was placed on the suspended list on July 10, 2021.
