= 2010 Holiday Bowl =

2010 Bridgepoint Education Holiday Bowl
- 33rd Holiday Bowl
Nebraska Cornhuskers	Washington Huskies
(10–3)	(6–6)
Big 12	Pac-10
7	19
Head coach: Bo Pelini	Head coach: Steve Sarkisian
AP / Coaches / BCS; 17 / 16 / 18
	1	2	3	4	Total
Nebraska	0	7	0	0	7
Washington	10	0	7	2	19
- Date: December 30, 2010
- Season: 2010
- Stadium: San Diego Stadium
- Location: San Diego, California
- Favorite: Nebraska by 14
- Referee: Land Clark (MW)
- Attendance: 57,921
- Payout: US$2,130,000

United States TV coverage
- Network: ESPN
- Announcers: Chris Fowler (play-by-play); Todd Blackledge (analyst); Erin Andrews (sideline)
- Nielsen ratings: 4.0

The 2010 Holiday Bowl, known as the Bridgepoint Education Holiday Bowl for sponsorship purposes, was the thirty-third edition of the college football bowl game, played on December 30, 2010 at San Diego Stadium in San Diego, California. Part of the 2010–11 bowl season, it featured the Nebraska Cornhuskers of the Big Ten and the Washington Huskies of the Pac-10. The game began at 7:00 p.m. PST and was broadcast on ESPN.

== Teams ==
The 2010 Holiday Bowl was the eighth all-time and first postseason meeting between Nebraska and Washington, with the Cornhuskers leading 4–3–1 prior to the game. The teams met in September 2010, a dominant NU victory in Seattle.

=== Nebraska ===
Big 12 North champion Nebraska entered 10–3, narrowly losing the conference championship game to Oklahoma. The 2010 game was NU's third overall and second consecutive Holiday Bowl appearance.

=== Washington ===
Washington began 3–6, but won its final three games to become bowl-eligible for the first time since 2002. The 2010 game was UW's fourth Holiday Bowl appearance.

== Game ==
Nebraska, a heavy favorite after a dominant win over the Huskies in September, quickly found itself on the wrong foot in a Holiday Bowl rematch when Washington capitalized on a Rex Burkhead fumble to take a 7–0 lead. The next two NU drives both ended on third-down shovel pass attempts by freshman quarterback Taylor Martinez, allowing the Huskies to extend the lead to ten. The Cornhuskers got on the board after a late hit by UW safety Nate Fellner extended a drive that had stalled near midfield.

Washington missed a field goal just before halftime, but took a 10–7 lead into the break despite starting quarterback Jake Locker not completing a pass (running back Jesse Callier completed one to Locker on UW's opening drive).

Locker completed his first pass on UW's opening drive of the third quarter and ran in a touchdown on the following play to put the Huskies up by two scores. Backup Cody Green replaced an injured Martinez on NU's first drive of the fourth quarter, which ended in a safety after a holding penalty in the end zone. Nebraska was unable to mount a scoring threat for the remainder of the game and Washington ran out the clock on a 19–7 victory.

Nebraska finished with a season-low 91 rushing yards after compiling 383 against Washington in September. It was UW's first bowl victory and first four-game win streak since 2001.

=== Scoring summary ===
Qtr	Time	Drive			Team	Detail	Score	
Qtr	Time	Plays	Yards	TOP	Team	Detail	NU	UW
1	9:08	3	21	1:07	UW	Chris Polk 3-yd run (Erik Folk kick)	0	7
1	1:29	8	34	3:05	UW	Folk 39-yd field goal	0	10
2	10:24	10	74	6:05	NU	Kyler Reed 15-yd pass from Taylor Martinez (Alex Henery kick)	7	10
3	13:18	4	53	1:42	UW	Jake Locker 25-yd run (Folk kick)	7	17
4	13:38	–	–	–	UW	Nebraska holding penalty in end zone	7	19

=== Individual leaders ===
Team	Category	Player	Statistics
NU	Passing	Taylor Martinez	7/9, 53 yds, TD, INT
NU	Rushing	Rex Burkhead	12 car, 39 yds
NU	Receiving	Mike McNeill	3 rec, 39 yds
UW	Passing	Jake Locker	5/16, 56 yds
UW	Rushing	Chris Polk	34 car, 177 yds, TD
UW	Receiving	D'Andre Goodwin	2 rec, 30 yds

=== Team statistics ===
Statistic	Nebraska	Washington
First downs	14	21
Rushes–yards	41–91	52–268
Comp.–att.–yards	10–21–98	6–19–72
Total offense	189	340
Turnovers	2	0
Punts–average	6–36.5	4–39.8
Penalties–yards	12–102	3–30
Time of possession	28:56	31:04

== See also ==
- List of college football post-season games that were rematches of regular season games
