= Bo Pelini =

American football player and coach (born 1967)

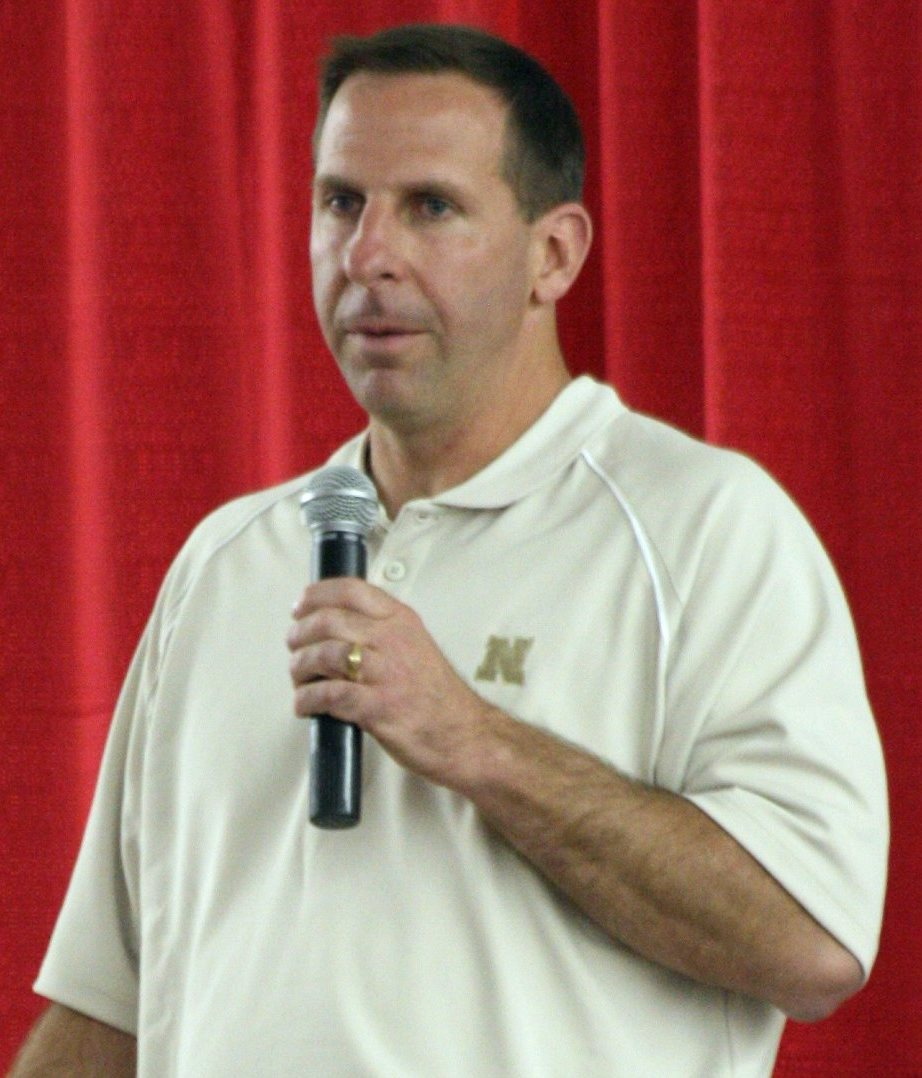
- Pelini in 2008

Biographical details
- Born: December 13, 1967 (age 58); Youngstown, Ohio, U.S.

Playing career
- 1987–1990: Ohio State
- Position: Free safety

Coaching career (HC unless noted)
- 1991: Iowa (GA/AWR)
- 1993: Cardinal Mooney HS (OH) (QB)
- 1994–1996: San Francisco 49ers (DB)
- 1997–1999: New England Patriots (LB)
- 2000–2002: Green Bay Packers (LB)
- 2003: Nebraska (DC)
- 2003: Nebraska (interim HC)
- 2004: Oklahoma (co-DC/DB)
- 2005–2007: LSU (DC)
- 2008–2014: Nebraska
- 2015–2019: Youngstown State
- 2020: LSU (DC)

Head coaching record
- Overall: 100–55
- Bowls: 4–3
- Tournaments: 4–1 (NCAA D-I Playoffs)

Accomplishments and honors

Championships
- 3 Big 12 North Division (2008–2010); Big Ten Legends Division (2012)

Mark Anthony "Bo" Pelini (born December 13, 1967) is an American former football coach and player. He was most recently the defensive coordinator for the Louisiana State University Tigers football team. He is the younger brother of former Florida Atlantic head coach Carl Pelini, who has frequently worked under Bo as an assistant coach.

Pelini served as head coach of the Nebraska Cornhuskers from December 2007 until November 2014 and later served as head coach of the Youngstown State University football team from 2015 through 2019. Prior to leading the football program at Nebraska, he was the defensive coordinator for the LSU Tigers, Oklahoma Sooners, and the Nebraska Cornhuskers.

== Playing career ==
Pelini was raised in Youngstown, Ohio. He was nicknamed "Bo" after former Cleveland Browns running back Bo Scott. After graduating from Cardinal Mooney High School in Youngstown, he went on to play free safety for the Ohio State Buckeyes football team at Ohio State University from 1987 to 1990 under College Football Hall of Fame head coaches Earle Bruce and John Cooper. Pelini started in his last two years and served as a team co-captain in his senior year, along with Vinnie Clark, Jeff Graham, and Greg Frey. He earned his Bachelor of Science degree in business administration from the Fisher College of Business at Ohio State in December 1990.

== Coaching career ==
=== Early career ===
Following his playing career, Pelini began his coaching career at the University of Iowa as a graduate assistant for the Iowa Hawkeyes under Hayden Fry in 1991. During this period, he also completed his master's degree in sports administration from Ohio University in 1992. In 1993, he served for one year as quarterbacks coach at Cardinal Mooney High School in Youngstown. Following the season, Pelini was briefly employed as linebackers coach with the Detroit Drive of the Arena Football League.

=== San Francisco 49ers ===
In 1994, Pelini got his first position in the National Football League when he was hired by San Francisco 49ers head coach George Seifert as a scouting assistant. He was quickly promoted to assistant secondary coach, and by the spring of 1994 he had been promoted again to defensive backs coach. In 1995, in his new position, he coached in his first Super Bowl as the 49ers defeated the San Diego Chargers 49–26 in Super Bowl XXIX.

=== New England Patriots ===
In 1997, Pelini was hired by New England Patriots head coach Pete Carroll, again as defensive backs coach, helping the Patriots reach the playoffs twice during his three years there.

=== Green Bay Packers ===
In 2000, Pelini became the linebackers coach for the Green Bay Packers under head coach Mike Sherman. Green Bay posted a 33–15 record and reached the playoffs twice in Pelini's three years there as linebackers coach.

=== Nebraska Cornhuskers (DC/Int. HC) ===
Pelini returned to the college ranks in 2003 when he was hired as defensive coordinator for the Nebraska Cornhuskers by Head Coach Frank Solich. In 2002, the season prior to his hiring, Cornhuskers' defense was ranked 55th nationally. In his first year it improved to 11th and led the country in turnover margin. At the conclusion of the regular season, despite posting a 9–3 record, Solich was fired by new Nebraska athletic director Steve Pederson. Pelini was named the interim head coach and led the Cornhuskers to a 17–3 win over the Michigan State Spartans in the 2003 Alamo Bowl. Pelini interviewed for the Nebraska head coach position, but Pederson instead decided after a 41-day search to hire Bill Callahan, recently head coach of the Oakland Raiders. The following year, Nebraska's defense fell to 56th nationally.

=== Oklahoma Sooners ===
For 2004, Pelini joined the Oklahoma Sooners as co-defensive coordinator under head coach Bob Stoops, helping the Sooners to a 6th place national rushing defense and 11th place national scoring defense on their way towards winning the 2004 Big 12 Championship Game and a spot in the 2005 BCS National Championship Game, where they were defeated 55–19 by the USC Trojans.

=== LSU Tigers (DC) – First tenure ===
In 2005, Pelini was hired by LSU Tigers Head Coach Les Miles, again as defensive coordinator. His success continued, as LSU was ranked 3rd nationally in overall defense for each of his three years with the Tigers. At the conclusion of the 2007 regular season, the LSU Tigers defeated the Tennessee Volunteers 21–14 in the 2007 SEC Championship Game and went on to win 38–24 against the Ohio State Buckeyes, Pelini's alma mater, in the 2008 BCS National Championship Game.

=== Nebraska Cornhuskers (HC) ===
During the 2007 football season, Nebraska Chancellor Harvey Perlman fired athletic director Steve Pederson, and appointed former Cornhuskers head coach Tom Osborne as Interim Athletic Director. One day after the Cornhuskers' final game of the season, a 65–51 loss to the Colorado Buffaloes and finishing the season with 5 wins and 7 losses, Osborne fired Bill Callahan and announced an immediate search for a new football coach. Pelini was selected after a nine-day search as the next head coach. Two names revealed among five interviewed candidates included Buffalo head coach Turner Gill and Wake Forest Demon Deacons head coach Jim Grobe.

==== 2008 season ====
Nebraska opened up with 3 straight wins against Western Michigan Broncos, San Jose State Spartans, and New Mexico State Aggies. Bo Pelini's arrival saw a renewed interest and optimism in Nebraska football, as evidenced by their record Pay-Per View buys.

Nebraska then proceeded to lose a close game to Virginia Tech Hokies, and then suffered the worst home loss in school history to the Missouri Tigers 52–17 the next week. The first road game of the season produced a loss to the Texas Tech Red Raiders in overtime despite giving up 8.77 yards per play. Then the Huskers traveled to Ames, Iowa and beat a 2–10 Iowa State Cyclones. They came back home and won against the Baylor Bears. Pelini's Huskers then lost on the road the following week to the Oklahoma Sooners by a score of 62–28, where Oklahoma scored 35 straight before Nebraska answered. By halftime, the score was 49–14. This game marked the first time Pelini went up against Bob Stoops whom he formerly worked under as defensive coordinator for the Sooners in 2004. This game also marks the most points ever scored against Nebraska in a single quarter.

On November 8, Bo Pelini's Nebraska Cornhuskers won against the Kansas Jayhawks, making them bowl eligible. The 9–4 season was capped by a 26–21 victory over the Clemson Tigers at the 2009 Gator Bowl, played only days after Pelini returned from his father's funeral service in Ohio.

Pelini's 2008 regular season record of 9–4 was the highest among all 28 Division I FBS teams with new head coaches and staffs that year. This performance was rewarded in March 2009 when his salary was increased from $1.1 to $1.8 million. Pelini's contract ran until February 2014.

==== 2009 season ====
Expectations were high heading into the 2009 season for the Cornhuskers. Despite having to replace record-setting quarterback Joe Ganz, and the entire receiving corps, Nebraska was expected to contend in the wide open Big 12 North Division. The Cornhuskers were ranked in the preseason at #24 by the AP, the first pre-season ranking since the 2007 season. Nebraska was expecting big seasons from running back Roy Helu and defensive tackle Ndamukong Suh. Before the season even started, Pelini had to kick his second leading rusher, Quentin Castille off the team. Castille's absence led to the emergence of true freshman running back Rex Burkhead during fall camp.

Pelini led his team to the 2009 Big 12 Championship Game against the #3 Texas Longhorns. Texas, led by quarterback Colt McCoy, was heavily favored over the Huskers, who were ranked number 21. Despite the loss in the game, the Big 12 Championship Game showcased the skill of Ndamukong Suh. The All-American had 4.5 sacks to go along with 12 tackles, 7 of them coming behind the line of scrimmage. With his performance Suh was invited to the 2009 Heisman Trophy ceremony, where he finished 4th. Suh flourished under coach Pelini, finishing the 2009 season with 85 tackles, 12 sacks, 24 tackles for a loss, 10 passes broken up, 3 blocked kicks, one interception, and a forced fumble. Suh won almost every major post season award available to a defensive lineman, including the Lombardi Award, Outland Trophy, Chuck Bednarik Award, Bronko Nagurski Trophy, and The Bill Willis Trophy. Suh is the second Outland and Lombardi winner of Pelini's, following Glenn Dorsey.

Nebraska finished the season with a 33–0 win over the Arizona Wildcats in the 2009 Holiday Bowl where Pelini proclaimed to the Nebraska fans in the Holiday Bowl stands "Nebraska is back and we're here to stay!". The victory was the first bowl shutout of Nebraska's 45 bowl history, as well as the first shutout in Holiday Bowl history. Nebraska's final rank in the coaches and AP media poll was 14th, the highest final ranking since 2001. Under Pelini Nebraska finished #1 in NCAA scoring and pass efficiency defense, the first time since 1984 and 2003 that Nebraska has led the country in those categories respectively.

==== 2010 season ====
Following a mixed 2009 finish (notably the Big 12 Championship Game loss and the Holiday Bowl victory), Bo's Cornhuskers began the season ranked #8 in the pre-season AP poll. Nebraska was expected by several sports analysts to compete for the Big 12 title before departing to the Big Ten Conference in 2011. Following disappointing losses to both the Texas Longhorns and Texas A&M Aggies, the Cornhuskers dropped to #15 in the AP poll going into the final week of the regular season thereby eliminating any realistic hopes of a national championship in 2010. Nebraska proceeded to beat the Colorado Buffaloes in the final regular game of the season, clinching the Big 12 North title. In the 2010 Big 12 Championship Game, Nebraska committed four turnovers and blew a 17–0 second quarter lead on the way to a 23–20 defeat to Big 12 South Co-Champion Oklahoma. In the final BCS ratings for the season, Nebraska finished 18th and in fifth place amongst Big 12 teams behind Oklahoma, Missouri, Oklahoma State, and Texas A&M. Nebraska lost the 2010 Holiday Bowl, 19–7, to the Washington Huskies. Three months prior, the Cornhuskers defeated the Huskies by 35 points in Seattle.

==== 2011 season ====
After a disappointing end to the 2010 season, Nebraska began 2011 with wins in its first four games against Chattanooga, Fresno State, Washington, and Wyoming. Nebraska was defeated by the Wisconsin Badgers in the Cornhuskers' first Big Ten Conference game. The Cornhuskers came out strong tying it up at 14–14 with four minutes to go in the 2nd quarter, but Wisconsin's offense dominated Nebraska in the 2nd half and ending up winning the game with a score of 48–17. Nebraska rebounded by winning three games in a row, including a 21-point second half comeback – the largest in school history – against Ohio State and a 24–3 win versus #9 Michigan State. After that winning streak they were upset by the unranked Northwestern Wildcats where they suffered two fumbles inside the Northwestern 30 yard line. The next game for the Cornhuskers came against #12 Penn State. The week leading up to the game had much of the national focus revolving the firing of coach Joe Paterno and the sexual assault charges in the Penn State sex abuse scandal. A prayer was held before the game for both teams by Nebraska running backs coach Ron Brown. The Cornhuskers won the game 17–14. January 2, 2012, Nebraska lost the 2012 Capital One Bowl to the South Carolina Gamecocks, 13–30.

==== 2012 season ====
The Cornhuskers began the 2012 season ranked #17 in the AP Poll. After a loss to the UCLA Bruins, Nebraska won their remaining regular season games with the exception of a 38–63 loss to eventual Big Ten Leaders Division champion Ohio State. The Cornhuskers' 7–1 conference record earned the team their first Big Ten Legends Division title, and first appearance to the 2012 Big Ten Football Championship Game. Due to postseason ineligibility of both Ohio State and Penn State, they played the third place team in the Leaders Division, Wisconsin. The Cornhuskers never led during the game and were defeated by a score of 31–70. In their second appearance in as many seasons, the Cornhuskers played in the 2013 Capital One Bowl and lost to Southeastern Conference East co-champions Georgia Bulldogs, 31–45.

==== 2013 season ====
The Cornhuskers began the 2013 season ranked #18 in the AP Poll. After a loss to the UCLA Bruins, Nebraska lost starting quarterback Taylor Martinez, the first of many injuries during the 2013 season. Nebraska would go on to lose to the Minnesota Golden Gophers, Michigan State Spartans and Iowa Hawkeyes to finish the regular season 8–4. Nebraska went on and defeated Georgia 24–19 in the Gator Bowl, avenging the previous year's bowl loss to the Bulldogs. Nebraska finished the 2013 season with a 9–4 record, Pelini's sixth straight season with nine or more wins. Nebraska also finished the season ranked #25 in the final Coaches Poll, but unranked in the final AP Poll.

==== 2014 spring game ====
Pelini embraced his alter ego Twitter account, Faux Pelini, during the Tunnel Walk for the 2014 Spring Game. Faux created a fake Christmas Card which prominently featured Pelini holding a cat. The real Pelini brought a cat with him to the Tunnel Walk and, with the crowd roaring, held the cat aloft like Simba.

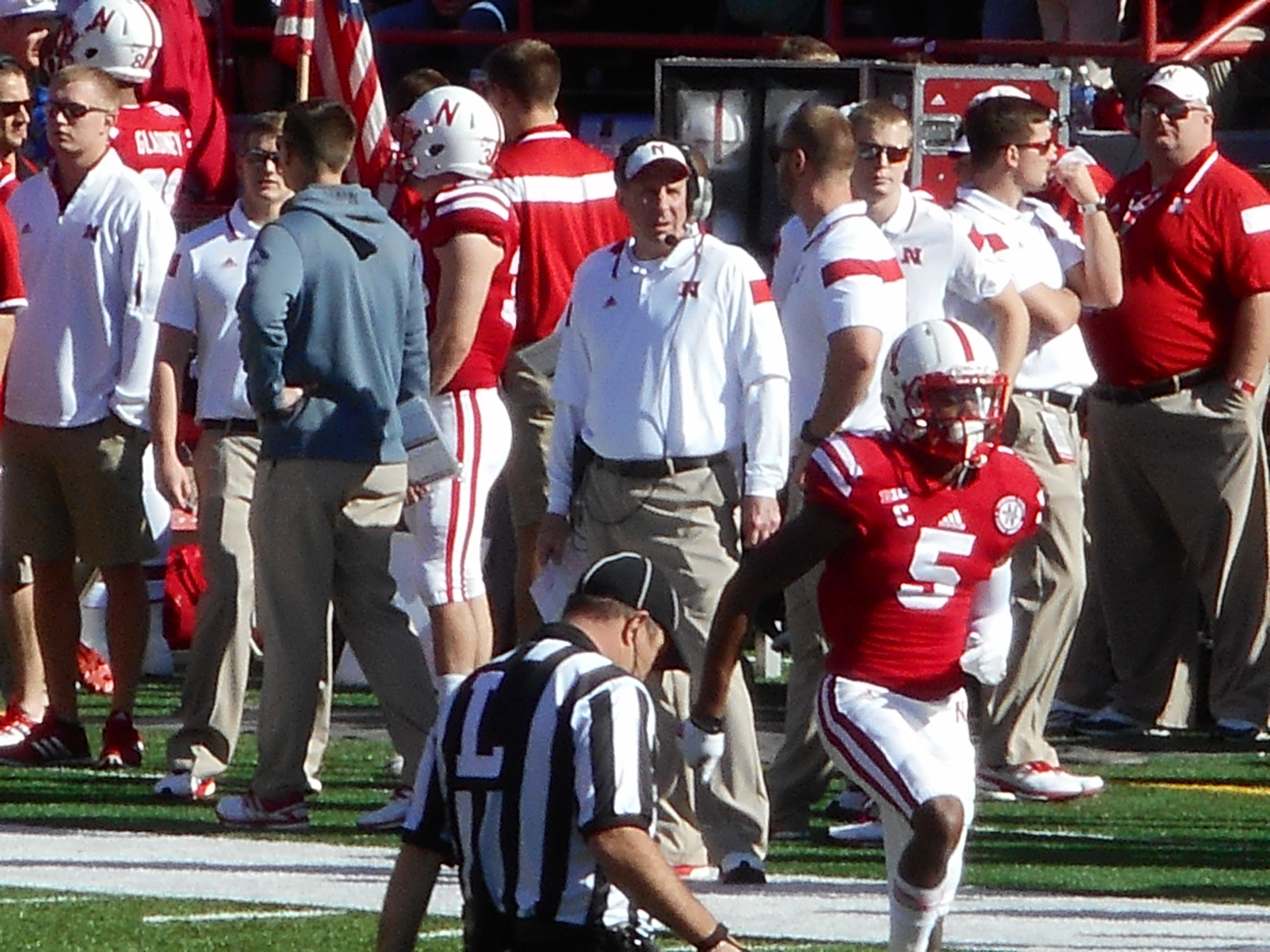
Bo Pelini along the sideline (Nebraska vs. Rutgers, 2014).

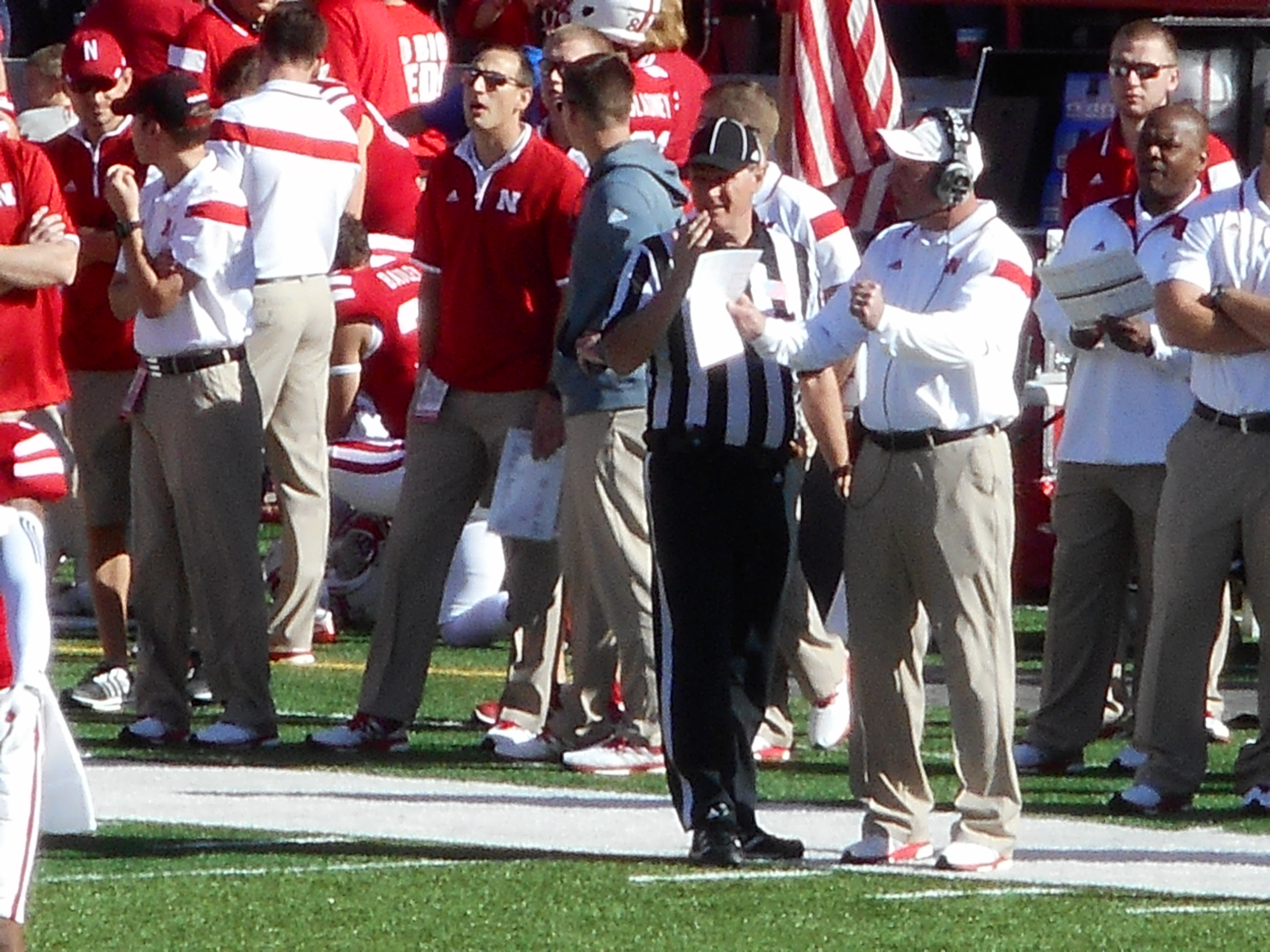
Bo Pelini talking to an official (Nebraska vs. Rutgers, 2014).

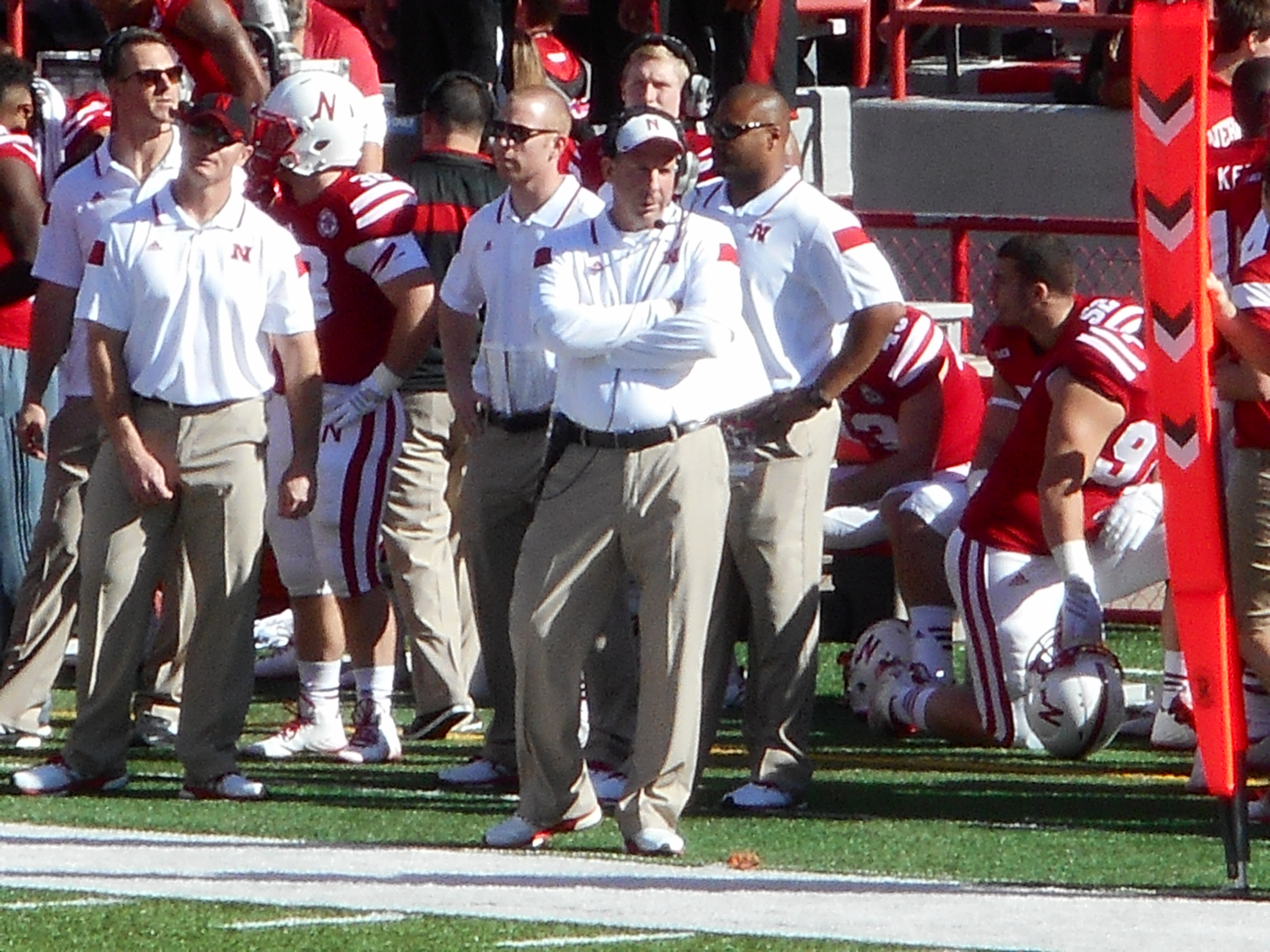
Bo Pelini with arms crossed (Nebraska vs. Rutgers, 2014).

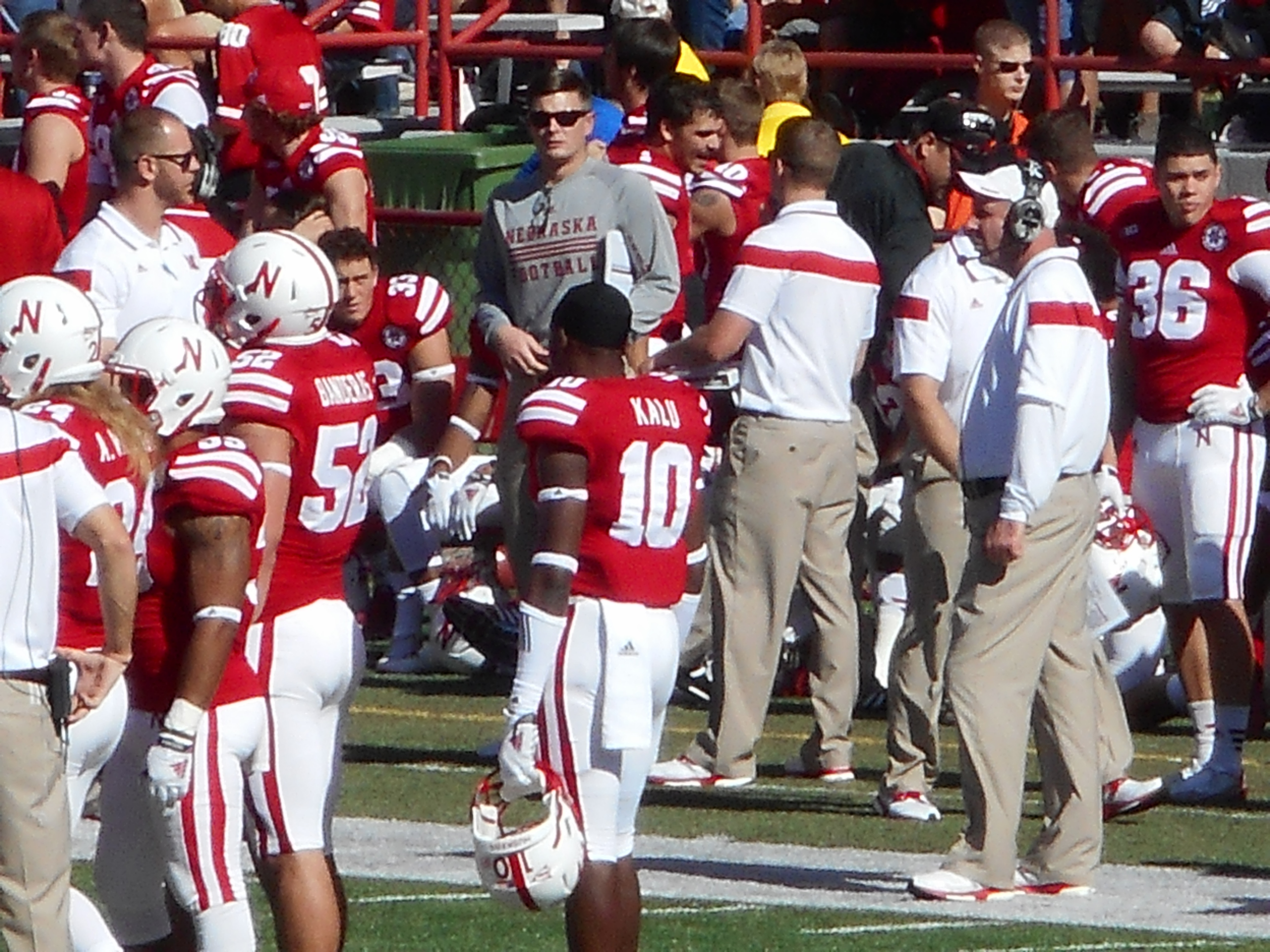
Bo Pelini with players during a timeout (Nebraska vs. Rutgers, 2014).

==== 2014 season ====
The Cornhuskers began the 2014 season ranked #22 in both the AP Poll and Coaches' polls. They finished tied for second in the Big Ten's West Division with a 9–3 record and ranked 25th in the nation.

==== Firing ====
On November 30, 2014, after the conclusion of the regular season, Pelini was fired by Nebraska director of athletics Shawn Eichorst, effective immediately. The university was contracted to pay Pelini $7.65 million in salary following his termination in the form of $150,000 monthly payments for the next 51 months. The total liquidation to be paid to Pelini is roughly $7.9 million.

Pelini left the NU football program with a 67–27 record, winning at least 9 games in every season. Despite this record, and winning several bowl games, Nebraska never won a conference title under Pelini. Eichorst stated at a press conference that Pelini hadn't won "the games that mattered the most" against top-tier opponents. Barney Cotton was announced as interim head coach, and prepared the team for its bowl game.

On December 17, the Omaha World-Herald obtained audio of Pelini attacking Eichorst in vulgar terms while addressing his players on December 2. Pelini questioned Eichorst's integrity, calling him "a fucking lawyer who makes policies", a "total pussy" and a "total cunt". In response, Nebraska claimed that Pelini had been fired in part for "a pattern of unprofessional, disrespectful behavior" toward players, fans and Nebraska employees.

=== Youngstown State ===
Pelini was hired by Youngstown State in December 2014 as their new head coach. The Penguins went 5–6 in 2015 but rebounded in 2016 to go 12–4, losing the FCS Championship game 28-14 to James Madison University. The next three seasons would see Pelini coach the Penguins to records of 6–5, 4–7 and 6–6.

Through his final season in 2019, Pelini posted an overall record of 33–28 with one playoff appearance in 2015 during his five-year tenure at Youngstown State.

In April 2021, the NCAA found Youngstown State worthy of probation for two years with recruiting sanctions, after several rules violations were found to be committed under Pelini's watch, most significantly allowing coaches who had not taken the coach certification test to recruit off campus.

=== LSU Tigers (DC) – Second tenure ===
On January 27, 2020, Pelini was named LSU's next defensive coordinator, replacing Dave Aranda. In his first game returning as defensive coordinator for LSU his defense gave up a one game SEC passing yard record against Mississippi State. However the next week against Vanderbilt, the defense only gave up a touchdown. The following week and in only his third game returning as LSU defensive coordinator his defense gave up 586 total yards and 45 points in a 45 to 41 loss to Missouri. In his first three games returning as the LSU defensive coordinator the LSU defense surrendered a school record 96 combined points. Pelini was dismissed from his position on December 21, 2020.

== Controversies ==
=== First audiotape leak ===
Following a home game loss to UCLA on September 14, 2013, and shortly after responding to criticism from former Nebraska football player Tommie Frazier about the loss, a two-year-old audio tape with a profane tirade by Pelini was anonymously leaked to Deadspin. The recording was made following Nebraska's come-from-behind win against Ohio State in 2011, when it was reported that almost all of the students and more than half of the stadium left when Nebraska was down at half time 27–6. The Huskers won 34–27, the biggest come back in school history. According to Deadspin, among the statements made on the audio recording, Pelini said:

Our crowd. What a bunch of fucking fair-weather fucking—they can all kiss my ass out the fucking door. 'Cause the day is fucking coming now. We'll see what they can do when I'm fucking gone. I'm so fucking pissed off.

Shortly after the tape was released, Pelini apologized:

I take full responsibility for these comments. They were spoken in a private room following the Ohio State game. I was venting following a series of emotional events which led to this moment. That being said, these comments are in no way indicative of my true feelings. I love it here in Nebraska and feel fortunate to be associated with such a great University and fan base. I again apologize to anyone whom I have offended.

Following the release of the audio tape University of Nebraska–Lincoln chancellor Harvey Perlman stated that the university would consider how to respond to the matter, and subsequently decided to move on from the incident. Tom Osborne, former coach and athletic director at Nebraska, then announced that he had heard the tape in 2012 (about a year earlier) and talked to Pelini about it but did not tell Perlman about it.

Some observers and members of the media believed that Pelini would have a difficult time winning back fan support. Pelini believed that he had built up enough "points" for at least partial forgiveness for his statements from the fans. He said he enjoyed his job at Nebraska, had had great support, and had turned down job offers from other schools. Sports media reactions to the audio tape ranged from calls for Pelini to be fired to the view that what Pelini said was nothing more than what other coaches have likely said in the past.

=== On-field conduct ===
Pelini's behavior was again called into question during Nebraska's nationally televised loss to the Iowa Hawkeyes at the end of the 2013 regular season. At halftime, the coach snapped at ESPN on ABC reporter Quint Kessenich when asked about a pair of Cornhusker turnovers, responding with "What kind of question is that?" Later, in disagreement with a call made on the field, Pelini swung his hat within inches of an official's face, drawing a 15-yard penalty for unsportsmanlike conduct. Pelini remained defiant in the post game press conference, referring to his personal foul call as "chicken shit" and declaring, "If they want to fire me, go ahead...I don't apologize for anything I have done." Pelini subsequently apologized for his behavior after the Iowa game.

During the November 14, 2015, game against the North Dakota State Bison in the 4th quarter, Pelini engaged the referees in several heated arguments for penalties they called including two unsportsmanlike conduct penalties on Pelini. He was reprimanded by the Missouri Valley Football Conference for his on field conduct.

=== Second audiotape leak ===
Following his firing on November 30, 2014, Pelini met with his (former) team at a local high school on December 2. Leaked audio of the meeting revealed that the coach verbally attacked University of Nebraska administration. At one point Pelini said:

It wasn't a surprise to me. It really wasn't. I didn't really have any relationship with the AD. The guy — you guys saw him (Sunday) — the guy's a total p----. I mean, he is. He's a total c---.

After the leak, the Nebraska administration released a statement, saying:

If these comments were, indeed, spoken by Mr. Pelini, we are extremely disappointed, but it only reaffirms the decision that he should no longer be a leader of young men at Nebraska. His habitual use of inappropriate language, and his personal and professional attacks on administrators, are antithetical to the values of our university. His behavior is consistent with a pattern of unprofessional, disrespectful behavior directed by Mr. Pelini toward the passionate fans of Nebraska, employees of the university and, most concerning, our student-athletes. This behavior is not tolerated at the University of Nebraska and, among many other concerns, played a role in his dismissal.

Youngstown State, who had already hired Pelini stated:

"Coach Pelini's remarks as reported are inappropriate and unfortunate. We have discussed the report with Coach. We are confident that Coach will conduct himself accordingly moving forward. We will not be commenting any further on this issue."

== Head coaching record ==
Year	Team	Overall	Conference	Standing	Bowl/playoffs	Coaches^{#}	AP^{°}
Nebraska Cornhuskers (Big 12 Conference) (2003)
2003	Nebraska	1–0 (Note: Pelini served as interim head coach for the 2003 Alamo Bowl following the firing of Frank Solich. Under Solich, Nebraska compiled a 9–3 record with a conference mark of 5–3, placing second in the Big 12 Conference North Division. Nebraska was ranked 22nd in the AP Poll and 21st in Coaches Poll prior to the bowl game.)			W Alamo	18	18
Nebraska Cornhuskers (Big 12 Conference) (2008–2010)
2008	Nebraska	9–4	5–3	T–1st (North)	W Gator		
2009	Nebraska	10–4	6–2	1st (North)	W Holiday	14	14
2010	Nebraska	10–4	6–2	T–1st (North)	L Holiday	19	20
Nebraska Cornhuskers (Big Ten Conference) (2011–2014)
2011	Nebraska	9–4	5–3	3rd (Legends)	L Capital One	24	24
2012	Nebraska	10–4	7–1	1st (Legends)	L Capital One	23	25
2013	Nebraska	9–4	5–3	T–2nd (Legends)	W Gator	25	
2014	Nebraska	9–3 (Note: Pelini was fired on November 30, 2014. Barney Cotton served as Nebraska's interim head coach for the 2014 Holiday Bowl.)	5–3	T–2nd (West)	Holiday	23	25
Nebraska:		67–27	39–17				
Youngstown State Penguins (Missouri Valley Football Conference) (2015–2019)
2015	Youngstown State	5–6	3–5	T–6th			
2016	Youngstown State	12–4	6–2	3rd	L NCAA Division I Championship	2	2
2017	Youngstown State	6–5	4–4	7th			
2018	Youngstown State	4–7	3–5	T–6th			
2019	Youngstown State	6–6	2–6	8th			
Youngstown State:		33–28	18–22				
Total:		100–55					
National championship Conference title Conference division title or championship game berth
^{†}Indicates Bowl Coalition, Bowl Alliance, BCS, or CFP / New Years' Six bowl.; ^{#}Rankings from final Coaches Poll.; ^{°}Rankings from final AP Poll.

== See also ==
- List of college football head coaches with non-consecutive tenure
