= Barney Cotton =

American football player and coach (born 1956)

Personal information
- Born: September 30, 1956 (age 70); Omaha, Nebraska, U.S.
- Listed height: 6 ft 5 in (1.96 m)

Career information
- High school: Omaha Burke
- College: Nebraska
- NFL draft: 1979: 3rd round, 59th overall pick

Career history

Playing
- Nebraska (1975–1978); Cincinnati Bengals (1979); St. Louis Cardinals (1980–1981)

Coaching
- St. Cloud State (1989–1994) Offensive coordinator & offensive line coach; Hastings (1995–1996) Head coach; New Mexico State (1997–2002) Assistant head coach, offensive coordinator, & offensive line coach; Nebraska (2003) Offensive coordinator & offensive line coach; Iowa State (2004–2006) Offensive coordinator & offensive line coach; Ames HS (IA) (2007) Assistant coach; Nebraska (2008–2012) Assistant head coach & offensive line coach; Nebraska (2013–2014) Assistant head coach, run game coordinator, offensive line coach, & tight ends coach; Nebraska (2014) Interim head coach; UNLV (2015–2018) Offensive coordinator & tight ends coach

Awards and highlights
- As player: Second-team All-Big Eight (1978); As coach: NIAC Coach of the Year (1995)

Head coaching record
- Postseason: 0–2
- Career: 13–7–1
- Stats at Pro Football Reference

Barney Thomas Cotton (born September 30, 1956) is an American football coach and former player.

== Biography ==
=== Early life ===
Cotton was born in Omaha, Nebraska and attended Omaha Burke High School.

=== Playing career ===
Cotton's college playing career began in 1975 at University of Nebraska–Lincoln after the conclusion of his high school career at Omaha Burke. He played his first two seasons as an offensive lineman, then spent the next season on the other side of the ball, playing defensive tackle. In his senior season, he returned to the offensive line, earning All-Big-Eight honors while helping Tom Osborne's 1978 team to a league championship.

Cotton was a third-round pick in the 1979 NFL draft and played for one season with the Cincinnati Bengals before moving to the St Louis Cardinals. In 1982, after three seasons with St. Louis, a knee injury forced his retirement. He returned to Nebraska, completing a bachelor's degree in 1983.

=== Coaching career ===
Cotton began his football coaching career in 1989 when he joined the staff at St. Cloud State University as the offensive coordinator and offensive line coach, helping St. Cloud State to a North Central Conference championship that same year. Cotton was also a student of St. Cloud State during his coaching career there, completing his master's degree in athletic administration during his last year as their coach in 1994.

In 1995, Cotton was appointed as head coach for the first time in his career, back in his home state of Nebraska, at Hastings College. In 1995, Hastings College won the Nebraska-Iowa Athletic Conference (NIAC) championship and made an appearance in the NAIA playoffs, and Cotton was named NIAC Coach of the Year.

In 1997, former Nebraska Cornhuskers player and New Mexico State University head coach Tony Samuel hired Cotton to the same position he had held at St. Cloud State, offensive coordinator and offensive line coach. Although championships eluded New Mexico State during Cotton's six years with the program, the production of his offensive players generated impressive statistics. New Mexico State ranked nationally in the top 25 in overall offense in 1998, 2000 and 2002, and was ranked nationally in the top 25 in rushing offense for all six years. In his final season, New Mexico State led the Sun Belt Conference in passing efficiency, rushing offense and total offense. Six New Mexico State linemen earned All-Sun Belt Conference honors during Cotton's tenure.

Cotton was hired by Nebraska head coach Frank Solich, once again to serve as offensive coordinator and offensive line coach, helping Nebraska finish with a 10–3 record in 2003. Despite helping Nebraska to a national top ten rushing offense and mentoring four linemen to earn All-Big 12 Conference honors, Cotton was let go along with nearly all of the other assistants after Solich was replaced by Bill Callahan following the 2003 season.

Iowa State University hired Cotton in 2004, once again as offensive coordinator and offensive line coach. In his first season, Iowa State overcame a soft start by finishing strong and defeating the Miami RedHawks in the 2004 Independence Bowl. Over the following two years, he guided several Iowa State players to Big 12 Conference honors before he found himself once again let go after another coaching change. Unable to find a college coaching job, he spent the following year remaining in Ames, Iowa, as an unpaid volunteer coaching assistant at Ames High School.

In 2008, Cotton again accepted a position with Nebraska. Former Nebraska defensive coordinator Bo Pelini, who had also been let go along with Cotton following Solich's dismissal, was named Callahan's successor as head coach at Nebraska. Cotton was one of several assistants who had previously been associated with Nebraska who were brought back to the program, and he accepted Pelini's offer to return as offensive line coach and also to take on the title of Assistant Head Coach, to draw upon his prior head coaching experience and assist Pelini with some of the administrative responsibilities of the head coaching position. He remained in this role until the end of the 2012 season, when tight ends coach and run game coordinator were added to his responsibilities.

On November 30, 2014, two days after the Cornhuskers defeated the Iowa Hawkeyes 37–34 to finish the regular season with a 9–3 record, Cotton was appointed interim head coach for the upcoming bowl game, following the dismissal of Pelini.

Cotton began serving as the UNLV offensive coordinator and tight ends coach starting in 2015.

Cotton resigned as offensive coordinator for UNLV, citing health reasons.

=== Children ===
Barney Cotton has three children (Ben, Sam, and Jake Cotton), all of whom have played football for Nebraska. Ben played at Nebraska as a tight end from 2008 to 2012, and was a pre-season member of the 2013 San Diego Chargers, but did not make fall roster. Jake played as an offensive lineman from 2010 to 2014, and signed pre-season free agent contracts the Houston Texans and the Ottawa Redblacks but did not make the final roster for either team. Sam played as a tight end from 2012 to 2016, and signed a free agent contract with the New England Patriots in 2017.

== Head coaching record ==
Year	Team	Overall	Conference	Standing	Bowl/playoffs
Hastings Broncos (Nebraska-Iowa Athletic Conference) (1995–1996)
1995	Hastings	7–2–1	5–1	1st	L NAIA Division II First Round
1996	Hastings	6–4	4–2	T–2nd	
Hastings:		13–6–1	9–3		
Nebraska Cornhuskers (Big Ten Conference) (2014)
2014	Nebraska	0–1^{‡}			L Holiday
Nebraska:		0–1	0–0		
Total:		13–7–1			
National championship Conference title Conference division title or championship game berth
^{‡} Coached bowl game as interim head coach
