= 2003 Alamo Bowl =

2003 MasterCard Alamo Bowl
Michigan State Spartans	Nebraska Cornhuskers
(8–4)	(9–3)
Big Ten	Big 12
3	17
Head coach: John L. Smith	Head coach: Bo Pelini
	AP / Coaches / BCS; 22 / 21 / 20
	1	2	3	4	Total
Michigan State	3	0	0	0	3
Nebraska	3	14	0	0	17
- Date: December 29, 2003
- Season: 2003
- Stadium: Alamodome
- Location: San Antonio, Texas
- Referee: Rich Kollen (Mtn. West)

United States TV coverage
- Network: ESPN
- Announcers: Mike Tirico, Lee Corso, Kirk Herbstreit and Jerry Punch

The 2003 Alamo Bowl was an American football bowl game between the Michigan State Spartans and the Nebraska Cornhuskers played December 29, 2003 at the Alamodome in San Antonio, Texas.

In a defensive game, Nebraska scored first, leading 3–0 on a 29-yard field goal kicked by David Dyches. Michigan State's Dave Rayner tied the score at 3 at the end of the 1st quarter, kicking a 46-yard field goal. In the second quarter, running back Cory Ross scored on touchdown runs of 2 and 6 yards, to give Nebraska a 17–3 lead.

There was no further scoring, and the game ended with Nebraska defeating Michigan State, 17–3.

== Statistics ==
Statistics	Michigan State	Nebraska
First downs	13	20
Rushes-Yards	18	229
Passing yards	156	160
Passes	39-21-3	17-8-0
Total yards	174	389
Return yards	3	30
Fumbles-Lost	0-0	1-0
Penalties-Yards	5-53	8-69
Punts-Average	8-46.4	7-42.9
Time of possession	29:31	30:29
