= 2012 South Carolina Gamecocks football team =

American college football season

2012 South Carolina Gamecocks football

Palmetto Bowl champion

Outback Bowl, W 33–28 vs. Michigan
- Conference: Southeastern Conference
- East Division

Ranking
- Coaches: No. 7
- AP: No. 8
- Record: 11–2 (6–2 SEC)
- Head coach: Steve Spurrier (8th season)
- Co-offensive coordinators: Steve Spurrier Jr. (1st season); Shawn Elliott (1st season)
- Offensive scheme: Fun and gun
- Defensive coordinator: Lorenzo Ward (1st season)
- Base defense: 4–2–5
- Home stadium: Williams-Brice Stadium

2012 Southeastern Conference football standings
	Conf.			Overall
Team	W		L	W		L
Eastern Division
No. T–5 Georgia xy	7	–	1	12	–	2
No. 9 Florida x%	7	–	1	11	–	2
No. 8 South Carolina	6	–	2	11	–	2
No. 23 Vanderbilt	5	–	3	9	–	4
Missouri	2	–	6	5	–	7
Tennessee	1	–	7	5	–	7
Kentucky	0	–	8	2	–	10
Western Division
No. 1 Alabama x$#	7	–	1	13	–	1
No. 14 LSU *	6	–	2	10	–	3
No. T–5 Texas A&M	6	–	2	11	–	2
Mississippi State	4	–	4	8	–	5
Ole Miss *	3	–	5	7	–	6
Arkansas	2	–	6	4	–	8
Auburn	0	–	8	3	–	9
Championship: Alabama 32, Georgia 28
# – BCS National Champion; $ – BCS representative as conference champion; % – BCS at-large representative; x – Division champion/co-champions; y – Championship game participant; * Ole Miss and LSU vacated all wins due to NCAA violations.; Rankings from AP Poll

The 2012 South Carolina Gamecocks football team represented the University of South Carolina in the 2012 NCAA Division I FBS football season. The Gamecocks were led by eighth-year head coach Steve Spurrier and played their home games at Williams–Brice Stadium. They were a member of the East Division of the Southeastern Conference. The season finished with 11–2, 6–2 in SEC to finish in third place in the East Division.

South Carolina started the season 6–0, capped off by a blowout win over No. 5 Georgia at home. By this point, the Gamecocks were on a school-record ten-game winning streak dating back to last season and were subsequently ranked No. 3 in the country. This was the program's highest ranking since 1984, and the 2012 Gamecocks began receiving comparisons to that 1984 team, which started 9–0 and came close to winning a national championship. This ten-game winning streak and No. 3 ranking in 2012 has not been matched or surpassed by the program since. Back-to-back losses on the road to top-10 opponents (No. 9 LSU and No. 3 Florida) sent South Carolina plummeting in the rankings and out of national championship contention. The Gamecocks rebounded, winning the rest of their games in the regular season, including against archrival No. 12 Clemson. They were invited to the Outback Bowl, where the Gamecocks defeated No. 19 Michigan 33–28 by a game-winning touchdown with eleven seconds remaining in the game. South Carolina finished the season with eleven wins and ranked in the top ten for only the second time in school history.

Sophomore defensive end Jadeveon Clowney emerged as the best defensive player in college football. Clowney had thirteen sacks and 23.5 tackles for loss, both school records. He won the Ted Hendricks Award and finished sixth in Heisman Trophy voting. Clowney was a unanimous All-American, only the second in program history. He won the ESPY Award for best play of the sporting year for his Outback Bowl tackle on Michigan running back Vincent Smith, since regarded as one of the greatest plays in college football history.

== Preseason ==
On April 14, 2012, the Black squad defeated the Garnet squad, 38–24, in the annual Garnet & Black Spring Game, in front of a crowd of 34,513. Quarterback Connor Shaw finished the day 6–7 for 128 yards and two touchdowns for the Black team, while Garnet QB Dylan Thompson was 15–20 for 168 yards and a rushing touchdown.

== Schedule ==
The October 6 game against Georgia played host to ESPN's College GameDay, the school's sixth time hosting the popular ESPN show.

Date	Time	Opponent	Rank	Site	TV	Result	Attendance
August 30	7:00 pm	at Vanderbilt	No. 9	Vanderbilt Stadium; Nashville, TN	ESPN	W 17–13	38,393
September 8	12:21 pm	East Carolina*	No. 9	Williams-Brice Stadium; Columbia, SC	SECN	W 48–10	77,006
September 15	7:00 pm	UAB*	No. 8	Williams-Brice Stadium; Columbia, SC	SECRN	W 49–6	77,963
September 22	3:30 pm	Missouri	No. 7	Williams-Brice Stadium; Columbia, SC	CBS	W 31–10	80,836
September 29	7:00 pm	at Kentucky	No. 6	Commonwealth Stadium; Lexington, KY	ESPN2	W 38–17	49,810
October 6	7:00 pm	No. 5 Georgia	No. 6	Williams-Brice Stadium; Columbia, SC (rivalry) (College GameDay)	ESPN	W 35–7	85,199‡
October 13	8:00 pm	at No. 9 LSU	No. 3	Tiger Stadium; Baton Rouge, LA	ESPN	L 21–23 ‡	92,734
October 20	3:30 pm	at No. 3 Florida	No. 9	Ben Hill Griffin Stadium; Gainesville, FL (College GameDay)	CBS	L 11–44	90,833
October 27	12:00 pm	Tennessee	No. 17	Williams-Brice Stadium; Columbia, SC (rivalry)	ESPN	W 38–35	80,250
November 10	12:00 pm	Arkansas	No. 12	Williams-Brice Stadium; Columbia, SC	CBS	W 38–20	78,772
November 17	1:00 pm	Wofford*	No. 12	Williams-Brice Stadium; Columbia, SC	PPV	W 24–7	79,982
November 24	7:00 pm	at No. 12 Clemson*	No. 13	Memorial Stadium; Clemson, SC (Palmetto Bowl)	ESPN	W 27–17	84,513
January 1	1:00 pm	vs. No. 19 Michigan*	No. 11	Raymond James Stadium; Tampa, FL (Outback Bowl)	ESPN	W 33–28	54,527
*Non-conference game; Rankings from AP Poll; All times are in Eastern time

- ‡ New Williams–Brice Stadium Attendance Record

‡ As part of their penalty for NCAA violations, LSU has retroactively vacated its 2012 victory over South Carolina. However, the penalty to vacate victories does not result in a loss (or forfeiture) of the affected game or award a victory to the opponent, therefore South Carolina still considers the game a loss in their official records.

== Game summaries ==
=== Vanderbilt ===
Team	1	2	3	4	Total
• #9 South Carolina	7	3	0	7	17
Vanderbilt	0	10	3	0	13

- Date: August 30
- Location: Nashville, Tennessee
- Game start: 6:01 pm
- Elapsed time: 3:15
- Game attendance: 38,393
- Game weather: 86, Partly Cloudy
- Referee: Matt Austin
- TV announcers (ESPN): Rece Davis (play-by-play), David Pollack and Jesse Palmer (color), Samantha Steele (sideline)

=== East Carolina ===
Team	1	2	3	4	Total
East Carolina	0	0	3	7	10
• #9 South Carolina	14	7	14	13	48

- Date: September 8
- Location: Columbia, South Carolina
- Game start: 12:21 pm
- Elapsed time: 3:19
- Game attendance: 77,006
- Game weather: 88, Sunny
- Referee: Wayne Winkler
- TV announcers (SEC Network): Dave Neal (play-by-play), Andre Ware (color), Cara Capuano (sideline)

=== UAB ===
Team	1	2	3	4	Total
UAB	3	3	0	0	6
• #8 South Carolina	7	14	14	14	49

- Date: September 15
- Location: Columbia, South Carolina
- Game start: 7:08 pm
- Elapsed time: 3:22
- Game attendance: 77,963
- Game weather: 84, Fair
- Referee: Ken Williamson
- Television network: FSN

=== Missouri ===
Team	1	2	3	4	Total
Missouri	0	3	0	7	10
• #7 South Carolina	0	21	7	3	31

- Date: September 22
- Location: Columbia, South Carolina
- Game start: 3:39 pm
- Elapsed time: 3:02
- Game attendance: 80,836
- Game weather: 88, Fair
- Referee: Matt Loeffler
- TV announcers (CBS): Verne Lundquist (play-by-play), Gary Danielson (color), Tracy Wolfson (sideline)

=== Kentucky ===
Team	1	2	3	4	Total
• #6 South Carolina	0	7	14	17	38
Kentucky	3	14	0	0	17

- Date: September 29
- Location: Lexington, Kentucky
- Game start: 7:10 pm
- Elapsed time: 3:08
- Game attendance: 49,810
- Game weather: 70, Fair
- Referee: Tom Ritter
- TV announcers (ESPN2): Mike Patrick (play-by-play), Ed Cunningham (color), Jeannine Edwards (sideline)

=== Georgia ===
Team	1	2	3	4	Total
#5 Georgia	0	0	0	7	7
• #6 South Carolina	21	0	7	7	35

- Date: October 6
- Location: Columbia, South Carolina
- Game start: 7:10 pm
- Elapsed time: 3:13
- Game attendance: 85,199
- Game weather: 78, Clear
- Referee: Matt Austin
- TV announcers (ESPN): Brent Musburger (play-by-play), Kirk Herbstreit (color), Heather Cox (sideline)

=== LSU ===
Team	1	2	3	4	Total
#3 South Carolina	0	7	7	7	21
• #9 LSU	3	0	7	13	23

- Date: October 13
- Location: Baton Rouge, Louisiana
- Game start: 7:06 pm
- Elapsed time: 3:27
- Game attendance: 92,734
- Game weather: 79 Degrees
- Referee: Hubert Owens
- TV announcers (ESPN): Brent Musburger (play-by-play), Kirk Herbstreit (color), Heather Cox (sideline)

=== Florida ===
Team	1	2	3	4	Total
#9 South Carolina	3	3	2	3	11
• #3 Florida	7	14	16	7	44

- Date: October 20
- Location: Gainesville, Florida
- Game start: 3:39 pm
- Elapsed time: 3:22
- Game attendance: 90,833
- Game weather: 79, Sunny
- Referee: Matt Loeffler
- TV announcers (CBS): Verne Lundquist (play-by-play), Gary Danielson (color), Tracy Wolfson (sideline)

=== Tennessee ===
Team	1	2	3	4	Total
Tennessee	7	7	7	14	35
• #17 South Carolina	7	21	7	3	38

- Date: October 27
- Location: Columbia, South Carolina
- Game start: 12:01 pm
- Elapsed time: 3:34
- Game attendance: 80,250
- TV announcers (ESPN): Dave Pasch (play-by-play), Brian Griese (color), Jenn Brown (sideline)

=== Arkansas ===
Team	1	2	3	4	Total
Arkansas	0	10	3	7	20
• #12 South Carolina	7	14	17	0	38

- Date: November 10
- Location: Columbia, South Carolina
- Game start: 12:10 pm
- Elapsed time: 3:26
- Game attendance: 78,772
- TV announcers (CBS): Tim Brando (play-by-play), Steve Beuerlein (color), Marty Snider (sideline)

=== Wofford ===
Team	1	2	3	4	Total
Wofford	0	7	0	0	7
• #12 South Carolina	0	7	0	17	24

- Date: November 17
- Location: Columbia, South Carolina
- Game start: 1:05 pm
- Elapsed time: 2:44
- Game attendance: 79,982
- Television network: PPV

=== at No. 11 Clemson (rivalry) ===
Game Twelve– No. 12 South Carolina Gamecocks (9-2) at No. 11 Clemson Tigers (10-1) – Game summary

Quarter	1	2	3	4	Total
No. 12 South Carolina	7	3	10	7	27
No. 11 Clemson	14	0	3	0	17

at Memorial Stadium • Clemson, South Carolina

- Date: Saturday, November 24, 2012
- Game time: 7:00 p.m. EST
- Game weather: Temperature: • Wind: • Weather: Clear
- Game attendance: 82,000
- TV: ESPN

Game information

First quarter

- (5:27) CLEM – Tajh Boyd 3-yard run (Chandler Catanzaro kick) (Drive: 16 plays, 85 yards, 6:14; Clemson 7-0)
- (1:46) SC – Bruce Ellington 13-yard pass from Dylan Thompson (Adam Yates kick) (Drive: 7 plays, 63 yards, 3:41; Tied 7-7)
- (1:22) CLEM – DeAndre Hopkins 43-yard pass from Tajh Boyd (Chandler Catanzaro kick) (Drive: 2 plays, 75 yards, 0:24; Clemson 14-7)

Second quarter

- (2:40) SC – Adam Yates 27-yard field goal (Drive: 12 plays, 79 yards, 6:14; Clemson 14-10)

Third quarter

- (11:48) SC – Ace Sanders 34-yard pass from Dylan Thompson (Adam Yates kick) (Drive: 10 plays, 85 yards, 3:12; South Carolina 17-14)
- (6:56) SC – Adam Yates 43-yard field goal (Drive: 8 plays, 42 yards, 3:08; South Carolina 20-14)
- (5:07) CLEM – Chandler Catanzaro 37-yard field goal (Drive: 6 plays, 56 yards, 1:49; South Carolina 20-17)

Fourth quarter

- (4:17) SC – Bruce Ellington 6-yard pass from Dylan Thompson (Adam Yates kick) (Drive: 13 plays, 65 yards, 7:39; South Carolina 27-17)

Statistics	SC	CLEM
First downs	26	18
Total yards	86–444	59–328
Rushing yards	45–134	35–145
Passing yards	310	183
Passing: Comp–Att–Int	23–41–1	11–24–2
Time of possession	39:34	20:02

Team	Category	Player	Statistics
South Carolina	Passing	Dylan Thompson	23/41, 310 yards, 3 TD, INT
South Carolina	Rushing	Kenny Miles	16 carries, 45 yards
South Carolina	Receiving	Ace Sanders	6 receptions, 119 yards, TD
Clemson	Passing	Tajh Boyd	11/24, 183 yards, TD, 2 INT
Clemson	Rushing	Andre Ellington	15 carries, 72 yards
Clemson	Receiving	Jaron Brown	3 receptions, 68 yards

=== Michigan ===
Team	1	2	3	4	Total
• #11 South Carolina	14	7	0	12	33
#19 Michigan	3	10	9	6	28

- Date: January 1, 2013
- Location: Tampa, Florida
- Game start: 1:00 pm
- Elapsed time: 3:45
- Game attendance: 54,527
- Referee: Jeff Maconaghy (Big East)
- TV announcers (ESPN): Mike Tirico (play-by-play), Jon Gruden (color), Shannon Spake (sideline)

== Players ==
=== Depth chart ===
Projected starters and primary backups versus Clemson on November 24, 2012.

Defense

FS
D. J. Swearinger
Kadetrix Marcus

WLB	MLB	SLB
⋅	Reginald Bowens	⋅
Quin Smith	Damario Jeffery	⋅

SS
Brison Williams
Jared Shaw

CB
Victor Hampton
Ahmad Christian

DE	DT	DT	DE
Devin Taylor	Kelcy Quarles	Byron Jerideau	Jadeveon Clowney
Aldrick Fordham	J.T. Surratt	Gerald Dixon, Jr.	Chaz Sutton

CB
Akeem Auguste
Jimmy Legree

Offense

WR
Ace Sanders
Nick Jones

LT	LG	C	RG	RT
Corey Robinson	A. J. Cann	T.J. Johnson	Ronald Patrick	Brandon Shell
Brandon Shell	Will Sport	Kyle Harris	Kaleb Broome	Cody Gibson

TE
Justice Cunningham
Rory Anderson

WR
Bruce Ellington
Damiere Byrd

QB
Connor Shaw
Dylan Thompson

Key reserves
RB Mike Davis
WR D.L. Moore
WR DeAngelo Smith
WR Shaq Roland
WR K.J. Brent
TE Jerell Adams
DE Gerald Dixon
LB Cedrick Cooper

RB
Kenny Miles
Mike Davis

FB
Qua Gilchrist
Connor McLaurin

Special teams
PK Adam Yates
P Tyler Hull
KR Bruce Ellington
PR Ace Sanders
LS Walker Inabinet
H Seth Strickland

=== Awards ===
- Jadeveon Clowney – SEC Defensive Lineman of the Week, 9/17/12; SEC Defensive Lineman of the Week, 10/1/12; SEC Defensive Lineman and Co-Defensive Player of the Week, 11/26/12
- T.J. Johnson - SEC Offensive Lineman of the Week, 10/8/12
- Marcus Lattimore – SEC Offensive Player of the Week, 9/3/12
- Ace Sanders - SEC Co-Special Teams Player of the Week, 9/24/12, SEC Co-Special Teams Player of the Week, 10/8/12
- Connor Shaw - SEC Co-Offensive Player of the Week, 9/24/12, SEC Offensive Player of the Week, 10/29/12
- D. J. Swearinger - Walter Camp National Defensive Player of the Week, 11/11/12

== Rankings ==
Ranking movements Legend: ██ Increase in ranking ██ Decrease in ranking
	Week															
Poll	Pre	1	2	3	4	5	6	7	8	9	10	11	12	13	14	Final
AP	9	9	8	7	6	6	3	9	17	11	12	12	13	11	11	8
Coaches	9	9	9	8	6	6	3	8	16	11	11	11	12	10	10	7
Harris	Not released						3	7	16	11	11	11	12	10	10	Not released
BCS	Not released							7	13	8	8	9	12	10	10	Not released

== Coaching staff ==
- Steve Spurrier – Head coach
- Lorenzo Ward – Defensive coordinator
- Kirk Botkin - Linebackers, spurs coach
- Grady Brown - Secondary coach, assistant special teams coordinator
- Shawn Elliott – Co-offensive coordinator, offensive line coach
- Brad Lawing – Defensive line coach
- G. A. Mangus – Quarterbacks coach
- Joe Robinson - Special teams coordinator, tight ends coach
- Everette Sands - Running backs coach
- Steve Spurrier Jr. – Recruiting coordinator, wide receivers coach
