= 2012 Southeastern Conference football season =

- League: NCAA Division I FBS
- Sport: football
- Duration: August 30, 2012 through January 7, 2013
- Teams: 14
- TV partner(s): ESPN, ESPNU, ESPN2, CBS, and SEC Network

2013 NFL Draft
- Top draft pick: Luke Joeckel (Texas A&M)
- Picked by: Jacksonville Jaguars, 2nd overall

Regular season
- East champions: Georgia
- East runners-up: Florida
- West champions: Alabama
- West runners-up: LSU, Texas A&M

SEC Championship Game
- Champions: Alabama
- Runners-up: Georgia

Football seasons
- 2011 2013

2012 Southeastern Conference football standings
	Conf.			Overall
Team	W		L	W		L
Eastern Division
No. T–5 Georgia xy	7	–	1	12	–	2
No. 9 Florida x%	7	–	1	11	–	2
No. 8 South Carolina	6	–	2	11	–	2
No. 23 Vanderbilt	5	–	3	9	–	4
Missouri	2	–	6	5	–	7
Tennessee	1	–	7	5	–	7
Kentucky	0	–	8	2	–	10
Western Division
No. 1 Alabama x$#	7	–	1	13	–	1
No. 14 LSU *	6	–	2	10	–	3
No. T–5 Texas A&M	6	–	2	11	–	2
Mississippi State	4	–	4	8	–	5
Ole Miss *	3	–	5	7	–	6
Arkansas	2	–	6	4	–	8
Auburn	0	–	8	3	–	9
Championship: Alabama 32, Georgia 28
# – BCS National Champion; $ – BCS representative as conference champion; % – BCS at-large representative; x – Division champion/co-champions; y – Championship game participant; * Ole Miss and LSU vacated all wins due to NCAA violations.; Rankings from AP Poll

The 2012 Southeastern Conference football season began on August 30 with South Carolina visiting Vanderbilt, and concluded with the BCS National Championship Game on January 7, 2013. It was also the first season of play for former Big 12 Conference members Texas A&M and Missouri. Texas A&M plays in the West Division, while Missouri plays in the East Division, although geographically, Missouri is one of the conference's westernmost teams.

== Preseason ==
Arkansas head coach Bobby Petrino was fired in early April for lying about his affair with an Arkansas employee after a motorcycle accident that he had on April 1st that left him with four broken ribs, a cracked vertebra in his neck and numerous abrasions on his face. In the press conference announcing the termination, Arkansas Athletic Director Jeff Long said, "(Petrino) made the decision to mislead the public, (and it) adversely affected the university and the football program." In Petrino's place, Assistant Coach Taver Johnson served as interim coach through the end of spring practice. After the firing of Bobby Petrino in April 2012, there was considerable media speculation that Smith would return to Arkansas. This was confirmed on April 23 when multiple media outlets reported that Smith had indeed agreed to succeed Petrino. He was introduced as Arkansas' 29th full-time head coach the next day. Smith signed a 10-month contract, leading to speculation that he was only taking the post on an interim basis for the 2012 season. The Razorbacks' formal announcement described him as "head coach", without any qualifiers; however, it also indicated that Smith's hiring would allow Arkansas to hire "a head coach for the future of the program" in a more appropriate timeframe following the 2012 season.

At the end of the 2011 season it was announced that Head Coach Houston Nutt resigned from the position of head coach at Ole Miss. His resignation became official once the season ended. In his place, Ole Miss hired Arkansas State Head Coach Hugh Freeze.

=== Preseason All-SEC ===
2012 Pre-season Coaches All-SEC

First team offense
Position	Player	Class	Team
QB	Tyler Wilson	Sr.	Arkansas
RB	Marcus Lattimore	Jr.	South Carolina
RB	Knile Davis	Jr.	Arkansas
WR	Da'Rick Rogers	Jr.	Tennessee
WR	Cobi Hamilton	Sr.	Arkansas
WR	Ryan Swope	Sr.	Texas A&M
TE	Philip Lutzenkirchen	Sr.	Auburn
OL	Alex Hurst	Sr.	LSU
OL	D. J. Fluker	Sr.	Alabama
OL	Luke Joeckel	Jr.	Texas A&M
OL	Larry Warford	Sr.	Kentucky
C	Barrett Jones	Sr.	Alabama

First team defense
Position	Player	Class	Team
DL	Jadeveon Clowney	So.	South Carolina
DL	Sam Montgomery	Jr.	LSU
DL	Corey Lemonier	Jr.	Auburn
DL	Barkevious Mingo	Jr.	LSU
LB	Sean Porter	Sr.	Texas A&M
LB	C. J. Mosley	So.	Alabama
LB	Jarvis Jones	Sr.	Georgia
DB	Johnthan Banks	Sr.	Mississippi State
DB	Bacarri Rambo	Sr.	Georgia
DB	Eric Reid	Jr.	LSU
DB	Tyrann Mathieu	Jr.	LSU

First Team Special Teams
Position	Player	Class	Team
K	Caleb Sturgis	Sr.	Florida
P	Brad Wing	So.	LSU
RS	Tyrann Mathieu	Jr.	LSU
All-purpose back	Dennis Johnson	Jr.	Arkansas

== Rankings ==
Legend
	Increase in ranking
	Decrease in ranking
	Not ranked previous week
RV	Received votes

		(Pre)	Sept. 3	Sept. 10	Sept. 17	Sept. 24	Oct. 1	Oct. 8	Oct. 15	Oct. 22	Oct. 29	Nov. 5	Nov. 12	Nov. 19	Nov. 26	Dec. 3	Final
Alabama	AP	2	1	1	1	1	1	1	1	1	1	1	4	2	2	2	1
Alabama	C	2	1	1	1	1	1	1	1	1	1	1	5	2	2	2	1
Alabama	BCS	Not released							1	1	1	1	4	2	2	2	
Arkansas	AP	10	8	RV	NR												
Arkansas	C	10	9	21	NR												
Arkansas	BCS	Not released															
Auburn	AP	RV	RV	NR													
Auburn	C	25	RV	NR													
Auburn	BCS	Not released															
Florida	AP	23	24	18	14	11	10	4	3	3	8	7	7	6	5	4	9
Florida	C	23	23	17	14	12	11	6	4	3	8	7	7	6	5	4	10
Florida	BCS	Not released							2	2	7	6	6	4	4	3	
Georgia	AP	6	7	7	5	5	5	14	13	12	7	5	5	3	3	6	5
Georgia	C	6	7	7	6	5	5	12	12	11	6	5	4	3	3	5	4
Georgia	BCS	Not released							11	10	6	5	5	3	3	7	
Kentucky	AP																
Kentucky	C																
Kentucky	BCS	Not released															
LSU	AP	3	3	3	2	3	4	9	6	6	5	9	8	8	9	9	14
LSU	C	1	3	2	2	3	3	8	6	6	5	9	8	7	6	7	12
LSU	BCS	Not released							6	6	5	7	7	7	7	8	
Mississippi State	AP	RV	RV	RV	23	21	20	19	15	13	17	22	RV	25	RV	NR	
Mississippi State	C	RV	RV	RV	23	19	19	18	16	12	15	23	RV	24	RV	RV	NR
Mississippi State	BCS	Not released							12	11	18	21	NR				
Missouri	AP	RV	RV	NR	RV	NR											
Missouri	C	RV	RV	NR													
Missouri	BCS	Not released															
Ole Miss	AP																
Ole Miss	C			RV	NR						RV	NR					
Ole Miss	BCS	Not released															
South Carolina	AP	9	9	8	7	6	6	3	9	17	11	12	12	13	11	11	8
South Carolina	C	9	9	9	8	6	6	3	8	16	8	11	11	12	10	10	7
South Carolina	BCS	Not released							7	13	11	8	9	12	10	10	
Tennessee	AP	RV	RV	23	RV	RV	RV	RV	NR								
Tennessee	C	RV	RV	RV	RV	RV	NR										
Tennessee	BCS	Not released															
Texas A&M	AP	RV	RV	NR	RV	RV	RV	22	20	22	16	15	9	9	10	10	5
Texas A&M	C	RV	RV	RV	RV	RV	RV	21	19	21	16	14	10	10	8	9	5
Texas A&M	BCS	Not released							18	20	16	15	8	9	9	9	
Vanderbilt	AP													RV	RV	RV	23
Vanderbilt	C		RV	NR										RV	RV	RV	20
Vanderbilt	BCS	Not released															

== Regular season ==
Index to colors and formatting
Non-conference matchup; SEC member won
Non-conference matchup; SEC member lost
Conference matchup

All times Eastern time. SEC teams in bold.

Rankings reflect that of the AP poll for that week until week eight when the BCS rankings will be used.

=== Week One ===
Date	Time	Visiting team	Home team	Site	Broadcast	Result	Attendance	Reference
August 30	4:00 p.m.	#9 **South Carolina**	**Vanderbilt**	Vanderbilt Stadium • Nashville, Tennessee	ESPN	**SCAR** 17–13	38,393	
August 31	4:30 p.m.	North Carolina State	**Tennessee**	Georgia Dome • Atlanta (Chick-fil-A Kickoff Game)	ESPNU	**W** 21–35	55,529	
September 1	9:00 a.m.	Buffalo	#6 **Georgia**	Sanford Stadium • Athens, Georgia	SEC Network	**W** 23–45	92,446	
September 1	12:30 p.m.	Bowling Green	#23 **Florida**	Ben Hill Griffin Stadium • Gainesville, Florida	ESPN	**W** 14–27	84,704	
September 1	4:00 p.m.	Jacksonville State	# 10 **Arkansas**	Donald W. Reynolds Razorback Stadium • Fayetteville, Arkansas	PPV	**W** 24-49	71,062	
September 1	4:00 p.m.	#14 Clemson	**Auburn**	Georgia Dome • Atlanta (Chick-fil-A Kickoff Game)	ESPN	**L** 26–19	75,211	
September 1	4:00 p.m.	North Texas	#3 **LSU**	Tiger Stadium • Baton Rouge, Louisiana	ESPNU	**W** 14-41	92,059	
September 1	4:00 p.m.	Jackson State	**Mississippi State**	Davis Wade Stadium • Starkville, Mississippi	FSN	**W** 9–56	55,082	
September 1	4:00 p.m.	Southeastern Louisiana	**Missouri**	Faurot Field • Columbia, Missouri	PPV	**W** 10–62	62,173	
September 1	4:00 p.m.	Central Arkansas	**Ole Miss**	Vaught–Hemingway Stadium • Oxford, Mississippi	CSS	**W** 27–49	50,544	
September 1	5:00 p.m.	#8 Michigan	#2 **Alabama**	Cowboys Stadium • Arlington, Texas	ABC	**W** 14–41	90,413	
September 2	12:30 p.m.	**Kentucky**	#25 Louisville	Papa John's Cardinal Stadium • Louisville, Kentucky	ESPN	**L** 14–32	55,386	

Texas A&M's matchup with Louisiana Tech University was rescheduled to October 13 by agreement of the schools due to the potential impact of Hurricane Isaac on Shreveport, Louisiana, where the game was to be held.

Players of the week:

Offensive		Defensive		Special teams	
Player	Team	Player	Team	Player	Team

=== Week Two ===
Date	Time	Visiting team	Home team	Site	Broadcast	Result	Attendance	Reference
September 8	9:00 a.m.	**Auburn**	**Mississippi State**	Davis Wade Stadium • Starkville, Mississippi	ESPN	**MSU** 10–28	56,111	
September 8	9:21 a.m.	East Carolina	**South Carolina**	Williams-Brice Stadium • Columbia, South Carolina	SEC Network	**W** 10–48	77,006	
September 8	12:30 p.m.	#24 **Florida**	**Texas A&M**	Kyle Field • College Station, Texas	ESPN	**UF** 20–17	87,114	
September 8	12:30 p.m.	Western Kentucky	**Alabama**	Bryant–Denny Stadium • Tuscaloosa, Alabama	SEC Network	**W** 0–35	101,821	
September 8	1:00 p.m.	Georgia State	**Tennessee**	Neyland Stadium • Knoxville, Tennessee	PPV	**W** 13–51	87,821	
September 8	4:00 p.m.	Washington	#3 **LSU**	Tiger Stadium • Baton Rouge, Louisiana	ESPN	**W** 3–41	92,804	
September 8	4:00 p.m.	UTEP	**Ole Miss**	Vaught–Hemingway Stadium • Oxford, Mississippi	FSN	**W** 10–28	53,133	
September 8	4:00 p.m.	Louisiana–Monroe	#8 **Arkansas**	War Memorial Stadium • Little Rock, Arkansas	ESPNU	**L** 34–31 OT	53,089	
September 8	4:30 p.m.	Kent State	**Kentucky**	Commonwealth Stadium • Lexington, Kentucky	CSS	**W** 14–47	48,346	
September 8	4:45 p.m.	#7 **Georgia**	**Missouri**	Faurot Field • Columbia, Missouri	ESPN2	**UGA** 41–20	71,004	
September 8	5:00 p.m.	**Vanderbilt**	Northwestern	Ryan Field • Evanston, Illinois	Big Ten Network	**L** 13–23	31,644	

Players of the week:

Offensive		Defensive		Special teams	
Player	Team	Player	Team	Player	Team

=== Week Three ===
Date	Time	Visiting team	Home team	Site	Broadcast	Result	Attendance	Reference
September 15	9:21 a.m.	Louisiana–Monroe	**Auburn**	Jordan–Hare Stadium • Auburn, Alabama	SEC Network	**W** 28–31 OT	85,214	
September 15	9:30 a.m.	Presbyterian	**Vanderbilt**	Vanderbilt Stadium • Vanderbilt, Tennessee	CSS	**W** 0–58	35,491	
September 15	12:30 p.m.	#1 **Alabama**	**Arkansas**	Donald W. Reynolds Razorback Stadium • Fayetteville, Arkansas	CBS	**ALA** 52–0	74,617	
September 15	12:30 p.m.	**Texas A&M**	SMU	Gerald J. Ford Stadium • University Park, Texas	FSN	**W** 48–3	32,016	
September 15	3:00 p.m.	#18 **Florida**	#23 **Tennessee**	Neyland Stadium • Knoxville, Tennessee	ESPN	**UF** 37–20	102,455	
September 15	4:00 p.m.	Western Kentucky	**Kentucky**	Commonwealth Stadium • Lexington, Kentucky	ESPNU	**L** 32–31 OT	53,980	
September 15	4:00 p.m.	Arizona State	**Missouri**	Faurot Field • Columbia, Missouri	ESPN2	**W** 20–24	71,004	
September 15	4:00 p.m.	UAB	#8 **South Carolina**	Williams-Brice Stadium • Columbia, South Carolina	FSN	**W** 6–49	77,963	
September 15	4:00 p.m.	**Mississippi State**	Troy	Veterans Memorial Stadium • Troy, Alabama	ESPN3	**W** 30–24	29,013	
September 15	4:30 p.m.	Florida Atlantic	#7 **Georgia**	Sanford Stadium • Athens, Georgia	CSS	**W** 20–56	92,746	
September 15	5:00 p.m.	Idaho	#3 **LSU**	Tiger Stadium • Baton Rouge, Louisiana	PPV	**W** 14–63	92,177	
September 15	6:26 p.m.	#14 Texas	**Ole Miss**	Vaught–Hemingway Stadium • Oxford, Mississippi	ESPN	**L** 66–31	61,797	

Players of the week:

Offensive		Defensive		Special teams	
Player	Team	Player	Team	Player	Team

=== Week Four ===
Date	Time	Visiting team	Home team	Site	Broadcast	Result	Attendance	Reference
September 22	9:00 am	**Ole Miss**	Tulane	Mercedes-Benz Superdome • New Orleans	FSN	**W** 39–0	28,913	
September 22	9:00 a.m.	**Kentucky**	#14 **Florida**	Ben Hill Griffin Stadium • Gainesville, Florida	SEC Network	**UF** 0–38	87,102	
September 22	2:00 p.m.	Florida Atlantic	#1 **Alabama**	Bryant–Denny Stadium • Tuscaloosa, Alabama	PPV	**W** 7–40	101,821	
September 22	2:30 pm	**Missouri**	#7 **South Carolina**	Williams-Brice Stadium • Columbia, South Carolina	CBS	**SCAR** 10–31	80,836	
September 22	4:00 pm	#2 **LSU**	**Auburn**	Jordan–Hare Stadium • Auburn, Alabama	ESPN	**LSU** 12–10	86,721	
September 22	4:00 pm	Rutgers	**Arkansas**	Donald W. Reynolds Razorback Stadium • Fayetteville, Arkansas	ESPNU	**L** 35-26	72,543	
September 22	4:00 pm	South Carolina State	**Texas A&M**	Kyle Field • College Station, Texas	FSN	**W** 14–70	86,775	
September 22	4:00 pm	South Alabama	#23 **Mississippi State**	Davis Wade Stadium • Starkville, Mississippi	PPV	**W** 10–30	55,186	
September 22	4:30 pm	Akron	**Tennessee**	Neyland Stadium • Knoxville, Tennessee	CSS	**W** 26–47	81,719	
September 22	4:45 pm	**Vanderbilt**	#5 **Georgia**	Sanford Stadium • Athens, Georgia	ESPN2	**UGA** 3–48	92,746	

Players of the week:

Offensive		Defensive		Special teams	
Player	Team	Player	Team	Player	Team

=== Week Five ===
Date	Time	Visiting team	Home team	Site	Broadcast	Result	Attendance	Reference
September 29	12:00 pm	**Missouri**	UCF	Bright House Networks Stadium • Orlando, Florida	FSN	**W** 21–16	35,835	
September 29	12:21 pm	**Arkansas**	**Texas A&M**	Kyle Field • College Station, Texas	SEC Network	**TAMU** 58–10	86,442	
September 29	3:30 pm	**Tennessee**	#5 **Georgia**	Sanford Stadium • Athens, Georgia	CBS	**UGA** 51–44	92,746	
September 29	7:00 pm	#6 **South Carolina**	**Kentucky**	Commonwealth Stadium • Lexington, Kentucky	ESPN2	**SCAR** 38–17	49,810	
September 29	8:00 pm	Towson	#3 **LSU**	Tiger Stadium • Baton Rouge, Louisiana	ESPNU	**W** 38–22	92,154	
September 29	9:15 pm	**Ole Miss**	#1 **Alabama**	Bryant–Denny Stadium • Tuscaloosa, Alabama	ESPN	**ALA** 33–14	101,821	

Week off: Auburn, Florida, Mississippi State, Vanderbilt.

Players of the week:

Offensive		Defensive		Special teams	
Player	Team	Player	Team	Player	Team

=== Week Six ===
Date	Time	Visiting team	Home team	Site	Broadcast	Result	Attendance	Reference
October 6	12:00 pm	**Arkansas**	**Auburn**	Jordan–Hare Stadium • Auburn, Alabama	ESPN2	**ARK** 24–7	85,813	
October 6	12:21 pm	#20 **Mississippi State**	**Kentucky**	Commonwealth Stadium • Lexington, Kentucky	SEC Network	**MSU** 27–14	49,498	
October 6	3:30 pm	#4 **LSU**	#10 **Florida**	Ben Hill Griffin Stadium • Gainesville, Florida	CBS	**UF** 14–6	90,824	
October 6	7:00 pm	**Vanderbilt**	**Missouri**	Faurot Field • Columbia, Missouri	ESPN3	**Vandy** 19–15	66,250	
October 6	7:00 pm	**Texas A&M**	**Ole Miss**	Vaught–Hemingway Stadium • Oxford, Mississippi	ESPNU	**TAMU** 30–27	55,343	
October 6	7:00 pm	#5 **Georgia**	#6 **South Carolina**	Williams-Brice Stadium • Columbia, South Carolina	ESPN	**SCAR** 35–7	85,199	

Week off: Alabama, Tennessee.

Players of the week:

Offensive		Defensive		Special teams	
Player	Team	Player	Team	Player	Team

=== Week Seven ===
Date	Time	Visiting team	Home team	Site	Broadcast	Result	Attendance	Reference
October 13	12:21 pm	**Auburn**	**Ole Miss**	Vaught–Hemingway Stadium • Oxford, Mississippi	SEC Network	**Miss** 41–20	57,068	
October 13	3:30 pm	#1 **Alabama**	**Missouri**	Faurot Field • Columbia, Missouri	CBS	**ALA** 42–10	71,004	
October 13	6:00 pm	#4 **Florida**	**Vanderbilt**	Vanderbilt Stadium • Nashville, Tennessee	ESPNU	**UF** 31–17	40,350	
October 13	7:00 pm	**Kentucky**	**Arkansas**	Donald W. Reynolds Razorback Stadium • Fayetteville, Arkansas	ESPN3	**ARK** 49–7	67,153	
October 13	8:00 pm	#3 **South Carolina**	#9 **LSU**	Tiger Stadium • Baton Rouge, Louisiana	ESPN	**LSU** 23–21	92,734	
October 13	9:00 pm	**Tennessee**	#19 **Mississippi State**	Davis Wade Stadium • Starkville, Mississippi	ESPN2	**MSU** 41–31	57,831	
October 13	9:15 pm	#22 **Texas A&M**	#23 Louisiana Tech	Independence Stadium • Shreveport, Louisiana	ESPNU	**W** 59–57	40,453	

Week off: Georgia

Players of the week:

Offensive		Defensive		Special teams	
Player	Team	Player	Team	Player	Team

=== Week Eight ===
Date	Time	Visiting team	Home team	Site	Broadcast	Result	Attendance	Reference
October 20	12:00 pm	#6 **LSU**	#18 **Texas A&M**	Kyle Field • College Station, Texas	ESPN	**LSU** 24–19	87,429	
October 20	12:21 pm	**Auburn**	**Vanderbilt**	Vanderbilt Stadium • Nashville, Tennessee	SEC Network	**Vandy** 17–13	40,350	
October 20	3:30 pm	#7 **South Carolina**	#2 **Florida**	Ben Hill Griffin Stadium • Gainesville, Florida	CBS	**UF** 44–11	90,833	
October 20	7:00 pm	#1 **Alabama**	**Tennessee**	Neyland Stadium • Knoxville, Tennessee	ESPN	**ALA** 44–13	102,455	
October 20	7:00 pm	#11 **Georgia**	**Kentucky**	Commonwealth Stadium • Lexington, Kentucky	ESPN3	**UGA** 29–24	54,553	
October 20	7:00 pm	Middle Tennessee	#12 **Mississippi State**	Davis Wade Stadium • Starkville, Mississippi	ESPN2	**W** 45–3	55,108	

Week off: Arkansas, Ole Miss, Missouri.

Players of the week:

Offensive		Defensive		Special teams	
Player	Team	Player	Team	Player	Team

=== Week Nine ===
Date	Time	Visiting team	Home team	Site	Broadcast	Result	Attendance	Reference
October 27	12:00 pm	**Kentucky**	**Missouri**	Faurot Field • Columbia, Missouri	ESPNU	**Mizzou** 33–10	67,853	
October 27	12:00 pm	**Tennessee**	#13 **South Carolina**	Williams-Brice Stadium • Columbia, South Carolina	ESPN	**SCAR** 38–35	80,250	
October 27	12:21 pm	**Ole Miss**	**Arkansas**	War Memorial Stadium • Little Rock, Arkansas	SEC Network	**Miss** 30–27	55,378	
October 27	3:30 pm	#2 **Florida**	#11 **Georgia**	EverBank Field • Jacksonville, Florida	CBS	**UGA** 17–9	84,644	
October 27	7:00 pm	#20 **Texas A&M**	**Auburn**	Jordan–Hare Stadium • Auburn, Alabama	ESPNU	**TAMU** 63–21	85,119	
October 27	7:00 pm	Massachusetts	**Vanderbilt**	Vanderbilt Stadium • Vanderbilt, Tennessee	ESPN3	**W** 49–7	32,227	
October 27	8:30 pm	#11 **Mississippi State**	#1 **Alabama**	Bryant–Denny Stadium • Tuscaloosa, Alabama	ESPN	**ALA** 38–7	101,821	

Week off: LSU.

Players of the week:

Offensive		Defensive		Special teams	
Player	Team	Player	Team	Player	Team

=== Week Ten ===
Date	Time	Visiting team	Home team	Site	Broadcast	Result	Attendance	Reference
November 3	12:00 pm	**Missouri**	#7 **Florida**	Ben Hill Griffin Stadium • Gainesville, Florida	ESPN2	**UF** 14–7	90,496	
November 3	12:00 pm	**Vanderbilt**	**Kentucky**	Commonwealth Stadium • Lexington, Kentucky	ESPNU	**Vandy** 40–0	44,902	
November 3	12:00 pm	#16 **Texas A&M**	#15 **Mississippi State**	Davis Wade Stadium • Starkville, Mississippi	ESPN	**TAMU** 38–13	55,240	
November 3	12:00 pm	Troy	**Tennessee**	Neyland Stadium • Knoxville, Tennessee	ESPN3	**W** 55–48	84,189	
November 3	12:21 pm	Tulsa	**Arkansas**	Donald W. Reynolds Razorback Stadium • Fayetteville, Arkansas	SEC Network	**W** 19–15	64,451	
November 3	12:30 pm	New Mexico State	**Auburn**	Jordan–Hare Stadium • Auburn, Alabama	ESPN3	**W** 42–7	74,676	
November 3	3:30 pm	**Ole Miss**	#6 **Georgia**	Sanford Stadium • Athens, Georgia	CBS	**UGA** 37–10	92,746	
November 3	8:00 pm	#1 **Alabama**	#5 **LSU**	Tiger Stadium • Baton Rouge, Louisiana	CBS	**ALA** 21–17	93,374	

Week off: South Carolina.

Players of the week:

Offensive		Defensive		Special teams	
Player	Team	Player	Team	Player	Team

=== Week Eleven ===
Date	Time	Visiting team	Home team	Site	Broadcast	Result	Attendance	Reference
November 10	12:00 pm	**Arkansas**	#8 **South Carolina**	Williams-Brice Stadium • Columbia, South Carolina	CBS	**SCAR** 38–20	78,772	
November 10	12:21 pm	Louisiana-Lafayette	#6 **Florida**	Ben Hill Griffin Stadium • Gainesville, Florida	SEC Network	**W** 27–20	86,482	
November 10	12:21 pm	**Missouri**	**Tennessee**	Neyland Stadium • Knoxville, Tennessee	SEC Network	**Mizzou** 51–48 OT	89,272	
November 10	3:30 pm	#15 **Texas A&M**	#1 **Alabama**	Bryant–Denny Stadium • Tuscaloosa, Alabama	CBS	**TAMU** 29–24	101,821	
November 10	7:00 pm	#5 **Georgia**	**Auburn**	Jordan–Hare Stadium • Auburn, Alabama	ESPN2	**UGA** 38–0	86,146	
November 10	7:00 pm	#21 **Mississippi State**	#7 **LSU**	Tiger Stadium • Baton Rouge, Louisiana	ESPN	**LSU** 37–17	92,831	
November 10	7:00 pm	**Vanderbilt**	**Ole Miss**	Vaught–Hemingway Stadium • Oxford, Mississippi	ESPNU	**Vandy** 27–26	60,572	

Week off: Kentucky.

Players of the week:

Offensive		Defensive		Special teams	
Player	Team	Player	Team	Player	Team

=== Week Twelve ===
Date	Time	Visiting team	Home team	Site	Broadcast	Result	Attendance	Reference
November 17	12:21 pm	Western Carolina	#4 **Alabama**	Bryant–Denny Stadium • Tuscaloosa, Alabama	SEC Network	**W** 49–0	101,126	
November 17	12:21 pm	**Arkansas**	**Mississippi State**	Davis Wade Stadium • Starkville, Mississippi	SEC Network	**MSU** 45–14	54,838	
November 17	1:00 pm	Jacksonville State	#6 **Florida**	Ben Hill Griffin Stadium • Gainesville, Florida	ESPN3	**W** 23–0	82,691	
November 17	1:00 pm	Wofford	#9 **South Carolina**	Williams-Brice Stadium • Columbia, South Carolina	ESPN3	**W** 24–7	79,982	
November 17	1:30 pm	Georgia Southern	#5 **Georgia**	Sanford Stadium • Athens, Georgia	ESPN3	**W** 24–7	92,746	
November 17	2:00 pm	Alabama A&M	**Auburn**	Jordan–Hare Stadium • Auburn, Alabama	ESPN3	**W** 51–7	74,832	
November 17	3:30 pm	**Ole Miss**	#7 **LSU**	Tiger Stadium • Baton Rouge, Louisiana	CBS	**LSU** 41–35	92,872	
November 17	3:30 pm	Sam Houston State	#8 **Texas A&M**	Kyle Field • College Station, Texas	ESPN3	**W** 47–28	87,101	
November 17	7:00 pm	Syracuse	**Missouri**	Faurot Field • Columbia, Missouri	ESPNU	**L** 27–31	63,045	
November 17	7:00 pm	**Tennessee**	**Vanderbilt**	Vanderbilt Stadium • Nashville, Tennessee	ESPN2	**Vandy** 41–18	40,350	
November 17	7:30 pm	Samford	**Kentucky**	Commonwealth Stadium • Lexington, Kentucky	ESPN3	**W** 34–3	46,749	

Players of the week:

Offensive		Defensive		Special teams	
Player	Team	Player	Team	Player	Team

=== Week Thirteen ===
Date	Time	Visiting team	Home team	Site	Broadcast	Result	Attendance	Reference
November 23	2:30 pm	#7 **LSU**	**Arkansas**	Donald W. Reynolds Razorback Stadium • Fayetteville, Arkansas (Battle for the Golden Boot)	CBS	**LSU** 20–13	71,117	
November 24	12:00 pm	Georgia Tech	#3 **Georgia**	Sanford Stadium • Athens, Georgia (Clean, Old-Fashioned Hate)	ESPN	**W** 42–10	92,746	
November 24	12:21 pm	**Kentucky**	**Tennessee**	Neyland Stadium • Knoxville, Tennessee (Battle for the Barrel)	SEC Network	**Tenn** 37–17	81,841	
November 24	3:30 pm	#4 **Florida**	#10 Florida State	Doak Campbell Stadium • Tallahassee, Florida (Florida Cup)	ABC	**W** 37–26	83,429	
November 24	3:30 pm	**Vanderbilt**	Wake Forest	BB&T Field • Winston-Salem, North Carolina	ESPNU	**W** 55–21	26,134	
November 24	3:30 pm	**Auburn**	#2 **Alabama**	Bryant–Denny Stadium • Tuscaloosa, Alabama (Iron Bowl)	CBS	**ALA** 49–0	101,821	
November 24	7:00 pm	**Mississippi State**	**Ole Miss**	Vaught–Hemingway Stadium • Oxford, Mississippi (Egg Bowl)	ESPNU	**Miss** 41–24	61,005	
November 24	7:00 pm	#12 **South Carolina**	#11 Clemson	Memorial Stadium • Clemson, South Carolina (Battle of the Palmetto State)	ESPN	**W** 27–17	82,000	
November 24	7:00 pm	**Missouri**	#9 **Texas A&M**	Kyle Field • College Station, Texas	ESPN2	**TAMU** 59–29	87,222	

Players of the week:

Offensive		Defensive		Special teams	
Player	Team	Player	Team	Player	Team

=== Week Fourteen/SEC Championship ===
Date	Time	Visiting team	Home team	Site	Broadcast	Result	Attendance	Reference
December 1	4:00 pm	#2 **Alabama**	#3 **Georgia**	Georgia Dome • Atlanta, Georgia (2012 SEC Championship Game)	CBS	**ALA** 32–28	75,624	

== SEC vs AQ-conference matchups ==
Rankings from the AP Poll

Date	Visitor	Home	Significance	Score
August 31	NC State	**Tennessee**	Chick-fil-A Kickoff Game	**W** 35–21
September 1	#14 Clemson	**Auburn**	Chick-fil-A Kickoff Game	**L** 19–26
September 1	#8 Michigan	#2 **Alabama**	Cowboys Classic	**W** 41–14
September 2	**Kentucky**	#25 Louisville	Governor's Cup	**L** 14–32
September 8	Washington	#3 **LSU**		**W** 41–3
September 8	**Vanderbilt**	Northwestern		**L** 13–23
September 15	Arizona State	**Missouri**		**W** 24–20
September 15	#14 Texas	**Ole Miss**		**L** 31–66
September 22	Rutgers	**Arkansas**		**L** 26–35
November 17	Syracuse	**Missouri**		**L** 27–31
November 24	#13 **South Carolina**	#12 Clemson	Battle of the Palmetto State	**W** 27–17
November 24	#6 **Florida**	#10 Florida State	Florida-Florida State	**W** 37–26
November 24	Georgia Tech	#3 **Georgia**	Clean, Old-Fashioned Hate	**W** 42–10
November 24	**Vanderbilt**	Wake Forest		**W** 55–21

=== Bowl games ===
Nine SEC teams became bowl eligible, and all were selected for post-season competition. SEC teams are bolded.

Bowl Game	Date	Stadium	City	Television	Time (EST)	Team	Score	Team	Score
Franklin American Mortgage Music City Bowl	December 31	LP Field	Nashville, Tennessee	ESPN	12:05 p.m.	**Vanderbilt**	**38**	NC State	24
Chick-fil-A Bowl	December 31	Georgia Dome	Atlanta	ESPN	7:30 p.m.	#14 Clemson	**25**	#8 **LSU**	24
TaxSlayer.com Gator Bowl	January 1	EverBank Field	Jacksonville, Florida	ESPN2	12:00 p.m.	**Mississippi State**	20	#20 Northwestern	**34**
Capital One Bowl	January 1	Citrus Bowl	Orlando, Florida	ABC	1:00 p.m.	#7 **Georgia**	**45**	#16 Nebraska	31
Outback Bowl	January 1	Raymond James Stadium	Tampa, Florida	ESPN	1:00 p.m.	#10 **South Carolina**	**33**	#18 Michigan	28
Allstate Sugar Bowl	January 2	Mercedes-Benz Superdome	New Orleans	ESPN	8:30 p.m.	#21 Louisville	**33**	#3 **Florida**	23
Cotton Bowl Classic	January 4	Cowboys Stadium	Arlington, Texas	FOX	7:00 p.m.	#10 **Texas A&M**	**41**	#12 Oklahoma	13
BBVA Compass Bowl	January 5	Legion Field	Birmingham, Alabama	ESPN	1:00 p.m.	Pittsburgh	17	**Ole Miss**	**38**
Discover BCS National Championship	January 7	Sun Life Stadium	Miami Gardens, Florida	ESPN	8:30 p.m.	#1 Notre Dame	14	#2 **Alabama**	**42**

== Awards and honors ==
=== National awards ===
- Heisman Trophy: Johnny Manziel, Texas A&M
- Archie Griffin Award (MVP): Johnny Manziel, Texas A&M
- AP Player of the Year: Johnny Manziel, Texas A&M
- Chic Harley Award (Player of the Year): Johnny Manziel, Texas A&M
- SN Player of the Year: Johnny Manziel, Texas A&M
- Campbell Trophy ("academic Heisman"): Barrett Jones, Alabama
- Davey O'Brien Award (quarterback): Johnny Manziel, Texas A&M
- Manning Award (quarterback): Johnny Manziel, Texas A&M
- Dave Rimington Trophy (center): Barrett Jones, Alabama
- Outland Trophy (interior lineman): Luke Joeckel, Texas A&M
- Jack Lambert Trophy (linebacker): Jarvis Jones, Georgia
- Ted Hendricks Award (defensive end): Jadeveon Clowney, South Carolina
- Jim Thorpe Award (defensive back): Johnthan Banks, Mississippi State

=== Consensus All-Americans ===
- QB – Johnny Manziel, Texas A&M -- CONSENSUS -- (AP, FWAA, TSN, WCFF, CBS, ESPN, Scout, SI)
- OL – Luke Joeckel, Texas A&M -- UNANIMOUS -- (AFCA, AP, FWAA, TSN, WCFF, CBS, ESPN, PFW, Scout, SI)
- OL – Barrett Jones, Alabama -- CONSENSUS -- (AP, FWAA, TSN, WCFF, CBS, ESPN, Scout, SI)
- OL – Chance Warmack, Alabama -- UNANIMOUS -- (AFCA, AP, FWAA, TSN, WCFF, CBS, ESPN, PFW, Scout, SI)
- DL – Jadeveon Clowney, South Carolina -- UNANIMOUS -- (AFCA, AP, FWAA, TSN, WCFF, CBS, ESPN, PFW, Scout, SI)
- DL – Damontre Moore, Texas A&M -- CONSENSUS -- (AFCA, FWAA, WCFF, ESPN)
- LB – Jarvis Jones, Georgia -- UNANIMOUS -- (AFCA, AP, FWAA, TSN, WCFF, CBS, ESPN, PFW, Scout, SI)
- LB – C. J. Mosley, Alabama -- CONSENSUS -- (AFCA, AP, TSN, WCFF, CBS, Scout, SI)
- DB – Dee Milliner, Alabama -- UNANIMOUS -- (AFCA, AP, FWAA, TSN, WCFF, CBS, ESPN, PFW, Scout)
- DB – Eric Reid, LSU -- CONSENSUS -- (AFCA, FWAA, ESPN, Scout)

=== All-SEC Teams ===
The Southeastern Conference coaches voted for the All-SEC teams after the regular season concluded. Prior to the 2012 SEC Championship Game the teams were released. Alabama had the most representatives on the 2012 All-SEC Coaches’ Football Team, the league office announced on Tuesday. Alabama had eight total members, including six on the first team. Florida was close behind with seven, while Eastern Division Champion Georgia and Tennessee had six each.

Ten of the 14 SEC schools had a member on the first-team All-SEC squad. Alabama led with six, while Florida had five and Texas A&M with four. LSU, South Carolina and Texas A&M had five total members on the annual list, while Mississippi State was next with four total selections.

Coaches were not permitted to vote for their own players.

Position	1st Team		2nd Team	
Position	Player	School	Player	School
QB	Johnny Manziel	Texas A&M	A. J. McCarron	Alabama
RB	Mike Gillislee	Florida	Todd Gurley	Georgia
RB	Eddie Lacy	Alabama	Zac Stacy	Vanderbilt
WR	Cobi Hamilton	Arkansas	Ryan Swope	Texas A&M
WR	Jordan Matthews	Vanderbilt	Justin Hunter	Tennessee
TE	Mychal Rivera	Tennessee	Jordan Reed	Florida
C	Barrett Jones	Alabama	T. J. Johnson	South Carolina
OG	Chance Warmack	Alabama	Larry Warford	Kentucky
OG	D. J. Fluker	Alabama	Chris Burnette	Georgia
OT	Luke Joeckel	Texas A&M	Gabe Jackson	Mississippi State
OT	Jake Matthews	Texas A&M	Dallas Thomas	Tennessee
AP	Cordarrelle Patterson	Tennessee	Ace Sanders	South Carolina
DL	Jadeveon Clowney	South Carolina	Barkevious Mingo	LSU
DL	Sam Montgomery	LSU	Sheldon Richardson	Missouri
DL	Damontre Moore	Texas A&M	John Jenkins	Georgia
DL	Sharrif Floyd	Florida	Corey Lemonier	Auburn
LB	Jarvis Jones	Georgia	A. J. Johnson	Tennessee
LB	C. J. Mosley	Alabama	Jon Bostic	Florida
LB	Kevin Minter	LSU	Alec Ogletree	Georgia
DB	Dee Milliner	Alabama	D. J. Swearinger	South Carolina
DB	Matt Elam	Florida	Bacarri Rambo	Georgia
DB	Eric Reid	LSU	Robert Lester	Alabama
DB	Johnthan Banks	Mississippi State	Darius Slay	Mississippi State
PK	Caleb Sturgis	Florida	Drew Alleman	LSU
P	Kyle Christy	Florida	Dylan Breeding	Arkansas

== NFL draft ==
Rnd.	Pick	Team	Player	Pos.	College	Notes
1	2	Jacksonville Jaguars	Luke Joeckel	T	Texas A&M	
1	6	Cleveland Browns	Barkevious Mingo	DE	LSU	
1	9	New York Jets	Dee Milliner	CB	Alabama	
1	10	Tennessee Titans	Chance Warmack	G	Alabama	
1	11	San Diego Chargers	D. J. Fluker	T	Alabama	
1	13	New York Jets	Sheldon Richardson	DT	Missouri	
1	17	Pittsburgh Steelers	Jarvis Jones	LB	Georgia	
1	18	San Francisco 49ers	Eric Reid	S	LSU	
1	23	Minnesota Vikings	Sharrif Floyd	DT	Florida	
1	29	Minnesota Vikings	Cordarrelle Patterson	WR	Tennessee	
1	30	St. Louis Rams	Alec Ogletree	LB	Georgia	
1	32	Baltimore Ravens	Matt Elam	S	Florida	
2	34	Tennessee Titans	Justin Hunter	WR	Tennessee	
2	36	Detroit Lions	Darius Slay	CB	Mississippi State	
2	43	Tampa Bay Buccaneers	Johnthan Banks	CB	Mississippi State	
2	45	Arizona Cardinals	Kevin Minter	LB	LSU	
2	50	Chicago Bears	Jonathan Bostic	LB	Florida	
2	57	Houston Texans	D. J. Swearinger	S	South Carolina	
2	61	Green Bay Packers	Eddie Lacy	RB	Alabama	
2	62	Seattle Seahawks	Christine Michael	RB	Texas A&M	
3	65	Detroit Lions	Larry Warford	G	Kentucky	
3	67	Philadelphia Eagles	Bennie Logan	DT	LSU	
3	69	Arizona Cardinals	Tyrann Mathieu	CB	LSU	
3	77	Miami Dolphins	Dallas Thomas	G	Tennessee	
3	81	New York Giants	Damontre Moore	DE	Texas A&M	
3	82	New Orleans Saints	John Jenkins	DT	Georgia	
3	84	Cincinnati Bengals	Shawn Williams	S	Georgia	
3	85	Washington Redskins	Jordan Reed	TE	Florida	
3	88	San Francisco 49ers	Corey Lemonier	DE	Auburn	
3*	95	Houston Texans	Sam Montgomery	DE	LSU	
3*	96	Kansas City Chiefs	Knile Davis	RB	Arkansas	
3*	97	Tennessee Titans	Zaviar Gooden	LB	Missouri	
4	99	Kansas City Chiefs	Nico Johnson	LB	Alabama	
4	101	Jacksonville Jaguars	Ace Sanders	WR	South Carolina	
4	104	Miami Dolphins	Jelani Jenkins	LB	Florida	
4	112	Oakland Raiders	Tyler Wilson	QB	Arkansas	
4	113	St. Louis Rams	Barrett Jones	G	Alabama	
4	118	Cincinnati Bengals	Sean Porter	LB	Texas A&M	
4*	131	San Francisco 49ers	Marcus Lattimore	RB	South Carolina	
4*	132	Detroit Lions	Devin Taylor	DE	South Carolina	
5	134	Kansas City Chiefs	Sanders Commings	CB	Georgia	
5	137	Seattle Seahawks	Jesse Williams	DT	Alabama	
5	138	Seattle Seahawks	Tharold Simon	CB	LSU	
5	142	Tennessee Titans	Lavar Edwards	DE	LSU	
5	157	San Francisco 49ers	Quinton Dial	DE	Alabama	
5	160	St. Louis Rams	Zac Stacy	RB	Vanderbilt	
5	161	Denver Broncos	Tavarres King	WR	Georgia	
5	164	Miami Dolphins	Mike Gillislee	RB	Florida	
5*	166	Miami Dolphins	Caleb Sturgis	K	Florida	
5*	167	Green Bay Packers	Josh Boyd	DT	Mississippi State	
6	169	Jacksonville Jaguars	Josh Evans	S	Florida	
6	174	Arizona Cardinals	Ryan Swope	WR	Texas A&M	
6	184	Oakland Raiders	Mychal Rivera	TE	Tennessee	
6	185	Dallas Cowboys	DeVonte Holloman	LB	South Carolina	
6	188	Chicago Bears	Cornelius Washington	DE	Georgia	
6	191	Washington Redskins	Bacarri Rambo	S	Georgia	
6	194	Seattle Seahawks	Spencer Ware	RB	LSU	
6	197	Cincinnati Bengals	Cobi Hamilton	WR	Arkansas	
7	211	Detroit Lions	Michael Williams	TE	Alabama	
7	220	Seattle Seahawks	Ryan Seymour	G	Vanderbilt	
7	222	Buffalo Bills	Chris Gragg	TE	Arkansas	
7*	251	Cincinnati Bengals	T. J. Johnson	C	South Carolina	
7*	254	Indianapolis Colts	Justice Cunningham	TE	South Carolina	

== Home attendance ==
Team	Stadium	Capacity	Game 1	Game 2	Game 3	Game 4	Game 5	Game 6	Game 7	Game 8	Total	Average	% of Capacity
Alabama	Bryant–Denny Stadium	101,821	101,821	101,821	101,821	101,821	101,821	101,126	101,821	—	712,052	101,722	99.90%
Arkansas	Razorback Stadium	72,000	71,062	53,089^{A}	74,617	72,543	67,153	55,378^{A}	64,451	71,117	529,410	70,014	97.99%
Auburn	Jordan–Hare Stadium	87,451	85,214	86,721	85,813	85,119	74,676	86,146	74,832	—	578,521	82,646	94.51%
Florida	Ben Hill Griffin Stadium	88,548	84,704	87,102	90,824	90,833	90,496	86,482	82,691	—	613,132	87,590	98.92%
Georgia	Sanford Stadium	92,746	92,446	92,746	92,746	92,746	92,746	92,746	92,746	—	648,922	92,703	99.95%
Kentucky	Commonwealth Stadium	67,942	48,346	53,980	49,810	49,498	54,553	44,902	14,245 (this was the record attendance for the game)	—	347,838	49,691	73.14%
LSU	Tiger Stadium	92,542	92,059	92,804	92,177	92,154	92,734	93,374	92,831	92,872	741,005	92,626	100.10%
Mississippi State	Davis Wade	55,082	55,082	56,111	55,186	57,831	55,108	55,240	54,838	—	389,396	55,628	100.99%
Missouri	Faurot Field	71,004	62,173	71,004	71,004	66,250	71,004	67,853	63,045	—	472,333	67,476	95.03%
Ole Miss	Vaught–Hemingway	60,580	50,544	53,133	61,797	55,343	57,068	60,572	61,005	—	399,462	57,066	94.19%
South Carolina	Williams-Brice Stadium	80,250	77,006	77,963	80,836	85,199	80,250	78,772	79,982	—	560,008	80,001	99.69%
Tennessee	Neyland Stadium	102,455	87,821	102,455	81,719	102,455	84,189	89,272	81,841	—	629,752	89,965	87.81%
Texas A&M	Kyle Field	82,589	87,114	86,775	86,442	87,429	87,101	87,222	—	—	522,083	87,014	105.36%
Vanderbilt	Vanderbilt Stadium	40,550	38,393	35,491	40,350	40,350	32,227	40,350	—	—	227,161	37,860	93.37%

^AGames played at Arkansas' secondary home stadium War Memorial Stadium, capacity: 54,120.

Attendance was 84,644 for the Florida vs. Georgia game in Jacksonville
