= D. J. Swearinger =

American football player (born 1991)

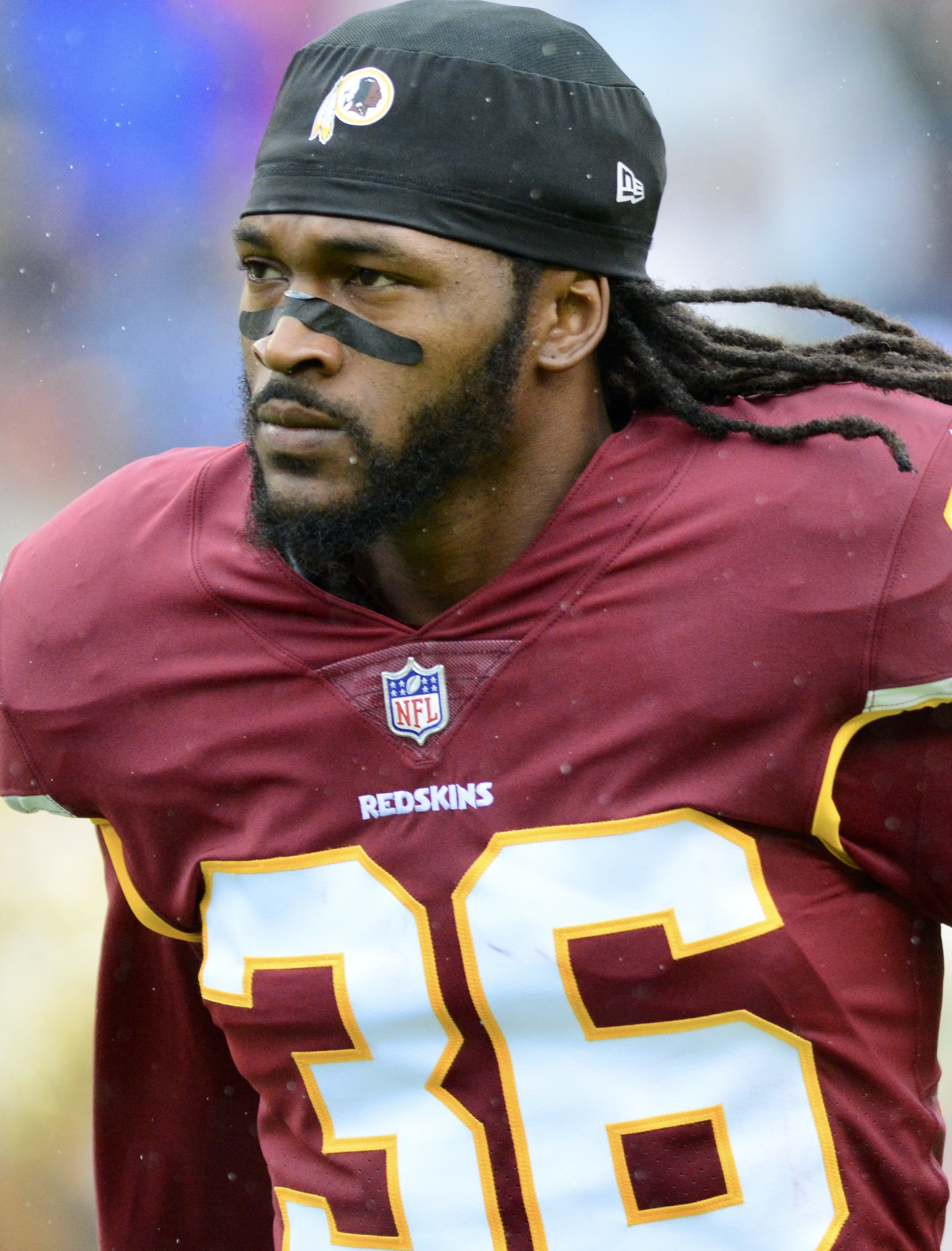
- Swearinger with the Washington Redskins in 2018

Profile
- Position: Safety

Personal information
- Born: September 1, 1991 (age 35); Greenwood, South Carolina, U.S.
- Listed height: 5 ft 10 in (1.78 m)
- Listed weight: 205 lb (93 kg)

Career information
- High school: Greenwood (SC)
- College: South Carolina (2009–2012)
- NFL draft: 2013: 2nd round, 57th overall pick

Career history
- Houston Texans (2013–2014); Tampa Bay Buccaneers (2015); Arizona Cardinals (2015–2016); Washington Redskins (2017–2018); Arizona Cardinals (2018–2019); Oakland Raiders (2019); New Orleans Saints (2019–2020); Indianapolis Colts (2021)*; DC Defenders (2023–2024)
- * Offseason or practice squad member only

Awards and highlights
- Second-team All-SEC (2012)

Career NFL statistics
- Total tackles: 425
- Sacks: 4.5
- Forced fumbles: 9
- Fumble recoveries: 4
- Pass deflections: 43
- Interceptions: 14
- Stats at Pro Football Reference

Dayarlo Jamal Swearinger Sr. (/ˈswɛərɪndʒər/ SWAIR-in-jər; born September 1, 1991) is an American professional football safety. He played college football at South Carolina and was selected by the Houston Texans in the second round of the 2013 NFL draft. He has also been a member of the Tampa Bay Buccaneers, Arizona Cardinals, Washington Redskins, Oakland Raiders, New Orleans Saints, Indianapolis Colts, and DC Defenders.

== Early life ==
Swearinger attended Greenwood High School in Greenwood, South Carolina, where he played alongside former South Carolina Gamecocks football college teammate Kelcy Quarles and Washington Redskins' teammate Josh Norman. A two-way starter for the Greenwood Eagles football team, he rushed for 400 yards and logged 68 tackles and five interceptions as a sophomore. He had 516 rushing yards and nine touchdowns with 93 tackles and an interception as a junior. As a senior, he rushed for 904 yards and 12 touchdowns and caught 20 passes for 210 yards as a wide receiver. In addition, he also logged 77 tackles, broke up eight passes and caused two fumbles as a strong safety. He was named second-team All-State selection by The State. He was invited to play at the Shrine Bowl Game of the Carolinas, where he had an interception.

Also a standout in track & field, Swearinger competed in sprints, hurdles and jumps during the off-season as a junior and senior. At the 2009 Regional Meet, he took sixth in the 100-meter dash (10.81s), second in the 110m hurdles (14.56s) and placed first in the high jump (6-2 or 1.88m).

Regarded as a three-star prospect, Swearinger was considered the 20th-best safety in the nation and the 14th-best prospect in the state of South Carolina by Rivals.com. He was also rated as a three-star prospect and the nation's 82nd-best safety according to Scout.com. He was considered the state's ninth-best player by SuperPrep, and was named to PrepStar's All-Atlantic Region squad. Swearinger originally committed to Tennessee and also had an offer from North Carolina, among others.

== College career ==
Swearinger received an athletic scholarship to attend the University of South Carolina, where he played for coach Steve Spurrier's South Carolina Gamecocks football team from 2009 to 2012. During his college career, he started 33 of 52 games in which he appeared, recording 244 tackles, six interceptions and three touchdowns. Following his senior 2012 season, he was a second-team All-Southeastern Conference (SEC) selection.

== Professional career ==
Coming out of South Carolina, Swearinger was projected to be a second or third round pick by the majority of NFL draft experts and scouts. He received an invitation to the NFL combine and completed all of the required combine and positional drills. On March 27, 2013, he participated at South Carolina's pro day, along with Marcus Lattimore, Devin Taylor, Ace Sanders, T. J. Johnson, Justice Cunningham, DeVonte Holloman, Akeem Auguste, and ten other prospects. Team representatives and scouts from 31 NFL teams attended as Swearinger opted to run his 40-yard dash (4.65), 20-yard dash (2.68), and 10-yard dash (1.52) again, while also performing positional drills. He was ranked the fourth best free safety prospect in the draft by NFLDraftScout.com, the fourth best safety by NFL analyst Mike Mayock, and was ranked the fifth best safety prospect by Sports Illustrated.

Pre-draft measurables
Height	Weight	Arm length	Hand span	Wingspan	40-yard dash	10-yard split	20-yard split	20-yard shuttle	Three-cone drill	Vertical jump	Broad jump	Bench press	Wonderlic
5 ft 10 1/2 in (1.79 m)	208 lb (94 kg)	32 3/8 in (0.82 m)	9 1/2 in (0.24 m)	6 ft 5 5/8 in (1.97 m)	4.65 s	1.52 s	2.68 s	4.11 s	6.70 s	37.0 in (0.94 m)	10 ft 4 in (3.15 m)	17 reps	28
All values are from NFL Combine/Pro Day

=== Houston Texans ===
The Houston Texans selected Swearinger in the second round (57th overall) of the 2013 NFL draft. Swearinger was the fifth safety selected in the 2013 NFL draft.

==== 2013 ====
On July 22, 2013, the Houston Texans signed Swearinger to a four–year, $3.49 million contract.

He competed with Ed Reed and Shiloh Keo throughout training camp for the job as starting free safety. Head coach Gary Kubiak named him the third free safety on the Houston Texans' depth chart to begin the regular season.

On August 17, 2013, Swearinger hit Miami Dolphins' tight end Dustin Keller's right knee, tearing his ACL, MCL, and PCL, and also dislocating his knee. While some players deemed the hit as "dirty", Swearinger stated that he went low to avoid a fine and the player was not reprimanded by the NFL. Keller was released three days later and never played another down in the NFL.

He made his professional regular season debut in the Houston Texans' season-opener against the San Diego Chargers and recorded two solo tackles in their 31–28 victory. On October 13, 2013, he recorded two solo tackles and the Texans' starting strong safety Danieal Manning was injured with a hairline fracture of his right fibula during a 13–28 loss to the St. Louis Rams. The following week, Swearinger earned his first career start in place of Manning and recorded five solo tackles in a 16–17 loss to the Kansas City Chiefs. In a Week 10 matchup against the Arizona Cardinals, he recorded three combined tackles, deflected two passes, and caught the first interception of his career, off of a pass attempt by Carson Palmer during the Texans' 24–27 loss. On December 29, 2013, Swearinger recorded a season-high ten combined tackles in a 10–16 loss to the Tennessee Titans. After accumulating a 2–11 record, head coach Gary Kubiak was fired. He finished his rookie season with a total of 71 combined tackles (54 solo), made four pass deflections, and an interception in 16 games and ten starts. He was ranked the 71st best safety in the NFL out of 86 for the 2013 NFL season.

==== 2014 ====
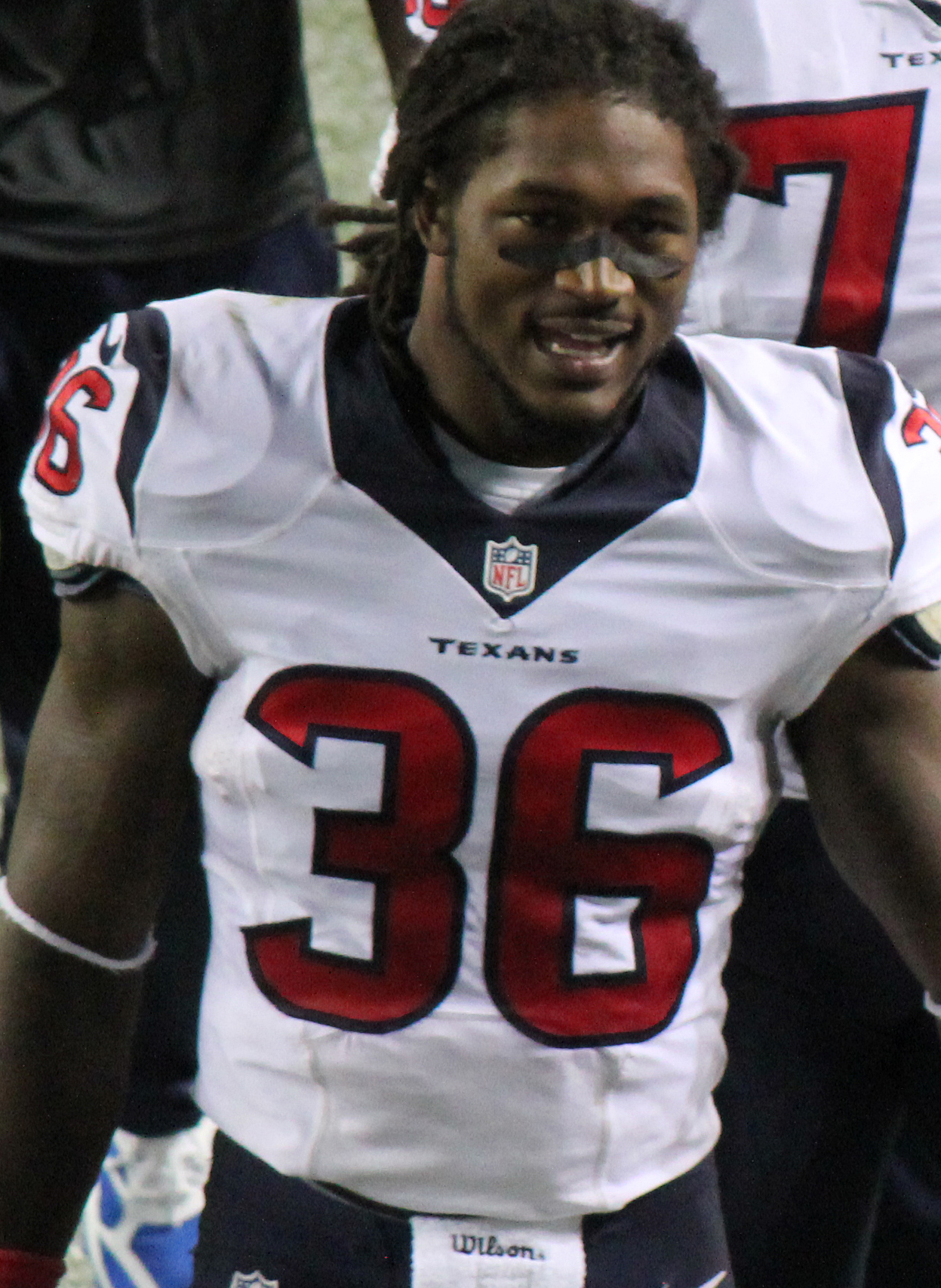
Swearinger playing for the Houston Texans in 2014.

Swearinger competed with Eddie Pleasant for the vacant starting strong safety job after Daniel Manning departed during the off season via free agency. New Houston Texans' head coach Bill O'Brien named Swearinger the starting strong safety to begin the 2014 season.

The next preseason, Swearinger was involved in a hit that caused a concussion on Denver Broncos wide receiver Wes Welker. On the following play, Broncos' quarterback Peyton Manning confronted Swearinger after completing a touchdown pass to Emmanuel Sanders, later resulting in Manning's first fine in his NFL career.

He started the Houston Texans' season-opener against the Washington Redskins' and recorded eight combined tackles and his first career sack on Robert Griffin III during their 17–6 victory. On October 26, 2014, he collected three combined tackles, deflected two passes, and intercepted a pass attempt by Tennessee Titans' quarterback Zach Mettenberger during the Texans' 30–16 victory. The next game, he tied his season-high of eight combined tackles, as the Houston Texans lost to the Philadelphia Eagles 21–31. He finished the season with a career-high 73 combined tackles (51 solo), six pass deflections, two interceptions, and a sack in 12 starts and 16 games. Pro Football Focus ranked him the 78th best safety out of 87 during the 2014 season. Under Defensive Coordinator Romeo Crennel, he was used as a safety/linebacker hybrid and was primarily used in the box for run support.

On May 11, 2015, the Houston Texans released Swearinger. It was reported they had attempting to trade Swearinger the past few weeks, the main cause being his reluctance to play special teams. He was also involved with multiple incidents including a reported theft involving his truck and his dog biting the Houston Texans' first overall pick in the 2014 NFL draft, Jadeveon Clowney (See Personal life).

=== Tampa Bay Buccaneers ===
On May 12, 2015, the Tampa Bay Buccaneers claimed Swearinger off of waivers.

He competed with Brad McDougald and Major Wright for the Buccaneers' starting strong safety position. Head coach Lovie Smith named him the backup strong safety to Major Wright to begin the regular season.

Swearinger made his professional regular season debut in the Tampa Bay Buccaneers' season-opening against the Tennessee Titans and made five combined tackles in their 14–42 loss. On September 27, 2015, he recorded a season-high six combined tackles in a 9–19 loss to his former team, the Houston Texans. He missed Week 9–10 with a toe injury.

On November 17, 2015, he was waived. During his stint in Tampa Bay, Swearinger was limited to 12 combined tackles (seven solo) in seven games and primarily played on special teams.

=== Arizona Cardinals (first stint) ===
==== 2015 ====
On December 1, 2015, Swearinger was signed to the Arizona Cardinals' practice squad. On December 8, 2015, the Arizona Cardinals promoted him to their active roster with Tyrann Mathieu out for the season. On December 10, 2015, he made his Arizona Cardinals' debut during a 23–20 victory over the Minnesota Vikings. The following week, he earned his first start of the season. and recorded three combined tackles and defended a pass, as the Cardinals defeated the Philadelphia Eagles 40–17. On December 20, 2015, Swearinger made one tackle and forced James Starks to fumble during the 38–8 victory over the Green Bay Packers. He finished the season with seven solo tackles, a pass deflection, and a forced fumble in four games and one start.

==== 2016 ====
On April 18, 2016, the Arizona Cardinals signed Swearinger to a one–year, $1.67 million contract.

He entered his first training camp with the Arizona Cardinals and competed with Tony Jefferson, Tyvon Branch, and Marqui Christian for the job as the starting safety. Head coach Bruce Arians named Tony Jefferson the starting strong safety and Swearinger began the regular season as the backup free safety to Tyrann Mathieu.

On September 18, 2016, Swearinger recorded a pass deflection and intercepted a pass attempt by Jameis Winston during the Cardinals' 40–7 victory over the Tampa Bay Buccaneers. On October 6, 2016, he earned his first start of the season and collected seven combined tackles, deflected a pass, and sacked San Francisco 49ers' quarterback Blaine Gabbert in their 33–21 victory. The following week, Swearinger recorded four solo tackles, two pass deflections, and intercepted a pass from Ryan Fitzpatrick during a 28–3 routing of the New York Jets. During a Week 12 matchup against the Atlanta Falcons, he earned a season-high seven combined tackles, defended two passes, and intercepted a pass attempt by Matt Ryan, as the Cardinals lost 19–38. On January 1, 2017, he recorded six solo tackles and sacked Jared Goff during a 44–6 win against the Los Angeles Rams. He had a resurgence during the 2016 season and finished with 66 combined tackles (58 solo), a career-high eight combined tackles, a career-high three interceptions, and a career-high two sacks in 16 games and 12 starts.

=== Washington Redskins ===
==== 2017 ====
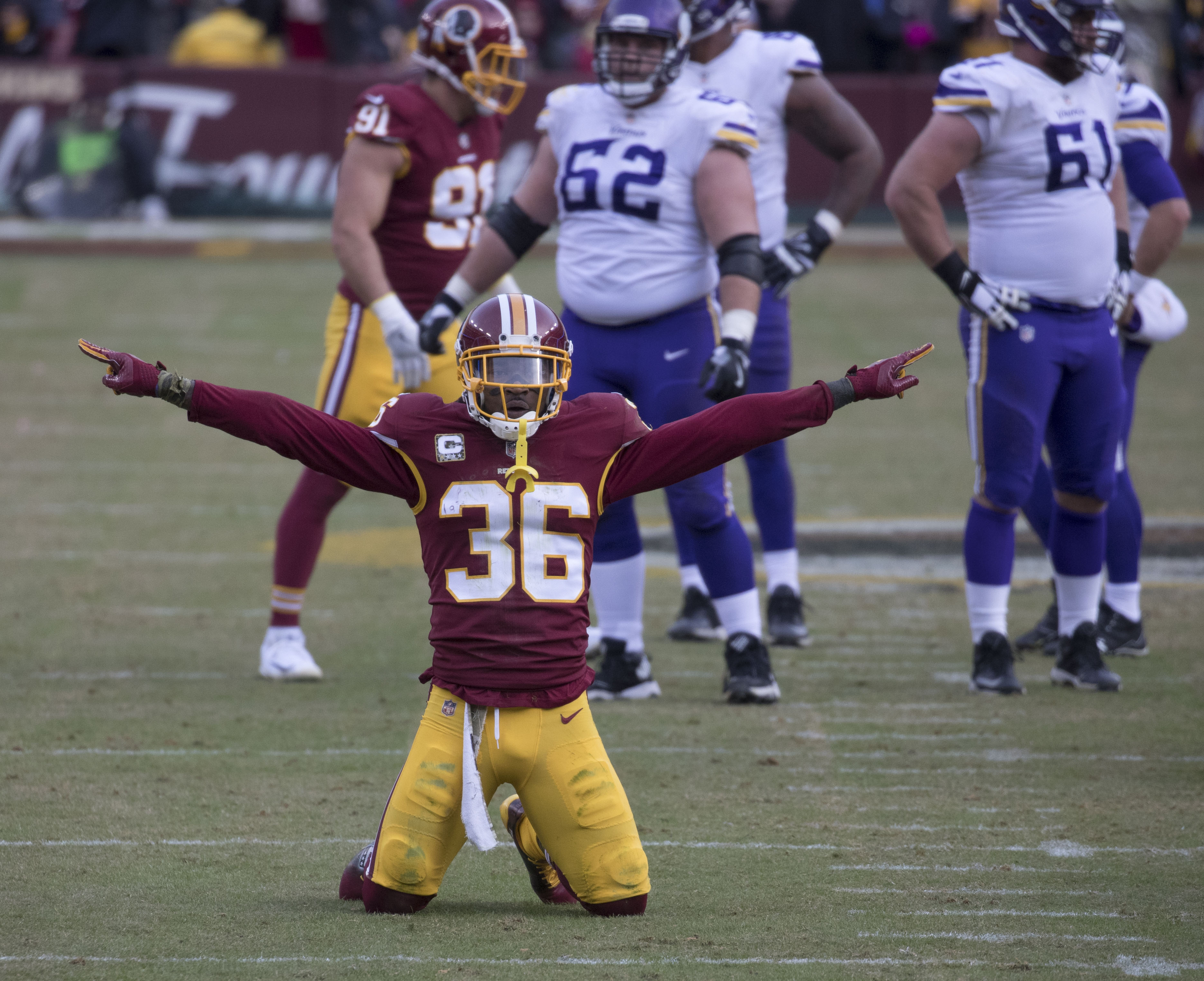
Swearinger celebrates after getting an interception against the Minnesota Vikings in 2017.

On March 9, 2017, the Washington Redskins signed Swearinger to a three–year, $13.5 million contract with $9 million guaranteed to a signing bonus of $4 million.

He competed with Su'a Cravens, Will Blackmon, Earl Wolff, and Montae Nicholson for the starting free safety job. Head coach Jay Gruden named Swearinger the starting free safety to begin the season. His teammates voted him the Washington Redskins' defensive captain, although he was a free agent acquisition and was a new member of the team.

Swearinger started the Washington Redskins' season-opener against the Philadelphia Eagles and made five solo tackle and deflected a pass during their 17–30 loss. He recorded two interceptions against quarterback Case Keenum in the Week 10 game against the Minnesota Vikings.

==== 2018 ====
Swearinger had an impressive outing in a Week 2 loss against the Indianapolis Colts, intercepting quarterback Andrew Luck twice to go along with 2 pass deflections. Six weeks later, in a 20–13 win over the New York Giants, Swearinger had another 2 interception performance, his second of the season. Though Swearinger led the Redskins both in interceptions (four) and passes defended (10), on December 24 he was released from the team following critical comments he made publicly towards the team's defensive coordinator Greg Manusky.

=== Arizona Cardinals (second stint) ===
On December 25, 2018, Swearinger was claimed off waivers by the Cardinals.

On September 30, 2019, Swearinger was released by the Cardinals after playing every snap through four games.

=== Oakland Raiders ===
On November 9, 2019, Swearinger was signed by the Oakland Raiders. He was released on December 10, 2019.

=== New Orleans Saints ===
Swearinger signed with the New Orleans Saints on December 19, 2019.

On April 6, 2020, Swearinger was re-signed to a one–year, $1.1 million contract. He was placed on the reserve/COVID-19 list by the team on January 2, 2021, and activated on January 11.

=== Indianapolis Colts ===
On December 28, 2021, Swearinger was signed to the Indianapolis Colts' practice squad.

=== DC Defenders ===
Swearinger signed with the DC Defenders of the XFL on April 5, 2023. He was released on April 30, 2024.

== NFL career statistics ==
Legend
**Bold**	Career high

Year	Team	Games		Tackles					Interceptions					Fumbles			
Year	Team	GP	GS	Cmb	Solo	Ast	Sck	TFL	Int	Yds	TD	Lng	PD	FF	FR	Yds	TD
2013	HOU	16	10	71	54	17	0.0	3	1	0	0	0	4	1	0	0	0
2014	HOU	16	12	73	51	**22**	1.0	3	2	31	0	25	6	**3**	**1**	0	0
2015	TAM	7	0	12	9	3	0.0	0	0	0	0	0	0	0	**1**	**12**	0
2015	ARI	4	1	7	7	0	0.0	0	0	0	0	0	1	1	**1**	0	0
2016	ARI	16	12	66	58	8	**2.0**	**5**	3	13	0	12	8	0	0	0	0
2017	WAS	16	16	**79**	**61**	18	0.5	2	**4**	32	0	**31**	**10**	1	0	0	0
2018	WAS	15	15	53	42	11	1.0	0	**4**	**33**	0	22	**10**	**3**	**1**	0	0
2019	ARI	4	4	28	17	11	0.0	0	0	0	0	0	1	0	0	0	0
2019	OAK	4	3	20	15	5	0.0	0	0	0	0	0	1	0	0	0	0
2019	NOR	1	0	2	0	2	0.0	0	0	0	0	0	1	0	0	0	0
2020	NOR	11	0	14	13	1	0.0	0	0	0	0	0	1	0	0	0	0
		110	73	425	327	98	4.5	13	14	109	0	31	43	9	4	12	0
