= 2012 All-SEC football team =

American college football all-star team

The 2012 All-SEC football team consists of American football players selected to the All-Southeastern Conference (SEC) chosen by various selectors for the 2012 Southeastern Conference football season.

The Alabama Crimson Tide won the conference, beating the Georgia Bulldogs 32 to 28 in the SEC Championship. The Crimson Tide then won a national championship, defeating the Notre Dame Fighting Irish 42 to 14 in the 2013 BCS National Championship Game.

Texas A&M quarterback Johnny Manziel, a unanimous AP selection, won the Heisman Trophy, the first freshman to do so, and was unanimously voted the SEC Offensive Player of the Year by both AP and the coaches. Georgia linebacker Jarvis Jones, also a unanimous AP selection, was voted the AP SEC Defensive Player of the Year. South Carolina defensive end Jadeveon Clowney, also a unanimous AP selection, was voted the coaches' SEC Defensive Player of the Year.

== Offensive selections ==
=== Quarterbacks ===
- Johnny Manziel*, Texas A&M (AP-1, Coaches-1)
- A. J. McCarron, Alabama (AP-2, Coaches-2)

=== Running backs ===
- Mike Gillislee, Florida (AP-1, Coaches-1)
- Todd Gurley, Georgia (AP-1, Coaches-2)
- Eddie Lacy, Alabama (AP-2, Coaches-1)
- Zac Stacy, Vanderbilt (AP-2, Coaches-2)

=== Wide receivers ===
- Cobi Hamilton*, Arkansas (AP-1, Coaches-1)
- Jordan Matthews, Vanderbilt (AP-1, Coaches-1)
- Justin Hunter, Tennessee (AP-2, Coaches-2)
- Chad Bumphis, Miss. St. (AP-2)
- Ryan Swope, Texas A&M (Coaches-2)

=== Centers ===
- Barrett Jones*, Alabama (AP-1, Coaches-1)
- Travis Swanson, Arkansas (AP-2)
- T. J. Johnson, South Carolina (Coaches-2)

=== Guards ===
- Chance Warmack, Alabama (AP-1, Coaches-1)
- Gabe Jackson, Miss. St. (AP-1, Coaches-2)
- Larry Warford, Kentucky (AP-2, Coaches-1)
- D. J. Fluker, Alabama (AP-2, Coaches-1)
- Chris Burnette, Georgia (Coaches-2)

=== Tackles ===
- Jake Matthews, Texas A&M (AP-1, Coaches-1)
- Luke Joeckel, Texas A&M (AP-1, Coaches-1)
- Dallas Thomas, Tennessee (AP-2, Coaches-2)
- Antonio Richardson, Tennessee (AP-2)

=== Tight ends ===
- Jordan Reed, Florida (AP-1, Coaches-2)
- Mychal Rivera, Tennessee (AP-2, Coaches-1)

== Defensive selections ==
=== Defensive ends ===
- Jadeveon Clowney*, South Carolina (AP-1, Coaches-1)
- Damontre Moore, Texas A&M (AP-1, Coaches-1)
- Sam Montgomery, LSU (AP-2, Coaches-1)
- Barkevious Mingo, LSU (AP-2 [lb], Coaches-2)
- Corey Lemonier, Auburn (Coaches-2)

=== Defensive tackles ===
- Sharrif Floyd, Florida (AP-1, Coaches-1)
- Sheldon Richardson, Missouri (AP-1, Coaches-2)
- John Jenkins, Georgia (AP-2, Coaches-2)
- Jesse Williams, Alabama (AP-2)
- Bennie Logan, LSU (AP-2)

=== Linebackers ===
- Jarvis Jones*, Georgia (AP-1, Coaches-1)
- C. J. Mosley, Alabama (AP-1, Coaches-1)
- Kevin Minter, LSU (AP-1, Coaches-1)
- Alec Ogletree, Georgia (AP-2, Coaches-2)
- Lamin Barrow, LSU (AP-2, Coaches-2)
- Cameron Lawrence, Miss. St. (AP-2)
- Denzel Nkemdiche, Ole Miss (AP-2)
- Jon Bostic, Florida (Coaches-2)
- A. J. Johnson, Tennessee (Coaches-2)

=== Cornerbacks ===
- Johnthan Banks*, Miss. St. (AP-1, Coaches-1)
- Dee Milliner*, Alabama (AP-1, Coaches-1)
- Andre Hal, Vanderbilt (AP-2)
- Marcus Roberson, Florida (AP-2)
- Darius Slay, Miss. St. (Coaches-2)

=== Safeties ===
- Matt Elam, Florida (AP-1, Coaches-1)
- Eric Reid, LSU (AP-1, Coaches-1)
- D. J. Swearinger, South Carolina (AP-2, Coaches-2)
- Craig Loston, LSU (AP-2)
- Bacarri Rambo, Georgia (Coaches-2)
- Robert Lester, Alabama (Coaches-2)

== Special teams ==
=== Kickers ===
- Caleb Sturgis, Florida (AP-1, Coaches-1)
- Carey Spear, Vanderbilt (AP-2)
- Drew Alleman, LSU (Coaches-2)

=== Punters ===
- Kyle Christy, Florida (AP-1, Coaches-1)
- Dylan Breeding, Arkansas (AP-2, Coaches-2)

=== All purpose/return specialist ===
- Cordarrelle Patterson, Tennessee (AP-1, Coaches-1)
- Ace Sanders, South Carolina (AP-2, Coaches-2)
- LaDarius Perkins, Miss. St. (AP-2)

== Key ==
Bold = Consensus first-team selection by both the coaches and AP

AP = Associated Press

Coaches = Selected by the SEC coaches

* = Unanimous selection of AP

== See also ==
- 2012 Southeastern Conference football season
- 2012 College Football All-America Team
