= Victor Hampton =

Victor Hampton is the name of:

- Victor Hampton (American football) (born 1992), American football cornerback for the Baltimore Ravens
- Victor Hampton (EastEnders), fictional character
