= Luke Joeckel =

American football player (born 1991)

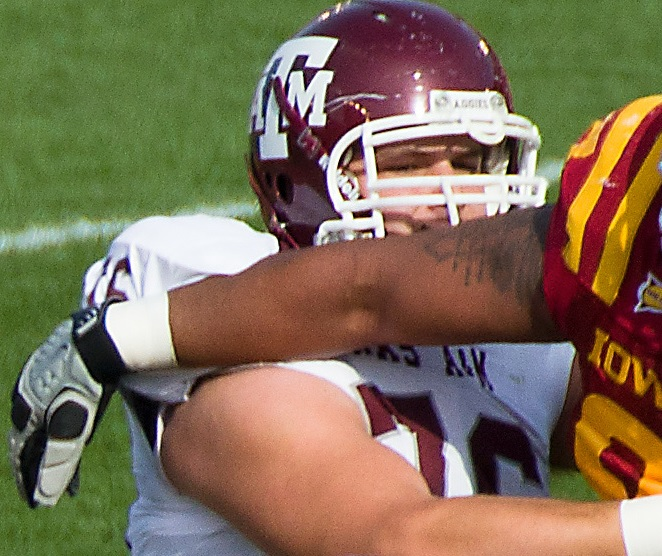
- Joeckel with the Texas A&M Aggies in 2011

No. 76, 78
- Position: Offensive tackle

Personal information
- Born: November 6, 1991 (age 35); Arlington, Texas, U.S.
- Listed height: 6 ft 6 in (1.98 m)
- Listed weight: 307 lb (139 kg)

Career information
- High school: Arlington
- College: Texas A&M (2010–2012)
- NFL draft: 2013: 1st round, 2nd overall pick

Career history
- Jacksonville Jaguars (2013–2016); Seattle Seahawks (2017)

Awards and highlights
- Outland Trophy (2012); Jim Parker Trophy (2012); Unanimous All-American (2012); Jacobs Blocking Trophy (2012); 2× First-team All-SEC (2011, 2012)

Career NFL statistics
- Games played: 50
- Games started: 50
- Stats at Pro Football Reference

Luke Tobias Joeckel (/ˈdʒoʊkəl/; born November 6, 1991) is an American former professional football player who was an offensive tackle in the National Football League (NFL). He was selected by the Jacksonville Jaguars second overall in the 2013 NFL draft. He played college football for the Texas A&M Aggies, starting all 37 games at left tackle from 2010 to 2012. In his final year, he won the Outland Trophy, awarded to the nation's top college football interior lineman, and was named a unanimous All-American. He was also a member of the Seattle Seahawks.

== Early life ==
A native of Arlington, Texas, Joeckel attended Arlington High School, where he was an All-State offensive lineman for the football team. As a senior, he anchored an offensive line that averaged just under 475 yards per game in the 2009 season. His twin brother, Matt, played quarterback for Arlington. His older brother, David, played offensive lineman at DePauw. Joeckel's father, David, now a trial lawyer in Fort Worth, was a four-year letterman and three-year starter as an offensive lineman at Texas Tech (teammates with Joe Walter), under coaches Rex Dockery and Jerry Moore, 1979–1982. His grandfather, Reece Washington, played tight end for Texas Tech.

In track & field, Joeckel competed in the throwing events. He had top-throws of 13.10 meters (42 ft 11 in) in the shot put and 34.44 meters (112 ft 7 in) in the discus throw.

Regarded as a four-star recruit by Rivals.com, Joeckel was listed as the No. 5 offensive tackle prospect of the class of 2010, behind only Seantrel Henderson, Rob Crisp, Shon Coleman, and James Hurst. Despite growing up as a Red Raiders fan, Joeckel chose Texas A&M over Texas Tech. He also had offers from Alabama, Louisiana State, Nebraska, and Oklahoma, among others.

== College career ==
Joeckel attended Texas A&M University, where he played for the Texas A&M Aggies football team from 2010 to 2012. He enrolled in January 2010, and went through the Aggies' spring drills. As a true freshman in 2010, Joeckel started all 13 games at left tackle. The Aggies averaged over 165.8 rushing yards per game and featured a 100-yard rusher in nine games, six of which belong to Cyrus Gray. Joeckel earned Freshman All-American honors by the Football Writers Association of America and Scout.com.

As a sophomore in 2011, Joeckel started all 13 games again and was a second-team All-Big 12 noselection. He was part of an Aggies offensive front that allowed just nine sacks in 13 games and set school records for total (490.2 yards per game), passing (291.1 yards), and scoring (39.1 points) offense.

As a junior in 2012, Joeckel started all 13 games at left tackle, protecting freshman quarterback Johnny Manziel's blind side as he went on to pass for 3,706 yards over the season, earning him Heisman, Manning, and O'Brien honors. Joeckel himself won the Outland Trophy, awarded to the nation's top college football interior lineman, and was named a unanimous All-American.

NFL scouts praised his performance against Louisiana State's talented defensive line, in which Joeckel matched-up well against defensive end Sam Montgomery. "I think he is better than Joe Thomas and Matt Kalil," one NFL general manager said according to Pro Football Weekly.

Joeckel played alongside future Atlanta Falcon Jake Matthews, who played right tackle from 2010–2012. When Joeckel left Texas A&M, Matthews switched to left tackle in 2013. In September 2013, after an NFL.com writer asked five NFL executives who was the better player between Matthews and Joeckel, three of the executives said Joeckel.

== Professional career ==
=== 2013 NFL draft ===
By midseason, Joeckel was projected as a Top 10 selection in the 2013 NFL draft by Sports Illustrated. Ranking him #1 on their "Big Board", CBS Sports projected Joeckel as the first offensive tackle to be selected with the first overall draft pick since Jake Long in 2008. On January 8, 2013, Joeckel announced his decision to forgo his final year of eligibility. According to CBS Sports, Joeckel lacks the "natural tools" of the 2012 fourth overall pick Matt Kalil, but "is considered the more polished lineman out of the college ranks". NFL.com analysts Gil Brandt, Brian Billick, Scott Pioli, and Charles Davis predicted that Joeckel would be the No. 1 pick. In late January, Sports Illustrated also projected Joeckel to be the No. 1 selection.

Pre-draft measurables
Height	Weight	Arm length	Hand span	40-yard dash	10-yard split	20-yard split	20-yard shuttle	Three-cone drill	Vertical jump	Broad jump	Bench press
6 ft 6 in (1.98 m)	306 lb (139 kg)	34 1/4 in (0.87 m)	10 1/8 in (0.26 m)	5.30 s	1.83 s	3.07 s	4.68 s	7.40 s	28 1/2 in (0.72 m)	8 ft 10 in (2.69 m)	27 reps
All values from NFL Combine

After the combine, Sports Illustrated still projected Joeckel to be the first player selected in the 2013 NFL Draft. In March 2013, Pat Kirwan of CBSSports.com, projected Joeckel to be selected fourth overall, by the Philadelphia Eagles.

A week before the draft, the Chiefs were believed to take an offensive tackle at No. 1, after having traded for quarterback Alex Smith. Their decision reportedly came down to Joeckel and Eric Fisher. The Chiefs selected Fisher, allowing Joeckel to fall to the Jaguars, who selected him second overall. Joeckel stated that his immediate reaction to not being selected first overall was "not the most pleasant thing ever", though added that he has used it as motivation. Joeckel became the first Aggie offensive lineman selected in the first round since Richmond Webb went ninth overall to the Miami Dolphins in 1990.

=== Jacksonville Jaguars ===
Despite playing at the left tackle position during his college years, Joeckel began his professional career at right tackle. Joeckel signed a four-year contract with the Jaguars on June 22, 2013, that included a $13.8 million signing bonus and was worth approximately $21 million. After the Jaguars traded left tackle Eugene Monroe to the Baltimore Ravens on October 1, Joeckel returned to his natural position on the left side. Joeckel's rookie season became short-lived as he played in only five games due to sustaining an ankle injury the next Sunday against the St. Louis Rams, when Rams defensive tackle Kendall Langford rolled up Joeckel's leg. Later that day, it was announced he would miss the remainder of the season. He was placed on injured reserve on October 8.

Joeckel entered his second season having recovered from the injury during his rookie season. Pro Football Focus viewed him as one of the worst offensive tackles in the NFL in 2014 and held him responsible for eight quarterback sacks. In the 2014 season, Joeckel started all 16 games at left tackle.

In the 2015 season, Joeckel started 14 games at the left tackle position.

On May 2, 2016, it was announced that the Jaguars would not pick up the fifth-year option on Joeckel's contract. On August 30, head coach Gus Bradley announced that Joeckel would switch to the left guard position while the newly acquired free agent Kelvin Beachum took over at left tackle.

Joeckel was placed on injured reserve on October 4, 2016, after undergoing knee surgery.

Overall, Joeckel started 35 games at left tackle from 2013–2015, and four games at left guard in 2016.

=== Seattle Seahawks ===
On March 11, 2017, Joeckel signed a one-year contract with the Seattle Seahawks. He started 11 games at left guard for the Seahawks in 2017.
