= 2013 Outback Bowl =

- 27th Outback Bowl
South Carolina Gamecocks	Michigan Wolverines
(10–2)	(8–4)
SEC	Big Ten
33	28
Head coach: Steve Spurrier	Head coach: Brady Hoke
AP / Coaches / BCS; 11 / 10 / 10	AP / Coaches / BCS; 19 / 22 / 18
	1	2	3	4	Total
South Carolina	14	7	0	12	33
Michigan	3	10	9	6	28
- Date: January 1, 2013
- Season: 2012
- Stadium: Raymond James Stadium
- Location: Tampa, Florida
- MVP: Ace Sanders (WR- S. Carolina)
- Favorite: South Carolina by 10
- Referee: Jeff Maconaghy (Big East)
- Halftime show: Both schools' bands performed a show; in addition 20 high schools bands from across the nation combined as 1 giant band
- Attendance: 54,527
- Payout: US$3.4 million per team

United States TV coverage
- Network: ESPN
- Announcers: Mike Tirico (play-by-play); Jon Gruden (analyst); Shannon Spake (sidelines)
- Nielsen ratings: 4.3 (7 Million viewers)

The 2013 Outback Bowl was a post-season American college football bowl game, held on January 1, 2013, at Raymond James Stadium in Tampa, Florida, as part of the 2012–13 NCAA bowl season. It was the 27th edition of the Outback Bowl, named after sponsor Outback Steakhouse, and was telecast at 1:00 p.m. ET on ESPN. It featured the South Carolina Gamecocks from the Southeastern Conference (SEC) versus the Michigan Wolverines from the Big Ten Conference. South Carolina won with a final score of 33–28.

South Carolina finished their season with 11 wins for only the second time in school history, while Michigan endured their second bowl loss in three years.

"The Hit" by South Carolina defensive end Jadeveon Clowney has often been considered one of the greatest defensive plays in college football history, as well as one of the greatest college football plays from the 2010s.

== Teams ==
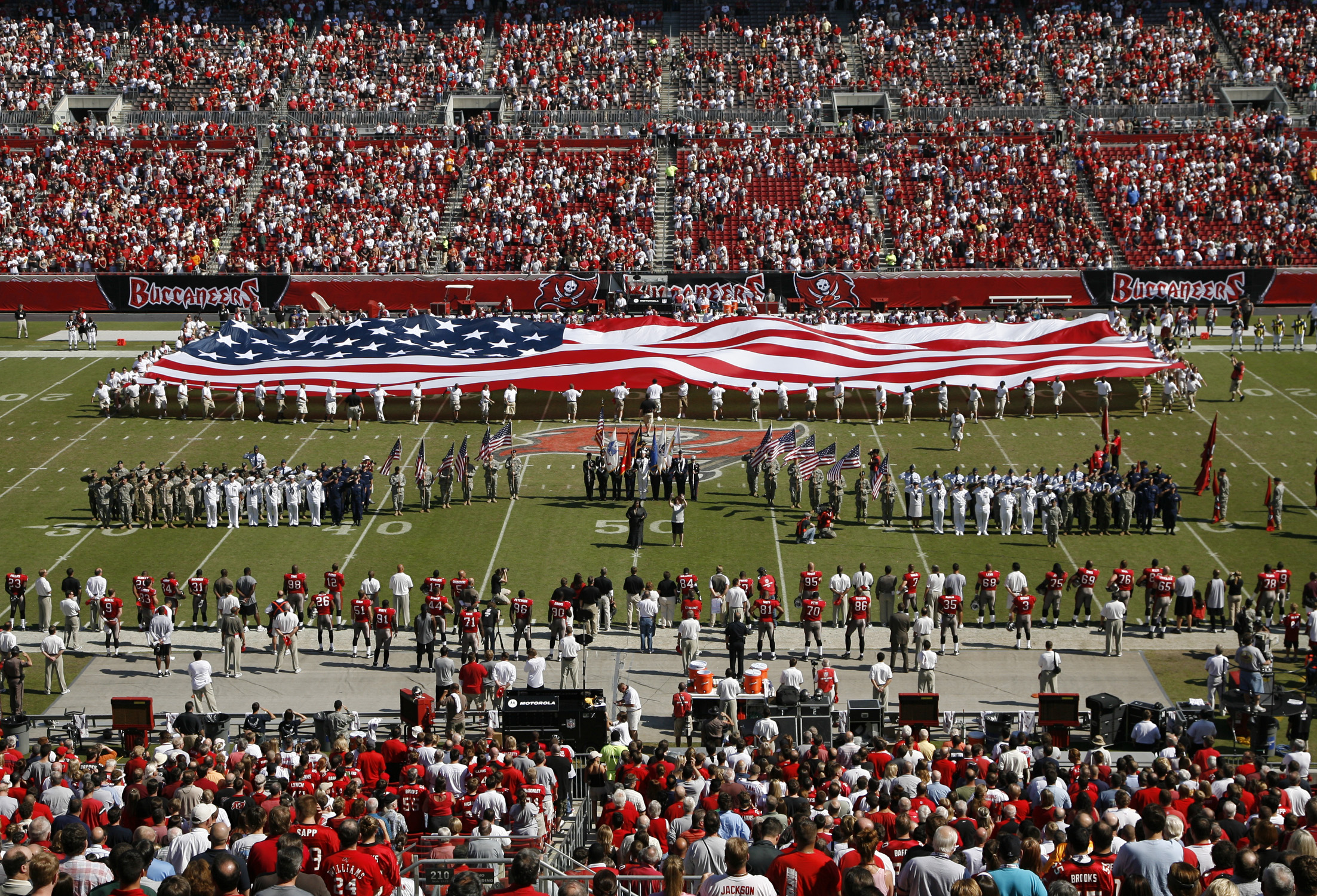
The 2013 Outback Bowl was played at Raymond James Stadium.

The Michigan Wolverines and South Carolina Gamecocks had met twice before, in the 1980s, and entered this contest with the series tied at 1-1.

=== South Carolina ===
South Carolina entered the game with a 10–2 record, having lost to #14 LSU and #9 Florida.

=== Michigan ===
Michigan entered the game with an 8–4 record, having lost to #1 Alabama, #4 Notre Dame, #3 Ohio State and #25 Nebraska.

== The Hit ==
"The Hit" is widely considered to mark the turning point in the game for South Carolina and it earned a "Best Play" ESPY Award for South Carolina's Jadeveon Clowney.

"The Hit" refers to a play by defensive end Jadeveon Clowney which occurred midway through the fourth quarter of the game. After a Wolverines fake punt, followed by a controversial call awarding Michigan a first down during a critical time-consuming drive, Clowney gained instant fame for his tackle of Michigan running back Vincent Smith that came with 8:21 remaining in the fourth quarter. "The Hit" dislodged Smith's helmet and forced a fumble that Clowney himself recovered. "The Hit" set up a touchdown pass to wide receiver Ace Sanders on the next play. Although "The Hit" itself did not result in the game-winning touchdown, it is considered by many to have motivated a previously lethargic Gamecock offense to rally and ultimately win the game.

== Game summary ==
=== Scoring summary ===
Source.

Scoring summary

Quarter	Time	Drive			Team	Scoring information	Score	
Quarter	Time	Plays	Yards	TOP	Team	Scoring information	USC	UM
1	13:26	3	67	1:34	USC	Damiere Byrd 56 yd pass from Connor Shaw (Adam Yates kick)	7	0
1	7:28	8	51	3:14	UM	39-yard field goal by Brendan Gibbons	7	3
1	3:29	3	-10	1:58	USC	Ace Sanders 63 Yd Punt Return. (Adam Yates Kick)	14	3
2	12:41	11	76	5:48	UM	Drew Dileo 5 Yd pass from Devin Gardner. (Brendan Gibbons Kick)	14	10
2	10:54	4	75	1:47	USC	Ace Sanders 4 Yd pass from Dylan Thompson. (Adam Yates Kick)	21	10
2	2:47	8	8	4:34	UM	40-yard field goal by Brendan Gibbons	21	13
3	6:54	11	45	4:29	UM	52-yard field goal by Matt Wile	21	16
3	0:02	10	65	4:28	UM	Jeremy Gallon 10 Yd pass from Devin Gardner. (Two-Point Pass Conversion Failed)	21	22
4	8:06	1	31	0:04	USC	Ace Sanders 31 Yd pass from Connor Shaw. (Two-Point Pass Conversion Failed)	27	22
4	3:29	10	64	4:37	UM	Jeremy Gallon 17 Yd pass from Devin Gardner. (Two-Point Rush Conversion Failed)	27	28
4	0:11	11	70	3:18	USC	Bruce Ellington 32 Yd pass from Dylan Thompson. (Two-Point Pass Conversion Failed)	33	28
"TOP" = time of possession. For other American football terms, see Glossary of American football.							33	28

=== Statistics ===
Statistics	USC	UM
First downs	17	24
Rushes-yards (net)	17–85	45–141
Passing yards (net)	341	214
Passes, Att-Comp-Int	36–25–0	37–18–1
Total yards	426	355
Time of Possession	22:01	37:59

== Aftermath and legacy ==
With a victory in their bowl game, South Carolina would finish the season ranked No. 8 in the AP Poll, the highest final ranking in program history until then. It remains the second highest final ranking in school history.

Meanwhile, despite the loss, Michigan would also finish ranked in the AP Poll (for the second consecutive season, and for only the second time since 2008). Head coach Brady Hoke would coach at Michigan for two more seasons before being fired.

"The Hit" has often been considered the greatest play of the 2012 season, one of the greatest defensive plays in college football history, and one of the greatest college football plays from the 2010s. It propelled Clowney to instant fame, and he would go on to be the first overall pick in the 2014 NFL draft. It has also been called "one of the last tackles of the pre-targeting era" and "truly the last of its kind, a savage hit unencumbered by the threat of [ejection]". Nine months after the play, starting in the 2013 season, the NCAA implemented a new rule that required officials to eject players for targeting an opponent's head during a hit.

Under new head coaches, South Carolina and Michigan would rematch in the same bowl game exactly five years later, with the Gamecocks winning by a score of 26–19.
