= Jon Bostic =

American football player (born 1991)

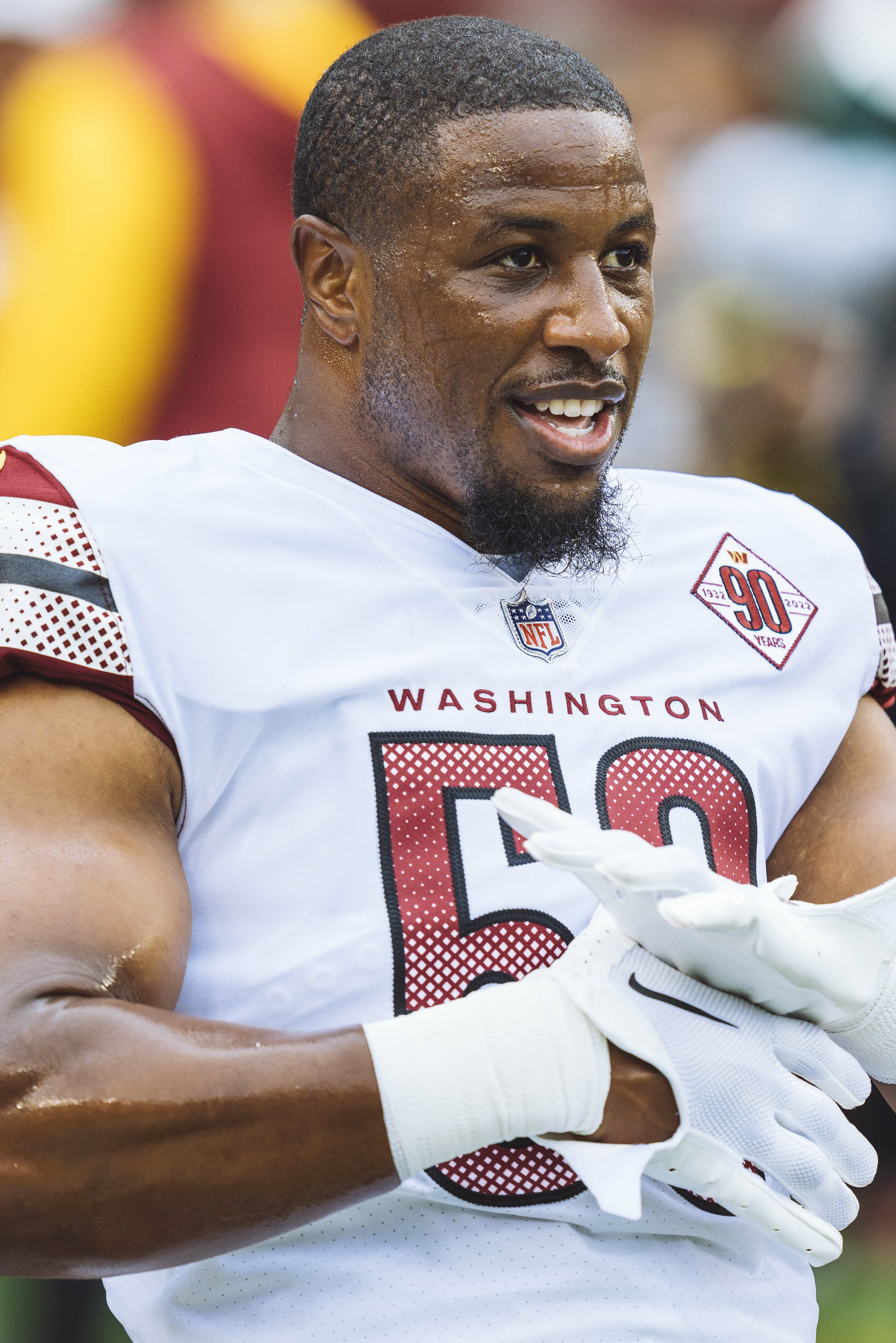
- Bostic with the Washington Commanders in 2022

No. 57, 58, 51, 53, 59
- Position: Linebacker

Personal information
- Born: May 5, 1991 (age 35); Atlanta, Georgia, U.S.
- Listed height: 6 ft 1 in (1.85 m)
- Listed weight: 245 lb (111 kg)

Career information
- High school: Palm Beach Central (Wellington, Florida)
- College: Florida (2009–2012)
- NFL draft: 2013: 2nd round, 50th overall pick

Career history
- Chicago Bears (2013–2015); New England Patriots (2015); Detroit Lions (2016); Indianapolis Colts (2017); Pittsburgh Steelers (2018); Washington Redskins / Football Team (2019–2021); New Orleans Saints (2022)*; Washington Commanders (2022)
- * Offseason or practice squad member only

Awards and highlights
- Second-team All-SEC (2012)

Career NFL statistics
- Total tackles: 584
- Sacks: 9.5
- Fumble recoveries: 2
- Pass deflections: 15
- Interceptions: 3
- Stats at Pro Football Reference

Jonathan Earl Bostic II (born May 5, 1991) is an American former professional football player who was a linebacker in the National Football League (NFL). He played college football for the Florida Gators and was selected by the Chicago Bears in the second round of the 2013 NFL draft. Bostic was also a member of the New England Patriots, Detroit Lions, Indianapolis Colts, Pittsburgh Steelers, Washington Commanders, and New Orleans Saints.

== Early life ==
Bostic was born in Atlanta, Georgia, to John Bostic and Jacqueline Bostic. His father was a defensive back for the Detroit Lions from 1985 to 1987. After his father retired from the NFL, he gained his Doctor of Pharmacy degree and eventually relocated his family to Wellington, Florida. Bostic attended Palm Beach Central High School in Wellington, where he played for the Palm Beach Central Broncos high school football team.

== College career ==
Bostic accepted an athletic scholarship to attend the University of Florida, where he played for coach Urban Meyer and coach Will Muschamp's Florida Gators football teams from 2009 to 2012. During his college career, he started 32 of 51 games in which he played, recording 237 tackles, 7.5 quarterback sacks and five interceptions. Following his senior season in 2012, he was a second-team All-Southeastern Conference (SEC) selection. Bostic graduated in 2012 with a Bachelor of Science degree in Health, Education and Behavior.

== Professional career ==
External videos
- Jon Bostic's NFL Combine Workout

Pre-draft measurables
Height	Weight	Arm length	Hand span	40-yard dash	10-yard split	20-yard split	20-yard shuttle	Three-cone drill	Vertical jump	Broad jump	Bench press
6 ft 0 7/8 in (1.85 m)	245 lb (111 kg)	33 in (0.84 m)	9 5/8 in (0.24 m)	4.61 s	1.59 s	2.67 s	4.24 s	6.99 s	32.5 in (0.83 m)	9 ft 10 in (3.00 m)	22 reps
All values from NFL Scouting Combine

=== Chicago Bears ===
==== 2013 ====
The Chicago Bears selected Bostic in the second round with the 50th overall pick in the 2013 NFL draft. Bostic was the seventh linebacker drafted in 2013.

External videos
- Bears draft Jon Bostic's 50th overall

On May 9, 2013, the Chicago Bears signed Bostic to a four-year, $3.94 million contract that includes a signing bonus of $1.24 million.

Throughout training camp, Bostic competed to be the starting middle linebacker against veteran D. J. Williams. Head coach Marc Trestman named Bostic the backup middle linebacker to begin the regular season, behind D. J. Williams.

He made his professional regular season debut in the Chicago Bears' season-opening 24–21 victory against the Cincinnati Bengals. The following week, Bostic recorded his first career regular season tackle on Cordarrelle Patterson during a 22-yard kick return in the second quarter of a 31–30 win against the Minnesota Vikings in Week 2. On October 11, 2013, it was reported that starting middle linebacker D. J. Williams was expected to miss the remainder of the season after tearing his pectoral muscle during the Bears' 26–21 victory against the New York Giants the previous day. Head coach Marc Trestman named Bostic the starter for the remainder of the season. On October 20, 2013, Bostic earned his first career start and recorded eight combined tackles in the Bears' 45–41 loss to the Washington Redskins in Week 7. In Week 11, he recorded five solo tackles, a pass deflection, and made his first career interception during a 23–20 overtime win against the Baltimore Ravens. He intercepted a pass by quarterback Joe Flacco that was intended for Dallas Clark in the second quarter. In Week 13, Bostic recorded a season-high ten combined tackles (six solo) and two sacks during a 23–20 overtime loss at the Minnesota Vikings. He made his first career sack on quarterback Matt Cassel for a three-yard loss in overtime. He finished his rookie season with a total of 57 combined tackles (45 solo), two sacks, a pass deflection, and an interception in 16 games and nine starts.

==== 2014 ====
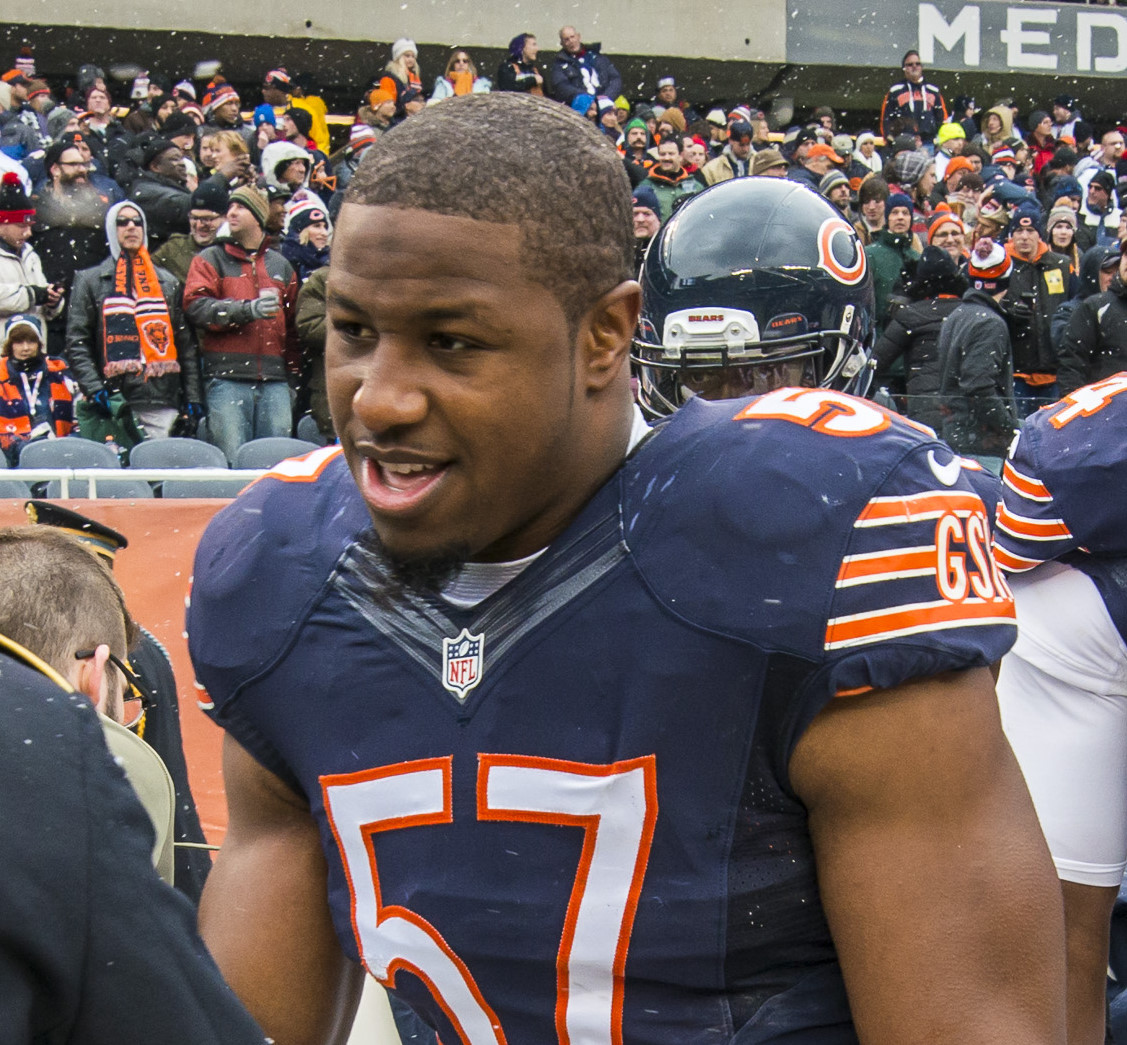
Bostic with the Bears in 2014

During training camp, Bostic and D. J. Williams competed against each other for the job as the starting middle linebacker. Defensive coordinator Mel Tucker named Bostic the backup middle linebacker to begin the regular season, behind D. J. Williams.

On September 22, 2014, Bostic earned his first start of the season in place of outside linebacker Shea McClellin. He recorded a season-high 13 combined tackles (six solo) during a 27–19 win at the New York Jets in Week 3. He started in place of McClellin in the next two games (Weeks 4–5). Bostic sustained a back injury and missed three consecutive games (Weeks 6–8). On November 27, 2014, Bostic started at middle linebacker in place of D. J. Williams who sustained a neck injury the previous week. He made 11 combined tackles (seven solo) in the Bears' 34–17 loss at the Detroit Lions in Week 13. He remained the starting middle linebacker for the last five games of the regular season after D. J. Williams was placed on injured reserve. Bostic finished the 2014 season with 84 combined tackles (58 solo) and three pass deflections in 13 games and eight starts. On December 29, 2014, the Chicago Bears fired head coach Mark Trestman and general manager Phil Emery after they finished with a 5–11 record.

==== 2015 ====
Bostic missed organized team activities due to a back injury, but recovered in time to attend training camp. Defensive coordinator Vic Fangio held a competition between Bostic, Christian Jones, and Mason Foster for a job as a starting inside linebacker. Head coach John Fox named Bostic the backup inside linebacker to start the regular season, behind Christian Jones, Shea McClellin, and Mason Foster. Bostic was a healthy scratch for the first three regular season games.

=== New England Patriots ===
On September 28, 2015, the Chicago Bears traded Bostic to the New England Patriots in exchange for a sixth-round pick (204th overall) in the 2016 NFL draft. Upon arriving to the New England Patriots, head coach Bill Belichick named Bostic the backup strongside linebacker behind Jamie Collins. On December 7, 2015, Bostic earned his first start as a member of the Patriots in place of Dont'a Hightower after Hightower sustained a shoulder injury. He recorded one tackle during a 27–6 victory at the Houston Texans in Week 14. He finished the 2015 season with two combined tackles (one solo) in 11 games and one start.

=== Detroit Lions ===
On May 9, 2016, the New England Patriots traded Bostic to the Detroit Lions in exchange for a conditional seventh-round draft pick. Throughout training camp, he competed against Stephen Tulloch for the job as the starting middle linebacker. On August 2, 2016, Bostic sustained a leg injury during a joint practice with the Pittsburgh Steelers. On September 6, 2016, the Detroit Lions placed Bostic on injured reserve with a foot injury. The Detroit Lions opted to keep him on injured reserve for the entire 2016 season.

=== Indianapolis Colts ===
On April 20, 2017, the Indianapolis Colts signed Bostic to a one-year, $690,000 contract. Throughout training camp, he competed for a job as a starting inside linebacker against Edwin Jackson and Sean Spence. Head coach Chuck Pagano named Bostic the starting inside linebacker to begin the 2017 regular season, along with rookie Antonio Morrison.

On October 1, 2017, Bostic recorded a season-high 12 combined tackles (five solo) during a 46–18 loss at the Seattle Seahawks in Week 4. In Week 8, he collected eight combined tackles and sacked quarterback Andy Dalton during the Colts' 24–23 loss at the Cincinnati Bengals. On December 18, 2017, the Indianapolis Colts placed Bostic on injured reserve after he suffered a knee injury in Week 15. He finished the 2017 season with a career-high 97 tackles (57 solo), three pass deflections, and a sack in 14 games and 14 starts. His 97 tackles finished third on the team and 25th among all players in the league. Pro Football Focus gave Bostic an overall grade of 74.9, ranking 38th among all qualified linebackers in 2017.

=== Pittsburgh Steelers ===
On March 18, 2018, the Pittsburgh Steelers signed Bostic to a two-year, $4 million contract that includes a signing bonus of $2.4 million. He was released from the team on April 27, 2019 following the 2019 NFL draft, in which the Steelers used the 10th overall pick on linebacker Devin Bush Jr.

=== Washington Redskins / Football Team ===
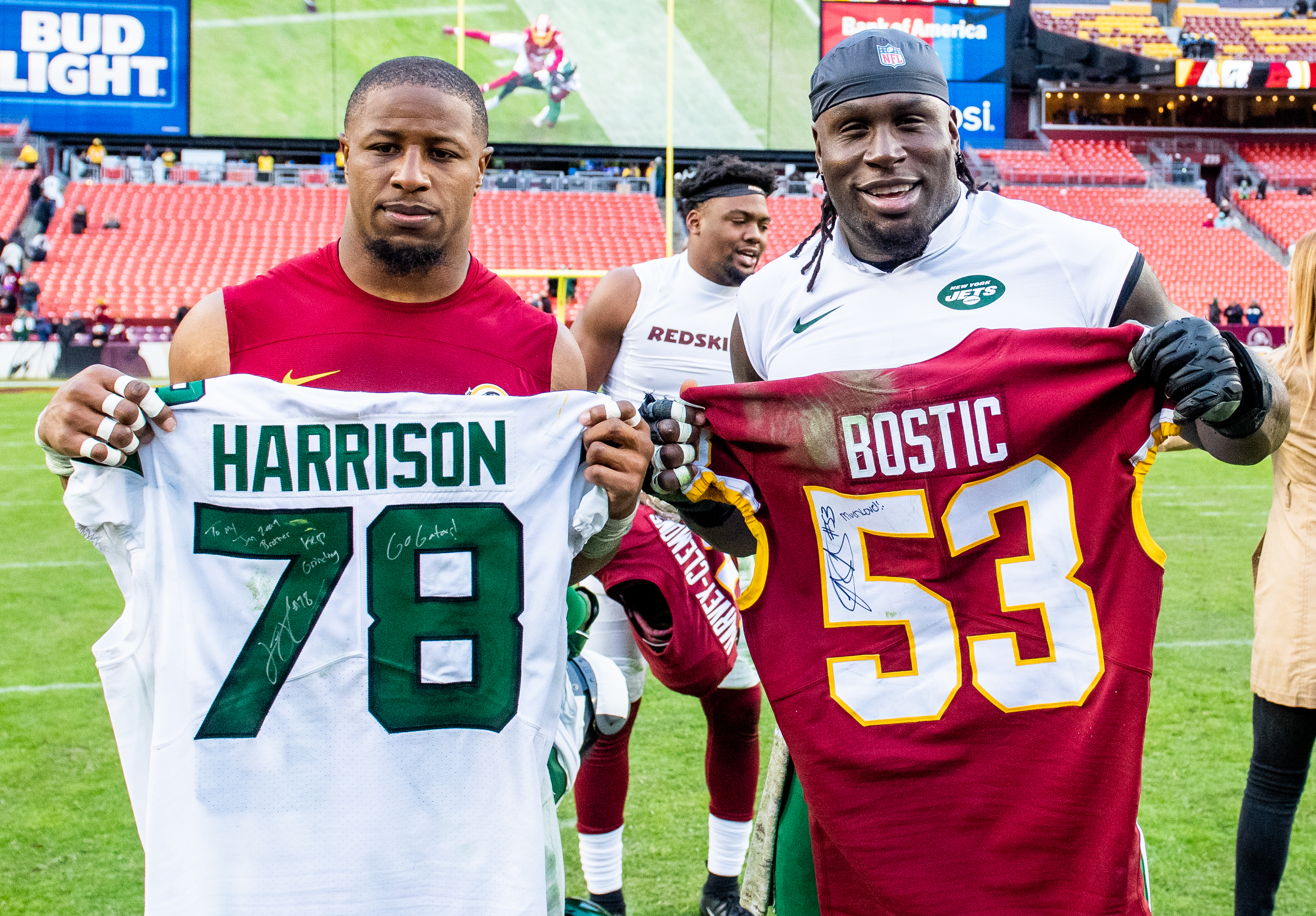
Bostic alongside Jonotthan Harrison in a game against the New York Jets

Bostic signed with the Washington Redskins on May 22, 2019, after linebacker Reuben Foster was placed on injured reserve with a torn ACL. He started all 16 games, recording a career-high 105 tackles, one sack, and an interception. On March 30, 2020, Bostic signed a two-year, $5 million contract extension with the Redskins.

In Week 7 of the 2020 season against the Dallas Cowboys, Bostic was ejected after initiating a helmet to helmet hit on Cowboys' quarterback Andy Dalton, giving him a concussion. He was later fined $12,000. In Week 13 against the Pittsburgh Steelers, Bostic led the team with 10 tackles and intercepted a pass thrown by former Steelers teammate Ben Roethlisberger during the 23–17 win.

Bostic tore a pectoral muscle in a Week 4 game against the Atlanta Falcons and was placed on injured reserve on October 5, 2021.

=== New Orleans Saints ===
Bostic signed with the New Orleans Saints on August 15, 2022. He was released on August 30, 2022.

=== Washington Commanders ===
Bostic signed a one-year contract with the Washington Commanders on September 1, 2022. He was placed on injured reserve on December 30, 2022.

== NFL career statistics ==
Legend
**Bold**	Career high

=== Regular season ===
Year	Team	Games		Tackles					Interceptions					Fumbles			
Year	Team	GP	GS	Cmb	Solo	Ast	Sck	TFL	Int	Yds	TD	Lng	PD	FF	FR	Yds	TD
2013	CHI	**16**	9	58	46	12	2.0	5	**1**	0	0	0	1	0	**1**	0	0
2014	CHI	13	8	84	58	26	0.0	4	0	0	0	0	**3**	0	0	0	0
2015	NWE	11	1	2	1	1	0.0	0	0	0	0	0	0	0	0	0	0
2017	IND	14	14	97	57	40	1.0	**6**	0	0	0	0	**3**	0	**1**	0	0
2018	PIT	**16**	14	73	46	27	2.5	5	0	0	0	0	**3**	0	0	0	0
2019	WAS	**16**	**16**	105	56	49	1.0	3	**1**	**26**	0	**26**	2	0	0	0	0
2020	WAS	**16**	15	**118**	**61**	**57**	**3.0**	**6**	**1**	0	0	0	**3**	0	0	0	0
2021	WAS	4	4	22	12	10	0.0	1	0	0	0	0	0	0	0	0	0
2022	WAS	15	5	25	11	14	0.0	0	0	0	0	0	0	0	0	0	0
Career		121	86	584	348	236	9.5	30	3	26	0	26	15	0	2	0	0

=== Playoffs ===
Year	Team	Games		Tackles					Interceptions					Fumbles			
Year	Team	GP	GS	Cmb	Solo	Ast	Sck	TFL	Int	Yds	TD	Lng	PD	FF	FR	Yds	TD
2020	WAS	**1**	**1**	**7**	**4**	**3**	0.0	0	0	0	0	0	**1**	0	**1**	0	0
Career		1	1	7	4	3	0.0	0	0	0	0	0	1	0	1	0	0
