= Victor Hampton (American football) =

American gridiron football player (born 1992)

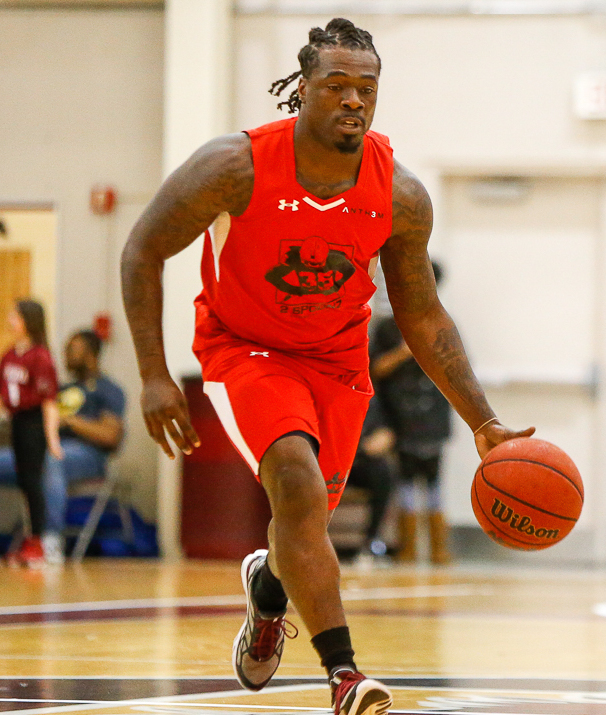
- Hampton playing basketball in a 2019 celebrity charity tournament.

Profile
- Position: Cornerback

Personal information
- Born: March 12, 1992 (age 34); Charlotte, North Carolina, U.S.
- Listed height: 5 ft 9 in (1.75 m)
- Listed weight: 197 lb (89 kg)

Career information
- High school: Darlington (SC)
- College: South Carolina
- NFL draft: 2014: undrafted

Career history
- Cincinnati Bengals (2014)*; New York Giants (2014)*; Baltimore Ravens (2015)*; Montreal Alouettes (2016)*; Iowa Barnstormers (2024)
- * Offseason or practice squad member only

Awards and highlights
- Second-team All-SEC (2013)
- Stats at Pro Football Reference

Victor Hampton (born March 12, 1992) is an American football cornerback. He played college football at South Carolina, and has been a member of the Cincinnati Bengals, New York Giants, and Baltimore Ravens.

== Early life ==
He moved to Darlington, South Carolina to play his senior season at Darlington High School, after being dismissed from Independence High School in Charlotte, North Carolina. He recorded 50 tackles and three interceptions as a senior, and also scored six touchdowns on offense despite only playing in six games due to eligibility issues following his transfer. At Independence, he had 50 tackles and 10 interceptions as a junior. He played in the U.S. Army All-American Bowl in San Antonio, Texas.

Considered a four-star recruit by Rivals.com, he was rated as the 6th best cornerback prospect in the nation. He accepted a scholarship offer from South Carolina over offers from Florida, North Carolina, and Tennessee.

== College career ==
Hampton redshirted as a true freshman. In 2011, he played in 10 games, recording 14 tackles, one interception and three pass breakups. He also returned kicks, averaging 25.4 yards on seven kickoffs. In 2012, he played in all 13 games, recording 40 tackles, one interception and tied for the team high with six pass breakups. In 2013, he started all 13 games, setting career highs in tackles (51), tackles for loss (5), interceptions (3) and pass break ups (9).

Following the season, Hampton decided to forgo his remaining eligibility and enter the 2014 NFL draft.

== Professional career ==
Hampton was not selected in the 2014 NFL draft.

He was signed as an undrafted free agent by the Bengals on June 10, 2014, but was later cut. On October 14, 2014, he signed with the New York Giants, becoming a member of their practice squad.

He signed with the Baltimore Ravens in January 2015, and was released on March 2 after being arrested for driving under the influence.

Hampton was drafted 30th overall in the 2016 Major League Football draft in the fourth round.

He participated in The Spring League Showcase game in July 2017.
