= Akeem Auguste =

American football player (born 1989)

No. 36
- Position: Cornerback

Personal information
- Born: October 3, 1989 (age 37); Hollywood, Florida, U.S.
- Listed height: 5 ft 10 in (1.78 m)
- Listed weight: 185 lb (84 kg)

Career information
- College: South Carolina
- NFL draft: 2013: undrafted

Career history
- Cleveland Browns (2013)*; Seattle Seahawks (2013–2014)*
- * Offseason or practice squad member only

Awards and highlights
- Super Bowl champion (XLVIII)
- Stats at Pro Football Reference

Akeem Auguste (born October 3, 1989) is an American former professional football player who was a cornerback in the National Football League (NFL). He played college football for the South Carolina Gamecocks. Auguste was signed by the Cleveland Browns as an undrafted free agent in 2013. He won a Super Bowl ring with the Seattle Seahawks against the Denver Broncos in Super Bowl XLVIII.

== Early life ==
Auguste attended Chaminade-Madonna High School. He was ranked as the 28th-best prospect in the state of Florida and as the 14th-best overall cornerback in the country by Rivals.com. He was selected to the first-team twice in high school.

== Professional career ==
On May 13, 2013, Auguste signed with the Cleveland Browns as an undrafted free agent. On August 31, 2013, he was released.

On November 27, 2013, Auguste signed with the Seattle Seahawks to join practice squad. He was released by the Seahawks on August 30, 2014.
