= Ace Sanders =

American football player (born 1991)

No. 18
- Position: Wide receiver

Personal information
- Born: November 11, 1991 (age 34); Palmetto, Florida, U.S.
- Listed height: 5 ft 7 in (1.70 m)
- Listed weight: 178 lb (81 kg)

Career information
- High school: Manatee (Bradenton, Florida)
- College: South Carolina (2010–2012)
- NFL draft: 2013: 4th round, 101st overall pick

Career history
- Jacksonville Jaguars (2013–2014)

Awards and highlights
- Second-team All-SEC (2012); SEC Special Teams Player of the Year (2012)

Career NFL statistics
- Receptions: 57
- Receiving yards: 539
- Return yards: 458
- Total touchdowns: 1
- Stats at Pro Football Reference

Tracy Lavon "Ace" Sanders (born November 11, 1991) is an American former professional football player who was a wide receiver in the National Football League (NFL). He was selected by the Jacksonville Jaguars in the fourth round of the 2013 NFL draft. He played college football for the South Carolina Gamecocks.

== Early life ==
Sanders was born in Palmetto, Florida. He played high school football for Manatee High School in Bradenton. He is the son of former Florida State Seminoles cornerback Tracy Sanders.

In addition to football, Sanders also ran track and field. He placed second in the 100 meters at the 2010 FHSAA 3A District 11 Championships, setting a career-best time of 10.98 seconds. He also competed in the long jump, he had a career-best jump of 6.95 meters.

== College career ==
Sanders received an athletic scholarship to attend the University of South Carolina, where he played for coach Steve Spurrier's South Carolina Gamecocks football team from 2010 to 2012. As a junior in 2012, he was a first-team All-Southeastern Conference (SEC) selection as a kick returner, and was named SEC Special Teams Player of the Year. In the 2013 Outback Bowl against the Michigan Wolverines, he caught a career-best nine passes for 92 yards and two touchdowns, scored on a 63-yard punt return, and was named the game's most valuable player (MVP).

== Professional career ==
Pre-draft measurables
Height	Weight	Arm length	Hand span	40-yard dash	10-yard split	20-yard split	20-yard shuttle	Three-cone drill	Vertical jump	Broad jump	Bench press
5 ft 7 in (1.70 m)	173 lb (78 kg)	29 1/2 in (0.75 m)	8 7/8 in (0.23 m)	4.55 s	1.51 s	2.65 s	4.37 s	6.81 s	32 in (0.81 m)	9 ft 9 in (2.97 m)	7 reps
All values from NFL Combine/South Carolina Pro Day.

The Jacksonville Jaguars chose Sanders in the fourth round, with the 101st overall pick, of the 2013 NFL draft. He registered his first career reception in Week 1 against the Kansas City Chiefs. His first career punt return came in Week 4 against the Indianapolis Colts.

On December 5, 2013, in a Thursday Night Football game against the Houston Texans, Sanders threw a 21-yard touchdown pass to running back Jordan Todman on a trick screen play. The Jaguars went on to win the game, 27–20. On December 15, he scored his first touchdown reception against the Buffalo Bills.

Sanders finished his rookie season with 484 receiving yards on 51 catches with one touchdown, one pass for 21 yards and a touchdown, three kick returns for 140 yards, 25 for 140 yards on punt returns (with 16 fair catches) all in 15 out of the 16 regular season games.

Sanders was suspended for the first four games of the 2014 season for violating the NFL's substance abuse policy. He was re-activated on October 4, 2014, ahead of the Jaguars' Week 5 matchup against the Pittsburgh Steelers. Overall, he had six receptions for 55 yards in the 2014 season.

On July 17, 2015, Sanders was waived by the Jaguars.
