= Justice Cunningham =

American football player (born 1991)

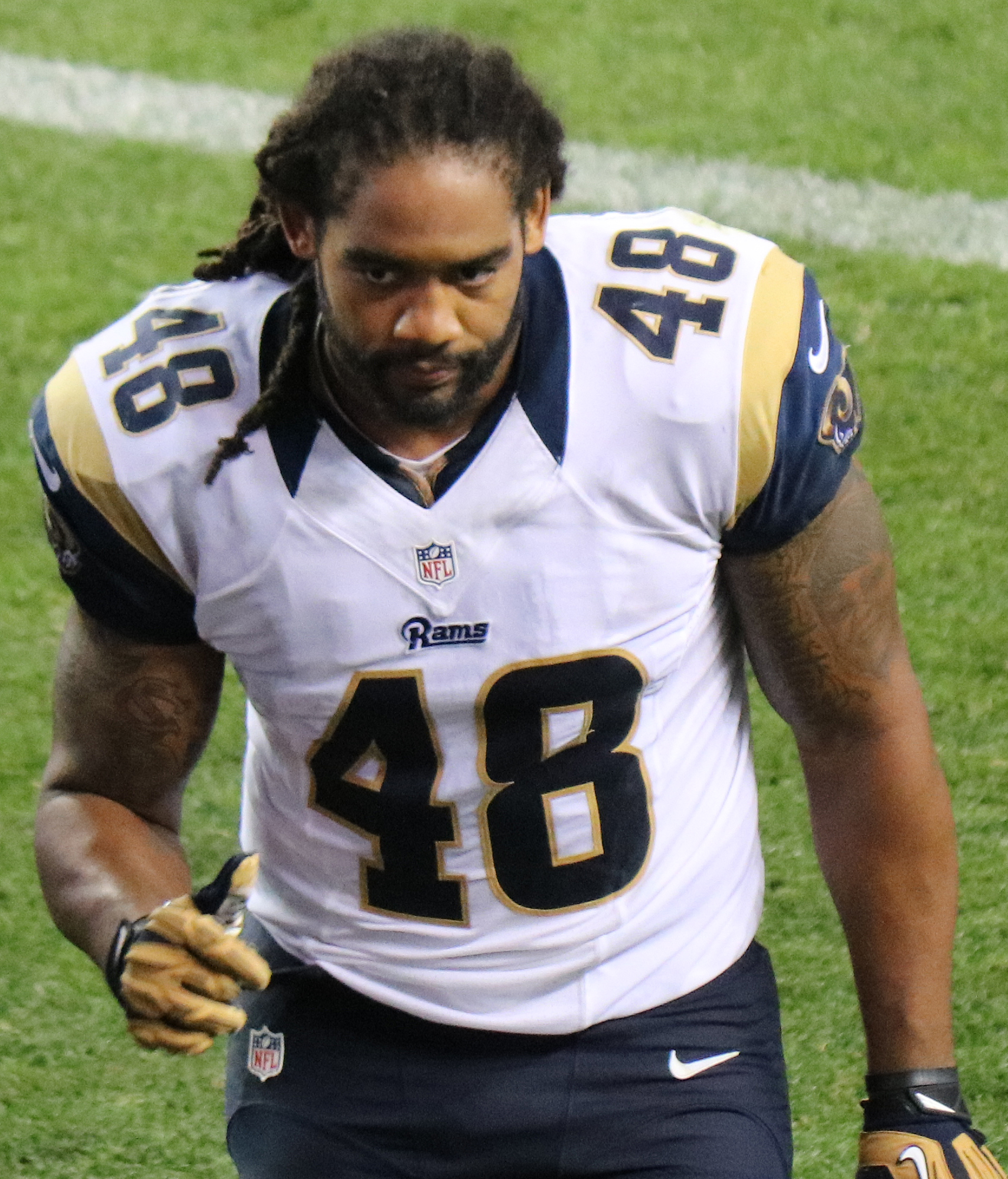
- Cunningham with the Los Angeles Rams in 2016

No. 48, 86
- Position: Tight end

Personal information
- Born: January 14, 1991 (age 35); Pageland, South Carolina, U.S.
- Listed height: 6 ft 3 in (1.91 m)
- Listed weight: 258 lb (117 kg)

Career information
- High school: Central (Pageland)
- College: South Carolina
- NFL draft: 2013: 7th round, 254th overall pick

Career history
- Indianapolis Colts (2013); St. Louis Rams (2013–2015)

Career NFL statistics
- Receptions: 1
- Receiving yards: 4
- Stats at Pro Football Reference

Justice Cunningham (born January 14, 1991) is an American former professional football player who was a tight end in the National Football League (NFL). He played college football for the South Carolina Gamecocks. In the 2013 NFL draft, he was the 254th and last player to be drafted, making Cunningham the year's Mr. Irrelevant. Cunningham was the second consecutive Mr. Irrelevant for the Indianapolis Colts, who chose Chandler Harnish as the last pick of 2012 NFL draft.

== Early life ==
Cunningham graduated from Central High School (Pageland, South Carolina) in 2009. While there, he collected his fair share of accolades. His senior year, he helped Central reach the 2008 Class AA state finals and a 14–1 record while playing tight end and defensive end. This same year, he collected 20 sacks. His efforts landed him a spot on the All-State First-team, the 2008 Shrine Bowl of the Carolinas, and on PrepStar's All-Atlantic Region Team. As a junior, he caught 21 passes for 400 yards and 8 touchdowns. On defense, he registered 92 tackles, seven sacks, two interceptions, and three fumble recoveries. He also excelled on the basketball court averaging 12 points and 11 rebounds his junior year.

== Professional career ==
=== Indianapolis Colts ===
Cunningham had the "honor" of being Mr. Irrelevant in the 2013 NFL draft, being the 254th, and last player selected in the draft. On September 2, 2013, he was waived. On September 3, 2013, he was signed to the practice squad. On November 19, 2013, he was promoted to the active roster. He played his first regular season game on November 24, 2013 against Arizona. Cunningham had one catch for four yards. On November 26, 2013, he was waived.

=== St. Louis / Los Angeles Rams ===
On November 28, 2013, Cunningham was signed to the practice squad. On December 31, 2013, he was signed a future contract.

On September 1, 2014, he was placed on injured reserve. On September 2, 2014, he was waived from injured reserve. On October 29, 2014, Cunningham was signed to the practice squad. On November 25, 2014, he was promoted to the active roster.

On September 5, 2015, he was waived and was signed to the practice squad the next day. On October 15, 2015, he was promoted to the active roster. On November 28, 2015, he was waived. On December 1, 2015, he was re-signed to the practice squad.

On September 3, 2016, Cunningham was waived by the Rams as part of final roster cuts.
