= Mr. Football (South Carolina) =

High school football award

The South Carolina Mr. Football award is an honor given to the top high school football player in the state of South Carolina. Past winners have often proceeded to have successful college careers and even play in the National Football League (NFL).

== Award winners ==
Professional teams listed are teams known.

Year	Player	Position	High school	College	Professional team(s)
1991	Jumpity Springster	RB	Stratford	South Carolina	
1992	Stephen Davis	RB	Spartanburg	Auburn	Washington Redskins, Carolina Panthers, St. Louis Rams
1993	Jeff Coleman	DT	Gaffney	Tennessee	CFL - Montreal Alouettes
1994	Anthony Downs	RB	Berea	Clemson	
1995	Jermale Kelley	WR	Berea	South Carolina	NFL Europe - Berlin, Rhein
1996	Kyle Young	OL	Daniel	Clemson	
1997	Chris Hope	DB	Rock Hill	Florida State	Pittsburgh Steelers, Tennessee Titans
1998	Derek Watson	RB	Palmetto	South Carolina	Tampa Bay Buccaneers, Calgary Stampeders
1999	Mark Logan	QB	Greenwood	Georgia Tech	
2000	Roscoe Crosby	WR	Union	Clemson	
2001	Moe Thompson	DE	Stratford	South Carolina	
2002	Eric McCollom	QB	Camden	Iowa	
2003	Trey Elder	QB	Byrnes	Appalachian State	
2004	J.D. Melton	QB	Myrtle Beach	Navy	
2005	Prince Miller	DB	Byrnes	Georgia	Baltimore Ravens, Detroit Lions, Indianapolis Colts, Cleveland Browns, Saskatchewan Roughriders
2006	Malcolm Long	QB	Gaffney	South Carolina State	
2007	Richard Mounce	QB	Blythewood	Clemson**/Charleston Southern	
2008	Stephon Gilmore	CB	South Pointe	South Carolina	Buffalo Bills, New England Patriots Carolina Panthers Indianapolis Colts Dallas Cowboys
2009	Marcus Lattimore	RB	Byrnes	South Carolina	San Francisco 49ers
2010	Jadeveon Clowney	DE	South Pointe	South Carolina	Houston Texans, Seattle Seahawks, Tennessee Titans, Cleveland Browns, Baltimore Ravens, Carolina Panthers
2011	Shaq Roland	WR	Lexington	South Carolina / West Georgia	Chicago Bears
2012	Tramel Terry	WR	Goose Creek	Georgia / Jacksonville State	
2013	Jacob Park	QB	Stratford	Georgia / Iowa State	
2014	Matt Colburn	RB	Dutch Fork	Wake Forest	Los Angeles Rams
2015	Tavien Feaster	RB	Spartanburg	Clemson/South Carolina	Arizona Cardinals
2016	Gage Moloney	QB	Northwestern	James Madison	
2017	Dakereon Joyner	QB	Fort Dorchester	South Carolina	
2018	Zacch Pickens	DE	TL Hanna	South Carolina	Chicago Bears
2019	Luke Doty	QB	Myrtle Beach	South Carolina	
2020	Tyrion Ingram-Dawkins	DL	Gaffney	Georgia	Minnesota Vikings
2021	Jaylen Sneed	LB	Hilton Head Island	Notre Dame	
2022	Xzavier McLeod	DL	Camden	South Carolina/Georgia	
2023	Josiah Thompson	OL	Dillon	South Carolina	
2024	Will Wilson	QB	Richland Northeast	NC State	
2025	Tamarion Watkins	S	Northwestern	Texas A&M	

**baseball only. After one season of Tiger baseball, Mounce transferred to Charleston Southern to play football.
