= List of school districts in South Carolina =

This is a list of school districts in South Carolina, sorted alphabetically.

There are countywide school districts (which each cover all of a county) and independent school districts (which cover parts of one or more counties). All school districts are independent governments, and no K-12 public school systems in the state are dependent on another layer of government.

== A ==
- Abbeville County School District
- Aiken County Public School District
- Allendale County School District
- Anderson County School District 1
- Anderson County School District 2
- Anderson County School District 3
- Anderson County School District 4
- Anderson County School District 5

== B ==
- Bamberg School District
- Barnwell County Auditory-Verbal Center
- Barnwell County School District 19
- Barnwell County School District 29
- Barnwell County School District 45
- Beaufort County School District
- Beaufort-Jasper Career
- Berkeley County School District

== C ==
- Calhoun County School District
- Charleston County School District
- Charter Institute at Erskine
- Cherokee County School District
- Chester County School District
- Chesterfield County School District
- Clarendon County School District 1
- Clarendon County School District 2 (Manning)
- Clarendon County School District 3 (Turbeville)
- Colleton County School District
- Cope Auditory-Verbal Center

== D ==
- Darlington
- Dillon 3 (Latta)
- Dillon 4 (Dillon/Lake View)
- Dorchester 2
- Dorchester 4

== E ==
- Edgefield County School District

== F ==
- Fairfield
- Florence 1 (South and West Florence)
- Florence 2 (Pamlico)
- Florence 3 (Lake City)
- Florence 4 (Timmonsville)
- Florence 5 (Johnsonville)

== G ==
- Georgetown
- Greenville
- Greenwood 50 (Greenwood)
- Greenwood 51 (Ware Shoals)
- Greenwood 52 (Ninety Six)

== H ==
- Hampton 1 (Hampton)
- Hampton 2 (Estill)
- Horry

== J ==
- Jasper

== K ==
- Kershaw

== L ==
- Lancaster
- Laurens 55 (Laurens)
- Laurens 56 (Clinton)
- Lee
- Lexington 1 (Gilbert, Lexington, Pelion)
- Lexington 2 (Cayce, Springdale, West Columbia)
- Lexington 3 (Batesburg-Leesville)
- Lexington 4 (Gaston & Swansea)
- Lexington-Richland 5 (Chapin, Irmo, St. Andrews)

== M ==
- Marion County School District
- Marlboro
- McCormick

== N ==
- Newberry

== O ==
- Oconee
- Orangeburg Consolidated 3 (Elloree, Holly Hill)
- Orangeburg Consolidated 4 (Branchville, Cordova, Cope)
- Orangeburg Consolidated 5 (Bowman, North, Orangeburg)

== P ==
- Pickens

== R ==
- Richland 1 (Columbia)
- Richland 2 (NE Columbia, Spring Valley)
- Richland-Lexington 5 - see Lexington-Richland 5

== S ==
- Saluda
- South Carolina Public Charter School District
- Spartanburg County School District 1 (Campobello, Inman, Landrum)
- Spartanburg County School District 2 (Boiling Springs, Chesnee, Inman, Mayo)
- Spartanburg County School District 3 (Cowpens, Pacolet, Spartanburg)
- Spartanburg County School District 4 (Woodruff)
- Spartanburg County School District 5 (Duncan, Lyman, Wellford, Reidville, Moore)
- Spartanburg County School District 6 (Moore, Pauline, Roebuck, Spartanburg)
- Spartanburg County School District 7 (Spartanburg Downtown/East)
- Sumter 2 (outer Sumter County)
- Sumter 17 (central Sumter County)

== U ==
- Union

== W ==
- Williamsburg

== Y ==
- York 1 (York)
- York 2 (Clover)
- York 3 (Rock Hill)
- York 4 (Fort Mill)
