= J'Zavien Currence =

American football player (born 2007)

No. 14 – South Carolina Gamecocks
- Position: Safety
- Class: Freshman

Personal information
- Born: December 7, 2007 (age 18)
- Listed height: 6 ft 4 in (1.93 m)
- Listed weight: 215 lb (98 kg)

Career information
- High school: South Pointe (Rock Hill, South Carolina)
- College: South Carolina (2026–present)
- Stats at ESPN

J'Zavien Currence (born December 7, 2007) is an American college football safety for the South Carolina Gamecocks.

== Early life ==
Currence played football from a young age, saying he "scored like 30 touchdowns in one season". He also grew up training with his father.

Currence attended South Pointe High School in Rock Hill, South Carolina, where he played high school football for the Stallions. He variously lined up at quarterback, wide receiver, safety, and nickelback. As a freshman, Currence recorded 36 tackles and played in the 2022 FBU Freshman All-American Bowl. As a sophomore, he registered 67 tackles, 12 pass breakups, and five interceptions, earning all-state Class 4A honors from the South Carolina Football Coaches Association (SCFCA) and sophomore All-American honors by MaxPreps.

As a junior, Currence posted 1,030 yards of total offense and nine touchdowns (five receiving, four rushing) to go with 42 tackles, 16 pass breakups, and two interceptions. As a senior, he passed for 2,782 yards and 24 touchdowns and rushed for 1,621 yards and 20 touchdowns while tallying 87 total tackles, 23 pass breakups, four interceptions, and one forced fumble on defense. Currence was named the team's starting quarterback in the second half of their season opener. He led South Pointe to a 14–1 record and the Class 4A state championship, scoring two rushing touchdowns in a 35–14 win over South Florence High School in the state title game. Currence was named the South Carolina Player of the Year by Gatorade, MaxPreps, and Prep RedZone, and was a finalist for the South Carolina Mr. Football award. He earned all-class all-state team honors from the SCFCA and second-team All-American honors from MaxPreps, as well as invites to the Shrine Bowl of the Carolinas, the Polynesian Bowl, and the Navy All-American Bowl. Outside of football, he also participated in basketball and track.

=== Recruiting ===
Currence was rated as a consensus four-star recruit. He was ranked as the third-best safety prospect in the class of 2026 by Rivals.com. Currence received multiple offers before entering high school. He received over 40 college offers in total. On October 17, 2024, Currence committed to playing college football at the University of South Carolina. He reaffirmed his pledge after a June 2025 visit to campus, and officially signed with the Gamecocks during the early signing period in December.

== College career ==
Currence enrolled at South Carolina in January 2026. He impressed at spring practices, and competed for a starting job at safety.

== Personal life ==
Currence grew up as a fan of the Florida Gators. His father, Jay, played college football for the Northwestern Wildcats as a wide receiver.
