= Josiah Thompson (American football) =

American football player (born 2006)

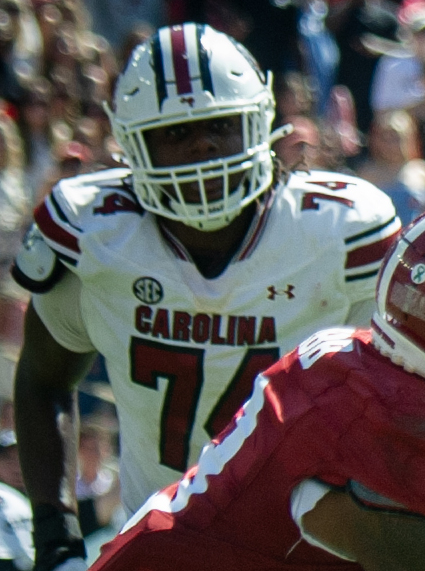
- Thompson in 2024

No. 74 – South Carolina Gamecocks
- Position: Offensive tackle
- Class: Junior

Personal information
- Born: April 22, 2006 (age 20)
- Listed height: 6 ft 7 in (2.01 m)
- Listed weight: 305 lb (138 kg)

Career information
- High school: Dillon (Dillon, South Carolina)
- College: South Carolina (2024–present)

Awards and highlights
- Mr. Football Award (South Carolina) (2023); SEC All-Freshman Team (2024); Freshman All-American (2024)
- Stats at ESPN

Josiah Thompson (born April 22, 2006) is an American college football offensive tackle for the South Carolina Gamecocks.

== Early life ==
Thompson was born on April 22, 2006, and grew up in Dillon, South Carolina. He attended Dillon High School, where he played football as an offensive tackle and basketball. He was a three-year starter on the football team and did not allow a single sack during that time. He was named all-state, to the Shrine Bowl, and the All-American Bowl. He was also named All-American by MaxPreps, the Class 3A Lower State Defensive Lineman of the Year, the recipient of the South Carolina Football Hall of Fame's Bridge Builder Excellence Award, and was named the winner of the 2023 South Carolina Mr. Football Award. He became one of only two offensive linemen all-time to receive the South Carolina Mr. Football Award. A five-star recruit and a top-20 player nationally in the 2024 recruiting class, he committed to play college football for the South Carolina Gamecocks.

== College career ==
Thompson started 12 games as a true freshman for South Carolina in 2024, being named a Freshman All-American and to the Freshman All-Southeastern Conference (SEC) team.
