= Steven Gilmore Jr. =

American football player (born 1999)

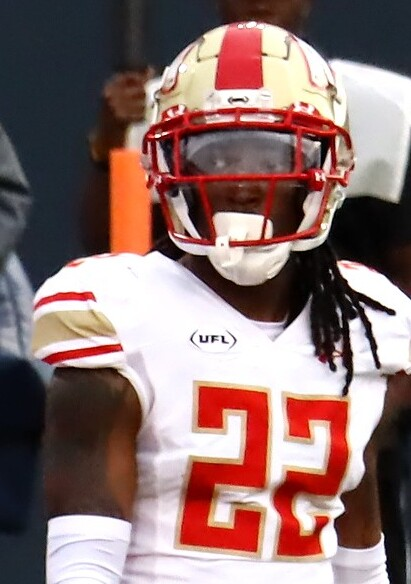
- Gilmore with the Birmingham Stallions in 2025

Profile
- Position: Cornerback

Personal information
- Born: September 17, 1999 (age 27); Rock Hill, South Carolina, U.S.
- Listed height: 5 ft 9 in (1.75 m)
- Listed weight: 170 lb (77 kg)

Career information
- High school: South Pointe (Rock Hill, South Carolina)
- College: Marshall (2018–2022)
- NFL draft: 2023: undrafted

Career history
- Detroit Lions (2023); Birmingham Stallions (2025); Arizona Cardinals (2025)*; Birmingham Stallions (2026); Los Angeles Rams (2026)*
- * Offseason or practice squad member only

Awards and highlights
- Second-team All-Sun Belt (2022); Second-team All-C-USA (2021)
- Stats at Pro Football Reference

Steven Gilmore Jr. (born September 17, 1999) is an American professional football cornerback. He played college football for the Marshall Thundering Herd and signed with the Detroit Lions as an undrafted free agent after the 2023 NFL draft.

== Professional career ==
Pre-draft measurables
Height	Weight	Arm length	Hand span	Wingspan	40-yard dash	10-yard split	20-yard split	Vertical jump	Broad jump	Bench press
5 ft 8 7/8 in (1.75 m)	174 lb (79 kg)	29 3/4 in (0.76 m)	8 1/2 in (0.22 m)	6 ft 1 in (1.85 m)	4.44 s	1.56 s	2.49 s	36.5 in (0.93 m)	10 ft 4 in (3.15 m)	12 reps
All values from Pro Day

=== Detroit Lions ===
On May 12, 2023, the Detroit Lions signed Gilmore to a three-year, $2.71 million contract as an undrafted free agent. He made the initial 53-man roster on August 29.

On August 27, 2024, Gilmore was waived by the Lions.

=== Birmingham Stallions ===
On January 16, 2025, Gilmore signed with the Birmingham Stallions of the United Football League (UFL).

=== Arizona Cardinals ===
On July 27, 2025, Gilmore signed with the Arizona Cardinals of the National Football League (NFL). He was waived on August 25.

=== Los Angeles Rams ===
On August 24, 2026, Gilmore signed with the Los Angeles Rams. He was waived by Los Angeles on August 29 as a part of preliminary roster cuts.

== Personal life ==
Gilmore is the younger brother of NFL cornerback Stephon Gilmore.
