= Robbie Ouzts =

American football player (born 2002)

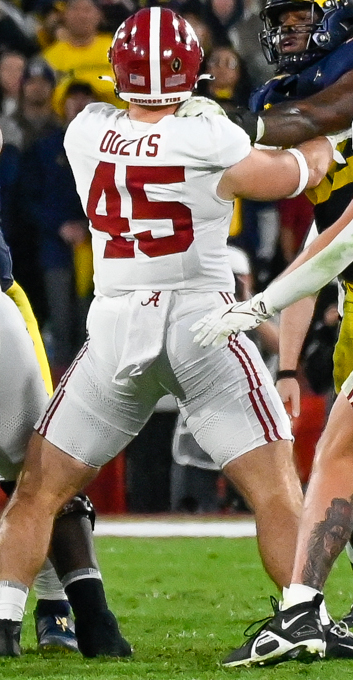
- Ouzts in 2024

No. 40 – Seattle Seahawks
- Position: Fullback
- Roster status: Injured reserve

Personal information
- Born: September 6, 2002 (age 24)
- Listed height: 6 ft 3 in (1.91 m)
- Listed weight: 274 lb (124 kg)

Career information
- High school: Rock Hill (Rock Hill, South Carolina)
- College: Alabama (2021–2024)
- NFL draft: 2025: 5th round, 175th overall pick

Career history
- Seattle Seahawks (2025–present)

Awards and highlights
- Super Bowl champion (LX)
- Stats at Pro Football Reference

Robbie Ouzts (OOTS; born September 6, 2002) is an American professional football fullback for the Seattle Seahawks of the National Football League (NFL). He played college football for the Alabama Crimson Tide and was selected by the Seahawks in the fifth round of the 2025 NFL draft.

== Early life ==
Ouzts attended Rock Hill High School. As a junior, he hauled in 32 passes for 456 yards while also playing for the basketball team as a power forward. Coming out of high school, Ouzts was rated as a three-star recruit and committed to play college football for the Alabama Crimson Tide.

== College career ==
In 2021, Ouzts made one catch for eight yards in 11 games played. In 2022, he played in 13 games with three starts, where he hauled in four receptions for 43 yards. In 2024, Ouzts tallied three catches for 33 yards and a touchdown. In week 12 of the 2024 season, he hauled in a 44-yard touchdown reception in a victory over Mercer. In the 2024 ReliaQuest Bowl, Ouzts brought in a 25-yard touchdown in a loss to Michigan. He finished the 2024 season with 108 receiving yards and two touchdowns. After the season, Ouzts declared for the 2025 NFL draft, while also accepting an invite to participate in the 2025 NFL Scouting Combine. Ouzts finished his college career at Alabama with 16 receptions for 192 yards and 3 touchdowns.

== Professional career ==
Pre-draft measurables
Height	Weight	Arm length	Hand span	Wingspan	40-yard dash	10-yard split	20-yard split	20-yard shuttle	Three-cone drill	Vertical jump	Broad jump	Bench press
6 ft 3 in (1.91 m)	274 lb (124 kg)	31 1/4 in (0.79 m)	9 3/4 in (0.25 m)	6 ft 6 1/4 in (1.99 m)	4.91 s	1.64 s	2.88 s	4.45 s	7.34 s	34 in (0.86 m)	9 ft 11 in (3.02 m)	26 reps
All values from NFL Combine

Ouzts was selected by the Seattle Seahawks with the 175th pick in the fifth round of the 2025 NFL draft. Instead of being drafted as his collegiate position of tight end, Ouzts was drafted by the Seahawks as a fullback and designated as a fullback on their official roster. He suffered an ankle injury in Week 3 against the New Orleans Saints, and was placed on injured reserve on September 24. Ouzts was activated on November 1, ahead of the team's Week 9 matchup against the Washington Commanders. Ouzts became a Super Bowl champion when the Seahawks defeated the New England Patriots 29–13 in Super Bowl LX.

Ouzts was placed on injured reserve on August 11, 2026 with a neck injury.
