= Jadeveon Clowney =

American football player (born 1993)

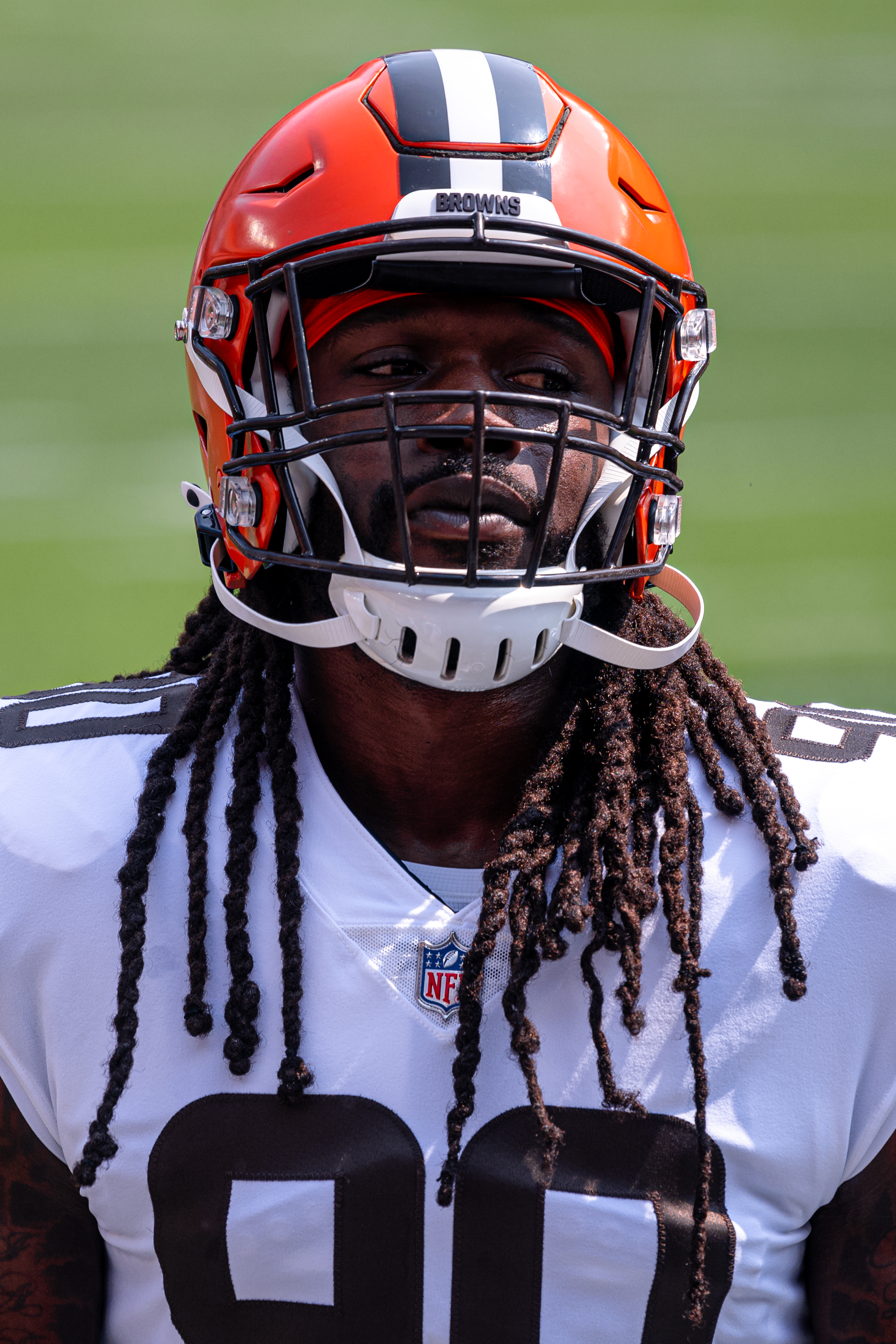
- Clowney with the Cleveland Browns in 2021

No. 90 – Houston Texans
- Position: Defensive end
- Roster status: Active

Personal information
- Born: February 14, 1993 (age 33); Rock Hill, South Carolina, U.S.
- Listed height: 6 ft 5 in (1.96 m)
- Listed weight: 266 lb (121 kg)

Career information
- High school: South Pointe (Rock Hill)
- College: South Carolina (2011–2013)
- NFL draft: 2014: 1st round, 1st overall pick

Career history
- Houston Texans (2014–2018); Seattle Seahawks (2019); Tennessee Titans (2020); Cleveland Browns (2021–2022); Baltimore Ravens (2023); Carolina Panthers (2024); Dallas Cowboys (2025); Houston Texans (2026–present)

Awards and highlights
- Second-team All-Pro (2016); 3× Pro Bowl (2016–2018); Ted Hendricks Award (2012); SEC Defensive Player of the Year (2012); 2× First-team All-American (2012, 2013); 2× First-team All-SEC (2012, 2013); Second-team All-SEC (2011); SEC Freshman of the Year (2011); South Carolina Gamecocks No. 7 retired

Career NFL statistics as of Week 11, 2026
- Total tackles: 468
- Sacks: 72.0
- Forced fumbles: 16
- Fumble recoveries: 11
- Interceptions: 1
- Pass deflections: 38
- Defensive touchdowns: 4
- Stats at Pro Football Reference

Jadeveon Davarus Clowney (/dʒəˈdɛviɒn/ jə-DEV-ee-on; born February 14, 1993) is an American professional football defensive end for the Houston Texans of the National Football League (NFL). He played college football for the South Carolina Gamecocks, winning the Ted Hendricks Award and SEC Defensive Player of the Year in 2012, along with earning consecutive first-team All-American honors between 2012 and 2013.

Clowney was selected first overall in the 2014 NFL draft by the Texans, where he spent his first five seasons. During his final three seasons with the Texans, Clowney received three consecutive Pro Bowl selections and one second-team All-Pro honor. Following his departure from Houston, he played with the Seattle Seahawks, Tennessee Titans, Cleveland Browns, Baltimore Ravens, Carolina Panthers, and Dallas Cowboys. He returned to the Texans in 2026.

== Early life ==
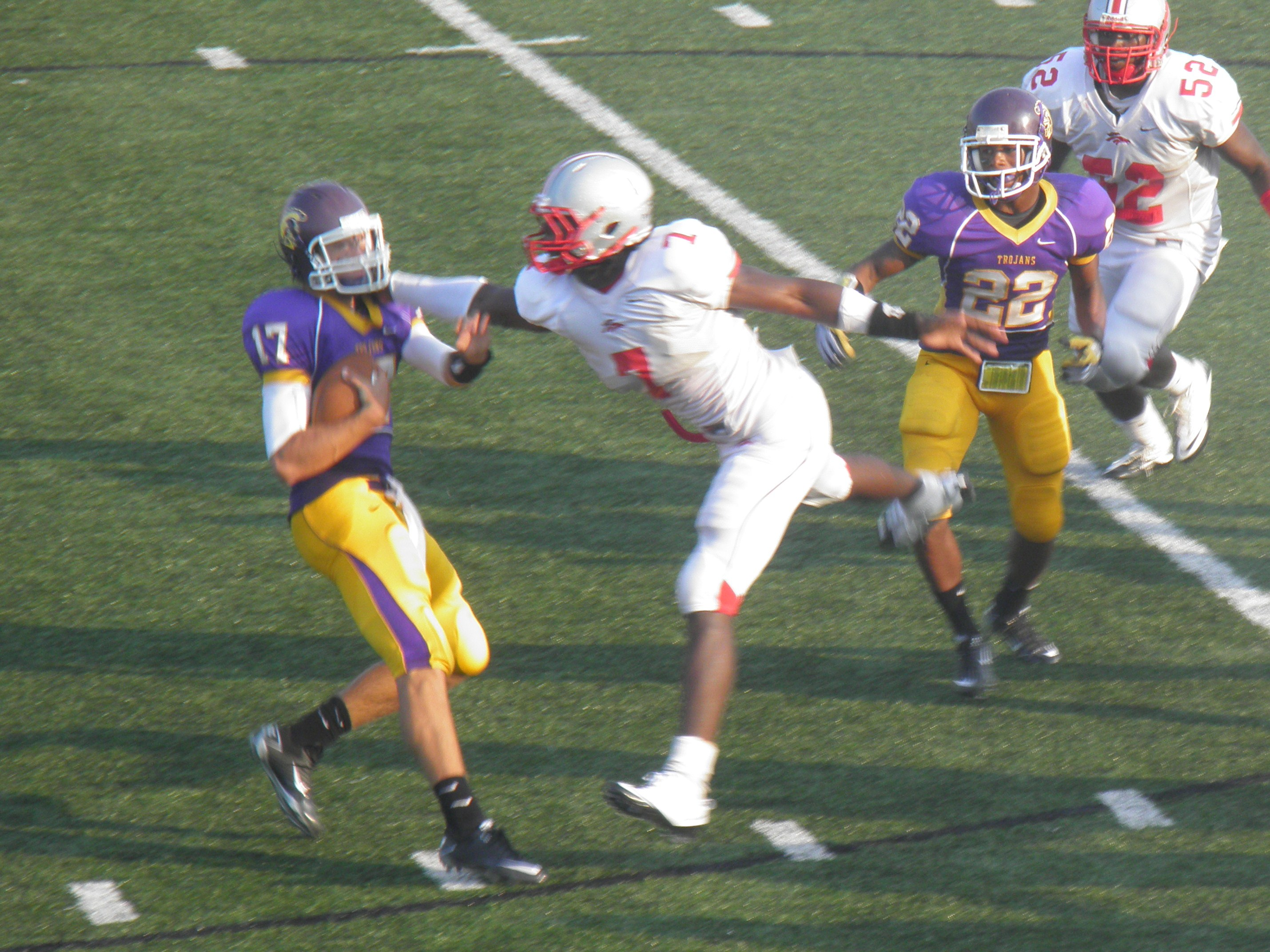
Clowney attempts to sack future Tennessee Volunteer quarterback Justin Worley, during a high school game in 2010

Clowney was born February 14, 1993, in Rock Hill, South Carolina. He attended South Pointe High School, where he played for the Stallions high school football team. Already 6’ 3” and 200 lbs as a freshman in 2007, he played running back and defensive end for the school's junior varsity team. In his sophomore year he joined rising seniors Stephon Gilmore and DeVonte Holloman (both four-star recruits) on a South Pointe varsity coming off a 9–4 season. By spring practice, Clowney became a permanent fixture at defensive end. "We knew we had something special. He was 13 years old in that big athletic body. He was wreaking havoc on our offense that spring and fall," said Bobby Carroll, his coach at South Pointe. South Pointe went 15–0 for the season, including a 35–14 win over town-rival Northwestern High at Memorial Stadium for the 2008 South Carolina AAAAAA Division 1 title and a No. 3 spot in the overall annual MaxPreps high school ranking. Despite playing nearly the entire season with a bone spur in his foot, Clowney finished with 17 sacks. He opted to have surgery on the foot in January 2009.

South Pointe had 31 seniors graduate after the 2008 season, including Gilmore and Holloman. Still, Clowney helped the team to a 10–4 record for the season, and a state semifinal berth, where the Stallions lost to Northwestern. Clowney finished the season with 144 tackles and 23 sacks. In his senior season Clowney tallied 162 tackles, 29.5 sacks, 29 tackles for loss, 11 forced fumbles, and six fumble recoveries, and scored five touchdowns on defense while helping lead his team to a 13–2 record. South Pointe made the state finals for the second time in three years, but lost 23–27 to Myrtle Beach at USC's Williams-Brice Stadium. Still, Clowney was named South Carolina's 2010 Mr. Football. South Pointe was 38–6 during his three varsity seasons.

Immediately following his senior season Clowney went to Spartanburg for the Shrine Bowl of the Carolinas, where he registered 5 tackles (2 solo, 3 assists), 3 sacks for a loss of 15 yards, 2 tackles for a loss of 17 yards, and 2 quarterback hurries. Clowney was lined up against the North Carolina left tackle on every snap he played and drew five holding calls. After the Shrine Bowl, Clowney headed to Orlando, Florida, for a week of Under Armour All-America Game practices and then the all-star game itself. He was the leading tackler for the Red with seven and had 1.5 sacks. Recruiting analysts were particularly interested in his matchup with Cyrus Kouandjio.

Afterwards, Clowney headed to New York City, for a photo shoot for an ESPN the Magazine feature story that appeared in the journal's February 2011 issue.

=== Recruiting ===
During and throughout the entirety of his middle school and high school career, Clowney was often regarded as the best player in his class. ESPN described him as "a special talent who could have vied for the top spot in several previous classes". Both major recruiting services, Rivals.com and Scout.com, as well as ESPNU, considered Clowney not only a five-star recruit, but also they all voted him unanimously as the consensus No. 1 overall prospect of the 2011 class, basically throughout the entirety of his senior year. Unsurprisingly, he received scholarship offers from nearly every perennial BCS powerhouse. However, Clowney left his decision open until after National Signing Day of 2011.

In a live broadcast on ESPN on his eighteenth birthday—February 14, 2011—Clowney announced his commitment to South Carolina, selecting the Gamecocks over Clemson, Alabama, Louisiana State, and Florida State. He was the third-straight South Carolina "Mr. Football" to sign with the Gamecocks, following in the footsteps of his South Pointe teammate Gilmore, and Duncan Byrnes' Marcus Lattimore. "I wanted to play in the SEC. It was easy," Clowney said. "I knew a week ago. I just tried not to tell anybody." Just days earlier, a story in the New York Times questioned Clowney's academic eligibility, but Clowney told reporters he "had no concerns and would be fine".

College recruiting
Name	Hometown	School	Height	Weight	40^{‡}	Commit date
Jadeveon Clowney; DE	Rock Hill, SC	South Pointe (SC)	6 ft 6 in (1.98 m)	240 lb (110 kg)	4.6	Feb 14, 2011
Jadeveon Clowney; DE	Recruit ratings: Scout: Rivals: 247Sports: ESPN:					
Overall recruit ranking: Scout: 1 (DE) Rivals: 1 (DE) 247Sports: 1 (DE) ESPN: 1 (DE)
Note: In many cases, Scout, Rivals, 247Sports, On3, and ESPN may conflict in their listings of height and weight.; In these cases, the average was taken. ESPN grades are on a 100-point scale.; Sources: "South Carolina Football Commitments". Rivals.; "2011 South Carolina Football Commits". Scout.; "ESPN". ESPN.; "Scout.com Team Recruiting Rankings". Scout.; "2011 Team Ranking". Rivals.com.

=== Track ===
Clowney was also on the school's track & field team, where he competed as a sprinter, shot putter and discus thrower. He took ninth in the 100 meters at the 2011 York County Championships, with a career-best time of 11.43 seconds. He recorded a personal-best throw of 14.82 meters in the shot put at the 2011 State Championships, and also ran the fourth leg on the 4 × 100 meter relay squad, helping them earn a third-place finish at 42.86 seconds.

== College career ==
Clowney attended the University of South Carolina where he played on the Gamecocks football team under head coach Steve Spurrier from 2011 through 2013.

=== 2011 season ===
As a true freshman at South Carolina Clowney played and started in all 12 games of the season. He started the season opener against East Carolina, becoming the first freshman to start on the defensive line since Travian Robertson in 2007. In his debut, Clowney had seven tackles, which one of them was on the opening snap of the game, a pass breakup, and a quarterback hurry. A week later in the SEC season opener against Georgia, Clowney recorded his first career quarterback sack in the second quarter, tackling Bulldogs quarterback Aaron Murray for a 7-yard loss. With just over three minutes remaining in the game and the Gamecocks clinging to a 38–35 lead, Clowney strip-sacked Murray at the 20-yard line, and teammate Melvin Ingram returned the fumble for a touchdown to put South Carolina up by 10, and they would go on to win the game, 45–42. Against Vanderbilt, Clowney forced two fumbles, including one that again was recovered by Ingram and returned for a touchdown. In mid-October against Mississippi State, Clowney recorded up a sack, forced fumble, and two quarterback hurries. In South Carolina's 30–13 win over Nebraska in the Capital One Bowl, Clowney recorded four tackles and two sacks of quarterback Taylor Martinez.

For the season Clowney was credited with 36 tackles, including 12 for a loss of yardage. He ranked eighth in the SEC with 8.0 sacks, the only freshman in the top 10, and logged five forced fumbles. He earned SEC Freshman of the Year and All-SEC 2nd Team honors from the league's coaches, and was also named to multiple Freshman All-American 1st Team lists, including The Sporting News, FWAA, Rivals.com, and CBSSports.com.

=== 2012 season ===
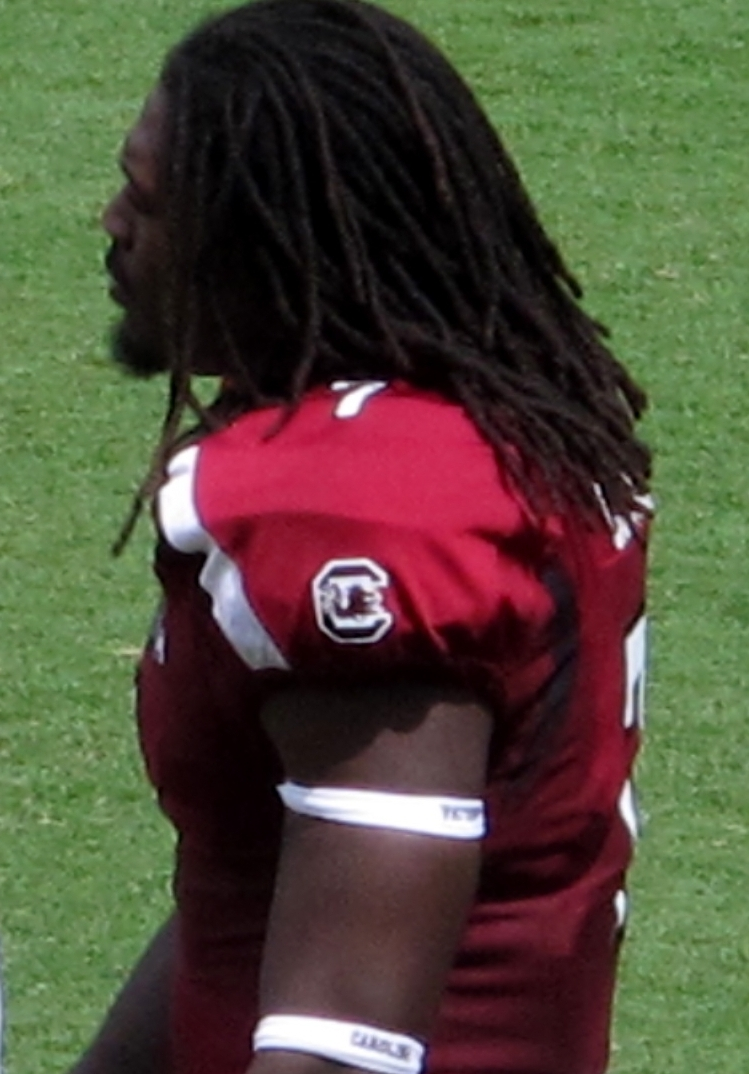
Clowney with South Carolina in 2012

In his sophomore season Clowney emerged as the best defensive player in college football. While helping lead South Carolina to an 11–2 (6–2 SEC) record, he set the school single-season record for sacks (13.0) and tackles for loss (23.5). He also amassed 54 tackles (40 solo) and 3 forced fumbles. Against UAB, Clowney was credited with seven tackles with 3.5 tackles for loss and 2.0 sacks, for which he was named the SEC Defensive Lineman of the Week. In the 27–17 win over Clemson, he sacked Tigers quarterback Tajh Boyd for a single-game school record 4.5 times, earning SEC Defensive Player and Defensive Lineman of the Week honors again. It was also a Clemson Memorial Stadium record, topping the previous mark jointly held by Notre Dame's Ross Browner (1977) and Virginia Tech's Bruce Smith (1984), both College Football Hall of Famers. Along with being a Unanimous All-American, Clowney won the Ted Hendricks Award as the nation's best defensive end. Additionally, he was a finalist for the Chuck Bednarik Award, the Bronko Nagurski Trophy, the Lombardi Award, and finished 6th overall in the 2012 Heisman Trophy voting. Following Clowney's incredible sophomore season, he was voted by the fans as the 2012 AT&T All-America Player of the Year on January 7.

In the Outback Bowl on January 1, 2013, Clowney helped the Gamecocks to a 33–28 victory over the Michigan Wolverines. He gained instant fame for a hit on Michigan running back Vincent Smith that came with eight minutes left in the fourth quarter, after a controversial first down call in Michigan's favor. The hit knocked Smith's helmet off and forced a fumble that Clowney himself recovered, which then set up a touchdown on the next play. On July 17, 2013, Clowney won the 2013 ESPY Award for best play for that hit.

=== 2013 season ===
Following much off-season hype, Clowney began his junior season as a frontrunner for the Heisman Trophy. In the season-opener against North Carolina, weakened by gastroenteritis, Clowney appeared "tired" and only registered three tackles. After a slow start to the season, while being plagued by minor injuries, Clowney's Heisman chances began to fade. His decision to sit out the Kentucky game with a muscle strain near his rib area caused media controversy. In a much anticipated rematch with Tennessee offensive tackle Antonio Richardson at Neyland Stadium, Clowney recorded a season-high five tackles, including four solo, in an overall performance that was widely praised. He sat out another game, against Coastal Carolina, ailing with bone spurs in his right foot on November 23.

Clowney finished his junior season with 35 tackles, 10.5 for a loss of yardage, and three quarterback sacks—considerably lower in each category compared to his sophomore year. Nonetheless, he was again a first-team All-Southeastern Conference (SEC) selection. However, after receiving unanimous All-American honors in 2012, Clowney was only selected to one 2013 All-America team—by the American Football Coaches Association.

After South Carolina's 34–24 win over Wisconsin in the 2014 Capital One Bowl, in which Clowney had five tackles including one for a loss, he announced that he was going to forgo his senior year and enter the NFL draft.

== Professional career ==
=== Pre-draft ===
As early as January 2013, Clowney was projected as a top-three selection in the 2014 NFL draft. "Clowney's a rare talent, basically to the defensive end spot what Andrew Luck and RG3 were to the quarterback position," said ESPN analyst Mel Kiper, Jr. "These type of prospects just don't come along very often." NFL media analyst Bucky Brooks described Clowney as a "meaner, nastier version of Julius Peppers." Clowney's injuries, as well as his mediocre performance early in his junior season reportedly did not scare NFL executives. Late September 2013 mock drafts still ranked Clowney among the top-two picks. After the college season concluded, Clowney was still projected No. 1 overall by Sports Illustrated. In a postgame interview after the Capital One Bowl, Clowney confirmed he was going to enter the 2014 NFL draft.

At the NFL Combine in February 2014, Clowney excelled in the 40-yard dash, posting an official time of 4.53 seconds, the fastest among defensive linemen, which caused USA Today calling him "by far the most freakish physical specimen in this draft".

Pre-draft measurables
Height	Weight	Arm length	Hand span	Wingspan	40-yard dash	10-yard split	20-yard split	20-yard shuttle	Three-cone drill	Vertical jump	Broad jump	Bench press	Wonderlic
6 ft 5 1/4 in (1.96 m)	266 lb (121 kg)	34 1/2 in (0.88 m)	10 in (0.25 m)	6 ft 11 in (2.11 m)	4.53 s	1.59 s	2.68 s	4.43 s	7.27 s	37.5 in (0.95 m)	10 ft 4 in (3.15 m)	21 reps	14
All values from NFL Combine

=== Houston Texans (first stint) ===
==== 2014 season ====
Clowney was selected as the first overall pick by the Houston Texans in the 2014 NFL draft. Clowney joined David Carr and Mario Williams as the third player selected first overall by the Texans. He was also the first defensive player selected first overall by any team since Williams in 2006, as well as the first player in history to be the unanimous highest recruit and be selected first overall in the NFL . On June 6, 2014, Clowney signed a four-year deal worth $22.2725 million that featured a $14.5185 million signing bonus.

Clowney made his professional debut on August 9, 2014, during the first preseason game against the Arizona Cardinals, where he made a tackle for a loss of 5 yards on the first snap of the game. During the second preseason game against the Atlanta Falcons, Clowney recorded his first professional sack where he sacked Matt Ryan in the first quarter. Moments before the third preseason game against the Denver Broncos, Clowney was expected to start but began to experience concussion-like symptoms after a helmet-to-helmet collision with tight end Jacob Tamme during dual practice two days prior and did not play for the rest of the preseason.

Clowney made his regular season debut on September 7 against the Washington Redskins, making one tackle for a loss but left the game early in the second quarter due to a knee injury. It was later revealed that Clowney had a torn meniscus. He underwent surgery to repair the meniscus on September 8, and recovery time required 4 to 6 weeks. Clowney was placed on injured reserve to undergo further surgery on his knee on December 4, ending his rookie season with seven tackles in four games. It was eventually revealed that Clowney had microfracture surgery.

==== 2015 season ====
After a spate of injuries the previous year, Clowney did not play in the preseason, but returned on September 13, 2015, against the Kansas City Chiefs, making four tackles, of which one was for loss, in the 20–27 defeat. Clowney recorded his first regular season NFL sack in a game against the Miami Dolphins on October 25, 2015. In 13 games (9 starts), he had 40 tackles, 4.5 sacks, and six passes defended.

==== 2016 season ====
Clowney was named to his first Pro Bowl and awarded second-team All-Pro by the Associated Press in 2016. He was also named to The Sporting News All-Pro team for recording 6 sacks, 16 tackles for a loss, 52 total tackles, 1 forced fumble, and 2 passes defensed in 14 starts. On January 7, 2017, in the Wild Card Round against the Oakland Raiders, he recorded his first NFL interception against Connor Cook, in a 27–14 win. He was ranked 49th by his fellow players on the NFL Top 100 Players of 2017.

==== 2017 season ====
On April 14, 2017, the Texans picked up the fifth-year option on Clowney's contract.

In Week 2, on Thursday Night Football, cornerback Kareem Jackson caused a fumble on rookie Cincinnati Bengals wide receiver John Ross, which Clowney recovered and took back for 49 yards to set up the Texans offense on a field goal scoring drive. Clowney's play proved important as points were at a premium in the 13–9 victory over the Cincinnati Bengals. On September 24, against the New England Patriots. Clowney scored his first NFL touchdown off of a fumble by Tom Brady, in a 36–33 loss. On December 19, 2017, Clowney was named to his second Pro Bowl, but he could not participate due to his knee surgery. He was ranked #32 by his fellow players on the NFL Top 100 Players of 2018.

==== 2018 season ====
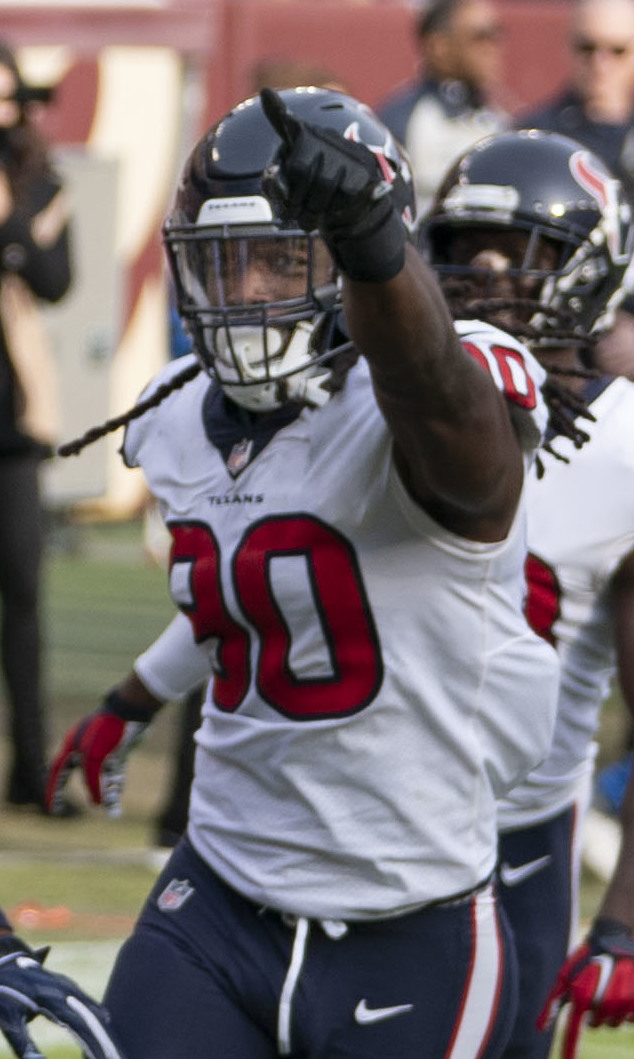
Clowney with the Texans in 2018

In Week 4, Clowney recorded four tackles, two sacks, and recovered a fumble and returned it for a touchdown in a 37–34 win over the Indianapolis Colts, earning him AFC Defensive Player of the Week. On December 23, Clowney illegally sacked Philadelphia Eagles quarterback Nick Foles. He was fined $40,110 for the incident. Overall, in the 2018 season, he finished with nine sacks, 47 total tackles, one pass defensed, one forced fumble, and one fumble recovery for a touchdown.

On March 4, 2019, the Texans placed the franchise tag on Clowney. He was ranked 63rd by his fellow players on the NFL Top 100 Players of 2019.

=== Seattle Seahawks ===
On August 31, 2019, the Texans traded Clowney to the Seattle Seahawks in exchange for Jacob Martin, Barkevious Mingo, and a third-round pick in the 2020 NFL draft (which was later traded to the Oakland Raiders for Gareon Conley). Clowney made his debut with the Seahawks in week 1 against the Bengals. Clowney sacked Andy Dalton once in the 21–20 win. His first-ever regular season interception took place in Cardinals on September 29, 2019, off a screen pass from rookie quarterback Kyler Murray; he returned it to the end zone for a touchdown in Seattle's 27–10 win. On October 3, Clowney forced a fumble from running back Todd Gurley and recovered it as the Seahawks went on to win 30–29 against the Los Angeles Rams on Thursday Night Football. In week 8 against the Falcons, Clowney recorded a strip sack on Matt Ryan which was recovered by teammate Ziggy Ansah in the 27–20 win. In week 10 against the San Francisco 49ers on Monday Night Football, Clowney recorded a strip sack on Jimmy Garoppolo which was recovered by teammate Poona Ford and recovered a fumble forced by teammate Jarran Reed on Garoppolo for a 10-yard touchdown in the 27–24 overtime win. He was named the NFC Defensive Player of the Week for his performance.

In the NFC Wild Card Round against the Eagles, Clowney recorded five tackles and sacked Josh McCown once in the 17–9 win. During the first quarter, Clowney made a helmet-to-helmet hit on Eagles' starting quarterback Carson Wentz which knocked him out of the game. Afterwards, the NFL announced it would not fine Clowney for the hit. On January 17, 2020, Clowney was named one of the 2020 Pro Bowl alternates, but he did not accept it. He was ranked 41st by his fellow players on the NFL Top 100 Players of 2020.

=== Tennessee Titans ===
On September 8, 2020, Clowney signed a one-year deal worth $12 million with the Tennessee Titans. He was placed on injured reserve on November 21, 2020, with a knee injury. Clowney started and played in eight games for the Titans and totaled 19 tackles with four pass deflections and a forced fumble on the season.

=== Cleveland Browns ===
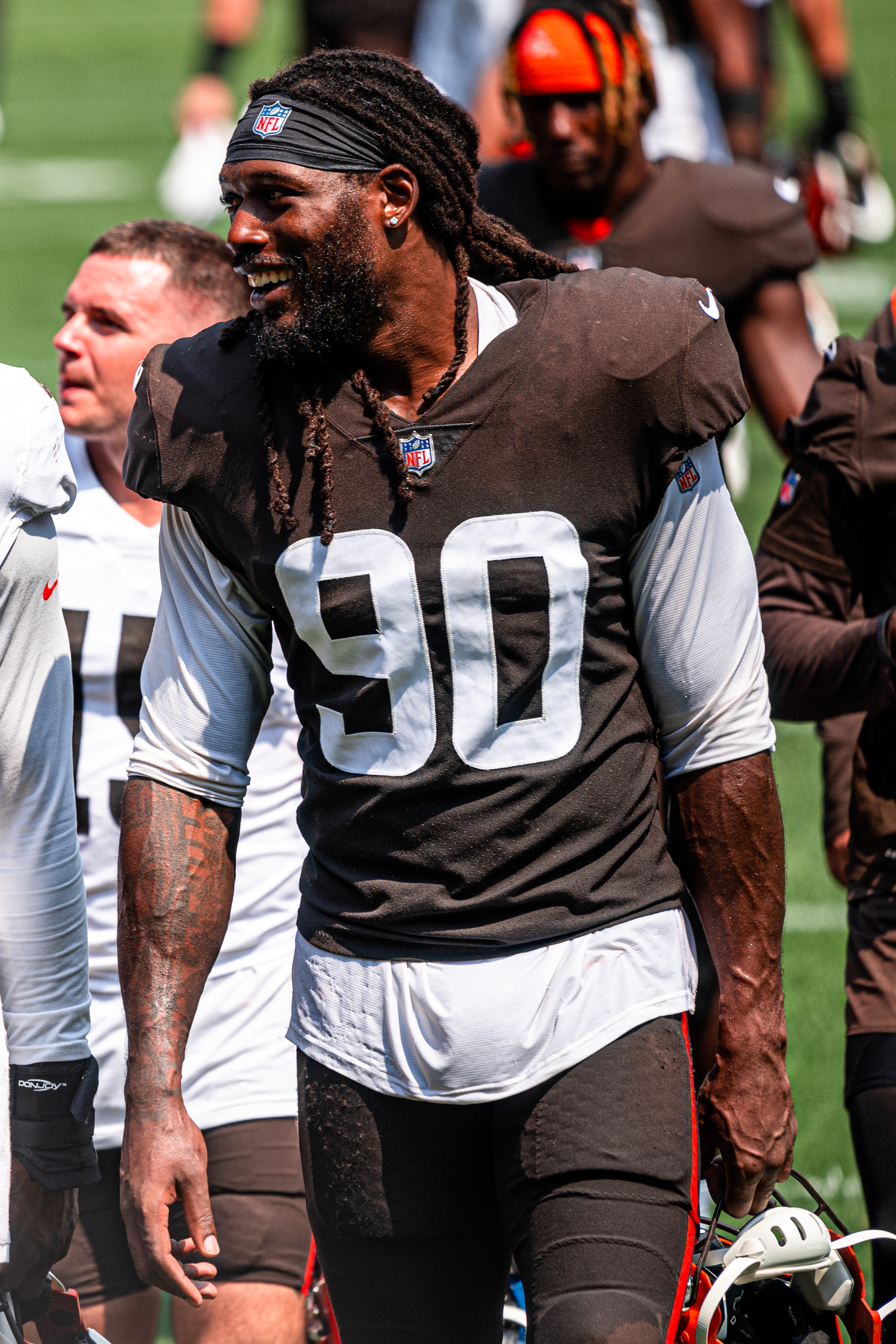
Clowney with the Cleveland Browns in 2021

On April 14, 2021, Clowney signed a one-year contract with the Cleveland Browns. Clowney had a productive first season in Cleveland, appearing in 14 games, posting 37 tackles, nine sacks (his most since 2018), and two forced fumbles, while being named a 2022 Pro Bowl alternate.

On May 22, 2022, Clowney re-signed with the Browns on a one-year deal worth up to $11 million. On January 6, 2023, he was sent home by the Browns after making critical comments about his usage and likelihood to return to Cleveland in 2023. He was inactive for the season finale. On March 15, 2023, Clowney was released by the Browns.

=== Baltimore Ravens ===
On August 18, 2023, Clowney signed a one-year contract with the Baltimore Ravens. He played in all 17 regular season games and started 15 in the 2023 season. He finished with 9.5 sacks, 43 total tackles (24 solo), five passes defended, and two forced fumbles. He recorded a sack in the Ravens' loss to the Kansas City Chiefs in the AFC Championship.

=== Carolina Panthers ===
On March 27, 2024, Clowney signed a two-year, $20 million contract with the Carolina Panthers. He finished the 2024 season with 5.5 sacks, 46 total tackles, and four passes defended.

On May 8, 2025, Clowney was released by the Panthers.

=== Dallas Cowboys ===
On September 14, 2025, Clowney signed a one-year, $3.5 million contract with the Dallas Cowboys. Clowney finished the 2025 season with 8.5 sacks, 41 total tackles (24 solo), four passes defended, and one forced fumble.

=== Houston Texans (second stint) ===
On August 2, 2026, Clowney signed a one-year contract worth up to $8 million with the Houston Texans.

== Career statistics ==
Legend
**Bold**	Career high

=== NFL ===
==== Regular season ====
Year	Team	Games		Tackling				Fumbles				Interceptions					
Year	Team	GP	GS	Cmb	Solo	Ast	Sck	FF	FR	Yds	TD	Int	Yds	Avg	Lng	TD	PD
2014	HOU	4	2	7	5	2	0.0	0	0	0	0	0	0	0.0	0	0	0
2015	HOU	13	9	40	27	13	4.5	1	0	0	0	0	0	0.0	0	0	**6**
2016	HOU	14	14	52	40	12	6.0	1	0	0	0	0	0	0.0	0	0	2
2017	HOU	16	16	**59**	**41**	18	**9.5**	2	2	**71**	**1**	0	0	0.0	0	0	2
2018	HOU	15	14	47	38	9	9.0	1	**3**	0	**1**	0	0	0.0	0	0	1
2019	SEA	13	11	31	21	10	3.0	**4**	2	10	**1**	**1**	**27**	**27.0**	**27T**	**1**	3
2020	TEN	8	8	19	14	5	0.0	1	0	0	0	0	0	0	0	0	4
2021	CLE	14	14	37	24	13	9.0	2	0	0	0	0	0	0	0	0	2
2022	CLE	12	10	28	14	14	2.0	1	1	0	0	0	0	0	0	0	3
2023	BAL	17	15	43	24	19	**9.5**	2	1	0	0	0	0	0	0	0	4
2024	CAR	14	14	46	24	**22**	5.5	0	0	0	0	0	0	0	0	0	4
2025	DAL	13	6	41	24	17	8.5	1	2	0	0	0	0	0	0	0	4
2026	HOU	8	2	18	11	7	5.5	0	0	0	0	0	0	0	0	0	2
Career		161	135	468	307	161	72.0	16	11	81	3	1	27	27.0	27T	1	38

==== Postseason ====
Year	Team	Games		Tackling				Fumbles				Interceptions					
Year	Team	GP	GS	Cmb	Solo	Ast	Sck	FF	FR	Yds	TD	Int	Yds	Avg	Lng	TD	PD
2015	HOU	0	0	Did not play due to injury													
2016	HOU	2	2	3	3	0	0.0	0	0	0	0	**1**	**3**	**3.0**	**3**	0	**2**
2018	HOU	1	1	5	2	**3**	0.0	0	0	0	0	0	0	0	0	0	0
2019	SEA	2	2	**12**	**9**	**3**	**1.5**	0	0	0	0	0	0	0	0	0	0
2020	TEN	0	0	Did not play due to injury													
2023	BAL	2	2	4	2	2	1.0	0	0	0	0	0	0	0	0	0	0
Career		7	7	24	16	8	2.5	0	0	0	0	1	3	3.0	3	0	2

=== College ===
Season	Team	GP	Defense				
Season	Team	GP	Cmb	TfL	Sck	Int	FF
2011	South Carolina	13	36	12.0	8.0	0	**5**
2012	South Carolina	13	**54**	**23.5**	**13.0**	0	3
2013	South Carolina	11	39	11.5	3.0	0	1
Career		37	129	47.0	24.0	0	9

== Personal life ==
Clowney's mother, Josenna Clowney, has been a processing technician at the Frito-Lay plant in Charlotte, North Carolina, since 1994. His father, David Morgan, was released from prison in 2006 after serving nearly 12 years for robbing a Rock Hill check cashing business in 1995. With his father incarcerated for much of his childhood, Clowney was raised by his mother and his maternal grandparents, John and Josephine Clowney, as well as his mother's longtime boyfriend, Christopher Jones. His cousin, Demon Clowney, played college football for Ole Miss, UNC-Charlotte, and South Carolina.

On September 19, 2025, it was revealed that on September 12, two days before he signed with the Dallas Cowboys, Clowney was arrested in his hometown of Rock Hill, South Carolina, on misdemeanor trespassing and failure to identify charges. His arrest followed an incident which involved parking in an area that was off-limits to parking, where Clowney refused to move his car after he was informed of the ban. He also failed to identify himself to officers.
