= DeVonte Holloman =

American football player (born 1991)

No. 57
- Position: Linebacker

Personal information
- Born: February 12, 1991 (age 35); Charlotte, North Carolina, U.S.
- Listed height: 6 ft 2 in (1.88 m)
- Listed weight: 238 lb (108 kg)

Career information
- High school: Independence (Charlotte, North Carolina); South Pointe (Rock Hill, South Carolina)
- College: South Carolina
- NFL draft: 2013: 6th round, 185th overall pick

Career history
- Dallas Cowboys (2013–2014)

Career NFL statistics
- Total tackles: 26
- Sacks: 2
- Fumble recoveries: 1
- Stats at Pro Football Reference

Christopher DeVonte Holloman (born February 12, 1991) is an American former professional football player who was a linebacker in the National Football League (NFL) for the Dallas Cowboys. He played college football for the South Carolina Gamecocks (2009–2012). He was selected by the Cowboys in the sixth round of the 2013 NFL draft.

== Early life ==
A native of Charlotte, North Carolina, Holloman began his high school football career at Independence High School in 2005, where he won two North Carolina 4AA state championships and was a teammate of future NFL player Hakeem Nicks. In his sophomore year, he had 96 tackles and four interceptions. As a junior, he had over 50 tackles with 2 interceptions, while also playing quarterback.

As a senior, he transferred to South Pointe High School in Rock Hill, South Carolina, where he was a teammate of future NFL players Stephon Gilmore and Jadeveon Clowney. He collected 2 interceptions, 3 forced fumbles and received All-state honors. The school finished with a perfect 15-0 record and won the South Carolina AAAA Division II state championship. Regarded as a four-star recruit by Rivals.com, he was listed as the No. 10 outside linebacker prospect in his class.

== College career ==
In 2008, Holloman decommitted from Clemson University after head coach Tommy Bowden was fired and accepted a football scholarship from the University of South Carolina. As a freshman, he was a backup at strong safety, playing in 13 games (2 starts), while registering 30 tackles and one interception. As a sophomore, he was named the starter at strong safety after the fourth game, ranking third on the team with a career-high 69 tackles, while posting 2 interceptions (second on the team).

As a junior, he began the season at the "Spur" hybrid linebacker position, but switched to strong safety after 2 games. He missed 2 games and was fifth on the team with 51 tackles (33 solo), while making 4 tackles for loss, one interception and 4 passes defensed.

As a senior, he was moved back to the "Spur" position, where in 13 games he finished fourth on the team with 57 tackles (8 for loss), 3 interceptions (tied for the team lead), 4 passes defensed, 2 sacks and 2 forced fumbles.

== Professional career ==
Pre-draft measurables
| Height | Weight | 40-yard dash | 10-yard split | 20-yard split | 20-yard shuttle | Three-cone drill | Vertical jump | Broad jump | Bench press |
|---|---|---|---|---|---|---|---|---|---|
| 6 ft 2 in (1.88 m) | 243 lb (110 kg) | 4.71 s | 1.63 s | 2.69 s | 4.26 s | 7.30 s | 34.5 in (0.88 m) | 9 ft 5 in (2.87 m) | 15 reps |
All values from NFL Combine

Holloman was selected in the sixth round (185th overall) of the 2013 NFL draft by the Dallas Cowboys. During the preseason, he showed a knack for creating turnovers, returning a 75-yard interception for a touchdown in the Pro Football Hall of Fame game against the Miami Dolphins.

After being the backup for Justin Durant during the first six games, he missed seven games while recovering from a spine contusion he suffered in practice. Holloman returned to play in the 15th game of the season against the Green Bay Packers, with the Cowboys forced to start him at middle linebacker because of injuries, even though he had never played the position before. He would start three games, with his best production coming in the season finale against the Philadelphia Eagles, leading the team with 11 tackles and two sacks.

During the preseason game against the Baltimore Ravens on August 16, 2014, Holloman's neck was injured (his second neck injury playing football) in the fourth quarter. After visiting with doctors, he was subsequently diagnosed with a narrow spinal column condition (cervical spinal stenosis), which forced him to announce his early retirement on August 25.

== Personal life ==
In 2014, he returned to the University of South Carolina to be a video assistant for the football team. In 2015, he was hired to be the defensive backs coach at Beaufort High School. In 2016, he was promoted to defensive coordinator. On November 13, 2017, he was named the new head coach, succeeding Mark Clifford, who stepped down after 14 years of service. Then, on February 4, 2019, he was named head coach at his alma mater, South Pointe High School, following in the footsteps of former coach, Strait Herron. DeVonte was hired by Pinewood Preparatory School to coach Varsity football, leading them to two state championships.
