= Gerald Dixon =

American football player (born 1969)

No. 51
- Position: Linebacker

Personal information
- Born: June 20, 1969 (age 57); Rock Hill, South Carolina, U.S.
- Listed height: 6 ft 3 in (1.91 m)
- Listed weight: 250 lb (113 kg)

Career information
- High school: Rock Hill
- College: South Carolina
- NFL draft: 1992: 3rd round, 78th overall pick

Career history
- Cleveland Browns (1992–1995); Cincinnati Bengals (1996–1997); San Diego Chargers (1998–2001); Oakland Raiders (2002)*
- * Offseason or practice squad member only

Career NFL statistics
- Total tackles: 325
- Sacks: 23
- Forced fumbles: 2
- Fumble recoveries: 3
- Interceptions: 5
- Defensive touchdowns: 3
- Stats at Pro Football Reference

Gerald Dixon (born June 20, 1969) is an American former professional football player who was a linebacker in the National Football League (NFL). He played college football for the South Carolina Gamecocks and spent 10 seasons in the National Football League (NFL) from 1992 to 2001.

== College career ==
Dixon initially attended Garden City (Kansas) Community College, where he was named the conference player of the year in 1989, before transferring to South Carolina the following season.

Although originally a defensive lineman, after transferring to South Carolina, Dixon transitioned to the linebacker position. In his two-year career with the Gamecocks, he made 70 tackles in each season. Additionally, he was named the team's defensive player of the year in 1990, after finishing the season with three sacks and four tackles for loss.

== Professional career ==
Dixon played for the Cleveland Browns, the Cincinnati Bengals, the San Diego Chargers, and the Oakland Raiders. Dixon was selected by the Browns in the 1992 NFL draft. In 1999, Gerald's father and brother were both killed in the same week. Gerald retired in 2001, to return home and help raise his nephews. He is currently a Physical Education teacher and Little League Coach at Sylvia Circle Elementary School, and he also is the linebackers coach at his old high school Rock Hill High School in Rock Hill, SC.

== Personal life ==
Dixon's cousin, Chris Hope, played safety in the NFL for eleven seasons with the Pittsburgh Steelers, Tennessee Titans, Atlanta Falcons, and Detroit Lions. Hope won Super Bowl XL with the Steelers in 2006.
