= Stephon Gilmore =

American football player (born 1990)

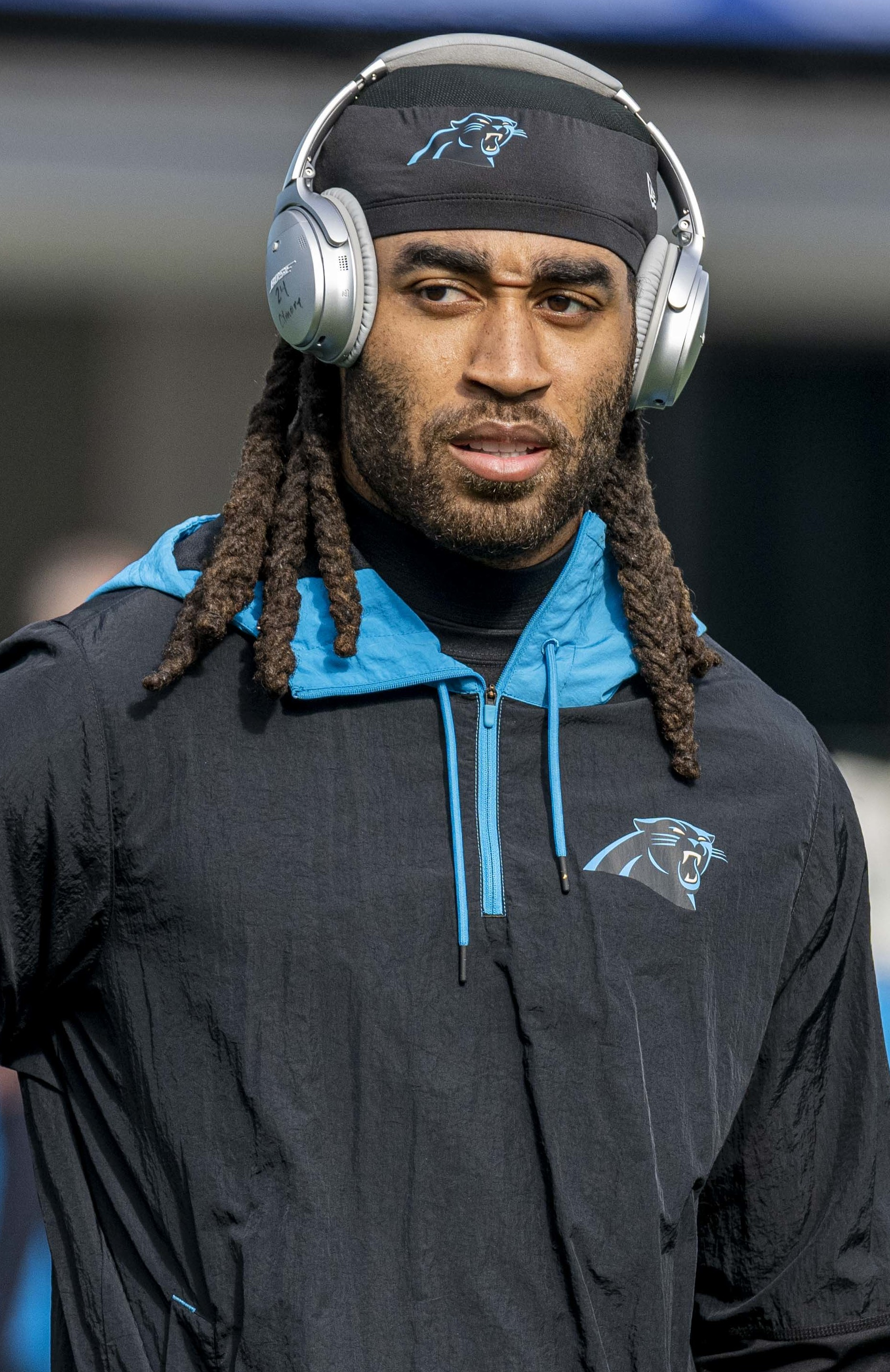
- Gilmore with the Carolina Panthers in 2021

No. 27, 24, 9, 5, 21, 2
- Position: Cornerback

Personal information
- Born: September 19, 1990 (age 36); Rock Hill, South Carolina, U.S.
- Listed height: 6 ft 0 in (1.83 m)
- Listed weight: 190 lb (86 kg)

Career information
- High school: South Pointe (Rock Hill)
- College: South Carolina (2009–2011)
- NFL draft: 2012: 1st round, 10th overall pick

Career history
- Buffalo Bills (2012–2016); New England Patriots (2017–2020); Carolina Panthers (2021); Indianapolis Colts (2022); Dallas Cowboys (2023); Minnesota Vikings (2024)

Awards and highlights
- Super Bowl champion (LIII); NFL Defensive Player of the Year (2019); 2× First-team All-Pro (2018, 2019); 5× Pro Bowl (2016, 2018–2021); NFL interceptions co-leader (2019); New England Patriots All-2010s Team; New England Patriots All-Dynasty Team; Third-team All-American (2010); First-team All-SEC (2010); Freshman All-American (2009)

Career NFL statistics
- Total tackles: 617
- Sacks: 1.0
- Forced fumbles: 7
- Fumble recoveries: 3
- Pass deflections: 149
- Interceptions: 32
- Defensive touchdowns: 2
- Stats at Pro Football Reference

Stephon Stiles Gilmore (born September 19, 1990) is an American former professional football cornerback who played in the National Football League (NFL) for 13 seasons. He played college football for the South Carolina Gamecocks, earning third-team All-American and first-team All-SEC honors in 2010. Gilmore was selected 10th overall in the 2012 NFL draft by the Buffalo Bills, where he spent his first five seasons and earned Pro Bowl honors in 2016.

In 2017, Gilmore joined the New England Patriots and was named Defensive Player of the Year the following season after leading the league in interceptions. Gilmore also extended his Pro Bowl selections to four, received two first-team All-Pro selections, and was a member of the team that won Super Bowl LIII. After four years in New England, Gilmore played one season for the Carolina Panthers, receiving a fifth Pro Bowl selection. He spent his last three seasons with the Indianapolis Colts, Dallas Cowboys, and Minnesota Vikings for one year each. Gilmore is regarded as one of the greatest cornerbacks of his generation.

== Early life ==
Gilmore attended South Pointe High School in Rock Hill, South Carolina, where he played football and basketball, and ran track. In football, Gilmore was a two-way player as a quarterback and defensive back, and helped his team to a perfect 15–0 record and the SCHSL AAAA Division II title as a senior. Among his teammates were DeVonte Holloman and Jadeveon Clowney. Playing quarterback on offense, Gilmore rushed for 1,331 yards and 23 touchdowns and passed for 1,771 yards and 14 touchdowns. He earned first-team all-state honors by The State and was named an All-American by Parade and EA Sports. Gilmore was also named Mr. Football for the state of South Carolina.

In track & field, Gilmore competed as a sprinter during his junior year. He recorded a PR of 11.41 seconds in the 100 meters in the prelims of the Taco Bell Classic. At the York County Meet, Gilmore took fifth in the 200 meters, at 23.14 seconds, and placed ninth in the 400 meters, with a time of 54.94 seconds. He was also a member of the 4 × 100 m relay (43.10s) squad.

Considered a four-star recruit by Rivals.com, Gilmore was listed as the No. 2 overall prospect from South Carolina in the class of 2009. He chose South Carolina over Alabama, Tennessee, and Clemson.

== College career ==
Gilmore graduated from South Pointe High School in December 2008 to enroll at the University of South Carolina early, and participate in spring practice. It worked out, as he came out of spring as a starter at cornerback. Appearing in all 12 games for the Gamecocks, Gilmore was the rare true freshman to start at cornerback in the Southeastern Conference in 2009. He had 52 tackles, five tackles for loss, two sacks, and nine pass deflections, which earned him Freshman All-American honors by College Football News and Phil Steele. Gilmore occasionally appeared on offense, with a career total of three attempted passes and six carries during regular season games. He also completed a 29-yard pass to Alshon Jeffery in the fourth quarter of the 2010 Chick-fil-A Bowl.

== Professional career ==
=== Pre-draft ===
Gilmore attended the NFL Scouting Combine and completed all of the combine drills, finishing second among all defensive backs in the short shuttle, tied for fourth in the 40-yard dash and the three-cone drill, finished sixth in the broad jump, and seventh in the vertical jump. On March 28, 2012, Gilmore attended South Carolina's pro day, along with Alshon Jeffery, Antonio Allen, Melvin Ingram, and 11 other prospects. He opted to only run positional drills for scouts and team representatives from all 32 NFL teams, including then-New York Jets head coach Rex Ryan. At the conclusion of the pre-draft process, Gilmore was projected to be a first round pick by NFL draft analysts. He was ranked the second best cornerback prospect in the draft by DraftScout.com, ESPN analyst Mike Mayock, and NFL draft analyst Adam Rank.

External videos
- Stephon Gilmore's Combine workout

Pre-draft measurables
Height	Weight	Arm length	Hand span	Wingspan	40-yard dash	10-yard split	20-yard split	20-yard shuttle	Three-cone drill	Vertical jump	Broad jump	Bench press
6 ft 0 1/2 in (1.84 m)	190 lb (86 kg)	31 in (0.79 m)	9 1/4 in (0.23 m)	6 ft 1 1/2 in (1.87 m)	4.40 s	1.52 s	2.40 s	3.94 s	6.61 s	36.0 in (0.91 m)	10 ft 3 in (3.12 m)	15 reps
All values from NFL Combine

=== Buffalo Bills ===
==== 2012 ====
External videos
- Buffalo Bills select Stephon Gilmore

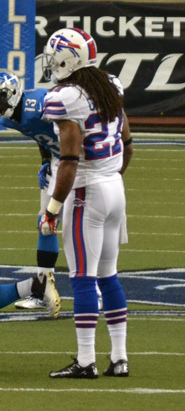
Gilmore in 2012

The Buffalo Bills selected Gilmore in the first round (10th overall) of the 2012 NFL draft. He was the second cornerback selected behind Morris Claiborne and was the highest selected Gamecocks' cornerback since Dunta Robinson in 2004. On May 17, 2012, the Bills signed Gilmore to a four-year, $12.08 million rookie contract that is fully guaranteed and also included a signing bonus of $7.22 million with a fifth-year option.

Gilmore entered training camp projected to be the No. 1 starting cornerback to begin the season, but had minor competition from Aaron Williams and Terrence McGee to earn the role following the departure of Drayton Florence. Head coach Chan Gailey named Gilmore and Williams the starting cornerbacks to begin the regular season.

During the season-opener against the New York Jets, Gilmore made his professional regular season debut and finished the 48–28 road loss with five combined tackles (three solo) and a forced fumble. In the next game against the Kansas City Chiefs, Gilmore recorded a season-high seven solo tackles and three pass deflections during the 35–17 victory. Two weeks later against the New England Patriots, he had seven combined tackles (five solo) and a season-high four pass deflections in the 52–28 loss.

During Week 5 against the San Francisco 49ers, Gilmore recorded five tackles (four solo) and a pass deflection in the 45–3 road loss. In the next game against the Arizona Cardinals, he once again had five tackles (four solo) and a pass deflection during the 19–16 overtime road victory. The following week against the Tennessee Titans, Gilmore recorded a solo tackle and a pass deflection in the narrow 35–34 loss.

Following a Week 8 bye, the Bills went on the road to face the Houston Texans. Gilmore finished the 21–9 loss with three solo tackles and a pass deflection. Two weeks later against the Miami Dolphins on Thursday Night Football, he once again recorded three solo tackles and a forced fumble in the 19–14 victory. In the next game against the Indianapolis Colts, Gilmore had six combined tackles (five solo), two pass deflections, and a forced fumble during the 20–13 road loss.

During a Week 13 34–18 victory over the Jacksonville Jaguars, Gilmore recorded three combined tackles (two solo) and a pass deflection. In the next game against the St. Louis Rams, he had two solo tackles, two pass deflections, and his first NFL interception off a pass by Sam Bradford to tight end Lance Kendricks and returned it for a 62-yard touchdown during the second quarter of the 15–12 loss, but the touchdown was overturned due a supposed holding penalty by defensive lineman Kyle Moore.

Gilmore finished his rookie year with 61 combined tackles (52 solo), 16 pass deflections, three forced fumbles, and an interception in 16 games and starts.

==== 2013 ====
On January 6, 2013, the Bills hired Syracuse head coach Doug Marrone as their new head coach. Following the departure of Terrence McGee, the No. 24 became available and was immediately selected by Gilmore who opted to switch to No. 24 from the No. 27 he wore as a rookie. He entered training camp slated as the de facto No. 1 starting cornerback for the Bills under defensive coordinator Mike Pettine.

During the third preseason game against the Washington Redskins on August 24, Gilmore recorded five combined tackles (three solo) before leaving the eventual 30–7 road loss in the third quarter with a wrist injury. Two days later, head coach Doug Marrone announced that Gilmore had fractured his wrist during the game and had would require surgery, but the Bills chose not to place Gilmore on injured reserve as he would have to remain inactive for a minimum of eight games and had an expected recovery time of six to eight weeks. In Gilmore's absence, Leodis McKelvin was named the No. 1 starting cornerback to begin the season and was paired with the fairly inexperienced Justin Rogers.

Upon Gilmore's return in Week 6 against the Cincinnati Bengals, Rogers was immediately benched, and Gilmore began his first two games (Weeks 6–7) as the third cornerback on the depth chart behind McKelvin and Aaron Williams. During a Week 9 23–13 loss to the Chiefs, Gilmore had a season-high seven combined tackles (six solo) and a pass deflection. Two weeks later against the Jets, he recorded two solo tackles and a pass deflection in the 37–14 victory. Following a Week 12 bye, the Bills went to Toronto to face the Atlanta Falcons. Gilmore finished the 34–31 overtime loss with five combined tackles (four solo) and a pass deflection.

During Week 14 against the Tampa Bay Buccaneers, Gilmore recorded two solo tackles, two pass deflections, and his first interception of the season in the 27–6 road victory. In the next game against the Jaguars, Gilmore had two solo tackles, an interception, and a pass deflection during the 27–20 road victory. The following week against the Dolphins, he recorded three solo tackles and three pass deflections in the 19–0 shutout victory.

Gilmore finished his second professional season with 35 combined tackles (30 solo), 10 pass deflections, a fumble recovery, and two interceptions in 11 games and nine starts.

==== 2014 ====
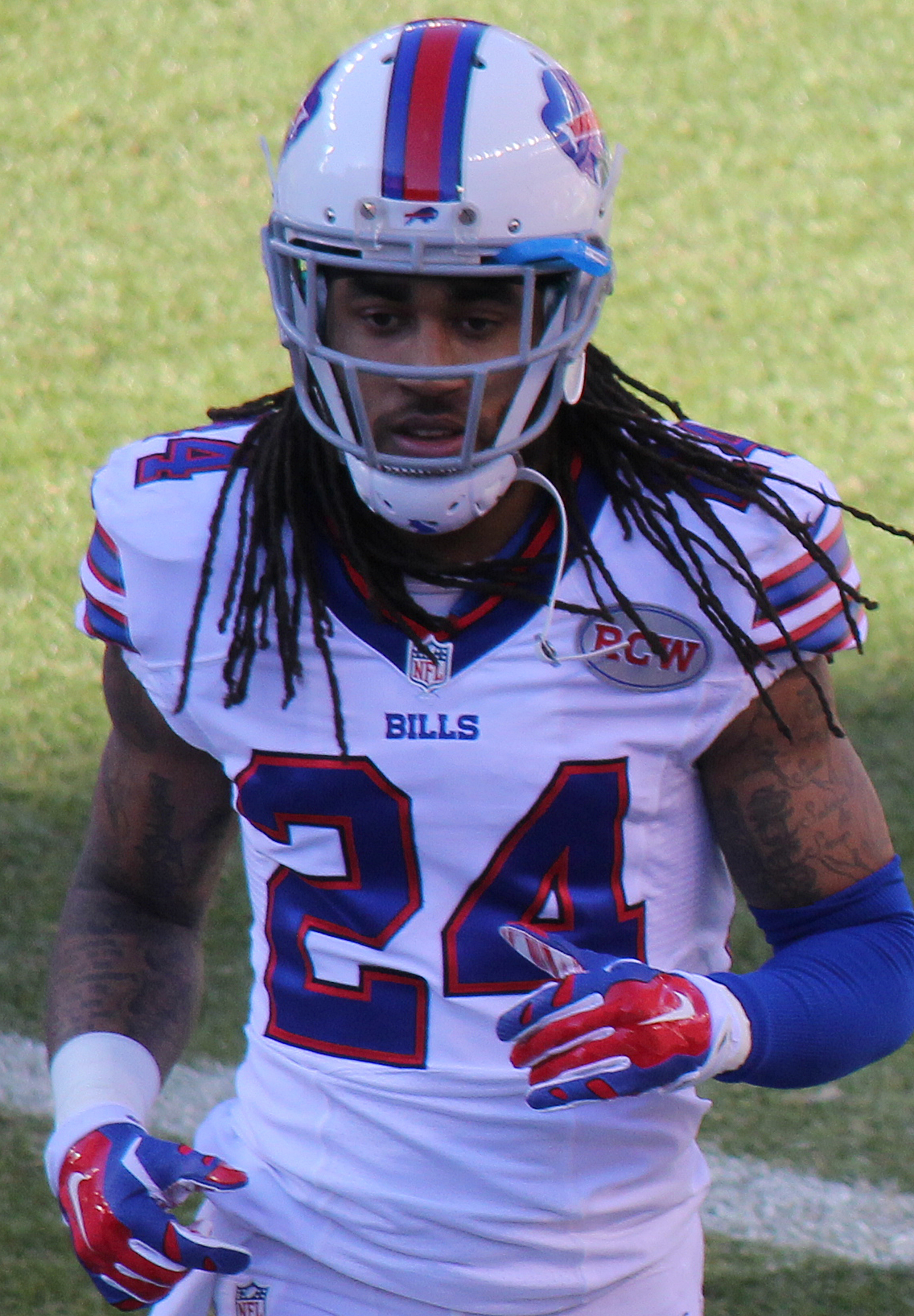
Gilmore in 2014

On January 25, 2014, the Bills hired former Detroit Lions head coach Jim Schwartz to be their defensive coordinator following the departure of Mike Pettine, who accepted the head coaching position with the Cleveland Browns. Head coach Doug Marrone named Gilmore and Leodis McKelvin the starting cornerbacks to start the season with Corey Graham, Nickell Robey-Coleman, and Ross Cockrell as the backups.

Gilmore was inactive for the season-opener against the Chicago Bears due to a groin injury. He returned in time for the Week 2 matchup against the Dolphins and finished the 29–10 victory with two combined tackles (one solo). In the next game against the San Diego Chargers, he recorded a season-high of six solo tackles during the 22–10 loss. Two weeks later against the Lions, Gilmore had four combined tackles (three solo), a pass deflection, and his first interception of the season off of Matthew Stafford in the 17–14 road victory.

During a Week 8 43–23 road victory over the Jets, Gilmore had five combined tackles (four solo), an interception, and a pass deflection. Following a Week 9 bye, the Bills returned home to face the Chiefs. Gilmore finished the 17–13 loss with three combined tackles (two solo) and a forced fumble.

During Week 14 against the Denver Broncos, Gilmore recorded three combined tackles (one solo), a pass deflection, and an interception in the 24–17 road loss. In the next game against the Green Bay Packers, he had two solo tackles and two pass deflections during the 21–13 victory. The following week against the Oakland Raiders, Gilmore recorded a solo tackle before sustaining a concussion while attempting to tackle wide receiver Kenbrell Thompkins in the third quarter of the narrow 26–24 road loss. He subsequently remained in concussion protocol and was inactive for the regular season finale against the Patriots.

Gilmore finished the 2014 season with 46 combined tackles (38 solo), six pass deflections, three interceptions, and a forced fumble in 14 games and starts. The Bills finished second in the AFC East with a 9–7 record, but did not qualify for the playoffs. On December 31, 2014, Doug Marrone controversially announced his resignation as head coach after deciding to exercise an opt-out clause that was included in his contract.

==== 2015 ====
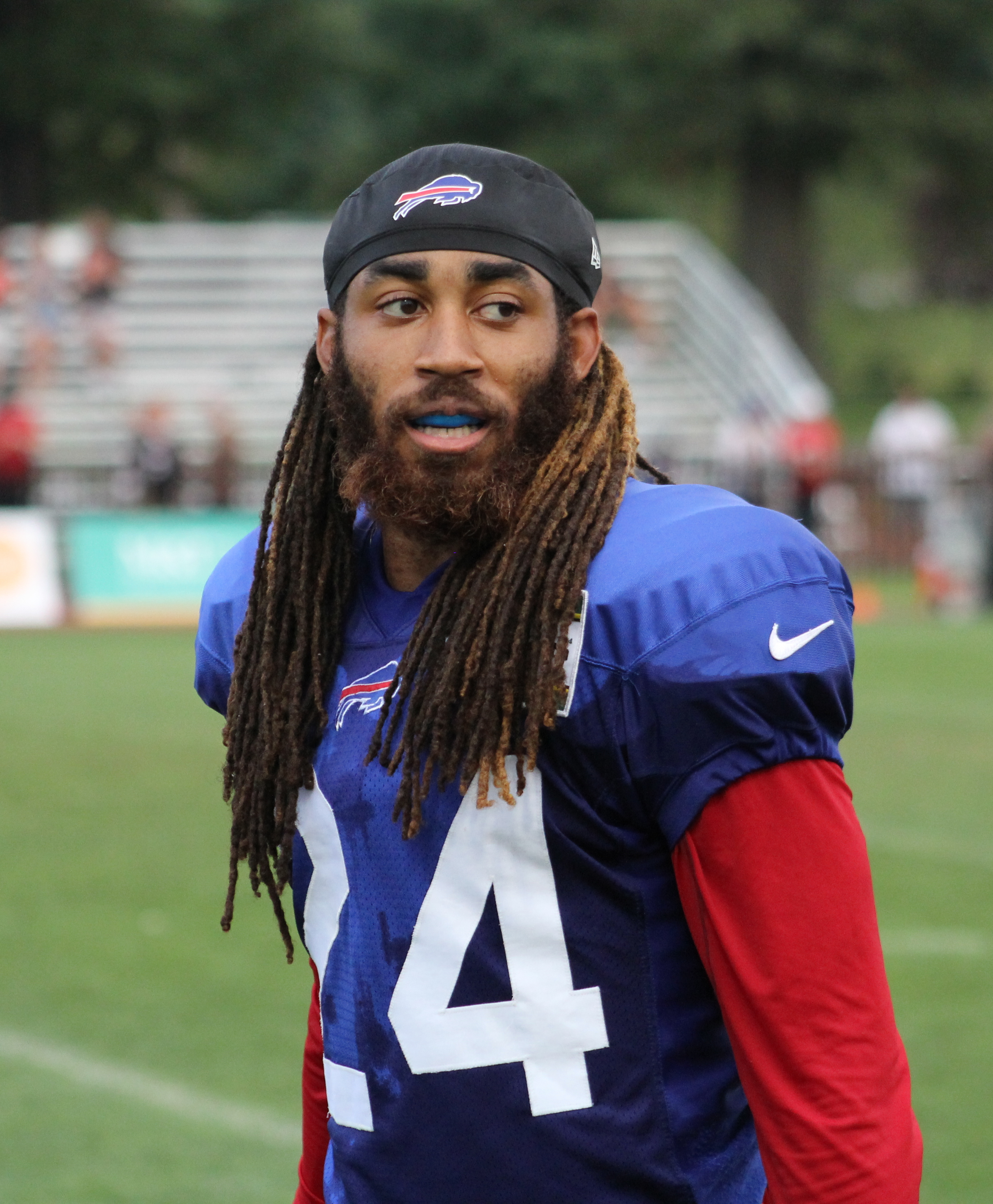
Gilmore at practice in 2015

On January 12, 2015, the Bills hired recently fired former New York Jets head coach Rex Ryan to be their 18th head coach. On August 28, the Bills exercised the fifth-year option on Gilmore's rookie contract, which was a fully-guaranteed one-year, $11.08 million contract. He entered training camp slated as the de facto No. 1 starting cornerback under new defensive coordinator Dennis Thurman. Gilmore was named a starting cornerback to begin the season and was paired with rookie second-round pick Ronald Darby.

During the season-opener against the Colts, Gilmore recorded season-highs with six solo tackles and four pass deflections in the 27–14 victory. Three weeks later against the New York Giants, he had two solo tackles, two pass deflections, and an interception in the 24–10 loss. In the next game against the Titans, he recorded a solo tackle and an interception while also tying his season-high of four pass deflections during the narrow 14–13 road victory.

During a Week 6 34–21 loss to the Bengals, Gilmore had five solo tackles and two pass deflections. Three weeks later against the Dolphins, he recorded three solo tackles and a pass deflection in the 33–17 victory. In the next game against the Jets on Thursday Night Football, Gilmore had two solo tackles and two pass deflections during the 22–17 road victory.

During Week 11 against the Patriots on Monday Night Football, Gilmore recorded a solo tackle, two pass deflections, and an interception off of Tom Brady in the 20–13 road loss. In the next game against the Chiefs, Gilmore tied his season-high of six solo tackles and deflected a pass during the 30–22 road loss. The following week against the Texans, he had two solo tackles before leaving the eventual 30–21 victory in the third quarter after injuring his shoulder while making a tackle on running back Akeem Hunt. On December 16, Gilmore was placed on injured reserve and he remained inactive for the last four games of the season after undergoing surgery to repair his torn labrum the previous day. Without Gilmore, the Bills finished 8–8 and did not qualify for the playoffs.

Gilmore finished the 2015 season with 36 solo tackles, 18 pass deflections, and three interceptions in 12 games and starts. He received an overall grade of 82.2 from Pro Football Focus, which ranked 21st among all qualifying cornerbacks in 2015.

==== 2016: First Pro Bowl ====
In 2016, Gilmore returned as the No. 1 starting cornerback and remained paired together with Ronald Darby.

During the season-opening 13–7 road loss to the Baltimore Ravens, Gilmore had five combined tackles (three solo) and a pass deflection. In the next game against the Jets on Thursday Night Football, he recorded a season-high six solo tackles during the 37–31 loss. The following week against the Cardinals, Gilmore had three combined tackles (two solo), a season-high four pass deflections, and intercepted Carson Palmer twice in the 33–18 victory.

During Week 6 against the 49ers, Gilmore recorded three solo tackles and a pass deflection in the 45–16 victory. In the next game against the Dolphins, he had a solo tackle and a pass deflection during the 28–25 road loss. During a Week 11 16–12 road victory over the Bengals, Gilmore recorded six combined tackles (five solo) and three pass deflections while tying his season-high of two interceptions.

During a Week 14 27–20 victory over the Pittsburgh Steelers, Gilmore had a solo tackle, a pass deflection, and an interception. Two weeks later against the Dolphins, he recorded four combined tackles (three solo) and a pass deflection before leaving the eventual 34–31 overtime loss at the end of the game with a concussion. On December 27, the Bills fired head coach Rex Ryan after falling to 7–8 and appointed running backs coach Anthony Lynn to interim head coach for the final game of the season. However, Gilmore was inactive for the regular season finale against the Jets due to his concussion.

Gilmore finished the 2016 season with 48 combined tackles (42 solo), 12 pass deflections, and a then career-high five interceptions in 15 games and starts. His five interceptions were the most by a Bills' player since Jairus Byrd intercepted five passes in 2012. Gilmore received an overall grade of 73.2 from Pro Football Focus, which ranked 60th among 111 qualifying cornerbacks in 2016. On January 23, 2017, the Bills announced that he was voted to the 2017 Pro Bowl. Gilmore also received the Ed Block Courage Award.

After the 2016 season, the Bills hired Carolina Panthers defensive coordinator Sean McDermott as the 19th head coach in franchise history. Gilmore entered free agency for the first time in his career after not receiving a contract offer from the Bills. Gilmore entered contract negotiations with the Chicago Bears, but was unable to reach a deal.

=== New England Patriots ===
==== 2017: Super Bowl LII appearance ====
On March 9, 2017, the New England Patriots signed Gilmore to a five-year, $65 million contract with $40 million guaranteed, $31 million guaranteed upon signing, and an initial signing bonus of $18 million.

Gilmore entered training camp as a slated to be a starting cornerback under defensive coordinator Matt Patricia following the departure of Logan Ryan. Head coach Bill Belichick named Gilmore the No. 1 starting cornerback, alongside Malcolm Butler, to begin the season and he led a cornerback group including Jonathan Jones and Eric Rowe.

Gilmore made his Patriots debut in the season-opener against the Chiefs and finished the 42–27 loss with four combined tackles (three solo) and a pass deflection. Two weeks later against the Texans, Gilmore had four solo tackles, a pass deflection, and his first interception of the season on a pass thrown by Deshaun Watson to wide receiver DeAndre Hopkins in the 36–33 victory. During a Week 5 19–14 road victory over the Buccaneers on Thursday Night Football, Gilmore recorded five solo tackles before leaving in the second quarter after sustaining a concussion following an accidental helmet-to-helmet collision with wide receiver Mike Evans. Gilmore subsequently remained inactive in concussion protocol for the next three games (Weeks 6–8).

Gilmore returned from injury in time for the Week 10 matchup against the Broncos. He finished the 41–16 road victory on Sunday Night Football with three solo tackles and a pass deflection. In the next game against the Raiders at Estadio Azteca, Gilmore recorded five solo tackles and a pass deflection during the 33–8 victory. The following week against the Dolphins, he had a solo tackle, a pass deflection, and an interception in the 35–17 victory.

During a Week 13 23–3 blowout victory over his former team, the Buffalo Bills, Gilmore had three solo tackles and two pass deflections. Two weeks later against the Steelers, he recorded a season-high eight solo tackles and a pass deflection in the 27–24 road victory. In the regular season finale against the Jets, Gilmore had three combined tackles (two solo) and a pass deflection during the 26–6 victory.

Gilmore finished the 2017 season with a then career-high 50 combined tackles (47 solo), nine pass deflections, and two interceptions in 13 games and starts. Pro Football Focus had him finish the season with an overall grade of 89.4. The Patriots finished atop the AFC East with a 13–3 record and qualified for the playoffs as the #1-seed. In the Divisional Round against the Titans, Gilmore made his postseason debut and finished the 35–14 victory with a tackle and two pass deflections. During the AFC Championship Game against the Jaguars, Gilmore had five solo tackles and two pass deflections in the 24–20 comeback victory as the Patriots advanced to Super Bowl LII. In the Super Bowl against the Philadelphia Eagles, he recorded four solo tackles and two pass deflections during the 41–33 loss.

==== 2018: Super Bowl LIII victory and Second Pro Bowl ====
Gilmore after winning Super Bowl LIII

Head coach Bill Belichick took over defensive coordinator duties after Matt Patricia departed to become the head coach of the Detroit Lions. Throughout training camp, Gilmore was slated as the de facto No. 1 starting cornerback after Malcolm Butler left in free agency. He began the season as a starting cornerback alongside Eric Rowe, and led a young cornerback group that included Jonathan Jones and rookies Duke Dawson, Keion Crossen, and J. C. Jackson.

During the season-opening 27–20 victory over the Texans, Gilmore had a season-high eight combined tackles (seven solo), two pass deflections, and an interception. In the next game against the Jaguars, he recorded five solo tackles, two pass deflections, and a forced fumble during the 31–20 road loss. Three weeks later against the Colts on Thursday Night Football, Gilmore had a solo tackle and a season-high three pass deflections in the 38–24 victory.

During Week 6 against the Chiefs on Sunday Night Football, Gilmore recorded two solo tackles and a pass deflection in the 43–40 victory. In the next game against the Bears, he had a solo tackle and a pass deflection during the 38–31 road victory. The following week against his former team, the Bills, on Monday Night Football, Gilmore recorded three solo tackles and two pass deflections in the 25–6 road victory.

During a Week 9 31–17 victory over the Packers on Sunday Night Football, Gilmore had three solo tackles, a pass deflection, and a fumble recovery. In the next game against the Titans, he had four solo tackles, a forced fumble, and his first NFL sack on Marcus Mariota during the 34–10 road loss. Two weeks later against the Jets, Gilmore had a tackle and an interception while tying his season-high of three pass deflections in the 27–13 road victory.

During a narrow Week 14 34–33 road loss to the Dolphins, Gilmore recorded a solo tackle and a pass deflection. In the next game against the Steelers, he had three solo tackles and two pass deflections during the 17–10 road loss. Two weeks later against the Jets, Gilmore recorded a solo tackle and two pass deflections in the 38–3 blowout victory.

Gilmore finished the 2018 season with 45 combined tackles (40 solo), a career-high and league-leading 20 pass deflections, two interceptions, two forced fumbles, a fumble recovery, and a sack in 16 games and starts. He was named to the 2019 Pro Bowl, earning Pro Bowl honors for the second time in his career. Gilmore was also named first-team All-Pro and was the highest graded cornerback in the league by Pro Football Focus. He received an overall grade of 90.9 from Pro Football Focus, which was a career-high and ranked first among all qualifying cornerbacks in 2019. The Patriots finished atop the AFC East with an 11–5 record and qualified for the playoffs as the #2-seed. In the Divisional Round against the Los Angeles Chargers, Gilmore had a solo tackle, two pass deflections, and intercepted a pass by Philip Rivers to wide receiver Keenan Allen during the 41–28 victory. During the AFC Championship Game against the Chiefs, Gilmore was limited to a solo tackle in the 37–31 overtime road victory as the Patriots advanced to Super Bowl LIII. In the Super Bowl against the Los Angeles Rams and recorded five solo tackles, a forced fumble, led both teams with three pass deflections, and helped secure the Patriots' 13–3 victory with an interception late in the fourth quarter on a pass thrown by quarterback Jared Goff to wide receiver Brandin Cooks.

==== 2019: Defensive Player of the Year and Third Pro Bowl ====
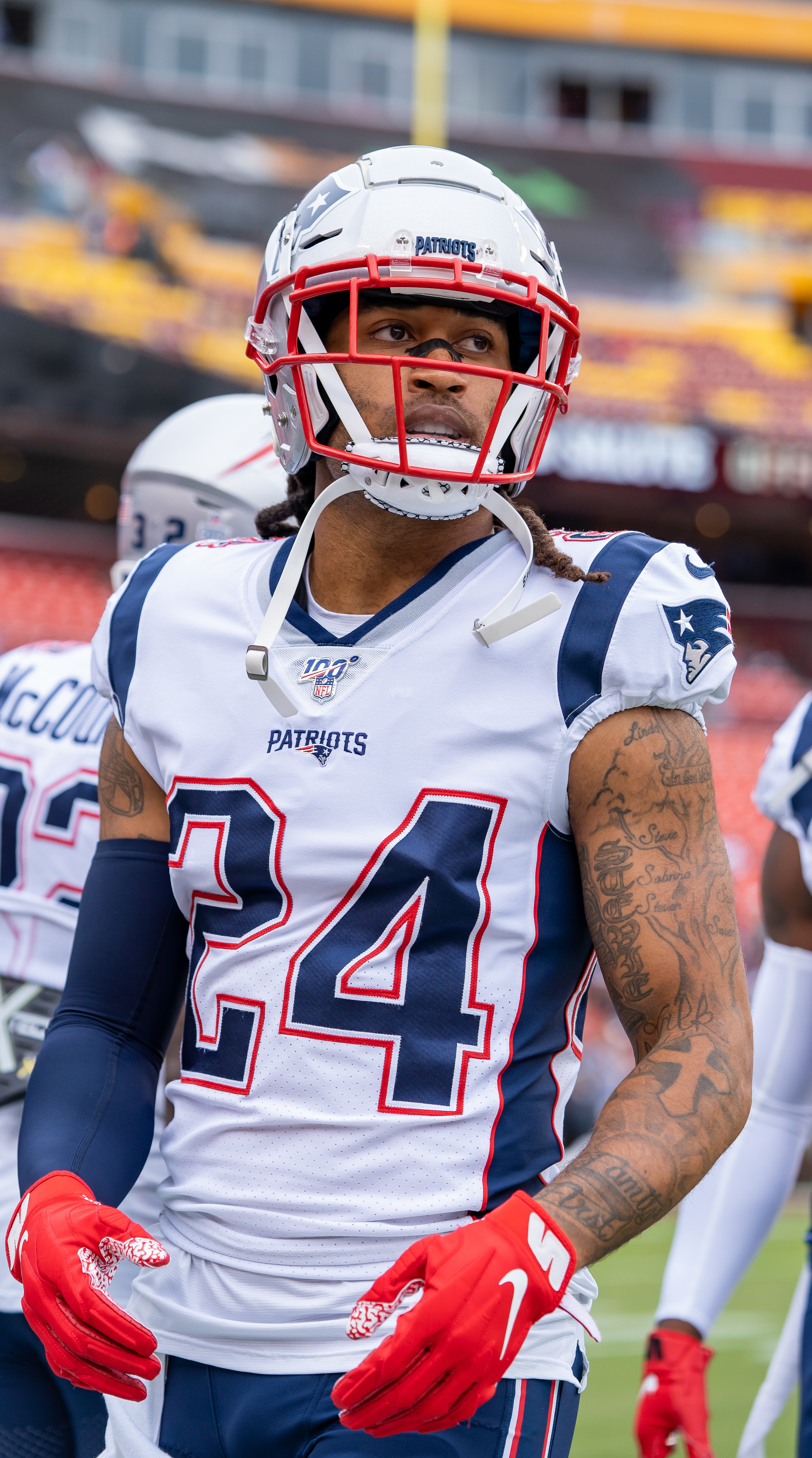
Gilmore in 2019

Gilmore returned to training camp as the Patriots' de facto No. 1 starting cornerback and led a young group of corners that included rookies Joejuan Williams and Ken Webster, Jonathan Jones, J. C. Jackson, and Duke Dawson. Head coach Bill Belichick named him the No. 1 starting cornerback to begin the season and paired him with Jason McCourty.

During the season-opener against the Steelers on Sunday Night Football, Gilmore recorded six combined tackles (four solo) in the 33–3 blowout victory. In the next game against the Dolphins, he had two tackles, three pass deflections, and scored his first NFL touchdown on a pick-six after intercepting a pass by former teammate Ryan Fitzpatrick to wide receiver DeVante Parker and returned it for a 54-yard touchdown during the 43–0 shutout road victory.

During a Week 6 35–14 victory over the Giants on Thursday Night Football, Gilmore had three combined tackles (two solo), a career-high five pass deflections, and a highlight toe-tapping sideline interception off a pass by Daniel Jones to fullback Rhett Ellison, allowing a 0.0 passer rating when targeted. After the game, former Patriots' cornerback Darrelle Revis stated that Gilmore was "by far the best corner in the league right now." In the next game against the Jets on Monday Night Football, Gilmore recorded a pass deflection and an interception after picking off a pass thrown by Sam Darnold to Robby Anderson during the 33–0 shutout road victory. The following week against the Browns, Gilmore had four solo tackles and a pass deflection in the 27–13 victory. He was named AFC Defensive Player of the Month after recording 11 combined tackles (10 solo), seven pass deflections, and two interceptions.

During Week 11 against the Eagles, Gilmore recorded two solo tackles and a pass deflection in the 17–10 road victory. In the next game against the Dallas Cowboys, he had five combined tackles (four solo), two pass deflections, and set a new career-high with his fourth interception of the season after picking off a pass by Dak Prescott to wide receiver Amari Cooper during the 13–9 victory. Two weeks later against the Chiefs, Gilmore recorded five combined tackles (four solo), a pass deflection, and a fumble recovery in the 23–16 victory.

During a Week 15 34–13 road victory over the Bengals, Gilmore had two solo tackles, four pass deflections, and two interceptions, returning one for a 64-yard touchdown. Gilmore did not allow a touchdown reception until the next game against his former team, the Bills, when he allowed a 53-yard touchdown reception by wide receiver John Brown. Gilmore finished the 24–17 victory with a solo tackle and a pass deflection. In the regular season finale against the Dolphins, he recorded a season-high eight combined tackles (five solo) and a pass deflection, but had his worst performance of the season during the 27–24 loss, allowing eight receptions for 137 yards by DeVante Parker.

Gilmore finished the 2019 season with a then career-high 53 combined tackles (44 solo), a fumble recovery, a league-leading 20 pass deflections, and a league-leading six interceptions, two of which were returned for touchdowns. He received an overall grade of 82.9 from Pro Football Focus in 2019 and was named the Associated Press NFL Defensive Player of the Year in recognition of his excellent season, becoming the first member of the Patriots to win the award in their 50 year span. Gilmore was the first cornerback to win the award since Charles Woodson did so in 2009 with the Green Bay Packers. Gilmore was also awarded The Sporting News Defensive Player of the Year award. The Patriots finished atop the AFC East with a 12–4 record and qualified for the playoffs as the #3-seed. During the Wild Card Round against the Titans, Gilmore recorded two solo tackles in the 20–13 loss.

==== 2020 ====
Gilmore returned as the No. 1 starting cornerback in his third season under Bill Belichick acting as defensive coordinator. He was named a starting cornerback to begin the season and played alongside Jason McCourty, Jonathan Jones, and J. C. Jackson.

During the season-opening 21–11 victory over the Dolphins, Gilmore had five combined tackles (four solo), a pass deflection, and his first and only interception of the season on a pass by Ryan Fitzpatrick to wide receiver Preston Williams. Two weeks later against the Las Vegas Raiders, Gilmore recorded a pass deflection in the 36–20 victory. In the next game against the Chiefs on Monday Night Football, he had three solo tackles and a forced fumble during the 26–10 road loss.

On October 7, Gilmore tested positive for COVID-19 and was placed on the reserve/COVID-19 list. He was added back to the active roster eight days later. During a Week 7 33–6 loss to the 49ers, Gilmore recorded a season-high six combined tackles (three solo). On October 30, it was reported by Ian Rapoport that Gilmore had tweaked his knee during practice and was given an MRI. Gilmore's knee injury was not considered to be serious, but he was inactive for three games (Weeks 8–10).

During Week 11 against the Texans, Gilmore returned from injury and tied his season-high of six combined tackles (four solo) in the 27–20 road loss. Two weeks later against the Chargers, Gilmore had a solo tackle and a pass deflection in the 45–0 shutout road victory. During a Week 15 22–road loss to the Dolphins, he recorded two solo tackles before leaving in the second quarter after he was injured by accidentally slipping on the turf while covering a pass attempt to wide receiver Mack Hollins. On December 23, the Patriots officially placed Gilmore on injured reserve as he was required to undergo surgery to repair his torn quadriceps and was inactive for the last two games of the season.

Gilmore finished the 2020 season with 37 combined tackles (30 solo), three pass deflections, a forced fumble, and an interception in 11 games and starts. Although he had a disappointing season, Gilmore was unexpectedly named to the 2021 Pro Bowl. He received an overall grade of 61.0 from Pro Football Focus in 2020.

On August 31, 2021, Gilmore was placed on the reserve/physically unable to perform list to start the season due to the quad injury he suffered the previous season.

=== Carolina Panthers ===
On October 6, 2021, the Carolina Panthers acquired Gilmore from the Patriots in a trade for a sixth-round selection (#187-Kayshon Boutte) in the 2023 NFL draft. The Patriots' decision to trade Gilmore was after they were unable to reach a new contract agreement with him. The trade was necessitated following 2021 first-round pick Jaycee Horn being placed on injured reserve after fracturing his foot in Week 3.

Due to his quadriceps injury, Gilmore remained on the PUP/reserve list until Week 8. Upon being activated and joining the active roster, he was named a backup and was listed as the No. 4 cornerback on the depth chart behind Donte Jackson, A. J. Bouye, and Keith Taylor. Gilmore made his Panthers debut in Week 8 against the Falcons and finished the 19–13 road victory two combined tackles (one solo), a pass deflection, and an interception. In the next game against his former team, the Patriots, Gilmore recorded two solo tackles, a pass deflection, and intercepted a pass by Mac Jones during the 24–6 loss. During Week 16 against the Buccaneers, Gilmore had a season-high three solo tackles before leaving the eventual 32–6 loss with a groin injury in the third quarter. He was inactive for the last two games of the season due to his injury.

Gilmore finished the 2021 season with only 16 combined tackles (15 solo), two pass deflections, and two interceptions in eight games and three starts. Despite playing in a small number of games, he was named to the 2022 Pro Bowl. Gilmore received an overall grade of 77.1 from Pro Football Focus in 2021.

=== Indianapolis Colts ===
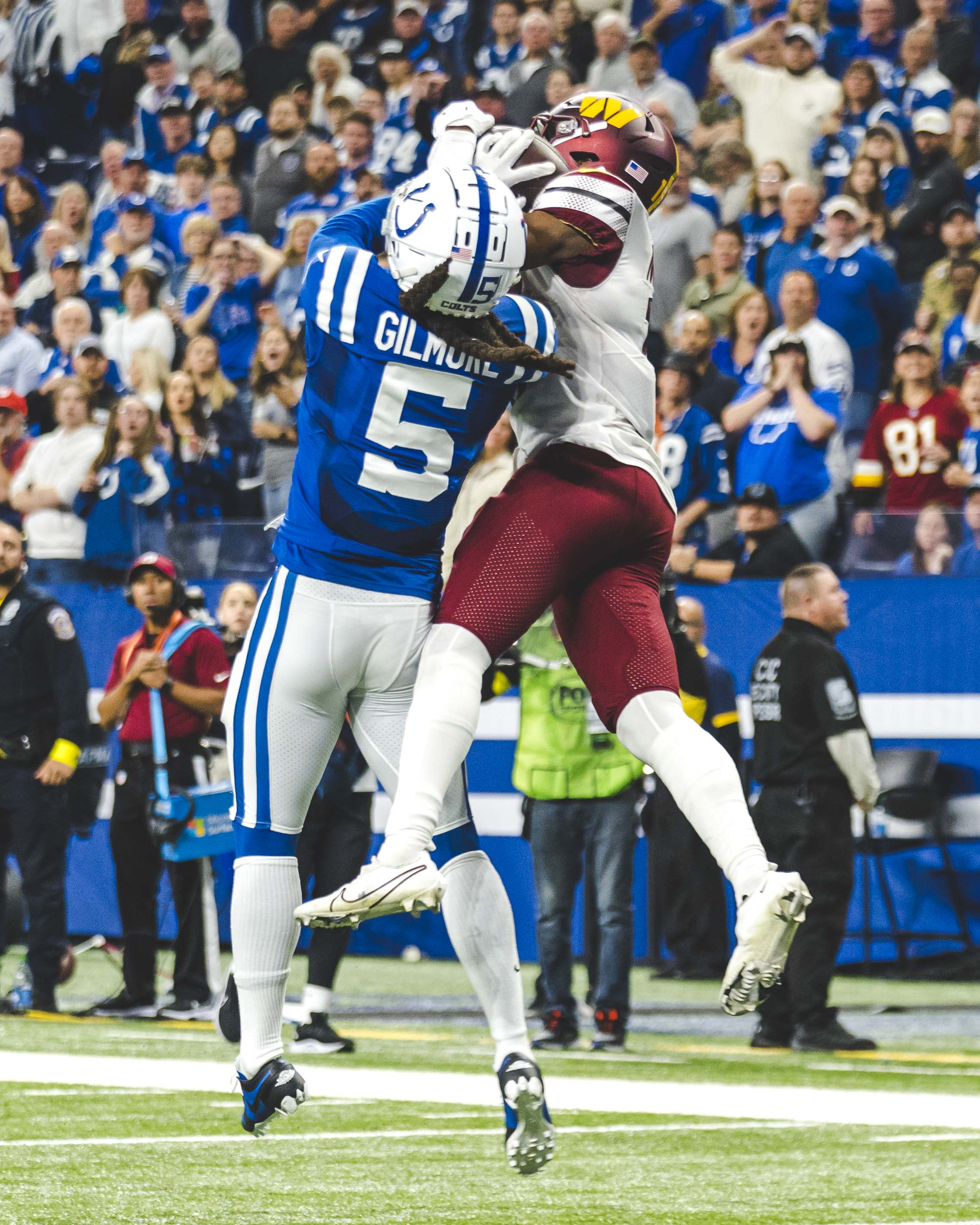
Gilmore in 2022

On April 18, 2022, the Indianapolis Colts signed Gilmore to a two-year, $20 million contract with $14 million guaranteed, $9.51 million guaranteed upon signing, and an initial signing bonus of $4 million. The contract had incentives that increase the possible maximum value to $23 million. He entered training camp slated as a starting cornerback following the departure of Xavier Rhodes and Rock Ya-Sin. Head coach Frank Reich named Gilmore the No. 1 starting cornerback to begin the season and paired him with Kenny Moore II.

Gilmore made his Colts debut in the season-opener against the Texans on the road and finished the 20–20 tie with three solo tackles. In the next game against the Jaguars, Gilmore recorded five solo tackles and a pass deflection during the 24–0 shutout road loss. The following week against the Chiefs, he once again had five solo tackles and a pass deflection in the 20–17 victory.

During a Week 5 12–9 overtime road victory over the Broncos on Thursday Night Football, Gilmore recorded five combined tackles (four solo), two pass deflections, and his first interception of the season off a pass by Russell Wilson to wide receiver Tyrie Cleveland. During Week 10 against the Raiders, Gilmore had five combined tackles (two solo) and two pass deflections in the 25–20 road victory. Two weeks later against the Steelers on Monday Night Football, he recorded a season-high seven combined tackles (four solo) during the 24–17 loss.

During Week 13 against the Cowboys on Sunday Night Football, Gilmore had six combined tackles (five solo), two pass deflections, and an interception in the 54–19 loss. Two weeks later against the Minnesota Vikings, he tied his season-high of seven combined tackles (six solo) while also recording a season-high three pass deflections in the 39–36 overtime road loss. Gilmore was inactive for the regular season-finale against the Texans due to a wrist injury.

Gilmore finished the 2022 season with a then career-high 66 combined tackles (53 solo), 11 pass deflections, and two interceptions in 16 games and starts. He received an overall grade of 79.1 from Pro Football Focus, which ranked ninth amongst all qualifying cornerbacks in 2022. Gilmore completed the season with a coverage grade of 81.1 from PFF.

=== Dallas Cowboys ===
On March 14, 2023, Gilmore was traded to the Dallas Cowboys in exchange for a compensatory fifth-round selection (#176-Evan Hull) in the 2023 NFL draft. The Cowboys acquired him due to an injury to Jourdan Lewis that required surgery and the departure of Anthony Brown. Gilmore entered training camp slated as a starting cornerback under defensive coordinator Dan Quinn. Head coach Mike McCarthy named Gilmore a starting cornerback to begin the season and paired him with Trevon Diggs.

Gilmore made his Cowboys debut during the season-opening 40–0 shutout road victory over the Giants and finished with four solo tackles, a season-high three pass deflections, and his first interception of the season off a pass attempt thrown by Daniel Jones to tight end Darren Waller. Two weeks later against the Cardinals, Gilmore recorded three combined tackles (two solo) and a pass deflection in the 28–16 road loss. A few days before the game, All-Pro cornerback Trevon Diggs suffered a season-ending torn ACL in practice, resulting in Gilmore being paired with DaRon Bland.

During Week 5 against the 49ers on Sunday Night Football, Gilmore had six combined tackles (five solo) and a pass deflection in the 42–10 road loss. In the next game against the Chargers on Monday Night Football, he recorded three solo tackles, a pass deflection, and an interception during the 20–17 road victory. Following a Week 7 bye, the Cowboys returned home to face the Rams. Gilmore finished the 43–20 victory with four solo tackles and a pass deflection.

During a Week 10 49–17 victory over the Giants, Gilmore recorded a solo tackle and two pass deflections. Two weeks later against the Washington Commanders on Thanksgiving, he had six combined tackles (four solo) and a pass deflection in the 45–10 victory. In the next game against the Seattle Seahawks on Thursday Night Football, Gilmore recorded a tackle and a pass deflection during the 41–35 victory.

During Week 14 against the Eagles on Sunday Night Football, Gilmore had a season-high nine solo tackles and a forced fumble in the 33–13 victory. In the next game against his former team, the Bills, Gilmore recorded five combined tackles (two solo) and a pass deflection during the 31–10 road loss. During the regular-season finale against the Commanders, he had six solo tackles and a pass deflection before leaving the eventual 38–10 victory in the third quarter with a torn labrum.

Gilmore finished the 2023 season with a career-high 68 combined tackles (54 solo), 13 pass deflections, two interceptions, and a forced fumble in 17 games and starts. He received an overall grade of 71.2 from Pro Football Focus in 2023. The Cowboys finished atop the NFC East with a 12–5 record and qualified for the playoffs as the #2-seed. During the Wild Card Round against the Packers, Gilmore returned from injury and finished the 48–32 loss with five combined tackles (four solo).

=== Minnesota Vikings ===
On August 18, 2024, the Minnesota Vikings signed Gilmore to a one-year, fully-guaranteed $7 million contract that included an initial signing bonus of $3.5 million and had a maximum value of $10 million with incentives. The move reunited him with defensive coordinator Brian Flores, who was the linebackers coach with the Patriots. Upon arrival to training camp, Gilmore was slated as the de facto No. 1 starting cornerback. He was named the No. 1 starting cornerback to begin the season and was the with Byron Murphy.

Gilmore made his Vikings debut during the season opener against the Giants and finished the 28–6 road victory with four combined tackles (three solo). In the next game against the 49ers, Gilmore had a season-high six combined tackles (five solo) during the 23–17 victory. Two weeks later against the Packers, he recorded a pass deflection in the narrow 31–29 road victory.

During a Week 6 23–17 victory over the Jets in London, Gilmore tied his season-high of six combined tackles (five solo) while also recording a season-high two pass deflections and his first interception of the season off a pass attempt thrown by Aaron Rodgers to wide receiver Mike Williams. Three weeks later against the Rams on Thursday Night Football, Gilmore had five combined tackles (four solo) and a pass deflection in the 30–20 road loss. In the next game against his former team, the Colts, Gilmore recorded three combined tackles (one solo) and a pass deflection during the 21–13 victory.

During Week 12 against the Bears, Gilmore had five combined tackles (two solo) and a pass deflection in the 30–27 overtime road victory. In the next game against the Cardinals, he recorded two combined tackles (one solo) and a pass deflection before leaving the eventual narrow 23–22 victory during the second quarter with a hamstring injury. Gilmore missed the next two games as a result. He returned from injury in Week 16 against the Seahawks and finished the 27–24 road victory with two combined tackles (one solo) and tying his season-high of two pass deflections.

Gilmore finished the 2024 season with 56 combined tackles (40 solo), nine pass deflections, and an interception in 15 games and starts. He received an overall grade of 63.9 from Pro Football Focus, which ranked 94th amongst 222 qualifying cornerbacks in 2024. The Vikings finished second in the NFC North with a 14–3 record and qualified for the playoffs as the #5-seed. During the Wild Card Round against the Rams, Gilmore recorded two combined tackles (one solo) and a pass deflection in the 27–9 road loss.

=== Retirement ===
On April 2, 2026, Gilmore announced his retirement on his Instagram account after not playing the entire 2025 season.

On September 18, 2026, the day before his 36th birthday, Gilmore officially signed a one-day contract to retire as a member of the Patriots.

== NFL career statistics ==
Legend
	NFL Defensive Player of the Year
	Won the Super Bowl
	Led the league
**Bold**	Career high

=== Regular season ===
Year	Team	Games		Tackles				Interceptions						Fumbles	
Year	Team	GP	GS	Comb	Solo	Ast	Sack	PD	Int	Yds	Avg	Lng	TD	FF	FR
2012	BUF	16	16	61	52	9	0.0	16	1	23	23.0	0	0	**2**	0
2013	BUF	11	9	35	30	5	0.0	10	2	0	0.0	0	0	0	**1**
2014	BUF	14	14	46	38	8	0.0	6	3	61	20.3	27	0	1	0
2015	BUF	12	12	36	36	0	0.0	18	3	33	11.0	29	0	0	0
2016	BUF	15	15	48	42	6	0.0	12	5	**135**	27.0	49	0	0	0
2017	NE	13	13	50	47	3	0.0	9	2	59	**29.5**	39	0	0	0
2018	NE	16	16	45	40	5	**1.0**	**20**	2	0	0.0	0	0	**2**	**1**
2019	NE	16	16	53	44	9	0.0	**20**	**6**	126	21.0	**64T**	**2**	0	**1**
2020	NE	11	11	37	30	7	0.0	3	1	15	15.0	15	0	1	0
2021	CAR	8	3	16	15	1	0.0	2	2	13	6.5	13	0	0	0
2022	IND	16	16	66	53	13	0.0	11	2	31	15.5	31	0	0	0
2023	DAL	17	17	**68**	**54**	14	0.0	13	2	0	0.0	0	0	1	0
2024	MIN	15	15	56	40	**16**	0.0	9	1	0	0.0	0	0	0	0
Career		180	173	617	521	96	1.0	149	32	496	15.5	64T	2	7	3

=== Postseason ===
Year	Team	Games		Tackles				Interceptions						Fumbles	
Year	Team	GP	GS	Comb	Solo	Ast	Sack	PD	Int	Yds	Avg	Lng	TD	FF	FR
2017	NE	3	3	**10**	**9**	**1**	0.0	**6**	0	0	0.0	0	0	0	0
2018	NE	3	3	7	7	0	0.0	5	**2**	0	0.0	0	0	**1**	0
2019	NE	1	1	2	2	0	0.0	0	0	0	0.0	0	0	0	0
2023	DAL	1	1	5	4	**1**	0.0	0	0	0	0.0	0	0	0	0
2024	MIN	1	1	2	1	**1**	0.0	1	0	0	0.0	0	0	0	0
Career		9	9	26	23	3	0.0	12	2	0	0.0	0	0	1	0

== Personal life ==
Gilmore is the son of Linda and Steve Gilmore. His younger brother, Steven, played cornerback for Marshall. Gilmore grew up as a fan of the Dallas Cowboys, and upon joining the team, surprised his uncle with the news, much to both of their excitement.

On July 12, 2014, Gilmore married his college sweetheart, Gabrielle Glenn. They have three children together: Sebastian, Gael and Gisele. Gabrielle, also an athlete, was a collegiate sprinter for University of South Carolina.
