= Rock Hill High School (South Carolina) =

Location
- 320 West Springdale Road; Rock Hill, South Carolina 29730; United States; 34°54′09″N 80°58′48″W

Information
- Type: Public high school
- Motto: Carpe Diem Latin for, Take Advantage for the Day
- Established: 1888 (138 years ago)
- School district: Rock Hill Schools
- Principal: Ozzie Ahl
- Teaching staff: 118.00 (FTE)
- Grades: 9–12
- Enrollment: 1,980 (2024-2025)
- Student to teacher ratio: 16.78
- Campus type: Suburban
- Colors: Garnet and black
- Mascot: Bearcat
- Website: rhhs.rock-hill.k12.sc.us

Rock Hill High School (RHHS) is the first of the three high schools in Rock Hill, South Carolina. A part of Rock Hill Schools, it offers the International Baccalaureate diploma to its senior class students, as well as dual credit and Advanced Placement. As of February 2016, RHHS has approximately 2,000 students in grades 9–12.

== Athletics ==
Rock Hill High offers a number of sports, including baseball, women's and men's basketball, cheerleading, cross country, football, golf, women's and men's soccer, softball, swimming, women's and men's tennis, track and field, wrestling, and volleyball. Its sports teams are known as the Bearcats and compete in Region 3-AAAAA of the South Carolina High School League (SCHSL).

The athletic teams have achieved considerable success. The Bearcats wrestling team is recognized as a traditional South Carolina powerhouse, having won 19 team state championships. Rock Hill High SCHSL team accomplishments are listed below.

=== Football ===
- AA Champions: 1945, 1946, 1953
- AAAA Division 1 Champions: 2002, 2004

=== Baseball ===
- AAA Baseball Champions: 1967

=== Basketball ===
- AAAA (Boy's) Champions: 2006
- AAAAA (Girl's) Champions: 2022

=== Cross Country ===
- AAAA (Boy's) Champions: 1990

=== Tennis ===
- AAAA (Boy's) Champions: 1971
- AAAAA (Girl's) State Champions: 2017

=== Men’s Wrestling ===
- AAAAA Champions: 2018
- AAAA Champions: 1980, 1982, 1983, 1984, 1985, 1986, 1989, 1990, 1991, 1994, 1995, 1996, 1997, 1999, 2000, 2009, 2014, 2015

=== Women’s Wrestling ===
- AAAAA Champions:

2023, 2024, 2025

=== Golf ===
- AAAAA (Boy's) Champions: 2018

== Notable alumni ==
- Phillip Adams, NFL cornerback
- Bob Bolin, MLB pitcher
- Gerald Dixon, NFL linebacker
- Tori Gurley, NFL and CFL wide receiver
- Jonathan Hefney, NFL and CFL defensive back, two-time CFL All-Star selection
- Jim Hoagland, two-time Pulitzer Prize winning journalist
- Chris Hope, NFL safety, 2008 Pro Bowl selection and Super Bowl XL champion with the Pittsburgh Steelers
- Jonathan Meeks, NFL safety
- Ralph Norman, US representative from South Carolina's 5th congressional district
- Robbie Ouzts, NFL fullback
- Tommy Pope, solicitor and politician
- Keith Richardson, professional tennis player
- Leon Rippy, actor
- Jaleel Scott, NFL wide receiver
- Ko Simpson, NFL safety
- Arkee Whitlock, NFL and CFL running back
