= South Pointe High School (Rock Hill, South Carolina) =

Location
- 801 Neely Road; Rock Hill, South Carolina 29730; United States; 34°53′17″N 81°03′38″W

Information
- Type: Public high school
- Motto: Living the South Pointe Way! Integrity, Community & Excellence
- Established: 2005 (21 years ago)
- School district: Rock Hill Schools
- Principal: Valarie Williams (2021–present)
- Staff: 77.50 (FTE)
- Grades: 9–12
- Enrollment: 1,181 (2023-2024)
- Student to teacher ratio: 15.24
- Campus type: Suburban
- Colors: Red, silver, and white
- Nickname: Stallions
- Newspaper: Spin Wired
- Yearbook: Equestrian
- Website: sphs.rock-hill.k12.sc.us

South Pointe High School is the third and newest high school in Rock Hill, South Carolina, USA. The school is part of York County School District Three (Rock Hill Schools). It has an enrollment of approximately 1,196 students in grades 9–12.

== Athletics ==
From 2010–2012, South Pointe Athletics competed in Region 4 of AAA along with Chester High, Fairfield Central High, Fort Mill High, Nation Ford High and York Comprehensive High. In 2011, it was announced by the SC High School League that South Pointe would move to AAAA and compete in Region 3 with the other 6 York County, SC high schools (Clover, Fort Mill, Nation Ford, Northwestern, Rock Hill, and York Comprehensive) as well as Lancaster. In 2013, it was announced that the Stallions will be moved backed down to AAA athletics.

South Pointe's teams are the Stallions. Boys' sports include: baseball, basketball, cross country, American football, golf, soccer, swimming, tennis, track & field, and wrestling; while girls' sports include: basketball, cheerleading, cross country, dance, golf, soccer, softball, swimming, track & field, and volleyball.

=== Football ===
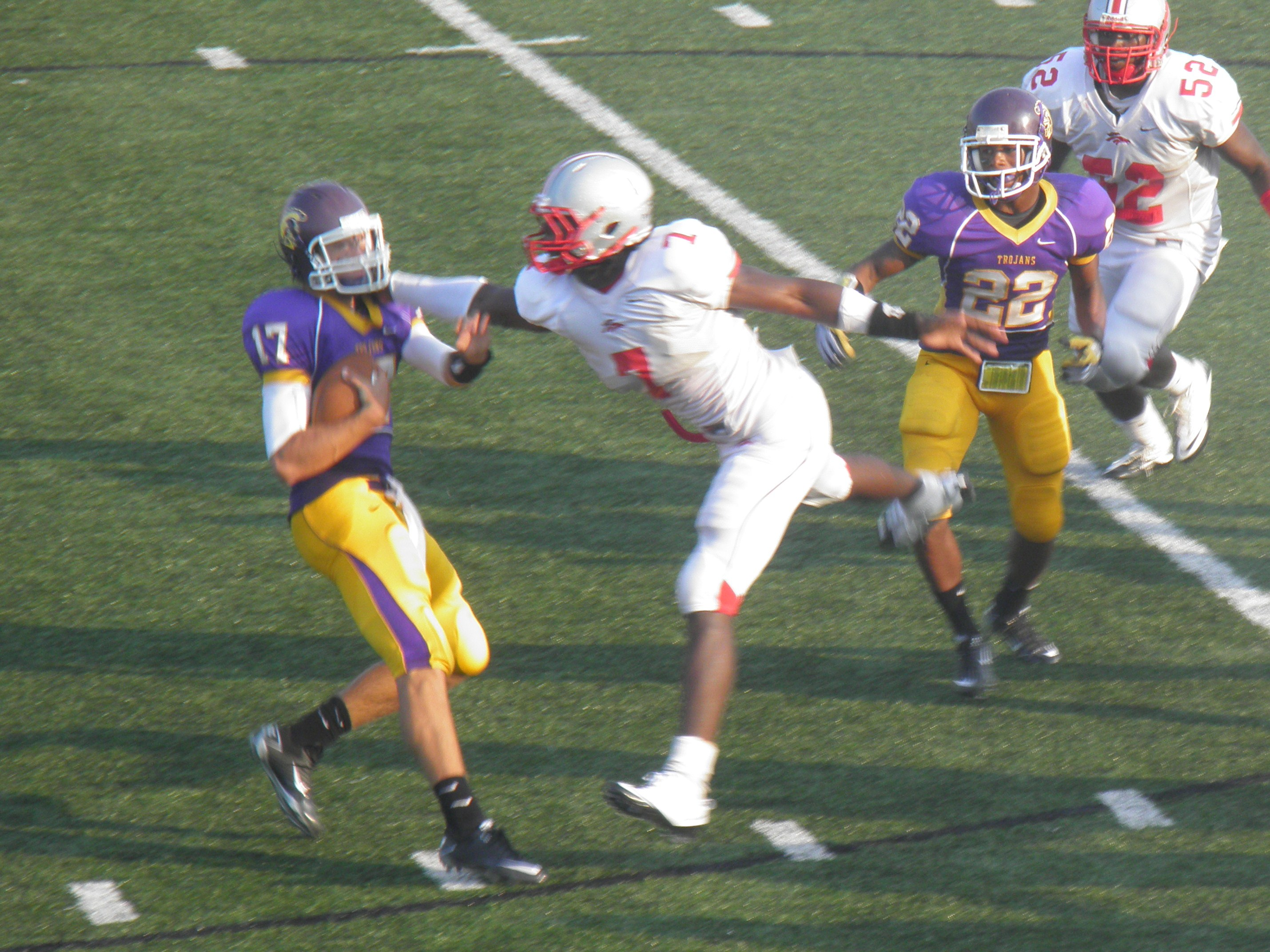
South Carolina signee Jadeveon Clowney attempts to sack Tennessee signee Justin Worley on August 28, 2010

South Pointe has seen great success on the gridiron in the limited time the school has been around. They struggled in the first two varsity years in 2006 and 2007. They then broke out with an undefeated 15–0 record in 2008, winning the Division II AAAA state championship. They lost in the AAAA upper state championship in 2009 and suffered a defeat in the 2010 AAA state championship. They won their second state championship in the 2011 AAA state championship going 14–1 that year. The Stallions made it back to the 2012 AAAA upper state championship before being defeated by Greenwood High School 35–31. South Pointe's Varsity is coached by Bobby Collins, Collins is the school's fourth football coach since South Pointe opened in 2005.

=== Swimming ===
The Stallion Swim Team competes in Region IV–AAA and are under supervision by Head Coach Adam Rainey. The Lady Stallion Swim Team has compiled a 21–3 record in Rainey's three seasons with the team. They have consistently broken and reset new school records (45 to date). Seven female swimmers have found national placement as of 2012. Izzi Woodard is the school's first female state champion and swim champion for South Pointe High. She won the Women's 100 yard Breaststroke at the 2011 AAA State Finals in Columbia, SC.

=== Athletic honors ===
Football

- Division II AAAA State Championship: 2008, 2016, 2017, 2021, 2025
- Division ll AAA State Championship: 2011, 2014, 2015

Cross Country

- AAAA State Championship: 2025

Swimming

- Division II AAA State Qualifier: 2011

== Academics ==
South Pointe offers a wide variety of courses which range from Foreign Language, Computers, Engineering, Art, and core classes; also offered are Honors, AP (Advanced Placement), Dual Credit, and IB (International Baccalaureate).

== School newspaper ==
South Pointe has a school newspaper, "SPiN" (South Pointe in the News). In addition, South Pointe added an online version to their paper copy of the newspaper, called "SPiN WIRED" in 2009. The site is said to display the latest news, sports, pictures and more from the school and throughout the community.

== Notable alumni ==
- O'Mega Blake — college football wide receiver for the Arkansas Razorbacks
- Jadeveon Clowney — NFL defensive end, 3x Pro Bowl selection, 2014 NFL draft 1st overall pick
- Montay Crockett — professional American football wide receiver
- J'Zavien Currence — college football safety for the South Carolina Gamecocks
- Stephon Gilmore — NFL cornerback, 5x Pro Bowl selection, Super Bowl LIII champion for the New England Patriots, 2019 AP NFL Defensive Player of the Year
- Steven Gilmore Jr. — NFL cornerback, younger brother of Stephon Gilmore
- DeVonte Holloman — NFL linebacker
- Anthony Johnson — professional CFL wide receiver
- Derion Kendrick — NFL cornerback, 2x CFP national champion
- Jaylen Mahoney — NFL safety
- Nick McCloud — NFL cornerback
