= Clarendon County School District 1 =

School district in South Carolina, United States

Location
- 12 South Church Street, Summerton, SC 29148

District information
- Superintendent: Barbara Champagne

Clarendon County School District 1 is located in Clarendon County, South Carolina, United States. State legislation has been passed to amalgamate the three school districts in Clarendon County.

== See also ==
- Clarendon County School District 2
