= Dillon School District Four =

School district in South Carolina, United States

Address
- 1738 Highway 301 North Dillon, South Carolina, 29536; United States

District information
- Type: Public
- Grades: PreK–12
- NCES District ID: 4501920

Students and staff
- Students: 3,901
- Teachers: 229.0
- Staff: 281.4
- Student–teacher ratio: 17.03

Other information
- Website: www.dillon.k12.sc.us

Dillon School District Four is a school district headquartered in Dillon, South Carolina. The district has over 4,000 students in nine schools.

== Schools ==
- Lake View High School (6–12)
- Dillon High School (9–12)
- Dillon Middle School (6–8)
- Elementary schools
  - Pre K-5
    - Lake View Elementary School
  - 4–5
    - Gordon Elementary School
  - Pre K-3
    - East Elementary School
    - South Elementary School
    - Stewart Heights Elementary School
