= Rock Hill Schools =

Public school district in South Carolina, United States

York County School District 3 (Rock Hill School District)

Address
- 386 E Black Street Rock Hill, South Carolina, 29731; United States

District information
- Grades: PreK–12
- Superintendent: Dr. Tommy Schmolze
- Accreditation: Southern Association of Colleges and Schools
- NCES District ID: 4503870

Students and staff
- Enrollment: 17,594 (2019-2020)
- Student–teacher ratio: 14.07

Other information
- Website: www.rock-hill.k12.sc.us

York County School District 3 (also known as Rock Hill Schools) is the largest of the four public school districts in York County, South Carolina, United States. The district serves students in and around the city of Rock Hill, approximately 20 miles south of Charlotte, North Carolina.

== School Board ==
Title	Name
Superintendent	Dr. Tommy Schmolze
Chairperson - Seat 2	Helena Miller
Vice-Chair - Seat 4	Pete Nosal
Community Volunteer - Seat 1	Patrice Reid Cherry
Retired Public School Teacher - Seat 3	Mildred Douglas
Medical Sales Representative - Seat At Large	Bryan McAlinden
General Manager - Seat At Large	James Burns
Volunteer Resource Manager	Windy Cole

== Schools ==
=== Elementary schools ===
- Belleview Elementary (Closed and converted)
- Children's School at Sylvia Circle
- Cherry Park Elementary School of Language Immersion
- Ebenezer Avenue Elementary
- Ebinport Elementary
- Finley Road Elementary (Closed and converted)
- Independence Elementary
- India Hook Elementary
- Lesslie Elementary
- Mount Gallant Elementary
- Mount Holly Elementary
- Northside Elementary School of the Arts
- Oakdale Elementary
- Old Pointe Elementary
- Richmond Drive Elementary
- Sunset Park Center for Accelerated Studies
- York Road Elementary
- Rock Hill Schools Virtual Academy

=== Middle schools ===
- Castle Heights Middle School
- Dutchman Creek Middle School
- Rawlinson Road Middle School
- Saluda Trail Middle School
- Sullivan Middle School
- Rock Hill Schools Virtual Academy

=== High schools ===
- Northwestern High School
- Rock Hill High School
- South Pointe High School
- Rock Hill Schools Virtual Academy
