= Clarendon County School District 2 =

School district in South Carolina, United States

Address
- 15 Major Dr. Manning, Clarendon County, South Carolina, 29102; United States

District information
- Superintendent: Dr. Shawn Johnson

Other information
- Website: www.clarendon2.k12.sc.us

Clarendon County School District 2 is located in Clarendon County, South Carolina, United States.

== See also ==
- Clarendon County School District 1
