= Dillon High School =

Location
- Dillon, Dillon County, South Carolina 29536; United States; 34.434284°N 79.355279°W

Information
- Type: Public secondary school
- Established: 1896
- School district: Dillon School District Four
- NCES District ID: 4501920
- Superintendent: D. Ray Rogers
- School code: SC-1704-005
- CEEB code: 410645
- NCES School ID: 450192000385
- Principal: Timothy Gibbs
- Faculty: 48.00 (on an FTE basis)
- Grades: 9–12
- Enrollment: 824 (2023-2024)
  - Grade 9: 237
  - Grade 10: 249
  - Grade 11: 189
  - Grade 12: 149
- Student to teacher ratio: 17.17
- Colors: Black and gold
- Nickname: Wildcats
- Nobel laureates: Ben Bernanke
- Website: www.dillon.k12.sc.us/schools/dillon_high_school

Dillon High School is a public high school in Dillon, South Carolina, United States. It is a part of Dillon School District Four. It is located on 1730 Highway 301 North, approximately 5 miles (8 km) from the border of North Carolina and South Carolina. It is the home of the Dillon Wildcats. The current schoolhouse was built in 1970, with additions in 2000. The school itself dates back to the late 1800s, with portions of 1896 and 1910 buildings still in use for other educational purposes. Timothy Gibbs serves the school as principal, and D. Ray Rogers is the superintendent of the school's district.

== Notable alumni ==
- Josiah Thompson, college football offensive tackle for the South Carolina Gamecocks
