= Chris Hope (American football) =

American football player (born 1980)

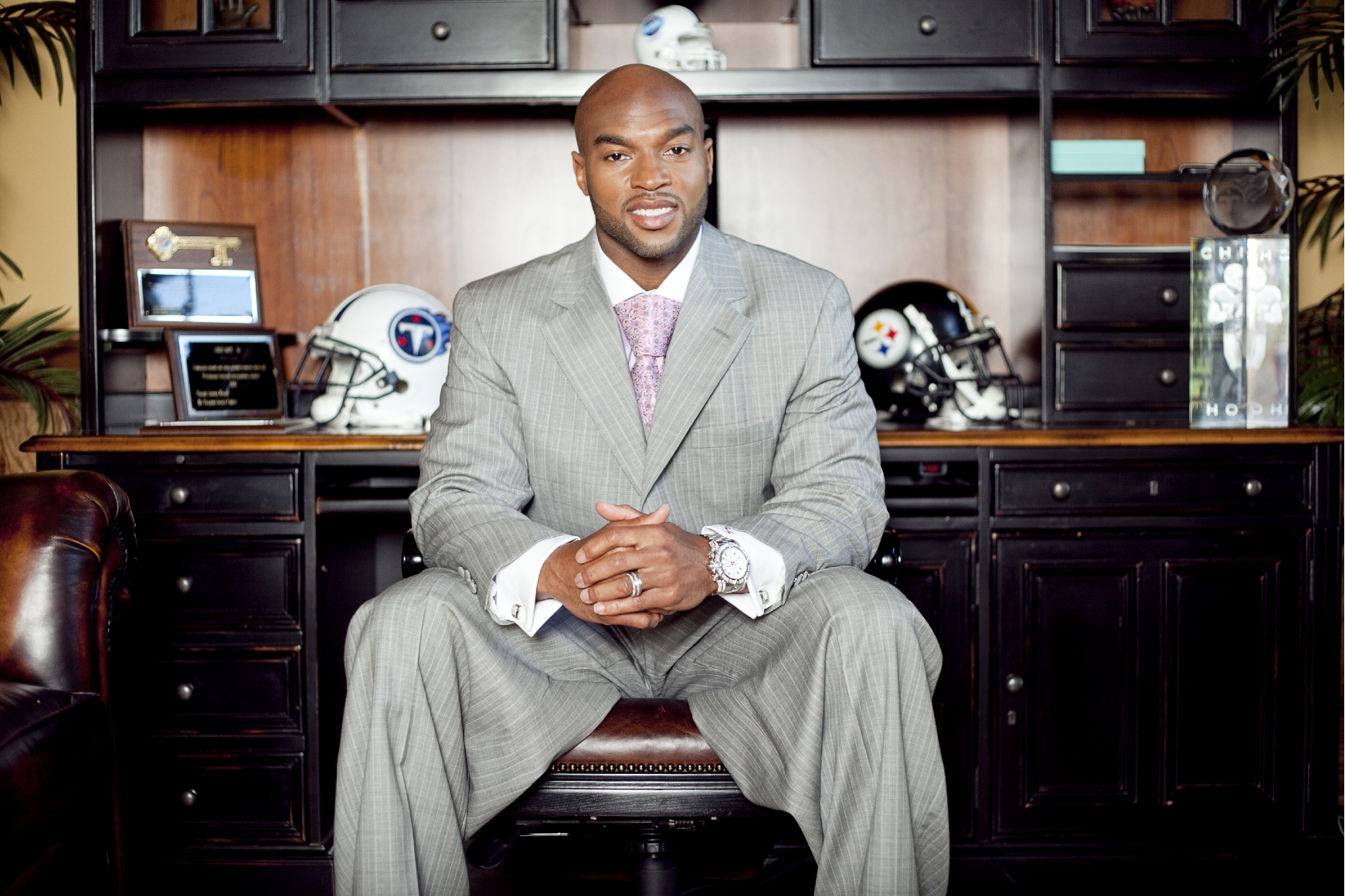
- Hope in 2013

No. 28, 24, 36
- Position: Safety

Personal information
- Born: September 29, 1980 (age 46); Rock Hill, South Carolina, U.S.
- Listed height: 6 ft 0 in (1.83 m)
- Listed weight: 208 lb (94 kg)

Career information
- High school: Rock Hill
- College: Florida State
- NFL draft: 2002: 3rd round, 94th overall pick

Career history
- Pittsburgh Steelers (2002–2005); Tennessee Titans (2006–2011); Atlanta Falcons (2012); Detroit Lions (2013)*
- * Offseason or practice squad member only

Awards and highlights
- Super Bowl champion (XL); Pro Bowl (2008); BCS national champion (1999); First-team All-ACC (2001); Second-team All-ACC (2000)

Career NFL statistics
- Total tackles: 730
- Sacks: 4
- Forced fumbles: 4
- Fumble recoveries: 8
- Interceptions: 20
- Total touchdowns: 2
- Stats at Pro Football Reference

Christopher Pierre Hope (born September 29, 1980) is an American former professional football player who was a safety in the National Football League (NFL). He played college football for the Florida State Seminoles. Hope was selected by the Pittsburgh Steelers in the third round of the 2002 NFL draft, and has also played for the Tennessee Titans and Atlanta Falcons. He helped the Steelers win Super Bowl XL.

== Early life ==
Hope was a USA Today All-USA first-team and Parade All-American selection as a senior at Rock Hill High School. During his high school career, Hope recorded 114 tackles and three interceptions as a defensive back while rushing for 1,319 yards and 20 touchdowns as a running back. He totaled 464 tackles, 10 interceptions and four fumble recoveries during his four-year varsity career and established a school record as he started 55-straight games during his star-studded prep career.

Ranked as a No. 1 defensive back prospect in the nation by Prep Star and rated a No. 3 defensive back and No. 50 overall prospect in America by National Recruiting Advisor, he was a member of Atlanta Journal-Constitution Super Southern 1000. He was selected to Orlando Sentinel All-Southern team. Hope was rated as a No. 1 defensive back recruit nationally by Tampa Tribune and ranked as sixth-best recruit nationally by St. Petersburg Times. He recorded 114 tackles and three interceptions as a defensive back while rushing for 1,319 yards and 20 touchdowns as a running back.

== College career ==
While attending Florida State University, Hope played for the Florida State Seminoles football team. In 1998, freshman year, he played in every game at free safety, recording 34 tackles, with a pair of pass deflections, a fumble recovery, and a forced fumble. In 1999, Sophomore year, he played in every game, starting the final six contests at free safety recording 41 tackles, with two stops for losses of 4 yards, and a forced fumble. He also tied for the team lead with four interceptions for 17 yards in returns.

In 2000, junior year, Hope started all year at free safety. He was fourth on the team with 83 tackles, including five stops for losses of 10 yards, intercepted two passes and deflected eight others, recovered and caused a fumble. In 2001, senior year, he started every game at free safety. He recorded 76 tackles with nine pass deflections and three interceptions.

== Professional career ==
=== Pittsburgh Steelers ===
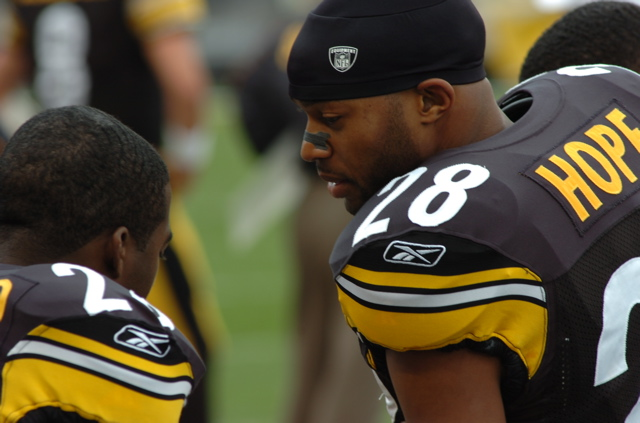
Chris Hope during a game in 2005 (right).

Hope was selected in the third round number 94th overall by the Pittsburgh Steelers for the 2002 season. He started out the 2002 season on special teams and became a strong special teams player. In an October 27 game against the Baltimore Ravens he caused a fumble on a second quarter kickoff that led to a touchdown. He got to play his first extensive game on November 24, 2002, against Cincinnati due to injuries in the Steelers secondary picking up three tackles and one special teams tackle. The 2003 season was not much different from his first. Hope played mainly special teams.

In an October 26, 2003, game against St. Louis he delivered a crushing block to free Antwaan Randle El to return a punt 84 yards. In 2004, Hope became the starting free safety for the Pittsburgh Steelers. Chris Hope would pick up 58 tackles forcing one fumble, four pass deflections, and intercept one pass with a return of 41 yards. In 2005, Hope would once again start as free safety for the Pittsburgh Steelers. He had 69 tackles forcing one fumble, and he picked off three passes with a total of 60 return yards. Hope was one of the many who helped the Pittsburgh Steelers reach and win Super Bowl XL.

=== Tennessee Titans ===
Shortly thereafter, Hope signed a six-year contract with the Tennessee Titans. In his first year, he led the team with five interceptions and 128 tackles. In a 2007 game against Cincinnati, Hope suffered a spinal cord injury that ended his season and required surgery in the offseason.

=== Atlanta Falcons ===
On June 29, 2012, Hope signed with the Atlanta Falcons. Hope made his mark with special teams leading with team tackles.

=== Detroit Lions ===
Hope was signed by the Detroit Lions on June 24, 2013. With the signing, he was reunited with head coach Jim Schwartz. Hope was coached by Schwartz in Tennessee, where he earned a pro bowl spot in 2008.

On August 25, 2013, Hope was released by the Detroit Lions.

== NFL career statistics ==
Year	Team	GP	Tackles				Fumbles			Interceptions					
Year	Team	GP	Cmb	Solo	Ast	Sck	FF	FR	Yds	Int	Yds	Avg	Lng	TD	PD
2002	PIT	14	23	19	4	0.0	0	1	0	0	0	0.0	0	0	0
2003	PIT	16	27	22	5	0.0	0	0	0	0	0	0.0	0	0	1
2004	PIT	16	89	58	31	0.0	1	0	0	1	41	41.0	41	0	5
2005	PIT	16	96	69	27	0.0	1	1	0	3	60	20.0	55	0	3
2006	TEN	16	121	89	32	0.0	0	1	0	5	105	21.0	61	1	15
2007	TEN	11	49	37	12	0.0	0	1	0	2	45	22.5	45	0	3
2008	TEN	16	78	63	15	1.0	0	0	0	4	53	13.3	39	0	8
2009	TEN	16	81	67	14	2.0	1	0	0	3	24	8.0	24	0	7
2010	TEN	16	101	87	14	1.0	1	1	0	1	32	32.0	32	0	5
2011	TEN	10	25	23	2	0.0	0	2	0	1	7	7.0	7	0	1
2012	ATL	16	26	18	8	0.0	0	1	0	0	0	0.0	0	0	0
Career		163	716	552	164	4.0	4	8	0	20	367	18.4	61	1	48

== Personal life ==
Hope founded the iCHOPE Charitable Fund to support volunteerism and charitable efforts in his hometown of Rock Hill, SC.

His cousin, Gerald Dixon, played linebacker for nine seasons (1993–2001) in the NFL with the Cleveland Browns, Cincinnati Bengals and San Diego Chargers.

Hope is a Christian. His favorite Bible verses are Romans 5:3-4 - Not only so, but we also glory in our sufferings, because we know that suffering produces perseverance; perseverance, character; and character, hope. In 2018, he wrote and released a book, P.R.O.S., which gives practical and Biblical advice for a Christ-centered life.

Hope is married to Linda De La Cruz Hope, proprietor of The L in Luxury Real Estate. They have two children.

== Bibliography ==
- Hope, Chris (2018). P.R.O.S. Fedd Books. ISBN 978-1-94321-795-3.
