= List of South Carolina Gamecocks head football coaches =

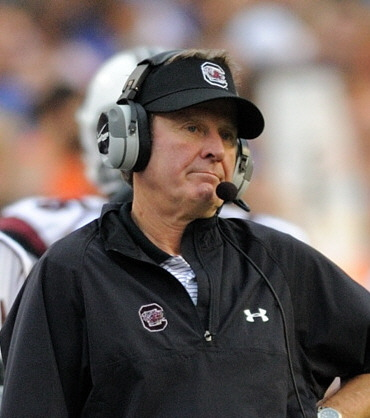
Steve Spurrier, 32nd head coach of the South Carolina Gamecocks

The South Carolina Gamecocks college football team represents the University of South Carolina in the Southeastern Conference (SEC). The Gamecocks compete as part of the National Collegiate Athletic Association (NCAA) Division I Football Bowl Subdivision. The school has had 36 head coaches since it began play during the 1892 season. Steve Spurrier, who served as South Carolina's 32nd head coach from 2005 to 2015, is the winningest head coach in program history. South Carolina's 36th and current head coach is Shane Beamer.

Nine coaches have led the Gamecocks to postseason bowl games: John D. McMillan, Paul Dietzel, Jim Carlen, Joe Morrison, Brad Scott, Lou Holtz, Steve Spurrier, Will Muschamp and Shane Beamer. Paul Dietzel led South Carolina to the 1969 Atlantic Coast Conference (ACC) championship. Joe Morrison won the Walter Camp Coach of the Year Award in 1984. Steve Spurrier is the leader in games won with 86 victories during his 10 years with the Gamecocks. Of all coaches who coached more than one game, Douglas McKay has the highest winning percentage with 1.000, and W. P. Murphy and Mike Bobo have the lowest winning percentage with .000. Steve Spurrier and Lou Holtz have been inducted into the College Football Hall of Fame.

== Key ==
Key to symbols in coaches list
General		Overall		Conference		Postseason (Note: Although the first Rose Bowl Game was played in 1902, it has been continuously played since the 1916 game, and is recognized as the oldest bowl game by the NCAA. "—" indicates any season prior to 1916 when postseason games were not played.)	
No.	Order of coaches (Note: A running total of the number of head coaches, with coaches who served separate tenures being counted only once. Interim head coaches are represented with "Int" and are not counted in the running total. "—" indicates the team played but either without a coach or no coach is on record. "X" indicates an interim year without play.)	GC	Games coached	CW	Conference wins	PW	Postseason wins
DC	Division championships	OW	Overall wins	CL	Conference losses	PL	Postseason losses
CC	Conference championships	OL	Overall losses	CT	Conference ties	PT	Postseason ties
NC	National championships	OT	Overall ties (Note: Overtime rules in college football were introduced in 1996, making ties impossible in the period since.)	C%	Conference winning percentage		
†	Elected to the College Football Hall of Fame	O%	Overall winning percentage (Note: When computing the win–loss percentage, a tie counts as half a win and half a loss.)				

== Coaches ==
List of head football coaches showing season(s) coached, overall records, conference records, postseason records, championships and selected awards (Note: Statistics correct as of the end of the 2025 NCAA Division I FBS football season.)
No.	Name (Note: South Carolina did not have a head coach for the 1892, 1894 or 1895 seasons.)	Term (Note: South Carolina did not field a team for the 1893 or 1906 seasons.)	GC	OW	OL	OT	O%	CW	CL	CT	C%	PW	PL	PT	DC (Note: Divisional champions have advanced to the SEC Championship Game since the institution of divisional play beginning in the 1992 season. Since that time, South Carolina has competed as a member of the SEC East.)	CC	NC	Awards
1	Richard S. Whaley	1896	4	1	3	0	0.250	—	—	—	—	—	—	—	—	—	0	—
2	Frederick M. Murphy	1897	3	0	3	0	.000	—	—	—	—	—	—	—	—	—	0	—
3	Bill Wertenbaker	1898	3	1	2	0	0.333	—	—	—	—	—	—	—	—	—	0	—
4	Irving O. Hunt	1899–1900	12	6	6	0	0.500	—	—	—	—	—	—	—	—	—	0	—
5	Byron W. Dickson	1901	7	3	4	0	0.429	—	—	—	—	—	—	—	—	—	0	—
6	Bob Williams	1902–1903	17	14	3	0	0.824	—	—	—	—	—	—	—	—	—	0	—
7	Christie Benet	1904–1905; 1908–1909	32	13	16	3	0.453	—	—	—	—	—	—	—	—	—	0	—
8	Douglas McKay	1907	3	3	0	0	1.000	—	—	—	—	—	—	—	—	—	0	—
9	John Neff	1910–1911	15	5	8	2	0.400	—	—	—	—	—	—	—	—	—	0	—
10	Norman B. Edgerton	1912–1915	35	19	13	3	0.586	—	—	—	—	—	—	—	—	—	0	—
11	W. Rice Warren	1916	9	2	7	0	0.222	—	—	—	—	0	0	0	—	—	0	—
12	Dixon Foster	1917; 1919	17	4	12	1	0.265	—	—	—	—	0	0	0	—	—	0	—
13	Frank Dobson	1918	4	2	1	1	0.625	—	—	—	—	0	0	0	—	—	0	—
14	Sol Metzger	1920–1924	46	26	18	2	0.587	3	8	0	0.273	0	0	0	—	0	0	—
15	Branch Bocock	1925–1926	20	13	7	0	0.650	6	4	0	0.600	0	0	0	—	0	0	—
16	Harry Lightsey	1927	9	4	5	0	0.444	2	4	0	0.333	0	0	0	—	0	0	—
17	Billy Laval	1928–1934	72	39	26	7	0.590	18	18	4	0.500	0	0	0	—	0	0	—
18	Don McCallister	1935–1937	34	13	20	1	0.397	5	11	1	0.324	0	0	0	—	0	0	—
19	Rex Enright	1938–1942; 1946–1955	140	64	69	7	0.482	36	43	3	0.457	0	0	0	—	0	0	—
20	James P. Moran	1943	7	5	2	0	0.714	2	1	0	0.667	0	0	0	—	0	0	—
21	Williams Newton	1944	9	3	4	2	0.444	1	3	0	0.250	0	0	0	—	0	0	—
22	John D. McMillan	1945	9	2	4	3	0.389	0	3	2	0.200	0	1	0	—	0	0	—
23	Warren Giese	1956–1960	50	28	21	1	0.570	19	15	0	0.559	0	0	0	—	0	0	—
24	Marvin Bass	1961–1965	50	17	29	4	0.380	13	18	2	0.424	0	0	0	—	0	0	—
25	Paul Dietzel	1966–1974	96	42	53	1	0.443	18	10	1	0.638	0	1	0	—	1	0	ACC Coach of the Year (1969)
26	Jim Carlen	1975–1981	82	45	36	1	0.555	—	—	—	—	0	3	0	—	—	0	—
27	Richard Bell	1982	11	4	7	0	0.364	—	—	—	—	0	0	0	—	—	0	—
28	Joe Morrison	1983–1988	69	39	28	2	0.580	—	—	—	—	0	3	0	—	—	0	Walter Camp Coach of the Year Award (1984)
29	Sparky Woods	1989–1993	55	25	27	3	0.482	5	11	0	0.313	0	0	0	0	0	0	—
30	Brad Scott	1994–1998	56	23	32	1	0.420	13	26	1	0.338	1	0	0	0	0	0	—
31	Lou Holtz^{†}	1999–2004	70	33	37	—	0.471	19	29	—	0.396	2	0	—	0	0	0	SEC Coach of the Year (2000)
32	Steve Spurrier^{†}	2005–2015	135	86	49	—	0.637	44	40	—	0.524	4	4	—	1	0	0	SEC Coach of the Year (2005, 2010); AP SEC Coach of the Year (2005)
33	Shawn Elliott	2015	6	1	5	—	0.167	1	3	—	0.250	0	0	—	0	0	0	—
34	Will Muschamp	2016–2020	58	28	30	—	0.483	17	22	—	0.436	1	2	—	0	0	0	—
35	Mike Bobo	2020	3	0	3	—	.000	0	3	—	.000	0	0	—	0	0	0	—
36	Shane Beamer	2021–present	72	39	33	—	0.542	19	27	—	0.413	1	2	—	0	0	0	SEC Coach of the Year (2024)
