= South Carolina Gamecocks football under Steve Spurrier =

South Carolina Gamecocks
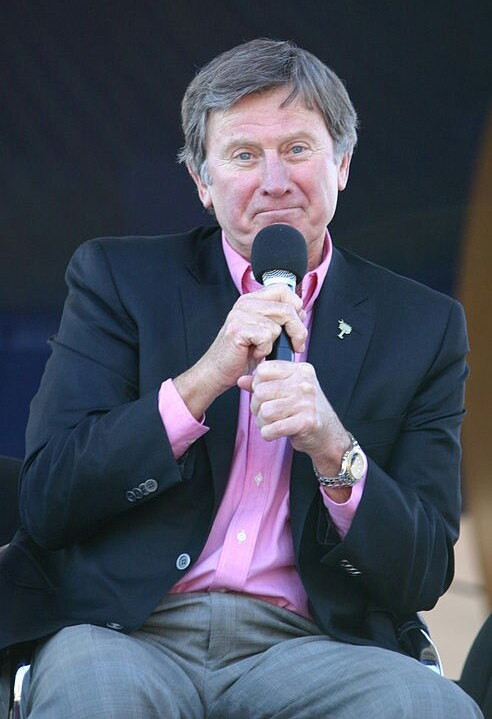
- Spurrier in 2010
- Athletic director: Mike McGee (2004–2005); Eric Hyman (2005–2012); Ray Tanner (2012–2015)
- Head coach: Steve Spurrier; 11th season, 86–49 (.637)
- Stadium: Williams–Brice Stadium
- Conference: Southeastern Conference
- Division: Eastern Division
- Colors: Garnet and black
- Bowl record: 5–4 (.556)

Division championships
- 1
- Consensus All-Americans: 2

Steve Spurrier, former national champion at the University of Florida, served as the head coach of the University of South Carolina Gamecocks football team from November 2004 to October 2015. It was Spurrier's fifth tenure leading a football team, his second longest, and his third and final in college football. He served as South Carolina's 32nd head coach, as well as their second-longest-tenured head coach.

Spurrier oversaw several milestones for the program. The Gamecocks became, for the first time in program history, consistently bowl eligible in the second half of the 2000s. South Carolina reached greater success in the early 2010s: its first ever division title in 2010 and first ever eleven-win seasons in 2011, 2012, and 2013. The Gamecocks regressed the next two years, leading Spurrier to resign in 2015.

Finishing at 86–49, Spurrier has the most wins in program history and the program's highest winning percentage of the modern era. The 2010–2013 seasons marked arguably the best era in program history: South Carolina made its only appearance in the SEC Championship Game, achieved its only eleven-win seasons and top-ten finishes, and became just the twelfth team in college football history to win eleven games in three straight seasons.

Coinciding with a period of heightened in-state high school football talent, Spurrier and his staff were considered skilled recruiters, bringing in players such as Eric Norwood, Melvin Ingram, Stephon Gilmore, Alshon Jeffery, Marcus Lattimore, Connor Shaw, and Jadeveon Clowney. The school's athletic finances and football facilities improved. Spurrier's tenure was a turning point for the program, with long-lasting changes in its traditions, resources, and expectations.

== Background ==
=== Spurrier ===
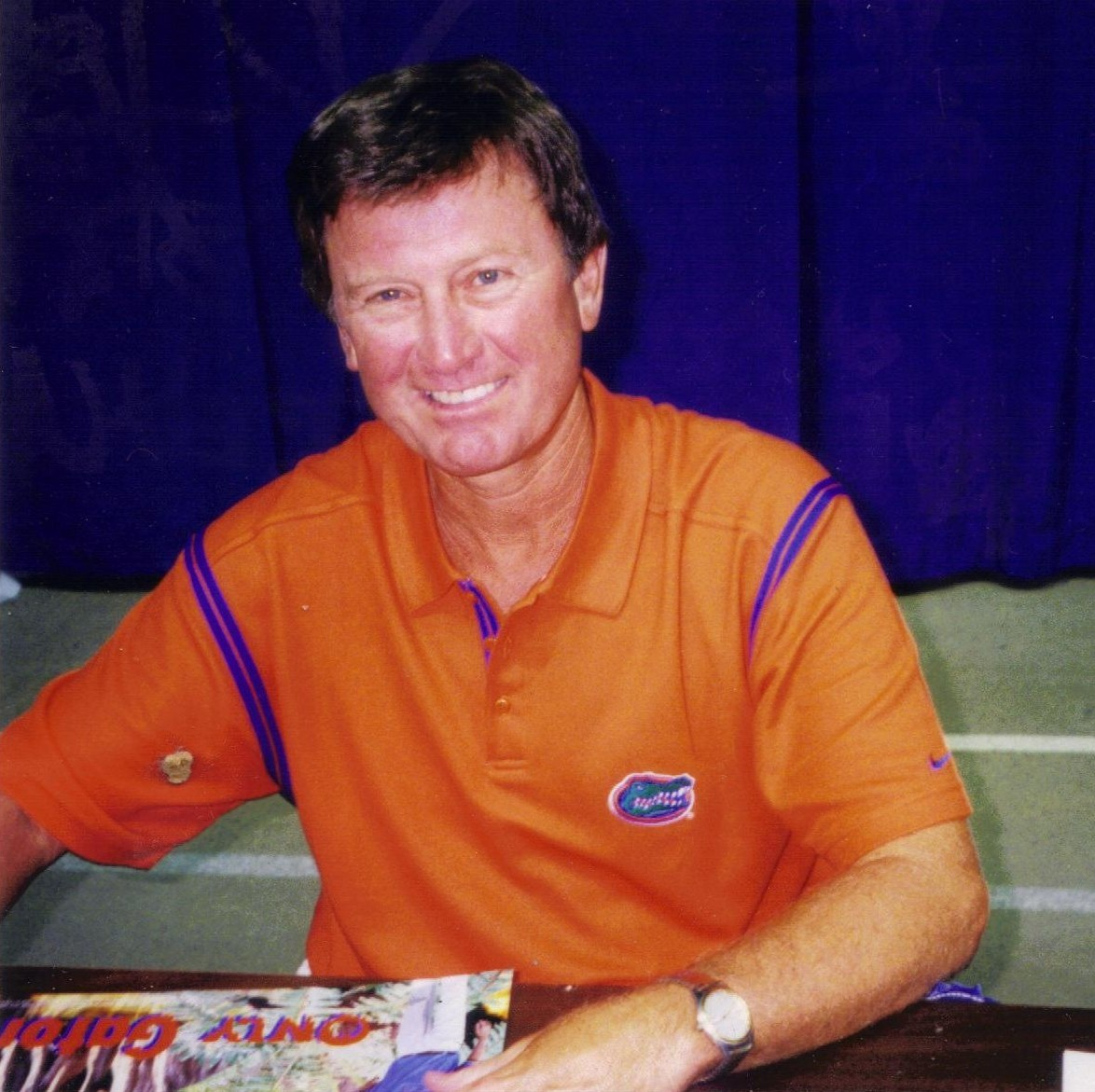
Spurrier in 1999

After winning a Heisman Trophy as a quarterback at the University of Florida and a largely unremarkable NFL playing career, Steve Spurrier entered coaching. He served as an assistant at several schools in the late 1970s and early 1980s, including Florida, Georgia Tech, and Duke. As the offensive coordinator at Duke, Spurrier began to "learn offense", of which his style would be considered revolutionary.

Spurrier earned his first head coaching jobs starting in the 1980s, first with the Tampa Bay Bandits of the United States Football League and then returning to Duke. He led the Blue Devils to their first conference championship in decades and was named the ACC Coach of the Year in 1988 and 1989. On the last day of the decade, Spurrier was hired as the head coach at Florida, returning to his alma mater.

Under head coach Spurrier, the Florida Gators football program of the 1990s and early 2000s was, at the time, considered "arguably the most successful SEC football program ever". From 1990 to 2001, Florida won one national championship and seven conference championships. The Gators finished in the top 10 nine times and finished in the top 5 six times.

In January 2002, Spurrier abruptly resigned from his position at Florida, stating "I simply believe that twelve years as head coach at a major university in the SEC is long enough." Less than two weeks later, he was named the head coach of the Washington Redskins of the NFL. In two seasons, 2002 and 2003, Spurrier went 12–20, and he once again resigned. Spurrier subsequently took a year off in 2004, when he was considered the most attractive free agent on the coaching market.

=== South Carolina ===
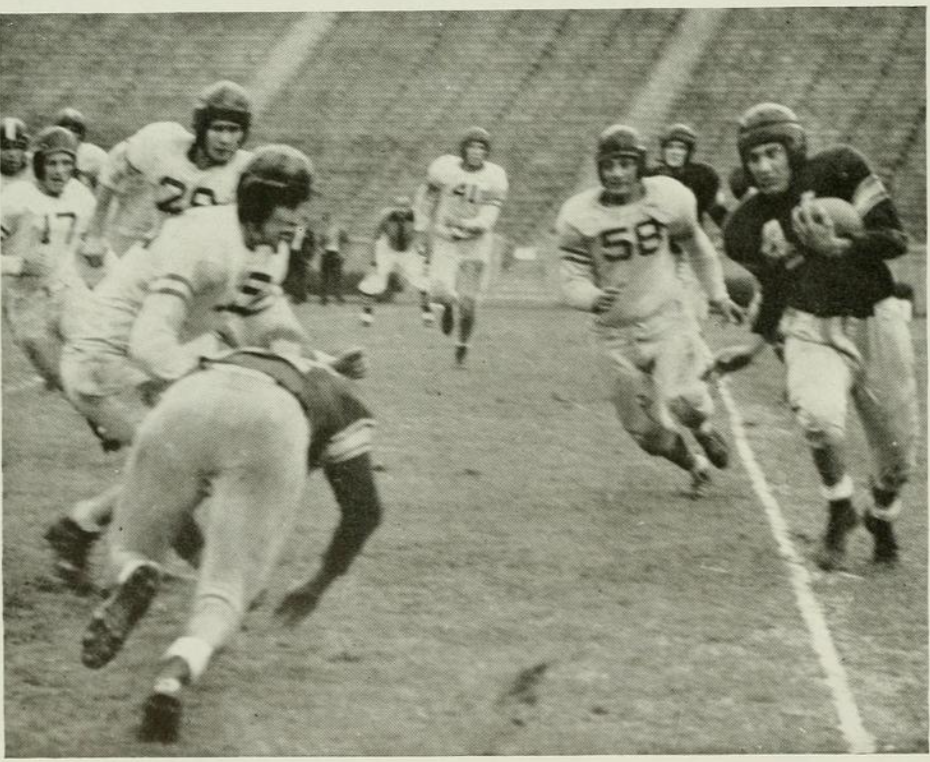
Gamecocks in 1944

In its first 111 years, the University of South Carolina's football program had won one conference championship and three bowl games. The Gamecocks' task of winning championships was considered more difficult than at other schools. The school's football team and other sports teams were considered "inept" and unfortunate, leading many fans to place blame on the so-called "Chicken Curse".

The football program had arguably seen its most success in the late 1970s and 1980s under head coaches Jim Carlen and Joe Morrison, with five eight-win seasons, a Heisman Trophy winner, and the program's only ten-win season. However, a steroids scandal and the death of their head coach at the end of the 1980s sent the Gamecocks on a decade-long downspiral.

Despite its shortcomings, the team was popular. While the Gamecocks had three winning seasons throughout the 1990s, their home, Williams–Brice Stadium in Columbia, was expanded and reached a capacity of more than 80,000 people. On autumn Saturdays, the stadium was the fourth largest city in the state.

Lou Holtz, former assistant coach at South Carolina and national championship-winning head coach at the University of Notre Dame, was hired to turn the team around, becoming the Gamecocks' head coach in December 1998. Holtz and the Gamecocks achieved eight-win seasons in 2000 and 2001, but regressed the next three years. Holtz remained South Carolina's head football coach in 2004, though he had told athletic director Mike McGee in the summer that it might be his last season.

== Overview ==
=== Hiring ===
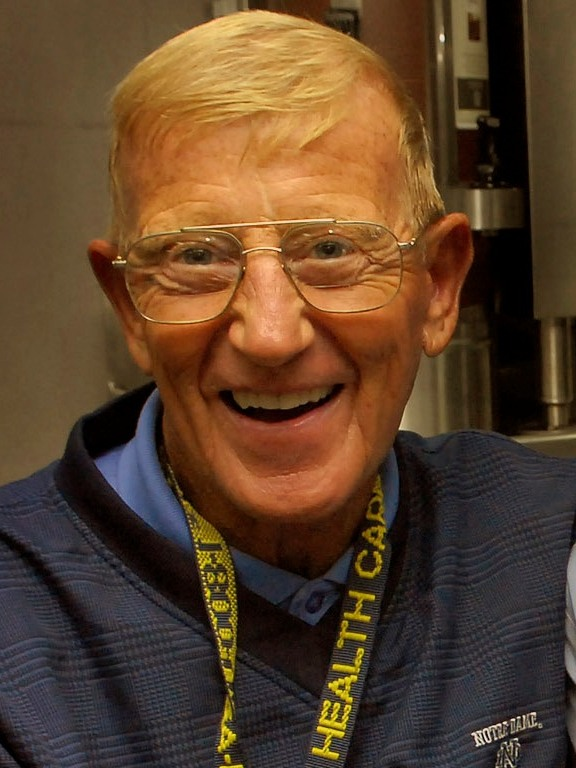
Lou Holtz gave his close friend Spurrier an honest evaluation of the Gamecocks program

On October 25, 2004, Florida head coach Ron Zook was fired. Spurrier was considered a top candidate to return as head coach of the Gators. Publicly, he expressed a moderate amount of interest in the position, and his return to Florida was considered a strong possibility. However, he was not offered the job outright, and it would later be speculated that Spurrier was bothered by having to interview for the job. He also reportedly had several other grievances with Florida, and he would later reiterate that twelve years with one program is enough. Spurrier was also reportedly intrigued by the long-shot possibility of returning to the NFL with the Miami Dolphins, and his name was being mentioned in several other college job possibilities, including North Carolina, Texas, South Carolina, and Washington.

On October 30, after South Carolina's loss to Tennessee, head football coach Lou Holtz told his athletic director, Mike McGee, that it would be his last season. McGee asked Holtz to assist in finding his replacement, to which Holtz agreed. Spurrier was then contacted about the Gamecocks' head coaching job. McGee had a head start because of Holtz's early decision, as well as Spurrier being out of coaching and available to talk immediately. South Carolina president Andrew Sorensen had a connection with Spurrier from Florida, while Holtz and Spurrier were especially close friends. McGee, Holtz, and Augusta National Golf Club president Hootie Johnson were involved in the negotiations. Spurrier's associates said that if Johnson, a former Gamecock football player, were to offer Spurrier a membership at Augusta, Spurrier could be enticed.

Spurrier would later explain why he was immediately very interested in the Gamecocks: "South Carolina has basically everything that I was looking for. It's in the South, it's in the Southeastern Conference, and it's a big state university with wonderful facilities. Their tradition is not that good, so we've got a chance to do some things that have never been done here before. And it was the first job that came open. [...] First of all, the (Florida) job was never offered to me. I didn't feel like going back and doing what we'd already done. [...] I think it worked out best for everybody involved."

"I’d like to borrow a phrase from the Boston Red Sox. Why not us? Why not the University of South Carolina Gamecocks? Why can’t we get to the top of the SEC? And certainly, that’s going to be my vision, my dream. Our ultimate goal is that we can finish atop the SEC, that we can someday win the game in the Georgia Dome. I want to pledge to everyone out there that loves Carolina football, that you’re going to get my best shot."

— Steve Spurrier, his introductory press conference on November 23, 2004

On November 4, Spurrier withdrew his name from consideration for the Gators' head coaching job. By November 13, Spurrier had agreed to come to South Carolina. On November 18, Holtz told his players that he would retire after the season, while Johnson said that Spurrier was not guaranteed a membership at Augusta. On November 20, Holtz and the Gamecocks lost to archrival Clemson, in a game that ended with a massive brawl. Later that day, as a result of the brawl, South Carolina announced it would not accept a post-season bowl bid despite finishing the season bowl-eligible, making the Clemson game the last of Holtz's career. McGee contacted Spurrier about the decision, with Spurrier agreeing. On November 22, Holtz announced his retirement at a press conference at Williams–Brice Stadium. Holtz said he expected to be replaced by a well-known, proven winner with whom he played golf, which appeared to be a reference to Spurrier. On November 23, 2004, at a news conference at Williams–Brice Stadium, Spurrier was introduced as the 32nd head football coach at South Carolina. Spurrier was given a seven-year contract, with an annual guaranteed compensation of $1.25 million.

=== 2005 season ===
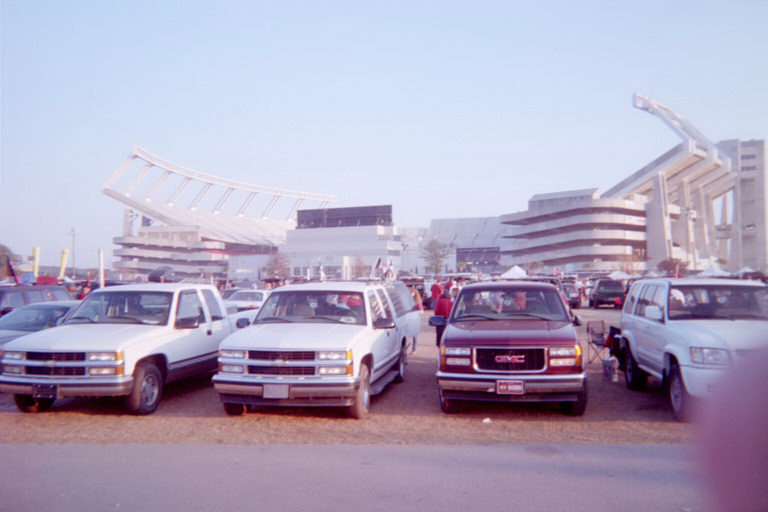
Williams–Brice Stadium several months before Spurrier's redesign

Spurrier inherited a team with many problems. By April, eleven players had been arrested. Other players were injured or dismissed from the team. Six players had their scholarship revoked, a move which many high school coaches in the state called "unethical". Spring practices did not inspire much confidence, and Spurrier admitted that South Carolina was not yet ready to compete for an SEC title. For starting quarterback, he eventually settled on sophomore Blake Mitchell, who had never started a game. The team was young and lacked depth. The football program was placed on probation, due to violations from Holtz' tenure. The athletics department as a whole was in debt, losing money, defeatist, and used to settling for mediocrity.

Fortunately for Spurrier, South Carolina finished up a "strong" 2005 recruiting class, ranked No. 18 by 247Sports, No. 20 by On3.com, and No. 23 by Rivals.com. Notable departures included Troy Williamson, while notable incoming players included Kenny McKinley. Spurrier retained three coaches (Rick Stockstill, Ron Cooper, and David Reaves) and hired others (including his son Steve Spurrier Jr. as receivers coach, and John Thompson and Tyrone Nix as defensive coordinators). (Note: Sources:) Spurrier retained playcalling duties for himself. Athletic director Mike McGee also retired and was replaced by Eric Hyman.

Spurrier, later described as the most famous man in the state, immediately helped provide excitement and exposure to a school that had "long been starving for attention and success in football". The spring game was televised on ESPN2, while the opening game of the season would be televised on ESPN and the site of College GameDay, only the third time the Gamecocks had ever hosted the pre-game show. At Spurrier's request, Williams–Brice Stadium was given a facelift. By July, the university had sold a record number of season tickets, and donations to the Gamecock Club booster organization had skyrocketed from more than $1 million the previous year to a record $13 million.

On September 1, 2005, Spurrier coached and won his first game at South Carolina, a sold-out home game against UCF, who had the country’s longest losing streak. On the road at No. 9 Georgia, several critical mistakes cost the Gamecocks an early upset, losing by only two points in a defensive struggle. It was only Spurrier's second loss to the Bulldogs in their past twelve matchups. Returning home, South Carolina was dominated by Alabama, in Mike Shula's third-ever road win. The Gamecocks broke the losing streak by defeating Troy at home, though Mitchell injured his ankle. On the road at Auburn, under backup quarterback Antonio Heffner, South Carolina was nearly shut out in a forty-point loss. It was the first time in Spurrier's career that he had lost three straight SEC games.

However, the Gamecocks would respond with the longest SEC winning streak in program history. Mitchell returned and led the Gamecocks to their highest scoring home game in a decade, defeating Kentucky. In a home win over Vanderbilt, Syvelle Newton performed well at multiple positions before suffering the team's first serious injury. At No. 23 Tennessee, Josh Brown's "miracle" field goal gave the Gamecocks their first road win against the Volunteers in program history. At struggling Arkansas, South Carolina accomplished their season goal with a sixth win. By this point, redshirt freshman Sidney Rice was leading the SEC in receiving yards per game and had set multiple school records for scoring receptions, while the defense led the SEC in sacks. Next, hosting Spurrier's former team, the Gamecocks upset No. 12 Florida. It was the first win over the Gators since 1939, the highest-ranked win since 2000, and a school-record fifth consecutive SEC win. South Carolina was lifted to No. 19 in the national rankings, their highest since 2001. Before losing at home in their regular season finale against Clemson, the Gamecocks learned that they had not won the SEC East. Following the regular season, Spurrier was named the SEC Coach of the Year for the sixth time in his career. The Gamecocks were selected to play Missouri in the Independence Bowl, their first bowl game since 2001. Prior to the bowl game, there were many staff changes. (Note: Sources:) In the Independence Bowl, despite a 21–0 first quarter lead, the Gamecocks lost to the Tigers. South Carolina ended the season with a 7–5 record.

=== 2006 season ===
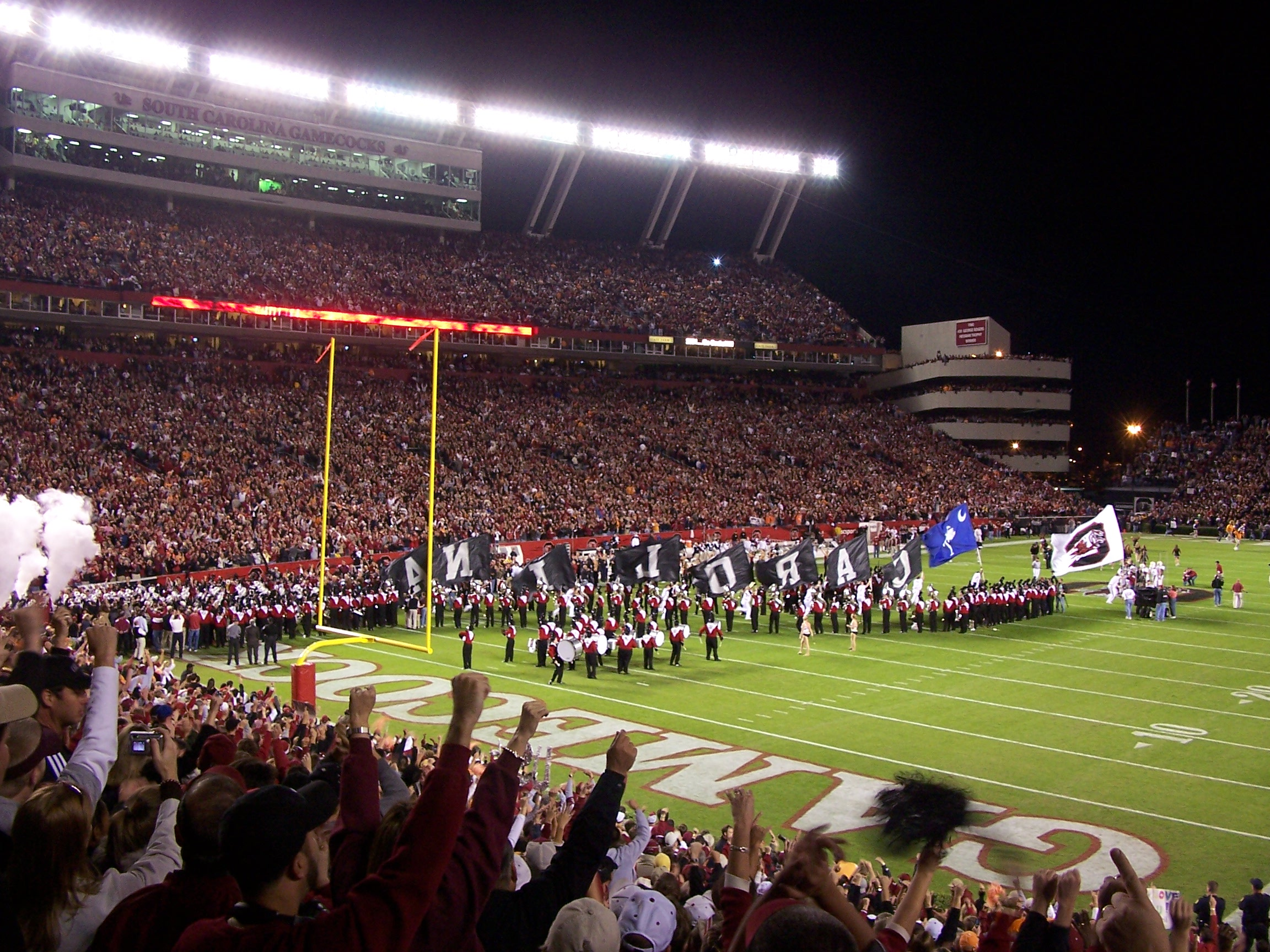
South Carolina in 2006

South Carolina had a 2006 recruiting class that was ranked No. 32 by 247Sports, No. 28 by On3, and No. 24 by Rivals.com. Notable departures included Johnathan Joseph and Ko Simpson, while notable incoming players included Chris Smelley, Eric Norwood, Jasper Brinkley, and Emanuel Cook. The Gamecocks had lost fourteen starters from the prior year, and were now inexperienced on the offensive line and defense. The team's strength was in its offensive skill positions, returning junior quarterback Blake Mitchell, receiver Sidney Rice, and the running back duo of Mike Davis and Cory Boyd. There were also several staff changes, including the departure of co-defensive coordinator John Thompson and the hiring of new defensive line coach Brad Lawing.

South Carolina would begin the season on opposite ends of two shutouts. Despite the returning talent on offense, kicker Ryan Succop scored most of the Gamecocks' points in a road victory over Mississippi State. Next, the Gamecocks were themselves scoreless against No. 12 Georgia in a home loss, the first time Spurrier had been shut out since 1987. Days after the loss, Mitchell was arrested after starting a late-night physical altercation in the Five Points district; he was suspended indefinitely from the team. Under Syvelle Newton's first quarterback start since 2004, South Carolina barely defeated FCS opponent Wofford at home, with the Terriers down only seven points and threatening in Gamecock territory near the end of the game before fumbling. In a home blowout win over Florida Atlantic, Mitchell returned, but Rice's school-record five touchdown receptions were all thrown by Newton. The Gamecocks returned to conference play, welcoming No. 2 Auburn at home, with a chance for the biggest victory in program history. With the Tigers taking every snap of the third quarter, South Carolina lost by a touchdown. The Gamecocks won their next two conference games, defeating Kentucky and Vanderbilt on the road, keeping Spurrier undefeated against those two programs.

Next, after their only two losses this season had come to top-15 teams, South Carolina would face three more consecutive top-15 teams. Hosting No. 8 Tennessee and College GameDay, the Gamecocks were poised for an upset after a comeback and late lead, but the Volunteers ultimately overcame "Spurrier's hex", beating him for only the fifth time ever. Staying at home, South Carolina welcomed No. 12 Arkansas and the SEC's best rushing offense, against whom the Gamecocks once again made a comeback but fell short. Back under Mitchell, South Carolina left home to visit No. 6 Florida, losing by one point after Jarvis Moss blocked two of Succop's kicks. The Gamecocks then beat Middle Tennessee, led by former South Carolina recruiting coordinator Rick Stockstill, in a home victory which ended their losing streak and made them bowl-eligible. Following the win over the Blue Raiders, rumors began that other programs, namely Miami and Alabama, were showing interest in hiring Spurrier. Amid these rumors, Spurrier reaffirmed his desire to stay at South Carolina, who gave him a raise. With their top candidate not interested, Alabama would instead hire Nick Saban. For the regular season finale, despite trailing by fourteen points in the third quarter, South Carolina upset No. 24 Clemson on the road, the program's first victory over their archrival since 2001. The Gamecocks were invited to the Liberty Bowl, with Spurrier becoming the first head coach in program history to take his team to a bowl game in each of his first two seasons. In the bowl game, South Carolina defeated Houston, their first bowl victory since 2001. The Gamecocks finished the season with an 8–5 record, which was only the ninth eight-win season in program history.

=== 2007 season ===
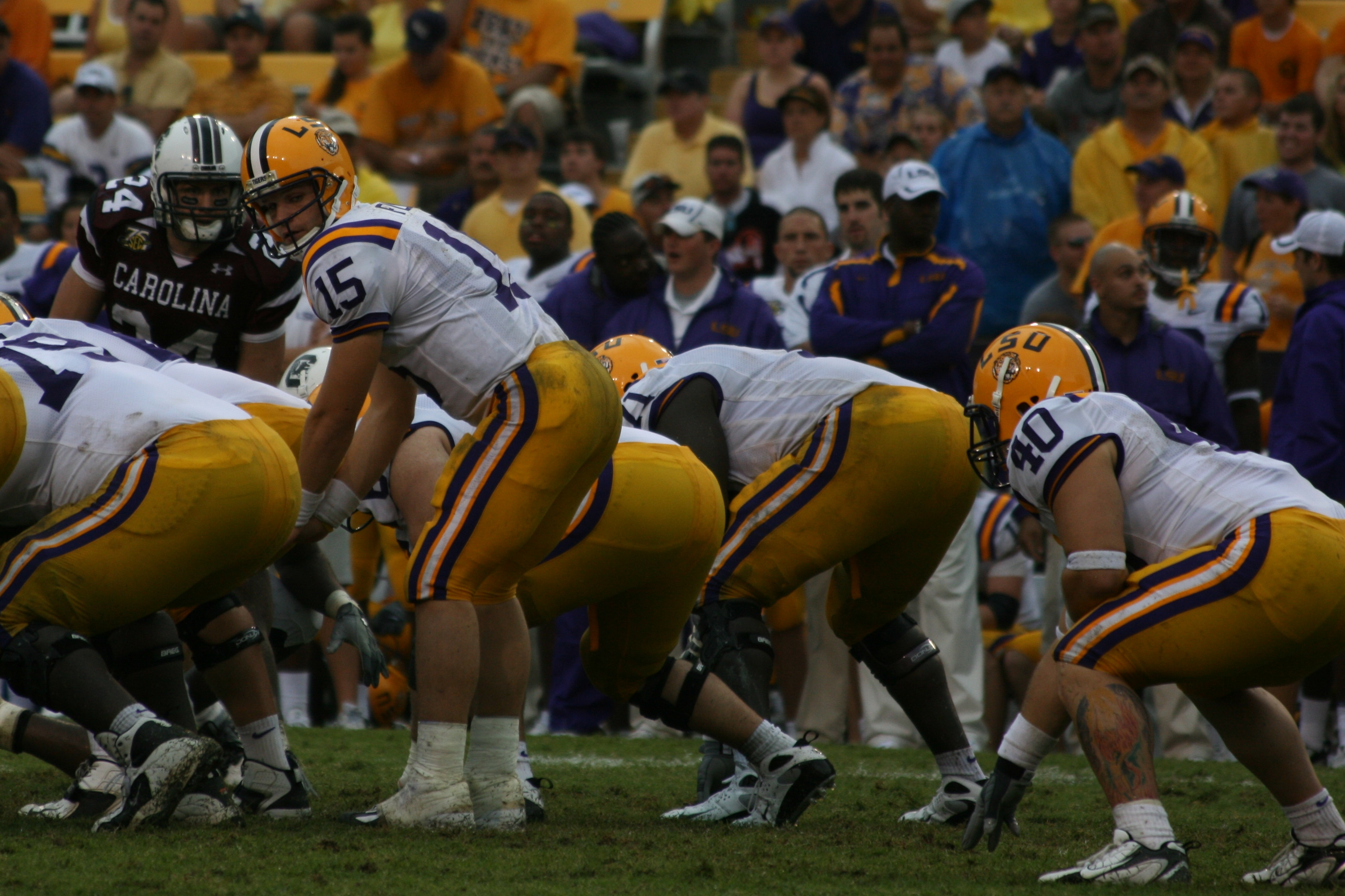
South Carolina lost only to eventual national champion LSU within their first seven games of 2007

South Carolina's 2007 recruiting class was the highest-ranked recruiting class in school history. It was a consensus top-10 class, ranked No. 6 by 247Sports, No. 7 by On3, and No. 6 by Rivals.com. The State would also later report it as being ranked No. 4. Fifteen of the 31 players in the class rated as four-star recruits or higher, equating to roughly a 50% blue-chip ratio. Notable players from the class included Stephen Garcia, Cliff Matthews, and Melvin Ingram. By 2010, the 2007 class will have produced thirteen starters, the most of any of Spurrier's classes at South Carolina until that point. Mississippi State assistant coach Shane Beamer was hired as the new outside linebackers coach and special teams’ co-coordinator. There was quarterback trouble: Garcia was charged by law enforcement twice shortly after his arrival and banned from spring practice, while Blake Mitchell was suspended again. Despite this and the loss of Sidney Rice and Fred Bennett to the NFL, Spurrier predicted that South Carolina was ready to compete for the SEC championship.

Hosting Louisiana-Lafayette, backup quarterbacks Chris Smelley and Tommy Beecher led the Gamecocks to a season-opening victory. At No. 11 Georgia, scoring most of their points with field goals after Mitchell's return, Spurrier's Gamecocks claimed their first victory over the Bulldogs. This upset would be one of the first of many of the nationwide "Year of the Upset". South Carolina entered the national rankings, at No. 17. In a home win over FCS team SC State, the Gamecocks extended a streak of not allowing touchdowns. In a stormy night at No. 2 LSU, the Gamecocks lost the line of scrimmage battle, a chance for the biggest win in program history, and their defense's best player in Jasper Brinkley. Spurrier's decision to name Smelley the new starting quarterback against Mississippi State appeared "genius", as the freshman led South Carolina to a home victory. Hosting No. 8 Kentucky, the Gamecocks secured their second big upset victory, with Norwood scoring two fumble return touchdowns, an NCAA record. It was only the sixth win over a top-ten team in program history. Smelley remained undefeated as a starter as he led the Gamecocks to bowl-eligibility in a road win over North Carolina. By this point, South Carolina was 6–1 and ranked No. 6 in the country (their highest ranking since 1984).

However, South Carolina would "collapse", losing the last five games of the season. Hosting Vanderbilt, "little went right" for the Gamecocks, who became the nation’s latest top-ten team to suffer an upset. It was Spurrier's first loss to the Commodores in his career, and Vanderbilt's highest-ranked win in program history. At Tennessee, the Gamecocks lost a late lead and fell in their second ever overtime. At Arkansas, renewed starter Mitchell could not make up for Razorback rusher Darren McFadden tying an SEC record for rushing yards. Hosting defending national champion No. 17 Florida, South Carolina was trounced by Gator quarterback Tim Tebow, who scored seven touchdowns. At home, the Gamecocks allowed No. 21 Clemson to make their first game-winning field goal in decades. The five-game losing streak was the longest of Spurrier's career. In their last two losses, three of the Gamecocks' punts had been blocked, one of which was returned for a touchdown. The Gamecocks finished last in the SEC in rushing defense. Amidst this losing streak, Spurrier had questioned his players' effort and attitude. South Carolina still finished the regular season bowl-eligible, but was not selected for a bowl game, with the Independence Bowl selecting Alabama and the Music City Bowl selecting Kentucky, instead. As a result, the Gamecocks finished the season with a 6–6 record. It was South Carolina's first non-winning season since 2003, and Spurrier's first non-winning season in college football since 1987.

=== 2008 season ===
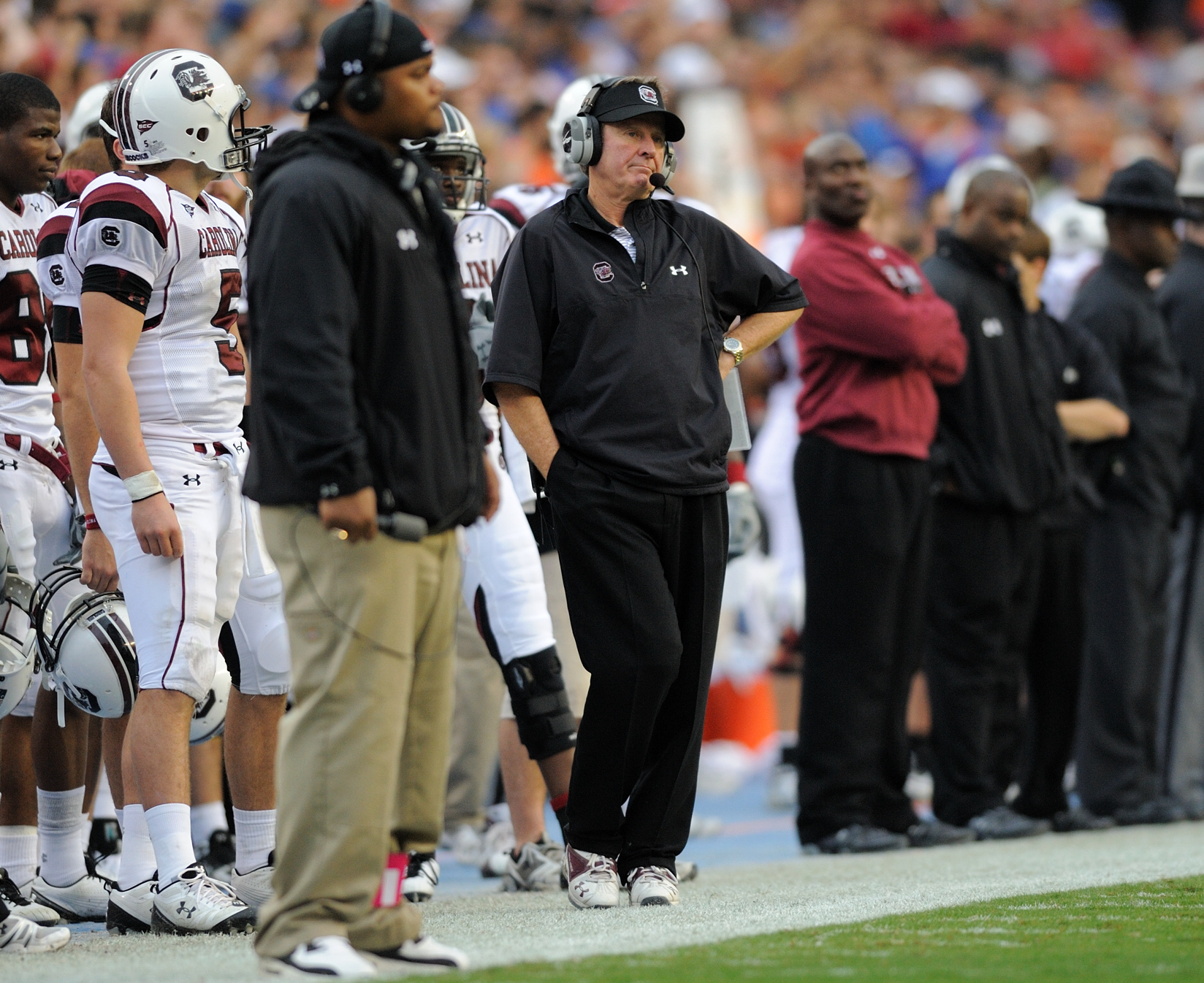
South Carolina sideline in 2008

South Carolina had a 2008 recruiting class that was ranked No. 34 by 247Sports, No. 22 by On3, and No. 22 by Rivals.com. Notable departures included longtime starting quarterback Blake Mitchell, while notable incoming players included Devin Taylor and Antonio Allen. Defensive coordinator Tyrone Nix left to take the same position at Ole Miss; he was replaced by Mississippi State's Ellis Johnson, who inherited a defense returning ten starters from last season. South Carolina announced the "Garnet Way", a new campaign to upgrade facilities. The Gamecocks faced a more difficult schedule than last year, and one writer for ESPN speculated that an aging Spurrier could soon leave if he saw winning a championship as an impossibility.

In the home season-opener which snapped their losing streak, the Gamecocks' defense was "basically winning the game on its own" for most of a shutout victory over NC State. The end of that game earned Smelley the starting quarterback spot, but he led the Gamecocks to a second straight loss to Vanderbilt. Hosting No. 2 Georgia, with another chance for the biggest victory in program history, South Carolina lost a late lead before being intercepted in the final seconds. Hosting FCS opponent Wofford, similarly to the matchup in 2006, the Gamecocks were only up by one score in the final minutes before winning. In a home victory against UAB, freshman Garcia saw the first significant action of his career, kick-starting the offense with his mobility. By this point, South Carolina had the top defense in the country. At Ole Miss, Smelley and the defense snapped the Gamecocks' six-game SEC losing streak. At Kentucky, a matchup between two of the SEC’s top defenses, South Carolina won despite Ryan Succop's four missed field goals and Garcia needing to replace a struggling Smelley in the third quarter. The Gamecocks were now 6–2, on a four-game winning streak.

South Carolina's winning streak ended with a close loss to defending national champion No. 13 LSU, with starter Garcia's collision with the umpire going viral. Despite Garcia leading the Gamecocks to their first home win over Tennessee since 1992, Spurrier did not consider the freshman ready to lead the offense. In a home win over Arkansas, Smelley and Garcia alternated every other snap, both helping Kenny McKinley become the program's all-time leader in career receiving yards. Continuing the quarterback switching and back in the polls, the Gamecocks lost by fifty points at No. 3 Florida, their worst loss since 1995 and Spurrier's worst ever in the Swamp. Smelley led the Gamecocks to Clemson, where a loss cemented the job of Tigers interim head coach Dabo Swinney. South Carolina returned to the postseason with an invitation to the Outback Bowl, with Spurrier tying the school record for bowl game appearances by a coach. It was also the first time South Carolina had been invited to three bowl games in four seasons. Prior to the bowl game, there were several staff changes. (Note: Sources:) In the bowl game, with Garcia starting against Iowa, the Gamecocks had five turnovers, were unable to stop running back Shonn Greene, and lost by three touchdowns. South Carolina finished the season with a 7–6 record.

=== 2009 season ===
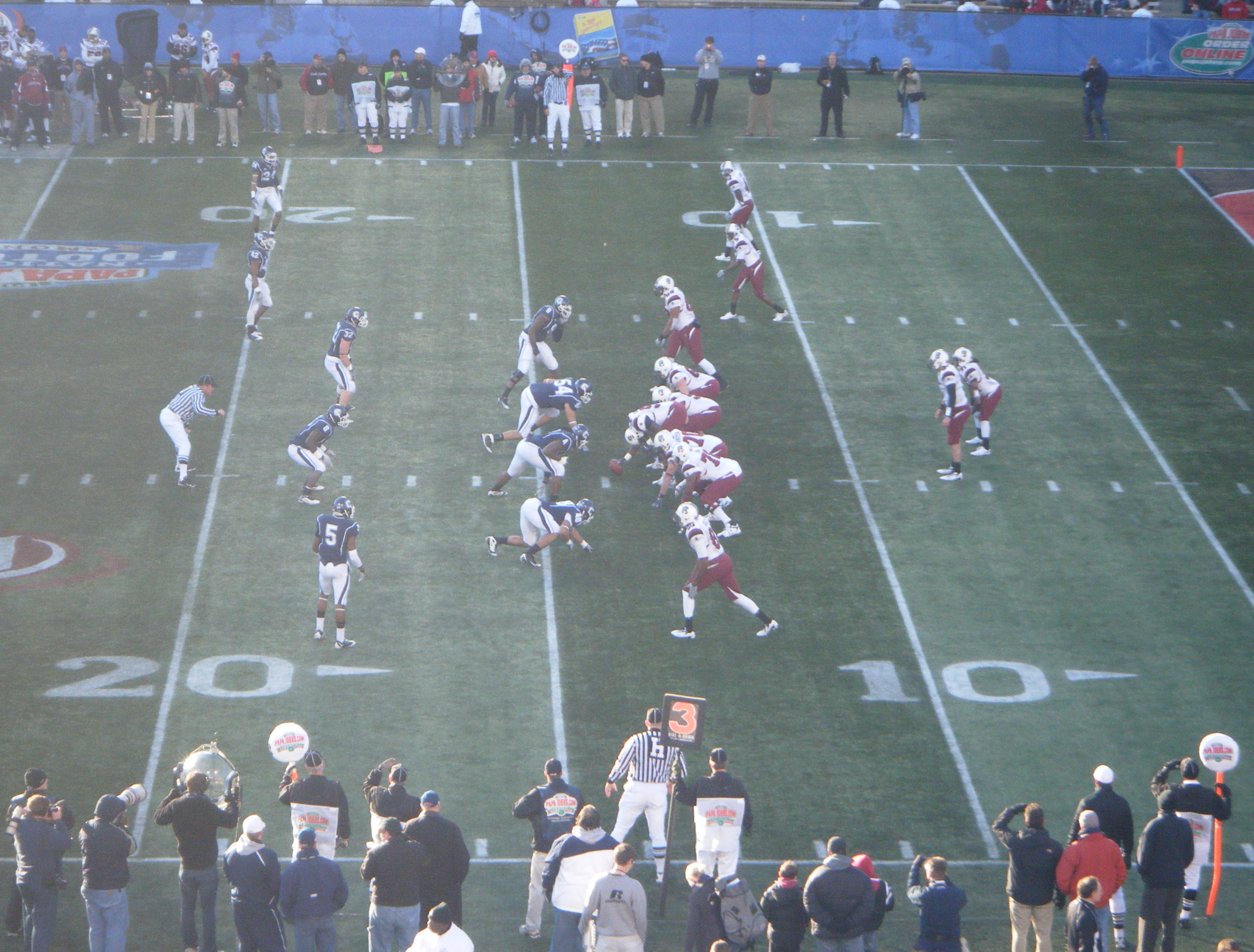
South Carolina endured a second consecutive bowl loss in 2009

After the 2008 season ended with three bad losses, Spurrier "gutted his coaching staff". Arkansas assistant coach Lorenzo Ward was hired as co-defensive coordinator, while Shane Beamer took on new coaching responsibilities, including recruiting. Quality staff changes, as well as a top-15 2009 recruiting class (including Stephon Gilmore, Alshon Jeffery, and D. J. Swearinger) would help "set up the Gamecocks run in the coming years". Gilmore, a cornerback, was South Carolina's first Mr. Football recruit since 2002. However, the Gamecocks also lost seven players to the 2009 NFL draft (including Jared Cook, Kenny McKinley, and Jasper Brinkley), returned very few proven skill players, and faced the most difficult schedule in the country. Garcia, the team's only remaining quarterback with any experience, would start for almost all of the next 2.5 seasons (2009–11).

South Carolina began with a second consecutive season-opening victory over NC State, in which both teams' offenses were inept. In a chaotic, high-scoring game that contrasted with their first win and the series history, the Gamecocks barely lost on the road against No. 21 Georgia. South Carolina bounced back with a home win over Florida Atlantic, which was close in the first half but a blowout in the second. Staying at home, the Gamecocks welcomed No. 4 Ole Miss, with a chance for one of the biggest wins in school history. Scoring most of their points with kicker Spencer Lanning, South Carolina upset the Rebels by six points. The defense received much credit for the biggest win of Spurrier's tenure so far; Eric Norwood recorded his school-record 27th sack. It was only the second win over a top-5 team in school history, the first since 1981, and the first at home in school history. Following the upset over Ole Miss, the song "Sandstorm" would also increasingly become a Gamecock anthem and tradition, as it had been played near the end of the win, to much excitement. Similarly to the game against Florida Atlantic, the Gamecocks pulled away late in a home win against FCS opponent SC State. Hosting Kentucky, with the Wildcats' quarterback leaving due to injury and three touchdown receptions from freshman Alshon Jeffery, South Carolina "outlasted" their opponent and won by two points. By this point, South Carolina was on a four-game winning streak, had a 5–1 record, and was ranked No. 22 in the country.

However, at No. 2 Alabama, the Crimson Tide defense kept Garcia constantly pressured while their running back Mark Ingram had a career performance, snapping the Gamecocks' winning streak. Next, at home, South Carolina defeated Vanderbilt for the first time since 2006. The Gamecocks secured a sixth straight non-losing season for the first time since the 1930s, and defeated a fifth straight SEC opponent at home for the first time ever. In a rainy night at Tennessee, South Carolina struggled to hold on to the ball and committed four turnovers, losing by eighteen points, and falling out of the national rankings. Despite Garcia and Norwood setting themselves apart in the SEC, the Gamecocks lost a road game against Arkansas. For their final conference game, South Carolina returned home to face defending national champion No. 1 Florida, losing by ten points to Tim Tebow and the SEC's best defense. It was the fourth loss in their last five games. In the midst of what appeared to be "another late-season swoon", Spurrier's future was questioned. For the regular season finale, South Carolina hosted No. 15 Clemson at home. Despite Clemson star C. J. Spiller starting the game with an NCAA record-setting seventh career kickoff return touchdown, much went right for the underdog Gamecocks, who secured an upset and their first win in the rivalry since 2006. The Gamecocks were invited to the PapaJohns.com Bowl to face Connecticut, with Spurrier breaking the school record for bowl game appearances by a coach. Prior to the bowl game, running game coordinator and offensive line coach Eric Wolford left to become the head coach at Youngstown State. In the bowl game, South Carolina was nearly shut out by the "motivated" Huskies, with Spurrier and the Gamecocks falling to 1–3 in bowl games. South Carolina finished the season with a 7–6 record.

=== 2010 season ===
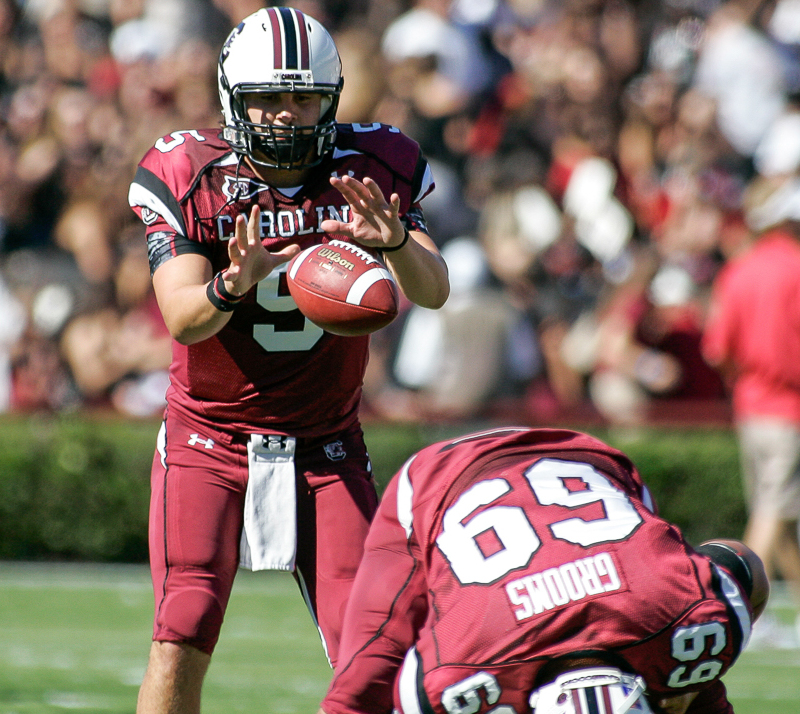
Stephen Garcia's twenty touchdown passes in 2010 were tied for the second most in program history

Opinions on the Gamecocks program were mixed after Spurrier's first five seasons. South Carolina had a 35–28 record, with each of the last two seasons ending in "ugly" bowl game losses. So far, the "lockdown" defense had excelled, while the offense had struggled. For many, expectations had been high and the first five years were a disappointment, including to Spurrier. However, there were reasons for optimism. The university won its fourth team national championship in June, with the baseball program's national success being "contagious" to the rest of the athletics department. The football program was also filling up with talent. Upsets over Ole Miss and Clemson the previous year had "helped start a little something" and provided evidence that the Gamecocks were closer to their goals. Tight end Weslye Saunders would later comment: "We could definitely feel what was about to take place".

South Carolina's 2010 recruiting class was "one of the most talked about in program history", ranked No. 32 by 247Sports, No. 50 by On3, and No. 24 by Rivals.com. Notable departures included Eric Norwood, while notable incoming players included Marcus Lattimore, Connor Shaw, Ace Sanders, A. J. Cann, Victor Hampton, and Dylan Thompson. Lattimore, a running back, was South Carolina's second consecutive Mr. Football recruit. Appalachian State offensive line coach Shawn Elliott was hired as the new offensive line coach. The university would begin handing out white rally towels to fans at home football games. (Note: Seeking to give the stadium an identity, South Carolina had handed out white rally towels in the last three home games of 2008. However, it was not until 2010 that it became a recognized tradition.)

The hyped freshmen led South Carolina to a season-opening home win over Southern Miss. The Gamecocks re-entered the top 25, and would not leave it again until 2014. Staying at home, South Carolina defeated No. 22 Georgia by nine points, with the defense holding Georgia to their fewest points in the rivalry since 1904. Next, the Gamecocks defeated Furman at home. In their first road game, South Carolina blew a double-digit halftime lead and lost to Cam Newton and No. 17 Auburn. Quarterbacks Garcia and Shaw each had two turnovers in the fourth quarter. South Carolina had a bye week before hosting defending national champion No. 1 Alabama, and College GameDay. Garcia had the "best game of his career" and led an upset over the Crimson Tide, the first win over a top-ranked team in school history and the program's "biggest win ever". Spurrier improved to 3–1 against Nick Saban; his third top-ten win at South Carolina was also a school record. However, despite three sacks and career nights from several offensive players, the Gamecocks were upset at Kentucky, the first loss to the Wildcats in Spurrier's career. Tailback Brian Maddox carried South Carolina to a difficult bounceback win at Vanderbilt, their first SEC road win since 2008. The Gamecocks then returned home to defeat Tennessee. Alshon Jeffery, by now having two or three players covering him every play, broke the game's late tie. Hosting No. 17 Arkansas, the Gamecocks were torched by the Razorbacks in passing and rushing, enduring their worst home loss since 2005.

Despite the 3–3 start in SEC play, South Carolina's place in the conference standings ensured that if they were to win their next game, a road game at Florida, they would clinch the SEC Eastern Division. Behind the efforts of Garcia and Lattimore, the Gamecocks won in the Swamp and won the SEC East, both for the first time in program history. Next, in the highest-scoring game under Spurrier until then, South Carolina defeated Troy in their final home game. Lattimore and Jeffery, the first 1,000-yard rushing/receiving duo in school history, each broke single-season school records, for scoring and receiving yards, respectively. For the regular season finale, the Gamecocks traveled to Clemson, defeating them in consecutive seasons for the first time since 1970. The Gamecocks traveled to Atlanta for their first ever SEC Championship Game for a rematch against No. 1 Auburn. Newton's passing overpowered the Gamecocks, who lost by more than five touchdowns. Regardless, Spurrier was named the SEC Coach of the Year for the first time since 2005. Lattimore was named the SEC and National Freshman of the Year, while Jeffery was named a finalist for the Biletnikoff Award. South Carolina was invited to the Chick-fil-A Bowl, facing No. 23 Florida State. The Gamecocks committed five turnovers and lost to the Seminoles, with Spurrier falling to 1–4 in bowl games at South Carolina. Despite Garcia's three interceptions in that game, he finished the year with a second consecutive top-five statistical quarterback season in school history. Spurrier's offense was now on par with his defense; the Gamecocks scored ten more points per game in 2010 than they did in the last two years. The Gamecocks ended the season with a 9–5 record and ranked No. 22 in the country. It was the first time South Carolina had finished ranked since 2001, and the nine-win season was only the third in program history.

=== 2011 season ===
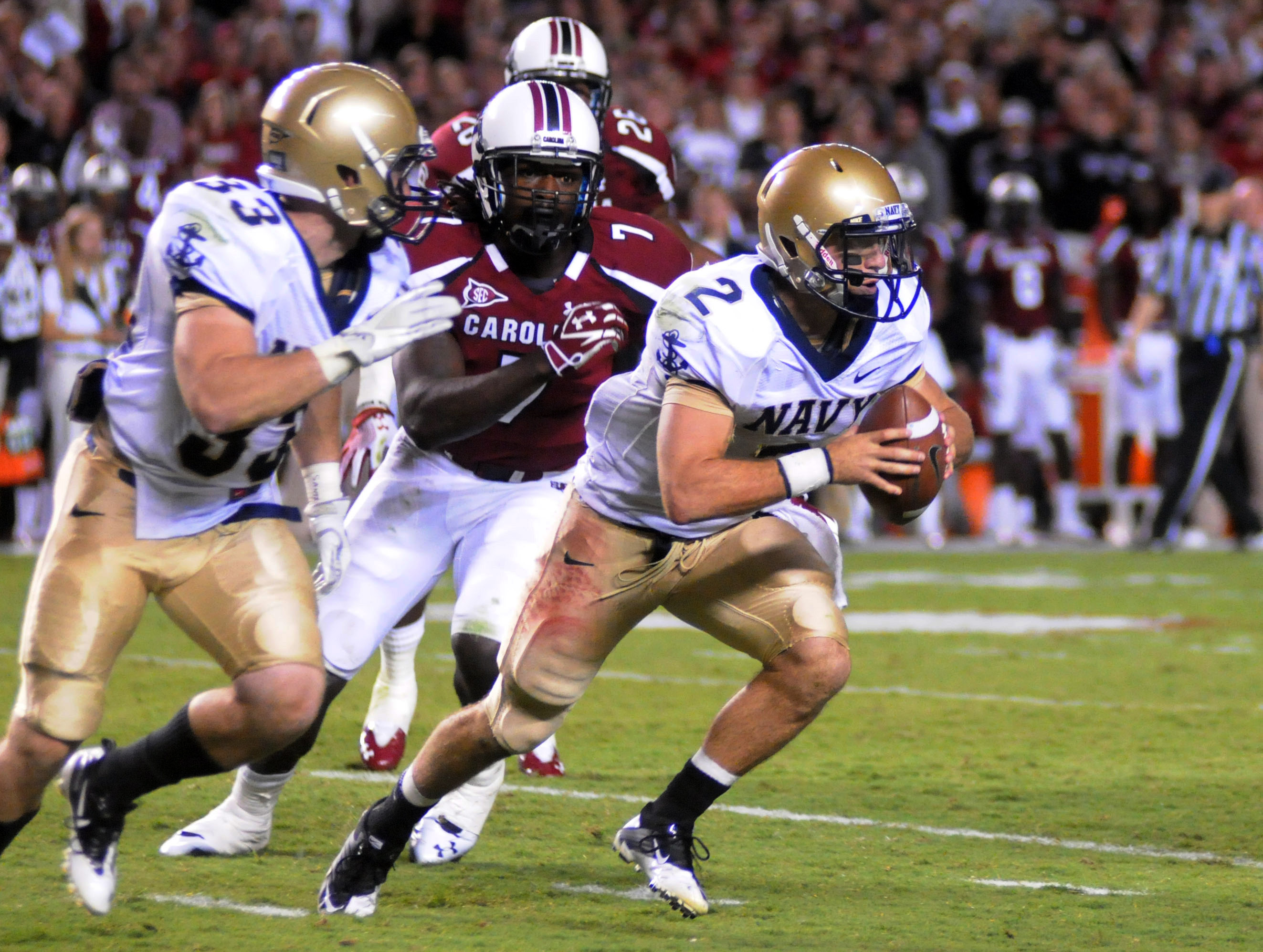
South Carolina's 2011 defense allowed the third-fewest yards per game in the nation

South Carolina had a 2011 recruiting class that was ranked No. 17 by 247Sports, No. 16 by On3, and No. 18 by Rivals.com. Notable departures included Chris Culliver and Cliff Matthews, while notable incoming players included Jadeveon Clowney, Brandon Shell, Damiere Byrd, and Kelcy Quarles. Clowney, a defensive end, was the top-ranked recruit in the entire country. He was South Carolina's third consecutive Mr. Football recruit, and the second in three years from the same high school. Assistant coach Shane Beamer also left to join his father at Virginia Tech. Receivers coach and passing game coordinator Steve Spurrier Jr. replaced Beamer as recruiting coordinator.

South Carolina was considered a potential dark horse contender entering the 2011 season, with the return of fifth-year quarterback Stephen Garcia, Heisman Trophy candidate Marcus Lattimore, two starting receivers, and a solid offensive line, as well as Alabama not being on the schedule. Despite the hype around Garcia, Connor Shaw was named the starter after preseason camp, ending the former's 28-game starting streak. The Gamecocks started with the fourteenth best preseason odds to win the national championship. For the first time since joining the SEC, the Gamecocks were the preseason favorite to win the Eastern Division. Subsequently, South Carolina started the season ranked No. 12, the highest preseason ranking in program history until then. The university would also now begin playing a new pregame video before the team's entrance: "Welcome to Williams–Brice".

The Gamecocks' season had a rough start, with the team initially down seventeen points against East Carolina at a neutral site. Garcia subsequently replaced Shaw at quarterback, shifting the game's momentum and sparking a comeback, which turned into a blowout victory. Afterwards, Shaw conceded that it was Garcia's team. Next, South Carolina started conference play, defeating Georgia by three points in a high-scoring "thriller" on the road. The Gamecocks returned home to face Navy, and won after trailing late. South Carolina then contained Vanderbilt defensively, winning at home by eighteen points. Staying at home, the Gamecocks welcomed defending national champion Auburn, now without Cam Newton. Despite another "stellar" defensive performance, South Carolina lost by three points, their third loss to the Tigers in two seasons. With Garcia having nine interceptions in five games, Shaw was reannounced as the starter. Garcia would soon be dismissed for failing to comply with guidelines, and Shaw would subsequently be the starting quarterback for much of South Carolina's next 2.5 seasons (2011–13).

South Carolina bounced back with a blowout win over Kentucky at home, which would be the start of an eighteen-game home winning streak. Shaw showed promise as the renewed starter, leading the Gamecocks to their most total yards of offense in a game since 2001. However, at Mississippi State, Shaw mostly struggled and the Gamecocks survived with a late Jeffery touchdown and Swearinger interception. Lattimore, Heisman Trophy-frontrunner who was leading the SEC in rushing yards per game, also suffered a season-ending injury. After a bye week, the Gamecocks won at Tennessee for only the second time ever, setting a school record for consecutive true road game victories. This road winning streak would not continue, as South Carolina traveled to No. 8 Arkansas and lost by sixteen points. Back at home, South Carolina had a close victory over Florida, a school-record sixth SEC win. The Gamecocks then had their "best offensive game" under Spurrier against FCS opponent The Citadel before learning that Georgia had clinched the SEC East, with South Carolina finishing second. The Gamecocks ended the regular season by defeating No. 17 Clemson by three touchdowns at home. South Carolina was invited to the Capital One Bowl to face No. 21 Nebraska. Prior to the bowl game, there were staff changes. (Note: Sources:) The university also announced several self-imposed penalties on the football program due to multiple violations. Melvin Ingram was named the program's third ever consensus All-American, while Clowney was named the SEC Freshman of the Year; both contributed to a defense which would finish having allowed the third-fewest yards per game in the country. South Carolina defeated the Cornhuskers, claiming their first bowl victory since 2006. The Gamecocks finished the season with an 11–2 record and ranked No. 8 and No. 9 in the polls. The eleven wins were the most in program history, and the top-ten finish was also the first ever.

=== 2012 season ===
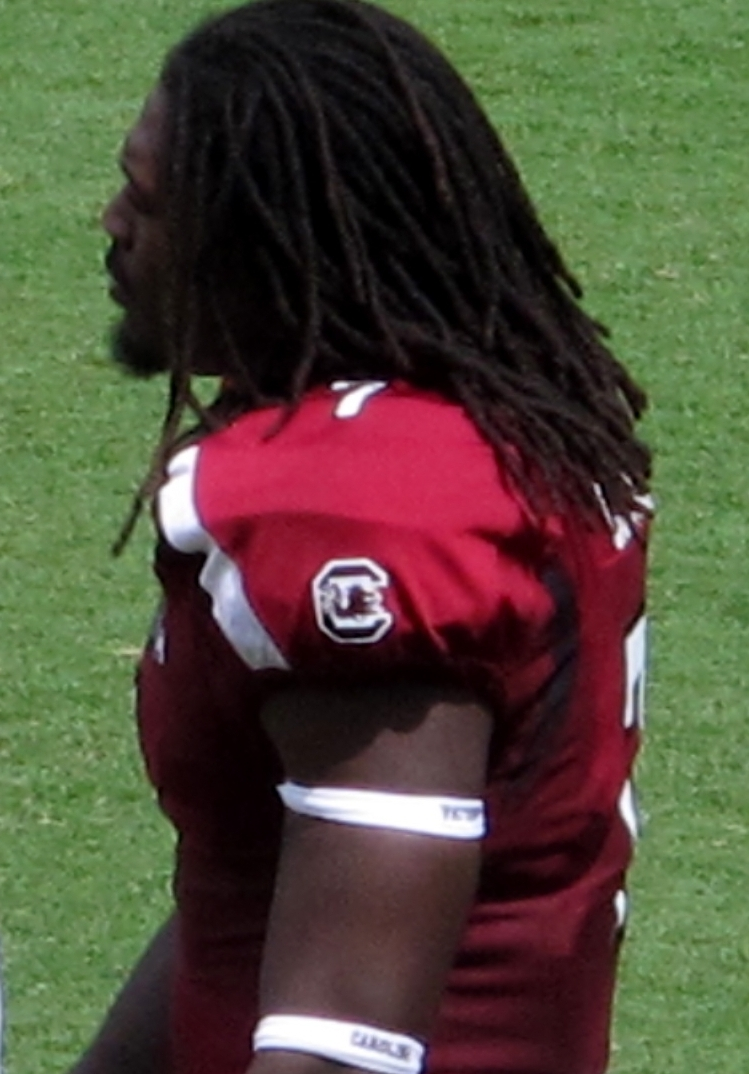
Sophomore Jadeveon Clowney emerged as college football's top defensive prospect in 2012

South Carolina had a 2012 recruiting class that was ranked No. 16 by 247Sports, No. 19 by On3, and No. 19 by Rivals.com. The Gamecocks lost six players to the 2012 NFL draft. Notable departures included Stephon Gilmore, Melvin Ingram, and Alshon Jeffery, while notable incoming players included Mike Davis (Note: Not to be confused with the Gamecock running back who played under Spurrier from 2005 to 2008, also named Mike Davis.) and Shaq Roland. Roland, a wide receiver, was South Carolina's fourth consecutive Mr. Football recruit. Offensive line coach Shawn Elliott and receivers coach Steve Spurrier Jr. were both promoted to co-offensive coordinator. Athletic director Eric Hyman left to take the same position at Texas A&M; he was replaced by Ray Tanner. Hyman left an athletic department with much-improved finances and football facilities. South Carolina started ranked No. 9, the highest preseason ranking in program history until then, and tied for the twelfth best preseason odds to win the national championship.

The Gamecocks started the season with a "big scare" against Vanderbilt, barely defeating the Commodores on the road by four points. Before defeating East Carolina in their first home game, South Carolina started a new tradition of having its players walk through the crowd to the stadium and turned on the SEC's new third-largest video board. The Gamecocks next defeated UAB at home, with Lattimore breaking the school record for career touchdowns. Shaw led South Carolina to its first ever win against new conference rival Missouri with twenty straight completions, the second most in SEC history at the time. Trailing Kentucky at halftime on the road, the Gamecocks "rallied" for a convincing second half comeback victory. Hosting No. 6 Georgia, College GameDay, and a record crowd at Williams–Brice Stadium, the Gamecocks again won convincingly. It was the first win in a meeting of top-ten teams in program history, and the third consecutive win over Georgia was also a school record. By this point, South Carolina was on a school-record ten-game winning streak, had mostly dominated this season, and were ranked No. 3 in the country, the second highest ranking in program history.

However, against two more highly ranked teams, on the road, South Carolina's offense would "disappear". At No. 9 LSU, the Gamecocks "realized why the Tigers were preseason No. 1", losing their winning streak. At No. 3 Florida, with Lattimore mostly sidelined, South Carolina struggled with turnovers and suffered a blowout defeat. A fully returned Lattimore helped South Carolina end their losing streak with a close home victory over Tennessee, though he sustained a "gruesome" season-ending knee injury. Despite D. J. Swearinger by now drawing penalties due to his "reputation", his pick-six sealed the Gamecocks' first win against Arkansas since 2008. Although now out of the SEC race, the Gamecocks had a third consecutive eight-win season for the first time in school history. At home, South Carolina pulled away late from FCS opponent Wofford, though Shaw sprained his ankle. The Gamecocks finished with a perfect home record and next had a top-15 matchup with Clemson (both for the first time since 1987). Backup quarterback Dylan Thompson and Clowney led a victory over the Tigers, making their head coach the winningest in program history. Clowney had 4.5 sacks and set the school's single-season record with thirteen sacks; leading one of the nation's best defenses, he would finish the season with a plethora of honors, including unanimous all-American, All-America Player of the Year, Hendricks Award, SEC Defensive Player of the Year, and sixth in Heisman Trophy voting. The Gamecocks were invited to the Outback Bowl to end the season, facing No. 19 Michigan. In the bowl game, South Carolina played both quarterbacks, Clowney made a tackle which shifted the game's momentum and propelled him to instant fame, and the Gamecocks defeated the Wolverines with a last-minute touchdown. Spurrier's third bowl victory with the Gamecocks was a school record. South Carolina finished the season with an 11–2 record and ranked No. 7 and No. 8 in the polls, the highest final rankings in program history until then.

=== 2013 season ===
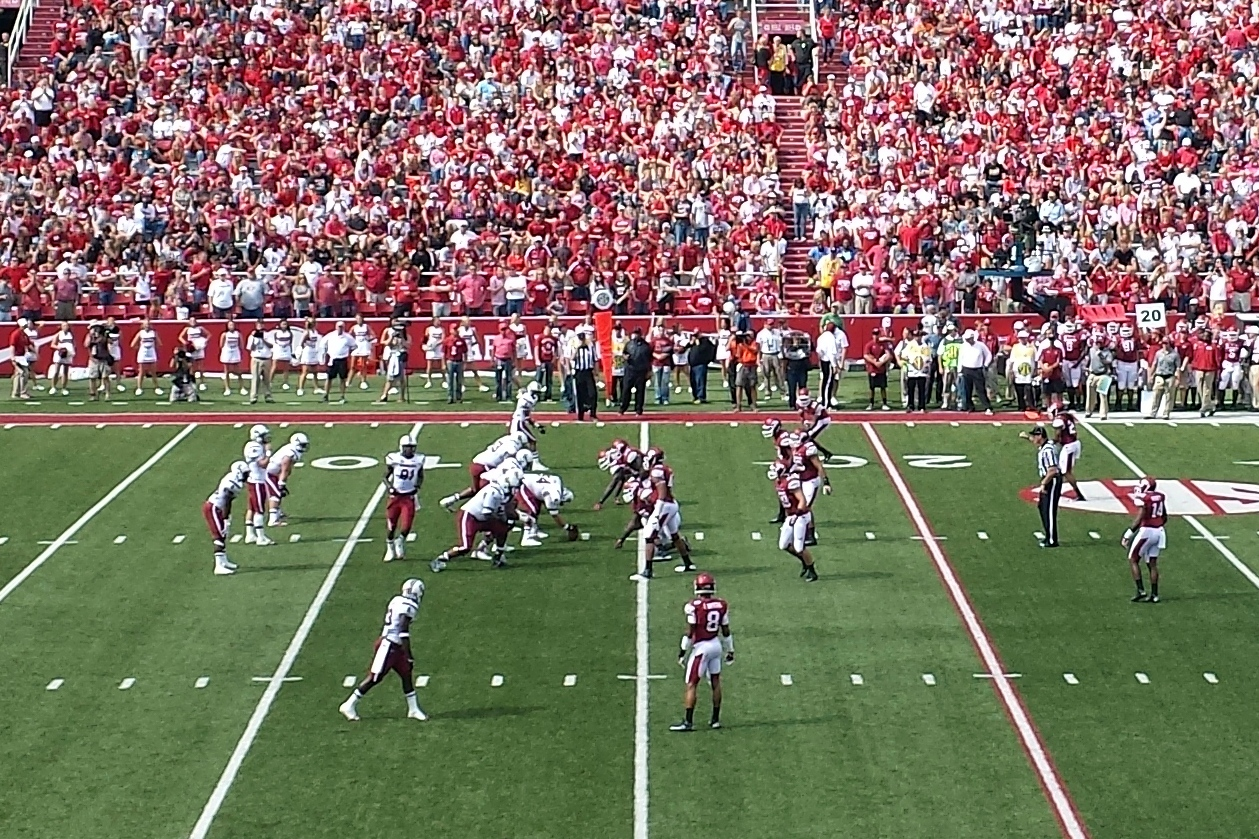
South Carolina's margin of victory over Arkansas in 2013 was their largest on the road under Spurrier

South Carolina had a 2013 recruiting class that was ranked No. 20 by 247Sports, No. 19 by On3, and No. 16 by Rivals.com. The Gamecocks lost seven players to the 2013 NFL draft. Notable departures included D. J. Swearinger, Ace Sanders, and Marcus Lattimore, while notable incoming players included Pharoh Cooper, Skai Moore, and Connor Mitch. Defensive line coach Brad Lawing left to take the same position at Florida; he was replaced by Deke Adams from North Carolina. Following Jadeveon Clowney's viral tackle in the Outback Bowl, it was speculated he could become the first defense-only player to win the Heisman Trophy, though Spurrier repeatedly stated throughout the summer that South Carolina was more than just Clowney. South Carolina started ranked No. 6 in the country, the highest preseason ranking in program history, and tied for the twelfth best preseason odds to win the national championship.

The Gamecocks comfortably won the 2013 season-opener against North Carolina at home, despite concerns about the defense's conditioning. Next, the Gamecocks went on the road and lost by eleven points to No. 11 Georgia, the first loss to the Bulldogs and earliest loss in a season since 2009. The loss was blamed on the defense, who were unable to stop Bulldogs senior quarterback Aaron Murray having one of the best performances of his career in his first ever top-ten win. South Carolina "hoped to make a loud statement" against Vanderbilt at home, but nearly gave up a four-touchdown lead in the second half. After a bye week, on the road at UCF, the Gamecocks overcame injuries, turnovers, and a ten-point halftime deficit to win by three points. Back at home, hosting Kentucky, South Carolina lost a large lead for the third straight game, but still won by a touchdown. Although an absent Clowney was having a middling season, running back Mike Davis was now the SEC's leading rusher. At Arkansas, the Gamecocks handily claimed their first road victory against the Razorbacks since 2005. South Carolina then traveled to Tennessee, where they suffered an upset. At the end of a tightly contested game, the Volunteers made a "spectacular" catch, before kicking a game-winning field goal. It was the Gamecocks' first loss to an unranked team since 2011, and the 5–2 start and new No. 20 ranking were both the worst since 2010. Connor Shaw also suffered a sprained knee in the loss.

Next week, on the road at No. 5 Missouri, South Carolina started the game down seventeen points, and were given less than a 3% chance to win. An injured Shaw then replaced Dylan Thompson at quarterback, and the Gamecocks made a comeback in the fourth quarter to send the game to overtime. South Carolina subsequently won in double overtime. The "Miracle at Mizzou" was the largest comeback since 2011, the first road win against a top-five team since 1981, and the first overtime victory in school history. It also kept South Carolina alive in the SEC East race. Returning home for the rest of the regular season, the Gamecocks defeated Mississippi State. After a season of inconsistency, the defense "looked like its dominating, old self", with five turnovers, while Davis became the program's first 1,000-yard rusher since 2010. The Gamecocks then won a school-record sixteenth straight home win against Florida. In addition to winning their last conference game, the Gamecocks' conference title hopes were further bolstered by the Prayer at Jordan–Hare, which was played live on the video board at Williams–Brice Stadium. Next, South Carolina defeated FCS opponent Coastal Carolina at home by sixty points in the highest-scoring game of Spurrier's tenure. With the victory, Shaw became the winningest starting quarterback in school history. The Gamecocks closed out the regular season by hosting No. 6 Clemson. South Carolina forced six turnovers and defeated the Tigers by two touchdowns, a school-record fifth consecutive victory in the rivalry. Shaw finished his career 17–0 at Williams–Brice Stadium; Spurrier anointed him the best quarterback in school history. However, less than an hour after the win, the team learned that Missouri had clinched the SEC East, with the Gamecocks finishing second in the division instead. South Carolina was invited to the Capital One Bowl, their second in three years, to face No. 19 Wisconsin. The Gamecocks defeated the Badgers by ten points. It was the first time South Carolina had ever won bowl games in three consecutive years; (Note: The first time South Carolina won three consecutive bowl games in nonconsecutive years was 1994–2001. However, the first time South Carolina won three consecutive bowl games in three consecutive years was 2011–2013.) Spurrier's four bowl victories with the Gamecocks were more than all of the school's bowl victories before his tenure, combined. Shaw scored all five of his team's touchdowns in his final college game, while the 2013 offense finished as "the program's best, statistically". South Carolina finished the season with an 11–2 record and ranked No. 4 in the country. It was the Gamecocks' first top-five finish ever, and it would remain the highest final ranking in school history.

=== 2014 season ===
South Carolina's victory in the 2014 Independence Bowl was described by ESPN as "a satisfying ending to a frustrating season"

The Gamecocks had won 42 games in the last four years; the best four-year stretch in program history until then had been 28 wins. South Carolina was one of three programs, alongside Alabama and Oregon, to finish in the top-ten in each of the last three seasons. South Carolina had a 2014 recruiting class that was ranked No. 19 by 247Sports, No. 14 by On3, and No. 16 by Rivals.com. Notable departures included Connor Shaw, Jadeveon Clowney, and Bruce Ellington, while notable incoming players included Deebo Samuel. Entering his tenth season, Spurrier became the school's second-longest tenured head football coach. Fifth-year senior Dylan Thompson, who had a 3–0 record as a starter, was named the new starting quarterback. The Gamecocks were picked in the preseason to win the SEC East for the first time since 2010. Several key players returned on offense, while the defense was not expected to diminish significantly despite the loss of Clowney. The program now expected to win ten or more games annually. South Carolina began ranked No. 9 in the country and tied for the eleventh best odds to win the first-ever College Football Playoff national championship.

However, for the season opener, the Gamecocks were "embarrassed" at home by No. 21 Texas A&M in a blowout, snapping their nation-leading eighteen-game home winning streak. The Aggies' 680 total yards of offense were the most allowed in school history. South Carolina bounced back with a ten-point home victory over East Carolina. Hosting No. 6 Georgia, the Gamecocks won a tightly contested game by three points. This upset put the Gamecocks back in the SEC East race. South Carolina traveled to Vanderbilt and initially fell behind fourteen points before rallying to win in the final minutes. Spurrier, who passed Vince Dooley for the second most SEC wins ever, concluded that his team was not good. Next, the Gamecocks hosted Missouri and College GameDay at home. South Carolina initially played well defensively and gave themselves a thirteen-point lead with eight minutes left, but ultimately lost. Afterwards, South Carolina dropped out of the top 25 for the first time since 2010. The next contest was on the road at Kentucky. For the second consecutive week, South Carolina held a two-touchdown lead in the fourth quarter and lost, their first loss to the Wildcats since 2010. By this point, the Gamecocks were 3–3 (their worst start since 2005), had the worst defense in the SEC, and were all but removed from the SEC East race.

The losing streak was stopped with a bye week and a comfortable home victory over FCS opponent Furman. South Carolina then traveled to No. 5 Auburn. Despite being eighteen-point underdogs, the Gamecocks played a "close game" and only lost by a touchdown. South Carolina returned home to face Tennessee. For the third time that season, the Gamecocks blew a two-touchdown fourth quarter lead, and lost in overtime, their second straight loss to the Volunteers. After the game, Spurrier spent less than a minute in front of reporters and did not take questions before walking out. Despite the team's struggles, sophomore receiver Pharoh Cooper had emerged as their best offensive player, breaking the program's single-game receiving record. South Carolina finished conference play by traveling to Florida, where the Gamecocks blocked two kicks and won in overtime, the second overtime victory in school history. Following the win over the Gators, Florida head coach Will Muschamp was fired. South Carolina then defeated South Alabama by more than twenty points at home, becoming bowl-eligible with their sixth win of the season. The Gamecocks traveled to No. 21 Clemson for the regular season finale. With the Tigers' offensive freshmen playing well, including quarterback Deshaun Watson who was playing on a torn ACL, South Carolina suffered their first loss in the rivalry since 2008 and Spurrier fell to 6–4 in the series. Thompson also set a new school record for single-season passing yards in the loss. The Gamecocks were invited to the Independence Bowl to face Miami. Spurrier's nine bowl game appearances at South Carolina were two fewer than all of the school's bowl appearances before his tenure, combined. Prior to the bowl game, Spurrier announced he would remain the Gamecocks' coach for two or three more years; at least four players in the 2015 signing class de-committed. Behind the efforts of Thompson and Cooper, South Carolina defeated the Hurricanes by three points, a school-record fourth consecutive bowl victory and Spurrier's fifth at South Carolina. The Gamecocks finished with a 7–6 record.

=== 2015 season ===
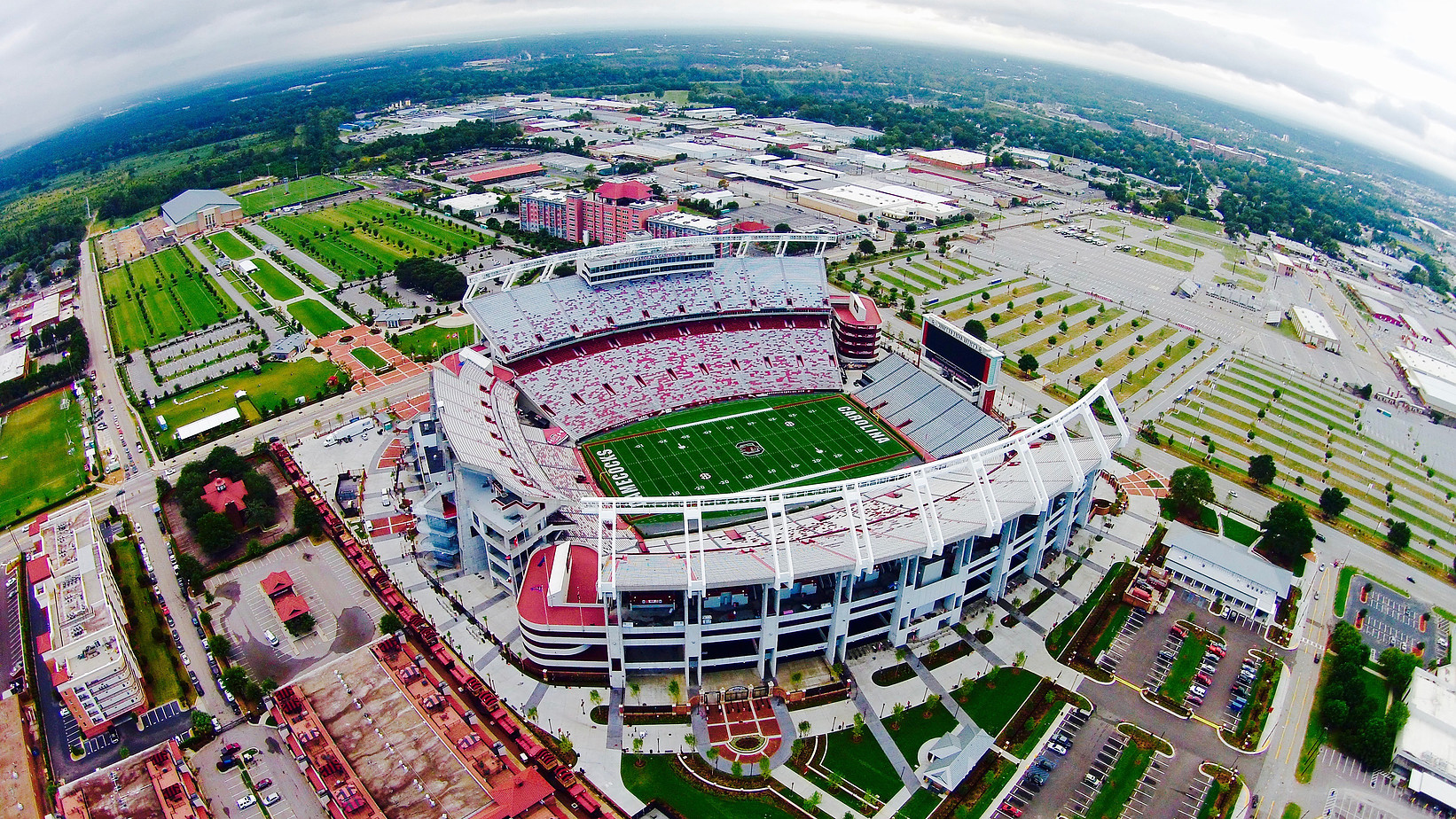
Spurrier only coached two games at Williams–Brice Stadium in 2015

Spurrier was ready to retire after the 2014 season. Several factors and people convinced him to return in 2015: athletic director Ray Tanner, his wife Jerri, his sons being on the coaching staff, all of the coaches having at least another year left on their deals, new defensive coordinator Jon Hoke, several junior college players joining the team, the opportunity to win 100 games at two different schools, and thinking that he had a decent team coming back. Spurrier would later say that "we thought we could scrap out eight wins or something like that."

Over the first half of the 2010s, South Carolina had won 49 games, the eleventh most in the country. However, coming off a 7–6 season and with questions at quarterback and defense, the Gamecocks were widely ranked as the fourth worst team in the SEC in the preseason. With Dylan Thompson departing to the NFL, redshirt sophomore Connor Mitch was named the starting quarterback for the entire year. South Carolina had a 2015 recruiting class that was ranked No. 20 by 247Sports, No. 17 by On3, and No. 19 by Rivals.com. All coaches on the staff were kept, while long-time NFL assistant coach Jon Hoke was hired as co-defensive coordinator.

In the 2015 season opener, South Carolina "escaped" North Carolina at a neutral site, with two endzone interceptions from Skai Moore. Opening conference play, the Gamecocks lost by four points at home to Kentucky, who had been on a 22-game road losing streak. It was the second consecutive loss to the Wildcats, and only the third in Spurrier's career. Mitch had also been injured, replaced by Perry Orth. Next, South Carolina was blown out on the road by No. 7 Georgia, with the defense allowing Bulldogs quarterback Greyson Lambert to throw the highest completion percentage in FBS history (minimum of twenty completions). It was South Carolina's first 0–2 SEC start since 2008. True freshman Lorenzo Nunez was announced as the new starting quarterback. Back at home, the Gamecocks hoped to snap the losing streak against UCF. However, the game was a "struggle" for the Gamecocks, who were losing at halftime, though they did eventually win. Following the game against UCF and the 2–2 start, Spurrier called athletic director Ray Tanner and informed him that he would try to finish the season but that he sensed his time at South Carolina was coming to an end. At Missouri, the first game in SEC history with two starting true freshman quarterbacks, Nunez threw three interceptions and the Gamecocks lost by two touchdowns. It was the second consecutive loss to the Tigers. Nunez had also suffered a sprained shoulder, with Orth again becoming the starter. The following game, against No. 7 LSU, was scheduled to take place at home, but instead was moved to Tiger Stadium due to severe flooding in South Carolina. On October 10, 2015, South Carolina played LSU, keeping it close in the first half but getting blown out in the second half to lose the game. By this point, South Carolina was 2–4 in the season, and 0–4 in conference play. It was Spurrier's first 0–4 SEC start in his career. The Gamecocks had also lost eight of their past nine SEC games dating back to last season. Spurrier's overall .637 winning percentage at South Carolina was still the highest above twenty games in program history and the highest since World War II, but the last two seasons represented a .473 winning percentage. The LSU game would prove to be the last of Spurrier's tenure.

=== Resignation ===
"Okay, first of all, I'm resigning. I'm not retiring. Get that part straight. I doubt if I'll ever be a head coach again, but, you know, maybe coaching a high school team or something. So don't say I've retired completely from coaching. Who knows what will come in the future? But, the last several years, as I travel around the country, seeing guys and so forth, I always get asked: 'How much longer are you going to coach?' And my answer is always the same. As long as we keep winning, keep winning these bowl games, everybody's happy, we're ranked, life's pretty good, I guess I can go several more years. But, if it starts going south, starts going bad, then I need to get out. You can't keep a head coach that's done it as long as I have, when it's heading in the wrong direction. And, really today, when I move out of the way, and Shawn Elliott's going to take over as the interim head coach, it sort of starts our rebuilding, or building back, what we had just two years ago. [...] I find that [announcing your last year] doesn't work a lot, because if the players know you're not going to be their coach after such and such of time, you just don't have the accountability, I think. And also, it [...] gives [Elliott] a chance to make his mark, for these next six games. [...] Back in '04, I think I was probably the best coach for this job, eleven years ago, but I'm not today. I'm not today. And that's the cycle of coaching. [...] And I just think it's the best thing. This is the best thing for South Carolina football, for our university, to start another building process."

— Steve Spurrier, his opening statement at his resignation press conference on October 13, 2015

On October 11, 2015, one day after the loss to LSU, Spurrier called South Carolina athletic director Ray Tanner and told him that he was contemplating resignation. Tanner and school president Harris Pastides tried to persuade Spurrier to coach through the end of the regular season, but were unsuccessful. On the night of October 12, after practice, Spurrier told his players that there was a "good chance" he would be stepping down. He would later speculate that this "surprised some, and maybe not others". Later that evening, Tanner and South Carolina deputy athletic director Charles Waddell met with several coaches and team captains in an effort to decide an interim head coach. Soon after, Tanner called offensive line coach/co-offensive coordinator Shawn Elliott to ask him to be the interim head coach, which he accepted. The next morning, October 13, Elliott conferred with the other coaches and some players, who showed their support for him. One of the players requested Spurrier to visit practice, which he did. Later that day, the University of South Carolina held a press conference, concerning Spurrier's resignation and the appointment of Elliott as interim head coach. In a letter to Gamecock fans, Spurrier would later further justify his resignation by saying that he saved the university three million dollars by forfeiting his buyout clause, that the team played better under Elliott, that he did not want a "Spurrier Farewell Tour", and that he essentially fired himself because he knew that the university would not fire him.

== Head coaching record ==
Year	Team	Overall	Conference	Standing	Bowl/playoffs	Coaches^{#}	AP^{°}
2005	South Carolina	7–5	5–3	T–2nd (Eastern)	L Independence		
2006	South Carolina	8–5	3–5	5th (Eastern)	W Liberty		
2007	South Carolina	6–6	3–5	T–4th (Eastern)			
2008	South Carolina	7–6	4–4	T–3rd (Eastern)	L Outback		
2009	South Carolina	7–6	3–5	T–4th (Eastern)	L PapaJohns.com		
2010	South Carolina	9–5	5–3	1st (Eastern)	L Chick-fil-A	22	22
2011	South Carolina	11–2	6–2	2nd (Eastern)	W Capital One	8	9
2012	South Carolina	11–2	6–2	3rd (Eastern)	W Outback	7	8
2013	South Carolina	11–2	6–2	2nd (Eastern)	W Capital One	4	4
2014	South Carolina	7–6	3–5	T–4th (Eastern)	W Independence		
2015	South Carolina	2–4	0–4	(Note: Spurrier resigned on October 12, 2015. Shawn Elliott was named interim head coach and led the Gamecocks to a final record of 3-9.)			
South Carolina:		86–49	44–40				
Total:							
National championship Conference title Conference division title or championship game berth
^{†}Indicates Bowl Coalition, Bowl Alliance, BCS, or CFP / New Years' Six bowl.; ^{#}Rankings from final Coaches Poll.; ^{°}Rankings from final AP Poll.

== Aftermath ==
=== Spurrier ===
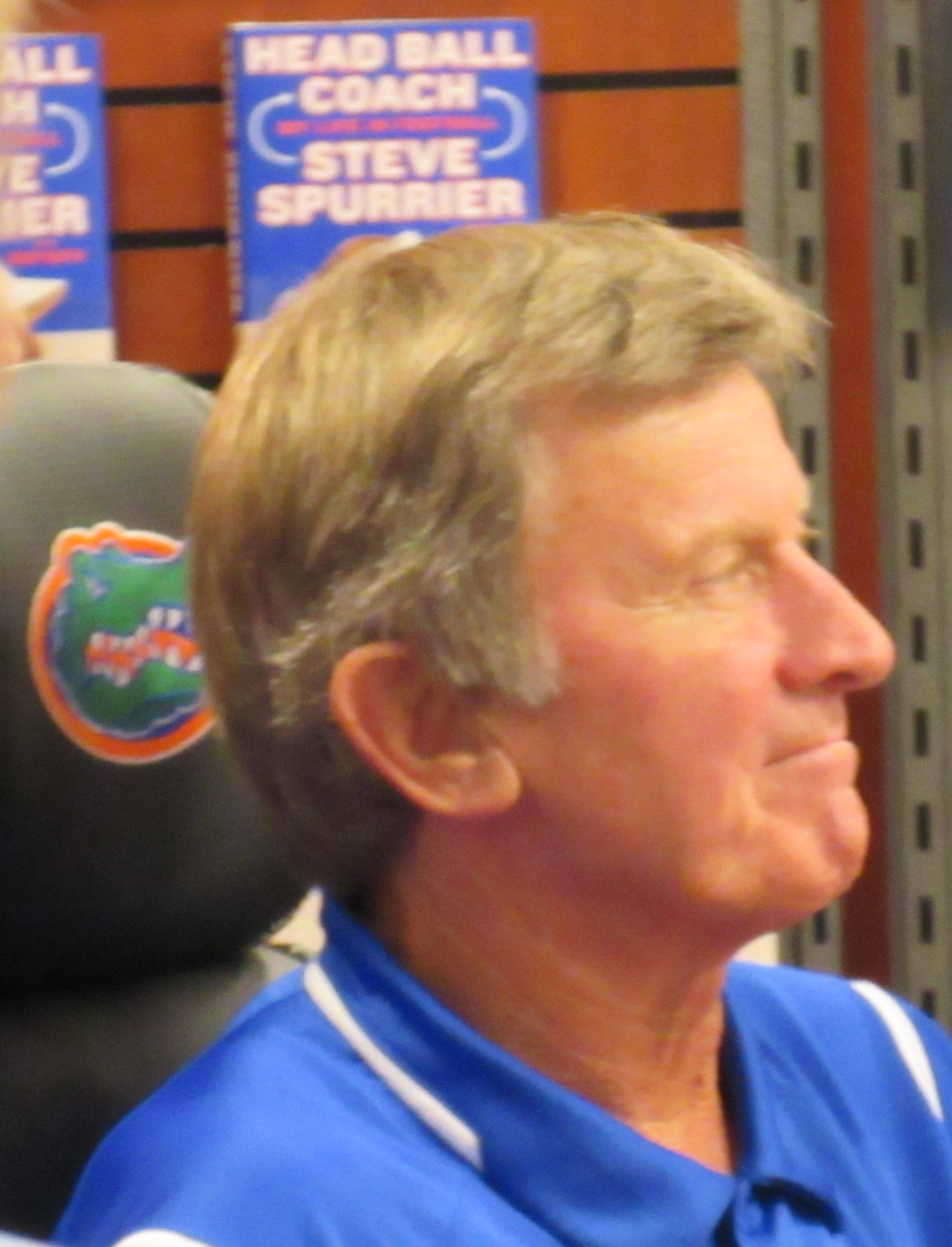
Spurrier in late 2016

In February 2016, Spurrier assumed a new role at the University of South Carolina: special assistant to the president and athletic director. He had a contract clause that allowed him to assume such a role, if he wanted.

In July 2016, he returned to the University of Florida, as ambassador and consultant for the Gators' athletic department. He said: "My wife, Jerri, and I are extremely thrilled to be returning home to our alma mater, and to Gainesville where we met on campus over fifty years ago. ... I also want to say thanks to the University of South Carolina for allowing me to be their coach from 2005 to 2015. Also a special thanks to all of the Gamecock players, coaches and fans that allowed our teams to set so many school records. I will now pull for South Carolina to win every game but one, just as I did when I pulled for Florida to win every game but one as the Gamecock coach."

However, the end of his South Carolina tenure "gnawed" at Spurrier for years. In April 2018, wanting to end his career as a winner, he made a return to coaching, being named the first head coach of the Orlando Apollos, part of the new Alliance of American Football. In February 2019, the Apollos began their first and only season. By April, the league was suspended; the Apollos' 7–1 record was the best of all eight teams, and they were declared champions by Spurrier and FanDuel. Spurrier was satisfied, feeling like he had earned some redemption from the end of his years with the Gamecocks.

Spurrier remains on the University of Florida's athletic staff, and will likely not return to coaching.

=== South Carolina ===
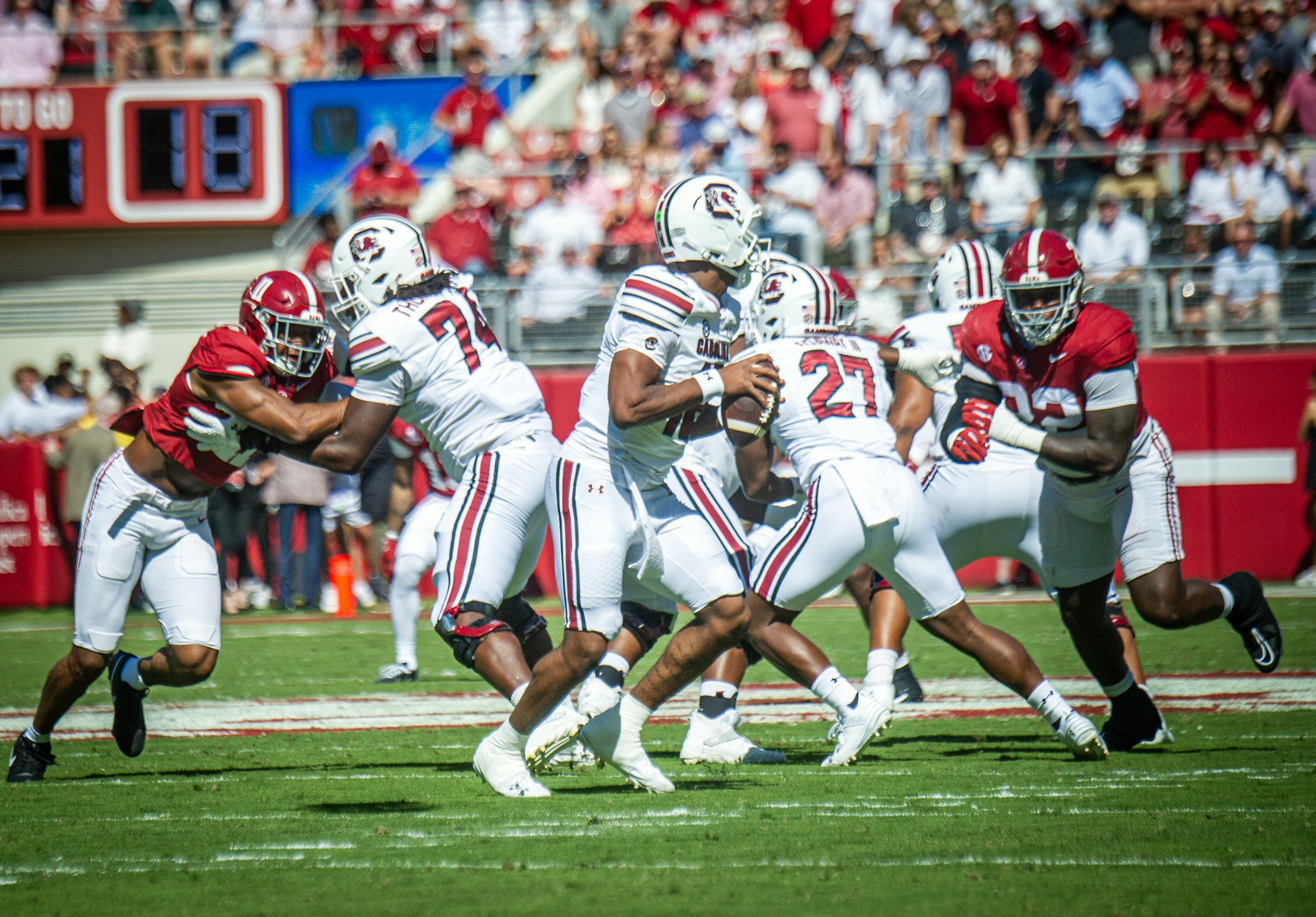
Gamecocks in 2024

Interim head coach Shawn Elliott, carrying Spurrier's visor onto the field, won his debut game, beating Vanderbilt. However, the Gamecocks then lost the last five games of the season. It was the longest losing streak since the end of Spurrier's 2007 season, and included a loss to The Citadel, the program's first loss to an FCS program since 1990. The 2015 team finished with a 3–9 record, with two wins and four losses coming under Spurrier, and one win and five losses coming under Elliott. It was South Carolina's first losing season since 2003 and worst record since 1999.

Elliott was not kept as head coach, and South Carolina instead hired Auburn defensive coordinator Will Muschamp as its new head coach in December 2015. In Muschamp's first three seasons, the Gamecocks attended a bowl game each year and broke the record for most wins in the first three seasons by a Gamecock head coach. The 2017 team posted nine wins. However, by his fifth season in 2020, Muschamp was 28–30, with three wins over ranked teams and none over Clemson, and he was fired. Mike Bobo subsequently took over as interim head coach, and lost the last three games of the season.

Bobo was not kept as head coach, and South Carolina instead hired Spurrier's former assistant Shane Beamer as its new head coach in December 2020. He remains their current head coach. Beamer broke Spurrier's record for most wins in the first four seasons by a Gamecock head coach, and he has the second most top-ten wins in program history, behind only Spurrier. He has also won SEC Coach of the Year. In 2022, after defeating back-to-back top-ten teams for the first time ever, South Carolina finished the season ranked for the first time since Spurrier's tenure. In 2024, the Gamecocks posted nine wins, including four over ranked teams, a school record.

== Analysis ==
=== Reasons for success ===
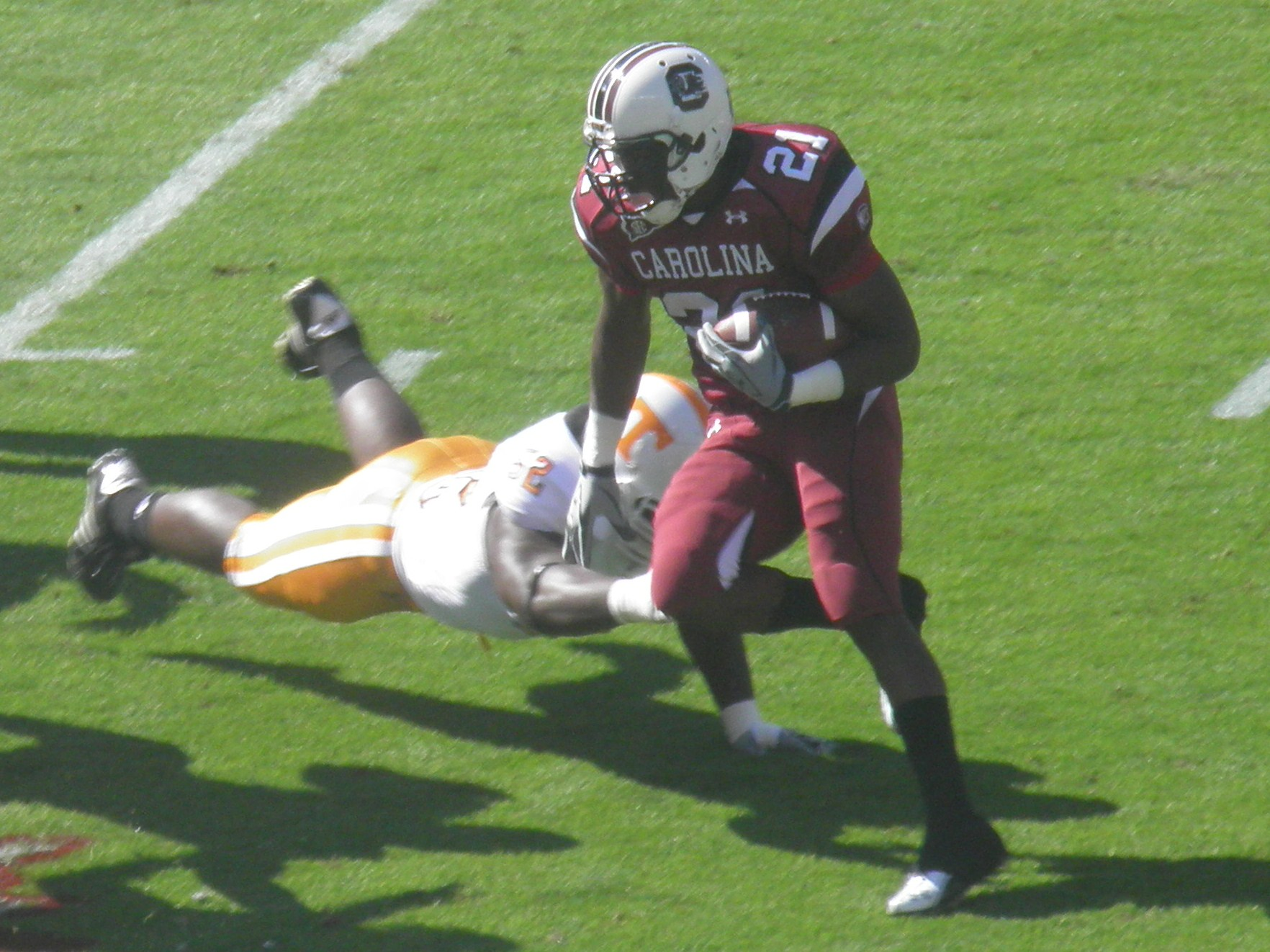
Marcus Lattimore was emblematic of the Gamecocks' talent and willingness to run the ball under Spurrier

In 2010, South Carolina's staff was full of assistant coaches who were considered excellent recruiters and evaluators; they also controlled the state in recruiting. This came at an auspicious time for the program, as the state was in a period of heightened high school football talent. Barrett Sallee of Bleacher Report would later comment that "the biggest reason for South Carolina's success [...] was program-defining players inside the Palmetto State who chose to go to the Gamecocks rather than Clemson or other major programs. Players like Marcus Lattimore, Stephon Gilmore, and Jadeveon Clowney are the exception to high school football in the state of South Carolina, not the rule." In early 2014, recruiting analyst Bud Elliott noted that South Carolina had turned in its best blue-chip ratio so far under Spurrier; he also commended the Gamecocks for their scouting. Although some other programs were still able to sign more highly rated recruits, the Gamecocks countered this by oversigning: they signed roughly 25 more athletes than both Georgia and Florida between 2008 and 2012.

Despite Spurrier being known for his high-powered passing offenses, his Gamecock teams relied more on the running game and stout defense. Rival coach Mark Richt commended him for his adaptability: "I think Coach Spurrier is doing what good coaches do. That is take your personnel, find out what they do best and what gives you the best chance of winning regardless of what you might think is a fun and exciting thing to do."

Of the three traditional powerhouses of the SEC East (Georgia, Florida, and Tennessee), the Volunteers were in a downturn for much of Spurrier's tenure, while the Bulldogs and Gators had a few less successful seasons. From 2011 to 2013, the Gamecocks also "notoriously started games hot at home", contributing to the longest home winning streak in the nation.

=== Reasons for shortcomings ===
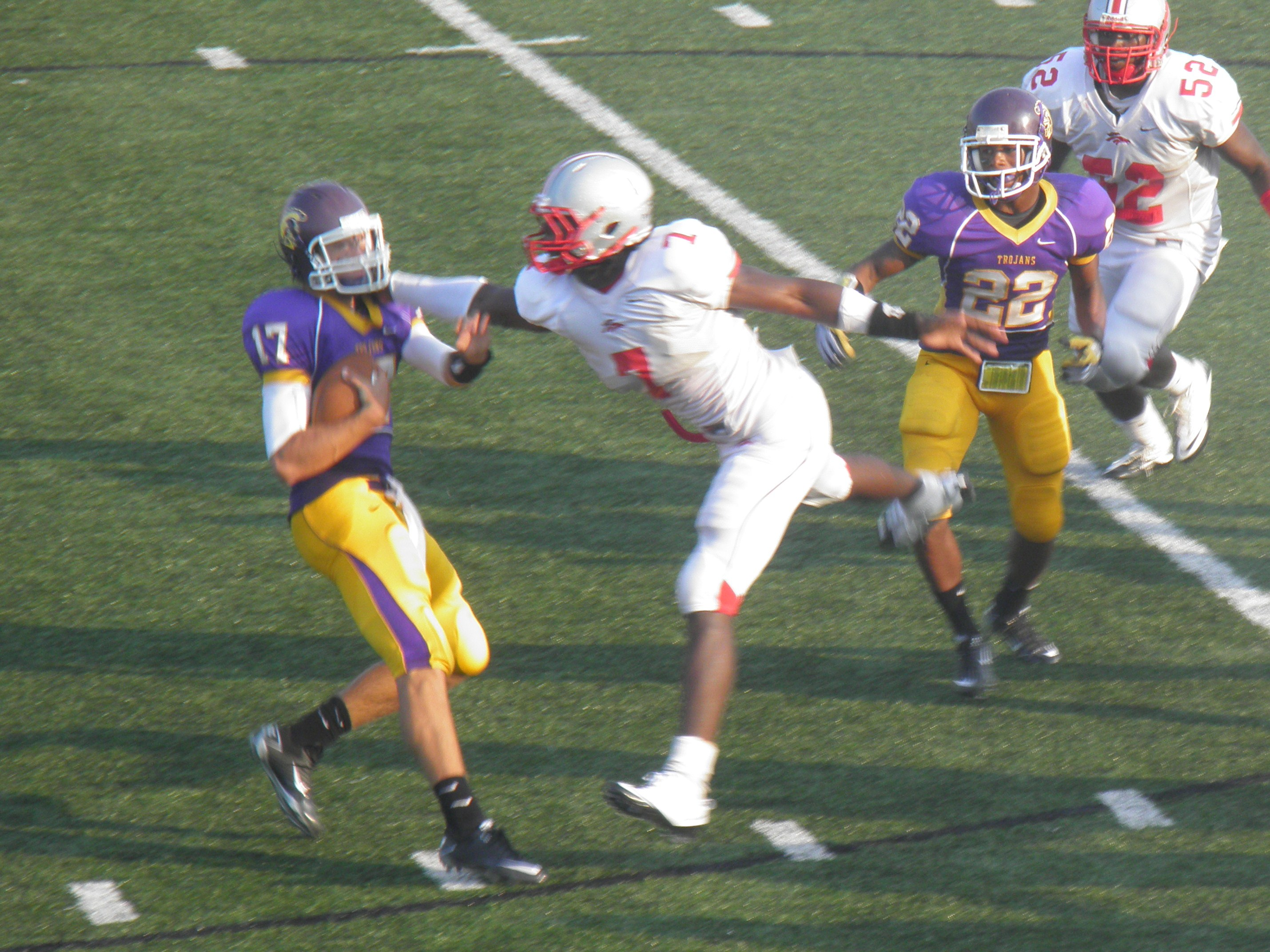
High school football players like Jadeveon Clowney are rare in South Carolina

Recruiting mistakes were cited as the reason for disappointing results in both the first five seasons and last two seasons of Spurrier's tenure. Spurrier said he also made mistakes on quarterbacks in his first five seasons. Recruiting coordinator Spurrier Jr. received much blame for the results near the end of his father's tenure, though Spurrier instead spread the recruiting blame among the entire staff. The state eventually stopped producing as many "program-defining" players. After the 2013 season, the talent on the roster began to dry up. The 2014 offense was still talented, but by 2015, the talent was considered lacking on both offense and defense. Spurrier's "two or three more years" comment in December 2014 greatly hurt recruiting. Recruiting had changed since his tenure at Florida, and Spurrier took no interest in recruiting younger players. His age was also cited as an increasing factor.

Spurrier has said that he did not "surround himself with the right personnel" near the end of his tenure. After 2010, South Carolina's skilled assistant coaches gradually left the program for other opportunities. In particular, the departures of Shane Beamer, Jay Graham, Ellis Johnson, Craig Fitzgerald, and Brad Lawing have been noted. All of the replacements for these coaches have been considered downgrades, who were not as strong in recruiting, developing, and/or coaching. Spurrier became less involved with the defense. The staff reportedly became complacent, which Spurrier would later blame on contract extensions after the 2013 season. The new coaching staff was a "disaster waiting to happen", one which Spurrier likely did not realize, since he did not need to make many skillful assistant hires at Florida.

== Legacy ==
=== Assessment ===
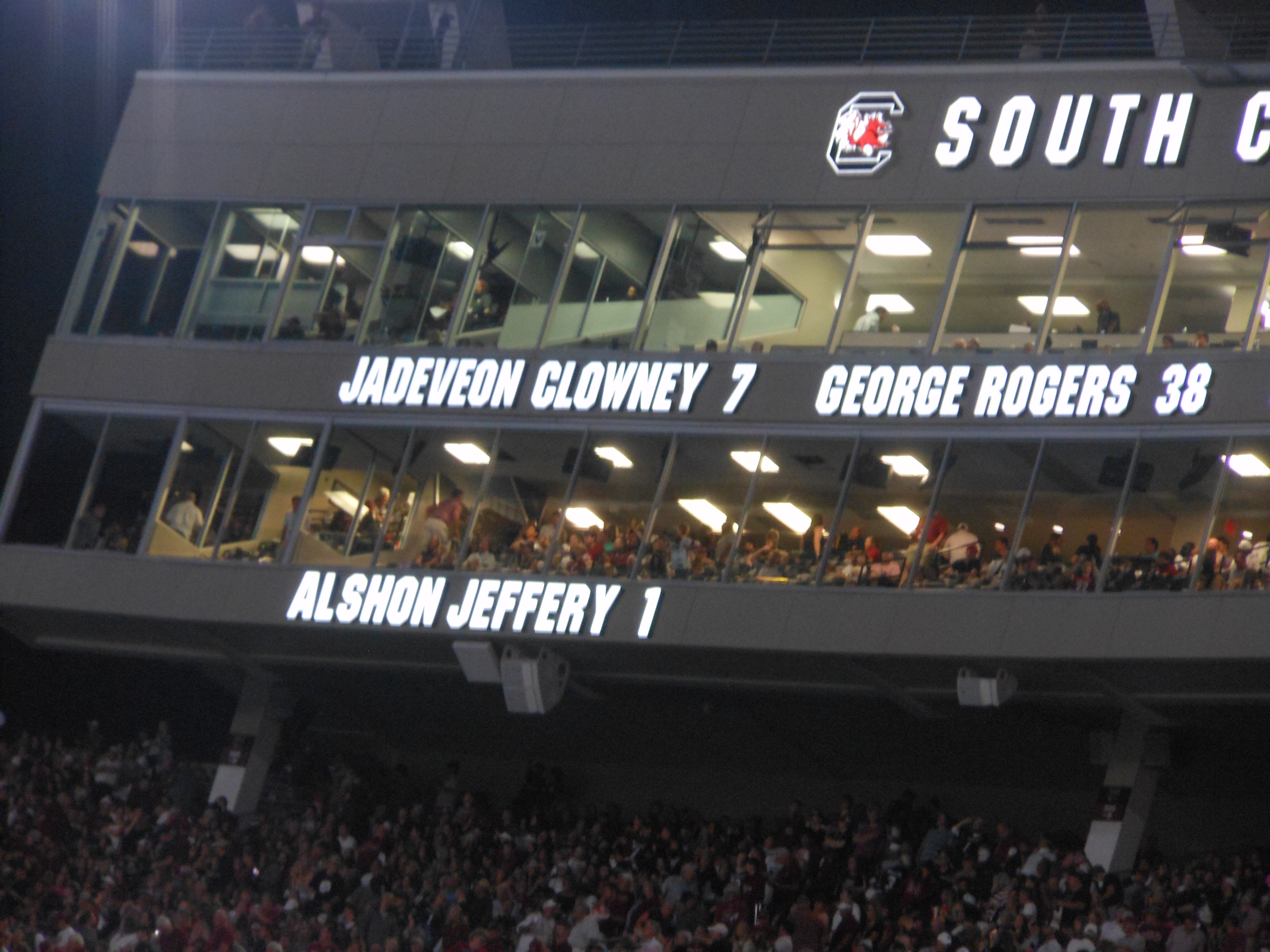
Two of the program's six retired jerseys played under Spurrier

Spurrier is often considered South Carolina's greatest football coach. (Note: Described as such by: Bleacher Report, Saturday Down South, Sports Illustrated, The State, a fan poll, and FanSided, even as early as before the 2011 season. Joseph Griffin of Sports Illustrated has commented that this ranking is "without a doubt", due to the fact that Spurrier owns the school's all-time wins record and is responsible for the school's three eleven-win seasons, when the school had only one ten-win season beforehand.) A 2021 fan poll conducted by The State ranked him as the university's third greatest coach of any sport, behind Dawn Staley and Ray Tanner. Journalists have weighed his Gamecocks tenure when ranking him among the greatest college football coaches. (Note: Ranked as such by several outlets, who have commended his winning record and rebuild at South Carolina. In a 2013 Bleacher Report article making the case for Spurrier as the greatest college football coach of all time, Amy Daughters concluded: “Indeed, what if, just as we’re being bedazzled by the fanatical Sabanization of college football, the ‘Ole ball coach at South Carolina is actually the best coach we’ve ever seen in the college game?”)

However, Spurrier's legacy is not unblemished. Some fans "still have a bitter taste in their mouths" regarding the end of his tenure; he received criticism for his resignation, which many characterized as quitting. Reflecting on his tenure, Spurrier has commented: "My one disappointment is we didn’t sneak in there and win the SEC. It was doable, but we just didn’t get it done.” Several media members have also suggested that, like many other Gamecock head football coaches, Spurrier's legacy at South Carolina is diminished due to him having greater association with another school; Joe Morrison and Shane Beamer have received more favorable assessments in this regard.

In a 2025 Saturday Down South article ranking the program's greatest players, six of the top nine had played under Spurrier. Seven players have been inducted into the school's athletic hall of fame, while two have had their jersey retired. A fewer number have also been regarded among the 21st century's best in the SEC or in all of college football. (Note: Multiple journalists have nominated Connor Shaw as the most underrated SEC football player of the 21st century. Sidney Rice, Alshon Jeffery, Marcus Lattimore, and Jadeveon Clowney have been ranked among the top SEC players of their era, at their respective positions. Clowney has appeared on 2010s All-Decade Teams, as well as lists of the greatest defensive players in college football history.)

The university has honored the 2010–2013 seasons as the program's "winningest time", a sentiment shared by several journalists. (Note: The four seasons specifically from 2010 to 2013 have been described as the program's "best run/stretch" or "golden/glory years" by: The State, CBS, Saturday Down South, and FanSided. Other journalists have applied a similar assessment to unclear or expanded time periods, such as the "best Spurrier years" or 2010–2014.) Marky Billson of Saturday Down South has written: "The 1984 Gamecocks showed the program’s potential. But by becoming only the twelfth team in college football history to win eleven games in three straight seasons, the 2013 Gamecocks lived up to it." Zach Barnett of FootballScoop has written that the era "means more in Columbia than one (national) title would in Tuscaloosa."

=== Lasting effects ===
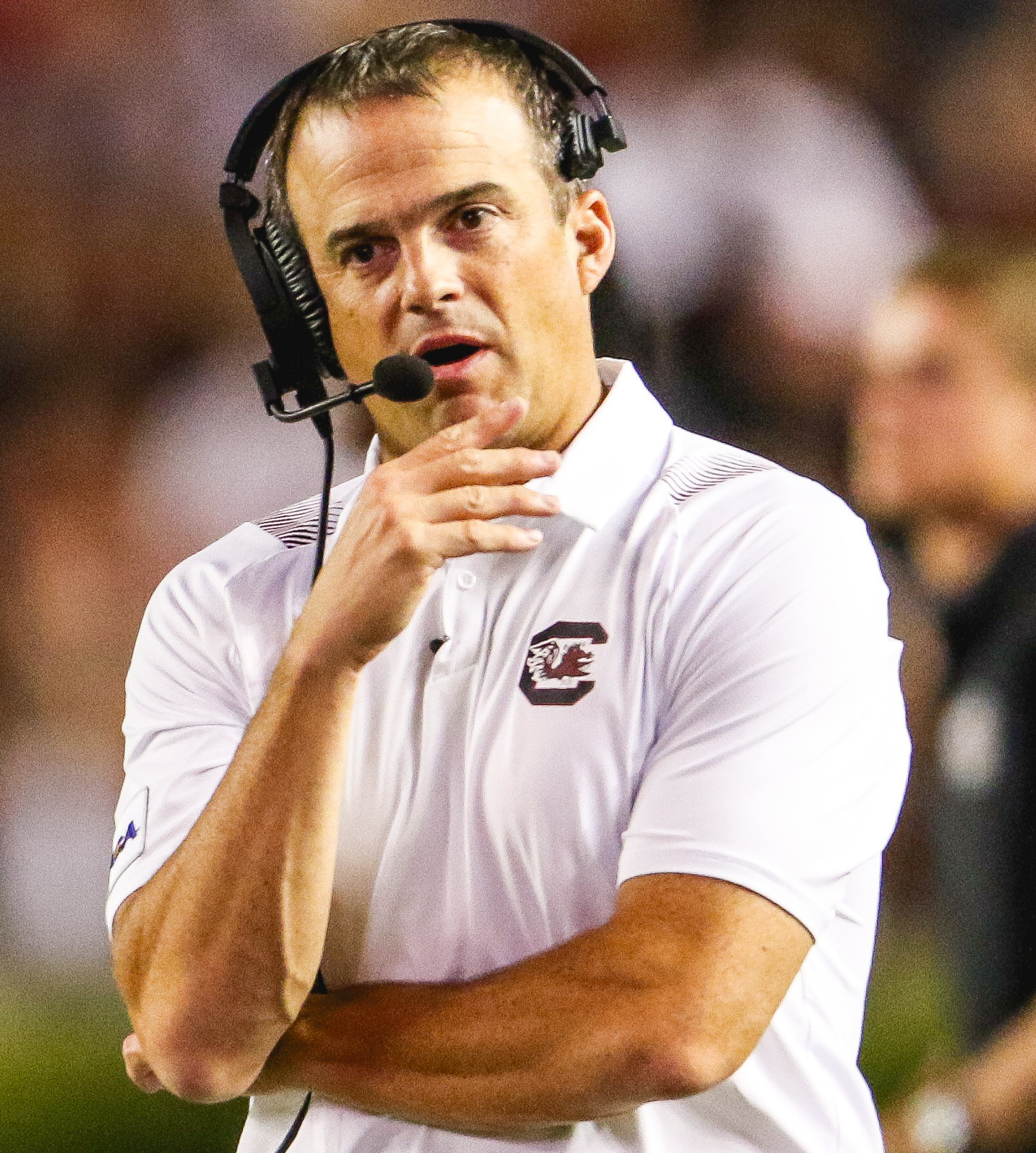
Former Spurrier assistant Shane Beamer

In 2004, the Gamecocks had only one $1 million donor, but by 2020, they had "a handful of big-money boosters". Spurrier has commented: "A lot of fans and donors who could give big money to South Carolina saw the light at the end of the tunnel. 'Hey, maybe we can win and win big. We can be relevant in football. We don’t have to look up to Florida and Georgia and Tennessee and all those guys anymore.' I think that really helped spur the boosters."

Spurrier's successor, Will Muschamp, was viewed with "raised expectations" by fans, who had been previously considered defeatist. (Note: Sources:) Both Spurrier and Hyman pushed back against the program's low standards after their arrival.

Shane Beamer, a former Spurrier assistant, replaced Muschamp as head coach. At his introductory press conference, Beamer said: "If (Spurrier) hadn't hired me back in 2007, I probably wouldn't be standing here today."

Several program traditions that began in the Spurrier era remain, including Sir Big Spur, (Note: Sir Big Spur, the University of South Carolina's official live gamecock mascot, debuted in baseball in 1999 but did not debut in football until 2006.) "Sandstorm", white rally towels, the "Welcome to Williams–Brice" pregame video, and the Gamecock Walk. By 2023, Beamer had described "Sandstorm" as being "synonymous with Gamecock athletics".

=== Honors ===
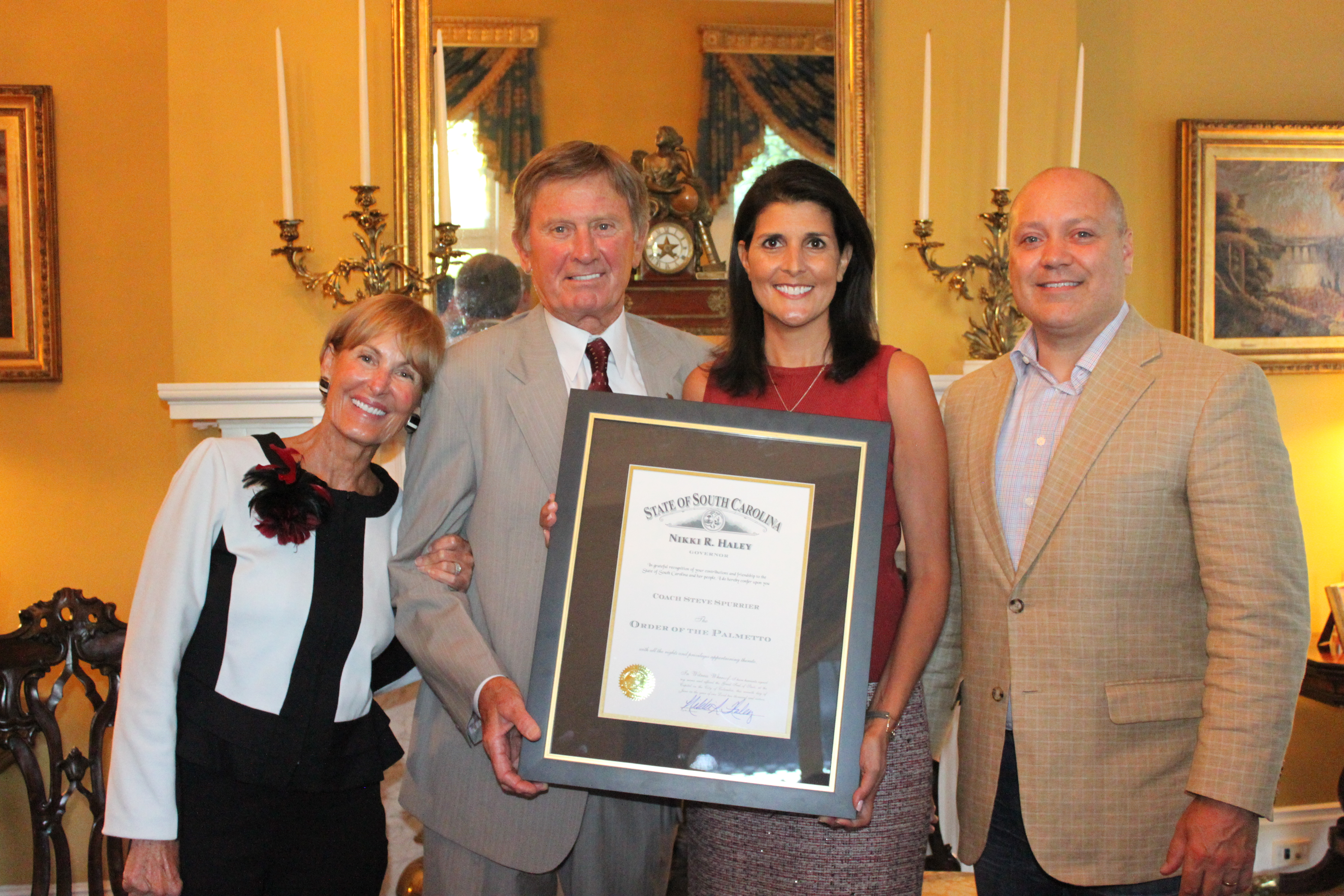
Spurrier receiving the Order of the Palmetto award

- College Football Hall of Fame: Steve Spurrier
- South Carolina Athletic Hall of Fame: Sidney Rice, Marcus Lattimore, Steve Spurrier
- South Carolina Football Hall of Fame: Steve Spurrier
- SEC Football Legends: Eric Norwood, Alshon Jeffery, Marcus Lattimore, Connor Shaw
- Order of the Palmetto: Steve Spurrier
- Retired jerseys: Jadeveon Clowney, Alshon Jeffery
- University of South Carolina Athletics Hall of Fame: Kenny McKinley, Sidney Rice, Eric Norwood, Marcus Lattimore, Connor Shaw, Mike McGee, Pharoh Cooper, Melvin Ingram
- Homer Rice Award: (Note: Given to an athletic director who has made significant and meaningful contributions to intercollegiate athletics) Mike McGee
- University of South Carolina's indoor football practice building named the "Jerri and Steve Spurrier Indoor Practice Facility"
- 2010–2013 teams honored during halftime of a South Carolina home football game in 2023
- Spurrier honored by a resolution of the South Carolina Legislature in 2014
