= Tocoi Creek High School =

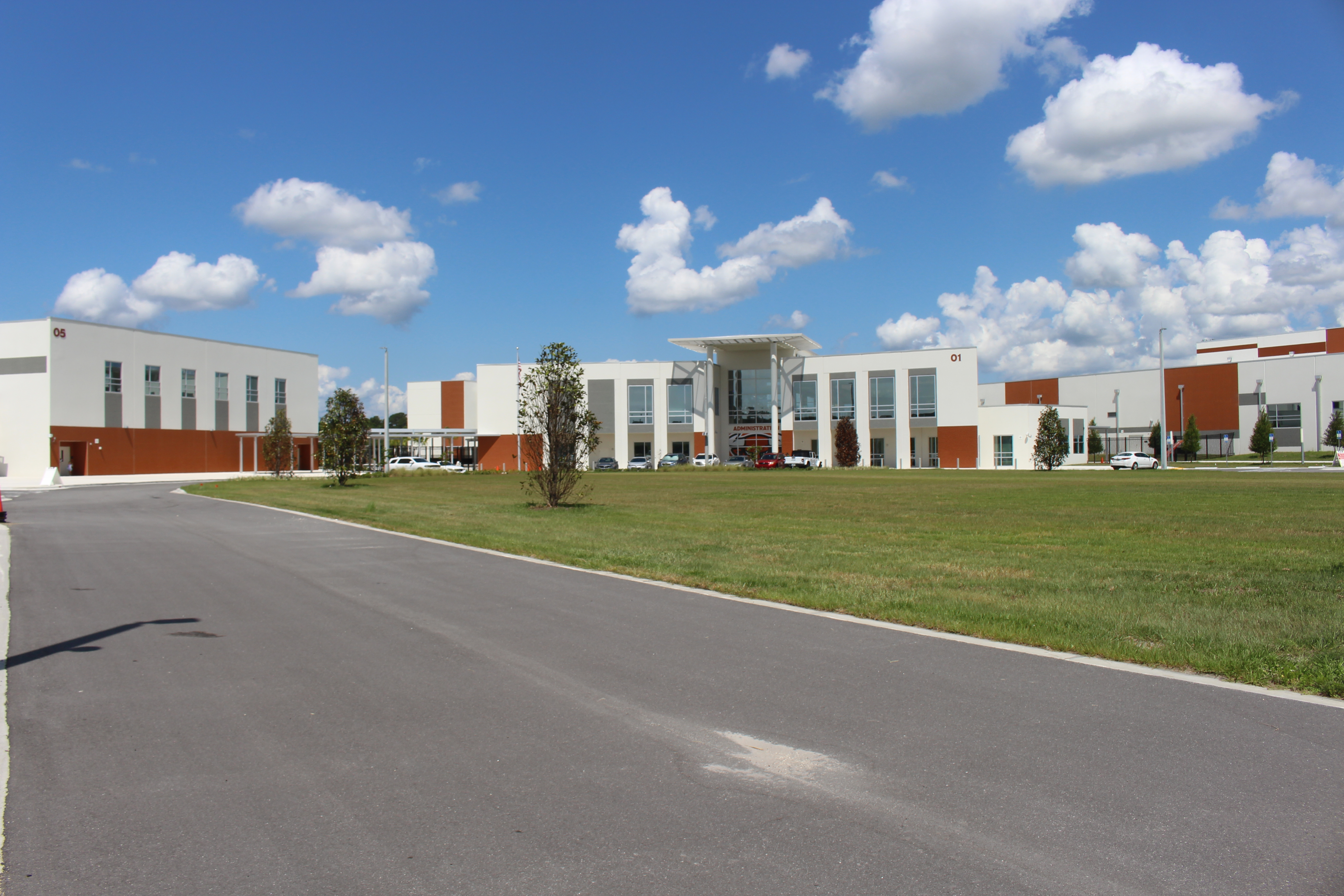

Location
- 11200 St. Johns Parkway; St. Augustine, Florida 32092; United States; 29°58′8.2″N 81°29′19.9″W

Information
- Type: Public high school
- Established: 2021
- School district: St. Johns County School District
- Superintendent: Dr. Brennan Asplen
- Principal: Kelly Jacobson
- Staff: 95.00 (FTE)
- Grades: 9-12
- Enrollment: 2,731 (2026-2027)
- Student to teacher ratio: 25.00
- Campus size: 68.79 acres
- Colors: Burnt Orange; Gunmetal Gray; Black
- Team name: Toros
- Rivals: Beachside High School
- Website: tchs.stjohns.k12.fl.us

Tocoi Creek High School (TCHS) is a public high school in the World Golf Village census-designated place, in north central area of St. Johns County, Florida near St. Augustine. It is part of the St. Johns County School District and opened to students for the 2021-22 academic year.

World Golf Village and the Silverleaf Community are zoned to Tocoi Creek.

== Overview ==
TCHS operated with students in grades 9-11 for its first year in 2021-22, and has offered grade 12 since the following academic year. Three career academy labs, which focus on healthcare, emerging technologies, and construction management, are available along with a dual enrollment program to earn college credits through St. Johns River State College. The school also offers Advanced Placement coursework.

The school has an established full performance band, orchestra, and jazz ensembles and hosts theatrical productions in its dedicated auditorium.

With the addition of TCHS, the school district adjusted attendance zoning so some students who previously attended Allen D. Nease High School and Bartram Trail High School will instead attend the new school. The primary feeder schools are Pacetti Bay Middle School, Mill Creek Academy, and by the 2028-2029 school year, Magnolia Oaks Academy.

== Namesake ==
The school is named after a tributary of the St. Johns River called Tocoi Creek, which was once home to the settlement of Tocoi. Tocoi is a Timucuan word that means water lily, and the indigenous Timucua lived in what is now present day northern Florida and southeast Georgia.

The name was chosen by the St. Johns County school board on December 8, 2020. The board considered the name North River High School, but ultimately Tocoi Creek High School received the majority of votes.

== History ==
Construction of TCHS was funded by a half-cent sales tax approved by county residents. Culpepper Construction Company of Tallahassee secured a $60.8 million contract to build the school, and the school was designed by Orlando-based SchenkelShultz Architecture.

In December 2020, the school announced its nickname would be the Toros with school colors of burnt orange, gunmetal gray, and black. The Toros logo and visual identity was designed by Rhodes Branding, a marketing agency based in Columbia, South Carolina. During the mascot naming process, the school's inaugural principal, Jay Willets, said that bulls or toros would be an appropriate name because the land the school now sits on was a cow pasture prior to the school's construction. This land was formerly owned by the Pacetti family who sold the 68.79 acre plot to the school district for just over $7 million in August 2019.

TCHS was initially anticipated to open to students on August 10, 2021, but the St. Johns County school board voted to delay the start of the county's 2021-22 school year by 6 days, in part to give a cushion for more time to complete construction projects at TCHS and Pine Island Academy, a new Kindergarten through eighth grade school in the county.

=== Controversy ===
In August 2022, an incident between TCHS assistant principal Erin Lynn and dean and football coach Jerry Kyle Skipper sparked an investigation by the school district. The incident involved sexual misconduct in the workplace between Lynn and Skipper, and both were put on administrative leave by the school district for inappropriate actions in November 2022. Lynn resigned four days after being put on administrative leave while Skipper faced termination for "interactions with another colleague that involved flirtatious and sexual misconduct in and out of the workplace."

== Athletics ==
TCHS offers athletics programs in football, volleyball, baseball, softball, swimming and diving, soccer, lacrosse, basketball, tennis, golf, weightlifting, cross country, track and field, competitive cheer, competitive dance, competitive marching band, and wrestling.

The school's athletic director announced in February 2021 that TCHS would be hiring over 60 athletic staff positions and that the Toros have partnered with Baker's Sporting Goods of Jacksonville and adidas for equipment and apparel.

=== Football ===
The Toros competed as an independent in football for their inaugural season in 2021, a decision made by the Florida High School Athletic Association. The first football game in school history was scheduled against Paxon on August 20, 2021, and took place at St. Augustine High School.
