= Florida's 6th congressional district =

U.S. House district for Florida

Coordinates: 29°27′28″N 81°21′7″W

- Map of district boundaries since January 3, 2023 (Note: The district includes the same census blocks as drawn for the 2020 redistricting cycle in 2022 and during mid-decade redistricting in 2026. As such, boundaries of the district will not change at the 2026 elections.) (Interactive map version)
- Representative: Randy Fine; R–Melbourne Beach
- Area: 2,682 mi^{2} (6,950 km^{2})
- Population (2025): 877,547
- Median household income: $69,253
- Ethnicity: 71.3% White; 11.5% Hispanic; 11.0% Black; 3.9% Two or more races; 1.5% Asian; 0.8% other
- Cook PVI: R+14

Florida's 6th congressional district is a congressional district in the U.S. state of Florida. The district is located on the Eastern Florida Coast and stretches from south of Saint Augustine to South Daytona and inland to the southwest to the outskirts of Ocala, Leesburg and Sanford. It includes the city of Daytona Beach.

From 2003 to 2013, the district stretched from the St. Johns River and Jacksonville, sweeping through North Central Florida, encompassing portions of Gainesville and Ocala, and meandered down to the northern tip of the Greater Orlando area in Lake County. It included all of Bradford and Gilchrist counties and portions of Alachua, Clay, Duval, Lake, Levy, and Marion counties. Most of this district is now the 3rd district, while the current 6th covers most of the territory that was previously in the 7th district.

From 2013 to 2018, the district was represented by future Governor of Florida and 2024 Republican presidential candidate Ron DeSantis. From 2019 to 2025, the district was represented by former U.S. national security advisor Mike Waltz.

The district is currently represented in the U.S. Congress by Republican Randy Fine, who took office on April 2, 2025.

== Voting ==
=== Recent election results from statewide races ===
Year	Office	Results
2008	President	McCain 52%–46%
2010	Senate	Rubio 54%–19%
2010	Governor	Scott 56%–44%
2010	Attorney General	Bondi 58%–35%
2010	Chief Financial Officer	Atwater 58%–33%
2012	President	Romney 56%–44%
2012	Senate	Nelson 50%–47%
2014	Governor	Scott 58%–42%
2016	President	Trump 60%–36%
2016	Senate	Rubio 59%–36%
2018	Senate	Scott 60%–39%
2018	Governor	DeSantis 60%–39%
2018	Attorney General	Moody 63%–36%
2018	Chief Financial Officer	Patronis 62%–38%
2020	President	Trump 61%–38%
2022	Senate	Rubio 66%–33%
2022	Governor	DeSantis 68%–31%
2022	Attorney General	Moody 70%–30%
2022	Chief Financial Officer	Patronis 68%–32%
2024	President	Trump 65%–35%
2024	Senate	Scott 63%–35%

=== Voter registration ===
The district contains over 525,000 registered voters, of whom just over 39% are Democratic, while slightly more than 41% identify as Republican.

== Composition ==
For the 118th and successive Congresses (based on redistricting following the 2020 census), the district contains all or portions of the following counties and communities:

Flagler County (5)

All 5 communities

Lake County (14)

Altoona, Astor, Eustis, Lady Lake, Lake Kathryn, Lake Mack-Forest Hills, Lisbon, Mount Dora, Mount Plymouth (part; also 11th), Sorrento, Paisley, Pine Lakes, Pittman, Umatilla

Marion County (7)

Belleview, Lake Kerr, Ocklawaha, Silver Springs, Silver Springs Shores, Silver Springs Shores East, The Villages (part; also 11th; shared with Sumter County)

Putnam County (6)

All 6 communities

St. Johns County (6)

Butler Beach, Crescent Beach, Flagler Estates, Hastings, St. Augustine Shores, St. Augustine South

Volusia County (12)

Daytona Beach, DeLand, DeLand Southwest, De Leon Springs, Holly Hill, North DeLand, Ormond Beach, Ormond-by-the-Sea, Pierson, Seville, South Daytona, West DeLand

== List of members representing the district ==
Member	Party	Years	Cong ress	Electoral history	
District created January 3, 1945
Dwight L. Rogers (Fort Lauderdale)	Democratic	January 3, 1945 – December 1, 1954	79th 80th 81st 82nd 83rd	Elected in 1944; Re-elected in 1946. Re-elected in 1948. Re-elected in 1950. Re-elected in 1952. Re-elected in 1954 but died.	
Vacant		December 1, 1954 – January 11, 1955	83rd 84th		
Paul Rogers (West Palm Beach)	Democratic	January 11, 1955 – January 3, 1967	84th 85th 86th 87th 88th 89th	Elected to finish his father's term. Re-elected in 1956. Re-elected in 1958. Re-elected in 1960. Re-elected in 1962. Re-elected in 1964. Redistricted to the 9th district.	
Sam Gibbons (Tampa)	Democratic	January 3, 1967 – January 3, 1973	90th 91st 92nd	Redistricted from the 10th district and re-elected in 1966. Re-elected in 1968. Re-elected in 1970. Redistricted to the 7th district.	
Bill Young (St. Petersburg)	Republican	January 3, 1973 – January 3, 1983	93rd 94th 95th 96th 97th	Redistricted from the 8th district and re-elected in 1972. Re-elected in 1974. Re-elected in 1976. Re-elected in 1978. Re-elected in 1980. Redistricted to the 8th district.	
Buddy MacKay (Ocala)	Democratic	January 3, 1983 – January 3, 1989	98th 99th 100th	Elected in 1982. Re-elected in 1984. Re-elected in 1986. Retired to run for U.S. Senate.	
Cliff Stearns (Ocala)	Republican	January 3, 1989 – January 3, 2013	101st 102nd 103rd 104th 105th 106th 107th 108th 109th 110th 111th 112th	Elected in 1988. Re-elected in 1990. Re-elected in 1992. Re-elected in 1994. Re-elected in 1996. Re-elected in 1998. Re-elected in 2000. Re-elected in 2002. Re-elected in 2004. Re-elected in 2006. Re-elected in 2008. Re-elected in 2010. Redistricted to the 3rd district and lost renomination.	
Cliff Stearns (Ocala)	Republican	January 3, 1989 – January 3, 2013	101st 102nd 103rd 104th 105th 106th 107th 108th 109th 110th 111th 112th	Elected in 1988. Re-elected in 1990. Re-elected in 1992. Re-elected in 1994. Re-elected in 1996. Re-elected in 1998. Re-elected in 2000. Re-elected in 2002. Re-elected in 2004. Re-elected in 2006. Re-elected in 2008. Re-elected in 2010. Redistricted to the 3rd district and lost renomination.	1993–2003 [data missing]
Cliff Stearns (Ocala)	Republican	January 3, 1989 – January 3, 2013	101st 102nd 103rd 104th 105th 106th 107th 108th 109th 110th 111th 112th	Elected in 1988. Re-elected in 1990. Re-elected in 1992. Re-elected in 1994. Re-elected in 1996. Re-elected in 1998. Re-elected in 2000. Re-elected in 2002. Re-elected in 2004. Re-elected in 2006. Re-elected in 2008. Re-elected in 2010. Redistricted to the 3rd district and lost renomination.	2003–2013
Ron DeSantis (Ponte Vedra Beach)	Republican	January 3, 2013 – September 10, 2018	113th 114th 115th	Elected in 2012. Re-elected in 2014. Re-elected in 2016. Resigned to run for Governor of Florida.	2013–2017
Ron DeSantis (Ponte Vedra Beach)	Republican	January 3, 2013 – September 10, 2018	113th 114th 115th	Elected in 2012. Re-elected in 2014. Re-elected in 2016. Resigned to run for Governor of Florida.	2017–2023
Vacant		September 10, 2018 – January 3, 2019	115th		2017–2023
Mike Waltz (St. Augustine Beach)	Republican	January 3, 2019 – January 20, 2025	116th 117th 118th 119th	Elected in 2018. Re-elected in 2020. Re-elected in 2022. Re-elected in 2024. Resigned to become National Security Advisor.	2017–2023
Mike Waltz (St. Augustine Beach)	Republican	January 3, 2019 – January 20, 2025	116th 117th 118th 119th	Elected in 2018. Re-elected in 2020. Re-elected in 2022. Re-elected in 2024. Resigned to become National Security Advisor.	2023–present
Vacant		January 20, 2025 – April 2, 2025	119th		2023–present
Randy Fine (Melbourne Beach)	Republican	April 2, 2025 – present	119th	Elected to finish Waltz's term. Re-elected in 2026.	2023–present

== Election results ==
=== 2000 ===
2000 Florida's 6th congressional district election
Party	Candidate	Votes	%
Republican	Cliff Stearns (incumbent)	178,789	99.9
Write-In	Timothy Clower	152	0.1
Write-In	Barbara Elliott	31	0.0
Total votes		178,972	100.0
Republican hold			

=== 2002 ===
2002 Florida's 6th congressional district election
Party	Candidate	Votes	%
Republican	Cliff Stearns (incumbent)	141,570	65.35
Democratic	Dave Bruderly	75,046	34.65
Total votes		216,616	100.00
Republican hold			

=== 2004 ===
2004 Florida's 6th congressional district election
Party	Candidate	Votes	%
Republican	Cliff Stearns (incumbent)	211,137	64.40
Democratic	Dave Bruderly	116,680	35.59
No party	Others	36	0.01
Total votes		327,853	100.00
Republican hold			

=== 2006 ===
2006 Florida's 6th congressional district election
Party	Candidate	Votes	%
Republican	Cliff Stearns (incumbent)	136,601	59.88
Democratic	Dave Bruderly	91,528	40.12
Total votes		228,129	100.00
Republican hold			

=== 2008 ===
2008 Florida's 6th congressional district election
Party	Candidate	Votes	%
Republican	Cliff Stearns (incumbent)	228,302	60.89
Democratic	Tim Cunha	146,655	39.11
Total votes		374,957	100.00
Republican hold			

=== 2010 ===
2010 Florida's 6th congressional district election
Party	Candidate	Votes	%
Republican	Cliff Stearns (incumbent)	179,349	71.46
Independent	Steven E. Schonberg	71,632	28.54
Total votes		250,981	100.00
Republican hold			

=== 2016 ===
2016 Florida's 6th congressional district election
Party	Candidate	Votes	%
Republican	Ron DeSantis (incumbent)	213,519	58.6
Democratic	Bill McCullough	151,051	41.4
Total votes		364,570	100.0
Republican hold			

=== 2018 ===
2018 Florida's 6th congressional district election
Party	Candidate	Votes	%
Republican	Mike Waltz	187,891	56.31%
Democratic	Nancy Soderberg	145,758	43.69%
Total votes		333,649	100%
Republican hold			

=== 2020 ===
2020 Florida's 6th congressional district election
Party	Candidate	Votes	%
Republican	Mike Waltz (incumbent)	265,393	60.63%
Democratic	Clint Curtis	172,305	39.37%
Total votes		437,698	100.0
Republican hold			

=== 2022 ===
2022 Florida's 6th congressional district election
Party	Candidate	Votes	%
Republican	Mike Waltz (incumbent)	226,548	75.33%
Libertarian	Joseph Hannoush	74,207	24.67%
Total votes		300,755	100.0
Republican hold			

=== 2024 ===
2024 Florida's 6th congressional district election
Party	Candidate	Votes	%
Republican	Mike Waltz (incumbent)	284,414	66.53
Democratic	James Stockton III	143,050	33.46
Write-in	Richard Dembinsky	10	0.00
Total votes		427,474	100.00
Republican hold			

=== 2025 (special) ===
2025 Florida's 6th congressional district special election
Party	Candidate	Votes	%
Republican	Randy Fine	110,764	56.66%
Democratic	Josh Weil	83,485	42.71%
Libertarian	Andrew Parrott	701	0.36%
Independent	Randall Terry	525	0.27%
Total votes		195,475	100.0%
Republican hold			
