= 1955 Florida's 6th congressional district special election =

- January 11, 1955

Florida's 6th congressional district
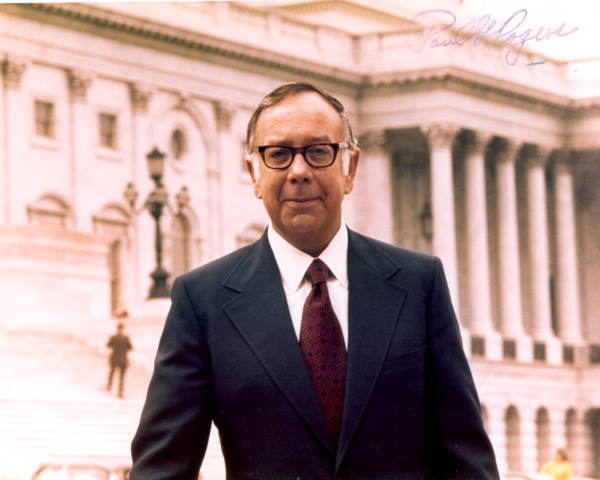

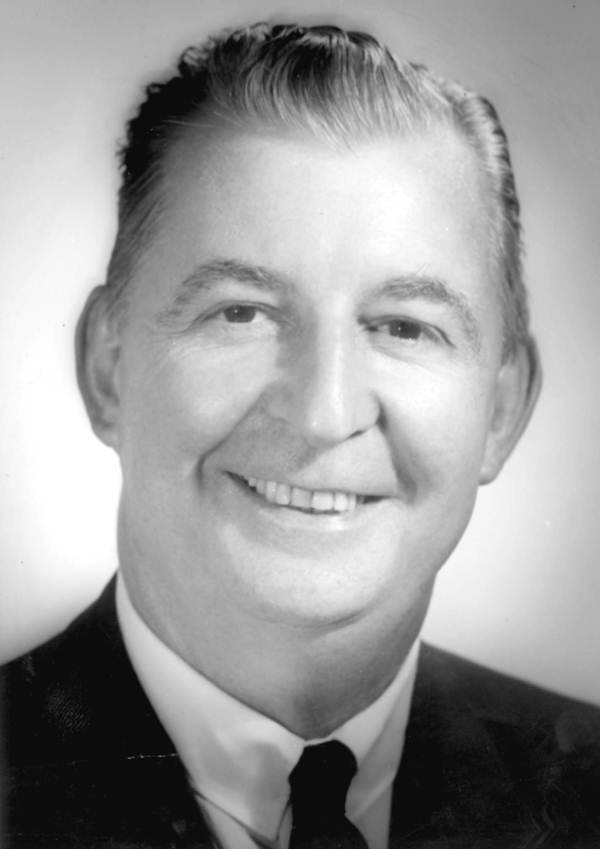
Nominee	Paul Rogers	J. Herbert Burke
Party	Democratic	Republican
Popular vote	29,094	21,147
Percentage	58.7%	41.3%
Representative before election
Dwight L. Rogers
Democratic
Elected Representative
Paul Rogers
Democratic

On January 11, 1955, voters in Florida's 6th congressional district elected Democrat Paul Rogers to the United States House of Representatives. His father, Dwight L. Rogers, was the incumbent and had just been re-elected to the term in November 1954, but died December 1, 1954.

== Results ==
Unofficial returns
Party	Candidate	Votes	%
Democratic	Paul Rogers	29,094	58.7
Republican	J. Herbert Burke	21,147	41.3
Democratic hold			

== See also ==
- 1954 United States House of Representatives elections

== Sources ==
- "Florida Democrat Wins / Rogers Is Elected to Succeed Late Father in Congress". The New York Times. January 12, 1955. p. 36.
