= Tocoi Creek =

Tributary of St. Johns River, Florida

Coordinates: 29°51′40″N 81°33′10″W

Tocoi Creek is a tributary of the St. Johns River in St. Johns County, Florida. Kayakers report seeing abundant wildlife including turtles, alligators, and osprey and what is left of an old steamship dock as they paddle the creek. The creek is named after a Timucuan word that means water lily. The indigenous Timucua lived in the area prior to European contact in the 1500s through about 1800.

Its southern bank was once the home to the settlement of Tocoi. The area was a transportation hub in the late 1800s, but it is now considered a ghost town. In 1872, author Harriet Beecher Stowe, who spent winters in nearby Jacksonville from 1867 to 1884, reportedly called the landing at Tocoi Creek "a shed and a sand-bank and a little shanty, where to those who require, refreshments are served."

The St. Johns County school board voted to name its newest high school, Tocoi Creek High School, after the creek in December 2020. The school will open in 2021.
