= Pedro Menendez High School =

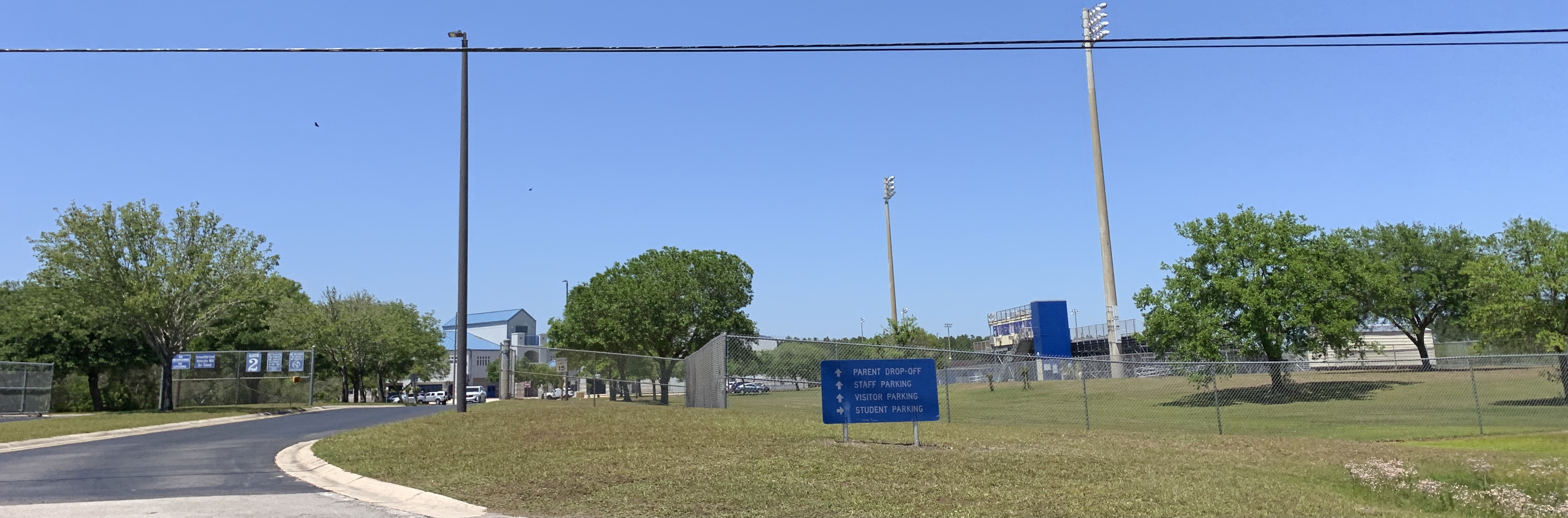

Location
- 600 State Road 206 West. St. Augustine, Florida 32086; United States; 29°45′24.80″N 81°19′57.37″W

Information
- Type: Public school
- Motto: Latin: Non scholae, sed vitae discimus. (Not for school, but for life, we learn.)
- Established: 2000; 26 years ago
- Status: Open
- School district: St. Johns County School District
- Superintendent: Dr. Brennan Asplen
- School number: 401
- Dean: Ronnell Ray, Yanetta Smith
- Principal: Ted Banton
- Staff: 74.00 (FTE)
- Grades: 9 - 12
- Enrollment: 1,177 (2026-2027)
- Student to teacher ratio: 20.07
- Hours in school day: 9:35 a.m. - 4:05 p.m.
- Campus size: 100 acres (0.40 km^{2})
- Campus type: Rural
- Colours: Royal blue and Vegas gold
- Nickname: Falcons
- Rival: St. Augustine High School
- Website: www-pmhs.stjohns.k12.fl.us

Pedro Menendez High School is a public high school in the St. Johns County School District, located in southern St. Johns County, Florida, United States. It was named for Pedro Menéndez de Avilés, a sixteenth-century Spanish admiral and pirate hunter who founded St. Augustine, the first permanent European settlement and oldest port city in what is now the continental United States, on August 28, 1565.

It has a student body of over 1,300 students. The school building is a two-story octagon with an open courtyard in the center. The gymnasium and auditorium are attached on the east and west sides, respectively. The school was built simultaneously with Bartram Trail High School; Menendez was intended to relieve overcrowding at St. Augustine High School. The school opened August 28, 2000, and graduated its first class in 2001.

The curriculum offers academy programs in the areas of business & computer technology, health science, and architectural & building sciences.

== Attendance boundary ==
Communities within the school's attendance boundary include: Butler Beach, Crescent Beach, Flagler Estates, Hastings, Marineland, St. Augustine Shores, and St. Augustine South. It also includes a small portion of St. Augustine Beach.

== Advanced scholarship ==
The Advanced Scholars program gives students the option to participate in the rigorous programs of advanced placement, dual enrollment and honors courses. After two years of preliminary work, the school was approved for the International Baccalaureate Program, beginning in the Fall of 2010.

== Notable alumni ==
- Zack Bryant (born 1997), basketball player in the Israeli Basketball Premier League
- Willie Harvey Jr., NFL player
- Travis Hutson, politician
- Kenny Logan Jr., professional football player for the Edmonton Elks, formerly played at Kansas University.
- Tony Steward, former linebacker for the Buffalo Bills and New Orleans Saints; winner of the 2010 Dick Butkus Award, given annually to the top high school linebacker in the country
