= Beachside High School =

High school in St. Johns County School District opened 2022

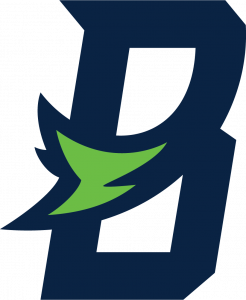

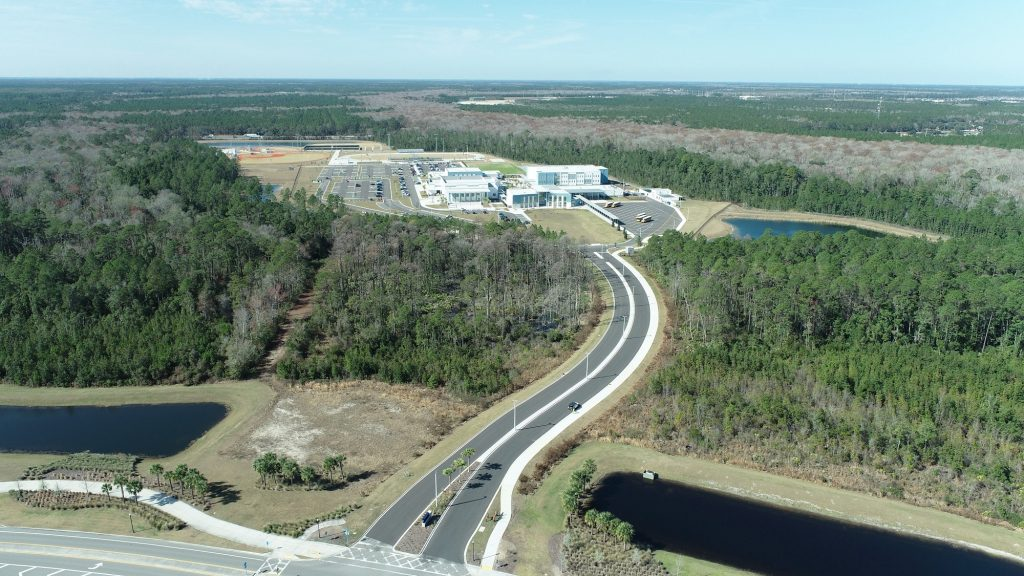

Location
- 200 Great Barracuda Wy; St. Johns, St. Johns County, Florida 32259; United States; 30.0851°N 81.4910°W

Information
- School type: Public high school
- Established: 2022
- School district: St. Johns County School District
- Superintendent: Dr. Brennan Asplen
- Principal: Greg Bergamasco
- Teaching staff: 87.00 (FTE)
- Age range: 14-18
- Enrollment: 2,341 (2026-2027)
- Student to teacher ratio: 25.45
- Colors: Navy, lime green and gray
- Nickname: Barracudas
- Rivals: Tocoi Creek High School
- Website: https://www-bhs.stjohns.k12.fl.us

Beachside High School is a new public high school in the St. Johns County School District near CR-210 and I-95 in the Jacksonville, Florida unincorporated community in the United States.

The primary feeder schools are Liberty Pines Academy, Lakeside Academy, and Trout Creek Academy. Additional students are also zoned to Fruit Cove Middle School and Durbin Creek Elementary as well as Switzerland Point Middle School and Timberlin Creek Elementary School Beachside was built to alleviate overcrowding and quality at Bartram Trail High School as well as Allen D. Nease High School.

Beachside High School is the only high school built in St. Johns county that is located within a residential community. It is located in a far corner of the Beachwalk community.

== Naming ==
Although it was assumed the board would call the school Sampson High School from a meeting at the time, the school was named Beachside because of its close proximity to the artificial beach created from the 14-acre lagoon named Beachwalk. Member of the board, Kelly Barrera said it was "almost humorous" because the school isn't even remotely close to a natural beach at all.

== History ==
In the schools first year, the school opened 3 days later than all other high schools in the county due to construction delays. Likewise to Tocoi Creek, its first year the school only had grades 9–11.

== Academics ==
Beachside is a member of the AICE program organized by The University of Cambridge.

Beachside has 3 academies: The Academy of Veterinary and Biomedical Sciences, The Academy of Global Logistics and Supply Chain Management, and The Academy of Information Technology.

== Athletics ==
Beachside football competed as an independent in its first year. They are competing under head coach Pete Duffy. The Barracudas made the FHSAA 5A playoffs in the 2024-2025 season, with a regular season record of 7-3. They returned to the playoffs in the 2025-2026 season, also winning their first postseason game and a district title. That same year, the barracudas had 11 players earn All-County recognition, including 5 first team All-County winners; Owen Carey (K), James Harding (OT), Eddie Jordan (QB), Marco Lanza (LB), and Drew Watson (WR/ATH).

Beachside High School is partnered with Nike for much of its athletic equipment.
