= World Golf Foundation =

The World Golf Foundation (WGF) is a nonprofit organization, formed in 1994, to promote the sport of golf. It was originally formed to oversee the establishment of the World Golf Hall of Fame at World Golf Village in Florida. The organization also operates the "First Tee" program, established in 1997 to provide educational programs to young people.

== See also ==
- Game of Golf Institute
