= St. Johns County Soil and Water Conservation District =

Government organization in St. Johns County, Florida

Coordinates: 29.6434°N 81.5897°W

The St. Johns County Soil and Water Conservation District (SWCD), located in St. Johns County, Florida is a government entity dedicated to encouraging productive use of land, water and air resources in the county. According to a summary taken from Florida Statutes Ch. 582, the Board's powers include conducting surveys, investigations, research and demonstrational projects relating to soil and water conservation (in areas like irrigation, water quality, and soil erosion).

== District supervisors ==
SWCD supervisors do not receive monetary compensation, and, for the most part, conduct their activities on their own time. Supervisors are members of a five-person board for the district, to which they can either be elected or appointed.

The current district supervisors are:

- Group 1 - John Sykes
- Group 2 - Wayne Smith
- Group 3 - Henry C. Warner
- Group 4 - Craig Hartwig
- Group 5 - Pam Livingston Way
