= St. Johns Technical High School =

Coordinates: 29°55′21″N 81°20′45″W

Location
- 2980 Collins Road; St. Augustine, Florida 32084; United States

Information
- Type: Public School
- Established: 2004
- Closed: 2026
- School district: St. Johns County School District
- Superintendent: Dr. Brennan Asplen
- Principal: Nigel Pillay
- Staff: 19.00 (FTE)
- Grades: 9-12
- Enrollment: 218 (2022-2023)
- Average class size: 16
- Student to teacher ratio: 11.47
- Hours in school day: 9:15 am - 3:45 pm
- Mascot: Wolves

St. Johns Technical High School was a public high school located in St. Augustine, Florida. The school closed before the 2026-2027 school year as a cost saving measure in response to a $15 million budget shortfall. St. Johns was combined with St. Augustine High School, and an Early Career Program was created.

The school was created in 2004, and it was designed to provide at-risk students with an academic program with technical training in a more personalized learning environment."
