= List of parks in St. Augustine =

== St. Augustine, Florida/St. Johns County, Florida Parks ==
- Alpine Groves Park
- Al Wilkie Park
- Armstrong Park
- Barnes Family Park
- Bird Island Park
- BMX Track
- Boating Club Road Boat Ramp
- Butler Park - East
- Butler Park - West
- Calvin Peete Recreation Complex
- Canopy Shores Park
- Chase Field
- Cornerstone Park
- Crescent Beach Park
- Cunningham Creek School Park
- Davenport Park
- Davis Park
- Deep Creek Canoe Launch
- DeLeon Shores Park
- Doug Crane Boat Ramp
- Downtown Plazas & Marina
- Durbin Creek Canoe Launch
- Eddie Vickers Park
- Equestrian Center
- Events Fields & Swing Park
- Flagler Estates Park
- Francis Field
- Ft. Matanzas Fishing Pier
- Fruit Cove School Park
- Galimore Community Center & Pool
- Gamble Rodgers School Park
- Green Road Boat Ramp
- Hastings Community Center
- Helen Mellon Schmidt Park
- J. Edward Cox Recreation Facility
- Jack Wright Island
- Julington Creek Plantation Park
- Joe Pomar Park
- Ketterlinus Gym
- Landrum School Park
- Lighthouse Park
- Mantanzas Inlet Fishing Bridge
- Micklers Beachfront
- Mills Field
- Nease Beachfront Park
- North Shores Park
- North Beach Park
- Ocean Palms School Park
- Oglethorpe Park
- Old Shands Bridge Pier
- Oliver Road Park
- Palencia Park
- Palm Valley Boat Ramp
- Palmetto Road Boat Ramp
- Palmo Boat Ramp
- Palmo Community Park
- Paws Dog Park
- Plantation Park
- Ponte Vedra Library Park
- Pope Road Beach Parking
- Rails to Trails
- Rattlesnake Island
- Ravenswood Park
- Riverdale Park & Boat Ramp
- Riverdale Boat Ramp
- Robert Laryn Skate Park
- Ron Parker Park
- SE Intracostal Waterway Park
- Shore Drive Park & Boat Ramp
- South Ponte Vedra Park
- St. Augustine Amphitheatre
- St. Augustine S. Boat Ramp
- St. Augustine S. Shore Dr. Park
- St. Augustine South Tot Lot
- St. Johns County Fishing Pier
- St. Johns County Golf Course
- St. Johns County Ocean Park
- St. Johns River Park - Bennett
- Surfside Park
- Switzerland Community Center
- Switzerland Point School Park
- Tocoi Junction Park
- Treaty Park
- Trout Creek Park
- Turnbull Park
- Vaill Point Park
- Vermont Heights Park
- Vickers Park & Galimore Center
- Vilano Boat Ramp
- Vilano Beach Fishing Pier & Pavilion
- Vilano Beach Fountain & Pavilion
- Vilano Nature Greenway
- Village of Vilano Park
- Windswept Acres Park
