= Pacetti =

Pacetti is an Italian surname. Notable people with the surname include:

- Camillo Pacetti (1758–1826), Italian sculptor
- Giovanni Battista Pacetti (1593–1630), Italian painter
- Iva Pacetti (1898–1981), Italian operatic soprano
- Massimo Pacetti (born 1962), Canadian politician
- Phillip Michael Pacetti, vocalist, keyboardist, guitarist, lyricist, songwriter and music producer
- Vincenzo Pacetti (1746–1820), Italian sculptor and restorer, brother of Camillo Pacetti

== See also ==
- Salvador Pacetti and Paulo Virgínio road, named in honor of Italian pharmacist Salvador Pacetti
- Pachattiri
- Pacoti
- Pakicetid
- Pescetti
