= St. Augustine Shores, Florida =

- CDP
- Location in St. Johns County and the state of Florida
- Coordinates: 29°48′14″N 81°18′31″W
- Country: United States
- State: Florida
- County: St. Johns

Area
  - Total: 4.48 sq mi (11.60 km^{2})
  - Land: 4.38 sq mi (11.35 km^{2})
  - Water: 0.093 sq mi (0.24 km^{2})
- Elevation: 26 ft (7.9 m)

Population (2020)
  - Total: 8,706
  - Density: 1,985.8/sq mi (766.72/km^{2})
- Time zone: UTC-5 (Eastern (EST))
  - Summer (DST): UTC-4 (EDT)
- FIPS code: 12-62550
- GNIS feature ID: 2403502

St. Augustine Shores or Saint Augustine Shores is a census-designated place (CDP) in St. Johns County, Florida, United States. As of the 2020 census, the population was 8,706, up from 7,359 at the 2010 census. It is part of the Jacksonville, Florida Metropolitan Statistical Area.

== Geography ==
According to the United States Census Bureau, the CDP has a total area of 3.5 square miles (9.0 km^{2}), of which 3.4 square miles (8.9 km^{2}) is land and 0.04 square mile (0.1 km^{2}) (0.86%) is water.

== Demographics ==
Historical population
| Census | Pop. | Note | %± |
|---|---|---|---|
| 1990 | 4,411 | | — |
| 2000 | 4,922 | | 11.6% |
| 2010 | 7,359 | | 49.5% |
| 2020 | 8,706 | | 18.3% |
U.S. Decennial Census

=== 2020 census ===
As of the 2020 census, St. Augustine Shores had a population of 8,706. The median age was 57.2 years. 13.8% of residents were under the age of 18 and 35.9% of residents were 65 years of age or older. For every 100 females there were 85.0 males, and for every 100 females age 18 and over there were 81.3 males age 18 and over.

100.0% of residents lived in urban areas, while 0.0% lived in rural areas.

There were 4,196 households in St. Augustine Shores, of which 17.4% had children under the age of 18 living in them. Of all households, 46.1% were married-couple households, 15.4% were households with a male householder and no spouse or partner present, and 32.6% were households with a female householder and no spouse or partner present. About 33.1% of all households were made up of individuals and 21.0% had someone living alone who was 65 years of age or older.

There were 4,737 housing units, of which 11.4% were vacant. The homeowner vacancy rate was 2.8% and the rental vacancy rate was 7.4%.

Racial composition as of the 2020 census
| Race | Number | Percent |
|---|---|---|
| White | 7,655 | 87.9% |
| Black or African American | 197 | 2.3% |
| American Indian and Alaska Native | 22 | 0.3% |
| Asian | 130 | 1.5% |
| Native Hawaiian and Other Pacific Islander | 4 | 0.0% |
| Some other race | 106 | 1.2% |
| Two or more races | 592 | 6.8% |
| Hispanic or Latino (of any race) | 593 | 6.8% |

=== 2000 census ===
At the 2000 census there were 4,922 people, 2,269 households, and 1,490 families in the CDP. The population density was 1,431.6 inhabitants per square mile (552.7/km^{2}). There were 2,567 housing units at an average density of 746.7 per square mile (288.3/km^{2}). The racial makeup of the CDP was 95.25% White, 2.03% African American, 0.16% Native American, 1.12% Asian, 0.08% Pacific Islander, 0.59% from other races, and 0.77% from two or more races. Hispanic or Latino of any race were 3.09%.

Of the 2,269 households 19.0% had children under the age of 18 living with them, 54.5% were married couples living together, 8.6% had a female householder with no husband present, and 34.3% were non-families. 28.7% of households were one person and 19.3% were one person aged 65 or older. The average household size was 2.16 and the average family size was 2.63.

The age distribution was 17.1% under the age of 18, 3.9% from 18 to 24, 21.8% from 25 to 44, 23.2% from 45 to 64, and 34.0% 65 or older. The median age was 51 years. For every 100 females, there were 83.5 males. For every 100 females age 18 and over, there were 77.9 males.

The median household income was $40,417 and the median family income was $46,682. Males had a median income of $35,081 versus $26,250 for females. The per capita income for the CDP was $20,374. About 4.4% of families and 6.9% of the population were below the poverty line, including 8.9% of those under age 18 and 4.4% of those age 65 or over.

== Education ==
It is in the St. Johns County School District.

Zoned schools include W. D. Hartley Elementary School, Gamble Rogers Middle School, and Pedro Menendez High School.
