= Ronald L. Bailey =

United States Marine Corps general

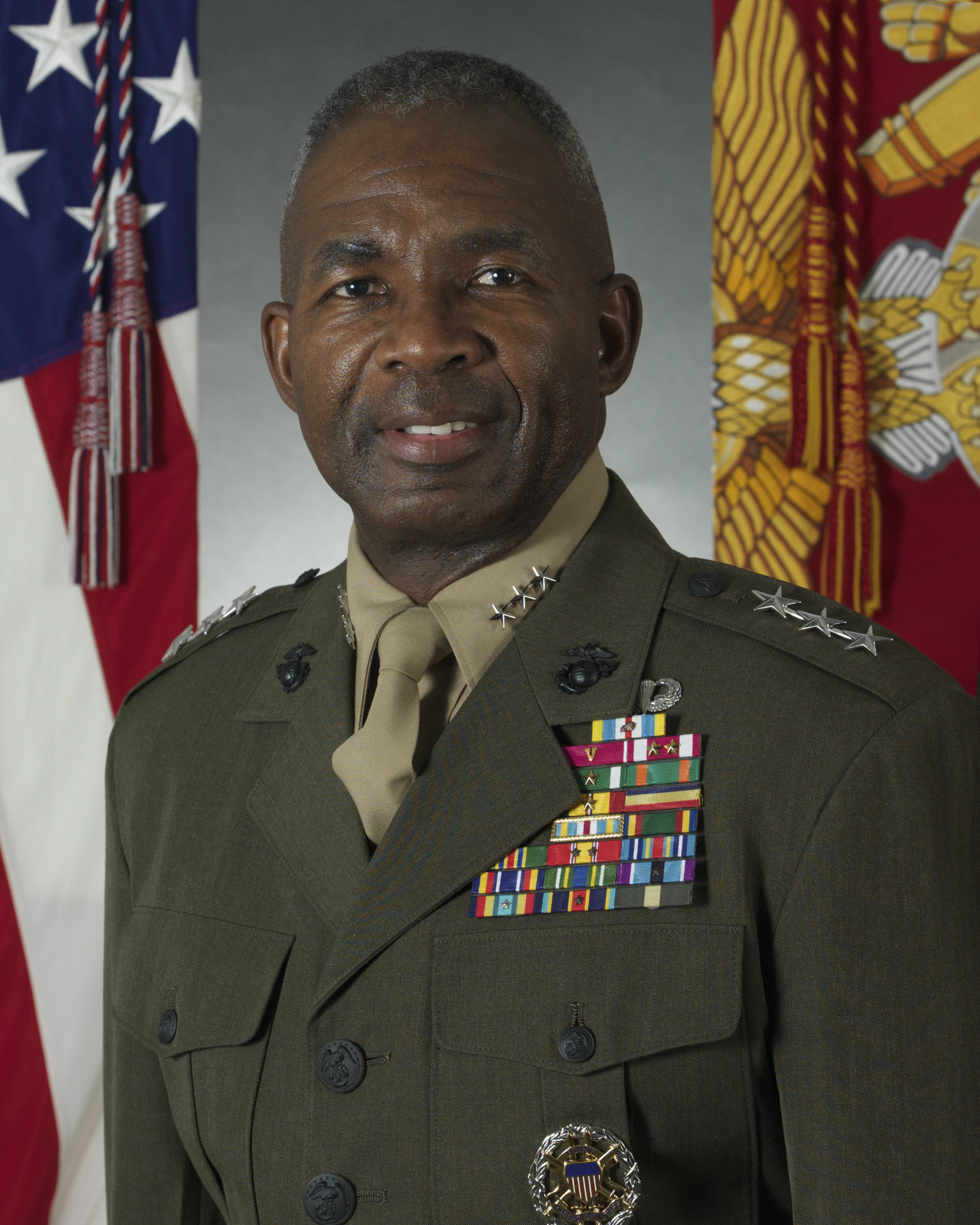
- Military career
- Allegiance: United States of America
- Branch: United States Marine Corps
- Service years: 1977– 2017
- Rank: Lieutenant General
- Commands: 2nd Light Armored Reconnaissance Battalion 2nd Marine Regiment; 3rd Marine Expeditionary Brigade; 1st Marine Division Marine Corps Recruiting Command
- Awards: Defense Superior Service Medal (2)

Ronald L. Bailey is a retired lieutenant general in the United States Marine Corps. He was the first African American to command the 1st Marine Division, from 2011 to 2013.

== Education ==
Bailey attended St. Augustine High School in St. Augustine, Florida, before graduating from Austin Peay State University in Clarksville, Tennessee in 1977 and was commissioned a Marine second lieutenant that same year. He is a Life Member of Alpha Phi Alpha fraternity. He served as an infantry officer.

When appointed to the Marine Corps Recruiting Command, Bailey said "...leadership is about influence and relationships – relationships with the American people. Our nation’s citizens expect us to be America’s expeditionary force in readiness committed to their protection at home and abroad; we will honor that expectation with the professional and empathetic execution of our mission within their communities nationwide."

== Career ==
Bailey was appointed in January 2011 to head the Marine Corps Recruiting Command, where he commanded more than 22,000 troops. He also served as commanding general of Marine Corps Recruit Depot San Diego.

In June 2013, Bailey was promoted to lieutenant general and assigned to Headquarters Marine Corps as the Deputy Commandant for Plans, Policies, and Operations. Bailey retired from the United States Marine Corps after 41 years of service, on July 31, 2017. In 2020 he was honored with a historic marker at Collier-Blocker-Puryear Park in his hometown of St. Augustine, Florida.

In 2020, he was Vice-President for Institutional Advancement at Austin Peay State University in Tennessee, the university from which he graduated in 1977. After that, he became Vice President, Industry Development at the National Electrical Contractors Association.

He is a director of the Travis Manion Foundation.
