= Derek V. Smith =

American businessman

- Born: Sayville, New York
- Education: Pennsylvania State University; Georgia Institute of Technology

Derek V. Smith was the CEO of ChoicePoint from 1997 until its acquisition by Reed Elsevier. Previously, Smith was an executive for Equifax. He holds degrees from Penn State and Georgia Tech.

In 2005, Smith came under scrutiny alongside Doug C. Curling, ChoicePoint's president, for earning $16.6 million by selling ChoicePoint stock following a major security breach. In 2009, he became a minority owner of the Atlanta Falcons. He is also chairman of the Game of Golf Institute and on the board of directors of Geeknet and the Georgia Aquarium.
