= St. Augustine Beach, Florida =

- City
- City of St. Augustine Beach
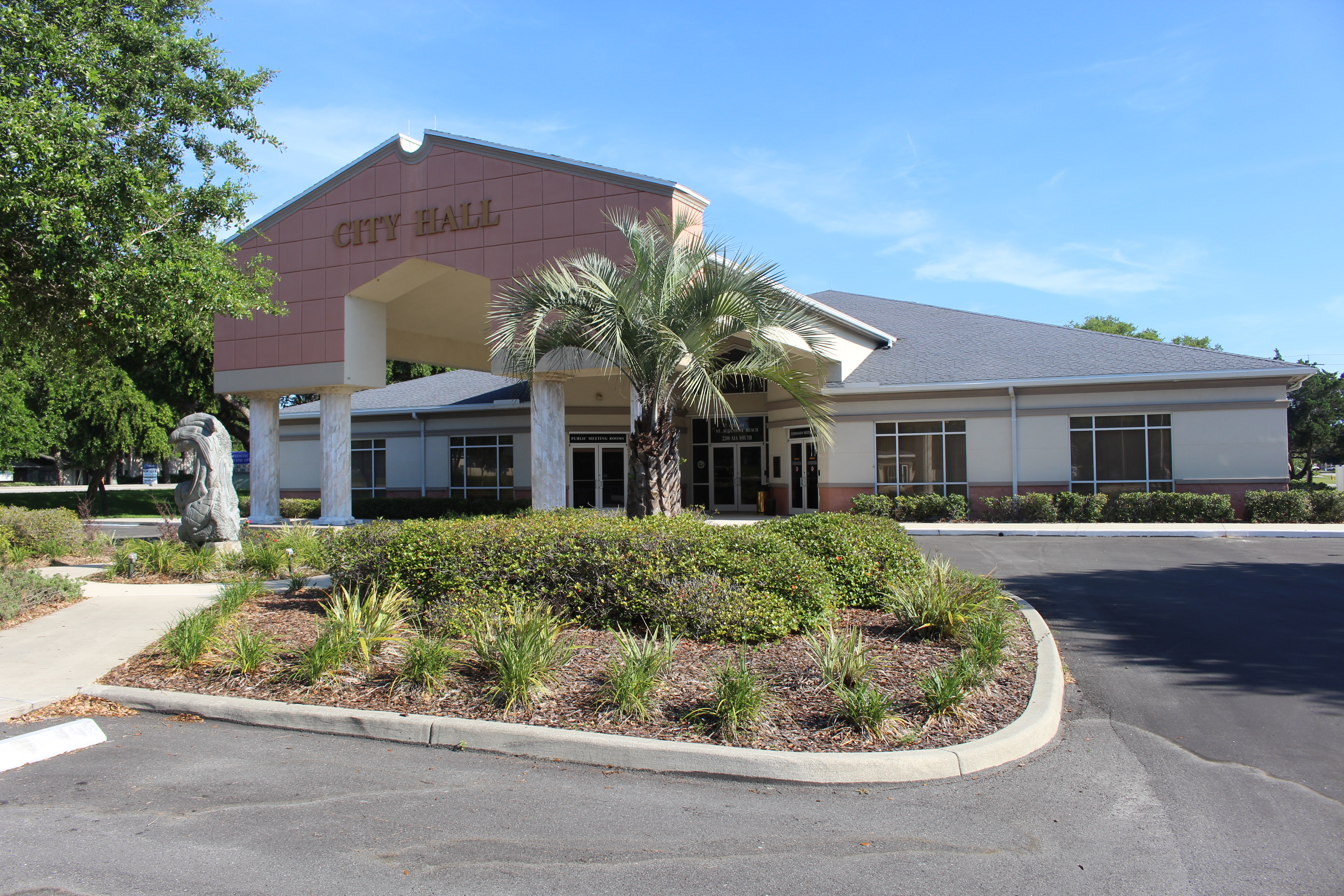
- St. Augustine Beach City Hall

- Seal

- Location in St. Johns County and the state of Florida
- Coordinates: 29°50′29″N 81°16′17″W
- Country: United States
- State: Florida
- County: St. Johns
- Incorporated: 1959

Government
  - Type: Commission–Manager

Area
  - Total: 2.17 sq mi (5.61 km^{2})
  - Land: 2.12 sq mi (5.50 km^{2})
  - Water: 0.042 sq mi (0.11 km^{2})
- Elevation: 10 ft (3.0 m)

Population (2020)
  - Total: 6,803
  - Density: 3,202.8/sq mi (1,236.59/km^{2})
- Time zone: UTC-5 (Eastern (EST))
  - Summer (DST): UTC-4 (EDT)
- ZIP code: 32080
- Area codes: 904, 324
- FIPS code: 12-62525
- GNIS feature ID: 2405390
- Website: http://www.staugbch.com

St. Augustine Beach or Saint Augustine Beach is a city in St. Johns County, Florida, United States. The population was 6,803 at the 2020 US census, up from 6,176 at the 2010 census. It is part of the Jacksonville, Florida metropolitan area.

== Geography ==
According to the United States Census Bureau, the city has a total area of 1.9 square miles (5.0 km^{2}), all land.

The boundaries of St. Augustine Beach are the Atlantic Ocean, the west right-of-way of State Road A1A (SR A1A), the north right-of-way of Pope Road, and Sandpiper Village subdivision to the south.

== Demographics ==
Historical population
Census	Pop.	Note	%±
1960	396		—
1970	632		59.6%
1980	1,289		104.0%
1990	3,657		183.7%
2000	4,683		28.1%
2010	6,176		31.9%
2020	6,803		10.2%
U.S. Decennial Census

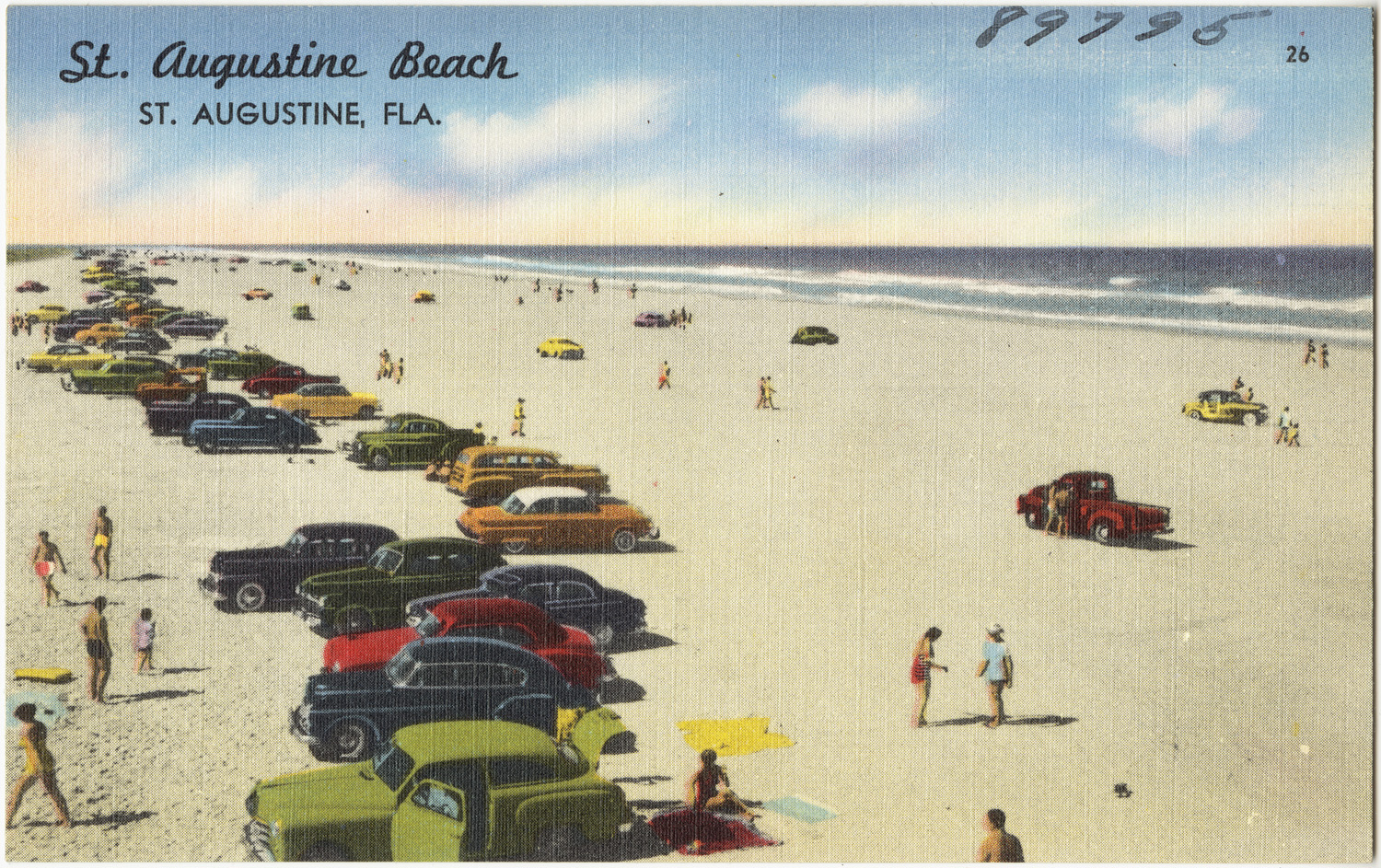
A postcard from St. Augustine Beach in the late 1940s or early 1950s

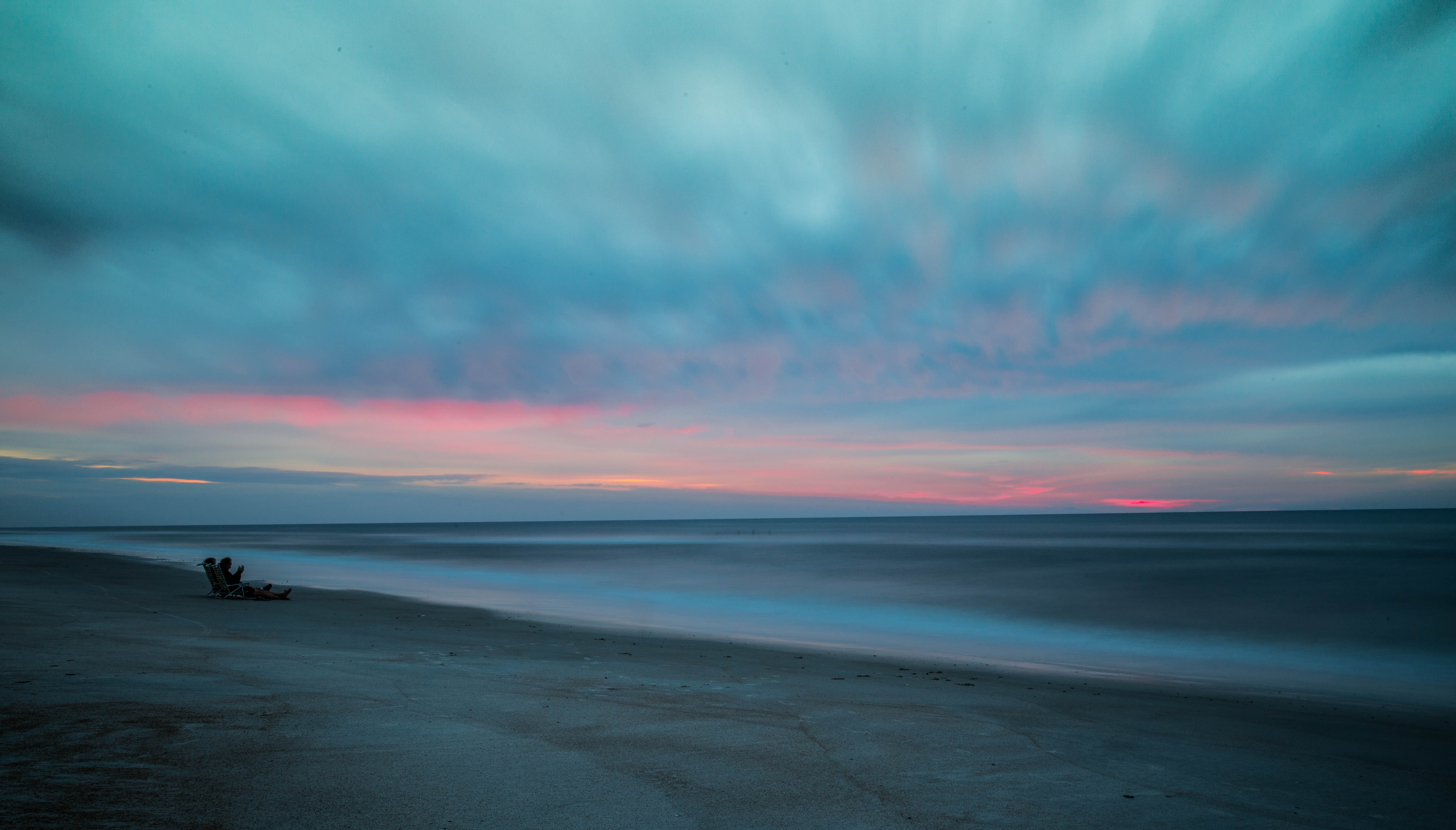
Sunrise at St. Augustine Beach

=== Racial and ethnic composition ===
St. Augustine Beach racial composition (Hispanics excluded from racial categories) (NH = Non-Hispanic)
Race	Pop 2010	Pop 2020	% 2010	% 2020
White (NH)	5,734	6,028	92.84%	88.61%
Black or African American (NH)	43	33	0.70%	0.49%
Native American or Alaska Native (NH)	15	6	0.24%	0.09%
Asian (NH)	72	78	1.17%	1.15%
Pacific Islander or Native Hawaiian (NH)	2	4	0.03%	0.06%
Some other race (NH)	7	47	0.11%	0.69%
Two or more races/Multiracial (NH)	71	233	1.15%	3.42%
Hispanic or Latino (any race)	232	374	3.76%	5.50%
Total	6,176	6,803		

=== 2020 census ===
As of the 2020 census, St. Augustine Beach had a population of 6,803. The median age was 53.4 years. 15.4% of residents were under the age of 18 and 30.3% of residents were 65 years of age or older. For every 100 females there were 93.0 males, and for every 100 females age 18 and over there were 89.6 males age 18 and over.

100.0% of residents lived in urban areas, while 0.0% lived in rural areas.

There were 3,108 households in St. Augustine Beach, of which 20.6% had children under the age of 18 living in them. Of all households, 53.2% were married-couple households, 15.4% were households with a male householder and no spouse or partner present, and 24.8% were households with a female householder and no spouse or partner present. About 26.8% of all households were made up of individuals and 14.5% had someone living alone who was 65 years of age or older.

There were 4,525 housing units, of which 31.3% were vacant. The homeowner vacancy rate was 1.5% and the rental vacancy rate was 37.7%. In 2020, 5.5% of residents were Hispanic or Latino of any race.

The city had 1,762 families in 2020.

=== 2010 census ===
As of the 2010 United States census, there were 6,176 people, 5,494 households, and 2,546 families residing in the city.

=== 2000 census ===
At the 2000 census there were 4,683 people in 2,213 households, including 1,263 families, in the city. The population density was 2,413.1 inhabitants per square mile (931.7/km^{2}). There were 3,140 housing units at an average density of 1,618.0 units per square mile (624.7 units/km^{2}). The racial makeup of the city is 96.80% White, 0.32% African American, 0.41% Native American, 1.15% Asian, 0.02% Pacific Islander, 0.43% from other races, and 0.88% from two or more races. 2.75% of the population are Hispanic or Latino of any race.

Of the 2,213 households in 2000, 18.8% had children under the age of 18 living with them, 46.6% were married couples living together, 7.8% had a female householder with no husband present, and 42.9% were non-families. 28.8% of households were one person and 10.3% were one person aged 65 or older. The average household size was 2.12 and the average family size was 2.57.

In 2000, the age distribution was 15.4% under the age of 18, 11.0% from 18 to 24, 26.2% from 25 to 44, 27.5% from 45 to 64, and 19.9% 65 or older. The median age was 43 years. For every 100 females, there were 95.0 males. For every 100 females age 18 and over, there were 92.8 males.

In 2000, the median household income was $59,484. Males had a median income of $34,883 versus $26,250 for females. The per capita income for the city was $57,905. About 1.4% of families and 2.7% of the population were below the poverty line, including 2.0% of those under age 18 and 3.3% of those age 65 or over.

== Local government ==
=== Commission ===
St. Augustine Beach is organized with a commission-manager form of government; voters elect a City Commission which consists of five members who serve four-year, staggered terms. The five members are elected equally as Commissioners then the Commissioners vote to appoint a member as Mayor and Vice Mayor.

The City Commission meets monthly on the first Monday of the month excluding holidays. The Commission appoints a City Manager, who carries out the will of the commission and handles day-to-day business.

=== Elected officials ===
Position	Name	Term Expiration
Mayor	Dylan Rumrell	2028
Vice Mayor	Beth Sweeny	2028
Commissioner	Undine C. George	2026
Commissioner	Donald Samora	2026
Commissioner	Virginia Morgan	2026
City Manager	Max Royle	Appointed

== Transportation ==
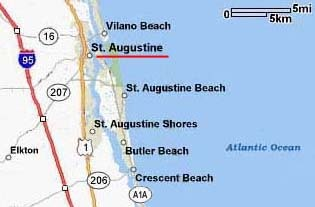
Major roadways, St. Augustine Beach and vicinity

=== Highways ===
- SR A1A runs north–south.
- County Road A1A runs north–south.
- SR 312 runs east–west

=== Buses ===
Bus service is operated by the Sunshine Bus Company. Though based in the city, it also serves neighboring St. Augustine including the historic districts, and the rest of the county. Buses operate mainly between shopping centers across town, but a few go to Hastings and Jacksonville, where one can connect to JTA for additional service across Jacksonville.

== Education ==
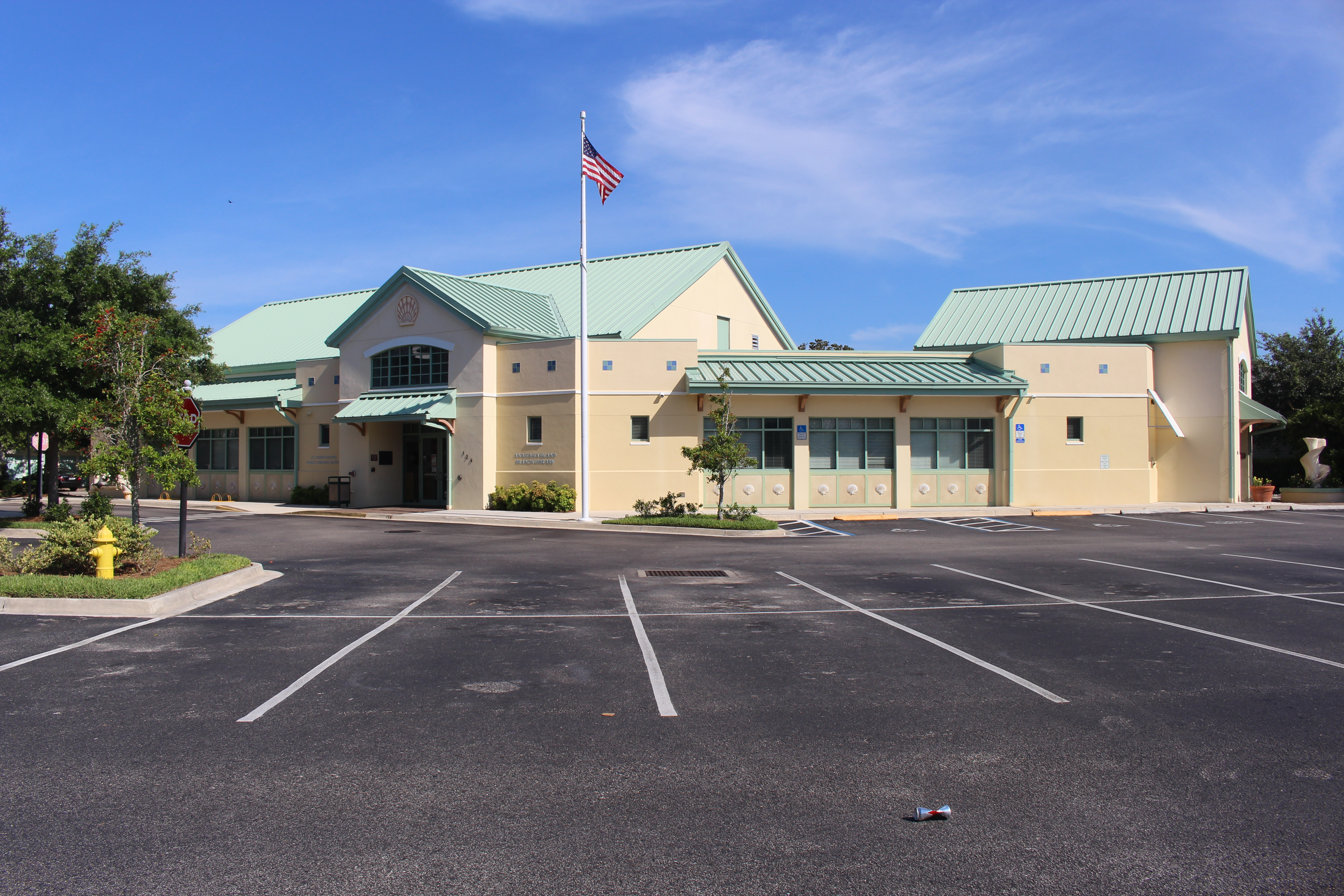
Anastasia Island Branch Library

It is in the St. Johns County School District.

The zoned elementary schools include: R. B. Hunt Elementary School, which serves almost all of the city; and W. D. Hartley Elementary School, which serves a small portion.

The zoned middle schools include: Sebastian Middle School, which serves almost all of the city; and Gamble Rogers Middle School, which serves a small portion.

The zoned high schools include: St. Augustine High School, which serves almost all of the city; and Pedro Menendez High School, which serves a small portion.

St. Johns County Public Library maintains the Anastasia Island Beach Branch.

== Notable person ==
- Mike Waltz, nominee for U.S. Ambassador to the United Nations; former U.S. National Security Advisor and U.S. representative
