= Tony Steward (American football) =

American football player (born 1992)

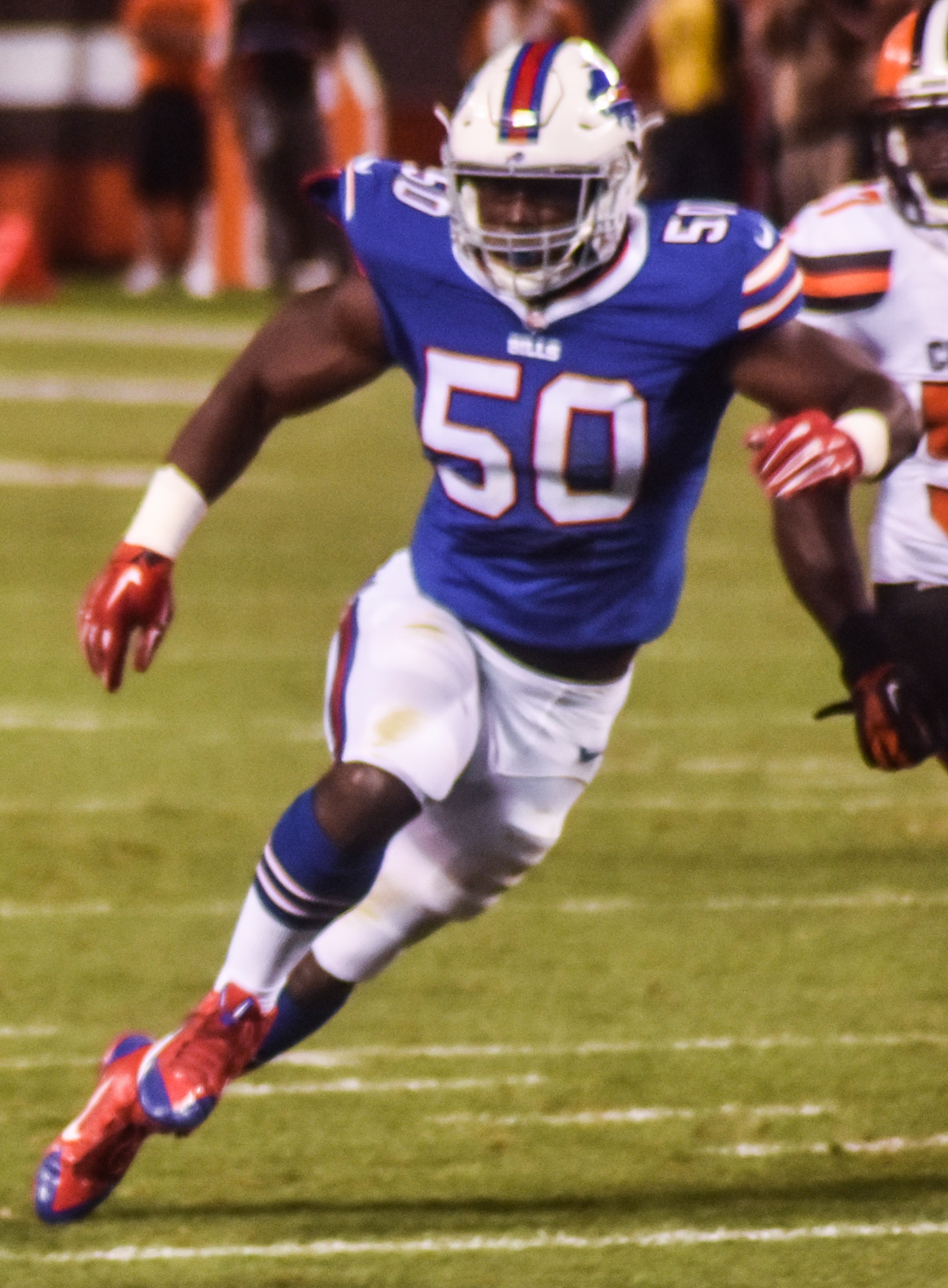
- Steward with the Buffalo Bills in 2015

No. 50
- Position: Linebacker

Personal information
- Born: September 19, 1992 (age 34); Daytona Beach, Florida, U.S.
- Listed height: 6 ft 0 in (1.83 m)
- Listed weight: 241 lb (109 kg)

Career information
- High school: Menendez (St. Augustine, Florida)
- College: Clemson
- NFL draft: 2015: 6th round, 188th overall pick

Career history
- Buffalo Bills (2015); New England Patriots (2016)*; New Orleans Saints (2016)
- * Offseason or practice squad member only

Career NFL statistics
- Total tackles: 2
- Stats at Pro Football Reference

Tony Steward (born September 19, 1992) is an American former professional football player who was a linebacker in the National Football League (NFL). He was selected by the Buffalo Bills in the sixth round of the 2015 NFL draft. He played college football for the Clemson Tigers. Steward was considered one of the best linebacker prospects in his class, and earned the 2010 high school version of the Dick Butkus Award.

== Early life ==
A native of Hastings, Florida, Steward attended Pedro Menendez High School in St. Augustine, Florida, where he was coached by Keith Cromwell. On mediocre 5–6 and 5–7 teams, respectively, in his junior and senior years, Steward was an all-state selection at linebacker. As a senior, he had 81 tackles and five sacks and scored 10 touchdowns on offense. Following his senior year, he received a nomination to the 2010 U.S. Army All-American Bowl.

Regarded as a five-star recruit by Rivals.com, Steward was ranked as the No. 1 outside linebacker prospect in his class. Recruited by virtually every school in the country, he took official visits to UCLA, Clemson University, and Florida State. On National Signing Day 2011, Steward announced his decision to attend Clemson University.

== College career ==
As a true freshman at Clemson University, Steward played a back-up role and had five tackles in 36 snaps over five games. On October 18, 2011, after tearing his ACL a year prior in his senior year of high school. Steward tore his ACL for the second time in his career while at practice and would miss the rest of the 2011 season.

In 2012, Steward returned from injury and was a back-up to senior Jonathan Willard at weakside linebacker, and saw action on special teams. Appearing in all 13 games, Steward had 26 tackles, 16 of which were unassisted.

In 2013, Steward recorded 37 tackles, 3.5 tackles for loss, one sack, one quarterback pressure, one pass breakup and one forced fumble in 167 snaps over 13 games. Steward was again mainly used as a special teams player and back-up linebacker.

In 2014, Steward finally became a starting linebacker. In his senior year he recorded 73 tackles, 10 tackles for loss, 3.5 sacks, a team-high 13 quarterback pressures and one pass breakup in 495 snaps over 12 games (12 starts). In a game against South Carolina he was named co-defensive player-of-the-game after recording seven tackles, two tackles for loss, one sack and two quarterback pressures.

== Professional career ==
=== Buffalo Bills ===
Steward was selected by the Buffalo Bills in the sixth round (188th overall) of the 2015 NFL draft. On May 18, 2015, Steward signed a four-year contract with the Bills. On December 10, 2015, the Bills placed Steward on injured reserve. Steward was released on April 19, 2016.

=== New England Patriots ===
On April 22, 2016, Steward signed with the New England Patriots. On May 11, 2016, the Patriots waived Steward.

=== New Orleans Saints ===
On May 16, 2016, Steward was signed by the New Orleans Saints. On August 30, 2016, he was placed on injured reserve.

== Personal life ==
Steward was born in Hastings, Florida. He became engaged to his college sweetheart, Brittany Burns, in December 2015. However, Burns died of ovarian cancer in February 2016.
