= St. Augustine High School (Florida) =

Public high school in Florida, United States

Coordinates: 29.9238571°N 81.3420188°W

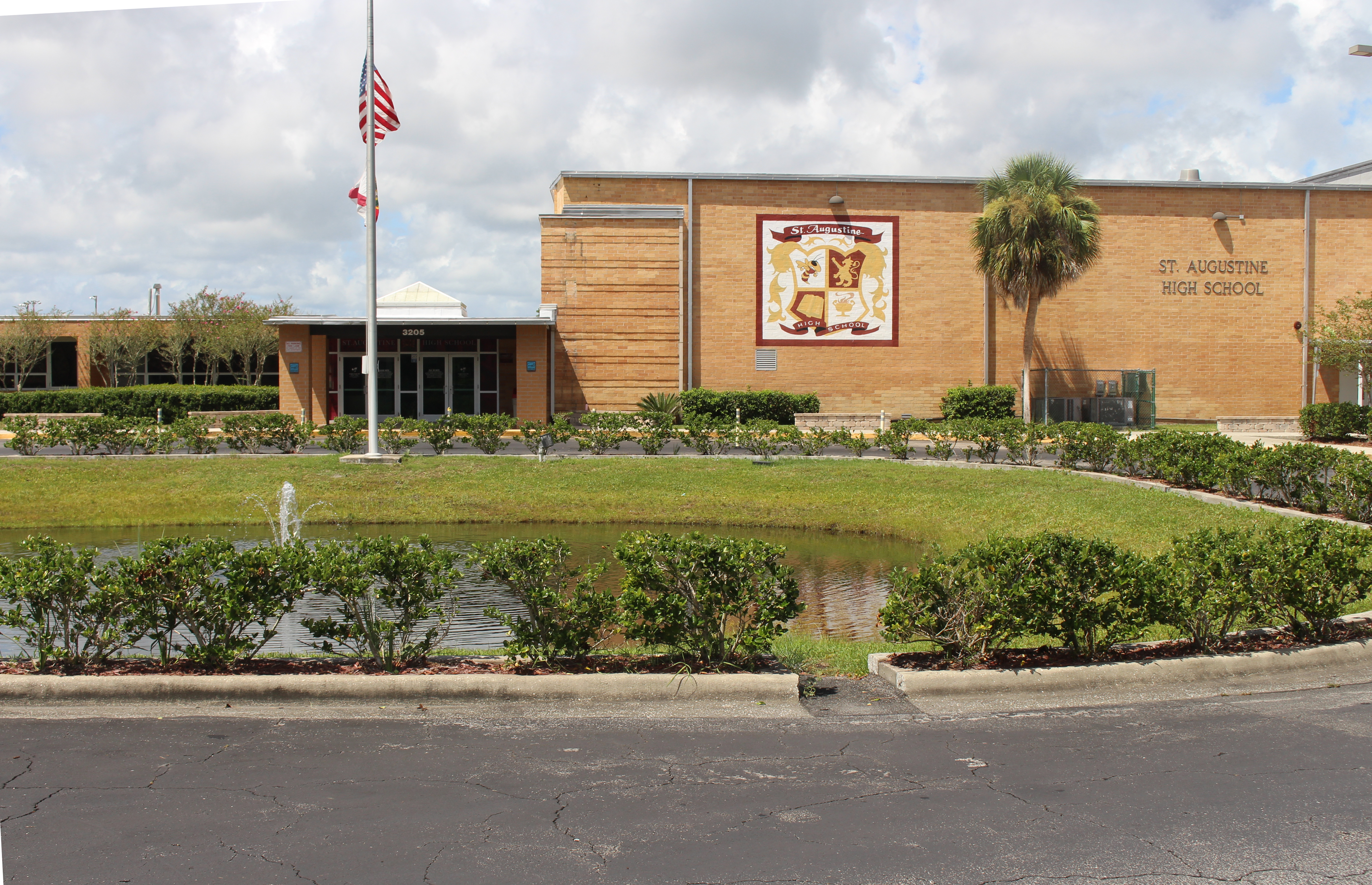

Location
- 3205 Varella Avenue; St. Augustine postal address, Florida 32084; United States

Information
- Type: Public School
- Motto: Once a Jacket, Always a Jacket!
- Status: Open
- School district: St. Johns County School District
- Superintendent: Brennan Asplen
- Principal: Travis Brown
- Staff: 84.30 (FTE)
- Grades: 9–12
- Enrollment: 1,650 (2026-2027)
- Student to teacher ratio: 20.11
- Hours in school day: 9:20 a.m. - 3:55 p.m.
- Colors: Maroon █, Gold █
- Nickname: Yellow Jackets
- Rivals: Pedro Menendez High School
- Website: https://www-sahs.stjohns.k12.fl.us/

St. Augustine High School is a public high school in the St. Johns County School District, located in unincorporated St. Johns County, Florida, with a St. Augustine postal address. The school is not in the St. Augustine City limits. It teaches grades 8 through 12, with student enrollment in grades 9-12 numbering 1,713, and it is ranked 292nd within Florida.

In addition to St. Augustine, its attendance boundary includes: Vilano Beach, and the majority of St. Augustine Beach.

In 2026, St. Johns Technical High School was combined with St. Augustine High School, and an Early Career Program was created. This was due to the school district budget being $15 million short.

== Academic programs ==
SAHS offers several Career Academies and Programs of Interest:

- Academy of Advanced Automation and Technology
- Academy of Aviation and Aerospace
- Academy of Future Teachers
- Academy of Law and Homeland Security
- St. Johns County Center for the Arts
- Yellow Jacket Battalion Army JROTC
- Cambridge AICE Program.

St. Augustine High School Academy of Aviation and Aerospace is affiliated with Embry–Riddle Aeronautical University.

== Football ==
The St. Augustine High School football program has competed in the FHSAA football state playoffs 25 times, making their first appearance in 1972 under coach Herman "Foots" Brumley. Brumley's teams made six playoff appearances from 1972 to 1979, including five consecutive appearances from 1975 to 1979, winning the district championship in all five seasons. The Yellow Jackets had a playoff record of 4–6 under Brumley before his retirement after the 1980 season. The Yellow Jackets saw little success in the period from Brumley's retirement until the late 1990s, with head coach Charles Lopez leading the Yellow Jackets to a lone playoff game in the 1993 season.

In 1996, Joey Wiles was introduced as the new head football coach for St. Augustine. Wiles would head the program for the next 20 seasons and would establish himself as one of the top five winningest coaches in the state. In the 1999 season, the Yellow Jackets returned to the playoffs, marking the start of an 22-season playoff appearance streak which ended in 2021. Two seasons later, only in Wiles's sixth season at the helm, St. Augustine made their first appearance in a state championship game, which they lost 6–38 to Rockledge High School. The Yellow Jackets would finally break through in 2005, going 15–0 and defeating Booker High School 31–15 to claim their first state championship. The Yellow Jackets would return to the championship game two seasons later, but lost to Naples 10–17. Since Wiles took over the program in 1996 until his resignation after the 2015 season, the Yellow Jackets went 198–43, including 59–3 against St. Johns County schools, made 17 consecutive playoff appearances, won 14 district titles, – including 11 straight from 2004 to 2014 – achieved 7 undefeated regular seasons, won 50 consecutive district games from 2003 to 2015 – a streak which ranked fourth in state history at the time – and appeared in three state championship games, winning one of them.

Brian Braddock was hired following Wiles's departure after the 2015 season to take the job of Assistant Athletic Director at Flagler College. In his first season leading the team, the Yellow Jackets reclaimed the district title and reached the region finals of the playoffs, St. Augustine's best playoff result since 2010.

The Yellow Jackets play at Joey Wiles–Walt Slater Field at H. L. "Foots" Brumley Stadium.

== Notable alumni ==
- Ronald L. Bailey, Lieutenant General, United States Marine Corps
- Brandon James, former Indianapolis Colts and Edmonton Eskimos football player
- Scott Player, former NFL punter
- Austin Reed, college football quarterback for the Western Kentucky Hilltoppers
- Steven L. Sears, television writer/producer
- Caleb Sturgis, former NFL kicker
