= Tocoi, Florida =

Former settlement in Florida

Coordinates: 29°50′42″N 81°33′28″W

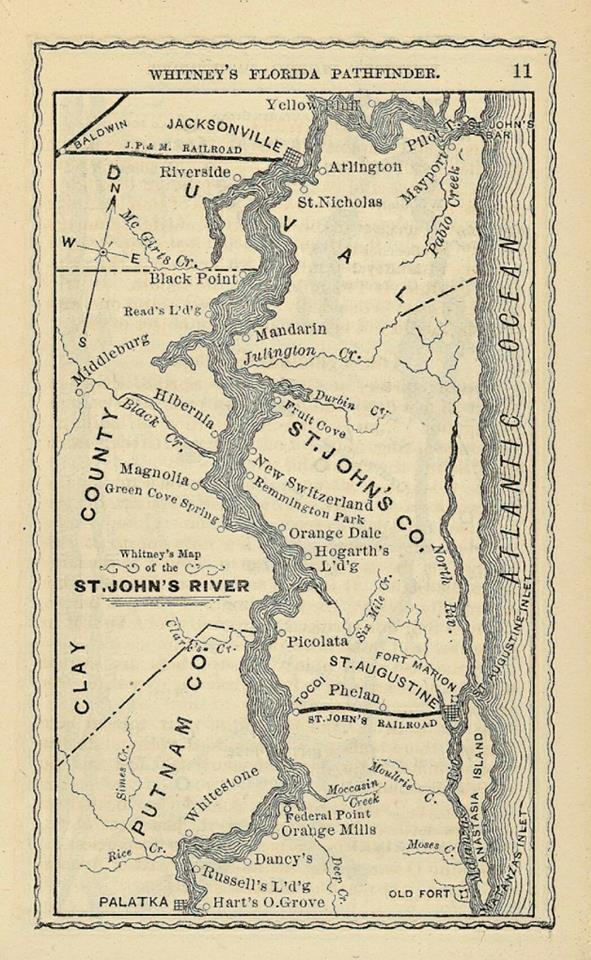
1876 map showing Picolata and Tocoi along the St. johns River west.of St. Augustine

Tocoi is a former settlement along the St. Johns River in St. Johns County, Florida.

Tocoi was the site of a ferry landing and a local rail line to St. Augustine, Florida. The name is said to come from a Timucuan word for water lily. The nearby Tocoi Creek is a tributary of the St. Johns River. A commercial Spanish moss factory was located in the area.

Elizabeth Stuart Phelps Ward's 1879 book Sealed Orders features Tocoi and its train station as a setting.

Harriet Beecher Stowe, a 19th-century American author famed for her abolitionist writings, described her arrival by steamship at Tocoi and the train journey to Saint Augustine in her book, Palmetto Leaves (1873).
