= Renaissance Resort at World Golf Village =

Golf resort in Florida, USA

Renaissance Resort
- Interactive map of Renaissance Resort
- 29.99°N 81.46°W

Club information
- Location: St. Augustine, Florida, U.S.
- Type: Private
- Operator: Renaissance Hotels
- Website: worldgolfrenaissance.com

King & Bear
- Designed by: Arnold Palmer & Jack Nicklaus
- Par: 72
- Length: 7,247
- Course rating: 75.2/141

Slammer & Squire
- Designed by: Bobby Weed
- Par: 72
- Length: 6,939
- Course rating: 73.8/135

The Renaissance Resort at World Golf Village is a golf resort located in St. Augustine, Florida. It is part of Renaissance Hotels brand which is managed by Marriott.

Situated within the World Golf Village, the resort is home to a hotel, restaurants, spa, two golf courses, the World Golf Hall of Fame, PGA Tour Golf Academy, and an IMAX theater.

== History ==
The 301-room hotel at 500 South Legacy Trail opened as World Golf Village Resort Hotel alongside the now defunct World Golf Village project. In 1999, it was converted to a Marriott Renaissance hotel by John Q. Hammons Hotels, Inc. It underwent a $10 million renovation in 2008 that included a fresh look for all the guest rooms and public spaces. It was sold July 3, 2025 for $24.25 million to SUN Development & Management Corp., through St. Augustine Lodging Associates LLC of Indianapolis.

== Golf ==
There are two golf courses within the resort, the King & Bear, which is the only course to have been co-designed by Arnold Palmer and Jack Nicklaus, and the Slammer & Squire, designed by Bobby Weed with consultation from Sam Snead and Gene Sarazen.
