= St. Augustine South, Florida =

- CDP
- Location in St. Johns County and the state of Florida
- Coordinates: 29°50′41″N 81°18′56″W
- Country: United States
- State: Florida
- County: St. Johns

Area
  - Total: 1.59 sq mi (4.11 km^{2})
  - Land: 1.59 sq mi (4.11 km^{2})
  - Water: 0 sq mi (0.00 km^{2})
- Elevation: 23 ft (7.0 m)

Population (2020)
  - Total: 5,066
  - Density: 3,195.5/sq mi (1,233.78/km^{2})
- Time zone: UTC-5 (Eastern (EST))
  - Summer (DST): UTC-4 (EDT)
- FIPS code: 12-62562
- GNIS ID: 2403503

St. Augustine South is a census-designated place (CDP) in St. Johns County, Florida, United States. The population was 5,066 at the 2020 census, up from 4,998 at the 2010 census. It is part of the Jacksonville, Florida Metropolitan Statistical Area.

== Geography ==
According to the United States Census Bureau, the CDP has a total area of 1.7 square miles (4.5 km^{2}), all land.

== Demographics ==
Historical population
Census	Pop.	Note	%±
1990	4,218		—
2000	5,035		19.4%
2010	4,998		−0.7%
2020	5,066		1.4%
U.S. Decennial Census

=== 2020 census ===
As of the 2020 census, St. Augustine South had a population of 5,066. The median age was 49.4 years. 16.6% of residents were under the age of 18 and 25.3% of residents were 65 years of age or older. For every 100 females there were 95.7 males, and for every 100 females age 18 and over there were 93.3 males age 18 and over.

100.0% of residents lived in urban areas, while 0.0% lived in rural areas.

There were 2,148 households in St. Augustine South, of which 22.0% had children under the age of 18 living in them. Of all households, 51.1% were married-couple households, 16.4% were households with a male householder and no spouse or partner present, and 25.3% were households with a female householder and no spouse or partner present. About 26.3% of all households were made up of individuals and 14.2% had someone living alone who was 65 years of age or older.

There were 2,267 housing units, of which 5.2% were vacant. The homeowner vacancy rate was 1.3% and the rental vacancy rate was 7.9%.

Racial composition as of the 2020 census
Race	Number	Percent
White	4,439	87.6%
Black or African American	43	0.8%
American Indian and Alaska Native	11	0.2%
Asian	41	0.8%
Native Hawaiian and Other Pacific Islander	2	0.0%
Some other race	73	1.4%
Two or more races	457	9.0%
Hispanic or Latino (of any race)	335	6.6%

=== 2000 census ===
At the 2000 census there were 5,035 people, 1,929 households, and 1,462 families in the CDP. The population density was 2,927.3 inhabitants per square mile (1,130.2/km^{2}). There were 1,993 housing units at an average density of 1,158.7 per square mile (447.4/km^{2}). The racial makeup of the CDP was 96.80% White, 0.95% African American, 0.26% Native American, 1.11% Asian, 0.02% Pacific Islander, 0.14% from other races, and 0.71% from two or more races. Hispanic or Latino of any race were 2.82%. Of the 1,929 households 31.9% had children under the age of 18 living with them, 63.6% were married couples living together, 8.8% had a female householder with no husband present, and 24.2% were non-families. 18.2% of households were one person and 8.4% were one person aged 65 or older. The average household size was 2.60 and the average family size was 2.95.

The age distribution was 24.0% under the age of 18, 6.3% from 18 to 24, 27.7% from 25 to 44, 26.3% from 45 to 64, and 15.7% 65 or older. The median age was 41 years. For every 100 females, there were 91.7 males. For every 100 females age 18 and over, there were 89.2 males.

The median household income was $52,090 and the median family income was $56,592. Males had a median income of $36,123 versus $25,434 for females. The per capita income for the CDP was $21,883. About 2.3% of families and 4.1% of the population were below the poverty line, including 3.4% of those under age 18 and 2.9% of those age 65 or over.

== Education ==
It is in the St. Johns County School District.

Zoned schools include Osceola Elementary School, R. J. Murray Middle School, and Pedro Menendez High School.
