= World Golf Village =

- Interactive map of World Golf Village

Club information
- Location: St. Johns County, near Jacksonville, Florida
- Established: 1998
- Type: Private
- Operator: Honours Golf
- Tournaments: Liberty Mutual Legends of Golf; Shell's Wonderful World of Golf
- Website: worldgolfvillage.com/

King & Bear
- Designed by: Arnold Palmer; Jack Nicklaus; Bobby Weed
- Par: 72
- Length: 7,279
- Course rating: 75.2
- Slope rating: 141
- Course record: 64

Slammer & Squire
- Designed by: Sam Snead; Gene Sarazen; Bobby Weed
- Par: 72
- Length: 6,939
- Course rating: 73.8
- Slope rating: 135
- Course record: 64

World Golf Village (WGV) is a census-designated place and golf resort in St. Johns County, Florida, United States, located between Jacksonville and St. Augustine. It was created by the PGA Tour and previously showcased the World Golf Hall of Fame. In addition to the resort the World Golf Village features residential and commercial developments.

== Development ==
The 6,300-acre (2,500 ha) parcel was approved in the 1990s as a "Development of Regional Impact" (DRI) under Section 380.06 of the Florida Statutes, and eventually have 18,000 residents. A new interchange on Interstate 95 in Florida was constructed to permit direct access to the site, which was expected to host a million visitors each year.

Kelly Lake was created at the center of the village, surrounded by a 1.2-mile (1.9 km) brick Walk of Champions, which features a large flagstone for each Hall of Fame member, with their name and signature etched in granite. A large building on the west side houses the hall of fame, theater, cafe and 110-foot shrine tower. The "Shops of World Golf Village" are situated on the north and east sides, and the Renaissance Hotel and convention center are to the south.

== World Golf Foundation ==
The Ladies Professional Golf Association created a hall of fame in 1951. It was inactive until 1967, when it moved into a physical location in Augusta, Georgia and was renamed the LPGA Tour Hall of Fame. In the early 1990s, the PGA Tour was contemplating a Hall of Fame close to their north Florida headquarters. Deane Beman asked LPGA commissioner Charlie Mechem if there was interest in a joint Golf Hall of Fame. When they responded in the affirmative, the United States Golf Association was contacted, as was The Royal and Ancient Golf Club of St Andrews. Both agreed to collaborate, and PGA of America closed the Pinehurst World Golf Hall of Fame, while the LPGA decided to merge their HOF into the new facility.

An independent entity, the World Golf Foundation (WGF), was formed in 1994 to promote and honor the game and those who made significant contributions. The Board of Directors included representatives from the world's major golf organizations. The WGF owns and controls the World Golf Hall of Fame.

== Hall of Fame ==
The foremost attraction at World Golf Village was the World Golf Hall of Fame, which superseded the PGA of America facility at Pinehurst, North Carolina in May 1998. The Hall of Fame had a permanent display with biographical information for every individual inducted. There were also sections devoted to the history of golf, heritage, organizations, course design, equipment, attire and trends. The Trophy Tower contained a collection of all the major tournament trophies (and many of the minor ones). Many of the displays were interactive and gave the visitor a "hands on" experience. Featured exhibits changed yearly, and a round on the 18-hole putting course was included with museum admission. Additionally, there was a Challenge Hole with an island green similar to the signature hole at TPC Sawgrass, the par 3, 17th.

The WGV campus of the World Golf Hall of Fame was closed in 2023 and relocated back to Pinehurst. As of September 2025, St. Johns County is soliciting and evaluating multiple re-development proposals for the vacant site.

== Golf ==
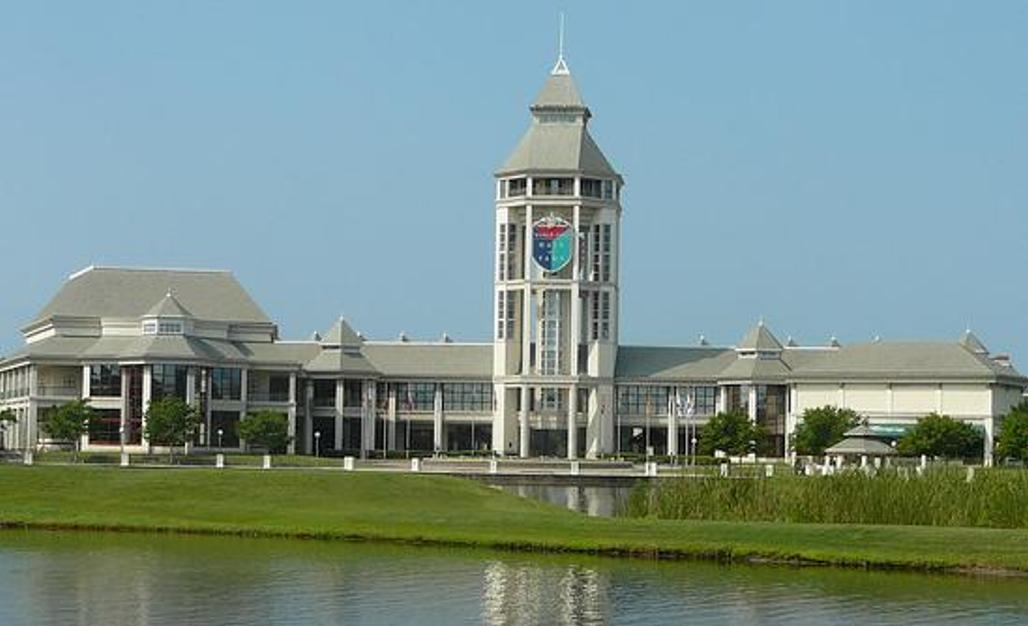
Hall of Fame building at World Golf Village

=== Courses ===
The resort features two championship golf courses: the King & Bear, designed jointly by Arnold Palmer and Jack Nicklaus, and the Slammer & Squire, a collaboration of Sam Snead and Gene Sarazen. Both courses consistently receive 4.5 stars rating (out of 5) by Golf Digest. Both courses have hosted professional tournaments including the Liberty Mutual Legends of Golf, a Champions Tour event, and Shell's Wonderful World of Golf, as well as other nationally televised events.

=== Academy ===
The PGA TOUR Golf Academy opened at WGV in 2000 as a one-stop facility to help players improve all facets of their golf game. Their instructors are experienced PGA and LPGA professionals who provide clinics, schools, private lessons, development programs and camps for juniors using the latest technology.

Based on the success of the program, branches have been established at TPC Sawgrass, TPC Scottsdale, TPC Las Vegas, TPC San Antonio and six other resort locations in the United States. The academy at World Golf Village trains and certifies all instructors at TOUR academies.

== Accommodations ==
Four hotels/motels were constructed in anticipation of tourism at the center. The largest is the Renaissance Resort at World Golf Village, followed by the Laterra Resort & Spa. The Grande Villas and The Residences at World Golf Village also provide unique accommodations.

== Attractions ==
One of the most popular attractions was the IMAX Theater, which played movies and documentaries in a 300-seat theater with an 80-foot (24 m)-wide by six-story-high screen. The theater was closed in 2024.

The Murray Brothers Caddyshack restaurant was located along the Walk of Champions and was owned by actor Bill Murray and his five brothers. Their slogan is "Eat, Drink and Be Murray!". The restaurant's last day in business was June 27, 2026. This long-time staple was yet another loss to the World Golf Village.

Villagio Bar and Grill and a Starbucks are located within the Renaissance Resort. The Fairways Café was part of the World Golf Hall of Fame and offered casual and takeout fare. The 31,000 sq ft (2,900 m^{2}) PGA Tour Stop (now closed) was situated along the Walk of Champions, and was the largest golf store in Florida. Also along the Walk of Champions was an 18-hole miniature golf course, which is now closed.

Historic St. Augustine and the beaches of the Atlantic Ocean are nearby, and WGV is part of the Greater Jacksonville Metropolitan Area, with over 1 million residents.

== Demographics ==
World Golf Village
- Census-designated place
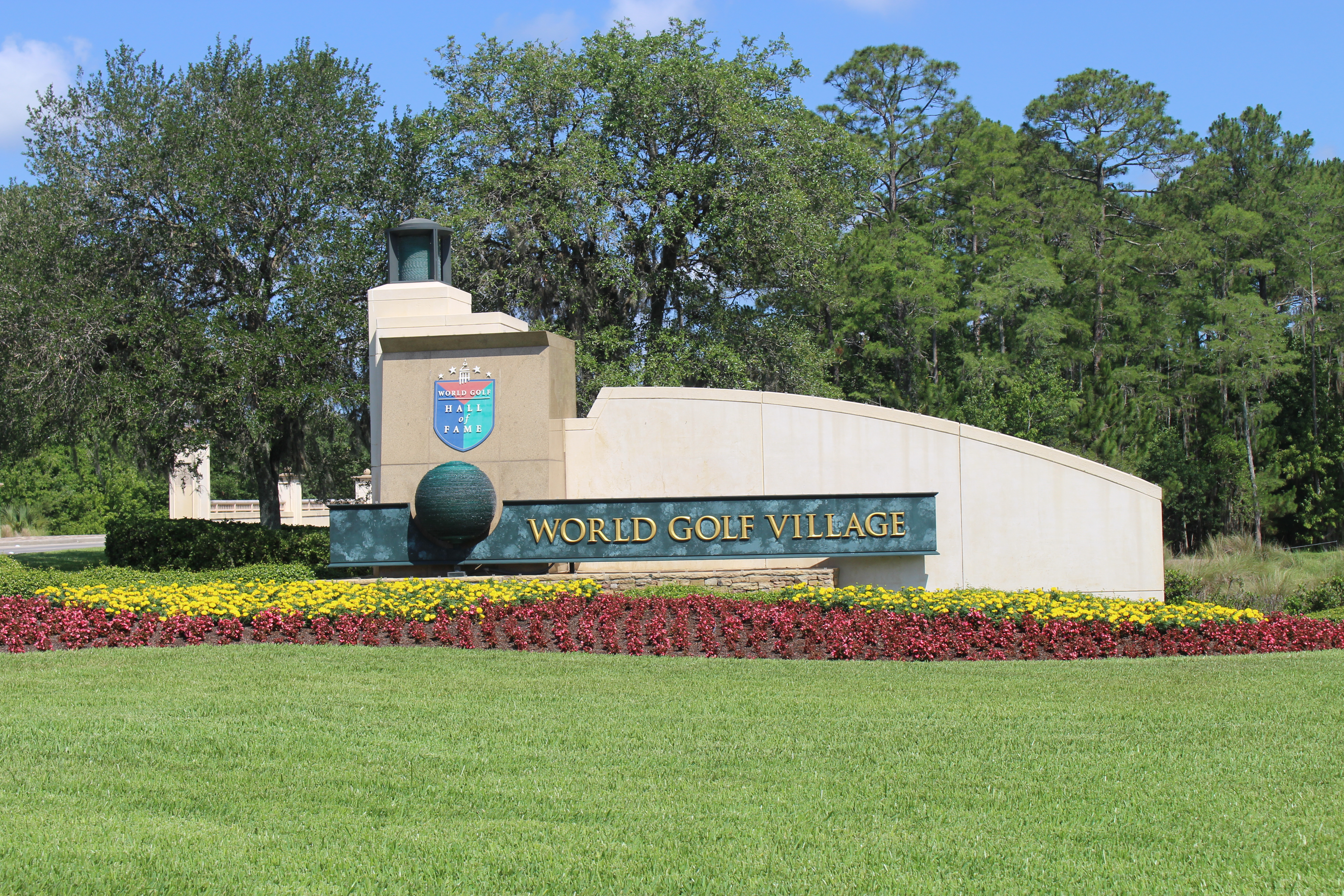
- Entrance sign
- Interactive map of World Golf Village
- Coordinates: 29°59′31″N 81°29′20″W
- Country: United States
- State: Florida
- County: St. Johns

Area
  - Total: 27.24 sq mi (70.55 km^{2})
  - Land: 26.86 sq mi (69.57 km^{2})
- Elevation: 26 ft (7.9 m)

Population (2020)
  - Total: 22,117
  - Density: 823.4/sq mi (317.91/km^{2})
- Time zone: UTC-5 (Eastern (EST))
  - Summer (DST): UTC-4 (EDT)
- ZIP code: 32092
- Area code: 904
- GNIS feature ID: 2583391

World Golf Village first appeared as a census designated place in the 2010 U.S. census.

The World Golf Village CDP had a population of 22,117 at the 2020 census, up from 12,310 at the 2010 census. It was defined as a CDP in advance of the 2010 census. It is part of the Jacksonville metropolitan area.

As of the 2020 United States census, there were 22,117 people, 7,717 households, and 6,704 families residing in the World Golf Village CDP. 2,398 households had children under the age of 18. 4.8% of the population were under 5 years old, 23.2% under 18 years old, and 19.5% were 65 years and over. The median age for the CDP was 41.4 years old. 49.9% of the population were female.

The racial makeup of the city is 84.9% White, 8.3% African American, 0.0% Native American, 4.2% Asian, 0.1% Pacific Islander, 7.5% from other races, and 4.9% from two or more races. 13.5% of the population are Hispanic or Latino of any race.

The median household income was $103,019. 6.6% of the population lived below the poverty threshold, including 7.3% of those under 18 and 2.1% of those over 65. 93.3% of the population 25 years and older had a high school degree or equivalent or higher and 48.7% of that same population had a bachelor's degree or higher. 9.0% of the population were veterans.

== Education ==
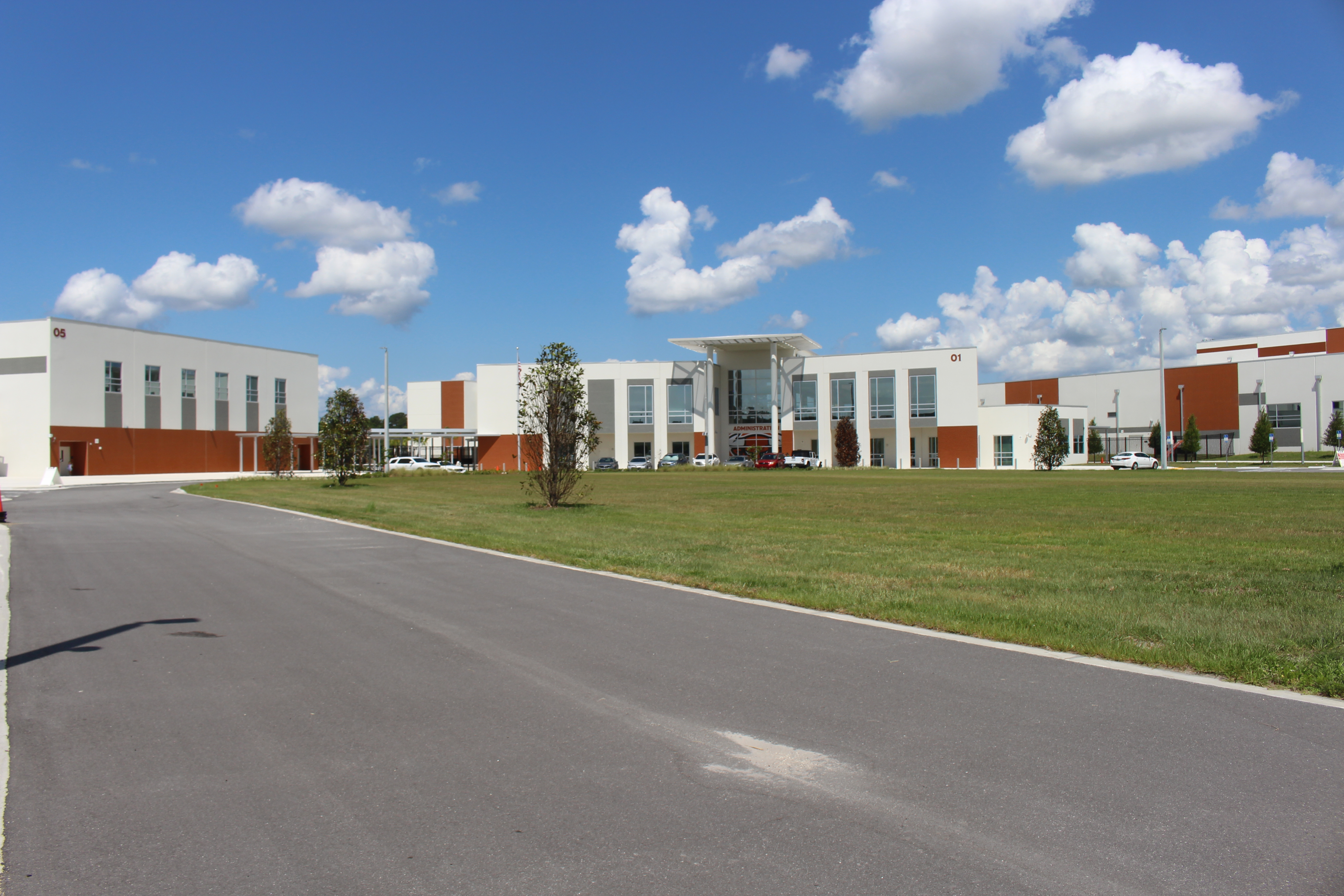
Tocoi Creek High School, in the World Golf Village CDP

The community is within the St. Johns County School District.

Zoned elementary schools include: Mill Creek Academy, Picolata Crossing, and Wards Creek.

Boundaries of two middle schools include portions of World Golf Village: Mill Creek and Pacetti Bay Middle School:

All residents are zoned to Tocoi Creek High School.

== Other development ==
The 40,000 sq ft (3,700 m^{2}) St. Johns County Convention Center was constructed within the WGV and is connected to the Renaissance Resort. Westminster St. Augustine, a Life Plan Community, is also located in WGV and offers Independent, Assisted, Skilled and Memory Care - all within the same gated campus. A "Blue/Green" timeshare resort with sales office is also within WGV. Individual subdivisions exist within WGV which offer homes/homesites for those looking for an active Florida lifestyle within a golfing resort. World Golf Village hosts a Bucee’s travel stop, one of only 2 in Florida.The other is near Daytona Beach.
