= Disease Vector Education Center =

Disease vector museum in St. Augustine, Florida

- Established: March 26, 2024
- Location: 120 EOC Dr. St. Augustine, Florida 32092
- Coordinates: 29°54′9″N 81°24′48″W
- Website: diseasevectoreducationcenter.org

The Disease Vector Education Center is located in St. Augustine, Florida. It is commonly called the Mosquito Museum by locals and is the first museum of its kind in the United States.

It features an insect themed playground, a simulated helicopter, and resources to learn about malaria, dengue fever, West Nile virus, yellow fever, Zika virus, chikungunya, and lymphatic filariasis.

The education center opened in 2024 and is operated by the Anastasia Mosquito Control District, which is a special district funded by the taxpayers of St. Johns County, Florida. It cost $4.5 million to build and is 6,000 square feet. The University of Florida and Florida Department of Agriculture and Consumer Services contributed resources to the center.
