= Pescetti =

Pescetti, Pescetta, Pescetto (also anglicized 'Peschetti' etc.) is an Italian family name and may refer to:

== Pescetti ==
- Giovanni Battista Pescetti, 18th-century Venetian organist and composer
- Luis Pescetti (born 1958), Argentinian novelist, essayist, musician and actor

== Pescetto ==
- Federico Giovanni Battista Pescetto (1817–1883), Italian Scottish Rite Freemason and twofold Minister in the Rattazzi II Cabinet
- Jeff Pescetto (born 1954), American musical artist
- Maggie Pescetto (born 2000), Italian Formula Kite sailor
- Paolo Pescetto (born 1995), Italian rugby union player
