= Paul Rogers (politician) =

American politician (1921–2008)

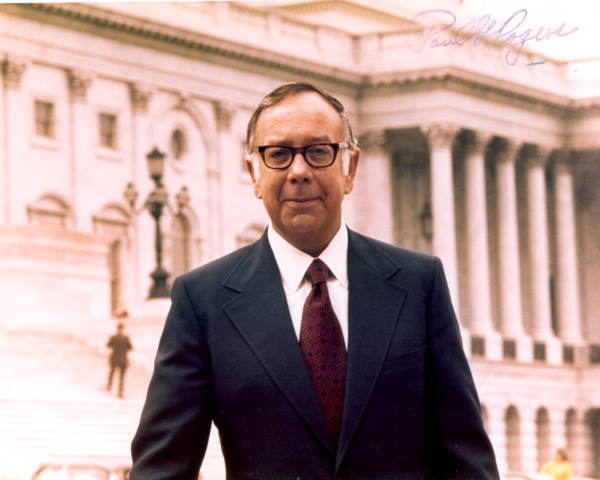

Member of the U.S. House of Representatives from Florida
- In office January 11, 1955 – January 3, 1979
- Preceded by: Dwight L. Rogers
- Succeeded by: Daniel A. Mica
- Constituency: 6th district (1955–1967); 9th district (1967–1973); 11th district (1973–1979)

Personal details
- Born: June 4, 1921 Ocilla, Georgia, U.S.
- Died: October 13, 2008 (aged 87) Washington D.C., U.S.
- Party: Democratic
- Spouse: Rebecca Bell
- Children: 1
- Parent(s): Dwight L. Rogers Sr. Florence Roberts
- Education: University of Florida College of Law

Paul Grant Rogers (June 4, 1921 – October 13, 2008) was an American lawyer and politician who served as a Democratic member of the U.S. House of Representatives from Florida from 1955 to 1979, succeeding his father, Dwight L. Rogers. He was chairman of Research America from 1996 to 2005.

During his tenure in Congress, Rogers supported racial segregation in the United States.

== Biography ==
=== Early life and education ===
Rogers was born in Ocilla, Georgia, on June 4, 1921, the middle of three sons, to Dwight Laing Rogers Sr., an attorney and U.S. congressman, and Florence Rogers (née Roberts). His brothers were Dwight L. Rogers Jr. (1917-2007) and Doyle Rogers (1928-2016), who were both attorneys in Palm Beach, Florida.

He attended the University of Florida, where he was President of Florida Blue Key and graduated with a Bachelor of Arts degree in 1942. After graduating he joined the U.S. Army, serving in World War II from 1942 to 1946 during which he rose to the rank of Major and received a Bronze Star Medal. Rogers attended George Washington University Law School but did not graduate there, receiving his law degree instead at the University of Florida College of Law in 1948. Rogers worked as a lawyer in private practice and was a member of the board of directors for Merck & Co. and Mutual Life Insurance Co. of New York.

=== Political career ===
He was elected as a Democrat to the 84th Congress in a special election to fill the vacancy caused by the death of his father, Dwight L. Rogers. Rogers served for and was reelected to the eleven succeeding congresses, for 24 years from January 11, 1955, to January 3, 1979. He chose not to run for reelection to the 96th Congress. While a member of the House, Rogers served as chair of the Subcommittee on Health and the Environment from 1971 to 1979. Nicknamed "Mr. Health," he was a key representative behind the adoption of the National Cancer Act of 1971, the Medical Device Amendments of 1976, the Health Maintenance Organization Act, the Emergency Medical Service Act, the Medicare-Medicaid Anti-Fraud and Abuse Amendments of 1977 and the Clean Air Act of 1970.

He was a signatory to the 1956 Southern Manifesto that opposed the desegregation of public schools ordered by the Supreme Court in Brown v. Board of Education. Rogers voted against the Civil Rights Acts of 1957, 1960, 1964, and 1968, but voted in favor of the Voting Rights Act of 1965.

== Later career ==
Rogers was a resident of West Palm Beach, Florida, and a partner in the Washington, D.C., office of Hogan & Hartson. He was also active in the National Osteoporosis Foundation, Friends of the National Library of Medicine, and the National Leadership Coalition on Health Care (now the National Coalition on Health Care).

Mark Foley has said that a meeting with Rogers when Foley was three years old inspired him to go into politics. After suffering from lung cancer and undergoing an operation, Rogers died of the disease in Washington, D.C., on October 13, 2008, at a rehabilitation hospital.

== Personal life ==
In 1962, Rogers married Rebecca Bell (born 1931), daughter of Joseph Vernon Bell and Clara Elinor "Nell" Ballard, of Andalusia, Alabama. They had one daughter;

- Rebecca "Laing" Rogers (born 1963), who married John Michael Sisto, Jr. (born 1957), of Watchung, New Jersey and Hillsboro Beach, Florida. They have three daughters, Alexandra Sisto Daniel (born 1990), Lilly Rogers Sisto (born 1995) and Rebecca Rogers Sisto (born 1998) and a son, Cole Sisto (born 1992).

Rogers died October 13, 2008 aged 87 in Washington, D.C.

== Awards and honors ==
- Public Welfare Medal from the National Academy of Sciences (1982).
- National Health Lawyers Association Health Policy Award (1991)
- Albert Lasker Public Service Award (1993)
- American Pharmaceutical Association Hugo H, Schaefer Award (1994)
- AlliedSignal Achievement Award in Aging (1994)
- Distinguished Leadership Award from the University of Florida Health Sciences Center (1994)
- National Osteoporosis Foundation Leadership Award (1995)
- Maxwell Finland Award for Scientific Achievement (1996)
- National Cancer Institute "Year 2000" Award
- Edwin C. Whitehead Award for Medical Research Advocacy from Research!America. (2005)

In June 2001, by an act of Congress, the main plaza at the National Institutes of Health was named in his honor. Recently, Research America established the Paul G. Rogers Society for Global Health Research, which honors Rogers' dedication to the health care policy and advocacy.

U.S. House of Representatives
| Preceded by Dwight L. Rogers | Member of the U.S. House of Representatives from Florida's 6th congressional district 1955–1967 | Succeeded by Sam M. Gibbons |
| Preceded by Don Fuqua | Member of the U.S. House of Representatives from Florida's 9th congressional district 1967–1973 | Succeeded by Louis Frey, Jr. |
| Preceded by Claude Pepper | Member of the U.S. House of Representatives from Florida's 11th congressional district 1973–1979 | Succeeded by Daniel A. Mica |
