= Game of Golf Institute =

Non-profit organization

Game of Golf Institute (GOGI)
- Founded: 2011
- Founder: Derek V. Smith, Randy Myers, Todd Anderson, Kristian Traylor
- Type: Non-profit organization
- Headquarters: Sea Island, Georgia
- Website: www.mygogi.org

Game of Golf Institute (GOGI) is a 501(c)(3) non-profit organization geared towards the growth of recreational golf through the use of technology and education.

== History ==
GOGI was founded in 2011 by Derek V. Smith and golf instructors Todd Anderson and Randy Myers. Co-founder Kristian Traylor joined GOGI in 2012.

== Products ==
Website

GOGI's website facilitates engagement and social sharing among recreational golfers, golf instructors and organizations (clubs, associations, courses) as well as game improvement using instructional videos, swing analysis and stats analysis.

Mobile Applications

GOGI's mobile applications are integrated with the GOGI website. GOGI's mobile applications allow users to access the website's features and instructional videos as well as enter and track golf scores, access golf tips, access the rules of golf, download practice drills and record and analyze golf swings using a smartphone or tablet computer. Actions completed in the applications synchronize with the website.
