= Dwight L. Rogers =

American politician (1886–1954)

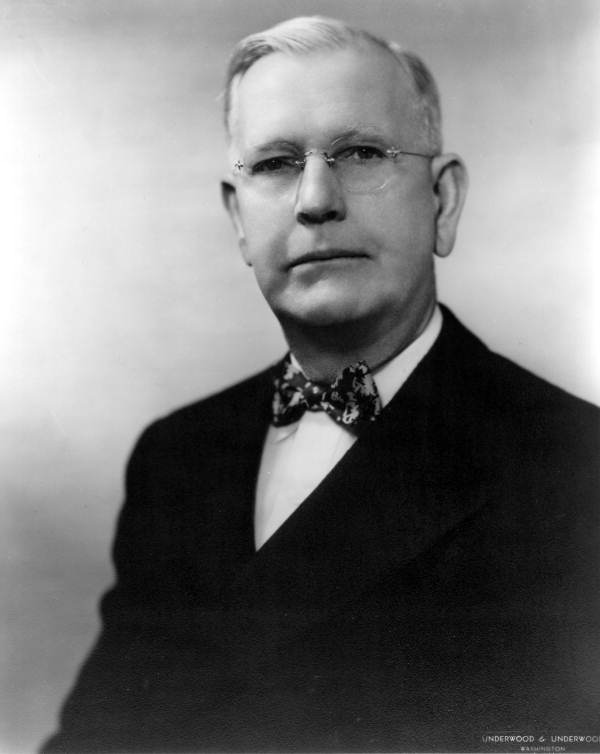

Member of the U.S. House of Representatives from Florida's 6th district
- In office January 3, 1945 – December 1, 1954
- Preceded by: District created
- Succeeded by: Paul Rogers

Member of the Florida House of Representatives
- In office 1930–1938

Personal details
- Born: August 17, 1886 Reidsville, Georgia
- Died: December 1, 1954 (aged 68) Fort Lauderdale, Florida
- Party: Democratic

Dwight Laing Rogers (August 17, 1886 – December 1, 1954) was a U.S. representative from Florida.

Born near Reidsville, Georgia, Rogers attended the public schools and Locust Grove Institute at Locust Grove, Georgia. He graduated from the University of Georgia in 1909 and from the law department of Mercer University in Macon, Georgia in 1910. He was admitted to the bar the same year and began commenced practice in Ocilla, Georgia. He moved to Fort Lauderdale, Florida, in 1925 and continued the practice of law.

He served as member of the Florida House of Representatives from 1930 to 1938, serving as speaker pro tempore in 1933.

Rogers was elected as a Democrat to the Seventy-ninth and to the four succeeding Congresses and served from January 3, 1945, until his death.

He died in Fort Lauderdale, Florida in 1954, and was interred in Lauderdale Memorial Park. He was the father of Paul G. Rogers.

== See also ==
- List of members of the United States Congress who died in office (1950–1999)

U.S. House of Representatives
New district	Member of the U.S. House of Representatives from Florida; 1945 – 1954	Succeeded by Paul Rogers
