= St. Johns County School District =

School district in Florida, United States

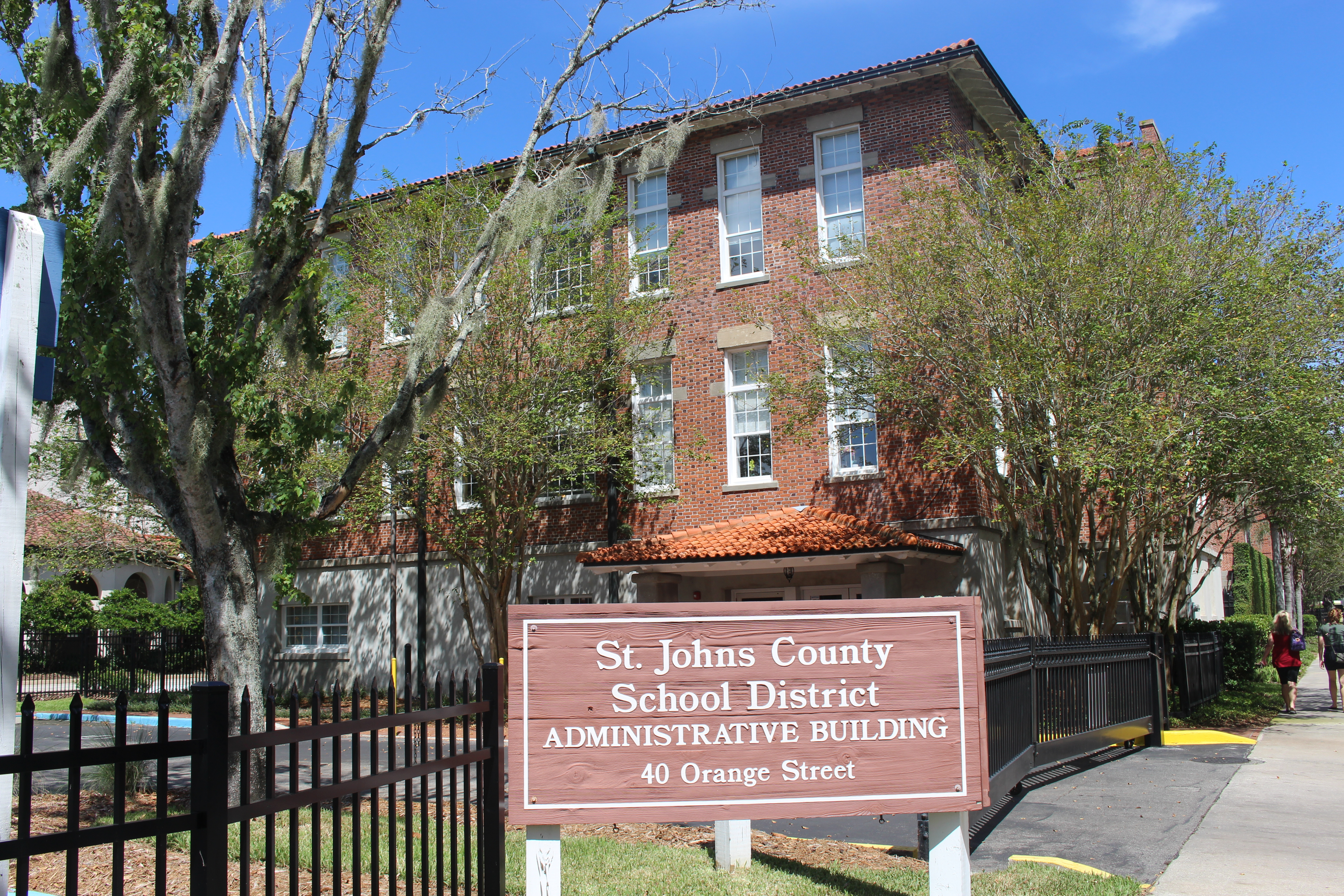

Location
- 40 Orange Street, St. Augustine, St. Johns County, Florida, 32084 United States

District information
- Motto: Excellence in Public Education Since 1869.
- Established: 1869
- Superintendent: Dr. Brennan Asplen
- Schools: 54

Students and staff
- Students: 52,617
- Teachers: 3,625
- Staff: 6,776

Other information
- Website: www.stjohns.k12.fl.us

St. Johns County School District (SJCSD) is the public school district for St. Johns County, Florida. It is the sole school district in the county.

In 2026, the Florida Department of Education's school accountability results placed St. Johns County School District as the #1 school district in the state.

Beginning in the 2026-2027 school year, the district combined St. Johns Technical High School with St. Augustine High School, and created an Early Career Program after the district's a $15 million budget shortfall. Superintendent Dr. Brennan Asplen said the district had the same number of students as the year before, and blamed the new Florida voucher system for the shrinking budget. The voucher system offers $8,000 to students, regardless of income, to attend private schools.

== History ==
- 1924 – Hastings High School is opened for farm children in the southwest corner of St. Johns County
- 1959 – St. Augustine High School is the St. Johns county public high school
- 1981 – Nease High School was opened to alleviate overcrowding at SAHS.
- 2000 – Pedro Menendez High School and Bartram Trail High School are opened to alleviate overcrowding at SAHS and Nease, respectively.
- 2008 – Creekside High School and Ponte Vedra High School are opened to alleviate overcrowding at Bartram Trail and Nease, respectively.
- 2021 – Pine Island Academy and Tocoi Creek High School, in the World Golf Village area of the county, opened to students in Fall 2021.
- 2022 – Beachside High School, opened in Fall 2022 on CR-210
- 2024 - Trout Creek Academy and Lakeside Academy, two K-8 schools, opened to students in 2024.
- 2025 - Hallowes Cove Academy, another K-8 public school opened in 2025 to serve the RiverTown community.
- 2026 - Magnolia Oaks Academy and Sabal Crest Academy, two additional K-8 schools, opened in 2026.
  St. Johns Technical High School and St. Augustine High School combined.
  The Gaines Alternative School relocated to the former St. Johns Technical Centre.

== School board ==
The county administrative offices are located at 40 Orange Street in St. Augustine, Florida. The superintendent of SJCSD is Dr. Brennan Asplen, who administrates the daily operation of public schools in the county. The position of superintendent is appointed by the St. Johns County School Board, a body of five elected officers, each board member representing a specific geographic area. The current School Board members, in order of district number, are Kevin Allen, Anthony E. Coleman Sr., Jennifer Collins, Dr. Tammie McClafferty, and Dr. Linda Thomson. Board members are elected in staggered four years terms with 2-term limits; districts 1, 3 & 5 elected during midterm election cycles (next in 2030) and districts 2 & 4 elected during presidential cycles (next in 2028).

== Growth ==
With the tremendous population growth, the number of St. Johns County academic high schools tripled between 2000 and 2008. For the 2007-2008 school year, the district had an enrollment of 27,514 students, which according to the St. Augustine Record continued its ranking as "one of the fastest-growing school districts in the state" of Florida. That figure reflected a four percent increase (1,040 students) from the previous year. In 2026, the district reached more than 52,000 students in total.

Year	2002	2003	2004	2005	2006	2007	2008	2026
Enrollment	20,918	21,910	23,090	24,320	25,757	26,474	27,514	52,617

== FCAT ==
Florida Public K-12 Schools are graded based on data from the Florida Comprehensive Assessment Test (FCAT) provided by Florida Department of Education. St. Johns County schools received the following marks:

Grade	"A"	"B"	"C"	"D"	"F"
Schools	23	5	1	0	0

== Schools ==
High schools

- Bartram Trail High School
- Beachside High School
- Creekside High School
- Pedro Menendez High School
- Allen D. Nease High School
- Ponte Vedra High School
- St. Augustine High School
- Tocoi Creek High School

K-8 schools (Academies)

- Freedom Crossing
- Hallowes Cove
- Lakeside
- Liberty Pines
- Magnolia Oaks
- Mill Creek
- Palm Valley
- Patriot Oaks
- Pine Island
- Sabal Crest
- Trout Creek
- Valley Ridge

Middle schools

- Alice B. Landrum
- Fruit Cove
- Gamble Rogers
- Pacetti Bay
- R. J. Murray
- Sebastian
- Switzerland Point

Elementary schools

- Cunningham Creek
- Durbin Creek
- Hickory Creek
- James A. Webster
- John A. Crookshank
- Julington Creek
- Ketterlinus
- Ocean Palms
- Osceola
- Otis A. Mason
- Palencia
- Picolata Crossing
- R. B. Hunt
- PVPV-Rawlings
- South Woods
- Timberlin Creek
- Wards Creek
- W. D. Hartley

Alternative schools

- Gaines Alternative School at the Evelyn B. Hamblen Center
- The Evelyn B. Hamblen Center

Former schools

- Hastings High School - Closed in 1985
- Hastings Elementary - Junior High School - Opened in the former Hastings High in 1985, replacing the former Hastings Elementary School. In 1992 it ended its junior high school program, with the new name being Hastings Elementary School. In 2005 it closed, replaced by South Woods Elementary.
- St. Johns Technical High School

== See also ==
- List of high schools in Florida
- Florida School for the Deaf and Blind - A state operated school in St. Augustine
