= St. Johns County, Florida =

County in Florida, United States

- County
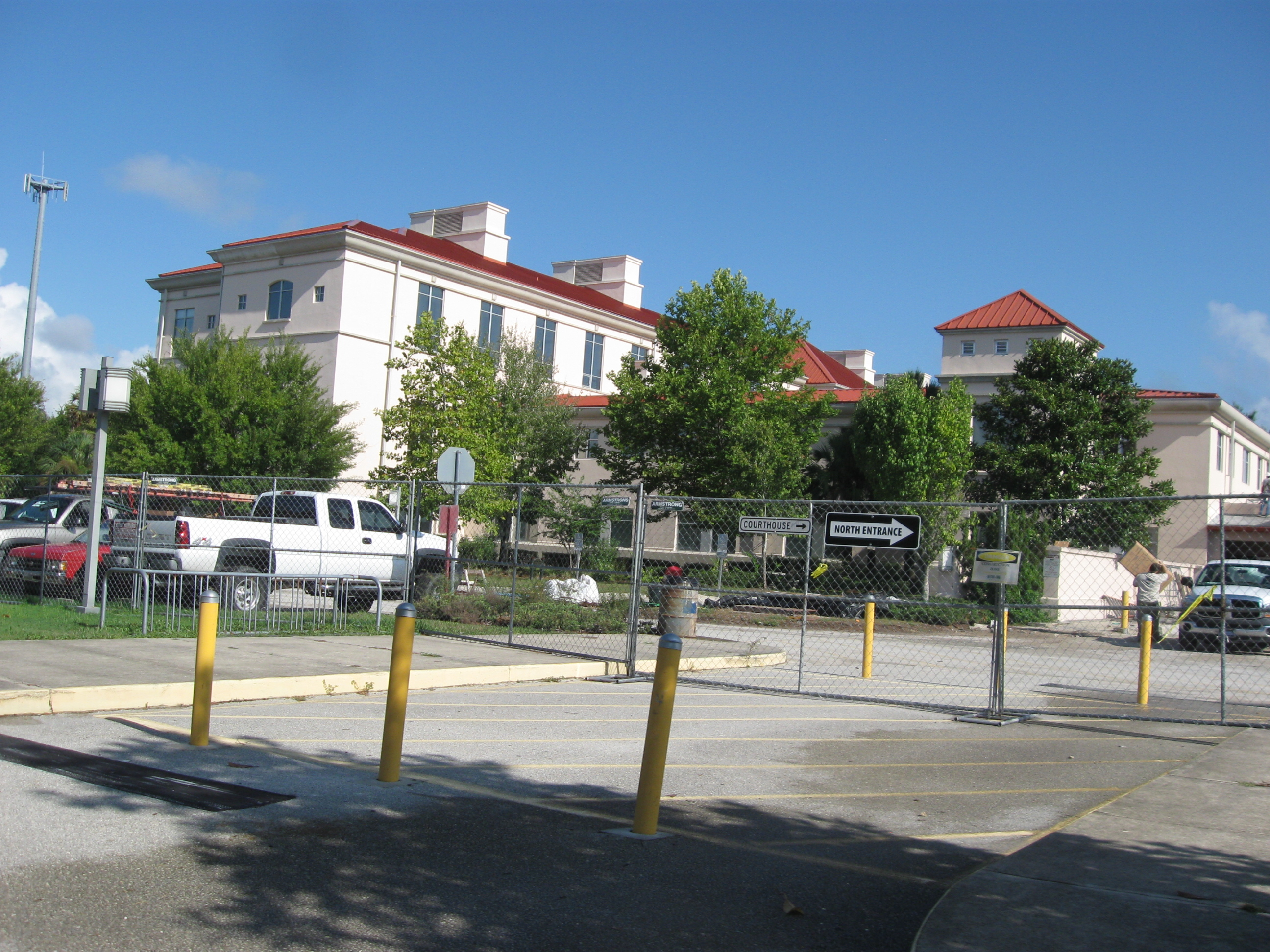
- St. Johns County Courthouse

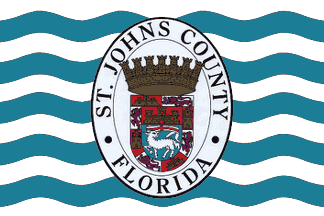
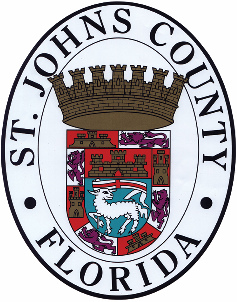
- Flag Seal

- Location within the U.S. state of Florida
- Coordinates: 29°55′N 81°25′W
- Country: United States
- State: Florida
- Founded: July 21, 1821
- Named for: San Juan del Puerto
- Seat: St. Augustine
- Largest community: St. Johns

Area
  - Total: 822 sq mi (2,130 km^{2})
  - Land: 601 sq mi (1,560 km^{2})
  - Water: 221 sq mi (570 km^{2}) 26.9%

Population (2020)
  - Total: 273,425
  - Estimate (2025): 346,328 ▲
  - Density: 557/sq mi (215/km^{2})
- Time zone: UTC−5 (Eastern)
  - Summer (DST): UTC−4 (EDT)
- Congressional districts: 5th, 6th
- Website: www.sjcfl.us

St. Johns County is located in the northeastern part of the U.S. state of Florida. As of the 2020 United States census, its population was 273,425. The county seat and most populous incorporated city is St. Augustine, although the nearby community, St. Johns, has a higher population. St. Johns County is part of the Jacksonville, Florida Metropolitan Statistical Area.

The county was established in 1821. It is one of the two original counties established after Florida was ceded to the United States, at the start of the Florida Territorial period, and corresponded roughly to the former colonial province of East Florida. It was named for the St. Johns River, which runs along its western border.

St. Johns County primarily comprises residential bedroom communities for those who commute to Jacksonville. Tourism, primarily associated with St. Augustine and the many golf courses in the area, is the chief economic industry.

== History ==
St. Johns County's history begins in 1821, when Colonel Robert Butler received Spanish East Florida from Captain-General Colonel José M. Coppinger. Butler represented Major General Andrew Jackson, federal military commissioner for the Florida provinces (las Floridas) with the powers of governor, exercising the powers of the Captain General and the Intendants of the Island of Cuba and the governors of the said provinces, respectively, who ordained that all the country east of the river Suwannee should be designated the County of St. Johns.

St. Johns was established, along with Escambia County (in the former West Florida province), on July 21, 1821, 11 days after Butler received Florida for the United States, and five days after the city of St. Augustine was incorporated.

The name Saint John's was derived from the Spanish mission (c. 1580) San Juan del Puerto ("Saint John of the Harbor"). The U.S. Department of the Interior dropped the apostrophe in 1932 because an apostrophe implied ownership.

It was a huge county, encompassing most of peninsular Florida, more than 39,000 square miles; it was 475 miles long by 165 miles wide. Much of the land was uninhabited. Saint Augustine (1565) was the oldest permanent European settlement, and there were Native Americans in the county as well.

== Coat of arms ==
As described in Certification of the Coat of Arms:

In a field of green an Agnus Dei of silver, suspended on the dexter [*left side of the drawing] side of the Agnus Dei is a silver banner with red cross (as a direct allusion and symbol of the name of the County). On a heraldic chief of red is a gold castle with towers, with masonry joints in black, and with the windows and doors in red (in recognition of the fortress that was constructed in the military garrison of St. Augustine which is a part of the County).

An overall border is composed of eight parts; alternating, a red quadrilateral, with a gold castle and quadrilateral of silver with a purple lion rampant (that is to say, alternating the simplified Arms of Castille and Leon).

Given for a crest is a mural crown of a province. This is a circle of gold walls with in reality twelve gold towers with all the masonry joints in black. Only seven of the towers are visible in the drawing.

== Geography ==
According to the U.S. Census Bureau, the county has an area of 822 square miles (2,130 km^{2}), of which 601 square miles (1,560 km^{2}) is land and 221 square miles (570 km^{2}) (26.9%) is water.

=== Adjacent counties ===
- Duval County, Florida – northwest
- Flagler County, Florida – south
- Putnam County, Florida – southwest
- Clay County, Florida – west

=== National protected areas ===
- Castillo de San Marcos National Monument
- Fort Matanzas National Monument
- Guana Tolomato Matanzas National Estuarine Research Reserve

== Demographics ==
Historical population
Census	Pop.	Note	%±
1830	2,583		—
1840	2,694		4.3%
1850	2,525		−6.3%
1860	3,038		20.3%
1870	2,618		−13.8%
1880	4,535		73.2%
1890	8,712		92.1%
1900	9,165		5.2%
1910	13,208		44.1%
1920	13,061		−1.1%
1930	18,676		43.0%
1940	20,012		7.2%
1950	24,998		24.9%
1960	30,034		20.1%
1970	30,727		2.3%
1980	51,303		67.0%
1990	83,829		63.4%
2000	123,135		46.9%
2010	190,039		54.3%
2020	273,425		43.9%
2025 (est.)	346,328	▲	26.7%
U.S. Decennial Census; 1790-1960 1900-1990; 1990-2000 2010, 2024

=== Racial and ethnic composition ===
St. Johns County, Florida – Racial and ethnic composition Note: the US Census treats Hispanic/Latino as an ethnic category. This table excludes Latinos from the racial categories and assigns them to a separate category. Hispanics/Latinos may be of any race.
Race / Ethnicity (NH = Non-Hispanic)	Pop 1980	Pop 1990	Pop 2000	Pop 2010	Pop 2020	% 1980	% 1990	% 2000	% 2010	% 2020
White alone (NH)	42,520	73,992	109,622	162,194	214,428	82.88%	88.27%	89.03%	85.35%	78.42%
Black or African American alone (NH)	7,384	7,261	7,688	10,388	12,940	14.39%	8.66%	6.24%	5.47%	4.73%
Native American or Alaska Native alone (NH)	75	178	290	457	544	0.15%	0.21%	0.24%	0.24%	0.20%
Asian alone (NH)	165	484	1,162	3,854	9,764	0.32%	0.58%	0.94%	2.03%	3.57%
Native Hawaiian or Pacific Islander alone (NH)	x	x	57	140	151	x	x	0.05%	0.07%	0.06%
Other race alone (NH)	39	12	90	290	1,225	0.08%	0.01%	0.07%	0.15%	0.45%
Mixed race or Multiracial (NH)	x	x	982	2,744	11,766	x	x	0.80%	1.44%	4.30%
Hispanic or Latino (any race)	1,120	1,902	3,244	9,972	22,607	2.18%	2.27%	2.63%	5.25%	8.27%
Total	51,303	83,829	123,135	190,039	273,425	100.00%	100.00%	100.00%	100.00%	100.00%

=== 2020 census ===
As of the 2020 census, the county had a population of 273,425, 104,640 households, and 67,548 families. The median age was 44.0 years; 23.0% of residents were under the age of 18 and 21.1% of residents were 65 years of age or older. For every 100 females there were 93.5 males, and for every 100 females age 18 and over there were 90.4 males age 18 and over.

The racial makeup of the county was 80.6% White, 4.9% Black or African American, 0.3% American Indian and Alaska Native, 3.6% Asian, 0.1% Native Hawaiian and Pacific Islander, 1.7% from some other race, and 8.8% from two or more races. Hispanic or Latino residents of any race comprised 8.3% of the population.

85.2% of residents lived in urban areas, while 14.8% lived in rural areas.

There were 104,640 households, of which 32.6% had children under the age of 18 living in them. Of all households, 59.5% were married-couple households, 12.8% were households with a male householder and no spouse or partner present, and 22.3% were households with a female householder and no spouse or partner present. About 21.8% of all households were made up of individuals and 11.1% had someone living alone who was 65 years of age or older.

There were 119,090 housing units, of which 12.1% were vacant. Among occupied housing units, 80.3% were owner-occupied and 19.7% were renter-occupied. The homeowner vacancy rate was 2.6% and the rental vacancy rate was 14.0%.

=== 2000 census ===
As of the 2000 census, there were 123,135 people, 49,614 households, and 34,084 families residing in the county. The population density was 202 inhabitants per square mile (78/km^{2}). There were 58,008 housing units at an average density of 95 per square mile (37/km^{2}). The racial makeup of the county was 90.92% White, 6.29% African American, 0.26% American Indian, 0.95% Asian, 0.05% Pacific Islander, 0.55% from other races, and 0.97% from two or more races. Hispanic or Latino of any race were 15.8% of the population.

There were 49,614 households, of which 29.2% had children under age 18 living with them, 56.8% were married couples living together, 8.9% had a female householder with no husband present, and 31.3% were non-families. 24.3% of all households were made up of individuals, and 9.4% had someone living alone who was 65 or older. The average household size was 2.44 and the average family size was 2.90.

The age of the population was spread out, with 23.1% under 18, 7.0% from 18 to 24, 27.6% from 25 to 44, 26.4% from 45 to 64, and 15.9% who were 65 or older. The median age was 41. For every 100 females there were 94.5 males. For every 100 females 18 and older, there were 91.5 males.

The median household income was $50,099, and the median family income was $59,153. Males had a median income of $40,783 versus $27,240 for females. The per capita income was $28,674. About 5.1% of families and 8.0% of the population were below the poverty line, including 9.3% of those under 18 and 6.2% of those 65 or older.

== Government ==
United States presidential election results for St. Johns County, Florida
Year	Republican		Democratic		Third party(ies)	
Year	No.	%	No.	%	No.	%
1892	0	0.00%	589	95.46%	28	4.54%
1896	50	7.70%	561	86.44%	38	5.86%
1900	234	21.73%	764	70.94%	79	7.34%
1904	204	21.05%	550	56.76%	215	22.19%
1908	344	25.44%	758	56.07%	250	18.49%
1912	45	3.93%	836	73.08%	263	22.99%
1916	326	19.03%	1,133	66.14%	254	14.83%
1920	1,221	37.98%	1,810	56.30%	184	5.72%
1924	517	27.44%	1,023	54.30%	344	18.26%
1928	1,939	36.65%	3,307	62.50%	45	0.85%
1932	1,265	27.45%	3,344	72.55%	0	0.00%
1936	1,085	24.13%	3,411	75.87%	0	0.00%
1940	1,303	24.02%	4,122	75.98%	0	0.00%
1944	1,582	29.59%	3,764	70.41%	0	0.00%
1948	1,840	29.18%	1,994	31.63%	2,471	39.19%
1952	4,702	51.85%	4,366	48.15%	0	0.00%
1956	5,104	56.44%	3,940	43.56%	0	0.00%
1960	4,125	42.49%	5,583	57.51%	0	0.00%
1964	7,450	63.10%	4,357	36.90%	0	0.00%
1968	3,880	34.31%	2,748	24.30%	4,682	41.40%
1972	8,919	77.48%	2,549	22.14%	43	0.37%
1976	6,660	46.34%	7,412	51.58%	299	2.08%
1980	11,234	59.67%	6,898	36.64%	694	3.69%
1984	16,500	71.26%	6,652	28.73%	2	0.01%
1988	19,228	70.14%	8,029	29.29%	158	0.58%
1992	20,188	50.49%	12,291	30.74%	7,507	18.77%
1996	27,318	56.27%	16,716	34.43%	4,515	9.30%
2000	39,564	65.10%	19,509	32.10%	1,698	2.79%
2004	59,196	68.60%	26,399	30.59%	695	0.81%
2008	69,222	65.25%	35,791	33.74%	1,068	1.01%
2012	78,513	68.25%	35,190	30.59%	1,332	1.16%
2016	88,684	64.34%	43,099	31.27%	6,063	4.40%
2020	110,946	62.66%	63,850	36.06%	2,251	1.27%
2024	128,759	64.87%	66,862	33.68%	2,875	1.45%

The St. Johns County Board of County Commissioners is an elected five-member commission, which appoints a county administrator. The main environmental and agricultural body is the St. Johns County Soil and Water Conservation District, which works closely with other area agencies.

St. Johns County Animal Control operates the St. Johns County Pet Adoption and Holding Center at 130 North Stratton Road.

=== Voter registration ===
According to the Secretary of State's office, Republicans are a majority of registered voters in St. Johns County.

St. Johns County Voter Registration & Party Enrollment as of July 31, 2025:
Political Party	Total Voters	Percentage
Republican	128,424	56.00%
Democratic	47,033	20.51%
No party affiliation	46,919	20.46%
Minor parties	6,942	3.03%
Total	229,318	100.00%

== Education ==
=== Primary and secondary education ===
Public schools are run by the St. Johns County School District, headed by the St. Johns County School Board, an elected five-member board which appoints a superintendent to administer school operations. The system has grown considerably since 2000 to accommodate the county's rapid population growth. It is Florida's top-performing school district in Florida Comprehensive Assessment Test scores, the state's standardized test for public schools. The district also received the 2011 Energy Star Top Performer and Leader from the EPA.

For the 2014–15 school year the district comprised:

- 18 elementary schools (K–5)
- 3 K-8 school (K–8)
- 7 middle schools (6–8)
- 7 high schools (9–12)
- 1 alternative center (K-12)
- 6 charter schools (including a vocational-technical college)
- 1 virtual school

The St. Johns County School District has a robust special education department serving the needs of students with autism, cerebral palsy, and cognitive disabilities. The Florida School for the Deaf and Blind is a residential school for deaf and blind students, funded and operated by the state of Florida. The Catholic Diocese of St. Augustine operates St. Joseph Academy, a private high school in St. Augustine.

St. Johns County schools have received a state government grade of "A" for their work with the students and FCAT grading from 2004 to 2014.

=== Higher education ===
St. Johns River State College, a state college in the Florida College System, has a campus in St. Johns County near St. Augustine. It is accredited by the Southern Association of Colleges and Schools to award associates degrees and two bachelor's degrees.

Flagler College is a private liberal arts institution in downtown St. Augustine. U.S. News & World Report has recognized it as a "Best Value College".

University of St. Augustine for Health Sciences is a school for physical and occupational therapy education.

=== Libraries ===
The St. Johns County Public Library System has six branches:

- Anastasia Island Branch
- Bartram Trail Branch
- Hastings Branch
- Main Library
- Ponte Vedra Beach Branch
- Southeast Branch

St. Augustine Historical Society

- Research Library

=== Museums ===
- Disease Vector Education Center

== Communities ==
=== Cities ===
- St. Augustine
- St. Augustine Beach

=== Town ===
- Marineland (partly in Flagler County)

=== Census-designated places ===
- Butler Beach
- Crescent Beach
- Flagler Estates
- Fruit Cove
- Hastings
- Nocatee
- Palm Valley
- Sawgrass
- St. Augustine Shores
- St. Augustine South
- Vilano Beach
- World Golf Village

=== Other unincorporated communities ===
- Armstrong
- Bakersville
- Elkton
- Julington Creek Plantation
- Mill Creek
- Ponte Vedra Beach
- St. Johns
- Spuds
- Summer Haven
- Switzerland
- Vermont Heights

== Transportation ==
=== Airports ===
- Northeast Florida Regional Airport
- Jacksonville International Airport (JAX) is about 35 miles to the north (in Duval County).

=== Highways ===
- I-95 is the main interstate highway in St. Johns County. It enters from Flagler County over the Pellicer Creek bridges and contains six interchanges within the county before entering Duval County. It also contains four rest areas, the southern pair between Exits 296 and 305 and a northern pair north of exit 329.
- US 1 is the main local road through eastern St. Johns County, running north–south. It served as the main north–south highway in the state and the eastern half of the county until I-95 was built.
- US 1 Bus. is a former section of US 1 and business route of US 1 in Saint Augustine.
- SR A1A is the scenic coastal alternate route to US 1, which also includes some county road spurs and extensions.
- SR 9B
- SR 13 is the other scenic coastal route, but along the Saint Johns River. A section south of the overlap with SR 16 is a county route extension.
- SR 16 runs mostly west-to-east from the Shands Bridge, then turns south along an overlap with SR 13. Leaving the overlap, it passes through Saint Johns and World Golf Village before eventually entering northern St. Augustine ending at U.S. Business Route 1.
- SR 23, the future First Coast Expressway.
- SR 206
- SR 207
- SR 312
- Dixie Highway

=== Railroads ===
- The Florida East Coast Railway provides rail freight services through the county, however the only industries served by the line are a concrete plant and a Con-Agra plant along the Wright Industrial Lead, formerly the Palatka Spur.

== See also ==
- National Register of Historic Places listings in St. Johns County, Florida
- Parks in St. Augustine/St. Johns County, Florida
- St. Johns River
