= List of new members of the 103rd United States Congress =

The 103rd United States Congress began on January 3, 1993. There were ten new senators (five Democrats, five Republicans) and 108 new representatives (61 Democrats, 47 Republicans), as well as two new delegates (both Democrats), at the start of the first session. Additionally, four senators (one Democrat, three Republicans) and eight representatives (three Democrats, five Republicans) took office on various dates in order to fill vacancies during the 103rd Congress before it ended on January 3, 1995.

Due to redistricting after the 1990 census, 27 representatives were elected from newly established congressional districts.

== Senate ==
=== Took office January 3, 1993 ===
State	Image	Senator	Seniority	Switched party	Prior background	Birth year
California		Barbara Boxer (D)	1st (90th overall)	No; Open seat; replaced Alan Cranston (D)	U.S. House of Representatives (Note: Elected to the 98th Congress, serving from 1983 to 1993 in California's 6th district.)	1940
Colorado		Ben Nighthorse Campbell (D)	3rd (92nd overall)	No (Note: Campbell joined the Republican Party in March 1995, during the 104th Congress.); Open seat; replaced Tim Wirth (D)	U.S. House of Representatives (Note: Elected to the 100th Congress, serving from 1987 to 1993 in Colorado's 3rd district.); Colorado House of Representatives	1933
Georgia		Paul Coverdell (R)	7th (96th overall)	Yes; Defeated Wyche Fowler (D)	Director of the Peace Corps; Georgia State Senate	1939
Idaho		Dirk Kempthorne (R)	11th (100th overall)	No; Open seat; replaced Steve Symms (R)	Mayor of Boise	1951
Illinois		Carol Moseley Braun (D)	5th (94th overall)	No; Defeated Alan J. Dixon (D) in a primary	Cook County Recorder of Deeds; Illinois House of Representatives	1947
New Hampshire		Judd Gregg (R)	2nd (91st overall)	No; Open seat; replaced Warren Rudman (R)	Governor of New Hampshire; U.S. House of Representatives (Note: Elected to the 97th Congress, serving from 1981 to 1989 in New Hampshire's 2nd district.); Executive Council of New Hampshire	1947
North Carolina		Lauch Faircloth (R)	6th (95th overall)	Yes; Defeated Terry Sanford (D)	North Carolina Secretary of Commerce	1928
Utah		Bob Bennett (R)	10th (99th overall)	No; Open seat; replaced Jake Garn (R)	Businessman	1933
Washington		Patty Murray (D)	9th (98th overall)	No; Open seat; replaced Brock Adams (D)	Washington State Senate	1950
Wisconsin		Russ Feingold (D)	8th (97th overall)	Yes; Defeated Bob Kasten (R)	Wisconsin Senate	1953

=== Took office during the 103rd Congress ===
State	Image	Senator	Took office	Switched party	Prior background	Birth year
Texas		Bob Krueger (D)	January 21, 1993	No; Appointed; replaced Lloyd Bentsen (D)	Railroad Commission of Texas; U.S. House of Representatives (Note: Elected to the 94th Congress, serving from 1975 to 1979 in Texas's 21st district.)	1935
Texas		Kay Bailey Hutchison (R)	June 14, 1993	Yes; Defeated Bob Krueger (D)	Texas State Treasurer; Texas House of Representatives	1943
Oklahoma		Jim Inhofe (R)	November 16, 1994	Yes; Open seat; replaced David Boren (D)	U.S. House of Representatives (Note: Elected to the 100th Congress, serving from 1987 to 1994 in Oklahoma's 1st district.); Mayor of Tulsa; Oklahoma Senate; Oklahoma House of Representatives	1934
Tennessee		Fred Thompson (R)	December 2, 1994	Yes; Open seat; replaced Harlan Mathews (D)	Attorney	1942

== House of Representatives ==
=== Took office January 3, 1993 ===
District	Representative	Switched party	Prior background	Birth year
Alabama 2	Terry Everett (R)	No	Journalist	1937
Alabama 6	Spencer Bachus (R)	Yes	State Board of Education	1947
Alabama 7	Earl Hilliard (D)	No	State Senator	1942
Arizona 1	Sam Coppersmith (D)	Yes	Law clerk	1955
Arizona 6	Karan English (D)	New seat	State Senator	1949
Arkansas 1	Blanche Lincoln (D)	No	Congressional staffer	1960
Arkansas 3	Tim Hutchinson (R)	No	State Representative	1949
Arkansas 4	Jay Dickey (R)	Yes	City attorney	1939
California 1	Daniel Hamburg (D)	Yes	County Supervisor	1948
California 6	Lynn Woolsey (D)	No	Teacher	1937
California 10	William P. Baker (R)	New seat	State Assemblyman	1940
California 11	Richard Pombo (R)	New seat	City Councilor	1961
California 14	Anna Eshoo (D)	Yes	County Supervisor	1942
California 22	Michael Huffington (R)	No	Deputy Assistant Secretary of Defense	1947
California 25	Buck McKeon (R)	New seat	City Councilor	1938
California 30	Xavier Becerra (D)	No	State Assemblyman	1958
California 33	Lucille Roybal-Allard (D)	New seat	State Assemblywoman	1941
California 36	Jane Harman (D)	No	White House staffer	1945
California 37	Walter R. Tucker III (D)	No	Mayor of Compton	1957
California 38	Steve Horn (R)	Yes	University President	1931
California 39	Ed Royce (R)	No	State Senator	1951
California 41	Jay Kim (R)	New seat	Mayor of Diamond Bar	1939
California 43	Ken Calvert (R)	New seat	Real estate agent	1953
California 49	Lynn Schenk (D)	New seat	Port Commissioner	1945
California 50	Bob Filner (D)	New seat	City Councilor	1942
Colorado 3	Scott McInnis (R)	Yes	State Representative	1953
Delaware at-large	Mike Castle (R)	Yes	Governor of Delaware	1939
Florida 3	Corrine Brown (D)	New seat	State Representative	1946
Florida 4	Tillie Fowler (R)	No	City Councilor	1942
Florida 5	Karen Thurman (D)	New seat	State Senator	1951
Florida 7	John Mica (R)	New seat	State Representative	1943
Florida 12	Charles T. Canady (R)	No	State Representative	1954
Florida 13	Dan Miller (R)	New seat	Businessman	1942
Florida 17	Carrie Meek (D)	No	State Senator	1926
Florida 20	Peter Deutsch (D)	No	State Representative	1957
Florida 21	Lincoln Díaz-Balart (R)	New seat	State Senator	1954
Florida 23	Alcee Hastings (D)	New seat	U.S. District Court Judge	1936
Georgia 1	Jack Kingston (R)	Yes	State Representative	1955
Georgia 2	Sanford Bishop (D)	No	State Senator	1947
Georgia 3	Mac Collins (R)	Yes	State Senator	1944
Georgia 4	John Linder (R)	New seat	State Representative	1942
Georgia 9	Nathan Deal (D)	No (Note: Deal switched to the Republican Party in April 1995.)	State Senator	1942
Georgia 10	Don Johnson Jr. (D)	No	State Senator	1948
Georgia 11	Cynthia McKinney (D)	New seat	State Representative	1955
Idaho 2	Mike Crapo (R)	Yes	State Senator	1951
Illinois 1	Bobby Rush (D)	No	City Councilor	1946
Illinois 2	Mel Reynolds (D)	No	Professor	1952
Illinois 4	Luis Gutiérrez (D)	New seat	City Councilor	1953
Illinois 16	Don Manzullo (R)	Yes	Attorney	1944
Indiana 5	Steve Buyer (R)	Yes	Lawyer	1958
Kentucky 1	Thomas Barlow (D)	No	Businessman	1940
Kentucky 6	Scotty Baesler (D)	Yes	Mayor of Lexington	1941
Louisiana 4	Cleo Fields (D)	New seat	State Senator	1962
Maryland 4	Albert Wynn (D)	New seat	State Senator	1951
Maryland 6	Roscoe Bartlett (R)	Yes	Professor	1926
Massachusetts 3	Peter I. Blute (R)	Yes	State Representative	1956
Massachusetts 5	Marty Meehan (D)	No	Attorney	1956
Massachusetts 6	Peter G. Torkildsen (R)	Yes	State Representative	1958
Michigan 1	Bart Stupak (D)	Yes	State Representative	1952
Michigan 2	Pete Hoekstra (R)	No	Businessman	1953
Michigan 5	James A. Barcia (D)	No	State Senator	1952
Michigan 7	Nick Smith (R)	No	State Senator	1934
Michigan 11	Joe Knollenberg (R)	No	Insurance agent	1933
Minnesota 2	David Minge (DFL)	Yes	Lawyer	1942
Minnesota 6	Rod Grams (R)	Yes	News anchor	1948
Missouri 2	Jim Talent (R)	Yes	State Representative	1956
Missouri 6	Pat Danner (D)	Yes	State Senator	1934
New Jersey 7	Bob Franks (R)	No	State Assemblyman	1951
New Jersey 8	Herb Klein (D)	No	State Assemblyman	1930
New Jersey 13	Bob Menendez (D)	No	State Senator	1954
New York 2	Rick Lazio (R)	Yes	County Legislator	1958
New York 3	Peter T. King (R)	No	County Comptroller	1944
New York 4	David A. Levy (R)	No	Town Councilor	1953
New York 12	Nydia Velázquez (D)	No	City Councilor	1953
New York 14	Carolyn Maloney (D)	Yes	City Councilor	1946
New York 24	John M. McHugh (R)	No	State Senator	1948
New York 26	Maurice Hinchey (D)	No	State Assemblyman	1938
New York 30	Jack Quinn (R)	Yes	Town Supervisor	1951
North Carolina 12	Mel Watt (D)	New seat	State Senator	1945
North Dakota at-large	Earl Pomeroy (D–NPL)	No	North Dakota Insurance Commissioner	1952
Ohio 1	David S. Mann (D)	No	Mayor of Cincinnati	1939
Ohio 6	Ted Strickland (D)	Yes	Psychologist	1941
Ohio 10	Martin Hoke (R)	Yes	Businessman	1952
Ohio 13	Sherrod Brown (D)	No	Ohio Secretary of State	1952
Ohio 15	Deborah Pryce (R)	No	Judge	1951
Ohio 19	Eric Fingerhut (D)	No	State Senator	1959
Oklahoma 5	Ernest Istook (R)	No	Lawyer	1950
Oregon 1	Elizabeth Furse (D)	No	Businesswoman	1936
Pennsylvania 4	Ron Klink (D)	No	Journalist	1951
Pennsylvania 6	Tim Holden (D)	No	Sheriff	1957
Pennsylvania 8	James C. Greenwood (R)	Yes	State Senator	1951
Pennsylvania 13	Marjorie Margolies (D)	Yes	Journalist	1942
Pennsylvania 15	Paul McHale (D)	Yes	State Representative	1950
South Carolina 4	Bob Inglis (R)	Yes	Lawyer	1959
South Carolina 6	Jim Clyburn (D)	No	Advisor	1940
Texas 23	Henry Bonilla (R)	Yes	News executive	1954
Texas 28	Frank Tejeda (D)	New seat	State Senator	1945
Texas 29	Gene Green (D)	New seat	State Senator	1947
Texas 30	Eddie Bernice Johnson (D)	New seat	State Senator	1935
Utah 2	Karen Shepherd (D)	No	State Senator	1940
Virginia 3	Bobby Scott (D)	New seat	State Senator	1947
Virginia 6	Bob Goodlatte (R)	Yes	Lawyer	1952
Virginia 11	Leslie Byrne (D)	New seat	State Delegate	1946
Washington 1	Maria Cantwell (D)	Yes	State Representative	1958
Washington 4	Jay Inslee (D)	Yes	State Representative	1951
Washington 8	Jennifer Dunn (R)	No	State Party Chair	1941
Washington 9	Mike Kreidler (D)	New seat	State Senator	1943
Wisconsin 5	Tom Barrett (D)	No	State Senator	1953

==== Non-voting members ====
District	Delegate	Switched party	Prior background	Birth year
Guam at-large	Robert A. Underwood (D)	Yes	Educator	1948
Puerto Rico at-large	Carlos Romero Barceló (NP/D)	Yes/No (Note: The previous delegate, Antonio Colorado, was registered as Popular Democratic/Democratic.)	Governor of Puerto Rico	1932

=== Took office during the 103rd Congress ===
District	Representative	Took office	Switched party	Prior background	Birth year
Mississippi 2	Bennie Thompson (D)	April 13, 1993	No	County Supervisor	1948
Ohio 2	Rob Portman (R)	May 4, 1993	No	White House Counsel	1955
Wisconsin 1	Peter W. Barca (D)	May 4, 1993	No	State Assemblyman	1955
California 17	Sam Farr (D)	June 8, 1993	No	State Assemblyman	1941
Michigan 3	Vern Ehlers (R)	December 7, 1993	No	State Senator	1934
Oklahoma 6	Frank Lucas (R)	May 10, 1994	Yes	Farmer	1960
Kentucky 2	Ron Lewis (R)	May 24, 1994	Yes	Pastor	1946
Oklahoma 1	Steve Largent (R)	November 29, 1994	No	Football player	1954

== See also ==
- List of United States representatives in the 103rd Congress
- List of United States senators in the 103rd Congress

== Notes ==
Preceded by New members of the 102nd Congress	New members of the 103rd Congress; 1993–1995	Succeeded by New members of the 104th Congress
