= Rich Nugent =

American politician (born 1951)

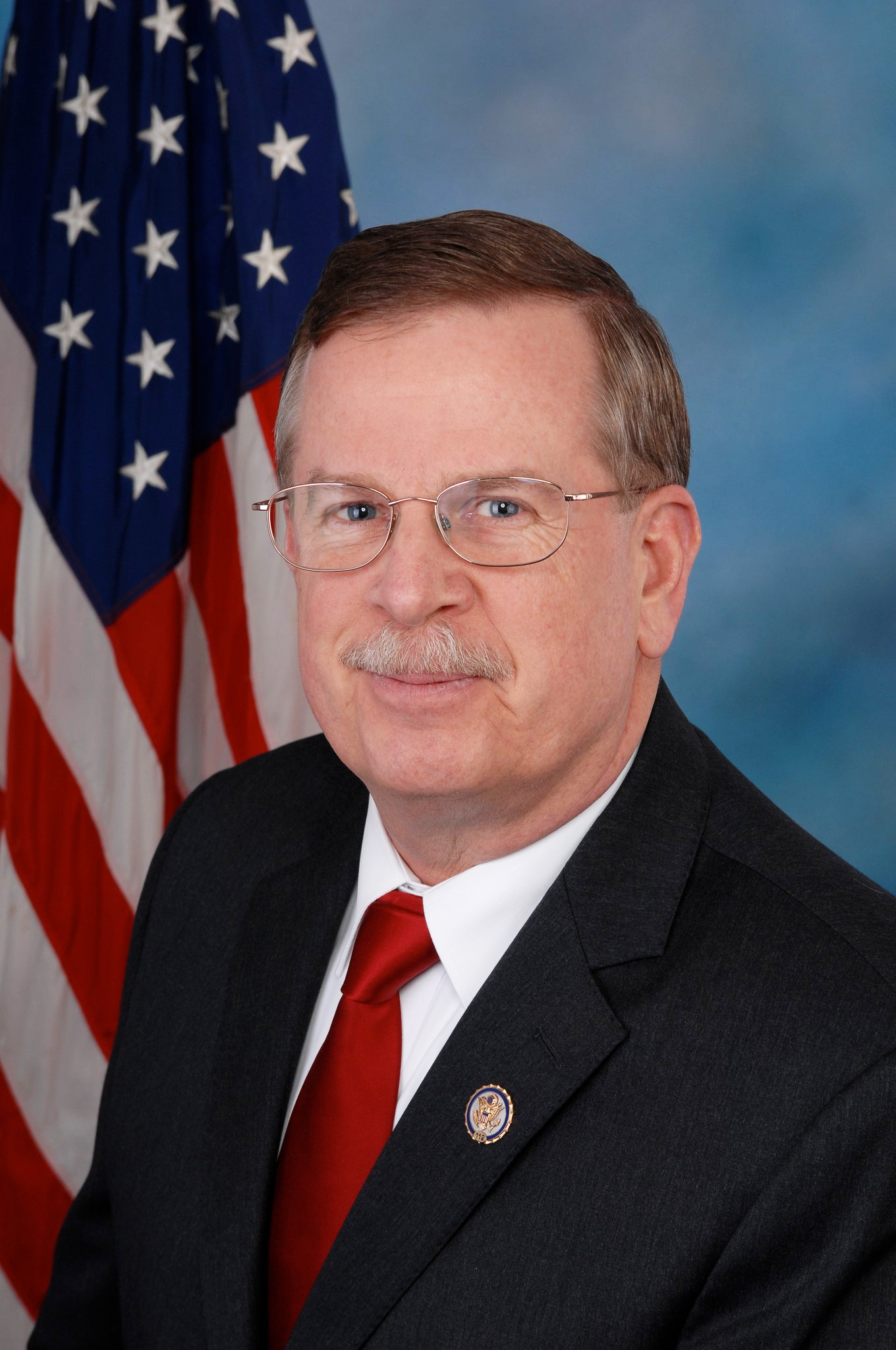

Member of the U.S. House of Representatives from Florida
- In office January 3, 2011 – January 3, 2017
- Preceded by: Ginny Brown-Waite
- Succeeded by: Daniel Webster
- Constituency: 5th district (2011–2013); 11th district (2013–2017)

Sheriff of Hernando County
- In office 2000–2010
- Preceded by: Tom Mylander
- Succeeded by: Al Nienhuis

Personal details
- Born: May 26, 1951 (age 75) Evergreen Park, Illinois, U.S.
- Party: Republican
- Spouse: Wendy Nugent
- Children: 3
- Education: Saint Leo University (BA); Troy University (MPA)

Military service
- Branch/service: United States Air Force
- Years of service: 1969–1975
- Unit: Illinois Air National Guard

Richard B. "Rich" Nugent (born May 26, 1951) is an American retired law enforcement officer and former United States Congressman. He is a member of the Republican Party. He is a former Sheriff of Hernando County, Florida. On November 2, 2010, Richard Nugent defeated Democratic nominee James Piccillo, to replace retiring Congresswoman Ginny Brown-Waite. Nugent was a member of the Tea Party Caucus. On November 2, 2015, Nugent announced he would not seek reelection.

== Early life, education, and early law enforcement career ==
Nugent was born on May 26, 1951. He is a native of Evergreen Park, Illinois, a suburb of Chicago. His father was a steel worker and his mother was a homemaker.

After high school Nugent joined the Illinois Air National Guard for six years. He then continued serving as a police officer in the city of Romeoville, Illinois. After serving as a police officer in Romeoville for 12 years, Nugent and his family moved to Hernando County, Florida in 1984, where he joined the Hernando County Sheriff's office as a deputy.

Nugent graduated from St. Leo College, located in St. Leo, Pasco County, Florida with a Bachelor of Arts Degree. He went on to earn a Master of Arts Degree from Troy State University. In 1991 Congressman Nugent graduated from the FBI National Academy.

== Sheriff of Hernando County ==
Nugent was elected Sheriff of Hernando County in 2000, defeating James E. "Eddie" McConnell.

=== Election results ===
He was re-elected Sheriff in 2004 and 2008.

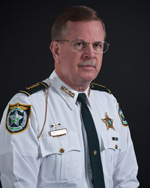
Sheriff Nugent

2000 Hernando County Sheriff election
Party	Candidate	Votes	%	±%
Republican	Rich Nugent	31,204	49.0	
Democratic	Eddie McConnell	29,334	46.1	
Independent	Michael Robinson	3,088	4.9	

2004 Hernando County Sheriff election
Party	Candidate	Votes	%	±%
Republican	Rich Nugent (Incumbent)	48,771	61.6	
Democratic	Eddie McConnell	30,372	38.4	

2008 Hernando County Sheriff election
Party	Candidate	Votes	%	±%
Republican	Rich Nugent (Incumbent)	62,807	73.6	
Democratic	Luke Frazier	22,153	26.0	
Independent	Michael Robinson	334	0.4	

== U.S. House of Representatives ==
=== 2010 election ===
Republican Congresswoman Ginny Brown-Waite decided not to run for re-election in the 5th Congressional District of Florida, due to health concerns. She asked Nugent to run for her seat. Nugent won the Republican primary and was endorsed during his campaign by former Governor of Arkansas Mike Huckabee, and by several Florida newspapers, including the Orlando Sentinel, Tampa Bay Times, and the Tampa Tribune.

Nugent beat Tea Party favorite Jason Sager in the primary and won against Democrat Jim Piccillo in the general election. The New York Times had rated this race as solidly Republican. The Ocala online newspaper reported that In the 5th Congressional District, Nugent swept past Democrat Jim Piccillo, a political newcomer from Lutz, receiving 67 percent of the vote to 33 percent.

=== Tenure ===
In his first two months in Congress he co-sponsored 29 pieces of legislation, including H.R. 2 – Repeal of the Health Care Law Act, H.R.25 – The Fair Tax Act of 2011, H.R. 49 – American Energy Independence and Price Reduction Act, H.R. 121 – Congressional Budget Accountability Act, H.R. 127 – to deauthorize appropriation of funds to carry out the Patient Protection and Affordable Care Act and the Health Care and Education Reconciliation Act of 2010, H.R. 144 – Small Business Paperwork Mandate Elimination Act of 2011, H.R. 154 – Defund the Individual Mandate Act, Hr. 177 – Death Tax Repeal Act, H.R. 178 – Military Surviving Spouses Equity Act, H.R. 333 – Disabled Veterans Tax Termination Act and H.R. 42` – To eliminate automatic pay adjustments for Members of Congress. Nugent has also co-sponsored H.J. Res.1 – Proposing a balanced budget amendment to the Constitution of the United States.

Spending cuts

Nugent is against what he terms out of control spending presently happening in Washington. He opposed the $700 billion bailout by President George W. Bush, a temporary fix for de-regulation of the banking and finance industries, two unfunded Bush-era wars, and a decades-long wage decrease. He also opposed the Obama Administration's $862 billion stimulus package.

Tax Reform

Nugent signed on as a co-sponsor of H.R. 25, better known as "The Fair Tax". This legislation introduced by Rep. Rob Woodall (R-GA) would abolish the Internal Revenue Service (IRS), repeal the federal income tax, and replace it with a transparent tax on consumption.

In 2010 Nugent signed a pledge sponsored by Americans for Prosperity promising to vote against any Global Warming legislation that would raise taxes.

Health Care Act

Nugent opposed the passage of President Barack Obama's health care legislation and has vowed to work for its repeal. He has stated that he is open to listening to anybody's plan to save and reform Medicare so long as benefits are completely unchanged for those 55 and up.

=== Committee assignments ===
Nugent serves on the Committee on House Administration. Nugent formerly served on the House Committee on Rules . In January 2015, Nugent was removed from that committee, in an apparent retribution for voting against John Boehner as House Speaker.

Nugent belongs to several House caucus groups, including the Congressional Sportsman's Caucus, The Constitution Caucus, The Military Family Caucus, the Congressional Cement Caucus, the Tea Party Caucus and the Congressional Constitution Caucus.

== Personal life ==
In 1975, Rich married Wendy Nugent and they have three boys. The Nugent family have been members of the First United Methodist Church of Spring Hill since 1985.

On November 2, 2015, Nugent announced that he would leave Congress at the end of his term on January 3, 2017. Among the reasons given for leaving office, Nugent cited a desire to spend more time with family: "After five years of living out of a suitcase, saying goodbye almost weekly to my beloved wife, and seeing pictures of the grandkids instead of spending more of that quality time with them, the tug of being apart from family has just become too great."

U.S. House of Representatives
Preceded by Ginny Brown-Waite	Member of the U.S. House of Representatives from Florida's 5th congressional district 2011–2013	Succeeded by Corrine Brown
Preceded by Kathy Castor	Member of the U.S. House of Representatives from Florida's 11th congressional district 2013–2017	Succeeded by Daniel Webster
U.S. order of precedence (ceremonial)
Preceded by Alan Grayson as Former U.S. Representative	Order of precedence of the United States as Former U.S. Representative	Succeeded by Val Demings as Former U.S. Representative
