= List of United States representatives in the 103rd Congress =

This is a complete list of United States representatives during the 103rd United States Congress listed by seniority.

As an historical article, the districts and party affiliations listed reflect those during the 103rd Congress (January 3, 1993 – January 3, 1995). Seats and party affiliations on similar lists for other congresses will be different for certain members.

Seniority depends on the date on which members were sworn into office. Since many members are sworn in on the same day, subsequent ranking is based on previous congressional service of the individual and then by alphabetical order by the last name of the representative.

Committee chairmanship in the House is often associated with seniority. However, party leadership is typically not associated with seniority.

Note: The "*" indicates that the representative/delegate may have served one or more non-consecutive terms while in the House of Representatives of the United States Congress.

== U.S. House seniority list ==
U.S. House seniority
Rank	Representative	Party	District	Seniority date (Previous service, if any)	No.# of term(s)	Notes
1	Jamie Whitten	D	MS-01	November 4, 1941	27th term	Dean of the House; Left the House in 1995.
2	Jack Brooks	D	TX-09	January 3, 1953	21st term	Left the House in 1995.
3	William Natcher	D	KY-02	August 1, 1953	21st term	Died on March 29, 1994.
4	John Dingell	D	MI-16	December 13, 1955	20th term	
5	Robert Michel	R	IL-18	January 3, 1957	19th term	Left the House in 1995.
6	Dan Rostenkowski	D	IL-05	January 3, 1959	18th term	Left the House in 1995.
7	Neal Smith	D	IA-04	January 3, 1959	18th term	Left the House in 1995.
8	Henry B. González	D	TX-20	November 4, 1961	17th term	
9	Don Edwards	D	CA-16	January 3, 1963	16th term	Left the House in 1995.
10	Sam Gibbons	D	FL-11	January 3, 1963	16th term	
11	Joseph McDade	R	PA-10	January 3, 1963	16th term	
12	Jimmy Quillen	R	TN-01	January 3, 1963	16th term	
13	J. J. Pickle	D	TX-10	December 21, 1963	16th term	Left the House in 1995.
14	Sidney Yates	D	IL-09	January 3, 1965; Previous service, 1949–1963.	22nd term*	
15	John Conyers	D	MI-14	January 3, 1965	15th term	
16	Kika de la Garza	D	TX-15	January 3, 1965	15th term	
17	Tom Foley	D	WA-05	January 3, 1965	15th term	Speaker of the House; Left the House in 1995.
18	William Ford	D	MI-13	January 3, 1965	15th term	Left the House in 1995.
19	Lee Hamilton	D	IN-09	January 3, 1965	15th term	
20	Tom Bevill	D	AL-04	January 3, 1967	14th term	
21	Sonny Montgomery	D	MS-03	January 3, 1967	14th term	
22	John Myers	R	IN-07	January 3, 1967	14th term	
23	Bill Clay	D	MO-01	January 3, 1969	13th term	
24	Hamilton Fish	R	NY-19	January 3, 1969	13th term	Left the House in 1995.
25	Louis Stokes	D	OH-11	January 3, 1969	13th term	
26	Dave Obey	D	WI-07	April 1, 1969	13th term	
27	Phil Crane	R	IL-08	November 25, 1969	13th term	
28	Bill Archer	R	TX-07	January 3, 1971	12th term	
29	Les Aspin	D	WI-01	January 3, 1971	12th term	Resigned on January 20, 1993.
30	Ron Dellums	D	CA-09	January 3, 1971	12th term	
31	Romano Mazzoli	D	KY-03	January 3, 1971	12th term	Left the House in 1995.
32	Charles Rangel	D	NY-15	January 3, 1971	12th term	
33	Floyd Spence	R	SC-02	January 3, 1971	12th term	
34	Bill Young	R	FL-10	January 3, 1971	12th term	
35	George Brown	D	CA-42	January 3, 1973; Previous service, 1963–1971.	15th term*	
36	Benjamin Gilman	R	NY-20	January 3, 1973	11th term	
37	Ralph Regula	R	OH-16	January 3, 1973	11th term	
38	Charlie Rose	D	NC-07	January 3, 1973	11th term	
39	Bud Shuster	R	PA-09	January 3, 1973	11th term	
40	Joe Moakley	D	MA-09	January 3, 1973	11th term	
41	Carlos Moorhead	R	CA-27	January 3, 1973	11th term	
42	Pat Schroeder	D	CO-1	January 3, 1973	11th term	
43	Pete Stark	D	CA-13	January 3, 1973	11th term	
44	Gerry Studds	D	MA-10	January 3, 1973	11th term	
45	Charlie Wilson	D	TX-02	January 3, 1973	11th term	
46	Don Young	R	AK	March 6, 1973	11th term	
47	Cardiss Collins	D	IL-07	June 5, 1973	11th term	
48	John Murtha	D	PA-12	February 5, 1974	11th term	
49	Andrew Jacobs Jr.	D	IN-10	January 3, 1975; Previous service, 1965–1973.	14th term*	
50	Butler Derrick	D	SC-03	January 3, 1975	10th term	Left the House in 1995.
51	Glenn English	D	OK-06	January 3, 1975	10th term	Resigned on January 7, 1994.
52	Harold Ford	D	TN-09	January 3, 1975	10th term	
53	Bill Goodling	R	PA-19	January 3, 1975	10th term	
54	Bill Gradison	R	OH-02	January 3, 1975	10th term	Resigned on January 31, 1993.
55	Bill Hefner	D	NC-08	January 3, 1975	10th term	
56	William Hughes	D	NJ-02	January 3, 1975	10th term	Left the House in 1995.
57	Henry Hyde	R	IL-06	January 3, 1975	10th term	
58	John LaFalce	D	NY-29	January 3, 1975	10th term	
59	Marilyn Lloyd	D	TN-03	January 3, 1975	10th term	Left the House in 1995.
60	George Miller	D	CA-07	January 3, 1975	10th term	
61	Norman Mineta	D	CA-15	January 3, 1975	10th term	
62	Stephen Neal	D	NC-05	January 3, 1975	10th term	Left the House in 1995.
63	James Oberstar	D	MN-08	January 3, 1975	10th term	
64	Philip Sharp	D	IN-02	January 3, 1975	10th term	Left the House in 1995.
65	Henry Waxman	D	CA-29	January 3, 1975	10th term	
66	Ed Markey	D	MA-07	November 2, 1976	10th term	
67	Douglas Applegate	D	OH-18	January 3, 1977	9th term	Left the House in 1995.
68	Anthony Beilenson	D	CA-24	January 3, 1977	9th term	
69	David Bonior	D	MI-10	January 3, 1977	9th term	
70	Norm Dicks	D	WA-06	January 3, 1977	9th term	
71	Dick Gephardt	D	MO-03	January 3, 1977	9th term	
72	Dan Glickman	D	KS-04	January 3, 1977	9th term	Left the House in 1995.
73	Dale Kildee	D	MI-09	January 3, 1977	9th term	
74	Jim Leach	R	IA-01	January 3, 1977	9th term	
75	Austin Murphy	D	PA-20	January 3, 1977	9th term	Left the House in 1995.
76	Leon Panetta	D	CA-17	January 3, 1977	9th term	Resigned on January 22, 1993.
77	Nick Rahall	D	WV-03	January 3, 1977	9th term	
78	Ike Skelton	D	MO-04	January 3, 1977	9th term	
79	Bob Stump	R	AZ-03	January 3, 1977	9th term	
80	Bruce Vento	D	MN-04	January 3, 1977	9th term	
81	Harold Volkmer	D	MO-09	January 3, 1977	9th term	
82	Bob Walker	R	PA-16	January 3, 1977	9th term	
83	Bob Livingston	R	LA-01	August 27, 1977	9th term	
84	Doug Bereuter	R	NE-01	January 3, 1979	8th term	
85	William Clinger	R	PA-05	January 3, 1979	8th term	
86	Julian Dixon	D	CA-32	January 3, 1979	8th term	
87	Vic Fazio	D	CA-03	January 3, 1979	8th term	
88	Martin Frost	D	TX-24	January 3, 1979	8th term	
89	Newt Gingrich	R	GA-06	January 3, 1979	8th term	
90	Tony Hall	D	OH-03	January 3, 1979	8th term	
91	Earl Hutto	D	FL-01	January 3, 1979	8th term	Left the House in 1995.
92	Jerry Lewis	R	CA-40	January 3, 1979	8th term	
93	Bob Matsui	D	CA-05	January 3, 1979	8th term	
94	Toby Roth	R	WI-08	January 3, 1979	8th term	
95	Martin Olav Sabo	D	MN-05	January 3, 1979	8th term	
96	Jim Sensenbrenner	R	WI-09	January 3, 1979	8th term	
97	Olympia Snowe	R	ME-02	January 3, 1979	8th term	Left the House in 1995.
98	Gerald Solomon	R	NY-22	January 3, 1979	8th term	
99	Charles Stenholm	D	TX-17	January 3, 1979	8th term	
100	Al Swift	D	WA-02	January 3, 1979	8th term	Left the House in 1995.
101	Mike Synar	D	OK-02	January 3, 1979	8th term	Left the House in 1995.
102	Bill Thomas	R	CA-21	January 3, 1979	8th term	
103	Pat Williams	D	MT	January 3, 1979	8th term	
104	Tom Petri	R	WI-06	April 3, 1979	8th term	
105	John Porter	R	IL-10	January 22, 1980	8th term	
106	Billy Tauzin	D	LA-03	May 22, 1980	8th term	
107	Thomas Bliley	R	VA-07	January 3, 1981	7th term	
108	William Coyne	D	PA-14	January 3, 1981	7th term	
109	David Dreier	R	CA-28	January 3, 1981	7th term	
110	Bill Emerson	R	MO-08	January 3, 1981	7th term	
111	Jack Fields	R	TX-08	January 3, 1981	7th term	
112	Thomas Foglietta	D	PA-01	January 3, 1981	7th term	
113	Barney Frank	D	MA-04	January 3, 1981	7th term	
114	Sam Gejdenson	D	CT-02	January 3, 1981	7th term	
115	Steve Gunderson	R	WI-03	January 3, 1981	7th term	
116	Ralph Hall	D	TX-04	January 3, 1981	7th term	
117	Jim Hansen	R	UT-01	January 3, 1981	7th term	
118	Duncan Hunter	R	CA-52	January 3, 1981	7th term	
119	Tom Lantos	D	CA-12	January 3, 1981	7th term	
120	Bill McCollum	R	FL-08	January 3, 1981	7th term	
121	Dave McCurdy	D	OK-04	January 3, 1981	7th term	Left the House in 1995.
122	Pat Roberts	R	KS-01	January 3, 1981	7th term	
123	Hal Rogers	R	KY-05	January 3, 1981	7th term	
124	Marge Roukema	R	NJ-05	January 3, 1981	7th term	
125	Chuck Schumer	D	NY-09	January 3, 1981	7th term	
126	Clay Shaw	R	FL-22	January 3, 1981	7th term	
127	Joe Skeen	R	NM-02	January 3, 1981	7th term	
128	Christopher Smith	R	NJ-04	January 3, 1981	7th term	
129	Frank Wolf	R	VA-10	January 3, 1981	7th term	
130	Ron Wyden	D	OR-03	January 3, 1981	7th term	
131	Steny Hoyer	D	MD-05	May 19, 1981	7th term	
132	Mike Oxley	R	OH-04	June 25, 1981	7th term	
133	Barbara Kennelly	D	CT-01	January 12, 1982	7th term	
134	Matthew G. Martínez	D	CA-31	July 13, 1982	7th term	
135	Bob Carr	D	MI-08	January 3, 1983; Previous service, 1975–1981.	9th term*	Left the House in 1995.
136	Michael Andrews	D	TX-25	January 3, 1983	6th term	Left the House in 1995.
137	Herb Bateman	R	VA-01	January 3, 1983	6th term	
138	Howard Berman	D	CA-26	January 3, 1983	6th term	
139	Michael Bilirakis	R	FL-09	January 3, 1983	6th term	
140	Sherwood Boehlert	D	NY-23	January 3, 1983	6th term	
141	Robert Borski	D	PA-03	January 3, 1983	6th term	
142	Rick Boucher	D	VA-09	January 3, 1983	6th term	
143	John Bryant	D	TX-05	January 3, 1983	6th term	
144	Dan Burton	R	IN-06	January 3, 1983	6th term	
145	Ron Coleman	D	TX-16	January 3, 1983	6th term	
146	Jim Cooper	D	TN-04	January 3, 1983	6th term	Left the House in 1995.
147	Dick Durbin	D	IL-20	January 3, 1983	6th term	
148	Lane Evans	D	IL-17	January 3, 1983	6th term	
149	George Gekas	R	PA-17	January 3, 1983	6th term	
150	Nancy Johnson	R	CT-06	January 3, 1983	6th term	
151	Marcy Kaptur	D	OH-09	January 3, 1983	6th term	
152	John Kasich	R	OH-12	January 3, 1983	6th term	
153	Richard Lehman	D	CA-19	January 3, 1983	6th term	Left the House in 1995.
154	Sander Levin	D	MI-12	January 3, 1983	6th term	
155	Tom Lewis	R	FL-16	January 3, 1983	6th term	Left the House in 1995.
156	Bill Lipinski	D	IL-03	January 3, 1983	6th term	
157	Al McCandless	R	CA-44	January 3, 1983	6th term	Left the House in 1995.
158	Alan Mollohan	D	WV-01	January 3, 1983	6th term	
159	Solomon Ortiz	D	TX-27	January 3, 1983	6th term	
160	Major Owens	D	NY-11	January 3, 1983	6th term	
161	Ron Packard	R	CA-48	January 3, 1983	6th term	
162	Tim Penny	D	MN-01	January 3, 1983	6th term	Left the House in 1995.
163	Bill Richardson	D	NM-03	January 3, 1983	6th term	
164	Tom Ridge	R	PA-21	January 3, 1983	6th term	Left the House in 1995.
165	J. Roy Rowland	D	GA-08	January 3, 1983	6th term	Left the House in 1995.
166	Norman Sisisky	D	VA-04	January 3, 1983	6th term	
167	Jim Slattery	D	KS-02	January 3, 1983	6th term	Left the House in 1995.
168	Robert Smith	R	OR-02	January 3, 1983	6th term	Left the House in 1995.
169	John Spratt	D	SC-05	January 3, 1983	6th term	
170	Don Sundquist	R	TN-07	January 3, 1983	6th term	Left the House in 1995.
171	Esteban Torres	D	CA-34	January 3, 1983	6th term	
172	Robert Torricelli	D	NJ-09	January 3, 1983	6th term	
173	Ed Towns	D	NY-10	January 3, 1983	6th term	
174	Tim Valentine	D	NC-02	January 3, 1983	6th term	Left the House in 1995.
175	Barbara Vucanovich	R	NV-02	January 3, 1983	6th term	
176	Alan Wheat	D	MO-05	January 3, 1983	6th term	Left the House in 1995.
177	Bob Wise	D	WV-02	January 3, 1983	6th term	
178	Gary Ackerman	D	NY-05	March 1, 1983	6th term	
179	Daniel Schaefer	R	CO-06	March 29, 1983	6th term	
180	George Darden	D	GA-07	November 8, 1983	6th term	Left the House in 1995.
181	Jerry Kleczka	D	WI-04	April 3, 1984	6th term	
182	Jim Saxton	R	NJ-03	November 6, 1984	6th term	
183	Bob Dornan	R	CA-46	January 3, 1985; Previous service, 1977–1983.	8th term*	
184	Dick Armey	R	TX-26	January 3, 1985	5th term	
185	Joe Barton	R	TX-06	January 3, 1985	5th term	
186	Helen Delich Bentley	R	MD-02	January 3, 1985	5th term	Left the House in 1995.
187	Sonny Callahan	R	AL-01	January 3, 1985	5th term	
188	Howard Coble	R	NC-06	January 3, 1985	5th term	
189	Larry Combest	R	TX-19	January 3, 1985	5th term	
190	Tom DeLay	R	TX-22	January 3, 1985	5th term	
191	Harris Fawell	R	IL-13	January 3, 1985	5th term	
192	Dean Gallo	R	NJ-11	January 3, 1985	5th term	Died on November 6, 1994.
193	Bart Gordon	D	TN-06	January 3, 1985	5th term	
194	Paul Henry	R	MI-03	January 3, 1985	5th term	Died on July 31, 1993.
195	Paul Kanjorski	D	PA-11	January 3, 1985	5th term	
196	Jim Kolbe	R	AZ-05	January 3, 1985	5th term	
197	Jim Lightfoot	R	IA-03	January 3, 1985	5th term	
198	Thomas Manton	D	NY-07	January 3, 1985	5th term	
199	Alex McMillan	R	NC-09	January 3, 1985	5th term	Left the House in 1995.
200	Jan Meyers	R	KS-03	January 3, 1985	5th term	
201	James Traficant	D	OH-17	January 3, 1985	5th term	
202	Pete Visclosky	D	IN-01	January 3, 1985	5th term	
203	Frank McCloskey	D	IN-08	May 1, 1985; Previous service, 1983–1985.	6th term*	Left the House in 1995.
204	Jim Chapman	D	TX-01	August 3, 1985	5th term	
205	Cass Ballenger	R	NC-10	November 4, 1986	5th term	
206	Richard Baker	R	LA-06	January 3, 1987	4th term	
207	James Bilbray	D	NV-01	January 3, 1987	4th term	Left the House in 1995.
208	Jim Bunning	R	KY-04	January 3, 1987	4th term	
209	Ben Cardin	D	MD-03	January 3, 1987	4th term	
210	Peter DeFazio	D	OR-04	January 3, 1987	4th term	
211	Mike Espy	D	MS-02	January 3, 1987	4th term	Resigned on January 22, 1993.
212	Floyd Flake	D	NY-06	January 3, 1987	4th term	
213	Elton Gallegly	R	CA-23	January 3, 1987	4th term	
214	Fred Grandy	R	IA-05	January 3, 1987	4th term	Left the House in 1995.
215	Dennis Hastert	R	IL-14	January 3, 1987	4th term	
216	Jimmy Hayes	D	LA-07	January 3, 1987	4th term	
217	Joel Hefley	R	CO-05	January 3, 1987	4th term	
218	Wally Herger	R	CA-02	January 3, 1987	4th term	
219	George Hochbrueckner	D	NY-01	January 3, 1987	4th term	Left the House in 1995.
220	Amo Houghton	R	NY-31	January 3, 1987	4th term	
221	Jim Inhofe	R	OK-01	January 3, 1987	4th term	Resigned on November 15, 1994.
222	Tim Johnson	D	SD	January 3, 1987	4th term	
223	Joseph Kennedy II	D	MA-08	January 3, 1987	4th term	
224	Jon Kyl	R	AZ-04	January 3, 1987	4th term	Left the House in 1995.
225	Martin Lancaster	D	NC-03	January 3, 1987	4th term	Left the House in 1995.
226	John Lewis	D	GA-05	January 3, 1987	4th term	
227	Kweisi Mfume	D	MD-07	January 3, 1987	4th term	
228	Connie Morella	R	MD-08	January 3, 1987	4th term	
229	Owen Pickett	D	VA-02	January 3, 1987	4th term	
230	Arthur Ravenel	R	SC-01	January 3, 1987	4th term	Left the House in 1995.
231	Tom Sawyer	D	OH-14	January 3, 1987	4th term	
232	David Skaggs	D	CO-02	January 3, 1987	4th term	
233	Louise Slaughter	D	NY-28	January 3, 1987	4th term	
234	David Price	D	NC-04	January 3, 1987	4th term	Left the House in 1995.
235	Lamar Smith	R	TX-21	January 3, 1987	4th term	
236	Fred Upton	R	MI-06	January 3, 1987	4th term	
237	Curt Weldon	R	PA-07	January 3, 1987	4th term	
238	Nancy Pelosi	D	CA-08	June 2, 1987	4th term	
239	Chris Shays	R	CT-4	August 18, 1987	4th term	
240	Bob Clement	D	TN-05	January 19, 1988	4th term	
241	Jim McCrery	R	LA-05	April 16, 1988	4th term	
242	Lewis Payne	D	VA-05	June 14, 1988	4th term	
243	Jerry Costello	D	IL-12	August 9, 1988	4th term	
244	Jimmy Duncan	R	TN-02	November 8, 1988	4th term	
245	Frank Pallone	D	NJ-06	November 8, 1988	4th term	
246	Mel Hancock	R	MO-07	January 3, 1989	3rd term	
247	Christopher Cox	R	CA-47	January 3, 1989	3rd term	
248	Eliot Engel	D	NY-17	January 3, 1989	3rd term	
249	Paul Gillmor	R	OH-05	January 3, 1989	3rd term	
250	Porter Goss	R	FL-14	January 3, 1989	3rd term	
251	Peter Hoagland	D	NE-02	January 3, 1989	3rd term	Left the House in 1995.
252	Harry Johnston	D	FL-19	January 3, 1989	3rd term	
253	Greg Laughlin	D	TX-14	January 3, 1989	3rd term	
254	Nita Lowey	D	NY-18	January 3, 1989	3rd term	
255	Ronald Machtley	R	RI-01	January 3, 1989	3rd term	Left the House in 1995.
256	Jim McDermott	D	WA-07	January 3, 1989	3rd term	
257	Michael McNulty	D	NY-21	January 3, 1989	3rd term	
258	Richard Neal	D	MA-02	January 3, 1989	3rd term	
259	Mike Parker	D	MS-04	January 3, 1989	3rd term	
260	Bill Paxon	R	NY-27	January 3, 1989	3rd term	
261	Donald Payne	D	NJ-10	January 3, 1989	3rd term	
262	Glenn Poshard	D	IL-19	January 3, 1989	3rd term	
263	Dana Rohrabacher	R	CA-45	January 3, 1989	3rd term	
264	George Sangmeister	D	IL-11	January 3, 1989	3rd term	Left the House in 1995.
265	Bill Sarpalius	D	TX-13	January 3, 1989	3rd term	Left the House in 1995.
266	Steven Schiff	R	NM-01	January 3, 1989	3rd term	
267	Cliff Stearns	R	FL-06	January 3, 1989	3rd term	
268	John Tanner	D	TN-08	January 3, 1989	3rd term	
269	Jolene Unsoeld	D	WA-03	January 3, 1989	3rd term	Left the House in 1995.
270	James Walsh	R	NY-25	January 3, 1989	3rd term	
271	Jill Long	D	IN-04	March 28, 1989	3rd term	Left the House in 1995.
272	Glen Browder	D	AL-03	April 4, 1989	3rd term	
273	Craig Thomas	R	WY	April 26, 1989	3rd term	Left the House in 1995.
274	Ileana Ros-Lehtinen	R	FL-18	August 29, 1989	3rd term	
275	Gary Condit	D	CA-18	September 12, 1989	3rd term	
276	Pete Geren	D	TX-12	September 12, 1989	3rd term	
277	Gene Taylor	D	MS-05	October 17, 1989	3rd term	
278	Craig Washington	D	TX-18	December 9, 1989	3rd term	Left the House in 1995.
279	Susan Molinari	R	NY-13	March 20, 1990	3rd term	
280	José Serrano	D	NY-16	March 20, 1990	3rd term	
281	Patsy Mink	D	HI-02	September 22, 1990; Previous service, 1965–1977.	9th term*	
282	Rob Andrews	D	NJ-01	November 6, 1990	3rd term	
283	Neil Abercrombie	D	HI-01	January 3, 1991; Previous service, 1986–1987.	3rd term*	
284	Wayne Allard	R	CO-04	January 3, 1991	2nd term	
285	Tom Andrews	D	ME-01	January 3, 1991	2nd term	Left the House in 1995.
286	Jim Bacchus	D	FL-15	January 3, 1991	2nd term	Left the House in 1995.
287	Bill Barrett	R	NE-03	January 3, 1991	2nd term	
288	John Boehner	R	OH-08	January 3, 1991	2nd term	
289	Bill Brewster	D	OK-03	January 3, 1991	2nd term	
290	Barbara-Rose Collins	D	MI-15	January 3, 1991	2nd term	
291	Dave Camp	R	MI-04	January 3, 1991	2nd term	
292	Bud Cramer	D	AL-05	January 3, 1991	2nd term	
293	Duke Cunningham	R	CA-50	January 3, 1991	2nd term	
294	Rosa DeLauro	D	CT-03	January 3, 1991	2nd term	
295	John Doolittle	R	CA-04	January 3, 1991	2nd term	
296	Cal Dooley	D	CA-20	January 3, 1991	2nd term	
297	Chet Edwards	D	TX-11	January 3, 1991	2nd term	
298	Gary Franks	R	CT-05	January 3, 1991	2nd term	
299	Wayne Gilchrest	R	MD-01	January 3, 1991	2nd term	
300	Dave Hobson	R	OH-07	January 3, 1991	2nd term	
301	William Jefferson	D	LA-02	January 3, 1991	2nd term	
302	Scott Klug	R	WI-02	January 3, 1991	2nd term	
303	Mike Kopetski	D	OR-05	January 3, 1991	2nd term	Left the House in 1995.
304	Larry LaRocco	D	ID-01	January 3, 1991	2nd term	Left the House in 1995.
305	Jim Moran	D	VA-08	January 3, 1991	2nd term	
306	Jim Nussle	R	IA-02	January 3, 1991	2nd term	
307	Bill Orton	D	UT-03	January 3, 1991	2nd term	
308	Collin Peterson	D	MN-07	January 3, 1991	2nd term	
309	Pete Peterson	D	FL-02	January 3, 1991	2nd term	
310	Jim Ramstad	R	MN-03	January 3, 1991	2nd term	
311	Jack Reed	D	RI-02	January 3, 1991	2nd term	
312	Tim Roemer	D	IN-03	January 3, 1991	2nd term	
313	Bernie Sanders	I	VT	January 3, 1991	2nd term	
314	Rick Santorum	R	PA-18	January 3, 1991	2nd term	Left the House in 1995.
315	Richard Swett	D	NH-02	January 3, 1991	2nd term	Left the House in 1995.
316	Charles Taylor	R	NC-11	January 3, 1991	2nd term	
317	Ray Thornton	D	AR-02	January 3, 1991; Previous service, 1973–1979.	5th term*	
318	Maxine Waters	D	CA-35	January 3, 1991	2nd term	
319	Bill Zeliff	R	NH-01	January 3, 1991	2nd term	
320	Dick Zimmer	R	NJ-12	January 3, 1991	2nd term	
321	Sam Johnson	R	TX-03	May 8, 1991	2nd term	
322	John Olver	D	MA-01	June 18, 1991	2nd term	
323	Tom Ewing	R	IL-15	July 2, 1991	2nd term	
324	Ed Pastor	D	AZ-02	October 3, 1991	2nd term	
325	Lucien Blackwell	D	PA-02	November 5, 1991	2nd term	Left the House in 1995.
326	Eva Clayton	D	NC-01	November 3, 1992	2nd term	
327	Jerry Nadler	D	NY-08	November 3, 1992	2nd term	
328	Spencer Bachus	R	AL-06	January 3, 1993	1st term	
329	Bill Baker	R	CA-10	January 3, 1993	1st term	
330	James Barcia	D	MI-05	January 3, 1993	1st term	
331	Tom Barlow	D	KY-01	January 3, 1993	1st term	Left the House in 1995.
332	Tom Barrett	D	WI-05	January 3, 1993	1st term	
333	Roscoe Bartlett	R	MD-06	January 3, 1993	1st term	
334	Xavier Becerra	D	CA-30	January 3, 1993	1st term	
335	Scotty Baesler	D	KY-06	January 3, 1993	1st term	
336	Sanford Bishop	D	GA-02	January 3, 1993	1st term	
337	Peter Blute	R	MA-03	January 3, 1993	1st term	
338	Henry Bonilla	R	TX-23	January 3, 1993	1st term	
339	Corrine Brown	D	FL-03	January 3, 1993	1st term	
340	Sherrod Brown	D	OH-13	January 3, 1993	1st term	
341	Steve Buyer	R	IN-05	January 3, 1993	1st term	
342	Leslie Byrne	D	VA-11	January 3, 1993	1st term	Left the House in 1995.
343	Ken Calvert	R	CA-43	January 3, 1993	1st term	
344	Charles Canady	R	FL-12	January 3, 1993	1st term	
345	Maria Cantwell	D	WA-01	January 3, 1993	1st term	Left the House in 1995.
346	Mike Castle	R	DE	January 3, 1993	1st term	
347	Jim Clyburn	D	SC-06	January 3, 1993	1st term	
348	Mac Collins	R	GA-03	January 3, 1993	1st term	
349	Sam Coppersmith	D	AZ-01	January 3, 1993	1st term	Left the House in 1995.
350	Mike Crapo	R	ID-02	January 3, 1993	1st term	
351	Pat Danner	D	MO-06	January 3, 1993	1st term	
352	Nathan Deal	D	GA-09	January 3, 1993	1st term	
353	Peter Deutsch	D	FL-20	January 3, 1993	1st term	
354	Lincoln Díaz-Balart	R	FL-21	January 3, 1993	1st term	
355	Jay Dickey	D	AR-04	January 3, 1993	1st term	
356	Jennifer Dunn	R	WA-08	January 3, 1993	1st term	
357	Karan English	D	AZ-06	January 3, 1993	1st term	Left the House in 1995.
358	Anna Eshoo	D	CA-14	January 3, 1993	1st term	
359	Terry Everett	R	AL-02	January 3, 1993	1st term	
360	Cleo Fields	D	LA-04	January 3, 1993	1st term	
361	Bob Filner	D	CA-51	January 3, 1993	1st term	
362	Eric Fingerhut	D	OH-19	January 3, 1993	1st term	Left the House in 1995.
363	Tillie Fowler	R	FL-04	January 3, 1993	1st term	
364	Bob Franks	R	NJ-07	January 3, 1993	1st term	
365	Elizabeth Furse	D	OR-01	January 3, 1993	1st term	
366	Bob Goodlatte	R	VA-06	January 3, 1993	1st term	
367	Rod Grams	R	MN-06	January 3, 1993	1st term	Left the House in 1995 (became Senator).
368	Gene Green	D	TX-29	January 3, 1993	1st term	
369	Jim Greenwood	R	PA-08	January 3, 1993	1st term	
370	Luis Gutiérrez	D	IL-04	January 3, 1993	1st term	
371	Daniel Hamburg	D	CA-01	January 3, 1993	1st term	Left the House in 1995.
372	Jane Harman	D	CA-36	January 3, 1993	1st term	
373	Alcee Hastings	D	FL-23	January 3, 1993	1st term	
374	Earl Hilliard	D	AL-07	January 3, 1993	1st term	
375	Maurice Hinchey	D	NY-26	January 3, 1993	1st term	
376	Pete Hoekstra	R	MI-02	January 3, 1993	1st term	
377	Martin Hoke	R	OH-10	January 3, 1993	1st term	
378	Tim Holden	D	PA-06	January 3, 1993	1st term	
379	Steve Horn	R	CA-38	January 3, 1993	1st term	
380	Michael Huffington	R	CA-22	January 3, 1993	1st term	Left the House in 1995.
381	Bob Inglis	R	SC-04	January 3, 1993	1st term	
382	Jay Inslee	D	WA-04	January 3, 1993	1st term	Left the House in 1995.
383	Ernest Istook	R	OK-05	January 3, 1993	1st term	
384	Eddie Bernice Johnson	D	TX-30	January 3, 1993	1st term	
385	Tim Hutchinson	R	AR-03	January 3, 1993	1st term	
386	Don Johnson	D	GA-10	January 3, 1993	1st term	Left the House in 1995.
387	Jay Kim	R	CA-41	January 3, 1993	1st term	
388	Peter King	R	NY-03	January 3, 1993	1st term	
389	Jack Kingston	R	GA-01	January 3, 1993	1st term	
390	Herbert Klein	D	NJ-08	January 3, 1993	1st term	Left the House in 1995.
391	Ron Klink	D	PA-04	January 3, 1993	1st term	
392	Joe Knollenberg	R	MI-11	January 3, 1993	1st term	
393	Mike Kreidler	D	WA-09	January 3, 1993	1st term	Left the House in 1995.
394	Rick Lazio	R	NY-02	January 3, 1993	1st term	
395	David Levy	R	NY-04	January 3, 1993	1st term	Left the House in 1995.
396	Blanche Lincoln	D	AR-01	January 3, 1993	1st term	
397	John Linder	R	GA-11	January 3, 1993	1st term	
398	Carolyn Maloney	D	NY-14	January 3, 1993	1st term	
399	David Mann	D	OH-01	January 3, 1993	1st term	Left the House in 1995.
400	Don Manzullo	R	IL-16	January 3, 1993	1st term	
401	Marjorie Margolies-Mezvinsky	D	PA-13	January 3, 1993	1st term	Left the House in 1995.
402	Paul McHale	D	PA-15	January 3, 1993	1st term	
403	John McHugh	R	NY-24	January 3, 1993	1st term	
404	Scott McInnis	R	CO-03	January 3, 1993	1st term	
405	Buck McKeon	R	CA-25	January 3, 1993	1st term	
406	Cynthia McKinney	D	GA-04	January 3, 1993	1st term	
407	Marty Meehan	D	MA-05	January 3, 1993	1st term	
408	Carrie Meek	D	FL-17	January 3, 1993	1st term	
409	Bob Menendez	D	NJ-13	January 3, 1993	1st term	
410	John Mica	R	FL-07	January 3, 1993	1st term	
411	Dan Miller	R	FL-13	January 3, 1993	1st term	
412	David Minge	D	MN-02	January 3, 1993	1st term	
413	Richard Pombo	R	CA-11	January 3, 1993	1st term	
414	Earl Pomeroy	D	ND	January 3, 1993	1st term	
415	Deborah Pryce	R	OH-15	January 3, 1993	1st term	
416	Jack Quinn	R	NY-30	January 3, 1993	1st term	
417	Mel Reynolds	D	IL-02	January 3, 1993	1st term	
418	Lucille Roybal-Allard	D	CA-33	January 3, 1993	1st term	
419	Ed Royce	R	CA-39	January 3, 1993	1st term	
420	Bobby Rush	D	IL-01	January 3, 1993	1st term	
421	Bobby Scott	D	VA-03	January 3, 1993	1st term	
422	Lynn Schenk	D	CA-49	January 3, 1993	1st term	Left the House in 1995.
423	Karen Shepherd	D	UT-02	January 3, 1993	1st term	Left the House in 1995.
424	Nick Smith	R	MI-07	January 3, 1993	1st term	
425	Ted Strickland	D	OH-06	January 3, 1993	1st term	Left the House in 1995.
426	Bart Stupak	D	MI-01	January 3, 1993	1st term	
427	Frank Tejeda	D	TX-28	January 3, 1993	1st term	
428	Jim Talent	R	MO-02	January 3, 1993	1st term	
429	Karen Thurman	D	FL-05	January 3, 1993	1st term	
430	Peter Torkildsen	R	MA-06	January 3, 1993	1st term	
431	Walter Tucker	D	CA-37	January 3, 1993	1st term	
432	Nydia Velázquez	D	NY-12	January 3, 1993	1st term	
433	Mel Watt	D	NC-12	January 3, 1993	1st term	
434	Lynn Woolsey	D	CA-06	January 3, 1993	1st term	
435	Albert Wynn	D	MD-04	January 3, 1993	1st term	
	Bennie Thompson	D	MS-02	April 13, 1993	1st term	
	Peter Barca	D	WI-01	May 4, 1993	1st term	Left the House in 1995.
	Rob Portman	R	OH-02	May 4, 1993	1st term	
	Sam Farr	D	CA-17	June 8, 1993	1st term	
	Vern Ehlers	R	MI-03	December 7, 1993	1st term	
	Frank Lucas	R	OK-06	May 10, 1994	1st term	
	Ron Lewis	R	KY-02	May 24, 1994	1st term	
	Steve Largent	R	OK-01	November 29, 1994	1st term	

== Delegates ==
Rank	Delegate	Party	District	Seniority date (Previous service, if any)	No.# of term(s)	Notes
1	Ron de Lugo	D	VI	January 3, 1981; Previous service, 1973–1979.	10th term*	
2	Eni Faleomavaega	D	AS	January 3, 1989	3rd term	
3	Eleanor Holmes Norton	D	DC	January 3, 1991	2nd term	
4	Carlos Romero Barceló	D	PR	January 3, 1993	1st term	
5	Robert A. Underwood	D	GU	January 3, 1993	1st term	

== See also ==
- 103rd United States Congress
- List of United States congressional districts
- List of United States senators in the 103rd Congress
