= Charles Williams (Florida politician) =

American politician (born 1939)

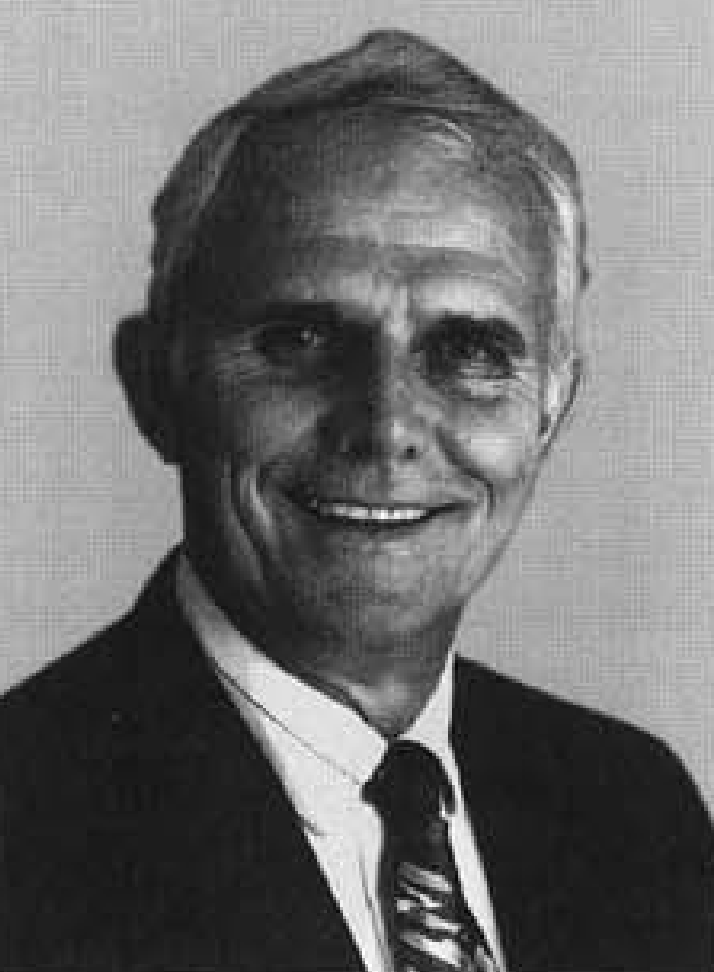

Member of the Florida Senate from the 4th district
- In office November 3, 1992 – November 3, 1998
- Preceded by: Sherry Walker (redistricting)
- Succeeded by: Richard Mitchell

Personal details
- Born: March 25, 1939 (age 87) Gilchrist County, Florida
- Party: Democratic
- Spouse: Marilyn Jones
- Children: 3
- Education: Florida State University (B.S.)
- Occupation: Real estate agent, insurance agent, farmer

Charles D. Williams (born March 25, 1939) is a Democratic politician from Florida who served as a member of the Florida Senate from the 4th district from 1992 to 1998.

== Early life ==
Williams was born in Gilchrist County, Florida, in 1939. He attended Florida State University, graduating with his bachelor's degree in business administration in 1961. He worked as a real estate agent, insurance agent, and farmer, and was elected to the Suwannee County Commission in 1988.

== Florida Senate ==
In 1992, following redistricting, Williams ran for the Florida Senate from the newly created 4th district, parts of which were represented by Karen Thurman and Sherry Walker. The district, which was as large as Connecticut, stretched from Ocala to Tallahassee and the northern Jacksonville suburbs, and Williams accused Walker of "rigging" the district's lines to prevent him from challenging her. However, Walker ultimately declined to seek re-election, and Williams faced attorney Bob Boyd, Levy County Superintendent Will Irby, sod contractor Lamar Lee, and former State House Speaker Donald L. Tucker in the Democratic primary. Williams narrowly placed first in the primary election, winning 24 percent of the vote to Tucker's 21 percent, and they advanced to a runoff election. Williams defeated Tucker, winning the runoff election, 54–46 percent. Williams faced no opponents in the general election and won by default.

In his first term, Williams attracted controversy for proposing legislation to allow student-led prayers at high school graduation ceremonies, opposing Governor Lawton Chiles's health care reform efforts, and voting against compensation for survivors of the Rosewood massacre. He ran for re-election in 1994, and was challenged in the primary by retired pilot Bob Glover, retired jai alai player Glenn Jones, and Lamar Lee. Williams narrowly avoided a runoff election, receiving 51 percent of the vote to Glover's 22 percent, Jones's 16 percent, and Lee's 11 percent. In the general election, he was challenged by Republican George Onett, a disbarred lawyer and horse breeder. Williams defeated Onett in a landslide, winning 61 percent of the vote to Onett's 39 percent.

Williams sought a third term in 1998, and was challenged by Jasper businessman Richard Mitchell, a little-known candidate, in the Democratic primary. Mitchell, who was endorsed by the AFL-CIO and supported by trial lawyers' associations, narrowly defeated Williams, winning 53 percent of the vote to Williams's 47 percent.
