= Hernando Beach, Florida =

Census-designated area in Hernando County Florida, United States

- Census-designated place
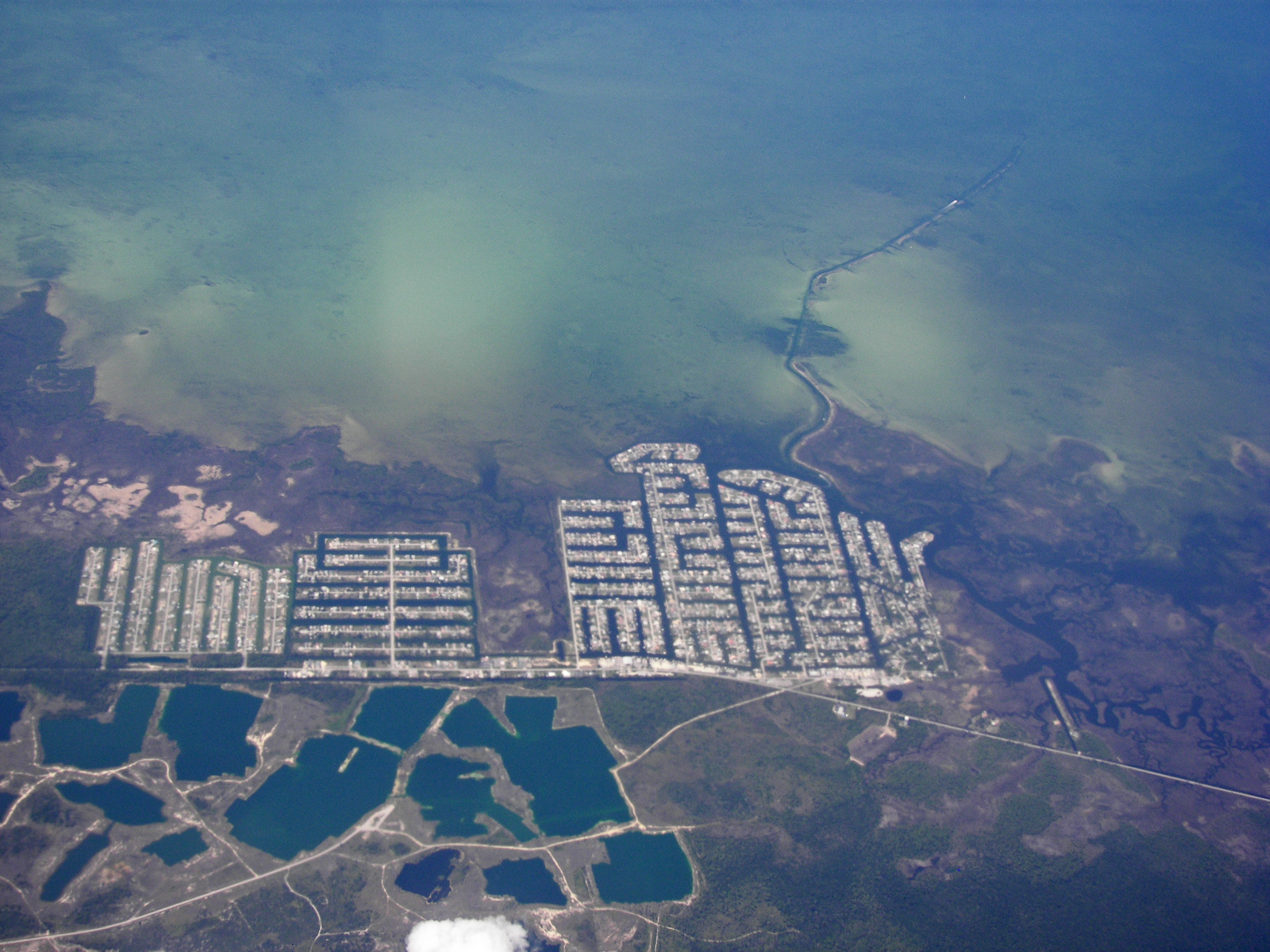
- Aerial view

- Location in Hernando County and the state of Florida
- Coordinates: 28°29′18″N 82°39′31″W
- Country: United States
- State: Florida
- County: Hernando

Area
  - Total: 4.88 sq mi (12.64 km^{2})
  - Land: 3.55 sq mi (9.19 km^{2})
  - Water: 1.33 sq mi (3.45 km^{2})
- Elevation: 3 ft (0.91 m)

Population (2020)
  - Total: 2,452
  - Density: 691.3/sq mi (266.91/km^{2})
- Time zone: UTC-5 (Eastern (EST))
  - Summer (DST): UTC-4 (EDT)
- ZIP code: 34607
- Area code: 352
- FIPS code: 12-29437
- GNIS feature ID: 2402579

Hernando Beach is a census-designated place (CDP) in Hernando County, Florida, United States. As of the 2020 census, Hernando Beach had a population of 2,452.

== Geography ==
The community is in southwestern Hernando County, along the Gulf of Mexico. Shoal Line Boulevard forms the eastern edge of the CDP, and the community extends from Osowaw Boulevard in the south to Minnow Creek in the north. The southern end of the CDP is 1.5 miles (2.4 km) west of U.S. Route 19 at Timber Pines; the northern end is 2.5 miles (4.0 km) southwest of the community of Weeki Wachee Gardens and 7 miles (11 km) west of U.S. Route 19 at Weeki Wachee Springs.

According to the U.S. Census Bureau, the Hernando Beach CDP has a total area of 4.1 square miles (10.5 km^{2}), of which 3.5 square miles (9.1 km^{2}) are land and 0.54 square miles (1.4 km^{2}), or 13.38%, are water.

== History ==
Hernando Beach, situated northwest of Tampa, FL, is a picturesque waterfront canal community. Developed by Charlie Sasser between 1959 and 1965, the area's unique geography was shaped by earth sourced from coastal mining operations and extensive dredging efforts. The north section of Hernando Beach boasts deep and wide canals leading directly to the Gulf of Mexico.

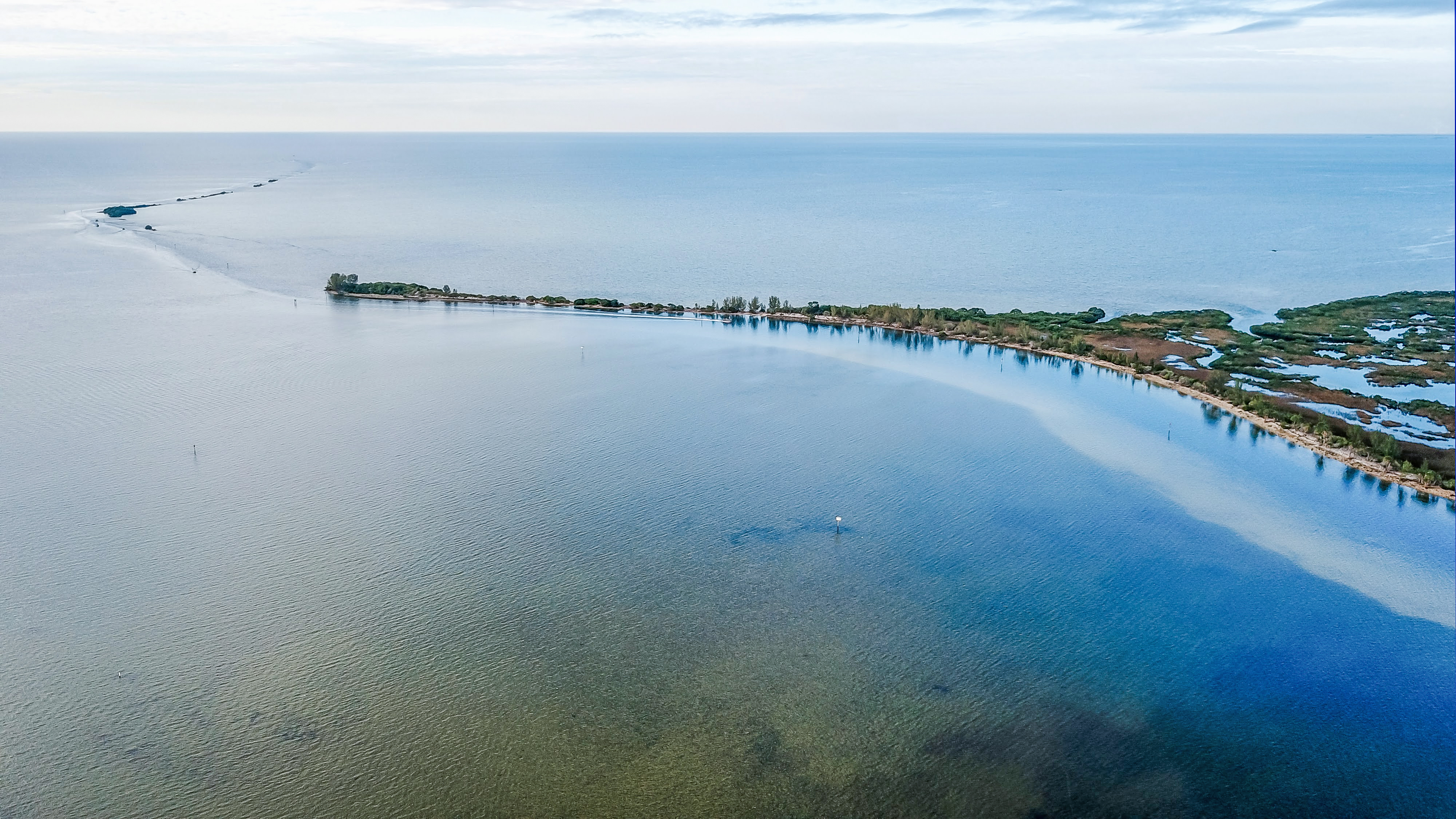
Aerial Photo of the Flats in Hernando Beach

However, the area's growth faced regulatory challenges when wetland development restrictions were imposed in 1971, halting further expansion. This led to a legal dispute between Sasser, the state authorities, and the Hernando County Commission, resulting in the preservation of Hernando Beach's natural state.

== Demographics ==
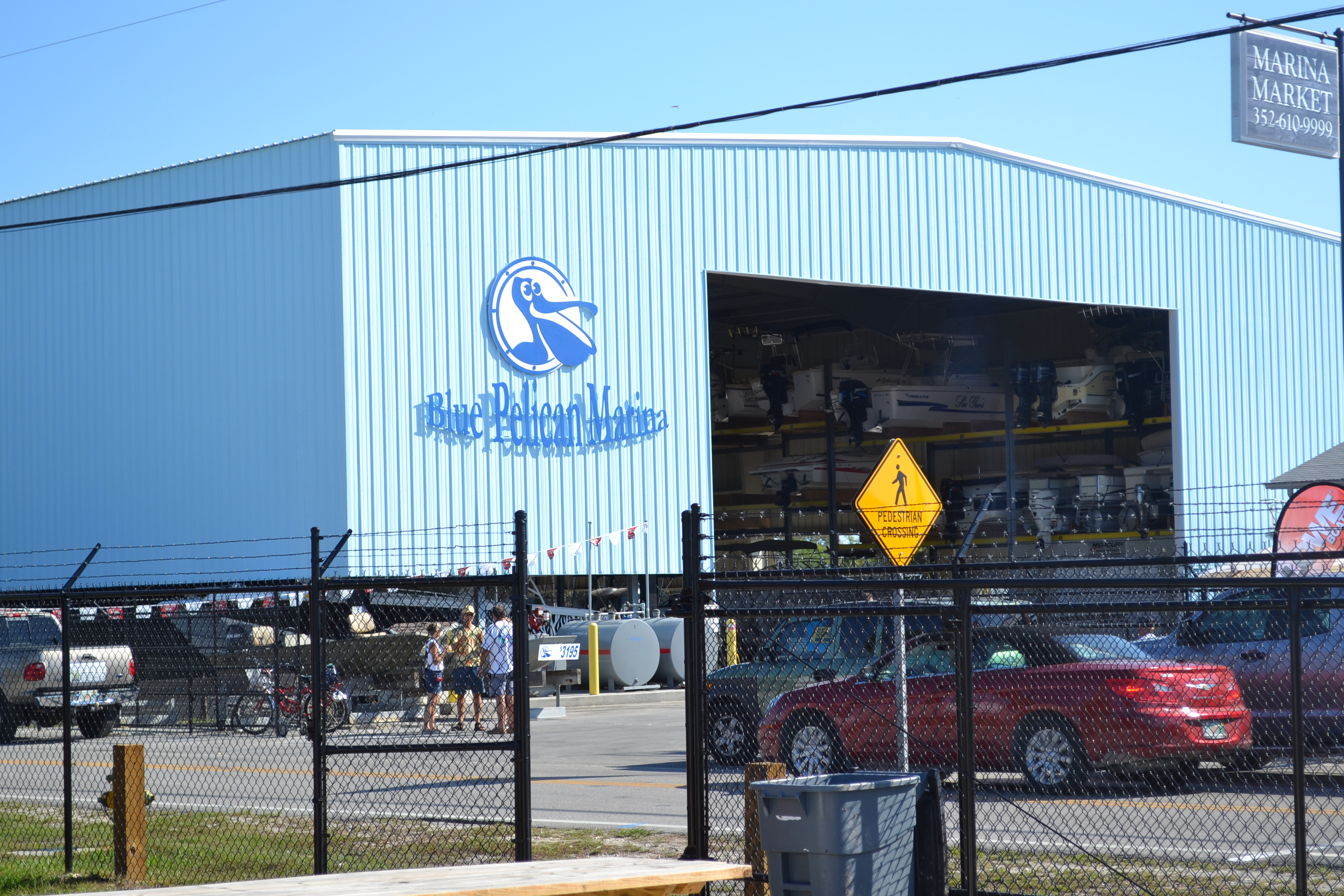
Blue Pelican Marina

Historical population
Census	Pop.	Note	%±
1990	1,767		—
2000	2,185		23.7%
2010	2,299		5.2%
2020	2,452		6.7%

=== 2020 census ===
As of the 2020 census, Hernando Beach had a population of 2,452. The median age was 60.3 years. 8.6% of residents were under the age of 18 and 37.1% of residents were 65 years of age or older. For every 100 females there were 95.1 males, and for every 100 females age 18 and over there were 96.0 males age 18 and over.

0.0% of residents lived in urban areas, while 100.0% lived in rural areas.

There were 1,145 households in Hernando Beach, of which 11.6% had children under the age of 18 living in them. Of all households, 61.4% were married-couple households, 19.0% were households with a male householder and no spouse or partner present, and 14.1% were households with a female householder and no spouse or partner present. About 26.0% of all households were made up of individuals and 14.4% had someone living alone who was 65 years of age or older.

There were 1,502 housing units, of which 23.8% were vacant. The homeowner vacancy rate was 5.1% and the rental vacancy rate was 24.1%.

Racial composition as of the 2020 census
Race	Number	Percent
White	2,226	90.8%
Black or African American	12	0.5%
American Indian and Alaska Native	9	0.4%
Asian	10	0.4%
Native Hawaiian and Other Pacific Islander	0	0.0%
Some other race	25	1.0%
Two or more races	170	6.9%
Hispanic or Latino (of any race)	139	5.7%

=== 2000 census ===
As of the 2000 census, there were 2,185 people, 975 households, and 727 families residing in the CDP. The population density was 558.1 inhabitants per square mile (215.5/km^{2}). There were 1,182 housing units at an average density of 301.9 per square mile (116.6/km^{2}). The racial makeup of the CDP was 97.71% White, 0.23% African American, 0.41% Native American, 0.55% Asian, 0.18% from other races, and 0.92% from two or more races. Hispanic or Latino of any race were 2.56% of the population.

There were 975 households, out of which 16.3% had children under the age of 18 living with them, 65.9% were married couples living together, 5.5% had a female householder with no husband present, and 25.4% were non-families. 19.5% of all households were made up of individuals, and 9.0% had someone living alone who was 65 years of age or older. The average household size was 2.24 and the average family size was 2.52.

In the CDP, the population was spread out, with 13.6% under the age of 18, 4.7% from 18 to 24, 16.7% from 25 to 44, 38.8% from 45 to 64, and 26.3% who were 65 years of age or older. The median age was 53 years. For every 100 females, there were 98.3 males. For every 100 females age 18 and over, there were 98.3 males.

The median income for a household in the CDP was $47,014, and the median income for a family was $49,605. Males had a median income of $47,093 versus $21,630 for females. The per capita income for the CDP was $25,856. About 4.2% of families and 6.6% of the population were below the poverty line, including none of those under age 18 and 10.3% of those age 65 or over.

== Law enforcement ==
The Hernando County Sheriff's Office is in charge of law enforcement in Hernando Beach. Their Marine Unit Station headquarters is on Shoal Line Boulevard in Hernando Beach. There is also the Crime Watch in Hernando Beach, supervised by the County Sheriff's office. The United States Coast Guard Auxiliary has their Hernando County Unit, Division 15, Flotilla 8, on Shoal Line as well. Flotilla 8 is in charge of all auxiliary maritime functions for Hernando County, as well as public outreach.

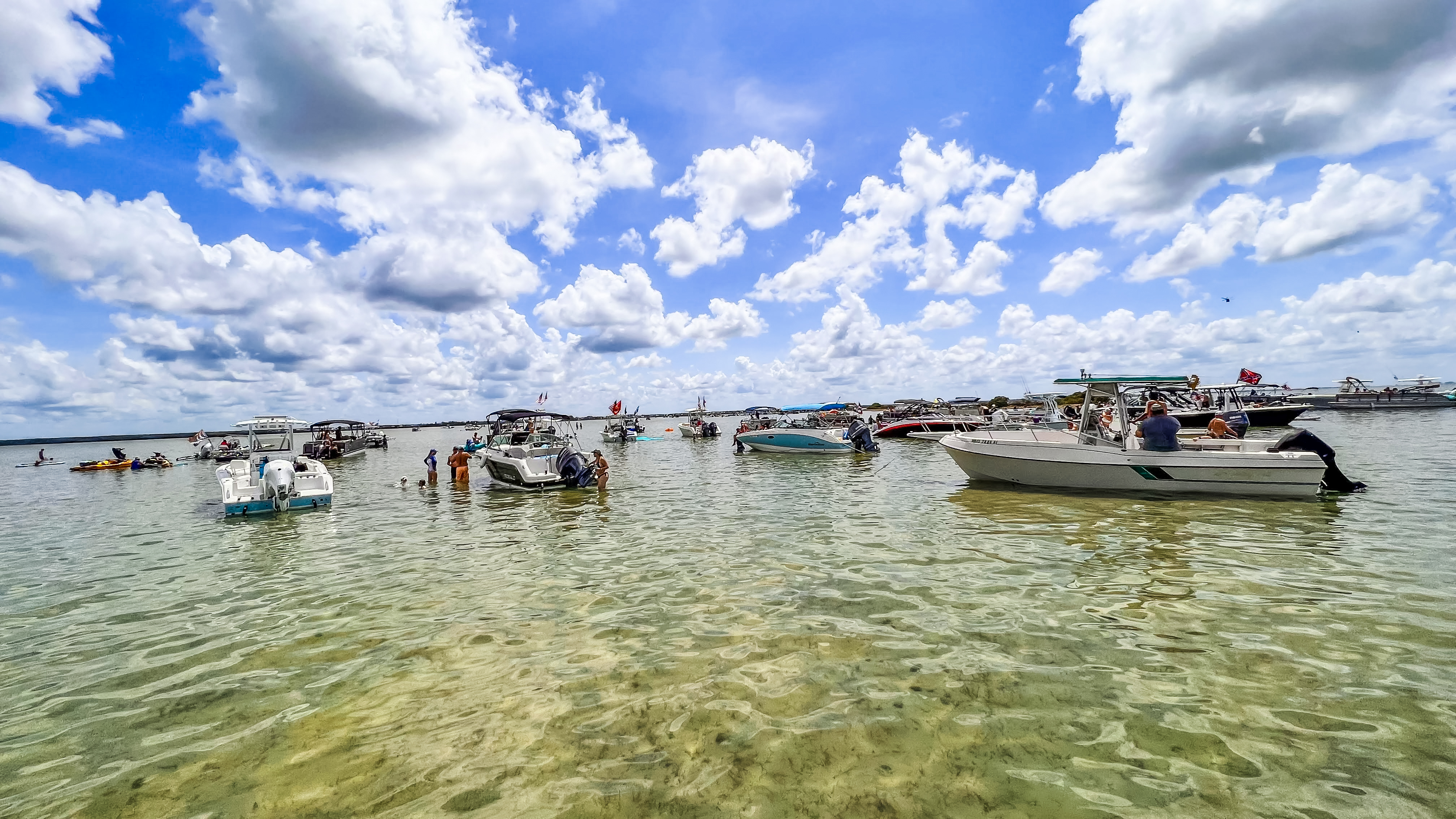
Picture of boaters in the flats in Hernando Beach in 2022

== The Flats ==
Situated just beyond the canal system, these shallow waters offer a haven for boaters, kayakers, paddleboarders, and nature enthusiasts.

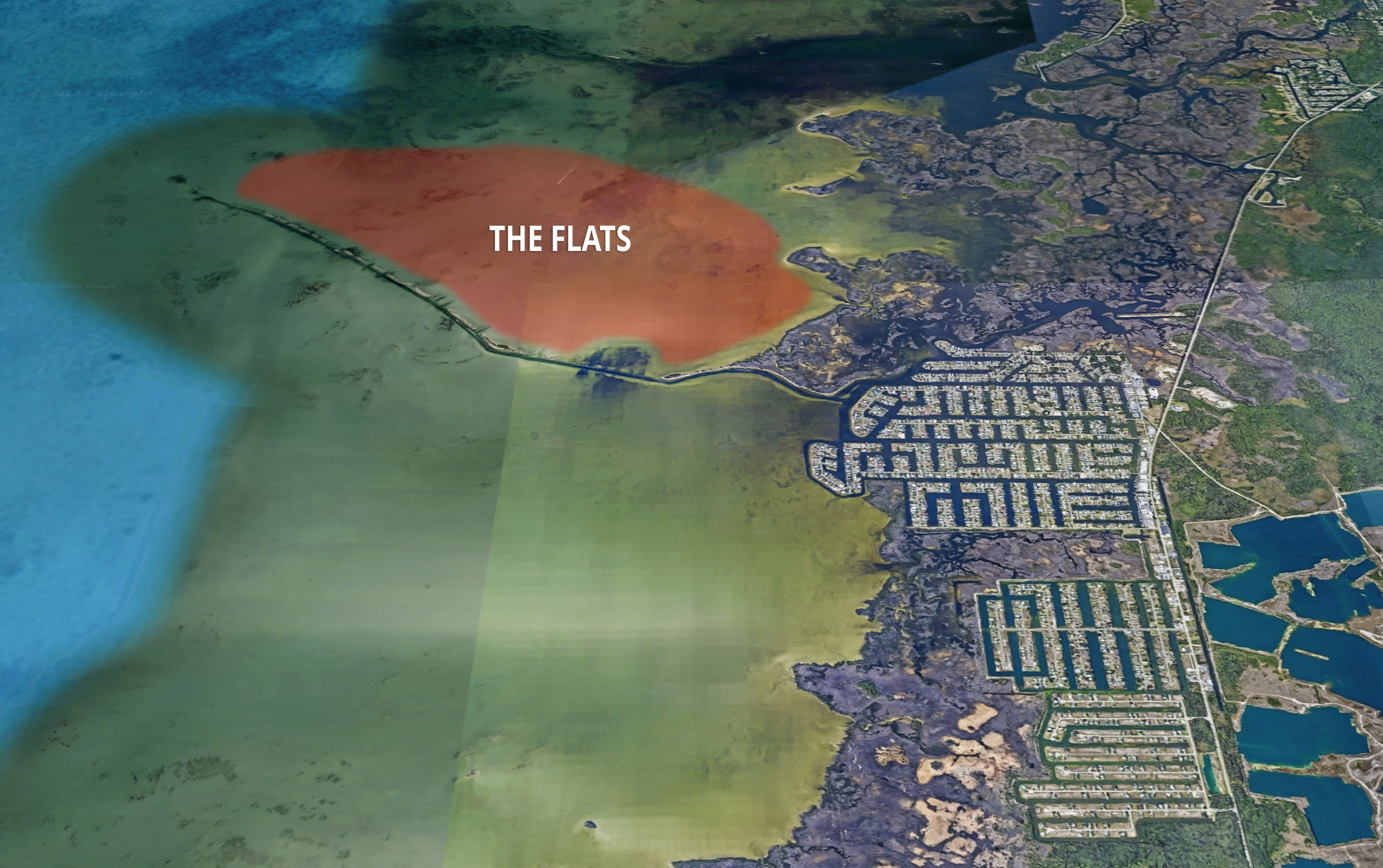
Map of the Flats in Hernando Beach

== Hurricanes ==
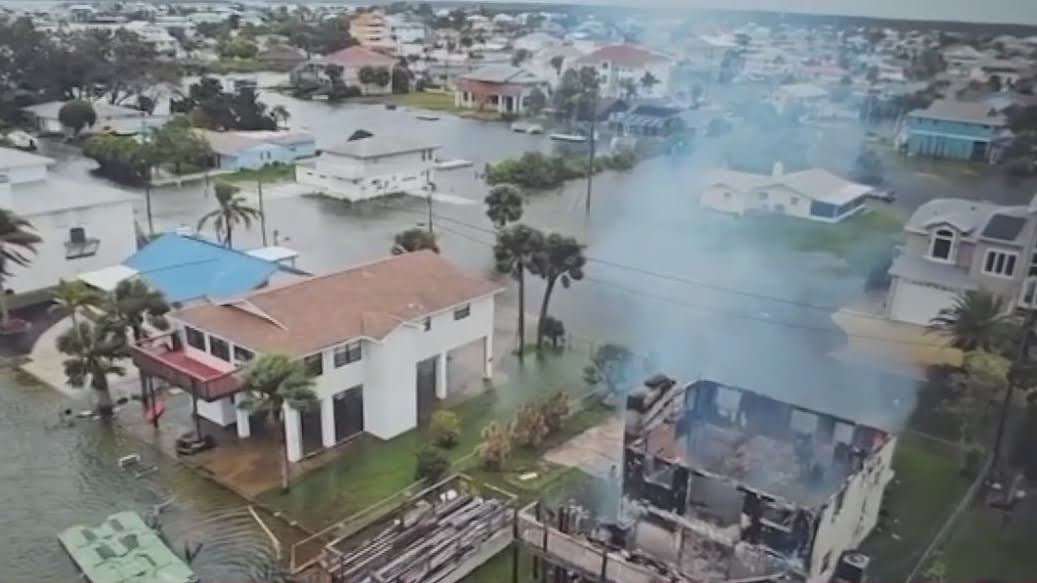
Hurricane Idalia in Hernando Beach. August 30, 2023

Hurricane Idalia 2023: Idalia was a Category 4 hurricane that hit the Big Bend region of Florida on August 30. This devastating storm resulted in significant damage to areas in the southeastern United States, specifically Northern Florida, and caused the loss of businesses and homes. It emerged as the tenth tropical storm, third hurricane, and second major hurricane of the 2023 Atlantic hurricane season as it formed from a low-pressure area that crossed Central America from the Pacific Ocean. The system strengthened into a tropical depression on August 26, 2023. Upon traversing the Gulf of Mexico, it underwent rapid intensification, briefly becoming a Category 4 hurricane before making landfall in Florida as a Category 3 hurricane. It remained a hurricane as it advanced to Southeast Georgia, later transforming into a post-tropical cyclone that same day. Idalia caused tremendous damage across Florida and southeastern Georgia, resulting in four fatalities and thousands of damaged or destroyed structures.

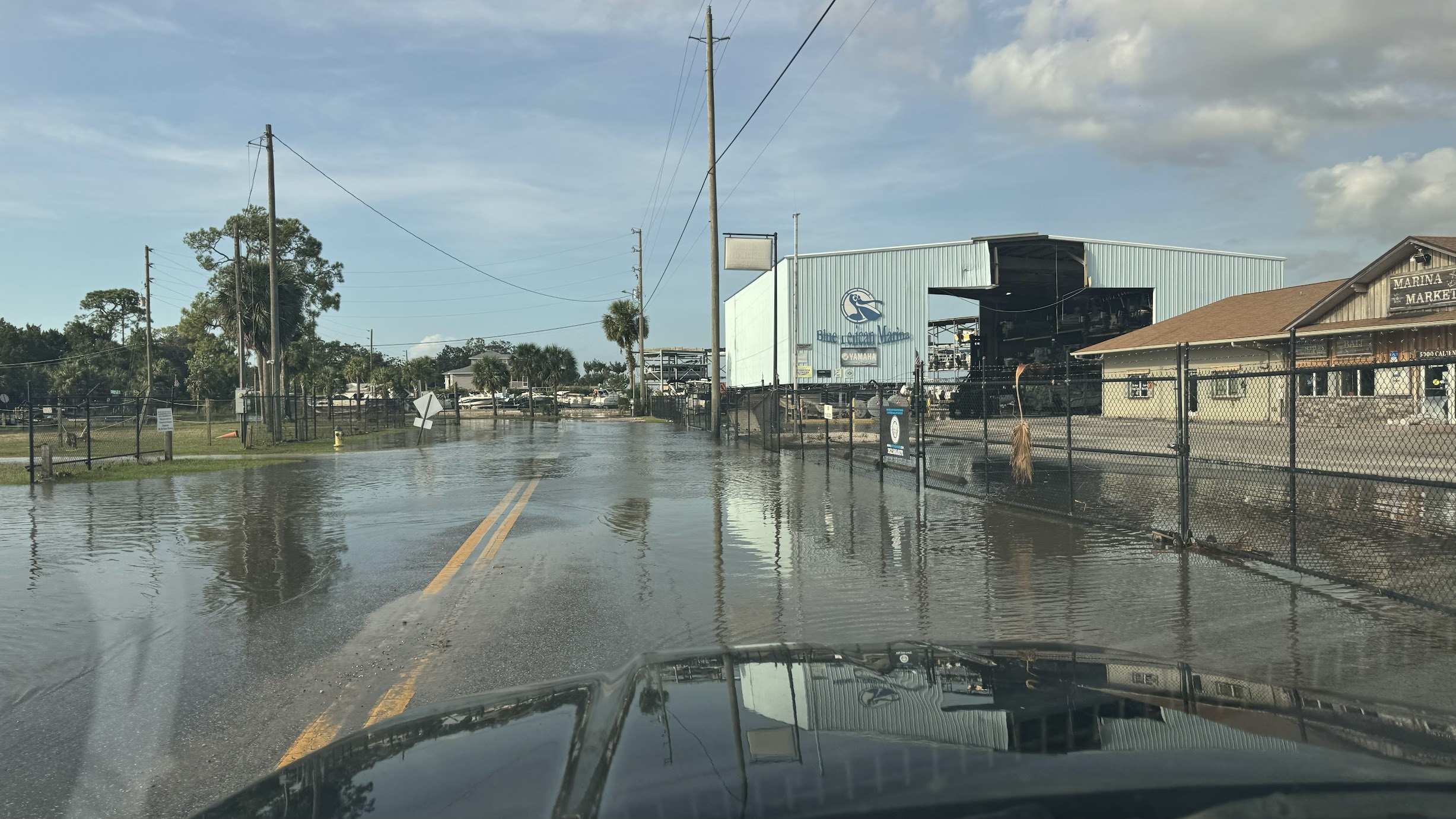
Aftermath of Hurricane Helene going towards the Hernando Beach Boat Ramp

Hurricane Helene 2024: Hurricane Helene made a significant impact on Hernando Beach, FL on September 26, 2024, leaving behind considerable damage and flooding. As the storm swept through, it brought rain, and a storm surge that led to widespread flooding. Homes along the coast suffered damage, with some areas experiencing power outages for several days. The community was particularly hit hard, as docks and boats were damaged or destroyed. Hurricane Helene swept up the coastline, just 90 miles offshore, with winds over 120 mph near its core. It kept gaining strength as it moved northeast, hitting the county’s coastal areas with hurricane-force winds and pushing tropical-storm-force winds far inland. Forecasters at the National Hurricane Center predicted storm surges of 8–12 feet for the area, prompting Hernando County officials to order a mandatory evacuation for areas west of US 19. It’s estimated that Helene’s storm surge did reach 8-feet in the coastal community of Hernando Beach. Many single story homes lost everything in the storm surge.

== See also ==
- Jenkins Creek Park
