= Jenkins Creek Park =

County park in Hernando Beach, Florida

Coordinates: 28.5227°N 82.6377°W

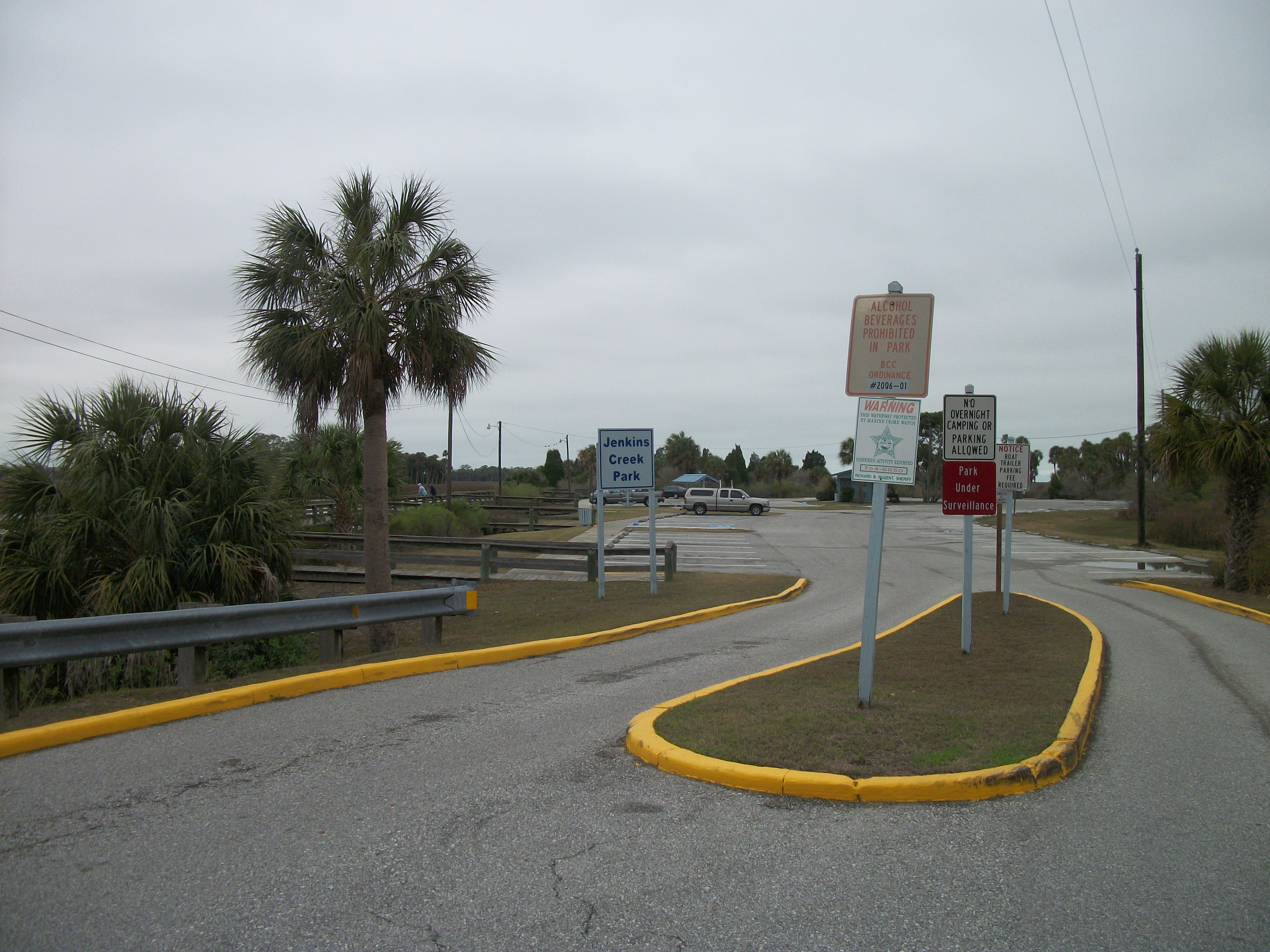
The boat launching entrance to Jenkins Creek Park

Jenkins Creek Park is a 3-acre (12,000 m^{2}) park that includes "natural freshwater springs, man-made canals, coastal marshes, uplands, and waterways leading to the Gulf of Mexico" as well as a boat launch for small boats or canoes, a fishing pier, grill, picnic tables, and restrooms. It is located in Hernando Beach in Hernando County, Florida, although Hernando County Parks Department gives the address as being in Spring Hill. Across the street is Linda Pedersen Park, a 135-acre (0.55 km^{2}) park connected by an aluminum boardwalk to Jenkins Creek Park. It is used for fishing and has a forty-foot-high observation tower offering "a panoramic view of the marsh and look out over the Gulf of Mexico." It also includes a playground and is in an area frequented by manatees. The park has grills, picnic tables, a pavilion, swimming area, playground, community building, showers, and restrooms.
