= Richard Mitchell (Florida politician) =

American politician (born 1956)

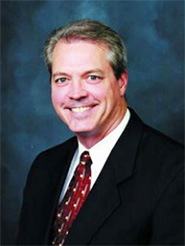

Member of the Florida Senate from the 4th district
- In office November 3, 1998 – November 5, 2002
- Preceded by: Charles Williams
- Succeeded by: Nancy Argenziano (redistricting)

Personal details
- Born: May 23, 1956 (age 70) Jasper, Florida
- Party: Democratic
- Spouse: Debra Rogers
- Children: 3
- Education: Florida State University (B.S.)
- Occupation: Businessman

Military service
- Allegiance: United States
- Branch/service: United States Navy

Richard Mitchell (born May 23, 1956) is a Democratic politician from Florida who served as a member of the Florida Senate from the 4th district from 1998 to 2002.

== Early life ==
Mitchell was born in Jasper, Florida, in 1956. He graduated from Florida State University with his bachelor's degree in English and speech communications in 1979, and served in the U.S. Navy.

== Florida Senate ==
In 1998, Mitchell considered running for the Florida House of Representatives, but instead challenged incumbent State Senator Charles Williams in the Democratic primary. Williams, a conservative Democrat, had attracted controversy during his time in the legislature, and Mitchell was supported by unions and trial lawyers' associations in the primary. Following an expensive campaign, Mitchell narrowly defeated Williams, winning 53 percent of the vote to his 47 percent. He was unopposed in the general election.

Mitchell ran for re-election in the 3rd district in 2002, and was challenged by Republican State Representative Nancy Argenziano. Following redistricting, the map was drawn to favor Argenziano, with most of the voters in the district residing in Citrus and Marion counties. Argenziano ultimately defeated Mitchell, winning 54 percent of the vote to his 46 percent.
