= Ginny Brown-Waite =

American politician (born 1943)

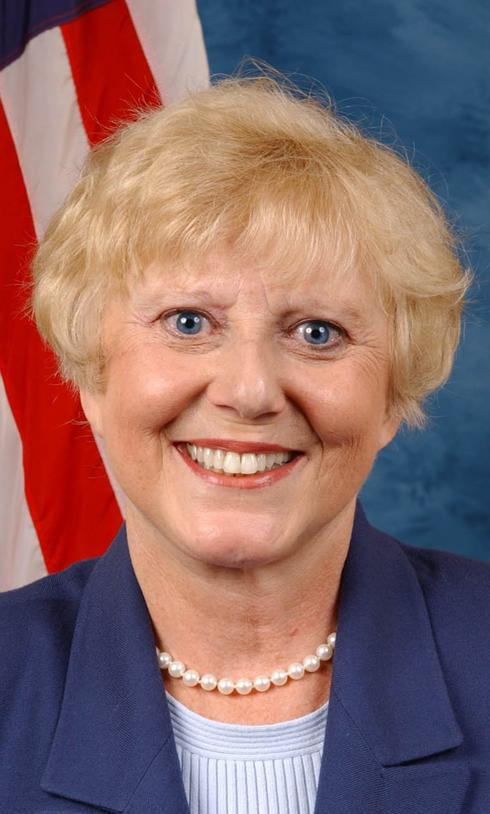

Member of the U.S. House of Representatives from Florida's 5th district
- In office January 3, 2003 – January 3, 2011
- Preceded by: Karen Thurman
- Succeeded by: Rich Nugent

Member of the Florida Senate from the 10th district
- In office 1993–2003
- Preceded by: Locke Burt
- Succeeded by: Tom Lee

Personal details
- Born: Virginia Frances Kniffen; October 5, 1943 (age 82) Albany, New York, U.S.
- Party: Republican
- Spouse(s): Daniel Brown (divorced) Harvey Waite (died) Anthony Selvaggio (died)
- Education: Empire State College (BS); Russell Sage College (MPA)

Virginia Brown-Waite (née Virginia Frances Kniffen; October 5, 1943) is an American politician who served as U.S. Representative for Florida's 5th congressional district from 2003 until 2011. She is a member of the Republican Party and a founder of Maggie's List.

The district stretched along several counties in western and central Florida, including territory in the metropolitan area of Tampa Bay.

== Early life, education, and career ==
Virginia Frances Kniffen was born in Albany, New York, on October 5, 1943. She attended Albany’s Vincentian High School. In 1976, she graduated from Empire State College, State University of New York (Northeast Center) with a BS in Interdisciplinary Studies. She was the first member of her family to earn a college degree. She later earned a master's degree in public administration from Russell Sage College.

She served as a staffer in the New York State Senate, working there for 17 years and eventually rising to the role of legislative director. During this time, she divorced her first husband and married Harvey Waite, a New York state trooper. After Harvey Waite’s retirement in the mid-1980s, they moved to Brooksville, Florida.

== Florida Legislature ==
She first became involved in local politics in 1990, winning election as a county commissioner in Hernando County, Florida, serving one term from 1991 to 1993. In November 1992, Brown-Waite defeated a 24-year incumbent and was elected to the Florida State Senate as a Republican. She served three terms, moving up the ranks to serve as Senate Majority Whip from 1999 to 2000, and as president pro tempore of the state senate from 2001 to 2002.

Brown-Waite expressed support for the death penalty. She says she believed she saw "a message" in a nosebleed suffered by death row inmate Allen Lee Davis during his execution on July 8, 1999. Brown-Waite, who saw in the blood the shape of a cross, believes that it either indicated Davis had made peace with God, or it was a message from God giving his blessing to the execution.

== U.S. House of Representatives ==
=== Committee assignments ===
- Committee on Ways and Means
  - Subcommittee on Health
  - Subcommittee on Social Security

=== Caucus memberships ===
- Co-Chair of the Unexploded Ordnance Caucus

=== Tenure ===
Since entering Congress, Brown-Waite has garnered a lifetime rating of 90 from the American Conservative Union. However, she broke with her party on a few occasions. She criticized George W. Bush for fielding questions from hand-picked crowds. "Let me tell you the difference between a GWB town-hall meeting – George W. Bush – and a GBW – Ginny Brown-Waite – town-hall meeting: I don't load the audience with just the choir," she once said. She was one of five Republicans who voted against a bill to give Terri Schiavo's parents the right to sue in federal court to keep her alive (Schiavo's home was located in the 5th). She is a member of Republican groups such as Christine Todd Whitman's It's My Party Too, Mike Castle's Republican Main Street Partnership, and The Wish List.

Brown-Waite's district has one of the highest concentrations of retirees in the country. In early 2005, she referred to the current Social Security system as a "Ponzi scheme". However, she was skeptical of the president's proposal for personal accounts, saying that he hadn't done a good job of selling it to seniors.

On April 6, 2005, Brown-Waite introduced the Jessica Lunsford Act, named for Jessica Lunsford, a nine-year-old from her district who was kidnapped, raped, and murdered in Homosassa, Florida, by John Couey. The bill, modeled after the Florida law of the same name, had the objectives to punish sex offenders and reduce their ability to re-offend. It had 107 cosponsors and was referred to a subcommittee of the House Judiciary Committee, but it was never voted upon (either by any committee or the full Congress), and it died when the 109th Congress finally adjourned.

On Iraq, after reports that Brown-Waite supports the withdrawal of U.S. troops within a year, her spokesman said in an e-mail that "it was taken out of context" and that "she said that if the Iraqis did not work toward troop and police deadlines, then Congress would put pressure on them to do so with the threat of denying funds for reconstruction and possibly withdrawing some troops." He also said that Brown-Waite would support "a properly-worded resolution" that would put forth a no-confidence vote in Congress for Secretary of Defense Donald Rumsfeld (who resigned in 2007).

Brown-Waite voted against an amendment that would have cut off funding for Planned Parenthood and other family planning organizations.

Brown-Waite is a staunch advocate of a federal prohibition of online poker. In 2006, she supported H.R. 4411, the Goodlatte-Leach Internet Gambling Prohibition Act In 2008, she opposed H.R. 5767, the Payment Systems Protection Act (a bill that sought to place a moratorium on enforcement of the Unlawful Internet Gambling Enforcement Act while the U.S. Treasury Department and the Federal Reserve defined "unlawful Internet gambling").

An ardent opponent of gun control, Brown-Waite was known for proudly carrying a gun on trips to her district. She proposed the American Heroes Repatriation Act, to move American soldiers buried in France and Belgium back to the United States., in the process angering French officials and constituents.

She also caused a minor controversy when, commenting on the economic-stimulus package proposed by President Bush in early 2008, she referred to the peoples of Puerto Rico and Guam as "foreign citizens" (when they are, in fact, American citizens and nationals, respectively). She has since clarified those comments with an article on the Orlando Sentinel.

On September 29, 2008, Brown-Waite voted against the Emergency Economic Stabilization Act of 2008, and also voted against the amended version which was enacted.

The House version of the American Recovery and Investment Act was passed on January 28, 2009. Brown-Waite was the only Republican to abstain from voting. All other 177 House Republicans voted against the Act.

=== Mark Foley scandal ===
In September 2006, Brown-Waite was told about an incident from 2003 or 2004 when an apparently inebriated Mark Foley had tried to gain access to the pages' dormitory. On September 28, 2006, an inappropriate e-mail that Foley sent was posted on ABCNEWS.com's "The Blotter". Brown-Waite launched her own investigation and alerted Republican leadership on September 29 both about the dorm incident and about pages who had been made to feel uncomfortable by Foley. Foley resigned that day and the scandal erupted that evening with news of the lurid instant messages he had sent former pages.

== Political campaigns ==
=== 2002 ===
The 5th District had been represented by Democrat Karen Thurman since its formation in 1993. After the 2000 Census, the Republican-controlled Florida legislature redrew the 5th to be more friendly to Republicans. For the most part, the new 5th overlapped Brown-Waite's state senate district. Brown-Waite won the Republican primary, then won a narrow victory in November 2002 over Thurman despite the unfavorable publicity that came in October when police caught her husband, former New York state trooper Harvey Waite, stealing pro-Thurman lawn signs.

=== 2004 ===
Brown-Waite was re-elected in 2004 with 66% of the vote against attorney Robert Whittell.

=== 2006 ===
Brown-Waite was re-elected to a third term in 2006, receiving 59% of the vote against Democrat John Russell.

=== 2008 ===
Brown-Waite was re-elected to a fourth term in 2008, receiving 61% of the vote against Democrat John Russell.

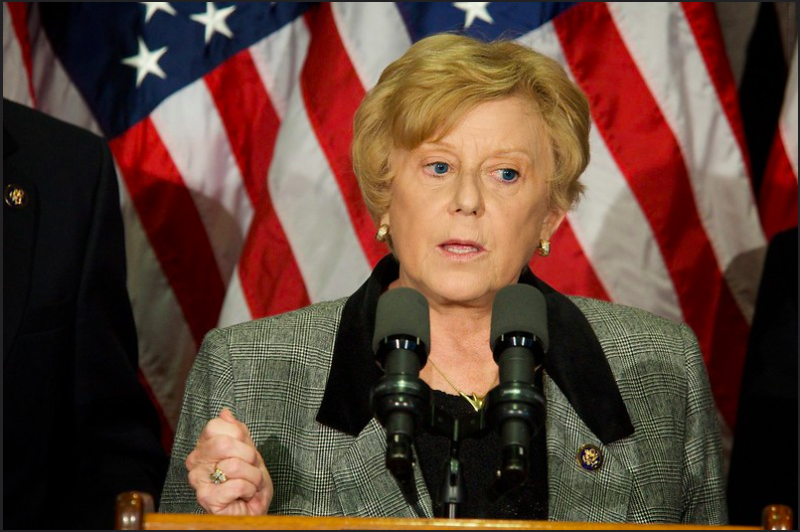
Ginny Brown-Waite speaking during a press conference at the Capitol in 2009.

Land o' Lakes Republican Jim King joined the race as a conservative candidate, attacking the moderate Congresswoman from the right on matters of national security, immigration, taxation, and supporting the troops, which is one of Brown-Waite's signature issues. He also made an appeal to conservative Christian primary voters. In the first three fundraising quarters, King raised $40,000, an amount dwarfed by the $176,000 Brown-Waite raised during that period, yet still large enough for King's campaign to have begun running local radio ads nine month in advance of primary day. Three Democrats declared their candidacies: 2006 nominee John Russell, H. David Werder and Carol Castagnero. Castagnero placed third in the Democratic primary for governor in 2006 and took 40% of the vote against State Senator Paula Dockery in 2004. John Russell was the Democratic nominee in the general election against Ginny Brown-Waite in 2006.

On November 26, 2007, it was reported that after years of hosting town hall meetings on the issue and calling for full hearing on the implications of the FAIR Tax, Brown-Waite had endorsed the FairTax proposal on September 24. King accused her of only changing her stance because of his support for it.

=== 2010 ===
On April 30, Brown-Waite announced she would be retiring at the end of her current term. In a statement, she cited long-running health problems, particularly with her pancreas. Brown-Waite endorsed Hernando County sheriff Richard B. Nugent as her successor.

=== 2012 ===
Brown-Waite considered running for local office in 2012.

== Notable statements ==
February 15, 2007: "Git-R-Done" During a February 15 floor debate on US participation in Iraq, Brown-Waite invoked Larry the Cable Guy and professed the following: "In the South, we have a wonderful saying and it goes like this: Get ‘er done. Our soldiers want to get it done and come home, and our President wants the same thing, and this Congress should demand the exact same thing. Let’s get out there and get ‘er done."

== See also ==
- Women in the United States House of Representatives

U.S. House of Representatives
Preceded by Karen Thurman	Member of the U.S. House of Representatives from Florida's 5th congressional district 2003–2011	Succeeded by Rich Nugent
Preceded by Shelley Moore Capito	Chair of the Congressional Women's Caucus; 2005–2007	Succeeded by Lois Capps
U.S. order of precedence (ceremonial)
Preceded by Ric Keller as Former U.S. Representative	Order of precedence of the United States as Former U.S. Representative	Succeeded by Kendrick Meek as Former U.S. Representative
