= List of United States senators in the 103rd Congress =

This is a complete list of United States senators during the 103rd United States Congress listed by seniority from January 3, 1993, to January 3, 1995.

Order of service is based on the commencement of the senator's first term. Behind this is former service as a senator (only giving the senator seniority within their new incoming class), service as vice president, a House member, a cabinet secretary, or a state governor. The final factor is the population of the senator's state.

In this congress, Ernest Hollings (D-South Carolina) was the most senior junior senator and Dianne Feinstein (D-California) was the most junior senior senator.

Senators who were sworn in during the middle of the two-year congressional term (up until the last senator who was not sworn in early after winning the November 1994 election) are listed at the end of the list with no number.

== Terms of service ==
Class	Terms of service of senators that expired in years
Class 1	Terms of service of senators that expired in 1995 (AZ, CA, CT, DE, FL, HI, IN, MA, MD, ME, MI, MN, MO, MS, MT, ND, NE, NJ, NM, NV, NY, OH, PA, RI, TN, TX, UT, VA, VT, WA, WI, WV, and WY.)
Class 2	Terms of service of senators that expired in 1997 (AK, AL, AR, CO, DE, GA, ID, IL, IA, KS, KY, LA, MA, ME, MI, MN, MS, MT, NC, NE, NH, NJ, NM, OK, OR, RI, SC, SD, TN, TX, VA, WV, and WY.)
Class 3	Terms of service of senators that expired in 1999 (AK, AL, AR, AZ, CA, CO, CT, FL, GA, HI, ID, IL, IN, IA, KS, KY, LA, MD, MO, NC, ND, New Hampshire, NV, New York, OH, OK, OR, PA, SC, SD, UT, VT, WA, and WI.)

== U.S. Senate seniority list ==
U.S. Senate seniority
Rank	Senator (party-state)	Seniority date	Other factors
1	Strom Thurmond (R-SC)	November 7, 1956	
2	Robert Byrd (D-WV)	January 3, 1959	
3	Claiborne Pell (D-RI)	January 3, 1961	
4	Ted Kennedy (D-MA)	November 7, 1962	
5	Daniel Inouye (D-HI)	January 3, 1963	
6	Ernest Hollings (D-SC)	November 9, 1966	
7	Mark Hatfield (R-OR)	January 10, 1967	
8	Ted Stevens (R-AK)	December 24, 1968	
9	Bob Dole (R-KS)	January 3, 1969	Former representative
10	Bob Packwood (R-OR)	January 3, 1969	
11	Bill Roth (R-DE)	January 1, 1971	
12	Sam Nunn (D-GA)	November 8, 1972	
13	Bennett Johnston Jr. (D-LA)	November 14, 1972	
14	Jesse Helms (R-NC)	January 3, 1973	North Carolina 12th in population (1970)
15	Pete Domenici (R-NM)	January 3, 1973	New Mexico 37th in population (1970)
16	Joe Biden (D-DE)	January 3, 1973	Delaware 46th in population (1970)
17	John Glenn (D-OH)	December 24, 1974	
18	Wendell H. Ford (D-KY)	December 28, 1974	
19	Dale Bumpers (D-AR)	January 3, 1975	Former governor
20	Patrick Leahy (D-VT)	January 3, 1975	
21	John Danforth (R-MO)	December 27, 1976	
22	Howard Metzenbaum (D-OH)	December 29, 1976	Previously a senator
23	John Chafee (R-RI)	December 29, 1976	
24	Donald W. Riegle, Jr. (D-MI)	December 30, 1976	
25	Paul Sarbanes (D-MD)	January 3, 1977	Former representative
26	Pat Moynihan (D-NY)	January 3, 1977	New York 2nd in population (1970)
27	Richard Lugar (R-IN)	January 3, 1977	Indiana 11th in population (1970)
28	Jim Sasser (D-TN)	January 3, 1977	Tennessee 17th in population (1970)
29	Dennis DeConcini (D-AZ)	January 3, 1977	Arizona 22nd in population (1970)
30	Orrin Hatch (R-UT)	January 3, 1977	Utah 36th in population (1970)
31	Malcolm Wallop (R-WY)	January 3, 1977	Wyoming 49th in population (1970)
32	David Durenberger (R-MN)	November 8, 1978	
33	Max Baucus (D-MT)	December 15, 1978	
34	Nancy Kassebaum (R-KS)	December 23, 1978	
35	Thad Cochran (R-MS)	December 27, 1978	
36	Alan K. Simpson (R-WY)	January 1, 1979	
37	John Warner (R-VA)	January 2, 1979	
38	David Pryor (D-AR)	January 3, 1979	Former representative (6 years, 2 months)
39	William Cohen (R-ME)	January 3, 1979	Former representative (6 years)
40	Larry Pressler (R-SD)	January 3, 1979	Former representative (4 years)
41	David L. Boren (D-OK)	January 3, 1979	Former governor - Oklahoma 27th in population (1970)
42	J. James Exon (D-NE)	January 3, 1979	Former governor - Nebraska 35th in population (1970)
43	Carl Levin (D-MI)	January 3, 1979	Michigan 7th in population (1970)
44	Bill Bradley (D-NJ)	January 3, 1979	New Jersey 8th in population (1970)
45	Howell Heflin (D-AL)	January 3, 1979	Alabama 21st in population (1970)
46	George J. Mitchell (D-ME)	May 17, 1980	
47	Chris Dodd (D-CT)	January 3, 1981	Former representative (6 years) - Connecticut 24th in population
48	Chuck Grassley (R-IA)	January 3, 1981	Former representative (6 years) - Iowa 25th in population (1970)
49	Al D'Amato (R-NY)	January 3, 1981	New York 2nd in population (1970)
50	Arlen Specter (R-PA)	January 3, 1981	Pennsylvania 3rd in population (1970)
51	Don Nickles (R-OK)	January 3, 1981	Oklahoma 27th in population (1970)
52	Frank Murkowski (R-AK)	January 3, 1981	Alaska 50th in population (1970)
53	Frank Lautenberg (D-NJ)	December 27, 1982	
54	Jeff Bingaman (D-NM)	January 3, 1983	
55	John Kerry (D-MA)	January 2, 1985	
56	Paul Simon (D-IL)	January 3, 1985	Former representative (10 years) - Illinois 5th in population (1980)
57	Tom Harkin (D-IA)	January 3, 1985	Former representative (10 years) - Iowa 27th in population (1980)
58	Phil Gramm (R-TX)	January 3, 1985	Former representative (6 years)
59	Mitch McConnell (R-KY)	January 3, 1985	
60	Jay Rockefeller (D-WV)	January 15, 1985	
61	John Breaux (D-LA)	January 3, 1987	Former representative (14 years)
62	Barbara Mikulski (D-MD)	January 3, 1987	Former representative (10 years)
63	Richard Shelby (D, R-AL)	January 3, 1987	Former representative (8 years) - Alabama 22nd in population (1980)
64	Tom Daschle (D-SD)	January 3, 1987	Former representative (8 years) - South Dakota 45th in population (1980)
65	John McCain (R-AZ)	January 3, 1987	Former representative (4 years) - Arizona 29th in population (1980)
66	Harry Reid (D-NV)	January 3, 1987	Former representative (4 years) - Nevada 43rd in population (1980)
67	Bob Graham (D-FL)	January 3, 1987	Former governor - Florida 7th in population (1980)
68	Kit Bond (R-MO)	January 3, 1987	Former governor - Missouri 15th in population (1980)
69	Kent Conrad (D-ND)	January 3, 1987	
70	Slade Gorton (R-WA)	January 3, 1989	Previously a senator
71	Trent Lott (R-MS)	January 3, 1989	Former representative (16 years)
72	Jim Jeffords (R-VT)	January 3, 1989	Former representative (14 years)
73	Dan Coats (R-IN)	January 3, 1989	Former representative (8 years)
74	Connie Mack (R-FL)	January 3, 1989	Former representative (6 years)
75	Richard Bryan (D-NV)	January 3, 1989	Former governor (6 years)
76	Chuck Robb (D-VA)	January 3, 1989	Former governor (4 years) - Virginia 14th in population (1980)
77	Bob Kerrey (D-NE)	January 3, 1989	Former governor (4 years) - Nebraska 35th in population (1980)
78	Herb Kohl (D-WI)	January 3, 1989	Wisconsin 16th in population (1980)
79	Joe Lieberman (D-CT)	January 3, 1989	Connecticut 25th in population (1980)
80	Conrad Burns (R-MT)	January 3, 1989	Montana 44th in population (1980)
81	Daniel Akaka (D-HI)	May 16, 1990	
82	Bob Smith (R-NH)	December 7, 1990	
83	Hank Brown (R-CO)	January 3, 1991	Former representative (10 years)
84	Larry Craig (R-ID)	January 3, 1991	Former representative (6 years)
85	Paul Wellstone (D-MN)	January 3, 1991	
86	Harris Wofford (D-PA)	May 9, 1991	
87	Dianne Feinstein (D-CA)	November 10, 1992	
88	Byron Dorgan (D-ND)	December 15, 1992	
89	Harlan Mathews (D-TN)	January 2, 1993	
90	Barbara Boxer (D-CA)	January 3, 1993	Former representative (10 years)
91	Judd Gregg (R-NH)	January 3, 1993	Former representative (8 years)
92	Ben Nighthorse Campbell (D-CO)	January 3, 1993	Former representative (6 years)
93	Bob Krueger (D-TX)	January 3, 1993	Former representative (4 years)
94	Carol Moseley Braun (D-IL)	January 3, 1993	Illinois 6th in population (1990)
95	Lauch Faircloth (R-NC)	January 3, 1993	North Carolina 10th in population (1990)
96	Paul Coverdell (R-GA)	January 3, 1993	Georgia 11th in population (1990)
97	Russ Feingold (D-WI)	January 3, 1993	Wisconsin 16th in population (1990)
98	Patty Murray (D-WA)	January 3, 1993	Washington 18th in population (1990)
99	Bob Bennett (R-UT)	January 3, 1993	Utah 35th in population (1990)
100	Dirk Kempthorne (R-ID)	January 3, 1993	Idaho 42nd in population (1990)
	Kay Bailey Hutchison (R-TX)	June 14, 1993	
	Jim Inhofe (R-OK)	November 17, 1994	
	Fred Thompson (R-TN)	December 2, 1994	

The most senior senators by class were Robert Byrd (D-West Virginia) from Class 1, Strom Thurmond (R-South Carolina) from Class 2, and Daniel Inouye (D-Hawaii) from Class 3.

== See also ==
- 103rd United States Congress
- List of United States representatives in the 103rd Congress
