= Karen Thurman =

American politician (born 1951)

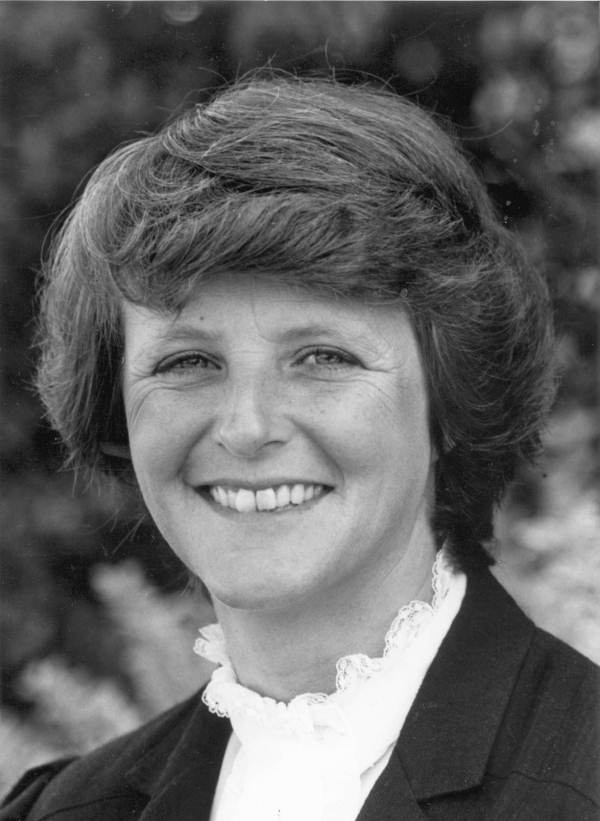

Chair of the Florida Democratic Party
- In office September 13, 2005 – January 8, 2011
- Preceded by: Scott Maddox
- Succeeded by: Rod Smith

Member of the U.S. House of Representatives from Florida's 5th district
- In office January 3, 1993 – January 3, 2003
- Preceded by: Bill McCollum (redistricted)
- Succeeded by: Ginny Brown-Waite

Member of the Florida Senate from the 4th district
- In office November 2, 1982 – November 3, 1992
- Preceded by: Pat Thomas
- Succeeded by: Charles Williams

Personal details
- Born: Karen Lee Loveland; January 12, 1951 (age 75) Rapid City, South Dakota, U.S.
- Party: Democratic
- Spouse: John Thurman (m. 1973)
- Children: 2
- Education: Santa Fe Community College; University of Florida (BA)

Karen Lee Loveland Thurman (born January 12, 1951) is a former U.S. representative from Florida, serving five consecutive terms from 1993 to 2003. She is a Democrat and served as chair of the Florida Democratic Party from 2005 to 2010.

== Early life and education ==
She was born on January 12, 1951, in Rapid City, South Dakota, but has spent most of her life in Florida. She received her associate degree from Santa Fe College in Gainesville in 1970 and later her bachelor's degree in education from the University of Florida in Gainesville, Florida in 1973. She married John Patrick Thurman in Gainesville on June 9, 1973. They have two children, McLin (Macky) and Liberty Lee, and make their home in Dunnellon, Florida.

== Early political career ==
Thurman was first elected to public office in 1974, when she won a seat on the city council of Dunnellon, Florida, on which she served until 1983. She served as Mayor of Dunnellon from 1979 to 1981. She served in the Florida State Senate from 1983 to 1993.

== Tenure in Congress ==
Florida gained three congressional districts after the 1990 census. One of them was the 5th District, which stretched from Gainesville to the far northern portion of the Tampa Bay Area. It was an open secret that this district was drawn for Thurman. She was elected to the House from that district in 1992 and was reelected four more times with no serious opposition.

Thurman was recognized as an expert on health, veterans, and tax issues. She was only the sixth woman to serve on the House Ways and Means Committee. On Ways and Means she fought for lower prescription drugs, increased access to health insurance, and tax relief. Prior to her appointment to Ways and Means in 1996, Congresswoman Thurman served on both the House Agriculture Committee and the Committee on Government Reform and Oversight.

After the 2000 census, the Republican-controlled Florida legislature reconfigured the 5th to make it friendlier to Republicans. She lost heavily Democratic Gainesville and surrounding Alachua County while picking up some heavily Republican territory between Tampa and Orlando. The new 5th contained much of the territory located in the State Senate district of that body's President Pro Tem, Ginny Brown-Waite. Nonetheless, Thurman ran for reelection. Even though the redrawn district had gone narrowly for George W. Bush in 2000 (Al Gore had won her old district handily), Thurman just barely lost to Brown-Waite. Since Thurman left office, the Democrats have cleared the 40 percent barrier in the district, now numbered as the 11th, only once.

== Post-congressional career ==
In 2005 Thurman was elected Chairman of the Florida Democratic Party (FDP), succeeding Chairman Scott Maddox, who resigned in order to seek the Democratic nomination for governor. Thurman resigned on November 12, 2010, following the midterm elections.

Thurman is a member of the ReFormers Caucus of Issue One.

== Personal ==
Her husband John Thurman was a Judge. She has two children; Macky and Liberty Thurman. She also has three grandchildren; Karlee, Madison and Lawson. {Liberty Thurman June 2023}

== See also ==
- Women in the United States House of Representatives

U.S. House of Representatives
Preceded by Bill McCollum	Member of the U.S. House of Representatives from Florida's 5th congressional district 1993–2003	Succeeded by Ginny Brown-Waite
Party political offices
Preceded by Scott Maddox	Chair of the Florida Democratic Party; 2005–2011	Succeeded by Rod Smith
U.S. order of precedence (ceremonial)
Preceded by Dan Miller as Former U.S. Representative	Order of precedence of the United States as Former U.S. Representative	Succeeded by Mark Foley as Former U.S. Representative
