= Florida's 4th Senate district =

Florida electoral ward

Florida's 4th State Senate district
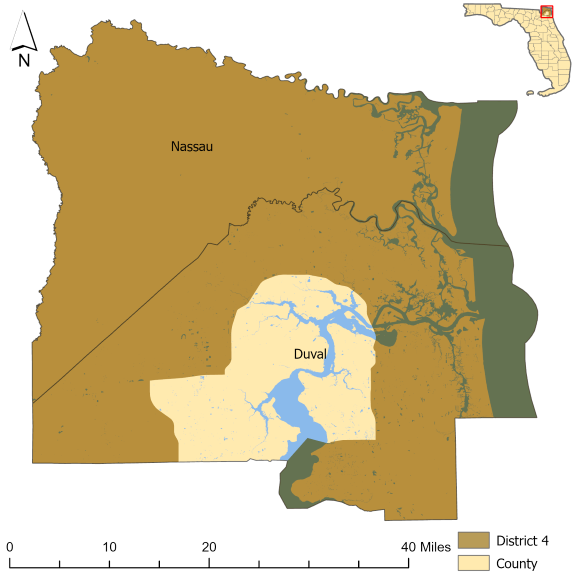
- Interactive map of district boundary since January 3, 2023
Senator
Clay Yarborough; R
- Demographics: 68.9% White; 12.3% Black; 10.3% Hispanic; 5.4% Asian; 0.3% Native American; 0.1% Hawaiian/Pacific Islander
- Population (2020): 559,117

Florida's 4th Senate district elects one member of the Florida Senate. The district consists of Nassau county and part of Duval county, in the U.S. state of Florida. The current senator is Republican Clay Yarborough.

== List of senators ==
NOTE: The following information was gathered from the Florida Senate website. Only records of senators from 1998–present are kept.

Portrait	Name	Party	Years of service	Home city/state	Notes
	Richard Mitchell	Democratic	1998–2002		Consisted of Baker, Dixie, Gilchrist, Hamilton, Lafayette, Nassau, Taylor and parts of Alachua, Bradford, Citrus, Columbia, Jefferson, Leon, Levy, Madison, Marion, Suwannee and Union county
	Charlie Clary	Republican	1998–2006		Consisted of parts of Bay, Escambia, Okaloosa, Santa Rosa, Walton counties; President Pro Tempore (2004–2006)
	Don Gaetz	Republican	2006–2012	Rugby, North Dakota	Consisted of parts of Bay, Escambia, Okaloosa, Santa Rosa, Walton counties
	Aaron Bean	Republican	2012–2022	Fernandina Beach, Florida	Consisted of Nassau county and part of Duval county; President Pro Tempore (2020–2022)
	Clay Yarborough	Republican	2022–Present	Mobile, Alabama	Consists of Nassau county and part of Duval county

== Elections ==
NOTE: The following results were gathered from the Florida Department of State. Uncontested election results are not provided.

=== 1978 ===
Democratic Primary (1978)
Party	Candidate	Votes	%
Democratic	Pat Thomas	68,599	85.7%
Democratic	Lenora Walsh	11,417	14.3%
Total votes		80,016	100%

=== 1982 ===
Democratic Primary (1982)
Party	Candidate	Votes	%
Democratic	C. P. "Pat" Brewer	15,158	43.2%
Democratic	Karen Thurman	19,935	56.8%
Total votes		35,093	100%

General Election (1982)
Party	Candidate	Votes	%
Democratic	Karen L. Thurman	51,983	54.4%
Republican	Thad Lowerey	43,590	45.6%
Total votes		95,573	100%

=== 1986 ===
General Election (1986)
Party	Candidate	Votes	%
Democratic	Karen L. Thurman	77,029	61.2%
Republican	Lewis Dinkins	48,820	38.8%
Total votes		125,849	100%

=== 1990 ===
Republican Primary (1990)
Party	Candidate	Votes	%
Republican	Merl Conine	7,094	25.7%
Republican	Tom Hogan	20,530	74.3%
Total votes		27,624	100%

General Election (1990)
Party	Candidate	Votes	%
Republican	Tom Hogan	59,695	41.4%
Democratic	Karen L. Thurman	84,661	58.6%
Total votes		114,356	100%

=== 1992 ===
Democratic Primary (1992)
Party	Candidate	Votes	%
Democratic	Bob Boyd	14,007	19.1%
Democratic	Will Irby	13,676	18.6%
Democratic	Lamar "Poss" Lee	12,569	17.1%
Democratic	Don Tucker	15,441	21.1%
Democratic	Charles Williams	17,639	24.1%
Total votes		73,332	100%

Democratic Primary Runoff (1992)
Party	Candidate	Votes	%
Democratic	Don Tucker	26,353	45.7%
Democratic	Charles Williams	31,340	54.3%
Total votes		57,693	100%

=== 1994 ===
Democratic Primary (1994)
Party	Candidate	Votes	%
Democratic	Bob Glover	11,131	22.2%
Democratic	Glenn Jones	8,160	16.2%
Democratic	Lamar "Poss" Lee	5,291	10.5%
Democratic	Charles Williams	25,670	51.1%
Total votes		50,252	100%

General Election (1994)
Party	Candidate	Votes	%
Democratic	Charles Williams	67,800	60.7%
Republican	George Onett	43,988	39.3%
Total votes		111,788	100%

=== 1998 ===
Democratic Primary (1998)
Party	Candidate	Votes	%
Democratic	Richard Mitchell	23,146	52.7%
Democratic	Charles D. Williams	20,733	47.3%
Total votes		43,879	100%

=== 2002 ===
Republican Primary (2002)
Party	Candidate	Votes	%
Republican	Charlie Clary	25,135	54.5%
Republican	Jerry Melvin	20,946	45.5%
Total votes		46,081	100%

=== 2012 ===
Republican Primary (2012)
Party	Candidate	Votes	%
Republican	Aaron Bean	31,269	64.2%
Republican	Mike Weinstein	17,451	35.8%
Total votes		48,720	100%

General Election (2012)
Party	Candidate	Votes	%
Republican	Aaron Bean	144,352	62.2%
Democratic	Nancy Soderberg	87,766	37.8%
Write-In	Kyle Alexander Bedran	0	0.0%
Write-In	Patrick Dewayne Mency	0	0.0%
Total votes		232,118	100%

=== 2018 ===
Republican Primary (2018)
Party	Candidate	Votes	%
Republican	Aaron Bean	50,275	87.4%
Republican	Carlos E. Slay	7,274	12.6%
Total votes		57,549	100%

General Election (2018)
Party	Candidate	Votes	%
Republican	Aaron Bean	149,347	63.4%
Democratic	Billee Bussard	80,598	34.2%
Libertarian	Joanna Liberty Tavares	5,514	2.3%
Total votes		235,459	100%

=== 2022 ===
General Election (2022)
Party	Candidate	Votes	%
Republican	Clay Yarborough	149,177	67.6%
Democratic	Sharmin Smith	71,472	32.4%
Total votes		220,649	100%
