= Hernando County Sheriff's Office =

Law enforcement agency in Florida, United States

- Abbreviation: HCSO

Agency overview
- Formed: 1845

Jurisdictional structure
- Operations jurisdiction: USA
- Area: 589 sq mi
- Population: 194,515
- Legal jurisdiction: Hernando County
- Governing body: Hernando County Board of Commissioners
- General nature: Civilian police

Operational structure
- Agency executives: Al Nienhuis, Sheriff; Kenneth Hayden, Chief Deputy; Shaun Klucznik, Major; Philip Lakin, Major

The Hernando County Sheriff's Office (HCSO) serves as the primary law enforcement agency for a population of 194,515 residents across 589 square miles (1,530 km2) in Hernando County, Florida, United States.

== History ==
The sheriff's office commenced operations on 1865.

== Organization ==
The current sheriff is Al Nienhuis.

The HCSO is divided into three bureaus:

- The Law Enforcement Operations Bureau oversees the patrol, and the criminal investigations division.
- The Judicial Bureau which oversees the Detention Division.
- Administrative Bureau which oversees Information Technology division and Communications division.
