= Florida's 5th congressional district =

U.S. House district for Florida

Coordinates: 29°23′07″N 81°45′04″W

- Map of district boundaries since January 3, 2023 (Note: The district includes the same census blocks as drawn for the 2020 redistricting cycle in 2022 and during mid-decade redistricting in 2026. As such, boundaries of the district will not change at the 2026 elections.) (Interactive map version)
- Representative: John Rutherford; R–Jacksonville
- Area: 3,911 mi^{2} (10,130 km^{2})
- Distribution: 83.37% urban; 16.63% rural
- Population (2025): 853,120
- Median household income: $91,429
- Ethnicity: 64.7% White; 12.1% Hispanic; 11.6% Black; 6.0% Asian; 4.8% Two or more races; 0.9% other
- Cook PVI: R+10

Florida's 5th congressional district is a congressional district in the U.S. state of Florida. It includes the southeastern area of Jacksonville which comprises areas such as Arlington, East Arlington, Southside, Mandarin, San Jose, and the Beaches. It stretches south to St. Augustine in St. Johns County.

From 2002 to 2013 the district comprised all of Citrus, Hernando, and Sumter counties and most of Lake, Levy, and Pasco counties and portions of Marion and Polk counties. The district included northern exurbs of Tampa and western exurbs of Orlando within the high-growth Interstate 4 Corridor. This iteration of the 5th district is now largely contained in the 11th district.

As defined by the state legislature in 2013 (which lasted until 2017), the 5th district ran from Jacksonville to Orlando; it was considered one of the most-gerrymandered congressional districts in the country. Before 2013, similar territory was included in the 3rd district.

After court-mandated redistricting, the district became a majority-minority district from 2017 to 2023. It extended along Florida's northern boundary from Jacksonville to Tallahassee and included all of Baker, Gadsden, Hamilton and Madison counties and portions of Columbia, Duval, Jefferson, and Leon counties.

The district is currently represented by Republican John Rutherford.

== Characteristics ==
Florida's 3rd congressional district was renumbered to 5th congressional district but was little changed in the redistricting process in 2012, still winding from Orlando in the south to central Jacksonville in the north.

From 1973 to 1993 the erstwhile 3rd district was based in Orange County, including Walt Disney World and most of Orlando. The peculiar shape of the 3rd (now 5th) congressional district dates from reapportionment done by the Florida Legislature after the 1990 U.S. census. The 1993–2012 3rd congressional district was geographically distinctive. Starting from the southern part of the district, it included the Pine Hills area of the Orlando-Kissimmee Metropolitan Area with small pockets of African-American neighborhoods in the cities of Sanford, Gainesville, Palatka, and finally the larger African American communities of Jacksonville. Connecting these areas were regions which are sparsely populated—either expansive rural areas or narrow strips which are only a few miles wide. Barack Obama received 73% of the vote in this district in the 2008 Presidential election.

=== Court-ordered changes ===
On July 11, 2014, Florida Circuit Court Judge Terry Lewis ruled that this district, along with the neighboring District 10, had been drawn to favor the Republican Party by packing black Democratic voters into District 5. On August 1, Judge Lewis gave Florida's state legislature an Aug. 15 deadline to submit new congressional maps for those two districts.

5th district Representative Corrine Brown issued a statement blasting Lewis's decision on the district map as "seriously flawed", and Congressional Black Caucus Chairwoman Marcia Fudge sent a sharply worded letter to Democratic Congressional Campaign Committee Chairman Steve Israel complaining about the party's support for the lawsuit challenging Florida's district maps.

Brown said that "we will go all the way to the United States Supreme Court, dealing with making sure that African Americans are not disenfranchised." Florida House Redistricting Chairman Richard Corcoran, a Republican, said that "consideration of political data is legally required" to ensure that district boundaries would not be so shifted as to not allow African-Americans a chance to elect representatives of their choice.

On appeal, the Florida Supreme Court approved a redrawn version of District 5 on December 2, 2015. That plan went into effect for the 2016 elections. The new district had a dramatically different shape than its predecessor. It now stretched in an east-west configuration along the Georgia border from downtown Jacksonville to Tallahassee. However, it was no less Democratic than its predecessor, as noted in the Florida Supreme Court's final opinion:

With a black share of registered Democrats of 66.1%, the black candidate of choice is likely to win a contested Democratic primary, and with a Democratic registration advantage of 61.1% to 23.0% over Republicans, the Democratic candidate is likely to win the general election.

== Recent election results from statewide races ==
Year	Office	Results
2008	President	McCain 61% - 38%
2010	Senate	Rubio 63% - 15%
2010	Governor	Scott 62% - 38%
2010	Attorney General	Bondi 65% - 28%
2010	Chief Financial Officer	Atwater 66% - 27%
2012	President	Romney 64% - 36%
2012	Senate	Mack IV 57% - 43%
2014	Governor	Scott 67% - 33%
2016	President	Trump 58% - 37%
2016	Senate	Rubio 66% - 30%
2018	Senate	Scott 60% - 40%
2018	Governor	DeSantis 58% - 41%
2018	Attorney General	Moody 62% - 37%
2018	Chief Financial Officer	Patronis 62% - 38%
2020	President	Trump 57% - 41%
2022	Senate	Rubio 64% - 35%
2022	Governor	DeSantis 65% - 34%
2022	Attorney General	Moody 67% - 33%
2022	Chief Financial Officer	Patronis 66% - 34%
2024	President	Trump 60% - 39%
2024	Senate	Scott 60% - 38%

== Composition ==
For the 118th and successive Congresses (based on redistricting following the 2020 census), the district contains all or portions of the following counties and communities:

Duval County (4)

Atlantic Beach, Jacksonville (part; also 4th), Jacksonville Beach, Neptune Beach

St. Johns County (9)

Fruit Cove, Nocatee, Palm Valley, Sawgrass, St. Augustine, St. Augustine Beach, St. Augustine South (part; also 6th), Vilano Beach, World Golf Village

== List of members representing the district ==
Member	Party	Years	Cong ress	Electoral history	District location
District created January 3, 1937
Joe Hendricks (DeLand)	Democratic	January 3, 1937 – January 3, 1949	75th 76th 77th 78th 79th 80th	Elected in 1936. Re-elected in 1938. Re-elected in 1940. Re-elected in 1942. Re-elected in 1944. Re-elected in 1946. Retired.	1937–1943 [data missing]
Joe Hendricks (DeLand)	Democratic	January 3, 1937 – January 3, 1949	75th 76th 77th 78th 79th 80th	Elected in 1936. Re-elected in 1938. Re-elected in 1940. Re-elected in 1942. Re-elected in 1944. Re-elected in 1946. Retired.	1943–1953 [data missing]
Syd Herlong (Leesburg)	Democratic	January 3, 1949 – January 3, 1967	81st 82nd 83rd 84th 85th 86th 87th 88th 89th	Elected in 1948. Re-elected in 1950. Re-elected in 1952. Re-elected in 1954. Re-elected in 1956. Re-elected in 1958. Re-elected in 1960. Re-elected in 1962. Re-elected in 1964. Re-elected in 1966. Redistricted to the 4th district.	1943–1953 [data missing]
Syd Herlong (Leesburg)	Democratic	January 3, 1949 – January 3, 1967	81st 82nd 83rd 84th 85th 86th 87th 88th 89th	Elected in 1948. Re-elected in 1950. Re-elected in 1952. Re-elected in 1954. Re-elected in 1956. Re-elected in 1958. Re-elected in 1960. Re-elected in 1962. Re-elected in 1964. Re-elected in 1966. Redistricted to the 4th district.	1953–1963 [data missing]
Syd Herlong (Leesburg)	Democratic	January 3, 1949 – January 3, 1967	81st 82nd 83rd 84th 85th 86th 87th 88th 89th	Elected in 1948. Re-elected in 1950. Re-elected in 1952. Re-elected in 1954. Re-elected in 1956. Re-elected in 1958. Re-elected in 1960. Re-elected in 1962. Re-elected in 1964. Re-elected in 1966. Redistricted to the 4th district.	1963–1973 [data missing]
Edward Gurney (Winter Park)	Republican	January 3, 1967 – January 3, 1969	90th	Redistricted from the 11th district and re-elected in 1966. Retired.	1963–1973 [data missing]
Lou Frey (Winter Park)	Republican	January 3, 1969 – January 3, 1973	91st 92nd	Elected in 1968. Re-elected in 1970. Redistricted to the 9th district.	1963–1973 [data missing]
Bill Gunter (Orlando)	Democratic	January 3, 1973 – January 3, 1975	93rd	Elected in 1972. Retired to run for U.S. senator.	1973–1983 [data missing]
Richard Kelly (Holiday)	Republican	January 3, 1975 – January 3, 1981	94th 95th 96th	Elected in 1974. Re-elected in 1976. Re-elected in 1978. Lost renomination after involvement in the Abscam scandal.	1973–1983 [data missing]
Bill McCollum (Longwood)	Republican	January 3, 1981 – January 3, 1993	97th 98th 99th 100th 101st 102nd	Elected in 1980. Re-elected in 1982. Re-elected in 1984. Re-elected in 1986. Re-elected in 1988. Re-elected in 1990. Redistricted to the 8th district.	1973–1983 [data missing]
Bill McCollum (Longwood)	Republican	January 3, 1981 – January 3, 1993	97th 98th 99th 100th 101st 102nd	Elected in 1980. Re-elected in 1982. Re-elected in 1984. Re-elected in 1986. Re-elected in 1988. Re-elected in 1990. Redistricted to the 8th district.	1983–1993 [data missing]
Karen Thurman (Dunnellon)	Democratic	January 3, 1993 – January 3, 2003	103rd 104th 105th 106th 107th	Elected in 1992. Re-elected in 1994. Re-elected in 1996. Re-elected in 1998. Re-elected in 2000. Lost re-election.	1993–2003 [data missing]
Ginny Brown-Waite (Brooksville)	Republican	January 3, 2003 – January 3, 2011	108th 109th 110th 111th	Elected in 2002. Re-elected in 2004. Re-elected in 2006. Re-elected in 2008. Retired due to health problems.	2003–2013
Rich Nugent (Spring Hill)	Republican	January 3, 2011 – January 3, 2013	112th	Elected in 2010. Redistricted to the 11th district.	2003–2013
Corrine Brown (Jacksonville)	Democratic	January 3, 2013 – January 3, 2017	113th 114th	Redistricted from the 3rd district and re-elected in 2012. Re-elected in 2014. Lost renomination after criminal indictment.	2013–2017
Al Lawson (Tallahassee)	Democratic	January 3, 2017 – January 3, 2023	115th 116th 117th	Elected in 2016. Re-elected in 2018. Re-elected in 2020. Redistricted to the 2nd district and lost re-election in 2022.	2017–2023
John Rutherford (Jacksonville)	Republican	January 3, 2023 – present	118th 119th	Redistricted from the 4th district and re-elected in 2022. Re-elected in 2024. Re-elected in 2026.	2023–present: Most of Jacksonville, along with parts of that city's southern and eastern suburbs and the city of St. Augustine

== Election results ==
=== 2002 ===
Florida's 5th Congressional District Election (2002)
Party	Candidate	Votes	%
Republican	Ginny Brown-Waite	121,998	47.90%
Democratic	Karen L. Thurman (Incumbent)	117,758	46.24%
Independent	Jack Gargan	8,639	3.39%
Independent	Brian P. Moore	6,223	2.44%
No party	Others	53	0.02%
Total votes		254,671	100.00%
Turnout			
Republican gain from Democratic			

=== 2004 ===
Florida's 5th Congressional District Election (2004)
Party	Candidate	Votes	%
Republican	Ginny Brown-Waite (Incumbent)	240,315	65.93%
Democratic	Robert G. Whittel	124,140	34.06%
No party	Others	33	0.01%
Total votes		364,488	100.00%
Turnout			
Republican hold			

=== 2006 ===
Florida's 5th Congressional District Election (2006)
Party	Candidate	Votes	%
Republican	Ginny Brown-Waite (Incumbent)	162,421	59.85%
Democratic	John T. Russell	108,959	40.15%
Total votes		271,380	100.00%
Turnout			
Republican hold			

=== 2008 ===
Florida's 5th Congressional District Election (2008)
Party	Candidate	Votes	%
Republican	Ginny Brown-Waite (Incumbent)	265,186	61.15%
Democratic	John T. Russell	168,446	38.85%
Total votes		433,632	100.00%
Turnout			
Republican hold			

=== 2010 ===
Florida's 5th Congressional District Election (2010)
Party	Candidate	Votes	%
Republican	Rich Nugent	208,815	67.43%
Democratic	Jim Piccillo	100,858	32.57%
Total votes		309,673	
Turnout			100.0%
Republican hold			

=== 2012 ===
Florida's 5th Congressional District Election (2012)
Party	Candidate	Votes	%
Democratic	Corrine Brown	190,472	70.80%
Republican	LeAnne Kolb	70,700	26.30%
No Party Affiliation	Eileen Fleming	7,978	3.00%
Total votes		269,153	
Turnout			100.0%
Democratic gain from Republican			

=== 2014 ===
Florida's 5th Congressional District Election (2014)
Party	Candidate	Votes	%
Democratic	Corrine Brown (Incumbent)	112,340	65.47%
Republican	Glo Smith	59,237	34.53%
Total votes		171,577	
Turnout			100.0%
Democratic hold			

=== 2016 ===
Florida's 5th Congressional District Election (2016)
Party	Candidate	Votes	%
Democratic	Al Lawson	194,549	64.2%
Republican	Glo Smith	108,325	35.8%
Total votes		302,874	
Turnout			100.0%
Democratic hold			

=== 2018 ===
Florida's 5th Congressional District Election (2018)
Party	Candidate	Votes	%
Democratic	Al Lawson (Incumbent)	180,527	66.78%
Republican	Virginia Fuller	89,799	33.22%
Total votes		270,326	100.0%
Democratic hold			

=== 2020 ===
Florida's 5th Congressional District Election (2020)
Party	Candidate	Votes	%
Democratic	Al Lawson (Incumbent)	219,463	65.13%
Republican	Gary Adler	117,510	34.87%
Total votes		336,973	100.0%
Democratic hold			

=== 2022 ===
Florida's 5th Congressional District Election (2022)
Party	Candidate	Votes	%
Republican	John Rutherford		
Total votes			100.0%
Republican hold			

=== 2024 ===
Florida's 5th Congressional District Election (2024)
Party	Candidate	Votes	%
Republican	John Rutherford (Incumbent)	267,471	63.07%
Democratic	Jay McGovern	156,570	36.92%
No party	Gary Koniz	23	0.01%
Total votes		424,064	100.0%
Republican hold			
