= Jacob Young (baseball) =

American baseball player (born 1999)

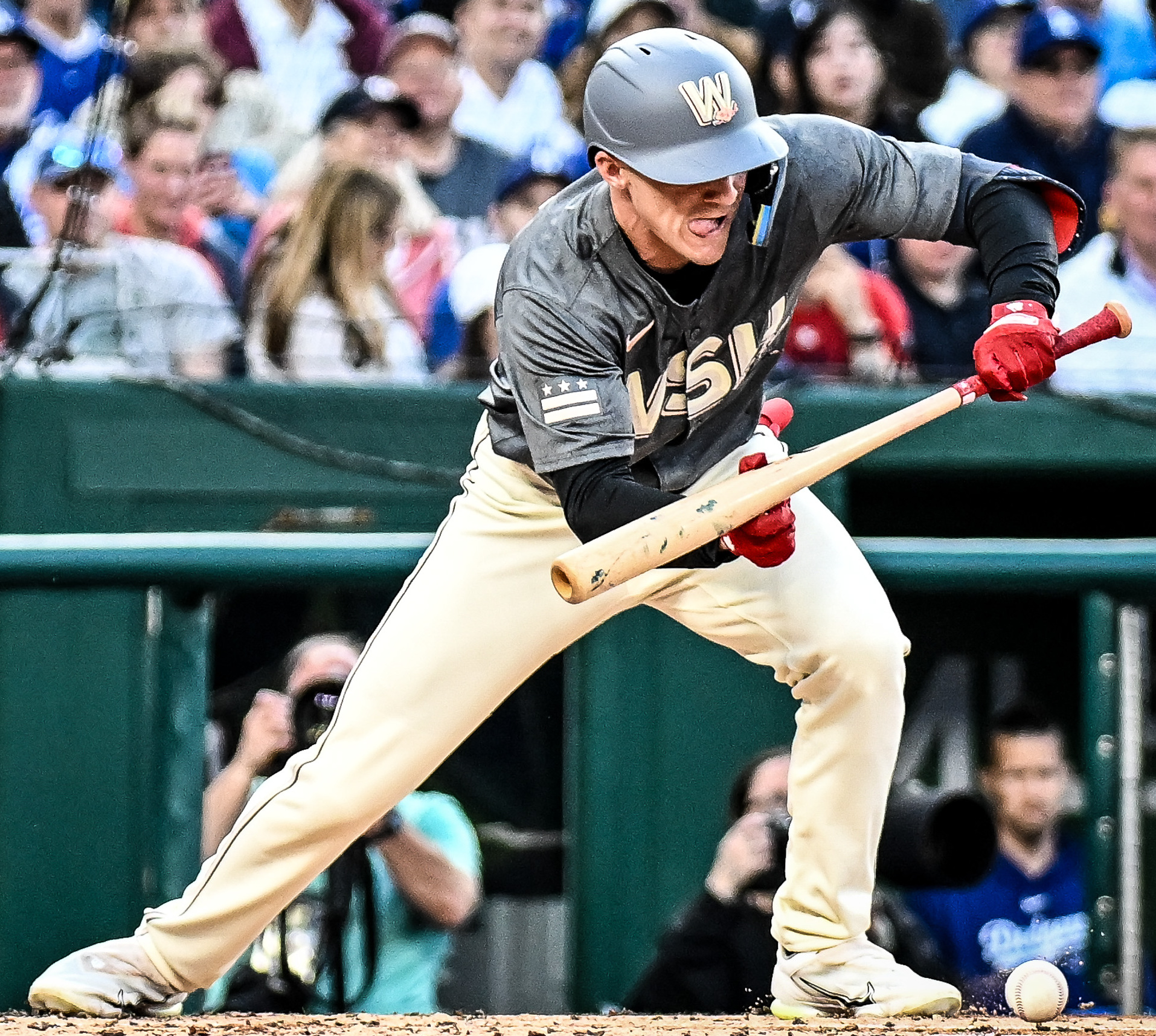
- Young with the Washington Nationals in 2024

Washington Nationals – No. 30
- Center fielder
- Born: July 27, 1999 (age 27); Ponte Vedra, Florida, U.S.
- Bats: Right Throws: Right

MLB debut
- August 26, 2023, for the Washington Nationals

MLB statistics (through 2026 season)
- Batting average: .248
- Home runs: 15
- Runs batted in: 129
- Stolen bases: 79
- Stats at Baseball Reference

Teams
- Washington Nationals (2023–present)

Jacob Samuel Young (born July 27, 1999) is an American professional baseball center fielder for the Washington Nationals of Major League Baseball (MLB). He made his MLB debut in 2023.

== Amateur career ==
Young attended Ponte Vedra High School in Nocatee, Florida, and the University of Florida, where he played college baseball for the Florida Gators. In 131 games across three seasons with the Gators, Young batted .330 with eight home runs and 28 doubles.

== Professional career ==
The Washington Nationals selected him in the seventh round, with the 203rd overall selection, of the 2021 Major League Baseball draft.

Young made his professional debut with the Single–A Fredericksburg Nationals, slashing .208/.283/.267 with five RBI and 13 stolen bases in 26 appearances. Young returned to Fredericksburg in 2022, playing in 115 games and hitting .262/.360/.331 with two home runs, 46 RBI, and 52 stolen bases.

Young began the 2023 season with the High–A Wilmington Blue Rocks, batting .307/.383/.401 with two home runs, 28 RBI, and 22 stolen bases in 56 games. On June 17, 2023, he was promoted to the Double–A Harrisburg Senators. In 52 games for the Senators, he hit .304/.374/.431 with three home runs, 28 RBI, and 17 stolen bases. On August 20, Young was promoted to the Triple–A Rochester Red Wings.

After playing four games with Rochester, the Nationals announced that Young would be promoted to the major leagues for the first time on August 26, 2023. In 33 games during his rookie campaign, he batted .252/.322/.336 with no home runs, 12 RBI, and 13 stolen bases. He also showed strong defense. Young was optioned to Triple–A Rochester to begin the 2024 season.

On April 4, 2024, Young was recalled to Washington. On June 16, 2024, he hit his first career home run in a home game against the Miami Marlins. For the 2024 season he batted .256/.316/.331, with three home runs, 36 RBI, and 33 stolen bases (5th in the National League). His 11 bunt hits led MLB, his 9 sacrifice hits were second in the NL, his .075 Isolated Power and .331 slugging percentage were the lowest in MLB, and his 35.6% balls hit to the opposite field were the highest among MLB batters. Young was recognized as an elite defender: he was one of three Gold Glove Finalists for MLB center fielders and had an OAA (Outs Above Average), a measure of defensive ability, of 20, the second highest in the league.

For the 2025 season he played in 120 games and batted .231/.296/.287, with two home runs, 31 RBI, and 15 stolen bases. His first home run of the season was a grand slam, the first of his career, on August 26, 2025, in a game against the New York Yankees.

In the 2025 season Young also gained celebrity for a number of notable defensive plays, in which he was variously described as "Spiderman" or "The human highlight reel", by making spectacular catches of fly balls. On May 16, 2025, he made an over-the-fence catch of a fly ball from Ryan Mountcastle of the Baltimore Orioles, robbing him of a home run. On July 2 he made a similar catch, taking a home run away from Riley Greene in the ninth inning of a game against the Detroit Tigers. Three weeks later he made a catch of a fly ball from Will Benson of the Cincinnati Reds, that FanDuel Sports Network analyst Jeff Brantley described as "Crazy... Watch where this ball is. … That ball was probably three feet over the fence." For that play he won MLB's Play of the Week. On September 21, in a game against the New York Mets, Young made two highlight-reel catches in one game: the first was what was described as an "unreal circus catch" of a fly ball at the wall, in which he momentarily caught the ball, bobbled it, then kicked it to himself to finalize the catch. For that play he won the MLB Play of the Week again. Later in the same game he made another top-of-the-wall catch of a fly ball in the ninth inning, saving a win for the Nationals. The next day he made yet another diving bobbled bare-hand catch, of a line drive off Atlanta Braves shortstop Ha-Seong Kim.

For the 2025 season Young finished 12th in the league in OAA, putting him in the 96th percentile. He also was named the Nationals’ recipient of the 2025 Heart & Hustle Award by the MLB Players Alumni Association.

At the end of the 2026 season, the Nationals signed Young to a four-year contract extension, with a team option for the 2031 season.

== Personal life ==
On December 10, 2022, Young got engaged to Caroline. The couple got married on December 9, 2023.
