= Ricky Karcher =

American baseball player (born 1997)

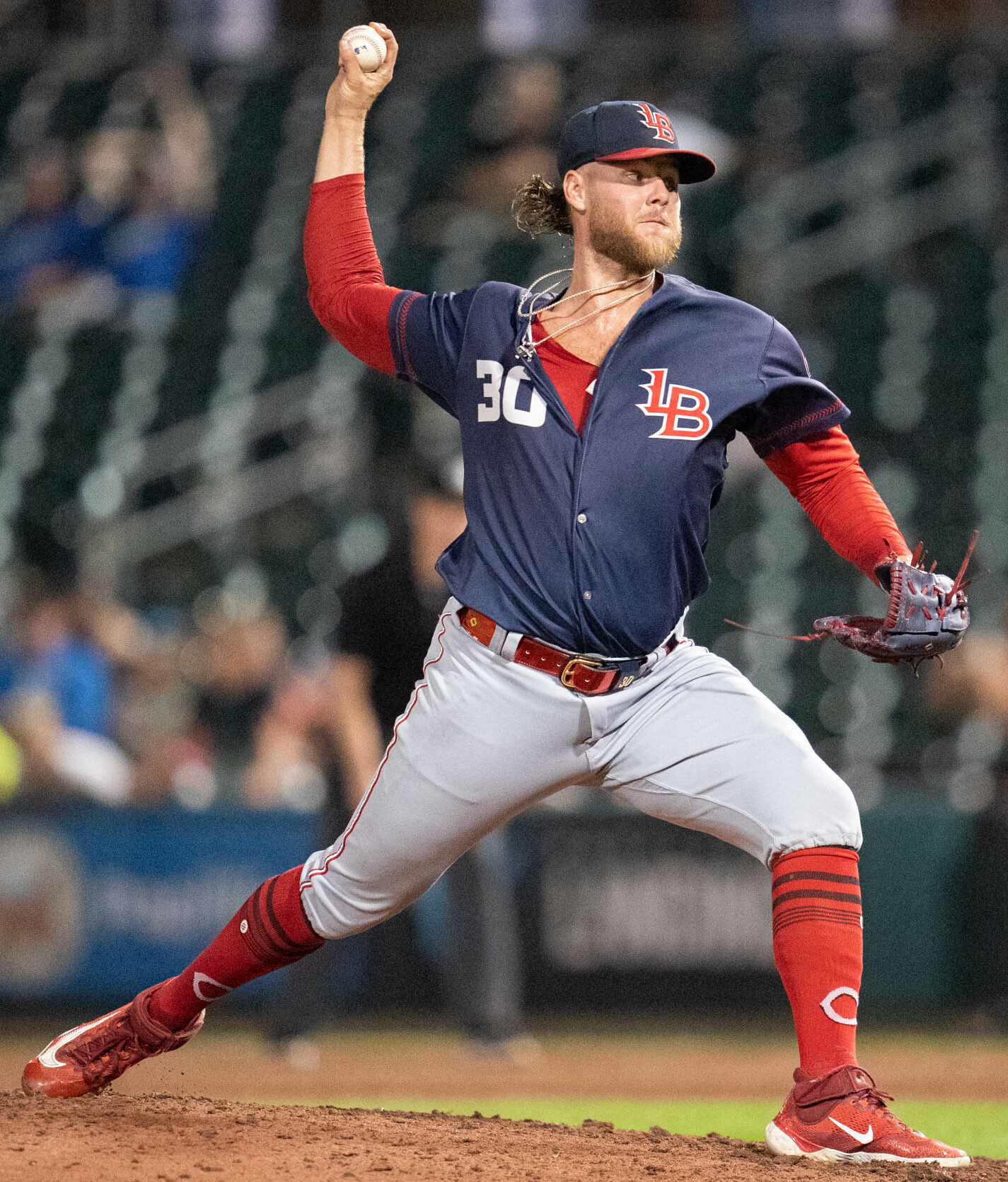
- Karcher with the Louisville Bats in 2023

Free agent
- Pitcher
- Born: September 18, 1997 (age 28); Saline, Michigan, U.S.
- Bats: Right Throws: Right

MLB debut
- June 12, 2023, for the Cincinnati Reds

MLB statistics (through 2023 season)
- Win–loss record: 0–0
- Earned run average: 0.00
- Strikeouts: 0
- Stats at Baseball Reference

Teams
- Cincinnati Reds (2023)

Richard Thomas Karcher (born September 18, 1997) is an American professional baseball pitcher who is a free agent. He has previously played in Major League Baseball (MLB) for the Cincinnati Reds.

== Early life and amateur career ==
Karcher grew up in Ponte Vedra, Florida, and initially attended Ponte Vedra High School. Prior to his senior year of high school his family relocated to Saline, Michigan, and he transferred to Saline High School. In his lone season at Saline, Karcher had a 9–0 win–loss record with 0.41 earned run average (ERA).

Karcher enrolled at the University of Michigan and began his college baseball career with the Michigan Wolverines. After his freshman season, he transferred to Walters State Community College. Karcher went 7–3 with a 4.27 ERA in 15 appearances with 12 starts in his lone season at Walters State.

== Professional career ==
=== Cincinnati Reds ===
The Cincinnati Reds selected Karcher in the 13th round of the 2017 Major League Baseball draft. He spent his first three seasons with the team primarily as a starting pitcher and was assigned to the Arizona League Reds, Greeneville Reds, and Billings Mustangs. Karcher did not play in a game in 2020 due to the cancellation of the minor league season because of the COVID-19 pandemic.

He began the 2021 season with the Daytona Tortugas of Low-A Southeast and was moved to the bullpen. He made nine appearances and struck out 19 batters with Daytona before being promoted to the High-A Dayton Dragons. Karcher was assigned to the Double-A Chattanooga Lookouts at the start of the 2022 season. He was promoted to the Triple-A Louisville Bats after posting a 3.24 ERA with 42 strikeouts in 25 innings pitched. On November 15, 2022, the Reds added Karcher to their 40-man roster to protect him from the Rule 5 draft.

Karcher was optioned to the Triple-A Louisville Bats to begin the 2023 season. On June 9, 2023, he was promoted to the major leagues for the first time after Graham Ashcraft was placed on the injured list. Karcher made his debut on June 12, 2023, in the 10th inning of the Reds' 5–4 victory over the Kansas City Royals and earned the save after pitching a scoreless inning to end the game. In 29 appearances for Louisville, he struggled to a 7.18 ERA with 36 strikeouts and 2 saves in 31 1/3 innings pitched. On July 6, Karcher was designated for assignment after Tony Santillan was activated from the injured list. He cleared waivers and was sent outright to Triple–A Louisville on July 10. Karcher elected free agency following the season on November 6.

=== Arizona Diamondbacks ===
On November 17, 2023, Karcher signed a minor league contract with the Arizona Diamondbacks. In 21 games for the Triple–A Reno Aces, he struggled to an 8.46 ERA with 31 strikeouts across 22 1/3 innings pitched. On June 16, 2024, Karcher was released by the Diamondbacks organization.

=== Kansas City Royals ===
On July 4, 2024, Karcher signed a minor league contract with the Kansas City Royals organization. In 12 appearances for the Double-A Northwest Arkansas Naturals, he compiled an 0-1 record and 5.56 ERA with 11 strikeouts across 11 1/3 innings pitched. Karcher elected free agency following the season on November 4.

=== Diablos Rojos del México ===
On February 28, 2025, Karcher signed with the Diablos Rojos del México of the Mexican League. In 12 appearances for the team, he posted a 4-0 record and 5.79 ERA with 16 strikeouts across 14 innings of relief.

=== Saraperos de Saltillo ===
On May 21, 2025, Karcher, Ian Krol, and Alex Claudio were traded to the Saraperos de Saltillo in exchange for Deolis Guerra. In 18 appearances for Saltillo, he posted a 2-1 record and 4.41 ERA with 17 strikeouts and three saves across 16 1/3 innings pitched. Karcher was released by the Saraperos on July 14.

=== El Águila de Veracruz ===
On February 18, 2026, Karcher signed with El Águila de Veracruz of the Mexican League. He made one appearance for Veracruz, taking the loss after allowing one run with no strikeouts and failing to record an out. Karcher was released by the team on April 29.
