= Palm Valley, Florida =

- CDP
- Nicknames: "PV"
- Location in St. Johns County and the state of Florida
- Coordinates: 30°12′24″N 81°23′14″W
- Country: United States
- State: Florida
- County: St. Johns

Area
  - Total: 13.61 sq mi (35.25 km^{2})
  - Land: 12.20 sq mi (31.59 km^{2})
  - Water: 1.41 sq mi (3.66 km^{2})
- Elevation: 0 ft (0 m)

Population (2020)
  - Total: 21,827
  - Density: 1,789.7/sq mi (691.01/km^{2})
- Time zone: UTC-5 (Eastern (EST))
  - Summer (DST): UTC-4 (EDT)
- Postal code: 32082
- Area code: 904
- FIPS code: 12-54525
- GNIS feature ID: 2403392

Palm Valley is a census-designated place (CDP) on San Pablo Island in St. Johns County, Florida, United States. The population on this part of the island was 21,827 at the 2020 census, up from 20,019 at the 2010 census. It is part of the Jacksonville, Florida Metropolitan Statistical Area.

== History ==
Long before the first Spanish settlers arrived, there was an Indian village in what is known as Palm Valley today. Several Indian mounds have been uncovered revealing points, pottery and human skeletons. Early Franciscan missionaries constructed a mission in the area called The Nativity of Our Lady of Tolomato.

By 1703, Don Diego Espinoza had settled in what is today the Palm Valley area. His vast ranch and the surrounding territory was known as Diego Plains. In the 1730s, the ranch was fortified to protect its inhabitants from Indian attack. By 1739, Great Britain and Spain were at war and trouble was brewing for the Diego Plains settlers. British general James Oglethorpe was commissioned to harass the Spanish settlements south of the colony of Georgia, so the Spanish governor fortified the Diego farmhouse which was already being called Fort San Diego. After Oglethorpe’s failure to capture St. Augustine, the Spanish military abandoned Fort San Diego, but other inhabitants moved into the area, living off the land and the cattle.

In 1908, a canal was dug through Diego Plains connecting the San Pablo River to the north with the Tolomato River near St. Augustine to the south. This intracoastal canal made access to the valley much easier for the residents that had settled in this area. In addition to raising cattle, they farmed, logged, and sold palm fronds to religious groups. The many palm trees growing in the region led some of the settlers to decide on the name Palm Valley for their community.

Prohibition turned some of the valley residents to another source of income – moonshine. The abundant water supply and deep woods areas in the valley were ideal for the concealment of illegal whiskey distilling. The moonshine industry thrived even after the Volstead Act was repealed in 1933, but the rising price of sugar finally brought the illegal whiskey industry to an end.

Palm Valley remained a quiet area of the Beaches, between A1A and U.S. 1. There were many farms where produce and livestock were raised. The development of the Beaches has also affected Palm Valley. Today most farms in the valley have disappeared, opening the land for luxurious residences overlooking the Intracoastal Waterway.

== Geography ==
According to the United States Census Bureau, the CDP has a total area of 14.0 square miles (36 km^{2}), of which 13.4 square miles (35 km^{2}) is land and 0.6 square miles (1.6 km^{2}) (4.21%) is water.

The Palm Valley Bridge is a recent addition to the neighborhood.

=== Neighborhoods ===
There are approximately six formal neighborhoods with Palm Valleys limited area. These include Palm Valley Landing, Plantation Oaks, Seaside, Odom's Mill, Dolphin's Cove, and part of Sawgrass between A1A and the intracoastal. Sawgrass is the most notable neighborhood out of these, Palm Valley contains the TPC side of Sawgrass that hosts The Players Club golf tournament annually.

=== Topography ===
According to the United States Census Bureau, Palm Valley has a total area of around 14 square miles (36.2 km^{2}). From this, 95.71% (13.4 square miles) is land and 4.29% (.6 square miles) is water. Much of the water in Palm Valley is due to small rivers and ponds, as the intracoastal does not count as part of the total area or total water. Palm Valley is a smaller town placed to the east of the intracoastal and to the west of A1A. It is north of Palm Valley Blvd and south of Butler Blvd. Farther west past the intracoastal lies Nocatee. East of A1A lies Ponte Vedra Beaches. North of Butler Blvd lies Jacksonville Beaches. Farther South of Palm Valley Blvd lies St Augustine Beaches.

=== Climate ===
According to Weather Spark, Palm Valley has a hot season for around 3.8 months, from May 30 to September 22. The cool season lasts for around 3 months, from December 3 to March 3. The wetter season lasts 4 months, from June 2 to October 2. While the drier season lasts for the other 8 months of the year. Palm Valley has extreme seasonal variation in perceived humidity. The humid period lasts for about 6.5 months, from April 26 to November 11. The most humid day of the year, August 5, has humid conditions 100% of the day.

== Demographics ==
Historical population
Census	Pop.	Note	%±
1990	9,960		—
2000	19,860		99.4%
2010	20,019		0.8%
2020	21,827		9.0%
U.S. Decennial Census

=== 2020 census ===
As of the 2020 census, Palm Valley had a population of 21,827. The median age was 49.6 years. 18.9% of residents were under the age of 18 and 25.2% of residents were 65 years of age or older. For every 100 females there were 91.4 males, and for every 100 females age 18 and over there were 88.3 males age 18 and over.

100.0% of residents lived in urban areas, while 0.0% lived in rural areas.

There were 9,344 households in Palm Valley, of which 25.7% had children under the age of 18 living in them. Of all households, 55.4% were married-couple households, 13.8% were households with a male householder and no spouse or partner present, and 26.7% were households with a female householder and no spouse or partner present. About 28.4% of all households were made up of individuals and 13.7% had someone living alone who was 65 years of age or older.

There were 10,016 housing units, of which 6.7% were vacant. The homeowner vacancy rate was 1.8% and the rental vacancy rate was 9.4%.

Racial composition as of the 2020 census
Race	Number	Percent
White	19,199	88.0%
Black or African American	275	1.3%
American Indian and Alaska Native	45	0.2%
Asian	540	2.5%
Native Hawaiian and Other Pacific Islander	9	0.0%
Some other race	245	1.1%
Two or more races	1,514	6.9%
Hispanic or Latino (of any race)	1,310	6.0%

=== 2000 census ===
As of the census of 2000, there were 19,860 people, 8,188 households, and 5,584 families residing in the CDP. The population density was 1,480.8 inhabitants per square mile (571.7/km^{2}). There were 8,648 housing units at an average density of 644.8 per square mile (249.0/km^{2}). The racial makeup of the CDP was 95.84% White, 1.25% African American, 0.17% Native American, 1.29% Asian, 0.03% Pacific Islander, 0.52% from other races, and 0.90% from two or more races. Hispanic or Latino of any race were 2.80% of the population.

There were 8,188 households, out of which 33.2% had children under the age of 18 living with them, 59.2% were married couples living together, 7.1% had a female householder with no husband present, and 31.8% were non-families. 24.7% of all households were made up of individuals, and 6.6% had someone living alone who was 65 years of age or older. The average household size was 2.42 and the average family size was 2.93.

In the CDP, the population was spread out, with 25.0% under the age of 18, 5.5% from 18 to 24, 30.6% from 25 to 44, 26.8% from 45 to 64, and 12.1% who were 65 years of age or older. The median age was 39 years. For every 100 females, there were 94.3 males. For every 100 females age 18 and over, there were 90.6 males.

The median income for a household in the CDP was $68,200, and the median income for a family was $87,847 (these figures had risen to $84,276 and $112,317 respectively as of a 2007 estimate). Males had a median income of $58,152 versus $34,738 for females. The per capita income for the CDP was $42,747. About 2.4% of families and 3.5% of the population were below the poverty line, including 3.0% of those under age 18 and 2.7% of those age 65 or over.

== Education ==
It is in the St. Johns County School District.

Most of the community is zoned to PV-PV/Rawlings Elementary School, while a portion is zoned to Ocean Palms Elementary School. All residents are zoned to Alice B. Landrum Middle School, and Ponte Vedra High School.

St. Johns County Public Library maintains the Ponte Vedra Beach Branch in the CDP.
