= Pontevedra (disambiguation) =

Pontevedra is a city in Galicia, Spain.

Pontevedra may also refer to:

== Places ==
=== Spain ===
- Province of Pontevedra, Galicia
  - Pontevedra (comarca)
  - Pontevedra (Parliament of Galicia constituency)
  - Pontevedra (Senate constituency)
  - Pontevedra (Congress of Deputies constituency)

=== Other countries ===
- Pontevedra, Buenos Aires, Argentina
- Pontevedra, Capiz, Philippines
- Pontevedra, Negros Occidental, Philippines
- Ponte Vedra, Florida, U.S.
- Ponte Vedra Beach, Florida, U.S.

== Sports ==
- Pontevedra CF, a Spanish football team
