= Mario Butler (American football) =

American gridiron football player (born 1988)

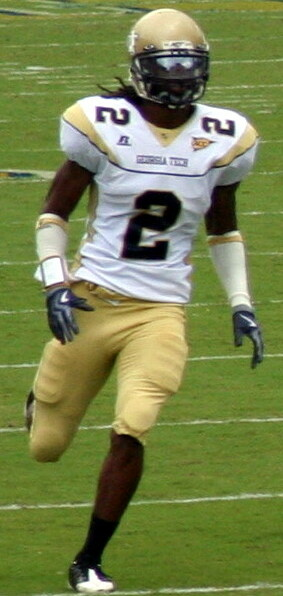
- Butler with Georgia Tech in 2009

No. 31, 39
- Position: Cornerback

Personal information
- Born: October 20, 1988 (age 38); Jacksonville, Florida, U.S.
- Listed height: 6 ft 1 in (1.85 m)
- Listed weight: 184 lb (83 kg)

Career information
- High school: Nease (Ponte Vedra, Florida)
- College: Georgia Tech
- NFL draft: 2011: undrafted

Career history
- Dallas Cowboys (2011−2012); Denver Broncos (2012–2013)*; Buffalo Bills (2013–2015); Calgary Stampeders (2017)*
- * Offseason or practice squad member only

Career NFL statistics
- Games played: 14
- Total tackles: 9
- Pass deflections: 5
- Stats at Pro Football Reference

Mario Antoine Butler (born October 20, 1988) is an American former professional football player who was a cornerback in the National Football League (NFL) for the Dallas Cowboys, Denver Broncos and Buffalo Bills. He played college football for the Georgia Tech Yellow Jackets.

== Early life ==
Butler attended Allen D. Nease High School in Ponte Vedra, FL and was coached by Craig Howard, who helped lead his team to the Class 4-A state title game in his final year of high school. Tim Tebow was quarterback of the team.

He received a number of accolades in his final year of high school which include:

- No. 34 cornerback in the nation by Rivals.com
- No. 62 overall prospect in Florida by Scout.com
- No. 73 overall prospect in Florida by SuperPrep.com
- No. 76 overall prospect in Florida by Rivals.com
- Orlando Sentinel's Top 100 in Florida

== College career ==
Butler accepted a football scholarship from Georgia Tech. He became a starter as a sophomore, registering 41 tackles and one interception. The next year, he posted 45 tackles and 2 interceptions.

As a senior, he collected 47 tackles and one interception. He finished his career with 51 games (39 starts), 136 tackles, 4 interceptions and 12 passes defensed.

== Professional career ==
=== Dallas Cowboys ===
Butler signed as an undrafted free agent with the Dallas Cowboys after the 2011 NFL draft. He was waived on September 3 and signed to the practice squad two days later. On January 3, 2012, he was promoted to the active roster.

He was released on September 22, 2012. He was re-signed to the practice squad on September 26. He was released on October 16.

=== Denver Broncos ===
On October 30, 2012, he was signed by the Denver Broncos to their practice squad. He was released on August 25, 2013.

=== Buffalo Bills ===
On November 19, 2013, Butler was signed by the Buffalo Bills to their practice squad. On August 29, 2014, he was placed on the injured reserve list with an ankle injury.

In 2015, he made the team, playing on special teams and as a backup cornerback. On January 4, 2016, the Bills signed him to a contract extension.

On September 2, 2016, Butler was released by the Bills as part of final roster cuts.

=== Calgary Stampeders ===
On August 15, 2017, he was signed by the Calgary Stampeders to the practice roster. He was placed on the retired list on September 20.

== Personal life ==
Butler is the son of Lisa Lockwood and Jeffrey Butler.
