= Evan Crenshaw =

American football player (born 2004)

No. 28 – Troy Trojans
- Position: Punter
- Class: Redshirt Senior

Personal information
- Born: March 12, 2004 (age 22)
- Listed height: 6 ft 4 in (1.93 m)
- Listed weight: 190 lb (86 kg)

Career information
- High school: Nease (Nocatee, Florida)
- College: Coastal Carolina (2022–2023); Troy (2024–present)

Awards and highlights
- First-team All-American (2025); First-team All-Sun Belt (2025); Sun Belt Conference Special Teams Player of the Year (2025)
- Stats at ESPN

Evan Crenshaw (born March 12, 2004) is an American college football punter for the Troy Trojans. He previously played for the Coastal Carolina Chanticleers.

== Early life ==
Crenshaw was born March 12, 2004, and attended Nease High School in Nocatee, Florida. Playing punter on the school's football team, he averaged 39.4 yards per punt in his senior year. He was rated a six-star punter and the No. 2 punter in the 2022 class by ChrisSailerKicking.com and a five-star recruit and the No. 3 punter in the class by KohlsKicking.com. He was selected to participate in the 2022 All-American Bowl. Crenshaw also competed in baseball at Nease.

== College career ==
Crenshaw began his college football career with the Coastal Carolina Chanticleers. He played in all 13 games in the 2022 season, punting 51 times for 1,975 yards (38.7 yards per punt), the longest for 54 yards. Crenshaw also played in all 13 games in 2023, averaging 41.5 yards per punt, with 37 punts for 1,536 yards.

Crenshaw transferred to play for the Troy Trojans starting in 2024. He took a redshirt for the 2024 season after appearing in three games, recording one punt for 44 yards plus one blocked punt.

In 2025, Crenshaw played in all 14 games, punting 68 times for 3,107 yards, an average of 45.7 yards per punt. Against the Memphis Tigers, he punted 11 times for 530 yards, the most punt yards in a college football game since 2022. He was named the Sun Belt Conference Special Teams Player of the Week after a win against the Buffalo Bulls in which Crenshaw punted five times for 261 yards (52.2 yards per punt), including one for 62 yards and a critical 53-yard punt landing inside the 10-yard line with 4:07 left in the game. In snowy weather during the 2025 Sun Belt Conference Football Championship Game against the James Madison Dukes, James Madison fans threw snowballs at Crenshaw during a punt attempt that would travel only 26 yards, prompting warnings from game officials and James Madison athletic director Matt Roan that fans could be ejected and the James Madison team penalized if the behavior continued. Crenshaw was named first-team All-Sun Belt and the Sun Belt Conference Special Teams Player of the Year for 2025. He was also named first-team All-American by the Football Writers Association of America and The Sporting News, becoming the first Troy player since the program joined the Football Bowl Subdivision to be named to multiple major All-America teams. Additionally, Crenshaw was one of three finalists for the Ray Guy Award, presented annually to the best punter in college football.
