= Alex Claudio =

Puerto Rican baseball player (born 1992)

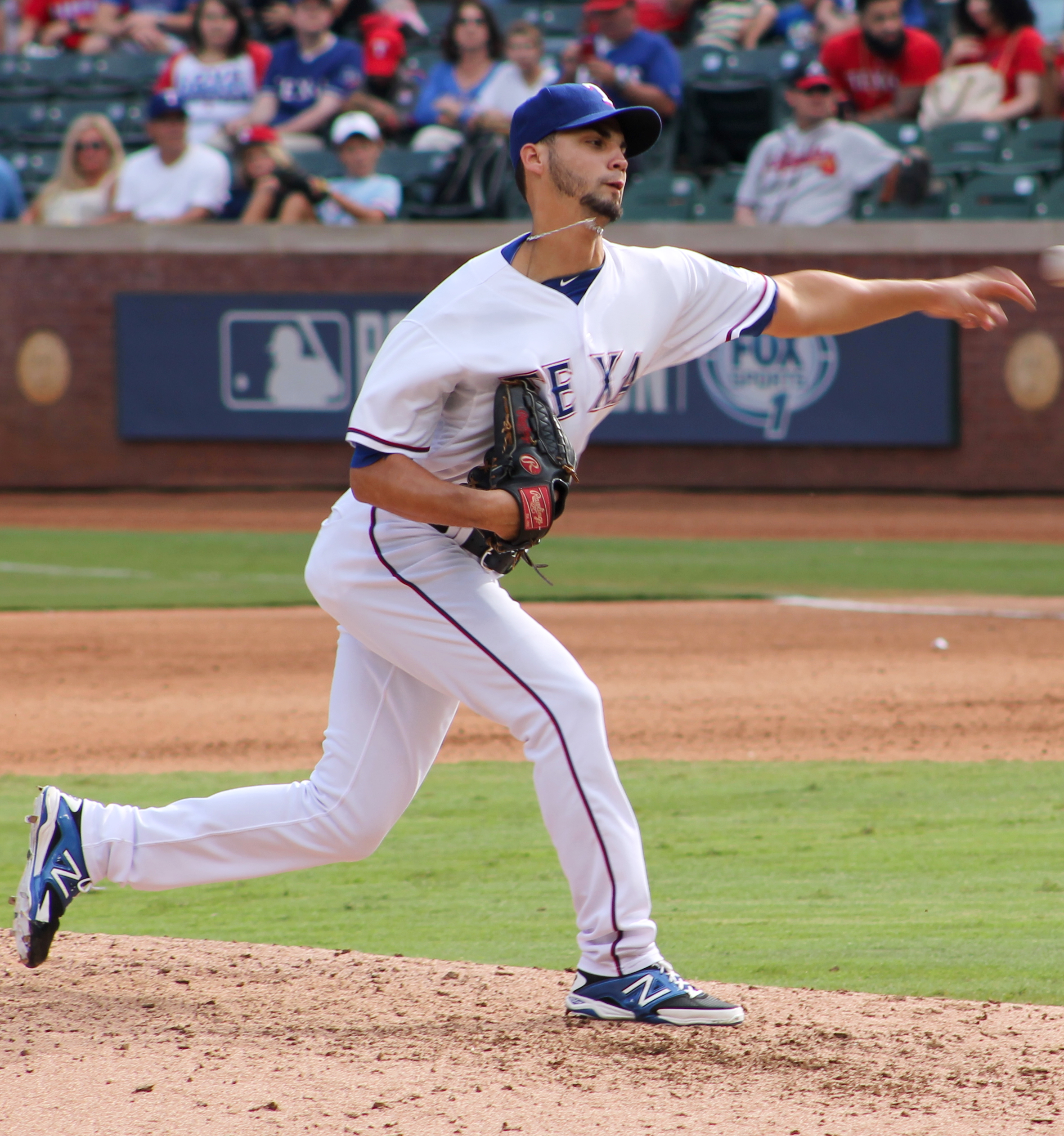
- Claudio with the Texas Rangers in 2014

Saraperos de Saltillo – No. 57
- Pitcher
- Born: January 31, 1992 (age 34); San Juan, Puerto Rico
- Bats: Left Throws: Left

MLB debut
- August 13, 2014, for the Texas Rangers

MLB statistics (through 2023 season)
- Win–loss record: 16–10
- Earned run average: 3.59
- Strikeouts: 249
- Stats at Baseball Reference

Teams
- Texas Rangers (2014–2018); Milwaukee Brewers (2019–2020); Los Angeles Angels (2021); New York Mets (2022); Milwaukee Brewers (2023)
Medals
Men's baseball
Representing Puerto Rico
World Baseball Classic
| Silver medal – second place | 2017 Los Angeles | National team |

Alexander Claudio (born January 31, 1992) is a Puerto Rican professional baseball pitcher for the Saraperos de Saltillo of the Mexican League. He has previously played in Major League Baseball (MLB) for the Texas Rangers, Milwaukee Brewers, Los Angeles Angels, and New York Mets. Claudio pitches in an unorthodox sidearm manner.

== Career ==
=== Texas Rangers ===
Claudio attended Isabel Flores High School in Juncos, Puerto Rico. Claudio was drafted by the Texas Rangers in the 27th round of the 2010 MLB draft.

Claudio spent his first professional season of 2010 playing for the AZL Rangers of the Rookie-level Arizona League, going 0–1 with a 6.60 ERA in 15 innings. He split the 2011 season Between the AZL Rangers and the Spokane Indians of the Low–A Northwest League, going a combined 5–0 with a 1.91 ERA over 28 innings. He returned to the AZL Rangers in 2012, going 4–0 with a 1.79 ERA over 45 innings. Following the 2012 season, Claudio converted from a traditional over the top pitching delivery to a sidearm delivery.

Claudio played for the Hickory Crawdads of the Single–A South Atlantic League and the Frisco RoughRiders of the Double-A Texas League in 2013, going a combined 4–6 with a 1.83 ERA over 78 2/3 innings. He split the 2014 minor league season between the Myrtle Beach Pelicans of the High–A Carolina League, Frisco, and the Round Rock Express of the Triple-A Pacific Coast League, combining to go 6–3 with a 1.66 ERA over 91 1/3 innings.

The Rangers selected Claudio's contract and promoted him to the major leagues for the first time on August 13, 2014. He pitched a scoreless inning, and struck out Kevin Kiermaier for his first major league strikeout in his debut that night. He went 0–0 with a 2.92 ERA over 12 innings for Texas in 2014.

Claudio split the 2015 season between Texas and Round Rock. With the Rangers, he went 1–1 with a 2.87 ERA over 15.2 innings. With Round Rock, he went 3–1 with a 2.93 ERA over 40 innings. Claudio once again split the season between Texas and Round Rock in 2016. With the Rangers, he went 4–1 with a 2.79 ERA in 51 2/3 innings. With Round Rock, he went 0–0 with a 0.55 ERA in 16 innings.

Claudio was named the 2017 Texas Rangers Pitcher of the Year, following a season where he posted a 4–1 record with a 2.50 ERA, 56 strikeouts, and 11 saves over 82 2/3 innings in 70 games.

In 2018, Claudio went 4–2 with a 4.48 ERA over 68 innings. Right-handed batters had a higher batting average against him, .359, than against all other MLB pitchers in 30 or more innings.

=== Milwaukee Brewers ===
Claudio was traded to the Milwaukee Brewers on December 13, 2018, in exchange for a competitive balance Round A draft pick. In 2019, he posted a 2–2 record with a 4.06 ERA over 62 innings. He led all major league pitchers in games played (83). Claudio was non-tendered and became a free agent on December 2, 2019. He re-signed with Milwaukee on a one-year contract on December 9, 2019. Claudio made 20 appearances for the Brewers in 2020, recording a 4.26 ERA with 15 strikeouts and 6 walks in 19.0 innings of work. On December 2, 2020, Claudio was non-tendered by the Brewers and became a free agent.

=== Los Angeles Angels ===
On December 16, 2020, Claudio signed a one-year, $1.125 million deal with the Los Angeles Angels. On July 25, 2021, Claudio was designated for assignment by the Angels after struggling to a 5.51 ERA across 41 appearances. He was released on July 30.

=== Boston Red Sox ===
On August 10, 2021, Claudio signed minor league deal with the Boston Red Sox. He was assigned to the Triple-A Worcester Red Sox. Claudio made 8 appearances for Worcester, recording a 6.17 ERA with 13 strikeouts. On September 21, the Red Sox released Claudio.

=== New York Mets ===
On January 13, 2022, Claudio signed a minor league contract with the New York Mets. He had his contract selected on September 7. On September 30, Claudio was designated for assignment. He cleared waivers and was sent outright to the Triple–A Syracuse Mets on October 6, and elected free agency less than a week later on October 12.

=== Milwaukee Brewers (second stint) ===
On January 3, 2023, Claudio signed a minor league contract with the Milwaukee Brewers organization. He was assigned to the Triple-A Nashville Sounds to begin the year, where he posted a 3.00 ERA with 5 strikeouts and 2 walks in 7 appearances. On April 24, 2023, Claudio was selected to the active roster. He only made one appearance for the Brewers, allowing no runs on two hits with no strikeouts in 1/3 of an inning. On May 27, Claudio was designated for assignment following the promotion of Andruw Monasterio. He cleared waivers and was sent outright to Triple-A Nashville two days later. On October 13, Claudio elected free agency.

=== Diablos Rojos del México ===
On February 8, 2024, Claudio signed with the Diablos Rojos del México of the Mexican League. In 32 appearances, he compiled a 2–3 record and 4.55 ERA with 18 strikeouts across 27 2/3 innings of relief. With the team, Claudio won the Serie del Rey.

Claudio made 12 appearances for Saltillo during the 2025 campaign, registering a 2-0 record and 9.49 ERA with seven strikeouts across 12 1/3 innings pitched.

=== Saraperos de Saltillo ===
On May 21, 2025, Claudio, Ricky Karcher, and Ian Krol were traded to the Saraperos de Saltillo in exchange for Deolis Guerra. In 30 games 24 innings of relief he went 1-0 with a 4.13 ERA and 15 strikeouts.

== International career ==
Claudio was a member of the 2017 Puerto Rico national baseball team in the 2017 World Baseball Classic.

== See also ==
- List of Major League Baseball players from Puerto Rico
