= Deolis Guerra =

Venezuelan baseball player (born 1989)

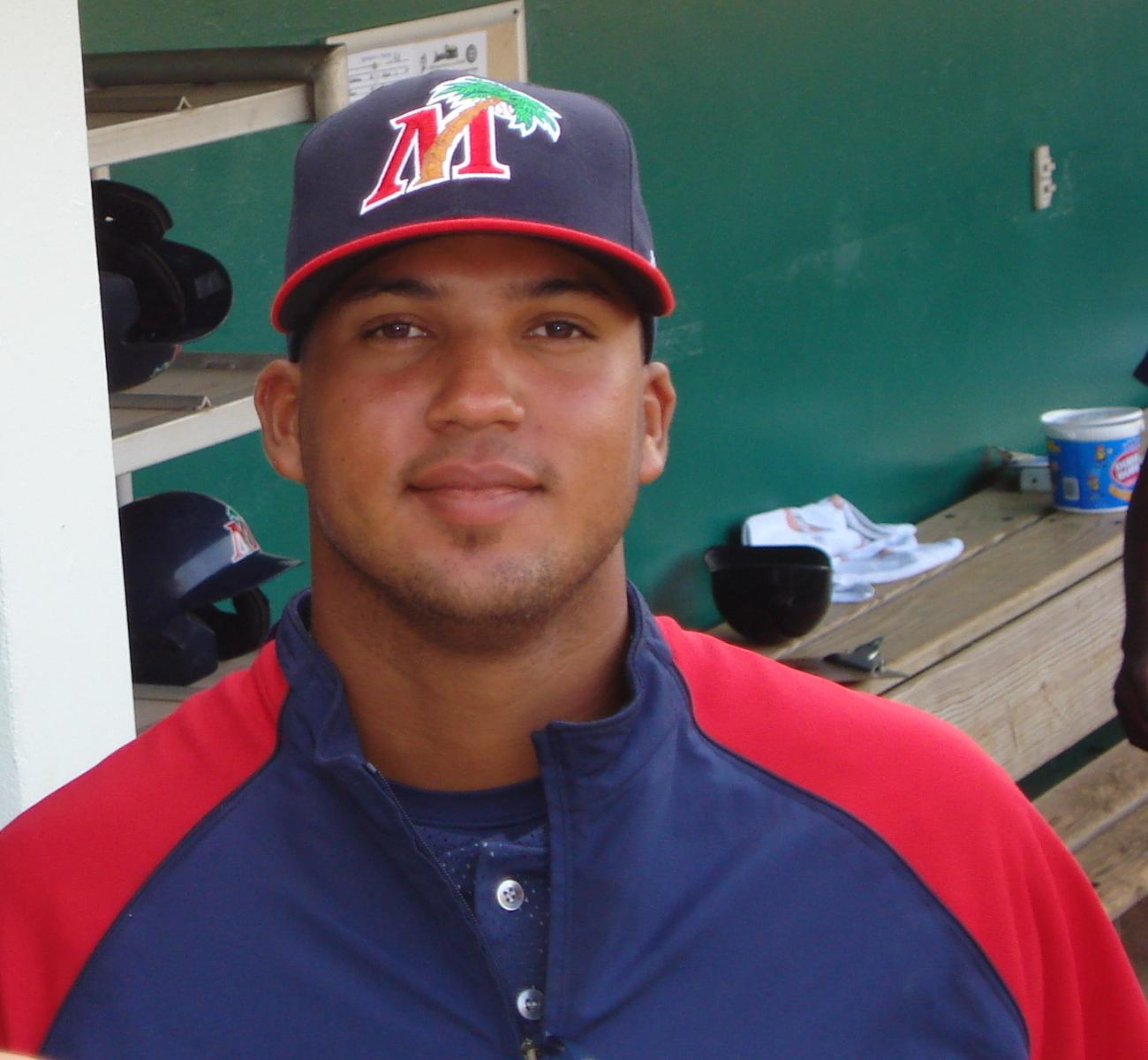
- Guerra with the Fort Myers Miracle

Saraperos de Saltillo – No. 59
- Pitcher
- Born: April 17, 1989 (age 37); San Félix, Venezuela
- Bats: Right Throws: Right

MLB debut
- June 27, 2015, for the Pittsburgh Pirates

MLB statistics (through 2021 season)
- Win–loss record: 12–6
- Earned run average: 4.54
- Strikeouts: 145
- Stats at Baseball Reference

Teams
- Pittsburgh Pirates (2015); Los Angeles Angels (2016–2017); Milwaukee Brewers (2019); Philadelphia Phillies (2020); Oakland Athletics (2021)

Deolis Alexander Guerra (born April 17, 1989) is a Venezuelan professional baseball pitcher for the Saraperos de Saltillo of the Mexican League. He has previously played in Major League Baseball (MLB) for the Pittsburgh Pirates, Los Angeles Angels, Milwaukee Brewers, Philadelphia Phillies, and Oakland Athletics.

== Career ==
=== New York Mets ===
Guerra signed with the New York Mets as a non-drafted free agent on July 2, 2005. He was named South Atlantic League Pitcher of the Week on July 30, 2006. On July 8, 2007, Guerra represented the New York Mets' organization for the World Team in Major League Baseball's All-Star Futures Game.

=== Minnesota Twins ===
Along with outfielder Carlos Gómez and pitchers Philip Humber and Kevin Mulvey, Guerra was traded to the Minnesota Twins for Johan Santana on January 29, 2008.

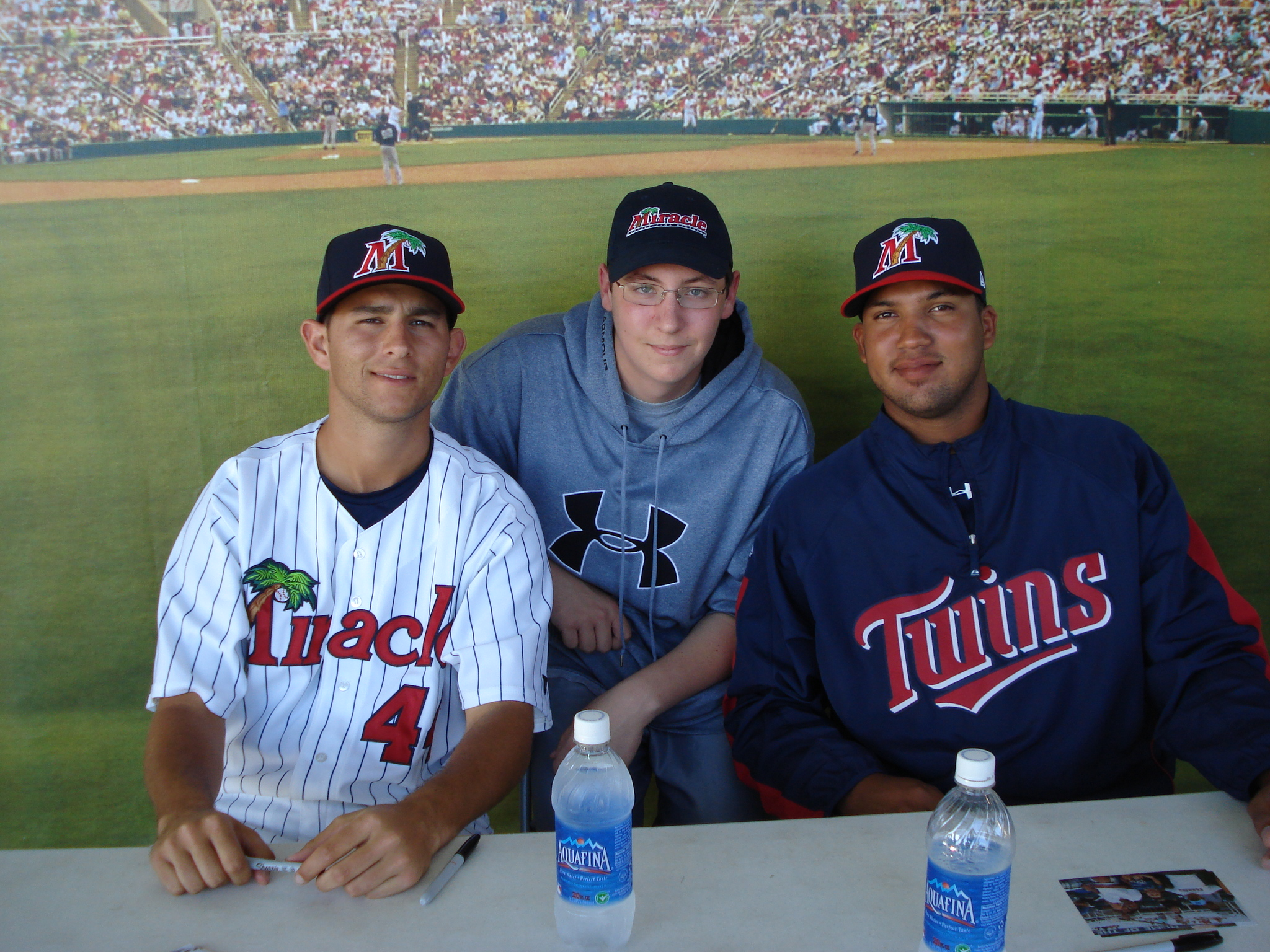
Carlos Gutierrez & Deolis Guerra smile for a picture with an autograph seeking fan

With the Fort Myers Miracle, he compiled a 7–2 record with a 4.83 earned run average in the first half of the 2008 season—helping his team capture the Florida State League (FSL) first-half West Division title. Guerra's first start in the second half of the 2008 season (Tuesday, July 1) was a 4–0 complete game shutout of the Tampa Yankees. He allowed only three hits, and retired 19 in a row between a first inning single by James Cooper and a one-out single by Andres Perez in the seventh. It marked the first shutout of Guerra’ professional career. For the second half, he went 4–7 with a 6.08 ERA in 13 starts.

The Miracle again captured the first half division title in 2009, this time in the FSL's newly realigned Southern Division, and Guerra brought a no hitter into the eighth inning of a July 3 game against the Charlotte Stone Crabs. With one out, Christian López broke it up with a double down the left field line. Guerra was promoted to the New Britain Rock Cats immediately after this game (July 7). He was named FSL pitcher of the week for the week of June 29 through July 5. His combined record for Fort Myers and New Britain was 12–11 with a 4.89 ERA and 106 strikeouts.

On November 20, 2009, he was added to the Twins' 40-man roster. He began the 2010 season with New Britain, going 1–1 with a 3.07 ERA in five starts prior to being promoted to triple-A. During the 2012 season, the Twins converted Guerra into a relief pitcher. The Twins removed Guerra from their 40-man roster after the 2012 season.

Guerra competed for the Venezuelan national baseball team in the 2013 World Baseball Classic. He was hospitalized with a blood clot in his right shoulder in March 2013.

=== Pittsburgh Pirates ===
Guerra signed a minor league deal with the Pittsburgh Pirates in November 2014.

On June 27, 2015, The Pirates promoted him to the major leagues. He was designated for assignment on July 31. The Cleveland Indians claimed Guerra off of waivers, but the claim was rescinded due to Guerra experiencing knee inflammation, and was placed on the Pirates' disabled list. The Pirates designated Guerra for assignment after the 2015 season, but signed him to a minor league contract with an invitation to 2016 spring training.

=== Los Angeles Angels ===
On December 10, 2015, Guerra was selected in the Rule 5 draft by the Los Angeles Angels.

On May 30, 2016, Guerra was designated for assignment, and outrighted to Triple-A on June 3. The next day, the Angels re-selected Guerra's contract, adding him to the 25-man roster.

On February 10, 2017, Guerra was designated for assignment. He cleared waivers and was sent outright to the Triple–A Salt Lake Bees on February 15.

=== Texas Rangers ===
On January 16, 2018, Guerra signed a minor league contract with the Texas Rangers. He made 40 appearances for the Triple–A Round Rock Express, accumulating a 3.79 ERA with 71 strikeouts across 59 1/3 innings pitched. Guerra elected free agency following the season on November 2.

=== Milwaukee Brewers ===
On December 8, 2018, Guerra signed a minor league deal with the Milwaukee Brewers that included an invitation to spring training.

In 2019, Guerra opened the season with the San Antonio Missions. On July 4, the Brewers selected his contract. On July 6, Guerra was designated for assignment. He elected free agency on October 1. On October 18, 2019, the Brewers signed Guerra to a one-year Major League contract. On January 30, 2020, Guerra was designated for assignment following the Brewers' signing of David Phelps.

=== Philadelphia Phillies ===
On February 5, 2020, Guerra was claimed off outright waivers by the Philadelphia Phillies. On August 22, Guerra was designated for assignment by the Phillies. In his time with the Phillies, Guerra pitched to a 1–3 record with an 8.59 ERA over 9 games. Guerra elected free agency on October 14.

=== Oakland Athletics ===
On February 2, 2021, Guerra signed a minor league contract with the Oakland Athletics organization and was invited to Spring Training. On March 26, Guerra was released by the Athletics, but re-signed with the club the next day on a new minor league contract. On April 8, Guerra had his contract selected to the active roster to take the roster spot of the injured A.J. Puk. Guerra made a career-high 53 appearances for Oakland in 2021, pitching to a 4.11 ERA with 62 strikeouts in 65 2/3 innings pitched.

On April 7, 2022, Guerra was placed on the 60-day injured list with a sprained right ulnar collateral ligament. On April 13, it was announced that Guerra had undergone Tommy John surgery, and would miss the entire 2022 season. He was non–tendered and became a free agent on November 18.

On December 15, 2022, Guerra re–signed with Oakland on a minor league deal. Guerra returned to action in 2023 and posted a combined 9.95 ERA in 6 appearances between the rookie–level Arizona Complex League Athletics and Triple–A Las Vegas Aviators. On August 5, 2023, he was released by the Athletics organization.

=== Saraperos de Saltillo ===
On February 8, 2024, Guerra signed with the Saraperos de Saltillo of the Mexican League. In 42 appearances for Saltillo, he logged a 1–1 record and 6.03 ERA with 50 strikeouts over 37 1/3 innings pitched.

On April 26, 2025, Guerra, Kurt Heyer, Mario Meza, Danis Correa, and Ryan Meisinger combined to no-hit the Dorados de Chihuahua. In 13 appearances for Saltillo in 2025, he posted a 1-0 record and 3.31 ERA with 18 strikeouts across 16 1/3 innings pitched.

=== Diablos Rojos del México ===
On May 21, 2025, Guerra was traded to the Diablos Rojos del México in exchange for Ricky Karcher, Ian Krol, and Alex Claudio. In 15 games (four starts) for the Diablos, he posted a 4-0 record with a 3.66 ERA and 32 strikeouts across 32 innings pitched. With the team, Guerra won the Serie del Rey.

Guerra was released by the Diablos following the season on January 6, 2026.

=== Saraperos de Saltillo (second stint) ===
On February 10, 2026, Guerra signed with the Saraperos de Saltillo of the Mexican League.

== See also ==
- List of Major League Baseball players from Venezuela
