= Allen Nease =

American conservationist

Allen Dowling Nease (February 1, 1914 – September 24th, 1984) was a pioneer of Florida’s reforestation and environmental conservation efforts in the mid-20th century.

== Early life and education ==
Nease was born Allen Dowling, but after adoption at ten years old he kept his birth surname as his middle name. In 1935, he graduated with a degree in forestry from the North Carolina College of Agriculture and Mechanic Arts, now called North Carolina State University.

== Career in education ==
In 1971, Nease was elected to the St. Johns County School Board, where he served as chairman for 17 years and became the School Board's driving force for 24 years. While on the School Board, Nease won the battle to build and develop what is now known as the First Coast Technical Institute. For these achievements, the high school, Allen D. Nease Senior High School, was named after him.
