= Ben Nowland =

American football player (born 1980)

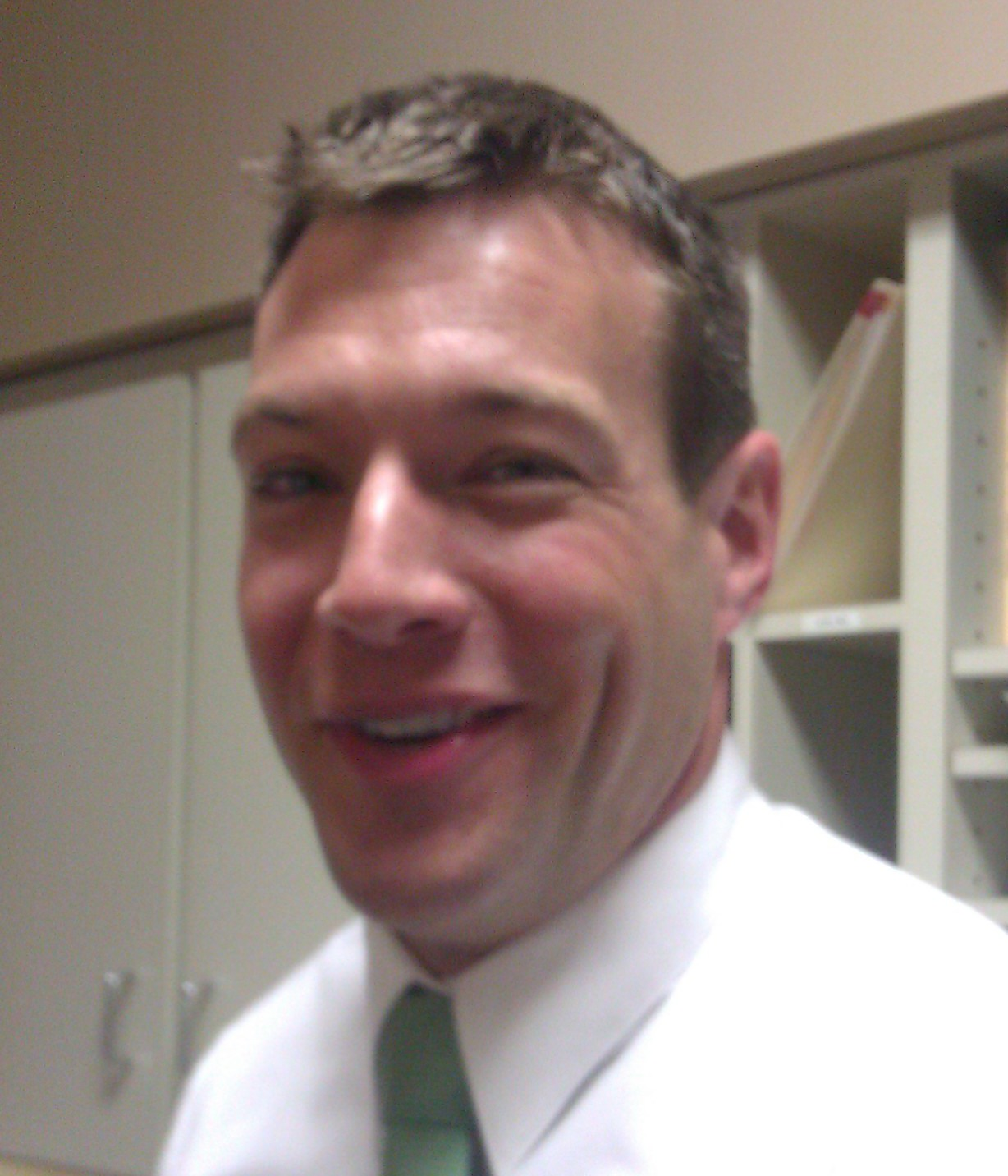

Profile
- Position: Center

Personal information
- Born: May 27, 1980 (age 46)
- Listed height: 6 ft 2 in (1.88 m)
- Listed weight: 300 lb (136 kg)

Career information
- College: Auburn
- NFL draft: 2003: undrafted

Career history
- San Francisco 49ers (2003)*; Carolina Panthers (2003)*; Washington Redskins (2003–2005)*; Frankfurt Galaxy (2004); Denver Broncos (2005)*; Georgia Force (2005); Grand Rapids Rampage (2006–2007); Georgia Force (2007)*
- * Offseason or practice squad member only

Awards and highlights
- First-team All-SEC (2002)
- Stats at ArenaFan.com

Ben Nowland (born May 27, 1980) is an American former football center. He played college football for the Auburn Tigers.

== Early life ==
He attended Allen D. Nease Senior High School in Ponte Vedra, Florida and was a letterman in football, wrestling, and track and field. In football, he was a three-year starter. In wrestling, he won a regional championship as a senior. In track and field, he was a regional champion in the shot put and the discus.

== College career ==
Nowland played collegiately with Auburn. Nowland was a first-team All-SEC center in 2002. He was a top 10 finisher for the Rimington Award which is presented to the nation's best center. Nowland participated in the 2003 Senior Bowl and was awarded with their sportsmanship award for the event. Nowland started 35 games in his career at Auburn. Nowland is married to his college girlfriend Hillary, who now works for Auburn.

== Professional career ==
He entered the National Football League by signing as an undrafted free agent with the San Francisco 49ers in 2003. Waived by the 49ers in August of that year, he was signed to the Washington Redskins' practice squad where he stayed through the 2004 season. In 2004 and 2005 Nowland spent time with the Frankfurt Galaxy in NFL Europa. In 2005, he was signed by the Denver Broncos. He began his AFL career with the Georgia Force in 2005. He joined the Rampage in 2006, but re-signed with the Georgia Force during the 2007 offseason. Nowland retired from football in 2009 and now works as a sales representative.
