= Ponte Vedra Beach, Florida =

Coordinates: 30°14′N 81°23′W

- Unincorporated community
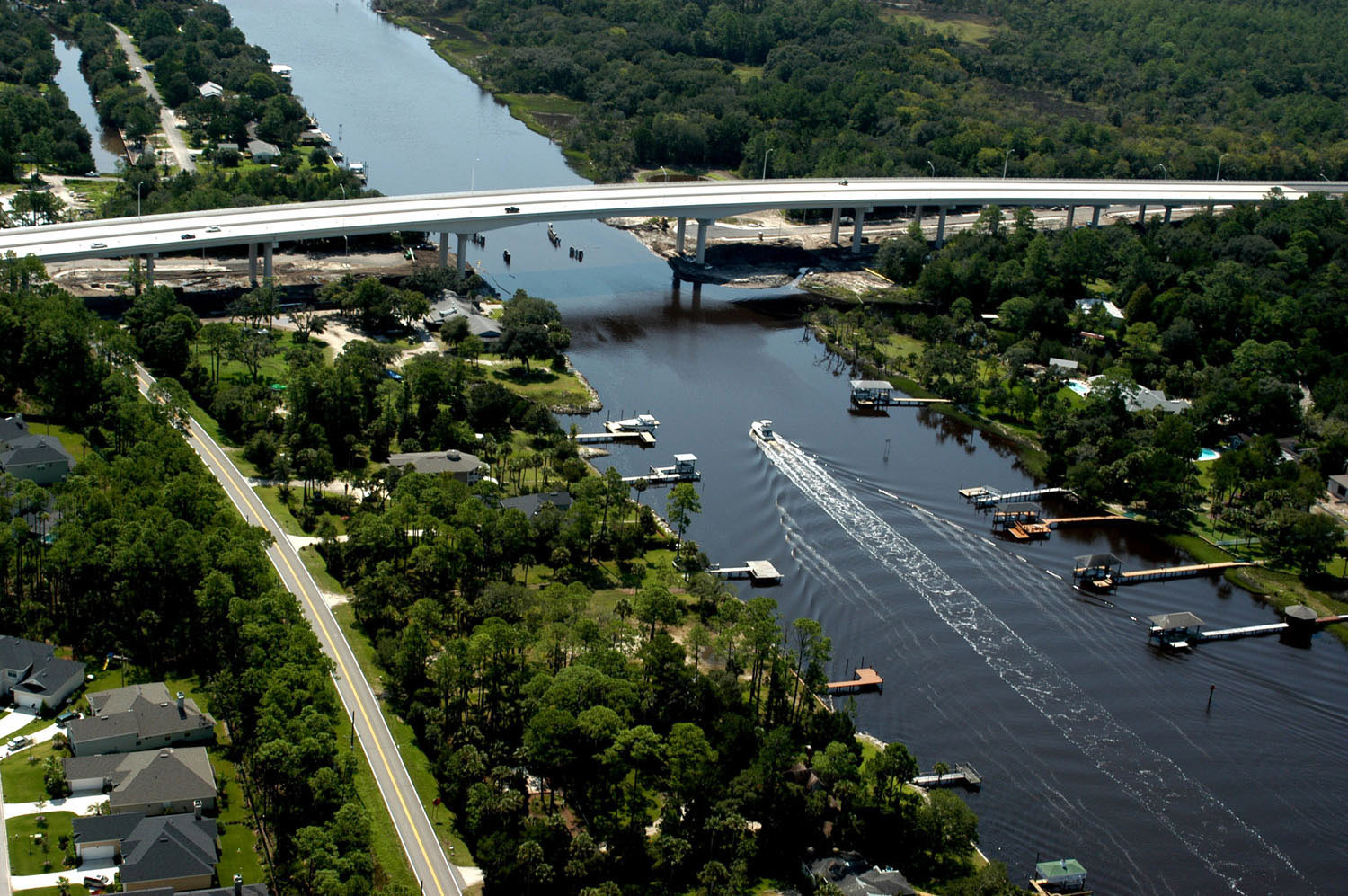
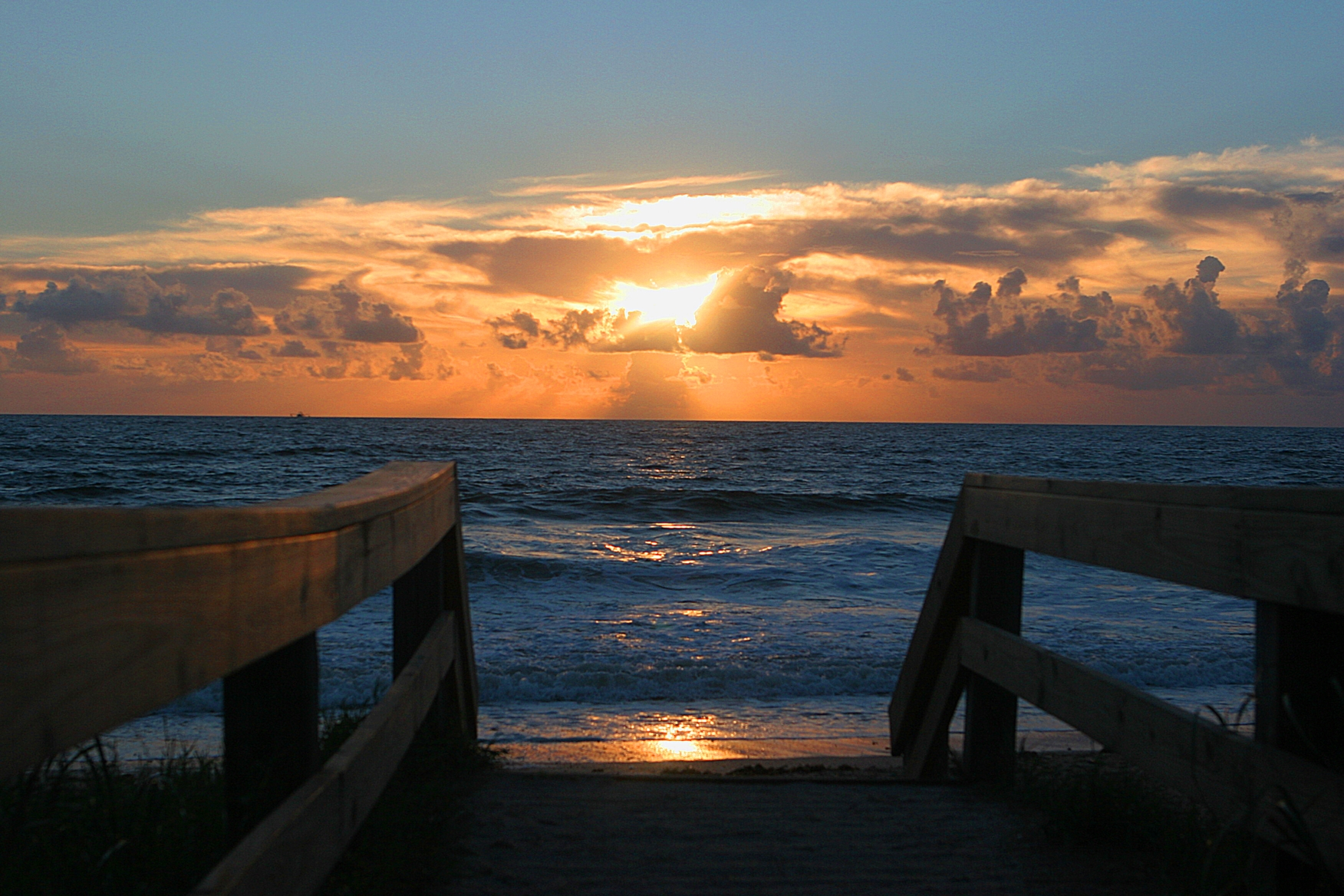
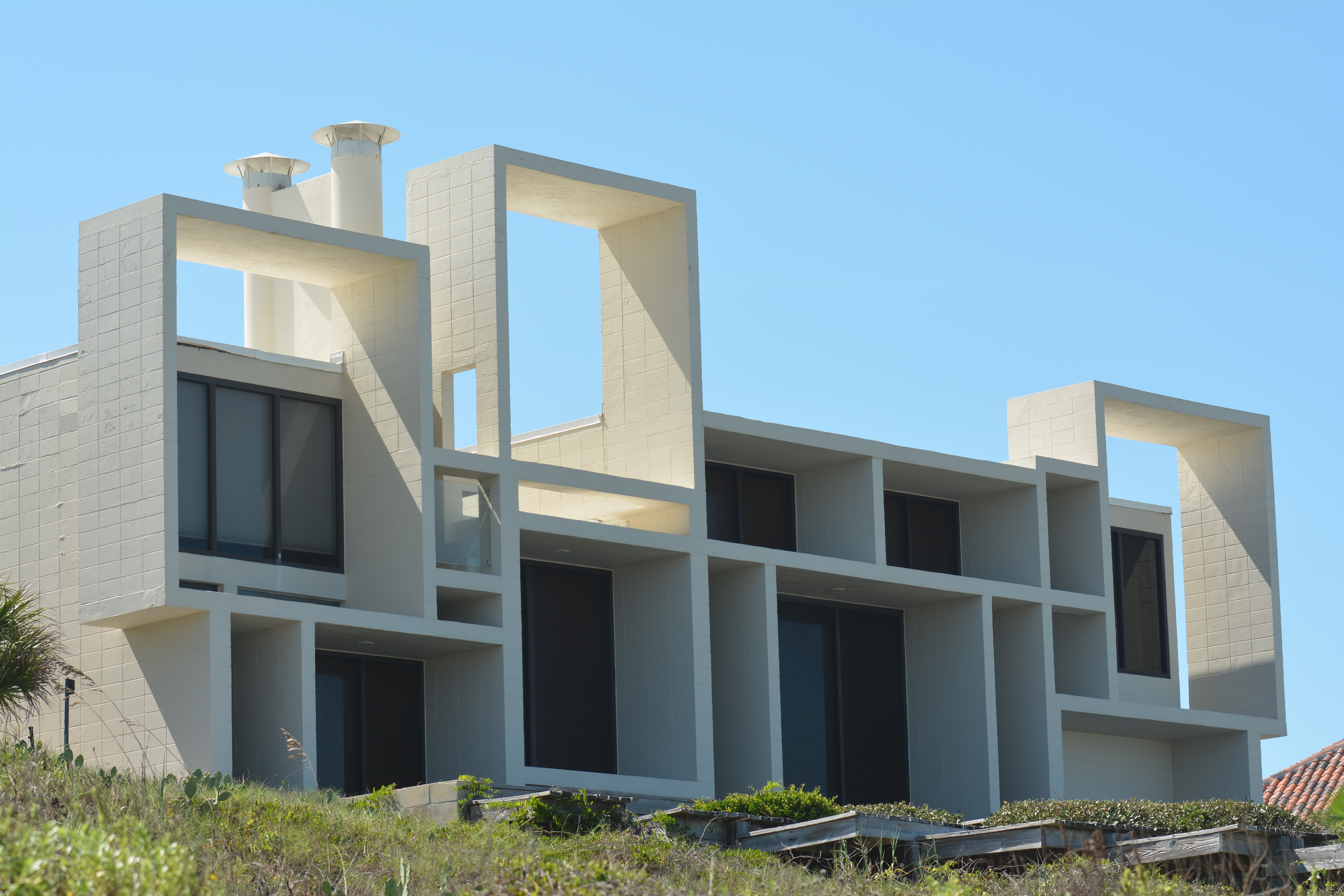
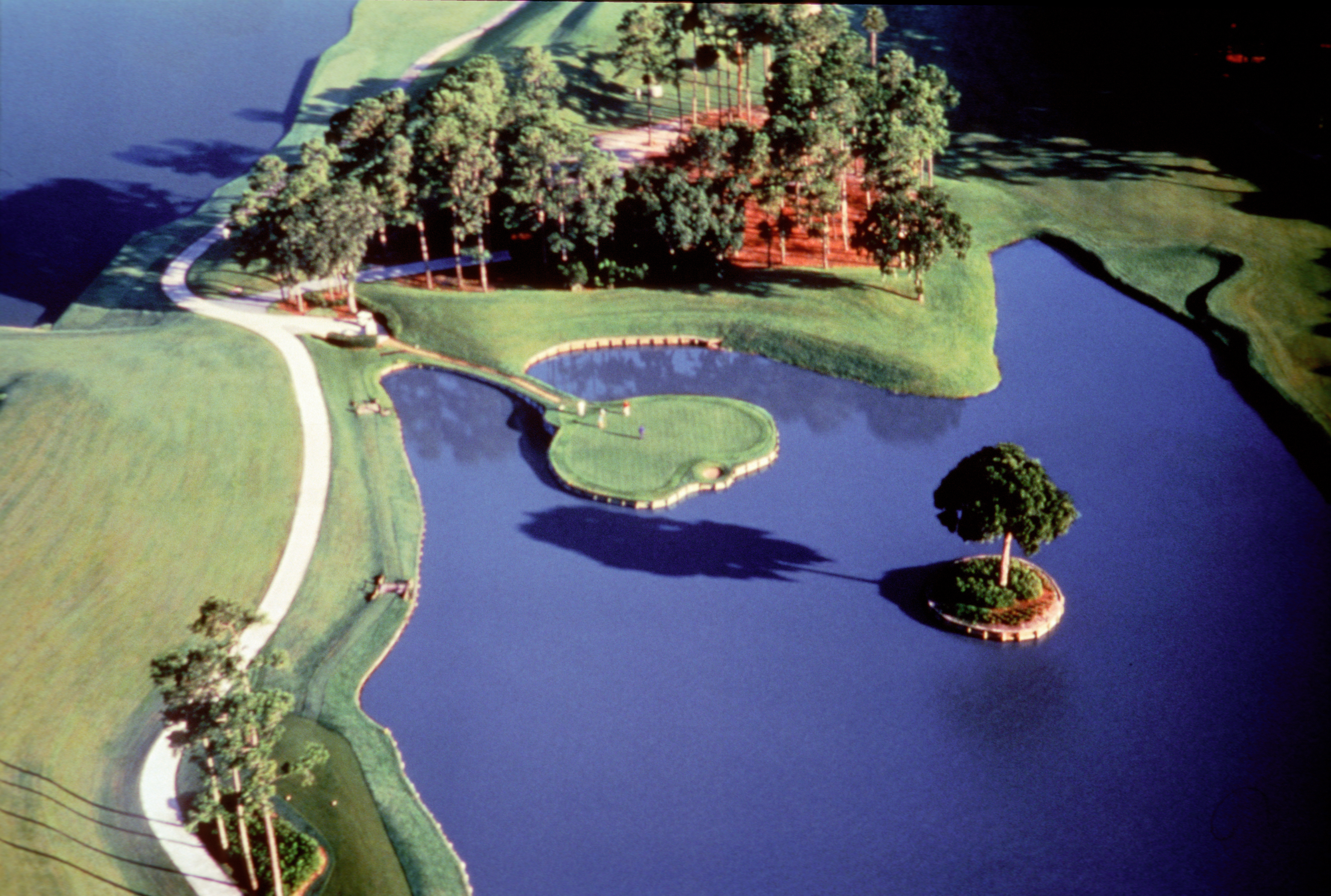
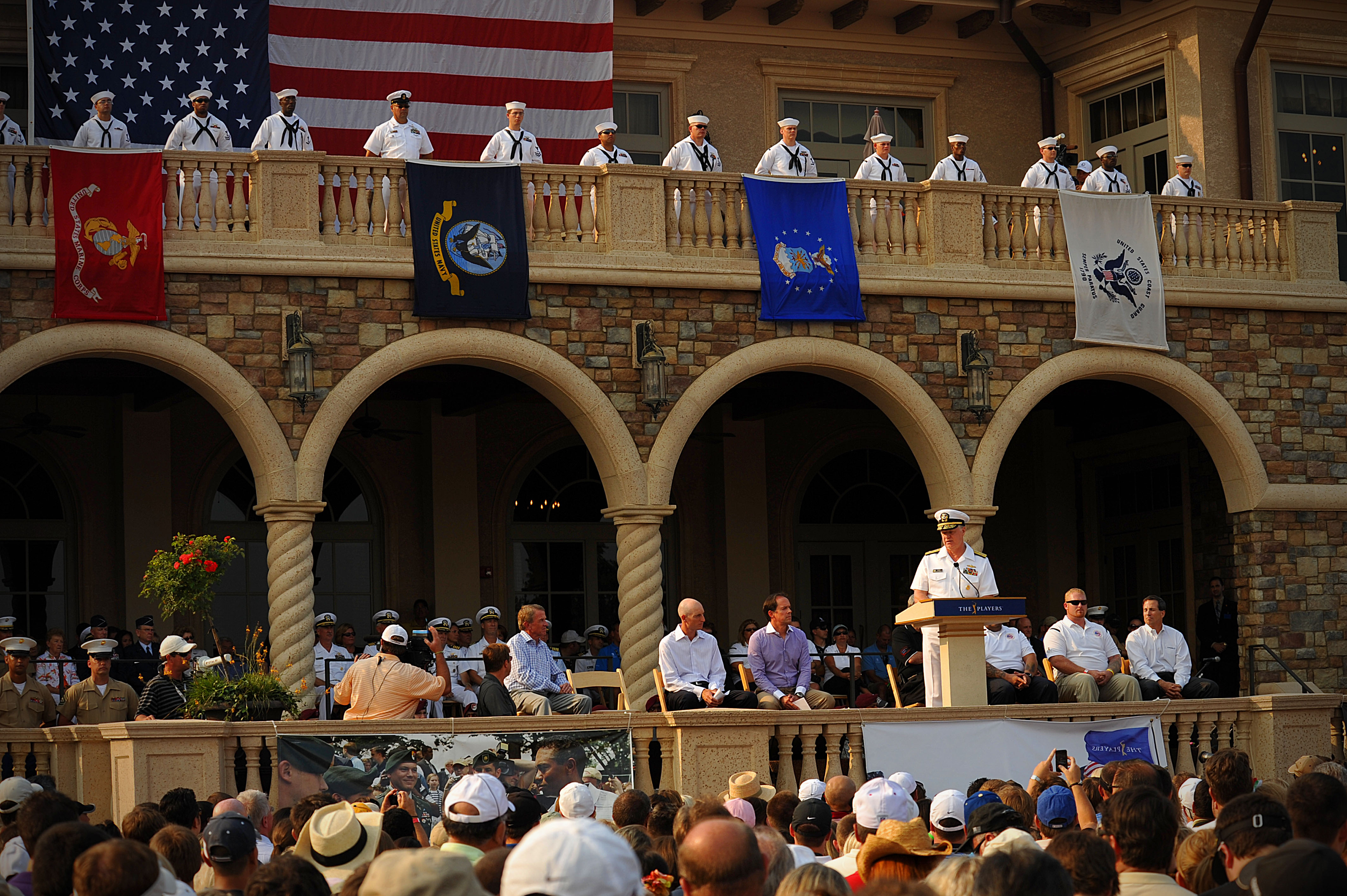
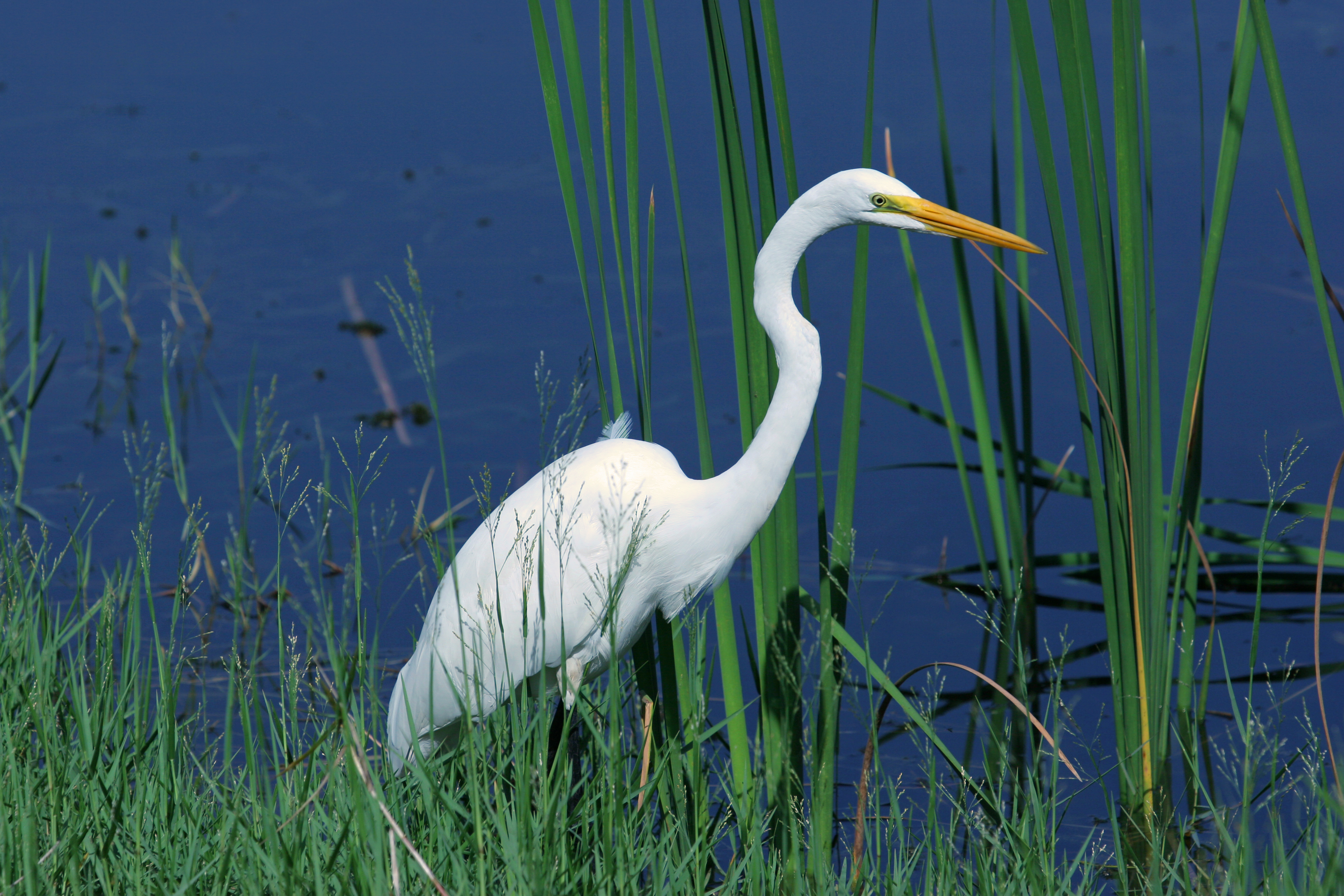
- Left to right from top: Palm Valley Bridge, Sunrise at Ponte Vedra Beach, Milam House, designed by Paul Rudolph, 17th hole at TPC Sawgrass, Military Appreciation Day at The Players Championship, Great White Egret in a local estuary.

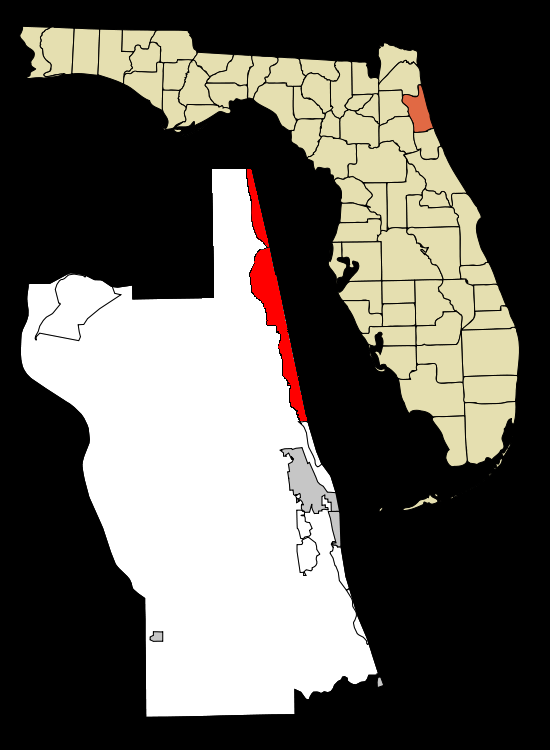
- Location in St. Johns County and the state of Florida
- Country: United States
- State: Florida
- County: St. Johns

Area
  - Total: 33.8 sq mi (88 km^{2})

Population (2016)
  - Total: 29,495
  - Density: 858/sq mi (331/km^{2})
- ZIP code: 32082
- Area codes: 904, 324

Ponte Vedra Beach is a large unincorporated community and suburb of Jacksonville, Florida, located in St. Johns County, Florida, United States. Located in the Jacksonville metropolitan area, 18 miles (29 km) southeast of downtown Jacksonville and 26 miles (42 km) north of St. Augustine, it is part of the Jacksonville Beaches area, and is situated on San Pablo Island.

The area is known for its seaside resorts, including the Ponte Vedra Inn and Club, the Lodge and Club, and the Marriott at Sawgrass. It lies within St. Johns County, which is the wealthiest county in Florida. Ponte Vedra Beach is an upper-income tourist resort area best known for its association with golf and is home to the PGA Tour and The Players Championship, hosted at TPC Sawgrass.

== History ==
The area remained sparsely populated through the late 19th century, even as other seaside communities began to develop to the north. Minerals were discovered in 1914, and a community known as Mineral City grew around the mining operations. These minerals, mostly titanium (ilmenite), zircon, and rutile, were recovered from beach sands by the Buckman and Pritchard Mining Company. The National Lead Company bought Buckman and Pritchard in 1921 and discontinued mining as demand dropped after World War I. In 1929, it began to develop the area to be similar to The Cloister in Sea Island, Georgia. Colonel Joseph C. Stehlin, who had been with the company in St. Louis, arrived on January 1, 1929, to manage development.

The company wanted a more impressive name than Mineral City for its resort, so Colonel Stehlin and his wife, Elizabeth (née Morton), went to the library in St. Augustine to research various possibilities for a new name. Since Florida had been under Spanish rule, they looked on an old map and found the name Pontevedra on the Atlantic coast of Spain at "approximately" the same latitude as Mineral City. (Pontevedra, Spain, however, is over 800 miles farther north at about the same latitude as Boston.) The Galician name of the town was derived from a Roman bridge ("pontis vetera" or "old bridge") that spanned the nearby Lérez River centuries earlier. Colonel Stehlin submitted the name to the National Lead board for approval and Mineral City became Ponte Vedra.

=== Ponte Vedra Club ===
In the early 1920s, the National Lead Company built a nine-hole golf course designed by Herbert Bertram Strong, one of the founders of the PGA, plus a 12-room clubhouse constructed of logs for the use of its employees. After the company left the area, that real estate became the foundation of the Ponte Vedra Club. Stockton, Whatley, Davin & Co., a local developer, became the owner of the Ponte Vedra Corporation in July 1934.

=== World War II ===
During World War II, the German submarine U-584 disembarked four saboteurs at Ponte Vedra as part of the failed Operation Pastorius. The four German spies, all of whom had previously lived in the United States, came ashore on the night of June 16, 1942, carrying explosives and American money. After landing, they strolled up the beach to Jacksonville Beach, where they caught a city bus to Jacksonville and departed by train for Cincinnati and Chicago. The invaders were captured before they could do any damage. They were tried by a military tribunal and executed.

=== Tournament Players Club at Sawgrass ===
In 1972, real estate developers broke ground on the 1,100-acre (4.5 km^{2}) Sawgrass development. In the mid-1970s, Deane Beman, the commissioner of the PGA golf tour, was looking for a permanent home for the Tournament Players Championship. Many places in northern Florida were being considered. In an attempt to bring positive attention to the area, developer Paul Fletcher offered a 400-acre (1.6 km^{2}) tract of land to Beman for $1.

Beman could not refuse this "one dollar deal" for the future home of The Players Championship and the headquarters of the PGA Tour. The Sawgrass Stadium Course has been the permanent home of The Players Championship since 1982.

== Geographics ==
Ponte Vedra Beach is wholly located east of the Intracoastal Waterway, south of the Duval County line, and north of Vilano Beach. The South Ponte Vedra Beach community is commonly considered to be a part of Ponte Vedra Beach. The Ponte Vedra area includes Ponte Vedra, Ponte Vedra Beach, South Ponte Vedra Beach (an area between the Atlantic and Guana Tolomato Matanzas National Estuarine Research Reserve), Sawgrass, and Palm Valley. In June 2006, the U.S. Postal Service designated an area to the south and southwest of the 32082 area as Ponte Vedra (as distinct from Ponte Vedra Beach) and assigned it the ZIP code 32081.

== Demographics ==
Median household income in Ponte Vedra Beach is $150,646 and median family income is $109,181. The median age is 41.8. The Ponte Vedra area is known for being a very affluent area of North Florida, and boasts one of its best school districts. Ponte Vedra Beach was 50th on the list of 100 finalists for CNN and Money Magazine's 2005 "List of the Best Places to Live." It was the first place in Florida to be named in that year, and one of only four areas in the state to make the cut. As of April 1, 2024 the average house costs around $898,000.

== Education ==
Public primary and secondary schools in Ponte Vedra Beach are administered by the St. Johns County School District. Ponte Vedra High School, which functions as the public high school of Ponte Vedra Beach, was constructed to relieve the overcrowding of Allen D. Nease High School. Alice B. Landrum Middle School is the public middle school in the area. The Ponte Vedra Palm Valley-Rawlings Elementary School serves as one of the primary, public elementary schools (kindergarten-grade 5) in the area, as well as Ocean Palms Elementary School.

Ponte Vedra offers private education (kindergarten-grade 8) at the Palmer Catholic Academy. Also, the Bolles School has one of its two lower school campuses in Ponte Vedra Beach, and offers education from prekindergarten to grade 5 before transferring students to the middle and high schools located in Jacksonville.

The St Johns County Public Library System has a Ponte Vedra Beach Branch library.

== Notable people ==
Famous past and present residents of Ponte Vedra:

- Kim Alexis, actress and model
- Jason Altmire, U.S. congressman
- Ehsan Bayat, Afghan American businessman
- Tony Boselli, professional football player
- Caitlin Brunell, Miss America's Outstanding Teen 2008 (daughter of Mark Brunell)
- Mark Brunell, professional football player and coach
- Shelby Cannon, professional tennis player
- Christina Crawford, dancer and professional wrestler
- Ron DeSantis, 46th governor of Florida and former U.S. congressman for 6th district
- Ron Duguay, professional hockey player and coach
- Bob Duval, professional golfer and author
- David Duval, professional golfer
- Tim Finchem, PGA Tour commissioner
- Todd Fordham, professional football player
- Alicia Fox, model, WWE wrestler, actress
- Fred Funk, professional golfer
- Jim Furyk, professional golfer
- Dan Galorath, software developer, businessman and author
- Brian Gottfried, professional tennis player
- Michael Huyghue, United Football League commissioner
- Dan Jenkins, author and sports writer
- Hamilton Jordan, White House chief of staff for President Carter
- Jeff Klauk, professional golfer
- E. L. Konigsburg, author
- Billy Kratzert, professional golfer and commentator
- Matt Kuchar, professional golfer
- Bowie Kuhn, lawyer and former MLB commissioner
- Christian Laettner, professional basketball player
- John Legere, former CEO of T-Mobile
- Mike Lester, cartoonist, illustrator, author
- Frank Lickliter, professional golfer
- Todd Martin, professional tennis player
- Len Mattiace, professional golfer
- Mark McCumber, professional golfer
- Craig McKinley, first National Guard four-star general
- Brian Moorman, former professional football player
- Ben Nowland, professional football player
- Donna Orender, professional athlete and sports executive
- Calvin Peete, professional golfer
- Rick Rhoden, professional athlete
- Fred Rogers, television personality, Mr. Rogers' Neighborhood
- Theodore Roosevelt Jr., general and recipient of the Medal of Honor
- Michael Russell, professional tennis player
- Martin A. Siegel, investment banker
- Vijay Singh, professional golfer
- Nancy Soderberg, foreign policy strategist
- Damien Starkey, musician and entrepreneur
- Tim Tebow, professional football and baseball player
- Bill Terry, baseball Hall of Fame member
- G. Kennedy Thompson, former Wachovia CEO
- Bobby Thomson, professional baseball player, star of the "Shot Heard 'Round the World"
- MaliVai Washington, professional tennis player
- Bobby Weed, golf course designer
- Bob Wenzel, college basketball coach and broadcaster
- Rick Wilkins, professional baseball player
- Betty Williams, Nobel Peace Prize recipient

== See also ==
- Ponte Vedra, Florida
- Jacksonville Beaches
- St. Johns County, Florida
- Greater Jacksonville
- National Register of Historic Places listings in St. Johns County, Florida
