= Ian Krol =

American baseball player (born 1991)

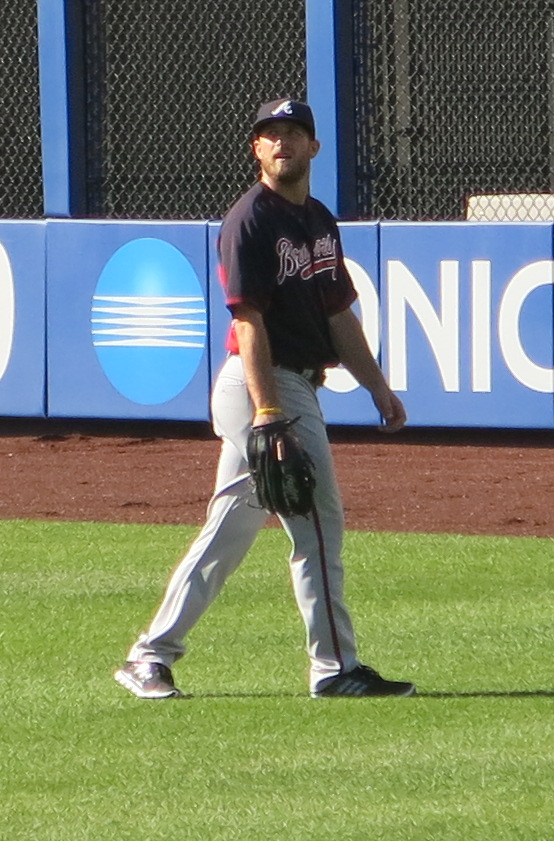
- Krol with the Atlanta Braves
- Pitcher
- Born: May 9, 1991 (age 35); Hinsdale, Illinois, U.S.
- Batted: Left Threw: Left

Professional debut
- MLB: June 5, 2013, for the Washington Nationals
- NPB: July 16, 2022, for the Yomiuri Giants

Last appearance
- MLB: October 1, 2021, for the Detroit Tigers
- NPB: September 28, 2022, for the Yomiuri Giants

MLB statistics
- Win–loss record: 8–6
- Earned run average: 4.49
- Strikeouts: 196

NPB statistics
- Win–loss record: 1–1
- Earned run average: 3.86
- Strikeouts: 15
- Stats at Baseball Reference

Teams
- Washington Nationals (2013); Detroit Tigers (2014–2015); Atlanta Braves (2016–2017); Los Angeles Angels (2018); Detroit Tigers (2021); Yomiuri Giants (2022)

Ian Albert Krol (born May 9, 1991) is an American former professional baseball pitcher. He has previously played in Major League Baseball (MLB) for the Washington Nationals, Atlanta Braves, Los Angeles Angels, and Detroit Tigers, and in Nippon Professional Baseball (NPB) for the Yomiuri Giants.

== Professional career ==
=== Oakland Athletics ===
Krol was drafted by the Oakland Athletics in the seventh round, with the 213th overall selection, of the 2009 Major League Baseball draft out of Neuqua Valley High School in Naperville, Illinois. He was selected despite not pitching in his senior year due to being suspended for the entire season for an alcohol-related offense, his second violation of the district athletic code of conduct (his first violation, in his junior year, led to a seven-game suspension).

After missing time due to an elbow injury, Krol made his professional debut on August 27, starting for the rookie-level Arizona League Athletics. After that, he made three appearances (one start) with the Low-A Vancouver Canadians. Krol played most of 2010 with Single-A Kane County Cougars, where in 24 games (23 starts), he went 9–4 with a 2.65 ERA, striking out 91 in 118 2/3 innings, and was a mid and post-season all-star. He also made four starts for the High-A Stockton Ports at the end of the year, going 1–0. Krol missed the first three months with an elbow injury, and was pitching in a rehab assignment in the Arizona League before he was suspended for the rest of the season—more than two months—for a tweet that included a graphic "gay slur along with some other offensive language".

Krol began 2012 with the Ports as a starter, where in 15 starts, he went 1–7 with a 5.62 ERA. In late July, he was moved to the bullpen to reduce his projected innings pitched total. He performed well in that role, earning a promotion to the Double-A Midland RockHounds. In 29 combined appearances (15 starts), he went 2–9 with a 5.20 ERA, striking out 89 batters in 97 innings.

=== Washington Nationals ===
Krol was acquired by the Washington Nationals in March 2013 as a player to be named later in the trade that sent Michael Morse to the Seattle Mariners, John Jaso to Oakland, and A. J. Cole and Blake Treinen to the Nationals. He was assigned to Double-A Harrisburg to begin the year, where he got off to a hot start. In 21 games with the Senators, he had a 0.69 ERA, striking out 29 in 26 innings.

He was called up to the majors for the first time on June 4, 2013. He made his major league debut the next day against the Mets, striking out the side in one scoreless inning of work. After a short stint with the Triple-A Syracuse Chiefs at the end of August, Krol returned to the Nationals for September. In 32 games with Washington, he went 2–1 with two holds and a 3.95 ERA, striking out 22 in 27 1/3 innings.

=== Detroit Tigers ===
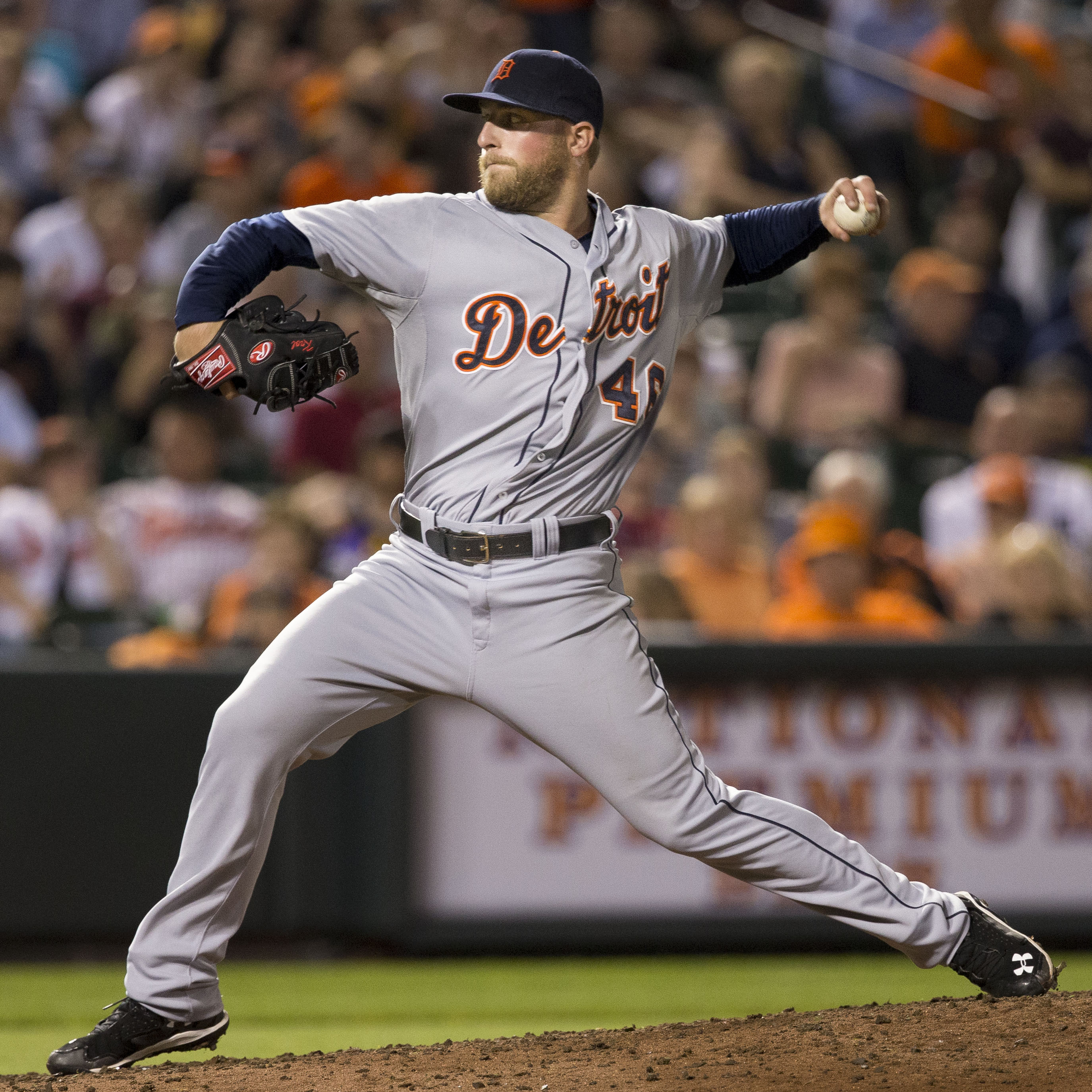
Krol with the Tigers in 2014

On December 2, 2013, Krol was traded to the Detroit Tigers, along with infielder Steve Lombardozzi and pitcher Robbie Ray, in exchange for starting pitcher Doug Fister. On July 31, 2014, Krol was optioned to the team's Triple-A affiliate, the Toledo Mud Hens. In 45 appearances for Detroit during the 2014 campaign, he recorded a 4.96 ERA with 28 strikeouts and one save across 32 2/3 innings pitched.

Krol pitched out of the Detroit bullpen in 2015, shuttling between Toledo and the Tigers throughout the year. He was called up by the Tigers on September 8, 2015, as a September call-up. In 33 total appearances with Detroit, Krol went 2–3 with a 5.79 ERA and 26 strikeouts in 28 innings of work.

=== Atlanta Braves ===
On November 20, 2015, the Tigers traded Krol and pitcher Gabe Speier to the Atlanta Braves in exchange for outfielder Cameron Maybin and cash considerations. He was invited to spring training, and sent down to begin the year with the Triple-A Gwinnett Braves. In 63 appearances for Atlanta during the 2016 campaign, Krol compiled a 2-0 record and 3.18 ERA with 56 strikeouts over 51 innings of work.

Krol pitched in 51 games for the Braves in the 2017 season, registering a 2-2 record and 5.33 ERA with 44 strikeouts across 49 innings pitched.

=== Los Angeles Angels ===
On February 6, 2018, Krol signed a minor league deal with the Los Angeles Angels. He made one appearance for the Major League club, pitching two innings on May 27. The following day, Krol was designated for assignment. He requested and received his release from the organization on May 31.

=== New York Mets ===
Krol signed a minor league contract with the New York Mets on June 10, 2018. He made 25 appearances for the Triple-A Las Vegas 51s, posting a 2-0 record and 3.31 ERA with 39 strikeouts across 35 1/3 innings pitched. Krol was released by the Mets organization on September 2.

=== Cincinnati Reds ===
On January 29, 2019, Krol signed a minor league contract with the Cincinnati Reds that included an invitation to spring training. In 28 appearances for the Triple-A Louisville Bats, Krol logged a 1-3 record and 5.33 ERA with 28 strikeouts and one save across 25 1/3 innings pitched.

=== Minnesota Twins ===
On June 18, 2019, Krol signed a minor league deal with the Minnesota Twins. On August 16, Krol was suspended 50 games for his second positive test for a drug of abuse. In 18 appearances for the Triple–A Rochester Red Wings, he compiled a 5.23 ERA with 30 strikeouts and 8 saves across 20 2/3 innings pitched. Krol elected free agency following the season on November 4.

=== Detroit Tigers (second stint) ===
On December 14, 2020, Krol signed a minor league contract with the Detroit Tigers with an invitation to spring training. He was assigned to the Triple-A Toledo Mud Hens to begin the 2021 season. In 17 games with Toledo, Krol logged a 2.42 ERA with 26 strikeouts. On July 7, 2021, Krol was selected to the major league roster. In 5 appearances for the Tigers, Krol posted a 3.86 ERA with 4 strikeouts. On July 27, Krol was designated for assignment by the Tigers. Krol cleared waivers and was outrighted to the Mud Hens two days later. On July 30, Krol's contract was again purchased from Toledo after the trade of Daniel Norris. In another 7 appearances for Detroit, Krol recorded a 5.87 ERA with 6 strikeouts. On August 27, Krol was designated for assignment once again, as the Tigers activated José Ureña from the injured list. On August 30, Krol cleared waivers and was assigned outright to Triple-A Toledo. On September 11, Krol was re-selected to the active roster. On November 5, Krol was outrighted off of the 40-man roster and elected free agency.

=== San Diego Padres ===
On March 18, 2022, Krol signed a minor league contract with the San Diego Padres, which included an invitation to spring training. In 24 appearances for the Triple-A El Paso Chihuahuas, he struggled to a 7.46 ERA with 33 strikeouts and two saves across 25 1/3 innings pitched. Krol was released by the Padres organization on June 16.

=== Yomiuri Giants ===
On July 19, 2022, Krol signed with the Yomiuri Giants of Nippon Professional Baseball. Krol made 21 appearances for the main team down the stretch, pitching to a 1–1 record and 3.86 ERA with 15 strikeouts in 21 innings of work. He became a free agent following the season.

=== Tecolotes de los Dos Laredos ===
On March 6, 2023, Krol signed with the Tecolotes de los Dos Laredos of the Mexican League. In 2023, he appeared in 41 games, going 0–5 with a 4.19 ERA, 32 strikeouts, and 10 saves across 38 2/3 innings pitched.

In 2024, Krol appeared in 18 games, going 1–0 with a 2.12 ERA and 18 strikeouts across 17 innings of work.

=== Saraperos de Saltillo ===
On June 20, 2024, Krol was traded to the Saraperos de Saltillo in exchange for Marcos Garibay. In 16 appearances for Saltillo, he struggled to a 1–3 record and 9.00 ERA with 10 strikeouts and 4 saves across 15 innings pitched.

=== Diablos Rojos del México ===
On March 3, 2025, Krol was traded to the Diablos Rojos del México of the Mexican League. In seven appearances (one start) for the Diablos, Krol logged a 2-1 record and 4.50 ERA with 10 strikeouts over 12 innings of work.

=== Saraperos de Saltillo (second stint) ===
On May 21, 2025, Krol, Alex Claudio, and Ricky Karcher were traded to the Saraperos de Saltillo in exchange for Deolis Guerra. In 27 games 20 innings of relief he went 0-0 with a 4.50 ERA and 16 strikeouts. He became a free agent following the season.

== Pitch selection ==
Krol throws four pitches. He has a four-seam fastball in the 93–95 MPH range, a cut fastball between 88 and 90 MPH, a curveball between 77 and 79 MPH, and an above-average changeup averaging 83–85 MPH.
