= Allen D. Nease High School =

Public high school in St. Johns County, Florida, United States

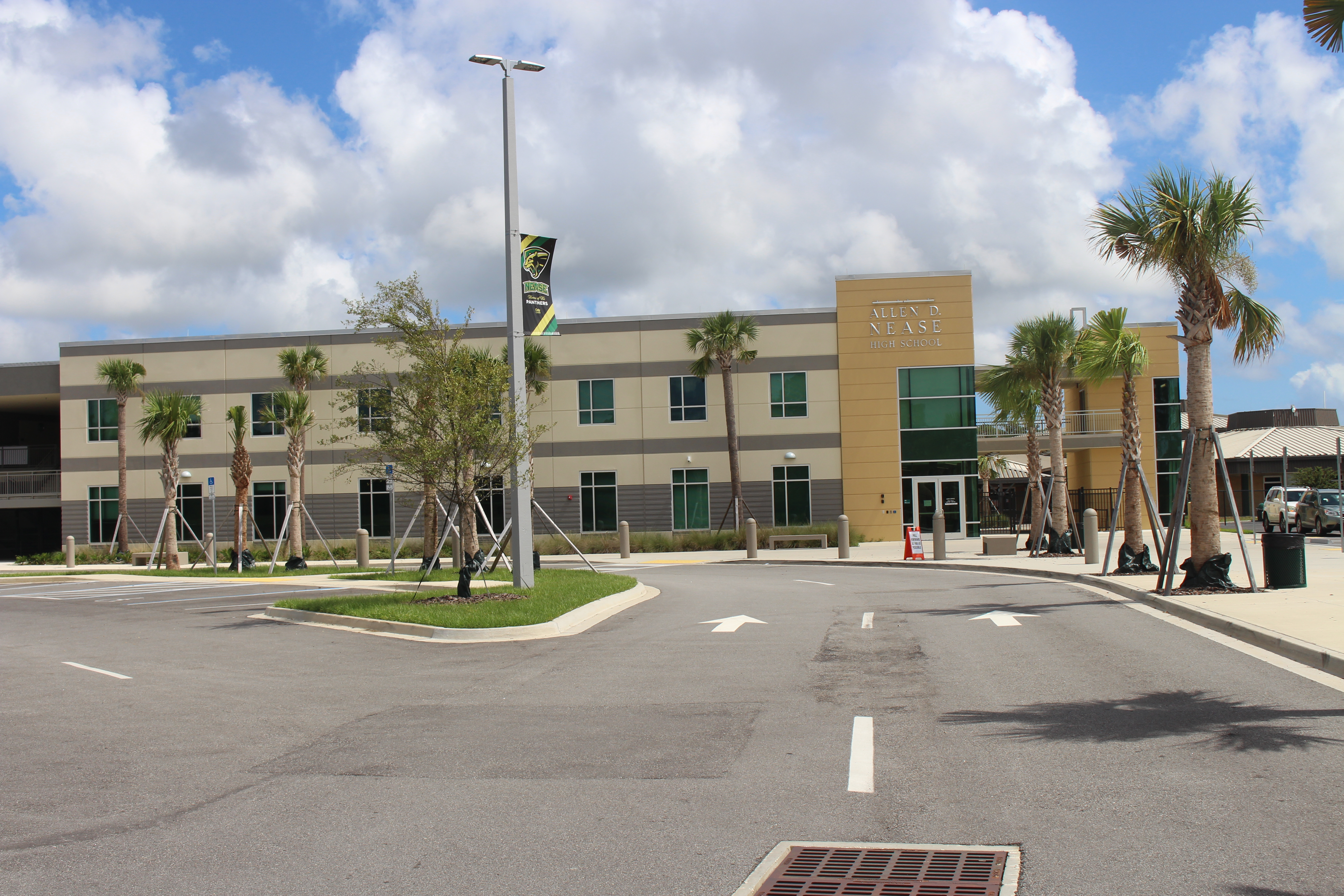

Location
- 10550 Ray Road; Nocatee (Ponte Vedra address), Florida 32081; United States; 30°4′49″N 81°26′58″W

Information
- Type: Public high school
- Established: 1981
- School district: St. Johns County School District
- Superintendent: Dr. Brennan Asplen
- Principal: Dr. Kyle Dresback
- Staff: 98.00 (FTE)
- Grades: 9–12
- Enrollment: 2,346 (2026–2027)
- Student to teacher ratio: 22.59
- Colors: Green; Gold
- Team name: Panthers
- Rival: Ponte Vedra High School
- Website: School website

Allen D. Nease High School is a high school in the St. Johns County School District, located in the Nocatee census-designated place (with a Ponte Vedra, Florida postal address), in St. Johns County, Florida. It is a part of the St. Johns County School District.

It was established in 1981. The school is a member of the International Baccalaureate program.

Communities in the school's attendance boundary include: the majority of Nocatee CDP.

== Namesake ==
Nease High School is named after Allen Nease, a pioneer in Florida's reforestation efforts, and donor of the land on which the school was built. Nease also served on the St. Johns County School Board for 24 years, 17 of which as chairman.

== History ==
Growth in the northeast corner of St. Johns County, primarily in the Ponte Vedra Beach/Palm Valley areas during the 1970s had warranted the construction of a new school. The school, which opened in 1984, is the second public high school built in St. Johns County. The school first opened as a Junior/Senior High School, but as the growth of Northwest St. Johns County rose the school eliminated its Junior high sector. Nease was originally designed to accommodate up to 1,500 students, however, enrollment has historically been at above capacity. Bartram Trail High School opened in the Fall of 2000 to alleviate overcrowding. Due to the continual growth in Northwest St. Johns County area, Ponte Vedra High School was built and opened in the Fall of 2008. Tocoi Creek High School opened in Fall 2021 to serve students residing in the World Golf Village area.

From the 2022-23 school year, Allen D. Nease Senior High School is zoned to serve the communities of Nocatee, Ponte Vedra, Palencia, Kensington and Las Calinas. The main feeder schools are Palm Valley Academy, Valley Ridge Academy and Pine Island Academy. Other students come from Pacetti Bay Middle School.

== Academics ==
Nease High School was rated the 81st best high school in 2007, 91st in 2008, 93rd in 2009, and 185th in 2010 by Newsweek. Nease High School ranked 977th in the U.S. News & World Report 2018 list of best public high schools in America.

Nease High School has the International Baccalaureate Program (IB), as well as Advanced Placement.

== Athletics ==
Nease competes in FHSAA Class 8A as the Panthers wearing the colors green and gold. The Panthers field teams in the following sports:

- Baseball (boys)
  - Boys state champion - 2017 (7A)
- Basketball (girls & boys)
  - State champion - 2002 (3A)
  - Girls state champion - 1999 (5A)
- Competitive cheer (girls)
- Cross country (girls & boys)
- Football (boys)
  - State champion - 2005 (4A)
- Golf (girls & boys)
  - Boys state champion - 1995 (4A), 1996 (6A), 1998 (6A), 2000 (2A), 2001 (A) and 2007 (2A). Six titles is the most of any school in Florida.
- Lacrosse (girls & boys)
- Soccer (girls & boys)
  - Girls state champion - 2002 (2A), 2005 (4A), 2006 (4A) and 2008 (4A)
  - Boys state champion - 2007 and 2008 (4A)
- Swimming (girls & boys)

Boys state champion - 2022 (3A), 2023 (3A)

- Tennis (girls & boys)
- 4A Track & field (girls & boys)

2021 FHSAA Runner up

- Volleyball (girls)
  - State champion - 2008 (4A)
- Weightlifting (girls & boys)
- Wrestling (boys)

== Notable player ==
- Tim Tebow, did not attend (home schooled) played sports only: 2007 Heisman Trophy winner, professional football and baseball player.

== Notable alumni ==
- Mario Butler, professional football player
- Victoria Crawford, former WWE Divas Champion known as Alicia Fox
- Jeff Klauk, professional golfer
- Evan Crenshaw, college football punter for the Troy Trojans
- Len Mattiace, professional golfer
- Ben Nowland, professional arena football player (Grand Rapids Rampage)
- Samuel Shaw, professional wrestler known as Dexter Lumis in WWE
- Brodie Smith, professional disc golf player, YouTuber and professional ultimate frisbee player
- Nathan Sturgis, professional soccer player (Houston Dynamo)
