= Ponte Vedra High School =

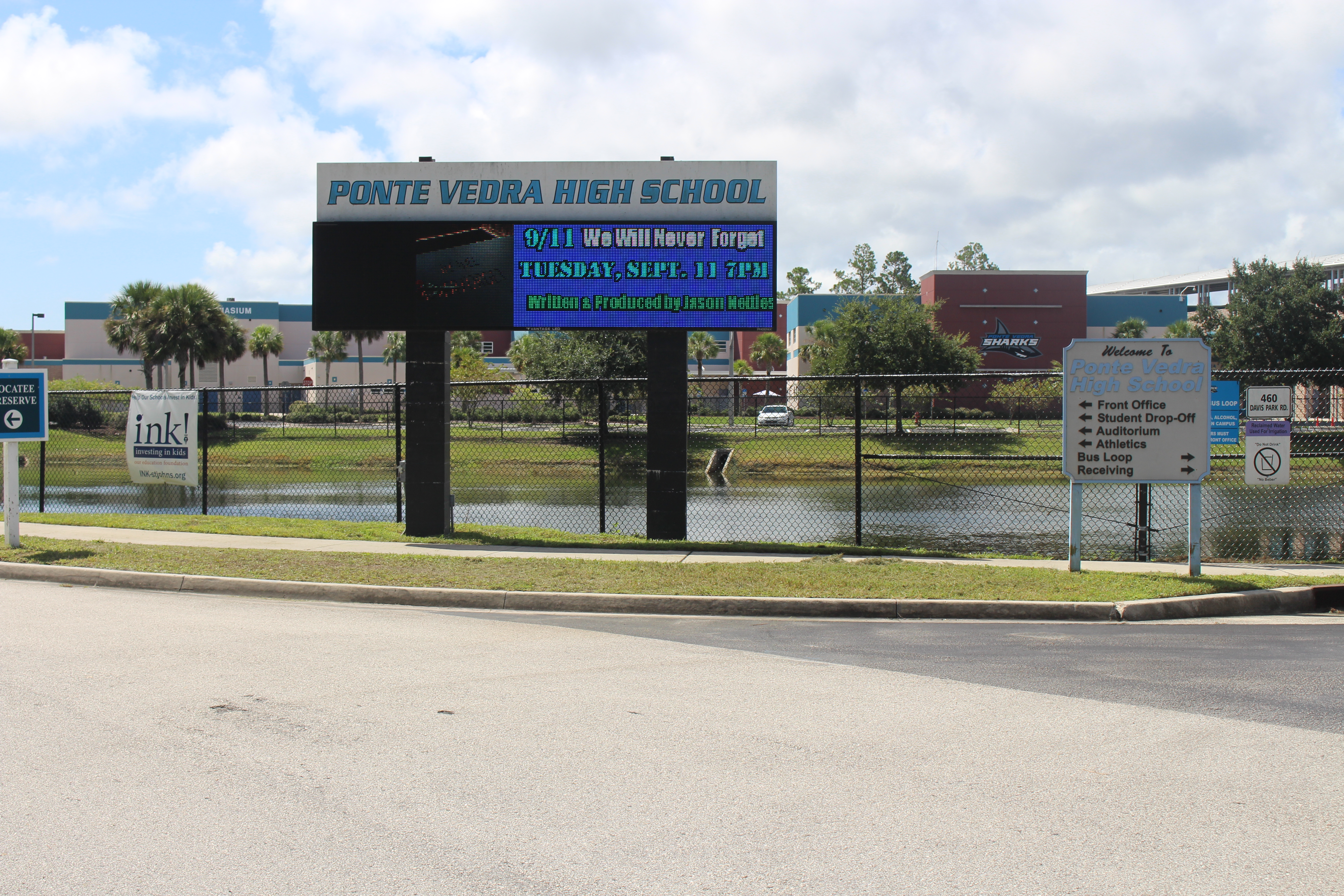

Location
- 460 Davis Park Road; Nocatee (Ponte Vedra address), Florida 32081; United States; 30°6′54.6″N 81°23′42.00″W

Information
- Type: Public school
- Established: 2008
- Status: Operational
- School district: St. Johns County School District
- Superintendent: Dr. Brennan Asplen
- School number: 511
- Dean: Bud Beech & Tom Stanton
- Principal: Fred Oberkehr
- Staff: 85.60 (FTE)
- Grades: 9 - 12
- Enrollment: 1,928 (2023-2024)
- Student to teacher ratio: 22.52
- Hours in school day: 9:15 a.m. - 3:50 p.m.
- Campus size: 77 acres (0.31 km^{2})
- Campus type: Suburban
- Colours: Blue, silver, and white
- Nickname: Sharks
- Rival: Nease High School Creekside High School
- Website: www-pvhs.stjohns.k12.fl.us

Ponte Vedra High School (PVHS) is a public high school in the St. Johns County School District, located in Nocatee census-designated place, northeast St. Johns County, Florida. The high school was constructed to relieve overcrowding at Allen D. Nease High School.

Communities in the school's attendance boundary include: Palm Valley, Sawgrass, and portions of Nocatee.

== Overview ==
The school is within the Nocatee Development of Regional Impact. Before Ponte Vedra High School was constructed, Ponte Vedra and Palm Valley students attended Nease High School. When the Saint Johns County School Board appropriated funding for Ponte Vedra High School land was not available east of the intracoastal waterway. The Nocatee Developers (The Davis Family and The PARC Group) agreed to donate 77 acres to the school district as the site for the new Ponte Vedra High School. Total budget was $63,590,000 which included building, grounds, furniture and equipment but did not include the value of the land donation estimated to be $6,100,000.

Ponte Vedra High School has a capacity of 1,500 students. The school is composed of three connected two-story building clusters with an open courtyard in the center. The gymnasium and auditorium are on opposite sides with athletic facilities in the rear. The school graduated their first senior class in June, 2010.

The school's first principal was Craig Speziale, who was hired the year before the school opened in 2008 and served until February, 2014 when his treatment for cancer forced him to leave. Speziale died on April 19. He was succeeded by Steve McCormick as Principal. This was followed by previous assistant principal Fred Oberkehr filling the position.

== Academics ==
The advanced scholars program gives students the option to participate in the rigorous programs of Advanced Placement, dual enrollment, and honors courses. As of the 2016–2017 school year, US News ranks Ponte Vedra High School as the 29th best high school in Florida. Nationally, Ponte Vedra is rated as 364th. In a ranking of STEM programs, Ponte Vedra was ranked 208th in the country. US News awarded the school a Gold Medal rating overall.

== Academies ==
Their curriculum offers academy programs in the areas of Information Technology, Biotechnology, International Business, Marketing, and Teaching. The curriculum consists of five academic paths for students: Information technology, biotechnology, international business, marketing, and teaching.

== Athletics ==
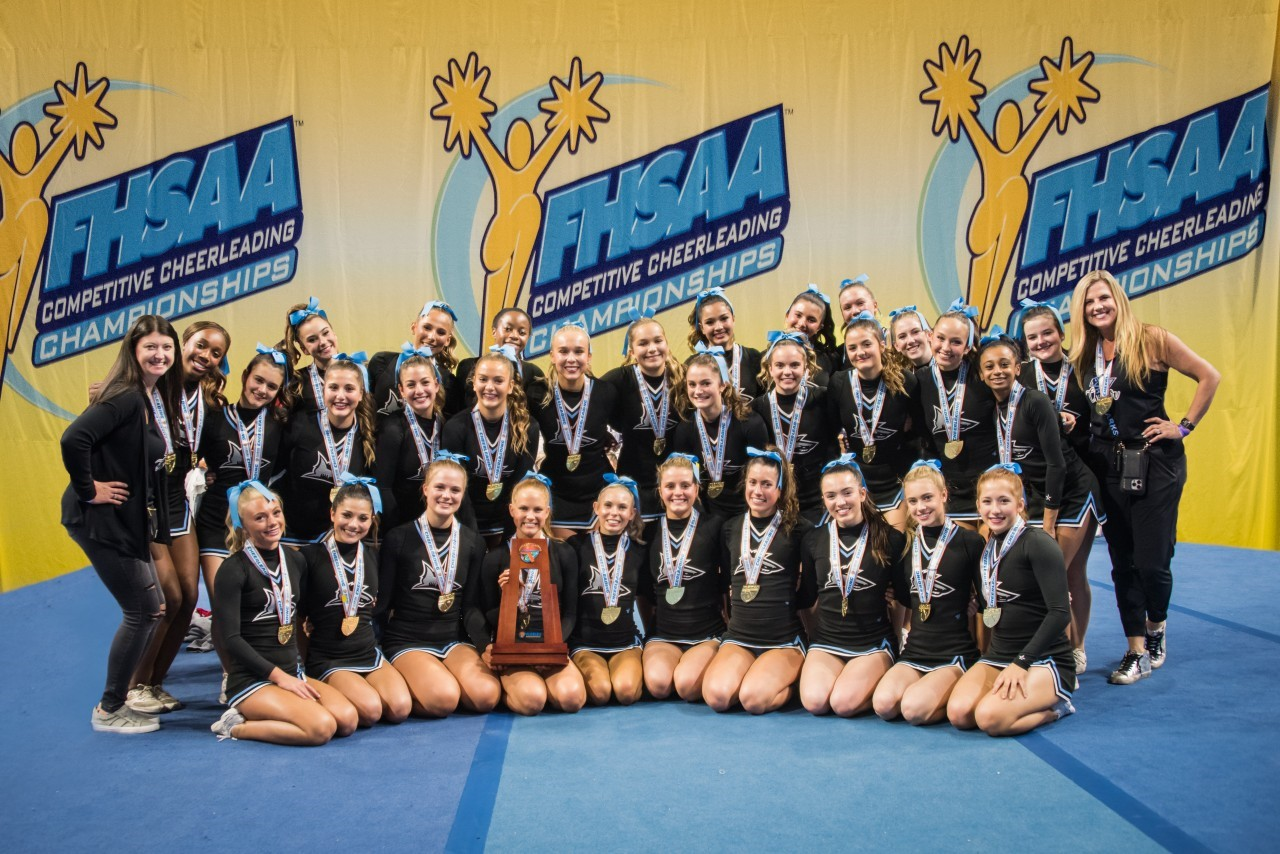
Ponte Vedra High School Varsity Cheer - 2023 Florida State Champions

Ponte Vedra has 12 boys varsity programs and 12 girls varsity programs. These include baseball, basketball, cheer, cross-country, diving, football, golf, lacrosse, soccer, swimming, tennis, track, wrestling, volleyball, and the marching band.

The Ponte Vedra High School Varsity cheerleaders have been recognized for their performance in competition. The team has earned multiple Florida High School Athletic Association (FHSAA) State Championship titles, coming in first place for Class 1A Extra Large Varsity cheer in first place in 2022, 2023, and 2025, and for Class 1A Small Non-Tumbling in 2018, 2020, 2021, 2022, and 2025. Prior to their consecutive state championship victories, the Ponte Vedra High School Varsity Cheerleaders secured the runner-up position in 2020 and second runner-up status in both 2019 and 2021.

In 2013–2014, the Shark varsity boys soccer team won the class 3A state title over American Heritage and were chosen at one of the top 20 teams in the country by MAXPREPS.

The Ponte Vedra boy's varsity lacrosse team won the Florida High School Athletic Association (FHSAA) 2019 state championship for the first time in school history. Ponte Vedra defeated St. Thomas Aquinas of Fort Lauderdale, FL, by the final score of 19–7 on Saturday, May 15, 2019.

Notably, as of the 2021–2022 school year, the Ponte Vedra High School boys football team, has enjoyed a 12-2 record against their chief rival, Allen D. Nease High School, out of 14 total games played between the two schools.

Girls Volleyball: State runner-up 2016. Class 6A State Champions 2017, 2019, 2020.

In 2022, the women's Swimming team achieved the Class 3A state championship title.

== Media center ==
The school was named one of 26 in the state of Florida to earn the Florida Power-Library School award in July, 2009. The Library Media Services division in the Florida Department of Education collaborated with the Association of Supervisors of Media to select those chosen.

== Student body ==
As of the 2015–2016 school year, the school employs 69 full-time teachers, and has a total enrollment of 1,490.

The student body is 90% white, 5% Hispanic, 2% Asian, 2% black, and 1% mixed race.

== Notable alumni ==
- Beau Beech (2012), basketball player who plays professionally in Taiwan
- Ricky Karcher (2015 - transferred), baseball player who played for the Cincinnati Reds
- Jacob Young (2018), baseball player for the Washington Nationals
