= Ponte Vedra, Florida =

Unincorporated community in Florida, United States

Coordinates: 29°58′18.99″N 81°25′40.43″W

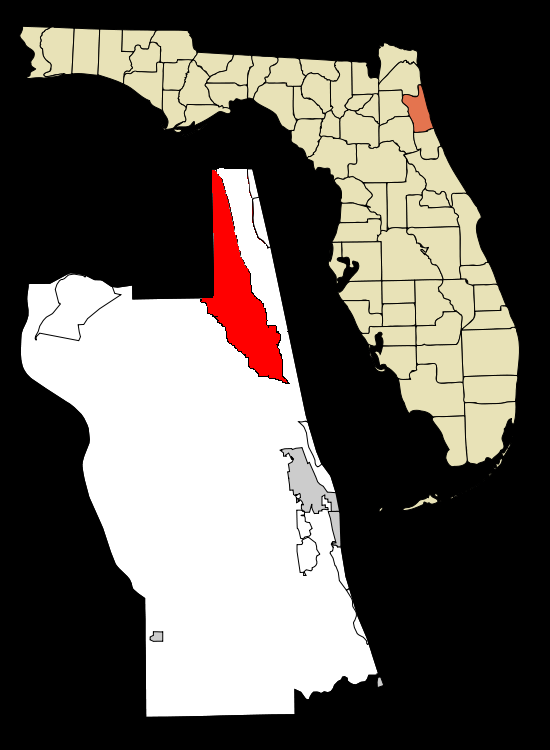
Location of Ponte Vedra, Florida

This page is for the inland community in Florida. For the beachfront community, see Ponte Vedra Beach, Florida
For other places, see Pontevedra (disambiguation).

Ponte Vedra is an unincorporated area in northern St. Johns County, Florida, United States, 18 miles (29 km) southeast of downtown Jacksonville, 26 miles (42 km) north of St. Augustine and west of the Intracoastal Waterway.

Historically, there was no distinction between Ponte Vedra and Ponte Vedra Beach. However, after the Nocatee development became reality and Ponte Vedra High School opened, the United States Postal Service designated the area south and southwest of the 32082 area as Ponte Vedra and assigned it zip code 32081 in anticipation of future growth. Ponte Vedra is located west of the Intracoastal Waterway; south and east of the Duval county line. It presently includes parts of Palm Valley, much of Nocatee, Allen D. Nease Senior High School and Ponte Vedra High School The population of Ponte Vedra was 33,249 according to Census data:ACS 2023 and it is primarily a residential area.
