= Sawgrass, Florida =

- CDP
- Location in St. Johns County and the state of Florida
- Coordinates: 30°11′34″N 81°22′22″W
- Country: United States
- State: Florida
- County: St. Johns
- development: 1972

Area
  - Total: 3.37 sq mi (8.73 km^{2})
  - Land: 3.02 sq mi (7.83 km^{2})
  - Water: 0.35 sq mi (0.90 km^{2})
- Elevation: 3 ft (0.91 m)

Population (2020)
  - Total: 5,385
  - Density: 1,780.2/sq mi (687.34/km^{2})
- Time zone: UTC-5 (Eastern (EST))
  - Summer (DST): UTC-4 (EDT)
- Postal code: 32082
- Area code: 904
- FIPS code: 12-64525
- GNIS feature ID: 2402826
- Website: www.sawgrasscommunity.com

Sawgrass is a census-designated place (CDP) in St. Johns County, Florida, United States on the southern half of San Pablo Island. The population was 5,385 at the 2020 census, up from 4,880 at the 2010 census. The area is located in Ponte Vedra Beach and part of the Jacksonville, Florida Metropolitan Statistical Area. Sawgrass is home to The Players Championship (TPC), established in 1974. The tournament offers the highest prize fund of any tournament in golf.

== History ==
Initial development was done by James Stockton Jr., son of a principal of Stockton, Whatley, Davin & Co. one of the biggest names in mortgage banking, real estate and insurance in the southeast U.S. While on safari in Africa in 1970, he envisioned another golf course resort development like Ponte Vedra in the wild landscape along the coast. After he returned to Florida, he purchased 1,600 feet of ocean frontage near property SWD had available since the 1960s. He engaged a golf course architect and an engineering firm to draw plans for a new development that eventually encompassed 1,200 acres.

At one point Stockton had doubts about using the name, Sawgrass. The plant is common to wet, marshy, mucky ground like the Everglades and the leaves have sharp, often serrated (sawtooth-like) margins. However, when most people hear the term sawgrass, they think of Pampas grass, its first cousin.

The developer recalled that there were 140 units sold in the first year, but in 1973, with the country in turmoil, sales dropped to nine and Stockton became concerned about being successful. All the money from sales was plowed back into the development and business was difficult for a few years. Two events helped turn the situation around. First, Jacksonville began construction of J. Turner Butler Boulevard, a limited-access expressway to the Atlantic Ocean, just north of Ponte Vedra Beach. The commute time from the beaches to downtown was cut in half. Second, Paul and Jerome Fletcher agreed to sell 415 acres (1.68 km^{2}) adjoining Sawgrass to the PGA Tour for one dollar. That land became TPC Sawgrass, the first of several Tournament Players Clubs.

== Geography ==
According to the United States Census Bureau, the CDP has a total area of 3.2 square miles (8.3 km^{2}), of which 3.1 square miles (8.0 km^{2}) is land and 0.1 square miles (0.26 km^{2}) (4.33%) is water

=== TPC Sawgrass Players Club ===
This upscale community in Ponte Vedra Beach consists of 1,200 acres. Located between the Atlantic Ocean and the Intracoastal Waterway, Sawgrass Players Club, a gated community, holds 16 neighborhoods, a retirement community called Vicar's Landing, the Oak Bridge Golf and Country Club, and the famous golf course, the TPC Sawgrass.

=== Sawgrass Country Club ===
Located in Ponte Vedra Beach, this residential area resides to the east of A1A. There are 38 smaller neighborhoods within the large gated community. Within Sawgrass Country Club, there is a private golf course with amenities and a beach club across the street. Membership is required.

== Demographics ==
Historical population
Census	Pop.	Note	%±
1990	2,999		—
2000	4,942		64.8%
2010	4,880		−1.3%
2020	5,385		10.3%
U.S. Decennial Census

Sawgrass comprises two subdivisions: Sawgrass Country Club and TPC Sawgrass Players Club. The total number of residences is 1,409 in Sawgrass Country Club and 1,564 in TPC Sawgrass Players Club for a total of 2,973. This calculation excludes Vicar's Landing retirement apartment community located in TPC Sawgrass Players Club.

=== Monetary demographics ===
The median income for a household in Sawgrass was $79,951 in 2015 which is $30,525 above the state average. Many residents make $200,000 or more a year (19%). In 2015, the average housing unit cost $338,755. Detached houses cost $386,262 and townhouses cost $168,720. Houses for sale range from $200,000 to $2,000,000. The common industries for males and females are finance and insurance in nearby Jacksonville.

=== 2020 census ===
As of the 2020 census, Sawgrass had a population of 5,385. The median age was 59.0 years. 13.1% of residents were under the age of 18 and 37.3% of residents were 65 years of age or older. For every 100 females there were 85.1 males, and for every 100 females age 18 and over there were 83.1 males age 18 and over.

100.0% of residents lived in urban areas, while 0.0% lived in rural areas.

There were 2,607 households in Sawgrass, of which 15.3% had children under the age of 18 living in them. Of all households, 55.2% were married-couple households, 12.2% were households with a male householder and no spouse or partner present, and 29.0% were households with a female householder and no spouse or partner present. About 32.1% of all households were made up of individuals and 19.3% had someone living alone who was 65 years of age or older.

There were 3,248 housing units, of which 19.7% were vacant. The homeowner vacancy rate was 2.2% and the rental vacancy rate was 19.3%.

Racial composition as of the 2020 census
Race	Number	Percent
White	4,960	92.1%
Black or African American	23	0.4%
American Indian and Alaska Native	6	0.1%
Asian	111	2.1%
Native Hawaiian and Other Pacific Islander	4	0.1%
Some other race	31	0.6%
Two or more races	250	4.6%
Hispanic or Latino (of any race)	224	4.2%

=== Demographic estimates ===
The median household income was $119,349. 6.4% of the population lived below the poverty threshold, including 3.5% of those under 18 and 5.3% of those over 65. 96.6% of the population 25 years and older had a high school degree or equivalent or higher and 63.5% of that same population had a bachelor's degree or higher. 6.1% of the population were veterans.

== Education ==
It is in the St. Johns County School District.

The community is zoned to PV-PV/Rawlings Elementary School, Alice B. Landrum Middle School, and Ponte Vedra High School.

Additionally Palmer School (K-8) is nearby.

Community colleges

- Florida State College of Jacksonville
- Saint Johns River State College

Universities and four year colleges

- Flagler College
- Jacksonville University
- University of North Florida
