= Nocatee, Florida =

Planned community in Florida

Nocatee
- Census-designated place
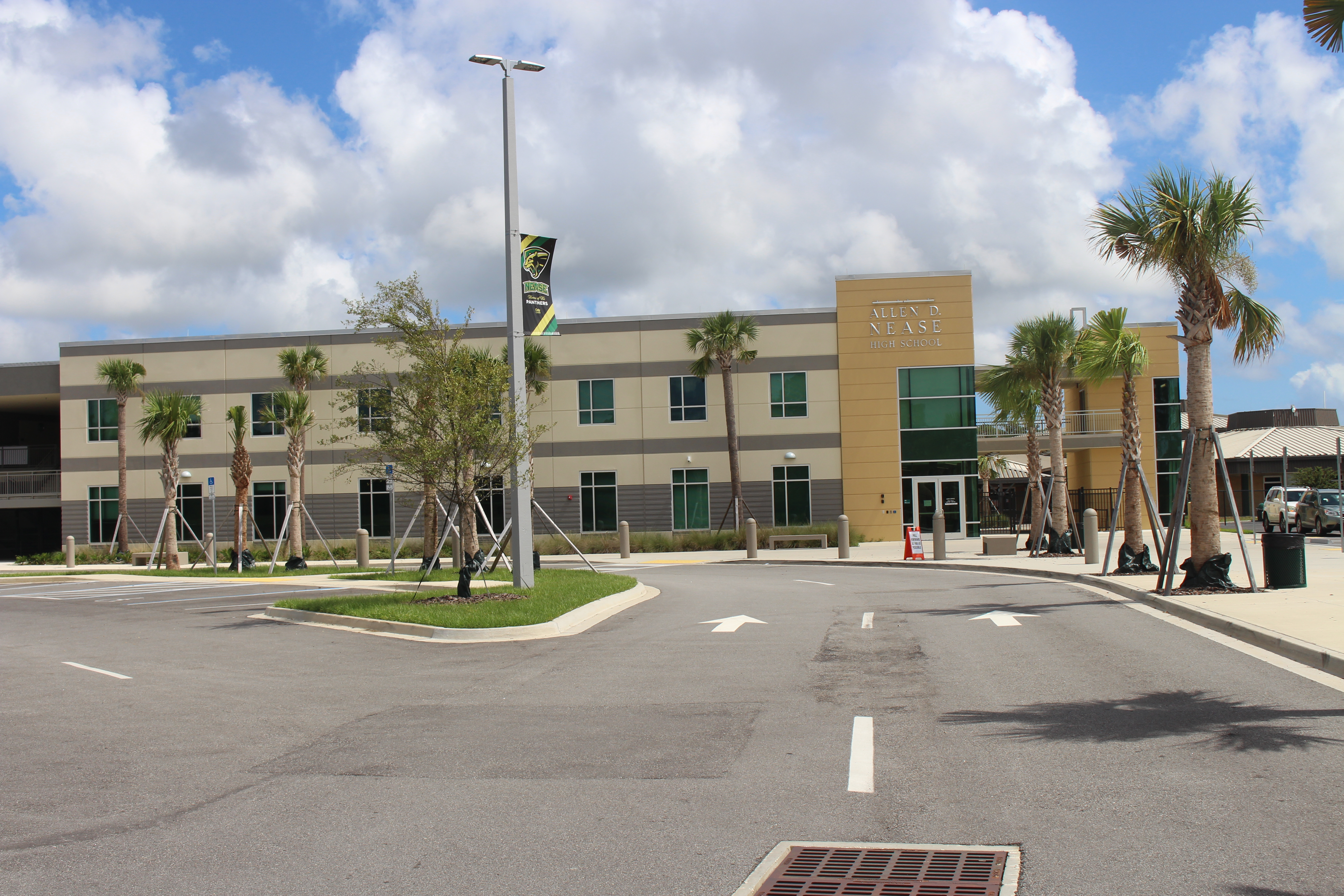
- Allen D. Nease High School in Nocatee CDP

- Seal
- Motto: Live The Lifestyle
- Interactive map of Nocatee
- Coordinates: 30°05′36″N 81°23′24″W
- Country: United States
- State: Florida
- County: St. Johns

Area
  - Total: 27.29 sq mi (70.68 km^{2})
  - Land: 26.40 sq mi (68.38 km^{2})
- Elevation: 26 ft (7.9 m)

Population (2020)
  - Total: 22,503
- Time zone: UTC-5 (Eastern (EST))
  - Summer (DST): UTC-4 (EDT)
- ZIP code: 32081
- Area code: 904
- GNIS ID: 2583369
- Website: www.nocatee.com

Nocatee /ˈnɒkətiː/ is an unincorporated planned community and census-designated place (CDP) located primarily in northern St. Johns County, Florida. The population was 22,503 at the 2020 census. It is part of the Jacksonville, Florida Metropolitan Statistical Area. As of 2025, the community consists of fifty neighborhoods, some of which are specialized for certain age groups. The community blends a variety of neighborhoods with schools, parks, recreation, offices, shopping, and restaurants. Part of the development lies within Jacksonville city limits in Duval County, although the CDP lies entirely within St. Johns County. It is near Ponte Vedra Beach in Florida's First Coast region and sits on 13,323 acres (5,392 ha) of land. It was approved in 2001 as a Development of Regional Impact (DRI) under Section 380.06 of the Florida Statutes.

In addition, Nocatee is near beaches, golf courses, business parks and major airports in downtown Jacksonville and St. Augustine.

== History ==
In 2005, Nocatee's creator, The PARC Group, broke ground on the construction of the township. The PARC Groups's Chairman and CEO, Roger O'Steen, founded the group in 1989 and was directly involved with the development of Nocatee.

== Amenities ==
Nocatee contains two large water parks, the Splash Park and Spray Park. Each has pools, slides, and kid-specific areas. The pool areas host events throughout the year, such as Food Truck Friday, farmers' markets, holiday celebration, concerts, Easter egg hunts, and more community events. The community contains other amenities like parks, neighborhood pools, fitness centers, dog parks, a kayak launch, a nature preserve and a series of nature trails.

== Demographics ==
Historical population
Census	Pop.	Note	%±
2010	4,524		—
2020	22,503		397.4%
U.S. Decennial Census

Nocatee first appeared as a census designated place in the 2010 U.S. census.

=== 2020 census ===
As of the 2020 census, Nocatee had a population of 22,503, up from 4,524 at the 2010 census, an increase of nearly 400%. The community had 7,821 households and 6,532 families. The median age was 40.9 years; 10.2% of residents were under the age of 5, 30.3% were under the age of 18, and 19.2% were 65 years of age or older. For every 100 females there were 93.3 males, and for every 100 females age 18 and over there were 88.0 males age 18 and over.

93.2% of residents lived in urban areas, while 6.8% lived in rural areas.

Of the 7,821 households, 44.0% had children under the age of 18 living in them. Of all households, 74.1% were married-couple households, 6.6% were households with a male householder and no spouse or partner present, and 16.7% were households with a female householder and no spouse or partner present. About 14.6% of all households were made up of individuals and 8.8% had someone living alone who was 65 years of age or older.

There were 8,293 housing units, of which 5.7% were vacant. The homeowner vacancy rate was 2.8% and the rental vacancy rate was 8.9%.

Racial composition as of the 2020 census
Race	Number	Percent
White	18,287	81.3%
Black or African American	589	2.6%
American Indian and Alaska Native	28	0.1%
Asian	1,148	5.1%
Native Hawaiian and Other Pacific Islander	24	0.1%
Some other race	349	1.6%
Two or more races	2,078	9.2%
Hispanic or Latino (of any race)	1,842	8.2%

=== American Community Survey estimates ===
The median household income was $131,738. 3.5% of the population lived below the poverty threshold, including 0.8% of those under 18 and 2.4% of those over 65. 97.4% of the population 25 years and older had a high school degree or equivalent or higher and 65.9% of that same population had a bachelor's degree or higher. 8.4% of the population were veterans.

== Events ==
Nocatee hosts a variety of events consisting of trivia, on-tap beer tastings, food truck Fridays, monthly farmer’s markets, as well as holiday-themed events such as Easter egg hunts & live music.

== Education ==
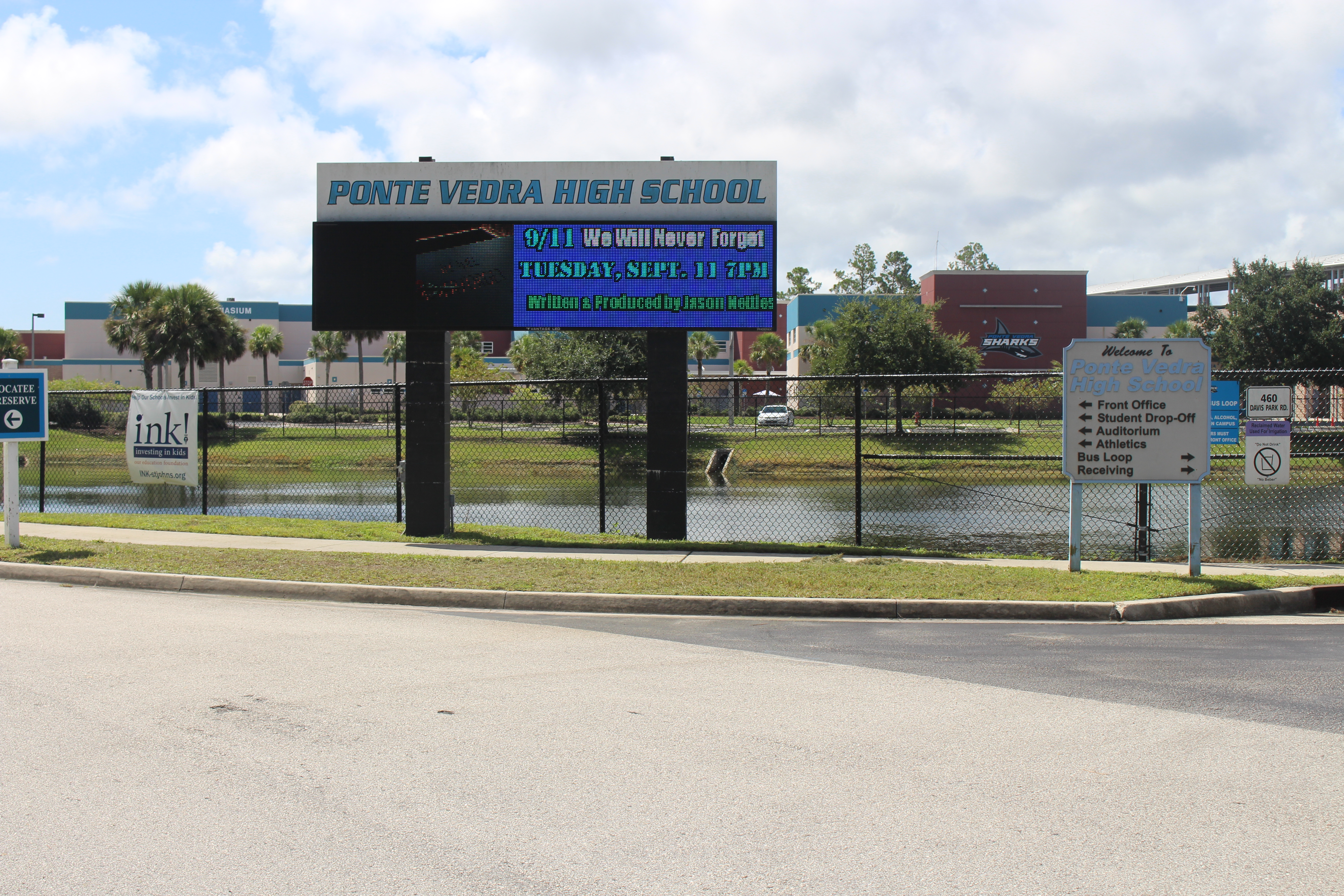
Ponte Vedra High School, in the Nocatee CDP

St. Johns County School District is the school district of the St. Johns County portion, which includes the entire census-designated place. Three elementary schools and three middle schools serve portions of the CDP. The elementary schools are Palm Valley Academy, Pine Island Academy, and Valley Ridge Academy. The middle schools are Palm Valley, Pine Island, and Valley Ridge. Allen D. Nease High School serves the Nocatee CDP.

The official subdivisions of the Nocatee development in St. Johns County are zoned to the Palm Valley, Pine Island, Valley Ridge K-8 schools, and Nease. The portion in Duval County (not in the CDP) is zoned to Bartram Springs Elementary School, Twin Lakes Middle School, and Atlantic Coast High School.
