= St. Johns County Public Library System =

St Johns County Public Library System
- Location: St. Johns County, Florida

Other information
- Website: www.sjcpls.org

St. Johns County Public Library System serves the surrounding areas of St. Johns County, Florida, including St. Augustine, Ponte Vedra Beach, Fruit Cove, and Hastings. The library system has six branches, two bookmobiles, and offers books-by-mail service. In addition to books, periodicals, and online databases, SJCPLS offers computer access, notary services, Inter-Library Loan service, access to a Seed Library, test proctoring, and many volunteer opportunities. The library system also offers a dynamic range of programming for adults, teens, and children.

== History ==
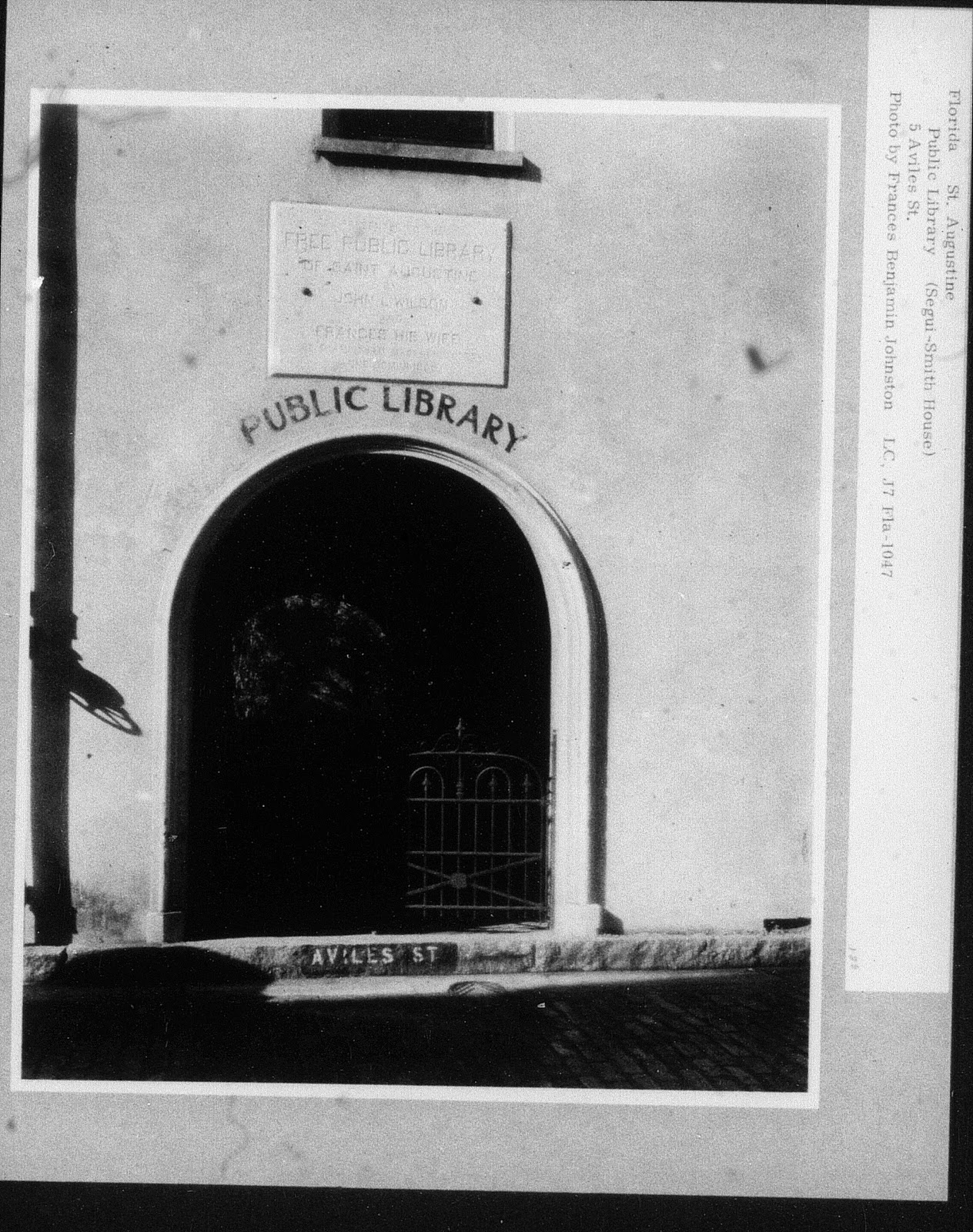

In 1874, the city of St. Augustine, Florida opened a "subscription library". The library was called the St. Augustine Free Public Library, located at 12 Aviles Street in downtown St. Augustine, Florida, now known as the Segui-Kirby Smith House. It currently serves as a research library for the Saint Augustine Historical Society. Patrons gave money to help buy books for the library, and there was no charge to check out items.

In 1895-96 the state of Florida library system reported the following statistics of note: Libraries reporting (13) [5 general, 2 schools, 5 colleges, 1 law], Number of Volumes for patrons available (43,506), Free libraries in the state (3). In 1895-96 only one free library in Florida having 3,000 volumes or more was reported (4,500) and was the Free Public Library in St. Augustine. The Name of the Librarian on record was John C. Wilson, president and the library reported that (1000) books had been issued during the year for home use.

=== SJCPLS Celebrates 40 Years of Library Service, 1977 – 2017 ===
In 1874, St. Augustine opened the oldest library in Florida as a “subscription library.” The library was called the St. Augustine Free Public Library. Patrons gave money to help buy books for the library, and there was no charge to check out items.

By the 1970s there were three independent libraries in St. Augustine, Hastings and Mill Creek serving the residents of St. Johns County. Through the hard work and dedication of many supporters, especially the members of the Association of American University Women, a Library System was born.

On September 27, 1977, the St. Johns County Board of County Commissioners voted to establish a Library System for the County, along with a Library Advisory Board. Within 10 years a new 15,000 square foot Main Library would be opened, followed in coming years by the construction of five more branch libraries and the addition of two bookmobiles. The growth of St. Johns County has been mirrored by the growth of its Library System!

== Branches ==
The library systems six branches are: Anastasia Island, Bartram Trail, Hastings, Main (Downtown, St. Augustine), Ponte Vedra, Southeast and the Bookmobile-Extension Services.

=== Anastasia Island Branch ===
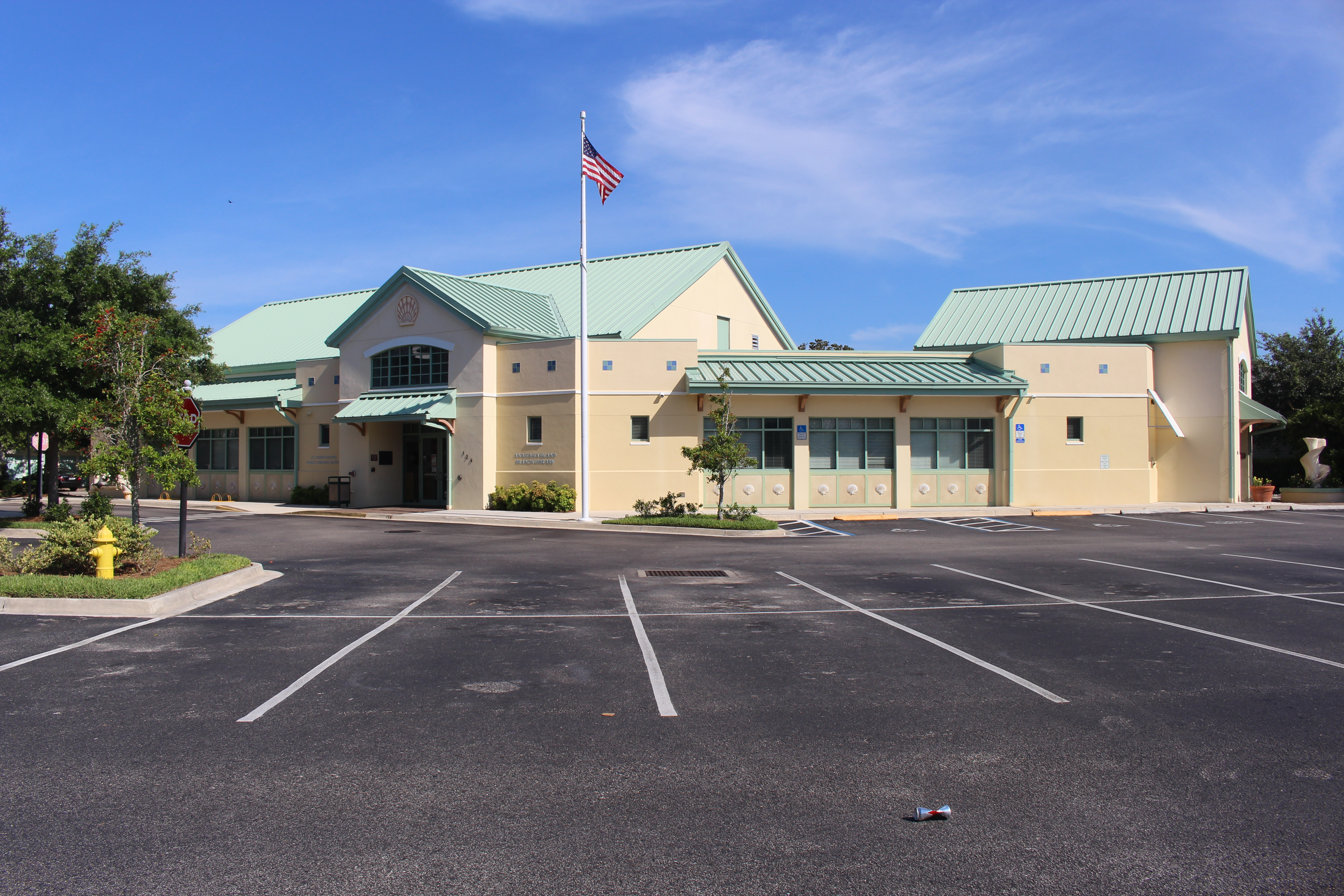
Anastasia Island Branch Library

The Anastasia Island Branch is located at 124 Seagrove Main Street, in St. Augustine Beach. It serves the east portion of St. Johns County. The Anastasia Island Branch Manager is Heather Sostrom.

The Anastasia Island Branch is the newest of the St. Johns County Libraries, first opening its doors on August 11, 2007. Since its opening the Library has experienced growth far beyond the original expectations for this small Library. At only 8,000 square feet, the Anastasia Island Branch Library consistently leads the Library System in community programming and attendance. This is due to its proximity to the beach, which attracts a large number of long term visitors from other states and countries. As a result, the Anastasia Island Branch Library has a uniquely diverse clientele not seen at other branch locations. Located in a business center, the library and has also become the local St. Augustine Beach Community Center. This was especially evident after Hurricane Matthew, as many came to the Library for emotional support, a free meeting place, and for recovery information.

=== Bartram Trail Branch ===
The Bartram Trail Branch library is located at 60 Davis Pond Blvd. in Fruit Cove, FL. The Branch Manager is Maribeth Beck.

The Bartram Trail Branch Library was opened by the county in 1985 and at that time was called the Northwest Library. It was originally located across from Wesley Manor, now Westminster Woods. The Bartram library was able to open thanks to a large number of donated books (many of which came from the Main Library in St. Augustine). The County paid the rent, electricity and the salary of one branch manager, Nancy Tanzler and was only open about 20 hours a week. As the library’s collection grew, so did its need for space and it re-located to the Food Lion Shopping Center. At that time, the county was able to pay two full time employees (Nancy Tanzler who continued to serve as branch manager and Betsy Gill as her assistant). In 1996 the branch moved from the shopping center to its present location and in 2007 the library was expanded to the present configuration.

=== Hastings Branch ===
The Hastings Branch Library is located at 6195 S. Main Street in Hastings. The Hastings Branch Manager is Brad Powell.

The Town of Hastings’ first free-lending library was started in 1906 by the St. Johns Methodist Episcopal Church until the building was torn down in 1930. Fortunately, a group of 17 women, known as the Hastings Home Demonstration and Women’s Club, created a new library in June 1928. The club insisted that the library collection include books which would appeal to children – a progressive attitude, as at the time, many libraries did not serve children whom they believed to be a distraction for adult readers. Continuing the tradition of encouraging young children to read, Branch Librarian Margaret Stevens began offering programming for all children in the community in 1969 regardless of race, ensuring the library’s role as a community center for all. The library continued to operate under the club’s direction until it was incorporated into the St. Johns County Public Library System in 1977 and it is located in the former Hastings High School, which is part of the National Registry for Historic Buildings.

=== Main Library ===
The Main Library is located in the downtown St. Augustine area, at 1960 N. Ponce De Leon Blvd. The Main Library Branch Manager is Nicole Jebbia.

The Northeast Corner of Florida was dubbed “The First Coast” in the 1980s to pay tribute to the place where Europeans first set foot on U.S. soil in St. Augustine (the new name was also a marketing ploy to attract more tourists). However, new name aside, St. Augustine continued its tradition of being a leader by opening a subscription library in 1874 – the first library in Florida – thanks to the efforts of Francis L. Wilson, who negotiated with the U.S. Government to operate the library in two rooms of the U.S. Customs house (now Government House). In 1895 the Wilson family purchased a home on Aviles Street, which was the birthplace of Confederate General Edmund Kirby-Smith, and relocated the library to this location. In 1984, a one million dollar funding was approved to build a main library in St. Augustine. The house served as the public library until the construction of the current library in 1987. The library struggled for several decades as the country faced war and poverty, but thanks to the efforts of its patrons, including author Marjorie Kinnan Rawlings, who served as president of the library association from 1942 through 1943, it continued to serve the community. The later efforts of the American Association of University Women and the Junior Service League led to the establishment of a county library system. Today the Main Library continues to serve the community at its present location on Ponce de Leon Boulevard next to the Davenport Park. Many library patrons fondly remember the park's antique carousel that was only recently removed, using it as a landmark; many locals refer to the Main Library as the "library next to the carousel."

=== Ponte Vedra Beach Branch ===
The Ponte Vedra Branch Library is located at 101 Library Blvd. in Ponte Vedra Beach. The Ponte Vedra Beach Branch Manager is Kim Odom.

In answer to the demand for increased library services across Saint Johns County, the Ponte Vedra Beach Branch Library opened in 1985 as a volunteer library in the County Annex Building. Thanks to the Friends of the Library and an exchange of donated property to the present site, the building on Library Boulevard was dedicated in May, 1993. An addition to the structure opened in 2002, once again due to the efforts of the Friends.

=== Southeast Branch Library ===
The Southeast Branch Library is located at 6670 US 1 South, in the southeastern area of St. Johns County. The Southeast Branch Manager is Todd Booth.

The Southeast Branch opened its doors to the public on October 1, 2003 in response to a growing need for library services in the southern part of St. Johns County. Administrative Headquarters and Technical Services, which were critically overcrowded at the Main Branch, relocated to the Southeast branch at that time, followed by the Library Extension Services (Bookmobile) several years later. In addition to a welcoming staff, patrons are greeted by two decorative items that enhance the interior of the Southeast library – a giant quilt designed and graciously donated by the St. Augustine Piecemakers, which hangs directly above the entrance to the library, and a group of six historical St. Augustine photographs, given to the library by local photographer Betsy Lee.

The Southeast Branch Library also hosts the St. Johns County Seed Library, a community partnership. The Seed Library is a collection of open-pollinated and heirloom seeds that visitors can borrow to plant and grow at home.

=== Bookmobile ===
St. Johns County established its first bookmobile in 2001, named the LEO Express. Due to its popularity and additional funding, in 2008 St. Johns County purchased another bookmobile. This bookmobile is called the Bluebird Express and is able to service a larger population of St. Johns County.

Harold George is Manager of Library Extension Services. Both bookmobiles are housed in the Southeast Branch Library. In August 2010, the library system added its Books by Mail service. The library sends library materials to library patrons for free. These materials can be returned to any branch or bookmobile.

=== Library Administration ===
The Library Administration Headquarters are located at 6670 US 1 South, in St. Augustine. The Library System Director is Debra Rhodes Gibson.
