= Frances Kirby Smith =

Confederate States of America spy

Frances Smith (née Kirby; April 6, 1785 – August 3, 1875) was a Confederate spy and the mother of General E. Kirby Smith. She is listed as a Great Floridian as part of the Great Floridians 2000 program.

== Biography ==
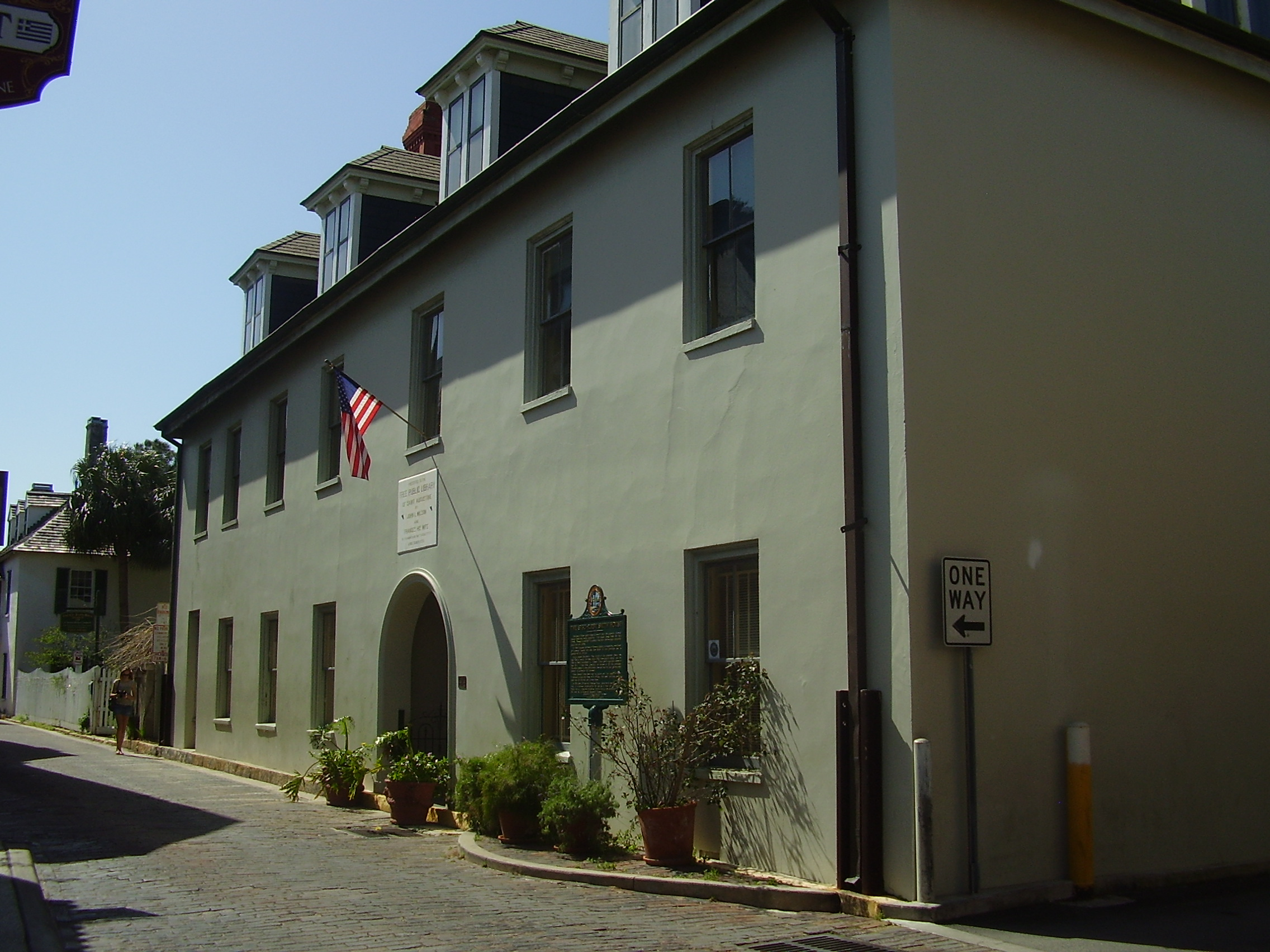
Smith's home in St. Augustine

Frances Kirby was born in Connecticut and married Judge Joseph Lee Smith. They moved to St. Augustine, Florida soon after their marriage in about 1820, and though Judge Smith died in 1847, she remained in the city after the Union took occupation of Fort Marion (Castillo de San Marcos) in 1862. During the War, She got mail out to Confederate soldiers and entertained Federal officers to learn of plans and pass on the information.

Smith was exiled following the spring 1863 Federal government order calling for removal of Southern sympathizers. She eventually returned to Saint Augustine and lived for another decade. She was a critic of Reconstruction and the "loss of true Southern gentility". Various local documents record her as "brilliant and spirited, full of fire and ambition throughout her long life".

Smith's residence during the American Civil War (present-day Segui-Kirby Smith House) houses the St. Augustine Historical Society Research Library. Two bronze statues and a plaque commemorate her life.
