= Alexander Darnes =

American physician

Alexander Hanson Darnes
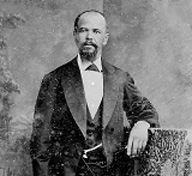
- Alexander H. Darnes, c. 1890
- Born: 1840; St. Augustine, Florida
- Died: February 11, 1894 (aged 53–54); Jacksonville, Florida
- Resting place: Old City Cemetery
- Education: Lincoln University, Howard University
- Occupation: Physician

Alexander Hanson Darnes (c. 1840 – February 11, 1894) was the first African-American physician in Jacksonville, Florida, and the second in the state. Born into slavery in St. Augustine, Florida, as a young man he served as a valet to Edmund Kirby Smith, the son of his owner, Judge Joseph Lee Smith. Darnes accompanied Smith to Texas while he served in the United States Army. During the Civil War, Smith commanded as a Confederate general.

After the war and emancipation of slaves, Darnes gained an education, aided by Frances Smith Webster, Kirby Smith's older sister. Darnes earned his undergraduate degree at Lincoln University in Pennsylvania and a medical degree from Howard University in 1880. He returned to Florida, settling in Jacksonville, where he set up a practice. In 1888 Darnes served residents during a terrible yellow fever epidemic, when half the population fled the city. Darnes was well respected, an officer of the Freemasons, and a member of the Mount Zion AME Church. Some 3,000 people, both black and white, attended his funeral, the largest in city history up to that time.

In 2004 a statue, Sons of the City, was erected at the Sequi-Kirby Smith House, showing both Darnes and Kirby Smith as adults in later life: Darnes the doctor and Smith the professor. It was the first piece of public art in Jacksonville to honor an African American.

== Early life and education ==
Alexander H. Darnes was born into slavery in St. Augustine, Florida. He was the son of Violet Pinkney, a domestic servant in the household, and an unnamed father. He and his mother were owned by Joseph Lee Smith, a judge, and Frances Kirby Smith, at what is now known as the Segui-Kirby Smith House at 12 Aviles Street.

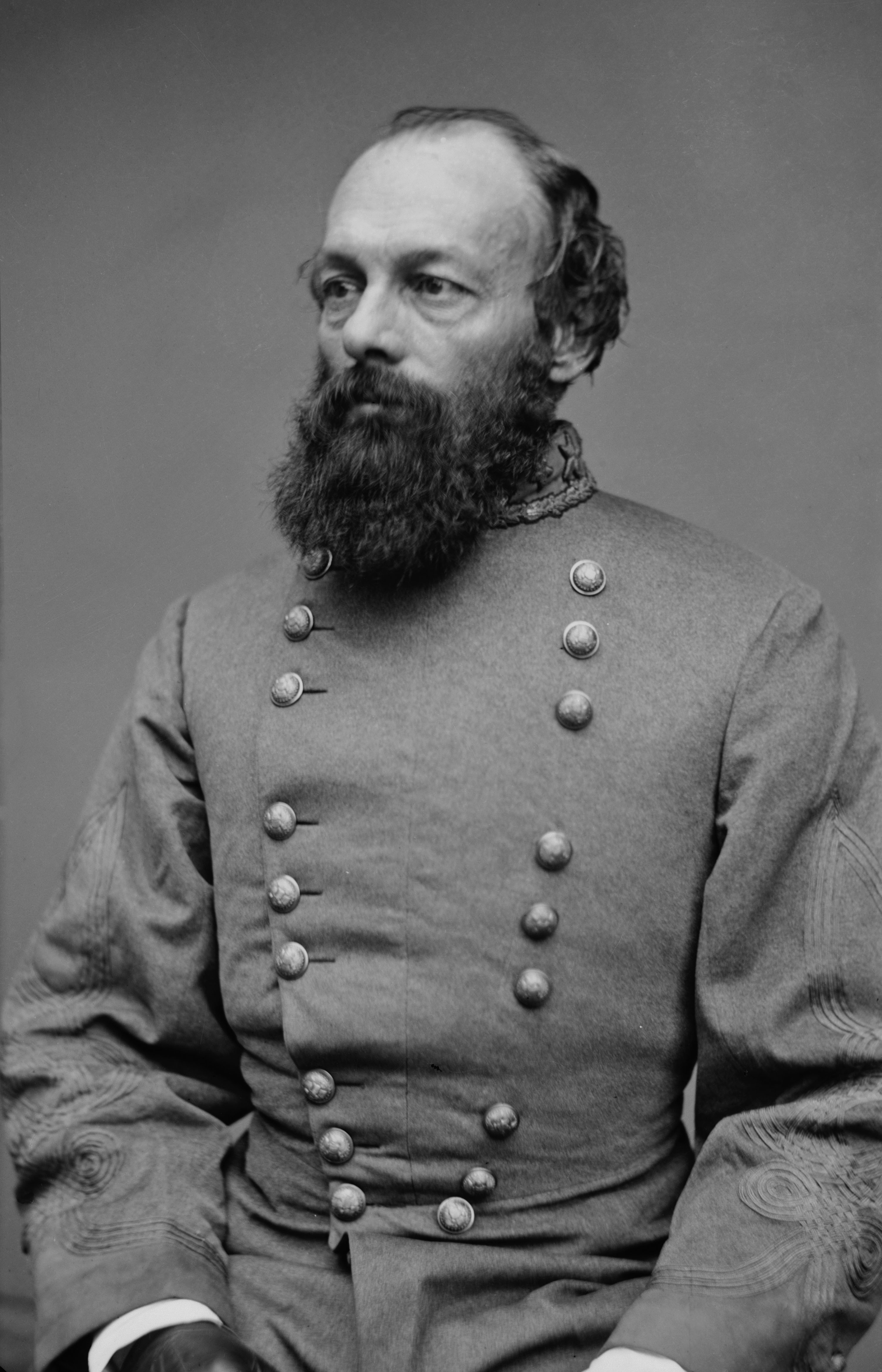
Edmund Kirby Smith

Photos held by the St. Augustine Historical Society show Darnes and his later owner Edmund Kirby Smith, the youngest son of the Smith household, who became a Confederate general. Maria Juliana Kirby-Smith, great-granddaughter of Smith and the sculptor who created a 2004 statue of the two men, said that she believes Darnes was related to Smith as a half-brother or nephew. Though this is unsubstantiated by evidence.

In 1855 at about the age of 15, Darnes was assigned to Edmund Kirby Smith as his personal valet; the youngest son in the family, Smith was 16 years older and by then a captain in the United States Army. Darnes was brought by Smith, listed as a ‘personal item’ on tours in the western territories and continued to serve him during the Civil War, when Smith was a general for the Confederacy.

After the South's defeat and the emancipation of slaves, Darnes gained an education. (He was financially helped by Frances Smith Webster, an older sister of General Kirby Smith. She was the widow of Lucien Bonaparte Webster, a US Army officer from Vermont who had died in 1853. Born in Connecticut, Smith Webster retained her loyalty to the Union during the Civil War.) After preparatory work, Darnes attended Lincoln University, a historically black college founded in 1854 in Pennsylvania. Darnes went to medical school at Howard University, a black college founded soon after the Civil War in Washington, D.C. He graduated in 1880 with a medical degree.

== Career ==
Darnes returned to Florida after medical school and settled in Jacksonville, where he set up a private medical practice. He was the first black physician in the city and the second in the state. Darnes built a thriving practice operated out of his home on Ocean Street and became a pillar of the community. He won praise for his work during the smallpox and yellow fever epidemics that swept Jacksonville in the late 19th century. These included the devastating yellow fever epidemic of 1887-1888 that swept the South, reaching Jacksonville in the summer of 1888. Not understanding how the disease was transmitted, almost everyone who could afford to fled the city - roughly half the city's population of 25,000. Darnes stayed to help those who remained as best he could. He was assisted by his friend and fellow Howard Medical School alumnus, Lemuel W. Livingston.

Darnes was accepted into the Freemasons, became a member of the local Masonic Temple, and rose to a position of prominence. He became the Florida Deputy Grand Master and High Priest of the Royal Arch Chapter of Washington, D.C. He also was a member of the Mt. Zion African Methodist Episcopal Church (AME), the first independent black denomination in the United States. It was established by free blacks in Philadelphia, Pennsylvania, in the early 19th century.

In Jacksonville, Darnes became a friend and mentor to the young James Weldon Johnson, who was 10 when they met, and his brother John Rosamond Johnson. The brothers later collaborated to write and compose "Lift Ev'ry Voice and Sing", known as "The Negro National Anthem." In his autobiography Along This Way, James Weldon Johnson fondly refers to Darnes.

Darnes died in February 1894. According to the obituary in local paper, 3,000 people, both black and white, attended his funeral, more than for any other funeral ever held in Jacksonville up to that time.

== Legacy and honors ==
- 1894, Darnes' large funeral was attended by more than 3,000 black and white citizens of Jacksonville. Obituaries of him were published by more than one local paper.
- 2004, Sons of the City, a life-size bronze sculpture of Smith and Darnes, was created by artist Maria Juliana Kirby-Smith, a great-granddaughter of General Edmund Kirby Smith. The sculpture portrays the two men as adults; Darnes' medical bag is shown beside him. The work was installed in the courtyard garden of the Segui-Kirby Smith House in St. Augustine. The house is now used by the St. Augustine Historical Society as its Research Library. This was the first public statue erected in the nation's oldest city to honor an African-American man.
- "In 2013, the Kirby Smith Camp 1209 of the Sons of Confederate Veterans discovered that Darnes' gravesite was in disrepair and erected a new marble gravestone."
