= Smith Hall =

Smith Hall may refer to:

- Smith Hall (Georgia Tech)
- Smith Hall (University of Alabama)
- Smith Hall at LaGrange College, listed on the National Register of Historic Places
- Hiram Smith Hall and Annex, listed on the National Register of Historic Places at the University of Wisconsin-Madison
- Smith Memorial Hall at the University of Illinois at Urbana-Champaign
- Kirby-Smith Hall at Louisiana State University
- Smith Hall (Carnegie Mellon University)
