= Joseph L. Smith (disambiguation) =

Joseph L. Smith was a member of the Democratic Party from West Virginia.

Joseph L. Smith may also refer to:

- Joseph Lee Smith (1776–1846), American lawyer
- Joseph Lindon Smith (1863–1950), American painter
