= Joseph Lee Smith =

American lawyer

Joseph Lee Smith (May 28, 1776 – May 24, 1846) was an American lawyer, military officer, judge, veteran of the War of 1812, and the father of Confederate States Army General E. Kirby Smith (1824–1893).

== Life ==
Joseph Lee Smith was born in New Britain, Connecticut, the son of Elnathan (1738-1826) and Chloe (née Lee) Smith (1746-1825). He was a descendant of Edward Seymour, 1st Duke of Somerset. His maternal grandfather, Colonel Isaac Lee, Jr. (1717-1802), was a veteran of the American Revolutionary War and was a member of the Connecticut General Assembly in 1776, 1778 to 1781, and 1783 to 1791.

Smith practiced law in Connecticut until the War of 1812 when he became a lieutenant-colonel in the United States Army and served with distinction in combat. At the Battle of Stoney Creek in Ontario, Canada, on June 7, 1813, his quick thinking and action saved the 25th Infantry Regiment from capture. After the war, he remained in the Army, rising to the rank of colonel, when he was placed in command of the 3rd Infantry Regiment in 1818. Discharged from the Army in 1821, he returned to his Connecticut law practice.

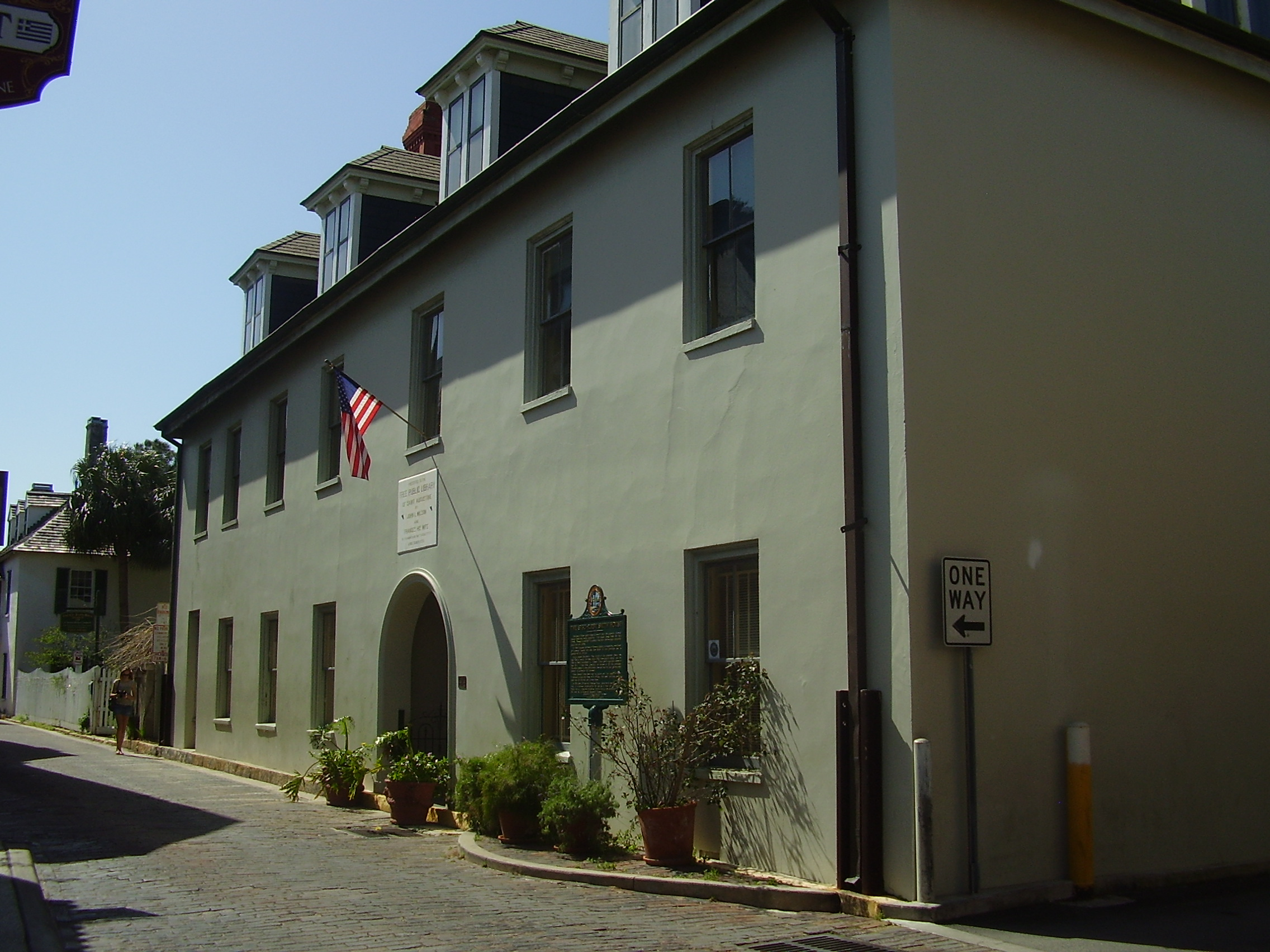
Smith's home in St. Augustine

Smith and his family moved to Florida Territory in 1821, when it became part of the United States. From 1823 to 1832, he was a territorial judge. On February 3, 1825, Richard K. Call, Delegate from Florida, introduced a resolution calling for the U.S. House Judiciary Committee to investigate Smith on the charge that he took bribes and kickbacks. The resolution was adopted. The investigation went on for years, with the last reference to it being in 1830, but it did not lead to articles of impeachment.

Subsequently, Smith practiced law in St. Augustine where he lived with his family at 12 Aviles Street. After his death, the house served as the St. Augustine Free Public Library. It currently houses the research library of the St. Augustine Historical Society. Alexander Darnes, son of slave Violet Pinkney, was born there. Darnes, who would remain enslaved until the end of the American Civil War, would become a celebrated and successful physician, the first Black physician in Florida. Smith and his wife Frances are buried in St. Augustine at the Huguenot Cemetery.

== Family ==
On August 25, 1806, in Litchfield, Connecticut, Smith married Frances Kirby, daughter of Connecticut politician Ephraim Kirby, and his wife, Ruth Marvin Kirby. She died in 1875. His son, Ephraim Kirby Smith, was born in Litchfield on June 17, 1807. A graduate of the United States Military Academy, he died in combat on September 11, 1847, during the Mexican–American War.

Ephraim's wife, Mary Isaacs (nee Jerome) Smith, was a second cousin, twice removed of Winston Churchill, and following her husband's death, she married General Amos Beebe Eaton on September 7, 1870. Ephraim and Mary had three children: Joseph Lee Kirby Smith, who was killed in action during the American Civil War in 1862 in Corinth, Mississippi; Emma Jerome Smith Blackwood; and George Geddes Smith, a veteran of the American Civil War, who committed suicide while serving in the United States Army and posted at Fort Russell, Wyoming.

Smith's son Kirby was born in Florida in 1824, graduated from the United States Military Academy in 1845, and served with his uncle in the Mexican–American War. He was one of seven full generals of the Confederate States Army during the American Civil War. They also had two daughters: Frances Marvin Smith (b. 1809), who married Lucien Bonaparte Webster, and Josephine Lee Smith (1818-1835). His grandson is Joseph Lee Kirby-Smith.
