= St. Augustine Free Public Library =

- 29°53′29″N 81°18′42″W
- Location: St Augustine, Florida

Other information
- Website: St. Augustine Historical Society

The St. Augustine Free Public Library is the oldest non operating library in Florida; opened in 1874 as a "subscription library." The library was first located in the U.S. Customs house, now known as the Government House at 48 King St, St. Augustine, FL. Its second location, at 12 Aviles Street in St. Augustine, Florida, is the building currently known as the Segui-Kirby Smith House and still stands as a Research Library for the Saint Augustine Historical Society.

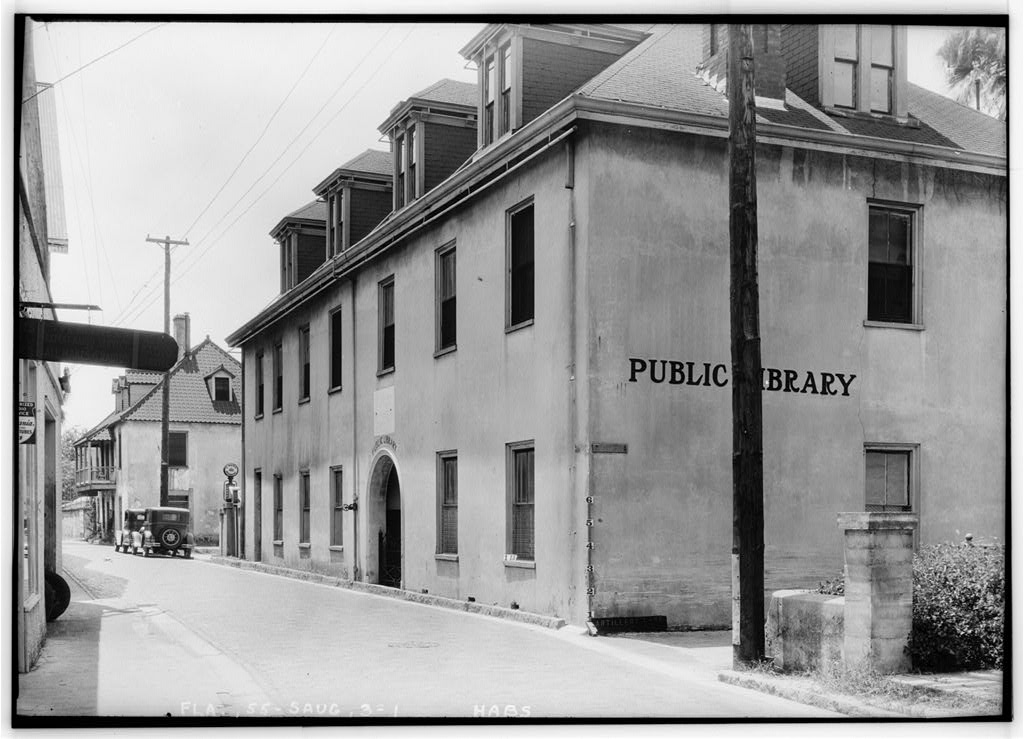

== History ==
Housed in one of the oldest standing colonial buildings in Florida, the St. Augustine Free Public Library was once the residence of British Captain, Henry Skinner in 1769 as well as Confederate General Edmund Kirby Smith in 1887.

St. Francis Inn property owner John L. Wilson and his wife Frances were instrumental in the formation of the public library system in St. Augustine. Frances Wilson started working on her project to open a library in 1870 "so that all might have the opportunity of reading and obtaining knowledge." Her husband John negotiated with the government to operate the free public library in two rooms of the U.S. Customs house (now known as the Government House). After they purchased the Segui-Kirby Smith House on Aviles Street, the library followed and was officially relocated in 1895. The couple helped form the St. Augustine Library Association and gave the building to a private organization to be used as a free public library, where it remained from 1874 until the 1980s. Since it was integrated into the public library system in 1977, the library was moved to the main branch of St Johns County Public Library System when its new 1.6 million dollar building was finished in 1987.

When the St. Augustine Library Association was first formed on April 25, 1874, no books of sectarian or political nature were to be purchased, but would be accepted if they were donated. Although there was no charge to borrow the books, library patrons gave money to help buy books for the library. The Free Library Association of St. Augustine and the St. Augustine Historical Society later formed the St. Augustine Historical Society Research Library. Today, the Research Library is still open to the public at no cost, however, much of the material are one of a kind and rare and, therefore, must be used within the library.

On September 27, 1977, the St. Augustine Free Public Library integrated into St. Johns County Public Library system and now serves as the Main Library to five other branches and two bookmobiles.
