= Huguenot Cemetery =

Historic cemetery in St. Johns County, Florida

- St. Augustine Public Burying Ground
- U.S. National Register of Historic Places
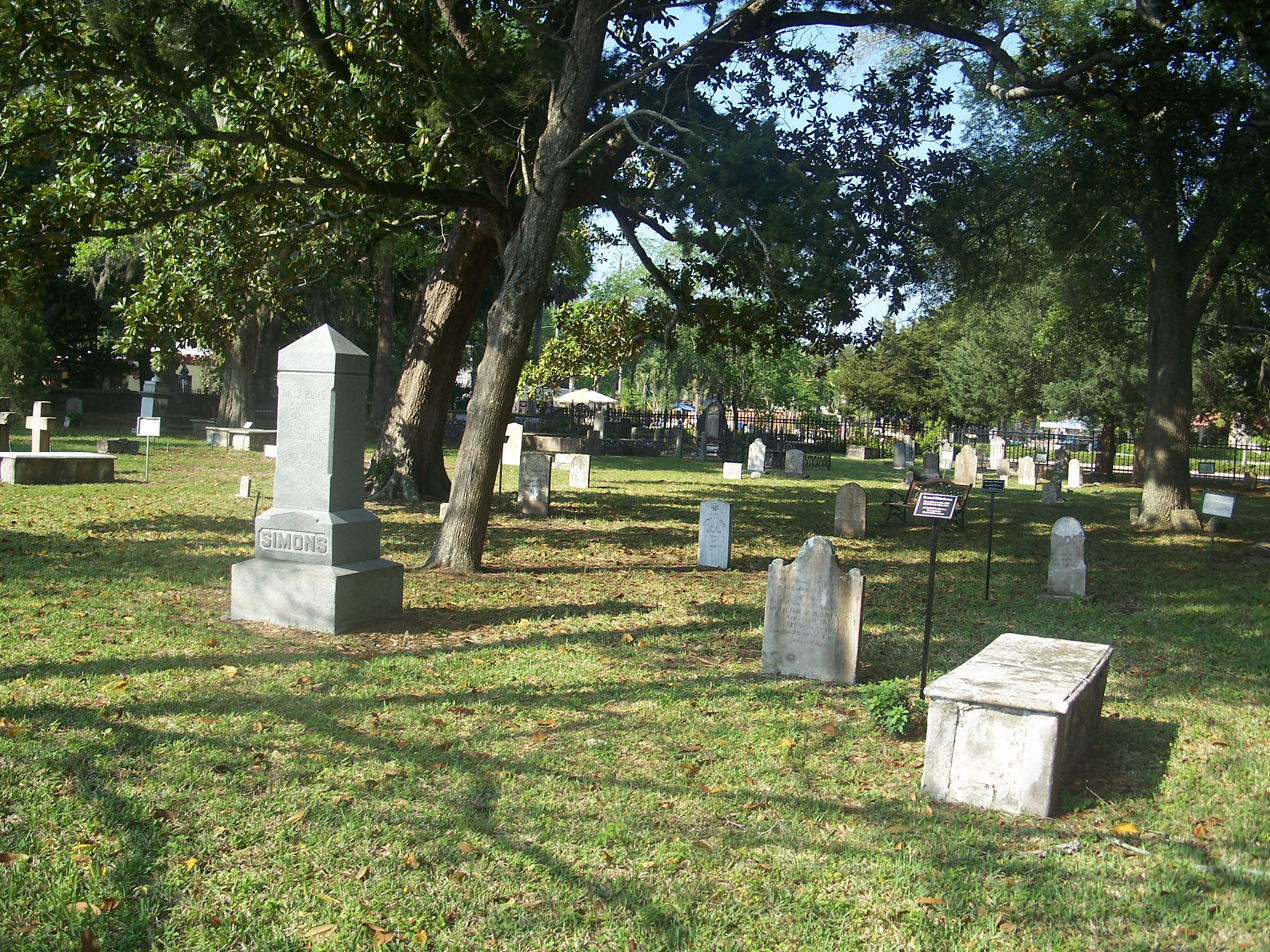

- Location within Florida Location within the United States
- Location: St. Augustine, Florida
- Coordinates: 29.8983°N 81.3139°W
- NRHP reference No.: 100006756
- Added to NRHP: July 23, 2021

The Huguenot Cemetery (also known as the St. Augustine Public Burying Ground) in St. Augustine, Florida, located across from the historic City Gate was a Protestant burial ground between the years 1821 and 1884. The Spanish colonial city of St. Augustine, along with the entire Florida Territory became de facto American possessions after the 1819 signing of the Adams-Onis Treaty. The actual physical occupation of the city and Florida territory occurred in 1821.

Prior to American occupation the Spanish city of St. Augustine was predominately Catholic and the only burial ground within the city, the Tolomato cemetery, was reserved for Catholics. Recognizing a need for a formal Protestant burial ground an area just outside the city gate was chosen by the new American administration in St. Augustine. The first burials occurred in 1821 just prior to a yellow fever epidemic which claimed the lives of a large numbers of the city's inhabitants.

The cemetery until title to the cemetery property was acquired by the Rev. Thomas Alexander, who then turned over it to the Presbyterian Church in 1832, burials continued until 1884 when both Huguenot and Tolomato cemeteries were closed. The cemetery is believed to hold at least 436 burials according to city records. The cemetery although named "Huguenot Cemetery" isn't believed to contain any members of the Huguenots, a French Protestant sect started in the 16th century in France.

== Tomb locations-inscriptions ==
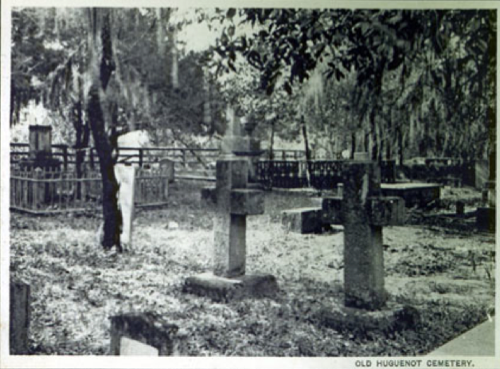
Huguenot Cemetery

INSCRIPTIONS IN THE OLD PROTESTANT GRAVEYARD AT ST. AUGUSTINE, FLORIDA. Vol. XLVIIPalatka, Fla. Oct. 20, 1881. Aged 5 years 18 days. This grave is about 7 feet from the south fence of the yard.

- Godfrey Foster, born Mch. 4, 1818, died Sep. 3, 1879. This and the preceding stone near each other and nearly alike.
- Flora Fairbanks, daur of C. & G. Foster, died Feb. 10, 1879, aged 25 years. Marble upright head and footstone.
- My husband P. O. Craddock born Sep. 22, 1824 - died Jan. 8, 1884. White marble head and footstone and wooden curbing. The four above graves are in the south-east corner of the yard - lot apparently one - 36 to 40 feet north and south, 9 to 10 feet east and west, paling fence partly down.
- Row 2. Mrs. Mary T. Smith a native of Liberty Co., Georgia, died at St. Augustine April 27, 1860. Aged 77 years. Stone erected by her daughter. Marble upright head and footstone.
- Row 3. An enclosed child's grave with four substantial posts and 3 rails on each side - no monument.
- Mary Almyr Mickler, died Augt 7, 1882. This grave has a wooden headboard, and stands north-east of the two Meckler graves in the adjoining row, 4.
- Row 4. Doctor Wm Robertson - by his only child. Mrs. Ann Robertson - by her only child. Lot close against the south fence of the yard - 9 feet by 9 feet, raised a foot above the general surface and entirely covered with coquina and cement. A cast-iron railing enclosed the two raised tombs each with a broad white slab placed horizontally atop. Next the above lot northwardly a wooden curbed grave - no monument.
- Captain Robert Mickler - who was born at St. Mary's, Georgia, 7 May 1800, and died at St Augustine, Fla., 9th Dec. 1848. Aged 48 years, 7 mos., 2 days. A horizontal marble slab on cemented foundation - a cedar at north-east corner.
- James A. Mickler, died Jan. 29, 1878. Aged 53 years. A native of St. Mary's, Georgia. Upright wooden head and footboard adjoins preceding northward.
- Mrs. O. Howes of New Haven, Conn., died May 29, 1883. A headboard in a lot with slatted curbing 2 feet high.
- Row 5. A large lot with cemented curb and paling fence above enclosing 3 graves - two adults and a child between; each grave with a cemented curbing and 3 cemented horizontal stones (apparently) at head. No inscriptions.
- Nancy Pinkham, died Jan. 31, 1876, aged 73 years. Erected by her niece S. J. Mitchell. Sallie Pinkham, died Sept. 11, 1875, aged 69 years. Erected by her niece S. J. Mitchell. Each of the Pinkham graves has erect marble head and foot stones on brick foundation. A large osage orange to the north of the S. Pinkham grave.
- George H. Emery, died July 30, 1880, aged -0 years. Only one figure of the age decipherable - doubtless an adult. Wrought iron fence in good condition, set in a cement foundation, under gate an iron plate with the name Emery. Lot 10 by 15 with paling fence around, contains several graves - one marked by a large cross another by a small headstone with the letters A. T. on it. Two large cedars, one at the north-east corner of the lot, the other at the foot of the cross-marked grave. A 3d small cedar at the lot's north-west corner.
- To my husband John Manucy, born Dec. 24, 1820, died Oct. 20, 1879 - aged 59 yrs. 9 mos. 27 days. White marble head and footstone and white marble curbing. (Third Florida Inf. Co. B CSA) An adult's grave with coquina head and footstone, both low. 6 feet north of the Manucy grave and east of the Whilden grave.
- Dr. J. Hume Simons. Lot with paling fence around - the size of one grave, and nailed to paling at head of grave a heart-shaped shield with zinc plat nailed to it containing above name.(from Charleston, South Carolina )
- "A fond father and mother have caused this stone to be erected to the memory of their dutiful and affectionate son Edward S. Robinson, who departed this life 21st Oct. 1821 aged 20 y. 1 m. 8 d." A large cedar west of the broad marble upright headstone.
- Samuel Fleischman, son of Dirk and Elizabeth Fleischman born 6th Feb. 1807, died 18 Oct. 1821. Horizontal marble slab broken in two at centre, rests on brick foundation with marble corners. North of the above a coquina block with a depression for vertical headstone which is absent.
- Row 6. Robert Johnson Gibbs, obit Sep. 12, 1830. AEt. 23 years. Upright marble head and footstone within a brick walled enclosure - 7 by 9 feet. Grave in north portion of lot, and the lot is close against south fence of yard.
- "Mrs. Ann Campbell, who departd this life May 3, 1836, aged 60. A marble horizontal slab on a brick foundation."
- "Daniel W. Kissam, who departd this life on the 22d of March, 183-, in the 24th year of his age. He was a native of the City of New York." Inscription on a marble slab 3 feet 6 inches high and 2 feet wide, which rests against a large cedar. The trunk of this cedar has flattened out and at both __ upper corners overlaps the headstone. A large cedar also just outside footstone - both trees apparently planted at one time.
- Freeman Foster, died Nov. 12, 1877. An upright marble head and footstone. Grave adjoins that of Daniel W. Kissam.
- Ella M Foster, died Augt 26, 1877. White marble upright head and footstone. Adjoins preceding.
- "Maria Carman, who departd this life April 8, 1833, aged 40 years." Marble head and footstone - 2 feet high and wide.
- John B. Stickney, born in Lynn, Mass., May 25, 1832. Graduated at Yale College 1856. Died in Washington, D. C., Nov. 5, 1882. A blue and red marble monument of a number of pieces - nine to ten feet high. (Captain, 35th Massachusetts Volunteer Infantry U.S. Attorney for the Northern District of Florida, 1876-82 re-interred Washington, D.C.)
- Mrs. A. W. Bradford, born in Charleston, S. C., Mch. 31, 1816, died in St. Augustine, Feb. 9, 1881. Wooden head and footboard, with wood curbing around the grave. An acacia by the headboard.
- "William R. Whilden, son of Elias and L.E. Whilden, Christ Church Parish, So. Car., who departd this life 23rd day of Oct. A. D. 1821. Aged 4 years 10 mos. 17 days." A horizontal marble slab on a coquina foundation.
- Row 7. Alfred Arnold, born in Ironstone, Mass. [?], May 1820, died in St. Augustine, Fla., April 1880. A white marble tablet set inside of a coquina obelisk, which with its supporting stones is 5 feet high.
- I. G. Happoldt, who departed this life 15 August 1821. Aged 53 years 3 months and 10 days. He was a native of Germany and long a respected citizen of Charleston. A white marble uprights slab - the roots of a large cedar pressed against the base of it.
- Ten feet south of the McKinney footstone in row 8, an enclosed grave with paling fence around in good condition. No stone.
- Row 8. Hectorina Kennedy Honfleur, daughter of John Grant, of Inverness, Scotland, died at St. Augustine, April 12, 1854, aged 43 yrs. Upright marble headstone - inscription on scroll.(born January 20, 1807, in Glasgow, Lanarkshire, Scotland)
- J. E. Knowlton, died Augt 5, 1877, St. Augustine, aged 69 years. White marble headstone. This last tribute placed here by the bereaved children of Josias Campbell, who departed this life 3rd day of Sep. 1830, in the 52 yr. of his age. A native of Ireland.
- Also, Elizabeth Campbell, consort of Josias Campbell, who died 5 day of July 1830 aged 39 y. 6 m. 23 days. A native of Camden, So. Carolina. Also, in memory of their son Josias, who died on the 4th day of July 1830, aged 3 yrs. 3 mos. 7 days. A large horizontal marble slab containing the above - slab tilted and the south-west corner in the ground.
- Helen A. Hasseltine, died June 3, 1881, aged 46 years. A coquina obelisk on two base stones, inscription on marble tablet set in one of the faces east of the obelisk.
- A coquina horizontal block without inscription east of the north line of the Stanbury lot. Covering perhaps a child's grave.
- Alexander McKinney, born 1818, died Feb. 28, 1882. Erected by his beloved children. Upright white marble head and footstone. Close to footstone a red cedar, and 3 feet north of centre of grave another.
- Mrs. Mary C. Furguson, of Charleston, S. C., who died 3d day of Novemr 1830, aged 34 years. Stone erected by her bereaved husband. Horizontal marble slab - directly adjoining the Josias Campbell tomb.
- Joseph Lord, born in New York, Mch. 1832, died in St. Augustine, Jan 12, 1880. White marble vertical tomb of 3 pieces, also footstone. These last two graves are between the Campbell and the Hasseltine graves.
- Row 9. Captain Edmund Hart, of New York, who died on 24 December 1830, aged 26 years and 4 months. A marble slab on a raised foundation.
- Dear Adell (perhaps Triay), died Oct. 29, 1877, aged 10 years. A marble head and footstone.
- Captain Giles Tenker, from Adams, Mass., who died Jan. 1, 1833, aged __ years. Head and footstone. A large hawthorn with ob-ovate leaves having a rusty ___ surface close to headstone. '
- Mary Page Hinckley, died Dec. 2, 1877. Otis Hinckley, died Nov. 17, 1877. Each marked by a large coquina cross and coquina footstones - a square marble tablet set in face of the latter.
- Gustavus Beall, a native of Washington City, D.C., born Sep. 20, 1823, died Feb. 9, 1848. A horizontal marble slab which has been moved to one side, and the coquina foundation has fallen out. A locust at west end of tomb.
- J. Downing Stanbury, died Nov. 23, 1877. Vertical marble head and footstones with coquina bases.
- Downing Haydn Stanbury, died Jan. 10, 1878. Small marble cross and footstone - a child's grave.
- Manuel Crespo, died June 30, 1859; aet. 63 yrs. Head and footstone.
- Annie A. Lewis, born 1837, died Sep. 29, 1881, 44 yrs. old. A tall post - the board containing inscription, completing a cross.
- Rev. Wilbur F. Nields, who died Mch 2, 1867, aged 26 years. He was elected to the rectorship of Trinity Church, St. Augustine, Fla. He came but God called him before he assumed the duties of his office. A marble headstone. A rose shrub at foot and a cedar against the edge of headstone, planted, to judge from its size at time of interment.
- Elizabeth M. Lewis, born Feb. 9, 1880, died Aug. 27, 1881, aged 1 yr. 6 mos. 18 d. A three feet high cross - inscription on cross-piece. Row 10. A raised tomb of coquina - one of the blocks forming its roof broken from place. Against this tomb there is an old and large sized oleander. No inscription.
- George Bartlett, a native of the State of New Hampshire - and a member of the fraternity of Ancient York Masons - who died in the city of St. Augustine, of which he had been for ten years a respected inhabitant, on 29 June, Anno Domini, 1844, aged 40 years. This tribute placed for his sleep'g remains by his bereaved and affectionate mother, Martha P. Bartlett. A broad horizontal marble slab on a coquina base - 24 inches high.
- Lillie S. Johnson, died Aug. 8, 1879, aged 4 years. Wooden head and footboard enclosed within a paling fence. An oblong cement block, covering perhaps a child's grave - without inscription - to the eastward of the Carpenter grave. East of the centre of the Dummett-Madison lot of Row 11 there ___ a water oak, 14 or 15 inches in diameter, and 8 feet eastward of ___ centre of a depression, 4 feet across and 8 or 10 inches below the surface. East of the north line of the D.-M. lot a youngish cedar, with a group of lilies at its base, and 7 feet still further east a large magnolia grows there with a trunk 18 inches near the base, and in a circle around that narcissi or jonquils. Here we have, without doubt, one or two graves without other mark. The magnolia is 10 or 12 feet slightly east of north of the oblong cement block.
- East of the mound, north of the Wm Thomas, Jr'., grave, there is a wooden headboard, but the inscription is absent.
- Israel A. Smith, who died Sep. 1, 1830 aged 20 years and 6 mos. A heavy white marble monument on a raised brick foundation.
- Maria Frances, daut of Jackson Browne French of Burlington, New Jersey, who died Feb. 4, 1832 aged 29 years. Head and footstone.
- Mrs. Lydia Boyce, a native of Newberry District, So. Car., who departed this life on the 27th day of September, 1830, aged 40 years. A white marble monument.
- John Scobie, a native of Perthshire, Scotland, who departed this life August 31, A.D. 1841, aged 64 years. Margaret Westry, wife of Nathaniel C. Scobie, born March 25, 1810, died Dec. 6, 1850. These two horizontal slabs on raised coquina foundation.
- Carpenter, ____ 1883. This inscription on marble tablet which is let into the upper face of a moulded slab of coquina. The slab is slightly titled and lies east of the Margaret W. Scobie slab.

Thomas H. Dummett

- Thomas H. Dummett, who departed this life the 31st of Aug. 1839, aged 64 years. (Colonel British Army, from Barbados: former owner St. Francis Inn, plantation owner, son Douglas Dummett)
- John Houston M. J. Madison, born May 5, 1820, died Dec. 20, 1853 and his son John Ripley Madison, born March 26, 1851, died May 6, 1852. The slightly depressed lot containing the above two horizontal stones is curbed, and midway of the east curbed line there is a block inscribed with the names Dumett-Madison. Two children's graves directly adjoin preceding, the western one with glazed brick edging to it, the other with white marble edging and headstone containing the name Willie.

North of this line of graves and southeast of the Douglas Pacetti grave are the two following: Single grave with cement curb and head and footboard but no inscription - an evergreen anonymous with curbing. A grave with palings around in very shaky condition - no mark. Directly adjoining above north -

- Rebecca Nattiel, died April 11, 1879, aged 72 years.
- Another similar headboard contains simply the letters J.N. Perhaps husband of R.N. A nicely curbed lot, the ground within depressed. No stones. The north side of lot two feet from the north fence. Southeast of the just-mentioned curbed lot, the corners touching, there is a large lot filled with lilies, not yet in flower, surrounded with a paling fence. Also a single grave north of this with fence surrounding it - a large water oak against its north side. No monuments in either enclosure.
- Wm Thomas, Jr., of New York City, who departed this life Dec. 27, 1840, aged 23 years. Marble head and footstone.

North of and directly adjoining the above a mound, and adjoining this mound northwardly another and shorter - Neither marked. As the Thomas grave and these two are so close together, the interred may be related. These succeed, through some distance - 10 feet north - from the two children's graves mentioned above on this page.

- Row 12. A mound with two graves covering the east end of it - the more southerly has a cedar tree against its footstone. - No Inscriptions. The adjoining lot with coquina curbing has an obelisk at its centre - this of granite on several foundation stones - the lowest of coquina 6 ft square. Its inscription as follows;
- Mrs. Julia G. Smith - who died in New York December, 1861. Erected by her husband Buckingham Smith, who died in New York Jan. 1871. A cedar in this lot has pushed one of the stones of the curbing aside. A headstone - broken - remnant 18 inches square, simply rests against the inner face of curbing of Julia G. Smith lot.
- Contains following inscription: William C. Kent, of Utica, New York, who died Hannah Smith, wife of late Josiah Smith, who died in November, 1857, aged 80 years. Marble head and footstone.
- Anita Amelia Smith, wife of Dr. John E. Porter, surgeon U.S. army, and daughter of Josiah and Hannah Smith of St. Augustine, born Feb. 18, 1815 - died July 25, 1850. A 6x10 marble table on raised coquina foundation, with marble slab containing inscription resting on the former.
- Sarah S. Williams, wife of John Williams, and daughter of Lemuel and Sarah Williams, of New Bedford, Mass. She died 25th Feb. 1839, aged 27 years. Vertical head and footstone. Cast iron fence around lot in good condition.
- Charlotte Smith, Daut of David Smith and Laura Ufford, born at Pitcher, Chenango Co., New York, 8 May 1833. - Died at Saint Augustine 6th Dec. 1877. Upright heavy granite headstone with two granite foundation stones below.
- Oscar Ashton, born Jan. 21, 1839, died May 8, 1960. Vertical head and footstone - a water oak 14 inches in diameter west of headstone.
- Douglas D. Pacetti, born March 11, 1862, died June 12, 1879. Wooden headboard with paling fence around grave - an Acacia Farnesiana within fence. The wooden headboard has been replaced by marble head and footstone. A child's grave with paling fence around, a cherry laurel within 6 ft of stone.
- Matlida DeLancy, died Dec. 23, 1875, aged 77 years. Erected by her affectionate daughter. A low vertical head and footstone of marble on cement foundation.
- Row 13. A raised tomb of coquina and cement - a child's perhaps - half the top is missing. No inscription.
- Charles Burt, died Jan 4, 1877, ae. 22 y. 7 m. 3 d. Alice Burt, died July 25, 1854, ae 2 years, 3 mos.
- Lucy Rockwell, wife of Geore Burt, and daut of Dr Seth S. and Sarah Peck, born at Whitesborough, N. Y., July 8, 1827, and died in this city March 27, 1857. The above has marble slab on raised marble foundation - an orange tree against latter. A curb surrounds lot with wrought railing. Adjoining lot to above has curb and iron rail, with at least one sunken grave, but not stone.
- W. E. Luddington, of New Haven, Connecticut., died May 1, 1884. Wooden headboard and light fence around.
- John H., son of Arthur Milliken, of Troy, N. Y., who died Apr. 23, 1839, aged 24 years. Upright head and footstone.
- Mrs. Rachel Gerty died May 2, 1863. Vertical headstone.
- J. W. S. McNeil, of the 2nd Regiment of Dragoons. He was killed in the 21st year of his age in battle with the Indians of Florida on the morning of 10 September 1837, by Uchee Billy, a chief of the Seminoles. He was the son of Gen. John McNeil, of new Hampshire - late of the U.S. Army, and grandson of the late Gov. Pierce of the same state. (Reinterred St. Augustine National Cemetery Gov. Benjamin Pierce:; father-in-law of Gen. McNeil) A marble slab lying horizontally on a raised coquina foundation - a good sized water oak between this and the grave to the eastward of Oscar Ashton.
- Nancy Townsend, of Sherburn, Mass., wife of Rev. S. B. Townsend, and daughter of Josiah Hunt of Seekonk. She died Feb. 4, 1832, aged 36 Vertical head and footstone.
- Marie Antoinette, daughter of Robert and Rosa Mason, born Dec. 17, 1879, died Dec., 4, 1880. Marble head and footstone. A grave marked by coquina head and footstone - no Inscription.
- A grave adjoining the above with board. 10 feet from north fence.
- Row 14. Mrs. Sarah Peck, died Aug. 16, 1879. Mother. Aged 88 yrs. 10 mos. Vertical marble head and footstones resting on granite bases.
- Dr. Seth S. Peck, born Aug. 9, 1790, departed this life July 21, 1841, aged 50 yrs. 11 mos. A marble horizontal slab on raised cement base.
- A horizontal marble slab, resting upon raised coquina foundation, has its face so worn away that but a few letters are faintly seen - apparently these: _______ _____ __________ ______ derick ________ 70 or 60 ___________1830 These graves are surrounded by a cement curb in good condition. Two raised brick tombs in lot adjoining that of Dr Seth and Sarah Peck - the tops of these have fallen in - the covering stones perhaps removed.
- A third grave, perhaps, to south of these with cedar to head and foot. The curbing around these of coquina 30 to 36 inches high.
- James H. Bradford, M.D., born in Philadelphia, Nov. 4, 1802, died at St. Augustine, Apr. 9, 1859.
- Elizabeth Caldwell, wife of Edward Florens Rivinus, M.D., born at Philadelphia, Jan. 15, 1814, died at St. Augustine, Apr. 22, 1856. This stone set midway of the lot, a cedar standing at the head of the grave, probably planted when interment was made. Lot including 2 above graves 7 feet by 9. The marble stones in this lot in good condition. Iron fence around.
- Edward M. Walker, a resident of Troy, N. Y., died Feb. 19, 1851, aged 34 years. Vertical head and footstones.
- Benjamin Franklin Tracy, a native of the State of Connecticut, and a merchant of Painesville, Ohio, who died at this place on 6 January 1834, aged 37 years, 2 mos. 21 days. A vertical headstone.
- James Burr Griswold, son of Zachariah Griswold, of New York, who died of consumption May 3, 1829, aged 22 years. A vertical headstone.
- Catherine Burrell, born at Old Gretna, Scotland, January, 1803, died at St. Augustine, Fla., May 28, 1878, aged 75 yrs. 5 mos. Wooden head and footboards. The grave next to Cath. Burrell's contains a small wooded cross, and is surrounded by a wooden curbing. Two large oleanders within the curbing and at diagonally opposite corners.
- Daniel A. White, born Mch 22, 1817, at Brockport, New York, died Augt 16, 1880, at San Mateo, Fla. This grave has marble head and footstones and marble curbing.
- Row 15. Absalom H. Valentine, of Brooklyn, Long Island, who died on a tour for his health at St Augustine, May 2, 1835, aged 42 years and 16 days. His tender care will long be remembered by his bereaved widow and mourning friends. Part of inscription. An upright marble slab - and headstone and footstone.
- Mrs. Mary Moody, wife of Dr. Moody, of Burlington, Vermont, who died at St Augustine 9 March 1829, aged 22 years. - Portion of inscription. A horizontal slab on a brick foundation raised 24 to 30 inches.
- Charles H. Allen, died A.D. 1870, aged (10 or 15) years. A wooden headboard in lot enclosed by paling covered with Smilax laurifolls or Stamnoides.
- Jane Frances Winfred Murray, consort of George Murray, Esq of St Augustine, E. F., and daughter of George and Sarah P. Anderson, born Sept. 6, 1801, at the Grand Caicos, one of the Bahama Islands, Died Apr. 7, 1826. An inscription of 12 lines following the above. A horizontal marble slab on raised marble foundation, with pillard corners. South side and two corner pillars of this tomb recently thrown down and slab moved.
- Gad Humphreys, obt. Augt 31, 1859, aged 73 years. Requiescat in pace. A tribute of Filial affection. A flat slab on marble faced raised foundation. Mother - on marble headstone. M.S.H. (monogram) on footstone. Large lot. The two above graves within 18 inche high curbing of cement.
- Zenas Clapp, of Salina, Onondaga Co., New York, who died 29 January 1837, aged 41 years. Five lines of inscription below. A vertical marble head and footstone. Quite a number of graves, unmarked, in this row.
- Row 16. "Mr. Jesse Baldwin, who departd this life on the 14th of March, 1835, aged 34 years." - 5 lines of inscription below. A vertical marble slab. This grave is close to the following.
- "Mrs. Ann S. Putnam, who departd this life the 31st of August, 1831, aged 68 years." Mrs. Putnam's grave is with posts at 4 corners connected by slats.

A vertical marble slab. This stone of same height as the above, but outline at top different. They however seem to belong together. Louisa Charlotte Izard, daut of Ralph and Elizabeth Izard, of South Carolina, who died on the 22d of January, 1825, etatis 31. Vertical marble slab on raised brick foundation.

- Underneath this stone are deposited the remains of Col. Charles W. Bulow, of Charleston, So. Car., who died on 1 May 1823, aged 44 years. Horizontal marble slab on raised marble-faced foundation. The flat slab out of place, and one corner marble post loosened.
- Ellen Isabella, daut of John Wheeler, D.D., of Vermont, wife of Rev. Joseph H. Myers, died Augt 11th 1854, aged 30 years. Three lines of inscription below. A vertical marble headstone on stone base. Lot enclosed with broad cement curbing surmounted by wrought railing and cast iron posts.
- James Holt, of New York, who died Feb. 19, 1835, aged 37 years, 1 month. A vertical headstone 26 to 30 in. broad, and footstone. These between the fences of preceding and following.
- "Helen Porter, daughter of Moses H. Baldwin, departd this life March 16, 1859, in the 16th year of her age." A vertical headstone. A fine white marble box, seven feet high, with considerable carving on it. Lot enclosed with a fence of nine granite posts with lines of wrought iron bars uniting them.
- Joseph Hunter, Esqr., a native of Ballymore, County Antrim, Ireland. For a long time a respectable planter of Mosquito, Died May 14, 1836, aet. 30 years. This memorial is erected by his only child, M.A.H.

A marble horizontal slab on raised marble faced foundation. Lot enclosed with iron fence. Mrs. _________, 1841. A bit of stone with this inscription. In a lot with cement (over coquina) curbing level with the ground without it.

- Harry Wilbur, son of James and Carrie Goss, who died Sep. 3, 1874, aged 10 years. A marble head and footstone James Goss, died Nov. 20, (or 26), 1877, aged 37. A wooden head and footboard. Each of these two lots enclosed in a paling fence now in weak condition L. B. A narrow headboard a foot high. The footboard between the graves of Harry W. and James Goss.
- Rachel T. Goodrich, Feb. 19, 1842; Apr. 27, 1869. A low broad granite stone. The grave directly adjoining, northwardly, that of
- James Goss. M. R. Castle, son of Martin Castle, of Connecticut, died November 28, 1878. aged 4 mos. 16 days. A marble vertical headstone.
- Lizzie McDonald, who died May 7, 1875, aged 36 years. This grave is west of the preceding; has a high marble headstone; and is enclosed with four posts single uniting rails.
- Row 17. John Drysdale, who died 24 May 1845, aged 62 years. Ann Drysdale, daur of John and Lois H. Drysdale, born on 22 June 1823; died at St. Augustine, 14 January 1844. Forty lines of inscription, the last words of which are "beloved friend and pastor, Rev. Joseph H. Rutledge, of Trinity Church of St. Augustine." "Thomas W. Drysdale, who departed this life at St. Augustine, 11th day of October, 1841, in the 17th year of his age." Thirteen lines of inscription follow.

The above, each covered with horizontal marble slab on raised cement foundation, differ only in length. The middle slab is quite a foot longer than the other two. A low coquina curb around the three.

- Elizabeth Mary Hanson, wife of J.M. Hanson, obit May 14, 1838, aged 82 years. Eleven lines of inscription follow. A horizontal marble slab on a brick raised foundation. Space for another grave. This lot cement curbed.
- Henry V. S. Frey, son of Henry and Elizabeth Frey. He was born at Palatine, in the State of New York, 27th day of Dec. 1807, and died at S. Augustine, 8th day Jan. 1830, aged 22 years, 12 days. A high, vertical headstone.
- "Erected to the memory of Lieut. Stephen Tuttle of the United States Corps of Engineers, a native of the State of New Jersey, who departd this life Jan. 21, 1835, aged 36 years." This stone, perhaps once erect, now lies horizontally, partly covering the raised cement grave. (Reinterred St. Augustine National Cemetery)
- Lucy, wife of F.E. Mitchell, died Feb. 18, 1884, aged 42 years. A low marble headstone and footstone.
- Rev. Parker Adams of New Hartford, Oneida Co., New York, who died in St. Augustine, 10th day of June, 1835, aged 56 years. A vertical marble head and footstone.
- Marian Anita and John Cobb, infant children of George and Louisa H. Washington. (No dates.) (On the footstone there are 3 initials, M. A. W., J. C. W., and J. A. W.) Low marble head and footstone within a fence of posts and light square rails.
- Jonathan Olivar Whaley, born Oct. 18,1879: died June 11, 1880, aged 8 months. A wooden headboard and wooden curb to grave.
- Edward McGraw, born May 18, 1863; died Nov. 16, 1877. A low wooden headboard. A low wooden headboard two feet away from above with inscription destroyed: perhaps a relative of E. McG. *Venice Johnson, born 1859; died Nov. 23, 1874. The inscription just decipherable. The head and footboard painted black; perhaps grave of colored man or woman.
- Lewis Drysdale, died Dec. 2, 1857, aet. 27. Perhaps other persons buried in western part of lot. A horizontal slab considerabley moved. This grave is in the western part of the Drysdale lot, the wall of which is in a ruinous condition.
- Row 18. A sacred Dedication by an affectionate mother to the memory of her son, Alfred Robinson, born at Richmond, Virginia, Oct. 26, 1815; died 1st of Decem. 1834, aged 19 years, 1 mo. 5 d. A vertical slab and footstone.
- Mrs. Mary, wife of Rev. Aaron Warner, of Medford, Mass., who died June 12, 1834, aged 45 years. A vertical head and footstone.
- Andrew J. Peck, son of G. D. Peck, M.D., and Mrs. S. F. Peck, of Milford, Mass., drowned near Saint Augustine, Apr. 19, 1835, aged 20. An upright head and footstone.
- Erastus Nye, of Onodaga Co., New York, who died January 12, 1835, aged 35 yrs. 6 mos. An upright headstone.
- John Lyman, of Southampton, Mass., died January 20, 1835, aet. 26 years. An upright headstone.
- John Gifford Hull, of Dutchess Co., New York, born May, 1808; died January 1835. An upright headstone.
- David Merriman, of Watertown, Conn. A vertical headstone buried so that balance of inscription cannot be copied.
- Nellie Van Dorn, died Oct. 10, 1875, aged 8 years, 10mos. 11 days. Wooded headboard with paling fence around lot in frail condition.
- Row 19. Col. Lucious D. Mower, of Granville, Ohio, who departed this life whilst on a visiti to this city for the benefit of his health on the 19 day of Feb. 1834, aged 41 years. An upright head and footstone.
- Hardinia M. Burnley, daughter of Hardin and Mary Burnley, of Hanover Co., Virginia, died 6 March 1834, of consumption, aged 24 years, 7 mos. An upright headstone. (A grave with heavy wooden curbing, but no inscription adjoining the above.)
- Matthew Peck, a native of Berlin, Conn., who died after a lingering illness June 5, 1834, in the 39th year of his age. A square column with capital and base, and obelisk above, of coarse grained marble.
- Ella Bond Reynolds, born Dec. 10, 1862; taken home Nov. 28, 1877. A vertical marble headstone. A grave enclosed with iron railing adjoining above, but no tombstone.
- Row 20. Eliza C Whitehouse, who died in this city (St. Augustine) 3 June 1838, aged 52 years. A flat slab on the marble faced raised foundation.
- "Charles Downing, who departed this life Nov. 24, 1841, in the 45th year of his age. A native of Virginia, he removed to Florida and early became identified with the prosperity of the Territory. He frequently served in the Territorial Legislature, and was twice elected to the Congress of the United States. Ardent, bold, and generous to a fault, he was beloved in life and died universally regretted." A marble slab on a raised coquina foundation.
- Eliza Archer, died Nov. 20, 18(73) or 78, aged 45 years. A wooden headboard.
- "Joseph L. Smith, died May 25, 1846, aet. 69. A colonel in the army of the United States in the War of 1812, and sometime judge of the Superior Court in the Territory of Florida. To great assiduity in the performance of his duties he united a dignity and learning which adorned his office, and to a commanding presence were added the higher attributes of distinguished ability." Marble upright head and footstones with iron railing.
- "Dr. Samuel Robinson, a native of Attleboro', Mass., and during 18 years a celebrated physician of Indiantown, N.C. From early life he was a sincere and consistent Christian, and a number of his last years were much devoted to the Bible cause chiefly in the southern States. In 1824 he removed to Providence, R.I., where he became eminent as a mineralogist. He died in this place Feb. 17, 1826, in the 44th year of his age." Marble vertical head and footstone. A large cedar tree close to the footstone. A lot with two graves marked with cement headstones, but no inscriptions thereon. A smaller lot to north of above without stones. Both these are fenced.

Grave not marked during Leed's 1893 survey:

- George C. Bowers: 1827 -1884, captain 10th Florida Infantry, Company I.

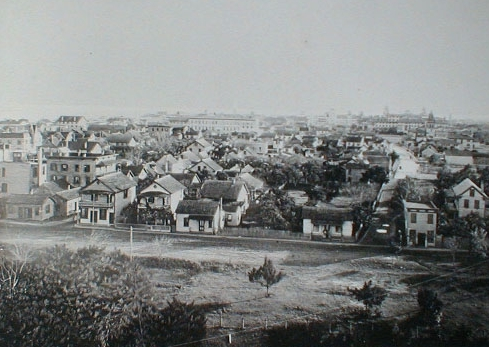
View of St. Augustine (1891) from the former San Marco Hotel, Spanish St. on left, Huguenot Cemetery lower left corner, Cordova St on right looking toward Ponce de Leon Hotel
