= Edmund Kirby Smith Hall =

Dormitory at Louisiana State University

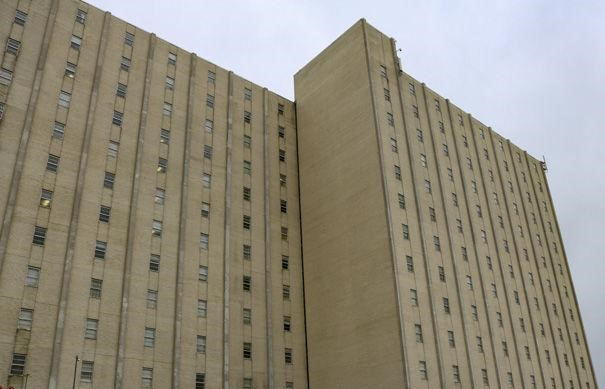
- Edmund Kirby Smith Hall in 2019

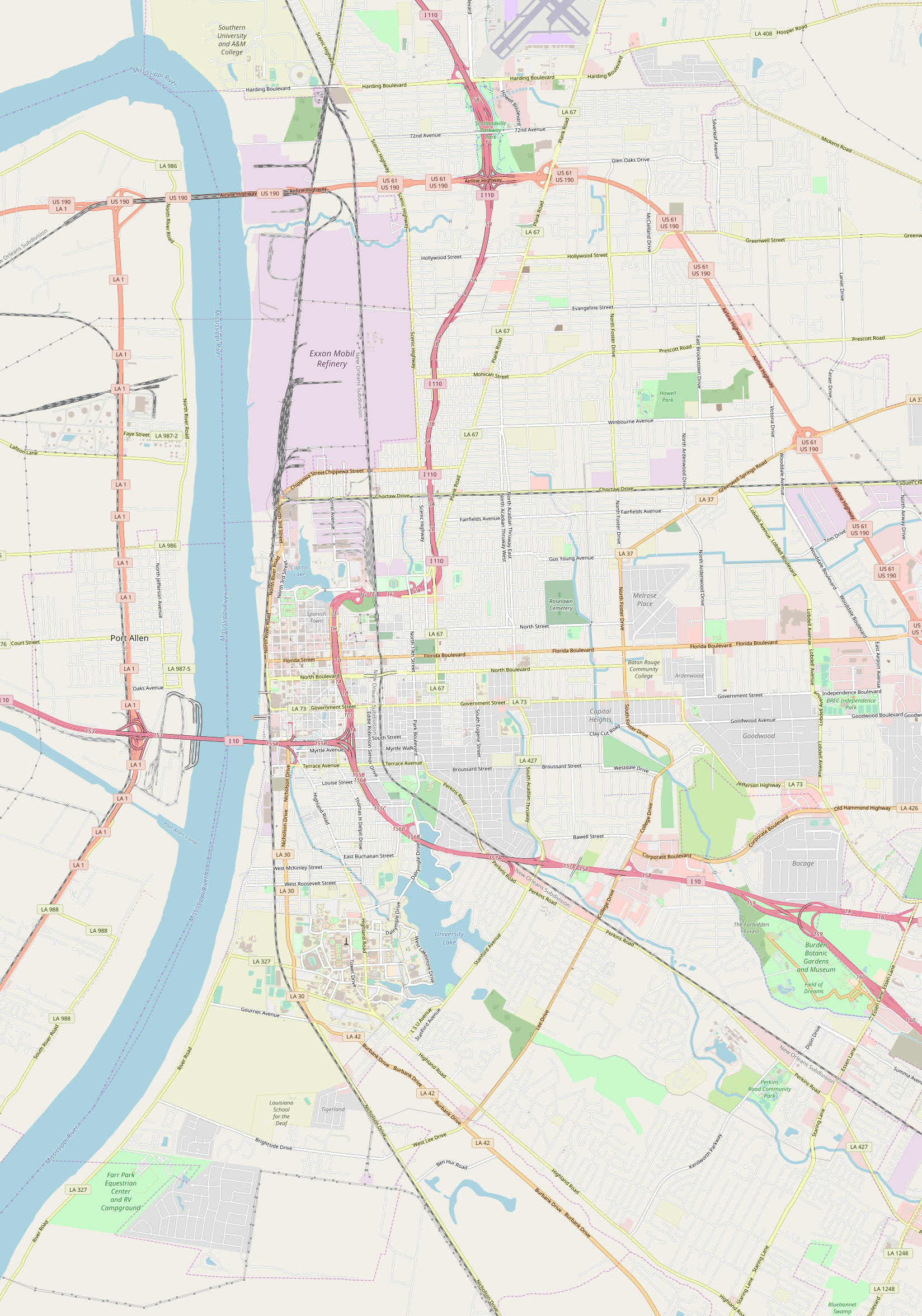
- Location within Baton Rouge

General information
- Status: Demolished
- Location: Baton Rouge, Louisiana, United States
- Coordinates: 30.481°N 91.1817°W
- Year built: 1965
- Demolished: May 17 – July 26, 2022

Technical details
- Floor count: 13

Edmund Kirby Smith Hall was a dormitory at Louisiana State University in Baton Rouge.

The building was named for Confederate States Army General Edmund Kirby Smith. The rooms of the 13 story dormitory contained a communal living area with two bedrooms containing a bathroom and space for two students. The cost for a two-student room in the dormitory was $2,915 in 2013.

In February 2022, LSU announced plans to demolish the deteriorating building after years of calls for its removal. With high demand for on-campus housing options, it was not until the addition of Azalea Hall and Camellia Hall that the university was able to move forward with the demolition. The building was dismantled one floor at a time, from May 17 to July 26, 2022. The space will become a green-space.
