= Mount Zion AME Church (Jacksonville, Florida) =

Historic church in Florida, United States

- U.S. National Register of Historic Places
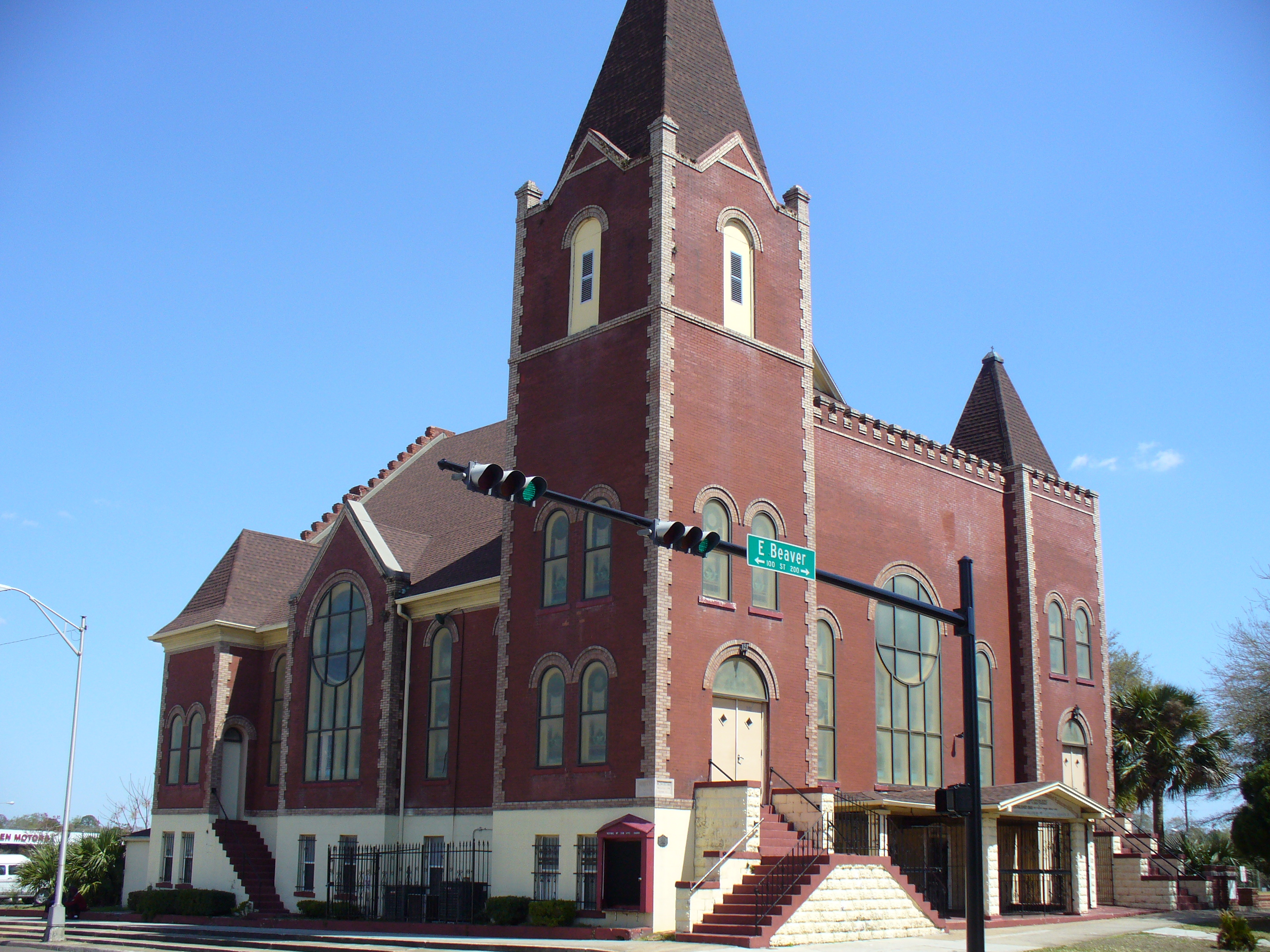
- Mt Zion Church, Jacksonville, FL

- Location within Florida Location within the United States
- Location: Jacksonville, Duval County, Florida
- Coordinates: 30°19′51″N 81°38′9″W
- Architectural style: Romanesque
- NRHP reference No.: 92001697
- Added to NRHP: December 30, 1992

The Mount Zion AME Church is a historic church in Jacksonville, Florida, United States. It is located at 201 East Beaver Street. On December 30, 1992, it was added to the U.S. National Register of Historic Places. The "AME" is an abbreviation of African Methodist Episcopal, the religious denomination.

After the Civil War, several dozen Freedmen organized a "Society" for the purpose of religious worship. On July 28, 1866, this group became formally recognized as Mount Zion A.M.E. Church. The church acquired the property at the northeast corner of Beaver and Newnan Streets, and a small frame structure was built for worship services on that site. In 1870 a large wooden church was built, and twenty years later an even larger brick sanctuary, with a seating capacity of nearly 1,500, was built at this location.

Within four months after the Great Fire of 1901 destroyed that building, plans for the present church were under way. According to a September, 1901 newspaper report, the Romanesque Revival style structure was estimated to cost $18,000. Architectural details such as arched window and door openings, art-glass windows, a bell tower, contrasting brick quoins, and a crenelated parapet contribute to its handsome design. The building was completed in 1905 and was designed by architects J. B. Carr & Co. of Birmingham and Francis J. Norton of Jacksonville & Chicago.
