= Lucien Bonaparte Webster =

- Born: March 17, 1801; Hartland, Windsor County, Vermont
- Died: November 4, 1853 Fort Brown, Cameron County, Texas
- Allegiance: United States of America
- Service years: 1823–1853
- Rank: Brevet Lieutenant Colonel
- Conflicts: Mexican–American War Battle of Monterey Battle of Buena Vista

Lucien Bonaparte Webster (March 17, 1801 – November 4, 1853) was a career United States Army officer from Vermont who served in the Mexican–American War and at Fort Brown in Texas. In 1837 he married Frances Marvin Smith of Vermont and Florida, and they had five children. He achieved the rank of brevet lieutenant colonel before his death in Texas while on active duty.

Frances Smith's younger brother was Edmund Kirby Smith, also a West Point graduate and career officer who was one of seven generals in the Confederate Army and the last to surrender.

== Life and career ==
Lucien Bonaparte Webster was born in rural Hartland, Vermont, the son of Laban Webster and his wife Lucy Wright. A younger child in a large family, he was educated locally, following his brothers. His oldest brother Horace graduated from the United States Military Academy at West Point and had an initial assignment there as a mathematics teacher. He helped Lucien get an appointment to the Academy in 1819. Webster graduated in 1823, ranked sixth in a class of 35. He was commissioned as a brevet Second Lieutenant of artillery, considered the second best assignment after the Corps of Engineers.

In 1836, Webster was assigned to Fort Marion in St. Augustine, Florida, as the Seminole people's resistance to removal became more fierce. He had served in seven posts during the previous thirteen years. There he met his future wife, Frances Marvin Smith, the niece of his commanding officer. She was born in Litchfield, Connecticut, and her family had moved to Florida in 1823 when her father Joseph Lee Smith was appointed as a judge of the superior court.

In 1838, Webster participated in the Army's removal of Cherokee Native Americans from North Carolina, who were forced on the Trail of Tears to Indian Territory west of the Mississippi River. During ten years of teaching at West Point, he was promoted to captain. Webster served in the US Army during the Mexican-American War. He died of yellow fever on 04 Nov 1853 while stationed at Fort Brown, Cameron County, Texas.

== Marriage and family ==
Webster married Frances Marvin Smith on December 21, 1837 in Saint Augustine, Florida. Her younger brother, Edmund Kirby Smith, later graduated from West Point and, during the American Civil War, became one of seven full generals of the Confederate Army.

The Websters had five children: Josephine (named after a deceased sister of Frances's), Katharine (Nov 1842 – May 1843, died in infancy), daughter Frances (named after her mother), Lucien Jr. (Mar–Aug 1848, died in infancy), and Edmund Kirby Webster (named after his maternal uncle, then a U.S. Army officer).
