= Edmund Kirby Smith =

Confederate States Army general (1824–1893)

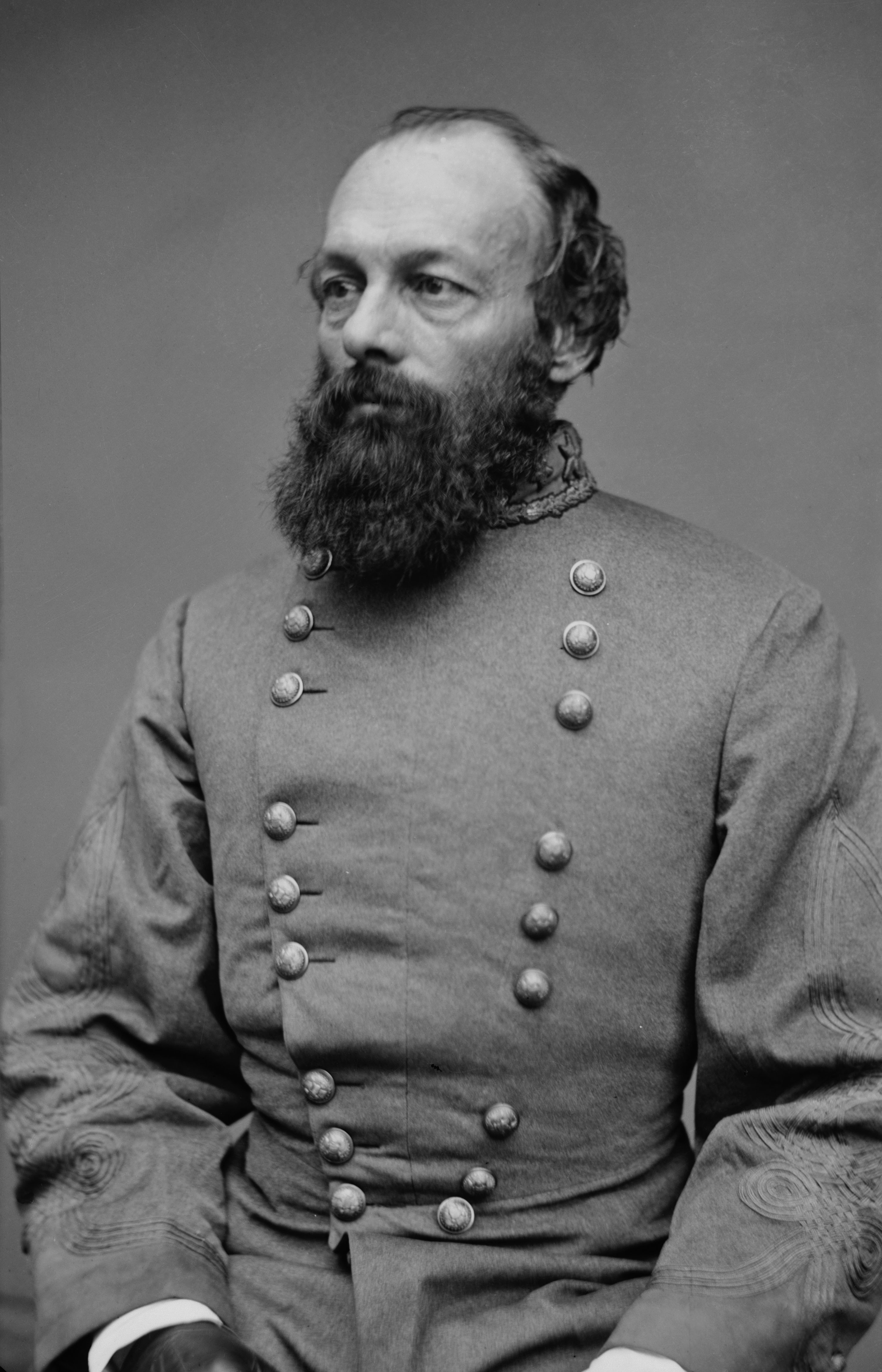
- Smith in uniform, c. 1862
- Born: May 16, 1824; St. Augustine, Florida, U.S.
- Died: March 28, 1893 (aged 68); Sewanee, Tennessee, U.S.
- Burial place: University Cemetery, Sewanee, Tennessee, U.S.
- Education: United States Military Academy
- Military career
- Allegiance: United States; Confederate States
- Branch: United States Army; Confederate States Army
- Service years: 1845–1861 (U.S.); 1861–1865 (C.S.)
- Rank: Major (U.S.); General (C.S.)
- Nicknames: "Ted", "Seminole"
- Commands: 3d Corps, Army of Tennessee; Trans-Mississippi Department
- Wars: Mexican–American War; American Civil War

Edmund Kirby Smith (May 16, 1824 – March 28, 1893) was a Confederate States Army general, who oversaw the Trans-Mississippi Department (comprising Arkansas, Missouri, Texas, western Louisiana, Arizona Territory and the Indian Territory) from 1863 to 1865. Before the American Civil War, Smith served as an officer of the United States Army.

Smith was wounded at the First Battle of Bull Run and distinguished himself during the Heartland Offensive, the Confederacy's unsuccessful attempt to capture Kentucky in 1862. He was appointed as commander of the Trans-Mississippi Department in January 1863. The area included most actions east of the Rocky Mountains and west of the Mississippi River. In 1863, Smith dispatched troops in an unsuccessful attempt to relieve the Siege of Vicksburg. After the United States took control of Vicksburg in July, the Trans-Mississippi Department was cut off from the rest of the Confederacy and became virtually an independent nation, nicknamed "Kirby Smithdom".

In the Red River Campaign of Spring 1864, he commanded victorious Confederate troops under Major-General Richard Taylor, who defeated a combined Union Army and Navy assault under U.S. Major-General Nathaniel P. Banks. On June 2, 1865, Smith surrendered his army at Galveston, Texas, the last general with a major field force.

He quickly fled to Mexico and then to Cuba to avoid arrest for treason. His wife negotiated his return during the period when the U.S. government offered amnesty to those who would take an oath of loyalty to the United States. After the war, Smith worked in the telegraph and railway industries. He also served as a professor of mathematics at the University of the South in Tennessee. He botanized plant specimens and bequeathed his collection to the University of Florida.

== Early life and education ==
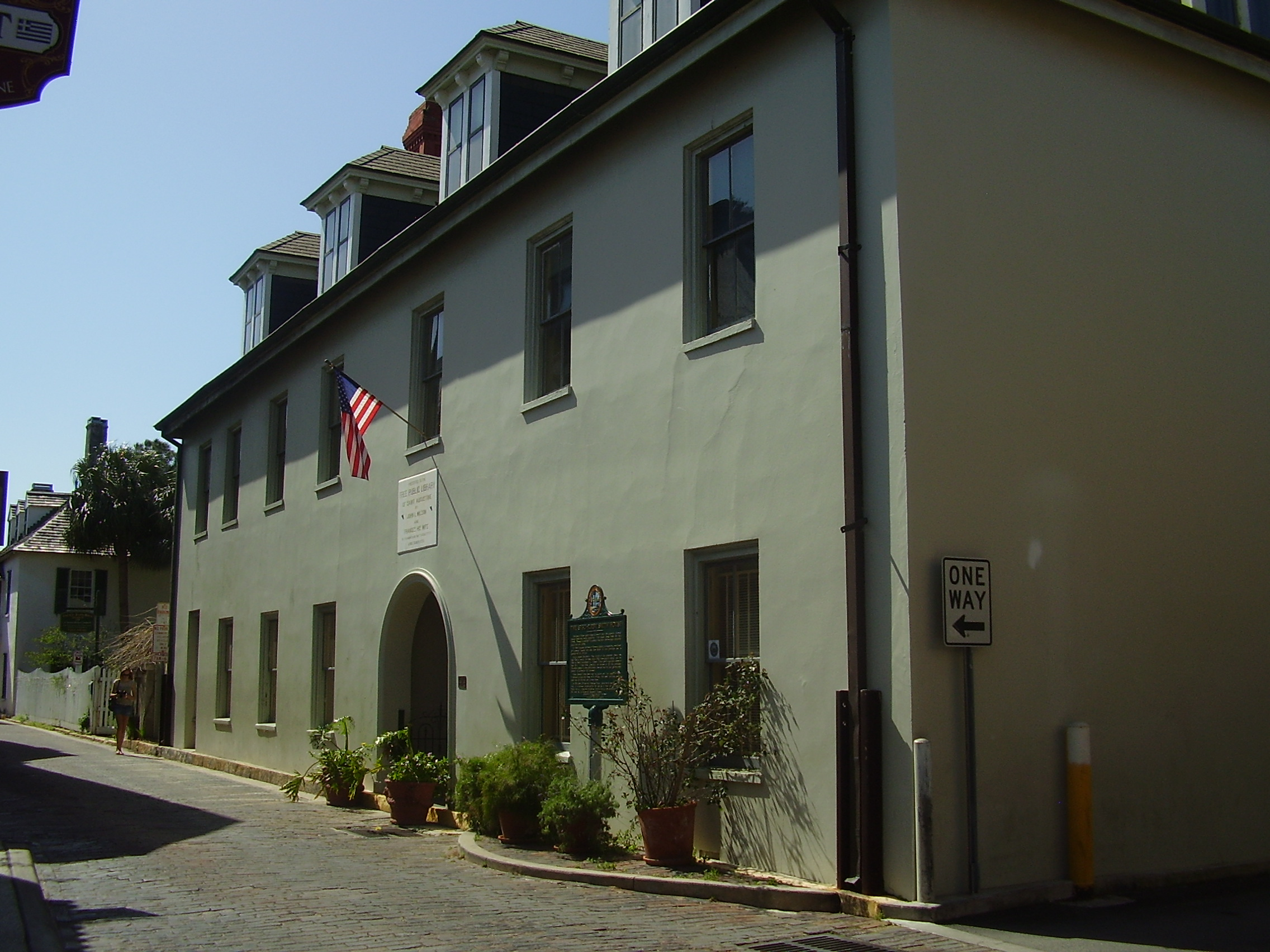
Edmund Kirby Smith's boyhood home at St. Augustine, Florida

Edmund Kirby Smith was born in 1824 in St. Augustine, Florida, as the youngest child of Joseph Lee Smith, an attorney, and Frances (née Kirby) Smith. Both his parents were natives of Litchfield, Connecticut, where their older children were born. The family moved to Florida in 1821, as the senior Smith was appointed as a Superior Court judge in the new Florida Territory, acquired by the U.S. from Spain. Older siblings included Ephraim, born in 1807; and sisters Frances, born in 1809, and Josephine, who died in 1835, likely of tuberculosis. He was interested in botany and nature, but in 1836, Smith's parents sent their second son to a military boarding school in Virginia, and strongly encouraged a military career. He later enrolled in the United States Military Academy.

In 1837, his sister Frances married Lucien Bonaparte Webster, a West Point graduate from Vermont and career U.S. Army artillery officer, whom she met when he was stationed at Fort Marion in St. Augustine. His commanding officer at the fort was the young Smiths' uncle. Webster later served in the Mexican–American War and died of yellow fever in 1853 when stationed on the Texas frontier at Fort Brown.

On July 1, 1841, Smith entered West Point and was graduated four years later in 1845, ranking 25th out of 41 cadets. While there, he was nicknamed "Seminole", after the Seminole people of Florida who had successfully resisted removal by the United States. He was commissioned as a brevet second lieutenant in the 5th U.S. Infantry on July 1, 1845. Smith was promoted to second lieutenant on August 22, 1846, now serving in the 7th U.S. Infantry.

== Early military career ==
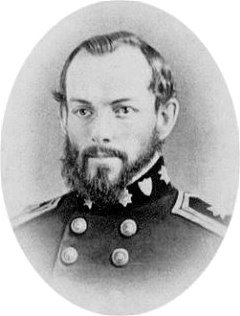
Smith in uniform, 1861

In the Mexican–American War, Smith served under General Zachary Taylor at the Battle of Palo Alto and the Battle of Resaca de la Palma. He later served under General Winfield Scott and received brevet promotions to first lieutenant for Cerro Gordo and to captain for Contreras and Churubusco. His older brother, Ephraim Kirby Smith (1807–1847), who was graduated from West Point in 1826 and was a captain in the regular army, served with him in the 5th U.S. Infantry in the campaigns with both Taylor and Scott. Ephraim died in 1847 from wounds suffered at the Battle of Molino del Rey.

After that war, Smith served as a captain (from 1855) in the 2nd U.S. Cavalry, primarily in Texas. From that year on through the war, Smith was accompanied by the youth Alexander Darnes, then 15, a mixed-race person enslaved by his family, who was forced to work as his valet until emancipation and who may have been his half-brother.

Smith also taught at West Point after the war. He collected and studied materials as a botanist; like many other military officers, he was also a scientist. He donated to the Smithsonian Institution some of his collection and reports from his time at West Point. Smith continued his botanical studies as a hobby for the remainder of his life. He is credited with collecting and describing several species of plants native to Tennessee and Florida. Smith was assigned to teach mathematics at West Point from 1849 to 1852. According to his letters to his mother, he was happy with this environment.

Returning to troop-leading assignments, Smith served in the Southwest. On May 13, 1859, he was wounded in his thigh while fighting Comanche in the Nescutunga Valley of Kansas. also known as the Battle of Crooked Creek (Kansas). When Texas declared secession from the United States in 1861, Smith, promoted to major on January 31, 1861, refused to surrender his command at Camp Colorado in what is now Coleman, to the Texas State Troops under Colonel Benjamin McCulloch; he expressed his willingness to fight to hold it. On April 6, he resigned his commission in the United States Army to join the Confederacy.

== Civil War ==
On March 16, 1861, Smith entered the Confederate States Army as a major in the regular artillery; that day, he was transferred to the regular cavalry with the rank of lieutenant-colonel. After serving briefly as Brigadier-General Joseph E. Johnston's assistant adjutant general in the Shenandoah Valley, Smith was promoted to brigadier-general on June 17, 1861. He was given command of a brigade in the Army of the Shenandoah, which he led at the First Battle of Bull Run on July 21. Wounded severely in the neck and shoulder, he recuperated while commanding the Department of Middle and East Florida. He returned to duty on October 11 as a major-general and division commander in the Army of Northern Virginia.

=== Army of Tennessee ===
In February 1862, Smith was sent west to command the eastern division of the Army of Mississippi (often referred to prematurely as the Army of Tennessee). Cooperating with General Braxton Bragg in the invasion of Kentucky, he scored a victory at the Battle of Richmond, Kentucky on August 30, 1862, but did not link up with Bragg's army until after the Battle of Perryville. On October 9, he was promoted to the newly created grade of lieutenant-general, commanding the 3d Corps, Army of Tennessee. Smith received the Confederate "Thanks of Congress" on February 17, 1864, for his actions at Richmond. (Note: "... for the signal victory achieved by him in the battle of Richmond, Kentucky, on the thirtieth of August, and to all officers and soldiers of his command engaged in that battle" (Eicher & Eicher 2001, p. 494).)

=== Trans-Mississippi Department ===
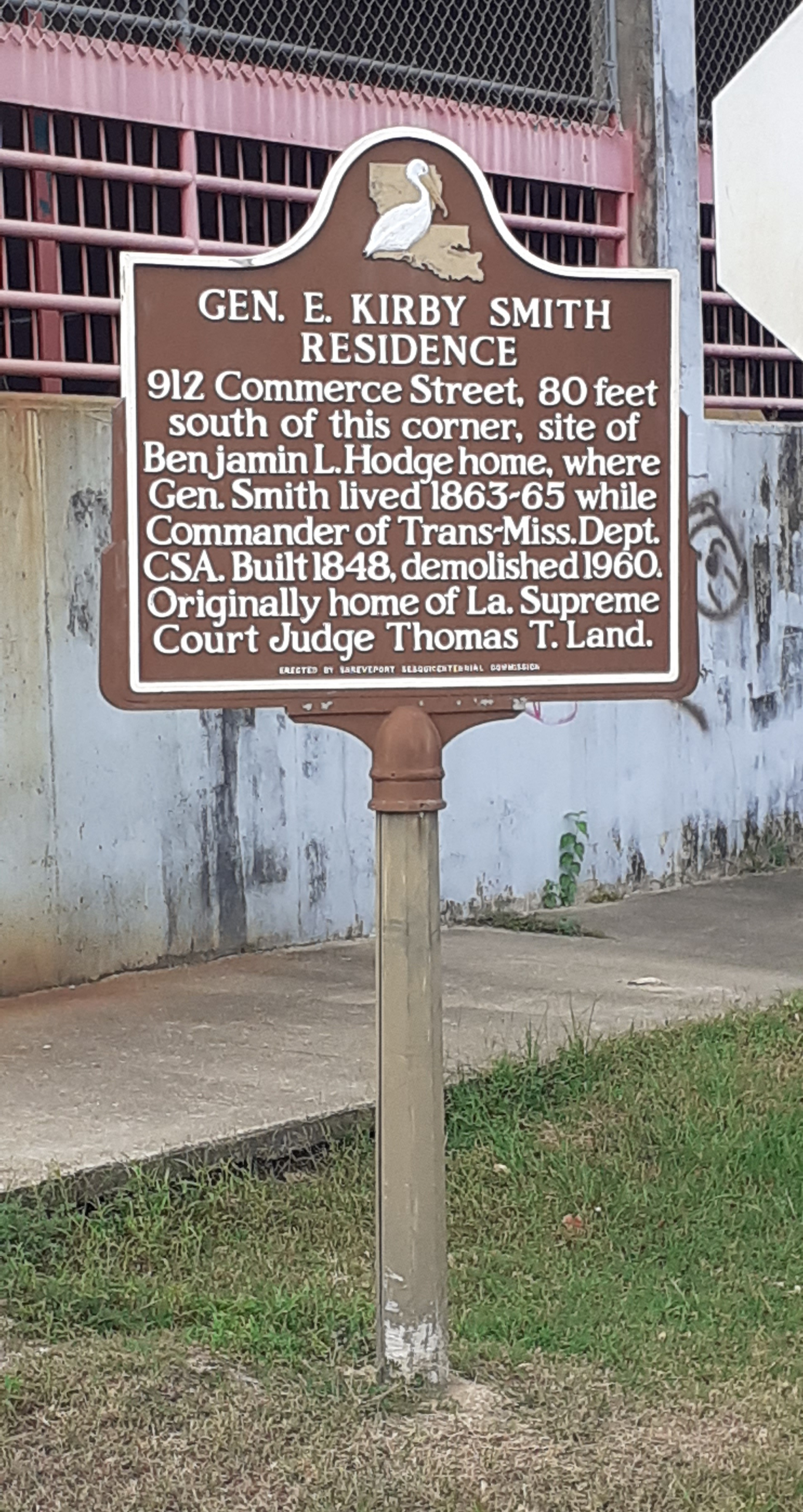
A plaque marking Smith's former residence at Shreveport, Louisiana

On January 14, 1863, Smith was transferred to command the Trans-Mississippi Department (comprising Arkansas, Missouri, Texas, western Louisiana, Arizona Territory, and the Indian Territory), where he reorganized the previously existing military departments into divisions, appointing his own commanders. He improved the logistics and finances of his department, and raised more manpower. He remained west of the Mississippi River for the balance of the war, based part of this time in Shreveport, Louisiana.

As forces under U.S. Major-General Ulysses S. Grant tightened their grip on the river, Smith attempted to intervene. However, his department never had more than 30,000 men stationed over an immense area, and he could not concentrate forces adequately to challenge Grant or the U.S. Navy on the river.

Following the Union capture of the remaining strongholds at Vicksburg and Port Hudson resulting in the closing of the Mississippi to the Confederacy, Smith was virtually cut off from the Confederate capital at Richmond. He had to command a nearly independent area of the Confederacy, with all the inherent administrative problems. The area became known in the Confederacy as "Kirby Smithdom". He was thought of as a virtual military dictator and negotiated directly with foreign countries.

On April 8, 1864, General Richard Taylor, directly under Smith's command, soundly defeated a combined Union Army and Navy incursion into the Trans-Missippippi under General Nathaniel P. Banks at the Battle of Mansfield in the Red River Campaign. After the Battle of Pleasant Hill on April 9, Smith joined Taylor and dispatched half of Taylor's army, Walker's Greyhounds, under the command of Major-General John George Walker, northward to defeat U.S. Major-General Frederick Steele's incursion into Arkansas. This decision, vehemently opposed by Taylor, caused great enmity between the two men.

With the pressure relieved to the north, Smith attempted to send reinforcements east of the Mississippi. But, as in the case of his earlier attempts to relieve Vicksburg, it proved impossible due to U.S. Navy control of the river. Instead, he dispatched Major-General Sterling Price, with all available cavalry, on an unsuccessful invasion of Missouri. He conducted the war west of the river through small raids and guerrilla warfare.

By now a full general (as of February 19, 1864, one of seven full generals in the Confederate Army), Smith negotiated the surrender of his department on May 26, 1865. While Brigadier General Stand Watie and the 1st Cherokee Mounted Rifles regiment did not surrender until June 23, 1865, Smith was the last full general to do so and signed the terms of surrender in Galveston, Texas, on June 2, nearly eight weeks after Robert E. Lee's surrender. He immediately left the country for Mexico and then to Cuba, to escape potential prosecution for treason.

In August of that year, General Beauregard's house near New Orleans was surrounded by Federal troops who suspected the general of harboring Smith. All the inhabitants were locked in a cotton press overnight. Beauregard complained to General Sheridan, who expressed annoyance at the treatment of the high-ranking officer, his erstwhile enemy.

Kirby Smith later found exile in Mexico, alongside Prince John Magruder, James E. Slaughter, and other Confederate émigré. His amnesty having been negotiated by his wife, Smith returned to the United States later that year to take an oath of loyalty at Lynchburg, Virginia, on November 14, 1865.

== Later life ==
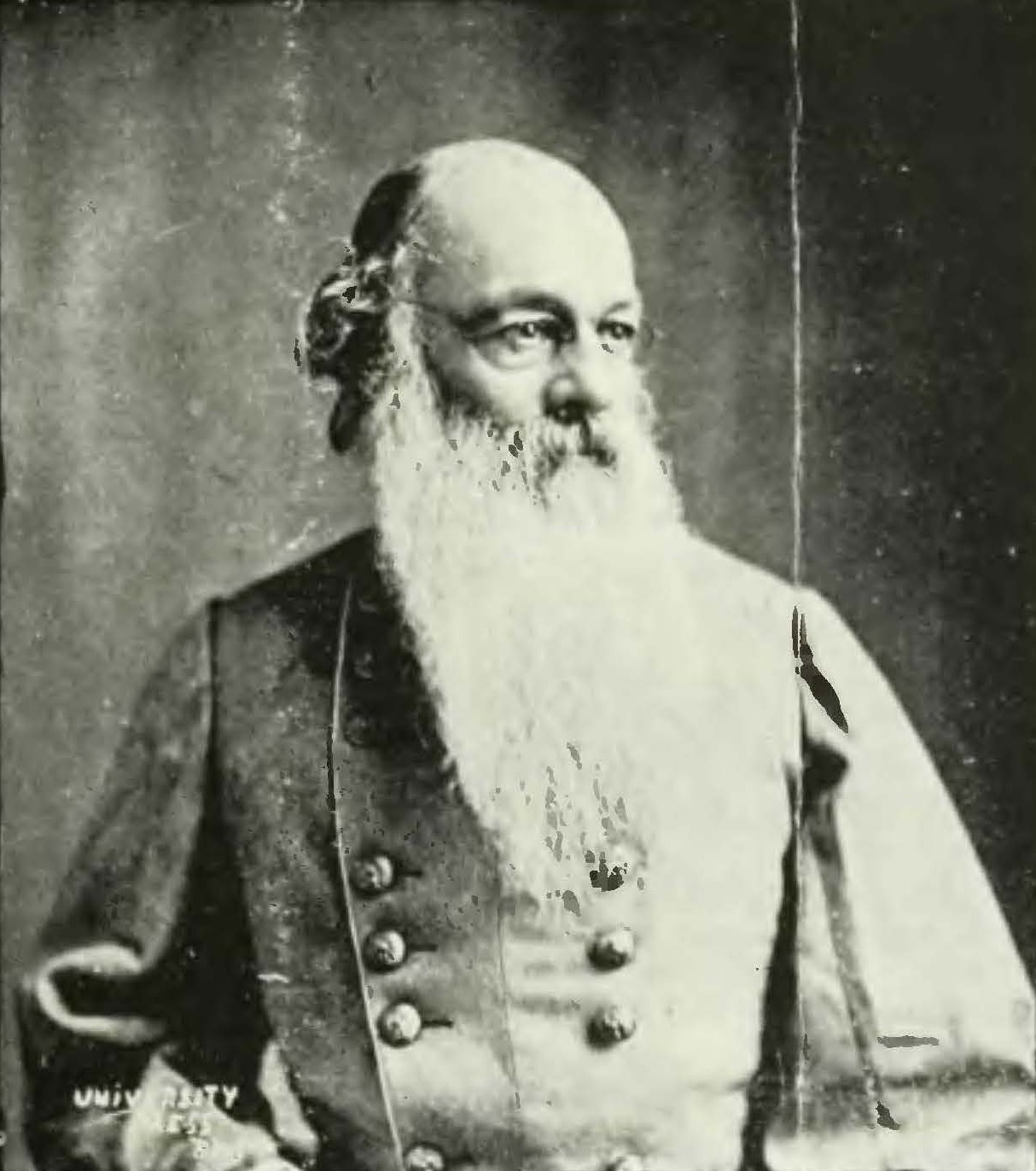
Smith in later life

After the war, Smith was active in the telegraph business and higher education. From 1866 to 1868, he was president of the Atlantic and Pacific Telegraph Company. When that effort failed, he started a preparatory school in New Castle, Kentucky, which he directed until it burned in 1870. He served as the chancellor of the University of Nashville from 1870 to 1875. He headed the newly created Montgomery Bell Academy there, with former Confederate General Bushrod Johnson as principal.

In 1875, Smith left that post to become a professor of mathematics and botany at the University of the South at Sewanee, Tennessee. Part of his collection from those years was donated to the universities of North Carolina and Harvard, and to the Smithsonian Institution. He kept up a correspondence with botanists at other institutions. He taught at the University of the South until he died of pneumonia in 1893. He was the last surviving full general from the Civil War. He is buried in the University Cemetery at Sewanee.

== Personal life ==
In August 1861, Smith met Cassie Selden (1836–1905), the daughter of Samuel S. Selden of Lynchburg. While recovering from being wounded at the First Battle of Manassas, he still found time for wooing. The couple married on September 24. Cassie wrote on October 10, 1862, from Lynchburg, asking what to name their first child. She suggested, "something uncommon as I consider her an uncommon baby." The new baby was later named Caroline.

The couple briefly reunited when Cassie followed her husband to Shreveport in February 1863. In the spring of 1864, she moved to Hempstead, Texas, where she remained for the duration of the war. After the war's end, Cassie traveled to Washington to negotiate for her husband's return to the United States from Cuba, where he had fled.

In 1875, Smith accepted an appointment as a professor at the University of the South in Sewanee, Tennessee. There the family lived happily until the end of his life. They had five sons and six daughters: Caroline (1862–1941), Frances (1864–1930), Edmund (1866–1938), Lydia (1868–1962), Nina (1870–1965), Elizabeth (1872–1937), Reynold (1874–1962), William (1876–1967), Josephine (1878–1961), Joseph Lee (1882–1939), and Ephraim (1884–1938).

Reynold, William, Joseph, and Ephraim all played for the Sewanee Tigers football team. Joseph and Ephraim both achieved All-Southern status in football. Joseph was a member of the famed 1899 "Iron Men" and Ephraim was selected for Sewanee's All-Time football team.

== Legacy ==
- A dormitory building on the campus of LSU in Baton Rouge was named Edmund Kirby Smith Hall. It was demolished in 2022.
- A portrait of Edmund Kirby Smith by Cornelius Hankins hangs in the Wyatt Center at Vanderbilt University.
- In 1922, the state of Florida erected a statue of General Smith as one of Florida's two statues in the National Statuary Hall Collection of the United States Capitol in Washington, D.C. (The other is of John Gorrie, inventor of mechanical refrigeration and air conditioning.) On March 19, 2018, Florida Governor Rick Scott signed legislation to replace the statue with one of African-American civil rights activist and educator Mary McLeod Bethune. The statue was to be moved to the Lake County Historical Museum in Tavares, after residents of his birthplace, St. Augustine, expressed no interest. While Smith never lived in Lake County, when he was born, it was a part of St. Johns County, whose seat is St. Augustine. At a County Commission meeting on July 24, 2018, about 24 residents spoke against, and none in favor, of bringing the statue to Lake County. Chairman Sullivan assured the crowd that the commission would tell the Historical Museum "that there is no longer a want or desire to bring this statue to Lake County". Despite the strong opposition from the public and nine mayors in the county, the Board of County Commissioners voted on August 6, 2019, to approve the statue installation. Hundreds protested the transfer of the statue to Lake County on August 10, 2019, and citizen groups posted an online petition voicing opposition to the project, whose local sponsor was the Sons of Confederate Veterans. On July 7, 2020, Lake County commissioners voted 4–1 against accepting the statue.
- At the University of the South, in Sewanee, Tennessee, where he taught, he is commemorated by Kirby-Smith Point.
- The Kirby-Smith Chapter of the United Daughters of the Confederacy at Sewanee, and the Kirby-Smith Camp 1209, Sons of Confederate Veterans, in Jacksonville, Florida, are named for him.
- Kirby Smith Middle School in Jacksonville was named for him. It was renamed Springfield Middle School in 2021.
- During World War II the 422-foot (129 m) liberty ship SS E. Kirby Smith was built in Panama City, Florida, in 1943, and named for him.
- In 2004, a life-sized statue of Kirby Smith and Alexander Darnes in an imaginary meeting (see below) was made by Maria Kirby Smith, a great-granddaughter of Smith. It is installed in the courtyard of the Segui-Kirby Smith House, now owned by the St. Augustine Historical Society. This is the first public sculpture in the city to commemorate an African-American man. Kirby-Smith said that she suspected Darnes was related to Smith as a half-brother or nephew, as her detailed work on the statues made her aware of the two men's close physical resemblance.
- Joseph H. Parks’s comprehensive biography of Confederate General Edmund Kirby Smith, originally published in 1954 and reissued by LSU Press in 1992, provides a critical analysis of his military tenure, his administration of the Trans-Mississippi Department, and his professional career during the post-war period.

== See also ==
- List of Confederate States Army generals
- List of people from St. Augustine, Florida
