= St. Augustine Historical Society =

Historical society in Florida, US

The Saint Augustine Historical Society (SAHS) is a membership organization committed to the preservation and interpretation of historically significant structures, artifacts, and documentary materials related to St. Augustine, Florida. Formally organized on New Years Day 1883, SAHS is the oldest continuously operating museum and historical society in Florida. In 1899, the society purchased the Vedder Museum on Bay Street where it exhibited historical and scientific curiosities until losing its holdings in the Saint Augustine Fire of 1914. In 1920, SAHS successfully lobbied for federal restoration of Fort Matanzas, and in 1965, it played a significant role in the restoration of numerous historic sites in preparation for the Saint Augustine quadricentennial.

The Society has been a primary force in the preservation and care of four historic Spanish colonial homes, including the González-Alvarez House (The Oldest House), the Tovar House, and the Fernandez-Llambias House—all on Saint Francis Street—as well as the Segui-Kirby Smith House on the corner of Aviles Street and Artillery Lane. SAHS publishes El Escribano: The St. Augustine Journal of History, as well as the Society's newsletter the East Florida Gazette.

== The Oldest House Museum ==
The González-Alvarez House is the oldest surviving Spanish colonial dwelling in Saint Augustine, with evidence dating the site's occupancy from the 1600s, and the present house to the early 1700s. The house is located at 14 Saint Francis Street and exhibits both Spanish and British colonial architectural details and styles. It was designated a National Historic Landmark in 1970. The Oldest House Museum Complex includes the Tovar House, the Webb Museum, the Page L Edwards Gallery, an ornamental garden, and a museum store. First exhibited as a house museum in 1892, the building was acquired in 1918 by the Saint Augustine Historical Society.

== Research Library ==
The SAHS Research Library at the Segui-Kirby Smith House specializes in the history of Saint Augustine, colonial East Florida, and Saint Johns County. The collection includes maps, photographs, vertical subject files, church records, circuit court cases, city government records, manuscript collections, circuit court records, and biographical files. It is a closed-stack library with a small reference collection in the main reading room, and is free to the public. The two hundred and thirty-year-old building was built as a private residence and was the birthplace of Confederate General Edmund Kirby Smith (1824). Dr Alexander Darnes was enslaved on the property by the Smith family, and after emancipation became a medical pioneer in Jacksonville, Florida. The house was given in trust to the St. Augustine Library Association in 1895, and was a free public library until Saint Johns County erected a new facility in 1984.

== El Escribano ==
Since January 1955, El Escribano ("The Scribe") has been the annual publication of SAHS sent to members and libraries. The name is derived from the city's Spanish colonial history:

"In Spanish Saint Augustine, the Escribano, which freely translated means scribe or notary, was an important figure. One of the few in the frontier community who could write, he recorded events and testimony, and vouched for its accuracy. To him we owe much of what we know of early Saint Augustine, and it seems fitting, therefore, to name the newsletter of the Saint Augustine Historical Society in his honor."

== See also ==
- List of historical societies in Florida
