= Segui-Kirby Smith House =

Historic house in St. Augustine, Florida, U.S.

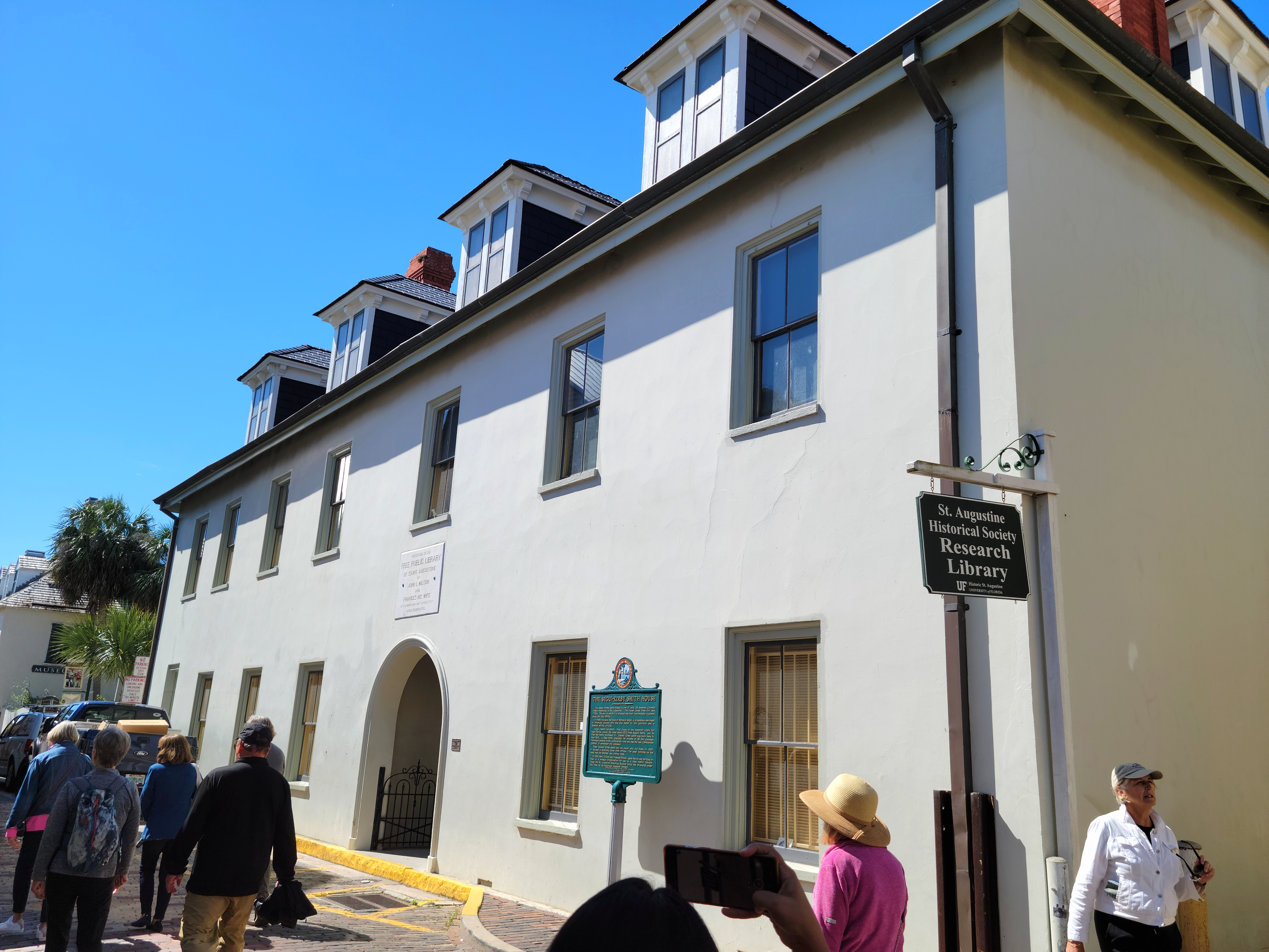
The main façade of the Segui-Kirby Smith House at St. Augustine in 2023.

The Segui-Kirby Smith House is a historic house at 12 Aviles Street in St. Augustine, Florida, United States. Built in the late 1770s, it was the childhood home of Confederate States Army General Edmund Kirby Smith, the commanding general of the Trans-Mississippi Department from 1863 to 1865 and the chancellor of the University of Nashville from 1870 to 1875. It is owned and operated by the St. Augustine Historical Society and is home to the St. Augustine Historical Society Research Library.

== History ==
The first record of a building at this lot appears in a Spanish map dated January 22, 1764. The building was most likely used as a dwelling during the First Spanish Period. During St. Augustine's British Period (1763-1783), the house belonged to a British Captain, Henry Skinner, and changed hands several times during the British occupation. St. Augustine was ceded back to the Spanish with the 1783 Treaty of Paris. At this time, a Menorcan man named Bernardo Segui bought the lot from Pablo Cortina; the home had a first floor made of coquina and a wooden second floor. The lot also accommodated a small two-room building on Artillery Lane. Bernardo and his wife had six children and most likely made additions to the dwelling.

In 1824, Bernardo Segui's widow rented out the house to Judge Joseph Lee Smith, a judge in the Supreme Court of Florida. Judge Smith's son Edmund Kirby Smith, who would go on to become a Confederate general, was born there. The Smith family later became full owners of the building. In 1863, the Union occupiers of St. Augustine banished Edmund's mother, Frances Kirby Smith, from the city on suspicion of spying for the Confederacy. Alexander Darnes, the son of the enslaved woman Violet Pinkney, also lived in the house. In 1855, Darnes left St. Augustine to serve as valet to Edmund Kirby Smith during his military service in the Western Territories and throughout the Civil War. After the South lost the war, Darnes went on to earn a medical degree in 1880 at Howard University, moved back to Florida, and became one of the first African American doctors in the state. In 1887 the Smiths sold the house to E.P. Dismukes. Mr. and Mrs. John L. Wilson bought the home in 1894. According to the will of the Wilsons, the Segui-Kirby Smith House was to be used as a library for the citizens of St. Augustine. At first it was the property of the St. Augustine Library Association. In 1894 a public library moved into the house, from the second story of what is now the Governor's House Museum and Cultural Center.

Outside the house on Aviles Street stands a historical marker designating the home as one of the thirty-six remaining Spanish Colonial homes in St. Augustine. Maria Kirby-Smith, great-granddaughter of Edmund Kirby Smith, completed a bronze statue of the general and of Darnes titled "Sons of St. Augustine" in 2004. The statue stands in the courtyard of the Segui-Kirby Smith House today (2020).

The house and its outbuildings are used by the St. Augustine Historical Society to serve as the location for its research library, archives, and collection storage. The space includes a public reading room.
