= 2011 ACC Championship Game =

2011 Dr. Pepper ACC Championship Game
- Conference Championship
| Virginia Tech Hokies | Clemson Tigers |
| (11–1) | (9–3) |
| 10 | 38 |
| Head coach: Frank Beamer | Head coach: Dabo Swinney |
| AP / Coaches / BCS; 5 / 3 / 5 | AP / Coaches / BCS; 21 / 21 / 20 |
| | 1 | 2 | 3 | 4 | Total |
|---|---|---|---|---|---|
| Virginia Tech | 7 | 3 | 0 | 0 | 10 |
| Clemson | 7 | 3 | 21 | 7 | 38 |
- Date: December 3, 2011
- Season: 2011
- Stadium: Bank of America Stadium
- Location: Charlotte, North Carolina
- MVP: Tajh Boyd (QB, Clemson)
- Favorite: Virginia Tech by 7
- National anthem: Marlee Scott
- Referee: Jerry Magallanes
- Halftime show: Dr. Pepper Tuition throw
- Attendance: 73,675

United States TV coverage
- Network: ESPN
- Announcers: Brent Musburger, Kirk Herbstreit and Heather Cox

2011 Atlantic Coast Conference football standings
| | Conf. | | | Overall |
| Team | W | | L | W | | L |
|---|---|---|---|---|---|---|
Atlantic Division
| No. 22 Clemson x$ | 6 | – | 2 | 10 | – | 4 |
| Wake Forest | 5 | – | 3 | 6 | – | 7 |
| No. 23 Florida State | 5 | – | 3 | 9 | – | 4 |
| NC State | 4 | – | 4 | 8 | – | 5 |
| Boston College | 3 | – | 5 | 4 | – | 8 |
| Maryland | 1 | – | 7 | 2 | – | 10 |
Coastal Division
| No. 21 Virginia Tech x% | 7 | – | 1 | 11 | – | 3 |
| Virginia | 5 | – | 3 | 8 | – | 5 |
| Georgia Tech | 5 | – | 3 | 8 | – | 5 |
| Miami (FL) | 3 | – | 5 | 6 | – | 6 |
| North Carolina | 3 | – | 5 | 7 | – | 6 |
| Duke | 1 | – | 7 | 3 | – | 9 |
Championship: Clemson 38, Virginia Tech 10
$ – BCS representative as conference champion; % – BCS at-large representative; x – Division champion/co-champions; Rankings from AP Poll

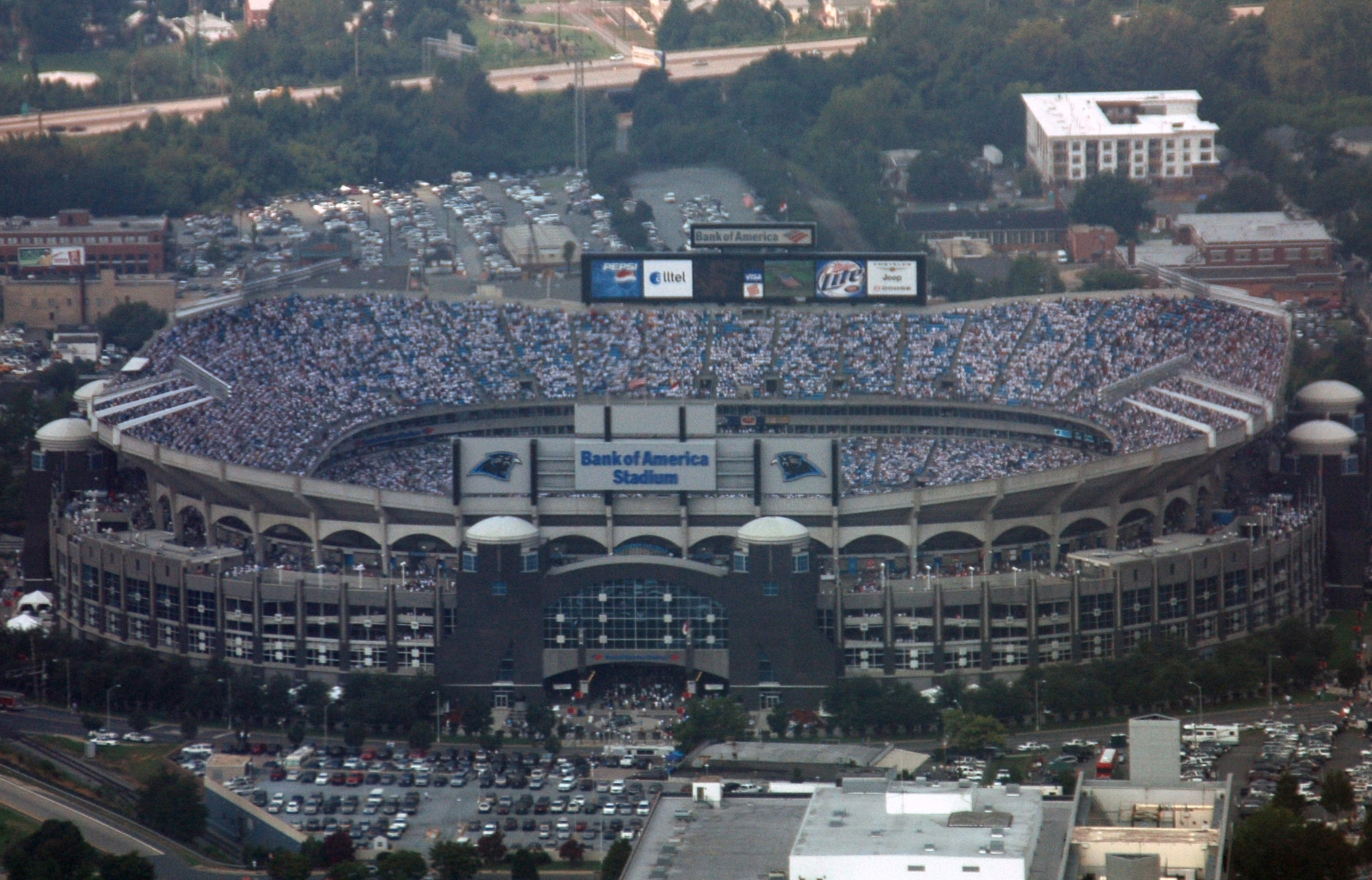
Bank of America Stadium in Charlotte, North Carolina will host the 2011 ACC Championship Game

The 2011 ACC Championship Game was the seventh football championship game for the Atlantic Coast Conference. It featured the winners of the ACCs two divisions, the Atlantic Division and the Coastal Division. Clemson represented the Atlantic while the Coastal division was represented by Virginia Tech. This was the game's second year at Bank of America Stadium in Charlotte, North Carolina. It was Clemson's second appearance, and Virginia Tech's fifth, in the ACC Championship Game. Clemson defeated Virginia Tech by a score of 38–10, earning a spot in the 2012 Orange Bowl. Clemson quarterback Tajh Boyd was named the game's most valuable player, after completing 20–29 passes for 240 yards and three touchdowns. He also ran for a touchdown.

Virginia Tech went on to play in the 2012 Sugar Bowl, where they were defeated 23–20 by Michigan.
