= 2011 Music City Bowl =

2011 Franklin American Mortgage Music City Bowl
- 14th Music City Bowl
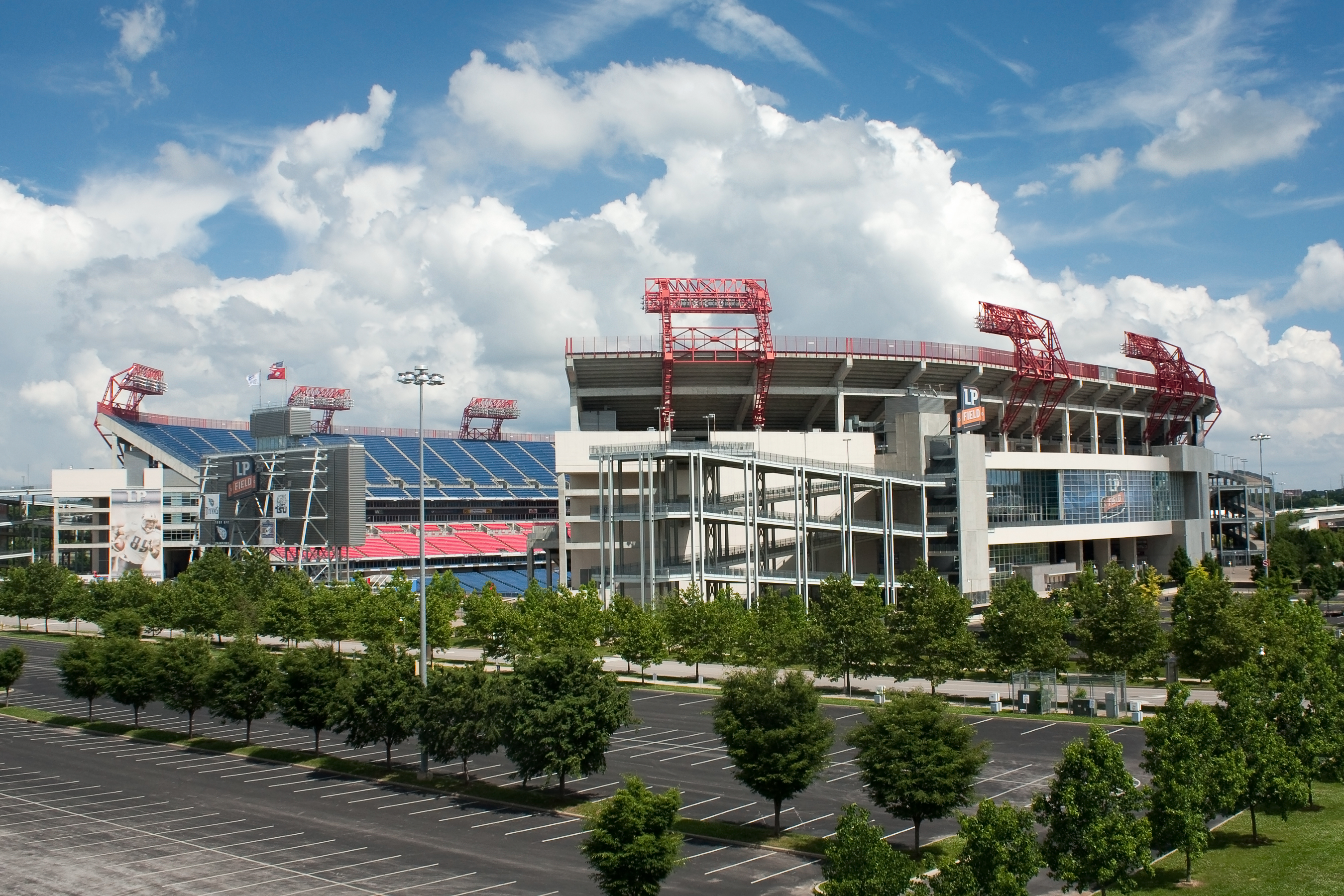
- LP Field in Nashville, Tennessee, hosted the Music City Bowl.
Mississippi State Bulldogs	Wake Forest Demon Deacons
(6–6)	(6–6)
SEC	ACC
23	17
Head coach: Dan Mullen	Head coach: Jim Grobe
	1	2	3	4	Total
Mississippi State	7	9	0	7	23
Wake Forest	7	0	7	3	17
- Date: December 30, 2011
- Season: 2011
- Stadium: LP Field
- Location: Nashville, Tennessee
- MVP: Vick Ballard (RB, Mississippi State)
- Favorite: Mississippi State by 6
- Referee: Don Willard (MAC)
- Attendance: 55,208
- Payout: US$1.7 million per team

United States TV coverage
- Network: ESPN
- Announcers: Mark Jones (Play-by-Play); Ed Cunningham (Analyst); Samantha Ponder (Sidelines)
- Nielsen ratings: 2.66

The 2011 Franklin American Mortgage Music City Bowl, the 14th edition of the game, was a post-season American college football bowl game, held on December 30, 2011, at LP Field in Nashville, Tennessee as part of the 2011–12 NCAA Bowl season.

The game, which began telecast at 6:40 p.m. ET on ESPN, featured the Mississippi State Bulldogs from the Southeastern Conference versus the Wake Forest Demon Deacons from the Atlantic Coast Conference. Mississippi State won, 23–17, securing its fifth bowl win in a row and its second in two seasons.

Scoring summary

Quarter	Time	Drive			Team	Scoring information	Score	
Quarter	Time	Plays	Yards	TOP	Team	Scoring information	MSU	Wake Forest
1	4:24	6	38	2:11	Wake	Brandon Pendergrass 14-yard touchdown run, Jimmy Newman kick good	0	7
1	3:04	3	67	1:20	MSU	Vick Ballard 60-yard touchdown run, Derek DePasquale kick good	7	7
2	12:41	2	58	0:24	MSU	Arceto Clark 31-yard touchdown reception from Chris Relf, Derek DePasquale kick missed	13	7
2	5:41	12	55	4:48	MSU	33-yard field goal by Derek DePasquale	16	7
3	11:00	7	64	4:00	Wake	Tommy Bohanon 1-yard touchdown run, Jimmy Newman kick good	16	14
4	12:53	3	82	1:19	MSU	Vick Ballard 72-yard touchdown run, Derek DePasquale kick good	23	14
4	3:27	13	55	3:29	Wake	46-yard field goal by Jimmy Newman	23	17
"TOP" = time of possession. For other American football terms, see Glossary of American football.							23	17

== See also ==
- 2026 Duke's Mayo Bowl, the next meeting of Wake Forest and Mississippi State
