= 2011 Georgia Tech Yellow Jackets football team =

American college football season

2011 Georgia Tech Yellow Jackets football

Sun Bowl vs Utah, L 27–30 ^{OT}
- Conference: Atlantic Coast Conference
- Coastal Division
- Record: 8–5 (5–3 ACC)
- Head coach: Paul Johnson (4th season)
- Offensive scheme: Flexbone triple option
- Defensive coordinator: Al Groh (2nd season)
- Base defense: 3–4
- Home stadium: Bobby Dodd Stadium

2011 Atlantic Coast Conference football standings
	Conf.			Overall
Team	W		L	W		L
Atlantic Division
No. 22 Clemson x$	6	–	2	10	–	4
Wake Forest	5	–	3	6	–	7
No. 23 Florida State	5	–	3	9	–	4
NC State	4	–	4	8	–	5
Boston College	3	–	5	4	–	8
Maryland	1	–	7	2	–	10
Coastal Division
No. 21 Virginia Tech x%	7	–	1	11	–	3
Virginia	5	–	3	8	–	5
Georgia Tech	5	–	3	8	–	5
Miami (FL)	3	–	5	6	–	6
North Carolina	3	–	5	7	–	6
Duke	1	–	7	3	–	9
Championship: Clemson 38, Virginia Tech 10
$ – BCS representative as conference champion; % – BCS at-large representative; x – Division champion/co-champions; Rankings from AP Poll

The 2011 Georgia Tech Yellow Jackets football team represented the Georgia Institute of Technology in the 2011 NCAA Division I FBS football season. The Yellow Jackets were led by fourth year head coach Paul Johnson and played their home games at Bobby Dodd Stadium. They are members of the Coastal Division of the Atlantic Coast Conference. They finished the season 8–5, 5–3 in ACC play to finish in a tie for second place in the Coastal Division. They were invited to the Sun Bowl where they were defeated by Utah 27–30 in overtime.

== Schedule ==
Date	Time	Opponent	Rank	Site	TV	Result	Attendance
September 1	7:30 pm	Western Carolina*		Bobby Dodd Stadium; Atlanta, GA	ESPN3	W 63–21	42,132
September 10	6:00 pm	at Middle Tennessee*		Johnny "Red" Floyd Stadium; Murfreesboro, TN	ESPN3	W 49–21	30,501
September 17	12:30 pm	Kansas*		Bobby Dodd Stadium; Atlanta, GA	FSN	W 66–24	42,025
September 24	12:00 pm	North Carolina	No. 24	Bobby Dodd Stadium; Atlanta, GA	ESPN	W 35–28	46,849
October 1	3:30 pm	at NC State	No. 21	Carter–Finley Stadium; Raleigh, NC	ABC/ESPN	W 45–35	55,811
October 8	12:00 pm	Maryland	No. 13	Bobby Dodd Stadium; Atlanta, GA	ESPNU	W 21–16	45,905
October 15	3:30 pm	at Virginia	No. 12	Scott Stadium; Charlottesville, VA	ESPNU	L 21–24	47,692
October 22	3:30 pm	at Miami (FL)	No. 20	Sun Life Stadium; Miami Gardens, FL	ESPN	L 7–24	43,716
October 29	8:00 pm	No. 6 Clemson^{†}		Bobby Dodd Stadium; Atlanta, GA (rivalry)	ABC	W 31–17	55,646
November 10	8:00 pm	No. 10 Virginia Tech	No. 20	Bobby Dodd Stadium; Atlanta, GA (Battle of the Techs)	ESPN	L 26–37	50,140
November 19	12:30 pm	at Duke		Wallace Wade Stadium; Durham, NC	ACCN	W 38–31	18,747
November 26	12:00 pm	No. 13 Georgia*	No. 25	Bobby Dodd Stadium; Atlanta, GA (Clean, Old-Fashioned Hate)	ESPN	L 17–31	54,925
December 31	2:00 pm	vs. Utah*		Sun Bowl Stadium; El Paso, TX (Sun Bowl)	CBS	L 27–30 ^{OT}	48,123
*Non-conference game; ^{†}Homecoming; Rankings from AP Poll released prior to the game; All times are in Eastern time

== Rankings ==
Ranking movements Legend: ██ Increase in ranking ██ Decrease in ranking — = Not ranked RV = Received votes
	Week															
Poll	Pre	1	2	3	4	5	6	7	8	9	10	11	12	13	14	Final
AP	—	RV	RV	25	21	13	12	20	RV	22	20	RV	25	RV	RV	
Coaches	RV	RV	RV	24	21	13	12	19	RV	23	19	23	21	RV	RV	
Harris	—	RV	RV	RV	RV	RV	12	18	RV	21	19	24	22	RV	RV	Not released
BCS	—	—	—	—	—	—	—	22	—	23	21	—	23	—	—	Not released

== Game summaries ==
=== Clemson ===
Team	1	2	3	4	Total
Clemson	3	0	7	7	17
• Georgia Tech	7	17	7	0	31

- Date: October 29
- Location: Bobby Dodd Stadium, Atlanta, GA
- Game start: 8:00 p.m. EST
- TV announcers (ESPN): Mike Patrick, Craig James, and Jenn Brown

Scoring summary
1	8:45	CLEM	Chandler Catanzaro 34-yard field goal	CLEM 3-0
1	2:59	GT	Orwin Smith 1-yard run (Justin Moore kick)	GT 7-3
2	12:01	GT	Justin Moore 23-yard field goal	GT 10-3
2	5:44	GT	Orwin Smith 3-yard run (Justin Moore kick)	GT 17-3
2	0:37	GT	Tevin Washington 3-yard run (Justin Moore kick)	GT 24-3
3	13:34	CLEM	Sammy Watkins 48-yard pass from Tajh Boyd (Chandler Catanzaro kick)	GT 24-10
3	11:30	GT	David Sims 11-yard run (Justin Moore kick)	GT 31-10
4	14:47	CLEM	Brandon Thomas recovered fumble in end zone (Chandler Catanzaro kick)	GT 31-17
