= 2012 Sugar Bowl =

2012 Allstate Sugar Bowl
- BCS Bowl Game; 78th Sugar Bowl
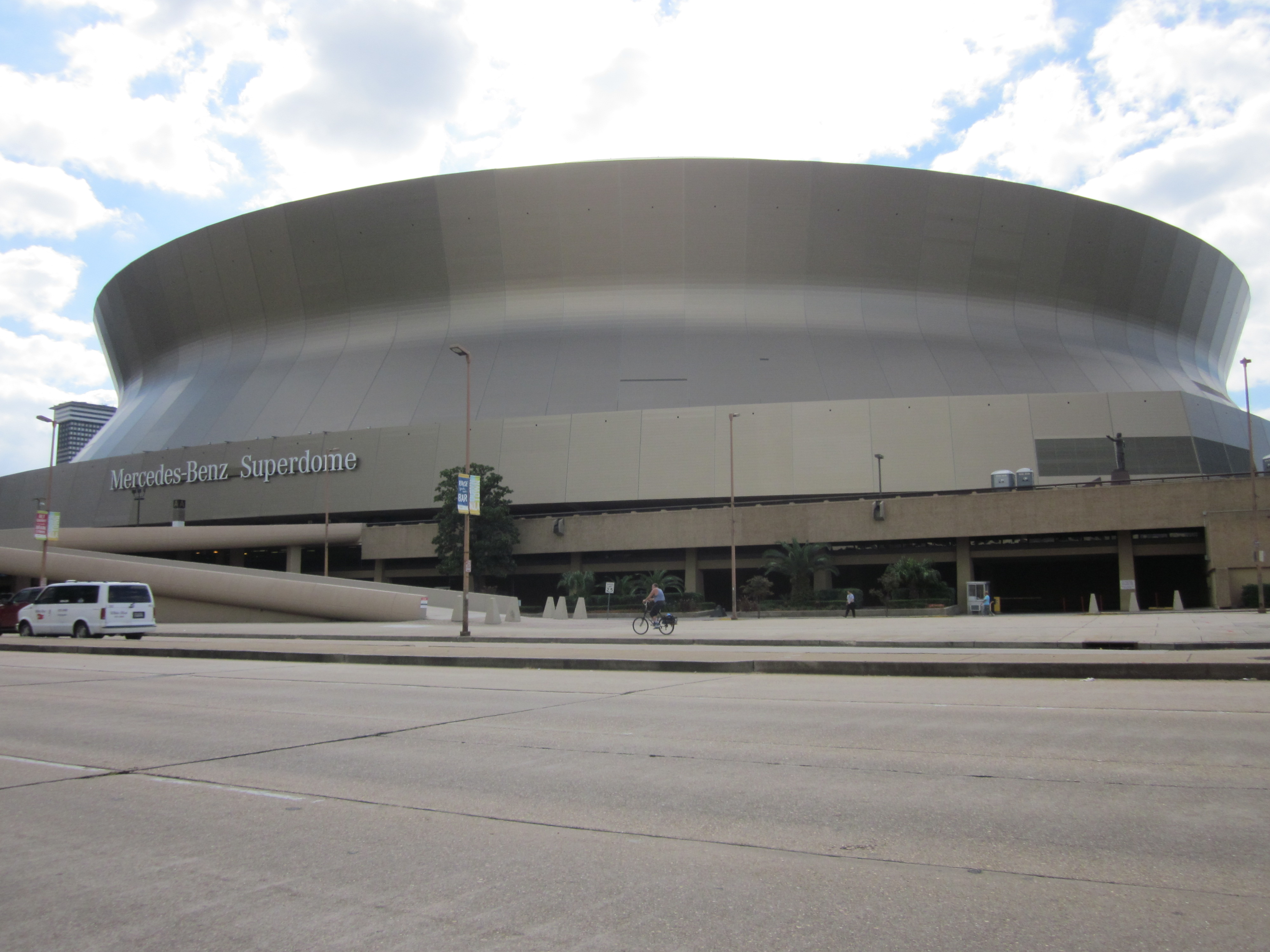
- The Mercedes-Benz Superdome in New Orleans, Louisiana, hosted the Sugar Bowl.
Michigan Wolverines	Virginia Tech Hokies
(10–2)	(11–2)
Big Ten	ACC
23	20
Head coach: Brady Hoke	Head coach: Frank Beamer
AP / Coaches / BCS; 13 / 12 / 13	AP / Coaches / BCS; 17 / 11 / 11
	1	2	3	4	OT	Total
Michigan	0	10	7	3	3	23
Virginia Tech	3	3	3	11	0	20
- Date: January 3, 2012
- Season: 2011
- Stadium: Mercedes-Benz Superdome
- Location: New Orleans, Louisiana
- MVP: WR Junior Hemingway, Michigan
- Favorite: Michigan by 1½
- Referee: Jay Stricherz (Pac-12)
- Attendance: 64,512
- Payout: US$17,000,000 per team

United States TV coverage
- Network: ESPN
- Announcers: Brad Nessler (Play-by-Play); Todd Blackledge (Analyst); Holly Rowe (Sideline); Tom Rinaldi (Sideline)
- Nielsen ratings: 6.07

The 2012 Allstate Sugar Bowl was the 78th edition of the annual postseason college football bowl game known as the Sugar Bowl. It featured the Michigan Wolverines and the Virginia Tech Hokies on Tuesday, January 3, 2012, at the Mercedes-Benz Superdome in New Orleans, Louisiana. The game was the final contest of the 2011 football season for both teams and was the third game of the 2011–2012 Bowl Championship Series (BCS). The game ended with 23–20 Michigan victory in overtime. Michigan represented the Big Ten Conference (Big Ten) as the at-large team from the conference, while Virginia Tech represented the Atlantic Coast Conference (ACC) as its at-large team. The game was televised in the United States on ESPN and an estimated 9.6 million viewers watched the broadcast live. This was the first Sugar Bowl since 2000, as well as only the sixth since World War II and the tenth overall, not to feature a Southeastern Conference (SEC) team (the 2000 Sugar Bowl, coincidentally, also featured Virginia Tech). This was because the top two SEC teams, the LSU Tigers and Alabama Crimson Tide, played each other in the 2012 BCS National Championship Game, also held at the Superdome. This was the last SEC-less Sugar Bowl until January 2021, when the Ohio State Buckeyes (representing the Big Ten) faced off against the Clemson Tigers (representing the ACC).

Michigan was offered a berth after it finished the season with a 10–2 record—its highest win total since the 2006 season—that ended with a 40–34 win against arch-rival Ohio State. Virginia Tech was offered a berth after it finished its season 11–2, which culminated in a 38–10 loss in the 2011 ACC Championship Game to Clemson. Media attention focused on the quality of the bowl selection, as both teams were criticized for not having strong schedules. Attention also focused on how Virginia Tech's defense would contain Michigan QB Denard Robinson.

The game kicked off at 8:32 pm Eastern Standard Time, and Virginia Tech scored first, converting its first possession into on a field goal. Virginia Tech added another field goal in the second quarter, but Michigan scored a touchdown in the final minute to take a 7–6 lead, and then recovered a Virginia Tech fumble on the ensuing kickoff. Michigan kicked a field goal as time expired in the first half to take a 10–6 lead. Michigan converted its first possession of the second half into a touchdown to take a 17–6 lead, but Virginia Tech added a field goal to narrow the lead to 17–9. In the fourth quarter, Virginia Tech scored a touchdown to narrow Michigan's lead to two points, and then converted a two-point conversion to tie the game. Michigan responded with a field goal, but Virginia Tech tied the game with a field goal with two seconds remaining. In overtime, Virginia Tech appeared to score the go-ahead touchdown, but the call on the field was overturned upon video review. On the next play, Virginia Tech missed a crucial field goal. Michigan converted its field goal opportunity to win the game 23–20 in overtime.

In recognition of his performance, Michigan's Junior Hemingway was named the game's most valuable player.

== Team selection ==
In the 2011 college football season, the SEC champion had an auto-bid to the Sugar Bowl. However, the SEC champion, the LSU Tigers, were ranked No. 1 in the BCS standings and were selected to play in the BCS Championship Game. The second place SEC team, the Alabama Crimson Tide, was also selected to the BCS title game, so the Sugar Bowl Committee was forced to turn to other conferences to select two teams. After bypassing teams such as Stanford, Kansas State and Boise State, the committee selected the Michigan Wolverines and the Virginia Tech Hokies.

=== Michigan ===
Michigan replaced its head coach prior to the season, with Rich Rodriguez being fired and Brady Hoke replacing him. Michigan began its 2011 college football season against Western Michigan and won 34–10 in a game that lasted a little under three quarters, as numerous thunderstorms first delayed and then ultimately postponed the game. In spite of the game ending early, Michigan was awarded the win. Michigan hosted Notre Dame in its next game, which was the first night game in Michigan Stadium history. After Notre Dame built its lead to 17 points—24–7 after the third quarter—Michigan came back to take the lead 28–24 with only 1:02 to go in the game. Notre Dame scored with 30 seconds remaining to take a 31–28 lead, but Michigan drove 80 yards in 28 seconds to score the game-winning touchdown and win the game 35–31. Michigan ended its non-conference schedule with comfortable wins against both Eastern Michigan (31–3) and San Diego State (28-7).

Michigan began its conference schedule against Minnesota in the battle for the Little Brown Jug. Michigan recorded its first shutout since 2007 with a 58–0 victory. Michigan then traveled to Evanston, Illinois, for its first road game of the season to face Northwestern. Michigan scored 28 unanswered points in the second half, coming back from a ten-point deficit at halftime to win 42–24. Michigan followed its trip to Evanston with a trip to East Lansing, Michigan to face its in-state rival Michigan State. Michigan suffered its first defeat of the season, losing 28–14, its fourth straight loss to Michigan State.

Following a bye week, Michigan returned home to face Purdue in its homecoming game. Michigan handily defeated Purdue, 36–14. Michigan then traveled to Iowa City, Iowa to face Iowa. Michigan suffered its second and final defeat of the season, losing 24–16. Michigan then traveled to Champaign, Illinois, for its final road game to face Illinois. Michigan won 31–14, with the defense performing in a matter that made Greg Mattison, Michigan's defensive coordinator, emotional as he told reporters: "That was a Michigan defense. ... Nobody knows what went on inside of these guys and for them to stick together and to play like they played tonight, and like they have tried in every game, it says a lot about them." Michigan returned home to face Nebraska and once again dominated its opponent, winning 45–17. In the final game of its regular season, Michigan faced Ohio State in the game known simply as "The Game." Michigan snapped its seven-game losing streak against Ohio State, winning 40–34.

The 2011 Wolverines, the first team to win eight home games in Michigan Stadium in a season, led the Big Ten Conference in rushing defense (115.6 yards per game) and opponent third-down percentage (30.1%, 31 of 103). The Wolverines featured consensus All-American and Rimington Trophy Winner David Molk and two 1,000-yard rushers, (Fitzgerald Toussaint and Denard Robinson). Robinson led the Big Ten Conference in total offense/game and wide receiver Junior Hemingway led the conference in yards per reception.

=== Controversy ===
Almost immediately following the team selection, controversy arose regarding the two teams selected. Michigan State QB Kirk Cousins, whose team failed to qualify for a BCS game because it did not finish in the top 14 of the BCS standings, criticized the potential selection of Michigan after his team's debilitating 42–39 loss to Wisconsin in the Big Ten Championship Game, "I don't see how you get punished for playing and someone else gets to sit on the couch and get what they want". Michigan State had defeated the University of Michigan 28–14 in East Lansing earlier that season. Others criticized the selection of Virginia Tech, stating that both Kansas State and Boise State were more deserving of the bid and that the bowl committee had chosen a familiar team as opposed to a new one. The bowl was considered the lowest-ranked match-up of two teams in the history of the BCS.

== Game summary ==
The game kicked off at 8:32 pm Eastern Standard Time (EST) in the Mercedes-Benz Superdome in New Orleans, Louisiana. Official attendance was listed at 64,512.

=== First quarter ===
Following the coin toss, Virginia Tech elected to defer to the second half. Michigan elected to receive, which ensured that Virginia Tech would start the second half on offense. Justin Myer kicked off for the Hokies and Michael Cox returned the kick to Michigan's 34-yard line. Michigan began the game missing starting C David Molk, who suffered a foot injury during the pre-game warmup. Michigan went three and out on its first drive that featured two fumbled snaps by Denard Robinson, Michigan was forced to punt. Tech received the ball at its own 37-yard line. Logan Thomas completed his first pass to Danny Coale and then completed another pass, this time to Jarret Boykins for 14 yards and a first down. Following a David Wilson run for loss of four yards, Thomas completed an 18-yard pass to D.J. Coles. Wilson then had two consecutive carries for eight yards and one-yard respectively. Following a Thomas three-yard run, Wilson ran for 11 yards to the Michigan four-yard line. On the next play Wilson rushed for a loss of 22 yards. Tech was forced to settle for a 37-yard field goal after it committed a delay of game penalty on second down, and after attempts on second and third down did not succeed.

On the post-field goal kickoff, Martavious Odoms returned the ball 16 yards to the Michigan 16-yard line; however, Michigan committed a holding penalty on the play and was forced to start on its own eight-yard line. Michigan's second drive was more successful than the first, with Denard Robinson completing an 11-yard pass to Kelvin Grady on third down, and Fitzgerald Toussaint rushing for 14 yards on the next play. The drive ended, however, following the Toussaint run as Robinson threw a pass that Kyle Fuller intercepted at Tech's 28-yard line. Tech then embarked on another long drive, with Thomas rushing for 11 yards on second down and finding Boykin for ten yards after a 15-yard illegal block penalty. After a false start penalty made it third-and-ten, Thomas completed a 27-yard pass to Coale. Following a three-yard loss on a Thomas run and an incomplete pass, Tech again converted on third-and-long, this time with on a 13-yard Thomas to Coles pass. Following two short rushes, the time ran out in the first quarter.

=== Second quarter ===
Virginia Tech continued its drive at the Michigan 31-yard line. Logan Thomas rushed for five yards, which set up a Justin Myer 43-yard field goal and gave Tech a 6–0 lead. On the ensuing kickoff, Myer kicked the ball out of bounds, which, by rule, gave Michigan the ball at its own 40-yard line. Michigan obtained some success on its drive, with Denard Robinson rushing for three yards, completing a three-yard pass to Jeremy Gallon, and then completing an eight-yard pass to Kevin Koger for a first down. The drive, however, stalled as Robinson was sacked and then threw two incompletions. Michigan was forced to punt and Tech received the ball at its own 26-yard line.

Following two short running plays, Thomas threw a 16-yard pass to Coale for a first down. On the ensuing play, David Wilson ran 32 yards for a first down to Michigan's 24-yard line. Josh Ogelsby followed Wilson's run with an 11-yard run of his own. Ogelsby then rushed for five yards and one-yard respectively. Thomas followed these plays with a three-yard rush, setting up a fourth-and-one at the Michigan 4-yard line. Instead of kicking the field goal that would have given Tech a 9–0 lead, Frank Beamer decided to go for the first down. Thomas was stopped for no gain and Tech turned the ball over on downs.

Following the turnover, Michigan started on its own four-yard line. Fitzgerald Toussaint ran for six yards, and Robinson followed with a 16-yard run. Michigan's offense stalled on its next three plays forcing a punt. On the punt, however, Tech committed a roughing the kicker penalty that gave Michigan 15 yards and an automatic first down. Toussaint ran the ball for a two-yard gain, and Michigan called a timeout. Following the timeout, Robinson rushed for five yards and then completed a 14-yard pass to Toussaint for a first down at the Tech 38-yard line. Robinson was sacked on the next play for a loss of seven yards and then threw an incompletion to make it third-and-seventeen. On the next play, however, Robinson threw a 45-yard touchdown pass to Junior Hemingway that saw Hemingway reach around a Tech defender to make the original catch, and then sprint into the endzone. Brendan Gibbons added the extra point to give Michigan a 7–6 lead. On the ensuing kickoff, Tech's Tony Gregory returned the ball 27 yards, however, Michigan's J.B. Fitzgerald forced a fumble that Michigan's Delonte Hollowell recovered at Tech's 26-yard line. Gallon rushed for seven yards on the first play before Robinson threw two incomplete passes. Michigan brought out Gibbons to attempt a field goal, however, Michigan attempted a fake field goal that saw Michigan's long snapper Jareth Glanda make a catch for 11 yards after the ball hit a Virginia Tech defender in the head. With eight seconds remaining in the half, Robinson threw a seven-yard screen pass to Vincent Smith, which moved the ball to the Tech one-yard line. With two seconds remaining on the clock, Michigan elected to again send out its field goal unit. Michigan intentionally took a delay of game penalty to move the ball back in order for Gibbons to have a better angle to kick the field goal. Gibbons converted the 24-yard field goal as time expired, giving Michigan a 10–6 lead at halftime.

=== Halftime ===
The halftime show consisted of 11 high school bands along with dance troupes performing a jazz theme halftime show in connection with New Orleans' history with jazz. The bands performed Harry Connick Jr.'s "Save the Last Dance for Me", Michael Bublé's "Haven't Met You Yet", and Frank Sinatra's "Fly Me to the Moon".

=== Third quarter ===
Since Virginia Tech deferred its option to the second half, it received the half's opening kickoff. Jayron Hosley returned the kick to Tech's 30-yard line. Tech opened its drive with a five-yard Thomas to Coale pass and followed that play with a Wilson two-yard rush. After a Michigan timeout, Thomas rushed for one-yard and was stopped short of a first down in the process. Tech was forced to punt for this first time in the game. Coale—who was also Tech's punter in addition to receiver—punted the ball 36 yards to the Michigan 26-yard line. Michigan's drive also saw little success. Following a Toussaint one-yard run, Robinson threw an incomplete pass intended for Roy Roundtree and Antone Exum sacked Robinson for a loss of 11 yards. Wile punted the ball 40 yards to the Tech 49-yard line.

Tech's first play on the following drive was its only play, as Frank Clark made a leaping block on a Thomas pass and then retained possession for an interception. Following a Tech timeout, Vincent Smith rushed for two yards. On the next play, Hosley committed a defensive pass interference penalty, giving Michigan a 15-yard advancement and an automatic first down at the Tech 18-yard line. Toussaint rushed for no gain, but on the next play, Robinson threw an 18-yard touchdown pass to Hemingway, his second touchdown reception of the night. Gibbons converted the extra point, giving Michigan a 17–6 lead.

Tech returned the ensuing kickoff to its own 42-yard line. Wilson carried the ball for the first three plays, gaining eleven, four, and six yards respectively. Thomas then threw a 3-yard pass to Wilson, and on the next play, Clark committed an offside penalty, making it second-and-two on the Michigan 31-yard line. Oglesby rushed two yards for a first down, and then Wilson ran the next two plays for five and two yards respectively. Thomas then completed a two-yard pass to Joey Phillips, but Phillips was stopped short of a first down, forcing Tech to kick a 36-yard field goal. Myer converted the kick, cutting Michigan's lead to eight points. Odoms returned the kickoff for Michigan to the Michigan 23-yard line, but the Wolverines had little success on its drive. After a Toussaint run for five yards, Toussaint gained zero yards on his next run and Robinson's pass to Hemingway was incomplete. Michigan was forced to punt and Tech received the ball at its own 39-yard line. Jake Ryan sacked Thomas for a loss of three yards on Tech's first play, and Thomas completed a pass for a gain of one-yard to Boykin on the next play; however, Thomas converted a third-and-twelve into a first down with a 13-yard run. After Wilson and Oglesby both had one-yard runs, the third quarter ended.

=== Fourth quarter ===
Tech resumed its drive on the Michigan 48-yard line. On its first play, Oglesby ran the ball for 18 yards and a Tech first down. Tech's next three plays saw Thomas throw two incomplete passes interspersed with a Ryan Van Bergen sack for a one-yard loss. Beamer elected to go for it on fourth down and Thomas converted, gaining 13 yards on 4th-and-11. Wilson ran the ball for a two-yard gain on first down, and then carried the ball for another 12 yards on second down. After an incomplete pass, Thomas rushed for a one-yard loss making it 3-and-11. Blake Countess committed a pass interference penalty which advanced the ball seven yards and gave Tech a first down. After a Wilson one-yard run, Thomas rushed for a one-yard gain and a Tech touchdown. Since Michigan led by two, Tech elected to attempt a two-point conversion and converted on a Thomas to Marcus Davis pass, which tied the game.

Odoms returned the kickoff to the Michigan 22-yard line. Michigan's offense stalled, as after a Robinson one-yard run, his next two passes to Hemingway and Drew Dileo were incomplete. Michigan was forced to punt, and Tech received the ball on its own 43-yard line. Thomas completed a five-yard pass to Eric Martin on Tech's first play, but Michigan's defense held Wilson to a run for no gain on second down. Thomas ran for four yards on third down, which forced Tech to punt on fourth-and-one. Tech elected to attempt a fake punt, but Coale's attempt to run for the first down was stopped. He then attempted to punt the ball away before he was tackled, but the kick was blocked and Michigan recovered on the Tech 45-yard line. After a Toussaint run for no gain, Robinson completed a pass to Roundtree for a 10-yard gain. After another incomplete pass, Robinson rushed for an 11-yard gain. Michigan's offense then stalled, as Tech stopped Toussaint for no gain, held Robinson to a two-yard run, and then forced an incomplete pass intended for Kevin Koger. Gibbons kicked a 39-yard field goal, giving Michigan a 20–17 lead.

Tech returned the kickoff to its own 17-yard line, but a holding penalty forced Tech to start on its own nine-yard line. Wilson begane the drive with an eight-yard run. Thomas advanced the ball 41 yards in two plays, with an 11-yard pass to Davis and a 30-yard pass to Coale. After a Wilson one-yard run, Thomas completed a 12-yard pass to Coale, giving Tech a first down at the Michigan 31-yard line. Following an incomplete pass intended for Davis, Thomas completed a 15-yard pass to Chris Drager. Wilson rushed for no gain, but Thomas completed an eight-yard pass to Coale, giving Tech a third-and-two on the Michigan eight-yard line. Tech committed a false start penalty, making it third-and-seven from the 13-yard line. Thomas completed an eight-yard pass to Boykin, but settled for the tying 25-yard field goal from Myer after a timeout from each team. The game went to overtime with the score tied at 20.

=== Overtime ===
With the game tied, both teams returned to the field for an overtime coin toss. Michigan won the toss and elected to play defense first. Tech began its overtime drive with the ball on the Michigan 25-yard line. Wilson carried the ball two straight times, gaining two yards and three yards respectively. On third down, Thomas threw a pass into the endzone to Coale. The play was originally ruled a touchdown, but was overturned after a lengthy video review. Myer then lined up for a 37-yard field goal, but pushed it to the right, giving Michigan the ball and the opportunity to win the game with a field goal.

Michigan played conservatively on its drive, beginning on Tech's 25-yard line. Michigan handed the ball to Toussaint three straight times, which saw runs of three, two, and zero yards respectively. After a Tech timeout in an attempt to ice the kicker, Gibbons kicked a 37-yard field goal to give Michigan the victory and its first BCS win since the 2000 Orange Bowl.

== Final statistics ==
Statistical comparison
	MICH	VT
1st downs	12	22
Total yards	184	377
Passing yards	128	214
Rushing yards	56	163
Penalties	4–26	7–68
3rd down conversions	4–13	6–15
4th down conversions	1–1	1–3
Turnovers	1	2
Time of Possession	23:10	36:50

Junior Hemingway caught both Michigan touchdowns, earning 2012 Sugar Bowl Most Outstanding Player honors.

Virginia Tech statistically dominated Michigan on offense, out-gaining the Wolverines 377–184. This was also reflected in the number of first downs gained. Virginia Tech earned 22 first downs: twelve rushing, nine passing, and one via penalty. Michigan, meanwhile, earned 12 first downs: three rushing, seven passing, and two via penalty. Michigan possessed the ball 11 times during the game. Five of their possessions ended with punts, one with an interception, two with touchdowns, and three with field goals. Michigan's longest drive lasted 11 plays and covered a distance of 96 yards, ending with a touchdown. Virginia Tech also possessed the ball 11 times during the game. Virginia Tech only punted the ball one time, but lost possession of the ball once via a fumble, once via an interception, and twice on downs. Virginia Tech kicked four field goals and had one touchdown, but also missed one field goal which led to Michigan's victory. Virginia Tech's longest drive lasted 11 plays and covered a distance of 83 yards, leading to the game-tying field goal at the end of the fourth quarter, which sent the game to overtime.

Over two-thirds of Michigan's offense came through the air, as Michigan racked up 128 net passing yards. Virginia Tech gained a little over half of its yards through the air, as it racked up 214 net passing yards. Both teams' strategies did little to ensure success on third down, as Michigan only converted four of its thirteen attempts, while Virginia Tech converted only six of its fifteen attempts. Michigan converted its only fourth down attempt, while Virginia Tech converted one out of its three attempts. Virginia Tech dominated the time of possession as well, controlling the ball 36:50 to Michigan's 23:10.

The game was ultimately decided via special teams and turnovers. Michigan only committed one turnover compared with Virginia Tech's two, with each team throwing an interception, and Michigan recovering a fumble. Michigan also committed two fumbles, but recovered both of them. Michigan converted both of Virginia Tech's turnovers into points, scoring three points on a field goal after recovering a fumble off of a Virginia Tech kick return, and scoring its second touchdown after Frank Clark intercepted a Logan Thomas pass. Justin Myer's missed field goal in overtime led to Michigan winning the game on its next drive with a field goal of its own.

=== Michigan statistical recap ===
Individual Leaders
Michigan Passing
	C/ATT^{*}	Yds	TD	INT
D. Robinson	9/21	117	2	1
D. Dileo	1/1	11	0	0
Michigan Rushing
	Car^{a}	Yds	TD	LG^{b}
F. Toussaint	13	30	0	14
D. Robinson	13	13	0	16
J. Gallon	1	7	0	7
M. Odoms	1	5	0	5
V. Smith	1	2	0	2
Michigan Receiving
	Rec^{c}	Yds	TD	LG^{b}
J. Hemingway	2	63	2	45
K. Koger	2	9	0	8
F. Toussaint	1	14	0	14
J. Glanda	1	11	0	11
K. Grady	1	11	0	11
R. Roundtree	1	10	0	10
V. Smith	1	7	0	7
J. Gallon	1	3	0	3

^{*} Completions/Attempts ^{a} Carries ^{b} Long play ^{c} Receptions

Despite winning the game, the Wolverines were relatively ineffective on offense. Denard Robinson only completed 9 of 21 passes for a total of 117 yards. He did, however, throw for two touchdowns, both of which were thrown to Junior Hemingway. His one interception ended a Michigan drive at Tech's 28-yard line in the first quarter, and was later converted into a Virginia Tech field goal in the second quarter. Drew Dileo's one pass came on a fake field goal attempt, which led to a field goal two plays later as time expired in the half.

Michigan utilized eight different receivers in its offense, but only two of them, Kevin Koger and Hemingway, had more than one reception. Hemingway had two receptions for 63 yards and two touchdowns, while Koger's receptions totaled only nine yards. The eighth receiver, long snapper Jareth Glanda, caught his pass as a result of a deflection on the fake field goal attempt. Glanda's 11-yard reception totaled the third highest receiving yards on the team, tied with Kelvin Grady. Hemingway's 45-yard touchdown reception in the second quarter was Michigan's longest play from scrimmage in the game.

The Wolverines were even more ineffective running the ball, gaining a total of 56 rushing yards. Fitzgerald Toussaint carried the ball 13 times for 30 yards, with his longest run coming on a 14-yard play in the first quarter. Denard Robinson also carried the ball 13 times, but he only gained 13 yards, with his longest play of 16 yards coming in the second quarter. Martavious Odoms and Vincent Smith each had one carry, for five and two yards respectively, with Odoms' carry coming on an end-around.

Jake Ryan had four tackles for a loss and a sack, for a total loss of 36 yards, while Jordan Kovacs led the Wolverines with eleven total tackles, six solo and five assisted. Desmond Morgan and Ryan also had six solo tackles, with Morgan recording one and a half tackles for a loss. Mike Martin and Ryan Van Bergen each recorded half a sack. Blake Countess and Courtney Avery each recorded half a tackle for a loss. Frank Clark had one interception, which led to Michigan's second touchdown of the game, and assisted on one tackle for a loss.

Brendan Gibbons converted all three of his field goal attempts, with distances of 24, 39, and 37 yards. Will Hagerup was ineffective as Michigan's punter, only averaging 25 yards per punt on two punts, which led to Matt Wile replacing Hagerup. Wile averaged 43.7 yards per punt, punting a total of three times. Wile also handled the team's kickoff duties, kicking off four times for a total of 256 yards, or an average kick of 64 yards per kickoff. Martavious Odoms and Michael Cox handled Michigan's kick return duties, with Odoms returning three kicks for a total of 51 yards, with a long of 21 yards. Michael Cox returned two kicks for a total of two yards, with a long of two yards. No Michigan player was able to return a punt during the game. Michigan's special teams did draw a roughing the kicker penalty that eventually led to Michigan's first touchdown of the game. Michigan also recovered one fumble in the second quarter, which led to a field goal at the end of the first half.

=== Virginia Tech statistical recap ===
Individual Leaders
Virginia Tech Passing
	C/ATT	Yds	TD	INT
L. Thomas	19/28	214	0	1
Virginia Tech Rushing
	Car	Yds	TD	LG
D. Wilson	24	82	1	32
L. Thomas	16	53	1	13
J. Oglesby	7	35	0	14
D. Coale	1	(-7)	0	0
Virginia Tech Receiving
	Rec	Yds	TD	LG
D. Coale	8	117	0	30
J. Boykin	4	30	0	14
DJ Coles	2	31	0	18
C. Drager	1	15	0	15
M. Davis	1	11	0	11
E. Martin	1	5	0	5
D. Wilson	1	3	0	3
J. Phillips	1	2	0	2

Virginia Tech was effective with its passing attack. Logan Thomas completed 19 of his 28 pass attempts for a total of 214 yards, completing one fourth down conversion and only throwing one interception. He was unable to throw for a passing touchdown. His interception in the third quarter, however, led to Michigan's second touchdown of the game.

Virginia Tech utilized eight different receivers, with Danny Coale leading the team in both receptions (8) and yards (117) with a long of 30 yards, but none of Virginia Tech's receivers were able to record a touchdown. Jarett Boykin recorded Virginia Tech's next highest number of receptions at four for a total of 30 yards, while DJ Coles recorded the next highest number of receiving yards with two receptions for 31 yards. Five other receivers each caught one pass, with Chris Drager recording the longest reception (15 yards) of those five players.

David Wilson led Virginia Tech's rushing attack, gaining a total of 82 rushing yards on 24 carries, and running for 32 yards in one play. Logan Thomas also was effective running the ball, gaining 53 yards on 16 attempts, for an average of 3.3 yards per carry. Both Wilson and Thomas each recorded a rushing touchdown in addition to their yardage totals. Coale's negative rushing yard total made him the only player from either team to have a negative total in rushing yards. He lost seven yards on his only rushing attempt—a fake punt in the fourth quarter—which gave Michigan the ball in Virginia Tech territory.

Tariq Edwards led Virginia Tech's defense with eight total tackles, six solo and two assisted. Two of these tackles were for a loss for a total of eight yards, with one of the two being a sack for a loss of seven yards. Corey Marshall also had one sack for a loss of four yards, while Justin Tyler and Antone Exum had a combined one sack for a loss of seven yards. JR Collins and Tyler each had a total of seven tackles. Collins' seven tackles consisted of five solo and two assisted, while Tyler's tackles consisted of three solo and four assisted. Seven total Virginia Tech players recorded either a solo or an assisted tackle for a loss. Eddie Whitley had five total tackles, three solo and two assisted, and recorded the most tackles for Virginia Tech without recording a tackle for a loss. Kyle Fuller recorded Virginia Tech's only interception, which was also Michigan's only turnover of the game.

Justin Myer converted four of his five field goal attempts, from 37, 43, 36, and 25 yards respectively. He missed his final attempt from 37 yards in overtime, which allowed Michigan to kick the game-winning field goal on its ensuing possession. Myer also handled the team's kickoff duties, kicking off six times for a total of 336 yards for an average of 56 yards per kickoff, with one of those kicks going out of bounds. Coale also acted as Virginia Tech's punter, punting one time for a total of 36 yards. Three Virginia Tech players returned kickoffs during the game. David Wilson returned two kickoffs for a total of 39 yards, with a long of 25 yards. Jayron Hosely returned one kick for a total of 29 yards. Tony Gregory returned one kick for 23 yards, but also was responsible for the fumble that led to Michigan's field goal at the end of the first half.

== Postgame effects ==
The game improved Michigan's record to 11–2, its first 11 win season since 2006, while Virginia Tech's record dropped to 11–3. With the victory, Michigan won the only BCS bowl in which it had not yet been victorious, improved its bowl record to 20–21, and improved its record against the ACC to 19–3. Michigan also moved to 2–0 in overtime in bowl games, with its previous victory being in the Orange Bowl against Alabama. The Superdome was reconfigured to host the Detroit Lions vs. New Orleans Saints National Football Conference (NFC) wild card game the following Saturday. The Superdome would then play host to the BCS National Championship game the following Monday.

=== 2012 NFL draft ===
As the final game of the season, the game gave Michigan and Virginia Tech players a chance to improve their draft stock before the 2012 NFL draft. Michigan had three players drafted, with Mike Martin being the first. He was drafted in the third round, 82nd overall by the Tennessee Titans. He was followed by David Molk (226th) and Hemingway (238th). Michigan players not drafted signed free agent contracts with other teams after the draft ended. Ryan Van Bergen subsequently signed with the Carolina Panthers, minutes after the draft ended on April 28. Later that day, Troy Woolfolk and Michael Shaw announced via Twitter through their agents that they had signed with the Dallas Cowboys and Washington Redskins, respectively.

Virginia Tech had three players drafted. David Wilson was the first Virginia Tech player selected. He was drafted in the first round, 32nd overall by the New York Giants. He was followed by Danny Coale and Jayron Hosley.

== Aftermath ==
On May 9, 2013, the two teams worked out an agreement to play a home-and-away in 2020 and 2021, but this series was later cancelled by Michigan. Michigan would have hosted Virginia Tech on September 19, 2020, at Michigan Stadium while Virginia Tech would have hosted Michigan on September 11, 2021, at Lane Stadium.
