= 2011 Boston College Eagles football team =

American college football season

2011 Boston College Eagles football
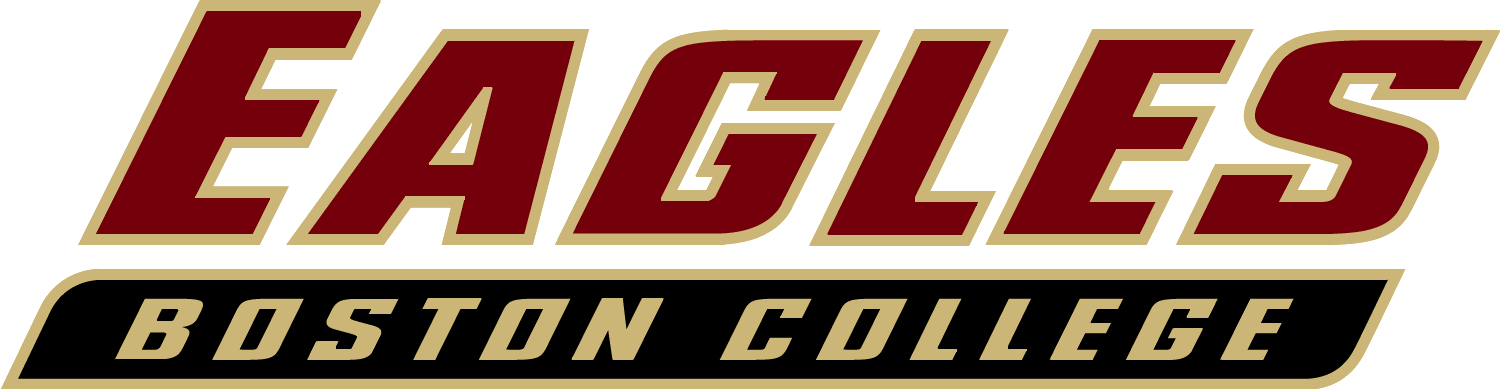
- Conference: Atlantic Coast Conference
- Atlantic Division
- Record: 4–8 (3–5 ACC)
- Head coach: Frank Spaziani (3rd season)
- Offensive coordinator: Kevin Rogers (1st season)
- Offensive scheme: Multiple
- Defensive coordinator: Bill McGovern (3rd season)
- Base defense: 4–3
- Captains: Donnie Fletcher; Luke Kuechly; Ifeanyi Momah; Nathan Richman
- Home stadium: Alumni Stadium

2011 Atlantic Coast Conference football standings
	Conf.			Overall
Team	W		L	W		L
Atlantic Division
No. 22 Clemson x$	6	–	2	10	–	4
Wake Forest	5	–	3	6	–	7
No. 23 Florida State	5	–	3	9	–	4
NC State	4	–	4	8	–	5
Boston College	3	–	5	4	–	8
Maryland	1	–	7	2	–	10
Coastal Division
No. 21 Virginia Tech x%	7	–	1	11	–	3
Virginia	5	–	3	8	–	5
Georgia Tech	5	–	3	8	–	5
Miami (FL)	3	–	5	6	–	6
North Carolina	3	–	5	7	–	6
Duke	1	–	7	3	–	9
Championship: Clemson 38, Virginia Tech 10
$ – BCS representative as conference champion; % – BCS at-large representative; x – Division champion/co-champions; Rankings from AP Poll

The 2011 Boston College Eagles football team represented Boston College as a member of the Atlantic Division of the Atlantic Coast Conference (ACC) in the 2011 NCAA Division I FBS football season. The Eagles were led by third-year head coach Frank Spaziani and played their home games at Alumni Stadium. They finished the season 4–8 overall and 3–5 in ACC play to place fifth in Atlantic Division.

== Schedule ==
Date	Time	Opponent	Site	TV	Result	Attendance	Source
September 3	12:00 p.m.	Northwestern*	Alumni Stadium; Chestnut Hill, MA	ESPNU	L 17–24	37,561	
September 10	8:00 p.m.	at UCF*	Bright House Networks Stadium; Orlando, FL	CBSSN	L 3–30	45,671	
September 17	12:30 p.m.	Duke	Alumni Stadium; Chestnut Hill, MA	ACCN	L 19–20	35,812	
September 24	1:00 p.m.	No. 17 (FCS) UMass*	Alumni Stadium; Chestnut Hill, MA (rivalry)	ESPN3	W 45–17	30,176	
October 1	12:30 p.m.	Wake Forest	Alumni Stadium; Chestnut Hill, MA	ACCN	L 19–27	38,265	
October 8	3:00 p.m.	at No. 8 Clemson	Memorial Stadium; Clemson, SC (O'Rourke–McFadden Trophy)	FSN	L 14–36	76,315	
October 22	3:00 p.m.	at Virginia Tech	Lane Stadium; Blacksburg, VA (rivalry)	FSN	L 14–30	66,233	
October 29	3:00 p.m.	at Maryland	Byrd Stadium; College Park, MD	FSN	W 28–17	29,945	
November 3	8:00 p.m.	Florida State	Alumni Stadium; Chestnut Hill, MA	ESPN	L 7–38	38,729	
November 12	12:30 p.m.	NC State	Alumni Stadium; Chestnut Hill, MA	ACCN	W 14–10	33,712	
November 19	4:00 p.m.	at No. 25 Notre Dame*	Notre Dame Stadium; Notre Dame, IN (Holy War)	NBC	L 14–16	80,795	
November 25	3:30 p.m.	at Miami (FL)	Sun Life Stadium; Miami Gardens, FL	ABC	W 24–17	44,954	
*Non-conference game; Rankings from Coaches Poll released prior to the game; All times are in Eastern time

== Roster ==
2011 Boston College Eagles football team roster
Players
Coaches
Offense

Pos.	#	Name	Class
WR	1	Colin Larmond, Jr.	Jr
RB	2	Montel Harris	Sr
WR	3	Ifeanyi Momah	Sr
QB	11	Chase Rettig	So
QB	16	Mike Marscovetra	Jr
QB	17	Dennis McCarthy	Jr
C	69	Mark Spinney	Sr
OT	70	Aaron Kramer	Fr
OT	72	Mike Goodman, Jr.	Jr
OT	73	John Wetzel	Jr
OL	74	Dave Bowen	Fr
G	75	Nathan Richman	Sr
OT	77	Emmett Cleary	Jr
OL	79	Paul Gaughan	Fr
TE	80	Brian Miller	Fr

Defense

Pos.	#	Name	Class
DB	5	Al Louis-Jean	Fr
DB	6	C. J. Jones	So
LB	34	Sean Duggan	Fr
LB	40	Luke Kuechly	Jr
DL	55	Kieran Borcich	Fr
DE	56	Max Holloway	Jr
DL	90	Connor Wujciak	Fr
DE	91	Kasim Edebali	So
DT	92	Dillon Quinn	Jr
DT	93	Bryan Murray	Jr
DL	95	Dominic Appiah	Fr
DT	96	Kaleb Ramsey	Sr
DT	97	Conor O'Neal	Jr
DL	98	Max Ricci	Fr
DL	99	Brian Mihalik	Fr

Special teams

Pos.	#	Name	Class
P	46	Ryan Quigley	Sr

Head coach

- Frank Spaziani

Coordinators/assistant coaches

- Bill McGovern (DC/LB)
- Kevin Rogers (OC
- Mike Dawson (ST/FB)
- Ryan Day (WR)
- Ben Sirmans (RB)
- Mike Siravo (DB/RC)
- Ben Johnson (TE)
- Sean Devine (OL)
- Jeff Comissiong (DL)

Legend

- (C) Team captain
- (S) Suspended
- (I) Ineligible
- Injured
- Redshirt

Roster

== 2012 NFL draft ==
2012	1	9	Luke Kuechly	Carolina Panthers	LB
