= 2011 Maryland Terrapins football team =

American college football season

2011 Maryland Terrapins football
- Conference: Atlantic Coast Conference
- Atlantic Division
- Record: 2–10 (1–7 ACC)
- Head coach: Randy Edsall (1st season)
- Offensive coordinator: Gary Crowton (1st season)
- Offensive scheme: Multiple
- Defensive coordinator: Todd Bradford (1st season)
- Base defense: 4–3
- Captains: Andrew Gonnella; Davin Meggett; Kenny Tate; Joe Vellano
- Home stadium: Byrd Stadium

2011 Atlantic Coast Conference football standings
	Conf.			Overall
Team	W		L	W		L
Atlantic Division
No. 22 Clemson x$	6	–	2	10	–	4
Wake Forest	5	–	3	6	–	7
No. 23 Florida State	5	–	3	9	–	4
NC State	4	–	4	8	–	5
Boston College	3	–	5	4	–	8
Maryland	1	–	7	2	–	10
Coastal Division
No. 21 Virginia Tech x%	7	–	1	11	–	3
Virginia	5	–	3	8	–	5
Georgia Tech	5	–	3	8	–	5
Miami (FL)	3	–	5	6	–	6
North Carolina	3	–	5	7	–	6
Duke	1	–	7	3	–	9
Championship: Clemson 38, Virginia Tech 10
$ – BCS representative as conference champion; % – BCS at-large representative; x – Division champion/co-champions; Rankings from AP Poll

The 2011 Maryland Terrapins football team represented the University of Maryland in the 2011 NCAA Division I FBS football season. It was the Terrapins' 59th season as a member of the Atlantic Coast Conference (ACC) and its seventh within the ACC's Atlantic Division.

After leading a significant turnaround in 2010 from the worst season in school history in 2009, Ralph Friedgen did not return for his 11th season as head coach. Maryland's out-of-conference schedule included a continuation of the long-standing rivalry with West Virginia and a neutral site game against Notre Dame at the Washington Commanders' stadium, FedExField in nearby Landover as well as a game against in-state FCS opponent Towson.

== Schedule ==
Date	Time	Opponent	Site	TV	Result	Attendance	Source
September 5	8:00 pm	Miami (FL)	Byrd Stadium; College Park, MD	ESPN	W 32–24	52,875	
September 17	12:00 pm	No. 18 West Virginia*	Byrd Stadium; College Park, MD (rivalry)	ESPNU	L 31–37	53,627	
September 24	12:30 pm	Temple*	Byrd Stadium; College Park, MD	ACCN	L 7–38	39,102	
October 1	3:30 pm	No. 23 (FCS) Towson*	Byrd Stadium; College Park, MD	ACCRSN	W 28–3	35,573	
October 8	12:00 pm	at No. 13 Georgia Tech	Bobby Dodd Stadium; Atlanta, GA	ESPNU	L 16–21	45,905	
October 15	7:00 pm	No. 8 Clemson^{†}	Byrd Stadium; College Park, MD	ESPNU	L 45–56	47,961	
October 22	3:30 pm	at Florida State	Doak Campbell Stadium; Tallahassee, FL	ABC/ESPN2	L 16–41	72,697	
October 29	3:00 pm	Boston College	Byrd Stadium; College Park, MD	ACCRSN	L 17–28	29,945	
November 5	12:30 pm	Virginia	Byrd Stadium; College Park, MD (rivalry)	ACCN	L 13–31	37,401	
November 12	7:30 pm	vs. Notre Dame*	FedExField; Landover, MD (Shamrock Series)	NBC	L 21–45	70,251	
November 19	3:00 pm	at Wake Forest	BB&T Field; Winston-Salem, NC	ACCRSN	L 10–31	30,112	
November 26	12:30 pm	at NC State	Carter–Finley Stadium; Raleigh, NC	ACCN	L 41–56	55,323	
*Non-conference game; ^{†}Homecoming; Rankings from AP Poll released prior to the game; All times are in Eastern time

== Coaching staff ==
Name	Position(s)	Year at Maryland	Alma mater	Sources
Randy Edsall	Head coach	1st	Syracuse (1980)	
Mike Locksley	Offensive coordinator / quarterbacks	6th (Note: Mike Locksley was previously an assistant coach at Maryland from 1997–2002. He rejoined the Maryland coaching staff in 2012.)	Towson (1992)	
Todd Bradford	Defensive coordinator / defensive backs	1st	Southern Utah (1986)	
Tom Brattan	Offensive line	11th	Delaware (1972)	
Greg Gattuso	Assistant Head Coach / defensive line	1st	Penn State (1983)	
Keith Dudzinski	Inside Linebackers	1st	New Haven (1991)	
John Dunn	Tight Ends / recruiting coordinator	1st	North Carolina (2005)	
Lee Hull	Wide receivers	4th	Holy Cross (1988)	
Lyndon Johnson	Outside Linebackers	1st	Connecticut (1992)	
Andre Powell	Special Teams Coordinator / running backs	1st	Indiana (1989)	
Drew Wilson	Director of strength and conditioning	1st	King's College (2000)	
Curome Cox	Graduate assistant	2nd	Maryland (2003)	
