= 2011 Miami Hurricanes football team =

American college football season

2011 Miami Hurricanes football
- Conference: Atlantic Coast Conference
- Coastal Division
- Record: 6–6 (3–5 ACC)
- Head coach: Al Golden (1st season)
- Offensive coordinator: Jedd Fisch (1st season)
- Offensive scheme: Pro-style
- Defensive coordinator: Mark D'Onofrio (1st season)
- Base defense: 4–3
- Home stadium: Sun Life Stadium

2011 Atlantic Coast Conference football standings
	Conf.			Overall
Team	W		L	W		L
Atlantic Division
No. 22 Clemson x$	6	–	2	10	–	4
Wake Forest	5	–	3	6	–	7
No. 23 Florida State	5	–	3	9	–	4
NC State	4	–	4	8	–	5
Boston College	3	–	5	4	–	8
Maryland	1	–	7	2	–	10
Coastal Division
No. 21 Virginia Tech x%	7	–	1	11	–	3
Virginia	5	–	3	8	–	5
Georgia Tech	5	–	3	8	–	5
Miami (FL)	3	–	5	6	–	6
North Carolina	3	–	5	7	–	6
Duke	1	–	7	3	–	9
Championship: Clemson 38, Virginia Tech 10
$ – BCS representative as conference champion; % – BCS at-large representative; x – Division champion/co-champions; Rankings from AP Poll

The 2011 Miami Hurricanes football team represented the University of Miami during the 2011 NCAA Division I FBS football season. It was the Hurricanes' 86th season of football and 8th as a member of the Atlantic Coast Conference. The Hurricanes were led by first-year head coach Al Golden and played their home games at Sun Life Stadium. They finished the season 6–6 overall and 3–5 in the ACC to finish in a two-way tie for fourth place in the Coastal Division. The Hurricanes served a self-imposed bowl ban due to an ongoing NCAA investigation.

== Schedule ==
Date	Time	Opponent	Site	TV	Result	Attendance
September 5	8:00 pm	at Maryland	Byrd Stadium; College Park, MD	ESPN	L 24–32	52,875
September 17	7:30 pm	No. 17 Ohio State*	Sun Life Stadium; Miami Gardens, FL	ESPN	W 24–6	66,279
September 24	3:30 pm	Kansas State*	Sun Life Stadium; Miami Gardens, FL	ESPNU	L 24–28	43,786
October 1	3:30 pm	Bethune-Cookman*	Sun Life Stadium; Miami Gardens, FL	ESPNU	W 45–14	40,387
October 8	3:30 pm	at No. 21 Virginia Tech	Lane Stadium; Blacksburg, VA (rivalry)	ABC/ESPN	L 35–38	66,233
October 15	12:30 pm	at North Carolina	Kenan Memorial Stadium; Chapel Hill, NC	ACCN	W 30–24	60,000
October 22	3:30 pm	No. 20 Georgia Tech	Sun Life Stadium; Miami Gardens, FL	ESPN	W 24–7	43,716
October 27	8:00 pm	Virginia	Sun Life Stadium; Miami Gardens, FL	ESPN	L 21–28	40,403
November 5	3:30 pm	Duke^{†}	Sun Life Stadium; Miami Gardens, FL	SUN	W 49–14	62,053
November 12	3:30 pm	at Florida State	Doak Campbell Stadium; Tallahassee, FL (rivalry)	ABC/ESPN	L 19–23	82,322
November 19	3:30 pm	at South Florida*	Raymond James Stadium; Tampa, FL	ESPNU	W 6–3	47,745
November 25	3:30 pm	Boston College	Sun Life Stadium; Miami Gardens, FL	ABC	L 17–24	44,954
*Non-conference game; ^{†}Homecoming; Rankings from AP Poll released prior to the game; All times are in Eastern time

== Personnel ==
=== Coaching staff ===
Name	Position	Seasons	Alma mater
Al Golden	Head coach	1st	Penn State (1991)
Mark D'Onofrio	Assistant head coach/defensive coordinator	1st	Penn State (1991)
Jedd Fisch	Offensive coordinator/quarterbacks	1st	Florida (1998)
Jethro Franklin	Defensive line	1st	Fresno State (1989)
George McDonald	Wide receivers	1st	Illinois (1999)
Brennan Carroll	Tight ends/national recruiting coordinator	1st	Pittsburgh (2001)
Art Kehoe	Offensive line	22nd	Miami (1982)
Paul Williams	Defensive backs	1st	Delaware (1996)
Micheal Barrow	Special teams coordinator/linebackers	5th	Miami (1993)
Terry Richardson	Running back/Florida recruiting coordinator	1st	Syracuse (1994)

=== Support staff ===
Name	Position	Seasons	Alma mater
Andreu Swasey	Strength & conditioning	11th	Baylor (1995)
Benny Fernandez	Graduate assistant	1st	Miami (2008)
Phillip Eisenstein	Graduate assistant	1st	
Matt Applebaum	Graduate assistant	1st	UConn (2007)

=== Roster ===
2011 Miami Hurricanes football team roster
Players
Coaches
Offense

Pos.	#	Name	Class
TE	86	Blake Ayles	Sr
WR	18	Chad Barnes	So
OL	73	Jermaine Barton	Fr
WR	3	Travis Benjamin	Sr
WR	87	Ben Bruneau	Sr
OL	79	Malcolm Bunche	Fr
WR	2	LaRon Byrd	Sr
TE	43	John Calhoun	Jr
RB	23	Eduardo Clements	So
TE	82	Asante Cleveland	So
WR	85	Phillip Dorsett	Fr
TE	49	Dyron Dye	So
OL	70	Jon Feliciano	Fr
OL	61	Joel Figueroa	Sr
TE	9	Chase Ford	Sr
OL	66	Harland Gunn	Sr
RB	33	Maurice Hagans	So
RB	19	Darion Hall	Fr
QB	12	Jacory Harris	Sr
OL	77	Seantrel Henderson	So
RB	34	C.J. Holton	Jr
OL	63	Tyler Horn	Sr
RB	47	Darris Hughes	So
WR	1	Allen Hurns	So
RB	5	Mike James	Jr
OL	78	Jermaine Johnson	So
OL	55	Ben Jones	Jr
WR	41	Garrett Kidd	Fr
WR	25	DeAndre Lewis	Fr
OL	68	Jeremy Lewis	Jr
OL	65	Brandon Linder	So
OL	69	Eduardo Lopez	So
OL	62	Shane McDermott	Fr
RB	6	Lamar Miller	So
QB	17	Stephen Morris	So
WR	28	Shawn O'Dare	So
TE	95	David Perry	Fr
TE	88	Billy Sanders	So
WR	80	Rashawn Scott	Fr
WR	8	Tommy Streeter	Jr
WR	83	Kendal Thompkins	Jr
RB	38	David Thompson	Jr
TE	46	Clive Walford	Fr
OL	72	Brandon Washington	Jr
OL	64	Hunter Wells	Fr
OL	75	Jared Wheeler	So
TE	84	Cory White	So
QB	11	Ryan Williams	So

Defense

Pos.	#	Name	Class
LB	51	Erik Akre	So
DL	50	Junior Alexis	Fr
DB	13	Thurston Armbrister	Fr
DB	26	Ray-Ray Armstrong	Jr
LB	45	Ramon Buchanan	Sr
LB	94	Kelvin Cain	So
DB	32	Lee Chambers	Sr
DL	71	Anthony Chickillo	Fr
DB	39	Tyrone Cornelius	So
LB	47	Akil Craig	So
DB	25	Dallas Crawford	Fr
DB	46	Hugo Delapenha Jr.	So
DL	90	Chris Dunckel	Jr
LB	40	Nantambu-Akil Fentress	Fr
DB	20	Thomas Finnie	Fr
DL	99	Marcus Fortson	Jr
LB	58	Jordan Futch	Sr
LB	59	James Gaines	So
DB	37	Nathan Gholston	Jr
LB	53	Sean Goldstein	Jr
DL	51	Shayon Green	So
DL	92	Jalen Grimble	Fr
DE	76	Sean Harvey	So
DB	30	A.J. Highsmith	So
DB	43	Ken Jackson	Fr
DB	24	Davon Johnson	Jr
LB	44	Eddie Johnson	Fr
DL	76	Corey King	Fr
LB	57	Miles Levine	Sr
LB	57	Erik Lichter	Jr
DB	21	Brandon McGee	Jr
DB	29	JoJo Nicolas	Sr
DL	97	Adewale Ojomo	Jr
LB	36	Gionni Paul	Fr
DB	27	Keion Payne	Fr
LB	52	Denzel Perryman	Fr
DE	91	Olson Pierre	Fr
DL	96	Curtis Porter	So
DL	54	Micanor Regis	Sr
DL	93	Luther Robinson	So
DL	56	Marcus Robinson	Sr
DB	22	Kacy Rodgers	So
DL	48	Andrew Smith	Sr
DL	98	Darius Smith	Jr
LB	31	Sean Spence	Sr
DB	28	Andrew Swasey	Jr
DB	7	Vaughn Telemaque	Jr
DB	38	Jordan Tolson	Fr
DL	35	Olivier Vernon	Jr
DB	41	Mike Williams	Sr
DL	90	Ricardo Williams	Fr
DB	19	Robert Wright	Fr

Special teams

Pos.	#	Name	Class
P	13	Dalton Botts	So
P	15	Cameron Dean	Jr
K	18	Matt Goudis	Fr
K	15	Ben Hopfinger	Fr
K/P	37	Alex Irastoza	So
LS	60	Chris Ivory	Sr
LS	64	Sean McNally	Jr
K	40	Jake Wieclaw	Jr

Head coach

- Al Golden (1st year)

Coordinators/assistant coaches

- Mark D'Onofrio – Assistant Head Coach/Defensive Coordinator
- Jedd Fisch – Offensive Coordinator
- Michael Barrow – Linebackers/Special Teams
- Brennan Carroll – Tight Ends/National Recruiting Coordinator
- Jethro Franklin – Senior Defensive Assistant/Defensive Line
- Art Kehoe – Offensive Line
- George McDonald – Wide Receivers
- Terry Richardson – Running Backs/Florida Recruiting Coordinator
- Paul Williams – Defensive Backs

Legend

- (C) Team captain
- (S) Suspended
- (I) Ineligible
- Injured
- Redshirt

Roster

=== Depth chart ===
Defense
http://hurricanesports.cstv.com/sports/m-footbl/spec-rel/041811aab.html

FS
JoJo Nicolas
A.J. Highsmith

WLB	MLB	SLB
⋅	Sean Spence	⋅
Marcus Robinson OR Jordan Futch	James Gaines	⋅

SS
Vaughn Telemaque
Ray-Ray Armstrong

CB
Mike Williams
Kacy Rodgers

DE	DT	DT	DE
Olivier Vernon	Darius Smith	Adewale Ojomo	Anthony Chickillo
Andrew Smith	Micanor Regis	Curtis Porter	Shayon Green

CB
Brandon McGee
Thomas Finnie

Offense
http://hurricanesports.cstv.com/sports/m-footbl/spec-rel/041811aab.html

WR
Tommy Streeter
LaRon Byrd

LT	LG	C	RG	RT
Brandon Washington	Harland Gunn	Tyler Horn	Brandon Linder	Jon Feliciano OR Malcolm Bunche
Joel Figueroa	Jeremy Lewis	Shane McDermott	Jared Wheeler	⋅

TE
Dyron Dye
Clive Walford

WR
Travis Benjamin
Phillip Dorsett

QB
Jacory Harris
Stephen Morris

RB
Lamar Miller
Mike James OR Eduardo Clements

FB
Maurice Hagens
John Calhoun

Special teams
PK Jake Wieclaw
P Dalton Botts
KR Lamar Miller AND Travis Benjamin
PR Travis Benjamin
LS Chris Ivory
H Spencer Whipple

== Preseason ==
=== Scandal ===
The Hurricanes faced adversity even before the first down of football as twelve players were forced to pay restitution and eight players were suspended for accepting money and gifts from former booster Nevin Shapiro, a convicted Ponzi schemer serving a 20-year prison sentence. The players suspended were Jacory Harris (one game), Sean Spence (one game), Travis Benjamin (one game), Marcus Forston (one game), Adewale Ojomo (one game), Ray-Ray Armstrong (four games), Dyron Dye (four games), and Olivier Vernon (six games).

On November 20, Miami announced it was withdrawing from bowl consideration due to an ongoing NCAA investigation into the Shapiro affair.

== Regular season ==
=== Maryland ===
Al Golden's first game as head coach.

	1	2	3	4	Total
Miami (FL)	0	14	7	3	24
Maryland	7	13	3	9	32

Scoring summary

Quarter	Time	Drive			Team	Scoring information	Score	
Quarter	Time	Plays	Yards	TOP	Team	Scoring information	Miami (FL)	Maryland
1	11:21	11	79	3:39	Maryland	Ronnie Tyler 10-yard touchdown reception from Danny O'Brien, Nick Ferrara kick good	0	7
2	12:52	11	62	3:35	Maryland	24-yard field goal by Nick Ferrara	0	10
2	9:12	7	60	3:33	Miami (FL)	Mike James (American football) 1-yard touchdown run, Jake Wieclaw kick good	7	10
2	5:50	11	72	3:15	Maryland	29-yard field goal by Nick Ferrara	7	13
2	4:04	5	68	1:40	Miami (FL)	Lamar Miller 41-yard touchdown run, Jake Wieclaw kick good	14	13
2	0:47				Maryland	Fumble recovery returned 30 yards for touchdown by Joe Vellano, Nick Ferrara kick good	14	20
3	10:08	9	62	4:46	Miami (FL)	Stephen Morris 5-yard touchdown run, Jake Wieclaw kick good	21	20
3	5:02	14	68	4:59	Maryland	28-yard field goal by Nick Ferrara	21	23
4	4:01	15	67	8:25	Miami (FL)	30-yard field goal by Jake Wieclaw	24	23
4	1:39	6	60	2:17	Maryland	32-yard field goal by Nick Ferrara	24	26
4	0:39				Maryland	Interception returned 54 yards for touchdown by Cameron Chism, 2-point pass failed	24	32
"TOP" = time of possession. For other American football terms, see Glossary of American football.							24	32

=== Ohio State ===
Team	1	2	3	4	Total
Ohio State	0	6	0	0	6
• Miami (FL)	14	3	0	7	24

- Date: September 17
- Location: Sun Life Stadium, Miami Gardens, FL
- Game start: 7:30 p.m. EST
- Elapsed time: 3:00
- Game attendance: 66,279
- Game weather: Mostly Cloudy, 83 °F (28 °C), Wind ENE 10 mph (16 km/h)
- Referee: Bill LeMonnier
- TV announcers (ESPN): Brad Nessler (Play-by-play), Todd Blackledge (Color) & Holly Rowe (Sideline)

Scoring summary
1	12:47	MIA	Allen Hurns 3-yard pass from Jacory Harris (Jake Wieclaw kick)	MIA 7-0
1	5:12	MIA	Allen Hurns 3-yard pass from Jacory Harris (Jake Wieclaw kick)	MIA 14-0
2	6:28	OSU	Drew Basil 22-yard field goal	MIA 14-3
2	3:40	OSU	Drew Basil 24-yard field goal	MIA 14-6
2	0:00	MIA	Jake Wieclaw 25-yard field goal	MIA 17-6
4	0:33	MIA	Mike James 1-yard run (Jake Wieclaw kick)	MIA 24-6

=== Kansas State ===
	1	2	3	4	Total
Kansas State	7	7	7	7	28
Miami (FL)	3	0	14	7	24

=== Bethune-Cookman ===
	1	2	3	4	Total
Bethune-Cookman	7	0	7	0	14
Miami (FL)	0	14	10	21	45

=== Virginia Tech ===
	1	2	3	4	Total
Miami (FL)	0	7	7	21	35
Virginia Tech	7	14	3	14	38

=== North Carolina ===
	1	2	3	4	Total
Miami (FL)	17	10	0	3	30
North Carolina	0	10	0	14	24

=== Georgia Tech ===
	1	2	3	4	Total
Georgia Tech	0	7	0	0	7
Miami (FL)	7	14	0	3	24

=== Virginia ===
	1	2	3	4	Total
Virginia	7	10	3	8	28
Miami (FL)	0	7	7	7	21

=== Duke ===
	1	2	3	4	Total
Duke	0	7	7	0	14
Miami (FL)	14	14	7	14	49

=== Florida State ===
	1	2	3	4	Total
Miami (FL)	0	7	0	12	19
Florida State	3	14	3	3	23

=== South Florida ===
Team	1	2	3	4	Total
• Miami (FL)	3	0	0	3	6
South Florida	0	3	0	0	3

- Date: November 19
- Location: Raymond James Stadium, Tampa, FL
- Game start: 3:30 p.m. EST
- Television network: ESPNU

Scoring summary
1	2:08	MIA	Jake Wieclaw 26-yard field goal	MIA 3-0
2	13:48	USF	Maikon Bonani 42-yard field goal	Tied 3-3
4	0:00	MIA	Jake Wieclaw 36-yard field goal	MIA 6-3

=== Boston College ===
	1	2	3	4	Total
Boston College	7	3	7	7	24
Miami (FL)	14	0	0	3	17
