= 2011 NC State Wolfpack football team =

American college football season

2011 NC State Wolfpack football

Belk Bowl champion

Belk Bowl, W 31–24 vs Louisville
- Conference: Atlantic Coast Conference
- Atlantic Division
- Record: 8–5 (4–4 ACC)
- Head coach: Tom O'Brien (5th season)
- Offensive coordinator: Dana Bible (5th season)
- Offensive scheme: Pro-style
- Defensive coordinator: Mike Archer (5th season)
- Base defense: 4–3
- Home stadium: Carter–Finley Stadium

2011 Atlantic Coast Conference football standings
	Conf.			Overall
Team	W		L	W		L
Atlantic Division
No. 22 Clemson x$	6	–	2	10	–	4
Wake Forest	5	–	3	6	–	7
No. 23 Florida State	5	–	3	9	–	4
NC State	4	–	4	8	–	5
Boston College	3	–	5	4	–	8
Maryland	1	–	7	2	–	10
Coastal Division
No. 21 Virginia Tech x%	7	–	1	11	–	3
Virginia	5	–	3	8	–	5
Georgia Tech	5	–	3	8	–	5
Miami (FL)	3	–	5	6	–	6
North Carolina	3	–	5	7	–	6
Duke	1	–	7	3	–	9
Championship: Clemson 38, Virginia Tech 10
$ – BCS representative as conference champion; % – BCS at-large representative; x – Division champion/co-champions; Rankings from AP Poll

The 2011 NC State Wolfpack football team represented North Carolina State University in the 2011 NCAA Division I FBS football season. The Wolfpack were led by fifth-year head coach Tom O'Brien and played their home games at Carter–Finley Stadium. They are members of the Atlantic Division of the Atlantic Coast Conference. They finished the season 8–5, 4–4 in ACC play to finish in fourth place in the Atlantic Division. They were invited to the Belk Bowl, where they defeated Louisville, 31–24.

== Schedule ==
Date	Time	Opponent	Site	TV	Result	Attendance
September 3	6:00 pm	No. 22 (FCS) Liberty*	Carter–Finley Stadium; Raleigh, NC	ESPN3	W 43–21	56,564
September 10	3:30 pm	at Wake Forest	BB&T Field; Winston-Salem, NC (rivalry)	FSN	L 27–34	32,423
September 17	5:00 pm	South Alabama*	Carter–Finley Stadium; Raleigh, NC	ESPN3	W 35–13	56,756
September 22	8:00 pm	at Cincinnati*	Nippert Stadium; Cincinnati, OH	ESPN	L 14–44	28,431
October 1	3:30 pm	No. 21 Georgia Tech	Carter–Finley Stadium; Raleigh, NC	ABC/ESPN	L 35–45	55,811
October 8	3:30 pm	Central Michigan*	Carter–Finley Stadium; Raleigh, NC	ESPN3	W 38–24	54,388
October 22	3:30 pm	at Virginia	Scott Stadium; Charlottesville, VA	ESPNU	W 28–14	46,030
October 29	12:00 pm	at Florida State	Doak Campbell Stadium; Tallahassee, FL	ESPNU	L 0–34	80,849
November 5	12:30 pm	North Carolina	Carter–Finley Stadium; Raleigh, NC (rivalry)	ACCN	W 13–0	57,583
November 12	1:00 pm	at Boston College	Alumni Stadium; Chestnut Hill, MA	ACCN	L 10–14	33,712
November 19	3:30 pm	No. 8 Clemson^{†}	Carter–Finley Stadium; Raleigh, NC (Textile Bowl)	ABC/ESPN	W 37–13	57,583
November 26	12:30 pm	Maryland	Carter–Finley Stadium; Raleigh, NC	ACCN	W 56–41	55,323
December 27	8:00 pm	vs. Louisville*	Bank of America Stadium; Charlotte, NC (Belk Bowl)	ESPN	W 31–24	58,427
*Non-conference game; ^{†}Homecoming; Rankings from Coaches Poll released prior to the game; All times are in Eastern time

== Game summaries ==
=== Clemson ===
Team	1	2	3	4	Total
Clemson	3	0	3	7	13
• North Carolina State	0	27	10	0	37

- Date: November 19
- Location: Carter–Finley Stadium, Raleigh, NC
- Game start: 3:30 p.m. EST
- TV announcers (ABC/ESPN): Mike Patrick, Craig James

Scoring summary
1	6:50	CLEM	Chandler Catanzaro 24-yard field goal	CLEM 3-0
2	11:35	NCST	George Bryan 11-yard pass from Mike Glennon (Niklas Sade kick)	NCST 7-3
2	10:33	NCST	Jay Smith 7-yard pass from Mike Glennon (Niklas Sade kick)	NCST 14-3
2	7:26	NCST	Niklas Sade 21-yard field goal	NCST 17-3
2	4:58	NCST	Tony Creecy 4-yard run (Niklas Sade kick)	NCST 24-3
2	0:05	NCST	Niklas Sade 32-yard field goal	NCST 27-3
3	10:18	NCST	Niklas Sade 21-yard field goal	NCST 30-3
3	8:44	CLEM	Chandler Catanzaro 32-yard field goal	NCST 30-6
3	5:41	NCST	Tobias Palmer 41-yard pass from Mike Glennon (Niklas Sade kick)	NCST 37-6
4	1:22	CLEM	Mike Bellamy 2-yard run (Chandler Catanzaro kick)	NCST 37-13
