= 2011 Wake Forest Demon Deacons football team =

American college football season

2011 Wake Forest Demon Deacons football

Music City Bowl, L 17–23 vs. Mississippi State
- Conference: Atlantic Coast Conference
- Atlantic Division
- Record: 6–7 (5–3 ACC)
- Head coach: Jim Grobe (11th season)
- Offensive coordinator: Steed Lobotzke (9th season)
- Offensive scheme: Spread
- Co-defensive coordinators: Tim Billings (1st season); Brian Knorr (1st season)
- Base defense: Multiple
- Captain: Game captains
- Home stadium: BB&T Field

2011 Atlantic Coast Conference football standings
	Conf.			Overall
Team	W		L	W		L
Atlantic Division
No. 22 Clemson x$	6	–	2	10	–	4
Wake Forest	5	–	3	6	–	7
No. 23 Florida State	5	–	3	9	–	4
NC State	4	–	4	8	–	5
Boston College	3	–	5	4	–	8
Maryland	1	–	7	2	–	10
Coastal Division
No. 21 Virginia Tech x%	7	–	1	11	–	3
Virginia	5	–	3	8	–	5
Georgia Tech	5	–	3	8	–	5
Miami (FL)	3	–	5	6	–	6
North Carolina	3	–	5	7	–	6
Duke	1	–	7	3	–	9
Championship: Clemson 38, Virginia Tech 10
$ – BCS representative as conference champion; % – BCS at-large representative; x – Division champion/co-champions; Rankings from AP Poll

The 2011 Wake Forest Demon Deacons football team represented Wake Forest University during the 2011 NCAA Division I FBS football season. The team was coached by Jim Grobe, who was coaching his eleventh season at the school, and played its home games at BB&T Field. Wake Forest competes in the Atlantic Coast Conference, as they have since the league's inception in 1953, and are in the Atlantic Division. They finished the season 6–7, 5–3 in ACC play to finish in a tie for second place in the Atlantic Division. They were invited to the Music City Bowl where they were defeated by Mississippi State 17–23.

== Before the season ==
=== Recruiting ===
On National Signing Day, the Demon Deacons received letters of intent from 14 players.

College recruiting information
Name	Hometown	School	Height	Weight	40^{‡}	Commit date
Brandon Chubb; ILB	Powder Springs, GA	Hillgrove HS	6 ft 0 in (1.83 m)	230 lb (100 kg)	4.78	Jan 28, 2011
Brandon Chubb; ILB	Recruit ratings: Scout: Rivals: (45)					
Desmond Floyd; DE	Jonesville, SC	Union County HS	6 ft 5 in (1.96 m)	235 lb (107 kg)	4.97	Aug 9, 2010
Desmond Floyd; DE	Recruit ratings: Scout: Rivals: (77)					
Hunter Goodwin; OT	Baltimore, MD	Gilman School	6 ft 4 in (1.93 m)	285 lb (129 kg)	N/A	Apr 4, 2010
Hunter Goodwin; OT	Recruit ratings: Scout: Rivals: (75)					
Chad Hedlund; K	Argyle, TX	Argyle HS	6 ft 1 in (1.85 m)	180 lb (82 kg)	N/A	Feb 15, 2011
Chad Hedlund; K	Recruit ratings: Scout: Rivals: (77)					
Josh Hunt; OLB	Duncanville, TX	Duncanville HS	6 ft 1 in (1.85 m)	210 lb (95 kg)	N/A	Jan 31, 2011
Josh Hunt; OLB	Recruit ratings: Scout: Rivals: (45)					
Dylan Intemann; OG	Wake Forest, NC	Wake Forest-Rolesville HS	6 ft 5 in (1.96 m)	300 lb (140 kg)	5.00	Apr 4, 2010
Dylan Intemann; OG	Recruit ratings: Scout: Rivals: (77)					
DeAndre Martin; RB	Hialeah, FL	Hialeah-Miami Lakes HS	6 ft 3 in (1.91 m)	195 lb (88 kg)	N/A	Jan 23, 2011
DeAndre Martin; RB	Recruit ratings: Scout: Rivals: (77)					
Godspower Offor; DE	Hialeah, FL	American Senior HS	6 ft 2 in (1.88 m)	220 lb (100 kg)	4.6	Jul 19, 2010
Godspower Offor; DE	Recruit ratings: Scout: Rivals: (78)					
Cody Preble; OL	Lake Worth, FL	Park Vista HS	6 ft 5 in (1.96 m)	315 lb (143 kg)	5.1	Jan 7, 2010
Cody Preble; OL	Recruit ratings: Scout: Rivals: (74)					
Sherman Ragland III; WR	Durham, NC	Southern HS	6 ft 1 in (1.85 m)	195 lb (88 kg)	4.5	Jul 18, 2010
Sherman Ragland III; WR	Recruit ratings: Scout: Rivals: (77)					
Allen Ramsey; CB	Fort Lauderdale, FL	Dillard HS	5 ft 11 in (1.80 m)	175 lb (79 kg)	N/A	Jul 21, 2010
Allen Ramsey; CB	Recruit ratings: Scout: Rivals: (75)					
Orville Reynolds; RB	Parkland, FL	Stoneman Douglas HS	5 ft 8 in (1.73 m)	175 lb (79 kg)	4.5	Jun 14, 2010
Orville Reynolds; RB	Recruit ratings: Scout: Rivals: (77)					
Kevin Sousa; QB	Orlando, FL	Lake Nona HS	6 ft 3 in (1.91 m)	230 lb (100 kg)	4.7	Nov 30, 2010
Kevin Sousa; QB	Recruit ratings: Scout: Rivals: (78)					
Andre Wiggins; OLB	San Antonio, TX	Madison HS	6 ft 2 in (1.88 m)	200 lb (91 kg)	4.65	Dec 6, 2010
Andre Wiggins; OLB	Recruit ratings: Scout: Rivals: (45)					
Airyn Willis; WR	High Point, NC	Southwest Guilford HS	6 ft 2 in (1.88 m)	180 lb (82 kg)	4.43	Feb 1, 2011
Airyn Willis; WR	Recruit ratings: Scout: Rivals: (79)					
Overall recruit ranking:
‡ Refers to 40-yard dash; Note: In many cases, Scout, Rivals, 247Sports, On3, and ESPN may conflict in their listings of height, weight and 40 time.; In these cases, the average was taken. ESPN grades are on a 100-point scale.; Sources: "Wake Forest 2011 Football Commitments". Rivals.; "2011 Wake Forest Commits". Scout.; "2011 Player Commitments – Wake Forest". ESPN.; "Scout.com Team Recruiting Rankings". Scout.; "2011 Team Ranking". Rivals.com.

== Schedule ==
Date	Time	Opponent	Site	TV	Result	Attendance	Source
September 1	8:00 pm	at Syracuse*	Carrier Dome; Syracuse, NY	ESPN3	L 29–36 ^{OT}	40,833	
September 10	3:30 pm	NC State	BB&T Field; Winston-Salem, NC (rivalry)	ACCRSN	W 34–27	32,423	
September 17	6:30 pm	Gardner–Webb*	BB&T Field; Winston-Salem, NC	ESPN3	W 48–5	28,765	
October 1	12:30 pm	at Boston College	Alumni Stadium; Chestnut Hill, MA	ACCN	W 27–19	38,265	
October 8	12:30 pm	No. 22 Florida State	BB&T Field; Winston-Salem, NC	ACCN	W 35–30	33,116	
October 15	6:30 pm	No. 17 Virginia Tech^{†}	BB&T Field; Winston-Salem, NC	ESPN3	L 17–38	35,026	
October 22	12:30 pm	at Duke	Wallace Wade Stadium; Durham, NC (rivalry)	ACCN	W 24–23	22,258	
October 29	3:30 pm	at North Carolina	Kenan Memorial Stadium; Chapel Hill, NC (rivalry)	ESPNU	L 24–49	57,000	
November 5	8:00 pm	Notre Dame*	BB&T Field; Winston-Salem, NC	ABC/ESPN2	L 17–24	36,307	
November 12	12:00 pm	at No. 10 Clemson	Memorial Stadium; Clemson, SC	ESPNU	L 28–31	78,375	
November 19	3:00 pm	Maryland	BB&T Field; Winston-Salem, NC	ACCRSN	W 31–10	30,112	
November 26	3:30 pm	Vanderbilt*	BB&T Field; Winston-Salem, NC	ESPNU	L 7–41	28,020	
December 30	6:40 pm	vs. Mississippi State*	LP Field; Nashville, TN (Music City Bowl)	ESPN	L 17–23	55,208	
*Non-conference game; ^{†}Homecoming; Rankings from Coaches' Poll released prior to the game; All times are in Eastern time

== Roster ==
2011 Wake Forest Demon Deacons roster
Offense Quarterbacks: 7 Keenon Rush – (redshirt) Freshman; 8 Kevin Sousa – Freshman; 10 Tanner Price – Sophomore; 12 Brendan Cross – (redshirt) Sophomore; 13 Ted Stachitas – (redshirt) Junior; 14 Patrick Thompson – (redshirt) Freshman; 15 Matt Grasmeyer – Freshman; 17 Patrick Long – Freshman; Running backs: 22 Brandon Pendergrass – (redshirt) Senior; 24 Khiry Sutton – (redshirt) Freshman; 25 Josh Harris – (redshirt) Sophomore; 27 Orville Reynolds – Freshman; 28 Deandre Martin – Freshman; 29 Tyler Jackson – (redshirt) Freshman; 44 Ben Emert – (redshirt) Freshman; Fullbacks: 42 Tommy Bohanon – Junior; 48 Jordan Garside – (redshirt) Freshman; Wide receivers: 2 Chris Givens – (redshirt) Junior; 3 Michael Campanaro – (redshirt) Sophomore; 9 Turner Faulk – Senior; 11 Airyn Willis – Freshman; 18 Danny Dembry – (redshirt) Senior; 20 Lovell Jackson – (redshirt) Junior; 26 Sherman Ragland III – Freshman; 81 Terence Davis – (redshirt) Junior; 82 P.J. Howard IV – Freshman; 86 Brandon Terry – (redshirt) Freshman; 87 Matt James – (redshirt) Freshman; 88 Quan Rucker – (redshirt) Sophomore; Tight ends: 80 Andrew Parker – Senior; 83 Cameron Ford – (redshirt) Senior; 84 Johnny Garcia – (redshirt) Freshman; 85 Neil Basford – (redshirt) Freshman; 89 Spencer Bishop – (redshirt) Sophomore; Offensive Linemen: 59 Antonio Ford – (redshirt) Freshman; 60 Whit Barnes – (redshirt) Sophomore; 62 Doug Weaver – (redshirt) Senior; 63 Dylan Intemann – Freshman; 66 Chance Raines – (redshirt) Junior; 68 Colin Summers – (redshirt) Freshman; 69 Dennis Godfrey – (redshirt) Senior; 70 Dylan Heartsill – (redshirt) Freshman; 71 Hunter Goodwin – Freshman; 72 Cody Preble – Freshman; 73 Steven Chase – (redshirt) Sophomore; 74 Garrick Williams – (redshirt) Junior; 75 Michael Hoag – (redshirt) Senior; 76 Daniel Blitch – (redshirt) Freshman; 77 Devin Bolling – (redshirt) Sophomore; 78 Joe Looney – Senior; 79 Gabe Irby – (redshirt) Junior	Defense Defensive ends: 49 Derricus Ellis – (redshirt) Junior; 51 Daniel Vogelsang – (redshirt) Freshman; 54 Kris Redding – (redshirt) Sophomore; 55 Tristan Dorty – (redshirt) Senior; 56 Gods-Power Offor – Freshman; 57 Gelo Orange – (redshirt) Senior; 90 Mike White – (redshirt) Senior; 91 John Gallagher – (redshirt) Sophomore; 94 Desmond Floyd – Freshman; 98 Zach Thompson – (redshirt) Sophomore; Defensive tackles: 50 Nikita Whitlock – (redshirt) Sophomore; 92 Bryson Dunmeyer – (redshirt) Junior; 93 Frank Souza – (redshirt) Sophomore; 99 Ramon Booi – (redshirt) Junior; Linebackers: 28 Jharrison Gillespie – (redshirt) Sophomore; 30 Hunter Williams – Freshman; 32 Scott Betros – (redshirt) Junior; 35 Zachary Allen – (redshirt) Freshman; 36 Andre Wiggins – Freshman; 39 Justin Jackson – (redshirt) Sophomore; 40 Joey Ehrmann – (redshirt) Junior; 41 Mike Olson – (redshirt) Sophomore; 43 Kyle Jarrett – (redshirt) Senior; 45 Riley Haynes – (redshirt) Junior; 46 Josh Hunt – Freshman; 48 Brandon Chubb – Freshman; 53 Jordan Pineda – Freshman; 58 J.D. Oglesby – (redshirt) Sophomore; 60 Barrett Powell – (redshirt) Junior; 97 Kyle Wilber – (redshirt) Senior; Cornerbacks: 6 Kenny Okoro – (redshirt) Junior; 7 Merrill Noel – (redshirt) Freshman; 9 Kevin Johnson – Sophomore; 14 Jason Green – (redshirt) Sophomore; 15 Allen Ramsey – Freshman; 17 A.J. Marshall – Sophomore; 29 Dominique Tate – (redshirt) Sophomore; 37 Morgan Harris – (redshirt) Junior; Safeties: 4 Josh Bush – (redshirt) Senior; 5 Cyhl Quarles – (redshirt) Senior; 18 Josh Strickland – (redshirt) Sophomore; 21 Desmond Cooper – (redshirt) Freshman; 23 Daniel Mack – (redshirt) Sophomore; 25 Joe LaBarbera – (redshirt) Freshman; 34 Duran Lowe – (redshirt) Sophomore	Special teams Placekickers: 20 Chad Hedlund – Freshman; 82 Jimmy Newman – Junior; Punters: 24 Alex Wulfeck – (redshirt) Sophomore; 38 Alexander Kinal – Freshman; Long Snappers: 52 Logan Feimster – (redshirt) Freshman; 61 Ryan Bauder – Freshman; 64 Britt Cherry – Freshman; Kick returners: 2 Chris Givens – (redshirt) Junior; 7 Merrill Noel – (redshirt) Freshman; 20 Lovell Jackson – (redshirt) Junior; 28 Michael Campanaro – (redshirt) Sophomore; Punt Returners: 20 Lovell Jackson – (redshirt) Junior; 28 Michael Campanaro – (redshirt) Sophomore

== Coaching staff ==
Position	Name	First year at WFU
Head coach	Jim Grobe	2001
Co-defensive coordinator/outside linebackers	Tim Billings	2001
Passing Game Co-Coordinator/quarterbacks	Tom Elrod	2003
Passing Game Co-Coordinator/wide receivers	Lonnie Galloway	2011
Assistant coach/special teams coordinator	Keith Henry	2006
Co-defensive coordinator/linebackers	Brian Knorr	2008
Offensive coordinator/offensive line	Steed Lobotzke	2001
Recruiting coordinator/defensive tackles	Ray McCartney	2001
Associate head coach/Running backs/kickers	Billy Mitchell	2001
Assistant coach/secondary	Steve Russ	2008

== Game summaries ==
=== Syracuse ===
	1	2	3	4	OT	Total
Wake Forest	3	17	6	3	0	29
Syracuse	0	7	7	15	7	36

2nd meeting. 1–0 all time. Last meeting 2006, 20–10 Demon Deacons in Winston-Salem.

Passing Leaders	Rushing Leaders	Receiving Leaders	Total Yards
Tanner Price: 18/31, 289 YDS, 3 TD	Josh Harris: 22 CAR, 66 YDS, LG of 16	Chris Givens: 8 REC, 179 YDS, 2 TD, LG of 60	Wake Forest: 391
Ted Stachitas: 1/7, 4 YDS	Brandon Pendergrass: 9 CAR, 15 YDS, LG of 6	Michael Campanaro: 7 REC, 79 YDS, TD, LG of 19	Syracuse: 299

=== NC State ===
	1	2	3	4	Total
NC State	0	6	14	7	27
Wake Forest	10	10	14	0	34

105th meeting. 36–62–6 all time. Last meeting 2010, 38–3 Wolfpack in Raleigh.

Passing Leaders	Rushing Leaders	Receiving Leaders	Total Yards
Tanner Price: 22/35, 297 YDS, TD	Josh Harris: 23 CAR, 96 YDS, TD, LG of 21	Chris Givens: 6 REC, 111 YDS, LG of 41	Wake Forest: 438
Michael Campanaro: 1/1, 40 YDS, TD	Chris Givens: 1 CAR, 12 YDS, LG of 12	Danny Dembry: 6 REC, 96 YDS, TD, LG of 40	NC State: 424

=== Gardner-Webb ===
	1	2	3	4	Total
Gardner-Webb	5	0	0	0	5
Wake Forest	10	17	14	7	48

1st meeting.

Passing Leaders	Rushing Leaders	Receiving Leaders	Total Yards
Tanner Price: 21/32, 281 YDS, 2 TD	Josh Harris: 14 CAR, 54 YDS, LG of 10	Danny Dembry: 8 REC, 126 YDS, LG of 34	Wake Forest: 454
Ted Stachitas: 3/3, 18 YDS	Brandon Pendergrass: 10 CAR, 49 YDS, TD, LG of 34	Chris Givens: 7 REC, 85 YDS, TD, LG of 22	Gardner-Webb: 139

=== Boston College ===
	1	2	3	4	Total
Wake Forest	7	10	7	3	27
Boston College	3	6	0	10	19

19th meeting. 6–10–2 all time. Last meeting 2010, 23–13 Eagles in Winston-Salem.

Passing Leaders	Rushing Leaders	Receiving Leaders	Total Yards
Tanner Price: 19/29, 252 YDS, TD	Josh Harris: 19 CAR, 60 YDS, TD, LG of 13	Chris Givens: 7 REC, 132 YDS, TD, LG of 47	Wake Forest: 392
Michael Campanaro: 1/1, 36 YDS	Brandon Pendergrass: 8 CAR, 25 YDS, TD, LG of 12	Terence Davis: 2 REC, 63 YDS, LG of 44	Boston College: 336

=== Florida State ===
	1	2	3	4	Total
#22 Florida State	7	7	3	13	30
Wake Forest	3	13	9	10	35

30th meeting. 5–23–1 all time. Last meeting 2010, 31–0 Seminoles in Tallahassee.

Passing Leaders	Rushing Leaders	Receiving Leaders	Total Yards
Tanner Price: 21/35, 233 YDS, 3 TD	Josh Harris: 13 CAR, 136 YDS, LG of 57	Chris Givens: 6 REC, 101 YDS, TD, LG of 40	Wake Forest: 391
Michael Campanaro: 1/1, 30 YDS, TD	Brandon Pendergrass: 13 CAR, 44 YDS, LG of 11	Michael Campanaro: 4 REC, 64 YDS, LG of 24	Florida State: 425

=== Virginia Tech ===
	1	2	3	4	Total
#17 Virginia Tech	0	21	7	10	38
Wake Forest	10	0	7	0	17

36th meeting. 11–23–1 all time. Last meeting 2010, 52–21 Hokies in Blacksburg.

Passing Leaders	Rushing Leaders	Receiving Leaders	Total Yards
Tanner Price: 19/33, 254 YDS, 2 TD	Brandon Pendergrass: 21 CAR, 80 YDS, LG of 14	Chris Givens: 7 REC, 140 YDS, TD, LG of 79	Wake Forest: 320
Ted Stachitas: 1/2, 7 YDS	Ted Stachitas: 2 CAR, 7 YDS, LG of 5	Danny Dembry: 3 REC, 41 YDS, LG of 21	Virginia Tech: 473

=== Duke ===
	1	2	3	4	Total
Wake Forest	7	10	0	7	24
Duke	0	3	10	10	23

92nd meeting. 36–53–2 all time. Last meeting 2010, 54–48 Demon Deacons in Winston-Salem.

Passing Leaders	Rushing Leaders	Receiving Leaders	Total Yards
Tanner Price: 15/25, 215 Yards, 2 Touchdowns	Brandon Pendergrass: 15 Carries, 43 Yards, a Touchdown, Long of 11	Chris Givens: 6 REC, 147 Yards, 2 Touchdowns, Long of 66	Wake Forest: 305
	Tanner Price: 9 CAR, 29 YDS, LG of 23	Michael Campanaro: 4 REC, 46 YDS, LG of 18	Duke: 372

=== North Carolina ===
	1	2	3	4	Total
Wake Forest	0	10	7	7	24
North Carolina	14	7	7	21	49

104th meeting. 34–67–2 all time. Last meeting 2007, 37–10 Demon Deacons in Winston-Salem.

Passing Leaders	Rushing Leaders	Receiving Leaders	Total Yards
Tanner Price: 17/29, 146 YDS	Brandon Pendergrass: 13 CAR, 99 YDS, 2 TD, LG of 30	Michael Campanaro: 6 REC, 88 YDS, LG of 41	Wake Forest: 331
Ted Stachitas: 5/7, 64 YDS	Tommy Bohanon: 5 CAR, 17 YDS, TD, LG of 7	Danny Dembry: 5 REC, 56 YDS, LG of 24	North Carolina: 562

=== Notre Dame ===
	1	2	3	4	Total
Notre Dame	10	0	14	0	24
Wake Forest	10	7	0	0	17

1st meeting.

Passing Leaders	Rushing Leaders	Receiving Leaders	Total Yards
Tanner Price: 17/24, 187 YDS, TD	Brandon Pendergrass: 17 CAR, 47 YDS, LG of 14	Michael Campanaro: 6 REC, 74 YDS, LG of 25	Wake Forest: 297
	Chris Givens: 4 CAR, 39 YDS, LG of 11	Chris Givens: 6 REC, 57 YDS, LG of 16	Notre Dame: 341

=== Clemson ===
	1	2	3	4	Total
Wake Forest	7	0	21	0	28
#10 Clemson	7	7	7	10	31

77th meeting. 17–58–1 all time. Last meeting 2010, 30–10 Tigers in Winston-Salem.

Passing Leaders	Rushing Leaders	Receiving Leaders	Total Yards
Tanner Price: 24/37, 172 YDS, TD	Brandon Pendergrass: 20 CAR, 134 YDS, 2 TD, LG of 33	Michael Campanaro: 9 REC, 72 YDS, LG of 17	Wake Forest: 317
	Orville Reynolds: 2 CAR, 10 YDS, LG of 8	Chris Givens: 4 REC, 31 YDS, LG of 13	Clemson: 522

=== Maryland ===
	1	2	3	4	Total
Maryland	0	7	3	0	10
Wake Forest	7	0	10	14	31

60th meeting. 16–42–1 all time. Last meeting 2010, 62–14 Terrapins in College Park.

Passing Leaders	Rushing Leaders	Receiving Leaders	Total Yards
Tanner Price: 20/32, 320 YDS, 3 TD	Brandon Pendergrass: 26 CAR, 125 YDS, TD, LG of 38	Chris Givens: 8 REC, 191 YDS, TD, LG of 64	Wake Forest: 514
	Orville Reynolds: 11 CAR, 63 YDS, LG of 20	Michael Campanaro: 7 REC, 80 YDS, LG of 22	Maryland: 415

=== Vanderbilt ===
	1	2	3	4	Total
Vanderbilt	6	21	7	7	41
Wake Forest	0	7	0	0	7

14th meeting. 6–7 all time. Last meeting 2010, 34–13 Demon Deacons in Nashville.

Passing Leaders	Rushing Leaders	Receiving Leaders	Total Yards
Tanner Price: 16/34, 157 YDS, TD	Brandon Pendergrass: 12 CAR, 74 YDS, LG of 18	Chris Givens: 4 REC, 69 YDS, LG of 28	Wake Forest: 329
Ted Stachitas: 3/4, 26 YDS	Orville Reynolds: 11 CAR, 23 YDS, LG of 13	Michael Campanaro: 6 REC, 45 YDS, LG of 13	Vanderbilt: 481

=== Mississippi State ===
	1	2	3	4	Total
Mississippi State	7	9	0	7	23
Wake Forest	7	0	7	3	17

1st meeting.

Passing Leaders	Rushing Leaders	Receiving Leaders	Total Yards
Tanner Price: 24/46, 214 YDS	Brandon Pendergrass: 24 CAR, 73 YDS, TD, LG of 14	Michael Campanaro: 10 REC, 128 YDS, LG of 32	Wake Forest: 287
Terence Davis: 1/1, 9 YDS	Orville Reynolds: 2 CAR, 8 YDS, LG of 6	Chris Givens: 9 REC, 54 YDS, LG of 12	Mississippi State: 382

== Statistics ==
=== Scores by quarter ===
	1	2	3	4	OT	Total
Wake Forest	81	101	102	54	0	338
Opponents	59	101	79	110	7	356

=== Offense ===
==== Rushing ====
Name	GP	Att	Yards	Avg	TD	Long	Avg/G
Brandon Pendergrass	13	188	823	4.4	9	38	63.3
Josh Harris	9	101	432	4.3	3	57	48.0
Orville Reynolds	5	28	109	3.9	0	20	21.8
Chris Givens	13	14	77	5.5	0	13	5.9
Ted Stachitas	6	8	47	5.9	1	21	7.8
Nick Knott	2	8	35	4.4	1	12	17.5
Tommy Bohanon	13	15	31	2.1	2	7	2.4
Michael Campanaro	12	2	23	11.5	0	18	1.9
Brendan Cross	2	2	11	5.5	0	15	5.5
Tyler Jackson	1	2	5	2.5	0	5	5.0
Danny Dembry	13	3	2	0.7	1	10	0.2
Lovell Jackson	12	1	-9	-9.0	0	0	-0.8
TEAM	10	14	-43	-3.1	0	0	-4.1
Tanner Price	13	78	-53	-0.7	1	23	-4.1
Demon Deacons Total	13	464	1,490	3.2	18	57	114.6
Opponents	13	481	2,208	4.6	21	72	169.8

==== Passing ====
Name	GP	Cmp–Att	Pct	Yds	TD	INT	Lng	Avg/G	RAT
Tanner Price	13	253-422	60.0	3,017	20	6	79	232.1	132.80
Ted Stachitas	6	18-26	69.3	152	0	1	41	25.3	110.65
Michael Campanaro	12	3-4	75.0	106	2	1	40	8.8	412.60
Brendan Cross	2	1-1	100.0	9	0	0	9	4.5	175.60
Terence Davis	13	1-1	100.0	9	0	0	9	0.7	175.60
Alex Wulfeck	13	1-1	100.0	1	0	0	1	0.1	108.40
Chris Givens	13	0-1	0.0	0	0	0	0	0.0	0.00
Patrick Thompson	1	1-1	100.0	-3	0	0	0	-3.0	74.80
Demon Deacons Total	13	278-457	60.8	3,291	22	8	79	253.2	133.71
Opponents	13	254-444	57.2	2,963	22	13	73	227.9	123.76

==== Receiving ====
Name	GP	Rec	Yds	Avg	TD	Long	Avg/G
Chris Givens	13	83	1,330	16.0	9	79	102.3
Michael Campanaro	12	73	833	11.4	2	41	69.4
Danny Dembry	13	36	423	11.8	1	40	32.5
Terence Davis	13	20	269	13.4	5	44	20.7
Brandon Pendergrass	13	19	116	6.1	1	20	8.9
Cameron Ford	13	12	99	8.2	3	21	7.6
Tommy Bohanon	13	9	56	6.2	1	15	4.3
Andrew Parker	12	6	46	7.7	0	15	3.8
Josh Harris	9	5	22	4.4	0	9	2.4
Lovell Jackson	12	4	41	10.2	0	21	3.4
Orville Reynolds	5	4	25	6.2	0	20	5.0
Matt James	8	3	15	5.0	0	6	1.9
Quan Rucker	1	1	9	9.0	0	9	9.0
Tanner Price	13	1	9	9.0	0	9	0.7
Josh Bush	13	1	1	1.0	0	1	0.1
Keenon Rush	1	1	-3	-3.0	0	0	-3.0
Demon Deacons Total	13	278	3,291	11.8	22	79	253.2
Opponents	13	254	2,963	11.7	22	73	227.9

==== Scoring ====
Name	TD	FG	PAT	2PT PAT	SAFETY	TOT PTS
Jimmy Newman		17-22	39-41			90
Brandon Pendergrass	10					60
Chris Givens	9					54
Terence Davis	5					30
Josh Harris	3					18
Cameron Ford	3					18
Tommy Bohanon	3					18
Michael Campanaro	3					18
Danny Dembry	2					12
Nick Knott	1					6
Tanner Price	1					6
Ted Stachitas	1					6
TEAM					1	2
Demon Deacons Total	41	17-22	39-41		1	338
Opponents	43	18-23	40-41	1		356
