= 2011 Virginia Tech Hokies football team =

American college football season

2011 Virginia Tech Hokies football

ACC Coastal Division champion

ACC Championship Game, L 10–38 vs. Clemson

Sugar Bowl, L 20–23 ^{OT} vs. Michigan
- Conference: Atlantic Coast Conference
- Coastal Division

Ranking
- Coaches: No. 17
- AP: No. 21
- Record: 11–3 (7–1 ACC)
- Head coach: Frank Beamer (25th season)
- Offensive coordinator: Bryan Stinespring (10th season)
- Offensive scheme: Pro-style
- Defensive coordinator: Bud Foster (17th season)
- Base defense: 4–4
- Home stadium: Lane Stadium

2011 Atlantic Coast Conference football standings
	Conf.			Overall
Team	W		L	W		L
Atlantic Division
No. 22 Clemson x$	6	–	2	10	–	4
Wake Forest	5	–	3	6	–	7
No. 23 Florida State	5	–	3	9	–	4
NC State	4	–	4	8	–	5
Boston College	3	–	5	4	–	8
Maryland	1	–	7	2	–	10
Coastal Division
No. 21 Virginia Tech x%	7	–	1	11	–	3
Virginia	5	–	3	8	–	5
Georgia Tech	5	–	3	8	–	5
Miami (FL)	3	–	5	6	–	6
North Carolina	3	–	5	7	–	6
Duke	1	–	7	3	–	9
Championship: Clemson 38, Virginia Tech 10
$ – BCS representative as conference champion; % – BCS at-large representative; x – Division champion/co-champions; Rankings from AP Poll

The 2011 Virginia Tech Hokies football team represented the Virginia Polytechnic Institute and State University in the 2011 NCAA Division I FBS football season. The Hokies were led by 25th-year head coach Frank Beamer and played their home games at Lane Stadium. They were members of the Coastal Division of the Atlantic Coast Conference. They finished the season with 11–3 overall record, 7–1 in ACC play, as champions of the Coastal Division. They were defeated by Clemson in the 2011 ACC Championship Game, 10–38. They were invited to the Sugar Bowl, where they lost to Michigan, 20–23 in overtime.

== Schedule ==
Date	Time	Opponent	Rank	Site	TV	Result	Attendance
September 3	12:30 p.m.	No. 2 (FCS) Appalachian State*	No. 13	Lane Stadium; Blacksburg, VA	ACCN	W 66–13	66,233
September 10	3:30 p.m.	at East Carolina*	No. 11	Dowdy–Ficklen Stadium; Greenville, NC	FSN	W 17–10	49,404
September 17	4:00 p.m.	Arkansas State*	No. 13	Lane Stadium; Blacksburg, VA	FSN	W 26–7	66,233
September 24	3:30 p.m.	at Marshall*	No. 13	Joan C. Edwards Stadium; Huntington, WV	CBSSN	W 30–10	34,424
October 1	6:00 p.m.	No. 13 Clemson	No. 11	Lane Stadium; Blacksburg, VA	ESPN2	L 3–23	66,233
October 8	3:30 p.m.	Miami (FL)	No. 21	Lane Stadium; Blacksburg, VA (rivalry)	ABC/ESPN	W 38–35	66,233
October 15	6:30 p.m.	at Wake Forest	No. 19	BB&T Field; Winston-Salem, NC	ESPN3	W 38–17	35,026
October 22	3:00 p.m.	Boston College^{†}	No. 16	Lane Stadium; Blacksburg, VA (rivalry)	FSN	W 30–14	66,233
October 29	12:30 p.m.	at Duke	No. 15	Wallace Wade Stadium; Durham, NC	ACCN	W 14–10	27,392
November 10	8:00 p.m.	at No. 20 Georgia Tech	No. 10	Bobby Dodd Stadium; Atlanta, GA (Battle of the Techs)	ESPN	W 37–26	50,140
November 17	8:00 p.m.	North Carolina	No. 9	Lane Stadium; Blacksburg, VA	ESPN	W 24–21	66,233
November 26	3:30 p.m.	at No. 24 Virginia	No. 6	Scott Stadium; Charlottesville, VA (Commonwealth Cup)	ABC/ESPN2	W 38–0	61,124
December 3	8:00 p.m.	vs. No. 21 Clemson	No. 5	Bank of America Stadium; Charlotte, NC (ACC Championship Game)	ESPN	L 10–38	73,675
January 3, 2012	8:30 p.m.	vs. No. 13 Michigan*	No. 17	Mercedes-Benz Superdome; New Orleans, LA (Sugar Bowl) (College GameDay)	ESPN	L 20–23 ^{OT}	64,512
*Non-conference game; ^{†}Homecoming; Rankings from AP Poll released prior to the game; All times are in Eastern time

== Rankings ==
Ranking movements Legend: ██ Increase in ranking ██ Decrease in ranking
	Week															
Poll	Pre	1	2	3	4	5	6	7	8	9	10	11	12	13	14	Final
AP	13	11	13	13	11	21	19	16	15	12	10	9	6	5	17	21
Coaches	13	11	12	11	10	17	17	14	15	11	9	7	4	3	11	17
Harris	Not released						18	16	15	12	10	9	5	4	11	Not released
BCS	Not released							12	12	12	10	8	5	5	11	Not released

== Coaching staff ==
2011 Virginia Tech Hokies coaching staff

Head coach

- Frank Beamer

Assistant coaches

- Shane Beamer – associate head coach and running backs coach
- Bryan Stinespring – offensive coordinator and tight ends/offensive tackles coach
- Bud Foster – defensive coordinator and inside linebackers coach
- Curt Newsome – offensive guards and center coach
- Kevin Sherman – wide receivers coach
- Mike O'Cain – quarterbacks coach
- Torrian Gray – defensive secondary coach
- Charley Wiles – defensive line coach
- Cornell Brown – outside linebackers and assistant defensive line coach
- John Ballein – associate athletics director for football operations
- Billy Hite – assistant to the head coach and senior advisor
- Jim Cavanaugh – director of recruiting and high school relations

== Roster ==
2011 Virginia Tech Hokies roster
Wide receiver: David Mellstrom – Freshman; 7 Marcus Davis – (redshirt) Junior; 11 Dyrell Roberts – Senior; 19 Danny Coale – (redshirt) Senior; 31 Demitri Knowles – Freshman; 82 Willie Byrn – (redshirt) Freshman; Kevin Asante – Freshman; Christian Reeves – Freshman; 18 D.J. Coles – Junior; 81 Jarrett Boykin – Senior; 83 Corey Fuller – (redshirt) Junior; 85 E.L. Smiling – (redshirt) Freshman; Center: 63 Bo Gentry – Senior; 74 Andrew Miller – (redshirt) Sophomore; 79 Caleb Farris – Freshman; Offensive guard: Tyler Barfield – (redshirt) Sophomore; Jake Goins – Freshman; Andrew Harrs – Freshman; 59 Courtney Prince – (redshirt) Junior; 60 Laurence Gibson – (redshirt) Freshman; 64 Matt Arkema – (redshirt) Freshman; 68 Jaymes Brooks – (redshirt) Senior; 70 Kory Gough – (redshirt) Freshman; 75 Greg Nosal – (redshirt) Senior; 76 David Wang – (redshirt) Sophomore; 77 Dale Davis – (redshirt) Freshman; Offensive tackle: Brent Benedict – (redshirt) Freshman; Darian Fisher – (redshirt) Sophomore; Marcus Mapp – Freshman; 54 Nick Becton – (redshirt) Junior; 61 Nick Acree – (redshirt) Freshman; 62 Blake DeChristopher – (redshirt) Senior; 67 Michael Via – (redshirt) Junior; 69 Mark Shuman – (redshirt) Freshman; 71 Vinston Painter – (redshirt) Junior; 72 Andrew Lanier – (redshirt) Senior; Tight end: Fuller Hoepner – (redshirt) Freshman; Darius Redman – Freshman; 13 Randall Dunn – (redshirt) Junior; 33 Chris Drager – (redshirt) Senior; 80 George George – (redshirt) Junior; 86 Eric Martin – (redshirt) Sophomore; 88 Ryan Malleck – Freshman	Quarterback: Brian Rody – Freshman; T.J. Shaw – Freshman; 3 Logan Thomas – (redshirt) Sophomore; 6 Mark Leal – (redshirt) Freshman; 12 Joseph Clayton – (redshirt) Junior; 16 Trey Gresh – (redshirt) Freshman; Tailback: Michael Holmes – Freshman; Maurice Taylor – Freshman; 2 Josh Oglesby – (redshirt) Senior; 4 David Wilson – Junior; 14 Dominique Patterson – '' (redshirt) Freshman; 22 Tony Gregory – (redshirt) Sophomore; 39 Daniel Dyer – '' (redshirt) Freshman; Fullback: Greg Gadell – (redshirt) Freshman; Justus Hoffmann – Freshman; 25 Martin Scales – (redshirt) Junior; 32 Riley Beiro – (redshirt) Freshman; 45 Joey Phillips – (redshirt) Junior; Defensive tackle: Kwamaine Battle – (redshirt) Senior; Ross Ward – Freshman; 53 Dwight Tucker – (redshirt) Junior; 56 Antoine Hopkins – (redshirt) Junior; 92 Luther Maddy – Freshman; 93 Isaiah Hamlette – (redshirt) Junior; 96 Corey Marshall – Freshman; 97 Kris Harley – Freshman; 98 Derrick Hopkins – Sophomore; Defensive end: Matt Roth – Freshman; 42 J.R. Collins – (redshirt) Sophomore; 66 Tyrel Wilson – (redshirt) Sophomore; 87 Justin Taylor – Freshman; 90 Duan Perez-Means – (redshirt) Freshman; 94 Dadi Nicolas – Freshman; 95 Zach McCray – (redshirt) Freshman; 99 James Gayle – (redshirt) Sophomore	Cornerback: Chris Caver – Freshman; James Farrow – Freshman; Michael Dennis II - Senior; Carl Jackson – (redshirt) Freshman; 8 Detrick Bonner – (redshirt) Freshman; 9 Cris Hill – (redshirt) Sophomore; 17 Kyle Fuller – Sophomore; 20 Jayron Hosley – Junior; 34 Kyshoen Jarrett – Freshman; Linebacker: Griffin Hite – Freshman; Brandon Spitzer – Freshman; D.J. Ward – Freshman; 24 Tariq Edwards – (redshirt) Sophomore; 36 Chase Williams – '' (redshirt) Freshman; 44 Brian Laiti – (redshirt) Freshman; 47 Jonathan Halfhide – (redshirt) Freshman; 51 Bruce Taylor – (redshirt) Junior; 52 Barquell Rivers – (redshirt) Senior; 57 Telvion Clark – (redshirt) Sophomore; 58 Jack Tyler – (redshirt) Sophomore; Outside linebacker: 27 Nick Dew – (redshirt) Freshman; 28 Alonzo Tweedy – (redshirt) Junior; 40 Wiley Brown – (redshirt) Junior; 43 Jeron Gouveia-Winslow – (redshirt) Junior; Free safety: Michael Cole – Freshman; Scott Rolin – Freshman; 1 Antone Exum – (redshirt) Sophomore; 21 Theron Norman – (redshirt) Freshman; 26 James Hopper – (redshirt) Sophomore; 37 Ronny Vandyke – Freshman; 41 Derek DiNardo – (redshirt) Freshman; Strong Safety: Nick Bush – Freshman; Ryan Cassidy – Freshman; Josh Trimble – Freshman; 15 Eddie Whitley – Senior; 23 Boye Aromire – Freshman; Long snapper: Lukas Stump – (redshirt) Freshman; 50 Collin Carroll – (redshirt) Senior; 65 Joe St. Germain – (redshirt) Freshman; Punter: Ethan Keyserling – (redshirt) Freshman; 29 Scott Demler – (redshirt) Junior; 38 Michael Branthover – Freshman; Place kicker: Conor Goulding – (redshirt) Freshman; 5 Tyler Weiss – (redshirt) Senior; 48 Justin Myer – Senior; 89 Cody Journell – Freshman

== Game summaries ==
=== Virginia ===
Team	1	2	3	4	Total
• Virginia Tech	7	7	7	17	38
Virginia	0	0	0	0	0

- Date: November 26
- Location: Scott Stadium, Charlottesville, VA
- Game start: 3:30 p.m. EST
- TV announcers (ABC/ESPN2): Joe Tessitore, Rod Gilmore, Lisa Salters

Scoring summary
1	8:46	VT	Logan Thomas 14 yard run (Cody Journell kick)	VT 7-0
2	11:36	VT	Jarrett Boykin 16 yard pass from Logan Thomas (Cody Journell kick)	VT 14-0
3	10:45	VT	David Wilson 27 yard run (Cody Journell kick)	VT 21-0
4	13:54	VT	David Wilson 38 yard run (Cody Journell kick)	VT 28-0
4	11:28	VT	Marcus Davis 7 yard pass from Logan Thomas (Cody Journell kick)	VT 35-0
4	6:45	VT	Cody Journell 40 yard field goal	VT 38-0
