= 2011 Duke Blue Devils football team =

American college football season

2011 Duke Blue Devils football
- Conference: Atlantic Coast Conference
- Coastal Division
- Record: 3–9 (1–7 ACC)
- Head coach: David Cutcliffe (4th season)
- Offensive coordinator: Kurt Roper (4th season)
- Offensive scheme: Multiple
- Defensive coordinator: Jim Knowles (2nd season)
- Base defense: Multiple
- MVP: Matt Daniels
- Captains: Matt Daniels; Charlie Hatcher; Kyle Hill; Sean Renfree
- Home stadium: Wallace Wade Stadium

2011 Atlantic Coast Conference football standings
	Conf.			Overall
Team	W		L	W		L
Atlantic Division
No. 22 Clemson x$	6	–	2	10	–	4
Wake Forest	5	–	3	6	–	7
No. 23 Florida State	5	–	3	9	–	4
NC State	4	–	4	8	–	5
Boston College	3	–	5	4	–	8
Maryland	1	–	7	2	–	10
Coastal Division
No. 21 Virginia Tech x%	7	–	1	11	–	3
Virginia	5	–	3	8	–	5
Georgia Tech	5	–	3	8	–	5
Miami (FL)	3	–	5	6	–	6
North Carolina	3	–	5	7	–	6
Duke	1	–	7	3	–	9
Championship: Clemson 38, Virginia Tech 10
$ – BCS representative as conference champion; % – BCS at-large representative; x – Division champion/co-champions; Rankings from AP Poll

The 2011 Duke Blue Devils football team represented Duke University in the 2011 NCAA Division I FBS football season as a member of the Atlantic Coast Conference (ACC) in the Coastal Division. The Blue Devils were led by fourth-year head coach David Cutcliffe and played their home games at Wallace Wade Stadium. Duke finished the season 3–9 overall and 1–7 in ACC play to place last in the Coastal Division.

== Schedule ==
Date	Time	Opponent	Site	TV	Result	Attendance
September 3	7:00 pm	No. 16 (FCS) Richmond*	Wallace Wade Stadium; Durham, NC	ESPN3	L 21–23	32,741
September 10	3:30 pm	No. 6 Stanford*	Wallace Wade Stadium; Durham, NC	ESPNU	L 14–44	24,785
September 17	12:30 pm	at Boston College	Alumni Stadium; Chestnut Hill, MA	ACCN	W 20–19	35,812
September 24	3:30 pm	Tulane*^{†}	Wallace Wade Stadium; Durham, NC	ESPN3	W 48–27	20,138
October 1	7:00 pm	at FIU*	FIU Stadium; Miami, FL	ESPNU	W 31–27	22,682
October 15	3:00 pm	Florida State	Wallace Wade Stadium; Durham, NC	FSN	L 16–41	24,687
October 22	12:30 pm	Wake Forest	Wallace Wade Stadium; Durham, NC (rivalry)	ACCN	L 23–24	22,258
October 29	12:30 pm	No. 15 Virginia Tech	Wallace Wade Stadium; Durham, NC	ACCN	L 10–14	27,392
November 5	3:00 pm	at Miami (FL)	Sun Life Stadium; Miami Gardens, FL	FSN	L 14–49	62,053
November 12	3:00 pm	at Virginia	Scott Stadium; Charlottesville, VA	FSN	L 21–31	45,733
November 19	12:30 pm	No. 23 Georgia Tech	Wallace Wade Stadium; Durham, NC	ACCN	L 31–38	18,747
November 26	3:30 pm	at North Carolina	Kenan Memorial Stadium; Chapel Hill, NC (Victory Bell)	FSN	L 21–37	58,500
*Non-conference game; ^{†}Homecoming; Rankings from Coaches Poll released prior to the game; All times are in Eastern time

== Game summaries ==
=== Richmond ===
Week One: Richmond Spiders at Duke Blue Devils

Quarter	1	2	3	4	Total
Spiders	0	10	7	6	23
Blue Devils	0	7	14	0	21

at Wallace Wade Stadium, Durham, North Carolina

- Date: September 3, 2011
- Game time: 7:00 p.m. EDT
- Game attendance: 32,741
- TV announcers (ESPN3): Neil Solondz, Jay Taylor

Game information

First quarter

- No scoring

Second quarter

- RICHMOND – Stephen Barnette 6-yard TD pass from Aaron Corp (Remington Hinshaw kick), 14:56
- DUKE – Desmond Scott 29-yard TD run (Will Snyderwine kick), 12:57
- RICHMOND – Remington Hinshaw 29-yard field goal, 4:18

Third quarter

- DUKE – Brandon Connette 6-yard TD run (Will Snyderwine kick), 8:23
- RICHMOND – Kendall Gaskins 8-yard TD run (Remington Hinshaw kick), 5:15
- DUKE – Anthony Boone 3-yard TD run (Will Snyderwine kick), 0:39

Fourth quarter

- RICHMOND – Garrett Turner 1-yard TD run (PAT failed), 10:12

Top passers

- RICHMOND – Aaron Corp – 14/31, 193 yards, 1 TD, 1 INT
- DUKE – Sean Renfree – 23/33, 201 yards, 0 TD, 0 INT

Top rushers

- RICHMOND – Kendall Gaskins – 67 yards, 1 TD
- DUKE – Juwan Thompson – 86 yards

Top receivers

- RICHMOND – Tre Gray – 129 yards
- DUKE – Conner Vernon – 78 yards

Despite high expectations, Duke lost to FCS opponent Richmond for the third time in six seasons. Down by 2, the Blue Devils missed a 28-yard field goal to take the lead with less than 2 minutes left in the game.

=== Stanford ===
Week Two: #6 Stanford Cardinal at Duke Blue Devils

Quarter	1	2	3	4	Total
#6 Cardinal	7	10	13	14	44
Blue Devils	0	7	0	7	14

at Wallace Wade Stadium, Durham, North Carolina

- Date: September 10, 2011
- Game time: 3:30 p.m. EDT
- Game attendance: 24,785
- TV announcers (ESPNU): Clay Matvick, Brian Griese, Allison Williams

Game information

First quarter

- STANFORD – Coby Fleener 3-yard pass from Andrew Luck (Jordan Williamson kick), 10:01

Second quarter

- STANFORD – Jordan Williamson 40-yard field goal, 12:01
- DUKE – Lee Butler 76-yard interception return (Will Snyderwine kick), 2:14
- STANFORD – Chris Owusu 10-yard pass from Andrew Luck (Jordan Williamson kick), 0:39

Third quarter

- STANFORD – Coby Fleener 60-yard pass from Andrew Luck (Jordan Williamson kick), 6:41
- STANFORD – Jeremy Stewart 30-yard run (Pat failed), 4:06

Fourth quarter

- STANFORD – Zach Ertz 3-yard pass from Andrew Luck (Jordan Williamson kick), 14:56
- STANFORD – Tyler Gaffney 1-yard run (Jordan Williamson kick), 8:00
- DUKE – Anthony Boone 2-yard run (Jeffrey Ijjas kick), 0:57

Top passers

- STANFORD – Andrew Luck – 20/28, 290 yards, 4 TD, 1 INT
- DUKE – Sean Renfree – 19/27, 179 yards, 0 TD, 0 INT

Top rushers

- STANFORD – Stepfan Taylor – 75 yards
- DUKE – Juwan Thompson – 43 yards

Top receivers

- STANFORD – Chris Owusu – 106 yards, 1 TD
- DUKE – Conner Vernon – 98 yards

Although the Blue Devils kept the first half close, Stanford opened up the game in the second half. The last win for Duke against a top-10 nonconference game was against Stanford in 1971.

=== Boston College ===
Week Three: Duke Blue Devils at Boston College Eagles

Quarter	1	2	3	4	Total
Blue Devils	0	14	0	6	20
Eagles	7	12	0	0	19

at Alumni Stadium, Chestnut Hill, Massachusetts

- Date: September 17, 2011
- Game time: 12:30 p.m. EDT
- Game attendance: 35,812
- TV announcers (ACC Network): Steve Martin, Dave Archer

Game information

First quarter

- BC – Tahj Kimble 31-yard pass from Chase Rettig (Nate Freese kick), 5:57

Second quarter

- BC – Nate Freese 43-yard field goal, 10:44
- DUKE – Conner Vernon 53-yard pass from Sean Renfree (Jeffrey Ijjas kick), 8:31
- BC – Nate Freese 47-yard field goal, 4:03
- BC – Andre Williams 7-yard run (Pat failed), 1:21
- DUKE – Conner Vernon 21-yard pass from Sean Renfree (Jeffrey Ijjas kick), 0:30

Third quarter

- No scoring

Fourth quarter

- DUKE – Sean Renfree 1-yard run (Two-Point conversion failed), 9:57

Top passers

- DUKE – Sean Renfree – 41/53, 368 yards, 2 TD, 1 INT
- BC – Chase Rettig – 17/33, 247 yards, 1 TD, 0 INT

Top rushers

- DUKE – Juwan Thompson – 54 yards
- BC – Andre Williams – 56 yards, 1 TD

Top receivers

- DUKE – Conner Vernon – 116 yards, 2 TD
- BC – Larmond – 87 yards

In its conference opener, Duke broke through for its first win of the season. Sean Renfree set a Duke record with 41 completions, and BC missed a go-ahead 23-yard field goal with 43 seconds left in the game.

=== Tulane ===
Week Four: Tulane Green Wave at Duke Blue Devils

Quarter	1	2	3	4	Total
Green Wave	7	3	3	14	27
Blue Devils	21	10	14	3	48

at Wallace Wade Stadium, Durham, North Carolina

- Date: September 24, 2011
- Game time: 3:30 p.m. EDT
- Game attendance: 20,138
- TV announcers (ESPN3): Neil Solondz, Je'Rod Cherry

Game information

First quarter

- DUKE – Juwan Thompson 1-yard run (Will Snyderwine kick), 11:25
- TULANE – Ryan Travis 23-yard interception return (Cairo Santos kick), 8:22
- DUKE – Juwan Thompson 20-yard run (Will Snyderwine kick), 7:27
- DUKE – Conner Vernon recovered fumble in end zone (Will Snyderwine kick), 2:45

Second quarter

- TULANE – Cairo Santos 20-yard field goal, 14:24
- DUKE – Will Snyderwine 40-yard field goal, 11:23
- DUKE – Sean Renfree 2-yard run (Will Snyderwine kick), 1:33

Third quarter

- DUKE – Jay Hollingsworth 3-yard run (Jeffrey Ijjas kick), 10:22
- TULANE – Cairo Santos 49-yard field goal, 8:17
- DUKE – Sean Renfree 7-yard run (Jeffrey Ijjas kick), 1:57

Fourth quarter

- DUKE – Jeffrey Ijjas 26-yard field goal, 13:19
- TULANE – Brock Sanders 2-yard pass from Ryan Griffin (Cairo Santos kick), 10:37
- TULANE – Robert Kelley 7-yard run (Cairo Santos kick), 2:09

Top passers

- TULANE – Ryan Griffin – 14/29, 188 yards, 1 TD, 1 INT
- DUKE – Sean Renfree – 21/30, 278 yards, 1 TD, 1 INT

Top rushers

- TULANE – Brandon LeBeau – 26 yards
- DUKE – Juwan Thompson – 69 yards, 2 TD

Top receivers

- TULANE – Justyn Shackleford – 59 yards
- DUKE – Conner Vernon – 96 yards, 1 TD

Following up on a win at BC, Duke scored 5 rushing touchdowns to defeat Tulane by 21 points. Duke's offense was not forced to punt until the fourth quarter.

=== FIU ===
Week Five: Duke Blue Devils at Florida International Golden Panthers

Quarter	1	2	3	4	Total
Blue Devils	17	0	0	14	31
Golden Panthers	14	3	3	7	27

at FIU Stadium, Miami, Florida

- Date: October 1, 2011
- Game time: 6:00 p.m. EDT
- Game attendance: 22,682
- TV announcers (ESPN3): Rob Stone, Danny Kanell

Game information

First quarter

- DUKE – Will Snyderwine 27-yard field goal, 9:29
- FIU – T.Y. Hilton 63-yard pass from Wesley Carroll (Jack Griffin kick), 9:10
- DUKE – Conner Vernon 26-yard pass from Sean Renfree (Will Snyderwine kick), 6:46
- FIU – Jonathan Faucher 15-yard pass from Wesley Carroll (Jack Griffin kick), 3:13
- DUKE – Cooper Helfet 22-yard pass from Sean Renfree (Will Snyderwine kick), 0:53

Second quarter

- FIU – Jack Griffin 36-yard field goal, 4:01

Third quarter

- FIU – Jack Griffin 33-yard field goal, 0:12

Fourth quarter

- FIU – Wayne Times 34-yard pass from Wesley Carroll (Jack Griffin kick), 13:30
- DUKE – Juwan Thompson 6-yard run (Will Snyderwine kick), 11:56
- DUKE – Juwan Thompson 9-yard run (Will Snyderwine kick), 6:52

Top passers

- DUKE – Sean Renfree – 28/43, 335 yards, 2 TD, 0 INT
- FIU – Wesley Carroll – 25/39, 348 yards, 3 TD, 0 INT

Top rushers

- DUKE – Juwan Thompson – 30 yards, 2 TD
- FIU – Darriet Perry – 102 yards

Top receivers

- DUKE – Conner Vernon – 117 yards, 1 TD
- FIU – T.Y. Hilton – 102 yards, 1 TD

Duke won its 3rd game in a row by overcoming a 10-point deficit in the fourth quarter and not committing any turnovers. Conner Vernon and Donovan Varner both had over 100 yards receiving.

=== Florida State ===
Week Six: Florida State Seminoles at Duke Blue Devils

Quarter	1	2	3	4	Total
#23 Seminoles	17	10	7	7	41
Blue Devils	3	0	0	13	16

at Wallace Wade Stadium, Durham, North Carolina

- Date: October 15, 2011
- Game time: 3:00 p.m. EDT
- TV announcers (FSN): Rich Waltz, Keith Jones, Jenn Hildreth

Game information

First quarter
Second quarter
Third quarter
Fourth quarter

Top passers

- FSU–
- DUKE–

Top rushers

- FSU–
- DUKE–

Top receivers

- FSU–
- DUKE–

Top tacklers

- FSU–
- DUKE–

=== Wake Forest ===
Week Seven: Wake Forest Demon Deacons at Duke Blue Devils

Quarter	1	2	3	4	Total
Demon Deacons	7	10	0	7	24
Blue Devils	0	3	10	10	23

at Wallace Wade Stadium, Durham, North Carolina

- Date: October 22, 2011
- Game time: 12:30 p.m.
- Game attendance: 22,258
- TV announcers (ACC Network): Steve Martin, Dave Archer, Scott Pryzwansky

Game information

First quarter
Second quarter
Third quarter
Fourth quarter

Top passers

- WF–
- DUKE–

Top rushers

- WF–
- DUKE–

Top receivers

- WF–
- DUKE–

Top tacklers

- WF–
- DUKE–

=== Virginia Tech ===
Week Eight: Virginia Tech Hokies at Duke Blue Devils

Quarter	1	2	3	4	Total
#15 Hokies	7	7	0	0	14
Blue Devils	0	7	3	0	10

at Wallace Wade Stadium, Durham, North Carolina

- Date: October 29, 2011
- Game time: 12:30 p.m.
- Game attendance: 27,392
- TV announcers (ACC Network): Tim Brant, Dave Archer, Scott Pryzwansky

Game information

First quarter
Second quarter
Third quarter
Fourth quarter

Top passers

- VT–
- DUKE–

Top rushers

- VT–
- DUKE–

Top receivers

- VT–
- DUKE–

Top tacklers

- VT–
- DUKE–

=== Miami (FL) ===
Week Nine: Duke Blue Devils at Miami Hurricanes

Quarter	1	2	3	4	Total
Blue Devils	0	7	7	0	14
Hurricanes	14	14	7	14	49

at Sun Life Stadium, Miami Gardens, Florida

- Date: November 5, 2011
- Game time: 3:00 p.m.
- TV announcers (FSN Affiliates): Rich Waltz, Keith Jones, Jenn Hildreth

Game information

First quarter
Second quarter
Third quarter
Fourth quarter

Top passers

- DUKE–
- MIAMI–

Top rushers

- DUKE–
- MIAMI–

Top receivers

- DUKE–
- MIAMI–

Top tacklers

- DUKE–
- MIAMI–

=== Virginia ===
Week Ten: Duke Blue Devils at Virginia Cavaliers

Quarter	1	2	3	4	Total
Blue Devils	0	14	7	0	21
Cavaliers	7	7	17	0	31

at Scott Stadium, Charlottesville, Virginia

- Date: November 12, 2011
- Game time: 3:00
- TV announcers (ACC Network): Rich Waltz, Keith Jones, Jenn Hildreth

Game information

First quarter
Second quarter
Third quarter
Fourth quarter

Top passers

- DUKE–
- UVA–

Top rushers

- DUKE–
- UVA–

Top receivers

- DUKE–
- UVA–

Top tacklers

- DUKE–
- UVA–

=== Georgia Tech ===
Week Eleven: Georgia Tech Yellow Jackets at Duke Blue Devils

Quarter	1	2	3	4	Total
Yellow Jackets	14	14	3	7	38
Blue Devils	7	7	3	14	31

at Wallace Wade Stadium, Durham, North Carolina

- Date: November 19, 2011
- Game time: 12:30 p.m. Eastern Standard Time
- TV announcers (ACC Network): Tim Brant, Dave Archer, Mike Hogewood

Game information

First quarter
Second quarter
Third quarter
Fourth quarter

Top passers

- GT–
- DUKE–

Top rushers

- GT–
- DUKE–

Top receivers

- GT–
- DUKE–

Top tacklers

- GT–
- DUKE–

=== North Carolina ===
Week Twelve: Duke Blue Devils at North Carolina Tar Heels

Quarter	1	2	3	4	Total
Blue Devils	7	7	7	0	21
Tar Heels	10	10	10	7	37

at Kenan Memorial Stadium, Chapel Hill, North Carolina

- Date: November 26, 2011
- Game time: 3:30 p.m. Eastern Standard Time
- TV announcers (ACC Network): Rich Waltz, Keith Jones, Jenn Hildreth

Game information

First quarter
Second quarter
Third quarter
Fourth quarter

Top passers

- DUKE–
- UNC–

Top rushers

- DUKE–
- UNC–

Top receivers

- DUKE–
- UNC–

Top tacklers

- DUKE–
- UNC–

== Roster ==
2011 Duke Blue Devils Roster
Quarterbacks: 7 Anthony Boone – (redshirt) Freshman; 12 Sean Schroeder – (redshirt) Sophomore; 15 Mackenzie Sovereign – Freshman; 16 Robert Collins – Freshman; 18 Brandon Connette – Sophomore; 19 Sean Renfree – (redshirt) Junior; Running backs: 9 Josh Snead – Sophomore; 23 Juwan Thompson – Sophomore; 27 Jay Hollingsworth – Senior; 30 Greg DeLuca – Junior; 33 Desmond Scott – Junior; 43 Patrick Kurunwune – (redshirt) Junior; Centers: 62 Matt Skura – Freshman; 68 Brian Moore – (redshirt) Junior; 75 Travis Gibson – Junior; 76 Conor Irwin – (redshirt) Junior; Offensive guards: 63 Robert Shofner – Sophomore; 65 Cody Robinson – Freshman; 67 Lucas Patrick – Freshman; 70 John Coleman – (redshirt) Sophomore; 71 John Needham – (redshirt) Senior; 74 Dave Harding – (redshirt) Sophomore; 77 Laken Tomlinson – (redshirt) Freshman; Offensive tackles: 64 Joey Finison – (redshirt) Sophomore; 69 Teddy Force – Junior; 72 Perry Simmons – (redshirt) Sophomore; 73 Takoby Cofield – (redshirt) Freshman; 79 Kyle Hill – (redshirt) Senior; Offensive linemen: 51 William Perrott – Freshman; 52 Marcus Aprahamian – Freshman; 66 Carson Ginn – Freshman; Tight ends: 44 Jack Farrell – (redshirt) Sophomore; 80 David Reeves – Freshman; 81 Cooper Helfet – Senior; 83 Connor Peters – Freshman; 85 Ryan Hall – (redshirt) Sophomore; 88 Danny Parker – (redshirt) Senior; 89 Braxton Deaver – (redshirt) Freshman	Wide receivers: 2 Conner Vernon – Junior; 3 Jamison Crowder – Freshman; 5 Brandon Braxton – Sophomore; 8 Blair Holliday – Freshman; 10 Nick Hill – Freshman; 13 William Johnston – Sophomore; 14 Corey Gattis – (redshirt) Sophomore; 17 Tyree Watkins – (redshirt) Sophomore; 25 Georgie Kerber – Junior; 26 Donovan Varner – Senior; 37 Brandon Watkins – Sophomore; 86 Eric Adams – Freshman; 87 Jack Wise – Freshman; Nose guards: 57 Will Bryant – (redshirt) Freshman; 60 Steven Ingram – (redshirt) Freshman; 93 Charlie Hatcher – (redshirt) Senior; Defensive tackles: 58 Curtis Hazelton – (redshirt) Junior; 61 Will Boeckman – Sophomore; 82 Sydney Sarmiento – (redshirt) Sophomore; 91 Jamal Bruce – (redshirt) Freshman; Down linemen: 55 Lucas Fisher – Freshman; 63 Anthony Schepis – Freshman; Defensive ends: 42 Dezmond Johnson – (redshirt) Freshman; 84 Kenny Anunike – (redshirt) Junior; 90 Mario Sanders – Freshman; 92 Justin Foxx – (redshirt) Sophomore; 94 Jordan DeWalt-Ondijo – (redshirt) Freshman; 95 Jamal Wallace – (redshirt) Freshman; 97 Nick Sink – (redshirt) Freshman; 99 Sam Marshall – Freshman	Linebackers: 22 Britton Grier – Freshman; 28 Kevin Rojas – (redshirt) Sophomore; 34 Ned Smith – Junior; 34 Jonathan Woodruff – Freshman; 45 Austin Gamble – Junior; 47 David Helton – Freshman; 50 Tyree Glover – Junior; 50 Emmanuel Watkins – Freshman; 53 Chris Hoover – Freshman; 54 C.J. France – (redshirt) Freshman; 56 Kyler Brown – Freshman; 59 Kelby Brown – Sophomore; Defensive backs: 39 Jacques Bristow – Freshman; Cornerbacks: 1 Zach Greene – Junior; 6 Ross Cockrell – (redshirt) Sophomore; 11 Tim Burton – Freshman; 24 Garett Patterson – (redshirt) Sophomore; 25 Quan Stevenson – (redshirt) Freshman; 29 Lex Butler – (redshirt) Sophomore; 30 Jared Boyd – Freshman; 31 Tony Foster – (redshirt) Junior; 37 Johnny Williams – Senior; Safeties: 4 Walt Canty – Junior; 15 Taylor Sowell – (redshirt) Sophomore; 16 Chris Tavarez – Freshman; 20 Lee Butler – Senior; 21 Anthony Young-Wiseman – (redshirt) Sophomore; 32 August Campbell – (redshirt) Sophomore; 35 Jeffrey Faris – Senior; 38 Jordon Byas – (redshirt) Junior; 40 Matt Daniels – Senior; 46 Garrett Rider – Sophomore; 49 Brendan Fowler – Sophomore; 49 Anthony Pecoraro – Sophomore; Kickers: 39 Andrew Bailey – Sophomore; 96 Will Snyderwine – (redshirt) Senior; 98 Paul Asack – (redshirt) Junior; Punters: 11 Spencer Rogers – Sophomore; 36 Alex King – Senior; 41 Will Monday – Freshman; Long snappers: 78 Jackson Anderson – (redshirt) Junior
Source: 2011 Duke Roster from GoDuke.com,

== Coaching staff ==
2011 Duke Blue Devils coaches
- David Cutcliffe– Head coach
- Ron Middleton – Associate head coach, Special Teams, Tight Ends
- Kurt Roper – Offensive coordinator, quarterbacks
- Matt Luke – Offensive coordinator, running backs, offensive line
- Jim Knowles – Defensive coordinator
- Matt Lubick– Passing game coordinator, recruiting coordinator, wide receivers
- Jim Collins – Assistant defensive coordinator, linebackers
- Zac Roper – Assistant coach: running backs, special teams
- Derek Jones – Assistant coach: defensive backs
- Rick Petri – Assistant coach: defensive line

Source: 2011 Duke Coaches from GoDuke.com,
