= 2011 Pittsburgh Panthers football team =

American college football season

2011 Pittsburgh Panthers football

BBVA Compass Bowl, L 6–28 vs. SMU
- Conference: Big East Conference
- Record: 6–7 (4–3 Big East)
- Head coach: Todd Graham (1st season; regular season); Keith Patterson (interim, bowl game)
- Co-offensive coordinators: Calvin Magee (1st season); Mike Norvell (1st season)
- Offensive scheme: Multiple no huddle
- Defensive coordinator: Keith Patterson (1st season)
- Co-defensive coordinator: Paul Randolph (1st season)
- Base defense: 3–3–5
- Home stadium: Heinz Field

2011 Big East Conference football standings
	Conf.			Overall
Team	W		L	W		L
No. 17 West Virginia $+	5	–	2	10	–	3
No. 25 Cincinnati +	5	–	2	10	–	3
Louisville +	5	–	2	7	–	6
Rutgers	4	–	3	9	–	4
Pittsburgh	4	–	3	6	–	7
Connecticut	3	–	4	5	–	7
South Florida	1	–	6	5	–	7
Syracuse	1	–	6	5	–	7
$ – BCS representative as conference champion; + – Conference co-champions; As of January 11, 2012; Rankings from AP Poll

The 2011 Pittsburgh Panthers football team represented the University of Pittsburgh in the 2011 NCAA Division I FBS football season. The Panthers were led through the regular season by first-year head coach Todd Graham and played eight home games at Heinz Field. Defensive coordinator Keith Patterson was named interim coach for the season-ending bowl game after Graham resigned in favor of a head coaching position at Arizona State.

== Schedule ==
Date	Time	Opponent	Site	TV	Result	Attendance
September 3	6:00 p.m.	Buffalo*	Heinz Field; Pittsburgh, PA	ESPN3	W 35–16	48,359
September 10	1:00 p.m.	Maine*	Heinz Field; Pittsburgh, PA	ESPN3	W 35–29	41,230
September 17	12:00 p.m.	at Iowa*	Kinnick Stadium; Iowa City, IA	ESPN2	L 27–31	70,585
September 24	12:00 p.m.	Notre Dame*	Heinz Field; Pittsburgh, PA (rivalry)	ABC	L 12–15	65,050
September 29	8:00 p.m.	No. 14 South Florida	Heinz Field; Pittsburgh, PA	ESPN	W 44–17	40,025
October 8	3:30 p.m.	at Rutgers	High Point Solutions Stadium; Piscataway, NJ	ESPNU	L 10–34	46,079
October 15	12:00 p.m.	Utah*^{†}	Heinz Field; Pittsburgh, PA	ESPNU	L 14–26	43,719
October 26	8:00 p.m.	Connecticut	Heinz Field; Pittsburgh, PA	ESPN	W 35–20	40,219
November 5	7:00 p.m.	No. 22 Cincinnati	Heinz Field; Pittsburgh, PA (River City Rivalry)	ESPNU	L 23–26	49,362
November 12	12:00 p.m.	at Louisville	Papa John's Cardinal Stadium; Louisville, KY	ESPN+	W 21–14	51,321
November 25	7:00 p.m.	at West Virginia	Mountaineer Field; Morgantown, WV (Backyard Brawl)	ESPN	L 20–21	60,932
December 3	12:00 p.m.	Syracuse	Heinz Field; Pittsburgh, PA (rivalry)	ESPN2	W 33–20	40,058
January 7	1:00 p.m.	vs. SMU*	Legion Field; Birmingham, AL (BBVA Compass Bowl)	ESPN	L 6–28	29,726
*Non-conference game; ^{†}Homecoming; Rankings from AP Poll released prior to the game; All times are in Eastern time

== Spring game ==
Pitt concluded its spring practices under new coach Todd Graham and showcased its new offensive and defensive schemes to the public for the first time in its annual Blue-Gold game on April 16, 2011 at Heinz Field. Despite cold and rainy weather, the offense completed 81 passes and threw for 498 yards. The Blue team, which was composed of first-team players, ran 100 plays in two hours en route to a 48–13 victory over the Gold team which was composed of reserve players. The opening kickoff was returned 87 yard for a touchdown by defensive back Buddy Jackson. Quarterback Tino Sunseri completed 35 of 55 passes for 416 yards and two scores while having one interception and a fumble. Linebacker Carl Fleming had a game-high 12 tackles and two sacks and the defense forced five total turnovers. Kevin Harper completed a 52-yard field goal. The Ed Conway Award, which is give to the most improved players of the spring, went to Buddy Jackson, Anthony Gonzalez, and Tyrone Ezell.

== Coaching staff ==
2011 Pittsburgh Panthers football staff
Coaching staff: Todd Graham – Head coach; Paul Randolph – Executive Associate head coach/co-defensive coordinator/defensive line; Calvin Magee – Assistant head coach/co-offensive coordinator/running backs; Mike Norvell – Co-offensive coordinator/wide receivers/Director of Recruiting; Keith Patterson – Defensive coordinator/linebackers; Tony Gibson – Pass Defense coordinator/secondary; Tony Dews – Tight ends/recruiting coordinator; Todd Dodge – Quarterbacks; Spencer Leftwich – Offensive line; Randall McCray – Outside linebackers/special teams	Support staff: Blair Philbrick – Assistant Athletic Director/football operations; Alex Hodge – Video director; Bob Junko – Director of Football Relations and Program Enhancement; Bo Graham – Head graduate assistant/Assistant Receivers coach; Matt Caponi – Defensive graduate assistant	Strength and conditioning staff: Shawn Griswold – Director of strength and conditioning; Trevor Dieleman – Assistant strength and conditioning coach; Travis Pelletier – Assistant strength and conditioning coach

Following the conclusion of the regular season, coaches Tony Dews, Tony Gibson, and Calvin Magee left to take positions with Rich Rodriguez's staff at Arizona and did not coach in the BBVA Compass Bowl.

=== Roster ===
2011 Pittsburgh Panthers football roster
Quarterback: 8 – Anthony Gonzalez – (redshirt) freshman (6'3, 230); 10 – Trey Anderson – freshman (6'0, 195); 11 – Mark Myers – (redshirt) freshman (6'4, 230); 12 – Tino Sunseri – (redshirt) junior (6'2, 215); Running back: 1 – Ray Graham – junior (5'9, 195); 2 – Corey Davis – freshman (5'11, 180); 4 – Zach Brown – (redshirt) senior (5'10, 198); 7 – Malcolm Crockett – freshman (5'10, 205); 24 – Desmond Brown – junior (5'9, 200); 29 – Steve Williams – freshman (6'2, 200); 34 – Isaac Bennett – freshman (5'11, 210); Wide receiver: 3 – Darius Patton – freshman (5'10, 173); 5 – Cameron Saddler – (redshirt) junior (5'7, 170); 14 – Ronald Jones – freshman (5'8, 170); 15 – Devin Street – (redshirt) sophomore (6'4, 195); 16 – Brendon Felder – sophomore (5'10, 190); 17 – Salath Williams – (redshirt) freshman (6'3, 195); 19 – Joshua Brinson – junior (6'1, 162); 36 – Brett Zuck – (redshirt) freshman (6'1, 195); 82 – Justin Jackson – freshman (6'3, 185); 84 – Ed Tinker – (redshirt) sophomore (6'2, 195); 87 – Mike Shanahan – (redshirt) junior (6'5, 225); 88 – Kevin Weatherspoon – (redshirt) freshman (5'10, 175); Placekicker: 39 – Kevin Harper – (redshirt) junior (5'10, 180); 49 – Garrett Tonio – (redshirt) Seenior (5'10, 195); 48 – Drake Greer – (redshirt) freshman (6'4, 205); 90 – Chris Yankoski – (redshirt) senior (5'10, 200); Punter: 92 – Matt Yoklic – (redshirt) sophomore (6'4, 220)	Tight end: 6 – Drew Carswell – (redshirt) freshman (6'4, 220); 80 – Brendan Carozzoni – (redshirt) freshman (6'4, 230); 81 – Justin Virbitsky – (redshirt) junior (6'4, 280); 83 – Hubie Graham – (redshirt) junior (6'4, 230); 86 – Sam Collura – freshman, (6'4, 250); Fullback: 31 – Randy Morris – (redshirt) freshman (5'11, 205); 37 – Derrick Burns – (redshirt) freshman (5'11, 235); 47 – Kris Wildman – (redshirt) junior (6'0, 210); 48 – Chris Mike – (redshirt) junior (6'1, 240); Offensive lineman: 52 – Lucas Nix – senior (6'6, 310); 54 – Chris Jacobson – (redshirt) senior (6'3, 295); 55 – Tom Ricketts – (redshirt) freshman (6'5, 268); 56 – Arthur Doakes – (redshirt) freshman (6'6, 340); 57 – Artie Rowell – freshman (6'2, 310); 60 – Greg Gaskins – (redshirt) senior (6'4, 295); 64 – Shane Johnson – (redshirt) freshman (6'5, 330); 68 – Jordan Gibbs – (redshirt) senior (6'7, 315); 70 – Juantez Hollins – (redshirt) sophomore (6'5, 330); 74 – Matt Rotheram – (redshirt) freshman (6'6, 335); 75 – Ryan Turnley – (redshirt) junior (6'6, 320); 76 – Ryan Schlieper – (redshirt) sophomore (6'5, 310); 77 – Zenel Demhasaj – junior (6'7, 331); 78 – Cory King – (redshirt) sophomore (6'6, 325); Defensive lineman: 5 – Ejuan Price – freshman (6'0, 255); 7 – Brandon Lindsey – (redshirt) senior (6'2, 250); 8 – Todd Thomas – (redshirt) freshman (6'2, 230); 45 – Shayne Hale – (redshirt) junior (6'4, 255); 90 – T. J. Clemmings – sophomore (6'6, 315); 96 – Justin Hargrove – (redshirt) senior (6'4, 270); 72 – Jack Lippert – (redshirt) sophomore (6'4, 260); 91 – Tyrone Ezell – (redshirt) sophomore (6'4, 305); 92 – Devin Cook – freshman (6'4, 240); 93 – Bryan Murphy – sophomore (6'3, 255); 94 – Myles Caragein – (redshirt) senior (6'2, 290); 95 – Khaynin Mosley-Smith – freshman (6'0, 305); 97 – Aaron Donald – sophomore (6'0, 285); 98 – Chas Alecxih – (redshirt) senior (6'5, 285)	Linebacker: 3 – Nicholas Grigsby – freshman (6'1, 220); 10 – LaQuentin Smith – freshman (6'2, 280); 28 – Emanuel Rackard – (redshirt) sophomore (6'0, 235); 32 – Tristan Roberts – (redshirt) senior (6'1, 230); 34 – Carl Fleming – (redshirt) sophomore (6'1, 220); 36 – Manny Williams – (redshirt) junior (6'1, 225); 38 – Greg Williams – (redshirt) senior (6'3, 240); 40 – Dan Mason – (redshirt) sophomore (6'1, 230); 43 – Mark Giubilato – (redshirt) freshman (6'2, 235); 44 – Shane Gordon – (redshirt) sophomore (6'0, 240); 49 – Eric Williams – (redshirt) freshman (6'3, 215); 51 – Adam Lazenga – (redshirt) freshman (6'0, 245); 53 – Joe Trebitz – (redshirt) junior (6'3, 220); 55 – Max Gruder – (redshirt) senior (6'2, 230); Defensive back: 2 – K'Waun Williams – sophomore (5'10, 195); 6 – Roderick Ryles – freshman (6'1, 206); 9 – Ray Vinopal – sophomore (5'10, 200); 11 – Marco Pecora – (redshirt) junior (5'11, 195); 12 – Jeremiah Davis – (redshirt) junior (5'10, 175); 16 – Saheed Imoru – senior (5'10, 185); 18 – Jarred Holley – (redshirt) junior (5'10, 190); 20 – Brandon Ifill – (redshirt) freshman (6'1, 200); 21 – Buddy Jackson – (redshirt) senior (6'1, 180); 22 – Antwuan Reed – senior (5'10, 190); 23 – Lafayette Pitts – freshman (5'11, 195); 24 – Cullen Christian – sophomore (6'0, 195); 25 – Jason Hendricks – (redshirt) sophomore (6'0, 190); 26 – Jason Frimpong – freshman (5'11, 180); 27 – Lloyd Carrington – freshman (6'0, 195); 28 – Phil Peckich – (redshirt) freshman (5'10, 185); 35 – E.J. Banks – (redshirt) sophomore (5'11, 190); 41 – Andrew Taglianetti – (redshirt) junior (5'11, 190); 46 – Joseph Lopez – (redshirt) freshman (5'9, 170); Long snappers: 58 – Kevin Barthelemy – (redshirt) sophomore (6'3, 245)
Source and player details, 2011 Pittsburgh Panthers football roster (10/1/2022):

== After the season ==
Less than one year from his hiring, on the evening of December 13, Graham informed athletic director Steve Pederson that he had discussed coaching opportunity at Arizona State. After being informed he did not have permission to talk to the school about the job and refusing conversations with Pederson and another administrator, Graham resigned the next morning to accept the head coaching job at Arizona State University. Graham informed his Pitt players of his departure by having text message forwarded to the team by director of football operations Blair Philbrick. Keith Patterson was named as the interim head coach for the BBVA Compass Bowl.

On December 22, 2011, Wisconsin offensive coordinator Paul Chryst was introduced as the next permanent head coach to take over the Panthers following the BBVA Compass Bowl.

== Awards ==
- Sophomore defensive lineman Aaron Donald was named a second team All-American by FoxSportsNext.com.
- Ray Graham, despite missing the final four games of the season with an injury, and Jarred Holley received first-team All-Big East recognition. Chas Alecxih, Aaron Donald, Max Gruder, and Antwuan Reed received second team honors.
