= 2011 Big East Conference football season =

- League: NCAA Division I FBS (Football Bowl Subdivision)
- Sport: football
- Duration: September 1 - present
- Teams: 8
- TV partner: ESPN-Big East Network

2012 NFL Draft
- Top draft pick: Bruce Irvin (West Virginia)
- Picked by: Seattle Seahawks, 15th overall

Regular season
- Co-Champions: West Virginia, Cincinnati, & Louisville

Football seasons
- ← 2010 2012 →

2011 Big East Conference football standings
	Conf.			Overall
Team	W		L	W		L
No. 17 West Virginia $+	5	–	2	10	–	3
No. 25 Cincinnati +	5	–	2	10	–	3
Louisville +	5	–	2	7	–	6
Rutgers	4	–	3	9	–	4
Pittsburgh	4	–	3	6	–	7
Connecticut	3	–	4	5	–	7
South Florida	1	–	6	5	–	7
Syracuse	1	–	6	5	–	7
$ – BCS representative as conference champion; + – Conference co-champions; As of January 11, 2012; Rankings from AP Poll

The 2011 Big East football season was the NCAA football season of the Big East Conference.

The conference consists of 8 football members: Cincinnati, Connecticut, Louisville, Pittsburgh, Rutgers, South Florida, Syracuse, and West Virginia.

== Regular season ==
=== Key ===
Index to colors and formatting
Big East member won
Big East member lost
Big East Conference Game
Big East teams in **bold**

All times Eastern time.

=== Week 1 ===
Date	Time	Visiting team	Home team	Site	TV	Result	Attendance	Ref.
September 1*	6:00 p.m.	Murray State	**Louisville**	Papa John's Cardinal Stadium • Louisville, KY	ESPNU	**W** 21–9	46,157	
September 1*	7:30 p.m.	North Carolina Central	**Rutgers**	High Point Solutions Stadium • Piscataway, NJ	ESPN3	**W** 48–0	40,061	
September 1*	8:00 p.m.	Wake Forest	**Syracuse**	Carrier Dome • Syracuse, NY	ESPN3	**W** 36–29 ^{OT}	40,833	
September 3*	12:00 p.m.	Fordham	**Connecticut**	Rentschler Field • East Hartford, CT	ESPN3	**W** 35–3	34,562	
September 3*	3:30pm	**South Florida**	No. 16 Notre Dame	Notre Dame Stadium • Notre Dame, IN	NBC	**W** 23–20	80,795	
September 3*	6:00 p.m.	Buffalo	**Pittsburgh**	Heinz Field • Pittsburgh, PA	ESPN3	**W** 35–16	48,359	
September 3*	7:00 p.m.	Austin Peay	**Cincinnati**	Nippert Stadium • Cincinnati, OH	FSO	**W** 72–10	23,282	
September 4*	3:30pm	Marshall	No. 24 **West Virginia**	Mountaineer Field • Morgantown, WV (Friends of Coal Bowl)	ESPN	**W** 34–13	60,758	
^{#}Rankings from AP Poll released prior to game.

=== Week 2 ===
Date	Time	Visiting team	Home team	Site	TV	Result	Attendance	Ref.
September 9*	8:00 p.m.	Florida International	**Louisville**	Papa John's Cardinal Stadium • Louisville, KY	ESPN	**L** 17–24	47,228	
September 10*	12:30 p.m.	**Rutgers**	North Carolina	Kenan Memorial Stadium • Chapel Hill, NC	ACC Network	**L** 22–24	53,000	
September 10*	1:00 p.m.	Maine	**Pittsburgh**	Heinz Field • Pittsburgh, PA	ESPN3	**W** 35–29	41,230	
September 10*	1:00pm	Norfolk State	No. 19 **West Virginia**	Mountaineer Field • Morgantown, WV	ESPN+	**W** 55–12	51,911	
September 10*	3:30 p.m.	**Cincinnati**	Tennessee	Neyland Stadium • Knoxville, TN	ESPN2	**L** 23–45	94,207	
September 10*	4:30 p.m.	Rhode Island	**Syracuse**	Carrier Dome • Syracuse, NY	TWC Sports	**W** 21–14	36,421	
September 10*	7:00pm	Ball State	No. 22 **South Florida**	Raymond James Stadium • Tampa, FL	BHSN	**W** 37–7	45,113	
September 10*	7:30 p.m.	**Connecticut**	Vanderbilt	Vanderbilt Stadium • Nashville, TN	SNY	**L** 21–24	32,119	
^{#}Rankings from AP Poll released prior to game.

=== Week 3 ===
Date	Time	Visiting team	Home team	Site	TV	Result	Attendance	Ref.
September 16*	8:00 p.m.	Iowa State	**Connecticut**	Rentschler Field • East Hartford, CT	ESPN2	**L** 20–24	37,195	
September 17*	12:00 p.m.	**Pittsburgh**	Iowa	Kinnick Stadium • Iowa City, IA	ESPN2	**L** 27–31	70,585	
September 17*	12:00pm	No. 18 **West Virginia**	Maryland	Byrd Stadium • College Park, MD	ESPNU	**W** 37–31	53,627	
September 17*	3:30 p.m.	Akron	**Cincinnati**	Nippert Stadium • Cincinnati, OH	ESPN3	**W** 59–14	24,991	
September 17*	7:00 p.m.	**Louisville**	Kentucky	Commonwealth Stadium • Lexington, KY (Governor's Cup)	ESPNU	**W** 24–17	68,170	
September 17*	7:00pm	Florida A&M	No. 20 **South Florida**	Raymond James Stadium • Tampa, FL	BHSN	**W** 70–17	50,128	
September 17*	8:00 p.m.	**Syracuse**	USC	Los Angeles Memorial Coliseum • Los Angeles, CA	FX	**L** 17–38	65,873	
^{#}Rankings from AP Poll released prior to game.

=== Week 4 ===
Date	Time	Visiting team	Home team	Site	TV	Result	Attendance	Ref.
September 22*	8:00 p.m.	NC State	**Cincinnati**	Nippert Stadium • Cincinnati, OH	ESPN/ESPN 3D	**W** 44–14	28,431	
September 24*	12:00 p.m.	Notre Dame	**Pittsburgh**	Heinz Field • Pittsburgh, PA	ABC	**L** 12–15	65,050	
September 24*	12:00 p.m.	Toledo	**Syracuse**	Carrier Dome • Syracuse, NY	BIG EAST Network	**W** 33–30 ^{OT}	39,116	
September 24*	2:00 p.m.	Ohio	**Rutgers**	High Point Solutions Stadium • Piscataway, NJ	ESPN3	**W** 38–26	41,388	
September 24*	6:00 p.m.	**Connecticut**	Buffalo	University at Buffalo Stadium • Buffalo, NY	SNY/BIG EAST Network	**W** 17–3	18,215	
September 24*	7:00pm	UTEP	No. 17 **South Florida**	Raymond James Stadium • Tampa, FL	ESPN3	**W** 52–24	48,231	
September 24*	8:00pm	No. 2 LSU	No. 16 **West Virginia**	Mountaineer Field • Morgantown, WV (Gold Rush)	ABC	**L** 21–47	62,056	
^{#}Rankings from AP Poll released prior to game.

=== Week 5 ===
Date	Time	Visiting team	Home team	Site	TV	Result	Attendance	Ref.
September 29	8:00pm	No. 14 **South Florida**	**Pittsburgh**	Heinz Field • Pittsburgh, PA	ESPN	**PIT** 44-17	40,025	
October 1	12:00 p.m.	**Rutgers**	**Syracuse**	Carrier Dome • Syracuse, NY	BIG EAST Network	**RUT** 19-16 ^{2OT}	42,152	
October 1*	1:00 p.m.	**Cincinnati**	Miami (OH)	Yager Stadium • Oxford, OH (Victory Bell)	ESPN3	**W** 27–0	16,408	
October 1*	3:30 p.m.	Marshall	**Louisville**	Papa John's Cardinal Stadium • Louisville, KY	BIG EAST Network	**L** 13–17	53,267	
October 1*	3:30pm	Bowling Green	No. 22 **West Virginia**	Mountaineer Field • Morgantown, WV	ESPN+	**W** 55–10	46,603	
October 1*	3:30 p.m.	Western Michigan	**Connecticut**	Rentschler Field • East Hartford, CT	SNY	**L** 31–38	36,648	
^{#}Rankings from AP Poll released prior to game.

=== Week 6 ===
Date	Time	Visiting team	Home team	Site	TV	Result	Attendance	Ref.
October 8	12:00 p.m.	**Connecticut**	No. 16 **West Virginia**	Mountaineer Field • Morgantown, WV	SNY/BIG EAST Network	**WVA** 43-16	56,179	
October 8*	12:00 p.m.	**Louisville**	North Carolina	Kenan Memorial Stadium • Chapel Hill, NC	ESPN2	**L** 7–14	51,500	
October 8	3:30 p.m.	**Pittsburgh**	**Rutgers**	High Point Solutions Stadium • Piscataway, NJ	ESPNU	**RUT** 34-10	46,079	
October 8*	8:00 p.m.	**Syracuse**	Tulane	Louisiana Superdome • New Orleans, LA	Cox	**W** 37–34	39,116	
^{#}Rankings from AP Poll released prior to game.

=== Week 7 ===
Date	Time	Visiting team	Home team	Site	TV	Result	Attendance	Ref.
October 15	12:00 p.m.	**Louisville**	**Cincinnati**	Paul Brown Stadium • Cincinnati, OH (Keg of Nails)	BIG EAST Network	**CIN** 25-16	40,971	
October 15*	12:00 p.m.	Utah	**Pittsburgh**	Heinz Field • Pittsburgh, PA	ESPNU	**L** 14–26	43,719	
October 15*	2:00 p.m.	Navy	**Rutgers**	High Point Solutions Stadium • Piscataway, NJ	ESPN3	**W** 21–20	47,138	
October 15	3:30pm	**South Florida**	**Connecticut**	Rentschler Field • East Hartford, CT	BIG EAST Network	**CON** 16-10	37,162	
^{#}Rankings from AP Poll released prior to game.

=== Week 8 ===
Date	Time	Visiting team	Home team	Site	TV	Result	Attendance	Ref.
October 21	8:00 p.m.	**Rutgers**	**Louisville**	Papa John's Cardinal Stadium • Louisville, KY	ESPN2	**LOU** 16-14	48,435	
October 21	8:00pm	No. 11 **West Virginia**	**Syracuse**	Carrier Dome • Syracuse, NY	ESPN	**SYR** 49-23	45,265	
October 22	12:00pm	**Cincinnati**	**South Florida**	Raymond James Stadium • Tampa, FL	BIG EAST Network	**CIN** 37-34	39,456	
^{#}Rankings from AP Poll released prior to game.

=== Week 9 ===
Date	Time	Visiting team	Home team	Site	TV	Result	Attendance	Ref.
October 26	8:00 p.m.	**Connecticut**	**Pittsburgh**	Heinz Field • Pittsburgh, PA	ESPN	**PIT** 35-20	40,219	
October 29	12:00 p.m.	**Syracuse**	**Louisville**	Papa John's Cardinal Stadium • Louisville, KY	BIG EAST Network	**LOU** 27-10	44,817	
October 29	3:30 p.m.	No. 24 **West Virginia**	**Rutgers**	High Point Solutions Stadium • Piscataway, NJ	ABC	**WVA** 41-31	47,303	
^{#}Rankings from AP Poll released prior to game.

=== Week 10 ===
Date	Time	Visiting team	Home team	Site	TV	Result	Attendance	Ref.
November 5	12:00pm	**Louisville**	No. 24 **West Virginia**	Mountaineer Field • Morgantown, WV	ESPN+	**LOU** 38–35	57,287	
November 5	12:00 p.m.	**Syracuse**	**Connecticut**	Rentschler Field • East Hartford, CT	ESPNU	**CON** 28-21	38,769	
November 5	7:00 p.m.	No. 23 **Cincinnati**	**Pittsburgh**	Heinz Field • Pittsburgh, PA (River City Rivalry)	ESPNU	**CIN** 26-23	49,362	
November 5	7:00pm	**South Florida**	**Rutgers**	High Point Solutions Stadium • Piscataway, NJ	ESPN3	**RUT** 20–17 ^{OT}	36,911	
^{#}Rankings from AP Poll released prior to game.

=== Week 11 ===
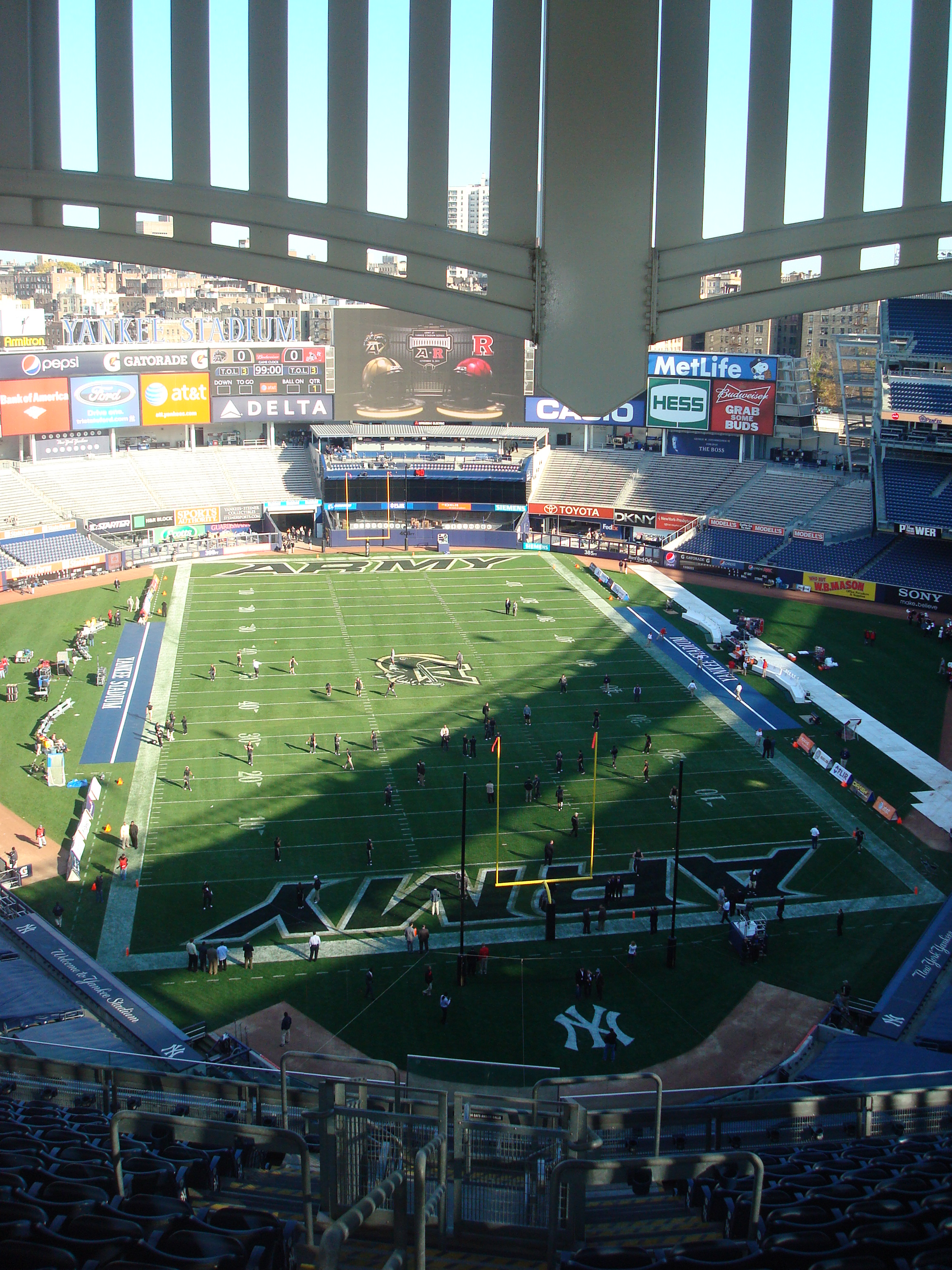
Yankee Stadium for a game between Army and Rutgers.

Date	Time	Visiting team	Home team	Site	TV	Result	Attendance	Ref.
November 11	8:00 p.m.	**South Florida**	**Syracuse**	Carrier Dome • Syracuse, NY	ESPN2	**USF** 37-17	41,582	
November 12	12:00 p.m.	**Pittsburgh**	**Louisville**	Papa John's Cardinal Stadium • Louisville, KY	BIG EAST Network	**PIT** 21-14	51,321	
November 12	12:00 p.m.	**West Virginia**	No. 23 **Cincinnati**	Paul Brown Stadium • Cincinnati, OH	ABC	**WVA** 24-21	48,152	
November 12*	3:30 p.m.	**Rutgers**	Army	Yankee Stadium • Bronx, NY	CBS SN	**W** 27–12	30,028	
^{#}Rankings from AP Poll released prior to game.

=== Week 12 ===
Date	Time	Visiting team	Home team	Site	TV	Result	Attendance	Ref.
November 19	12:00 p.m.	**Cincinnati**	**Rutgers**	High Point Solutions Stadium • Piscataway, NJ	ESPNU	**RUT** 20-3	52,454	
November 19	12:00 p.m.	**Louisville**	**Connecticut**	Rentschler Field • East Hartford, CT	BIG EAST Network	**LOU** 34-20	34,483	
November 19*	3:30pm	Miami (FL)	**South Florida**	Raymond James Stadium • Tampa, FL	ESPNU	**L** 3–6	47,745	
^{#}Rankings from AP Poll released prior to game.

=== Week 13 ===
Date	Time	Visiting team	Home team	Site	TV	Result	Attendance	Ref.
November 25	11:00am	**Louisville**	**South Florida**	Raymond James Stadium • Tampa, FL	ESPN2	**LOU** 34–24	46,666	
November 25	7:00 p.m.	**Pittsburgh**	**West Virginia**	Mountaineer Field • Morgantown, WV (Backyard Brawl)	ESPN	**WVA** 21–20	60,932	
November 26	12:00 p.m.	**Cincinnati**	**Syracuse**	Carrier Dome • Syracuse, NY	BIG EAST Network	**CIN** 30-13	38,159	
November 26	12:00 p.m.	**Rutgers**	**Connecticut**	Rentschler Field • East Hartford, CT	ESPN2	**CON** 40-22	37,857	
^{#}Rankings from AP Poll released prior to game.

=== Week 14 ===
Date	Time	Visiting team	Home team	Site	TV	Result	Attendance	Ref.
December 1	8:00pm	No. 20 **West Virginia**	**South Florida**	Raymond James Stadium • Tampa, FL	ESPN	**WVA** 30-27	41,743	
December 3	12:00 p.m.	**Connecticut**	No. 25 **Cincinnati**	Nippert Stadium • Cincinnati, OH	ESPN	**CIN** 35-27	27,930	
December 3	12:00 p.m.	**Syracuse**	**Pittsburgh**	Heinz Field • Pittsburgh, PA	ESPN2	**PIT** 33-20	40,058	
^{#}Rankings from AP Poll released prior to game.

== Bowl Games ==
Date	Time	Visiting team	Home team	Site	TV	Result	Attendance	Ref.
December 27*	8:00 p.m.	Louisville	North Carolina State	Bank of America Stadium • Charlotte, NC (Belk Bowl)	ESPN	L 24–31	58,427	
December 30*	3:20 p.m.	Iowa State	Rutgers	Yankee Stadium • Bronx, NY (Pinstripe Bowl)	ESPN	W 27–13	38,328	
December 31*	3:30 p.m.	No. 25 Cincinnati	Vanderbilt	Liberty Bowl Memorial Stadium • Memphis, TN (Liberty Bowl)	ABC	W 31–24	57,103	
January 4*	8:30pm	No. 23 West Virginia	No. 14 Clemson	Sun Life Stadium • Miami, FL (Orange Bowl)	ESPN	W 70–33	67,563	
January 7*	1:00 p.m.	Pittsburgh	SMU	Legion Field • Birmingham, AL (BBVA Compass Bowl)	ESPN	L 6–28	29,726	
^{#}Rankings from AP Poll released prior to game.

== Records against other conferences ==
Conference	Wins	Losses
ACC	4	4
Big 12	1	1
Big Ten	0	1
CUSA	3	2
Independents	3	1
MAC	9	1
Mountain West	0	0
Pac-12	0	2
SEC	2	3
Sun Belt	0	1
WAC	0	0
All FCS	5	0
Against BCS	7	10
Against FBS	22	16
Overall	27	16

== Big East Conference Awards ==
The following individuals received postseason honors as voted by the Big East Conference football coaches.

2011 Big East Football Individual Awards
Award	Recipient(s)
Offensive Player of the Year	Isaiah Pead, RB, Cincinnati
Defensive Player of the Year	Derek Wolfe, DT, Cincinnati Khaseem Greene, LB, Rutgers
Special Teams Player of the Year	Tavon Austin, WR, West Virginia
Rookie of the Year	Teddy Bridgewater, QB, Louisville
Coach of the Year	Butch Jones, Cincinnati

2011 All-Big East Conference Football Teams
First Team		Second Team	
Offense	Defense	Offense	Defense
WR – Mohamed Sanu, Rutgers; WR – Tavon Austin, West Virginia; OT – Justin Pugh, Syracuse; OT – Don Barclay, West Virginia; OG – Randy Martinez, Cincinnati; OG – Art Forst, Rutgers; OG – Andrew Tiller, Syracuse; C – Moe Petrus, Connecticut; TE – Nick Provo, Syracuse; QB – Geno Smith, West Virginia; RB – Isaiah Pead, Cincinnati; RB – Ray Graham, Pittsburgh; RB – Antwon Bailey, Syracuse; K – Dave Teggart, Connecticut; RS – Tavon Austin, West Virginia	DL – Derek Wolfe, Cincinnati; DL – Kendall Reyes, Connecticut; DL – Chandler Jones, Syracuse; DL – Bruce Irvin, West Virginia; LB – J. K. Schaffer, Cincinnati; LB – Khaseem Greene, Rutgers; LB – Najee Goode, West Virginia; CB – Adrian Bushell, Louisville; CB – Keith Tandy, West Virginia; S – Drew Frey, Cincinnati; S – Hakeem Smith, Louisville; S – Jarred Holley, Pittsburgh; S – Duron Harmon, Rutgers; P – Pat O'Donnell, Cincinnati	WR – Alec Lemon, Syracuse; WR – Stedman Bailey, West Virginia; OT – Alex Hoffman, Cincinnati; OT – Mike Ryan, Connecticut; OG – Desmond Wynn, Rutgers; OG – Jeremiah Warren, USF; C – Joe Madsen, West Virginia; QB – Zach Collaros, Cincinnati; TE – Ryan Griffin, Connecticut; RB – Lyle McCombs, Connecticut; RB – Darrell Scott, USF; K – Maikon Bonani, USF; RS – Jeremy Deering, Rutgers	DL – Trevardo Williams, Connecticut; DL – Chas Alecxih, Pittsburgh; DL – Aaron Donald, Pittsburgh; DL – Ryne Giddins, USF; LB – Dexter Heyman, Louisville; LB – Max Gruder, Pittsburgh; LB – Marquis Spruill, Syracuse; CB – Dwayne Gratz, Connecticut; CB – Antwuan Reed, Pittsburgh; CB – Logan Ryan, Rutgers; CB – Kayvon Webster, USF; S – Jerrell Young, USF; S – Eain Smith, West Virginia; P – Cole Wagner, Connecticut; P – Justin Doerner, Rutgers
^{†} - denotes unanimous selection Additional players added to the All-Big East teams due to ties in the voting
