= 2011 Belk Bowl =

Louisville Cardinals	NC State Wolfpack
(7–5)	(7–5)
Big East	ACC
24	31
Head coach: Charlie Strong	Head coach: Tom O'Brien
	1	2	3	4	Total
Louisville	7	3	7	7	24
NC State	7	14	10	0	31
- Date: December 27, 2011
- Season: 2011
- Stadium: Bank of America Stadium
- Location: Charlotte, North Carolina
- MVP: Mike Glennon
- Favorite: NC State by 1
- Referee: Bill Athan (WAC)
- Attendance: 58,427
- Payout: US$1 million per team

United States TV coverage
- Network: ESPN
- Announcers: Bob Wischusen (Play-by-Play); Brian Griese (Analyst); Shannon Spake (Sidelines)
- Nielsen ratings: 2.22

The 2011 Belk Bowl, the 10th edition of the game, was a post-season American college football bowl game, held on December 27, 2011, at Bank of America Stadium in Charlotte, North Carolina as part of the 2011–12 NCAA Bowl season.

The game was telecast at 8:00 p.m. ET on ESPN, and featured the Louisville Cardinals from the Big East Conference and the NC State Wolfpack from the Atlantic Coast Conference.

Previously known as the Meineke Car Care Bowl in 2010, the 2011 contest was the first under its new name and sponsorship agreement with Belk, the Charlotte-based department store chain.

== Teams ==
=== Louisville ===
Louisville advanced to its second straight Bowl game under second year head coach Charlie Strong. It is the first time the Cardinals have advanced to back-to-back bowl games since 2005–06, their first two years as members of the Big East. Louisville enters the game with a record of 7–5, and having gone 5–2 in Big East play. The Cardinals experienced an up-and-down season. They started out 1–1 before going on the road and beating their hated in-state rival Kentucky 24–17 for the first time in 4 tries, in a game where highly touted freshman quarterback Teddy Bridgewater made his debut, filling in midway through for the injured Will Stein. Louisville lost three straight to drop to 2–4, before winning three straight to go to 5–4. One notable event occurred midway through the Cards' 16–14 win over Rutgers, in which senior cornerback Anthony Conner broke his neck and was carted off the field. Louisville became Bowl-eligible on November 19, in a 34–20 win at Connecticut.

== Scoring summary ==
Scoring Play	Score
1st Quarter
NCS – T. J. Graham 6 Yd Pass From Mike Glennon (Niklas Sade Kick), 5:39	NCS 7–0
UL – Teddy Bridgewater 8 Yd Run (Chris Philpott Kick), 1:06	Tie 7–7
2nd Quarter
UL – Chris Philpott 32 Yd Field Goal, 6:07	UL 10–7
NCS – Tobais Palmer 35 Yd Pass From Mike Glennon (Niklas Sade Kick), 4:03	NCS 14–10
NCS – T. J. Graham 68 Yd Pass From Mike Glennon (Niklas Sade Kick), 1:35	NCS 21–10
3rd Quarter
NCS – Niklas Sade 34 Yd Field Goal, 8:04	NCS 24–10
NCS – David Amerson 65 Yd Interception Return (Niklas Sade Kick), 6:39	NCS 31–10
UL – Nate Nord 2 Yd Pass From Teddy Bridgewater (Chris Philpott Kick), 2:00	NCS 31–17
4th Quarter
UL – Josh Bellamy 2 Yd Pass From Teddy Bridgewater (Chris Philpott Kick), 3:55	NCS 31–24

=== Statistics ===
Statistics	UL	NC State
First downs	18	19
Rushes-yards (net)	35–117	28–65
Passing yards (net)	274	264
Att-Comp-Int	43–24–3	33–21–1
Total yards	391	329
Time of Possession	31:50	28:10
