= Doug Marrone =

American football player and coach (born 1964)

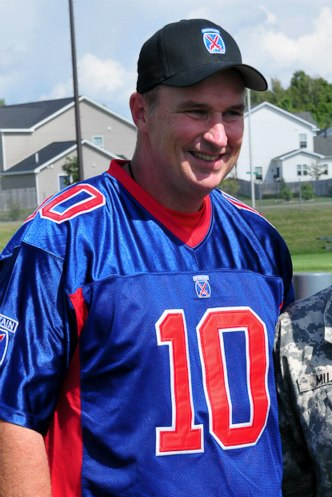
- Marrone in 2012

New England Patriots
- Title: Offensive line coach

Personal information
- Born: July 25, 1964 (age 62); The Bronx, New York, U.S.
- Listed height: 6 ft 5 in (1.96 m)
- Listed weight: 269 lb (122 kg)

Career information
- Position: Offensive tackle (No. 78, 75)
- High school: Bronx (NY) Herbert H. Lehman
- College: Syracuse (1983–1985)
- NFL draft: 1986: 6th round, 164th overall pick

Career history

Playing
- Los Angeles Raiders (1986)*; Miami Dolphins (1987); Dallas Cowboys (1989)*; New Orleans Saints (1989); Minnesota Vikings (1990)*; Pittsburgh Steelers (1991)*; London Monarchs (1991–1992)
- * Offseason or practice squad member only

Coaching
- Cortland State (1992) Tight ends coach; Coast Guard (1993) Offensive line coach; Northeastern (1994) Offensive line coach; Georgia Tech (1996–1999); Tight ends coach (1996); Offensive line coach (1997–1999); Georgia (2000) Offensive line coach; Tennessee (2001) Tight ends coach & offensive tackles coach; New York Jets (2002–2005) Offensive line coach; New Orleans Saints (2006–2008) Offensive coordinator & offensive line coach; Syracuse (2009–2012) Head coach; Buffalo Bills (2013–2014) Head coach; Jacksonville Jaguars (2015–2020); Assistant head coach & offensive line coach (2015–2016); Interim head coach (2016); Head coach (2017–2020); Alabama (2021) Offensive line coach; New Orleans Saints (2022–2023) Offensive line coach; New England Patriots (2025–present) Offensive line coach

Operations
- Georgia Tech (1995) Director of football operations; Boston College (2024) Senior analyst for football strategy/research

Awards and highlights
- 1 Big East (2012); Second-team All-East (1983)

Career NFL statistics
- Games played: 5
- Games started: 0
- Stats at Pro Football Reference

Head coaching record
- Regular season: 38–60 (.388)
- Postseason: 2–1 (.667)
- Career: NCAA: 25–25 (.500); NFL: 40–61 (.396)
- Coaching profile at Pro Football Reference

Douglas Charles Marrone (born July 25, 1964) is an American professional football coach and former offensive tackle. He is currently the offensive line coach for the New England Patriots of the National Football League (NFL). He played in the NFL for the Miami Dolphins and New Orleans Saints. He came to prominence as the head coach at Syracuse from 2009 to 2012, where he previously played college football. Marrone also served as the head coach of the NFL's Buffalo Bills from 2013 to 2014 and Jacksonville Jaguars from 2016 to 2020.

Marrone won the Pinstripe Bowl twice with Syracuse, which led to him being hired as the Bills' head coach. Marrone helped the Bills obtain their first winning record for a decade during the 2014 season, but he opted-out of his contract the same year. Joining the Jaguars in 2015 as an assistant coach, Marrone was named interim head coach near the end of the 2016 season and officially became head coach for 2017. His 2017 campaign was his most successful, leading the Jaguars to their first playoff appearance since 2007 and their first division title since 1999 en route to an AFC Championship Game appearance. However, Marrone's subsequent seasons saw the team finish at the bottom of their division, and he was fired in 2020 after a franchise-worst 1–15 record. Marrone returned to college football before being hired by the Saints in 2022.

== Playing career ==
Marrone was born on July 25, 1964, in the Bronx. He is of Italian ancestry. Marrone was a three-year letterman at Syracuse University, playing from 1983 to 1985 on the offensive line and he returned to graduate from the university in 1991.

Marrone was drafted in the sixth round of the 1986 NFL draft by the Los Angeles Raiders, but failed to make the 53-man roster. In the 1987 season, he landed a spot on the roster of the Miami Dolphins, seeing action in four games.

In subsequent years, Marrone spent time in camp with the New Orleans Saints, Pittsburgh Steelers, Dallas Cowboys, and Minnesota Vikings — managing to land on a roster and see action in only one more NFL game, playing for the Saints in 1989. In all, Marrone would be cut six times by NFL teams.

Marrone ended his playing career taking the field in 1991 and 1992 with the London Monarchs of the World League of American Football, helping to win the World Bowl for the Monarchs in 1991.

== Coaching career ==
=== Syracuse University ===
On December 11, 2008, after the 2008 season, Marrone was chosen as Syracuse University's head football coach by athletic director Daryl Gross. He was the first Syracuse alumnus to serve as head football coach since Reaves H. Baysinger in 1948. Before being hired at Syracuse, Marrone served as an assistant coach for numerous universities and NFL teams starting in 1992, including a stint with the New Orleans Saints as an offensive coordinator from 2006 to 2008.

Reportedly, alumni such as Tim Green and Floyd Little wanted Marrone from the moment the previous coach, Greg Robinson, was fired. When Marrone was interviewed by Green, it was learned that Marrone had kept a folder of current high school players in the Syracuse area to get a head start in recruiting.

==== 2009 ====
In Marrone's first season, the Syracuse Orange finished with four wins, one more than the previous year.

==== 2010 ====
The Orange doubled that output the following season. The eight wins in 2010 were the most since 2001 for the Orange. The 2010 season was highlighted with a victory over Kansas State and a victory in the first ever Pinstripe Bowl in New York City. This was the Orange's first bowl win since 2001.

==== 2011 ====
In 2011, the team started 5–2, which included a win over then No. 11 West Virginia. After the 5–2 start, the Orange failed to win another game in the season, ending with a 5–7 record.

==== 2012 ====
In 2012, Marrone coached the Orange to an 8–5 record, and a share of the Big East title as the result of a four-way tie. Their 38–14 victory in the Pinstripe Bowl again came against West Virginia.

=== Buffalo Bills ===
On January 6, 2013, Marrone was chosen to succeed Chan Gailey as head coach of the Buffalo Bills. His overall record during his two seasons as head coach of the Bills was 15–17. During his Bills' tenure, Marrone nicknamed himself "Saint Doug," referring to the fact that it takes two miracles to be canonized as a saint (he believed winning at Syracuse was one miracle and winning at Buffalo would qualify as the other).

In 2014, the Bills finished with a record of 9–7, second place in the AFC East and two wins away from making the playoffs. This was the Bills' first winning season in ten years (when the Bills finished 9–7 under Mike Mularkey in 2004). At the end of the 2014 season, it was revealed that Marrone had a three-day "out" clause in his contract in the event of an ownership change; the clause was triggered by the sale of the Bills in 2014 after the death of the Bills' founder and long-time owner Ralph Wilson. Marrone exercised the out clause and quit on December 31, 2014, and still collected his 2015 salary in full. After Marrone quit, several players expressed their displeasure and disgust with both the decision and the way that he informed the team. One of the captains and the longest-tenured player on the team, running back Fred Jackson, said it was "like getting punched in the stomach." Marrone interviewed with the New York Jets for their head coaching position; his interview reportedly did not go well.

=== Jacksonville Jaguars ===
Following Marrone's two-year stint as the head coach for the Buffalo Bills, the Jacksonville Jaguars hired Marrone as assistant head coach and offensive line coach on January 20, 2015.

On December 19, 2016, Marrone was named the interim head coach of the Jaguars following the firing of former head coach Gus Bradley. He coached the final two games of the 2016 season. On January 9, 2017, the Jaguars officially removed the interim tag and named Marrone the fifth head coach in team history. That same day, the Jaguars also brought back former head coach Tom Coughlin, the franchise's first head coach from 1995 to 2002, who was hired as the Executive Vice President of football operations, a position he held until the 2019 season.

In 2017, the Jaguars won the AFC South and made the playoffs for the first time since the 2007 season. On January 7, 2018, the Jaguars won their first playoff game under Marrone, defeating the Buffalo Bills 10–3 in the Wild Card Round. The Jaguars then upset the Pittsburgh Steelers in the Divisional Round, advancing to the AFC Championship Game, where they were defeated by the New England Patriots by a score of 24–20.

On February 23, 2018, the Jaguars extended his contract through 2021.

On January 4, 2021, Marrone was fired after the Jaguars finished the 2020 season with a 1–15 record. He finished his tenure in Jacksonville with a 23–43 (.348) record with a 2–1 (.667) playoff record for a career record of 25–44 (.362).

=== Alabama ===
On January 19, 2021, Marrone was named the offensive line coach at the University of Alabama under head coach Nick Saban.

On February 1, 2022, It was reported that Eric Wolford has accepted the position of Offensive Line Coach at Alabama. It is unclear whether Doug Marrone was fired or asked to resign from Alabama.

=== New Orleans Saints (second stint) ===
On February 9, 2022, Marrone was hired as the offensive line coach for the New Orleans Saints under new head coach Dennis Allen. This was Marrone's first stint with the Saints in 14 years, as he previously served as their offensive coordinator under former head coach Sean Payton from 2006–2008.

On February 3, 2024, the Saints dismissed Marrone from his position.

=== New England Patriots ===
On January 28, 2025, Marrone was hired to serve as the offensive line coach for the New England Patriots under new head coach Mike Vrabel.

== Head coaching record ==
=== College ===
Year	Team	Overall	Conference	Standing	Bowl/playoffs	Coaches^{#}	AP^{°}
Syracuse Orange (Big East Conference) (2009–2012)
2009	Syracuse	4–8	1–6	T–7th			
2010	Syracuse	8–5	4–3	4th	W Pinstripe		
2011	Syracuse	5–7	1–6	T–7th			
2012	Syracuse	8–5	5–2	T–1st	W Pinstripe		
Syracuse:		25–25	11–17				
Total:		25–25					
National championship Conference title Conference division title or championship game berth
^{†}Indicates Bowl Coalition, Bowl Alliance, BCS, or CFP / New Years' Six bowl.; ^{#}Rankings from final Coaches Poll.; ^{°}Rankings from final AP Poll.

=== NFL ===
Team	Year	Regular season					Postseason			
Team	Year	Won	Lost	Ties	Win %	Finish	Won	Lost	Win %	Result
BUF	2013	6	10	0	.375	4th in AFC East	—	—	—	—
BUF	2014	9	7	0	.563	2nd in AFC East	—	—	—	—
BUF total		15	17	0	.469					
JAX*	2016	1	1	0	.500	4th in AFC South	—	—	—	—
JAX	2017	10	6	0	.625	1st in AFC South	2	1	.667	Lost to New England Patriots in AFC Championship game
JAX	2018	5	11	0	.313	4th in AFC South	—	—	—	—
JAX	2019	6	10	0	.375	4th in AFC South	—	—	—	—
JAX	2020	1	15	0	.063	4th in AFC South	—	—	—	—
JAX total		23	43	0	.348		2	1	.667	
Total		38	60	0	.388		2	1	.667	

* – Interim head coach
