= 2011 Cincinnati Bearcats football team =

American college football season

2011 Cincinnati Bearcats football

Big East co-champion Liberty Bowl champion

Liberty Bowl, W 31–24 vs. Vanderbilt
- Conference: Big East Conference

Ranking
- Coaches: No. 21
- AP: No. 25
- Record: 10–3 (5–2 Big East)
- Head coach: Butch Jones (2nd season)
- Offensive coordinator: Mike Bajakian (2nd season)
- Offensive scheme: Multiple
- Co-defensive coordinators: Tim Banks (2nd season); John Jancek (2nd season)
- Base defense: 4–3
- Home stadium: Nippert Stadium; Paul Brown Stadium

2011 Big East Conference football standings
	Conf.			Overall
Team	W		L	W		L
No. 17 West Virginia $+	5	–	2	10	–	3
No. 25 Cincinnati +	5	–	2	10	–	3
Louisville +	5	–	2	7	–	6
Rutgers	4	–	3	9	–	4
Pittsburgh	4	–	3	6	–	7
Connecticut	3	–	4	5	–	7
South Florida	1	–	6	5	–	7
Syracuse	1	–	6	5	–	7
$ – BCS representative as conference champion; + – Conference co-champions; As of January 11, 2012; Rankings from AP Poll

The 2011 Cincinnati Bearcats football team represented the University of Cincinnati as a member of the Big East Conference during the 2011 NCAA Division I FBS football season. The Bearcats were led by second-year head coach Butch Jones and played their home games at Nippert Stadium and two conference games at Paul Brown Stadium. They finished the season 10–3 overall and 5–2 in Big East play to share the conference championship with Louisville and West Virginia. Despite the conference title, which was their third in the last four years, they did not receive the conference's automatic bid into a BCS game (West Virginia received the bid based on BCS rankings). They were invited to the Liberty Bowl where they defeated Vanderbilt 31–24.

== Schedule ==
Date	Time	Opponent	Rank	Site	TV	Result	Attendance	Source
September 3	7:00 pm	Austin Peay*		Nippert Stadium; Cincinnati, OH	FS Ohio	W 72–10	23,282	
September 10	3:30 pm	at Tennessee*		Neyland Stadium; Knoxville, TN	ESPN2	L 23–45	94,207	
September 17	3:30 pm	Akron*		Nippert Stadium; Cincinnati, OH	ESPN3	W 59–14	24,991	
September 22	8:00 pm	NC State*		Nippert Stadium; Cincinnati, OH	ESPN	W 44–14	28,431	
October 1	1:00 pm	at Miami (OH)*		Yager Stadium; Oxford, OH (116th Victory Bell)	ESPN3	W 27–0	16,408	
October 15	12:00 pm	Louisville^{†}		Paul Brown Stadium; Cincinnati, OH (Keg of Nails)	Big East Network	W 25–16	40,971	
October 22	12:00 pm	at South Florida		Raymond James Stadium; Tampa, FL	Big East Network	W 37–34	44,248	
November 5	7:00 pm	at Pittsburgh	No. 24	Heinz Field; Pittsburgh, PA (River City Rivalry)	ESPNU	W 26–23	49,362	
November 12	12:00 pm	West Virginia	No. 23	Paul Brown Stadium; Cincinnati, OH	ABC/ESPN3	L 21–24	48,152	
November 19	12:00 pm	at Rutgers		High Point Solutions Stadium; Piscataway, NJ	ESPNU	L 3–20	47,447	
November 26	12:00 pm	at Syracuse		Carrier Dome; Syracuse, NY	Big East Network	W 30–13	38,159	
December 3	12:00 pm	Connecticut		Nippert Stadium; Cincinnati, OH	ESPN	W 35–27	27,930	
December 31	3:30 pm	vs. Vanderbilt*		Liberty Bowl Memorial Stadium; Memphis, TN (Liberty Bowl)	ABC	W 31–24	57,103	
*Non-conference game; ^{†}Homecoming; Rankings from AP Poll released prior to the game; All times are in Eastern time

== Roster ==
2011 Cincinnati Bearcats football team roster
Players
Coaches
Offense

Pos.	#	Name	Class
TE	86	Blake Annen	So
TE	18	Travis Kelce	Jr
RB	23	Isaiah Pead	Sr
TE	88	Adrien Robinson	Sr
WR	1	Kenbrell Thompkins	Jr

Defense

Pos.	#	Name	Class
DT	40	John Hughes	Sr
LB	37	J. K. Schaffer	Sr
DT	78	Derek Wolfe	Sr

Special teams

Pos.	#	Name	Class

Head coach

- Butch Jones

Coordinators/assistant coaches

Legend

- (C) Team captain
- (S) Suspended
- (I) Ineligible
- Injured
- Redshirt

Roster

== Rankings ==
Ranking movements Legend: ██ Increase in ranking ██ Decrease in ranking — = Not ranked RV = Received votes
	Week															
Poll	Pre	1	2	3	4	5	6	7	8	9	10	11	12	13	14	Final
AP	—	—	—	RV	—	RV	RV	RV	24	23	23	RV	RV	RV	RV	25
Coaches	—	RV	—	—	—	RV	—	RV	23	22	18	RV	—	25	24	21
Harris	Not released						RV	RV	24	23	22	RV	RV	RV	24	Not released
BCS	Not released							—	—	—	23	—	—	—	—	Not released

== Game summaries ==
=== Louisville ===
Team	1	2	3	4	Total
Louisville	6	10	0	0	16
• Cincinnati	0	7	7	11	25

- Date: October 15
- Location: Paul Brown Stadium, Cincinnati, OH
- Game start: 12:09 pm EDT
- Elapsed time: 3:12
- Game attendance: 40,971
- Referee: Dennis Hennigan
- TV announcers (Big East Network): Mike Gleason, John Congemi, & Eamon McAnaney

Scoring summary
1	7:47	LOU	Chris Philpott 42-yard field goal, Drive: 10 plays 55 yards, 5:13	LOU 3–0
1	1:41	LOU	Chris Philpott 51-yard field goal, Drive: 4 plays 15 yards, 2:46	LOU 6–0
2	5:01	CIN	D.J. Woods 26-yard pass from Zach Collaros (Tony Miliano kick), Drive: 4 plays, 37 yards, 1:19	CIN 7–6
2	2:54	LOU	Chris Philpott 18-yard field goal, Drive: 6 plays 67 yards, 2:07	LOU 9–7
2	0:06	LOU	Mike Evans 63-yard interception return (Chris Philpott kick), Drive: 9 plays 47 yards, 2:48	LOU 16–7
3	4:41	CIN	Zach Collaros 1-yard run (Tony Miliano kick), Drive: 7 plays 54 yards, 3:10	LOU 16–14
4	12:19	CIN	Isaiah Pead 50-yard run (Zach Collaros to Adrien Robinson pass), Drive: 2 plays 50 yards, 0:16	CIN 22–16
4	1:21	CIN	Tony Miliano 21-yard field goal, Drive: 6 plays 40 yards, 1:44	CIN 25–16

== Awards and milestones ==
=== Big East Conference honors ===
- Offensive Player of the Year: Isaiah Pead
- Defensive Player of the Year: Derek Wolfe
- Coach of the Year: Butch Jones

==== Big East Conference All-Conference First Team ====
- Isaiah Pead, RB
- Alex Hoffman, OL
- Derek Wolfe, DL
- J.K. Schaffer, LB
- Pat O'Donnell, P

==== Big East Conference All-Conference Third Team ====
- Anthony McClung, WR
- Walter Stewart, DL
- Dan Giordano, DL
- Camerron Cheatham, DB

== Players in the 2012 NFL draft ==
Player	Position	Round	Pick	NFL club
Derek Wolfe	DT	2	36	Denver Broncos
Isaiah Pead	RB	2	50	St. Louis Rams
John Hughes	DT	3	87	Cleveland Browns
Adrien Robinson	TE	4	127	New York Giants
