= 2011 Louisville Cardinals football team =

American college football season

2011 Louisville Cardinals football

Big East co-champion

Belk Bowl, L 24–31 vs. NC State
- Conference: Big East Conference
- Record: 7–6 (5–2 Big East)
- Head coach: Charlie Strong (2nd season)
- Offensive coordinator: Mike Sanford (2nd season; first 5 games); Shawn Watson (interim; remainder of season)
- Offensive scheme: Spread
- Defensive coordinator: Vance Bedford (2nd season)
- Base defense: 4–3
- Home stadium: Papa John's Cardinal Stadium

2011 Big East Conference football standings
	Conf.			Overall
Team	W		L	W		L
No. 17 West Virginia $+	5	–	2	10	–	3
No. 25 Cincinnati +	5	–	2	10	–	3
Louisville +	5	–	2	7	–	6
Rutgers	4	–	3	9	–	4
Pittsburgh	4	–	3	6	–	7
Connecticut	3	–	4	5	–	7
South Florida	1	–	6	5	–	7
Syracuse	1	–	6	5	–	7
$ – BCS representative as conference champion; + – Conference co-champions; As of January 11, 2012; Rankings from AP Poll

The 2011 Louisville Cardinals football team represented the University of Louisville in the 2011 NCAA Division I FBS football season. The Cardinals were led by second-year head coach Charlie Strong and played their home games at Papa John's Cardinal Stadium. They were a member of the Big East Conference. They finished the season 7–6, 5–2 in Big East play to share the conference championship with Cincinnati and West Virginia. Due to tie-break rules, the Cardinals did not receive the Big East's automatic bid into a BCS bowl; West Virginia received the bid. The Cardinals were instead invited to the Belk Bowl, where they were defeated by North Carolina State, 31–24.

== Schedule ==
Date	Time	Opponent	Site	TV	Result	Attendance
September 1	6:00 p.m.	Murray State*	Papa John's Cardinal Stadium; Louisville, KY	ESPNU	W 21–9	46,157
September 9	8:00 p.m.	Florida International*	Papa John's Cardinal Stadium; Louisville, KY	ESPN	L 17–24	47,228
September 17	7:00 p.m.	at Kentucky*	Commonwealth Stadium; Lexington, KY (Governor's Cup)	ESPNU	W 24–17	68,170
October 1	3:30 p.m.	Marshall*	Papa John's Cardinal Stadium; Louisville, KY	BIG EAST Network	L 13–17	53,267
October 8	12:00 p.m.	at North Carolina*	Kenan Memorial Stadium; Chapel Hill, NC	ESPN2	L 7–14	51,500
October 15	12:00 p.m.	at Cincinnati	Paul Brown Stadium; Cincinnati, OH (Keg of Nails)	BIG EAST Network	L 16–25	40,971
October 21	8:00 p.m.	Rutgers	Papa John's Cardinal Stadium; Louisville, KY	ESPN	W 16–14	48,435
October 29	12:00 p.m.	Syracuse^{†}	Papa John's Cardinal Stadium; Louisville, KY	BIG EAST Network	W 27–10	44,817
November 5	12:00 p.m.	at No. 24 West Virginia	Mountaineer Field; Morgantown, WV	BIG EAST Network	W 38–35	57,287
November 12	12:00 p.m.	Pittsburgh	Papa John's Cardinal Stadium; Louisville, KY	BIG EAST Network	L 14–21	51,321
November 19	12:00 p.m.	at Connecticut	Rentschler Field; East Hartford, CT	BIG EAST Network	W 34–20	34,483
November 25	11:00 a.m.	at South Florida	Raymond James Stadium; Tampa, FL	ESPN2	W 34–24	46,666
December 27	8:00 p.m.	vs. North Carolina State*	Bank of America Stadium; Charlotte, NC (Belk Bowl)	ESPN	L 24–31	58,427
*Non-conference game; ^{†}Homecoming; Rankings from Coaches' Poll released prior to the game; All times are in Eastern time

== Roster ==
Quarterbacks: 4 Will Stein – (redshirt) JR; 5 Teddy Bridgewater – FR; 10 Dominique Brown – SO; 12 Luke Brohm – FR; 19 Jerry Arlinghaus – FR; Running backs: 20 Victor Anderson – SR; 22 Corvin Lamb – FR; 28 Jeremy Wright – (redshirt) SO; 30 Kamal Hogan – (redshirt) FR; 32 Senorise Perry – SO; 48 Nick Heuser – SO (FB); 49 Jarel McGriff-Culver – (redshirt) FR; Wide receivers: 1 Joshua Bellamy – SR; 2 Michaelee Harris – (redshirt) FR; 7 Damian Copeland – (redshirt) SO; 9 DeVante Parker – FR; 14 Andrell Smith – JR; 29 Stephen Goodwin – SO; 31 DeMarcus Topp – (redshirt) JR; 37 Lincoln Carr – JR; 82 Eli Rogers – FR; 84 Aaron Nanace – SO; 88 Jarrett Davis – SO; 89 Scott Radcliff – JR; Tight ends: 11 Josh Chichester – (redshirt) SR; 80 Stephon Ball – (redshirt) JR; 81 Chris White – (redshirt) SO; 87 Scot MacMillan – FR; 86 Lorenzo Mauldin – FR	Offensive linemen: 53 Jake Smith – (redshirt) FR (OL); 54 Mike Romano – FR (C); 55 Mario Benavides – (redshirt) JR (C); 59 Zach Perkins – SO (OL); 62 John Clark – (redshirt) SO (OL); 65 Dylan Kupper – FR (OL); 66 Alex Kupper – (redshirt) JR (OL); 68 Kamran Joyer – (redshirt) SO (OL); 69 Chris Walker – (redshirt) SO (OL); 70 John Miller – FR (OL); 71 Chris Acosta – (redshirt) FR (OL); 72 Hunter Stout – (redshirt) SO (OL); 73 Hector Hernandez – (redshirt) SR (OL); 74 Ryan Mack – FR (OL); 75 Ryan Kessling – (redshirt) SR (OT); 76 Chase Petersen – FR (OL); 78 Aaron Epps – FR (OL); 79 Jamon Brown – FR (OG); Defensive linemen: 6 Greg Scruggs – SR (DE); 17 Marcus Smith – SO (DE); 44 B.J. Butler – SO (DE); 47 Malcolm Mitchell – (redshirt) SO (DE); 57 Jordan Tennyson – JR (DE); 90 B.J. Dubose – Freshman (DE); 91 William Savoy – (redshirt) Senior (DE); 92 Brandon Dunn – SO (DT); 93 Roy Philon – (redshirt) SO (DT); 95 Randy Salmon – (redshirt) JR (DT); 99 Jamaine Brooks – (redshirt) Freshman (DL)	Linebackers: 2 Preston Brown – SO; 24 Daniel Brown – (redshirt) JR; 27 Mike Addesa – FR; 34 George Durant – (redshirt) SO; 37 Tyon Dixon – SO; 39 Chris Zelli – FR; 42 Champ Lee – SO; 42 Jalen Harrington – FR; 43 Deon Rogers – SO; 46 Dexter Heyman – SR; 48 Deiontrez Mount – FR; 51 Mike Privott – (redshirt) SO; 56 Tarik Rollins – (redshirt) SO; Defensive backs: 3 Charles Gaines – Freshman (CB); 8 Darius Ashley – (redshirt) JR (CB); 13 Preston Pace – (redshirt) SR (CB); 15 Andrew Johnson – FR (CB); 18 Titus Teague – (redshirt) SO (CB); 19 Terrell Floyd – FR (CB); 19 Joe Castaneda – FR (DB); 21 Adrian Bushell – (redshirt) JR (CB); 22 Jordon Paschal – (redshirt) FR (CB); 23 Terrence Simien – (redshirt) SR (S); 25 Calvin Pryor – FR (S); 26 Zed Evans – (redshirt) SO (CB); 27 Jermaine Reve – FR (S); 29 Hakeem Smith – (redshirt) SO (S); 33 Mike Evans – SR (DB); 35 Anthony Conner – (redshirt) SR (CB); 36 Shenard Holton – JR (S); 38 Rashad Stewart – SO (DB); 39 Kenneth Jaboin – SR (DB); 41 Stephan Robinson – (redshirt) FR (CB); Special teams: 12 Chris Philpott – SR (K); 18 Matthew Nakatani – (redshirt) FR (K); 33 Grant Donovan – (redshirt) FR (LS); 35 Andrew Fletcher – (redshirt) FR (K); 38 Ryan Johnson – (redshirt) FR (P); 40 Jordan Bleser – SR (P); 45 John Wallace – FR (P/K)	Head coach: Charlie Strong; Assistant coaches: Shawn Watson – Offensive coordinator/quarterbacks coach; Vance Bedford – Defensive coordinator; Kenny Carter – Special teams coordinator/running backs coach; Dave borbely – Offensive line coach; Ron Dugans – Wide receivers coach; Clint hurtt – Recruiting doordinator/defensive line coach; Brian jean-mary – Linebackers coach; Larry slade – Secondary coach; Pat moorer – Strength and conditioning Coach
