= Charlie Strong =

American football coach (born 1960)

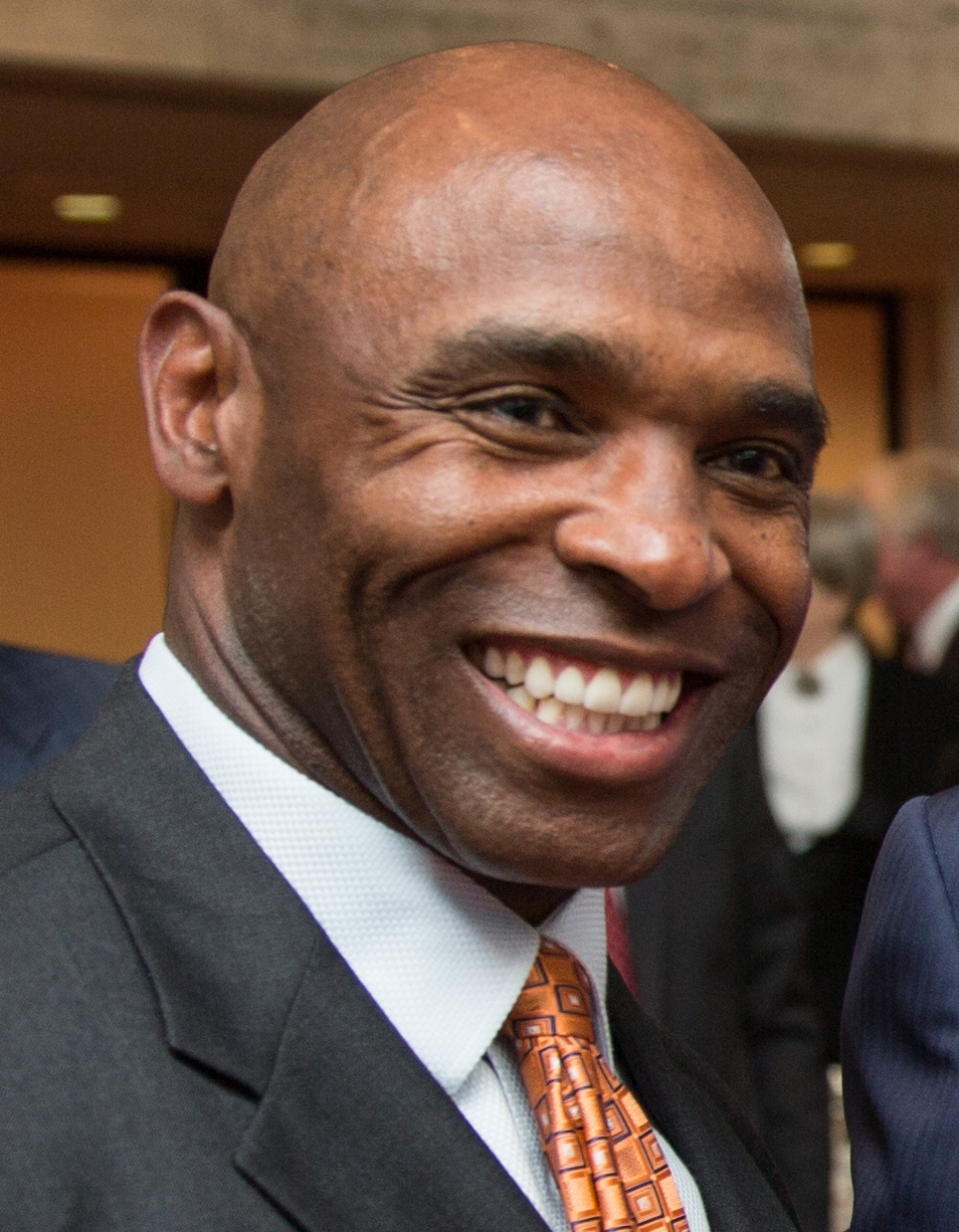
- Strong at the LBJ Presidential Library in 2014

Personal information
- Born: August 2, 1960 (age 66); Batesville, Arkansas, U.S.

Career information
- Position: Defensive back
- High school: Batesville (AR)
- College: Central Arkansas

Career history
- Florida (1983–1984) Graduate assistant; Texas A&M (1985) Graduate assistant; Southern Illinois (1986–1987) Wide receivers coach; Florida (1988–1989) Outside linebackers coach; Ole Miss (1990) Wide receivers coach; Florida (1991–1993) Defensive ends coach; Florida (1994) Associate head coach & defensive tackles coach; Notre Dame (1995–1998) Defensive line coach; South Carolina (1999–2002) Defensive coordinator; Florida (2003–2004) Defensive coordinator & defensive ends coach; Florida (2004) Interim head coach; Florida (2005–2007) Assistant head coach, co-defensive coordinator & linebackers coach; Florida (2008–2009) Associate head coach, defensive coordinator & linebackers coach; Louisville (2010–2013) Head coach; Texas (2014–2016) Head coach; South Florida (2017–2019) Head coach; Alabama (2020) Defensive analyst; Jacksonville Jaguars (2021) Assistant head coach & inside linebackers coach; Miami (FL) (2022) Co-defensive coordinator & linebackers coach; Alabama (2023) Defensive analyst; Tampa Bay Buccaneers (2025) Defensive line coach

Awards and highlights
- As head coach: 2013 Sugar Bowl; 2x Big East (2011–2012); 2× Big East Coach of the Year (2010, 2012); As assistant coach: 2 BCS national (2006, 2008); CFP national (2020)

Head coaching record
- Regular season: NCAA: 70–49 (.588)
- Career: NCAA: 74–53 (.583)

Charles Rene Strong (born August 2, 1960) is an American football coach who was most recently the defensive line coach for the Tampa Bay Buccaneers of the National Football League (NFL). He recently served as the assistant head coach and inside linebackers coach for the Jacksonville Jaguars of the National Football League (NFL) in 2021 and also previously served as a defensive analyst at the University of Alabama in 2020.

Strong served as the head coach at the University of South Florida from 2017 to 2019, University of Texas at Austin from 2014 to 2016 and the University of Louisville from 2010 to 2013. Prior to becoming head coach at Louisville, Strong held numerous assistant coaching positions. During his four-year stint at Louisville, he led the Cardinals to a 37–15 record and reached a bowl game each season, including the 2013 Sugar Bowl. After the 2013 season he left Louisville to become the head coach at the University of Texas. He was fired by Texas after the 2016 season with a 16–21 record in three seasons. One month after leaving Texas, Strong was hired at South Florida where he led the Bulls to a 21–16 record before being fired in 2019.

== Early life ==
Charles Rene Strong was born in Batesville, Arkansas, one of six children of mother Delois Ramsey. Strong's father, also named Charles Strong, was a teacher and coach in Luxora, Arkansas and never married Ramsey. The younger Strong grew up in a blended household with his aunt and aunt's six children. After lettering for four years (1980–1983) as a defensive back at the University of Central Arkansas, Strong joined the University of Florida coaching staff as a graduate assistant in 1983. He later served as a graduate assistant at Texas A&M in 1985. He received a master's degree from Henderson State University and also received a master's degree and education specialist degree from the University of Florida. He is a member of Phi Beta Sigma fraternity.

== Coaching career ==
=== Early positions ===
Strong's first full-time coaching job was at Southern Illinois in 1986, where he coached wide receivers. He later assumed defensive coaching duties at Florida, Ole Miss, and Notre Dame.

=== South Carolina ===
In 1999, Strong joined the South Carolina Gamecocks as defensive coordinator. His stifling defenses and charismatic personality created buzz that he would be possibly the first black head coach in the SEC, but job offers were slim. Sylvester Croom eventually broke the color barrier in the SEC coaching ranks in 2004.

=== Florida ===
Strong was hired as defensive coordinator for the Florida Gators before the 2003 season. Florida head coach Ron Zook was fired midway through the Gators' 2004 season, but continued to coach until the bowl game; Strong served as interim coach of the Gators for one game, the December 2004 Peach Bowl. Florida lost the game, 27–10, to Miami. When Urban Meyer was hired as Florida's head coach, Strong was the only assistant coach retained from Zook's staff.

In a January 2009 interview with the Orlando Sentinel, Strong expressed his belief that race played a large part in the reason that he hadn't been offered a head coaching job in 2009. Strong, whose wife is white, especially cited prospective employers' discomfort with his interracial marriage. Strong was a 2009 finalist for the Broyles Award, given annually to the nation's top assistant coach.

=== Louisville ===
He became the 21st head football coach at the University of Louisville on December 9, 2009. In a telephone interview that day with ESPN.com columnist Pat Forde, former Indianapolis Colts head coach Tony Dungy said of Strong, "When they see what he can do, you're probably going to have a lot of people disappointed they didn't hire him sooner."

Strong led Louisville to a victory in the 2013 Sugar Bowl over his former team, the Florida Gators, by a final score of 33–23. It was the biggest upset victory in terms of point spread in any BCS bowl game since the inception of the BCS in 1998, as Florida entered the game favored by almost two touchdowns.

On January 23, 2013, Strong was given a $1.4 million raise which brought his annual compensation to $3.7 million and raised his buyout to $5 million. At the time it made him 7th highest paid active coach in college football and highest paid coach outside the SEC, Big 12, and Big Ten conferences.

=== Texas ===
On January 5, 2014, the University of Texas announced that Strong would be leaving the University of Louisville to accept the head football coach position at Texas to replace Mack Brown. Strong's 5-year contract was worth $5 million annually. He was formally introduced as Texas' 29th head coach the next day and became the first black head coach of the Texas football program.

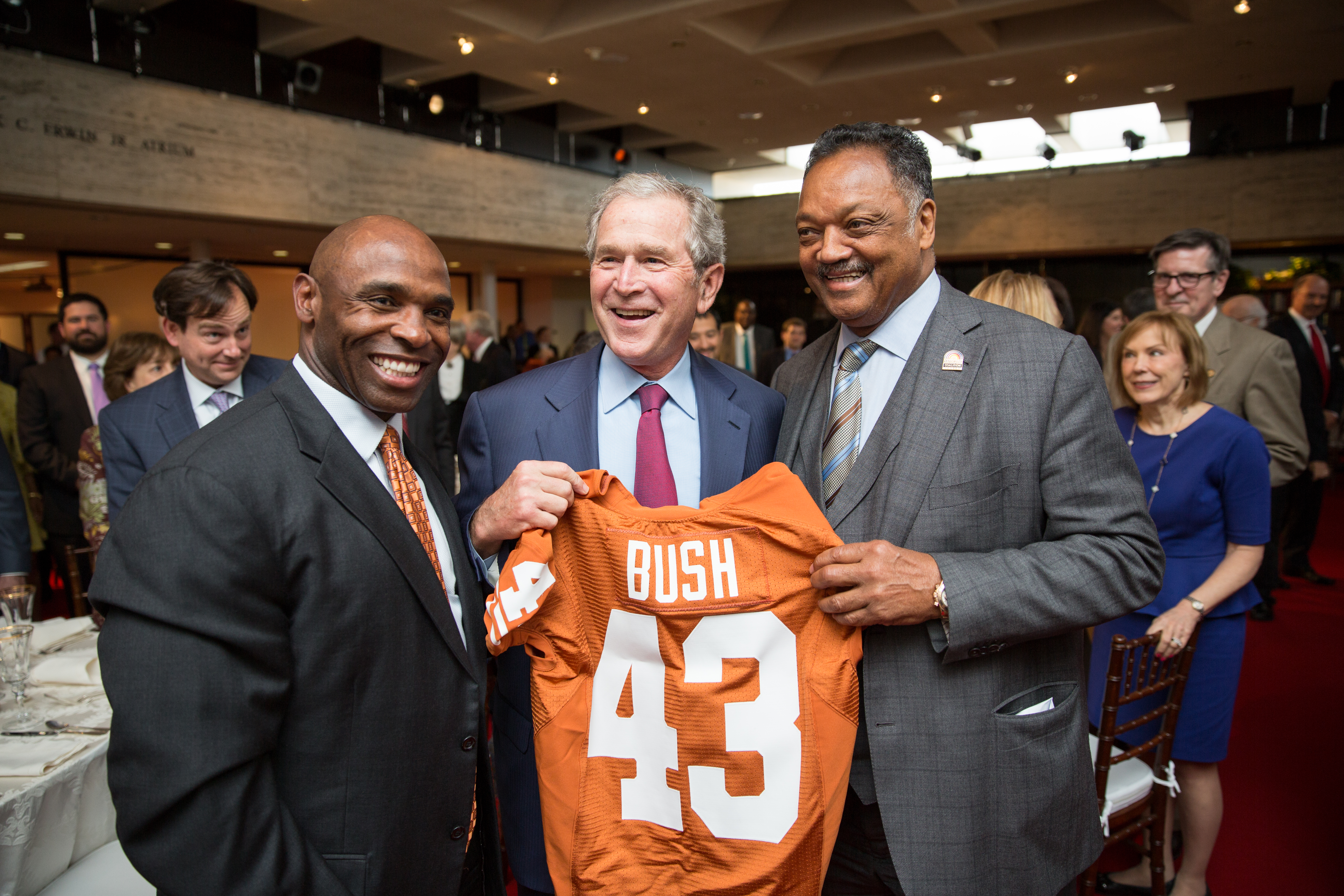
Strong with George W. Bush and Jesse Jackson in April 2014

Texas athletic director Steve Patterson and university president Bill Powers stated their reasons for hiring Strong for the head-coaching position were Strong's commitment to the tradition of the UT Football program as well as the development of student-athletes. Strong discussed his devotion to his athletes in his first press conference as the head coach of Texas, "I want to see [the players] develop on the field as well as off the field... The program is always going to be about physical and mental toughness."

In his first training camp as Longhorns coach, Strong suspended or dismissed a number of players for legal and disciplinary reasons. Players went to training camp with blank white helmets and Strong said they would have to earn the right to have the Longhorn logo on them.

Texas under Strong started 2–4, which included a 20–17 nail-biter defeat to #12 UCLA and 31–26 close loss to #11 Oklahoma. The Longhorns rallied and finished 6–6, which included an upset win at home versus #23 West Virginia, 33–16, and a 48–45 shootout home win against Iowa State, Strong's first shootout win in the Big 12. A 41–7 loss to BYU at home, 28–7 loss to #7 Baylor at home, 23–0 shutout by #10 Kansas State in Manhattan, and a 48–10 home loss to #5 TCU proved to be blemishes to Strong's first season in Austin. Under Strong, the Longhorns earned a bowl bid in his first season. On renewing an old Southwest Conference rivalry, playing against Arkansas in the Advocare V100 Texas Bowl in Houston, Strong commented, "I grew up in Arkansas, grew up an Arkansas fan because it's a major university in the state," Strong said. "So many memorable games. Like I said, the '69 game was an unbelievable game. Growing up around it, you just know how big it was and how important it is to so many people." Texas lost the game by a score of 31–7.

In 2015, Strong's coaching staff got a top-10, recruiting class, competing with rivals Texas A&M, Baylor, Texas Tech and TCU in in-state recruiting. During the spring, the coaches switched the offense to a spread offense, as the quarterbacks Strong recruits are used to this style since it is extensively used in high school, Strong noted.

Strong's first upset win against a top 10 team at Texas was in the Red River Showdown in his second year, beating Oklahoma 24–17. Strong had begun the season 1–4, and coming into the game, the Longhorns program was noted by multiple national media outlets as being in trouble. The Longhorns dominated the rushing attack with 313 yards on the ground and had two players rush for over 100 yards in the game. Both players (QB Jerrod Heard and RB D'Onta Foreman) were in their second years, signalling the success of Strong's recruiting at Texas. After the victory, the players picked up Strong and crowd-surfed him in the middle of the field, then Strong posed for photos wearing the Golden Hat. Texas would finish 5–7, not eligible for a bowl game, but ended the season on a high note upsetting No. 12 Baylor. The offseason saw Strong bring in another offensive coordinator in Sterlin Gilbert from Tulsa, and a top-10 recruiting class. Texas started their 2016 campaign against No. 10 Notre Dame at home, in which Strong started freshman QB Shane Buechele and Tyrone Swoopes scored the game-winning touchdown to upset Notre Dame in 2OT. In the following AP poll, Texas was ranked for the first time under Strong, at No. 11.

Strong finished the 2016 season with a losing record of 5–7, the third season in a row he had guided the University of Texas football program to a losing season, after inheriting a program from Mack Brown who had achieved an 8–5 record in 2013 and winning records in 15 of 16 seasons at Texas. The low point of the 2016 campaign came in the next-to-last game of the season when the Longhorns blew a 21–10 lead in a 24–21 overtime loss to a Kansas team that had won only one game all season beforehand.

On November 26, 2016, Strong was fired from his position as head coach.

=== South Florida ===
On December 11, 2016, Strong was named as the fourth head coach of the University of South Florida.

He was fired after the 2019 season.

=== Jacksonville Jaguars ===
On February 11, 2021, Strong was hired by the Jacksonville Jaguars as their assistant to the head coach and inside linebackers coach, reuniting with head coach Urban Meyer.

=== Miami (FL) ===
On March 4, 2022, Strong was hired by the University of Miami as their co-defensive coordinator and linebackers coach. On February 9, 2023, Strong indicated that he would not be returning to Miami after he was passed over for the defensive coordinator position.

=== Alabama ===
In 2020, Strong was hired as a defensive analyst at the University of Alabama under head coach Nick Saban, following his termination from South Florida. As a defensive analyst, Strong helped the Crimson Tide win the 2021 College Football Playoff National Championship. On March 1, 2023, the University of Alabama under head coach Nick Saban announced that they had hired Strong as a defensive analyst for the 2023 season.

=== Tampa Bay Buccaneers ===
On February 5, 2025, the Tampa Bay Buccaneers hired Strong to serve as their defensive line coach. On January 8, 2026, Strong was fired by the Buccaneers.

=== Memphis ===
During the 2026 offseason, Strong was an unofficial consultant to Memphis head coach Charles Huff.

== Head coaching record ==
Year	Team	Overall	Conference	Standing	Bowl/playoffs	Coaches^{#}	AP^{°}
Florida Gators (Southeastern Conference) (2004)
2004	Florida	0–1	0–0		L Peach		
Florida:		0–1	0–0				
Louisville Cardinals (Big East Conference) (2010–2012)
2010	Louisville	7–6	3–4	T–5th	W Beef 'O' Brady's		
2011	Louisville	7–6	5–2	T–1st	L Belk		
2012	Louisville	11–2	5–2	T–1st	W Sugar^{†}	13	13
Louisville Cardinals (American Athletic Conference) (2013)
2013	Louisville	12–1	7–1	2nd	W Russell Athletic	15	15
Louisville:		37–15	20–9				
Texas Longhorns (Big 12 Conference) (2014–2016)
2014	Texas	6–7	5–4	T–4th	L Texas		
2015	Texas	5–7	4–5	T–5th			
2016	Texas	5–7	3–6	T–6th			
Texas:		16–21	12–15				
South Florida Bulls (American Athletic Conference) (2017–2019)
2017	South Florida	10–2	6–2	2nd (East)	W Birmingham	21	21
2018	South Florida	7–6	3–5	4th (East)	L Gasparilla		
2019	South Florida	4–8	2–6	4th (East)			
South Florida:		21–16	11–13				
Total:		74–53 (.583)					
National championship Conference title Conference division title or championship game berth
^{†}Indicates BCS bowl.; ^{#}Rankings from final Coaches Poll.; ^{°}Rankings from final AP Poll.

== See also ==
- List of University of Florida alumni
