= 2011 Syracuse Orange football team =

American college football season

2011 Syracuse Orange football
- Conference: Big East Conference
- Record: 5–7 (1–6 Big East)
- Head coach: Doug Marrone (3rd season)
- Offensive coordinator: Nathaniel Hackett (1st season)
- Offensive scheme: Pro-style
- Defensive coordinator: Scott Shafer (3rd season)
- Base defense: 4–3
- Home stadium: Carrier Dome

2011 Big East Conference football standings
	Conf.			Overall
Team	W		L	W		L
No. 17 West Virginia $+	5	–	2	10	–	3
No. 25 Cincinnati +	5	–	2	10	–	3
Louisville +	5	–	2	7	–	6
Rutgers	4	–	3	9	–	4
Pittsburgh	4	–	3	6	–	7
Connecticut	3	–	4	5	–	7
South Florida	1	–	6	5	–	7
Syracuse	1	–	6	5	–	7
$ – BCS representative as conference champion; + – Conference co-champions; As of January 11, 2012; Rankings from AP Poll

The 2011 Syracuse Orange football team represented Syracuse University in the 2011 NCAA Division I FBS football season. The Orange were led by third year head coach Doug Marrone and played their home games at the Carrier Dome. They are a member of the Big East Conference. They finished the season 5–7, 1–6 in Big East play to finish in a tie for seventh place.

== Schedule ==
Date	Time	Opponent	Site	TV	Result	Attendance
September 1	8:00 pm	Wake Forest*	Carrier Dome; Syracuse, NY	ESPN3	W 36–29 ^{OT}	40,833
September 10	4:30 pm	Rhode Island*	Carrier Dome; Syracuse, NY	TWCSN	W 21–14	36,421
September 17	8:00 pm	at USC*	Los Angeles Memorial Coliseum; Los Angeles, CA	FX	L 17–38	65,873
September 24	12:00 pm	Toledo*	Carrier Dome; Syracuse, NY	Big East Network	W 33–30 ^{OT}	39,116
October 1	12:00 pm	Rutgers	Carrier Dome; Syracuse, NY	Big East Network	L 16–19 ^{2OT}	42,152
October 8	8:00 pm	at Tulane*	Louisiana Superdome; New Orleans, LA	CST	W 37–34	39,116
October 21	8:00 pm	No. 11 West Virginia	Carrier Dome; Syracuse, NY (Ben Schwartzwalder Trophy)	ESPN	W 49–23	45,265
October 29	12:00 pm	at Louisville	Papa John's Cardinal Stadium; Louisville, KY	Big East Network	L 10–27	44,817
November 5	12:00 pm	at Connecticut	Rentschler Field; East Hartford, CT (rivalry)	ESPNU	L 21–28	38,769
November 11	8:00 pm	South Florida^{†}	Carrier Dome; Syracuse, NY	ESPN2	L 17–37	41,582
November 26	12:00 pm	Cincinnati	Carrier Dome; Syracuse, NY	Big East Network	L 13–30	38,159
December 3	12:00 pm	at Pittsburgh	Heinz Field; Pittsburgh, PA (rivalry)	ESPN2	L 20–33	40,058
*Non-conference game; ^{†}Homecoming; Rankings from Associated Press released prior to game; All times are in Eastern time

== Roster ==
2011 Syracuse Orange football team roster
Players
Coaches
Offense

Pos.	#	Name	Class
QB	12	Ryan Nassib	Jr
G	66	Andrew Tiller	Sr
G	67	Justin Pugh	Jr

Defense

Pos.	#	Name	Class
FS	1	Phillip Thomas	Jr
SS	2	Olando Fisher	Sr
DE	99	Chandler Jones	Sr

Special teams

Pos.	#	Name	Class

Head coach

- Doug Marrone

Coordinators/assistant coaches

- John Anselmo (SUNY Cortland)
  3rd year – (associate head coach)
- Jason Rebrovich (SUNY Cortland)
  1st year – (defensive quality control coach)
- Evan Rothstein (SUNY Cortland)
  2nd year – (offensive quality control coach)

Legend

- (C) Team captain
- (S) Suspended
- (I) Ineligible
- Injured
- Redshirt

Roster
