= Ray Graham =

American football player (born 1990)

No. 37
- Position: Running back

Personal information
- Born: September 18, 1990 (age 36); Elizabeth, New Jersey, U.S.
- Listed height: 5 ft 9 in (1.75 m)
- Listed weight: 193 lb (88 kg)

Career information
- High school: Elizabeth
- College: Pittsburgh
- NFL draft: 2013: undrafted

Career history
- Houston Texans (2013); Pittsburgh Steelers (2013)*; Houston Texans (2013)
- * Offseason or practice squad member only

Awards and highlights
- 2× First-team All-Big East (2011, 2012)

Career NFL statistics
- Rushing attempts: 4
- Rushing yards: 8
- Receptions: 1
- Receiving yards: 12
- Stats at Pro Football Reference

Raymond E. Graham (born September 18, 1990) is an American former professional football player who was a running back in the National Football League (NFL). He played college football for the Pittsburgh Panthers.

== Early life ==
Graham attended Elizabeth High School in Elizabeth, New Jersey. He was a first team All-Union County, and was Union County Player of the Year after he rushed for 1,592 yards and averaged nine yards per carry, scoring 24 touchdowns to lead Union County with 144 points. He saw limited time as a junior due to a preseason collarbone injury but returned late in the year and rushed for 750 yards and scored 12 touchdowns in Elizabeth's final four games. He rushed for 1,290 yards and 13 TDs as a sophomore. He was a four-year letterman who helped Elizabeth to a 30-12 mark (.714) during his varsity career.

Considered a four-star recruit by Rivals.com, he was rated as the 11th all-purpose back in the nation. He accepted a scholarship from Pittsburgh over offers from Rutgers and Maryland.

== College career ==
As a freshman in 2009, he gained 349 yards, including a 53-yard run against Notre Dame. The USA Today reported that "Graham ran through half of the Notre Dame defense on a 53-yard run that led to his 2-yard score one play later."

As a sophomore in 2010, Graham rushed for 922 yard and averaged 6.2 yards per carry. On October 2, 2010, he had a career-high 277 rushing yards against FIU. His total against FIU was the second-highest in Pitt football history, trailing only Tony Dorsett's 303-yard game against Notre Dame in 1975.

Through seven games of the 2011 season, Graham led the nation in rushing yards with 945 yards and nine touchdowns on 162 carries. He also has 200 receiving yards on 20 receptions. However, his season came to an abrupt end after he sustained a torn right ACL against Connecticut in the second quarter on October 26, 2011.

Graham returned from his injury in 2012, gaining 1,042 rushing yards on 222 carries, with 11 touchdowns, along with 340 receiving yards and two touchdown receptions. Graham put up a personal best for 2012 against National Championship contenders Notre Dame. He recorded 172 yards on 24 attempts averaging 7.2 yards a carry, and 1 touchdown. His efforts helped the Panthers take the game into three overtimes only to come up a field goal shy of a victory.

== Professional career ==
After not being selected in the 2013 NFL draft, Graham signed with the Houston Texans on April 27, 2013 as an undrafted free agent. He was released on August 26, 2013 and was subsequently signed to the practice squad by the Steelers on November 19, 2013. On December 25, 2013, the Houston Texans signed him to their 53-man roster. Graham was subsequently cut after training camp in 2014.

== Personal life ==
Graham is the brother of Detroit Lions linebacker Khaseem Greene.
