= Chas Alecxih =

American football player (born 1989)

No. 65, 66, 70, 91
- Position: Defensive tackle

Personal information
- Born: February 10, 1989 (age 37); Lancaster, Pennsylvania, U.S.
- Listed height: 6 ft 4 in (1.93 m)
- Listed weight: 295 lb (134 kg)

Career information
- High school: Millersville (PA) Penn Manor
- College: Pittsburgh
- NFL draft: 2012: undrafted

Career history
- Miami Dolphins (2012–2013)*; Kansas City Chiefs (2014)*; San Diego Chargers (2014–2015)*; Carolina Panthers (2015–2016)
- * Offseason or practice squad member only

Awards and highlights
- Second-team All-Big East (2011)
- Stats at Pro Football Reference

Peter Charles Alecxih III (born February 10, 1989) is an American former football defensive tackle. He played college football at University of Pittsburgh.

== Professional career ==
=== Miami Dolphins ===
Alecxih was signed as an undrafted rookie free agent by Miami on May 4, 2012. He spent the entire season, with the exception of Week 1, on the Dolphins' practice squad.

He was waived with an injury settlement on May 21, 2013.

=== Kansas City Chiefs ===
He was initially signed as a free agent by Kansas City on January 6, 2014. He was waived at the conclusion of organized team activities by the Chiefs on June 19, 2014.

=== San Diego Chargers ===
Alecxih was claimed off waivers by the San Diego Chargers on June 20, 2014. He spent the entire season on the Chargers' practice squad.

The Chargers waived him on March 31, 2015.

=== Carolina Panthers ===
On May 20, 2015, Alecxih signed as a free agent with the Carolina Panthers after attending the team's rookie minicamp as a tryout player. On September 5, 2015, he was released by the Panthers. Two days later, he signed with the Panthers' practice squad.

On February 7, 2016, Alecxih's Panthers played in Super Bowl 50. In the game, the Panthers fell to the Denver Broncos by a score of 24–10.

On February 9, 2016, Alecxih signed a futures contract with the Carolina Panthers.

On August 9, 2016, Alecxih was waived/injured by the Panthers and was placed on injured reserve after clearing waivers.
