= 2011 Connecticut Huskies football team =

American college football season

2011 Connecticut Huskies football
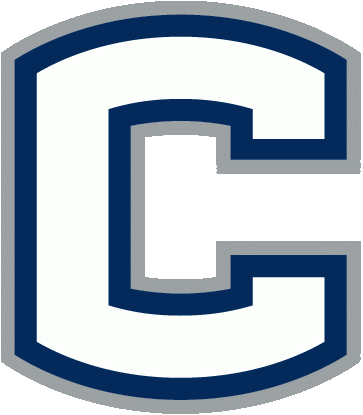
- Conference: Big East Conference
- Record: 5–7 (3–4 Big East)
- Head coach: Paul Pasqualoni (1st season)
- Offensive coordinator: George DeLeone (1st season)
- Offensive scheme: Pro-style
- Defensive coordinator: Don Brown (1st season)
- Base defense: 4–3
- Home stadium: Rentschler Field

2011 Big East Conference football standings
	Conf.			Overall
Team	W		L	W		L
No. 17 West Virginia $+	5	–	2	10	–	3
No. 25 Cincinnati +	5	–	2	10	–	3
Louisville +	5	–	2	7	–	6
Rutgers	4	–	3	9	–	4
Pittsburgh	4	–	3	6	–	7
Connecticut	3	–	4	5	–	7
South Florida	1	–	6	5	–	7
Syracuse	1	–	6	5	–	7
$ – BCS representative as conference champion; + – Conference co-champions; As of January 11, 2012; Rankings from AP Poll

The 2011 Connecticut Huskies football team represented the University of Connecticut as a member of the Big East Conference during the 2011 NCAA Division I FBS football season. Led by first-year head coach Paul Pasqualoni, the Huskies compiled an overall record of 5–7 with a mark of 3–4 in conference play, placing sixth in the Big East. The team played home games at Rentschler Field in East Hartford, Connecticut.

== Schedule ==
Date	Time	Opponent	Site	TV	Result	Attendance
September 3	12:00 pm	Fordham*	Rentschler Field; East Hartford, CT	ESPN3	W 35–3	34,562
September 10	7:30 pm	at Vanderbilt*	Vanderbilt Stadium; Nashville, TN	SNY	L 21–24	32,119
September 16	8:00 pm	Iowa State*	Rentschler Field; East Hartford, CT	ESPN2	L 20–24	37,195
September 24	6:00 pm	at Buffalo*	University at Buffalo Stadium; Buffalo, NY	SNY, Big East Network	W 17–3	18,215
October 1	3:30 pm	Western Michigan*	Rentschler Field; East Hartford, CT	SNY	L 31–38	36,648
October 8	12:00 pm	at No. 16 West Virginia	Milan Puskar Stadium; Morgantown, WV	SNY, Big East Network	L 16–43	56,179
October 15	3:30 pm	South Florida^{†}	Rentschler Field; East Hartford, CT	SNY, Big East Network	W 16–10	37,162
October 26	8:00 pm	at Pittsburgh	Heinz Field; Pittsburgh, PA	ESPN	L 20–35	40,219
November 5	12:00 pm	Syracuse	Rentschler Field; East Hartford, CT (rivalry)	ESPNU	W 28–21	38,769
November 19	12:00 pm	Louisville	Rentschler Field; East Hartford, CT	Big East Network	L 20–34	34,483
November 26	12:00 pm	Rutgers	Rentschler Field; East Hartford, CT	ESPN2	W 40–22	37,857
December 3	12:00 pm	at Cincinnati	Nippert Stadium; Cincinnati, OH	ESPN	L 27–35	27,930
*Non-conference game; ^{†}Homecoming; Rankings from AP Poll released prior to the game; All times are in Eastern time

== Before the season ==
=== Coaching changes ===
The day after the Fiesta Bowl Head Coach Randy Edsall left the University to accept the same position at Maryland. Paul Pasqualoni was hired to replace Edsall. George DeLeone was brought in as the new offensive coordinator, with former offensive coordinator and quarterbacks coach Joe Moorhead being demoted to quarterbacks coach. Don Brown was brought in to replace Todd Orlando at defensive coordinator. Orlando left to take the same position at Florida International.

=== Roster changes ===
The Huskies lost six starters from the 2010 team to graduation. In addition to the graduation losses All-American RB Jordan Todman entered the NFL draft a year early.

=== Recruiting ===
On February 2, 2011, Paul Pasqualoni announced that 16 student-athletes had signed a National Letter of Intent to attend Connecticut. Four; Kenton Adeyemi, Dalton Gifford, Michael Nebrich and Sean McQuillan; entered school in January to participate in spring practice.

College recruiting (2011)
Name	Hometown	School	Height	Weight	40^{‡}	Commit date
Kamal Abrams; WR	Dover, DE	Dover HS	6 ft 0 in (1.83 m)	178 lb (81 kg)	–	Jul 11, 2011
Kamal Abrams; WR	Recruit ratings: Scout: Rivals: (74)					
Andrew Adams; FS	Fayetteville, GA	Woodward Academy	5 ft 11 in (1.80 m)	185 lb (84 kg)	4.57	Dec 30, 2010
Andrew Adams; FS	Recruit ratings: Scout: Rivals: (66)					
Kenton Adeyemi; DT	Wethersfield, CT	Fork Union Military Academy	6 ft 4 in (1.93 m)	255 lb (116 kg)	–	Dec 20, 2010
Kenton Adeyemi; DT	Recruit ratings: Scout: Rivals: (74)					
Jefferson Ashiru; LB	Powder Springs, GA	McEachern HS	6 ft 3 in (1.91 m)	230 lb (100 kg)	4.7	Jan 27, 2011
Jefferson Ashiru; LB	Recruit ratings: Scout: Rivals: (78)					
Julian Campenni; DT	West Pittson, PA	Wyoming Area HS	6 ft 0 in (1.83 m)	285 lb (129 kg)	–	Jan 30, 2011
Julian Campenni; DT	Recruit ratings: Scout: Rivals: (75)					
Tyree Clark; CB	Tampa, FL	Alonso HS	5 ft 10 in (1.78 m)	170 lb (77 kg)	–	Sep 23, 2010
Tyree Clark; CB	Recruit ratings: Scout: Rivals: (74)					
Max DeLorenzo; RB	Berlin, CT	Berlin HS	6 ft 0 in (1.83 m)	200 lb (91 kg)	4.5	Jun 23, 2010
Max DeLorenzo; RB	Recruit ratings: Scout: Rivals: (67)					
Deshon Foxx; RB	Lynchburg, VA	Brookfield HS	5 ft 10 in (1.78 m)	175 lb (79 kg)	4.4	Nov 29, 2010
Deshon Foxx; RB	Recruit ratings: Scout: Rivals: (45)					
Dalton Gifford; OT	Fairhaven, MA	Bridgton Academy	6 ft 5 in (1.96 m)	275 lb (125 kg)	–	Nov 28, 2010
Dalton Gifford; OT	Recruit ratings: Scout: Rivals: (72)					
Xavier Hemingway; OT	Powder Springs, GA	McEachern HS	6 ft 4 in (1.93 m)	255 lb (116 kg)	–	Jan 24, 2011
Xavier Hemingway; OT	Recruit ratings: Scout: Rivals: (77)					
Wilbert Lee; SS	Brooklyn, NY	Boys and Girls HS	6 ft 1 in (1.85 m)	205 lb (93 kg)	–	Jul 17, 2010
Wilbert Lee; SS	Recruit ratings: Scout: Rivals: (45)					
Sean McQuillan; TE	Glastonbury, CT	Avon Old Farms	6 ft 2 in (1.88 m)	252 lb (114 kg)	4.6	Aug 24, 2010
Sean McQuillan; TE	Recruit ratings: Scout: Rivals: (74)					
Michael Nebrich; QB	Fairfax Station, VA	Lake Braddock Secondary School	6 ft 1 in (1.85 m)	190 lb (86 kg)	4.5	Jun 6, 2010
Michael Nebrich; QB	Recruit ratings: Scout: Rivals: (74)					
Paul Nwokeji; OT	Randolph, MA	Thayer Academy	6 ft 5 in (1.96 m)	265 lb (120 kg)	–	Jun 22, 2010
Paul Nwokeji; OT	Recruit ratings: Scout: Rivals: (45)					
David Stephenson; CB	Stone Mountain, GA	Stephenson HS	5 ft 9 in (1.75 m)	175 lb (79 kg)	4.5	Jun 23, 2010
David Stephenson; CB	Recruit ratings: Scout: Rivals: (74)					
Marquise Vann; LB	Cincinnati, OH	Fairfield Senior HS	6 ft 0 in (1.83 m)	223 lb (101 kg)	–	Dec 16, 2010
Marquise Vann; LB	Recruit ratings: Scout: Rivals: (78)					
Overall recruit ranking: Scout: 79 Rivals: >50
‡ Refers to 40-yard dash; Note: In many cases, Scout, Rivals, 247Sports, On3, and ESPN may conflict in their listings of height, weight and 40 time.; In these cases, the average was taken. ESPN grades are on a 100-point scale.; Sources: "Connecticut Football Commitment List (16)". Rivals.; "UConn College Football Recruiting Commits". Scout.; "Connecticut Huskies Commits". ESPN.; "Scout.com Team Recruiting Rankings". Scout.; "2011 Team Ranking". Rivals.com.

== Game summaries ==
=== Fordham ===
Team	1	2	3	4	Total
Rams	0	0	3	0	3
• Huskies	7	14	14	0	35

- Date: September 3, 2011
- Location: Rentschler Field
  East Hartford, CT
- Game start: 12:00 pm EST
- TV announcers (ESPN3): Bob Picozzi, Christian Fauria

This game was originally scheduled to be played on September 1 at 7:30 pm. However, due to Rentschler Field being used for relief efforts for Hurricane Irene, the game was moved to Saturday. The team discussed playing the game at the Yale Bowl in New Haven if the field did not become available in time, but on Wednesday, August 31, the team announced the game would be played in East Hartford on Saturday at noon.

=== Vanderbilt ===
Team	1	2	3	4	Total
Huskies	3	0	10	8	21
• Commodores	14	0	0	10	24

- Date: September 10
- Location: Vanderbilt Stadium
  Nashville, TN
- Game start: 7:30 pm EST
- Game attendance: 32,119
- TV announcers (SNY): Matt Stewart, Chris Doering, Sandra Golden

=== Iowa State ===
Team	1	2	3	4	Total
• Cyclones	0	7	10	7	24
Huskies	10	0	3	7	20

- Date: September 16
- Location: Rentschler Field
  East Hartford, CT
- Game start: 8:00 pm EST
- TV announcers (ESPN2): Mike Gleason, John Congemi

=== Buffalo ===
Team	1	2	3	4	Total
• Huskies	0	10	0	7	17
Bulls	0	3	0	0	3

- Date: September 24
- Location: University at Buffalo Stadium
  Buffalo, NY
- Game start: 6:00 pm EST
- TV announcers (SNY/Big East Network/ESPN+): Jim Barbar, John Gregory

=== Western Michigan ===
Team	1	2	3	4	Total
• Broncos	0	17	0	21	38
Huskies	0	7	10	14	31

- Date: October 1
- Location: Rentschler Field
  East Hartford, CT
- Game start: 3:30 pm EST
- TV announcers (SNY/Big East Network): Bob Picozzi, John Bunting

=== West Virginia ===
Team	1	2	3	4	Total
Huskies	3	6	0	7	16
• No. 16 Mountaineers	3	7	23	10	43

- Date: October 8
- Location: Mountaineer Field
  Morgantown, WV
- Game start: 12:00 pm EST
- TV announcers (SNY/Big East Network): Mike Gleason, John Congemi, Eamon McAnaney

=== South Florida ===
Team	1	2	3	4	Total
Bulls	3	0	7	0	10
• Huskies	3	3	10	0	16

- Date: October 15
- Location: Rentschler Field
  East Hartford, CT
- Game start: 3:30 EST
- TV announcers (Big East Network): Jim Barbar, Christian Fauria

=== Pittsburgh ===
Team	1	2	3	4	Total
Huskies	0	3	10	7	20
• Panthers	14	7	7	7	35

- Date: October 26
- Location: Heinz Field
  Pittsburgh, PA
- TV announcers (ESPN): Joe Tessitore, Mark May, Lou Holtz, Quint Kessenich

=== Syracuse ===
Team	1	2	3	4	Total
Orange	0	7	14	0	21
• Huskies	7	0	7	14	28

- Date: November 5
- Location: Rentschler Field
  East Hartford, CT
- TV announcers (ESPNU): Pam Ward, Dan Hawkins

=== Louisville ===
Team	1	2	3	4	Total
• Cardinals	14	0	7	13	34
Huskies	0	10	0	10	20

- Date: November 19
- Location: Rentschler Field
  East Hartford, CT
- Game start: 12:00 EST
- Game attendance: 34,483
- TV announcers (Big East Network): Mike Gleason, John Congemi, Eamon McAnaney

=== Rutgers ===
Team	1	2	3	4	Total
Scarlet Knights	0	10	0	12	22
• Huskies	14	10	16	0	40

- Date: November 26
- Location: Rentschler Field
  East Hartford, CT
- Game start: 12:00 EST
- TV announcers (ESPN2): Beth Mowins, Mike Bellotti

=== Cincinnati ===
Team	1	2	3	4	Total
Huskies	0	6	6	15	27
• Bearcats	14	14	7	0	35

- Date: December 3
- Location: Nippert Stadium
  Cincinnati, OH
- Game start: 12:00 EST
- TV announcers (ESPN/ESPN2): Dave Pasch, Chris Spielman, Quint Kessenich

== NFL draft ==
The following Husky was selected in the 2012 NFL draft following the season

Round	Pick	Player	Position	NFL team
2	49	Kendall Reyes	Defensive tackle	San Diego Chargers
