= 2011 West Virginia Mountaineers football team =

American college football season

2011 West Virginia Mountaineers football

Big East co–champion Lambert-Meadowlands Trophy Orange Bowl champion

Orange Bowl, W 70–33 vs. Clemson
- Conference: Big East Conference

Ranking
- Coaches: No. 18
- AP: No. 17
- Record: 10–3 (5–2 Big East)
- Head coach: Dana Holgorsen (1st season)
- Offensive scheme: Air raid
- Defensive coordinator: Jeff Casteel (10th season)
- Base defense: 3–3–5
- Captains: Geno Smith; Don Barclay; Najee Goode; Keith Tandy
- Home stadium: Milan Puskar Stadium

2011 Big East Conference football standings
	Conf.			Overall
Team	W		L	W		L
No. 17 West Virginia $+	5	–	2	10	–	3
No. 25 Cincinnati +	5	–	2	10	–	3
Louisville +	5	–	2	7	–	6
Rutgers	4	–	3	9	–	4
Pittsburgh	4	–	3	6	–	7
Connecticut	3	–	4	5	–	7
South Florida	1	–	6	5	–	7
Syracuse	1	–	6	5	–	7
$ – BCS representative as conference champion; + – Conference co-champions; As of January 11, 2012; Rankings from AP Poll

The 2011 West Virginia Mountaineers football team represented West Virginia University as a member of the Big East Conference during the 2011 NCAA Division I FBS football season. Led by first-year head coach Dana Holgorsen, the Mountaineers compiled an overall record of 10–3 with a mark of 5–2 in conference play, sharing the Big East title with Cincinnati and Louisville. West Virginia earned the conference's Bowl Championship Series (BCS) as the highest ranked of the Big East co-champions in the final BCS rankings. The Mountaineers were invited to the Orange Bowl, where they beat Clemson, 70–33. This was the third victory for West Virginia in three BCS games, while the 70 points in the Orange Bowl set a record for most points scored in any bowl game; this was later matched by Army in the 2018 Armed Forces Bowl. The team played home games at Milan Puskar Stadium in Morgantown, West Virginia.

The 2011 season was West Virginia's last in the Big East as the Mountaineers joined the Big 12 Conference in 2012.

== Schedule ==
Date	Time	Opponent	Rank	Site	TV	Result	Attendance	Source
September 4	3:30 p.m.	Marshall*	No. 19	Milan Puskar Stadium; Morgantown, WV (Friends of Coal Bowl)	ESPN	W 34–13	60,758	
September 10	1:00 p.m.	Norfolk State*	No. 19	Mountaineer Field; Morgantown, WV	Big East Network	W 55–12	51,911	
September 17	12:00 p.m.	at Maryland*	No. 18	Byrd Stadium; College Park, MD (rivalry)	ESPNU	W 37–31	53,627	
September 24	8:00 p.m.	No. 2 LSU*	No. 16	Mountaineer Field; Morgantown, WV (College GameDay)	ABC	L 21–47	62,056	
October 1	3:30 p.m.	Bowling Green*^{†}	No. 22	Mountaineer Field; Morgantown, WV	ESPN Plus	W 55–10	46,603	
October 8	12:00 p.m.	Connecticut	No. 16	Mountaineer Field; Morgantown, WV	Big East Network	W 43–16	56,179	
October 21	8:00 p.m.	at Syracuse	No. 11	Carrier Dome; Syracuse, NY (rivalry)	ESPN	L 23–49	45,265	
October 29	3:30 p.m.	at Rutgers	No. 25	High Point Solutions Stadium; Piscataway, NJ	ABC	W 41–31	47,303	
November 5	12:00 p.m.	Louisville	No. 24	Mountaineer Field; Morgantown, WV	Big East Network	L 35–38	57,287	
November 12	12:00 p.m.	at No. 22 Cincinnati		Paul Brown Stadium; Cincinnati, OH (rivalry)	ABC/ESPN3	W 24–21	48,152	
November 25	7:00 p.m.	Pittsburgh		Mountaineer Field; Morgantown, WV (Backyard Brawl)	ESPN	W 21–20	60,932	
December 1	8:00 p.m.	at South Florida	No. 22	Raymond James Stadium; Tampa, FL	ESPN	W 30–27	41,743	
January 4, 2012	8:30 p.m.	vs. No. 14 Clemson*	No. 23	Sun Life Stadium; Miami Gardens, FL (Orange Bowl, College GameDay)	ESPN	W 70–33	67,563	
*Non-conference game; ^{†}Homecoming; Rankings from AP Poll; All times are in Eastern time

== Rankings ==
Ranking movements Legend: ██ Increase in ranking ██ Decrease in ranking — = Not ranked RV = Received votes
	Week															
Poll	Pre	1	2	3	4	5	6	7	8	9	10	11	12	13	14	Final
AP	24	19	18	16	22	16	13	11	25	24	RV	RV	RV	22	23	17
Coaches	RV	24	20	16	23	19	16	14	24	21	RV	23	23	20	22	18
Harris	Not released						16	14	23	22	RV	22	24	21	22	Not released
BCS	Not released							15	25	24	—	—	—	23	23	Not released

== Preseason ==
=== Coaching changes ===
On December 16, 2010, West Virginia announced the hiring of former Oklahoma State offensive coordinator Dana Holgorsen. Holgorsen replaces Jeff Mullen as offensive coordinator and will take over as the Mountaineers head coach in 2012.

On January 5, 2011, the Mountaineers announced the hiring of three offensive coaches; Robert Gillespie (Running Backs), Bill Bedenbaugh (Offensive Line), and Shannon Dawson (Inside-Receivers).

On March 10, it was announced that lone offensive staff holdover Lonnie Galloway (Outside-Receivers) has left West Virginia to take a coaching job at Wake Forest.

On March 28, West Virginia University announced the hiring of Daron Roberts as an assistant coach. Roberts will be working with wide receivers and special teams.

On June 10, West Virginia University announced that Bill Stewart had resigned as head coach and that Dana Holgorsen would assume the position effective immediately. Holgorsen has stated he will serve as his own offensive coordinator but that he was unsure who would fill the extra spot on the coaching staff.

On July 8, Holgorsen hired Alex Hammond as recruiting coordinator.

The Mountaineers have retained the entire 2010 defensive coaching staff for the 2011 season.

=== Key losses ===
- Noel Devine – RB
- Jock Sanders – WR
- Eric Jobe – OL
- Scooter Berry – DT
- Chris Neild – DT
- Pat Lazear – LB
- J.T. Thomas – LB
- Anthony Leonard – LB
- Brandon Hogan – CB
- Robert Sands – S
- Benji Powers- DB

=== 2011 recruits ===
College recruiting (2011)
Name	Hometown	School	Height	Weight	40^{‡}	Commit date
Brian Athey; QB	Eden Prairie, MN	Eden Prairie Sr.	6 ft 4 in (1.93 m)	215 lb (98 kg)	4.8	Jul 11, 2010
Brian Athey; QB	Recruit ratings: Scout: Rivals: (73)					
Jared Barber; MLB	Mocksville, NC	Davie County	6 ft 1 in (1.85 m)	215 lb (98 kg)	4.65	Jul 28, 2010
Jared Barber; MLB	Recruit ratings: Scout: Rivals: (76)					
Ben Bradley; DT	Norcross, GA	Norcross	6 ft 3 in (1.91 m)	275 lb (125 kg)	5.2	Sep 8, 2010
Ben Bradley; DT	Recruit ratings: Scout: Rivals: (75)					
Isaiah Bruce; MLB	Riverview, Duval County, Florida	Providence Christian	6 ft 2 in (1.88 m)	215 lb (98 kg)	4.6	Jan 11, 2011
Isaiah Bruce; MLB	Recruit ratings: Scout: Rivals: (77)					
Andrew Buie; RB	Jacksonville, FL	Trinity Christian	5 ft 9 in (1.75 m)	190 lb (86 kg)	4.45	Jan 23, 2011
Andrew Buie; RB	Recruit ratings: Scout: Rivals: (78)					
Dante Campbell; WR	Clermont, FL	East Ridge	6 ft 5 in (1.96 m)	205 lb (93 kg)	4.5	Jul 27, 2010
Dante Campbell; WR	Recruit ratings: Scout: Rivals: (78)					
Terrell Chestnut; DB	Pottstown, PA	Pottsgrove	6 ft 0 in (1.83 m)	177 lb (80 kg)	4.5	Jan 23, 2011
Terrell Chestnut; DB	Recruit ratings: Scout: Rivals: (78)					
Cody Clay; TE	Charleston, WV	George Washington	6 ft 4 in (1.93 m)	250 lb (110 kg)	4.85	Jun 20, 2010
Cody Clay; TE	Recruit ratings: Scout: Rivals: (75)					
Joshua Francis; OLB	Scranton, PA	Lackawanna CC	6 ft 2 in (1.88 m)	215 lb (98 kg)	4.55	Dec 7, 2010
Joshua Francis; OLB	Recruit ratings: Scout: Rivals: (–)					
Dustin Garrison; RB	Pearland, TX	Pearland	5 ft 8 in (1.73 m)	165 lb (75 kg)	4.5	Jan 16, 2011
Dustin Garrison; RB	Recruit ratings: Scout: Rivals: (76)					
Russell Haughton-James; OL	Plantation, FL	American Heritage	6 ft 6 in (1.98 m)	280 lb (130 kg)	5.0	Jan 19, 2011
Russell Haughton-James; OL	Recruit ratings: Scout: Rivals: (74)					
Brandon Jackson; OL	Lakewood, OH	St. Edward	6 ft 4 in (1.93 m)	320 lb (150 kg)	5.3	Jan 16, 2011
Brandon Jackson; OL	Recruit ratings: Scout: Rivals: (68)					
Justin Johnson; OL	Parkersburg, WV	Parkersburg	6 ft 4 in (1.93 m)	288 lb (131 kg)	5.3	Sep 4, 2010
Justin Johnson; OL	Recruit ratings: Scout: Rivals: (77)					
Nick Kwiatkoski; DB	Bethel Park, PA	Bethel Park	6 ft 2 in (1.88 m)	215 lb (98 kg)	4.5	Jul 28, 2010
Nick Kwiatkoski; DB	Recruit ratings: Scout: Rivals: (76)					
Marquis Lucas; OL	Miami, FL	Miami Central	6 ft 4 in (1.93 m)	310 lb (140 kg)	–	Feb 2, 2011
Marquis Lucas; OL	Recruit ratings: Scout: Rivals: (75)					
Paul Millard; QB	Flower Mound, TX	Flower Mound	6 ft 2 in (1.88 m)	205 lb (93 kg)	4.75	Jan 10, 2011
Paul Millard; QB	Recruit ratings: Scout: Rivals: (74)					
Kenneth Myers; WR	Jacksonville, FL	First Coast	6 ft 2 in (1.88 m)	185 lb (84 kg)	4.55	Oct 9, 2010
Kenneth Myers; WR	Recruit ratings: Scout: Rivals: (77)					
Shaquille Petteway; LB	Steubenville, OH	Steubenville	6 ft 0 in (1.83 m)	200 lb (91 kg)	4.5	Oct 9, 2010
Shaquille Petteway; LB	Recruit ratings: Scout: Rivals: (75)					
Vance Roberts; DB	Washington, DC	Dunbar	5 ft 10 in (1.78 m)	185 lb (84 kg)	4.56	Jul 1, 2010
Vance Roberts; DB	Recruit ratings: Scout: Rivals: (78)					
Vernard Roberts; RB	Washington, DC	Dunbar	5 ft 11 in (1.80 m)	185 lb (84 kg)	4.6	Jul 1, 2010
Vernard Roberts; RB	Recruit ratings: Scout: Rivals: (75)					
Kyle Rose; DE	Centerville, OH	Centerville	6 ft 4 in (1.93 m)	240 lb (110 kg)	4.8	Jul 6, 2010
Kyle Rose; DE	Recruit ratings: Scout: Rivals: (77)					
Shaq Rowell; DT	Council Bluffs, IA	Iowa Western CC	6 ft 4 in (1.93 m)	308 lb (140 kg)	5.4	Dec 27, 2010
Shaq Rowell; DT	Recruit ratings: Scout: Rivals: (–)					
Overall recruit ranking: Scout: 53 Rivals: 46
‡ Refers to 40-yard dash; Note: In many cases, Scout, Rivals, 247Sports, On3, and ESPN may conflict in their listings of height, weight and 40 time.; In these cases, the average was taken. ESPN grades are on a 100-point scale.; Sources: "West Virginia 2011 Football Commitments". Rivals.; "2011 West Virginia Commits". Scout.; "2011 Player Commitments – West Virginia". ESPN.; "Scout.com Team Recruiting Rankings". Scout.; "2011 Team Ranking". Rivals.com.

=== Spring Game ===
The 2011 Gold-Blue Spring Game took place on Friday, April 29, 2011, at 7 p.m. at Mountaineer Field. Over 22,000 fans attended to see the Gold team defeat the Blue team 83–17. The game was televised statewide on West Virginia Media stations.

=== Polls ===
The Mountaineers were picked to win the Big East Conference by the media at conference media day, picking up 21 out of 24 first place votes.

== Game summaries ==
=== Marshall ===
Team	1	2	3	4	Total
Thundering Herd	7	3	3	0	13
• No. 19 Mountaineers	3	17	7	7	34

- Date: September 4
- Location: Mountaineer Field
  Morgantown, West Virginia
- Game start: 3:30 pm EDT
- Game attendance: 60,758
- TV announcers (ESPN): Joe Tessitore & Rod Gilmore

WVU picked up the win in a game that was delayed a total of 4 hours, 22 minutes and called with 14:36 left in the 4th quarter. Following a 3rd quarter Tavon Austin kickoff return for a touchdown that gave the Mountaineers a 27–13 lead with five minutes to play in the third quarter, the game experienced a lightning delay that lasted 3 hours, 6 minutes. Once resuming play a Vernard Roberts one-yard touchdown run extended the WVU lead to 34–13 early in the fourth quarter, after which the game was once again delayed for lightning. It was ultimately agreed to by both teams to end the game. Geno Smith lead the game for WVU going 26–35 for 246 yards and two touchdowns.

=== Norfolk State ===
Team	1	2	3	4	Total
Spartans	3	9	0	0	12
• No. 19 Mountaineers	0	10	28	17	55

- Date: September 10
- Location: Mountaineer Field
  Morgantown, West Virgina
- Game start: 1:00 pm EDT
- Game attendance: 51,911
- TV announcers (Big East Network): Rob King & John Thornton

The Mountaineers overcame a sluggish first half exploding for 45 second half points and ending the game with 533 yards of total offense. Geno Smith went 20–34 for 371 yards and 4 TDs passing. As a team WVU passed for 431 yards, the most since 1998.

=== At Maryland ===
Team	1	2	3	4	Total
• No. 18 Mountaineers	14	13	7	3	37
Terrapins	3	7	13	8	31

- Date: September 17
- Location: Byrd Stadium
  College Park, Maryland
- Game start: 12:00 p.m. EDT
- Elapsed time: 3:28
- Game attendance: 53,627
- Game weather: Cloudy
- Referee: Dennis Hennigan
- TV announcers (ESPNU): Rob Stone & Danny Kanell

The Mountaineers got off to a fast start, building a 27–10 halftime lead behind the arm of junior quarterback Geno Smith and rushing touchdowns from freshmen Vernard Roberts and Andrew Buie. The lead was built to 24, 34–10, in the third quarter on a Smith connection to high school teammate Stedman Bailey. Maryland scored 21 unanswered points to bring the game to within 3 points, 34–31, before the Mountaineers added another field goal to build their lead to 6, 37–31. The Terrapins drove down the field in an attempt to take the lead, but quarterback Danny O'Brien was intercepted by Eain Smith with 1:13 remaining in the game to seal it for the Mountaineers.

=== No. 2 LSU ===
Team	1	2	3	4	Total
• No. 2 Tigers	13	14	7	13	47
No. 16 Mountaineers	0	7	14	0	21

- Date: September 24
- Location: Mountaineer Field
  Morgantown, West Virginia
- Game start: 8:00 pm EDT
- Game attendance: 62,056
- TV announcers (ABC): Brent Musburger & Kirk Herbstreit

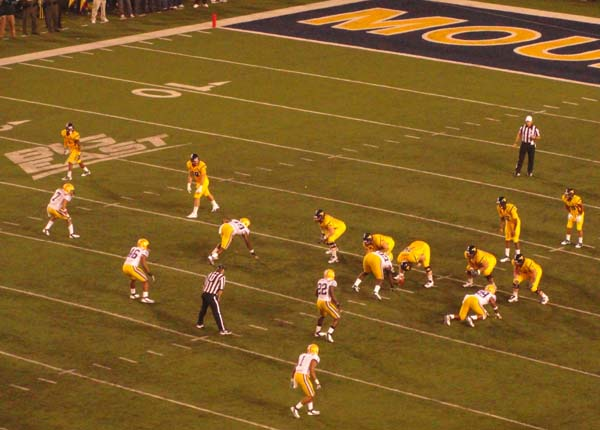
West Virginia on offense in the first half.

ESPN's College GameDay broadcast from Morgantown for the first time.

Despite outgaining the Tigers 533–366, West Virginia was unable to overcome poor tackling and special teams play. The Mountaineers also committed four turnovers. West Virginia's Geno Smith set school records for completions (38), attempts (65) and passing yards (463) against LSU's highly regarded defense.

=== Bowling Green ===
Team	1	2	3	4	Total
Falcons	10	0	0	0	10
• No. 22 Mountaineers	17	21	10	7	55

- Date: October 1
- Location: Mountaineer Field
  Morgantown, West Virginia
- Game start: 3:30 pm EDT
- Game attendance: 46,603
- TV announcers (Big East Network): Rob King & John Thornton

West Virginia put together its most complete game of the season as the running game that had struggled in past weeks exploded to the tune of 360. True freshman Dustin Garrison set a school record for most rushing yards by a freshman with 291, good enough for a tie for the second most total in school history. WVU's 643 yards of total offense were a Mountaineer Field record.

=== Connecticut ===
Team	1	2	3	4	Total
Huskies	3	6	0	7	16
• No. 16 Mountaineers	3	7	23	10	43

- Date: October 8
- Location: Mountaineer Field
  Morgantown, West Virginia
- Game start: 12:00 p.m. EDT
- Game attendance: 56,179
- Television network: ESPN+

=== At Syracuse ===
Team	1	2	3	4	Total
No. 11 Mountaineers	3	6	7	7	23
• Orange	7	14	14	14	49

- Date: October 21
- Location: Carrier Dome
  Syracuse, New York
- Game start: 8:00 pm EDT
- Game attendance: 45,265
- Game weather: None (played indoors)
- Television network: ESPN

=== At Rutgers ===
Team	1	2	3	4	Total
• No. 25 Mountaineers	14	7	7	13	41
Scarlet Knights	17	14	0	0	31

- Date: October 29
- Location: High Point Solutions Stadium
  Piscataway, New Jersey
- Game start: 3:30 pm EDT
- Game attendance: 47,303
- Game weather: Snow
- Television network: ABC

Geno Smith threw two second-half touchdowns to help West Virginia (6–2, 2–1 Big East) post its 17th straight win over Rutgers. WVU trailed 31–21 at the halftime, fighting both the Scarlet Knights offense, and harsh weather conditions. The Mountaineer defense allowed a season-high 31 points in the first half, but shutout Rutgers in the second. The Mountaineers won their first conference road game of the season, and became bowl-eligible in the process. Smith finished 20–33 for 218 yards, and two touchdowns, while Shawne Alston ran for a career-high 110 yards and two scores on 14 carries

=== Louisville ===
Team	1	2	3	4	Total
• Cardinals	14	7	3	14	38
No. 24 Mountaineers	7	14	0	14	35

- Date: November 5
- Location: Mountaineer Field
  Morgantown, West Virginia
- Game start: 12:00 p.m. EDT
- Game attendance: 57,287
- Television network: Big East Network

=== At No. 22 Cincinnati ===
Team	1	2	3	4	Total
• Mountaineers	7	10	0	7	24
No. 22 Bearcats	7	0	7	7	21

- Date: November 12
- Location: Paul Brown Stadium
  Cincinnati, Ohio
- Game start: Noon EST
- Game attendance: 48,152
- Television network: ABC/ESPN3

=== Pittsburgh ===
Team	1	2	3	4	Total
Panthers	14	3	3	0	20
• Mountaineers	0	7	7	7	21

- Date: November 25
- Location: Mountaineer Field
  Morgantown, West Virginia
- Game start: 7:00 pm EST
- Game attendance: 60,932
- Television network: ESPN

Scoring summary
1	9:05	PITT	Zach Brown 1-yard run (Kevin Harper kick)	PITT 7–0
1	2:14	PITT	Isaac Bennett 6-yard run (Kevin Harper kick)	PITT 14–0
2	7:31	WVU	Steadman Bailey 63-yard pass from Geno Smith (Tyler Bitancourt kick)	PITT 14–7
2	2:53	PITT	Kevin Harper 30-yard field goal	PITT 17–7
3	11:29	PITT	Kevin Harper 27-yard field goal	PITT 20–7
3	8:59	WVU	Shawne Alston 8-yard run (Tyler Bitancourt kick)	PITT 20–14
4	6:10	WVU	Shawne Alston 1-yard run (Tyler Bitancourt kick)	WVU 21–20

=== South Florida ===
Team	1	2	3	4	Total
• No. 22 Mountaineers	0	13	7	10	30
Bulls	0	7	6	14	27

- Date: December 1
- Location: Raymond James Stadium
  Tampa, Florida
- Game start: 8:00 pm EST
- Game attendance: 41,743
- Television network: ESPN

=== Vs. No. 14 Clemson (Orange Bowl) ===
Team	1	2	3	4	Total
• No. 23 Mountaineers	14	35	14	7	70
No. 14 Tigers	17	3	6	7	33

- Date: January 4, 2012
- Location: Sun Life Stadium
  Miami Gardens, Florida
- Game start: 8:30 pm EST
- Game attendance: 67,563
- TV announcers (ESPN): Mike Tirico, Jon Gruden, Ron Jaworski and Lisa Salters

Scoring summary
1	9:33	CLEM	Andre Ellington 68-yard run (Chandler Catanzaro kick)	CLEM 7–0
1	6:54	WVU	Shawne Alston 4-yard run (Tyler Bitancourt kick)	Tied 7–7
1	4:38	CLEM	Sammy Watkins 27-yard pass from Tajh Boyd (Chandler Catanzaro kick)	CLEM 14–7
1	2:49	WVU	Tavon Austin 8-yard pass from Geno Smith (Tyler Bitancourt kick)	Tied 14–14
1	0:45	CLEM	Chandler Catanzaro 42-yard field goal	CLEM 17–14
2	13:25	WVU	Tavon Austin 27-yard pass from Geno Smith (Tyler Bitancourt kick)	WVU 21–17
2	10:28	WVU	Darwin Cook 99-yard fumble return (Tyler Bitancourt kick)	WVU 28–17
2	4:49	CLEM	Chandler Catanzaro 43-yard field goal	WVU 28–20
2	2:29	WVU	Geno Smith 7-yard run (Tyler Bitancourt kick)	WVU 35–20
2	1:13	WVU	Tavon Austin 3-yard pass from Geno Smith (Tyler Bitancourt kick)	WVU 42–20
2	0:04	WVU	Shawne Alston 1-yard run (Tyler Bitancourt kick)	WVU 49–20
3	12:35	WVU	Stedman Bailey 6-yard pass from Geno Smith (Tyler Bitancourt kick)	WVU 56–20
3	9:18	WVU	Tavon Austin 37-yard pass from Geno Smith (Tyler Bitancourt kick)	WVU 63–20
3	1:37	CLEM	DeAndre Hopkins 28-yard pass from Tajh Boyd (pass failed)	WVU 63–26
4	6:21	WVU	Willie Milhouse 7-yard pass from Geno Smith (Tyler Bitancourt kick)	WVU 70–26
4	1:01	CLEM	Roderick McDowell 4-yard run (Chandler Catanzaro kick)	WVU 70–33

Geno Smith tied a record for any bowl game with six touchdown passes, including four to Tavon Austin, and No. 23 West Virginia set a bowl scoring record by beating No. 14 Clemson 70–33 on Wednesday in the Orange Bowl. Darwin Cook's 99-yard fumble return for a touchdown was one of the Mountaineers' five TDs in the second quarter, including three in the final 2:29 for a 49–20 lead. It was the highest-scoring half by a team in a bowl game. Austin's four TD receptions tied a record for any bowl game, and Smith broke Tom Brady's Orange Bowl record with 407 yards passing. West Virginia's point total broke the bowl record established six nights earlier when Baylor beat Washington 67–56 in the Alamo Bowl.

== Personnel ==
=== Coaching staff ===
2011 Coaching Staff
Head coach: Head coach/offensive coordinator – Dana Holgorsen; Offensive coaches: Quarterbacks – Jake Spavital; Running backs – Robert Gillespie; Inside receivers – Shannon Dawson; Wide receivers/special teams – Daron Roberts; Offensive line – Bill Bedenbaugh	Defensive coaches: Defensive coordinator/linebackers – Jeff Casteel; Defensive line – Bill Kirelawich; Defensive backs – David Lockwood; Safeties – Steve Dunlap; Strength and conditioning: Strength and conditioning – Mike Joseph; Assistant strength coach – Mark Smith; Assistant strength coach – Kevin McCadam

=== Roster ===
2011 West Virginia Mountaineers
Quarterbacks: 14 Paul Millard – freshman; 12 Geno Smith – junior; Running backs: 20 Shawne Alston – junior; 32 Ryan Clarke – RS junior; 34 Daquan Hargrett – RS sophomore; 21 Trey Johnson – sophomore; 41 Ricky Kovatch – senior; 38 Matt Lindamood – RS junior; 40 Nate Majnaric – RS freshman; 30 Pete Miller – RS junior; 28 Eric Rollman – RS sophomore; 14 Chris Snook – RS Sophomore; Wide receivers: 1 Tavon Austin – junior; 3 Stedman Bailey – RS sophomore; 23 Dustin Brown – RS freshman; 83 Jack Crossin – RS sophomore; 84 Andrew Goldbaugh – RS junior; 5 Ivan McCartney – sophomore; 83 Willie Milhouse – RS senior; 80 Ryan Nehlen – RS junior; 91 Soraya Alsien-Ogbebar – RS senior; 86 Reggie Rembert – RS junior; 11 Lamar Jones – freshman; 33 Thomas Sims – RS freshman; 2 Brad Starks – RS senior; 89 Tyler Urban – senior; 15 Coley White – RS junior; 81 J.D. Woods – RS junior	Offensive Lineman: 70 Blaise Arbogast – RS sophomore; 64 Don Barclay – RS senior; 60 John Bassler – RS junior; 72 Cole Bowers – RS sophomore; 57 Jeff Braun -RS Junior; 70 Mike Calicchio – RS freshman; 76 Pat Eger – RS sophomore; 77 Josh Jenkins – senior; 79 Nick Kindler – RS sophomore; 74 Joe Madsen – RS junior; 55 Tyler Rader – RS senior; 65 Chad Snodgrass – RS senior; 67 Quinton Spain – RS freshman; Defensive line: 95 Curtis Feight – RS sophomore; 78 C.J. Huffman – RS senior; 97 Julian Miller – RS senior; 62 Donovan Pearson – RS junior; 76 Ted Rietschlin – RS freshman; 94 Josh Taylor – RS senior; 99 Jorge Wright – RS junior; Defensive end: 98 Will Clarke – RS sophomore; 87 Trevor Demko – RS freshman; 11 Bruce Irvin – senior; 91 J.B. Lageman – RS junior	Linebackers: 53 Tyler Anderson – RS sophomore; 33 Jared Barber – freshman; 54 Hunter Bittner – RS junior; 32 Steve Bohon – RS freshman; 51 Josh Contraguerro – RS junior; 30 Josh Francis – junior; 49 Troy Gloster – RS freshman; 52 Najee Goode – RS senior; 42 Donovan Miles – RS junior; 50 Taige Redman – RS sophomore; 47 Doug Rigg – sophomore; 13 Jewone Snow – RS freshman; 43 Casey Vance – RS senior; Defensive backs: 20 Ishmael Banks – RS freshman; 26 Travis Bell – sophomore; 18 Brantwon Bowser – RS senior; 39 Nick Cadwell – RS junior; 25 Darwin Cook – RS sophomore; 33 Michael Dorsey – sophomore; 3 Qudral Forte – RS freshman; 28 Terence Garvin – junior; 17 Lucas Henn – RS freshman; 23 Brodrick Jenkins – RS sophomore; 14 Cecil Level – RS junior; 6 Pat Miller – junior; 22 Vance Roberts – freshman; 35 Lawrence Smith – RS junior; 24 Eain Smith – RS senior; 8 Keith Tandy – RS senior; 16 Wes Tonkery – RS freshman; 15 Anthony Vecchio – RS freshman; 4 Avery Williams – freshman	Special teams: 40 Tyler Bitancurt – RS Junior (K); 69 Jerry Cooper – RS freshman (LS); 46 Trent Lusk – RS junior (LS); 41 Michael Molinari – RS freshman (K); 87 Cody Nutter – RS senior (LS); 44 Corey Smith – RS junior (P); Key: – Currently Injured; (redshirt) – Current redshirt; I* – Ineligible
