= Tyrone Ezell =

American football player (born 1990)

No. 97
- Position: Defensive end

Personal information
- Born: January 30, 1990 (age 36); Munhall, Pennsylvania, U.S.
- Listed height: 6 ft 4 in (1.93 m)
- Listed weight: 305 lb (138 kg)

Career information
- High school: Munhall (PA) Steel Valley
- College: Pittsburgh
- NFL draft: 2014: undrafted

Career history
- Houston Texans (2014)*; New Orleans Saints (2014)*; Lehigh Valley Steelhawks (2018–?)
- * Offseason or practice squad member only

Tyrone Albert Franklin Ezell is an American former football defensive end. He went undrafted in 2014 but was signed after the draft by the Houston Texans.

== College ==
Ezell played in all 13 games, 12 as a starter, where he collected 34 tackles. In his final game, he sacked the opposing team's quarterback that all but won the game for Pitt 30-27

== Pro career ==
=== Houston Texans ===
Ezell signed as an undrafted free agent right after the 2014 NFL draft, joining college teammate Tom Savage.

== Wrestling career ==
Ezell said he wanted to be a WWE wrestler if he couldn't make an NFL team.
