= J. K. Schaffer =

American football player (born 1990)

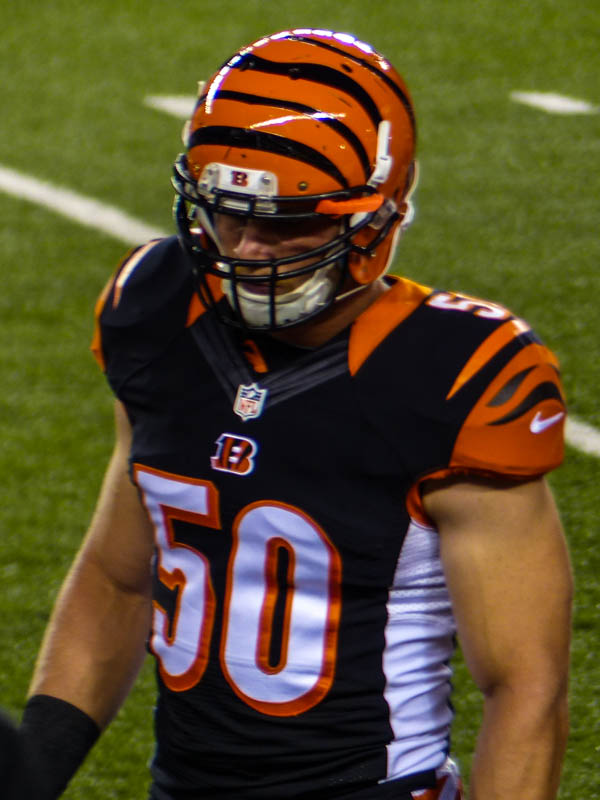
- Schaffer with the Cincinnati Bengals

No. 50
- Position: Linebacker

Personal information
- Born: June 10, 1990 (age 36); Cincinnati, Ohio, U.S.
- Listed height: 6 ft 1 in (1.85 m)
- Listed weight: 232 lb (105 kg)

Career information
- High school: La Salle (Cincinnati)
- College: Cincinnati
- NFL draft: 2012: undrafted

Career history
- Jacksonville Jaguars (2012)*; Tampa Bay Buccaneers (2012)*; Cincinnati Bengals (2012–2014)
- * Offseason or practice squad member only

Awards and highlights
- First-team All-Big East (2011); Second-team All-Big East (2010)

Career NFL statistics
- Total tackles: 7
- Stats at Pro Football Reference

Jerome Kyle "J. K." Schaffer (born June 10, 1990) is an American former professional football player who was a linebacker in the National Football League (NFL). He played college football for the Cincinnati Bearcats. He signed as an undrafted free agent with the Jaguars in 2012 and has also played for the Cincinnati Bengals.

== College career ==
Schaffer played linebacker at the University of Cincinnati for the Bearcats. The 2011 American Eagle Outfitters BIG EAST Conference Football Scholar-Athlete of the Year, he was a two-year captain during Cincinnati's most prosperous run in program history. He is just the fourth player in BIG EAST history to register at least 100 tackles in three consecutive seasons, culminating in a career-high 114 stops in the 2011 season.

A three-year starter, two-time all-conference player and a member of three BIG EAST Championship teams, Schaffer had 337 career tackles, leading all BIG EAST players who were active in 2011. He finished his career with 27.5 tackles for loss, 15 pass breakups, six forced fumbles and two fumble recoveries. He earned First-team All-BIG EAST honors in 2011 after he ranked third in the conference in tackles (8.8 per game), had four sacks and led a Cincinnati unit that led the nation in sacks (8.6 per game) and was sixth nationally in rushing defense (96.2 ypg). He was an All-BIG EAST Second-team choice in 2010.

Schaffer was a key contributor for three BIG EAST championship teams - the 2008 and 2009 squads that won outright titles and played in consecutive Bowl Championship Series games and the 2011 team that won a share of the championship and ended the year with a win in the AutoZone Liberty Bowl.

== Professional career ==
Schaffer is an undrafted rookie for the Cincinnati Bengals. Schaffer was a free agent, after being released from the Tampa Bay Buccaneers practice squad. On November 5, 2012, Schaffer was signed to the Cincinnati Bengals practice squad. He was signed to the active roster on September 16, 2013, taking Jeromy Miles's spot on the roster. Schaffer participated in 12 games in 2013, including play-off loss to San Diego. Schaffer recorded 9 total tackles in 2013. The Bengals waived/injured Schaffer on August 26, 2014.

== Personal life ==
Schaffer was arrested in February 2017 for assault and public indecency. He was sentenced to 180 days in jail, but later granted probation.
