= 2011 Rutgers Scarlet Knights football team =

American college football season

2011 Rutgers Scarlet Knights football
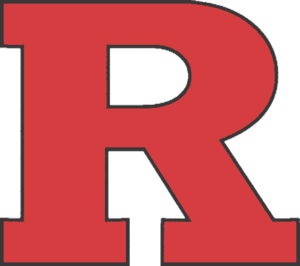

Pinstripe Bowl champion

Pinstripe Bowl, W 27–13 vs. Iowa State
- Conference: Big East Conference
- Record: 9–4 (4–3 Big East)
- Head coach: Greg Schiano (11th season)
- Offensive coordinator: Frank Cignetti, Jr. (1st season)
- Offensive scheme: Pro-style
- Defensive coordinator: Bob Fraser (3rd season)
- Base defense: 4–3
- Home stadium: High Point Solutions Stadium

2011 Big East Conference football standings
	Conf.			Overall
Team	W		L	W		L
No. 17 West Virginia $+	5	–	2	10	–	3
No. 25 Cincinnati +	5	–	2	10	–	3
Louisville +	5	–	2	7	–	6
Rutgers	4	–	3	9	–	4
Pittsburgh	4	–	3	6	–	7
Connecticut	3	–	4	5	–	7
South Florida	1	–	6	5	–	7
Syracuse	1	–	6	5	–	7
$ – BCS representative as conference champion; + – Conference co-champions; As of January 11, 2012; Rankings from AP Poll

The 2011 Rutgers Scarlet Knights football team represented Rutgers University in the 2011 NCAA Division I FBS football season. The Scarlet Knights were led by 11th year head coach Greg Schiano and played their home games at High Point Solutions Stadium. They are a member of the Big East Conference. They finished the season 9–4, 4–3 in Big East play to finish in a tie for fourth place. They were invited to the Pinstripe Bowl where they defeated Iowa State 27–13.

== Schedule ==
Date	Time	Opponent	Site	TV	Result	Attendance
September 1	7:30 pm	North Carolina Central*	High Point Solutions Stadium; Piscataway, NJ	ESPN3	W 48–0	40,061
September 10	12:30 pm	at North Carolina*	Kenan Memorial Stadium; Chapel Hill, NC	ACCN	L 22–24	53,000
September 24	2:00 pm	Ohio*	High Point Solutions Stadium; Piscataway, NJ	ESPN3	W 38–26	41,388
October 1	12:00 pm	at Syracuse	Carrier Dome; Syracuse, NY	BIG EAST Network	W 19–16 ^{2OT}	42,152
October 8	3:30 pm	Pittsburgh	High Point Solutions Stadium; Piscataway, NJ	ESPNU	W 34–10	46,079
October 15	2:00 pm	Navy*^{†}	High Point Solutions Stadium; Piscataway, NJ	ESPN3	W 21–20	47,138
October 21	8:00 pm	at Louisville	Papa John's Cardinal Stadium; Louisville, KY	ESPN2	L 14–16	48,435
October 29	3:30 pm	No. 24 West Virginia	High Point Solutions Stadium; Piscataway, NJ	ABC	L 31–41	47,303
November 5	7:00 pm	South Florida	High Point Solutions Stadium; Piscataway, NJ	ESPN3	W 20–17 ^{OT}	36,911
November 12	3:30 pm	vs. Army*	Yankee Stadium; Bronx, NY	CBSSN	W 27–12	30,028
November 19	12:00 pm	Cincinnati	High Point Solutions Stadium; Piscataway, NJ	ESPNU	W 20–3	47,447
November 26	12:00 pm	at Connecticut	Rentschler Field; East Hartford, CT	ESPN2	L 22–40	37,857
December 30	3:20 pm	vs. Iowa State*	Yankee Stadium; Bronx, NY (Pinstripe Bowl)	ESPN	W 27–13	38,328
*Non-conference game; ^{†}Homecoming; Rankings from Coaches' Poll released prior to the game; All times are in Eastern time

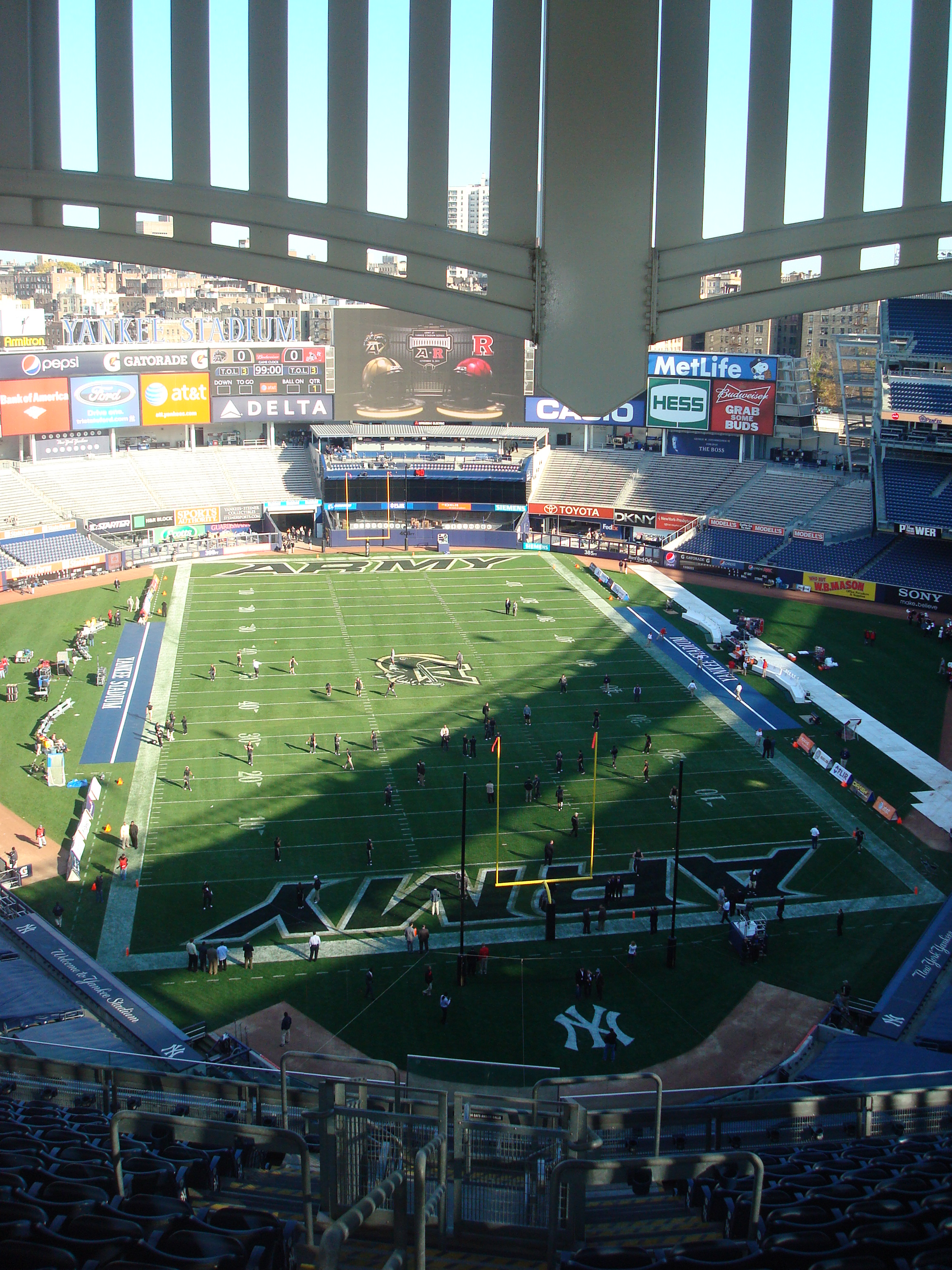
Yankee Stadium for a game between Army and Rutgers.
