= 2011 Clemson Tigers football team =

American college football season

2011 Clemson Tigers football

ACC champion ACC Atlantic Division champion

ACC Championship, W 38–10 vs. Virginia Tech

Orange Bowl, L 33–70 vs. West Virginia
- Conference: Atlantic Coast Conference
- Atlantic Division

Ranking
- Coaches: No. 22
- AP: No. 22
- Record: 10–4 (6–2 ACC)
- Head coach: Dabo Swinney (3rd full, 4th overall season)
- Offensive coordinator: Chad Morris (1st season)
- Offensive scheme: Spread
- Defensive coordinator: Kevin Steele (3rd season)
- Co-defensive coordinator: Charlie Harbison (4th season)
- Base defense: 4–3
- Home stadium: Memorial Stadium

2011 Atlantic Coast Conference football standings
	Conf.			Overall
Team	W		L	W		L
Atlantic Division
No. 22 Clemson x$	6	–	2	10	–	4
Wake Forest	5	–	3	6	–	7
No. 23 Florida State	5	–	3	9	–	4
NC State	4	–	4	8	–	5
Boston College	3	–	5	4	–	8
Maryland	1	–	7	2	–	10
Coastal Division
No. 21 Virginia Tech x%	7	–	1	11	–	3
Virginia	5	–	3	8	–	5
Georgia Tech	5	–	3	8	–	5
Miami (FL)	3	–	5	6	–	6
North Carolina	3	–	5	7	–	6
Duke	1	–	7	3	–	9
Championship: Clemson 38, Virginia Tech 10
$ – BCS representative as conference champion; % – BCS at-large representative; x – Division champion/co-champions; Rankings from AP Poll

The 2011 Clemson Tigers football team represented Clemson University in the 2011 NCAA Division I FBS football season. The Tigers were led by head coach Dabo Swinney in his third full year and fourth overall since taking over midway through 2008 season. They played their home games at Memorial Stadium, known as "Death Valley". They were members of the Atlantic Division of the Atlantic Coast Conference.

Clemson finished the previous season 6–7, losing in the Meineke Car Care Bowl to South Florida. They began the 2011 season unranked, but after a three-game winning streak against ranked opponents in late September, rose to #8 in the AP and Coaches Poll. However, the surprise Tigers lost three of their final four regular-season contests (with two of the losses to unranked opponents); they fell back to #21 in these polls. However, their early start was enough to clinch a spot in the 2011 ACC Championship Game. They won that game with an unexpectedly dominant performance over Virginia Tech, 38–10. In the process, they won their first ACC title since 1991, and with it an automatic berth in the 2012 Orange Bowl. It was the Tigers' first-ever Bowl Championship Series berth, as well as their first major-bowl appearance since the 1982 Orange Bowl. They lost the game in historic fashion to West Virginia by a score of 70–33, setting a bowl record for points conceded in a game.

== Schedule ==
Date	Time	Opponent	Rank	Site	TV	Result	Attendance
September 3	3:30 p.m.	Troy*		Memorial Stadium; Clemson, SC	ESPN3	W 43–19	73,458
September 10	3:30 p.m.	No. 7 (FCS) Wofford*		Memorial Stadium; Clemson, SC	ESPN3	W 35–27	74,538
September 17	12:00 p.m.	No. 21 Auburn*		Memorial Stadium; Clemson, SC (rivalry)	ABC	W 38–24	81,514
September 24	3:30 p.m.	No. 11 Florida State	No. 21	Memorial Stadium; Clemson, SC (rivalry)	ESPN	W 35–30	80,994
October 1	6:00 p.m.	at No. 11 Virginia Tech	No. 13	Lane Stadium; Blacksburg, VA	ESPN2	W 23–3	66,233
October 8	3:00 p.m.	Boston College^{†}	No. 8	Memorial Stadium; Clemson, SC (O'Rourke–McFadden Trophy)	ACCRSN	W 36–14	76,315
October 15	7:00 p.m.	at Maryland	No. 8	Byrd Stadium; College Park, MD	ESPNU	W 56–45	47,961
October 22	12:00 p.m.	North Carolina	No. 8	Memorial Stadium; Clemson, SC	ESPN	W 59–38	80,519
October 29	8:00 p.m.	at Georgia Tech	No. 6	Bobby Dodd Stadium; Atlanta, GA (rivalry)	ABC	L 17–31	55,646
November 12	12:00 p.m.	Wake Forest	No. 9	Memorial Stadium; Clemson, SC	ESPNU	W 31–28	78,375
November 19	3:30 p.m.	at NC State	No. 7	Carter–Finley Stadium; Raleigh, NC (Textile Bowl)	ABC/ESPN	L 13–37	57,583
November 26	7:45 p.m.	at No. 14 South Carolina*	No. 18	Williams–Brice Stadium; Columbia, SC (rivalry)	ESPN	L 13–34	83,422
December 3	8:00 p.m.	vs. No. 5 Virginia Tech	No. 21	Bank of America Stadium; Charlotte, NC (ACC Championship Game)	ESPN	W 38–10	73,675
January 4, 2012	8:30 p.m.	vs. No. 23 West Virginia*	No. 14	Sun Life Stadium; Miami Gardens, FL (Orange Bowl)	ESPN	L 33–70	67,563
*Non-conference game; ^{†}Homecoming; Rankings from AP Poll released prior to the game; All times are in Eastern time

== Depth chart ==
Defense

FS
Rashard Hall
Carlton Lewis

WLB	ILB	ILB	SLB
Quandon Christian	⋅	⋅	⋅
Daniel Andrews	⋅	⋅	⋅

SS
Jonathan Meeks
Robert Smith (safety)

CB
Coty Sensabaugh
Bashaud Breeland

DE	NT	DE
Andre Branch	⋅	Malliciah Goodman
Corey Crawford	⋅	Kourtnei Brown

CB
Xavier Brewer
Darius Robinson

Offense

WR
DeAndre Hopkins
Martavis Bryant

WR
Jaron Brown
Charone Peake

LT	LG	C	RG	RT
Phillip Price	Brandon Thomas	Dalton Freeman	Antoine McClain	Landon Walker
Brandon Thomas	David Smith	Mason Cloy	Mason Cloy	Gifford Timothy

TE
Dwayne Allen
Brandon Ford

WR
Sammy Watkins
Adam Humphries

QB
Tajh Boyd
Cole Stoudt

Key reserves
D.J. Howard

Special teams
PK Chandler Catanzaro
P Dawson Zimmerman
KR Sammy Watkins
PR DeAndre Hopkins
LS Michael Sobeski
H Dawson Zimmerman

RB
Andre Ellington
Mike Bellamy

=== Recruiting class ===
College recruiting information (2011)
Name	Hometown	School	Height	Weight	Commit date
Sammy Watkins; WR	Fort Myers, Florida	South Fort Myers	6 ft 1 in (1.85 m)	180 lb (82 kg)	-
Sammy Watkins; WR	Recruit ratings: Scout: Rivals: 247Sports: ESPN:				
Charone Peake; WR	Roebuck, South Carolina	Dorman H.S.	6 ft 4 in (1.93 m)	205 lb (93 kg)	—
Charone Peake; WR	Recruit ratings: Scout: Rivals: 247Sports: ESPN:				
Tony Steward; LB	Saint Augustine, Florida	Pedro Menendez H.S.	6 ft 2 in (1.88 m)	220 lb (100 kg)	—
Tony Steward; LB	Recruit ratings: Scout: Rivals: 247Sports: ESPN:				
Stephone Anthony; LB	Wadesboro, North Carolina	Anson H.S.	6 ft 3 in (1.91 m)	220 lb (100 kg)	
Stephone Anthony; LB	Recruit ratings: Scout: Rivals: 247Sports: ESPN:				
Mike Bellamy (running back); RB	Punta Gorda, Florida	Charlotte	5 ft 10 in (1.78 m)	180 lb (82 kg)	—
Mike Bellamy (running back); RB	Recruit ratings: Scout: Rivals: 247Sports: ESPN:				
Corey Crawford; DE	Chatham, Virginia	Hargrave Military Academy	6 ft 5 in (1.96 m)	275 lb (125 kg)	—
Corey Crawford; DE	Recruit ratings: Scout: Rivals: 247Sports: ESPN:				
Lateek Townsend; LB	Bennettsville, South Carolina	Marlboro County	6 ft 2 in (1.88 m)	200 lb (91 kg)	-
Lateek Townsend; LB	Recruit ratings: Scout: Rivals: 247Sports: ESPN:				
Eric Mac Lain; TE	Fayetteville, North Carolina	Jack Britt	6 ft 4 in (1.93 m)	250 lb (110 kg)	—
Eric Mac Lain; TE	Recruit ratings: Scout: Rivals: 247Sports: ESPN:				
Cortez Davis; S	Daytona Beach, Florida	Mainland H.S.	6 ft 2 in (1.88 m)	200 lb (91 kg)	—
Cortez Davis; S	Recruit ratings: Scout: Rivals: 247Sports: ESPN:				
Joe Gore; DE	Lake Waccamaw, North Carolina	East Columbus H.S.	6 ft 6 in (1.98 m)	260 lb (120 kg)	—
Joe Gore; DE	Recruit ratings: Scout: Rivals: 247Sports: ESPN:				
Tony McNeal; QB	Chester, South Carolina	Chester H.S.	6 ft 1 in (1.85 m)	180 lb (82 kg)	—
Tony McNeal; QB	Recruit ratings: Scout: Rivals: 247Sports: ESPN:				
Shaq Anthony; OL	Piedmont, South Carolina	Wren H.S.	6 ft 4 in (1.93 m)	260 lb (120 kg)	—
Shaq Anthony; OL	Recruit ratings: Scout: Rivals: 247Sports: ESPN:				
DeShawn Williams; DT	Central, South Carolina	D.W. Daniel H.S.	6 ft 1 in (1.85 m)	300 lb (140 kg)	—
DeShawn Williams; DT	Recruit ratings: Scout: Rivals: 247Sports: ESPN:				
Ryan Norton; C	Mauldin, South Carolina	Mauldin H.S.	6 ft 4 in (1.93 m)	275 lb (125 kg)	—
Ryan Norton; C	Recruit ratings: Scout: Rivals: 247Sports: ESPN:				
Roderick Byers; DE	Rock Hill, South Carolina	Northwestern H.S.	6 ft 3 in (1.91 m)	262 lb (119 kg)	—
Roderick Byers; DE	Recruit ratings: Scout: Rivals: 247Sports: ESPN:				
Cole Stoudt; QB	Dublin, Ohio	Dublin Coffman	6 ft 4 in (1.93 m)	200 lb (91 kg)	—
Cole Stoudt; QB	Recruit ratings: Scout: Rivals: 247Sports: ESPN:				
B. J. Goodson; LB	Lamar, South Carolina	Lamar H.S.	6 ft 2 in (1.88 m)	225 lb (102 kg)	—
B. J. Goodson; LB	Recruit ratings: Scout: Rivals: 247Sports: ESPN:				
Grady Jarrett; DT	Conyers, Georgia	Rockdale County H.S.	6 ft 0 in (1.83 m)	282 lb (128 kg)	—
Grady Jarrett; DT	Recruit ratings: Scout: Rivals: 247Sports: ESPN:				
Robert Smith (safety); S	Dorchester, South Carolina	Woodland H.S.	5 ft 11 in (1.80 m)	200 lb (91 kg)	—
Robert Smith (safety); S	Recruit ratings: Scout: Rivals: 247Sports: ESPN:				
Ammon Lakip; K	Alpharetta, Georgia	Chattahoochee H.S.	5 ft 11 in (1.80 m)	180 lb (82 kg)	—
Ammon Lakip; K	Recruit ratings: Scout: Rivals: 247Sports: ESPN:				
Jerome Maybank; DT	Pawleys Island, South Carolina	Waccamaw H.S.	6 ft 4 in (1.93 m)	335 lb (152 kg)	—
Jerome Maybank; DT	Recruit ratings: Scout: Rivals: 247Sports: ESPN:				
Adam Humphries; WR	Roebuck, South Carolina	Dorman H.S.	5 ft 11 in (1.80 m)	175 lb (79 kg)	—
Adam Humphries; WR	Recruit ratings: Scout: Rivals: 247Sports: ESPN:				
Colton Walls; LB	Charlotte, North Carolina	Charlotte Latin School	6 ft 2 in (1.88 m)	230 lb (100 kg)	—
Colton Walls; LB	Recruit ratings: Scout: Rivals: 247Sports: ESPN:				
Stanton Seckinger; WR	Charleston, South Carolina	Porter-Gaud School	6 ft 4 in (1.93 m)	200 lb (91 kg)	—
Stanton Seckinger; WR	Recruit ratings: Scout: Rivals: 247Sports: ESPN:				
Overall recruit ranking: Scout: 11 Rivals: 8 247Sports: 10 ESPN: 8
‡ Refers to 40-yard dash; Note: In many cases, Scout, Rivals, 247Sports, On3, and ESPN may conflict in their listings of height, weight and 40 time.; In these cases, the average was taken. ESPN grades are on a 100-point scale.; Sources: "2011 Team Ranking". Rivals.com.

== Game summaries ==
=== Troy ===
Team	1	2	3	4	Total
Troy	6	10	0	3	19
• Clemson	13	0	13	17	43

- Date: September 3
- Location: Memorial Stadium, Clemson, SC
- Game start: 3:30
- TV announcers (ESPN3): Joe Davis, Warrick Dunn

Clemson opened the season against Troy from the Sun Belt Conference. The Tigers offense had a shaky first half adapting to offensive coordinator Chad Morris's faster new spread set. They were 0-for-8 on third down conversions and had only four first downs. Sophomore quarterback Tajh Boyd had several bad throws and near interceptions as the team were booed off the field at half time.

Down 16–13 with 6:56 left in the third quarter, Clemson finally converted their first third down, tight end Dwayne Allen with a 54-yard touchdown pass from Boyd to put the Tigers ahead. On the next drive, Boyd completed all of his passes including a seven-yard touchdown pass to Jaron Brown. The scoring run continued in the fourth quarter, ending in a 43–19 rout.

Boyd finished the game 20-for-30 for 364 yards and three touchdowns in his debut as Clemson's starting quarterback. Sammy Watkins had seven catches for 81 yards while Andre Ellington rushed 18 times for 89 yards. Freshmen accounted for 266 of Clemson's 468 yards.

=== Wofford ===
Team	1	2	3	4	Total
Wofford	14	7	6	0	27
• Clemson	13	8	7	7	35

- Date: September 10
- Location: Memorial Stadium, Clemson, SC
- Game start: 3:30
- TV announcers (ESPN3): Joe Davis, Warrick Dunn, Angela Mallen

In week two, Clemson faced Wofford. The inexperienced Tigers defense struggled to contain Wofford's triple-option offense throughout the game. The Terriers led 21–13 with 4:03 remaining in the second quarter, but Tajh Boyd led a six-play, 72-yard drive and a two-point conversion to tie the game before half time.

Wofford's last lead in the game came in the opening series of the second half with a field goal. Clemson scored a touchdown each in the third and fourth quarters before stopping Wofford on fourth-and-2 with 3:30 remaining in the game to hold on for a 35–27 victory.

Boyd was 18-for-29 for 261 yards and three touchdowns. Andre Ellington had 22 carries for 165 yards. His 74-yard touchdown run was the longest of his career.

=== Auburn ===
#21 Auburn at Clemson

Team	1	2	3	4	Total
Auburn	14	7	3	0	24
• Clemson	0	21	14	3	38

- Date: September 17
- Location: Memorial Stadium, Clemson, SC
- Game start: Noon EDT
- Game attendance: 81,514
- Game weather: Sunny
- TV announcers (ABC): Dave Pasch (Play-by-play), Urban Meyer (Color), Chris Spielman (Sideline), & Quint Kessenich (Sideline)

Scoring summary
1	10:36	AUB	Michael Dyer 52-yard run (Cody Parkey kick)	AUB 7–0
1	7:54	AUB	Emory Blake 36-yard pass from Barrett Trotter (Cody Parkey kick)	AUB 14–0
2	14:56	CLEM	DeAndre Hopkins 4-yard pass from Tajh Boyd (Chandler Catanzaro kick)	AUB 14–7
2	8:54	AUB	Michael Dyer 1-yard run (Cody Parkey kick)	AUB 21–7
2	5:06	CLEM	Dwayne Allen 6-yard pass from Tajh Boyd (Chandler Catanzaro kick)	AUB 21–14
2	1:11	CLEM	Andre Ellington 2-yard run (Chandler Catanzaro kick)	Tied 21–21
3	13:45	CLEM	Sammy Watkins 65-yard pass from Tajh Boyd (Chandler Catanzaro kick)	CLEM 28–21
3	5:00	AUB	Cody Parkey 38-yard field goal	CLEM 28–24
3	0:16	CLEM	Sammy Watkins 19-yard pass from Tajh Boyd (Chandler Catanzaro kick)	CLEM 35–24
4	11:48	CLEM	Chandler Catanzaro 38-yard field goal	CLEM 38–24

Clemson faced defending national champions #21 Auburn in week three. Auburn took a 14–0 lead in the first quarter before Tajh Boyd began finding his passing rhythm. Boyd completed 30 of 42 passes for 386 yards and four touchdowns. The game was tied 21–21 at half time, but Clemson's defense restricted Auburn to a field goal in the second half while Boyd threw two touchdown passes to earn a 38–24 win, ending a 17-game winning streak for Auburn.

Clemson's offense totaled 624 yards, its record against an SEC opponent. Fans swarmed the field at the end of the game. Coach Dabo Swinney remarked, "I couldn't think of a better place to end the streak than Death Valley, South Carolina, baby."

=== Florida State ===
Team	1	2	3	4	Total
Florida State	10	0	7	13	30
• Clemson	14	7	7	7	35

- Date: September 24
- Location: Memorial Stadium, Clemson, SC
- Game start: 3:30 p.m. EDT
- Game attendance: 80,994
- Game weather: Sunny
- TV announcers (ESPN/ESPN3D): Brad Nessler, Todd Blackledge, Holly Rowe/Dave Lamont, Tim Brown, Alyssa Roenigk

Scoring summary
1	10:23	FSU	Dustin Hopkins 32-yard field goal	FSU 3–0
1	7:47	CLEM	Sammy Watkins 24-yard pass from Tajh Boyd (Chandler Catanzaro kick)	CLEM 7–3
1	1:54	CLEM	Tajh Boyd 1-yard run (Chandler Catanzaro kick)	CLEM 14–3
1	0:14	FSU	Rodney Smith 57-yard pass from Clint Trickett (Dustin Hopkins kick)	CLEM 14–10
2	11:31	CLEM	Dwayne Allen 12-yard pass from Tajh Boyd (Chandler Catanzaro kick)	CLEM 21–10
3	13:40	FSU	Bjoern Werner 25-yard fumble return (Dustin Hopkins kick)	CLEM 21–17
3	3:03	CLEM	Andre Ellington 1-yard run (Chandler Catanzaro kick)	CLEM 28–17
4	14:55	FSU	Rashad Greene 30-yard pass from Clint Trickett (pass failed)	CLEM 28–23
4	13:06	CLEM	Sammy Watkins 62-yard pass from Tajh Boyd (Chandler Catanzaro kick)	CLEM 35–23
4	7:21	FSU	Kenny Shaw 9-yard pass from Clint Trickett (Dustin Hopkins kick)	CLEM 35–30

Following their victory over Auburn, Clemson entered week four ranked #21. They faced Atlantic Division champions Florida State in their fourth straight home game. FSU were without injured starting quarterback E. J. Manuel. Clemson opened up a 21–10 lead by halftime, and were in control for the rest of the game.

Tajh Boyd was 23-for-37 for 344 yards and three touchdowns and had a rushing touchdown. Freshman receiver Sammy Watkins had eight catches for 141 yards and two touchdowns while Andre Ellington rushed for 72 yards.

=== Virginia Tech ===
Team	1	2	3	4	Total
• Clemson	3	7	7	6	23
Virginia Tech	0	3	0	0	3

- Date: October 1
- Location: Lane Stadium, Blacksburg, VA
- Game start: 6:00 p.m. EDT
- TV announcers (ESPN2): Mark Jones, Ed Cunningham, Quint Kessenich

Scoring summary
1	2:12	CLEM	Chandler Catanzaro 31-yard field goal	CLEM 3–0
2	4:35	VT	Courtney Journell 24-yard field goal	Tied 3–3
2	1:49	CLEM	Andre Ellington 1-yard run (Chandler Catanzaro kick)	CLEM 10–3
3	10:42	CLEM	Dwayne Allen 32-yard pass from Tajh Boyd (Chandler Catanzaro kick)	CLEM 17–3
4	6:12	CLEM	Mike Bellamy 31-yard run (kick failed)	CLEM 23–3

For Clemson's first road game the Tigers traveled to Blacksburg for a matchup with the No. 11 Virginia Tech Hokies. The Tigers' defense turned in its best effort of the season in a 23–3 victory against the No. 11 Hokies. The Clemson defense led by Andre Branch held the Hokies to 258 yards and no touchdowns. Branch had three sacks and was involved in 11 tackles. Tajh Boyd threw one touchdown to Dwayne Allen and one interception while Andre Ellington and Mike Bellamy both recorded a rushing touchdown apiece. This win marked the first time any ACC team had ever beaten three top 25 AP opponents in a row. It was also the second time Virginia Tech had not scored a touchdown in Lane Stadium under Frank Beamer and was the first time since 1995.

=== Boston College ===
Team	1	2	3	4	Total
Boston College	0	7	7	0	14
• Clemson	17	6	6	7	36

- Date: October 8
- Location: Memorial Stadium, Clemson, SC
- TV announcers (ACCRSN): Rich Waltz (Play-by-play), Keith Jones (Color), & Jenn Hildreth (Sideline)

Clemson's fifth home game of the season was against Boston College. Clemson controlled the Eagles for the majority of the game. Boyd scored 2 touchdowns (1 passing, 1 rushing) before being replaced by Cole Stoudt after suffering a hip injury. Andre Ellington (rushing) and Jaron Brown (receiving) each scored a touchdown, Sammy Watkins recorded 152 receiving yards, while Chandler Catanzaro hit a career-high 5 field goals (38, 42, 28, 20, and 47 yards). This win marked Clemson's best start since 2000.

=== Maryland ===
#8 Clemson at Maryland

Team	1	2	3	4	Total
• Clemson	10	7	18	21	56
Maryland	14	14	10	7	45

- Date: October 15
- Location: Byrd Stadium, College Park, MD
- Game start: 7:00 p.m. EDT
- TV announcers (ESPNU): Clay Matvick, Brian Griese, Allison Williams

Scoring summary
1	8:25	CLEM	Chandler Catanzaro 18-yard field goal	CLEM 3–0
1	4:58	MD	Davin Meggett 9-yard run (Nick Ferrera kick)	MD 7–3
1	2:23	MD	Cameron Chism 46-yard interception return (Nick Ferrera kick)	MD 14–3
1	1:00	CLEM	Andre Ellington 9-yard run (Chandler Catanzaro kick)	MD 14–10
2	13:54	MD	Davin Meggett 7-yard pass from C.J. Brown (Nick Ferrera kick)	MD 21–10
2	8:38	MD	C.J. Brown 21-yard run (Nick Ferrera kick)	MD 28–10
2	5:28	CLEM	DeAndre Hopkins 6-yard pass from Tajh Boyd (Chandler Catanzaro kick)	MD 28–17
3	13:06	MD	Matt Furtsenburg 22-yard pass from C.J. Brown (Nick Ferrera kick)	MD 35–17
3	10:46	CLEM	Sammy Watkins 13-yard pass from Tajh Boyd (Chandler Catanzaro kick)	MD 35–24
3	7:27	MD	Nick Ferrera 27-yard field goal	MD 38–24
3	6:15	CLEM	Chandler Catanzaro 23-yard field goal	MD 38–27
3	3:25	CLEM	Sammy Watkins 15-yard pass from Tajh Boyd (Tajh Boyd to Dwayne Allen pass)	MD 38–35
4	11:26	CLEM	Jaron Brown 12-yard pass from Tajh Boyd (Chandler Catanzaro kick)	CLEM 42–38
4	7:35	MD	Matt Furtsenberg 32-yard pass from C.J. Brown (Nick Ferrera kick)	MD 45–42
4	7:24	CLEM	Sammy Watkins 89-yard kickoff return (Chandler Catanzaro kick)	CLEM 49–45
4	3:55	CLEM	Andre Ellington 44-yard run (Chandler Catanzaro kick)	CLEM 56–45

Tajh Boyd threw four touchdown passes, Andre Ellington rushed for a career-high 212 yards and two touchdowns for the Tigers, and freshman Sammy Watkins scored three TDs (two passing, one kick-off return) as No. 8 Clemson rallied from an 18-point deficit against Maryland to remain unbeaten with a 56–45 victory. The defense, however, yielded 468 yards and had no answer for sophomore quarterback C.J. Brown, who ran for 162 yards and a touchdown and threw three scoring passes in his first college start. The 18-point deficit was the second largest in Clemson University history. Sammy Watkins also broke the school record for most all-purpose yards in a game (345 yards) held previously by Clemson great C.J. Spiller (312 yards).

=== North Carolina ===
Team	1	2	3	4	Total
North Carolina	7	10	7	14	38
• Clemson	10	14	35	0	59

- Date: October 22
- Location: Memorial Stadium, Clemson, SC
- Game start: 12:00
- TV announcers (ESPN): Dave Pasch, Chris Spielman, Urban Meyer, Quint Kessenich

A 35-point third quarter explosion highlighted Clemson's home win over the Tar Heels, including a 5-touchdown performance by quarterback Tajh Boyd. Defensive end Kourtnei Brown scored two defensive touchdowns, once on an interception and another on a fumble return. Boyd threw for 367 yards and rushed for one touchdown. Wide receiver DeAndre Hopkins had 157 yards receiving and a touchdown. Clemson's defense held UNC running back Giovani Bernard to 44 yards rushing, ending his five-game streak of 100 yards or more.

=== Georgia Tech ===
Team	1	2	3	4	Total
Clemson	3	0	7	7	17
• Georgia Tech	7	17	7	0	31

- Date: October 29
- Location: Bobby Dodd Stadium, Atlanta, GA
- Game start: 8:00
- TV announcers (ABC): Mike Patrick (Play-by-play), Craig James (Color), & Jenn Brown (Sideline)

The Tigers suffered their first defeat of the season at the hands of the Yellow Jackets in Atlanta. Georgia Tech's triple option attack was seemingly unstoppable for the Clemson defense as Yellow Jacket quarterback Tevin Washington scampered for 176 yards on 27 carries and a touchdown. Clemson's high-powered offense never left the gates in the first half, although the Tigers made a play for a comeback in the second half with a 48-yard touchdown catch by Sammy Watkins. Following a Rashard Hall interception to the Georgia Tech 9, the Tigers looked to have a chance to rally back, but Tajh Boyd threw an interception in the end zone to Jemea Thomas on the next play. Clemson's four turnovers in the game would ultimately prove to be costly for the Tigers.

=== Wake Forest ===
Team	1	2	3	4	Total
Wake Forest	7	0	21	0	28
• Clemson	7	7	7	10	31

- Date: November 12
- Location: Memorial Stadium, Clemson, SC
- Game start: 12:00
- TV announcers (ESPNU): Rob Stone, Danny Kanell

Clemson clinched its second ACC Atlantic Division title in a nail-biter game against the Demon Deacons in Death Valley. The Tigers' 14–7 third quarter lead quickly deteriorated following a 50-yard Mike Campanaro punt return for Wake Forest. Demon Deacon running back Brandon Pendergrass added two more scores to put Wake Forest up 28–14. Clemson also lost Sammy Watkins for the second half following an injury on a third-quarter kick return. The Tigers, however, rallied back with two touchdown tosses from quarterback Tajh Boyd. Following a missed 47-yard field goal try by Demon Deacon kicker Jimmy Newman, the Tigers orchestrated a drive to set up a 43-yard game-winning kick by Chandler Catanzaro as time expired. With the win, Clemson secured its trip to Charlotte for the ACC Championship Game and finished undefeated at home for the first time since 1990.

=== North Carolina State ===
Team	1	2	3	4	Total
Clemson	3	0	3	7	13
• North Carolina State	0	27	10	0	37

- Date: November 19
- Location: Carter–Finley Stadium, Raleigh, NC
- Game start: 3:30
- TV announcers (ABC/ESPN): Mike Patrick, Craig James

NC State shocked a heavily favored Clemson team in Raleigh, including a dominant 27-point second quarter performance. Wolfpack quarterback Mike Glennon threw for 253 yards and three touchdowns while Clemson quarterback Tajh Boyd, despite throwing 238 yards, threw two interceptions, no touchdowns, and was replaced in the 4th quarter by Cole Stoudt. NC State's aggressive pass rush hindered Boyd and Clemson's big play ability throughout the game, and the Tigers' four turnovers to NC State's none proved costly. The Wolfpack stymied Clemson's running game with running back Andre Ellington the team leader at only 28 yards.

=== at No. 12 South Carolina (rivalry) ===
Game Twelve– No. 17 Clemson Tigers (9-2) at No. 12 South Carolina Gamecocks (9-2) – Game summary

Quarter	1	2	3	4	Total
No. 17 Clemson	0	10	0	3	13
No. 12 South Carolina	10	7	7	10	34

at Williams-Brice Stadium • Columbia, South Carolina

- Date: Saturday, November 26, 2011
- Game time: 7:45 p.m. EST
- Game weather: Temperature: • Wind: • Weather: Clear
- TV announcers (ESPN): Brad Nessler, Todd Blackledge, Holly Rowe

Game information

First quarter

- (10:23) SC – Jay Wooten 47-yard field goal (Drive: 10 plays, 48 yards, 4:37; South Carolina 3-0)
- (6:36) SC – Bruce Ellington 49-yard pass from Connor Shaw (Jay Wooten kick) (Drive: 7 plays, 75 yards, 2:52; South Carolina 10-0)

Second quarter

- (11:32) CLEM – Dwayne Allen 9-yard pass from Tajh Boyd (Chandler Catanzaro kick) (Drive: 12 plays, 61 yards, 4:47; South Carolina 10-7)
- (6:14) CLEM – Chandler Catanzaro 32-yard field goal (Drive: 5 plays, 11 yards, 1:01; Tied 10-10)
- (1:55) SC – Connor Shaw 15-yard run (Jay Wooten kick) (Drive: 9 plays, 60 yards, 4:19; South Carolina 17-10)

Third quarter

- (9:52) SC – Rory Anderson 2-yard pass from Connor Shaw (Jay Wooten kick) (Drive: 5 plays, 66 yards, 2:18; South Carolina 24-10)

Fourth quarter

- (13:48) CLEM – Chandler Catanzaro 40-yard field goal (Drive: 8 plays, 13 yards, 2:39; South Carolina 24-13)
- (6:26) SC – Jay Wooten 37-yard field goal (Drive: 14 plays, 50 yards, 7:22; South Carolina 27-13)
- (5:20) SC – Alshon Jeffery 18-yard pass from Connor Shaw (Jay Wooten kick) (Drive: 2 plays, 19 yards, 0:41; South Carolina 34-13)

Statistics	CLEM	SC
First downs	12	19
Total yards	60–153	73–420
Rushing yards	30–70	53–210
Passing yards	117	226
Passing: Comp–Att–Int	11–30–1	14–20–0
Time of possession	14:03	22:37

Team	Category	Player	Statistics
Clemson	Passing	Tahj Boyd	11/29, 83 yards, TD, INT
Clemson	Rushing	Andre Ellington	13 carries, 66 yards
Clemson	Receiving	Sammy Watkins	4 receptions, 39 yards
South Carolina	Passing	Connor Shaw	14/20, 210 yards, 3 TD
South Carolina	Rushing	Connor Shaw	19 carries, 107 yards, TD
South Carolina	Receiving	Bruce Ellington	3 receptions, 71 yards, TD

=== ACC Championship ===
Team	1	2	3	4	Total
Virginia Tech	7	3	0	0	10
• Clemson	7	3	21	7	38

- Date: December 3
- Location: Bank of America Stadium, Charlotte, NC
- Game start: 8:00
- TV announcers (ESPN): Brent Musburger, Kirk Herbstreit, Heather Cox

Although devastating losses to NC State and South Carolina had Clemson's future looking bleak for the rematch against Virginia Tech in the ACC Championship, the Tigers regained their form from earlier in the season to secure their first ACC Championship game win and their first ACC title in 20 years. Quarterback Tajh Boyd threw for 240 yards and three touchdowns, including a 53-yard strike to Sammy Watkins during the Tigers' 21-point third quarter rally. Clemson defense forced three touchdowns and kept the Hokies scoreless in the second half. The defense also held running back David Wilson, the ACC's player of the year, to only 32 yards rushing. Clemson running back Andre Ellington ran for 125 yards and one touchdown on 20 carries. With the win, Clemson solidified its first 10-win season since 1990, a spot in the Orange Bowl and its first BCS bowl bid in school history.

=== Orange Bowl ===
Team	1	2	3	4	Total
• West Virginia	14	35	14	7	70
Clemson	17	3	6	7	33

- Date: January 4
- Location: Sun Life Stadium, Miami Gardens, FL
- Game start: 8:30 p.m. EST
- Game attendance: 67,563
- TV announcers (ESPN/ESPN Radio): Mike Tirico, Ron Jaworski, Jon Gruden, Lisa Salters/Joe Tessitore, Rod Gilmore, Quint Kessenich

Scoring summary
1	9:33	CLEM	Andre Ellington 68-yard run (Chandler Catanzaro kick)	CLEM 7–0
1	6:54	WVU	Shawne Alston 4-yard run (Tyler Bitancourt kick)	Tied 7–7
1	4:38	CLEM	Sammy Watkins 27-yard pass from Tajh Boyd (Chandler Catanzaro kick)	CLEM 14–7
1	2:49	WVU	Tavon Austin 8-yard pass from Geno Smith (Tyler Bitancourt kick)	Tied 14–14
1	0:45	CLEM	Chandler Catanzaro 42-yard field goal	CLEM 17–14
2	13:25	WVU	Tavon Austin 27-yard pass from Geno Smith (Tyler Bitancourt kick)	WVU 21–17
2	10:28	WVU	Darwin Cook 99-yard fumble return (Tyler Bitancourt kick)	WVU 28–17
2	4:49	CLEM	Chandler Catanzaro 43-yard field goal	WVU 28–20
2	2:29	WVU	Geno Smith 7-yard run (Tyler Bitancourt kick)	WVU 35–20
2	1:13	WVU	Tavon Austin 3-yard pass from Geno Smith (Tyler Bitancourt kick)	WVU 42–20
2	0:04	WVU	Shawne Alston 1-yard run (Tyler Bitancourt kick)	WVU 49–20
3	12:35	WVU	Stedman Bailey 6-yard pass from Geno Smith (Tyler Bitancourt kick)	WVU 56–20
3	9:18	WVU	Tavon Austin 37-yard pass from Geno Smith (Tyler Bitancourt kick)	WVU 63–20
3	1:37	CLEM	DeAndre Hopkins 28-yard pass from Tajh Boyd (pass failed)	WVU 63–26
4	6:21	WVU	Willie Milhouse 7-yard pass from Geno Smith (Tyler Bitancourt kick)	WVU 70–26
4	1:01	CLEM	Roderick McDowell 4-yard run (Chandler Catanzaro kick)	WVU 70–33

Clemson's best season in 20 years came to a crashing halt with arguably the worst bowl loss in school history. What at first appeared to have the makings of a high-scoring shootout between the Tigers and West Virginia turned into a shellacking on par with a video game score in the second quarter. Following Andre Ellington's fumble at the goalline and the 99-yard touchdown return by Mountaineer safety Darwin Cook, the floodgates opened for the Tigers. West Virginia quarterback Geno Smith was electrifying, and Clemson's defense did not have an answer for him as he rattled off 407 yards passing and 6 touchdowns. Although Clemson coughed the ball up four times on offense, the real story lay in the defense's inability to stop Smith and the Mountaineer offense. The result was a record in points in a bowl game for West Virginia.

== Rankings ==
Ranking movements Legend: ██ Increase in ranking ██ Decrease in ranking — = Not ranked RV = Received votes
	Week															
Poll	Pre	1	2	3	4	5	6	7	8	9	10	11	12	13	14	Final
AP	—	RV	—	21	13	8	8	8	6	11	9	7	18	21	14	22
Coaches	RV	RV	RV	22	15	8	8	8	6	12	10	8	17	21	14	22
Harris	Not released						8	8	6	10	9	8	17	20	14	Not released
BCS	Not released							7	5	11	9	7	17	20	15	Not released

== 2012 NFL draft ==
Clemson had four players selected in the 2012 NFL draft.

Player	Team	Round	Pick #	Position
Andre Branch	Jacksonville Jaguars	2nd	38th	DE
Dwayne Allen	Indianapolis Colts	3rd	64th	TE
Brandon Thompson	Cincinnati Bengals	3rd	93rd	DT
Coty Sensabaugh	Tennessee Titans	4th	115th	CB
