= Robert Smith (safety) =

American football player (born 1992)

No. 27
- Position: Safety

Personal information
- Born: December 22, 1992 (age 33); St. George, South Carolina, U.S.
- Listed height: 5 ft 10 in (1.78 m)
- Listed weight: 210 lb (95 kg)

Career information
- High school: Woodland
- College: Clemson
- NFL draft: 2015: undrafted

Career history
- Indianapolis Colts (2015)*; Seattle Seahawks (2015)*
- * Offseason or practice squad member only

Robert Smith (born December 22, 1992) is an American former football safety. He played college football for the Clemson Tigers.

== Early life ==
Smith attended Woodland high school in Dorchester, South Carolina where he graduated in 2011.

== College career ==
Smith committed to Clemson on January 15, 2010 and enrolled in July 2011. Smith was enrolled at Clemson from 2011 to 2014 and played all four years for Dabo Swinney's Tigers, playing in 53 games over that span.

== Professional career ==
Pre-draft measurables
Height	Weight	Arm length	Hand span	Wingspan	40-yard dash	10-yard split	20-yard split	20-yard shuttle	Three-cone drill	Vertical jump	Broad jump	Bench press
5 ft 10 1/4 in (1.78 m)	204 lb (93 kg)	30 3/8 in (0.77 m)	9 in (0.23 m)	6 ft 3 1/4 in (1.91 m)	4.59 s	1.52 s	2.70 s	4.41 s	7.06 s	31.0 in (0.79 m)	10 ft 1 in (3.07 m)	21 reps
All values from Pro Day

=== Indianapolis Colts ===
On May 4, 2015, after going undrafted, Smith was signed by the Indianapolis Colts. On August 6, 2015 Smith was waived by the Colts to make room for Tevin Mitchel.

=== Seattle Seahawks ===
On August 7, 2015, the Seattle Seahawks signed Smith off of waivers. Two days later, on August 9, Smith was waived by the Seahawks due to a failed physical. On January 18, 2016 Smith signed a futures contract with the Seahawks.

== Personal life ==
On December 18, 2014 Smith graduated from Clemson with a degree in health science.
