= The Sporting News =

U.S.-based sports news website and former publication

- Editor-in-Chief: Benson Taylor
- Categories: Sports
- Frequency: Weekly (1886–2008); Fortnightly (2008–2011); Monthly (2011–2012)
- First issue: 1886
- Final issue: 2012 (print)
- Company: Sporting News Holdings Limited
- Country: United States
- Based in: Charlotte, North Carolina
- Website: www.sportingnews.com
- ISSN: 1041-2859
- OCLC: 18708903

The Sporting News is a website and former magazine publication owned by Sporting News Holdings, which is a U.S.-based sports media company formed in December 2020 by a private investor consortium. It was originally established in 1886 as a print magazine. It became the dominant American publication covering baseball, acquiring the nickname "The Bible of Baseball".

From 2002 to February 2022, it was known simply as Sporting News. In December 2012, The Sporting News ended print publication and shifted to a digital-only publication. It currently has editions in the United States, Canada, Australia, and Japan. It also gives out sport-specific awards and an Athlete of the Year award.

== History ==
=== Early history ===
The Sporting News (TSN) published its first edition on March 17, 1886, in St. Louis. Founded by Alfred H. Spink, a director of the St. Louis Browns baseball team, the weekly newspaper sold for five cents and focused primarily on baseball, horse racing, and professional wrestling. At the time, other prominent sporting weeklies such as Clipper and Sporting Life operated out of New York and Philadelphia. By World War I, however, TSN had emerged as the only national newspaper devoted to baseball.

In 1901, the American League began play as a rival to the National League, and TSN became an outspoken supporter of the new league and its founder, Ban Johnson. Both advocated reforms intended to improve the sport's integrity, including efforts to eliminate gambling, curb liquor sales at ballparks, and discourage assaults on umpires. In 1903, TSN editor Arthur Flanner helped draft the National Agreement, which established peace between the two leagues and laid the foundation for the modern World Series. The publication's cultural influence continued to grow in 1904, when New York photographer Charles Conlon began taking portraits of major league players as they passed through the city's three ballparks: the Polo Grounds, Yankee Stadium, and Ebbets Field. Many of his photographs were featured in TSN and later became enduring visual records of baseball's early history.

Leadership of the publication remained within the founding family when Alfred Spink's son, J. G. Taylor Spink, assumed control of the paper in 1914. Under his tenure, TSN further solidified its central role in baseball culture. In 1936, the publication introduced the first major league Sporting News Player of the Year Award, honoring New York Giants pitcher Carl Hubbell. The award became the oldest major individual honor in Major League Baseball and remains notable for being voted on by MLB players. Although long closely associated with baseball, the publication gradually broadened its coverage. In 1942, it began providing in-season football coverage, and in 1946 it launched an eight-page football-focused tabloid titled The Quarterback, later renamed All-Sports News as coverage expanded to include professional and college basketball and hockey.

Following J. G. Taylor Spink's death in 1962, leadership passed to his son, C. C. Johnson Spink. That same year, the Baseball Writers' Association of America established the J. G. Taylor Spink Award in his honor, naming Spink himself as the first recipient. The publication continued to modernize during this period, publishing its first full-color photograph in 1967—a cover image featuring Baltimore Orioles star Frank Robinson.

Ownership of the publication changed hands several times beginning in the late 20th century. The Spink family sold TSN to Times Mirror in 1977. In 1981, C. C. Johnson Spink sold the publication to the Tribune Company. In 1991, The Sporting News transitioned from a newspaper format into a glossy, full-color all-sports magazine. The brand expanded into digital media in 1996 by serving as a sports content provider for AOL, followed by the launch of sportingnews.com in 1997.

In 2000, Tribune sold the company to Vulcan Inc., led by Paul Allen. The following year, Vulcan acquired the One on One Sports radio network and rebranded it as Sporting News Radio. In 2002, the magazine dropped the definite article from its title and became simply Sporting News (SN), a change reflected on subsequent covers. Vulcan sold the publication to Advance Media in 2006, which placed it under the supervision of American City Business Journals. Beginning in 2007, the organization initiated a relocation from its longtime home in St. Louis to ACBJ's headquarters in Charlotte, North Carolina. The move was completed in 2008, the same year the publication transitioned to a bi-weekly schedule.

=== Transition to digital publication ===
In 2011, Sporting News announced a deal to take over editorial control of AOL's sports website FanHouse. In December 2012, after 126 years, Sporting News published its final issue as a print publication, and shifted to becoming a digital-only publication.

The following March, ACBJ contributed Sporting News into a joint venture with the U.S. assets of sports data company Perform Group, known as Perform Sporting News Limited and doing business as Sporting News Media. Perform owned 65% of Sporting News Media. Sporting News would join Perform Group's other domestic properties, such as its video syndication unit ePlayer and its soccer website Goal.com. The deal excluded the magazine's Sporting News Yearbooks unit and NASCAR Illustrated. Almost immediately after the venture was established, Sporting News laid off 13 staff writers. Perform Group acquired the remainder of Sporting News Media in 2015.

Under Perform's ownership, Sporting News shifted to a more tabloid-like editorial direction. The site introduced a new logo and website design in 2016. Following Perform's acquisition of ACBJ's remaining stake, it began to align itself more closely with the company's other units, including replacing Associated Press articles with Perform's own Omnisport wire service for articles and video content (which began to constitute a sizable portion of the site's overall content). Sporting News also began to introduce new localized versions in other markets, with a focus on countries where it had launched its sports streaming service DAZN. These sites are, in turn, used to promote the DAZN service. Perform Media president Juan Delgado explained that the company was trying to preserve the heritage of the Sporting News brand by still publishing original content, while also publishing content oriented towards social media to appeal to younger users.

=== Later history ===
In September 2018, Perform Group spun out its consumer properties, including Sporting News and DAZN, into a new company known as DAZN Group. The remaining sports data business became Perform Content, and was sold in 2019 to Vista Equity Partners and merged with STATS LLC.

In the summer of 2020, Lindenwood University of St. Charles, Missouri, acquired the archives collection of The Sporting News from ACBJ. The collection was described as consisting of "10,000+ books on baseball, football, hockey, basketball, NCAA, and other sports."

In December 2020, DAZN Group sold Sporting News to a private investment consortium, which became Sporting News Holdings.

== Athlete of the Year ==
=== Sportsman of the Year ===
From 1968 to 2007, the magazine selected one or more individuals as Sportsman of the Year. On four occasions, the award was shared by two recipients. Twice, in 1993 and 2000, the award went to a pair of sportsmen within the same organization. In 1999, the honor was given to a whole team. No winner was chosen in 1987.

On December 18, 2007, the magazine announced New England Patriots quarterback Tom Brady as 2007 Sportsman of the Year, making Brady the first to repeat as a recipient of individual honors. Mark McGwire of the St. Louis Cardinals was also honored twice, but shared his second award with Sammy Sosa of the Chicago Cubs.

In 2008, the award was replaced by two awards: "Pro Athlete of the Year" and "College Athlete of the Year". These in turn were replaced by a singular "Athlete of the Year" award starting in 2011.

- 1968 – Denny McLain, Detroit Tigers
- 1969 – Tom Seaver, New York Mets
- 1970 – John Wooden, UCLA basketball
- 1971 – Lee Trevino, golf
- 1972 – Charlie Finley, Oakland A's
- 1973 – O. J. Simpson, Buffalo Bills
- 1974 – Lou Brock, St. Louis Cardinals
- 1975 – Archie Griffin, Ohio State football
- 1976 – Larry O'Brien, National Basketball Association commissioner
- 1977 – Steve Cauthen, horse racing
- 1978 – Ron Guidry, New York Yankees
- 1979 – Willie Stargell, Pittsburgh Pirates
- 1980 – George Brett, Kansas City Royals
- 1981 – Wayne Gretzky, Edmonton Oilers
- 1982 – Whitey Herzog, St. Louis Cardinals
- 1983 – Bowie Kuhn, Major League Baseball commissioner
- 1984 – Peter Ueberroth, Olympics organizer
- 1985 – Pete Rose, Cincinnati Reds
- 1986 – Larry Bird, Boston Celtics
- 1987 – (none)
- 1988 – Jackie Joyner-Kersee, Olympics
- 1989 – Joe Montana, San Francisco 49ers
- 1990 – Nolan Ryan, Texas Rangers
- 1991 – Michael Jordan, Chicago Bulls
- 1992 – Mike Krzyzewski, Duke basketball
- 1993 – Cito Gaston and Pat Gillick, Toronto Blue Jays
- 1994 – Emmitt Smith, Dallas Cowboys
- 1995 – Cal Ripken, Baltimore Orioles
- 1996 – Joe Torre, New York Yankees
- 1997 – Mark McGwire, St. Louis Cardinals
- 1998 – Mark McGwire, St. Louis Cardinals, and Sammy Sosa, Chicago Cubs (see also 1998 Major League Baseball home run record chase)
- 1999 – New York Yankees
- 2000 – Marshall Faulk and Kurt Warner, St. Louis Rams
- 2001 – Curt Schilling, Arizona Diamondbacks
- 2002 – Tyrone Willingham, Notre Dame football
- 2003 – Dick Vermeil, Kansas City Chiefs, and Jack McKeon, Florida Marlins
- 2004 – Tom Brady, New England Patriots
- 2005 – Matt Leinart, USC football
- 2006 – LaDainian Tomlinson, San Diego Chargers
- 2007 – Tom Brady, New England Patriots

=== Pro Athlete of the Year ===
- 2008 – Eli Manning, New York Giants
- 2009 – Mariano Rivera, New York Yankees
- 2010 – Roy Halladay, Philadelphia Phillies

=== College Athlete of the Year ===
- 2008 – Stephen Curry, Davidson men's basketball
- 2009 – Colt McCoy, Texas football
- 2010 – Kyle Singler, Duke men's basketball

=== High School Athlete of the Year ===
- 2008 – Manti Te'o, Punahou School
- 2009 – Harrison Barnes, Ames High School
- 2010 – Mike Bellamy, Charlotte High School

=== Athlete of the Year ===
Beginning in 2011, the awards were merged back into a singular selection, Athlete of the Year.

- 2011 – Aaron Rodgers, Green Bay Packers
- 2012 – LeBron James, Miami Heat
- 2021 – Shohei Ohtani, Los Angeles Angels
- 2022 – Lionel Messi, Argentina/Paris Saint-Germain
- 2023 – Caitlin Clark, Iowa Hawkeyes and Angel Reese, LSU Tigers
- 2024 – Shohei Ohtani, Los Angeles Dodgers and Caitlin Clark, Indiana Fever

== Sport-specific awards ==
=== Major League Baseball ===
TSN sponsors its own annual Team, Player, Pitcher, Rookie, Reliever, Comeback Player, Manager, and Executive of the Year awards. Many fans once held the newspaper's baseball awards at equal or higher esteem than those of the Baseball Writers' Association of America. Prior to 2005, the SN Comeback Player Award was generally recognized as the principal award of its type, as MLB did not give such an award until that year.

- The Sporting News Most Valuable Player Award (discontinued in 1946)
- The Sporting News Player of the Year (all positions; in MLB)
- The Sporting News Pitcher of the Year (in each league)
- The Sporting News Rookie of the Year (from 1963 through 2003, there were two categories: Rookie Pitcher of the Year and Rookie Player of the Year)
- Sporting News Reliever of the Year (discontinued in 2011)
- The Sporting News Comeback Player of the Year
- The Sporting News Manager of the Year (in each league (1986–present); in MLB (1936–1985))
- The Sporting News Executive of the Year (in MLB)

==== Minor League Baseball ====
- The Sporting News Minor League Player of the Year Award (1936–2007)

=== Basketball ===
- Sporting News NBA Executive of the Year Award (1973–2008)
- The Sporting News Men's College Basketball Player of the Year
- The Sporting News Men's College Basketball Coach of the Year Award

=== NFL ===
- The Sporting News NFL Player of the Year (1954–1969 and since 1980)
  - The Sporting News AFC and NFC Players of the Year (1970–1979)
- The Sporting News NFL Rookie of the Year
- The Sporting News NFL Coach of the Year (since 1947)
- The Sporting News All-Pro Team (since 1980)
- The Sporting News All-Conference Team (from 1950s till 1979)

=== College football awards ===
- The Sporting News College Football Player of the Year (1942)
- The Sporting News All-America Team (1934)
- The Sporting News College Football Coach of the Year

Also, between 1975 and 2005, Sporting News conducted an annual poll and named a national champion for Division I-A (now Division I FBS). It is regarded as a "major selector" in NCAA official records books.

== Notable staff ==
- Thomas G. Osenton, president and chief operating officer of Sporting News Publishing Company and publisher of The Sporting News weekly
- Bob Ferguson, journalist and author of Who's Who In Canadian Sport
