= Tye Hill =

American football player (born 1982)

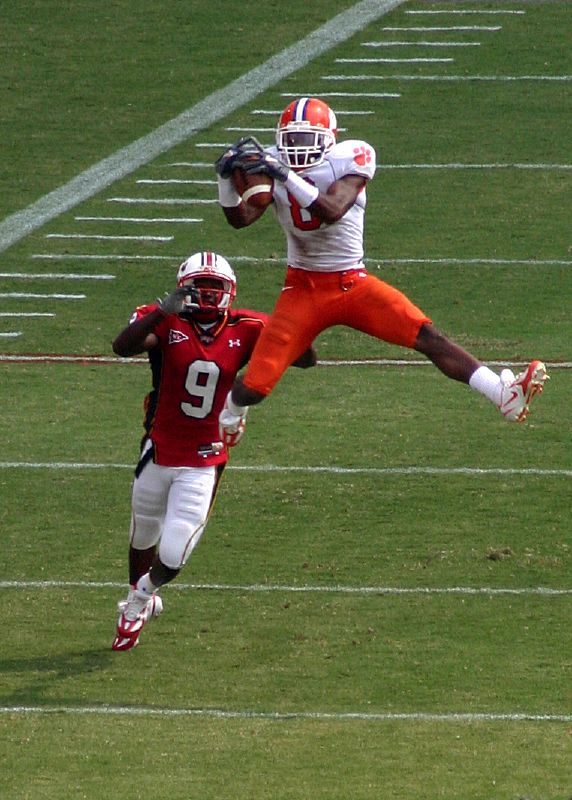
- Hill during his time at Clemson University

No. 26, 24
- Position: Cornerback

Personal information
- Born: June 3, 1982 (age 44); St. George, South Carolina, U.S.
- Listed height: 5 ft 10 in (1.78 m)
- Listed weight: 185 lb (84 kg)

Career information
- High school: Woodland (Dorchester, South Carolina)
- College: Clemson (2001–2005)
- NFL draft: 2006: 1st round, 15th overall pick

Career history
- St. Louis Rams (2006–2008); Atlanta Falcons (2009); Tennessee Titans (2010)*; Detroit Lions (2010)
- * Offseason or practice squad member only

Awards and highlights
- PFWA All-Rookie Team (2006); Consensus All-American (2005); First-team All-ACC (2005)

Career NFL statistics
- Total tackles: 115
- Forced fumbles: 1
- Fumble recoveries: 1
- Pass deflections: 17
- Interceptions: 5
- Defensive touchdowns: 1
- Stats at Pro Football Reference

John Tye Hill (born June 3, 1982) is an American former professional football player who was a cornerback in the National Football League (NFL) for five seasons. He played college football for the Clemson Tigers, earning consensus All-American honors. He was selected by the St. Louis Rams in the first round of the 2006 NFL draft. He was also a member of the Atlanta Falcons, Tennessee Titans, and Detroit Lions.

== Early life ==
Hill was born in St. George, South Carolina. He attended Woodland High School in Dorchester, South Carolina, and played high school football. During his senior year, he rushed for 1,445 yards in seven games.

== College career ==
Hill attended Clemson University, where he played for the Clemson Tigers football team from 2001 to 2005. He graduated with a bachelor's degree in human resource development. Hill was an All-American selection in 2005 and also a first-team All-Atlantic Coast Conference (ACC) choice. He was also a finalist for the Thorpe Award, given to nation's top defensive back. He had three interceptions, defended 7 passes and 54 total tackles. In 2004 Hill defensed 21 passes, two tackles for a loss and a sack to go along with his 52 tackles. In 2003, he started 11 of the 13 games and had seven pass breakups and two interceptions in his first season as a defensive back while also totaling 37 tackles. In 2002 Hill was a running back and was Clemson's third-leading rusher as a freshman with 225 yards on 42 carries and led all Tiger running backs in yards per carry (5.4). In 2001, he red-shirted as a running back.

=== Track and field ===
Hill was also an accomplished member of the track and field team at Clemson, winning three ACC championships and several all-conference accolades.

In 2004, he came in first in the 60 meter dash at the ACC Indoor Track and Field Championship with a time of 6.71 seconds.

He also posted personal bests of 10.27 seconds in the 100 meters and 20.97 seconds in the 200 meters.

==== Personal bests ====
Event	Time (seconds)	Venue	Date
60 meters	6.71	Champaign, Illinois	February 7, 2004
100 meters	10.27	Austin, Texas	June 10, 2004
200 meters	20.97	Gainesville, Florida	May 29, 2004

== Professional career ==
=== Pre-draft ===
Pre-draft measurables
Height	Weight	Arm length	Hand span	40-yard dash	10-yard split	20-yard split	20-yard shuttle	Three-cone drill	Vertical jump	Broad jump
5 ft 9 5/8 in (1.77 m)	185 lb (84 kg)	31 1/4 in (0.79 m)	8 3/8 in (0.21 m)	4.36 s	1.57 s	2.59 s	4.01 s	6.63 s	41 in (1.04 m)	10 ft 9 in (3.28 m)
All results from NFL Scouting Combine

=== St. Louis Rams ===
Hill was selected in the first round (15th overall) by the St. Louis Rams in the 2006 NFL draft. On July 31, 2006, Hill signed five-year $10.2 million contract with the Rams. In his rookie season he started in ten out of 16 games and finished the year with 50 tackles and three interceptions. Hill started his NFL career with a bang by recording two tackles and an interception, in the season opener against the Broncos. He capped the season by being named Rams Rookie of the Year and was voted to the 2006 All-Rookie honors from PFWA. For the 2007 season, he played in eight games and finished the season with 35 tackles and one interception. However, that interception was instrumental in the Rams 13–7 victory over the Divisional rival 49ers, in San Francisco on November 18, 2007. He finished the season on injured reserve. In 2008, in four starts, Hill totaled 20 tackles, 2 pass deflections, and a forced fumble. Hill tore cartilage in his knee which forced him to sit out the rest of the season after playing only four games. It was the second straight season he ended on injured reserve.

=== Atlanta Falcons ===
Hill was traded to the Atlanta Falcons on September 1, 2009, for a 7th round pick in the 2010 NFL draft. Hill scored the first touchdown of his career on November 8, 2009, when he intercepted a pass from Jason Campbell and returned it for a 62-yard touchdown.

Hill was released on March 16, 2010.

=== Tennessee Titans ===
Hill was signed to a one-year contract by the Tennessee Titans on March 30, 2010. He was waived by the team on September 4, 2010.

=== Detroit Lions ===
Hill was signed by the Detroit Lions on December 2, 2010. On March 4, 2011, the Detroit Lions elected not to tender Hill making him an unrestricted free agent.
