= Tai Lavatai =

American football player

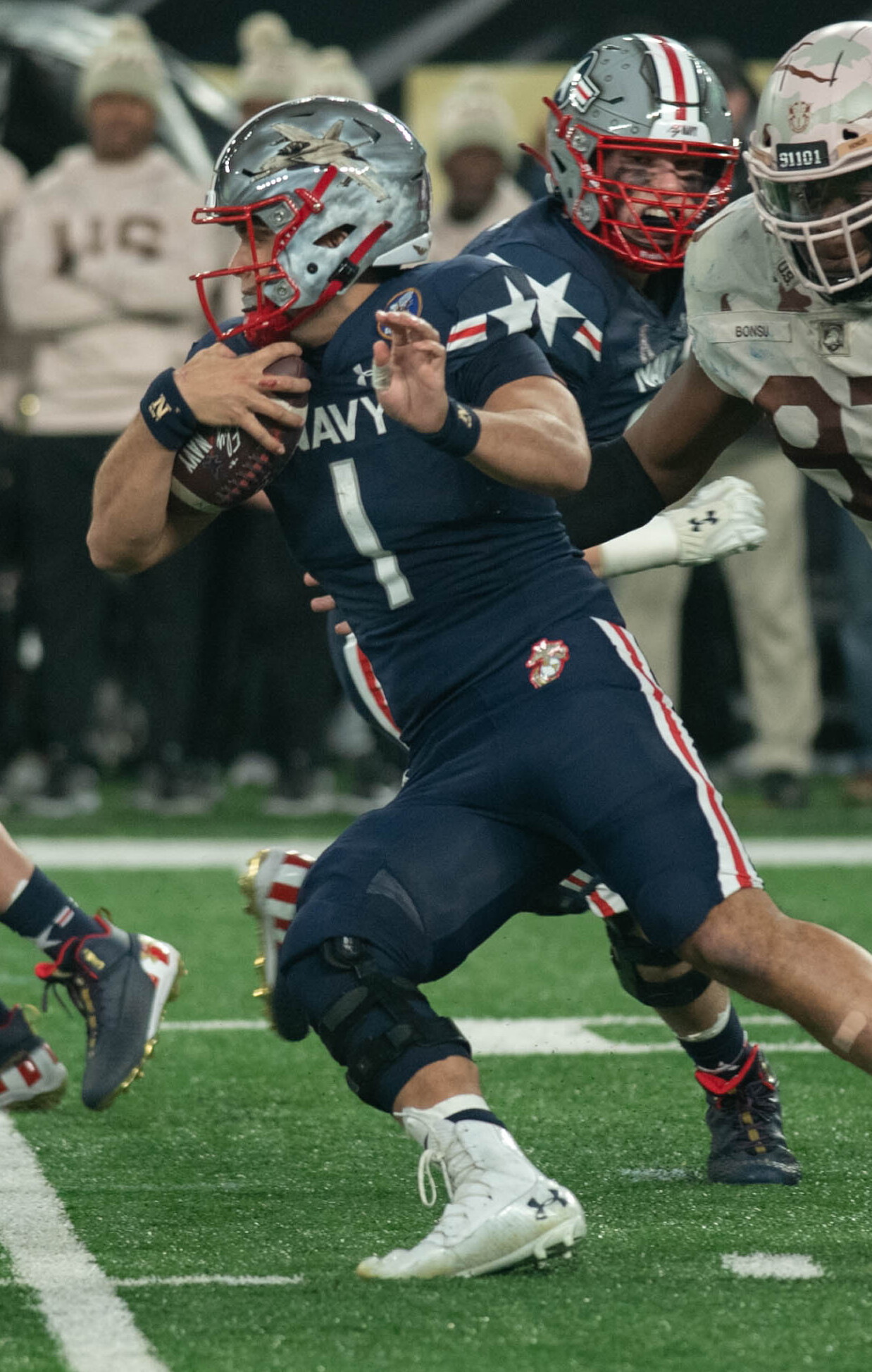
- Lavatai in the 2021 Army–Navy Game

No. 1
- Position: Quarterback

Personal information
- Listed height: 6 ft 2 in (1.88 m)
- Listed weight: 221 lb (100 kg)

Career information
- High school: Creekside (St. Johns, Florida)
- College: Navy (2020–2023)
- Stats at ESPN

Tai Lavatai is an American former college football player who was a quarterback for the Navy Midshipmen.

== Early life ==
Lavatai grew up in St. Johns, Florida, and attended Creekside High School where he lettered in football and baseball. In his high school career, Lavatai completed 124 of his 272 pass attempts for 1,772 yards, 20 touchdowns and six interceptions. Lavatai would also rush for 607 yards and 11 touchdowns, while also hauling in a reception for 36 yards. Lavatai would decide to commit to play college football at the United States Naval Academy.

== College career ==
During Lavatai's true freshman season in 2020, he did not see any action on varsity.

During the 2021 season, he started and played in all 10 games and finished the season with 371 rushing yards, seven touchdowns and 170 carries (both being a team high record). He also completed 34 out of 61 passing attempts for 449 yards, five touchdowns and two interceptions. During the team's yearly game against Army, Lavatai led the team to a win with 62 yards and two touchdowns on 20 carries while also completing four out of six passing attempts for 82 yards which are the second-most passing yards in his career.

During the 2022 season, he played in and started the first eight games before suffering a season ending injury while playing against Temple. Prior to the season, he was named to the Polynesian College Football Player of the Year Watch List. Lavatai finished the season with 309 rushing yards and five touchdowns on 115 carries while also completing 42 out of 91 passing attempts for 785 yards, five touchdowns, three interceptions along with a 26 yard touchdown pass which was the first of his career.

During the 2023 season, Lavatai was named the starting quarterback for the third consecutive year after suffering an injury during the previous season. After the Week 5 game against North Texas, he was named as a candidate for the Comeback Player of the Year Award. During the Week 6 game against Charlotte, Lavatai made only one offensive possession before suffering through a rib injury and not returning to the game.

=== Statistics ===
Year	Team	Games			Passing								Rushing			
Year	Team	GP	GS	Record	Comp	Att	Pct	Yards	Avg	TD	Int	Rate	Att	Yards	Avg	TD
2020	Navy	0	0	—	Did not play											
2021	Navy	10	10	4−6	34	61	55.7	449	7.4	5	2	138.1	170	371	2.2	7
2022	Navy	8	8	3−5	42	91	46.2	785	8.2	5	3	130.2	115	309	2.7	5
2023	Navy	7	5	2−3	40	75	53.3	522	6.8	4	2	124.1	56	171	3.1	2
Career		25	23	9−14	116	227	51.1	1,756	7.7	14	7	130.3	341	851	2.5	14

== Military service ==
Following his graduation from the Naval Academy in 2024, Lavatai entered the United States Navy as an officer in the Navy Supply Corps.
