= Xavier Hutchinson =

American football player (born 2000)

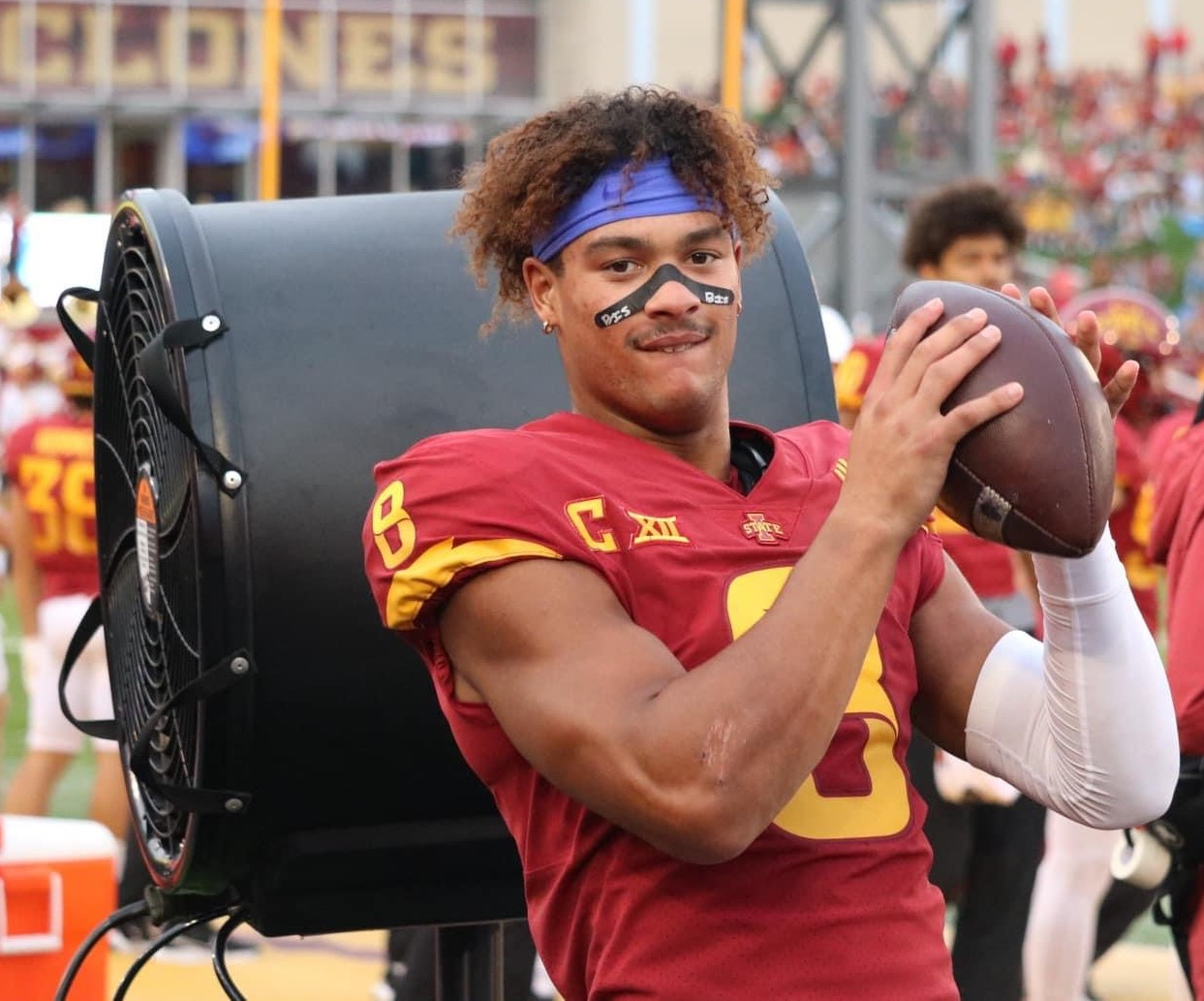
- Hutchinson with the Iowa State Cyclones in 2021

No. 19 – Houston Texans
- Position: Wide receiver
- Roster status: Active

Personal information
- Born: June 1, 2000 (age 26); Jacksonville, Florida, U.S.
- Listed height: 6 ft 3 in (1.91 m)
- Listed weight: 210 lb (95 kg)

Career information
- High school: Bartram Trail (St. Johns, Florida)
- College: Blinn (2018–2019); Iowa State (2020–2022)
- NFL draft: 2023: 6th round, 205th overall pick

Career history
- Houston Texans (2023–present)

Awards and highlights
- First-team All-American (2022); Big 12 Offensive Newcomer of the Year (2020); 3× First-team All-Big 12 (2020–2022)

Career NFL statistics as of 2025
- Receptions: 55
- Receiving yards: 635
- Receiving touchdowns: 3
- Stats at Pro Football Reference

Xavier Hutchinson (born June 1, 2000) is an American professional football wide receiver for the Houston Texans of the National Football League (NFL). He played college football at Blinn and Iowa State.

== Early life ==
Hutchinson attended and played football at Bartram Trail High School in St. Johns, Florida. As a senior, he had 74 receptions for 1,004 receiving yards and 11 touchdowns

== College career ==
Hutchinson attended Blinn College for two years before transferring to Iowa State University. In his two years at Blinn, he had 58 receptions for 961 yards and seven touchdowns. In his first year at Iowa State in 2020, Hutchinson started all 12 games and led the Big 12 Conference with 64 receptions for 771 yards with four touchdowns. In 2021, he started 12 of 13 games and had a school-record 83 receptions for 987 yards and five touchdowns. Hutchinson returned to Iowa State for the 2022 season, rather than enter the 2022 NFL draft.

=== Statistics ===
Year	Team	Games		Receiving				Rushing			
Year	Team	GP	GS	Rec	Yards	Avg	TD	Att	Yards	Avg	TD
2018	Blinn CC	11	—	15	306	20.4	2	0	0	0.0	0
2019	Blinn CC	8	—	47	652	13.9	5	0	0	0.0	0
2020	Iowa State	12	12	64	771	12.0	4	0	0	0.0	0
2021	Iowa State	13	12	83	987	11.9	5	2	18	9.0	0
2022	Iowa State	12	12	107	1,171	10.9	6	0	0	0.0	0
Total		35	34	254	2,929	11.5	15	2	18	9.0	0

== Professional career ==
Pre-draft measurables
Height	Weight	Arm length	Hand span	Wingspan	40-yard dash	10-yard split	20-yard split	20-yard shuttle	Three-cone drill	Vertical jump	Broad jump	Bench press
6 ft 1 7/8 in (1.88 m)	203 lb (92 kg)	31 3/8 in (0.80 m)	9 3/8 in (0.24 m)	6 ft 2 7/8 in (1.90 m)	4.53 s	1.55 s	2.62 s	4.35 s	6.91 s	36.0 in (0.91 m)	9 ft 8 in (2.95 m)	13 reps
All values from NFL Combine/Pro Day

Hutchinson was selected by the Houston Texans in the sixth round, 205th overall, of the 2023 NFL draft. As a rookie, he appeared in 16 games. He had eight receptions for 90 yards and played a role on special teams. In the 2024 season, he had 12 receptions for 117 yards in 16 games and three starts. In the 2025 season, he had 35 receptions for 428 yards and three touchdowns.
