= Bartram Trail High School =

- Bartram Trail High School crest

Location
- 7399 Longleaf Pine Parkway. St. Johns, Florida 32259; United States; 30°02′42″N 81°36′36″W

Information
- Type: Public
- Established: 2000
- Status: Open
- School district: St. Johns County School District
- Superintendent: Dr. Brennan Asplen
- School number: 411
- Principal: Dr. Ken Goodwin
- Teaching staff: 101.40 (FTE)
- Grades: 9–12
- Enrollment: 2,125 (2026–2027)
- Student to teacher ratio: 21.16
- Campus size: 120 acres (0.49 km^{2})
- Campus type: Rural
- Colours: Blue, silver, and black
- Nickname: Bears
- Website: https://www-bths.stjohns.k12.fl.us/

Bartram Trail High School (BTHS) is a public high school in the St. Johns County School District, located in northwest unincorporated St. Johns County, Florida (U.S.) that opened in 2000. More than a decade ago, the school was ranked number 327 by Newsweek magazine in the top 1,300 high schools in the United States.

The attendance boundary includes a portion of Fruit Cove.

== Academics ==
Bartram Trail's curriculum includes: art classes, English studies and literature, mathematics, performing arts, physical education classes, various science and social studies classes, vocational classes, world and foreign language classes, television production, band, chorus and turf management.

Bartram Trail offers the Air Force Reserve Officer Training Corps (AFJROTC) Academy which teaches various academic studies along with character and life skills education based around the heritage and traditions of the United States Air Force. The Bartram Trail High School Academy of Design and Building Construction is available to teach carpentry and in other fields such as interior design, drafting and fashion design. In 2007, Bartram Trail teamed with VyStar Credit Union to form the Bartram Trail High School VyStar Academy of Business and Finance. The course teaches career opportunities with financial services and business management industries. For students with disabilities, the Exceptional Student Education (ESE) program is available. One of the school's newest additions is the Information Technology Academy (IT). The IT academy provides students with foundational technological skills and knowledge that will prepare them for future careers in Information Technology.

The Advanced Scholars Program at Bartram Trail gives advanced students the opportunity to participate in advanced placement, dual enrollment and honors courses in preparation for college. For the 2019-2020 school year, Bartram Trail High School offered 28 Advanced Placement (AP) courses.

Bartram Trail can give the graduating seniors a choice of scholarships they can apply for, through the school, to get started with college. In 2006, seven Bartram Trail students earned scholarships when they became finalists in the National Merit Scholarship Program. The 2020-2021 school year graduation rate was 97%.

== History ==
Bartram Trail High School was founded in 2000 and was named after the William Bartram Scenic Highway and Bartram Trail exploration route in the Northern St. Johns County area, and not after William Bartram himself. Bartram Trail and Pedro Menendez High School were constructed to relieve overcrowding at Allen D. Nease Senior High School and St. Augustine High School. Bartram Trail and Pedro Menendez were the first new high schools built in the St. Johns County School District in twenty years, since Nease was opened in 1981. However, as the second school year at Bartram Trail began, the original capacity of 1,500 was exceeded with an enrollment of 1,529. By the 2002 school year, enrollment was at 1,840, more than 300 students above capacity. In 2004, the school district projected Bartram Trail's 2007-2008 enrollment at over 3,000.

To reduce overcrowding at Bartram Trail and Nease High School, two new high schools, Ponte Vedra High School and Creekside High School, were constructed and opened for the 2008–2009 school year.

From 2002 to 2006, the Florida Department of Education graded Bartram Trail as an "A" school, but in 2007, it was changed to a "B" school. Bartram Trail is also named in Newsweek's annual list of the top 1,300 high schools in the United States. In 2005, Bartram Trail ranked 894, in 2006 it was ranked 579, in 2007 it was ranked 474, and in 2008 it was ranked 327. US News ranks Bartram Trail #1,459 in the national rankings and #86 in Florida High Schools for 2021.

For the school year 2019-2020 the four-year adjusted cohort graduation rate was 98%

=== "Victory V" statue ===
Following the September 11, 2001 attacks, the Young Republicans Club at Bartram Trail wanted to get a piece of the destroyed World Trade Center for a memorial to those who died in the attacks. Students sent letters to the Office of Emergency Management in New York, forwarded by the former principal, Jim Springfield. The office replied in May 2002 and agreed to let them own a piece of the World Trade Center debris as long as Springfield came to New York City and got it himself. He received the debris on May 21, 2002; the piece was a six-foot-long piece of I-beam steel that weighed seven hundred pounds.

The concept behind the sculpture, created by art teacher Robert Kirk, was that the piece of World Trade Center debris was to be one-half of the letter "V" while the other half was to be made of pristine stainless steel. The "V" was to stand for "Victory", and was to symbolize the "somber tragedy and the unity of American resolve." The sculpture was unveiled in Bartram Trail's courtyard on September 11, 2002, one year after the attacks, with Florida Governor Jeb Bush attending the ceremony. Only seventy-three pieces of World Trade Center debris were donated, and it is believed that this was the only piece in Florida and the only piece in an American high school.

On September 11, 2014, Florida Governor Rick Scott gave a commemorative speech in front of the "V" to the student body.

=== Super Bowl XXXIX ===
For Super Bowl XXXIX, in 2005, Bartram Trail High School was selected by the National Football League as the practice facility for AFC champion New England Patriots. Bartram Trail was selected by the NFL because the World Golf Village was chosen as the New England Patriots lodging and the practice field had to be within twenty minutes of their hotel. Bartram Trail was also selected because the school's location was remote with little traffic and interference and because the walk from the lockers to the field was short enough. Bartram Trail was the first high school ever that was chosen to be the practice facility for a Super Bowl team.

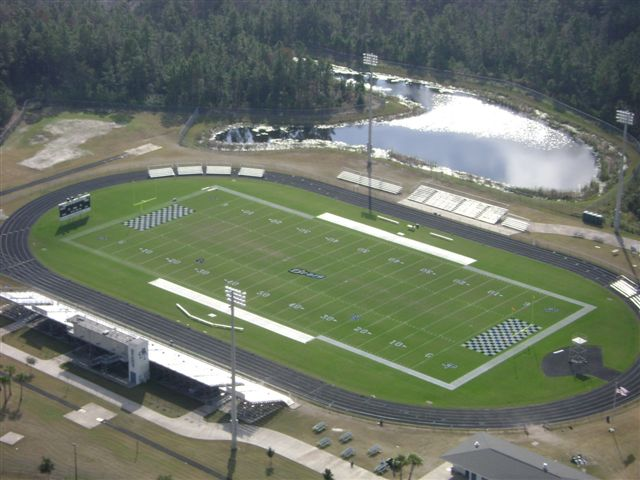
The Bartram Trail High School football field that was redone by the National Football League.

The NFL made modifications to Bartram Trail, installing new lockers, making a new practice field and modifying their game field to professional standards. The field modifications, however, were delayed by Hurricane Frances and caused them to start over several times. Bartram Trail's field was considered one of the top five high school fields in Florida, but the problem was that the field was supported by dirt, instead of sand. To fix this, the NFL modified Bartram Trail's football field by building the fields up with two hundred loads of sand, adding a drainage system and building the slope, crown and type of grass to the same specifications as Jacksonville Municipal Stadium. Students from the Bartram Trail turf management classes worked with George Toma, who had built all thirty-nine fields for the Super Bowl games, in building and maintaining the field.

After the two weeks of practice in Bartram Trail, a few of the New England Patriots and owner Robert Kraft came in on the last day to talk with the students and thank them for their hospitality, as New England head coach Bill Belichick had done earlier in a morning press conference.

=== Project Alaska Turf ===
In February 2007, Project Alaska Turf was started by Cathy Parker, a Bartram Trail High School parent and wife of a Bartram Trail football offensive coordinator. Project Alaska Turf was inspired by an Emmy Award winning ESPN documentary by Wayne Drehs on a community in Utqiagvik, Alaska. The documentary focused on a football program that was implemented in order to reverse high teenage suicide rates, accelerated drop out rates and increased teen drug abuse. Project Alaska Turf was funded by Bartram Trail, the Jacksonville Jaguars, ProGrass and the Grimes Companies. The project was aimed at raising money to provide a football team, the Barrow Whalers, an artificial turf field to replace their gravel-covered field. Since Utqiagvik (formerly known as Barrow), Alaska is above the Arctic Circle, grass doesn't grow there, resulting in their football field being made of dirt and gravel and causing injury to the players.

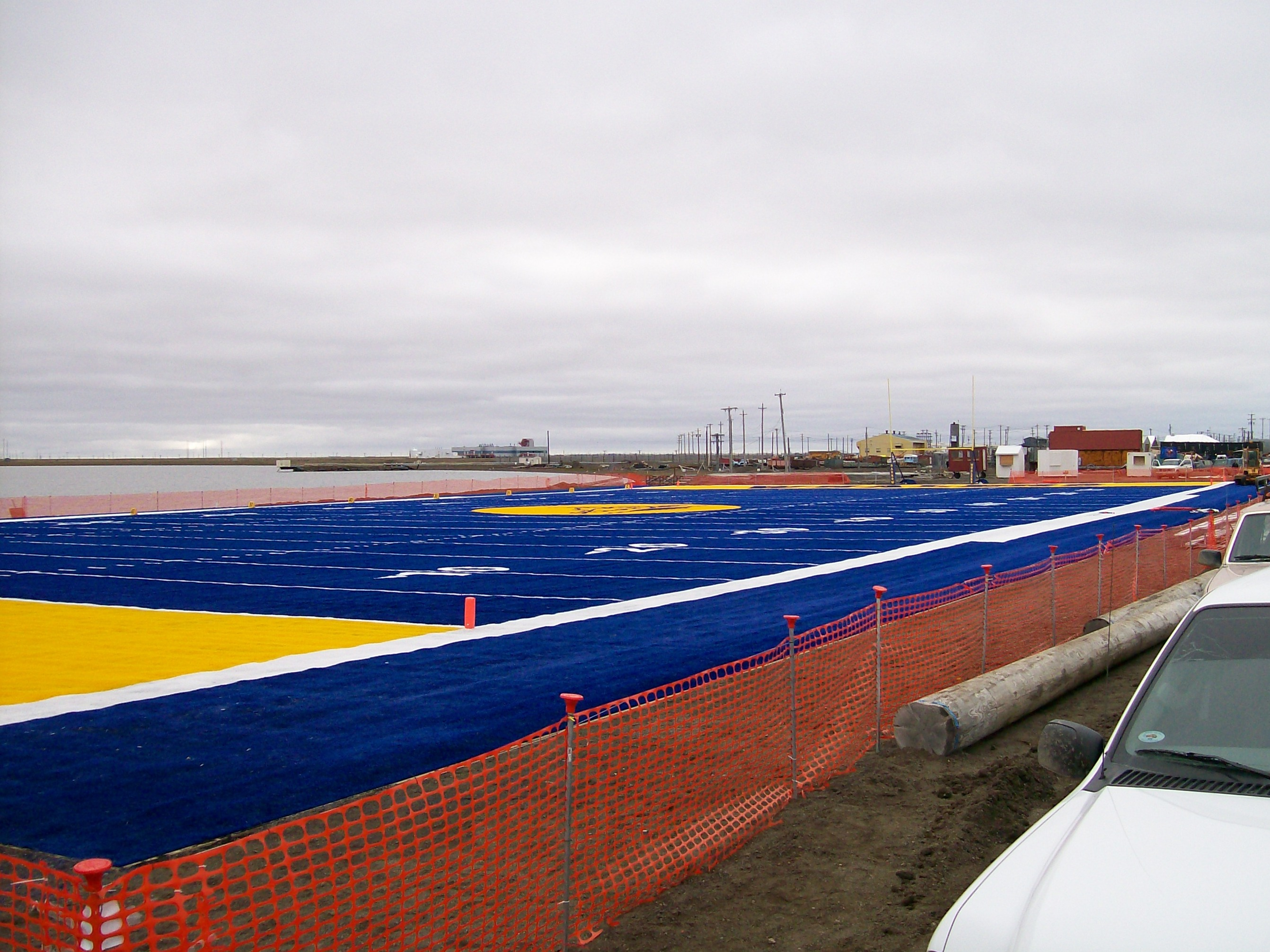
Side view of the Barrow Whalers' new turf field in Utqiagvik, Alaska.

The original goal was to raise $500,000 to make the field, but the ending target was eventually set to $800,000. The money covered the cost of buying, shipping and installing all one hundred and sixty tons of turf.

The Barrow Whalers were invited to Florida on May 17 through the May 19 but the Whalers didn't arrive until June. Restaurateurs and other business owners provided them free room and board upon their arrival. During their visit to Jacksonville, they scrimmaged against another local team and toured Jacksonville Municipal Stadium, where the Jacksonville Jaguars play.

The field was completed with $700,000 generated from the donation; $100,000 short of the goal. The Bartram Trail community worked for a long period of time and managed to move the field from Florida to Alaska by trucks, boats, trains, and on airplanes with help from ten different companies. The field was opened in time for the Barrow Whalers first game on August 17, 2007, which they won, 18–16, after being down by two touchdowns with three minutes left in the game. The game was the first live internet broadcast of a sporting event in the United States from north of the Arctic Circle and had NBC, ABC, ESPN, and most of Alaska's media there to cover the event.

=== Controversies ===
Over Bartram Trail's brief history, there have been multiple bomb threats and a threat of a school shooting. On October 16, 2001, at about 2:20 p.m., the school was under "code green" as a dark bag with the word "bomb" was found in the hallways on the second floor. Authorities evacuated the school and kept everyone at least five hundred feet away. Near 5 p.m., the bomb squad had removed the bag out of the school with a long rope and drove away with it. The bag only contained stuffed recycled paper and a two-liter bottle with more recycled paper sticking out of it. Seven students were arrested in connection to the incident. Four had their charges dismissed while one boy pleaded guilty to writing the note and was sentenced to probation and community service.

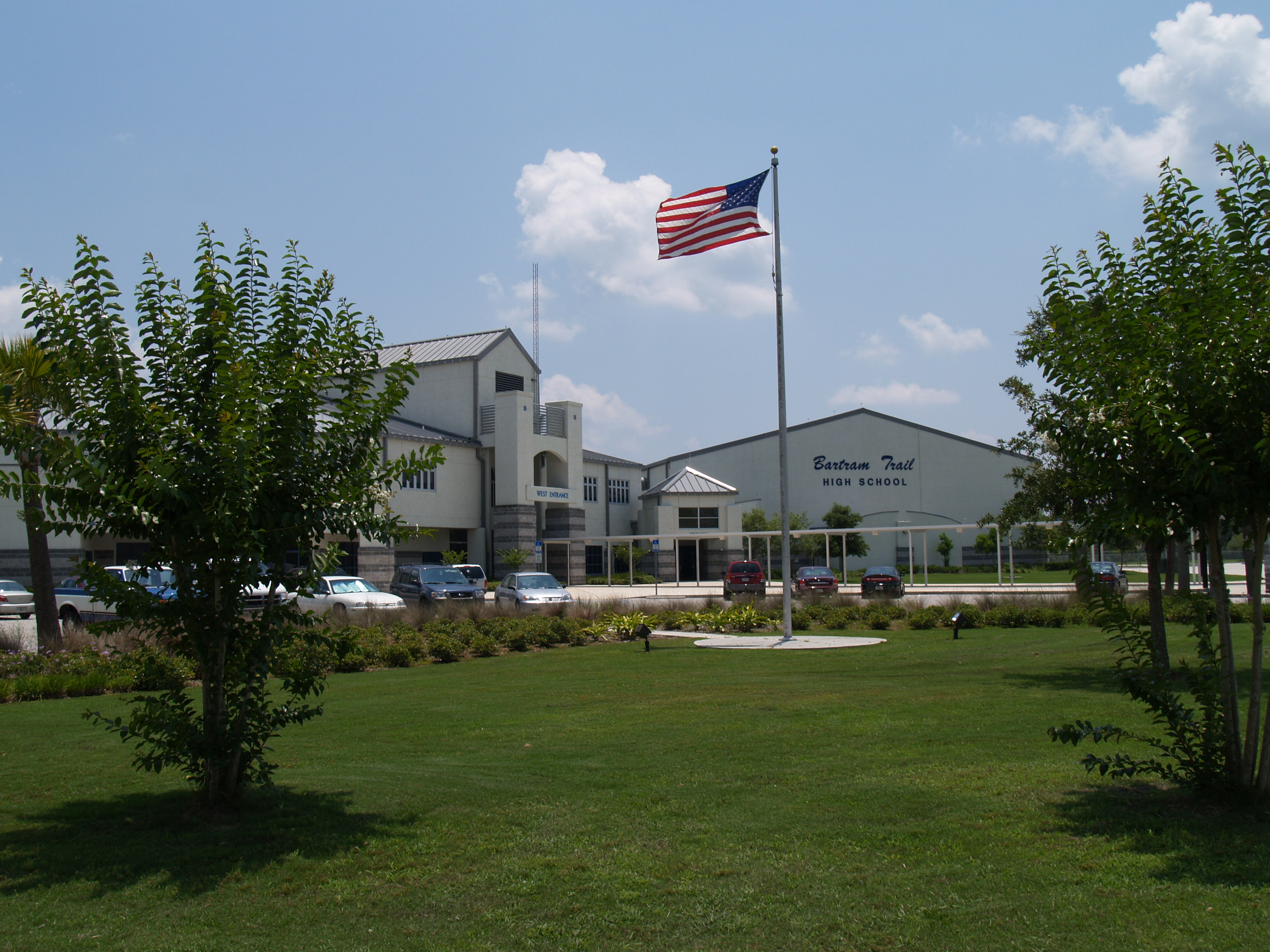
The west entrance into Bartram Trail High School.

On November 6, 2002, three female students of Bartram Trail were arrested and charged for "a false report of bombing or arson against state-owned property", a second-degree felony. The threat was written on the partition between bathroom stalls, reported as saying something akin to "This school will be blown to bits at noon". The threat was specific for noon on November 5, 2002.

During the time of the threat, the school was evacuated and searched by deputies and explosives detection dogs, but nothing was found. Two of the students were arrested at Bartram Trail on November 6, and the third was arrested at their home. The Youth Resource Deputy had received anonymous tips and learned that they talked about the threat, wrote about it on the bathroom wall and got rid of the marker they had used. The students were sentenced to twenty-one days at a youth detention center while evaluations took place and after they were released they had to remain under curfew and other restrictions until the case was finished. It concluded with the students having to "reimburse the county and the sheriff's office for the expense of the deployment."

On April 18, 2007, the St. Johns County Sheriff's Office arrested a fourteen-year-old student of Bartram Trail after he had posted an e-mail to a friend stating he wanted to conduct a mass school shooting. The e-mail stated that he planned to top the Virginia Tech massacre of thirty-three deaths by killing a hundred students. The threat wasn't directed at Bartram Trail or any other school specifically nor was he in possession of any weapons. The friend's parent saw the e-mail and reported it. Authorities checked around the school and didn't find anything suspicious. The student was charged with the "threat to throw, project, place or discharge any destructive device", a second degree felony. The same student had also made threats that were never reported.

=== Yearbook censorship ===
In May 2021, WJXT reported on the alteration of multiple yearbook photos by a local administrator, in accordance with dress code and modesty standards, by photoshopping the pictures of female students without their consent before publication. The school also had been found to have issued 78% of its most recent dress code violations to female students. In the opening monologue on his late night TV show, comedian Jimmy Kimmel jokingly said that "it's like they put the Taliban in charge of the yearbook committee" and "that's it's nice to know there are still heroes out there protecting our kids from all this sinful V-neckery". The incident made international news, with articles critical of the move appearing in the BBC, The New York Times, The Calgary Sun, and news sources in Europe and Australasia. Andrea K. McDaniels, deputy editor of The Baltimore Sun, wrote of the incident that: "Their photos were altered in the high school yearbook to cover up cleavage in a ridiculous display of body shaming. Girls were made to feel embarrassed and unproud of their natural bodies in a Handmaid's Tale kind of way."

== Campus ==
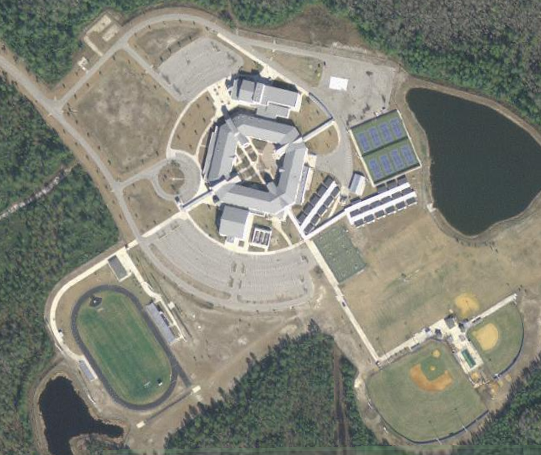
Satellite image of the Bartram Trail High School campus in 2004.

The land for Bartram Trail High School was purchased in January 1999. The school was constructed by Arcadis. The Bartram Trail High School campus takes up one hundred and twenty acres of land and the school building takes up 190,000 square feet (18,000 m^{2}). The school building is a two-story octagon with an open-air courtyard in the center. The cafeteria and media center are located within the main building, while the gymnasium and auditorium with a stage are attached on the south and north sides, respectively. The campus has walkways, student, faculty and visitor parking, a parent drop-off section, a bus loop, a football and track stadium, a baseball and softball field, tennis courts, general-use play fields, a stormwater treatment facility, water and sewer utilities and a wetland mitigation area.

=== Extensions ===
The Bartram Trail school building was originally designed to hold 1,500 students, but enrollment for the 2005–2006 school year exceeded 2,500. To provide classrooms needed immediately, portable buildings were set up on the east side of the campus. The number of portable buildings used by year is, as follows:

2002-03	2003-04	2004-05	2005-06	2006-07	2007–2008
10	25	42	55	56	36

For the 2007–2008 school year, a new permanent structure was built and opened at the northeast corner of the school to house the Ninth Grade Center. With the opening of Creekside High School for the 2008–2009 school year, enrollment fell below capacity. The portables were no longer needed and were removed at the end of the 2007–2008 school year.

== Athletics ==
The school's athletic director is Ben Windle. Athletics offered at Bartram Trail include:

- Varsity and junior varsity baseball
- Boys and girls basketball
- Varsity and junior varsity cheerleading
- Boys and girls cross country
- Dance
- Varsity and junior varsity football
- Boys and girls golf
- Boys and girls lacrosse
- Boys and girls varsity soccer
- Boys and girls junior varsity soccer
- Varsity and junior varsity softball
- Boys and girls swimming
- Boys and girls tennis
- Boys and girls track and field
- Winter guard
- Boys and girls Wrestling

- Boys and girls Volleyball
- Boys and girls weightlifting

Championships
Sport	Year	Championship
Baseball	2007-08	District champions
Baseball	2007-08	State playoffs sub-regional champions
Cheerleading	2007-08	Florida Athletic Coaches' Association State 5A title
Boys cross country	2006-07	District champions
Boys cross country	2006-07	Conference champions
Boys cross country	2006-07	3rd place in state championship
Girls cross country	2000-01	15th place at state championship
Girls cross country	2004-05	Conference champions
Girls cross country	2004-05	9th place at state championship
Girls cross country	2005-06	Conference champions
Girls cross country	2005-06	10th place at state championship
Girls cross country	2006-07	District, Conference & Regional champions
Girls cross country	2006-07	3rd place at state championship
Girls cross country	2007-08	District, Conference & Regional champions
Girls cross country	2007-08	State champions
Girls cross country	2008-09	District, Conference & Regional champions
Girls cross country	2008-09	State champions
Dance	2001-02	National Champions
Dance	2007-08	National Champions
Dance	2008-09	National Champions
Football	2005-06	5A District 2 champions
Football	2006-07	5A District 2 champions
Football	2007-08	5A District 2 champions
Football	2007-08	Regional champions
Swimming	2005-06	Conference champions
Swimming	2006-07	Conference champions
Swimming	2007-08	Conference champions
Boys track and field	2004-05	District champions
Boys track and field	2006-07	Conference champions
Boys track and field	2007-08	Conference champions
Girls track and field	2001-02	District champions
Girls track and field	2002-03	District champions
Girls track and field	2004-05	Conference champions
Girls track and field	2005-06	Conference champions
Girls track and field	2006-07	Conference, District champions
Girls track and field	2007-08	Conference, District champions
Girls track and field	2008-09	Conference champions
Volleyball	2007-08	District champions
Volleyball	2007-08	Episcopal tournament champions
Girls Softball	2007-08	District & Regional champions
Girls Softball	2007-08	5A State champions
Girls Softball	2008-09	Conference, District & Regional champions
Girls Softball	2008-09	5A State champions
Girls Softball	2009-10	Conference, District & Regional champions
Boys Golf	2008-09	District, Conference & Regional champions
Boys Golf	2008-09	State champions
Winter Guard	2006	FFCC 'A' - 2nd Place (silver medalist)
Winter Guard	2007	FFCC 'A' - 2nd Place (silver medalist) WGI 'A' Finalist 14th Place
2012	FFCC 'AAA' Champion - 1st (gold Medaliat)	
2013	FFCC 'AA' - 3rd (bronze medalist)	
2016	Varsity Guard WGI Semi-Finalist	JV Guard FFCC 'AAA' 3rd (bronze medal)
2018	Varsity Guard FFCC 'A' 2nd (silver medalist) WGI Semi-Finals	JV Guard FFCC 'AA' 3rd (bronze medalist)
2021-	FFCC 'A' - 3rd Place (bronze medalist) WGI 'A' Finalist	
2022-	Varsity Guard FFCC 'A' - 2nd Place (Silver medalist)	
2023-	Varsity Guard FFCC 'A' - Champions (Gold medalist) WGI Palm Beach Regional Champions WGI World Championship - Finals 10th place	
2024-	Varsity Guard FFCC 'A' - Champions (Gold Medalist) WGI World Championship- Finals 5th place	

== Administration ==
=== Principals ===
Bartram Trail High School has had five principals in its fifteen-year history. On July 1, 2015, Chris Phelps became the principal at BTHS. Phelps had been vice principal of the school since its opening in 2000. For the 2026-2027 school year, Dr. Ken Goodwin became principal of the school.

Principal	First year	Last year	Length of tenure by academic terms
James Springfield	2000–2001	2001–2002	2 years
Tim Forson	2002–2003	2005–2006	4 years
Brennan Asplen	2006–2007	2010–2011	5 years
Dawn Sapp	2011–2012	2014-2015	4 years
Chris Phelps	2015-2016	2025-2026	11 Years
Ken Goodwin	2026-2027	n/a	

== Demographics ==
Bartram Trail's enrollment trends show enrollment increases with each year.

2000-01	2001-02	2002-03	2003-04	2004-05	2005-06	2006-07	2007-08	2020-2021
1,246	1,529	1,840	2,124	2,281	2,486	2,615	2,627	3,086

The ethnicity of Bartram Trail's students is as follows (last updated for the 2006–2007 school year):

Ethnicity:	School Percentage:	District Percentage:	State Average:
White	87.8%	83%	47%
Hispanic	4.5%	9%	24%
Black	4.2%	4%	23%
Asian/Pacific Islander	1.8%	2%	2%
Multiracial/Other	1.7%	2%	3%

== Notable alumni ==
- Xavier Brewer – former Clemson Tigers football cornerback
- Xavier Hutchinson – NFL wide receiver for the Houston Texans
- Patrick Leonard – Chicago White Sox first baseman.
- Kyle Parker – Clemson Tigers football quarterback and baseball outfielder, drafted by the Colorado Rockies.
- Nathan Peterman – Tennessee Volunteers and Pittsburgh Panthers quarterback, drafted by the Buffalo Bills in the 2017 NFL draft, and also played for the Las Vegas Raiders, Chicago Bears and now the New Orleans Saints as a backup.
- Nicolas "Nic" Vansteenberghe – Love Island (American TV series) season 7 runner-up.

== See also ==
- List of high schools in St. Johns County
