= Joseph Lord =

Joseph Lord (30 June 1672 – 1748) was a Puritan pastor in colonial America in the late 17th century and early 18th century. He served as a pastor in Dorchester, Massachusetts, and then Dorchester, South Carolina, for two decades before becoming the pastor of the diocese of Chatham, Massachusetts.

== Biography ==
Joseph Lord was born June 30, 1672, the son of Thomas Lord and Alice (Rand) Lord of Charlestown, Massachusetts. He was educated at Harvard University, graduating in 1691. He was ordained as a minister at Dorchester, Massachusetts in 1695. In 1695, he led a group of his parishioners to the Ashley River in South Carolina to found the town of Dorchester, South Carolina, where he became pastor. On a return visit to New England, he married Abigail Hinckley, daughter of Governor Thomas Hinckley, who was three years his elder, on June 3, 1698.

After his return to South Carolina, Rev. Lord was disturbed that Baptists, especially under the leadership of Rev. William Screven, had been making converts of his flock. Rev. Lord and others challenged Screven to public debates. During this time, he wrote a sermon published under the title "Reason Why Not Anabaptist Plunging but Infant Believer's Baptism Ought To Be Approved" in which he affirms the doctrine of predestination.

After twenty years in South Carolina, he moved back to Chatham, Massachusetts on June 15, 1720. His wife died half a decade later, in 1725. When Rev. Lord returned from South Carolina, he was hired to assume the duties of pastor at a new church, the Church of Christ, in Chatham on June 15, 1720. When Mr. Adams first sought to form the church, there were seven male members and 20-30 female members. The male members in 1720, when Reverend Lord came to the church, were himself, Jonathan Collins, John Collins, Deacon Thomas Atkins, Deacon John Atkins, Moses Godfrey and Elisha Mayo. When he came to the church in 1720 with his large family, the church voted to build him a house which was completed in 1721. The history and records of this church have for the most part been lost. Samuel Taylor was given the title of Deacon in 1736, Paul Crowell as early as 1738 and Stephen Smith in 1749.

His second marriage was to Bethia Howes and took place in Harwich, November 16, 1743. Her first husband was Lieutenant Isaac Hawes, a descendant of John Howland, by whom she had seven or more children. Her second husband was Mr. John Smith of Eastham who had seven children by his first wife. Reverend Lord died June 6, 1748, in Chatham.

== Children ==
- Mercy Lord, born March 2, 1699. Mercy remained in Dorchester when her father returned north and married Shubael Taylor on September 13, 1729.
- Mary Lord, born April 19, 1701. She also stayed, marrying Moses Hatch in April 1724.
- Thomas Lord, born August 25, 1703, and died November 1704.
- Abigail and Joseph Lord, born September 27, 1704. These twins were named for each of their parents. Abigail married Joseph Paine, and Joseph married Sarah Rand on April 22, 1728. The couple had 11 children and he died December 7, 1788.
- Samuel Lord, born June 26, 1707. He died January 2, 1766, of smallpox, unmarried.
- Robert Lord, born February 28, 1712.
- Alice Lord, born March 26, 1714. She married Benjamin Kettell on May 17, 1737.
