= Woodland High School (South Carolina) =

Location
- 4128 Highway 78; Dorchester, SC, 29437; United States
- Coordinates: 33.1676°N 80.4926°W

Information
- Type: Public
- Established: 1999
- School district: Dorchester County School District 4
- Teaching staff: 48.00 (FTE)
- Grades: 9–12
- Enrollment: 669 (2023–2024)
- Student to teacher ratio: 13.94
- Colors: Hunter green, white and silver gray
- Mascot: Wolverine
- Website: woodland.dorchester4.k12.sc.us

Woodland High School is located in Dorchester, SC, it was established in 1999. Sixty-four percent of students passed the HSAP on the first try, compared to eighty-four percent in the neighboring district. It was the high school of football star Tye Hill.
