= Marcus Hardison =

American football player (born 1992)

No. 67, 91
- Position: Defensive tackle

Personal information
- Born: February 14, 1992 (age 34); Natchitoches, Louisiana, U.S.
- Listed height: 6 ft 3 in (1.91 m)
- Listed weight: 310 lb (141 kg)

Career information
- High school: Punta Gorda (FL) Charlotte
- College: Arizona State
- NFL draft: 2015: 4th round, 135th overall pick

Career history
- Cincinnati Bengals (2015–2016); Jacksonville Jaguars (2017)*; New England Patriots (2017)*; Houston Texans (2017–2018)*; Los Angeles Chargers (2018)*; Arizona Hotshots (2019); St. Louis BattleHawks (2020)*
- * Offseason or practice squad member only
- Stats at Pro Football Reference

Marcus Hardison (born February 14, 1992) is an American former professional football defensive tackle. He played college football at Arizona State and was selected by the Cincinnati Bengals in the fourth round of the 2015 NFL draft.

== Early life ==
Hardison attended Charlotte High School in Punta Gorda, Florida. He played quarterback early in his career before moving to defensive line.

== College career ==
Hardison attended Dodge City Community College in 2011 and 2012. During those two years, he had 96 tackles and seven sacks. In 2013, he transferred to Arizona State University. In his first year at Arizona State he appeared in 13 of 14 games, recording five tackles and a sack. As a senior in 2014, Hardison played in all 13 games, recording 53 tackles, a team-leading 10 sacks and one interception.

== Professional career ==
Pre-draft measurables
Height	Weight	Arm length	Hand span	Wingspan	40-yard dash	10-yard split	20-yard split	20-yard shuttle	Three-cone drill	Vertical jump	Broad jump	Bench press
6 ft 3 1/8 in (1.91 m)	307 lb (139 kg)	33 1/2 in (0.85 m)	10 3/8 in (0.26 m)	6 ft 11 1/8 in (2.11 m)	4.91 s	1.69 s	2.84 s	4.52 s	7.35 s	25.5 in (0.65 m)	8 ft 11 in (2.72 m)	27 reps
All values from NFL Combine/Pro Day

=== Cincinnati Bengals ===
Hardison was selected by the Cincinnati Bengals in the fourth round, 135th overall, in the 2015 NFL draft. He made the Bengals final roster, but was inactive for every game in 2015 including the playoffs.

Hardison suffered a shoulder injury in the third preseason game and was out for the 2016 season.

On September 2, 2017, Hardison was released by the Bengals.

=== Jacksonville Jaguars ===
On September 20, 2017, Hardison was signed to practice squad of the Jacksonville Jaguars. He was released on November 20, 2017.

=== New England Patriots ===
On December 2, 2017, Hardison was signed to the New England Patriots' practice squad. He was released on December 19, 2017.

=== Houston Texans ===
On December 21, 2017, Hardison was signed to the Houston Texans' practice squad. He signed a reserve/future contract with the Texans on January 1, 2018.

On August 27, 2018, Hardison was waived by the Texans.

=== Los Angeles Chargers ===
On August 28, 2018, Hardison was claimed off waivers by the Los Angeles Chargers. He was waived on September 1, 2018.

=== Arizona Hotshots ===
In late 2018, Hardison signed with the Arizona Hotshots of the Alliance of American Football. He was waived on March 25, 2019.

=== St. Louis BattleHawks ===
In October 2019, Hardison was selected by the St. Louis BattleHawks of the XFL in the 2020 XFL draft. He was waived during final roster cuts on January 22, 2020.
