= Xavier Brewer =

American football player and coach (born 1990)

Oklahoma Sooners
- Title: Assistant secondary coach

Personal information
- Born: January 25, 1990 (age 36); Jacksonville, Florida, U.S.
- Listed height: 5 ft 11 in (1.80 m)
- Listed weight: 190 lb (86 kg)

Career information
- High school: Bartram Trail (FL)
- College: Clemson
- NFL draft: 2013: undrafted

Career history

Playing
- Dallas Cowboys (2013)*; Jacksonville Sharks (2014–2015)
- * Offseason or practice squad member only

Coaching
- Clemson (2019–2020) Graduate assistant; Louisiana–Monroe (2021) Cornerbacks coach; Oklahoma (2022–2025) Senior defensive analyst; Oklahoma (2026–present) Assistant secondary coach

Career AFL statistics
- Total tackles: 94
- Interceptions: 3
- Receptions: 1
- Receiving yards: 7
- Return yards: 13
- Stats at ArenaFan.com

Xavier Brewer (born January 25, 1990) is an American football coach and former cornerback who is currently a defensive analyst at the University of Oklahoma. He was previously a graduate assistant at Clemson University, and cornerbacks coach at the University of Louisiana at Monroe. He also played college football at Clemson before going on to sign with the Dallas Cowboys of the National Football League (NFL) as an undrafted free agent in 2013. He also spent time with the Jacksonville Sharks of the Arena Football League (AFL).

== College career ==
Initially interested in schools like Florida, Miami (FL), and Georgia, Brewer committed to play college football at Clemson after being convinced to visit the campus by then-recruiting coordinator Dabo Swinney and liking it.

After redshirting his true freshman season, Brewer spent his redshirt freshman season as a reserve cornerback and special teams player. In his sophomore year, he was named the starting nickelback when the defense was in nickel defense. By the conclusion of his playing career, he was a team co-captain and compiled 193 tackles throughout his career.

== Professional career ==
After going undrafted in the 2013 NFL draft, Brewer signed with the Dallas Cowboys and played throughout the preseason before being released as the final part of roster cuts.

Brewer signed with the Jacksonville Sharks of the Arena Football League in 2014. He was placed on recallable assignment in 2015.

== Coaching career ==
At the conclusion of his playing career, Brewer went on to work as a personal trainer before going into coaching. He also spent time as the head coach at Landrum Middle School in the St. Johns County School District.

Brewer joined the coaching staff at his alma mater Clemson in 2019 as a graduate assistant. He was named the cornerbacks coach at Louisiana–Monroe in 2021.

== Personal life ==
Brewer's father Chris was a member of the Denver Broncos and was part of the Denver Dynamite ArenaBowl I championship team. His brother C. J. was also a member of the San Francisco 49ers practice squad. He is a father of two; In 2023, he welcomed a baby boy into the world, and in 2025, a baby girl.
