= Creekside High School (Florida) =

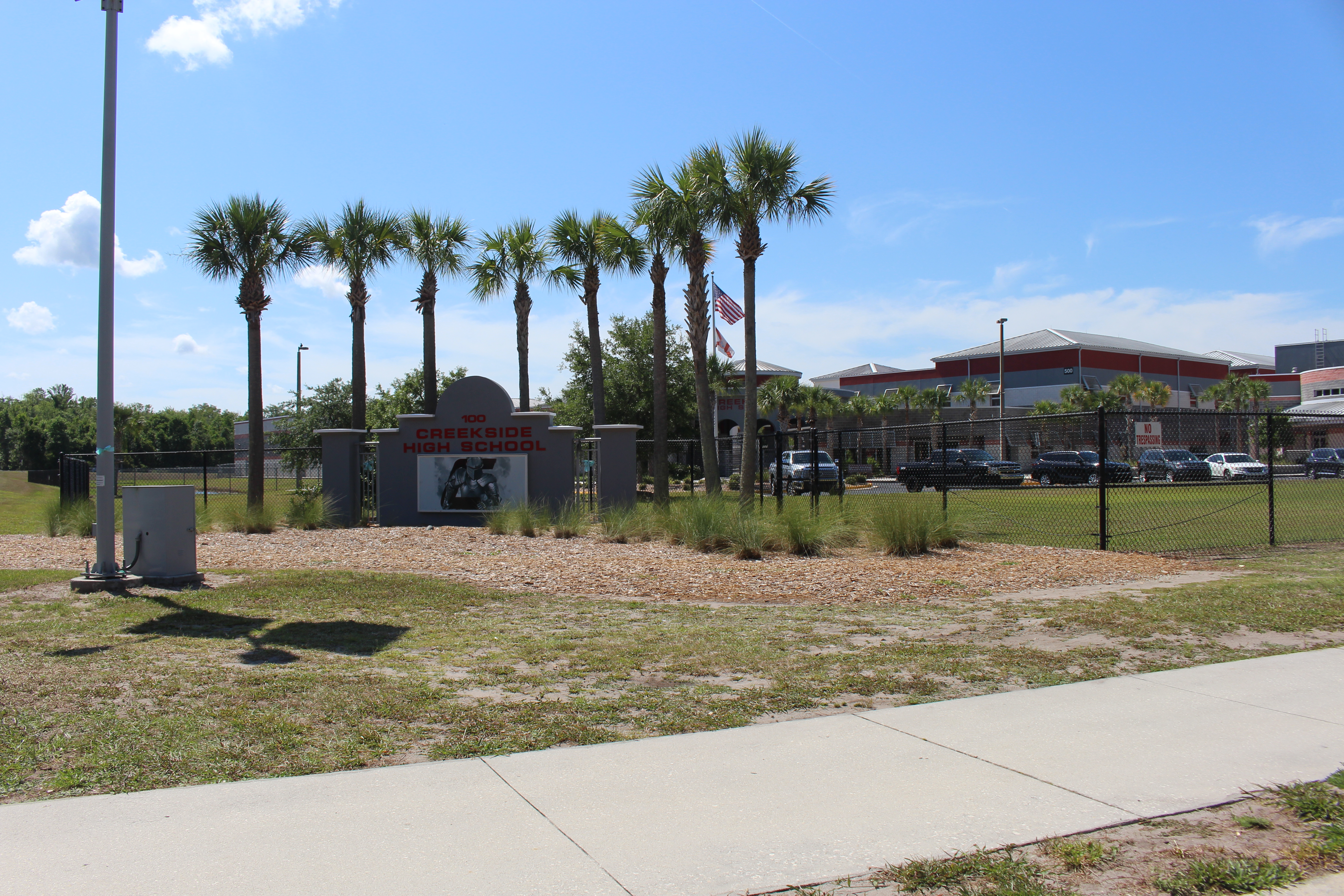

Location
- 100 Knights Lane; St. Johns, Florida 32259; United States; 30°04′51.50″N 81°33′45.46″W

Information
- Type: Public school
- Established: 2008
- Status: Operational
- School district: St. Johns County School District
- Superintendent: Dr. Brennan Asplen
- School number: 521
- Dean: John Highsmith, Heather Bundshuh, and David Hudson
- Principal: Steve McCormick
- Staff: 113.60 (FTE)
- Grades: 9 - 12
- Enrollment: 2,325 (2026-2027)
- Student to teacher ratio: 22.48
- Hours in school day: 9:35 a.m. - 4:05 p.m.
- Campus size: 77 acres (0.31 km^{2})
- Campus type: Rural
- Colours: Red, black, white
- Nickname: Knights
- Rivals: Bartram Trail High School, Ponte Vedra High School
- Website: www-chs.stjohns.k12.fl.us

Creekside High School (CHS) is a public high school in the St. Johns County School District, located in northwest St. Johns County, Florida (United States). The school was constructed to relieve overcrowding at Bartram Trail High School.

The attendance boundary includes a portion of Fruit Cove.

== Overview ==
The building has a capacity of 1,500 students and cost over $65 million. The school now services a total of 2550 students making the problem of overcrowding pandemic. The school building is a two-story octagon with an open courtyard in the center. The gymnasium and auditorium are attached on opposite sides, and the parking lots are between the school and most of the athletic facilities. The school opened for the 2008–2009 school year, and graduated their first senior class in June, 2010. The main feeder schools are Fruit Cove Middle School and Patriot Oaks Academy.

== Academies ==
The curriculum at Creekside High School offers academy programs in the areas of environmental/urban planning and emerging technology. Creekside now offers The Academy of Future Teachers as of the 2019–2020 school year.

== Advanced Academics ==
The advanced scholars program at Creekside High School gives students the option to participate in the rigorous programs of advanced placement, dual enrollment and honors courses.

== Athletics ==
The school mascot is the knight in armor and the colors are red, black and white.

The Creekside Knights Athletic Booster Club (CKABC) is a nonprofit organization of parents, coaches, student athletes, faculty, alumni & community members. The CKABC supports all CHS athletes, including fall, winter and spring sports programs. Contributions by families & supporters help maintain and improve playing fields and gymnasium, purchase equipment and uniforms, and fund the CKABC Scholarship Award.

Creekside has been district runner-up twice in 2011 and 2012.

2010 Men's Lacrosse District Champions

2015, 2016, and 2022 Boys' Cross Country State Champions

2024, 2025 Girls Cross Country State Champions

2024, 2026 Girl’s Track and Field State Champions

== Administration ==
=== Principals ===
Creekside High School has had three principals in its ten-year history. As of 2017 Steve McCormick had become the principal at Creekside. McCormick had previously been the principal of Fruit Cove Middle School, the main feeder to Creekside.

Principal	First year	Last year	Length of tenure by academic terms
Paul Abbatinozzi	2008–2009	2009–2010	2 years
Randy Johnson	2010–2011	2016–2017	7 years
Steve McCormick	2017–2018	present	

== Notable alumni ==
- Christian Miller (sprinter), track and field runner.
- Mike Phillips, expatriate basketball player
- Darious Williams, NFL player for the Baltimore Ravens, Los Angeles Rams, and Jacksonville Jaguars; Super Bowl LVI champion with the Los Angeles Rams
