= St. Johns, Florida =

St. Johns
- Unincorporated community
- Location within Florida Location within the United States
- Coordinates: 29°57′7.5″N 81°31′4.6″W
- State: Florida
- County: St. Johns
- Elevation: 10 ft (3.0 m)

Population (2023)
  - Total: 69,866
- Time zone: UTC-5 (Eastern (EST))
  - Summer (DST): UTC-4 (EDT)
- GNIS feature ID: 2797981

St. Johns is an unincorporated community in northwest St. Johns County, Florida, United States and a suburb of Jacksonville. The population as of the 2000 census was 18,063, though considerable growth has taken place in the past ten years. As of 2016, the population is estimated to be approximately 86,400 people. It is located in the Jacksonville metropolitan area, and lies approximately halfway between downtown Jacksonville and downtown St. Augustine.

== History ==
The area was formerly included in Jacksonville in United States Postal Service listings, despite the fact that it is located in St. Johns County. In 2005, the chamber of commerce decided on a new name to distinguish the community in a USPS poll. "St. Johns" was chosen over four other alternatives: Fruit Cove, St. Johns Cove, River Oaks, and Bartram. Several area activists and other residents, especially those in the historic communities of Fruit Cove and Switzerland, argued against any new name. However, the chamber council's "Anything but Jacksonville" effort cleared the way for St. Johns' adoption by USPS computers.

== Education ==
St. Johns is served by the St. Johns County School District. Elementary schools include Cunningham Creek Elementary, Durbin Creek Elementary, Hickory Creek Elementary, and Julington Creek Elementary. Timberlin Creek Elementary is located south of CR 210, but serves the Cimarrone Golf Club neighborhood of St. Johns. Ocean Palms Elementary serves the residents of Beachwalk. The primary middle schools are Fruit Cove Middle School and Switzerland Point Middle School. Alice B. Landrum Middle School zoning includes residents of Beachwalk. High school attendance is decided by zone, with students living north and west of certain lines attending Creekside High School, and the rest attending Bartram Trail High School. Beachside High School, located east of I-95, will open for the 2022-23 school year. There are three K-8 schools in the area: Liberty Pines Academy, Patriot Oaks Academy and Freedom Crossing Academy.

== Notable people ==
- Newman Darby (1928–2016), inventor of the sailboard
- Colin Guske (born 2007), soccer player
- Tai Lavatai, American football player
- Don Perlin (1929–2024), comic book artist, writer, and editor
