= Charlotte High School (Punta Gorda, Florida) =

Public school in Punta Gorda, Florida, US

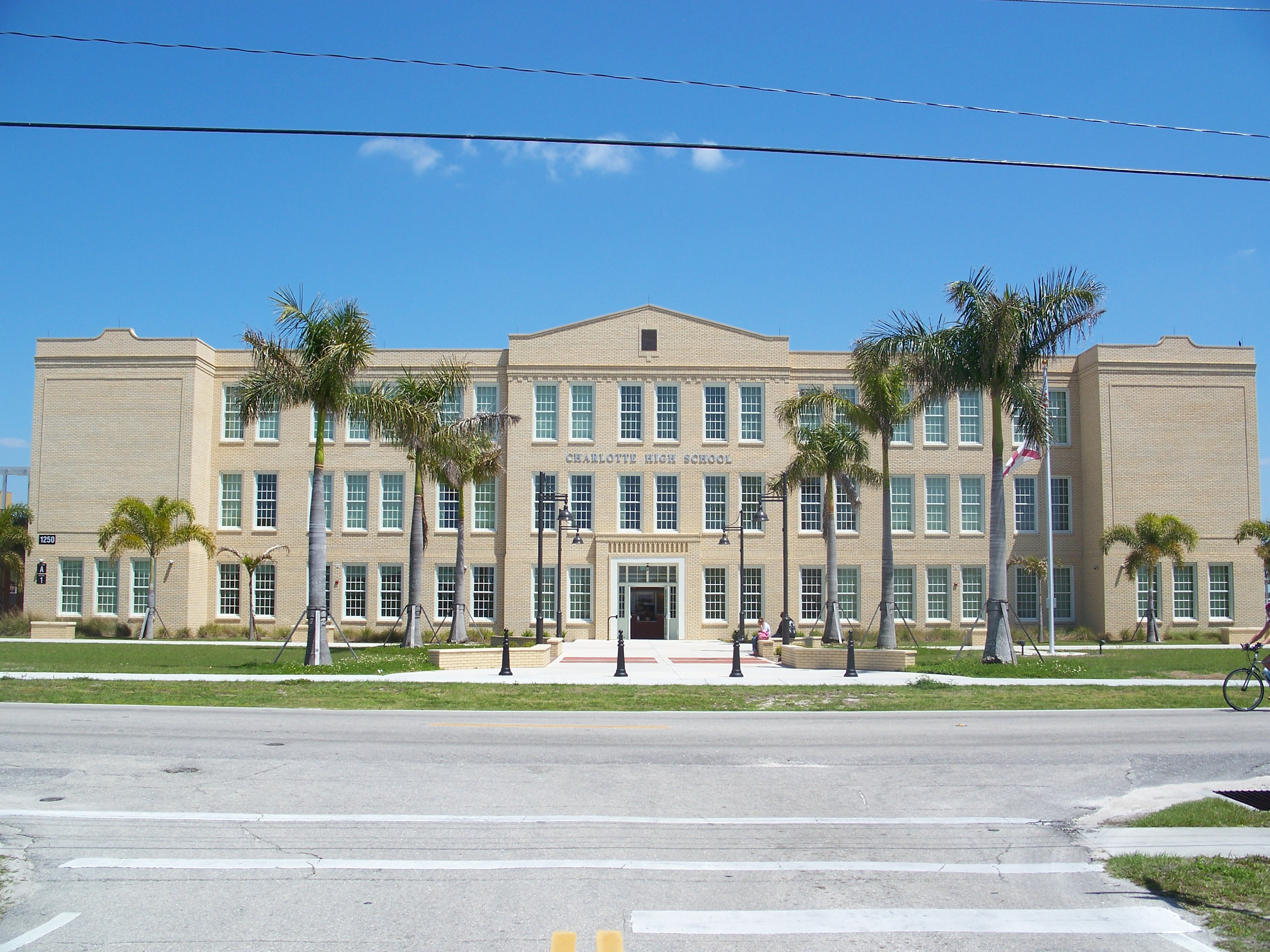
- The main building

Location
- 1250 Cooper Street; Punta Gorda, Florida; United States

Information
- Type: Free public secondary
- Established: 1926 (100 years ago)
- Principal: Angie Tallion
- Teaching staff: 92.00 (FTE)
- Grades: 9–12
- Enrollment: 1,976 (2023-2024)
- Student to teacher ratio: 21.48
- Campus size: 325,000 square feet (30,200 m^{2})
- Colors: Blue and gold
- Mascot: Fighting Tarpon
- Website: chs.yourcharlotteschools.net
- Charlotte High School
- U.S. National Register of Historic Places
- Location within Florida Location within the United States
- Coordinates: 26°55′39.77″N 82°2′22.02″W
- Architectural style: Masonry Vernacular with Neo-Classical elements
- MPS: Punta Gorda MPS
- NRHP reference No.: 90001796
- Added to NRHP: December 12, 1990

Charlotte High School is a historic public high school in Punta Gorda, Florida, United States, serving ninth to twelfth grade students. The school is part of the Charlotte County Public Schools district, with admission based primarily on the locations of students' homes. Established in 1926, Charlotte High is located at 1250 Cooper Street. The school carries the slogan of "Charlotte County's First and Finest" since it remained the only high school in Charlotte County for many years until its top rival schools, Port Charlotte High School and Lemon Bay High School, were built. With 1,596 students, Charlotte High School is the largest high school in Charlotte County by student population.

On December 12, 1990, its main three-story building was added to the United States' National Register of Historic Places. Several structures on the campus including the main building were destroyed by Hurricane Charley in 2004, causing Charlotte High School to need to be rebuilt, however the façade of the main building was preserved. The second phase of the school's rebuild opened in August 2009, housing all 9th and 10th graders in their academies. In January 2010, the 11th and 12th grade students moved into their academy in the existing renovated 2-story building. In August 2010, the remaining elective classes found their home on the fully complete Charlotte High School campus.

== History ==
Punta Gorda Grammar and High School had an enrollment of 150 students when it opened in 1928. Construction of a new school on Taylor Street began in 1911 due to overcrowding issues. However, by 1926, after the construction of the first bridge to cross Charlotte Harbor, busing increased Punta Gorda's enrollment to 1,000, which in turn led to the construction of Charlotte High School.

Its distinctive mascot, the fighting tarpon wearing its boxing gloves, was designed in 1959. The class of 1959 claims to have introduced the fighting tarpon emblem.

=== Hurricane Charley and its aftermath ===
Hurricane Charley hit the Punta Gorda area at the beginning of the school year on August 13, 2004, as a Category 4 hurricane, causing major damage to the school. After seventeen days of hiatus, the students attended Port Charlotte High School during the 12:45 - 6 p.m. afternoon shift for most of the 2004–2005 school year. Afterward, students were moved back on campus to portable classrooms. Charlotte High made up one of six schools in the county destroyed or heavily damaged; however, Champ's Cafe (the cafeteria), one of the gyms and the auditorium, the Charlotte Performing Arts Center, remained intact.

Despite its sustaining severe damage, it was decided to try to save the three-story main building, a historic landmark. The plan incorporated this building to have its entire interior to be redone, but its facade will remain and the rest of the campus will be built around its neoclassical style. A ceremony took place in late May 2007 for the groundbreaking of the aforementioned building and the new facility capable of grouping up to 1,800 students by class with a courtyard inside the linked structures. Harvard Jolly is the architectural firm working on the project.

The History Channel's inaugural Save Our History Grant was awarded in 2005 to the Charlotte County Historical Society, in partnership with high school students from Charlotte High School and Port Charlotte High School. Putting aside academic and athletic rivalry, the students collaborated to preserve their community's experience through oral history.

== Athletics ==
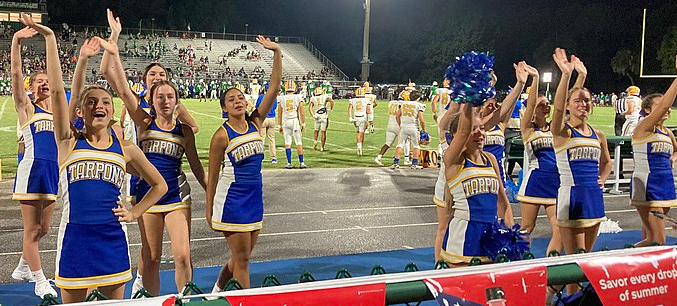
Lady Tarpon cheerleaders waving at the crowd at an away game hosted at Fort Myers High School

The school has a cheerleading team (varsity, junior varsity), cross country team (boys and girls separated), football team (varsity and junior varsity), golf team (boys and girls separated), swimming/diving team, basketball team (varsity, junior varsity; boys and girls separated), soccer team (varsity; boys and girls separated), weightlifting team (boys and girls separated), wrestling team (varsity and junior varsity), baseball team (varsity and junior varsity), softball team (varsity and junior varsity), tennis team (boys and girls separated), and track team (boys and girls separated).

The Lady Tarpons volleyball team was named state champions for division 5A in 2026.

== Notable alumni ==
- Mike Bellamy — professional football player
- Amanda Carr — BMX cycler
- Jeff Corsaletti — minor league baseball player
- Marcus Hardison — professional football player
- Matthew LaPorta — professional baseball player and Olympian
- Burton Lawless — professional football player
- Tommy Murphy — professional baseball player
- Jake Noll — professional baseball player
- Vanessa Oliver - member of the Florida House of Representatives, representing the 76th district
- Dagoberto Peña — professional basketball player
- D'Vonte Price (class of 2017) - professional football player.
- Nate Spears — professional baseball player
- Stantley Thomas-Oliver — professional football player
- Brad Yeager - member of the Florida House of Representatives, representing the 56th district
