= Mike Bellamy (running back) =

American gridiron football player (born 1991)

Profile
- Position: Running back

Personal information
- Born: October 16, 1991 (age 35); Nocatee, Florida
- Listed height: 5 ft 9 in (1.75 m)
- Listed weight: 175 lb (79 kg)

Career information
- High school: Punta Gorda (FL) Charlotte
- College: Fort Valley State
- NFL draft: 2014: undrafted

Career history
- Toronto Argonauts (2014)*
- * Offseason or practice squad member only

Michael Bellamy (born October 16, 1991) is an American former football running back. He spent time in college with Fort Valley State. He played the Clemson Tigers football team in 2011, but was ruled academically ineligible for the 2012 fall semester. He then enrolled at East Mississippi Community College, where he took part in off-season practice but was eventually dismissed for an undisclosed violation of team policy. He subsequently enrolled at Eastern Arizona College, where he played for the 2012 season, before transferring to the historically black Fort Valley State.

He attended Charlotte High School in Punta Gorda, Florida, where he was named Sporting News High School Athlete of the Year in 2010.

== Professional career ==
On March 11, 2014 Bellamy signed a contract with the Toronto Argonauts of the Canadian Football League. He was subsequently released May 9, 2014.
