= Dorchester, South Carolina =

Coordinates: 32°56′53″N 80°10′11″W

Dorchester was a town in the Province of South Carolina. Situated on the Ashley River about 18 miles (29 km) from Charleston, it was founded in February 1696 by followers of Reverend Joseph Lord from Dorchester, Massachusetts.

They named it after their home town, which had been named by earlier immigrants after the English town Dorchester). Dorchester was abandoned in 1751.

== History ==
The town was developed near the mouths of Dorchester Creek and Eagle's Creek, where they flowed into the Ashley. Both had been named by English colonists. The local Native Americans, of this region, referred to the land between the two mouths, as Boo-shoo-ee. The meaning of this name is not known, although the -ee suffix probably referred to water, given that nearly all other names ending in -ee referred to a water feature.

=== John Smith ===
In 1675, a wealthy Englishman named John Smith arrived in South Carolina with his wife Mary. As a personal friend of the influential Earl of Shaftesbury, he was given a generous land grant. On November 20, 1676, he was given 1,800 acres (7 km^{2}) of land that included the Boo-shoo-ee region and the nearby Boshoe Swamp. He was titled "John Smith of Boo-shoo". When he died in December 1682, his widowed wife remarried, to Arthur Middleton. He also died, in 1684. She married again to Ralph Izard. Since John Smith and his wife had been childless, his land grant lapsed after he died. (He and his wife were buried in a cemetery located at the end of Marsh Overlook drive and Turning Tide drive in Dorchester County.)

=== Founding ===
On October 20, 1695, Reverend Joseph Lord and two of his supporters were officially given permission by the church of Dorchester, Massachusetts to lead followers south into South Carolina. Two days later, on October 22, Lord held a meeting to recruit parishioners to accompany him to establish a new township. the proposal was endorsed by Reverend John Danforth, and six more agreed to embark, bringing the total to nine prospective emigrants. Four of these, however, do not appear in any records as having settled in the new town, so they may have died along the way, or changed their minds. Settler William Pratt wrote in this diary that the group were fewer than nine when they arrived in the Province of South Carolina.

On December 5, a skiff carrying the settlers left the Boston Town Dock. A storm engulfed the ship four days into the journey, on December 9, nearly sinking it, and the passengers held a day of prayer for deliverance through the maelstrom. The storm's wind blew southward, however, and it actually propelled the ship so quickly that it arrived in Charles Town after only six days on December 20, when the journey should have taken two weeks. There was a mixed reaction to their arrival. Many residents, including the governor, Joseph Blake, were of the opinion that the party should settle on the Pon Pon River, at New London. However, Joseph Lord did obtain a 1,800-acre (7 km^{2}) land grant- the same that had lapsed John Smith's ownership. The immigrant party settled the Boo-shoo-ee area, which had been surveyed in advance, in late 1684, by one of the settlers, William Norman. On February 2, the party held church services for the first time under a large oak tree.

A drawing of an old fort built at Dorchester

The new settlers first built crude wooden lean-tos to live in, and set to work on the more important task – building a church. They named the church Old White Meeting House, after the Reverend John White of England, who had supported their emigration. They named the new town as Dorchester and built it in the style they knew from England and the Massachusetts Bay Colony. On November 1 of that year, after the town had been established, the church at Dorchester, Massachusetts approved the emigration of dozens more to the new village.

=== Demise ===
Reverend Lord returned to the Massachusetts colony in 1720, and the town in Dorchester, South Carolina, gradually declined. The residents were unaccustomed to the hot climate. In addition, others became ill from local diseases, such as malaria or fevers. The natural resources near the town were insufficient to support a large population.

In 1751, the townspeople abandoned the village. Most resettled at Midway in the Georgia colony, though some moved to North Carolina and others back to Massachusetts.

In 1781, during the American Revolution, the Old White Meeting House burned down. Although it was later rebuilt, it was abandoned after the American Civil War. It was destroyed during the 1886 Charleston earthquake, which had effects reaching a wide area.

=== Present ===
The ruins of the Old White Meeting House and its cemetery are owned and maintained by its successor congregation, Summerville Presbyterian Church.
