= 2011 Atlantic Coast Conference football season =

2011 ACC football season
- League: NCAA Division I Football Bowl Subdivision
- Sport: Football
- Duration: September 1, 2011 – January 4, 2012
- Teams: 12

Regular season
- Season champions: Clemson
- Season MVP: David Wilson
- Atlantic champions: Clemson Tigers
- Coastal champions: Virginia Tech Hokies

ACC Championship Game
- Champions: Clemson Tigers

ACC seasons
- ← 2010 2012 →

2011 Atlantic Coast Conference football standings
	Conf.			Overall
Team	W		L	W		L
Atlantic Division
No. 22 Clemson x$	6	–	2	10	–	4
Wake Forest	5	–	3	6	–	7
No. 23 Florida State	5	–	3	9	–	4
NC State	4	–	4	8	–	5
Boston College	3	–	5	4	–	8
Maryland	1	–	7	2	–	10
Coastal Division
No. 21 Virginia Tech x%	7	–	1	11	–	3
Virginia	5	–	3	8	–	5
Georgia Tech	5	–	3	8	–	5
Miami (FL)	3	–	5	6	–	6
North Carolina	3	–	5	7	–	6
Duke	1	–	7	3	–	9
Championship: Clemson 38, Virginia Tech 10
$ – BCS representative as conference champion; % – BCS at-large representative; x – Division champion/co-champions; Rankings from AP Poll

The 2011 ACC football season is an NCAA football season that will be played from September 1, 2011, to January 4, 2012. The Atlantic Coast Conference consists of 12 members in two divisions. The Atlantic division consists of Boston College, Clemson, Florida State, Maryland, North Carolina State and Wake Forest. The Coastal division consists of Duke, Georgia Tech, Miami, North Carolina, Virginia, and Virginia Tech. The division champions will meet on December 3 in the 2011 ACC Championship Game, located in Charlotte, North Carolina at Bank of America Stadium.

== Preseason ==
=== Preseason Poll ===
The 2011 ACC Preseason Poll was announced at the ACC Football Kickoff meetings in Pinehurst, North Carolina on July 25. Virginia Tech was voted to win Coastal division while Florida State was voted to win the Atlantic division and the conference. Montel Harris of Boston College was voted the Preseason ACC Player of the Year.

==== Atlantic Division poll ====
1. Florida State – 420 (65 first place votes)
2. Clemson – 286 (4)
3. North Carolina State – 270
4. Boston College – 224 (2)
5. Maryland – 211
6. Wake Forest – 80

==== Coastal Division poll ====
1. Virginia Tech – 421 (66)
2. Miami – 328 (4)
3. North Carolina – 287
4. Georgia Tech – 226 (1)
5. Virginia – 132
6. Duke – 96

==== Predicted ACC Championship Game Winner ====
1. Florida State–50
2. Virginia Tech–18
3. Clemson–2
4. Boston College–1

==== Preseason ACC Player of the Year ====
1. Montel Harris, BC – 26
2. E. J. Manuel, FSU – 14
3. Luke Kuechly, BC – 12
4. David Wilson, Virginia Tech – 8
5. Danny O'Brien, Maryland – 4
6. Andre Ellington, CLEM – 3
7. Lamar Miller, MIA – 2
8. Sean Spence, MIA – 1
9. Brandon Jenkins, FSU – 1

=== Preseason All Conference Teams ===
==== Offense ====
Position	Player	School
Wide receiver	Conner Vernon	Duke
Wide receiver	Dwight Jones	North Carolina
Tight end	George Bryan	NC State
Tackle	Blake DeChristopher	Virginia Tech
Tackle	Andrew Datko	Florida State
Guard	Brandon Washington	Miami
Guard	Omoregie Uzzi	Georgia Tech
Center	Tyler Horn	Miami
Quarterback	EJ Manuel	Florida State
Running back	Montel Harris	Boston College
Running back	Andre Ellington	Clemson

==== Defense ====
Position	Player	School
Defensive end	Brandon Jenkins	Florida State
Defensive end	Quinton Coples	North Carolina
Defensive tackle	Tydreke Powell	North Carolina
Defensive tackle	Brandon Thompson	Clemson
Linebacker	Luke Kuechly	Boston College
Linebacker	Sean Spence	Miami
Linebacker	Kenny Tate	Maryland
Cornerback	Chase Minnifield	Virginia
Cornerback	Jayron Hosley	Virginia Tech
Safety	Ray-Ray Armstrong	Miami
Safety	Eddie Whitley	Virginia Tech

==== Specialist ====
Position	Player	School
Placekicker	Will Snyderwine	Duke
Punter	Dawson Zimmerman	Clemson
Specialist	Greg Reid	Florida State

== Coaches ==
During the offseason, two ACC schools, Maryland and Miami, hired new head coaches. Maryland bought out the last year of 10 year coach, Ralph Friedgen's contract. They hired Randy Edsall who had been the head coach at UConn for 12 years. Miami fired their head coach of 4 years, Randy Shannon, at the conclusion of the Hurricanes' regular season. They in turn hired coach Al Golden, who was the 5 year head coach of Temple. In an unexpected turn of events, on July 27, 2011, UNC chancellor Holden Thorp announced that UNC's board of trustees decided to dismiss Butch Davis as the head coach of the football team. The announcement came a week before the start of fall training camp. The firing was cited as being due to the investigations by the NCAA into academic fraud, impermissible benefits, and talking to agents in the 2010 season. The next day on the 28th, Everett Withers, the defensive coordinator of the past 3 years, was named as the interim head coach.

NOTE: Stats shown are before the beginning of the season

Team	Head coach	Years at school	Overall record	Record at school	ACC record
Boston College	Frank Spaziani	4	16–11	16–11	9–7
Clemson	Dabo Swinney	4	19–15	19–15	13–8
Duke	David Cutcliffe	4	56–53	12–24	5–19
Florida State	Jimbo Fisher	2	10–4	10–4	6–2
Georgia Tech	Paul Johnson	4	133–52	25–15	16–8
Maryland	Randy Edsall	1	74–70	0–0	0–0
Miami	Al Golden	1	27–34	0–0	0–0
North Carolina	Everett Withers	1	0-0	0-0	0-0
NC State	Tom O'Brien	5	100–70	25–25	14–18
Virginia	Mike London	2	28–13	4–8	1–7
Virginia Tech	Frank Beamer	25	240–118–4	198–95–2	46–10
Wake Forest	Jim Grobe	10	100–96–1	67–63	34–51

== ACC vs. BCS opponents ==
The Atlantic Coast Conference had a losing season vs. BCS opponents in 2011 with a record of 8 wins and 13 losses. In rivalry games vs. BCS opponents the ACC went 1–4 with the only win coming from the Florida State Seminoles over the Florida Gators. The ACC also had three teams play Notre Dame in 2011 and recorded a 0–3 record against the Fighting Irish.

NOTE:. Games with a * next to the home team represent a neutral site game

Date	Visitor	Home	Significance	Winning team
September 1	Wake Forest	Syracuse		Syracuse
September 3	Northwestern	Boston College		Northwestern
September 10	Rutgers	North Carolina		North Carolina
September 10	Stanford	Duke		Stanford
September 10	Virginia	Indiana		Virginia
September 17	Oklahoma	Florida State		Oklahoma
September 17	Ohio State	Miami		Miami
September 17	West Virginia	Maryland	Maryland–West Virginia football rivalry	West Virginia
September 17	Auburn	Clemson	Auburn–Clemson football rivalry	Clemson
September 17	Kansas	Georgia Tech		Georgia Tech
September 22	NC State	Cincinnati		Cincinnati
September 24	Kansas State	Miami		Kansas State
October 8	Louisville	North Carolina		North Carolina
November 5	Notre Dame	Wake Forest		Notre Dame
November 12	Maryland	Notre Dame		Notre Dame
November 19	Miami	South Florida		Miami
November 19	Boston College	Notre Dame	Holy War	Notre Dame
November 26	Florida State	Florida	Florida–Florida State football rivalry	Florida State
November 26	Georgia	Georgia Tech	Clean, Old-Fashioned Hate	Georgia
November 26	Clemson	South Carolina	Battle of the Palmetto State	South Carolina
November 26	Vanderbilt	Wake Forest		Vanderbilt

== Rankings ==
Legend
	Improvement in ranking
	Drop in ranking
	Not ranked previous week
RV	Received votes but were not ranked in Top 25 of poll

		Pre	Wk 1	Wk 2	Wk 3	Wk 4	Wk 5	Wk 6	Wk 7	Wk 8	Wk 9	Wk 10	Wk 11	Wk 12	Wk 13	Wk 14	Final
Boston College	AP																
Boston College	C																
Boston College	BCS	Not released															
Clemson	AP		RV		21	13	8	8	8	6	11	9	7	18	21	14	22
Clemson	C	RV	RV	RV	22	15	8	8	8	6	12	10	8	17	21	14	22
Clemson	BCS	Not released							7	5	11	9	7	17	20	15	
Duke	AP																
Duke	C						RV										
Duke	BCS	Not released															
Florida State	AP	6	5	5	11	23	23				RV	RV	23		25	25	23
Florida State	C	5	4	5	14	24	22				RV	RV	22	RV	24	25	23
Florida State	BCS	Not released											25				
Georgia Tech	AP		RV	RV	25	21	13	12	20	RV	22	20	RV	25	RV	RV	
Georgia Tech	C	RV	RV	RV	24	21	13	12	19	RV	23	19	23	21	RV	RV	
Georgia Tech	BCS	Not released							22		23	21		23			
Maryland	AP	RV	RV	RV	RV												
Maryland	C		RV	RV													
Maryland	BCS	Not released															
Miami	AP	RV			RV					RV							
Miami	C	RV			RV					RV		RV					
Miami	BCS	Not released															
North Carolina	AP				RV			RV									
North Carolina	C	RV	RV	RV	25	RV	RV	RV	RV		RV						
North Carolina	BCS	Not released															
NC State	AP	RV	RV														
NC State	C	RV															
NC State	BCS	Not released															
Virginia	AP											RV	RV	24	RV	RV	RV
Virginia	C								RV			RV	RV	25	RV	RV	RV
Virginia	BCS	Not released															
Virginia Tech	AP	13	11	13	13	11	21	19	16	15	12	10	9	6	5	17	21
Virginia Tech	C	13	11	12	11	10	17	17	14	15	11	9	7	4	3	11	17
Virginia Tech	BCS	Not released							12	12	12	10	8	5	5	11	
Wake Forest	AP							RV	RV								
Wake Forest	C							RV		RV							
Wake Forest	BCS	Not released															

== Bowl Games ==
Bowl Game	Date	Stadium	City	Television	Matchup/Result	Attendance	Payout (US$) per team
BCS
Allstate Sugar Bowl	January 3, 2012	Mercedes-Benz Superdome	New Orleans	ESPN	Michigan 23, Virginia Tech 20	64,512	$17,000,000
Discover Orange Bowl	January 4, 2012	Sun Life Stadium	Miami Gardens, Florida	ESPN	West Virginia 70, Clemson 33	67,563	$17,000,000
Non-BCS
Advocare V100 Independence Bowl	December 26, 2011	Independence Stadium	Shreveport, Louisiana	ESPN2	Missouri 41, North Carolina 24	41,728	$1,100,000
Belk Bowl	December 27, 2011	Bank of America Stadium	Charlotte, North Carolina	ESPN	NC State 31, Louisville 24	58,427	$1,000,000
Champs Sports Bowl	December 29, 2011	Florida Citrus Bowl Stadium	Orlando, Florida	ESPN	Florida State 18, Notre Dame 14	68,305	$2,125,000
Franklin American Mortgage Music City Bowl	December 30, 2011	LP Field	Nashville, Tennessee	ESPN	Mississippi State 23, Wake Forest 17	55,208	$1,700,000
Hyundai Sun Bowl	December 31, 2011	Sun Bowl Stadium	El Paso, Texas	CBS	Utah 30, Georgia Tech 27	48,123	$1,900,000
Chick-fil-A Bowl	December 31, 2011	Georgia Dome	Atlanta	ESPN	Auburn 43, Virginia 24	72,919	$3,350,000

== Postseason ==
=== All-conference teams ===
==== First Team ====
Offense

Position	Player	School
Wide receiver	Sammy Watkins	Clemson
Wide receiver	Chris Givens	Wake Forest
Tight end	Dwayne Allen	Clemson
Tackle	Blake DeChristopher	Virginia Tech
Tackle	Zebrie Sanders	Florida State
Guard	Austin Pasztor	Virginia
Guard	Omoregie Uzzi	Georgia Tech
Center	Dalton Freeman	Clemson
Quarterback	Tajh Boyd	Clemson
Running back	David Wilson	Virginia Tech
Running back	Giovani Bernard	North Carolina
Placekicker	Dustin Hopkins	Florida State
Specialist	T. J. Graham	NC State

Defense

Position	Player	School
Defensive end	Andre Branch	Clemson
Defensive end	Quinton Coples	North Carolina
Defensive tackle	Joe Vellano	Maryland
Defensive tackle	Matthew Conrath	Virginia
Linebacker	Luke Kuechly	Boston College
Linebacker	Sean Spence	Miami
Linebacker	Zach Brown	North Carolina
Cornerback	David Amerson	NC State
Cornerback	Chase Minnifield	Virginia
Safety	Matt Daniels	Duke
Safety	Josh Bush	Wake Forest
Punter	Shawn Powell	Florida State

==== Second Team ====
Offense

Position	Player	School
Wide receiver	Dwight Jones	North Carolina
Wide receiver	Conner Vernon	Duke
Tight end	George Bryan	NC State
Tackle	Oday Aboushi	Virginia
Tackle	James Hurst	North Carolina
Guard	Jaymes Brooks	Virginia Tech
Guard	Jonathan Cooper	North Carolina
Guard	Joe Looney	Wake Forest
Center	Tyler Horn	Miami
Quarterback	Logan Thomas	Virginia Tech
Running back	Lamar Miller	Miami
Running back	Andre Ellington	Clemson
Placekicker	Chandler Catanzaro	Clemson
Specialist	Sammy Watkins	Clemson

Defense

Position	Player	School
Defensive end	Brandon Jenkins	Florida State
Defensive end	James Gayle	Virginia Tech
Defensive tackle	Brandon Thompson	Clemson
Defensive tackle	Nikita Whitlock	Wake Forest
Linebacker	Terrell Manning	NC State
Linebacker	Julian Burnett	Georgia Tech
Linebacker	Steve Greer	Virginia
Cornerback	Jayron Hosley	Virginia Tech
Cornerback	Kyle Fuller	Virginia Tech
Safety	Eddie Whitley	Virginia Tech
Safety	Lamarcus Joyner	Florida State
Punter	Alex King	Duke

=== ACC Individual Awards ===
ACC Player of the Year

RB David Wilson- Virginia Tech

Offensive Player of the Year

RB David Wilson- Virginia Tech

Defensive Player of the Year

LB Luke Kuechly- Boston College

Rookie of the Year

WR Sammy Watkins- Clemson

Offensive Rookie of the Year

WR Sammy Watkins- Clemson

Defensive Rookie of the Year

CB Merrill Noel- Wake Forest

Coach of the Year

Mike London- Virginia

Brian Piccolo Award

RB Giovani Bernard- North Carolina

Jim Tatum Award

WR Danny Coale- Virginia Tech

=== National Awards ===
Butkus Award

LB Luke Kuechly- Boston College

John Mackey Award

TE Dwayne Allen- Clemson

Lombardi Award

LB Luke Kuechly- Boston College

Jack Tatum Award

CB David Amerson- NC State
