= 2011 North Carolina Tar Heels football team =

American college football season

2011 North Carolina Tar Heels football

Independence Bowl, L 24–41 vs. Missouri
- Conference: Atlantic Coast Conference
- Coastal Division
- Record: 7–6 (3–5 ACC)
- Head coach: Everett Withers (interim, 1st season)
- Offensive coordinator: John Shoop (5th season)
- Offensive scheme: Pro-style
- Defensive coordinator: Art Kaufman (1st season)
- Base defense: 4–3
- Captains: Casey Barth; Cam Holland; Matt Merletti; Kevin Reddick
- Home stadium: Kenan Memorial Stadium

2011 Atlantic Coast Conference football standings
| | Conf. | | | Overall |
| Team | W | | L | W | | L |
|---|---|---|---|---|---|---|
Atlantic Division
| No. 22 Clemson x$ | 6 | – | 2 | 10 | – | 4 |
| Wake Forest | 5 | – | 3 | 6 | – | 7 |
| No. 23 Florida State | 5 | – | 3 | 9 | – | 4 |
| NC State | 4 | – | 4 | 8 | – | 5 |
| Boston College | 3 | – | 5 | 4 | – | 8 |
| Maryland | 1 | – | 7 | 2 | – | 10 |
Coastal Division
| No. 21 Virginia Tech x% | 7 | – | 1 | 11 | – | 3 |
| Virginia | 5 | – | 3 | 8 | – | 5 |
| Georgia Tech | 5 | – | 3 | 8 | – | 5 |
| Miami (FL) | 3 | – | 5 | 6 | – | 6 |
| North Carolina | 3 | – | 5 | 7 | – | 6 |
| Duke | 1 | – | 7 | 3 | – | 9 |
Championship: Clemson 38, Virginia Tech 10
$ – BCS representative as conference champion; % – BCS at-large representative; x – Division champion/co-champions; Rankings from AP Poll

The 2011 North Carolina Tar Heels football team represented the University of North Carolina at Chapel Hill as a member of Coastal Division of the Atlantic Coast Conference (ACC) during the 2011 NCAA Division I FBS football season. The team was led by interim head coach Everett Withers and played their home games at Kenan Memorial Stadium. The Tar Heels finished the season 7–6 overall and 3–5 in ACC play to tie for fourth in the Coastal Division. They were invited to the Independence Bowl, where they were defeated by Missouri, 24–41.

== Recruiting ==
After National Signing Day (February 3, 2011) the Tar Heel's recruiting class was ranked as the 16th best class in the nation by the three major recruiting sites (espn.com, rivals.com, and scout.com). Marquise Williams (QB), Travis Riley (RB), T.J. Thorpe (Ath), Landon Turner (OG), and Sylvester Williams (DT) (Junior College Transfer) all enrolled in January 2011. The entire 2011 recruiting class included 26 players, 22 of which were either four-star or three-star recruits.

College recruiting information (2011)
| Name | Hometown | School | Height | Weight | 40^{‡} | Commit date |
|---|---|---|---|---|---|---|
| Kiaro Holts; OT | Indianapolis, IN | Warren Central HS | 6 ft 5 in (1.96 m) | 267 lb (121 kg) | 5.4 | Jun 25, 2010 |
| Kiaro Holts; OT | Recruit ratings: Scout: Rivals: (81) | | | | | |
| T.J. Thorpe; ATH | Durham, NC | C E Jordan HS | 6 ft 0 in (1.83 m) | 180 lb (82 kg) | 4.5 | Mar 7, 2010 |
| T.J. Thorpe; ATH | Recruit ratings: Scout: Rivals: (81) | | | | | |
| Travis Hughes; ILB | Virginia Beach, VA | Kempsville HS | 6 ft 1 in (1.85 m) | 224 lb (102 kg) | 4.57 | Dec 18, 2010 |
| Travis Hughes; ILB | Recruit ratings: Scout: Rivals: (80) | | | | | |
| Travis Riley; RB | Kannapolis, NC | A L Brown HS | 6 ft 1 in (1.85 m) | 210 lb (95 kg) | 4.54 | Apr 2, 2010 |
| Travis Riley; RB | Recruit ratings: Scout: Rivals: (80) | | | | | |
| Eric Ebron; TE | Greensboro, NC | Ben L Smith HS | 6 ft 5 in (1.96 m) | 221 lb (100 kg) | 4.67 | Mar 18, 2010 |
| Eric Ebron; TE | Recruit ratings: Scout: Rivals: (80) | | | | | |
| Landon Turner; OG | Harrisonburg, VA | Harrisonburg HS | 6 ft 5 in (1.96 m) | 308 lb (140 kg) | 5.3 | Jul 11, 2010 |
| Landon Turner; OG | Recruit ratings: Scout: Rivals: (80) | | | | | |
| Jack Tabb; TE | Red Bank, NJ | Red Bank Catholic HS | 6 ft 4 in (1.93 m) | 233 lb (106 kg) | 4.8 | Jan 14, 2011 |
| Jack Tabb; TE | Recruit ratings: Scout: Rivals: (79) | | | | | |
| Marquise Williams; QB | Charlotte, NC | Mallard Creek HS | 6 ft 3 in (1.91 m) | 217 lb (98 kg) | 4.75 | Jun 7, 2010 |
| Marquise Williams; QB | Recruit ratings: Scout: Rivals: (79) | | | | | |
| Norkeithus Otis; OLB | Gastonia, NC | Ashbrook HS | 6 ft 3 in (1.91 m) | 197 lb (89 kg) | 4.6 | Nov 5, 2010 |
| Norkeithus Otis; OLB | Recruit ratings: Scout: Rivals: (79) | | | | | |
| Tim Scott; S | Stafford, VA | Colonial Forge HS | 6 ft 0 in (1.83 m) | 176 lb (80 kg) | 4.4 | Nov 5, 2010 |
| Tim Scott; S | Recruit ratings: Scout: Rivals: (79) | | | | | |
| Delvon Simmons^ DT | McKeesport, PA | McKeesport Area SHS | 6 ft 5 in (1.96 m) | 264 lb (120 kg) | N/A | Feb 2, 2011 |
| Delvon Simmons^ DT | Recruit ratings: Scout: Rivals: (79) | | | | | |
| Romar Morris; RB | Salisbury, NC | Salisbury HS | 5 ft 10 in (1.78 m) | 173 lb (78 kg) | 4.36 | Aug 16, 2010 |
| Romar Morris; RB | Recruit ratings: Scout: Rivals: (79) | | | | | |
| Devonte Brown; DT | Fayetteville, NC | Jack Britt | 6 ft 4 in (1.93 m) | 270 lb (120 kg) | N/A | Nov 14, 2010 |
| Devonte Brown; DT | Recruit ratings: Scout: Rivals: (79) | | | | | |
| Tyler Alberts; DE | Lewisville, NC | Forsyth Country Day School | 6 ft 8 in (2.03 m) | 215 lb (98 kg) | 4.7 | Oct 4, 2010 |
| Tyler Alberts; DE | Recruit ratings: Scout: Rivals: (78) | | | | | |
| Shawn Underwood; DT | Fuquay-Varina, NC | Fuquay-Varina HS | 6 ft 2 in (1.88 m) | 316 lb (143 kg) | 4.97 | Jul 13, 2010 |
| Shawn Underwood; DT | Recruit ratings: Scout: Rivals: (78) | | | | | |
| Jarrod James; OG | Pikeville, NC | Charles B Aycock HS | 6 ft 4 in (1.93 m) | 279 lb (127 kg) | 5.0 | Mar 20, 2010 |
| Jarrod James; OG | Recruit ratings: Scout: Rivals: (78) | | | | | |
| Keeon Virgile; OLB | North Miami Beach, FL | North Miami Beach HS | 6 ft 1.5 in (1.87 m) | 205 lb (93 kg) | N/A | Feb 2, 2011 |
| Keeon Virgile; OLB | Recruit ratings: Scout: Rivals: (78) | | | | | |
| Brandon Ellerbe; S | Wadesboro, NC | Anson HS | 6 ft 0.5 in (1.84 m) | 199 lb (90 kg) | N/A | Feb 2, 2011 |
| Brandon Ellerbe; S | Recruit ratings: Scout: Rivals: (78) | | | | | |
| Miller Snyder; K | Charlotte, NC | Myers Park HS | 6 ft 2 in (1.88 m) | 183 lb (83 kg) | N/A | Dec 15, 2010 |
| Miller Snyder; K | Recruit ratings: Scout: Rivals: (78) | | | | | |
| Alex Dixon; CB | Clearwater, FL | Countryside HS | 6 ft 1 in (1.85 m) | 183 lb (83 kg) | N/A | Nov 14, 2010 |
| Alex Dixon; CB | Recruit ratings: Scout: Rivals: (78) | | | | | |
| Darien Rankin; S | Salisbury, NC | Salisbury HS | 5 ft 11 in (1.80 m) | 185 lb (84 kg) | 4.6 | Jul 7, 2010 |
| Darien Rankin; S | Recruit ratings: Scout: Rivals: (75) | | | | | |
| Kameron Jackson; ATH/WR | Madison, AL | Madison Academy | 6 ft 0 in (1.83 m) | 180 lb (82 kg) | 4.5 | Jul 2, 2010 |
| Kameron Jackson; ATH/WR | Recruit ratings: Scout: Rivals: (75) | | | | | |
| Samuel Smiley; ATH/DB | Jacksonville, FL | William M. Raines HS | 6 ft 0 in (1.83 m) | 170 lb (77 kg) | N/A | Feb 2, 2011 |
| Samuel Smiley; ATH/DB | Recruit ratings: Scout: Rivals: (71) | | | | | |
| Stephen Houston; RB | Independence, KS | Independence Community College | 5 ft 10.5 in (1.79 m) | 225 lb (102 kg) | N/A | Feb 1, 2011 |
| Stephen Houston; RB | Recruit ratings: Scout: Rivals: (N/A (Junior College)) | | | | | |
| Sylvester Williams; DT | Coffeyville, KS | Coffeyville Community College | 6 ft 3 in (1.91 m) | 306 lb (139 kg) | 5.1 | Dec 15, 2010 |
| Sylvester Williams; DT | Recruit ratings: Scout: Rivals: (N/A (Junior College)) | | | | | |
| Fabby Desir; LB | Scranton, PA | Lackawanna Community College | 6 ft 1 in (1.85 m) | 227 lb (103 kg) | 4.5 | Feb 25, 2011 |
| Fabby Desir; LB | Recruit ratings: Rivals: (N/A (Junior College)) | | | | | |
Overall recruit ranking: Scout: 16 Rivals: 16
‡ Refers to 40-yard dash; Note: In many cases, Scout, Rivals, 247Sports, On3, and ESPN may conflict in their listings of height, weight and 40 time.; In these cases, the average was taken. ESPN grades are on a 100-point scale.; Sources: "North Carolina Commit List for 2011". Rivals.; "Scout.com Football Recruiting: North Carolina". Scout.; "RecruitTracker 2011: North Carolina". ESPN.; "Scout.com Team Recruiting Rankings". Scout.; "2011 Team Ranking". Rivals.com.

^Delvon Simmons requested to be released from his letter of intent in March 2011. He was granted release, and will not play for UNC.

== Coaching staff ==
On July 27, 2011, UNC chancellor Holden Thorp announced that UNC's board of trustees decided to dismiss Butch Davis as the head coach of the football team. The announcement comes a week before the start of fall training camp. The firing is due to the investigations by the NCAA into academic fraud, impermissible benefits, and talking to agents in the 2010 season. The next day on the 28th, Everett Withers, the defensive coordinator of the past 3 years, was named as the interim head coach. Athletic director, Dick Baddour, also announced, on this day, that he would be stepping down from his role once a new athletic director is found for the university. Baddour added that he wanted the new athletic director to be in charge of hiring the university's next head football coach.

| Name | Position | Seasons in Position |
| Everett Withers | Interim head coach | 1st (4th at school) |
| Brian Baker | Defensive Line | 1st |
| Ken Browning | Running backs | 18th |
| Tom Myslinski | Strength and conditioning coordinator | 1st |
| Troy Douglas | Defensive Backs | 3rd |
| Art Kaufman | Linebackers | 3rd |
| Allen Mogridge | Tight Ends/recruiting coordinator/special teams coordinator | 3rd |
| Sam Pittman | Associate head coach/offensive line | 5th |
| John Shoop | Offensive coordinator / quarterbacks | 5th |
| Charlie Williams | Wide Receivers | 5th |
| Steve Sisa | Safeties | 1st |

== Roster ==
2011 North Carolina Tar Heels football team roster
Players
Coaches
Offense

| Pos. | # | Name | Class |
|---|---|---|---|
| WR | 3 | Joshua Adams | So |
| OL | 69 | Nick Appel | RFr |
| RB | 26 | Giovani Bernard | RFr |
| QB | 15 | A.J. Blue | So |
| OL | 60 | Russell Bodine | RFr |
| G | 76 | Travis Bond | Jr |
| WR | 87 | Jheranie Boyd | Jr |
| FB | 38 | Curtis Byrd | Sr |
| G | 62 | David Collins | So |
| C | 64 | Jonathan Cooper | Jr |
| TE | 85 | Eric Ebron | Fr |
| TE | 84 | Sean Fitzpatrick | RFr |
| OT | 71 | Carl Gaskins | Sr |
| QB | 14 | Braden Hanson | Jr |
| WR | 88 | Erik Highsmith | Jr |
| C | 65 | Cam Holland | Sr |
| OL | 72 | Kiaro Holts | Fr |
| RB | 32 | Ryan Houston | Sr |
| OT | 68 | James Hurst | So |
| TE | 89 | Nelson Hurst | Jr |
| OL | 51 | Jarrod James | Fr |
| G | 63 | Peyton Jenest | Jr |
| WR | 83 | Dwight Jones | Sr |
| RB | 44 | Matt Kolojejchick | Jr |
| OT | 75 | T.J. Leifheit | Fr |
| OL | 58 | Jordan Marsh | So |
| RB | 21 | Romar Morris | Fr |
| FB | 39 | Kenny Owens | Jr |
| FB | 45 | Devon Ramsay (injured) | Sr |
| QB | 2 | Bryn Renner | So |
| RB | 8 | Travis Riley | Fr |
| TE | 80 | Jack Tabb III | Fr |
| WR | 6 | Sean Tapley | RFr |
| WR | 5 | T.J. Thorpe | Fr |
| G | 78 | Landon Turner | Fr |
| WR | 81 | Reggie Wilkins | RFr |
| OT | 73 | Brennan Williams | Jr |
| QB | 12 | Marquise Williams | Fr |
| TE | 33 | Christian Wilson | Sr |

Defense

| Pos. | # | Name | Class |
|---|---|---|---|
| DE | 86 | Tyler Alberts | Fr |
| S | 10 | Tre Boston | So |
| LB | 45 | Josh Bridges | Jr |
| CB | 12 | Charles Brown | Sr |
| DL | 74 | Devonte Brown | So |
| LB | 47 | Zach Brown | Sr |
| S | 36 | D.J. Bunn | So |
| LB | 43 | Curtis Campbell | So |
| LB | 56 | P.J. Clyburn | RFr |
| DE | 90 | Quinton Coples | Sr |
| DE | 94 | Adam Curry | Jr |
| LB | 49 | Fabby Desir | Jr |
| DB | 16 | Alex Dixon | Fr |
| DB | 20 | Brandon Ellerbe | Fr |
| DT | 96 | Ethan Farmer | RFr |
| S | 29 | Brian Gupton | Sr |
| LB | 57 | Dion Guy | Jr |
| CB | 13 | Todd Harrelson | Jr |
| LB | 9 | Travis Hughes | Fr |
| DB | 34 | Kameron Jackson | Fr |
| DL | 93 | Tim Jackson | So |
| LB | 23 | Darius Lipford | So |
| CB | 31 | Pete Mangum | Jr |
| DE | 95 | Kareem Martin | So |
| S | 25 | Matt Merletti (injured) | Sr |
| DT | 78 | Jordan Nix | Sr |
| LB | 41 | Ebele Okakpu | Sr |
| LB | 52 | Norkeithus Otis | Fr |
| DE | 98 | Donte Paige-Moss | Jr |
| DE | 53 | Alec Petrocelli | RFr |
| DT | 91 | Tydreke Powell | Sr |
| CB | 4 | Jabari Price | So |
| S | 27 | Darien Rankin | Fr |
| LB | 48 | Kevin Reddick | Jr |
| S | 1 | Gene Robinson | Jr |
| DB | 7 | Tim Scott | Fr |
| CB | 24 | Terry Shankle | So |
| DB | 11 | Sam Smiley | Fr |
| S | 28 | Jonathan Smith | Sr |
| DT | 97 | Shawn Underwood | Fr |
| LB | 54 | Keeon Virgile | Fr |
| DT | 92 | Sylvester Williams | Jr |

Special teams

| Pos. | # | Name | Class |
|---|---|---|---|
| PK | 11 | Casey Barth (injured) | Sr |
| P | 30 | C.J. Feagles | So |
| P | 15 | Thomas Hibbard | Fr |
| DS | 61 | Mark House | Sr |
| H | 19 | Trase Jones | Sr |
| DS | 67 | Mack Lloyd | So |
| P/PK | 17 | Miller Snyder | Fr |
| PK | 14 | Thomas Moore | Fr |

Head coach

- Everett Withers (interim)

Coordinators/assistant coaches

- Sam Pittman -Associate head coach/offensive line
- Ken Browning -Running backs
- Troy Douglas -Defensive backs
- Art Kaufman -Linebackers
- Allen Mogridge -Tight ends
- Tom Myslinski -Head strength and conditioning coach
- Joe Robinson -Defensive line
- John Shoop -Offensive coordinator/quarterbacks
- Steve Sisa -Safeties
- Charlie Williams -Wide receivers

Legend

- (C) Team captain
- (S) Suspended
- (I) Ineligible
- Injured
- Redshirt

Roster
Last update: September 7, 2011

== Schedule ==
| Date | Time | Opponent | Site | TV | Result | Attendance | Source |
|---|---|---|---|---|---|---|---|
| September 3 | 3:30 p.m. | No. 15 (FCS) James Madison* | Kenan Memorial Stadium; Chapel Hill, NC | RSN | W 42–10 | 57,000 | |
| September 10 | 12:30 p.m. | Rutgers* | Kenan Memorial Stadium; Chapel Hill, NC | ACCN | W 24–22 | 53,000 | |
| September 17 | 3:30 p.m. | Virginia | Kenan Memorial Stadium; Chapel Hill, NC (South's Oldest Rivalry) | ESPNU | W 28–17 | 55,000 | |
| September 24 | 12:00 p.m. | at No. 25 Georgia Tech | Bobby Dodd Stadium; Atlanta, GA | ESPN | L 28–35 | 46,849 | |
| October 1 | 8:00 p.m. | at East Carolina* | Dowdy–Ficklen Stadium; Greenville, NC | CBSSN | W 35–20 | 50,610 | |
| October 8 | 12:00 p.m. | Louisville* | Kenan Memorial Stadium; Chapel Hill, NC | ESPN2 | W 14–7 | 51,500 | |
| October 15 | 12:30 p.m. | Miami (FL) | Kenan Memorial Stadium; Chapel Hill, NC | ACCN | L 24–30 | 60,000 | |
| October 22 | 12:00 p.m. | at No. 8 Clemson | Memorial Stadium; Clemson, SC | ESPN | L 38–59 | 79,000 | |
| October 29 | 3:30 p.m. | Wake Forest^{†} | Kenan Memorial Stadium; Chapel Hill, NC (rivalry) | ESPNU | W 49–24 | 57,000 | |
| November 5 | 12:30 p.m. | at NC State | Carter–Finley Stadium; Raleigh, NC (rivalry) | ACCN | L 0–13 | 57,583 | |
| November 17 | 8:00 p.m. | at No. 9 Virginia Tech | Lane Stadium/Worsham Field; Blacksburg, VA | ESPN | L 21–24 | 66,233 | |
| November 26 | 3:30 p.m. | Duke | Kenan Memorial Stadium; Chapel Hill, NC (Victory Bell) | RSN | W 37–21 | 58,500 | |
| December 26 | 5:00 p.m. | vs. Missouri* | Independence Stadium; Shreveport, LA (Independence Bowl) | ESPN2 | L 24–41 | 41,728 | |
*Non-conference game; ^{†}Homecoming; Rankings from AP Poll released prior to the game; All times are in Eastern time

== Rankings ==
Ranking movements Legend: ██ Increase in ranking ██ Decrease in ranking — = Not ranked RV = Received votes
| | Week | | | | | | | | | | | | | | | |
| Poll | Pre | 1 | 2 | 3 | 4 | 5 | 6 | 7 | 8 | 9 | 10 | 11 | 12 | 13 | 14 | Final |
|---|---|---|---|---|---|---|---|---|---|---|---|---|---|---|---|---|
| AP | — | — | — | RV | — | — | RV | — | — | — | — | — | — | — | — | — |
| Coaches | RV | RV | RV | 25 | RV | RV | RV | RV | — | RV | — | — | — | — | — | — |
| Harris | Not released | | | | | | RV | RV | — | RV | — | — | — | — | — | Not released |
| BCS | Not released | | | | | | | — | — | — | — | — | — | — | — | Not released |

== Game summaries ==
=== James Madison ===
Week 1: James Madison Dukes

| Quarter | 1 | 2 | 3 | 4 | Total |
|---|---|---|---|---|---|
| Dukes | 0 | 7 | 3 | 0 | 10 |
| Tar Heels | 14 | 14 | 0 | 14 | 42 |

at Kenan Memorial Stadium

- Date: September 3, 2011
- Game time: 3:30 pm
- Game weather: 86 °F (30 °C), sunny
- Game attendance: 57,000
- Referee: Tom Zimorski
- TV announcers (ACC Network): Rich Waltz, Keith Jones, Jenn Hildreth

Game information

First quarter

- UNC – Dwight Jones 34 yd pass from Bryn Renner (Casey Barth kick)
- UNC – Giovani Bernard 12 yd run (Casey Barth kick)

Second quarter

- UNC – Ryan Houston 1 yd run (Casey Barth kick)
- JMU – Daniel Brown 41 yd pass from Justin Thorpe (Cameron Starke kick)
- UNC – Giovani Bernard 14 yd run (Casey Barth kick)

Third quarter

- JMU – Cameron Starke 31 yd field goal

Fourth quarter

- UNC – Bryn Renner 1 yd run (Casey Barth kick)
- UNC – Dwight Jones 21 yd pass from Bryn Renner (Casey Barth kick)

Top Passing

- UNC – Bryn Renner – 22/23, 277 yds, 2 TD, 1 INT
- JMU – Justin Thorpe – 11/15, 152 yds, 1 TD, 0 INT

Top Rushing

- UNC – Giovani Bernard – 64 yds, 2 TD
- JMU – Jordan Anderson – 40 yds, 0 TD

Top Receiving

- UNC – Dwight Jones – 116 yds, 2 TD
- JMU – Brian Barlow – 31 yds, 0 TD

This was the first ever game as a head coach for Everett Withers. The Tar Heels never trailed in the game, scoring on the opening drive of the game with a 34 yard touchdown pass from Bryn Renner to Dwight Jones. The Heels gave up only one touchdown, which came off of the ensuing drive after a mishandled snap, which resulted in a blocked punt. In his first ever collegiate start, Bryn Renner set school and ACC records for the highest completion percentage (95.7%) in a single-game and was just shy of the NCAA record of 95.8% set in 1998 by Tennessee's Tee Martin.

=== Rutgers ===
Week 2: Rutgers Scarlet Knights

| Quarter | 1 | 2 | 3 | 4 | Total |
|---|---|---|---|---|---|
| Scarlet Knights | 0 | 12 | 3 | 7 | 22 |
| Tar Heels | 7 | 10 | 7 | 0 | 24 |

at Kenan Memorial Stadium

- Date: September 10, 2011
- Game time: 12:30 pm
- Game weather: 82 °F (28 °C), mostly sunny
- Game attendance: 53,000
- Referee: Jerry McGinn
- TV announcers (ACC Network): Steve Martin, Dave Archer, Mike Hogewood

Game information

First quarter

- UNC – Dwight Jones 66 yd pass from Bryn Renner (Casey Barth kick)

Second quarter

- RUT – Te, San San 35 yd field goal
- RUT – Te, San San 50 yd field goal
- UNC – Giovani Bernard 60 yd run (Casey Barth kick)
- RUT – Sanu, Mohamed 18 yd pass from Dodd, Chas (Dodd, Chas pass failed)
- UNC – Casey Barth 46 yd field goal

Third quarter

- RUT – Te, San San 19 yd field goal
- UNC – Giovani Bernard 6 yd run (Casey Barth kick)

Fourth quarter

- RUT – Wright, Tim 5 yd pass from Dodd, Chas (Te, San San kick)

Top Passing

- UNC – Bryn Renner – 20–26, 273 yds, 1 TD, 3 INT
- RUT – Chas Dodd – 25–47, 243 yds, 2 TD, 0 INT

Top Rushing

- UNC – Giovani Bernard – 81 yds, 2 TD
- RUT – De'An Williams – 15 yds, 0 TD

Top Receiving

- UNC – Dwight Jones – 135 yds, 1 TD
- RUT – Mohamed Sanu – 119 yds, 1 TD

North Carolina was able to hold on to a 2 point win despite turning the ball over 5 times (2 fumbles and 3 interceptions) and not having a single takeaway. A key defensive stand came in the first quarter when a Rutgers interception was returned to the UNC 2 yard line. The UNC defense was able to hold the Rutgers offense and on 4th down from the 1 yard line held the line of scrimmage forcing a turnover on downs. The UNC defense was also able to hold Rutgers to only 1 yard rushing total for the game, the lowest total since holding Wake Forest to a negative 2 yards in 2000.

=== Virginia ===
Week 3: Virginia Cavaliers

| Quarter | 1 | 2 | 3 | 4 | Total |
|---|---|---|---|---|---|
| Cavaliers | 0 | 3 | 7 | 7 | 17 |
| Tar Heels | 0 | 14 | 14 | 0 | 28 |

at Kenan Memorial Stadium

- Date: September 17, 2011
- Game time: 3:30 pm
- Game weather: 60 °F (16 °C), cloudy
- Game attendance: 55,000
- Referee: Brad Allen
- TV announcers (ESPNU): Pam Ward, Dan Hawkins

Game information

First quarter

- no scoring

Second quarter

- UVA – Robert Randolph 38 yd field goal
- UNC – Jheranie Boyd 18 yd pass from Bryn Renner (Casey Barth kick)
- UNC – Ryan Houston 1 yd run (Casey Barth kick)

Third quarter

- UNC – Dwight Jones 17 yd pass from Bryn Renner (Thomas Moore kick)
- UVA – Max Milien 41 yd pass from Michael Rocco (Robert Randolph kick)
- UNC – Ryan Houston 2 yd run (Thomas Moore kick)

Fourth quarter

- UVA – Michael Rocco 4 yd run (Robert Randolph kick)

Top Passing

- UNC – Bryn Renner – 15–21, 143 yds, 2 TD, 0 INT
- UVA – Michael Rocco – 22–37, 287 yds, 1 TD, 2 INT

Top Rushing

- UNC – Giovani Bernard – 102 yds, 0 TD
- UVA – Kevin Parks – 98 yds, 0 TD

Top Receiving

- UNC – Dwight Jones – 85 yds, 1 TD
- UVA – Kris Burd – 110 yds, 0 TD

With its win against Virginia, UNC started their ACC schedule with a win for the first time since 2001. The Heels were able to effectively run the ball against the Cavaliers, finishing the game with 222 rushing yards by 8 different offensive players. The Heels defense recorded their first takeaways of the young season when Matt Merletti recorded 2 interceptions in the fourth quarter to seal the Carolina victory.

=== Georgia Tech ===
Week 4: Georgia Tech Yellow Jackets

| Quarter | 1 | 2 | 3 | 4 | Total |
|---|---|---|---|---|---|
| #25 Tar Heels | 7 | 0 | 7 | 14 | 28 |
| #24 Yellow Jackets | 3 | 14 | 11 | 7 | 35 |

at Bobby Dodd Stadium

- Date: September 24, 2011
- Game time: 12:00 pm
- Game weather: 72 °F (22 °C), sunny
- Game attendance: 46,849
- Referee: Ron Cherry
- TV announcers (ESPN): Bob Wischusen, Bob Davie

Game information

First quarter

- UNC – Giovani Bernard 4 yd run (Thomas Moore kick)
- GT – Justin Moore 40 yd field goal

Second quarter

- GT – Stephen Hill 59 yd pass from Tevin Washington (Justin Moore kick)
- GT – Roddy Jones 2 yd run (Justin Moore kick)

Third quarter

- GT – Justin Moore 36 yd field goal
- UNC – Nelson Hurst 6 yd pass from Bryn Renner (Thomas Moore kick)
- GT – Tevin Washington 1 yd run (David Sims rush)

Fourth quarter

- UNC – Eric Ebron 20 yd pass from Bryn Renner (Thomas Moore kick)
- UNC – Giovani Bernard 55 yd run (Thomas Moore kick)
- GT – Tevin Washington 5 yd run (Justin Moore kick)

Top Passing

- UNC – Bryn Renner – 17–25, 204 yds, 2 TD, 2 INT
- GT – Tevin Washington – 10–14, 184 yds, 1 TD, 1 INT

Top Rushing

- UNC – Giovani Bernard – 154 yds, 2 TD
- GT – Orwin Smith – 79 yds, 0 TD

Top Receiving

- UNC – Dwight Jones – 85 yds, 0 TD
- GT – Stephen Hill – 151 yds, 1 TD

Georgia Tech entered this meeting of unbeatens as one of the top offenses in the nation averaging 53.3 points and 675.3 yards a game. The UNC defense, however, was able to hold them to only 35 points and 496 yards. Trailing 28–14 in the fourth quarter, UNC rallied behind an Eric Ebron touchdown reception and a 55 yard Giovani Bernard touchdown run to tie the game up with 7:22 left in the game. Georgia Tech took the lead for good with a Tevin Washington touchdown run with 5:20 remaining. With the win, Georgia Tech goes to 4–0 for the first time since their national championship season in 1990.

=== East Carolina ===
Week 5: East Carolina Pirates

| Quarter | 1 | 2 | 3 | 4 | Total |
|---|---|---|---|---|---|
| Tar Heels | 14 | 14 | 0 | 7 | 35 |
| Pirates | 0 | 3 | 10 | 7 | 20 |

at Dowdy–Ficklen Stadium

- Date: October 1, 2011
- Game time: 8:00 pm
- Game weather: 56 °F (13 °C), mostly clear
- Game attendance: 50,610
- Referee: Randy Smith
- TV announcers (CBSSN): James Bates, Aaron Taylor, Brooke Olzendam

Game information

First quarter

- UNC – Jheranie Boyd 11 yd pass from Bryn Renner (Thomas Moore kick)
- UNC – Erik Highsmith 75 yd pass from Bryn Renner (Thomas Moore kick)

Second quarter

- UNC – Giovani Bernard 10 yd run (Thomas Moore kick)
- ECU – Mike Barbour 35 yd field goal
- UNC – Dwight Jones 47 yd pass from Bryn Renner (Thomas Moore kick)

Third quarter

- ECU – Lance Lewis 23 yd pass from Dominique Davis (Mike Barbour kick)
- ECU – Mike Barbour 25 yd field goal

Fourth quarter

- UNC – Dwight Jones 4 yd pass from Bryn Renner (Thomas Moore kick)
- ECU – Danny Webster 4 yd pass from Dominique Davis (Mike Barbour kick)

Top Passing

- UNC – Bryn Renner – 13–20, 230 yds, 4 TD, 0 INT
- ECU – Dominique Davis – 41–58, 417 yds, 2 TD, 2 INT

Top Rushing

- UNC – Giovani Bernard – 146 yds, 1 TD
- ECU – Reggie Bullock – 72 yds, 0 TD

Top Receiving

- UNC – Erik Highsmith – 94 yds, 1 TD
- ECU – Lance Lewis – 166 yds, 1 TD

UNC did not commit a turnover in a game for the first time all season. They were +4 in the turnover margin for the game (2 fumble recoveries and 2 interceptions). Giovani Bernard became the first Tar Heel since Natrone Means in 1992 to rush for over 100 yards in 3 consecutive games. His 7 touchdowns through 5 games ties the individual high for Johnny White as the team leader for the year in 2011. The UNC offense continued to perform in the red-zone scoring touchdowns on 3 of 4 trips, bringing their season total to 15 touchdowns in 18 trips in the redzone. The defense, however, has held opponents to only 7 touchdowns in 18 trips into the redzone so far this year.

=== Louisville ===
Week 6: Louisville Cardinals

| Quarter | 1 | 2 | 3 | 4 | Total |
|---|---|---|---|---|---|
| Cardinals | 0 | 0 | 0 | 7 | 7 |
| Tar Heels | 0 | 0 | 7 | 7 | 14 |

at Kenan Memorial Stadium

- Date: October 8, 2011
- Game time: 12:00 pm
- Game weather: 68 °F (20 °C), sunny
- Game attendance: 51,500
- Referee: Jeff Maconaghy
- TV announcers (ESPN2): Bob Wischusen, Bob Davie

Game information

First quarter

- no scoring

Second quarter

- no scoring

Third quarter

- UNC – Giovani Bernard 3 yd run (Thomas Moore kick)

Fourth quarter

- UNC – Dwight Jones 43 yd pass from Bryn Renner (Thomas Moore kick)
- LOU – Dominique Brown 18 yd pass from Teddy Bridgewater (Chris Philpott kick)

Top Passing

- UNC – Bryn Renner – 12–18, 178 yds, 1 TD, 0 INT
- LOU – Teddy Bridgewater – 19–30, 173 yds, 1 TD, 1 INT

Top Rushing

- UNC – Giovani Bernard – 109 yds, 1 TD
- LOU – Dominique Brown – 47 yds, 0 TD

Top Receiving

- UNC – Dwight Jones – 91 yds, 1 TD
- LOU – Eli Rogers – 56 yds, 0 TD

Despite having the ball for 22:08 in the first half, Louisville only gained 173 yards of offense. This was, however, 113 more yards than UNC going into the locker rooms at the half. In the second half however, UNC outgained Louisville 202 to 95. Louisville's only score of the game came with only 42 seconds left to end the shutout for the UNC defense. Giovani Bernard became the first ever freshman running back to rush for over 100 yards in 4 straight games. With this win, UNC has won 8 straight games against non-conference opponents. Their last lost was against LSU in the Chick-fil-A Kickoff Game.

=== Miami (FL) ===
Week 7: Miami Hurricanes

| Quarter | 1 | 2 | 3 | 4 | Total |
|---|---|---|---|---|---|
| Hurricanes | 17 | 10 | 0 | 3 | 30 |
| Tar Heels | 0 | 10 | 0 | 14 | 24 |

at Kenan Memorial Stadium

- Date: October 15, 2011
- Game time: 12:30 pm
- Game weather: 69 °F (21 °C), sunny
- Game attendance: 60,000
- Referee: Brad Allen
- TV announcers (ACC Network): Steve Martin, Dave Archer, Mike Hogewood

Game information

First quarter

- MIA – Mike James 4 yd pass from Jacory Harris (Jake Wieclaw kick)
- MIA – Tommy Streeter 27 yd pass from Jacory Harris (Jake Wieclaw kick)
- MIA – Jake Wieclaw 41 yd field goal

Second quarter

- UNC – Thomas Moore 20 yd field goal
- MIA – Jake Wieclaw 43 yd field goal
- MIA – Travis Benjamin 30 yd pass from Jacory Harris (Jake Wieclaw kick)
- UNC – Dwight Jones 4 yd pass from Bryn Renner (Thomas Moore kick)

Third quarter

- no scoring

Fourth quarter

- UNC – Giovani Bernard 3 yd run (Thomas Moore kick)
- MIA – Jake Wieclaw 28 yd field goal
- UNC – Reggie Wilkins 20 yd pass from Bryn Renner (Thomas Moore kick)

Top Passing

- UNC – Bryn Renner – 29–37, 288 yds, 2 TD, 0 INT
- MIA – Jacory Harris – 20–30, 267 yds, 3 TD, 0 INT

Top Rushing

- UNC – Giovani Bernard – 110 yds, 1 TD
- MIA – Lamar Miller – 29 yds, 0 TD

Top Receiving

- UNC – Dwight Jones – 82 yds, 1 TD
- MIA – Travis Benjamin – 99 yds, 1 TD

UNC gave up a touchdown in the first quarter for the first time this season. Miami took a 14–0 lead before UNC ever took the field on offense. Miami scored on their opening drive of the game and then, on the ensuing kick-off, recovered a fumble by kick returner T.J. Thorpe and scored on their next play from scrimmage. The Heels nearly made an improbable comeback when, down by 13, they scored a touchdown with 46 seconds remaining in the game. They then recovered the on-side kick on their own 44 yard line. They were able to advance the ball to the 30 yard line after a 15 yard pass reception by Dwight Jones and an 11 yard reception by Giovani Bernard. Bernard also rushed for another 110 yards giving him 5 100+ yard games in a row. This ties for the second most in a season by a UNC freshman. The other two UNC freshmen with this record are Amos Lawrence (who finished with 6 in 1977) and Leon Johnson (who finished with 5 in 1993).

=== Clemson ===
Week 8: Clemson Tigers

| Quarter | 1 | 2 | 3 | 4 | Total |
|---|---|---|---|---|---|
| Tar Heels | 7 | 10 | 7 | 14 | 38 |
| #8 Tigers | 10 | 14 | 35 | 0 | 59 |

at Memorial Stadium

- Date: October 22, 2011
- Game time: 12:00 pm
- Game weather: 62 °F (17 °C), sunny
- Game attendance: 79,000
- Referee: Gary Patterson
- TV announcers (ESPN): Dave Pasch, Chris Spielman, Urban Meyer, Quint Kessenich

Game information

First quarter

- CLEM – Chandler Catanzaro 39 yd field goal
- UNC – Jheranie Boyd 33 yd pass from Bryn Renner (Thomas Moore kick)
- CLEM – DeAndre Hopkins 25 yd pass from Tajh Boyd (Chandler Catanzaro kick)

Second quarter

- UNC – Thomas Moore 32 yd field goal
- CLEM – Martavis Bryant 29 yd pass from Tajh Boyd (Chandler Catanzaro kick)
- CLEM – Kourtnei Brown 20 yd interception return (Chandler Catanzaro kick)
- UNC – Jheranie Boyd 58 yd pass from Bryn Renner (Thomas Moore kick)

Third quarter

- CLEM – Tajh Boyd 1 yd run (Chandler Catanzaro kick)
- CLEM – Brandon Ford 12 yd pass from Tajh Boyd (Chandler Catanzaro kick)
- UNC – T.J. Thorpe 100 yd kickoff return (Thomas Moore kick)
- CLEM – Sammy Watkins 42 yd pass from Tajh Boyd (Chandler Catanzaro kick)
- CLEM – Dwayne Allen 9 yd pass from Tajh Boyd (Chandler Catanzaro kick)
- CLEM – Kourtnei Brown 26 yd fumble recovery (Chandler Catanzaro kick)

Fourth quarter

- UNC – Ryan Houston 2 yd run (Thomas Moore kick)
- UNC – Ryan Houston 12 yd run (Thomas Moore kick)

Top Passing

- UNC – Bryn Renner – 19–33, 264 yds, 2 TD, 3 INT
- CLEM – Tajh Boyd – 27–46, 367 yds, 5 TD, 0 INT

Top Rushing

- UNC – Ryan Houston – 63 yds, 2 TD
- CLEM – D.J. Howard – 25 yds, 0 TD

Top Receiving

- UNC – Jheranie Boyd – 95 yds, 2 TD
- CLEM – DeAndre Hopkins – 157 yds, 1 TD

The Tar Heels turned the ball over 6 times in their 59–38 loss to Clemson. This was the most points allowed by UNC since they gave up 69 to Louisville in 2005. UNC was only down by 7 going into the half and their defense had only allowed 15 yards of rushing up to that point. However, Clemson's 35 points in the third quarter became only the second time in school history to accomplish this feat, the only other time being by the 1981 National Championship team. T.J. Thorpe became only the second Tar Heel in history to record a kickoff return of 100 yards for a touchdown.

=== Wake Forest ===
Week 9: Wake Forest Demon Deacons

| Quarter | 1 | 2 | 3 | 4 | Total |
|---|---|---|---|---|---|
| Demon Deacons | 0 | 10 | 7 | 7 | 24 |
| Tar Heels | 14 | 7 | 7 | 21 | 49 |

at Kenan Memorial Stadium

- Date: October 29, 2011
- Game time: 3:30 pm
- Game weather: 52 °F (11 °C), partly sunny
- Game attendance: 57,000
- Referee: David Epperley
- TV announcers (ESPNU): Pam Ward, Dan Hawkins

Game information

First quarter

- UNC – Giovani Bernard 7 yd pass from Bryn Renner (Thomas Moore kick)
- UNC – Erik Highsmith 4 yd pass from Bryn Renner (Thomas Moore kick)

Second quarter

- WF – Brandon Pendergrass 8 yd run (Jimmy Newman kick)
- WF – Jimmy Newman 22 yd field goal
- UNC – Giovani Bernard 4 yd run (Thomas Moore kick)

Third quarter

- WF – Brandon Pendergrass 30 yd run (Jimmy Newman kick)
- UNC – Ryan Houston 1 yd run (Thomas Moore kick)

Fourth quarter

- UNC – Giovani Bernard 4 yd run (Thomas Moore kick)
- UNC – Erik Highsmith 38 yd pass from Bryn Renner (Thomas Moore kick)
- UNC – A.J. Blue 5 yd run (Thomas Moore kick)
- WF – Tommy Bohanon 3 yd run (Jimmy Newman kick)

Top Passing

- UNC – Bryn Renner – 21–28, 338 yds, 3 TD, 0 INT
- WF – Tanner Price – 17–29, 146 yds, 0 TD, 3 INT

Top Rushing

- UNC – Giovani Bernard – 163 yds, 2 TD
- WF – Brandon Pendergrass – 105 yds, 2 TD

Top Receiving

- UNC – Dwight Jones – 138 yds, 0 TD
- WF – Michael Campanaro – 88 yds, 0 TD

With their win over Wake Forest, North Carolina became bowl eligible for the 4th straight year. The Tar Heel defense caused 5 Deacon turnovers (3 interceptions and 2 fumbles) after Wake Forest had committed only 5 turnovers the entire season coming into the game. UNC's 49 points was the most they had scored in a game since their opener against William & Mary in 2004 and the most against an ACC opponent since the 2001 season. The Tar Heel defense was led by senior Zach Brown who had 9 tackles (2.5 for a loss), an interception, a sack, a forced fumble, and a fumble recovery.

=== NC State ===
Week 10: NC State Wolfpack

| Quarter | 1 | 2 | 3 | 4 | Total |
|---|---|---|---|---|---|
| Tar Heels | 0 | 0 | 0 | 0 | 0 |
| Wolfpack | 7 | 3 | 3 | 0 | 13 |

at Carter–Finley Stadium

- Date: November 5, 2011
- Game time: 12:30 pm
- Game weather: 46 °F (8 °C), mostly sunny, windy
- Game attendance: 57,583
- Referee: Tom Zimorski
- TV announcers (ACC Network): Steve Martin, Dave Archer, Scott Pryzwansky

Game information

First quarter

- NCSU – T.J. Graham 12 yd pass from Mike Glennon (Niklas Sade kick)

Second quarter

- NCSU – Niklas Sade 26 yd field goal

Third quarter

- NCSU – Niklas Sade 24 yd field goal

Fourth quarter

- no scoring

Top Passing

- UNC – Braden Hanson – 7–13, 86 yds, 0 TD, 1 INT
- NCSU – Mike Glennon – 16–33, 164 yds, 1 TD, 1 INT

Top Rushing

- UNC – Giovani Bernard – 47 yds, 0 TD
- NCSU – James Washington – 110 yds, 0 TD

Top Receiving

- UNC – Dwight Jones – 72 yds, 0 TD
- NCSU – Tobais Palmer – 94 yds, 0 TD

The Tar Heels were shut out for the first time since a 7–0 loss to Georgia Tech in 2006, and their first shut out by NC State since 1960. Bryn Renner was knocked out of the game with concussion-like symptoms early in the second half. The UNC offense had its worst performance of the season, being held to a game low of 165 total yards. Giovani Bernard was, however, able to become the 15th Tar Heel to rush for 1,000 yards in a season and the third freshman to rush for 1,000 yards. The only point in the game in which it seemed UNC was going to put points on the scoreboard was on a 75 yard touchdown reception by Dwight Jones that was called back because of holding on the offensive line.

=== Virginia Tech ===
Week 11: Virginia Tech Hokies

| Quarter | 1 | 2 | 3 | 4 | Total |
|---|---|---|---|---|---|
| Tar Heels | 7 | 0 | 0 | 14 | 21 |
| #9 Hokies | 0 | 10 | 14 | 0 | 24 |

at Lane Stadium

- Date: November 17, 2011
- Game time: 8:00 pm
- Game weather: 33 °F (1 °C), clear
- Game attendance: 66,233
- Referee: Ron Cherry
- TV announcers (ESPN): Rece Davis, Jesse Palmer, Craig James, Jenn Brown

Game information

First quarter

- UNC – Giovani Bernard 4 yd run (Thomas Moore kick)

Second quarter

- VT – Chris Drager 11 yd pass from Logan Thomas (Cody Journell kick)
- VT – Cody Journell 22 yd field goal

Third quarter

- VT – Logan Thomas 23 yd run (Cody Journell kick)
- VT – D.J. Coles 4 yd pass from Logan Thomas (Cody Journell kick)

Fourth quarter

- UNC – Erik Highsmith 5 yd pass from Bryn Renner (Thomas Moore kick)
- UNC – Ryan Houston 1 yd run (Thomas Moore kick)

Top Passing

- UNC – Bryn Renner – 14–26, 224 yds, 1 TD, 0 INT
- VT – Logan Thomas – 19–32, 195 yds, 2 TD, 0 INT

Top Rushing

- UNC – Giovani Bernard – 45 yds, 1 TD
- VT – David Wilson – 82 yds, 0 TD

Top Receiving

- UNC – Dwight Jones – 105 yds, 0 TD
- VT – Jarrett Boykin – 106 yds, 0 TD

Virginia Tech's Logan Thomas fumbled on the first play from scrimmage when he was sacked by Sylvester Williams. This set up UNC with a 3 play, 20 yard drive that concluded with a Giovani Bernard 4 yard touchdown. After preventing Virginia Tech from converting a 4th down on the UNC 26 yard line, the Heels drove the length of the field to the 5 yard line where Ryan Houston fumbled the ball and it was recovered by the Hokies. The last time that UNC and Virginia Tech played on Thursday night was in 2009 when Virginia Tech fumbled the ball on a drive in the fourth quarter that eventually lead to a UNC victory. After coming 5 yards from taking a 14-0 lead, UNC found itself giving up 24 unanswered points to the Hokies by the fourth quarter. However, with 7:06 left in the game, Bryn Renner completed a pass to Erik Highsmith to reduce the lead to 10 points. After forcing the Hokies to punt on their next possession, Renner completed a 25 yard pass to Dwight Jones, then a 64 yard pass to Erik Highsmith to the 2 yard line where Houston punched the ball into the endzone to cut the lead to 3 with 2:32 left in the game. The Heels recovered the onside kick on the subsequent kick-off, but upon further review, it was judged that the ball did not travel the required 10 yards on the kickoff which gave the Hokies the ball. They were able to run the clock down to where only one play would be left for UNC, who was not able to convert it into a touchdown.

=== Duke ===
Week 12: Duke Blue Devils

| Quarter | 1 | 2 | 3 | 4 | Total |
|---|---|---|---|---|---|
| Blue Devils | 7 | 7 | 7 | 0 | 21 |
| Tar Heels | 10 | 10 | 10 | 7 | 37 |

at Kenan Memorial Stadium

- Date: November 26, 2011
- Game time: 3:30 pm
- Game weather: 68 °F (20 °C), sunny
- Game attendance: 58,500
- Referee: Jeff Flanagan
- TV announcers (ACC Network): Rich Waltz, Keith Jones, Jenn Hildreth

Game information

First quarter

- UNC – Dwight Jones 6 yd pass from Bryn Renner (Thomas Moore kick)
- DUKE – Juwan Thompson 70 yd pass from Sean Renfree (Will Snyderwine kick)
- UNC – Thomas Moore 31 yd field goal

Second quarter

- UNC – Thomas Moore 46 yd field goal
- UNC – Giovani Bernard 48 yd run (Thomas Moore kick)
- DUKE – Jamison Crowder 45 yd pass from Sean Renfree (Will Snyderwine kick)

Third quarter

- UNC – Thomas Moore 28 yd field goal
- DUKE – Donovan Varner 11 yd pass from Anthony Boone (Will Snyderwine kick)
- UNC – Dwight Jones 18 yd pass from Bryn Renner (Thomas Moore kick)

Fourth quarter

- UNC – Dwight Jones 8 yd pass from Bryn Renner (Thomas Moore kick)

Top Passing

- UNC – Bryn Renner – 21–34, 274 yds, 3 TD, 1 INT
- DUKE – Sean Renfree – 13–20, 153 yds, 2 TD, 1 INT

Top Rushing

- UNC – Giovani Bernard – 165 yds, 1 TD
- DUKE – Anthony Boone – 41 yds, 0 TD

Top Receiving

- UNC – Dwight Jones – 101 yds, 3 TD
- DUKE – Juwan Thompson – 70 yds, 1 TD

UNC beat Duke for an 8th straight year, the last loss coming in 2003. Dwight Jones broke the single season reception record with 79 receptions for the season. The previous record of 74 receptions was held by Hakeem Nicks. Bryn Renner tied the single season record for most passing touchdowns with 23. In addition, Giovani Bernard ran for a season high 165 rushing yards. Duke quarterback, Sean Renfree, was taken out of the game during the third quarter due to numbness and swelling in his right hand. Because of this, Anthony Boone saw the most snaps of his freshman year and lead the Blue Devils in rushing for the game.

=== Missouri–Independence Bowl ===
Bowl: Missouri Tigers

| Quarter | 1 | 2 | 3 | 4 | Total |
|---|---|---|---|---|---|
| Tigers | 14 | 17 | 7 | 3 | 41 |
| Tar Heels | 7 | 3 | 7 | 7 | 24 |

at Independence Stadium

- Date: December 26, 2011
- Game time: 5:00 pm
- Game weather: 46 °F (8 °C), 10% chance rain
- Game attendance: 41,728
- Referee: Dan Capron
- TV announcers (ESPN2/SportsUSA Radio): Rob Stone, Danny Kanell, Allison Williams/Rich Cellini, Charles Arbuckle

Game information

First quarter

- UNC – Dwight Jones 22 yd pass from Bryn Renner (Thomas Moore kick)
- MIZZ – Wes Kemp 40 yd pass from T.J. Moe (Trey Barrow kick)
- MIZZ – James Franklin 2 yd run (Trey Barrow kick)

Second quarter

- MIZZ – Trey Barrow 31 yd field goal
- MIZZ – Jerrel Jackson 8 yd pass from James Franklin (Trey Barrow kick)
- MIZZ – Kendi Lawrence 9 yd run (Trey Barrow kick)
- UNC – Thomas Moore 21 yd field goal

Third quarter

- UNC – Jheranie Boyd 44 yd pass from Bryn Renner (Thomas Moore kick)
- MIZZ – James Franklin 2 yd run (Trey Barrow kick)

Fourth quarter

- MIZZ – Trey Barrow 26 yd field goal
- UNC – Erik Highsmith 17 yd pass from Bryn Renner (Thomas Moore kick)

Top Passing

- UNC – Bryn Renner – 27–42, 317 yds, 3 TD, 1 INT
- MIZZ – James Franklin – 15–23, 132 yds, 1 TD, 1 INT

Top Rushing

- UNC – Giovani Bernard – 39 yds, 0 TD
- MIZZ – James Franklin – 142 yds, 2 TD

Top Receiving

- UNC – Erik Highsmith – 77 yds, 1 TD
- MIZZ – Wes Kemp – 48 yds, 1 TD

== NFL draft ==
| Round | Pick | Player | Position | NFL Team |
| 1 | 16 | Quinton Coples | DE | New York Jets |
| 2 | 52 | Zach Brown | OLB | Tennessee Titans |
