= 2011 Missouri Tigers football team =

American college football season

2011 Missouri Tigers football

Independence Bowl champion

Independence Bowl, W 41–24 vs. North Carolina
- Conference: Big 12 Conference
- Record: 8–5 (5–4 Big 12)
- Head coach: Gary Pinkel (11th season)
- Offensive coordinator: David Yost (3rd season)
- Offensive scheme: Spread
- Defensive coordinator: Dave Steckel (3rd season)
- Base defense: 4–3
- Captains: Michael Egnew; Elvis Fisher; Kenji Jackson; Jacquies Smith; Jerrell Jackson
- Home stadium: Faurot Field

2011 Big 12 Conference football standings
	Conf.			Overall
Team	W		L	W		L
No. 3 Oklahoma State $	8	–	1	12	–	1
No. 15 Kansas State	7	–	2	10	–	3
No. 13 Baylor	6	–	3	10	–	3
No. 16 Oklahoma	6	–	3	10	–	3
Missouri	5	–	4	8	–	5
Texas	4	–	5	8	–	5
Texas A&M	4	–	5	7	–	6
Iowa State	3	–	6	6	–	7
Texas Tech	2	–	7	5	–	7
Kansas	0	–	9	2	–	10
$ – BCS representative as conference champion; Rankings from AP Poll

The 2011 Missouri Tigers football team represented the University of Missouri in the 2011 NCAA Division I FBS football season. The team was coached by Gary Pinkel, who returned for his 11th season, and played their home games at Faurot Field at Memorial Stadium. It was the Tigers' final season in the Big 12 Conference as they departed for the Southeastern Conference in 2012. They finished the season 8–5, 5–4 in Big 12 play to finish in fifth place. They were invited to the Independence Bowl where they defeated North Carolina 41–24.

The NCAA recognized Missouri's football program for ranking in the top 10% of the country for Academic Progress Rate for the 2011–12 academic year, MU's final year as members of the Big 12.

== Recruits ==
Key Losses:

- QB Blaine Gabbert
- WR Forrest Shock
- TB Matt Davis
- QB Daryus Allen
- C Tim Barnes
- OL Kirk Lakebrink
- OL LeeRoy Mitchell
- DE Aldon Smith
- S Jarrell Harrison
- DL Bart Coslet
- LB Andrew Gachkar
- LB Jeff Gettys
- DB Munir Prince
- DB Carl Gettis
- DB Kevin Rutland
- DB Tony Buhr
- P Matt Grabner

QB Blaine Gabbert chose to forgo his senior year eligibility and enter the NFL draft in 2011.

Four days after Gabbert declared for the NFL draft, sophomore DE Aldon Smith also declared.

Sheldon Richardson, a 6' 4" defensive tackle originally from St. Louis, signed a Letter of Intent to play for the Tigers in 2011. He was ranked as the #1 DT prospect in the nation from many recruiting analysts, and a 5* rating (out of 5). He also was ranked as the #1 player at any position in the State of Missouri. He originally signed with Mizzou in February 2009, but had to go to junior college (College of the Sequoias, in Visalia, California) to improve his grades; played DT for them in the past two years. He was also rated the #3 junior college prospect by Rivals.com. He also can play offensive tight end as well as defensive tackle.

Michael Boddie, Gerrand Johnson, and Wesley Leftwich signed LOI prior to Feb. 3 and enrolled in classes this Spring semester. 'More Info'

All 17 recruits signed their National Letter of Intent during the National Signing Period (February 3, 2011 – April 1, 2011).

The recruits signed by February 2.

Fully one-half (9) of the 17 recruits are from Texas, and four were in Missouri; two of those four were from St. Louis. The Mizzou class consists of four offensive linemen, four defensive backs, three linebackers, two wide receivers, two defensive tackles, a defensive end, and a quarterback. Richardson is the only junior college transfer.

A capsule look at Mizzou's signees here.

College recruiting (2011)
Name	Hometown	School	Height	Weight	40^{‡}	Commit date
Corbin Berkstresser; QB	Lee's Summit, Missouri	Lee's Summit HS	6 ft 4 in (1.93 m)	220 lb (100 kg)	?	Sep 1, 2009
Corbin Berkstresser; QB	Recruit ratings: Scout: Rivals: (77)					
Michael Boddie; OG	Gilmer, Texas	Gilmer HS	6 ft 6 in (1.98 m)	270 lb (120 kg)	?	Oct 26, 2010
Michael Boddie; OG	Recruit ratings: Scout: Rivals: (77)					
Kentrell Brothers; OLB	Guthrie, Oklahoma	Guthrie HS	6 ft 1 in (1.85 m)	215 lb (98 kg)	4.75	Nov 10, 2010
Kentrell Brothers; OLB	Recruit ratings: Scout: Rivals: (75)					
Courtland Browning; S	Tyler, Texas	Lee HS	6 ft 2 in (1.88 m)	185 lb (84 kg)	4.48	Mar 19, 2010
Courtland Browning; S	Recruit ratings: Scout: Rivals: (74)					
Taylor Chappell; OG	Canadian, Texas	Canadian HS	6 ft 6 in (1.98 m)	270 lb (120 kg)	5.3	May 22, 2010
Taylor Chappell; OG	Recruit ratings: Scout: Rivals: (75)					
Brandon Durant; OLB	Copperas Cove, Texas	Copperas Cove HS	6 ft 1 in (1.85 m)	205 lb (93 kg)	4.6	Nov 4, 2010
Brandon Durant; OLB	Recruit ratings: Scout: Rivals: (72)					
Clarence Green; OLB	Freeport, Texas	Brazoswood HS	6 ft 0 in (1.83 m)	195 lb (88 kg)	4.52	Apr 23, 2010
Clarence Green; OLB	Recruit ratings: Scout: Rivals: (75)					
Brandon Hannah; WR	St. Louis, Missouri	Chaminade College Prep	6 ft 3 in (1.91 m)	215 lb (98 kg)	4.5	Mar 11, 2010
Brandon Hannah; WR	Recruit ratings: Scout: Rivals: (45)					
David Johnson; CB	Spring, Texas	Spring HS	6 ft 0 in (1.83 m)	180 lb (82 kg)	4.37	Dec 18, 2010
David Johnson; CB	Recruit ratings: Scout: Rivals: (45)					
Gerrand Johnson; DT	Rayville, Louisiana	Rayville HS	6 ft 2 in (1.88 m)	270 lb (120 kg)	?	Oct 13, 2010
Gerrand Johnson; DT	Recruit ratings: Scout: Rivals: (78)					
Wesley Leftwich; WR/CB	Columbia, Missouri	Columbia-Hickman HS	6 ft 2 in (1.88 m)	195 lb (88 kg)	4.40	Feb 2, 2010
Wesley Leftwich; WR/CB	Recruit ratings: Scout: Rivals: (75)					
Connor McGovern; OT	Fargo, North Dakota	Shanley HS	6 ft 4 in (1.93 m)	275 lb (125 kg)	5.12	Aug 13, 2010
Connor McGovern; OT	Recruit ratings: Scout: Rivals: (45)					
Brad McNulty; C/OG	Allen, Texas	Allen HS	6 ft 1.5 in (1.87 m)	275 lb (125 kg)	5.41	Oct 12, 2010
Brad McNulty; C/OG	Recruit ratings: Scout: Rivals: (74)					
Ernest Payton; CB	College Station, Texas	A & M Consolidated HS	6 ft 3 in (1.91 m)	195 lb (88 kg)	4.40	Jan 29, 2011
Ernest Payton; CB	Recruit ratings: Scout: Rivals: (45)					
Shane Ray; DE	Shawnee Mission, Kansas	Bishop Miege HS	6 ft 3.5 in (1.92 m)	225 lb (102 kg)	4.75	Mar 6, 2010
Shane Ray; DE	Recruit ratings: Scout: Rivals: (78)					
Sheldon Richardson; DT	St. Louis, Missouri	College of the Sequoias	6 ft 4 in (1.93 m)	270 lb (120 kg)	?	Dec 15, 2010
Sheldon Richardson; DT	Recruit ratings: Scout: Rivals: (81)					
Ian Simon; S	Mansfield, Texas	Mansfield Legacy HS	6 ft 0 in (1.83 m)	175 lb (79 kg)	?	Jun 13, 2010
Ian Simon; S	Recruit ratings: Scout: Rivals: (45)					
Overall recruit ranking: Scout: 47 Rivals: 46 ESPN: 66
‡ Refers to 40-yard dash; Note: In many cases, Scout, Rivals, 247Sports, On3, and ESPN may conflict in their listings of height, weight and 40 time.; In these cases, the average was taken. ESPN grades are on a 100-point scale.; Sources: "Missouri 2011 Football Commitments". Rivals.; "2011 Missouri Commits". Scout.; "2011 Player Commitments – Missouri". ESPN.; "Scout.com Team Recruiting Rankings". Scout.; "2011 Team Ranking". Rivals.com.

== Schedule ==
Date	Time	Opponent	Rank	Site	TV	Result	Attendance	Source
September 3	11:00 am	Miami (OH)*	No. 21	Faurot Field; Columbia, MO	FSN	W 17–6	58,313	
September 9	9:30 pm	at Arizona State*	No. 21	Sun Devil Stadium; Tempe, AZ	ESPN	L 30–37 ^{OT}	70,236	
September 17	6:00 pm	Western Illinois*		Faurot Field; Columbia, MO	FSN PPV	W 69–0	63,420	
September 24	7:00 pm	at No. 1 Oklahoma		Gaylord Family Oklahoma Memorial Stadium; Norman, OK (rivalry)	FX	L 28–38	85,547	
October 8	2:30 pm	at No. 20 Kansas State		Bill Snyder Family Football Stadium; Manhattan, KS	ABC/ESPN3	L 17–24	48,435	
October 15	1:00 pm	Iowa State^{†}		Faurot Field; Columbia, MO (Battle for the Telephone Trophy)		W 52–17	71,004	
October 22	11:00 am	No. 6 Oklahoma State		Faurot Field; Columbia, MO	FX	L 24–45	64,202	
October 29	11:00 am	at No. 16 Texas A&M		Kyle Field; College Station, TX	FX	W 38–31 ^{OT}	86,934	
November 5	6:00 pm	at Baylor		Floyd Casey Stadium; Waco, TX	FSN	L 39–42	40,194	
November 12	11:00 am	No. 21 Texas		Faurot Field; Columbia, MO	FX	W 17–5	61,323	
November 19	2:30 pm	Texas Tech		Faurot Field; Columbia, MO	ABC/ESPN3	W 31–27	54,309	
November 26	2:30 pm	vs. Kansas		Arrowhead Stadium; Kansas City, MO (Border War)	FSN	W 24–10	47,059	
December 26	4:00 pm	vs. North Carolina*		Independence Stadium; Shreveport, LA (Independence Bowl)	ESPN2	W 41–24	41,728	
*Non-conference game; ^{†}Homecoming; Rankings from AP Poll released prior to the game; All times are in Central time

== Roster ==
2011 Missouri Tigers football team roster
Players
Coaches
Offense

Pos.	#	Name	Class
QB	1	James Franklin	So
WR	2	L'Damian Washington	So
WR	3	Gahn McGaffie	Jr
RB	4	Kendial Lawrence	Jr
WR	5	Rolandis Woodland	Jr
RB	6	Marcus Murphy	So
QB	7	Kortland Webb	Fr
WR	8	Wes Kemp	Sr
WR	9	Kerwin Stricker	So
QB	12	Jimmy Costello	Sr
QB	13	Corbin Berkstresser	Fr
WR	14	Jaleel Clark	So
WR	16	Brandon Gerau	Sr
QB	16	Ashton Glaser	So
QB	17	Ryan Howerton	So
WR	18	Wesley Leftwich	Fr
RB	20	Henry Josey	So
WR	21	Bud Sasser	Fr
WR	22	Joe Plevel	Jr
RB	24	Greg White	Fr
RB	26	De'Vion Moore	Sr
WR	28	T. J. Moe	Jr
WR	29	Jerrell Jackson	Sr
RB	33	Kellen Wright	Fr
RB	35	Tyler Hunt	Fr
RB	38	Jared Culver	Jr
WR	46	Kyle Peasel	So
OL	50	Steven Mack	Fr
OL	51	Stephen Carberry	Fr
OL	52	Marvin Newman	Sr
OL	53	Travis Ruth	Jr
OL	56	Robert Luce	Fr
OL	59	Kyle Starke	Fr
OL	61	Max Copeland	So
OL	62	Taylor Chappell	Fr
OL	63	Brad McNulty	Fr
OL	65	Mitch Morse	Fr
OL	66	Austin Wuebbels	Sr
OL	67	Michael Boddie	Fr
OL	68	Justin Britt	So
OL	70	Anthony Gatti	Fr
OL	71	Jayson Palmgren	Sr
OL	72	Elvis Fisher	Sr
OL	73	Mark Hill	So
OL	74	Chris Freeman	Fr
OL	75	Jack Meiners	Jr
OL	76	Quinn Brown	Sr
OL	77	Dan Hoch	Sr
OL	78	Nick Demien	Fr
OL	79	John Birdwell	Sr
WR	80	Terry Dennis	Sr
TE	81	Eric Waters	So
TE	82	Michael Egnew	Sr
TE	84	Stephen Drain	Jr
WR	85	Marcus Lucas	So
TE	86	Beau Brinkley	Sr
TE	87	Andrew Jones	Sr
WR	88	Jimmie Hunt	Fr

Defense

Pos.	#	Name	Class
DB	1	Kip Edwards	Jr
DL	3	Jacquies Smith	Sr
DB	4	Daniel Easterly	Fr
DB	5	Cortland Browning	Fr
DB	7	Randy Ponder	So
DB	9	Braylon Webb	Fr
LB	10	Tony Randolph	Sr
DB	11	Ian Simon	Fr
LB	12	Darvin Ruise	Fr
S	13	Jenji Jackson	Sr
LB	15	Donovan Bonner	So
S	17	Mattlast=White	So
DB	19	David Johnson	Fr
DB	21	Trey Hobson	Sr
DB	22	Robert Steeples	Jr
LB	25	Zaviar Gooden	Jr
DB	26	Xavier Smith	Fr
DB	28	Ernst Payton	Fr
S	30	Kenronte Walker	Jr
DB	31	E. J. Gaines	So
LB	32	Will Ebner	Sr
LB	33	Luke Lambert	Sr
DL	34	Sheldon Richardson	Jr
LB	36	Jared Parham	Fr
LB	38	Kentrell Brothers	Fr
LB	39	Brandon Durant	Fr
LB	40	Clarence Green	Fr
LB	41	Daniel Carpenter	So
S	43	Quincy Hamilton	Fr
DB	45	Tyler Davis	So
DL	47	Kony Ealy	Fr
LB	48	Andrew Wilson	So
LB	50	Denzel Martin	So
DL	52	Michael Sam	So
LB	54	Michael Brennan	Fr
DL	55	Brayden Burnett	So
DL	56	Shane Ray	Fr
DL	57	Brad Maidson	Jr
DL	58	Brendan Donaldson	Sr
DL	60	Connor McGovern	Fr
DL	64	Keric Lickerman	Fr
DL	64	Tim Struckhoff	Jr
DL	85	Derrion Thomas	Fr
DL	89	Matt Hoch	Fr
DL	90	Dominique Hamilton	Sr
DL	91	Jimmy Burge	Jr
DL	92	Corey Sudhoff	Sr
DL	93	Terrell Resonno	Sr
DL	94	Marvin Foster	So
DL	96	Lucas Vincent	Fr
DL	99	George White	Jr

Special teams

Pos.	#	Name	Class
K	91	Blake Owens	Fr
P	92	Christian Brinser	Fr
K	95	Grant Ressel	Sr
P/K	97	Trey Barrow	Jr
K	99	Andrew Baggett	Fr

Head coach

- Gary Pinkel

Coordinators/assistant coaches

- David Yost – Offensive coordinator / Quarterbacks
- Andy Hill – Wide receivers
- Brian Jones – Running backs
- Bruce Walker – Offensive line
- Dave Steckel – Defensive coordinator / Assistant head coach / Linebackers
- Craig Kuligowski – Defensive line
- Cornell Ford – Cornerbacks
- Barry Odom – Safeties

Legend

- (C) Team captain
- (S) Suspended
- (I) Ineligible
- Injured
- Redshirt

|}

== Rankings ==
Ranking movements Legend: ██ Increase in ranking ██ Decrease in ranking — = Not ranked RV = Received votes
	Week															
Poll	Pre	1	2	3	4	5	6	7	8	9	10	11	12	13	14	Final
AP	21	21	RV	RV	RV	—	—	—	—	—	—	—	—	RV	RV	RV
Coaches	21	19	RV	RV	—	—	—	—	—	RV	—	RV	RV	RV	RV	RV
Harris	Not released						—	RV	—	—	—	RV	RV	RV	RV	Not released
BCS	Not released							—	—	—	—	—	—	25	—	Not released

== Game summaries ==
=== Miami (OH) ===
	1	2	3	4	Total
Miami (OH)	0	0	6	0	6
Missouri	7	3	0	7	17

Scoring summary

Quarter	Time	Drive			Team	Scoring information	Score	
Quarter	Time	Plays	Yards	TOP	Team	Scoring information	Miami (OH)	Missouri
1	4:23	11	76	4:12	Missouri	James Franklin 5-yard touchdown run, Grant Ressel kick good	0	7
2	5:59	7	35	2:30	Missouri	38-yard field goal by Grant Ressel	0	10
3	7:55	3	14	1:09	Miami (OH)	Erik Finklea 10-yard touchdown run, Mason Krysinki kick no good	6	10
4	14:55	5	42	1:11	Missouri	Marcus Lucas 10-yard touchdown reception from James Franklin, Grant Ressel kick good	6	17
"TOP" = time of possession. For other American football terms, see Glossary of American football.							6	17

=== @ Arizona State ===
	1	2	3	4	OT	Total
Missouri	3	7	6	14	0	30
Arizona State	7	9	7	7	7	37

Scoring summary

Quarter	Time	Drive			Team	Scoring information	Score	
Quarter	Time	Plays	Yards	TOP	Team	Scoring information	Missouri	Arizona State
1	8:14	5	77	2:04	Arizona State	Jamal Miles 12-yard touchdown reception from Brock Osweiler, Alex Garoutte kick good	0	7
1	3:45	9	64	4:29	Missouri	24-yard field goal by Grant Ressel	3	7
2	13:38	11	41	5:07	Arizona State	47-yard field goal by Alex Garoutte	3	10
2	7:48	12	70	5:50	Missouri	James Franklin 2-yard touchdown run, Grant Ressel kick good	10	10
2	7:31	1	60	0:17	Arizona State	Aaron Pflugrad 60-yard touchdown reception from Brock Osweiler, Alex Garoutte kick no good (blocked)	10	16
3	11:36	7	41	3:24	Missouri	47-yard field goal by Grant Ressel	13	16
3	6:42	9	89	2:54	Missouri	19-yard field goal by Grant Ressel	16	16
3	4:07	6	65	2:35	Arizona State	Aaron Pflugrad 35-yard touchdown reception from Jamal Miles, Alex Garoutte kick good	16	23
4	14:23	7	60	3:30	Arizona State	Brock Osweiler 12-yard touchdown run, Alex Garoutte kick good	16	30
4	12:00	3	32	0:44	Missouri	L'Damian Washington 25-yard touchdown reception from James Franklin, Grant Ressel kick good	23	30
4	2:50	11	59	5:29	Missouri	Michael Egnew 5-yard touchdown reception from James Franklin, Grant Ressel kick good	30	30
OT	0:00	5	25	0:00	Arizona State	Jamal Miles 11-yard touchdown run, Alex Garoutte kick good	30	37
"TOP" = time of possession. For other American football terms, see Glossary of American football.							30	37

=== Western Illinois ===
	1	2	3	4	Total
Western Illinois	0	0	0	0	0
Missouri	21	21	10	17	69

Scoring summary

Quarter	Time	Drive			Team	Scoring information	Score	
Quarter	Time	Plays	Yards	TOP	Team	Scoring information	Western Illinois	Missouri
1	11:32	4	44	2:35	Missouri	Wes Kemp 37-yard touchdown reception from James Franklin, Grant Ressel kick good	0	7
1	6:51	8	83	2:21	Missouri	Henry Josey 6-yard touchdown run, Grant Ressel kick good	0	14
1	2:45	6	73	1:52	Missouri	Henry Josey 21-yard touchdown run, Grant Ressel kick good	0	21
2	9:36	7	69	2:36	Missouri	T.J. Moe 30-yard touchdown reception from James Franklin, Grant Ressel kick good	0	28
2	3:06	7	65	2:13	Missouri	Wes Kemp 10-yard touchdown reception from James Franklin, Grant Ressel kick good	0	35
2	0:52	3	63	0:40	Missouri	Henry Josey 68-yard touchdown run, Grant Ressel kick good	0	42
3	14:21	3	74	0:34	Missouri	James Culver 8-yard touchdown run, Grant Ressel kick good	0	49
3	8:02	11	45	3:54	Missouri	28-yard field goal by Grant Ressel	0	52
4	10:40	8	33	5:26	Missouri	25-yard field goal by Grant Ressel	0	55
4	7:02	4	72	2:07	Missouri	Jimmie Hunt 54-yard touchdown reception from Jimmy Costello, Grant Ressel kick good	0	62
4	4:48	0	44	0:00	Missouri	E.J. Gaines 44-yard punt return for touchdown, Grant Ressel kick good	0	69
"TOP" = time of possession. For other American football terms, see Glossary of American football.							0	69

=== @ Oklahoma ===
	1	2	3	4	Total
Missouri	14	0	0	14	28
Oklahoma	10	14	7	7	38

Scoring summary

Quarter	Time	Drive			Team	Scoring information	Score	
Quarter	Time	Plays	Yards	TOP	Team	Scoring information	Missouri	Oklahoma
1	11:18	7	76	2:07	Missouri	James Franklin 1-yard touchdown run, Grant Ressel kick good	7	0
1	7:07	6	43	2:05	Oklahoma	26-yard field goal by Michael Hunnicutt	7	3
1	6:00	3	76	1:07	Missouri	L'Damian Washington 45-yard touchdown reception from James Franklin, Grant Ressel kick good	14	3
1	4:07	6	80	1:53	Oklahoma	Ryan Broyles 24-yard touchdown reception from Landry Jones, Michael Hunnicutt kick good	14	10
2	6:36	10	80	3:20	Oklahoma	Ryan Broyles 4-yard touchdown reception from Landry Jones, Michael Hunnicutt kick good	14	17
2	4:10	6	70	1:18	Oklahoma	Landry Jones 1-yard touchdown run, Michael Hunnicutt kick good	14	24
3	6:20	9	89	3:20	Oklahoma	Dominique Whaley 3-yard touchdown run, Michael Hunnicutt kick good	14	31
4	6:44	7	89	2:42	Missouri	Henry Josey 48-yard touchdown run, Grant Ressel kick good	21	31
4	3:35	7	62	3:09	Oklahoma	Ryan Broyles 4-yard touchdown reception from Landry Jones, Michael Hunnicutt kick good	21	38
4	0:32	10	73	3:03	Missouri	James Franklin 1-yard touchdown run, Grant Ressel kick good	28	38
"TOP" = time of possession. For other American football terms, see Glossary of American football.							28	38

=== @ Kansas State ===
	1	2	3	4	Total
Missouri	0	3	0	14	17
Kansas State	10	0	7	7	24

Scoring summary

Quarter	Time	Drive			Team	Scoring information	Score	
Quarter	Time	Plays	Yards	TOP	Team	Scoring information	Missouri	Kansas State
1	11:23	6	21	3:24	Kansas State	Collin Klein 2-yard touchdown run, Anthony Cantele kick good	0	7
1	3:19	12	51	6:32	Kansas State	20-yard field goal by Anthony Cantele	0	10
2	9:42	12	58	4:31	Missouri	32-yard field goal by Grant Ressel	3	10
3	5:50	12	80	6:27	Kansas State	Collin Klein 3-yard touchdown run, Anthony Cantele kick good	3	17
4	11:23	7	36	3:37	Kansas State	Collin Klein 1-yard touchdown run, Anthony Cantele kick good	3	24
4	8:12	4	13	1:25	Missouri	Henry Josey 2-yard touchdown run, Grant Ressel kick good	10	24
4	5:02	8	74	1:30	Missouri	James Franklin 1-yard touchdown run, Grant Ressel kick good	17	24
"TOP" = time of possession. For other American football terms, see Glossary of American football.							17	24

=== Iowa State ===
	1	2	3	4	Total
Iowa State	3	7	0	7	17
Missouri	21	10	14	7	52

Scoring summary

Quarter	Time	Drive			Team	Scoring information	Score	
Quarter	Time	Plays	Yards	TOP	Team	Scoring information	Iowa State	Missouri
1	12:03	8	50	2:03	Missouri	James Franklin 1-yard touchdown run, Grant Ressel kick good	0	7
1	9:05	6	38	2:17	Missouri	Henry Josey 1-yard touchdown run, Grant Ressel kick good	0	14
1	4:35	12	64	3:49	Iowa State	26-yard field goal by Zach Guyer	3	14
1	1:33	9	80	3:02	Missouri	Michael Egnew 39-yard touchdown reception from James Franklin, Grant Ressel kick good	3	21
2	11:29	8	71	2:42	Missouri	Kendial Lawrence 2-yard touchdown run, Grant Ressel kick good	3	28
2	10:07	1	78	0:13	Iowa State	A. J. Klein 78-yard interception return for touchdown, Zach Guyer kick good	10	28
2	0:00	8	75	1:39	Missouri	23-yard field goal by Grant Ressel	10	31
3	9:07	9	82	3:34	Missouri	T.J. Moe 7-yard touchdown reception from James Franklin, Grant Ressel kick good	10	38
3	5:01	6	88	2:06	Missouri	James Franklin 1-yard touchdown run, Grant Ressel kick good	10	45
4	14:43	1	6	0:04	Missouri	Wes Kemp 6-yard touchdown reception from James Franklin, Grant Ressel kick good	10	52
4	12:41	6	74	1:57	Iowa State	Jeff Woody 13-yard touchdown run, Zach Guyer kick good	17	52
"TOP" = time of possession. For other American football terms, see Glossary of American football.							17	52

=== Oklahoma State ===
	1	2	3	4	Total
Oklahoma State	14	10	14	7	45
Missouri	3	14	0	7	24

Scoring summary

Quarter	Time	Drive			Team	Scoring information	Score	
Quarter	Time	Plays	Yards	TOP	Team	Scoring information	Oklahoma State	Missouri
1	6:47	9	74	2:41	Oklahoma State	Michael Harrison 27-yard touchdown reception from Brandon Weeden, Quinn Sharp kick good	7	0
1	4:38	7	72	2:09	Missouri	26-yard field goal by Grant Ressel	7	3
1	1:59	10	88	2:39	Oklahoma State	Justin Blackmon 8-yard touchdown reception from Brandon Weeden, Quinn Sharp kick good	14	3
2	14:56	5	48	1:09	Oklahoma State	Joseph Randle 13-yard touchdown reception from Brandon Weeden, Quinn Sharp kick good	21	3
2	9:05	12	78	5:51	Missouri	Kendial Lawrence 18-yard touchdown run, Grant Ressel kick good	21	10
2	6:47	10	54	2:18	Oklahoma State	36-yard field goal by Quinn Sharp	24	10
2	2:03	5	80	1:52	Missouri	T. J. Moe 34-yard touchdown reception from James Franklin, Grant Ressel kick good	24	17
3	9:28	3	27	0:54	Oklahoma State	Joseph Randle 16-yard touchdown run, Quinn Sharp kick good	31	17
3	0:28	3	79	0:58	Oklahoma State	Joseph Randle 59-yard touchdown run, Quinn Sharp kick good	38	17
4	8:04	12	89	3:50	Missouri	James Franklin 3-yard touchdown run, Grant Ressel kick good	38	24
4	0:45	6	74	1:57	Oklahoma State	Joseph Randle 12-yard touchdown run, Quinn Sharp kick good	45	24
"TOP" = time of possession. For other American football terms, see Glossary of American football.							45	24

=== @ Texas A&M ===
	1	2	3	4	OT	Total
Missouri	14	3	0	14	7	38
Texas A&M	7	21	0	3	0	31

Scoring summary

Quarter	Time	Drive			Team	Scoring information	Score	
Quarter	Time	Plays	Yards	TOP	Team	Scoring information	Missouri	Texas A&M
1	7:56	9	56	3:57	Missouri	James Franklin 20-yard touchdown run, Trey Barrow kick good	7	0
1	2:26	14	75	5:30	Texas A&M	Michael Lamothe 2-yard touchdown reception from Ryan Tannehill, Randy Bullock kick good	7	7
1	0:02	8	81	2:24	Missouri	Eric Waters 42-yard touchdown reception from James Franklin, Trey Barrow kick good	14	7
2	11:07	11	74	3:54	Texas A&M	Cyrus Gray 12-yard touchdown reception from Ryan Tannehill, Randy Bullock kick good	14	14
2	9:13	4	41	1:07	Texas A&M	Ryan Swope 6-yard touchdown reception from Ryan Tannehill, Randy Bullock kick good	14	21
2	3:11	11	64	4:42	Texas A&M	Ryan Tannehill 3-yard touchdown run, Randy Bullock kick good	14	28
2	0:00	10	74	3:11	Missouri	26-yard field goal by Trey Barrow	17	28
4	10:50	3	30	0:42	Missouri	James Franklin 8-yard touchdown run, Trey Barrow kick good	24	28
4	7:38	6	79	2:05	Missouri	Henry Josey 11-yard touchdown run, Trey Barrow kick good	31	28
4	4:10	11	56	3:28	Texas A&M	35-yard field goal by Randy Bullock	31	31
OT	0:00	5	25	0:00	Missouri	Marcus Lucas 11-yard touchdown reception from James Franklin, Trey Barrow kick good	38	31
"TOP" = time of possession. For other American football terms, see Glossary of American football.							38	31

=== @ Baylor ===
	1	2	3	4	Total
Missouri	7	7	0	25	39
Baylor	0	13	15	14	42

Scoring summary

Quarter	Time	Drive			Team	Scoring information	Score	
Quarter	Time	Plays	Yards	TOP	Team	Scoring information	Missouri	Baylor
1	8:04	10	62	3:07	Missouri	Henry Josey 6-yard touchdown run, Trey Barrow kick good	7	0
2	12:33	12	68	4:11	Baylor	Terrance Williams 6-yard touchdown reception from Robert Griffin III, Aaron Jones kick good	7	7
2	3:38	8	80	2:26	Missouri	Henry Josey 2-yard touchdown run, Trey Barrow kick good	14	7
2	0:01	14	80	3:37	Baylor	Robert Griffin III 1-yard touchdown run, Aaron Jones kick blocked	14	13
3	13:12	4	73	1:48	Baylor	Terrance Williams 28-yard touchdown reception from Robert Griffin III, 2-point run good	14	21
3	1:28	2	51	0:26	Baylor	Terrance Ganaway 38-yard touchdown run, Aaron Jones kick good	14	28
4	13:46	8	46	2:38	Missouri	30-yard field goal by Trey Barrow	17	28
4	8:22	4	82	1:36	Baylor	Tevin Reese 68-yard touchdown reception from Robert Griffin III, Aaron Jones kick good	17	35
4	7:05	5	67	1:17	Missouri	Marcus Lucas 24-yard touchdown reception from James Franklin, 2-point run good	25	35
4	6:53	1	80	0:12	Baylor	Terrance Ganaway 80-yard touchdown run, Aaron Jones kick good	25	42
4	3:55	11	80	2:58	Missouri	T. J. Moe 17-yard touchdown reception from James Franklin, Trey Barrow kick good	32	42
4	1:59	7	87	1:34	Missouri	L'Damian Washington 15-yard touchdown reception from James Franklin, Trey Barrow kick good	39	42
"TOP" = time of possession. For other American football terms, see Glossary of American football.							39	42

=== Texas ===
	1	2	3	4	Total
Texas	3	0	2	0	5
Missouri	0	14	3	0	17

Scoring summary

Quarter	Time	Drive			Team	Scoring information	Score	
Quarter	Time	Plays	Yards	TOP	Team	Scoring information	Texas	Missouri
1	8:32	12	78	4:39	Texas	27-yard field goal by Justin Tucker	3	0
2	8:46	9	83	3:19	Missouri	James Franklin 2-yard touchdown run, Trey Barrow kick good	3	7
2	4:43	4	69	1:54	Missouri	Kendial Lawrence 35-yard touchdown run, Trey Barrow kick good	3	14
3	7:15	4	-1	1:28	Missouri	19-yard field goal by Trey Barrow	3	17
3	3:31	6	11	2:05	Texas	Ball through end zone for safety	5	17
"TOP" = time of possession. For other American football terms, see Glossary of American football.							5	17

=== Texas Tech ===
	1	2	3	4	Total
Texas Tech	14	3	10	0	27
Missouri	0	10	7	14	31

Scoring summary

Quarter	Time	Drive			Team	Scoring information	Score	
Quarter	Time	Plays	Yards	TOP	Team	Scoring information	Texas Tech	Missouri
1	10:51	9	57	2:01	Texas Tech	Brad Marquez 1-yard run (Donnie Carona kick)	7	0
1	1:25	13	80	3:57	Texas Tech	Seth Doege 1-yard run (Donnie Carona kick)	14	0
2	4:59	10	90	3:40	Missouri	James Franklin 5-yard run (Trey Barrow kick)	14	7
2	0:27	11	49	4:32	Texas Tech	Donnie Carona 48-yard field goal	17	7
2	0:00	3	36	0:21	Missouri	Trey Barrow 39-yard field goal	17	10
3	9:15	13	63	5:45	Texas Tech	Donnie Carona 33-yard field goal	20	10
3	4:43	9	70	4:28	Missouri	Michael Egnew 5-yard pass from James Franklin (Trey Barrow kick)	20	17
3	0:01	12	77	4:38	Texas Tech	Darrin Moore 24-yard pass from Seth Doege (Donnie Carona kick)	27	17
4	12:03	7	63	2:57	Missouri	Marcus Lucas 7-yard pass from James Franklin (Trey Barrow kick)	27	24
4	2:22	10	89	3:44	Missouri	James Franklin 9-yard run (Trey Barrow kick)	27	31
"TOP" = time of possession. For other American football terms, see Glossary of American football.							27	31

=== Vs. Kansas ===
	1	2	3	4	Total
Kansas	0	10	0	0	10
Missouri	0	3	14	7	24

Scoring summary

Quarter	Time	Drive			Team	Scoring information	Score	
Quarter	Time	Plays	Yards	TOP	Team	Scoring information	Kansas	Missouri
2	12:31	4	-1	1:43	Kansas	33-yard field goal by Ron Doherty	3	0
2	10:36	5	18	1:55	Kansas	Bradley McDougald 57-yard interception return for touchdown (Alex Mueller kick good)	10	0
2	5:15	11	59	5:21	Missouri	23-yard field goal by Trey Barrow	10	3
3	12:44	3	14	0:57	Missouri	Kendial Lawrence 2-yard touchdown run, Trey Barrow kick good	10	10
3	5:34	9	93	3:10	Missouri	Wes Kemp 25-yard touchdown reception from James Franklin, Trey Barrow kick good	10	17
4	14:52	5	82	2:08	Missouri	Marcus Lucas 53-yard touchdown reception from {{{QB}}}, Trey Barrow kick good	10	24
"TOP" = time of possession. For other American football terms, see Glossary of American football.							10	24

=== Vs. North Carolina—Independence Bowl ===
	1	2	3	4	Total
Missouri	14	17	7	3	41
North Carolina	7	3	7	7	24
