= Everett Withers =

American football player and coach (born 1963)

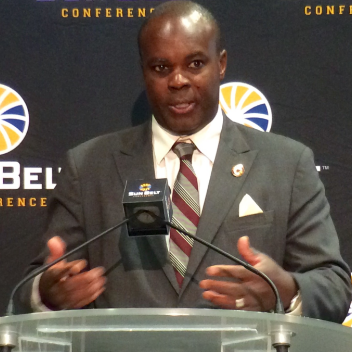
- Withers at the 2016 Sun Belt Media Day

Biographical details
- Born: June 15, 1963 (age 63); Charlotte, North Carolina, U.S.

Playing career
- 1981–1985: Appalachian State
- Positions: Defensive back, linebacker

Coaching career (HC unless noted)
- 1988: Austin Peay (DB)
- 1989: Austin Peay (DC)
- 1990: Austin Peay (WR/ST)
- 1991: Tulane (OLB)
- 1992–1993: Southern Miss (assistant ST/DB)
- 1994: New Orleans Saints (DQC)
- 1995–1997: Louisville (AHC/DC/DB)
- 1998–2000: Texas (DB)
- 2001–2006: Tennessee Titans (DB)
- 2007: Minnesota (DC)
- 2008–2010: North Carolina (DC/DB)
- 2011: North Carolina (interim HC)
- 2012–2013: Ohio State (AHC/co-DC/S)
- 2014–2015: James Madison
- 2016–2018: Texas State
- 2019: New York Giants (DB)
- 2020: Texas (analyst)
- 2021: FIU (AHC/DC/S)
- 2022: Temple (AHC)
- 2023 (spring): Florida Atlantic (AHC/PGC)
- 2023–2024: Temple (DC/OLB)
- 2024: Temple (Interim HC/DC/OLB)

Head coaching record
- Overall: 32–43
- Bowls: 0–1
- Tournaments: 0–2 (NCAA D-I playoffs)

Everett Rowe Withers (born June 15, 1963) is an American football coach and former player. He was the defensive coordinator at FIU, and was the defensive backs coach for the New York Giants and as the head coach for the Texas State Bobcats. Withers served as head football coach at University of North Carolina at Chapel Hill during the 2011 season, at James Madison University in the 2014 and 2015 seasons, and as the interim head coach at Temple following Stan Drayton's firing in 2024.

== Early years ==
Withers was born in Charlotte, North Carolina on June 15, 1963. He attended West Charlotte High School and later attended Appalachian State University for college, graduating in 1985. He was a standout defensive back for the Mountaineers and a captain.

== Coaching career ==
Withers started his coaching career at Austin Peay State University as the defensive coordinator in 1988. He then proceeded to coach wide receivers and special teams at Austin Peay before moving on to coach outside linebackers at Tulane University in 1991. A year later he went to the University of Southern Mississippi to coach defensive backs. Withers then moved to the National Football League (NFL), joining the New Orleans Saints as a defensive quality controller in 1994. He then took the job of defensive coordinator at the University of Louisville, serving from 1995 to 1997. He then joined the University of Texas at Austin coaching staff as the defensive backs coach in 1998. In 2001, he went back to the NFL to take the job of defensive backs coach of the Tennessee Titans. In 2007, he took the job of defensive coordinator at the University of Minnesota. He then took the defensive coordinator job at the University of North Carolina at Chapel Hill (UNC) in 2008. He was promoted to interim head coach from the defensive coordinator position after Butch Davis was fired on July 27, 2011.

=== Coaching successes ===
Withers has made accomplishments at several of his coaching stops, both college and the NFL. While he was the defensive backs coach of the Titans, they achieved a top ten defensive ranking in 2002, his first season with the Titans. From 2002 to 2004, the Titans grabbed 57 interceptions, the best ever for a three-year span for the franchise, fourth best in the AFC and eighth best in the NFL. The Titans tallied 21 picks in 2004, with 16 coming from the Withers coached secondary. In his first year with the Tar Heels, his defense totaled 20 interceptions, one shy of the school record for interceptions in a year. 2009 was an elite year for Withers's defense as they ranked sixth in total defense in the nation. They ranked 10th against the run, 13th in scoring defense and 14th in pass defense. The UNC defense was the only defense in the nation that was ranked in the top 15 in total yards allowed, scoring defense, run defense, pass defense, pass-efficiency defense, third down defense and tackles for loss. The Carolina defense totaled 19 interceptions and set an ACC record with 508 interception return yards. In 2010, the Tar Heels matched their interception total of 2009 with 19 picks. The Heels also ranked fourth in the ACC and 30th nationally in defense, even with injuries that made Withers play a different lineup every game. During the three total years that Withers was defensive coordinator of the Tar Heels, they totaled 58 interceptions.

=== 2011 season ===
With Withers leading the Tar Heels as the new head coach the 2011 season got started with many distractions. The Tar Heels beat their first opponent, FCS school James Madison University 42–10. Bryn Renner set the single game school record for completion percentage at 95.7%. The Heels then beat Rutgers University 24–22, holding the Scarlet Knights to one total yard rushing and 244 yards overall. The week after, the South's Oldest Rivalry was resumed, as Carolina beat the University of Virginia 28–17. UNC rushed for 222 total yards for an average of 5.4 yards per carry. The Heels then traveled to Atlanta to play #25 Georgia Tech, dropping this one 35–28. Georgia Tech had 312 yards rushing and 496 yards total on the day. Next the Heels played East Carolina University beating them 35–20. The Heels then proceeded to beat the University of Louisville 14–7. Giovani Bernard became the first Tar Heel rusher in 27 years to rush for over 100 yards in four straight games. Bernard extended his streak of 100 yard rushing games to five in UNC's 30–24 loss to University of Miami. The Heels recovered an onside kick with under a minute to go, but time ran out before they could score. The Heels then traveled to Clemson University to face the Tigers, losing 59–38. It was the second most points given up by the Tar Heels in their 405 ACC games, trailing only the 63 given up in a game against Florida State University in 2000. The next game was the Homecoming game for the Heels, and they beat Wake Forest University 49–24. UNC racked up 506 total yards and caught four interceptions in the game. Next up for the Heels was the rivalry game with North Carolina State University in Raleigh, which the Heels lost 13–0. It was the fifth straight loss to the Wolfpack, the first shutout in the series since 1960. Giovani Bernard did break the 1,000 yard rushing mark for the season, but as a team the Heels were held to three total yards rushing. On a Thursday night in Blacksburg, Virginia the Heels lost to Virginia Tech 24–21. Dwight Jones passed the 1,000 yard receiving mark for the season, making the 2011 Tar Heels the first team to have a 1,000 yard receiver and rusher in the same season. UNC closed out the regular season with a home win over arch-rival Duke University, winning 37–21. The Heels have won the last 20 of 21 games in the series and hold an all time advantage of 58–35–4. Dwight Jones's 79 receptions and Bryn Renner's 23 TD passes set single season records for the Tar Heels.

=== James Madison ===
On December 20, 2013, Withers accepted the position of head football coach at James Madison University. During a successful first campaign with the Dukes, Withers led the team back to the FCS playoffs for the first time since 2011 and was named a finalist for the Eddie Robinson FCS Coach of the Year award.

=== Texas State ===
On January 6, 2016, Withers accepted the position of head football coach at Texas State University. In three seasons with the Bobcats Withers amassed 7 wins and 28 losses. Withers was terminated from the position on November 18, 2018, because of the lack of success and wins for the program. He was replaced by West Virginia University offensive coordinator Jake Spavital.

=== New York Giants ===
On February 26, 2019, it was reported that Withers was hired as the defensive backs coach of the New York Giants. He had agreed to become the defensive coordinator at FIU shortly before. He replaced Lou Anarumo, who left to be the Cincinnati Bengals defensive coordinator.

=== Texas ===
Withers wasn't retained following the New York Giants' dismissal of Pat Shurmur. He then joined Tom Herman's staff at Texas as a defensive analyst.

=== FIU ===
In January 2021, Withers was announced as the defensive coordinator at FIU, reuniting him with former North Carolina head coach, Butch Davis.

=== Temple ===
In January 2022, Withers was named Chief of Staff to the Head Coach for Temple Owls football program by Head Coach Stan Drayton. Withers became interim head coach on November 17, 2024, after Temple fired Drayton. Temple hired K. C. Keeler as Drayton's permanent replacement on December 1.

== Head coaching record ==
Year	Team	Overall	Conference	Standing	Bowl/playoffs	STATS^{#}	Coaches^{°}
North Carolina Tar Heels (Atlantic Coast Conference) (2011)
2011	North Carolina	7–6	3–5	T–4th (Coastal)	L Independence		
North Carolina:		7–6	3–5				
James Madison Dukes (Colonial Athletic Association) (2014–2015)
2014	James Madison	9–4	6–2	3rd	L NCAA Division I First Round	18	19
2015	James Madison	9–3	6–2	T–1st	L NCAA Division I Second Round	11	11
James Madison:		18–7	12–4				
Texas State Bobcats (Sun Belt Conference) (2016–2018)
2016	Texas State	2–10	0–8	11th			
2017	Texas State	2–10	1–7	12th			
2018	Texas State	3–8	1–6	(Note: Withers was fired after the 11th game of the season in 2018.)			
Texas State:		7–28	2–21				
Temple Owls (American Athletic Conference) (2024)
2024	Temple	0–2	0–2	T–11th			
Temple:		0–2	0–2				
Total:		32–43					
National championship Conference title Conference division title or championship game berth
