= 2011 Independence Bowl =

2011 AdvoCare V100 Independence Bowl
- 36th Independence Bowl
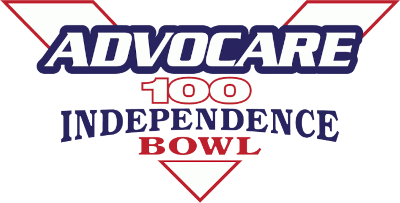
Missouri Tigers	North Carolina Tar Heels
(7–5)	(7–5)
Big 12	ACC
41	24
Head coach: Gary Pinkel	Head coach: Everett Withers (interim)
	1	2	3	4	Total
Missouri	14	17	7	3	41
North Carolina	7	3	7	7	24
- Date: December 26, 2011
- Season: 2011
- Stadium: Independence Stadium
- Location: Shreveport, Louisiana
- MVP: QB James Franklin, Missouri; LB Andrew Wilson, Missouri
- Favorite: Missouri by 4
- Referee: Dan Capron (Big Ten)
- Attendance: 41,728
- Payout: US$1.1 million per team

United States TV coverage
- Network: ESPN2
- Announcers: Rob Stone (Play-by-Play); Danny Kanell (Analyst); Allison Williams (Sidelines)
- Nielsen ratings: 1.53

The 2011 AdvoCare V100 Independence Bowl, the 36th edition of the Independence Bowl, was a post-season American college football bowl game, held on December 26, 2011 at Independence Stadium in Shreveport, Louisiana as part of the 2011–12 NCAA bowl season. The game's title sponsor was AdvoCare, an American dietary supplement company.

The game, telecast at 4:00 p.m. CT on ESPN2, featured the Missouri Tigers from the Big 12 Conference versus the North Carolina Tar Heels from the Atlantic Coast Conference. This marked Missouri's third appearance in the Independence Bowl in the previous nine seasons, all under head coach Gary Pinkel, while North Carolina made its first appearance in this bowl.

== Teams ==
The two teams had previously met twice with Missouri winning both games, in 1973 (27–14 in Chapel Hill) and 1976 (24–3 in Columbia). It marked North Carolina’s first game against a member of the Big 12 conference since a 52–21 loss to Texas in Chapel Hill in 2002.

=== North Carolina ===
The Tar Heels had a 14–14 bowl game record after the previous year's defeat of Tennessee in the 2010 Music City Bowl. The team was led by freshman tailback Giovani Bernard, who had 1,222 yards that season (sixth in school history) and by senior wide receiver Dwight Jones, who had 1,119 yards (second in school receiving yards). Sophomore quarterback Bryn Renner was a starter that year, who tied the school record with 23 touchdown passes.

=== Missouri ===
This game marked Mizzou’s third appearance in the game since 2003, winning over South Carolina in 2005 (38–31) and losing a 2003 contest to Arkansas (27–14). The Tigers, playing in their final football game as a member of the Big 12, were led by sophomore quarterback James Franklin, who ranked 15th in the NCAA in total offense (298.25 yards per game), had thrown for 200 yards or more six times during the season, and had run 839 yards and 13 rushing TDs. Missouri was ranked highly in the country in rushing offense (235.67 yards per game) and in total offense (472.42 yards per game).

== Scoring Summary ==
Scoring Play	Score
1st Quarter
NC – Dwight Jones 22 Yd Pass From Bryn Renner (Thomas Moore Kick), 12:12	NC 7–0
MIZZ – Wes Kemp 40 Yd Pass From T.J. Moe (Trey Barrow Kick), 10:06	Tie 7-7
MIZZ – James Franklin 2 Yd Run (Trey Barrow Kick), 2:15	MIZZ 14-7
2nd Quarter
MIZZ – Trey Barrow 31 Yd Field Goal, 11:11	MIZZ 17-7
MIZZ – Jerrell Jackson 8 Yd Pass From James Franklin (Trey Barrow Kick), 5:13	MIZZ 24-7
MIZZ – Kendial Lawrence 9 Yd Run (Trey Barrow Kick), 1:58	MIZZ 31-7
NC – Thomas Moore 21 Yd Field Goal, 0:00	MIZZ 31-10
3rd Quarter
NC – Jheranie Boyd 44 Yd Pass From Bryn Renner (Thomas Moore Kick), 4:22	MIZZ 31-17
MIZZ – James Franklin 2 Yd Run (Trey Barrow Kick), 1:56	MIZZ 38-17
4th Quarter
MIZZ – Trey Barrow 26 Yd Field Goal, 6:22	MIZZ 41-17
NC – Erik Highsmith 17 Yd Pass From Bryn Renner (Thomas Moore Kick), 4:08	MIZZ 41-24

=== Statistics ===
Statistics	MIZZ	NC
First downs	27	20
Rushes-yards (net)	46–337	19–36
Passing yards (net)	176	317
Att-Comp-Int	26–17–1	42–27–1
Total yards	513	353
Time of Possession	34:20	25:40
