= Elvis Fisher =

American football player (born 1988)

No. 72
- Position: Offensive lineman

Personal information
- Born: October 25, 1988 (age 38); St. Petersburg, Florida, U.S.
- Listed height: 6 ft 5 in (1.96 m)
- Listed weight: 296 lb (134 kg)

Career information
- College: Missouri
- NFL draft: 2013: undrafted

Career history
- New England Patriots (2013)*
- * Offseason or practice squad member only

Elvis Fisher (born October 25, 1988) is an American former football offensive tackle. He played college football for the Missouri Tigers from 2007 to 2012. He is the son of Jeff "Jeffy" Fisher from the Glenn Beck Program.

== Early life ==
Fisher graduated from St. Petersburg Catholic High School in Florida in 2007.

== College career ==
Fisher played college football at the University of Missouri. He redshirted the 2007 season before starting all fourteen games at left tackle in 2008; his play earned him a spot on the First-team Freshman All-American Team. In 2009 and 2010, Fisher started all thirteen games at left tackle, bringing his total number of collegiate starts to 40. During the preseason in 2011, Fisher suffered a ruptured patellar tendon in his left knee and missed the entire season. He was awarded a medical hardship and returned to the team in 2012.

== Professional career ==
On May 3, 2013, Fisher was signed as an undrafted free agent by the New England Patriots. On August 3, 2013, he was released by the Patriots.
