= Jerrell Jackson =

American gridiron football player (born 1990)

No. 18, 89
- Position: Wide receiver

Personal information
- Born: February 6, 1990 (age 36); Houston, Texas, U.S.
- Listed height: 6 ft 0 in (1.83 m)
- Listed weight: 192 lb (87 kg)

Career information
- High school: Houston (TX) Davis
- College: Missouri
- NFL draft: 2012: undrafted

Career history
- Houston Texans (2012)*; Jacksonville Jaguars (2012); Chicago Bears (2013)*; Kansas City Chiefs (2013–2014)*; Winnipeg Blue Bombers (2014)
- * Offseason or practice squad member only
- Stats at Pro Football Reference

Jerrell Jackson (born February 6, 1990) is an American former football wide receiver for the Winnipeg Blue Bombers of the Canadian Football League (CFL). He was signed by the Houston Texans as an undrafted free agent in 2012. He played college football at Missouri.

== College career ==
He played college football at Missouri from 2008 to 2011.

== Professional career ==
Pre-draft measurables
Height	Weight	Arm length	Hand span	40-yard dash	10-yard split	20-yard split	20-yard shuttle	Three-cone drill	Vertical jump	Broad jump	Bench press
6 ft 0 1/4 in (1.84 m)	196 lb (89 kg)	32 7/8 in (0.84 m)	9 1/4 in (0.23 m)	4.40 s	1.59 s	2.53 s	4.11 s	6.82 s	41.0 in (1.04 m)	10 ft 7 in (3.23 m)	22 reps
All values from NFL Combine/Pro Day

=== Houston Texans ===
Jackson signed with the Houston Texans on April 29, 2012, after he was not drafted during the 2012 NFL draft.

=== Jacksonville Jaguars ===
Jackson was signed to the Jacksonville Jaguars practice squad on December 14, 2012. He was promoted to the active roster on December 24. He was released on April 29, 2013.

=== Chicago Bears ===
Jackson signed with the Chicago Bears on June 10, 2013. Jackson was waived on August 18.

=== Kansas City Chiefs ===
Jackson signed with the Kansas City Chiefs during the 2014 offseason, but was released by the team on August 25, 2014.

=== Winnipeg Blue Bombers ===
Jackson was signed by the Winnipeg Blue Bombers on October 16, 2014.
