= Quinton Coples =

American football player (born 1990)

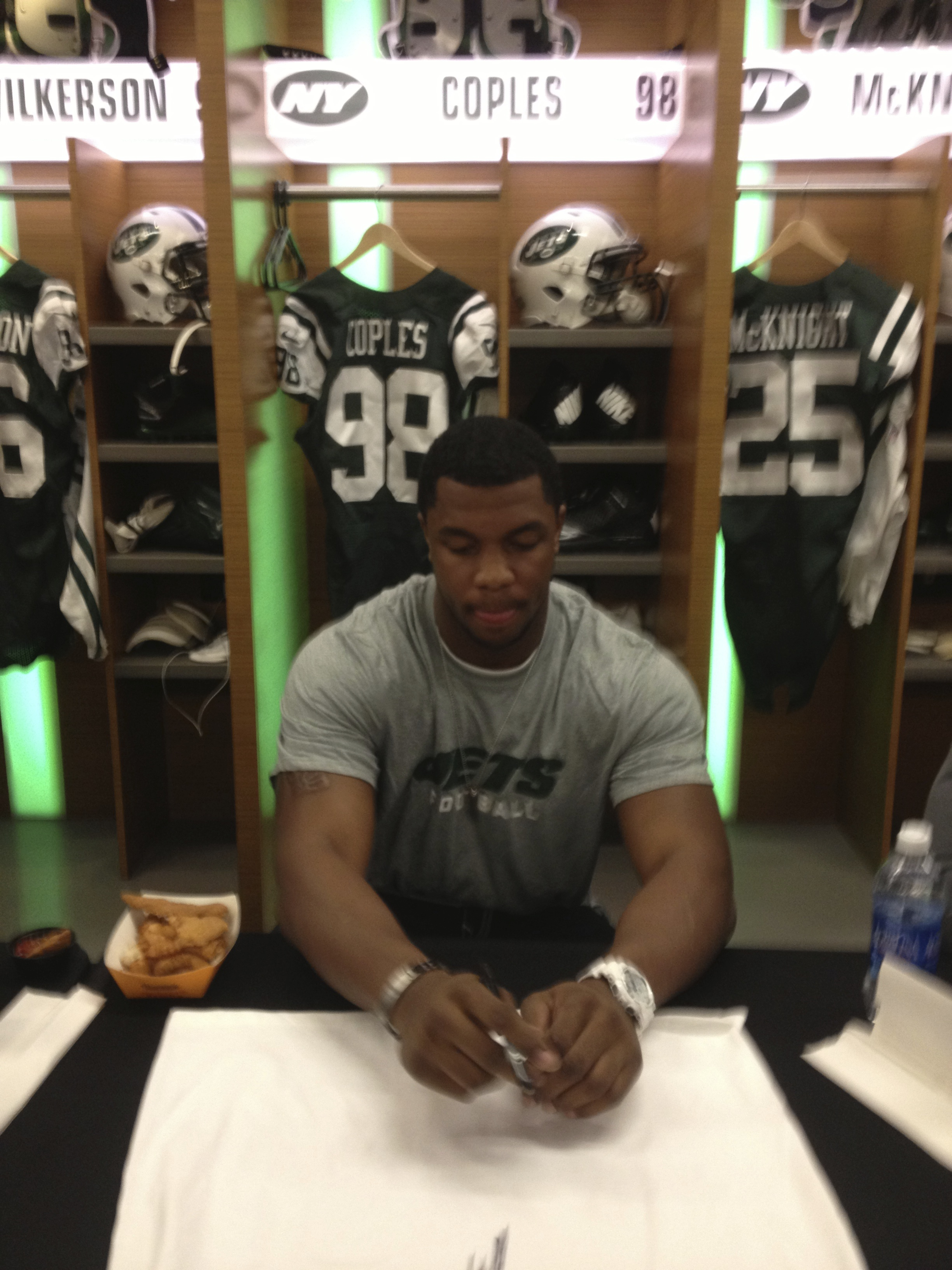
- Coples signing autographs in 2013

No. 98
- Position: Defensive end

Personal information
- Born: June 22, 1990 (age 36); Kinston, North Carolina, U.S.
- Listed height: 6 ft 6 in (1.98 m)
- Listed weight: 290 lb (132 kg)

Career information
- High school: Kinston
- College: North Carolina (2008–2011)
- NFL draft: 2012: 1st round, 16th overall pick

Career history
- New York Jets (2012–2015); Miami Dolphins (2015); Los Angeles Rams (2016)*
- * Offseason or practice squad member only

Awards and highlights
- 2× First-team All-ACC (2010, 2011)

Career NFL statistics
- Total tackles: 114
- Sacks: 16.5
- Forced fumbles: 2
- Fumble recoveries: 1
- Stats at Pro Football Reference

Quinton Kyle Coples (born June 22, 1990) is an American former professional football player who was a defensive end in the National Football League (NFL). He was selected by the New York Jets in the first round of the 2012 NFL draft. He played college football for the North Carolina Tar Heels.

Coples spent parts of his first five seasons in the NFL with the Jets, becoming a starter during his second season with the team in 2013. After being released by the Jets partway during the 2015 season, he was acquired by the Miami Dolphins where he spent the rest of the season as a backup. After being released by the Dolphins during the 2016 offseason, he signed with the Los Angeles Rams, but was released before the season began.

== Early life ==
Coples attended Kinston High School, and later transferred to Hargrave Military Academy in Chatham, Virginia. He was rated a four-star recruit by Rivals.com.

College recruiting
Name	Hometown	School	Height	Weight	40^{‡}	Commit date
Quinton Coples; DE	Kinston, North Carolina	Hargrave Military Academy	6 ft 7 in (2.01 m)	235 lb (107 kg)	4.8	Jan 18, 2008
Quinton Coples; DE	Recruit ratings: Scout: Rivals:					
Overall recruit ranking: Scout: 21 (DE) Rivals: 105, 3 (DE), 4 (V)
‡ Refers to 40-yard dash; Note: In many cases, Scout, Rivals, 247Sports, On3, and ESPN may conflict in their listings of height, weight and 40 time.; In these cases, the average was taken. ESPN grades are on a 100-point scale.; Sources: "North Carolina Football Commitments". Rivals.; "2008 North Carolina Football Recruiting Commits". Scout.; "Scout.com Team Recruiting Rankings". Scout.; "2008 Team Ranking". Rivals.com.

== College career ==
As a junior in 2010 Coples was named a first team All-ACC selection after recording 59 tackles and 10 sacks. Coples finished college with 144 tackles, 24 sacks and 5 Forced fumbles.

== Professional career ==
=== Pre-draft ===
Pre-draft measurables
Height	Weight	Arm length	Hand span	Wingspan	40-yard dash	10-yard split	20-yard split	20-yard shuttle	Three-cone drill	Vertical jump	Broad jump	Bench press
6 ft 5 3/4 in (1.97 m)	284 lb (129 kg)	33 1/4 in (0.84 m)	10 1/4 in (0.26 m)	6 ft 8 1/8 in (2.04 m)	4.78 s	1.68 s	2.81 s	4.78 s	7.57 s	31.5 in (0.80 m)	9 ft 1 in (2.77 m)	25 reps
All values from NFL Combine

Coples was considered one of the best defensive end prospects for the 2012 NFL draft.

=== New York Jets ===
Coples was selected 16th overall in the first round of the 2012 NFL Draft by the New York Jets. He signed a four-year contract worth $8.8 million on May 17, 2012. During his rookie season of 2012, Coples compiled with 30 tackles and 5.5 sacks. The Jets finished 6–10 (tied 3rd in AFC East) that season.

With the acquisition of Sheldon Richardson in the 2013 NFL draft, the Jets announced that Coples would transition to outside linebacker. During a preseason game against the Jacksonville Jaguars on August 17, 2013, Coples suffered a hairline ankle fracture after defending a pass thrown by Chad Henne. The Jets projected that Coples was going to be out indefinitely due to the injury but he eventually returned during Week 3 against the Buffalo Bills on September 22, 2013. During the 2013 season, Coples performed well adjusting to outside linebacker playing 14 games (13 started) with 38 tackles, a forced fumble, 3 passes defended, and 4.5 sacks. The Jets finished 8–8 (tied 2nd in AFC East) that season.

In 2014, Coples played all 16 games with 15 starts mostly at the outside linebacker position and made 35 tackles with 6.5 sacks along with a forced fumble. The Jets plummeted to a 4-12 record, their worst record since 2007.

The Jets picked up the fifth-year, $7.8 million option of Coples' contract on April 23, 2015. Coples began to see limited playing time in 2015 due to lackluster performance, as he only made 8 tackles along with a fumble recovery in 10 games. The Jets waived Coples on November 23, 2015.

=== Miami Dolphins ===
On November 24, 2015, Coples was claimed off waivers by the Miami Dolphins. He was released by the Dolphins on February 12, 2016.

=== Los Angeles Rams ===
On March 16, 2016, Coples signed a two-year, $6.5 million contract with the Los Angeles Rams. He was released by the Rams on August 29, 2016.

== NFL career statistics ==
Legend
**Bold**	Career high

Year	Team	Games		Tackles					Interceptions					Fumbles			
Year	Team	GP	GS	Cmb	Solo	Ast	Sck	TFL	Int	Yds	TD	Lng	PD	FF	FR	Yds	TD
2012	NYJ	**16**	2	30	22	8	5.5	9	0	0	0	0	1	0	0	0	0
2013	NYJ	14	13	**39**	25	**14**	4.5	**11**	0	0	0	0	**2**	**1**	0	0	0
2014	NYJ	**16**	**15**	37	**26**	11	**6.5**	10	0	0	0	0	0	**1**	0	0	0
2015	NYJ	10	2	8	4	4	0.0	0	0	0	0	0	0	0	**1**	0	0
2015	MIA	6	0	0	0	0	0.0	0	0	0	0	0	0	0	0	0	0
Career		62	32	114	77	37	16.5	30	0	0	0	0	3	2	1	0	0
