= Dwight Jones (American football) =

American football player (born 1989)

No. 83
- Position: Wide receiver

Personal information
- Born: January 1, 1989 (age 37); Burlington, North Carolina, U.S.
- Listed height: 6 ft 3 in (1.91 m)
- Listed weight: 230 lb (104 kg)

Career information
- High school: Burlington (NC) Cummings
- College: North Carolina
- NFL draft: 2012: undrafted

Career history
- Houston Texans (2012)*; New York Jets (2013–2014)*; Arizona Rattlers (2015)*
- * Offseason or practice squad member only

Awards and highlights
- Second-team All-ACC (2011)
- Stats at Pro Football Reference
- Stats at ArenaFan.com

Dwight Jones Jr. (born January 1, 1989) is an American former football wide receiver. He was signed by the Houston Texans as an undrafted free agent in 2012. He played college football for the North Carolina Tar Heels.

== Early life ==
Jones attended Hugh M. Cummings High School in Burlington, North Carolina before transferring to Hargrave Military Academy in Chatham, Virginia. As a senior, he was a Parade All-American after he had 67 receptions for 1,396 yards and 12 touchdowns.

Jones was considered one of the top high school wide receiver recruits in 2008.

== College career ==
Jones went on to play for The University of North Carolina and as a freshman in 2008, Jones played in three games but did not record a reception. As a sophomore in 2009, he played in seven games and had five receptions for 21 yards. As a junior in 2010, he started in 12 of 13 games and had 62 receptions for 946 yards with four touchdowns. He was named an honorable mention All-ACC. As a senior in 2011, he played in all 13 games and had 85 receptions for 1196 yards and twelve touchdowns.

== Professional career ==
Pre-draft measurables
Height	Weight	Arm length	Hand span	40-yard dash	10-yard split	20-yard split	Vertical jump	Broad jump	Bench press
6 ft 3 1/4 in (1.91 m)	230 lb (104 kg)	34 in (0.86 m)	9 in (0.23 m)	4.55 s	1.66 s	2.72 s	33.0 in (0.84 m)	9 ft 1 in (2.77 m)	14 reps
All values from NFL Combine

=== Houston Texans ===
After going undrafted in the 2012 NFL draft, Jones was signed by the Houston Texans as an undrafted free agent. In May 2012, he informed the Texans of his decision to not pursue a professional football career. The team placed him on the reserve/did not report list shortly thereafter. He was released on June 12, 2013.

=== New York Jets ===
Jones was signed to the New York Jets' practice squad on December 18, 2013. He was released on May 19, 2014.

=== Arizona Rattlers ===
Jones was assigned to the Arizona Rattlers on October 24, 2014.

== Legal trouble ==
Jones was charged with felony killing an animal by starvation on April 6, 2015. Police found a dead dog lying half inside and half outside a dog house and another dog that was starving on February 19, 2015, at a time when the air temperature was 14 degrees.
