= 2011 Pac-12 Conference football season =

American college football season

- League: NCAA Division I FBS (Football Bowl Subdivision)
- Sport: American football
- Duration: September 2011 through January 2012
- Teams: 12

2012 NFL Draft
- Top draft pick: QB Andrew Luck, Stanford
- Picked by: Indianapolis Colts, 1st overall

Regular season
- North champions: Oregon Ducks; Stanford Cardinal
- North runners-up: Washington Huskies
- South champions: UCLA Bruins
- South runners-up: Utah Utes; Arizona State Sun Devils

Pac-12 Championship Game
- Champions: Oregon Ducks
- Runners-up: UCLA Bruins
- Finals MVP: LaMichael James (RB)

Football seasons
- 2010 2012

2011 Pac-12 Conference football standings
	Conf.			Overall
Team	W		L	W		L
North Division
No. 4 Oregon xy$	8	–	1	12	–	2
No. 7 Stanford x%	8	–	1	11	–	2
Washington	5	–	4	7	–	6
California	4	–	5	7	–	6
Oregon State	3	–	6	3	–	9
Washington State	2	–	7	4	–	8
South Division
No. 6 USC †	7	–	2	10	–	2
UCLA xy	5	–	4	6	–	8
Utah	4	–	5	8	–	5
Arizona State	4	–	5	6	–	7
Arizona	2	–	7	4	–	8
Colorado	2	–	7	3	–	10
Championship: Oregon 49, UCLA 31
$ – BCS representative as conference champion; % – BCS at-large representative; x – Division champion/co-champions; y – Championship game participant; † – USC ineligible for championship and postseason due to NCAA sanctions; Rankings from AP Poll

The 2011 Pac-12 Conference football season began on September 1, 2011 with Montana State at Utah and UC Davis at Arizona State. The conference's first game was played on September 10 with Utah at USC, and the final game played was the Pac-12 Championship Game on Friday, December 2. Oregon defeated UCLA to claim their third straight conference title. This is the first season for the conference as a 12-team league. In July 2011, Colorado and Utah joined the conference, at which time the league's name changed from the Pacific-10 Conference.

Seven teams accepted bowl bids, an improvement from four the previous season. The BCS bowls featured Oregon in the Rose Bowl against Big Ten champion Wisconsin and Stanford facing Big 12 champion Oklahoma State in the Fiesta Bowl. The Ducks claimed their first Rose Bowl victory since 1917, while the Cardinal fell to the Cowboys in overtime. Of the non-BCS bowl participants, only Utah won their matchup against Georgia Tech in the Sun Bowl.

Four teams changed head coaches. Arizona head coach Mike Stoops was fired midseason, while UCLA's Rick Neuheisel, Arizona State's Dennis Erickson, and Washington State's Paul Wulff were let go at the end of the season.

== Preseason ==
2011 Pac-12 Spring Football:

North Division

- California, Tue., March 15 – Sun., April 24
- Oregon, Mon., March 28 – Sat., April 30
- Oregon State, Mon., March 28 – Sat., April 30
- Stanford, Mon., Feb. 21 – Sat., April 9
- Washington, Tue., March 29 – Sat., April 30
- Washington State, Mon., March 7 – Sat., April 16

South Division

- Arizona, Mon., March 21 – Sat., April 16
- Arizona State, Tue., March 22 – Sat., April 23
- Colorado, Fri., March 11 – Sat., April 9
- UCLA, Thu., March 31 – Sat., April 23
- USC, Tue., March 22 – Sat., April 16
- Utah, Tue., March 8 – Sat., April 16

== Head coaches ==
- Mike Stoops (first six games)/Tim Kish (last six games), Arizona
- Dennis Erickson, Arizona State
- Jeff Tedford, California – 5th year
- Jon Embree, Colorado – 1st year
- Chip Kelly, Oregon – 3rd year
- Mike Riley, Oregon State – 10th year
- David Shaw, Stanford – 1st year
- Rick Neuheisel (regular season and Pac-12 Championship Game – 4th year/Mike Johnson (Kraft Fight Hunger Bowl), UCLA
- Lane Kiffin, USC – 2nd year
- Kyle Whittingham, Utah – 7th year
- Steve Sarkisian, Washington – 3rd year
- Paul Wulff, Washington State – 4th year

- David Shaw took over as head coach of the Stanford Cardinal after Jim Harbaugh was hired as head coach of the NFL's San Francisco 49ers.
- Mike Stoops was fired as head coach of the Arizona Wildcats on October 10 after starting the season 1–5 (their sole victory was against FCS Northern Arizona). Including the previous season, the Wildcats under Stoops had lost 10 consecutive games against FBS opponents, with their last victory over a FBS team taking place nearly a year earlier on October 30, 2010 against UCLA. They had then lost their final four games and the Alamo Bowl. Defensive Coordinator Tim Kish was named interim head coach for the remainder of the season. Former Michigan head coach Rich Rodriguez was named the new head coach on November 22.
- Rick Neuheisel was fired as head coach of the UCLA Bruins on November 28, but coached his final game in the inaugural Pac-12 Championship Game on December 2. Offensive coordinator Mike Johnson will coach the Bruins in the Kraft Fight Hunger Bowl. On December 10, 2011, Jim L. Mora was named new head coach of the Bruins.
- Arizona State announced on November 28 that Dennis Erickson will not return the following year as head coach, but will coach the Sun Devils in their bowl game. Former Pittsburgh head coach Todd Graham was announced as Erickson's successor on December 14.
- Paul Wulff was fired as the head coach of the Washington State Cougars on November 29. He was succeeded by former Texas Tech head coach Mike Leach on November 30.

== Rankings ==
Legend
	Increase in ranking
	Decrease in ranking
	Not ranked previous week
RV	Received votes but were not ranked in Top 25 of poll

		Pre	Wk 1	Wk 2	Wk 3	Wk 4	Wk 5	Wk 6	Wk 7	Wk 8	Wk 9	Wk 10	Wk 11	Wk 12	Wk 13	Wk 14	Final
Arizona	AP	RV	RV														
Arizona	C	RV	RV														
Arizona	Harris	Not released															
Arizona	BCS	Not released															
Arizona State	AP	RV	RV	22	RV	25	22	18	24	23	20	RV	RV				
Arizona State	C	RV	23	18	RV	RV	24	20	25	20	18	RV	RV				
Arizona State	Harris	Not released						19	23	20	19	RV	RV				
Arizona State	BCS	Not released								21	19						
California	AP				RV												
California	C		RV	RV	RV												
California	Harris	Not released															
California	BCS	Not released															
Colorado	AP																
Colorado	C																
Colorado	Harris	Not released															
Colorado	BCS	Not released															
Oregon	AP	3	13	12	10	9	9	9	9	7	6	6	4	9	8	6	4
Oregon	C	3	14	14	13	11	9	9	8	7	6	6	4	9	7	5	4
Oregon	Harris	Not released						9	9	7	6	6	4	9	7	5	
Oregon	BCS	Not released							10	7	8	7	4	10	9	5	
Oregon State	AP																
Oregon State	C	RV															
Oregon State	Harris	Not released															
Oregon State	BCS	Not released															
Stanford	AP	7	6	6	5	6	7	7	7	4	4	3	8	4	4	4	7
Stanford	C	6	6	6	5	4	4	5	5	3	3	2	9	5	4	4	7
Stanford	Harris	Not released						7	7	4	4	3	7	4	3	4	
Stanford	BCS	Not released							8	6	4	4	9	6	4	4	
UCLA	AP																
UCLA	C																
UCLA	Harris	Not released															
UCLA	BCS	Not released															
USC	AP	25	RV	RV	23	RV	RV	RV	RV	20	21	18	18	10	9	5	6
USC	C	Ineligible for ranking															
USC	Harris	Not released						Ineligible for ranking									
USC	BCS	Not released							Ineligible for ranking								
Utah	AP	RV	RV		RV	RV											
Utah	C	RV	RV		RV	RV							RV	RV			
Utah	Harris	Not released															
Utah	BCS	Not released															
Washington	AP	RV		RV		RV	RV	RV	22	RV	RV	RV	RV				
Washington	C	RV	RV	RV	RV	RV	RV	RV	24	RV	RV	RV					
Washington	Harris	Not released						RV	25	RV	RV	RV					
Washington	BCS	Not released							25								
Washington State	AP																
Washington State	C																
Washington State	Harris	Not released															
Washington State	BCS	Not released															

== Schedule ==
Index to colors and formatting
Pac-12 member won
Pac-12 member lost
Pac-12 teams in **bold**

=== Week one ===
Date	Time	Visiting team	Home team	Site	TV	Result	Attendance	Ref.
September 1	5:00 p.m.	Montana State	**Utah**	Rice-Eccles Stadium • Salt Lake City, UT	KJZZ	**W** 27–10	45,311	
September 1	7:00 p.m.	UC Davis	**Arizona State**	Sun Devil Stadium • Tempe, AZ	FCS	**W** 48–14	45,671	
September 3	12:30 p.m.	Minnesota	No. 25 **USC**	Los Angeles Memorial Coliseum • Los Angeles, CA	ABC	**W** 19–17	68,273	
September 3	12:30 p.m.	**UCLA**	Houston	Robertson Stadium • Houston, TX	FSN	**L** 34–38	31,144	
September 3	1:00 p.m.	Sacramento State	**Oregon State**	Reser Stadium • Corvallis, OR		**L** 28–29 ^{OT}	41,581	
September 3	2:00 p.m.	San Jose State	No. 7 **Stanford**	Stanford Stadium • Stanford, CA	CSNBA	**W** 57–3	47,816	
September 3	2:00 p.m.	Idaho State	**Washington State**	Martin Stadium • Pullman, WA		**W** 64–21	22,034	
September 3	4:00 p.m.	Fresno State	**California**	Candlestick Park • San Francisco, CA	CSNCA	**W** 36–21	31,563	
September 3	4:00 p.m.	Eastern Washington	**Washington**	Husky Stadium • Seattle, WA	RTNW	**W** 30–27	58,088	
September 3	5:00 p.m.	No. 3 **Oregon**	No. 4 LSU	Cowboys Stadium • Arlington, TX (Cowboys Classic)	ABC	**L** 27–40	87,711	
September 3	7:00 p.m.	Northern Arizona	**Arizona**	Arizona Stadium • Tucson, AZ	FSAZ	**W** 41–10	51,761	
September 3	7:15 p.m.	**Colorado**	Hawaiʻi	Aloha Stadium • Honolulu, HI	ESPN2	**L** 17–34	37,001	
^{#}Rankings from AP Poll released prior to game. All times are in Pacific Time.

=== Week two ===
Date	Time	Visiting team	Home team	Site	TV	Result	Attendance	Ref.
September 8	5:00 p.m.	**Arizona**	No. 9 Oklahoma State	Boone Pickens Stadium • Stillwater, OK	ESPN	**L** 14–37	54,654	
September 9	7:30 p.m.	No. 21 Missouri	**Arizona State**	Sun Devil Stadium • Tempe, AZ	ESPN	**W** 37–30 ^{OT}	70,236	
September 10	9:00 a.m.	**Oregon State**	No. 8 Wisconsin	Camp Randall Stadium • Madison, WI	ESPN	**L** 0–35	80,337	
September 10	12:30 p.m.	**California**	**Colorado**	Folsom Field • Boulder, CO	FCS	**CAL** 36–33 ^{OT}	49,532	
September 10	12:30 p.m.	Hawaiʻi	**Washington**	Husky Stadium • Seattle, WA	RTNW	**W** 40–32	63,252	
September 10	12:30 p.m.	Nevada	No. 13 **Oregon**	Autzen Stadium • Eugene, OR	FX	**W** 69–20	58,818	
September 10	12:30 p.m.	No. 6 **Stanford**	Duke	Wallace Wade Stadium • Durham, NC	ESPNU	**W** 44–14	24,785	
September 10	2:00 p.m.	UNLV	**Washington State**	Martin Stadium • Pullman, WA		**W** 59–7	27,018	
September 10	4:30 p.m.	**Utah**	**USC**	Los Angeles Memorial Coliseum • Los Angeles, CA	Versus	**USC** 23–14	73,821	
September 10	7:00 p.m.	San Jose State	**UCLA**	Rose Bowl • Pasadena, CA	Prime Ticket	**W** 27–17	42,685	
^{#}Rankings from AP Poll released prior to game. All times are in Pacific Time. The California vs Colorado game is considered a non-conference game.

=== Week three ===
Date	Time	Visiting team	Home team	Site	TV	Result	Attendance	Ref.
September 17	10:30 a.m.	**Colorado**	Colorado State	Sports Authority Field at Mile High • Denver, CO (Rocky Mountain Showdown)	FSN	**W** 28–14	57,816	
September 17	12:30 p.m.	Missouri State	No. 12 **Oregon**	Autzen Stadium • Eugene, OR		**W** 56–7	58,847	
September 17	12:30 p.m.	No. 24 Texas	**UCLA**	Rose Bowl • Pasadena, CA	ABC/ESPN	**L** 20–49	54,583	
September 17	12:30 p.m.	**Washington**	No. 10 Nebraska	Memorial Stadium • Lincoln, NE	ABC/ESPN	**L** 38–51	85,110	
September 17	2:30 p.m.	Presbyterian	**California**	AT&T Park • San Francisco, CA		**W** 63–12	33,952	
September 17	3:00 p.m.	**Washington State**	San Diego State	Qualcomm Stadium • San Diego, CA	The Mtn.	**L** 24–42	57,286	
September 17	4:00 p.m.	No. 22 **Arizona State**	Illinois	Memorial Stadium • Champaign, IL	BTN	**L** 14–17	50,669	
September 17	5:00 p.m.	Syracuse	**USC**	Los Angeles Memorial Coliseum • Los Angeles	FX	**W** 38–17	65,873	
September 17	6:15 p.m.	**Utah**	BYU	LaVell Edwards Stadium • Provo, UT (Holy War)	ESPN2	**W** 54–10	63,742	
September 17	7:45 p.m.	No. 6 **Stanford**	**Arizona**	Arizona Stadium • Tucson, AZ	ESPN	**STAN** 37–10	49,636	
^{#}Rankings from AP Poll released prior to game. All times are in Pacific Time.

=== Week four ===
Date	Time	Visiting team	Home team	Site	TV	Result	Attendance	Ref.
September 24	12:30 p.m.	**California**	**Washington**	Husky Stadium • Seattle, WA	FSN	**UW** 31–23	60,437	
September 24	12:30 p.m.	**Colorado**	Ohio State	Ohio Stadium • Columbus, OH	ABC	**L** 37–17	105,096	
September 24	12:30 p.m.	**UCLA**	**Oregon State**	Reser Stadium • Corvallis, OR	FCS	**UCLA** 27–19	44,352	
September 24	7:15 p.m.	No. 10 **Oregon**	**Arizona**	Arizona Stadium • Tucson, AZ	ESPN2	**ORE** 56–31	56,096	
September 24	7:15 p.m.	No. 23 **USC**	**Arizona State**	Sun Devil Stadium • Tempe, AZ	ESPN	**ASU** 43–22	61,495	
^{#}Rankings from AP Poll released prior to game. All times are in Pacific Time.

=== Week five ===
Date	Time	Visiting team	Home team	Site	TV	Result	Attendance	Ref.
October 1	12:30 p.m.	**Arizona**	**USC**	Los Angeles Memorial Coliseum • Los Angeles, CA	FSN	**USC** 48–41	63,707	
October 1	12:30 p.m.	**Washington State**	**Colorado**	Folsom Field • Boulder, CO	FCS	**WSU** 31–27	51,928	
October 1	4:00 p.m.	**Washington**	**Utah**	Rice-Eccles Stadium • Salt Lake City, UT	FSN	**UW** 31–14	45,412	
October 1	7:30 p.m.	**Oregon State**	No. 25 **Arizona State**	Sun Devil Stadium • Tempe, AZ	FSAZ/FCS	**ASU** 35–20	57,437	
October 1	7:30 p.m.	**UCLA**	No. 6 **Stanford**	Stanford Stadium • Stanford, CA	FSN	**STAN** 45–19	50,360	
^{#}Rankings from AP Poll released prior to game. All times are in Pacific Time.

=== Week six ===
Date	Time	Visiting team	Home team	Site	TV	Result	Attendance	Ref.
October 6	6:00 p.m.	**California**	No. 9 **Oregon**	Autzen Stadium • Eugene, OR	ESPN	**ORE** 43–15	58,796	
October 8	12:30 p.m.	**Arizona**	**Oregon State**	Reser Stadium • Corvallis, OR	FCS	**ORST** 37–27	40,403	
October 8	12:30 p.m.	No. 22 **Arizona State**	**Utah**	Rice-Eccles Stadium • Salt Lake City, UT	FSN	**ASU** 35–14	45,089	
October 8	4:30 p.m.	**Colorado**	No. 7 **Stanford**	Stanford Stadium • Stanford, CA	Versus	**STAN** 48–7	50,360	
October 8	7:30 p.m.	**Washington State**	**UCLA**	Rose Bowl • Pasadena, CA	FSN	**UCLA** 28–25	64,217	
^{#}Rankings from AP Poll released prior to game. All times are in Pacific Time.

=== Week seven ===
Date	Time	Visiting team	Home team	Site	TV	Result	Attendance	Ref.
October 13	6:00 p.m.	**USC**	**California**	AT&T Park • San Francisco, CA	ESPN	**USC** 30–9	44,043	
October 15	9:00 a.m.	**Utah**	Pittsburgh	Heinz Field • Pittsburgh, PA	ESPNU	**W** 26–14	43,719	
October 15	12:30 p.m.	**Colorado**	**Washington**	Husky Stadium • Seattle, WA	RSRM/FCS	**UW** 52–24	62,147	
October 15	1:00 p.m.	BYU	**Oregon State**	Reser Stadium • Corvallis, OR	FCS/KBYU-TV	**L** 28–38	42,584	
October 15	4:30 p.m.	No. 7 **Stanford**	**Washington State**	Martin Stadium • Pullman, WA	Versus	**STAN** 44–14	30,843	
October 15	7:15 p.m.	No. 18 **Arizona State**	No. 9 **Oregon**	Autzen Stadium • Eugene, OR	ESPN	**ORE** 41–27	60,055	
^{#}Rankings from AP Poll released prior to game. All times are in Pacific Time.

=== Week eight ===
Date	Time	Visiting team	Home team	Site	TV	Result	Attendance	Ref.
October 20	6:00 p.m.	**UCLA**	**Arizona**	Arizona Stadium • Tucson, AZ	ESPN	**ARIZ** 48–12	46,565	
October 22	12:30 p.m.	No. 9 **Oregon**	**Colorado**	Folsom Field • Boulder, CO	FSN	**ORE** 45–2	52,123	
October 22	4:00 p.m.	**Utah**	**California**	AT&T Park • San Francisco, CA	KJZZ-TV/CSNBA	**CAL** 34–10	35,182	
October 22	4:30 p.m.	**USC**	Notre Dame	Notre Dame Stadium • Notre Dame, IN (Notre Dame–USC rivalry)	NBC	**W** 31–17	80,795	
October 22	5:00 p.m.	No. 22 **Washington**	No. 7 **Stanford**	Stanford Stadium • Stanford, CA	ABC	**STAN** 65–21	50,360	
October 22	7:30 p.m.	**Oregon State**	**Washington State**	CenturyLink Field • Seattle, WA	FSN	**ORST** 44–21	49,219	
^{#}Rankings from AP Poll released prior to game. All times are in Pacific Time.

=== Week nine ===
Date	Time	Visiting team	Home team	Site	TV	Result	Attendance	Ref.
October 29	12:00 p.m.	**Washington State**	No. 7 **Oregon**	Autzen Stadium • Eugene, OR	FSN	**ORE** 43–28	59,126	
October 29	3:30 p.m.	**Colorado**	No. 23 **Arizona State**	Sun Devil Stadium • Tempe, AZ	FSAZ/RSRM	**ASU** 48–14	53,168	
October 29	4:00 p.m.	**California**	**UCLA**	Rose Bowl • Pasadena, CA	Prime Ticket	**UCLA** 31–14	55,604	
October 29	4:00 p.m.	**Oregon State**	**Utah**	Rice-Eccles Stadium • Salt Lake City, UT	KJZZ-TV/RSNW	**UTAH** 27–8	45,017	
October 29	5:00 p.m.	No. 4 **Stanford**	No. 20 **USC**	Los Angeles Memorial Coliseum • Los Angeles, CA	ABC	**STAN** 56–48 ^{3OT}	93,607	
October 29	7:30 p.m.	**Arizona**	**Washington**	Husky Stadium • Seattle, WA	FSN	**WASH** 42–31	59,825	
^{#}Rankings from AP Poll released prior to game. All times are in Pacific Time.

=== Week ten ===
Date	Time	Visiting team	Home team	Site	TV	Result	Attendance	Ref.
November 4	6:00 p.m.	No. 21 **USC**	Colorado	Folsom Field • Boulder, CO	ESPN	**USC** 42–17	50,083	
November 5	12:30 p.m.	No. 4 **Stanford**	Oregon State	Reser Stadium • Corvallis, OR	ABC	**STAN** 38–13	42,835	
November 5	3:30 p.m.	**Washington State**	California	AT&T Park • San Francisco, CA	CSNCA/RSNW	**CAL** 30–7	35,506	
November 5	4:00 p.m.	**Utah**	Arizona	Arizona Stadium • Tucson, AZ	FSAZ/FCS	**UTAH** 34–21	50,839	
November 5	4:30 p.m.	No. 20 **Arizona State**	UCLA	Rose Bowl • Pasadena, CA	Versus	**UCLA** 29–28	65,438	
November 5	7:30 p.m.	No. 6 **Oregon**	Washington	Husky Stadium • Seattle, WA	FSN	**ORE** 34–17	69,407	
^{#}Rankings from AP Poll released prior to game. All times are in Pacific Time.

=== Week eleven ===
Date	Time	Visiting team	Home team	Site	TV	Result	Attendance	Ref.
November 12	11:30 a.m.	**Arizona**	**Colorado**	Folsom Field • Boulder, CO	FCS	**COLO** 48–29	48,111	
November 12	12:30 p.m.	**Washington**	No. 18 **USC**	Los Angeles Memorial Coliseum • Los Angeles, CA	FX	**USC** 40–17	64,756	
November 12	3:30 p.m.	**Oregon State**	**California**	AT&T Park • San Francisco, CA	CSNCA/RSNW	**CAL** 23–6	39,602	
November 12	3:30 p.m.	**UCLA**	**Utah**	Rice-Eccles Stadium • Salt Lake City, UT	KJZZ/Prime Ticket	**UTAH** 31–6	45,039	
November 12	5:00 p.m.	No. 6 **Oregon**	No. 3 **Stanford**	Stanford Stadium • Stanford, CA	ABC	**ORE** 53–30	50,360	
November 12	7:30 p.m.	**Arizona State**	**Washington State**	Martin Stadium • Pullman, WA	Versus	**WSU** 37–27	27,213	
^{#}Rankings from AP Poll released prior to game. All times are in Pacific Time.

=== Week twelve ===
Date	Time	Visiting team	Home team	Site	TV	Result	Attendance	Ref.
November 19	12:30 p.m.	**Washington**	**Oregon State**	Reser Stadium • Corvallis, OR	RTNW	**ORST** 38–21	42,766	
November 19	2:00 p.m.	**Utah**	**Washington State**	Martin Stadium • Pullman, WA	KJZZ/FCS	**UTAH** 30–27 ^{OT}	16,419	
November 19	4:30 p.m.	**Colorado**	**UCLA**	Rose Bowl • Pasadena, CA	Versus	**UCLA** 45–6	57,334	
November 19	5:00 p.m.	No. 18 **USC**	No. 4 **Oregon**	Autzen Stadium • Eugene, OR	ABC	**USC** 38–35	59,933	
November 19	6:30 p.m.	**Arizona**	**Arizona State**	Sun Devil Stadium • Tempe, AZ (Territorial Cup)	FSAZ	**ARIZ** 31–27	72,694	
November 19	7:15 p.m.	**California**	No. 8 **Stanford**	Stanford Stadium • Stanford, CA (Big Game)	ESPN	**STAN** 31–28	50,360	
^{#}Rankings from AP Poll released prior to game. All times are in Pacific Time.

=== Week thirteen ===
Date	Time	Visiting team	Home team	Site	TV	Result	Attendance	Ref.
November 25	12:30 p.m.	**Colorado**	**Utah**	Rice-Eccles Stadium • Salt Lake City, UT (Rumble in the Rockies)	FSN	**COLO** 17–14	45,026	
November 25	7:15 p.m.	**California**	**Arizona State**	Sun Devil Stadium • Tempe, AZ	ESPN	**CAL** 47–38	52,350	
November 26	12:30 p.m.	**Oregon State**	No. 9 **Oregon**	Autzen Stadium • Eugene, OR (Civil War)	ABC	**ORE** 49–21	59,802	
November 26	1:00 p.m.	Louisiana–Lafayette	**Arizona**	Arizona Stadium • Tucson, AZ		**W** 49–21	38,819	
November 26	4:30 p.m.	**Washington State**	**Washington**	CenturyLink Field • Seattle, WA (Apple Cup)	Versus	**WASH** 38–21	64,559	
November 26	5:00 p.m.	No. 22 Notre Dame	No. 4 **Stanford**	Stanford Stadium • Stanford, CA (Notre Dame–Stanford rivalry)	ABC	**W** 28–14	50,360	
November 26	7:00 p.m.	**UCLA**	No. 10 **USC**	Los Angeles Memorial Coliseum • Los Angeles, CA (Victory Bell)	FSN	**USC** 50–0	93,607	
^{#}Rankings from AP Poll released prior to game. All times are in Pacific Time.

=== Week fourteen (Pac-12 Championship Game) ===
Date	Time	Visiting team	Home team	Site	TV	Result	Attendance	Ref.
December 2	5:00 p.m.	UCLA	No. 8 Oregon	Autzen Stadium • Eugene, OR (2011 Pac-12 Football Championship Game)	Fox	**ORE** 49–31	59,376	
^{#}Rankings from AP Poll released prior to game. All times are in Pacific Time.

== Pac-12 vs. BCS matchups ==
Date	Visitor	Home	Winning team	Notes
September 3	Minnesota	#25 USC	USC	USC quarterback Matt Barkley and wide receiver Robert Woods set school records for completions and receptions, respectively.
September 3	#3 Oregon	#4 LSU	LSU	In the Cowboys Classic at Cowboys Stadium in Arlington, Texas, Oregon running back LaMichael James became the school's career rushing leader.
September 8	Arizona	#9 Oklahoma State	Oklahoma State	In a rematch of the 2010 Alamo Bowl, Oklahoma State receiver Justin Blackmon extended his NCAA record streak of at least 100 receiving yards for the 14th straight game.
September 9	#21 Missouri	Arizona State	Arizona State	Arizona State ended Missouri's 22 non-conference game winning streak in overtime.
September 10	Oregon State	#8 Wisconsin	Wisconsin	Wisconsin had its first shutout victory since 2009.
September 10	#6 Stanford	Duke	Stanford	Stanford quarterback Andrew Luck tied Jim Plunkett for the second-most wins in school history.
September 17	#23 Texas	UCLA	Texas	Texas defeated UCLA for the first time since 1971.
September 17	Washington	#11 Nebraska	Nebraska	Nebraska had its straight non-conference home win.
September 17	#22 Arizona State	Illinois	Illinois	Illinois had its first victory over Arizona State after losing in the two previous meetings.
September 17	Syracuse	USC	USC	In the teams' first meeting since 1990, the Trojans improved their record against the Orange to 3–0.
September 24	Colorado	Ohio State	Ohio State	The teams met for the first time since 1986. Colorado's record road losing streak was extended to 19 games.
October 15	Utah	Pittsburgh	Utah	Utah's record against Pitt improved to 3–0 and their record against the Big East Conference remained undefeated at 9–0.
October 22	USC	Notre Dame	USC	USC had its ninth victory in the ten most recent games of the Notre Dame–USC football rivalry in the first night game at Notre Dame Stadium in 21 years.
November 26	#22 Notre Dame	#4 Stanford	Stanford	Stanford's third consecutive victory in the Notre Dame–Stanford football rivalry. Quarterback Andrew Luck set new records for single-season touchdown passes, career touchdown passes, and total offense, and became only the third quarterback to defeat the Irish three straight times.

== Bowl games ==
Pac-12 teams played in the following bowl games. Pac-12 teams are bolded.

Bowl Game	Date	Stadium	City	Television	Time (PST)	Team	Score	Team	Score
Maaco Bowl Las Vegas	December 22	Sam Boyd Stadium	Whitney, Nevada	ESPN	5:00 p.m.	#8 Boise State	56	**Arizona State**	24
Holiday Bowl	December 28	Qualcomm Stadium	San Diego, California	ESPN	5:00 p.m.	Texas	21	**California**	10
Alamo Bowl	December 29	Alamodome	San Antonio, Texas	ESPN	6:00 p.m.	#15 Baylor	67	**Washington**	56
Sun Bowl	December 31	Sun Bowl Stadium	El Paso, Texas	CBS	11:00 a.m.	**Utah**	30	Georgia Tech	27 (OT)
Kraft Fight Hunger Bowl	December 31	AT&T Park	San Francisco, California	ESPN	12:30 p.m.	Illinois	20	**UCLA**	14
Rose Bowl	January 2	Rose Bowl	Pasadena, California	ESPN	2:00 p.m.	#6 **Oregon**	45	#9 Wisconsin	38
Fiesta Bowl	January 2	University of Phoenix Stadium	Glendale, Arizona	ESPN	5:30 p.m.	#3 Oklahoma State	41	#4 **Stanford**	38 (OT)

== Players of the week ==
Following each week of games, Pac-12 conference officials selected the players of the week from the conference's teams.

Week	Offensive			Defensive			Special teams		
Week	Player	Position	Team	Player	Position	Team	Player	Position	Team
9/5/11	Robert Woods	WR	USC	Desmond Trufant	CB	UW	Erik Folk	PK	UW
9/12/11	Paul Richardson	WR	COLO	Cort Dennison	LB	UW	Everrette Thompson	DT	UW
9/19/11	Matt Barkley	QB	USC	Trevor Reilly	DE	UTAH	Brendan Bigelow	KR	CAL
9/26/11	LaMichael James	RB	ORE	Shelly Lyons	LB	ASU	Jordan Poyer	PR/KR	ORST
10/3/11	Matt Barkley	QB	USC	Alex Hoffman-Ellis	LB	WSU	Jamal Miles	PR/KR	ASU
10/10/11	LaMichael James	RB	ORE	Lance Mitchell	S	ORST	Clayton York	FB	ORST
10/17/11	Andrew Luck	QB	STAN	Derrick Shelby	DE	UTAH	Coleman Petersen	PK	UTAH
10/24/11	Sean Mannion	QB	ORST	Scott Crichton	DE	ORST	John Bonano	PK	ARIZ
10/31/11	Chris Polk	RB	UW	Tevin McDonald	S	UCLA	Eric Whitaker	PK	STAN
11/7/11	Matt Barkley	QB	USC	Eddie Pleasant	DB	ORE	Sean Sellwood	P	UTAH
11/14/11	Connor Halliday	QB	WSU	Travis Sandersfeld	DB	COLO	Marqise Lee	KR/WR	USC
11/21/11	Marqise Lee	WR	USC	Hayes Pullard	LB	USC	Coleman Petersen	PK	UTAH
11/28/11	Matt Barkley	QB	USC	Jon Major	LB	COLO	Giorgio Tavecchio	PK	CAL

=== Position key ===
Center	C	Cornerback	CB	Defensive back	DB	Defensive end	DE
Defensive lineman	DL	Defensive tackle	DT	Guard	G	Kickoff returner	KR
Offensive tackle	OT	Offensive lineman	OL	Linebacker	LB	Long snapper	LS
Punter	P	Placekicker	PK	Punt returner	PR	Quarterback	QB
Running back	RB	Safety	S	Tight end	TE	Wide receiver	WR

== Home attendance ==
Team	Stadium	Capacity	Game 1	Game 2	Game 3	Game 4	Game 5	Game 6	Game 7	Game 8	Total	Average	% of Capacity
Arizona	Arizona Stadium	57,803	51,761	49,636	56,096	46,565	50,839	38,819	—	—	293,716	48,953	84.69%
Arizona State	Sun Devil Stadium	73,379	45,671	70,236	61,495	57,437	53,168	72,694	52,350	—	413,051	59,007	80.41%
California	AT&T Park^{A}	41,915	33,952	44,043	35,182	35,506	39,602	—	—	—	188,285	37,657	89.85%
Colorado	Folsom Field	53,613	49,532	51,928	52,123	50,083	48,111	—	—	—	251,777	50,355	93.92%
Oregon	Autzen Stadium	54,000	58,818	58,847	58,796	60,055	59,126	59,933	59,802	59,376	474,753	59,344	109.90%
Oregon State	Reser Stadium	45,674	41,581	44,352	40,403	42,584	42,835	42,766	—	—	254,521	42,420	92.88%
Stanford	Stanford Stadium	50,000	47,816	50,360	50,360	50,360	50,360	50,360	50,360	—	349,976	49,997	99.99%
UCLA	Rose Bowl	91,136	42,685	54,583	64,217	55,604	65,438	57,334	—	—	339,861	56,644	62.15%
USC	Los Angeles Memorial Coliseum	93,607	68,273	73,821	65,873	63,707	93,607	64,756	93,607	—	523,644	74,806	79.91%
Utah	Rice-Eccles Stadium	45,017	45,311	45,412	45,089	45,017	45,039	45,026	—	—	270,894	45,149	100.29%
Washington	Husky Stadium	72,500	58,088	63,252	60,437	62,147	59,825	69,407	64,559^{B}	—	437,715	62,531	87.19%
Washington State	Martin Stadium	35,117	22,034	27,018	30,843	49,219^{C}	27,213	16,419	—	—	172,746	28,791	71.21%

^ADue to reconstruction at California Memorial Stadium, California played their 2011 home games in AT&T Park in San Francisco, California.
^BWashington official home game played versus Washington State in Seattle, WA at CenturyLink Field (capacity 67,000) as renovation began on Husky Stadium.
^CThis was an official Washington State home game played versus Oregon State at CenturyLink Field.

== Notes ==
- May 26, 2011 – The NCAA upheld all findings and penalties against USC in their infractions case on former players Reggie Bush and O. J. Mayo. The USC football team will not participate in the Pac-12 Football Championship Game or a bowl game.
- July 18, 2011 – USC running back Marc Tyler was suspended for the season opener against Minnesota for making inappropriate comments to the media.
- July 27, 2011 – Media Day in Los Angeles.
- November 30, 2011 - Stanford defensive assistant Chester McGlockton, who had been on the coaching staff for the past two seasons, died suddenly in his sleep.
- November 30, 2011 - The NCAA granted UCLA a waiver to still be bowl-eligible in the event of a loss in the Pac-12 title game to finish at 6-7. UCLA subsequently accepted a bid to participate in the Kraft Fight Hunger Bowl.
- December 5, 2011 - Oregon cornerback Cliff Harris was dismissed from the team for violating team rules. He had already been suspended from the team indefinitely following a traffic stop on October 24 and only played in six games during the season.
- December 10, 2011 - Stanford quarterback Andrew Luck becomes the fourth player to be a runner up for the Heisman Trophy in consecutive seasons and the first since Arkansas running back Darren McFadden in 2006 and 2007. In 2010, the award was won by Auburn quarterback Cam Newton and this year it was won by Baylor quarterback Robert Griffin III. This was the third year in a row that Stanford has had a runner-up for the Heisman (running back Toby Gerhart was the runner up in 2009).
- December 31, 2011 - Washington fires defensive coordinator Nick Holt, linebackers coach Mike Cox, and safeties coach Jeff Mills after the Huskies give up the most yards in school history in a 67-56 loss to Baylor in the Alamo Bowl.
- January 2, 2012 - Oregon defeats Wisconsin in the Rose Bowl for their first Rose Bowl victory since 1917, setting a record for most total points scored with 83. Stanford falls to Oklahoma State in the Fiesta Bowl in overtime, giving the Cowboys their first BCS bowl victory.

== Awards and honors ==
Johnny Unitas Golden Arm Award

- Andrew Luck, QB, Stanford

Maxwell Award

- Andrew Luck, QB, Stanford

Walter Camp Player of the Year Award

- Andrew Luck, QB, Stanford

=== All-Americans ===
Academic All-America Team Member of the Year (CoSIDA)

- Andrew Luck, QB, Stanford

AFCA Coaches' All-Americans First Team:

- OL David DeCastro, Stanford
- QB Andrew Luck, Stanford
- AP LaMichael James, Oregon

=== All-Pac-12 teams ===
- Offensive Player of the Year: Andrew Luck, QB, Stanford
- Pat Tillman Defensive Player of the Year: Mychal Kendricks, LB, California
- Co-Offensive Freshman of the Year: Marqise Lee, WR, USC and De'Anthony Thomas, RB, Oregon
- Defensive Freshman of the Year: Dion Bailey, LB, USC
- Coach of the Year: David Shaw, Stanford

First Team:

Pos.	Name	Yr.	School	Pos.	Name	Yr.	School	Pos.	Name	Yr.	School
Offense				Defense				Specialists			
QB	Andrew Luck	Jr.	Stanford	DL	Dion Jordan	Jr.	Oregon	PK	Andre Heidari	Fr.	USC
RB	LaMichael James	Jr.	Oregon	DL	Star Lotulelei	Jr.	Utah	P	Bryan Anger	Sr.	California
RB	Chris Polk	Jr.	Washington	DL	Nick Perry	Jr.	USC	RS	De'Anthony Thomas	Fr.	Oregon
WR	Keenan Allen	So.	California	DL	Derrick Shelby	Sr.	Utah	ST	Rhett Ellison	Sr.	USC
WR	Robert Woods	So.	USC	LB	Josh Kaddu	Sr.	Oregon				
TE	Coby Fleener	Sr.	Stanford	LB	Mychal Kendricks	Sr.	California				
OL	Tony Bergstrom	Sr.	Utah	LB	Chase Thomas	Jr.	Stanford				
OL	David DeCastro	Jr.	Stanford	DB	Delano Howell	Sr.	Stanford				
OL	Matt Kalil	Jr.	USC	DB	T. J. McDonald	Jr.	USC				
OL	Jonathan Martin	Jr.	Stanford	DB	Eddie Pleasant	Sr.	Oregon				
OL	Mitchell Schwartz	Sr.	California	DB	Nickell Robey	So.	USC				

ST=special teams player (not a kicker or returner)

=== All-Academic ===
First team

Pos.	Name	School	Yr.	GPA	Major
QB	Andrew Luck	Stanford	RS Jr.	3.48	Architectural Design
RB	Malcolm Jones	UCLA	So.	3.20	Undeclared
RB	John Tyndall	California	Sr.	3.17	Interdisciplinary Studies/Peace & Conflict Studies
WR	Jared Karstetter	Washington State	Sr.	3.61	Zoology
WR	Luke Matthews	Utah	Jr.	3.66	Mass Communication
TE	David Paulson	Oregon	Gr.	3.67	Business
OL	Mark Asper	Oregon	Gr.	3.77	Educational Leadership
OL	Mark Brazinski	California	So.	3.68	Business Administration and Media Studies
OL	Mitchell Schwartz	California	Sr.	3.24	American Studies
OL	Tevita Stevens	Utah	Jr.	3.52	Spanish
OL	Carson York	Oregon	Jr.	3.75	Journalism and Communications
DL	Kevin Frahm	Oregon State	Sr.	3.30	Political Science
DL	Ernest Owusu	California	Sr.	3.31	Political Economy
DL	Will Pericak	Colorado	Jr.	3.43	Business-Finance
DL	Derrick Shelby	Utah	Sr.	3.25	Sociology
LB	Brent Etiz	Stanford	So.	3.52	Economics
LB	Paul Vassallo	Arizona	Sr.	3.48	Pre-Public Health
LB	J.J. Williams	Utah	Sr.	3.42	Economics
DB	Cameron Collins	Oregon State	Sr.	3.48	Business-Finance
DB	Kyle McCartney	Washington State	RS Jr.	3.80	Entrepreneurship
DB	Travis Sandersfeld	Colorado	RS Sr.	3.38	Business-Finance
DB	Greg Walker	Washington	Jr.	3.41	Biology
PK	John Bonano	Arizona	Sr.	3.90	Physiology
P	Sean Sellwood	Utah	Jr.	3.78	Exercise and Sport Science
ST	Brendan Lopez	Washington	Sr.	3.64	Neurobiology

== 2012 NFL draft ==
Round	Overall pick	NFL team	Player	Position	College
1	1	Indianapolis Colts	Andrew Luck	Quarterback	Stanford
1	4	Minnesota Vikings	Matt Kalil	Offensive tackle	USC
1	24	Pittsburgh Steelers	David DeCastro	Guard	Stanford
1	28	Green Bay Packers	Nick Perry	Linebacker	USC
2	34	Indianapolis Colts	Coby Fleener	Tight end	Stanford
2	37	Cleveland Browns	Mitchell Schwartz	Offensive tackle	California
2	42	Miami Dolphins	Jonathan Martin	Offensive tackle	Stanford
2	46	Philadelphia Eagles	Mychal Kendricks	Linebacker	California
2	57	Denver Broncos	Brock Osweiler	Quarterback	Arizona State
2	61	San Francisco 49ers	LaMichael James	Running back	Oregon
3	70	Jacksonville Jaguars	Bryan Anger	Punter	California
3	79	Chicago Bears	Brandon Hardin	Safety	Oregon State
3	88	Philadelphia Eagles	Nick Foles	Quarterback	Arizona
3	95	Oakland Raiders	Tony Bergstrom	Offensive guard	Utah
4	101	Denver Broncos	Omar Bolden	Cornerback	Arizona State
4	109	Pittsburgh Steelers	Alameda Ta'amu	Defensive tackle	Washington
4	128	Minnesota Vikings	Rhett Ellison	Fullback	USC
5	151	Arizona Cardinals	Senio Kelemete	Offensive guard	Washington
5	155	Miami Dolphins	Josh Kaddu	Linebacker	Oregon
5	160	Cleveland Browns	Ryan Miller	Offensive guard	Colorado
5	166	Cincinnati Bengals	Marvin Jones	Wide receiver	California
5	168	Oakland Raiders	Juron Criner	Wide receiver	Arizona
6	178	Buffalo Bills	Mark Asper	Offensive guard	Oregon
7	216	Carolina Panthers	D. J. Campbell	Safety	California
7	219	Minnesota Vikings	Trevor Guyton	Defensive end	California
7	231	Pittsburgh Steelers	Toney Clemons	Wide receiver	Colorado
7	240	Pittsburgh Steelers	David Paulson	Tight end	Oregon
7	245	Cleveland Browns	Trevin Wade	Cornerback	Arizona
