= 2011 Oregon Ducks football team =

American college football season

2011 Oregon Ducks football

Pac-12 champion Pac-12 North Division co-champion Rose Bowl champion

Pac-12 Championship Game, W 49–31 vs. UCLA

Rose Bowl, W 45–38 vs. Wisconsin
- Conference: Pac-12 Conference
- North Division

Ranking
- Coaches: No. 4
- AP: No. 4
- Record: 12–2 (8–1 Pac-12)
- Head coach: Chip Kelly (3rd season)
- Offensive coordinator: Mark Helfrich (3rd season)
- Offensive scheme: No-huddle spread option
- Defensive coordinator: Nick Aliotti (15th season)
- Base defense: Hybrid 3–4
- Captain: Game captains
- Home stadium: Autzen Stadium

2011 Pac-12 Conference football standings
	Conf.			Overall
Team	W		L	W		L
North Division
No. 4 Oregon xy$	8	–	1	12	–	2
No. 7 Stanford x%	8	–	1	11	–	2
Washington	5	–	4	7	–	6
California	4	–	5	7	–	6
Oregon State	3	–	6	3	–	9
Washington State	2	–	7	4	–	8
South Division
No. 6 USC †	7	–	2	10	–	2
UCLA xy	5	–	4	6	–	8
Utah	4	–	5	8	–	5
Arizona State	4	–	5	6	–	7
Arizona	2	–	7	4	–	8
Colorado	2	–	7	3	–	10
Championship: Oregon 49, UCLA 31
$ – BCS representative as conference champion; % – BCS at-large representative; x – Division champion/co-champions; y – Championship game participant; † – USC ineligible for championship and postseason due to NCAA sanctions; Rankings from AP Poll

The 2011 Oregon Ducks football team represented the University of Oregon in the 2011 NCAA Division I FBS football season. The team was led by third year head coach Chip Kelly and played their home games at Autzen Stadium for the 45th straight year. They are a member of the Pac-12 Conference in the North Division.

The Ducks won their third straight Pac-12 championship title after defeating UCLA in the inaugural Pac-12 Football Championship Game. They represented the Pac-12 in the Rose Bowl, where they defeated Wisconsin 45–38 to win their first Rose Bowl Championship since 1917. It was their second Rose Bowl appearance in three years and their sixth overall. This would be Oregon's third consecutive year in a BCS bowl game. The Ducks finished the season 12–2 (8–1 Pac-12).

== Before the season ==
=== Recruiting ===
College recruiting (2011)
Name	Hometown	School	Height	Weight	40^{‡}	Commit date
DeAnthony Thomas; ATH	Los Angeles	Crenshaw Senior HS	5 ft 10 in (1.78 m)	168 lb (76 kg)	4.4	Feb 3, 2011
DeAnthony Thomas; ATH	Recruit ratings: Scout: Rivals: (84)					
Colt Lyerla; ATH	Hillsboro, Oregon	Hillsboro HS	6 ft 5 in (1.96 m)	225 lb (102 kg)	4.5	Jan 8, 2011
Colt Lyerla; ATH	Recruit ratings: Scout: Rivals: (79)					
Devon Blackmon; WR	Fontana, California	Summit HS	6 ft 1 in (1.85 m)	178 lb (81 kg)	4.4	Jan 8, 2011
Devon Blackmon; WR	Recruit ratings: Scout: Rivals: (83)					
Andre Yruretagoyena; OT	Scottsdale, Arizona	Chaparral HS	6 ft 5 in (1.96 m)	262 lb (119 kg)	4.9	Jun 26, 2011
Andre Yruretagoyena; OT	Recruit ratings: Scout: Rivals: (81)					
Anthony Wallace; MLB	Dallas	Skyline HS	6 ft 1 in (1.85 m)	220 lb (100 kg)	4.5	Nov 21, 2010
Anthony Wallace; MLB	Recruit ratings: Scout: Rivals: (80)					
Ifo Ekpre-Olomu; CB	Chino Hills, California	Chino Hills HS	5 ft 10 in (1.78 m)	180 lb (82 kg)	4.5	Nov 19, 2010
Ifo Ekpre-Olomu; CB	Recruit ratings: Scout: Rivals: (79)					
Tyler Johnstone; OT	Chandler, Arizona	Hamilton HS	6 ft 6 in (1.98 m)	260 lb (120 kg)	4.9	Jul 19, 2010
Tyler Johnstone; OT	Recruit ratings: Scout: Rivals: (78)					
Marshawn Lacy; WR	Riverside, California	Riverside Community College	6 ft 2 in (1.88 m)	185 lb (84 kg)	4.2	Sep 10, 2010
Marshawn Lacy; WR	Recruit ratings: Scout: Rivals: (–)					
Tyson Coleman; S	Lake Oswego, Oregon	Lake Oswego HS	6 ft 2 in (1.88 m)	203 lb (92 kg)	4.6	Oct 13, 2009
Tyson Coleman; S	Recruit ratings: Scout: Rivals: (79)					
Lake Koa-Ka'ai; DE	Honolulu, HI	Kamehameha Secondary	6 ft 4 in (1.93 m)	243 lb (110 kg)	4.8	Jan 20, 2011
Lake Koa-Ka'ai; DE	Recruit ratings: Scout: Rivals: (79)					
Jacob Fisher; OT	Traverse City, Michigan	Traverse City West Senior HS	6 ft 7 in (2.01 m)	272 lb (123 kg)	5.1	Feb 2, 2011
Jacob Fisher; OT	Recruit ratings: Scout: Rivals: (77)					
Tra Carson; RB	Texarkana, Texas	Liberty-Eylau HS	6 ft 1 in (1.85 m)	218 lb (99 kg)	4.6	Dec 18, 2010
Tra Carson; RB	Recruit ratings: Scout: Rivals: (76)					
Tacoi Sumler; WR	Miami, Florida	Christopher Columbus HS	5 ft 9 in (1.75 m)	158 lb (72 kg)	4.4	Jul 28, 2010
Tacoi Sumler; WR	Recruit ratings: Scout: Rivals: (81)					
Jared Ebert; DT	Council Bluffs, IA	Iowa Western	6 ft 5 in (1.96 m)	285 lb (129 kg)	4.8	Nov 27, 2010
Jared Ebert; DT	Recruit ratings: Scout: Rivals: (–)					
Tacoi Sumler; WR	Miami, Florida	Christopher Columbus HS	5 ft 9 in (1.75 m)	158 lb (72 kg)	4.4	Jul 28, 2010
Tacoi Sumler; WR	Recruit ratings: Scout: Rivals: (81)					
Christian French; TE	Cedar Rapids, IA	John F Kennedy HS	6 ft 6 in (1.98 m)	230 lb (100 kg)	4.4	Dec 9, 2010
Christian French; TE	Recruit ratings: Scout: Rivals: (79)					
BJ Kelly; WR	Fresno, California	Central High East Campus	6 ft 2 in (1.88 m)	175 lb (79 kg)	4.4	Jan 23, 2011
BJ Kelly; WR	Recruit ratings: Scout: Rivals: (80)					
Rahim Cassell; OLB	Lakewood, California	Lakewood HS	6 ft 0 in (1.83 m)	218 lb (99 kg)	NA	Sep 29, 2010
Rahim Cassell; OLB	Recruit ratings: Scout: Rivals: (79)					
Rodney Hardrick; MLB	Colton, California	Colton HS	6 ft 3 in (1.91 m)	205 lb (93 kg)	4.5	Dec 14, 2010
Rodney Hardrick; MLB	Recruit ratings: Scout: Rivals: (76)					
Sam Kamp; DE	Mesa, Arizona	Mountain View HS	6 ft 5 in (1.96 m)	231 lb (105 kg)	4.9	Apr 8, 2010
Sam Kamp; DE	Recruit ratings: Scout: Rivals: (75)					
Jamal Prater; OG	Etiwanda, California	Etiwanda HS	6 ft 5 in (1.96 m)	285 lb (129 kg)	NA	Aug 4, 2010
Jamal Prater; OG	Recruit ratings: Scout: Rivals: (73)					
James Euscher; OT	Beaverton, Oregon	Aloha HS	6 ft 7 in (2.01 m)	278 lb (126 kg)	NA	Jul 6, 2010
James Euscher; OT	Recruit ratings: Scout: Rivals: (71)					
Marcus Mariota; QB	Honolulu, HI	St. Louis School	6 ft 4 in (1.93 m)	188 lb (85 kg)	4.6	Jun 27, 2010
Marcus Mariota; QB	Recruit ratings: Scout: Rivals: (71)					
Carlyle Garrick; LB	Castro Valley, California	Castro Valley HS	6 ft 3 in (1.91 m)	210 lb (95 kg)	NA	Oct 22, 2010
Carlyle Garrick; LB	Recruit ratings: Scout: Rivals: (75)					
Overall recruit ranking: Scout: 12 Rivals: 9 ESPN: 14
‡ Refers to 40-yard dash; Note: In many cases, Scout, Rivals, 247Sports, On3, and ESPN may conflict in their listings of height, weight and 40 time.; In these cases, the average was taken. ESPN grades are on a 100-point scale.; Sources: "Oregon Football Commitment List 2011". Rivals.; "Oregon College Football Recruiting Commits 2011". Scout.; "Oregon Ducks Commits 2011". ESPN.; "Scout.com Team Recruiting Rankings". Scout.; "2011 Team Ranking". Rivals.com.

== Schedule ==
Date	Time	Opponent	Rank	Site	TV	Result	Attendance	Source
September 3	5:00 pm	vs. No. 4 LSU*	No. 3	Cowboys Stadium; Arlington, TX (Cowboys Classic, College GameDay)	ABC	L 27–40	87,711	
September 10	12:30 pm	Nevada*	No. 13	Autzen Stadium; Eugene, OR	FX	W 69–20	58,818	
September 17	12:30 pm	Missouri State*	No. 12	Autzen Stadium; Eugene, OR	CSNNW	W 56–7	58,847	
September 24	7:15 pm	at Arizona	No. 10	Arizona Stadium; Tucson, AZ	ESPN2	W 56–31	56,096	
October 6	6:00 pm	California	No. 9	Autzen Stadium; Eugene, OR	ESPN	W 43–15	58,796	
October 15	7:15 pm	No. 18 Arizona State	No. 9	Autzen Stadium; Eugene, OR (College GameDay)	ESPN	W 41–27	60,055	
October 22	12:30 pm	at Colorado	No. 9	Folsom Field; Boulder, CO	FSN	W 45–2	52,123	
October 29	12:00 pm	Washington State	No. 7	Autzen Stadium; Eugene, OR	FSN	W 43–28	59,126	
November 5	7:30 pm	at Washington	No. 6	Husky Stadium; Seattle, WA (rivalry)	FSN	W 34–17	69,407	
November 12	5:00 pm	at No. 3 Stanford	No. 6	Stanford Stadium; Stanford, CA (rivalry, College GameDay)	ABC	W 53–30	50,360	
November 19	5:00 pm	No. 18 USC	No. 4	Autzen Stadium; Eugene, OR (rivalry)	ABC/ESPN3	L 35–38	59,933	
November 26	12:30 pm	Oregon State	No. 9	Autzen Stadium; Eugene, OR (Civil War)	ABC/ESPN2	W 49–21	59,802	
December 2	5:00 pm	UCLA	No. 8	Autzen Stadium; Eugene, OR (Pac-12 Championship Game)	FOX	W 49–31	59,376	
January 2, 2012	2:10 pm	vs. No. 9 Wisconsin*	No. 6	Rose Bowl; Pasadena, CA (Rose Bowl, College GameDay)	ESPN	W 45–38	91,245	
*Non-conference game; Rankings from AP Poll released prior to the game; All times are in Pacific time; Source:

== Game summaries ==
=== LSU ===
#4 Oregon vs. #3 LSU (Cowboys Classic)

Team	1	2	3	4	Total
No. 4 Ducks	6	7	0	14	27
• No. 3 Tigers	3	13	14	10	40

- Date: September 3
- Location: Cowboys Stadium, Arlington, Texas
- Game attendance: 87,711
- Television network: ABC

On September 3, in a matchup of teams ranked in the top five in the AP Poll, Oregon lost to LSU 40–27, due in part to losing four turnovers while only forcing one LSU turnover. LSU was able to score after three of those turnovers, which led to 20 points, and built a 30–13 lead before the end of the third quarter. Oregon freshman running back De'Anthony Thomas fumbled on consecutive Oregon possessions late in the third quarter, one on a rushing attempt and then on the ensuing kickoff. The Tigers scored touchdowns as a result of both turnovers with runs from Michael Ford and Spencer Ware in a span of less than 4 minutes. Oregon outgained LSU in total offensive yards 335 to 273 during the game.

1st quarter scoring: LSU – Drew Alleman 44 Yd Field Goal; ORE – Yd Reception; Josh Huff 29 ORE – Beard 30 Yd Field Goal

2nd quarter scoring: LSU – Tyrann Mathieu 3 Yd Fumble Return (Pat Failed); ORE – LaMichael James 3 Yd Run (Beard Kick); LSU – Rueben Randle 10 Yd Pass From Jarrett Lee (Alleman Kick)

3rd quarter scoring: LSU – Michael Ford 5 Yd Run (Alleman Kick); LSU – Spencer Ware 1 Yd Run (Alleman Kick)

4th quarter scoring: LSU – Alleman 32 Yd Field Goal; ORE – Marshawn Lacy 8 Yd Pass From Darron Thomas (Beard Kick); LSU – Michael Ford 16 Yd Run (Alleman Kick); ORE – De'Anthony Thomas 4 Yd Run (Beard Kick)

=== Nevada ===
Nevada at #13 Oregon

Team	1	2	3	4	Total
Wolf Pack	0	7	6	7	20
• No. 13 Ducks	13	28	14	14	69

- Date: September 10
- Location: Autzen Stadium, Eugene, Oregon
- Game attendance: 58,818
- Television network: FX

1st quarter scoring: ORE – LaMichael James 4 Yd Run (Two-Point Run Conversion Failed); ORE – Lavasier Tuinei 3 Yd Pass From Darron Thomas (Alejandro Maldonado Kick)

2nd quarter scoring: ORE – LaMichael James 44 Yd Pass From Darron Thomas (Maldonado Kick); ORE – Marshawn Lacy 70 Yd Touchdown Pass From Darron Thomas (Maldonado Kick); ORE – Colt Lyerla 20 Yd Pass From Darron Thomas (Maldonado Kick); NEV – Mike Ball 5 Yd Pass From Tyler Lantrip (Anthony Martinez Kick); ORE – De'Anthony Thomas 24 Yd Pass From Darron Thomas (Maldonado Kick)

3rd quarter scoring: ORE – LaMichael James 58 Yd Punt Return (Maldonado Kick); NEV – Stefphon Jefferson 1 Yd Run (Pat Failed); ORE – De'Anthony Thomas 69 Yd Pass From Darron Thomas (Maldonado Kick)

4th quarter scoring: NEV – Cody Fajardo 7 Yd Run (Martinez Kick); ORE – Ayele Forde 26 Yd Run (Maldonado Kick); ORE – Boseko Lokombo 67 Yd Interception Return (Maldonado Kick)

=== Missouri State ===
Missouri State at #12 Oregon

Team	1	2	3	4	Total
Bears	7	0	0	0	7
• No. 12 Ducks	14	21	21	0	56

- Date: September 17
- Location: Autzen Stadium, Eugene, Oregon
- Game attendance: 58,847
- Television network: CSNNW

1st quarter scoring: MOSU – Chris Douglas 3 Yd Run (Austin Witmer Kick); ORE – LaMichael James 1 Yd Run (Alejandro Maldonado Kick); ORE – Lavasier Tuinei 8 Yd Pass From Darron Thomas (Maldonado Kick)

2nd quarter scoring: ORE – Colt Lyerla 7 Yd Pass From Darron Thomas (Maldonado Kick); ORE – LaMichael James 90 Yd Run (Maldonado Kick); ORE – Lavasier Tuinei 34 Yd Pass From Darron Thomas (Maldonado Kick)

3rd quarter scoring: ORE – LaMichael James 50 Yd Run (Maldonado Kick) – ORE – Colt Lyerla 26 Yd Pass From Bryan Bennett (Maldonado Kick); ORE – Eric Dungy 22 Yd Pass From Bryan Bennett Maldonado Kick)

4th quarter scoring:

=== Arizona ===
#10 Oregon at Arizona

Team	1	2	3	4	Total
• No. 10 Ducks	14	21	7	14	56
Wildcats	3	6	15	7	31

- Date: September 24
- Location: Arizona Stadium, Tucson, Arizona
- Game start: 10:15 p.m. EST
- Game attendance: 56,096
- Television network: ESPN2

Scoring summary
1	12:18	ORE	LaMichael James 12-yard run (Alejandro Maldonado kick)	ORE 7–0
1	7:58	ORE	Kenjon Barner 8-yard run (Alejandro Maldonado kick)	ORE 14–0
1	0:30	ARIZ	Alex Zendejas 28-yard field goal	ORE 14–3
2	13:24	ORE	David Paulson 10-yard pass from Darron Thomas (Alejandro Maldonado kick)	ORE 21–3
2	5:18	ORE	Kenjon Barner 6-yard pass from Darron Thomas (Alejandro Maldonado kick)	ORE 28–3
2	2:45	ORE	LaMichael James 19-yard run (Alejandro Maldonado kick)	ORE 35–3
2	1:04	ARIZ	Richard Morrison 34-yard pass from Nick Foles (kick blocked)	ORE 35–9
3	10:30	ARIZ	Keola Antolin 7-yard run (Alex Zendejas kick)	ORE 35–16
3	5:43	ARIZ	David Roberts 7-yard pass from Nick Foles (Nick Foles to David Douglas pass)	ORE 35–24
3	3:19	ORE	Darron Thomas 5-yard run (Alejandro Maldonado kick)	ORE 42–24
4	9:55	ORE	Kenjon Barner 1-yard run (Alejandro Maldonado kick)	ORE 49–24
4	6:29	ARIZ	David Roberts 4-yard pass from Nick Foles (Alex Zendejas kick)	ORE 49–31
4	1:45	ORE	Darron Thomas 2-yard run (Alejandro Maldonado kick)	ORE 56–31

Oregon's 56 points is the most points Arizona has allowed at home since LSU scored 59 points in 2003 at Arizona Stadium.

=== California ===
California at #9 Oregon

Team	1	2	3	4	Total
Golden Bears	6	9	0	0	15
• No. 9 Ducks	14	0	22	7	43

- Date: October 6
- Location: Autzen Stadium, Eugene, Oregon
- Game attendance: 58,796
- Television network: ESPN

=== Arizona State ===
#18 Arizona State at #9 Oregon

Team	1	2	3	4	Total
No. 18 Sun Devils	14	3	7	3	27
• No. 9 Ducks	7	14	14	6	41

- Date: October 15
- Location: Autzen Stadium, Eugene, Oregon
- Game attendance: 60,055
- Television network: ESPN

=== Colorado ===
#9 Oregon at Colorado

Team	1	2	3	4	Total
• No. 9 Ducks	29	6	10	0	45
Buffaloes	0	0	2	0	2

- Date: October 22
- Location: Folsom Field, Boulder, Colorado
- Game start: 3:30 p.m. EST
- Game attendance: 52,123
- Television network: FSN

Scoring summary
1	13:24	ORE	Kenjon Barner 4-yard run (Jackson Rice run)	ORE 8–0
1	7:06	ORE	De'Anthony Thomas 14-yard pass from Bryan Bennett (Alejandro Maldonado kick)	ORE 15–0
1	4:05	ORE	Kenjon Barner 84-yard run (Alejandro Maldonado kick)	ORE 22–0
1	1:13	ORE	Marshawn Lacy 31-yard pass from Bryan Bennett (Alejandro Maldonado kick)	ORE 29–0
2	8:10	ORE	Michael Clay 22-yard interception return (kick failed)	ORE 35–0
3	11:51	ORE	Tra Carson 1-yard run (Alejandro Maldonado kick)	ORE 42–0
3	6:25	ORE	Alejandro Maldonado 36-yard field goal	ORE 45–0
3	1:32	COL	Safety, Cliff Harris tackled by Terrel Smith in end zone	ORE 45–2

=== Washington State ===
Washington State at #7 Oregon

Team	1	2	3	4	Total
Cougars	0	10	10	8	28
• No. 7 Ducks	8	7	21	7	43

- Date: October 29
- Location: Autzen Stadium, Eugene, Oregon
- Game attendance: 59,126
- Television network: FSN

=== Washington ===
#6 Oregon at Washington

Team	1	2	3	4	Total
• No. 6 Ducks	10	7	17	0	34
Huskies	3	7	7	0	17

- Date: November 5
- Location: Husky Stadium, Seattle
- Game start: 10:30 p.m. EST
- Game attendance: 69,407
- Television network: FSN

Scoring summary
1	11:46	ORE	LaMichael James 18-yard run (Alejandro Maldonado kick)	ORE 7–0
1	7:17	WASH	Erik Folk 42-yard field goal	ORE 7–3
1	6:06	ORE	Alejandro Maldonado 40-yard field goal	ORE 10–3
2	10:10	ORE	David Paulson 4-yard pass from Darron Thomas (Alejandro Maldonado kick)	ORE 17–3
2	0:30	WASH	Michael Hartvigson 1-yard pass from Keith Price (Erik Folk kick)	ORE 17–10
3	12:23	ORE	Kenjon Barner 1-yard run (Alejandro Maldonado kick)	ORE 24–10
3	8:33	WASH	Kasen Williams 10-yard pass from Keith Price (Erik Folk kick)	ORE 24–17
3	6:05	ORE	De'Anthony Thomas 9-yard run (Alejandro Maldonado kick)	ORE 31–17
3	1:49	ORE	Alejandro Maldonado 35-yard field goal	ORE 34–17

=== Stanford ===
#6 Oregon at #3 Stanford

Team	1	2	3	4	Total
• No. 6 Ducks	8	14	14	17	53
No. 3 Cardinal	0	16	7	7	30

- Date: November 12
- Location: Stanford Stadium, Stanford, California
- Game start: 8:00 p.m. EST
- TV announcers (ABC): Brent Musburger (play-by-play), Kirk Herbstreit (analyst), Erin Andrews (sideline)

Scoring summary
1	4:12	ORE	Lavasier Tuinei 4-yard pass from Darron Thomas (David Paulson to Mike Garrity pass)	ORE 8–0
2	13:51	STAN	Griff Whalen 16-yard pass from Andrew Luck (kick failed)	ORE 8–6
2	11:49	ORE	LaMichael James 58-yard run (Alejandro Maldonado kick)	ORE 15–6
2	4:57	STAN	Eric Whitaker 27-yard field goal	ORE 15–9
2	2:52	ORE	De'Anthony Thomas 41-yard pass from Darron Thomas (Alejandro Maldonado kick)	ORE 22–9
2	0:24	STAN	Griff Whalen 13-yard pass from Andrew Luck (Eric Whitaker kick)	ORE 22–16
3	13:23	ORE	Marshawn Lacy 59-yard pass from Darron Thomas (Alejandro Maldonado kick)	ORE 29–16
3	7:41	ORE	LaMichael James 4-yard run (Alejandro Maldonado kick)	ORE 36–16
3	2:38	STAN	Jeremy Stewart 2-yard pass from Andrew Luck (Eric Whitaker kick)	ORE 36–23
4	14:02	ORE	LaMichael James 1-yard run (Alejandro Maldonado kick)	ORE 43–23
4	9:37	STAN	Jeremy Stewart 1-yard run (Eric Whitaker kick)	ORE 43–30
4	5:09	ORE	Alejandro Maldonado 40-yard field goal	ORE 46–30
4	4:28	ORE	Boseko Lokombo 40-yard interception return (Alejandro Maldonado kick)	ORE 53–30

=== USC ===
#18 USC at #4 Oregon

Team	1	2	3	4	Total
• No. 18 Trojans	7	14	17	0	38
No. 4 Ducks	0	7	13	15	35

- Date: November 19
- Location: Autzen Stadium, Eugene, Oregon

=== Oregon State ===
Oregon State at #9 Oregon

Team	1	2	3	4	Total
Beavers	0	7	0	14	21
• No. 9 Ducks	7	21	7	14	49

- Date: November 26
- Location: Autzen Stadium, Eugene, Oregon
- Game start: 3:30 p.m. EST
- Television network: ABC/ESPN

Scoring summary
1	12:36	ORE	LaMichael James 1-yard run (Alejandro Maldonado kick)	ORE 7–0
2	11:08	OSU	Jovan Stevenson 58-yard pass from Sean Mannion (Trevor Romaine kick)	Tied 7–7
2	8:05	ORE	David Paulson 16-yard pass from Darron Thomas (Alejandro Maldonado kick)	ORE 14–7
2	3:59	ORE	De'Anthony Thomas 8-yard pass from Darron Thomas (Alejandro Maldonado kick)	ORE 21–7
2	0:26	ORE	Kenjon Barner 16-yard pass from Darron Thomas (Alejandro Maldonado kick)	ORE 28–7
3	12:54	ORE	Kenjon Barner 1-yard run (Alejandro Maldonado kick)	ORE 35–7
4	13:43	ORE	Colt Lyerla 39-yard pass from Darron Thomas (Alejandro Maldonado kick)	ORE 42–7
4	6:55	OSU	Kevin Cummings 19-yard pass from Sean Mannion (Trevor Romaine kick)	ORE 42–14
4	4:43	ORE	Ayele Forde 8-yard run (Alejandro Maldonado kick)	ORE 49–14
4	2:46	OSU	Brandin Cooks 23-yard pass from Sean Mannion (Trevor Romaine kick)	ORE 49–21

=== UCLA (Pac-12 Championship) ===
UCLA at #8 Oregon

Team	1	2	3	4	Total
Bruins	7	10	7	7	31
• No. 8 Ducks	21	14	14	0	49

- Date: December 2
- Location: Autzen Stadium, Eugene, Oregon
- Game start: 8:00 p.m. EST

Scoring summary
1	13:13	ORE	LaMichael James 30-yard run (Alejandro Maldonado kick)	ORE 7–0
1	7:55	UCLA	Patrick Larimore 35-yard interception return (Tyler Gonzalez kick)	Tied 7–7
1	6:29	ORE	Darron Thomas 10-yard run (Alejandro Maldonado kick)	ORE 14–7
1	0:59	ORE	Colt Lyerla 7-yard pass from Darron Thomas (Alejandro Maldonado kick)	ORE 21–7
2	12:22	UCLA	Nelson Rosario 37-yard pass from Kevin Prince (Tyler Gonzalez kick)	ORE 21–14
2	8:27	ORE	LaMichael James 3-yard run (Alejandro Maldonado kick)	ORE 28–14
2	4:25	ORE	Daryle Hawkins 25-yard pass from Darron Thomas (Alejandro Maldonado kick)	ORE 35–14
2	0:00	UCLA	Tyler Gonzalez 44-yard field goal	ORE 35–17
3	12:10	UCLA	Kevin Prince 1-yard run (Tyler Gonzalez kick)	ORE 35–24
3	9:57	ORE	LaMichael James 5-yard run (Alejandro Maldonado kick)	ORE 42–24
3	4:45	ORE	David Paulson 22-yard pass from Darron Thomas (Alejandro Maldonado kick)	ORE 49–24
4	1:51	UCLA	Nelson Rosario 19-yard pass from Kevin Prince (Tyler Gonzalez kick)	ORE 49–31

=== Wisconsin (Rose Bowl) ===
#9 Wisconsin vs. #6 Oregon

Team	1	2	3	4	Total
No. 9 Badgers	14	14	10	0	38
• No. 6 Ducks	14	14	7	10	45

- Date: January 2
- Location: Rose Bowl, Pasadena, California
- Game start: 5:10 p.m.
- Game attendance: 91,245
- TV announcers (ABC): Brent Musburger & Kirk Herbstreit

Scoring summary
1	11:48	WIS	Jared Abbrederis 38-yard pass from Russell Wilson (Philip Welch kick)	WIS 7–0
1	9:41	ORE	LaMichael James 1-yard run (Alejandro Maldonado kick)	Tied 7–7
1	5:55	WIS	Russell Wilson 4-yard run (Philip Welch kick)	WIS 14–7
1	0:00	ORE	De'Anthony Thomas 91-yard run (Alejandro Maldonado kick)	Tied 14–14
2	10:52	WIS	Montee Ball 3-yard run (Philip Welch kick)	WIS 21–14
2	10:36	ORE	Kenjon Barner 54-yard pass from Darron Thomas (Alejandro Maldonado kick)	Tied 21–21
2	3:26	WIS	Louis Nzegwu 33-yard fumble return (Philip Welch kick)	WIS 28–21
2	0:30	ORE	Lavasier Tuinei 3-yard pass from Darron Thomas (Alejandro Maldonado kick)	Tied 28–28
3	14:11	ORE	De'Anthony Thomas 64-yard run (Alejandro Maldonado kick)	ORE 35–28
3	10:50	WIS	Philip Welch 29-yard field goal	ORE 35–31
3	4:44	WIS	Nick Toon 18-yard pass from Russell Wilson (Philip Welch kick)	WIS 38–35
4	14:35	ORE	Lavasier Tuinei 11-yard pass from Darron Thomas (Alejandro Maldonado kick)	ORE 42–38
4	6:50	ORE	Alejandro Maldonado 30-yard field goal	ORE 45–38

== Roster ==
2011 Oregon Ducks Football
Quarterback: 3 Bryan Bennett – (redshirt) Freshman; 14 Dustin Haines – Sophomore; 16 Daryle Hawkins – Sophomore; 5 Darron Thomas – Junior; Running back: 24 Kenjon Barner – Junior; 28 Tra Carson – Freshman; 31 Kenny Bassett – (redshirt) Freshman; 37 Anthony Blake – Sophomore; 33 Ayele Forde – (redshirt) Freshman; 21 LaMichael James – Junior; Offensive lineman: 78 Karrington Armstrong – Sophomore; 79 Mark Asper – Senior; 71 Everett Benyard – Sophomore; 60 Ryan Clanton – Junior; 61 Nick Cody – Junior; 57 Trevor Fox – Sophomore; 70 Ramsen Golpashin – Senior; 55 Hroniss Grasu – (redshirt) Freshman; 63 Mana Greig – Sophomore; 67 Josh Sanford – Senior; 73 Brenton Spickerman – Sophomore; 74 Darrion Weems – Senior; 77 Carson York – Junior; Wide receiver: 92 Ben Butterfield – Sophomore; 10 Rahsaan Vaughn – Junior; 9 Blake Cantu – Sophomore; 30 Nick Cole – Sophomore; 84 Chad Delaney – Sophomore; 19 Eric Dungy – (redshirt) Freshman; 91 Dane Ebanez – Sophomore; 81 Justin Hoffman – Junior; 1 Josh Huff – Sophomore; 7 Keanon Lowe – (redshirt) Freshman; 90 Will Murphy – Junior; 23 B.J Kelley – Junior; 41 Blake Stanton – (redshirt) Freshman; 6 De'Anthony Thomas – Freshman; 80 Lavasier Tuinei – Senior	Tight end: 32 Colt Lyerla – Freshman; 42 David Paulson – Senior; 86 Brian Teague – Sophomore; 98 Dallen Voeller – (redshirt) Freshman; 83 Curtis White – (redshirt) Freshman; 87 Brandon Williams – Senior; 82 Christian French – Freshman; Defensive lineman: 93 Jared Ebert – Junior; Defensive tackle: 60 Ryan Hagen – Sophomore; 66 Taylor Hart – Sophomore; 90 Ricky Heimuli – Sophomore; 92 Wade Keliikipi – Sophomore; 94 Axel McQuaw – Sophomore; 65 Isaac Remington – Junior; Defensive end: 85 Anthony Anderson – Sophomore; 44 Brandon Hanna – Senior; 96 Dion Jordan – Junior; 62 Nick Musgrove – Senior; 45 Terrell Turner – Senior; 91 Tony Washington – (redshirt) Freshman; Linebacker: 47 Kiko Alonso – Junior; 51 Isaac Ava – (redshirt) Freshman; 46 Michael Clay – Junior; 33 Tyson Coleman – Freshman; 38 Mike Garrity – (redshirt) Freshman; 56 Josh Kaddu – Senior; 43 Keloni Kamalani – Sophomore; 25 Boseko Lokombo – Sophomore; 22 Derrick Malone – (redshirt) Freshman; 53 Jennings Stewart – Junior; 52 Dewitt Stuckey – Senior; 40 Blake Thompson – Senior; 59 Grant Thompson – (redshirt) Freshman	Defensive back: 4 Erick Dargan – (redshirt) Freshman; 5 Issac Dixon – Freshman; 28 Scott Grady – Junior; 2 Troy Hill – (redshirt) Freshman; 12 Brian Jackson – Sophomore; 32 J.R. Maffie – Sophomore; 27 Terrance Mitchell – (redshirt) Freshman; 17 James Scales – (redshirt) Freshman; Cornerback: 3 Dior Mathis – (redshirt) Freshman; 13 Cliff Harris – Junior; 14 Ifo Ekpre-Olomu – Freshman; 18 Anthony Gildon – Senior; 31 Avery Patterson – Sophomore; Safety: 20 John Boyett – Junior; 11 Eddie Pleasant – Senior; Long snapper: 50 Drew Howell – Sophomore; 59 Jeff Palmer – Junior; Punter: 49 Jackson Rice – Junior; Placekicker: 93 Rob Beard – Junior; 41 Alejandro Maldonado – Sophomore; 48 Eric Solis – Sophomore
Sources: 2011 Oregon Ducks Football Roster

== Coaching staff ==
Name	Position	Season at Oregon
Chip Kelly	Head coach	3rd
Mark Helfrich	Offensive coordinator	3rd
Nick Aliotti	Defensive coordinator	20th
Jerry Azzinaro	Defensive line	3rd
Gary Campbell	Running backs	29th
Scott Frost	Wide receivers and Passing game coordinator	3rd
Steve Greatwood	Offensive line	25th
John Neal	Defensive secondary	9th
Tom Osborne	Special teams and tight ends	11th
Don Pellum	Linebackers	22nd
Jim Radcliffe	Strength and conditioning	27th
Reference: Oregon Football Multi-Media Guide 2011

== Rankings ==
Ranking movements Legend: ██ Increase in ranking ██ Decrease in ranking ( ) = First-place votes
	Week															
Poll	Pre	1	2	3	4	5	6	7	8	9	10	11	12	13	14	Final
AP	3 (4)	13	12	10	9	9	9	9	7	6	6	4	9	8	6	4
Coaches	3 (2)	14	14	13	11	9	9	8	7	6	6	4	9	7	5	4
Harris	Not released						9	9	7	6	6	4	9	7	5	Not released
BCS	Not released							10	7	8	7	4	10	9	5	Not released
