= Gary Campbell (American football coach) =

American football player and coach (born 1951)

Biographical details
- Born: February 15, 1951 (age 75); Ennis, Texas, U.S.
- Education: UCLA

Playing career
- 1969–1973: UCLA
- Position: Fullback

Coaching career (HC unless noted)
- 1976–1978: UCLA (GA)
- 1979–1980: Southern (RB)
- 1981: Howard (RB)
- 1982: Pacific (RB)
- 1983–2016: Oregon (RB)

Gary Campbell (born February 15, 1951) is a former American football player and coach. He is the former running backs coach for the University of Oregon football team.

== Education and playing career ==
Campbell played college football as a fullback for UCLA from 1969 to 1973.

== Coaching career ==
=== 1,000-yard rushers ===
Campbell has coached 19 players to 1,000-rushing-yard seasons; three players have done it twice, and LaMichael James did it three times, despite being suspended for the first game of his sophomore year, and missing two games due to injury in his junior year. 2001 and 2008 mark seasons when Oregon had two 1,000 yard rushers in the same season.

Year	Player	GP	YPG	Yards	TD
1985	Tony Cherry	11	91.5	1,006	9
1988	Derek Loville	12	100.2	1,202	13
1995	Ricky Whittle	12	85.1	1,021	12
1997	Saladin McCullough	12	111.9	1,343	9
1999	Reuben Droughns	12	102.8	1,234	9
2000	Maurice Morris	12	99.0	1,188	8
2001	Maurice Morris 2nd	12	87.4	1,049	9
2001	Onterrio Smith	12	88.2	1,058	7
2002	Onterrio Smith 2nd	12	95.1	1,141	12
2004	Terrence Whitehead	12	97.2	1,166	6
2007	Jonathan Stewart	13	132.5	1,722	11
2008	Jeremiah Johnson	13	92.4	1,201	13
2008	LeGarrette Blount	13	77.1	1,002	17
2009	LaMichael James	13	118.9	1,546	14
2010	LaMichael James 2nd	12	144.3	1,731	**21**
2011	LaMichael James 3rd	11	**164.1**	1,805	18
2012	Kenjon Barner	13	135.9	1,767	**21**
2013	Byron Marshall	12	86.5	1,038	14
2014	Royce Freeman	15	91	1,365	18
2015	Royce Freeman 2nd	13	141.23	**1,836**	17

Bold denotes school record
†Season ongoing

=== Players in the NFL ===
Campbell has coached 11 players that went on to play in the NFL.

No.	Player	Rookie year	Round	Pick	Undrafted free agent	First Team	Current team
1	Derek Loville	1990	Not drafted		Yes	Seattle Seahawks	Retired
2	Dino Philyaw	1995	6	195	–	New England Patriots	Retired
3	Ricky Whittle	1996	4	103	–	New Orleans Saints	Retired
4	Reuben Droughns	2000	3	81	–	Detroit Lions	Retired
5	Maurice Morris	2002	2	54	–	Seattle Seahawks	Retired
6	Onterrio Smith	2003	4	105	–	Minnesota Vikings	Retired
7	Jonathan Stewart	2008	1	13	–	Carolina Panthers	
8	LeGarrette Blount	2010	Not drafted		Yes	Tennessee Titans	New England Patriots
9	LaMichael James	2012	2	61	–	San Francisco 49ers	Free Agent
10	Kenjon Barner	2013	6	182	–	Carolina Panthers	Philadelphia Eagles
11	De'Anthony Thomas	2014	4	124	–	Kansas City Chiefs	Baltimore Ravens
