= 2011 Pac-12 Football Championship Game =

- Conference Championship
UCLA Bruins	Oregon Ducks
(6–6)	(10–2)
31	49
Head coach: Rick Neuheisel	Head coach: Chip Kelly
AP / Coaches / BCS; NR / NR / NR	AP / Coaches / BCS; 8 / 7 / 9
	1	2	3	4	Total
UCLA	7	10	7	7	31
Oregon	21	14	14	0	49
- Date: December 2, 2011
- Season: 2011
- Stadium: Autzen Stadium
- Location: Eugene, Oregon
- MVP: RB LaMichael James, Oregon
- Favorite: Oregon by 31
- National anthem: Elijah Kelley
- Referee: Land Clark
- Attendance: 59,376

United States TV coverage
- Network: FOX
- Announcers: Gus Johnson play-by-play Charles Davis color Tim Brewster sideline

2011 Pac-12 Conference football standings
	Conf.			Overall
Team	W		L	W		L
North Division
No. 4 Oregon xy$	8	–	1	12	–	2
No. 7 Stanford x%	8	–	1	11	–	2
Washington	5	–	4	7	–	6
California	4	–	5	7	–	6
Oregon State	3	–	6	3	–	9
Washington State	2	–	7	4	–	8
South Division
No. 6 USC †	7	–	2	10	–	2
UCLA xy	5	–	4	6	–	8
Utah	4	–	5	8	–	5
Arizona State	4	–	5	6	–	7
Arizona	2	–	7	4	–	8
Colorado	2	–	7	3	–	10
Championship: Oregon 49, UCLA 31
$ – BCS representative as conference champion; % – BCS at-large representative; x – Division champion/co-champions; y – Championship game participant; † – USC ineligible for championship and postseason due to NCAA sanctions; Rankings from AP Poll

The 2011 Pac-12 Football Championship Game was played on Friday, December 2, 2011, at Autzen Stadium in Eugene, Oregon to determine the 2011 football champion of the Pac-12 Conference. The game featured the UCLA Bruins of the South Division against the Oregon Ducks of the North Division. It was the first football conference championship for the Pac-12 Conference, or any of its predecessors. The game took place at Oregon's Autzen Stadium, as the Ducks' conference record of 8–1 was better than UCLA's record of 5–4. The Ducks defeated the Bruins 49–31, and would earn a berth in the 2012 Rose Bowl. At the Rose Bowl Game, the Ducks defeated the Wisconsin Badgers 45–38 for the Rose Bowl Championship trophy.

UCLA was named South Division Champions and earned a berth in the game even though it only had the second best record in the South Division; while the South Division's best record belonged to USC (7–2), the Trojans were ineligible to participate in the game due to NCAA sanctions. Both Oregon and Stanford finished with identical 8–1 conference records in the North Division; however Oregon defeated Stanford during the season, giving them the berth in the championship game.

The three-hour-27-minute game started at 5:20 p.m. PST/6:20 p.m. MST and televised by Fox Sports. Oregon running back LaMichael James was the game MVP.

== Pregame buildup ==
- On November 28, 2011, UCLA Coach Rick Neuheisel was fired, but he was allowed to coach in the Championship game.

== Game summary ==
=== First quarter ===
UCLA received the ball to start the game, but running back Johnathan Franklin fumbled on the game's second play to allow Oregon to score first on a 30-yard by LaMichael James. UCLA then forced a fumble on a reception by Oregon running back De'Anthony Thomas, but were unable to capitalize on it. However, quarterback Darron Thomas then threw an interception which was returned by linebacker Patrick Larimore for a 35-yard score. The Ducks came right back to score on a 10-yard run by Darron Thomas and took advantage of Franklin's second fumble late in the quarter to score on a 7-yard reception by tight end Colt Lyerla.

=== Second quarter ===
The Bruins opened the second quarter with a 37-yard strike from Kevin Prince to receiver Nelson Rosario for their second touchdown of the game. The Ducks however added to their lead with a 3-yard touchdown run by James and a 25-yard reception by receiver Daryle Hawkins, which was set up by a fumble UCLA running back Derrick Coleman. With 11 seconds left in the half UCLA was able to drive downfield and make a 44-yard field goal to trail Oregon 35–17.

=== Third quarter ===
The first points of the second half were scored by Prince with a 1-yard run. However, the Ducks continued to pull away, scoring on a 5-yard run by James and a 22-yard touchdown reception by tight end David Paulson on back to back possessions.

=== Fourth quarter ===
Prince was briefly knocked out of the game during the second series of the quarter and was replaced by Richard Brehaut. However Brehaut then threw an interception for the Bruins' fourth turnover of the game. Prince returned to lead the Bruins on the longest scoring drive of the game, which culminated in a 19-yard touchdown reception to Rosario for the game's final score.

=== Scoring summary ===
Quarter	Time	Drive		Team	Scoring Information	Score	
Quarter	Time	Length	Time	Team	Scoring Information	UCLA	Oregon
1	13:13	4 plays, 39 yards	1:04	Oregon	LaMichael James 30-yard run, Alejandro Maldonado kick good	0	7
1	7:55	3 plays, 1 yard	0:43	UCLA	Patrick Larimore 35-yard interception return, Tyler Gonzalez kick good	7	7
1	6:29	5 plays, 58 yards	1:26	Oregon	Darron Thomas 10-yard run, Alejandro Maldonado kick good	7	14
1	0:59	8 plays, 52 yards	2:01	Oregon	Colt Lyerla 7-yard reception from Darron Thomas, Alejandro Maldonado kick good	7	21
2	12:22	7 plays, 74 yards	3:37	UCLA	Nelson Rosario 37-yard reception from Kevin Prince, Tyler Gonzalez kick good	14	21
2	8:27	10 plays, 73 yards	3:55	Oregon	LaMichael James 3–yard run, Alejandro Maldonado kick good	14	28
2	4:25	4 plays, 32 yards	1:00	Oregon	Daryle Hawkins 25-yard reception from Darron Thomas, Alejandro Maldonado kick good	14	35
2	0:00	1 play, 30 yards	0:11	UCLA	Tyler Gonzalez 44–yard field goal	17	35
3	12:10	4 plays, 43 yards	1:28	UCLA	Kevin Prince 1–yard run, Tyler Gonzalez kick good	24	35
3	9:57	6 plays, 46 yards	2:13	Oregon	LaMichael James 5–yard run, Alejandro Maldonado kick good	24	42
3	4:45	5 plays, 86 yards	2:20	Oregon	David Paulson 22-yard reception from Darron Thomas, Alejandro Maldonado kick good	24	49
4	1:51	15 plays, 94 yards	5:22	UCLA	Nelson Rosario 19-yard reception from Kevin Prince, Tyler Gonzalez kick good	31	49
Final Score						31	49

== Game notes ==
Oregon set several marks during the game:

- Running back LaMichael James became the first player in conference history to rush for 1,500 or more yards three times in a career. He tied LenDale White with second-most career rushing touchdowns in conference history at 52.
- Quarterback Darron Thomas set a school record for career touchdown passes with 63. He also became the first player in program history to throw for 30 touchdowns in two seasons.
- The game marked the 82nd consecutive sellout for an Oregon football game at Autzen Stadium, going back to 1999.

== See also ==
- List of Pac-12 Conference football champions
