= Killer Burger =

American restaurant chain

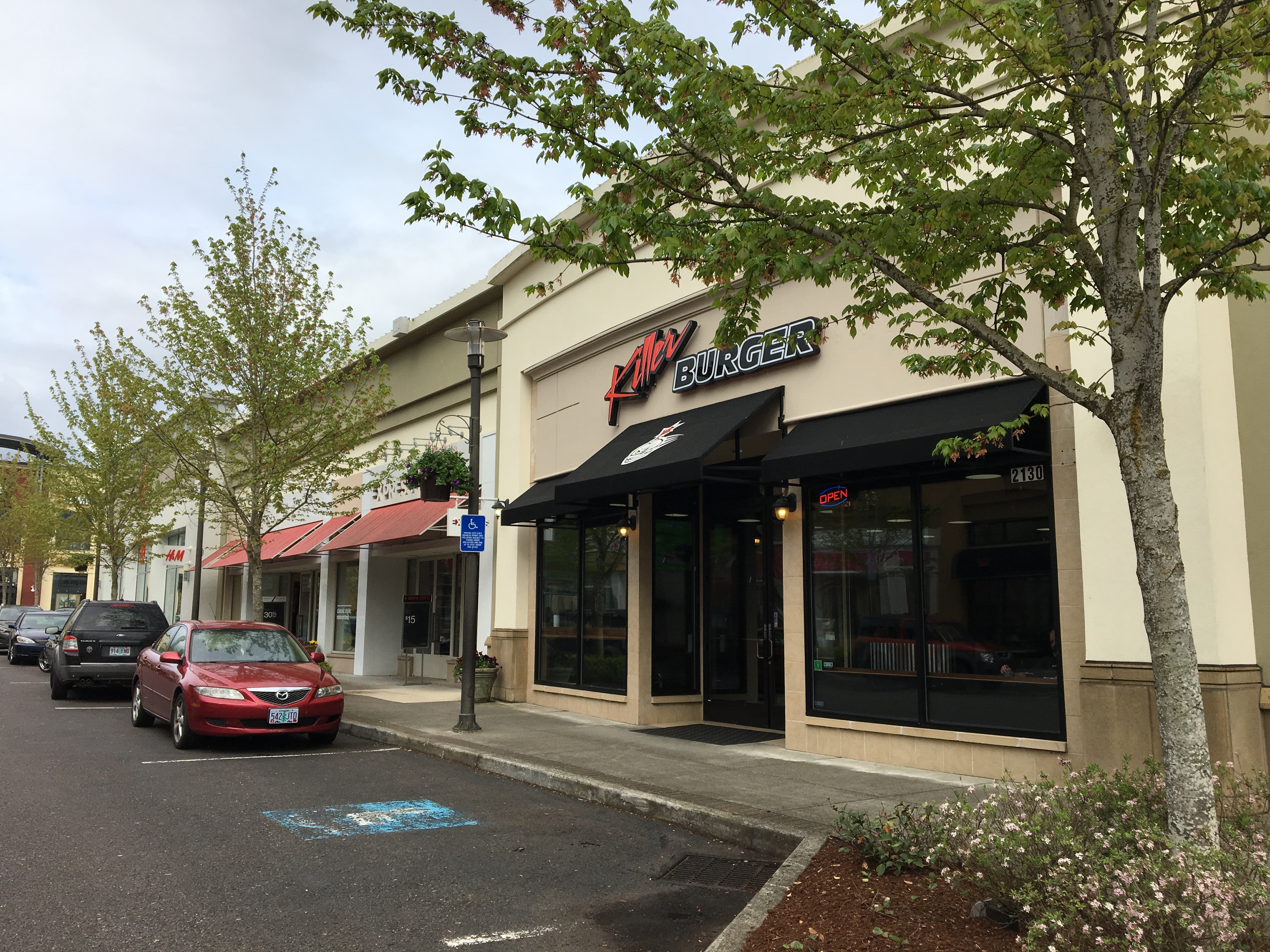
- Exterior of a Killer Burger restaurant in Hillsboro, Oregon, in 2017
- Industry: Restaurants
- Number of locations: 19
- Area served: Oregon, Washington and Idaho
- Website: killerburger.com

Killer Burger is an American restaurant chain.

== History ==
The company was founded by Thomas "TJ" Southard in Portland, Oregon. John Dikos is the chief executive officer.

There were 19 locations in the U.S. states of Oregon, Idaho, and Washington as of April 2022, including high-profile, non-traditional locations at Portland's Moda Center and Providence Park. There are three Killer Burger restaurants in Texas, as of 2026. The first two Texas restaurants opened in San Antonio, starting in 2024, and a Houston location opened in 2026.

LaMichael James, a former player in the National Football League and for the Oregon Ducks, owns three franchises, one in Lake Oswego, one in Eugene and another in Beaverton. The Killer Burger on NW 23rd in Portland closed in 2023.

== Reception ==
Killer Burger won in the Best Burger category and placed second in the Best Catering Service category of Willamette Week's annual 'Best of Portland' readers' poll in 2022. The business was a runner-up in the Best Burger category in 2024.

== See also ==
- List of hamburger restaurants
- List of restaurant chains in the United States
