= 2012 Rose Bowl =

American college football game

2012 Rose Bowl presented by Vizio
- 98th Rose Bowl Game
Wisconsin Badgers	Oregon Ducks
(11–2)	(11–2)
Big Ten	Pac-12
38	45
Head coach: Bret Bielema	Head coach: Chip Kelly
AP / Coaches / BCS; 9 / 8 / 10	AP / Coaches / BCS; 6 / 5 / 5
	1	2	3	4	Total
Wisconsin	14	14	10	0	38
Oregon	14	14	7	10	45
- Date: January 2, 2012
- Season: 2011
- Stadium: Rose Bowl
- Location: Pasadena, California
- MVP: Offensive: Lavasier Tuinei (WR, Oregon); Defensive: Kiko Alonso (MLB, Oregon)
- Favorite: Oregon by 6
- National anthem: Oregon Marching Band
- Referee: Brad Allen (Atlantic Coast Conference)
- Halftime show: Bands from participants
- Attendance: 91,245
- Payout: US$22.3 million per team

United States TV coverage
- Network: ESPN
- Announcers: Brent Musburger (play-by-play); Kirk Herbstreit (analyst); Erin Andrews (sideline)
- Nielsen ratings: 10.17 (11.7 million viewers)

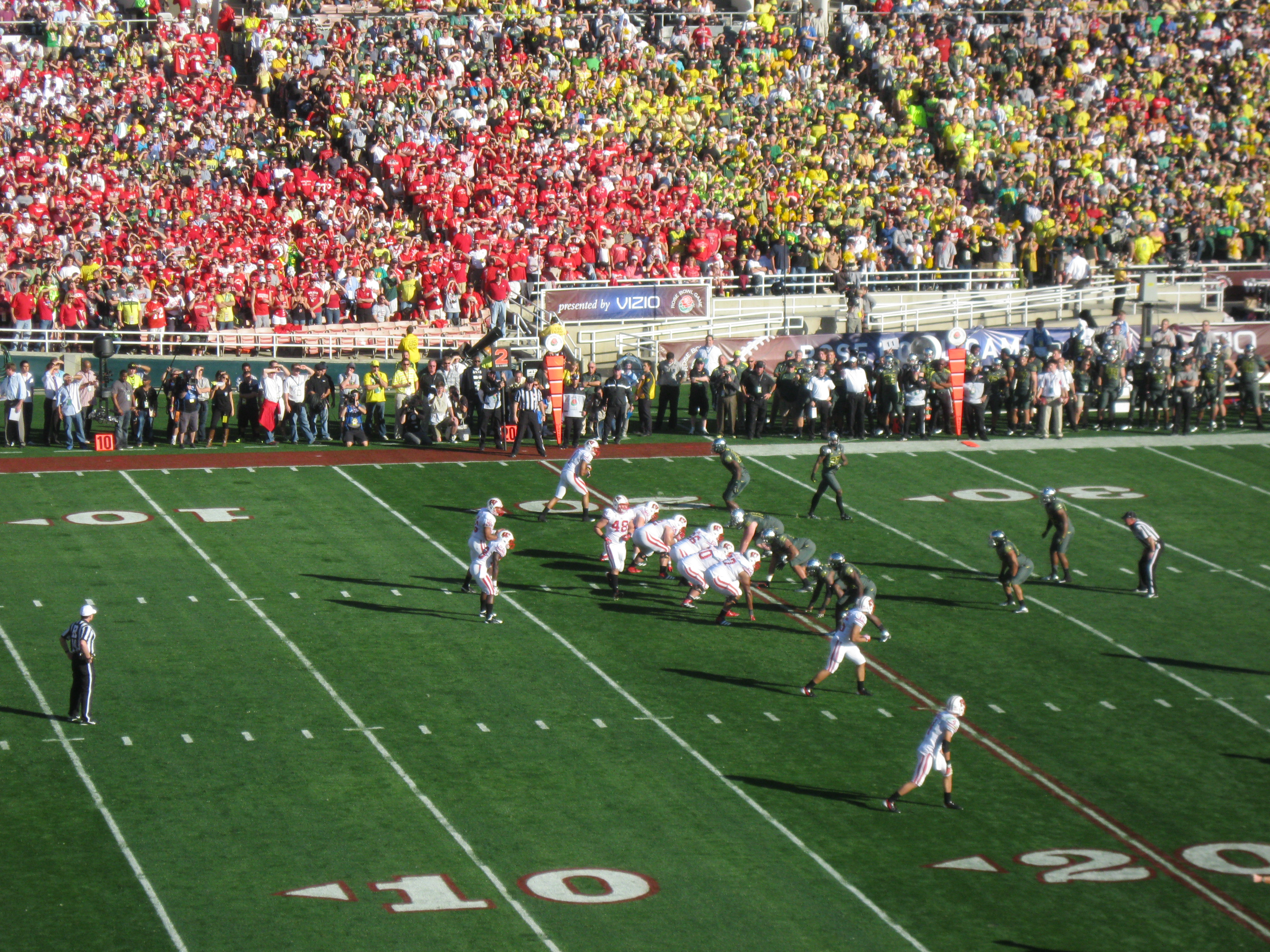
The 2012 Rose Bowl during the game

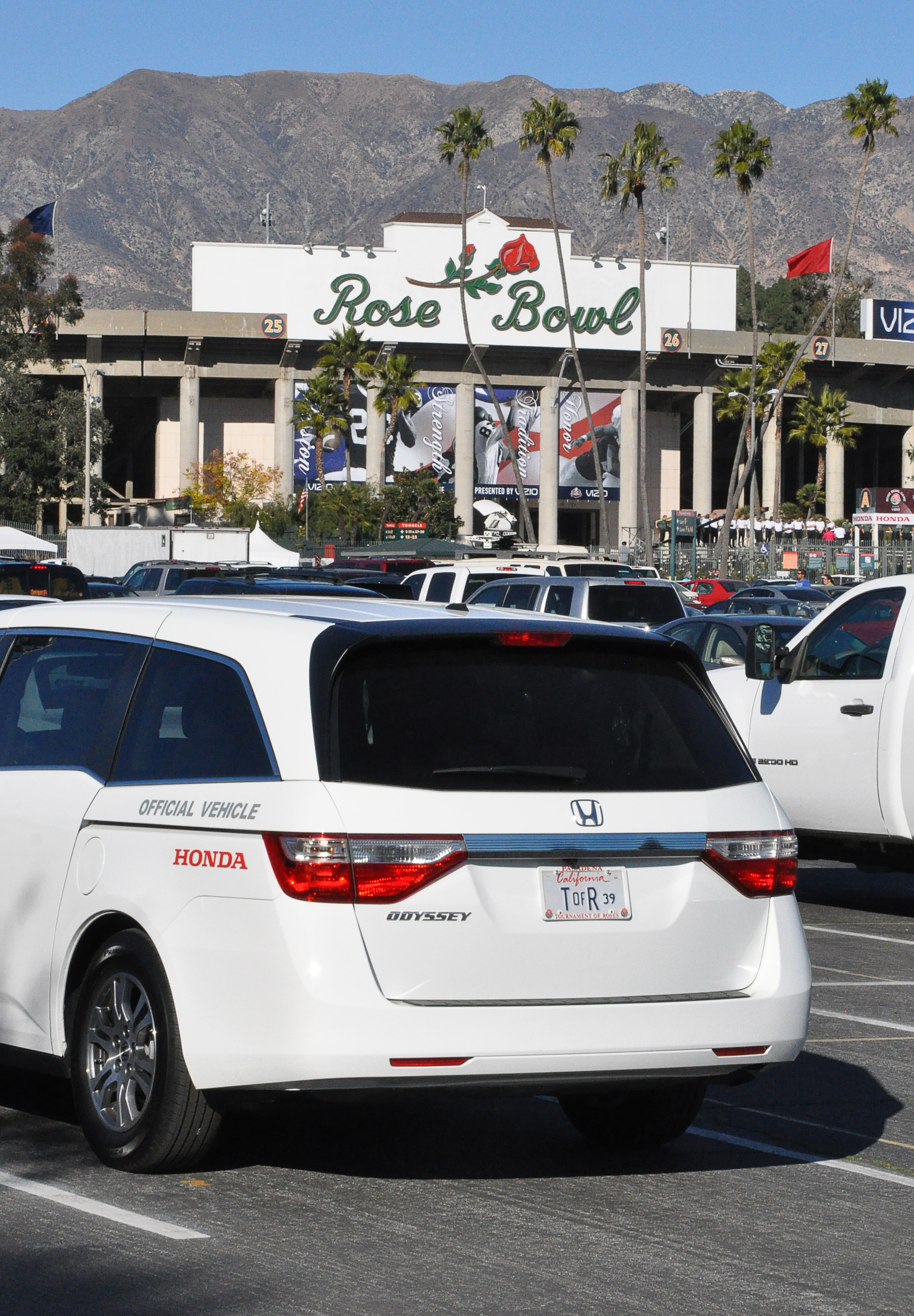
A Honda vehicle parked at the south entrance used by the Tournament of Roses Association during the 2012 Rose Bowl game

The 2012 Rose Bowl, the 98th edition of the annual game, was a college football bowl game played on Monday, January 2, 2012 at the same-named stadium in Pasadena, California. The Oregon Ducks of the Pac-12 Conference beat the Wisconsin Badgers of the Big Ten Conference, 45-38, for their first Rose Bowl win in 95 years.

The Pasadena Tournament of Roses Association was the organizer of the game and dedicated the game in honor of all wounded military personnel, who tossed the game coin by their representative Grand Marshal J.R. Martinez. Because of sponsorship by Vizio, the first game in the 2012 edition of the Bowl Championship Series was officially titled the Rose Bowl Game presented by Vizio. The contest was televised on ESPN with a radio broadcast on ESPN Radio and XM Satellite Radio, which began at 1:30 p.m. (PST) with kickoff at 2:10 p.m. (PST).

The Rose Bowl Game, themed Just Imagine ..., was a contractual sell-out, with 64,500 tickets allocated to the participating teams and conferences. The remaining tickets went to the Tournament of Roses members, sponsors, City of Pasadena residents, and the general public. On September 8, 2011, Executive Director P. Scott McKibben resigned for personal reasons. William B. Flinn, the Tournament’s longstanding chief operating officer, assumed the role of interim executive director.

== Pre-game activities ==
The game was presided over by the 2012 Royal Court and the Grand Marshal, J.R. Martinez. Members of the Royal Court are Queen Drew Helen Washington, Flintridge Sacred Heart Academy; Sarah Nicole Zuno, Benjamin Franklin High School; Cynthia Megan Louie, La Salle High School; Morgan Eliza Devaud, La Canada High School; Kimberly Victoria Ostiller, Flintridge Preparatory School; Hanan Bulto Worku, Pasadena High School, and Stephanie Grace Hynes, Maranatha High School.

After the teams' arrival in Southern California, the teams participated in the traditional Lawry's Beef Bowl in Beverly Hills and the Disney Media Day at Disneyland in nearby Anaheim. The Rose Bowl Hall of Fame ceremony luncheon was held on December 31, 2011 at the Pasadena Convention Center. The inductees were Ron Dayne, MVP of the 1999 and 2000 games from the University of Wisconsin; Dick Enberg, former NBC broadcaster; and George Fleming, the 1960 co-MVP (with Bob Schloredt, who was inducted in 1991) from the University of Washington.

The bands and cheerleaders from both schools participated in the early morning Rose Parade on Colorado Boulevard in Pasadena, California along with the floats, featuring stars and giant helmets, from the two conferences.

== Teams ==
Teams playing in the Rose Bowl game were the winners of the Pac-12 and Big Ten conference championship games, unless one team (or both teams) play in the BCS National Championship game. The teams were officially selected by the football committee of the Pasadena Tournament of Roses Association on Selection Sunday on December 4, 2011.

The Oregon Ducks, winners of the Pac-12 Championship game, represented the Pac-12 Conference, while the Wisconsin Badgers represented the Big Ten after winning the Big Ten Championship Game. Entering the game, the Badgers led the series 3–1 over the Ducks, winning in 1977, 1978 and 2000. In 2001, Oregon, coached by Mike Bellotti defeated Wisconsin 31–28 at Autzen Stadium in Eugene Oregon. Both teams had their pre-game practices at the Home Depot Center in Carson, California.

=== Oregon ===
The Ducks were led by LaMichael James in scoring with 19 touchdowns and 114 points in 11 games. Oregon was ranked 3rd in the nation in points scored (46.2 points per game) and 5th in rushing yards (295.7). Coming into the game, Oregon had held opponents to 23.6 points per game and allowed 243.5 yards in pass defense and 137.5 yards per game in rush defense. Combining the rushing yardage with the passing offense of 219.5 yards per game, the Ducks had a total offense of 515.2 yards per game.

=== Wisconsin ===
Wisconsin, winning 11 games and losing 2 during the season, had the best offense in the Big Ten, scoring 80 touchdowns, 7 field goals for a total of 580 points. Wisconsin was ranked 4th in the nation in scoring (44.6 points per game) and 10th in rushing yards (237.4). The Badgers had limited opponents to just 17 points per game, 155 yards in passing and 138 yards in rushing. The team had passed for 229.5 yards per game for a total offense of 466.9 yards in total offense. Russell Wilson broke the FBS record for overall passer rating in a season.

== Game notes ==
- The game was played on Monday due to the association's policy not to play on Sunday.
- Game ticket prices had increased to $175 for seats and $150 each for bench seats (end zones).
- Phase one of the Rose Bowl renovation was completed in 2011 with the addition of new video scoreboards and widening of south end tunnels.
- Oregon's victory was its first win in the Rose Bowl game since its participation in the 1917 Rose Bowl.
- The 83 points scored in this game broke the previous Rose Bowl record of 80 points which had stood for over twenty years (set in the 1991 Rose Bowl). Coincidentally, Wisconsin coach Bret Bielema participated in both of these record-setting games, having played for Iowa in the 1991 game. This record would be broken in the 2017 Rose Bowl where a total of 101 points were scored.

== Game Summary ==
=== Scoring summary ===
Scoring Play	Score
1st quarter
WIS – Jared Abbrederis 38 yd pass from Russell Wilson (Philip Welch kick), 11:48	WIS 7–0
ORE – LaMichael James 1 yd run (Alejandro Maldonado kick), 09:419	7–7
WIS – Russell Wilson 4 yd run (Philip Welch kick), 05:55	WIS 14–7
ORE – De'Anthony Thomas 91 yd run (Alejandro Maldonado kick), 00:00	14–14
2nd quarter
WIS – Montee Ball 3 yd run (Philip Welch kick), 10:52	WIS 21–14
ORE – Kenjon Barner 54 yd pass from Darron Thomas (Alejandro Maldonado kick), 10:36	21–21
WIS – Louis Nzegwu 33 yd fumble return (Philip Welch kick), 03:26	WIS 28–21
ORE – Lavasier Tuinei 3 yd pass from Darron Thomas (Alejandro Maldonado kick), 00:30	28–28
3rd quarter
ORE – De'Anthony Thomas 64 yd run (Alejandro Maldonado kick), 14:11	ORE 35–28
WIS – Philip Welch 29 yd field goal, 10:50	ORE 35–31
WIS – Nick Toon 18 yd pass from Russell Wilson (Philip Welch kick), 04:44	WIS 38–35
4th quarter
ORE – Lavasier Tuinei 11 yd pass from Darron Thomas (Alejandro Maldonado kick), 14:35	ORE 42–38
ORE – Alejandro Maldonado 30 yd field goal, 06:50	ORE 45–38

=== Statistics ===
Statistics	Wisconsin	Oregon
First downs	23	22
Total offense, plays – yards	72–508	64–621
Rushes-yards (net)	46–212	40–345
Passing yards (net)	296	276
Passes, completions-attempts-interceptions	19–26–1	18–24–1
Time of possession	35:42	24:18

== Records ==
- Most points scored in 1st half of the Rose Bowl (both teams): 56 points
- Longest rushing TD in the Rose Bowl: 91 yards by De'Anthony Thomas (Oregon)
- Most points scored in regulation in the Rose Bowl (Both teams): 83 points
- Most rushing TDs over 60 yards in the Rose Bowl: 2 by De'Anthony Thomas (Oregon)
- Most first downs in the Rose Bowl (both teams): 45
