= Josh Kaddu =

American football player (born 1990)

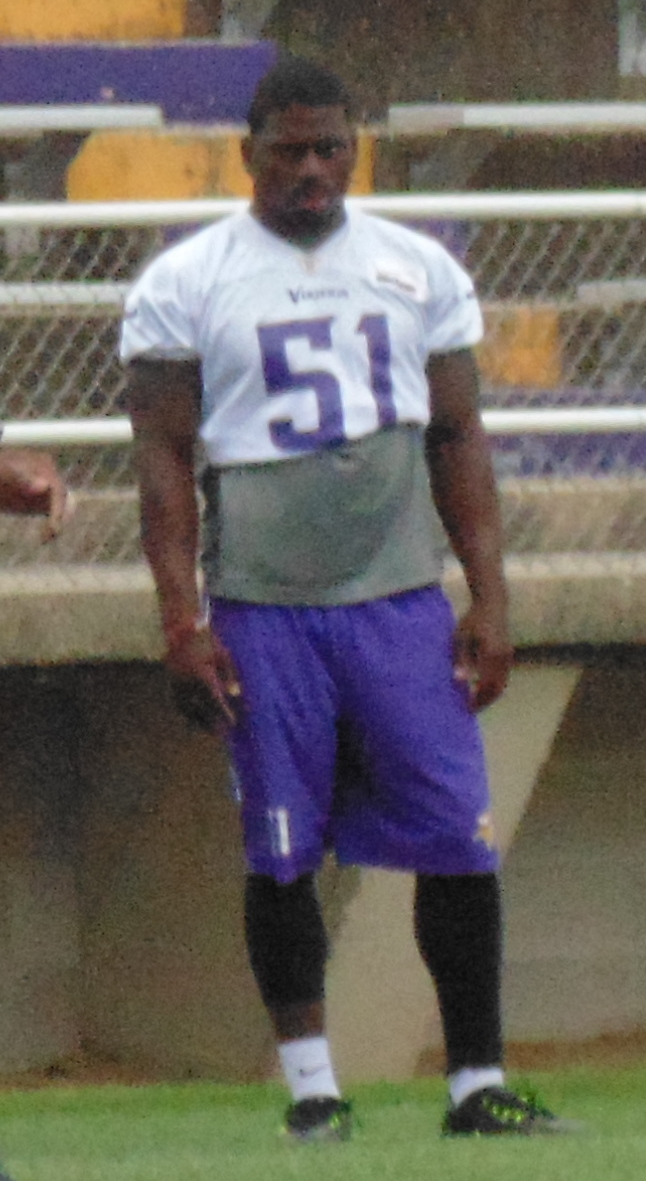
- Kaddu with the Minnesota Vikings in 2014

No. 57, 51
- Position: Linebacker

Personal information
- Born: March 12, 1990 (age 36); Richmond, California, U.S.
- Listed height: 6 ft 3 in (1.91 m)
- Listed weight: 239 lb (108 kg)

Career information
- High school: Vacaville (CA)
- College: Oregon
- NFL draft: 2012: 5th round, 155th overall pick

Career history
- Miami Dolphins (2012–2013); Philadelphia Eagles (2014)*; Minnesota Vikings (2014); BC Lions (2018)*
- * Offseason or practice squad member only

Awards and highlights
- First-team All-Pac-12 (2011)
- Stats at Pro Football Reference

Joshua Israel Kaddu (born March 12, 1990) is an American former professional football player who was a linebacker in the National Football League (NFL). He was selected by the Miami Dolphins in the fifth round of the 2012 NFL draft. Kaddu played college football for the Oregon Ducks.

== Early life ==
Kaddu earned letters in football, basketball and track at Vacaville High School. He finished his senior season ranked third in the Monticello Empire League in tackles with 92 stops (69 unassisted), 5.5 quarterback sacks (3rd in the league) and two interceptions, including a season-high 13 tackles vs. Vallejo. In addition, he also carried the ball 10 times for 78 yards and grabbed five catches for 155 yards and one touchdown on offense. He helped Mike Papadopoulos’ team take home the Sac-Joaquin Section Division I football championship in 2006 with a 37–36 victory against Merced, the school's first ever football title.

In track & field, Kaddu excelled in jumping events, posting bests of 1.83 meters (6–0) in the high jump, 6.41m (21–0) in the long jump and 13.58m (44–4) in the triple jump. He also competed in hurdles (15.49s in the 110m hurdles) and threw the shot put, posting a top-throw of 14.30 meters (46–10).

Ranked as a three-star recruit by Scout.com, Kaddu was ranked as the 33rd-best strongside linebacker prospect in the country and was included on its California Top 100 (99th) as one of the state's top recruits. He was also considered a two-star recruit by Rivals.com.

== Professional career ==
=== Miami Dolphins ===
Kaddu was selected by the Miami Dolphins in the fifth round of the 2012 NFL draft. He was the 155th overall selection and Miami's sixth pick. On October 21, 2013, Kaddu was released by the Dolphins.

=== Philadelphia Eagles ===
He was signed by the Philadelphia Eagles to a futures contract on January 7, 2014. He was released on August 30, 2014.

=== Minnesota Vikings ===
Kaddu signed with the Minnesota Vikings practice squad on September 9, 2014. On December 27, 2014, Kaddu was signed to the active roster when fellow linebacker Anthony Barr was placed on injured reserve. He was cut by the Vikings on August 31, 2015.

=== BC Lions ===
Kaddu signed with the BC Lions in March 2018.

== Personal life ==
Kaddu grew up in a city called Vacaville, located in the Northern San Francisco Bay Area. Kaddu is one of five siblings (Grace, Nakato, Babirye, Jonathan). Both Kaddu's mother and father are immigrants from Uganda. Before the Idi Amin era, Kaddu's father was a world recognized boxer.
