= Mark Asper =

American football player (born 1985)

No. 72, 62
- Position: Guard

Personal information
- Born: November 8, 1985 (age 40); Rexburg, Idaho, U.S.
- Listed height: 6 ft 6 in (1.98 m)
- Listed weight: 319 lb (145 kg)

Career information
- High school: Idaho Falls (ID) Bonneville
- College: Oregon
- NFL draft: 2012: 6th round, 178th overall pick

Career history
- Buffalo Bills (2012)*; Minnesota Vikings (2012); Jacksonville Jaguars (2012); Buffalo Bills (2013); New York Giants (2014)*; Denver Broncos (2014)*; Miami Dolphins (2014–2015)*; New England Patriots (2015)*
- * Offseason or practice squad member only

Career NFL statistics
- Games played: 7
- Stats at Pro Football Reference

Mark Vaughn Asper (born November 8, 1985) is an American former professional football player who was a guard in the National Football League (NFL). He was selected in the sixth round, 178th overall, by the Buffalo Bills in the 2012 NFL draft. He played college football for the Oregon Ducks. He was also a member of the Minnesota Vikings, Jacksonville Jaguars, New York Giants, Denver Broncos, Miami Dolphins, and the New England Patriots

== Professional career ==
Projected as a seventh round selection by Sports Illustrated, Asper was ranked as the No. 18 offensive tackle available in the 2012 NFL draft. SI noted his "limited upside in the NFL" and labeled him "as an inexpensive utility lineman".

He was cut by the Bills on August 31, 2012, and subsequently claimed off waivers by the Minnesota Vikings on September 1, 2012.

Asper was claimed off waivers from the Vikings by the Jacksonville Jaguars on December 24, 2012. He was released by the Jaguars on August 25, 2013.

On September 1, 2013, he was signed to the practice squad of the Buffalo Bills.

On July 29, 2014, Asper was signed as a free-agent by the New York Giants. On September 22, 2014, Asper was waived off the practice squad for Eric Herman.

On December 17, 2014, he was signed by the Miami Dolphins to their practice squad.

On August 6, 2015, he signed with the New England Patriots. The Patriots released Asper on August 27, 2015.

== Personal life ==
Asper is a member of the Church of Jesus Christ of Latter-day Saints.
