= LaMichael James =

American football player (born 1989)

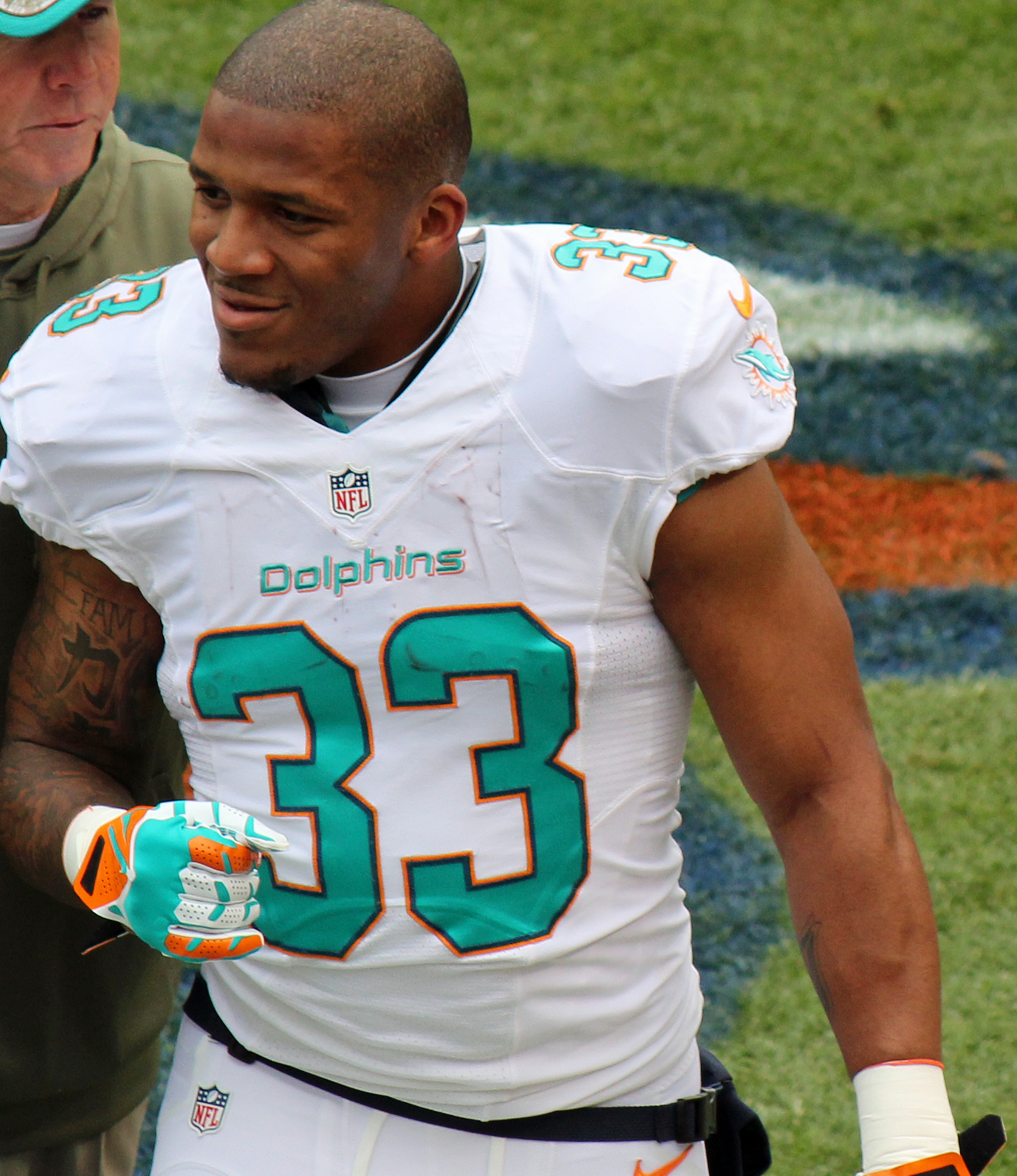
- James with the Miami Dolphins in 2014

No. 23, 33, 27
- Position: Running back

Personal information
- Born: October 22, 1989 (age 37); New Boston, Texas, U.S.
- Listed height: 5 ft 8 in (1.73 m)
- Listed weight: 200 lb (91 kg)

Career information
- High school: Liberty-Eylau (Texarkana, Texas)
- College: Oregon (2008–2011)
- NFL draft: 2012: 2nd round, 61st overall pick

Career history
- San Francisco 49ers (2012–2013); Miami Dolphins (2014–2015)

Awards and highlights
- Doak Walker Award (2010); Jim Brown Trophy (2010); Unanimous All-American (2010); First-team All-American (2011); Third-team All-American (2009); 2× First-team All-Pac-10/Pac-12 (2010, 2011); Pac-10 Offensive Freshman of the Year (2009)

Career NFL statistics
- Rushing yards: 193
- Rushing average: 4.4
- Receiving yards: 45
- Return yards: 1,043
- Total touchdowns: 0
- Stats at Pro Football Reference
- College Football Hall of Fame

LaMichael Keondrae "LaMike" James (born October 22, 1989) is an American former professional football player who was a running back in the National Football League (NFL). He played college football for the Oregon Ducks and was selected by the San Francisco 49ers in the second round of the 2012 NFL draft. James also played for the Miami Dolphins.

The 2010 season was a breakout one for James, as he rushed for 1,731 yards, the highest in the nation. James finished third in balloting for the Heisman Trophy that year and received the Doak Walker Award. In 2011, he became Oregon's career rushing leader and rushed for a school-record 1,805 yards. James was considered to be one of the top running backs throughout his college career, with his 5,082 total rushing yards placing him second in Pac-12 Conference history and 14th in NCAA history.

== Early life ==
James attended Liberty-Eylau High School in Texarkana, Texas, where he played running back. As a sophomore, James had 76 carries for 643 yards and 10 touchdowns. As a junior, he had 229 carries for 1,600 yards and 16 touchdowns to go along with 33 receptions for 500 yards and three touchdowns. James continued his dominance during his senior campaign to the tune of 2,043 yards and 24 touchdowns on 230 touches, averaging 8.9 yards per carry.

Considered a four-star recruit by Rivals.com, James was listed as the No. 12 all-purpose back in the nation in 2008.

== College career ==
=== 2009 season ===
James attended the University of Oregon, where he played for coach Chip Kelly's Oregon Ducks football team from 2009 to 2011. After the suspension of LeGarrette Blount, James became the starting running back for the Ducks in 2009. He helped the Ducks to upset victories over Utah and California with 152 and 118 rushing yards, respectively. James again rushed for over 100 yards on October 10 against UCLA with 152 yards on 20 carries.

Once again, James eclipsed the 100 yard mark with 154 yards rushing on 15 carries against Washington on October 24, and on October 31 with 183 yards to upset then #5 USC. He led all BCS-conference running backs with 6.9 yards per carry.

On December 7, 2009, James was named Pac-10 Offensive Freshman of the Year.

=== 2010 season ===
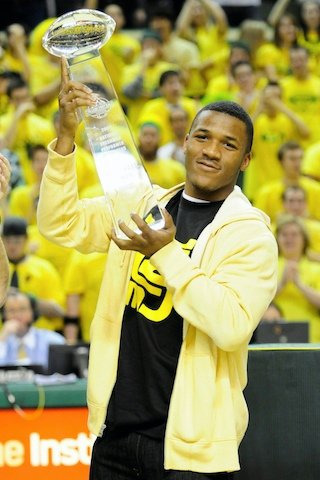
James in 2010

On March 9, 2010, head coach Chip Kelly announced that James would be suspended for the season opening game of the 2010 season, following his guilty plea for physical harassment against his former girlfriend.

Against Portland State, James rushed 14 times for 227 yards and two touchdowns in a 69–0 shutout win, the Ducks' second shutout on the year. The following week against Arizona State, he was held to only 94 rushing yards, but the total was enough to move James past the 2,000-yard mark for his career. Against the Arizona Wildcats, James rushed for 126 yards and two touchdowns while surpassing LeGarrette Blount's single season scoring record. James had a season high against the Stanford Cardinal by garnering 31 carries for 257 yards and three touchdowns. Over the course of the season, James had eclipsed the century mark nine times, only failing to reach 100 yards twice. James has had 18 100+ rushing yard games in his career, a record at the University of Oregon.

Despite missing the first game of the 2010 season due to suspension, James managed to break the Pac-10 all-time sophomore single season rushing record and led the country in both rushing yards (1,682) and touchdowns (22), ultimately earning a trip to the annual Heisman Ceremony in New York as a finalist. Following the 2010 season, James received the Doak Walker award, given to best running back in the country, and was recognized as a unanimous first-team All-American. He was also a Pac-12 All-Academic selection. The Ducks finished regular season play undefeated (12-0) and ranked No. 2 in both the BCS and the AP poll. They played the top-ranked Auburn Tigers in the 2011 BCS National Championship Game in Glendale, Arizona. In that game, James had two touchdown receptions, including one that set up the game-tying two-point conversion. Nevertheless, James' season ended with disappointment when Auburn kicked a game-winning field goal as time expired for a 22–19 victory.

=== 2011 season ===
In the first game of the 2011 season against LSU, James became Oregon's career rushing leader, surpassing the mark previously set by Derek Loville. In the third game of the season against Missouri State, James ran for 204 yards and three touchdowns, which was his fourth career 200+ yard rushing game. On September 24 in a game against Arizona, James rushed for an Oregon single game record of 288 yards on 24 carries.

On October 6, 2011, in a game against California, James fell awkwardly on his right arm and left with an air cast. After the game, it was announced that X-rays were negative for a break and that James had suffered a dislocated elbow but popped it back into place before leaving the field. During the postgame interview, James' health for the next game came into question. James' response to questions about his health was: "I could tear all of my ACLs and I'll still play."

On December 2, 2011, James won the Pac-12 Championship Game MVP, while rushing for three touchdowns. On January 2, 2012, James rushed 25 times for 159 yards and a touchdown to help Oregon beat Wisconsin 45–38 in the Rose Bowl. In an interview with John Canzano of The Oregonian, James said of former Oregon Running Back coach Garry Campbell, "He’s authentic. When you have somebody that authentic, he’s not always going to tell you what you want to hear but he’s going to tell you what you need to hear...he’s a wonderful man on and off the field."

=== Track and field ===
James ran track while still in high school, winning the 2006 Texas 100-meter championship in 10.51 seconds. He was also the state runner-up in the 4x100 meter (42.28) and 4x400 meter (3:23.31) relay teams. James was also a track & field star at the University of Oregon. Despite limited workouts with school's track team, he placed 5th in the 2010 Pac-10 championships at the 100 meters, posting a personal-best time of 10.50 seconds in the semifinals. James anchored 4x100 relay to 4th place and ran a personal-best time of 6.77 seconds in the 60 meters at the 2010 Washington Husky Invitational, placing third in the finals.

== Professional career ==
Pre-draft measurables
Height	Weight	Arm length	Hand span	Wingspan	40-yard dash	10-yard split	20-yard split	20-yard shuttle	Three-cone drill	Vertical jump	Broad jump	Bench press
5 ft 8 in (1.73 m)	194 lb (88 kg)	30 1/4 in (0.77 m)	9 in (0.23 m)	5 ft 11 1/4 in (1.81 m)	4.41 s	1.53 s	2.57 s	4.12 s	6.88 s	35.0 in (0.89 m)	10 ft 3 in (3.12 m)	15 reps
All values from NFL Combine/Pro Day

=== San Francisco 49ers ===
James was selected in the second round (61st overall) by the San Francisco 49ers in the 2012 NFL draft.

As a rookie, James played in his first career regular-season game against the Miami Dolphins in Week 14. James finished the 27–13 victory with eight carries for 30 yards along with a 15-yard reception. In the next game against the New England Patriots, he had eight carries for 31 yards along with a 62-yard kickoff return after the Patriots had completed a 28-point comeback to tie the game 31–31, leading to a touchdown the next play for the 49ers. The 49ers won the game on the road by a score of 41–34. In the NFC Championship Game against the Atlanta Falcons, James rushed five times for 34 yards and scored his first NFL touchdown on a 15-yard rush as the 49ers won on the road by a score of 28–24 and reached Super Bowl XLVII. In the game, James rushed three times for 10 yards but lost a fumble as the 49ers narrowly lost to the Baltimore Ravens by a score of 34–31.

=== Miami Dolphins ===
James was signed to the Miami Dolphins practice squad on September 30, 2014. He was promoted to the active roster on November 10, after a season-ending injury to left tackle Branden Albert.

James was re-signed by the Dolphins on March 20, 2015. Prior to the 2015 season, he informed the media that he preferred to be addressed as "LaMike", stating his friends, family and teammates have always called him that. James was waived by the Dolphins on September 14.

== Career statistics ==
=== NFL ===
==== Regular season ====
Year	Team	Games		Rushing					Receiving					Returning					Fumbles	
Year	Team	GP	GS	Att	Yds	Avg	Lng	TD	Rec	Yds	Avg	Lng	TD	Ret	Yds	Avg	Lng	TD	Fum	Lost
2012	SF	4	0	27	125	4.6	26	0	3	29	9.7	15	0	14	417	29.8	62	0	1	0
2013	SF	10	0	12	59	4.9	21	0	2	16	8.0	12	0	35	572	16.3	41	0	3	0
2014	SF	2	0	3	9	3.0	5	0	0	0	0.0	0	0	0	0	0.0	0	0	0	0
2014	MIA	1	0	2	0	0.0	0	0	0	0	0.0	0	0	0	0	0.0	0	0	0	0
2015	MIA	1	0	1	0	0.0	0	0	0	0	0.0	0	0	2	54	27.0	29	0	1	0
Career		18	0	44	193	4.4	26	0	5	45	9.0	15	0	26	1,043	20.5	62	0	5	0

==== Postseason ====
Year	Team	Games		Rushing					Receiving					Returning					Fumbles	
Year	Team	GP	GS	Att	Yds	Avg	Lng	TD	Rec	Yds	Avg	Lng	TD	Ret	Yds	Avg	Lng	TD	Fum	Lost
2012	SF	3	0	11	65	5.9	15T	1	2	11	5.5	7	0	7	162	23.1	28	0	1	1
2013	SF	3	0	1	0	0.0	0	0	0	0	0.0	0	0	10	190	19.0	37	0	1	0
Career		6	0	12	65	5.4	15T	1	2	11	5.5	7	0	17	352	20.7	37	0	2	1

=== College ===
Year	Team	GP	Rushing						Receiving			
Year	Team	GP	Att	Yds	Avg	100+	Lng	TD	Rec	Yds	Avg	TD
2009	Oregon	13	230	1,546	6.7	9	60	14	17	168	9.9	0
2010	Oregon	12	294	1,731	5.9	9	76	21	17	208	12.2	3
2011	Oregon	12	247	1,805	7.3	8	90	18	17	210	12.4	1
Career		37	771	5,082	6.6	26	90	53	51	586	11.5	4

== Awards and honors ==
- 2010 Doak Walker Award
- 2010 Heisman Trophy finalist (3rd)
- 2010 Premier Player of College Football Trophy finalist (3rd)
- 2010 AFCA All-American
- 2010 First-team AP All-American
- 2010 FWAA All-American
- 2010 WCFF All-American
- 2010 First-team All-Pac-10
- 2010 Pac-10 First-team All-Academic
- 2009 CFPA National Freshman Performer of the Year
- 2009 Pac-10 Offensive Freshman of the Year
- 2009 Sporting News Third-team All-American
- 2009 AP Third-team All-American
- 2009 Rivals.com Second-team All-MLG team
- Pac-10 Offensive Player of the Week, twice (October 31, 2009,

== Personal life ==
James was born in New Boston, Texas to Rosemary James. He was raised by his maternal grandmother, Betty James, in Texarkana, Texas. She died of cancer when James was 17 years old, so he had to live by himself during his junior and senior years of high school.

== Post-football life ==
James turned himself into a restaurant franchise owner after his NFL playing days ended. As of 2024, James owned three Killer Burger stores in the state of Oregon, one located in Beaverton, one in Lake Oswego, and the newest in the same city as his alma mater, Eugene.

== See also ==
- List of Division I FBS rushing touchdown leaders
- List of college football yearly rushing leaders
