= David Paulson =

American football player (born 1989)

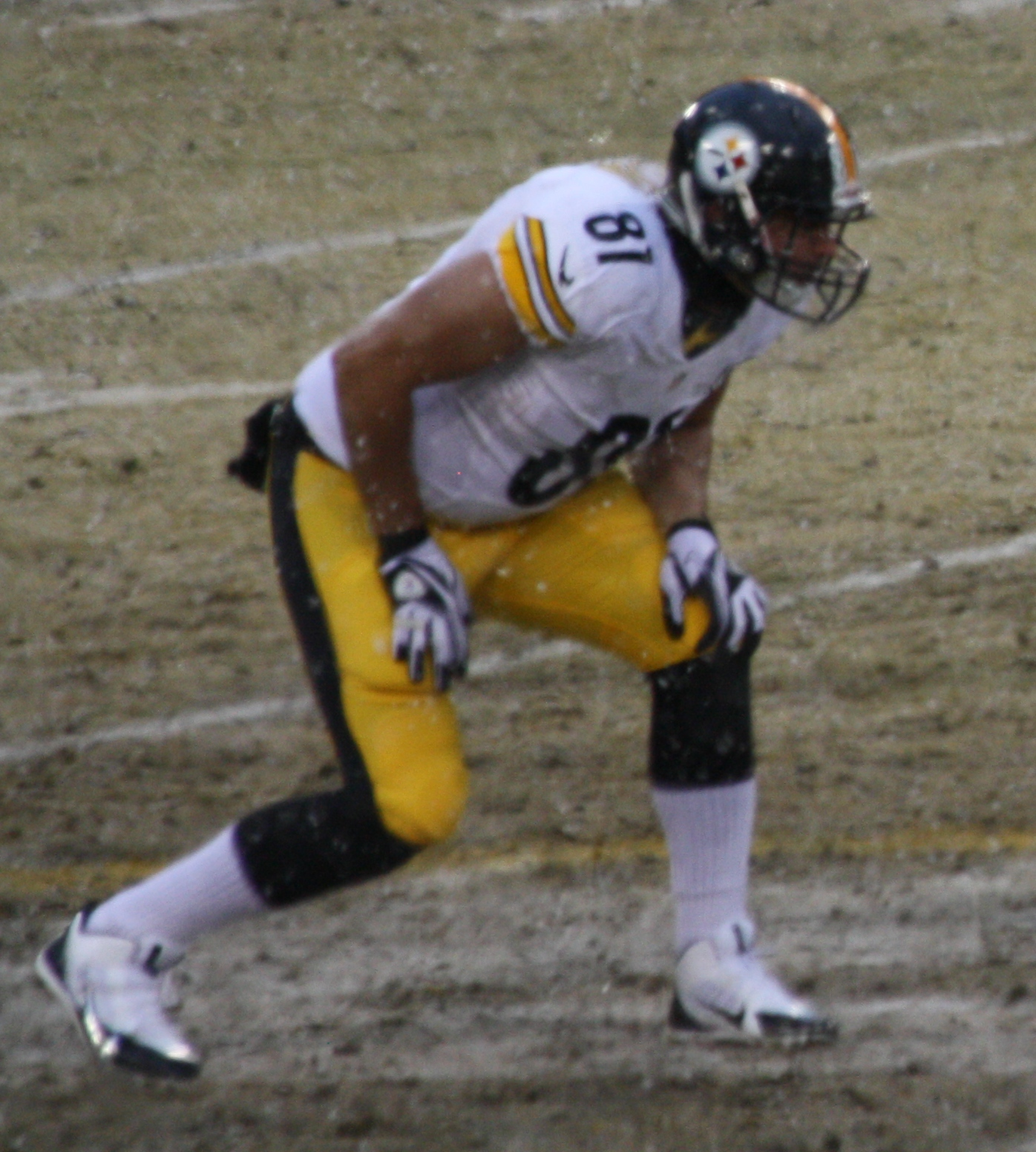
- Paulson with the Pittsburgh Steelers in 2013

No. 81
- Position: Tight end

Personal information
- Born: February 22, 1989 (age 37); Renton, Washington, U.S.
- Listed height: 6 ft 4 in (1.93 m)
- Listed weight: 246 lb (112 kg)

Career information
- High school: Auburn Riverside (WA)
- College: Oregon
- NFL draft: 2012: 7th round, 240th overall pick

Career history
- Pittsburgh Steelers (2012–2013); San Diego Chargers (2014–2015)*
- * Offseason or practice squad member only

Awards and highlights
- First-team All-Pac-10 (2010); Second-team All-Pac-12 (2011)

Career NFL statistics
- Receptions: 13
- Receiving yards: 153
- Stats at Pro Football Reference

David Joshua Paulson (born February 22, 1989) is an American former professional football player who was a tight end in the National Football League (NFL). He was selected in the seventh round, 240th overall, by the Pittsburgh Steelers in the 2012 NFL draft. He played college football for the Oregon Ducks.

== Professional career ==
=== Pittsburgh Steelers ===
Paulson was released by the Steelers on August 30, 2014, for final roster cuts before the start of the 2014 season.

=== San Diego Chargers ===
On November 27, 2014, Paulson was signed to the practice squad of the San Diego Chargers.
