= De'Anthony Thomas =

American football player (born 1993)

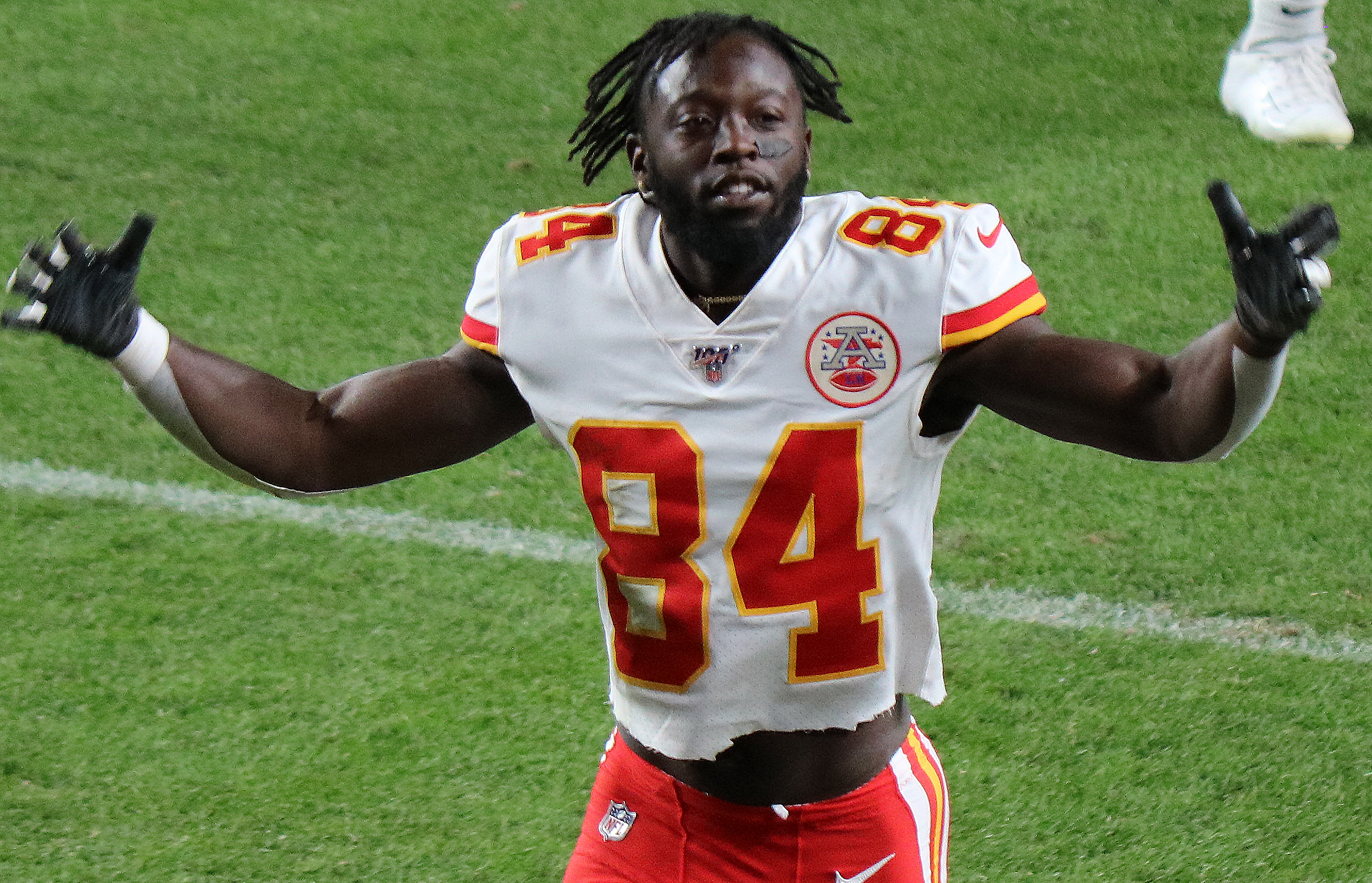
- Thomas with the Kansas City Chiefs in 2019

No. 13, 84, 16
- Positions: Wide receiver, return specialist

Personal information
- Born: January 5, 1993 (age 33); Los Angeles, California, U.S.
- Listed height: 5 ft 8 in (1.73 m)
- Listed weight: 176 lb (80 kg)

Career information
- High school: Crenshaw (Los Angeles)
- College: Oregon (2011–2013)
- NFL draft: 2014: 4th round, 124th overall pick

Career history
- Kansas City Chiefs (2014–2019); Baltimore Ravens (2019–2020); BC Lions (2022)*
- * Offseason or practice squad member only

Awards and highlights
- PFWA All-Rookie Team (2014); Pac-12 Co-Offensive Freshman of the Year (2011); First-team All-Pac-12 (2011)

Career NFL statistics
- Rushing attempts: 31
- Rushing yards: 191
- Receptions: 65
- Receiving yards: 509
- Return yards: 2,436
- Total touchdowns: 7
- Stats at Pro Football Reference

De'Anthony Marquies Thomas (born January 5, 1993) is an American former professional football player who was a wide receiver and return specialist in the National Football League (NFL). He played college football for the Oregon Ducks and was selected by the Kansas City Chiefs in the fourth round of the 2014 NFL draft. He also played for the Baltimore Ravens. As a freshman at Oregon, he was a co-recipient of the 2011 CFPA Kickoff Returner Trophy and was named Pac-12 Co-Offensive Freshman of the Year.

== Early life ==
When Thomas was 12 years old, he was a Pop Warner Football star and played for the Crenshaw Bears in Snoop Dogg's Snoop Youth Football League. Snoop Dogg claims to have given Thomas the nickname "Black Mamba", though Sports Illustrated has written that another coach in the league first identified Thomas to Snoop Dogg as the "Black Mamba". Thomas himself prefers the spelling "Black Momba".

Thomas graduated from Crenshaw High School in Los Angeles, California, where he played running back, defensive back, and wide receiver under the leadership of coach Robert Garrett. Thomas rushed for 1,299 yards and 18 touchdowns on offense and collected five interceptions on defense while leading Crenshaw (12–2) to its second straight city championship. Regarded as a five-star recruit by Rivals.com, Thomas was listed as the No. 1 athlete prospect in the class of 2011. He played in the 2011 U.S. Army All-American Bowl.

Thomas was also a track sprinter, named a 2013 NCAA Division I All-American as anchor of Oregon's 4 × 100 relay team. He has a personal best of 10.25 seconds in the 100 meters and 20.39 seconds in the 200 meters. In high school, he won the Los Angeles City Section Championship in the 100 m in 2009, and went on to finish 6th in the 100 m and 2nd in the 200 m at the California state meet. In 2010, he won the LACS championship in both the 100 m and 200 m, but at the California state meet failed to move past the preliminary rounds in the 100 m and finished last in the 200 m final.

Recruiting

College recruiting
Name	Hometown	School	Height	Weight	40^{‡}	Commit date
De'Anthony Thomas; RB	Los Angeles, CA	Crenshaw	5 ft 9 in (1.75 m)	160 lb (73 kg)	4.35	Feb 2, 2011
De'Anthony Thomas; RB	Recruit ratings: Scout: Rivals: (84)					
Overall recruit ranking: Scout: 1 (ATH) Rivals: 1 (CB) ESPN: 1 (ATH)
‡ Refers to 40-yard dash; Note: In many cases, Scout, Rivals, 247Sports, On3, and ESPN may conflict in their listings of height, weight and 40 time.; In these cases, the average was taken. ESPN grades are on a 100-point scale.; Sources: "2011 Oregon Football Commitments". Rivals.; "2011 Oregon Football Commits". Scout.; "ESPN". ESPN.; "Scout.com Team Recruiting Rankings". Scout.; "2011 Team Ranking". Rivals.com.

== College career ==
Thomas was one of the most decorated prep football players to ever come out of Los Angeles and one of the most sought after recruits of the 2011 recruiting class. It came as a shock when Thomas announced his decision to attend the University of Oregon over USC, which was 10 minutes from where he lived. Coming out of high school, he was the #1 rated defensive back in the 2011 recruiting class but his desire to play offense in college grew over his senior season at Crenshaw High School. On January 29, 2011, Thomas secretly visited Oregon on a recruiting trip and decided to play for the Ducks in Chip Kelly's blur offense.

=== 2011 ===
Thomas had a standout 2011 season as a true freshman for Oregon. Splitting time between running back and wide receiver, as well as returning kickoffs and punts, Thomas amassed 2,235 all-purpose yards and scored 18 total touchdowns, setting a school record for number of touchdowns by a freshman. Thomas was the only player in the 2011 college football year to amass 400 yards each in rushing, receiving, and returns. He was a co-recipient of the 2011 CFPA Kickoff Returner Trophy and a freshman All-American selection. He led all freshmen with 18 touchdowns.

On January 2, 2012, Thomas recorded two touchdowns and 314 all-purpose yards in the Rose Bowl where Oregon won 45–38 over #10 Wisconsin. In that game, his 91-yard touchdown run broke the previous Rose Bowl record for the longest run from scrimmage. His only other carry in that game resulted in a 64-yard score, giving him 155 rushing yards on just two carries.

The Ducks finished the season 12–2 (8–1 Pac-12) with a #4 final season ranking. He was on many Heisman watch lists ahead of the 2012 season.

=== 2012 ===
In 2012, Thomas continued his role as an all-purpose weapon for the Ducks. He amassed 701 yards rushing, for 11 touchdowns, and another 445 yards receiving, for 5 touchdowns. Thomas continued to return kicks and punts, including a 94-yard opening kickoff return in the 2013 Fiesta Bowl, where Oregon defeated #5 Kansas State 35–17. In total, he recorded 1,757 all-purpose yards and scored 18 touchdowns. Thomas led the Pac-12 conference in rushing yards per attempt with 7.6. The Ducks finished the season 12–1 (8–1 Pac-12) with a #2 ranking, putting them in the top five of the final season rankings for the third straight season.

Thomas was featured on the cover of Sports Illustrated on September 24, 2012. The headline inside read: "Can't Touch DAT: He's not a RB, a receiver or even a starter, UO's DAT is simply a touchdown waiting to happen."

=== 2013 ===
Entering his junior year, Thomas was a candidate for the Paul Hornung Award, as well as being placed on watchlists for the Doak Walker Award and Heisman Trophy. On September 9, 2013, he was named the Pac-12 offensive player of the week after tying a career-best with three touchdowns (all rushing) at Virginia. For the season he had a combined eight rushing and one receiving touchdown.

On January 5, 2014, Thomas announced he would forgo his senior season and enter the 2014 NFL draft.

=== Awards and honors ===
2011

- Pac-12 Co-Offensive Freshman of the Year
- Team's Most Outstanding Player Award
- All-Pac-12 First-team (Pac-12 Coaches, Phil Steele)
- Freshman All-America (Sporting News)
- All-Freshman First-team (Phil Steele)
- CFPA Kick Returner Performer of the Week (Washington State, USC)

2012

- 2nd Team All-America (FOXSportsNEXT.com)
- Maxwell Award Semifinalist (College Player of the Year)
- Pac-12 All-Conference Honorable Mention (Pac-12 Coaches)

2013

- Pac-12 Offensive Player of the Week (Pac-12 Coaches) Sep 9

== Professional career ==
Pre-draft measurables
Height	Weight	Arm length	Hand span	40-yard dash	10-yard split	20-yard split	20-yard shuttle	Three-cone drill	Vertical jump	Broad jump	Bench press	Wonderlic
5 ft 8 5/8 in (1.74 m)	174 lb (79 kg)	29 7/8 in (0.76 m)	8 1/8 in (0.21 m)	4.50 s	1.63 s	2.51 s	4.23 s	6.94 s	32.5 in (0.83 m)	10 ft 4 in (3.15 m)	9 reps	14
All values from NFL Combine/Pro Day

=== Kansas City Chiefs ===
==== 2014 season ====
Thomas was selected by the Kansas City Chiefs in the fourth round (124th overall) of the 2014 NFL draft. On August 7, 2014, Thomas returned a punt 80 yards for a touchdown in the Chiefs' first preseason game. After being drafted, Thomas was expected to play a wide receiver and running back hybrid position in the offense, as well as being the punt returner, similar to the way Dexter McCluster had been used in previous seasons before leaving the team in the offseason. In the 2014 NFL season, Thomas rushed 14 times for 113 yards, and one touchdown, as well as catching 23 passes for 156 yards. In addition to that he returned a punt for 81 yards and a touchdown against the Oakland Raiders on December 14. He ended the season with 405 punt return yards off of 34 attempts. He was also the Chiefs main kick returner, he returned 14 kicks for 428 yards. He was named to the PFWA All-Rookie Team.

==== 2015 season ====
In the 2015 offseason, Thomas was permanently switched to wide receiver. His amount of touches dropped off but he was still able to score 1 touchdown on 17 catches for 140 yards, and score 1 rushing touchdown in 9 attempts for 34 yards. On December 31, 2015, Thomas was placed on the non-football illness (NFI) list.

==== 2016 season ====
Thomas made his return to the field in the 2016 season. He saw much of his role decrease, especially as a return specialist, with the emergence of rookie speedster Tyreek Hill. Thomas still got to return 15 kicks for 338 yards, but didn't return a single punt. Yet, he was still able to obtain 35 yards off of 7 catches, and 29 yards in 4 rushing attempts. With his role decreased, he emerged in a different position as a gunner on punts and kicks. He compiled 3 tackles (2 solo) for the season.

==== 2017 season ====
At the beginning of the 2017 season, it looked as if Thomas' main role was kick returner. He was shortly removed from that job when he became more involved in the offense with the injury of their No. 1 receiver Chris Conley. In 16 games, Thomas had 143 yards on 14 receptions for 2 touchdowns. Those touchdowns came in back to back weeks, including a catch and run for 57 yards and a touchdown against the Pittsburgh Steelers on October 15. He also continued to be a gunner on special teams, racking up 2 combined tackles (1 solo). He was placed on injured reserve on January 2, 2018, with a leg injury.

==== 2018 season ====
On March 14, 2018, Thomas re-signed with the Chiefs. Thomas only played in 5 games during the 2018 season due to injury. On September 9, 2018, he caught a one-yard touchdown pass in a 38–28 win over the Los Angeles Chargers. The following week, against the Pittsburgh Steelers, Thomas returned a punt 48 yards in the 42–37 win. He continued as a gunner on special teams making 4 combined tackles (4 solo). He was placed on injured reserve on October 13, 2018, after suffering a fractured leg in practice.

==== 2019 season ====
On August 20, 2019, Thomas re-signed with the Chiefs. He was suspended for the first game of the season for violating the NFL's policy on substance abuse, and placed on reserve/suspended on August 31. He was reinstated from suspension and the Chiefs were given a roster exemption after the regular season opener on September 9. On September 10, he was activated. In only 6 games with the Chiefs, Thomas had a very slim role in the offense with 1 rushing attempt for 4 yards, and 1 reception for 6 yards. Despite the slim offensive role, Thomas continued as a return specialist with 7 kick returns for 155 yards, and 13 punt returns for 55 yards. On October 22, 2019, he was released by the Chiefs.

=== Baltimore Ravens ===
On November 5, 2019, Thomas was signed by the Baltimore Ravens. Thomas became the Ravens primary return man for the rest of the season. In 8 regular season games with the Ravens he returned 10 kickoffs for 166 yards, and 13 punts for 93 yards. For the offense, Thomas only received 1 rushing attempt for 1 yard. Thomas also played in the Ravens Divisional Round Playoff game against the Tennessee Titans where he added 3 kick returns for 71 yards in the loss.

On March 16, 2020, Thomas re-signed with the Ravens. He chose to opt-out of the 2020 NFL season due to the COVID-19 pandemic on July 27, 2020. He was waived after the season on January 18, 2021.

=== BC Lions ===
On February 1, 2022, Thomas signed with the BC Lions of the Canadian Football League for the 2022 season.

In May 2022, Thomas failed to show up to rookie training camp in Kamloops, BC.

He was officially released on February 13, 2024.

== After football ==
As of 2026, Thomas was working as a loan broker in Eugene, Oregon. He had developed a passion for disc golf.
