= 2011–12 NCAA football bowl games =

Series of college football bowl games played at the conclusion of the 2011 season

- Season: 2011
- Regular season: September 1, 2011 – December 10, 2011
- Number of bowls: 35
- All-star games: 5
- Bowl games: December 17, 2011 – January 9, 2012 (team-competitive)
- National Championship: 2012 BCS National Championship
- Location of Championship: Mercedes-Benz Superdome; New Orleans, Louisiana
- Champions: Alabama Crimson Tide
- Bowl Challenge Cup winner: (tie) C-USA and MAC
Bowl record by conference
| Conference | Bowls | Record | Number of teams in final AP poll |
| Big Ten | 10 | 4–6 (0.400) | 4 |
| SEC | 9 | 6–3 (0.667) | 5 |
| ACC | 8 | 2–6 (0.250) | 3 |
| Big 12 | 8 | 6–2 (0.750) | 4 |
| Pac-12 | 7 | 2–5 (0.286) | 3 |
| Big East | 5 | 3–2 (0.600) | 2 |
| Conference USA | 5 | 4–1 (0.800) | 2 |
| MAC | 5 | 4–1 (0.800) | 0 |
| Mountain West | 5 | 2–3 (0.400) | 2 |
| Sun Belt | 3 | 1–2 (0.333) | 0 |
| WAC | 3 | 0–3 (0.000) | 0 |
| Independents | 2 | 1–1 (0.500) | 0 |

The 2011–12 NCAA football bowl games were a series of college football bowl games. They concluded the 2011 NCAA Division I FBS football season, and included 35 team-competitive games and five all-star games. The games began on December 17, 2011, and, aside from the all-star games, concluded with the 2012 BCS National Championship Game in New Orleans, that was played on January 9, 2012.

The total of 35 team-competitive bowls was unchanged from the previous year. While bowl games had been the purview of only the very best teams for nearly a century, this was the sixth consecutive year that teams with non-winning seasons participated in bowl games. To fill the 70 available team-competitive bowl slots, a total of 14 teams (20% of all participants) with non-winning seasons participated in bowl games—13 had a .500 (6-6) season and, for the first time ever, a team with a sub-.500 (6-7) season was invited to a bowl game.

== Selection of the teams ==
In the previous year's bowl cycle, the NCAA scrapped a bylaw which mandated that a school with a non-losing record of 6–6 in regular season play were not eligible unless conferences could not fill out available bowl positions with teams with a winning record of seven (or more) wins. The new rule was stretched further in this 2011–12 bowl season when a team with a losing record, the 6–7 UCLA Bruins, were invited to a bowl game. The Bruins, the Pac-12 South Division winners, finished 6–6 but the USC Trojans (10–2), winners of the division, were barred from postseason play because of the University of Southern California athletics scandal of the mid-2000s, and the resulting two-year ban. The conference and the school applied for a waiver, which the NCAA accepted, based on their bowl eligibility after the sixth win, but having to play in an unmerited conference championship game.

This interpretation of policy ultimately led to Western Kentucky, with a 7–5 winning record, or Ball State, with a 6–6 non-losing record, going uninvited.

== Bowl eligibility ==
=== Eligible ===
- ACC (8): Clemson (ACC Champions), Georgia Tech, Virginia Tech (Coastal Division Champions), North Carolina, Florida State, Virginia, Wake Forest, NC State
- Big East (5): Cincinnati (Big East co-champions), West Virginia (Big East co-champions), Rutgers, Louisville (Big East co-champions), Pittsburgh
- Big Ten (10): Illinois, Michigan, Iowa, Penn State, Wisconsin (Big Ten Champions), Nebraska, Michigan State (Legends Division Champions), Ohio State, Northwestern, Purdue
- Big 12 (8): Oklahoma State (Big 12 Champions), Kansas State, Oklahoma, Texas, Baylor, Iowa State, Texas A&M, Missouri
- Conference USA (5): Houston (C-USA West Division Champions), Southern Miss (C-USA Champions), Tulsa, SMU, Marshall
- Independents (2): BYU, Notre Dame
- MAC (6): NIU (Mid-American Conference Champions), Ohio (MAC East Division Champions), Ball State, Toledo (MAC West Division Co-Champions), Temple, Western Michigan
- Mountain West (5): Air Force, Boise State, TCU (Mountain West Champions), San Diego State, Wyoming
- Pac-12 (7): Stanford (Pac-12 North Division Co-Champions), Oregon (Pac-12 Champions), Arizona State, Washington, California, Utah, UCLA (Pac-12 South Division Champions, 6–7, bowl-eligible per waiver)
- SEC (9): LSU (SEC Champions), Alabama, South Carolina, Arkansas, Georgia (SEC East Division Champions), Auburn, Florida, Vanderbilt, Mississippi State
- Sun Belt (4): Louisiana–Lafayette, Arkansas State (Sun Belt Champions), Florida International, Western Kentucky
- WAC (3): Louisiana Tech (WAC Champions), Nevada, Utah State

Number of bowl berths available: 70
Number of teams assured of bowl eligibility: 71 (72, with 6–7 UCLA becoming bowl-eligible per NCAA waiver)

Western Kentucky (7–5) and Ball State (6–6) were not extended invitations to bowl games.

=== Teams unable to become bowl-eligible ===
- ACC (4): Boston College, Maryland & Duke (by record), Miami (FL) (via self-imposed sanctions)
- Big East (3): South Florida, Syracuse, Connecticut
- Big Ten (2): Indiana, Minnesota
- Big 12 (2): Kansas, Texas Tech
- C-USA (7): UAB, Memphis, Tulane, Rice, UCF, UTEP, East Carolina
- Independents (2): Army & Navy
- MAC (7): Akron, Buffalo, Central Michigan, Bowling Green, Miami (OH) & Kent State. Eastern Michigan was 6–6 but had two FCS wins.
- Mountain West (3): New Mexico, UNLV & Colorado State
- Pac-12 (5): Colorado, Oregon State, Washington State & Arizona (by record), USC (via NCAA sanctions)
- SEC (3): Ole Miss, Kentucky & Tennessee
- Sun Belt (5): Florida Atlantic, Louisiana-Monroe, Middle Tennessee, Troy & North Texas
- WAC (5): Idaho, San Jose State, Fresno State, Hawaii & New Mexico State

== Fiesta Bowl controversy ==
In March 2011, because of illegal campaign contributions to politicians friendly to the Fiesta Bowl, the Fiesta Bowl Board of Directors fired bowl CEO John Junker. The scandal threatened the Fiesta Bowl's status as a BCS game for the 2011–12 season, as the BCS said it might replace the bowl in its lineup if officials could not convince them it should remain. In May 2011, the BCS fined the Fiesta Bowl organization US $1 million without removing their BCS spot.

== New bowl sponsors ==
Meineke has transferred their sponsorship from the game in Charlotte to the Houston-based game previously known as the Texas Bowl, and was renamed the Meineke Car Care Bowl of Texas. Belk Department Stores assumes the title sponsorship for the North Carolina contest, renaming that game the Belk Bowl. The Idaho Potato Commission takes over as the title sponsor for the Humanitarian Bowl in Boise, Idaho and has been renamed the Famous Idaho Potato Bowl, while Montreal-based Gildan, a maker of T-shirts, underwear and socks, will begin sponsorship of the previously unsponsored New Mexico Bowl this season. All of the bowl games will have a presenting or title sponsor.

== Moratorium on new bowl games ==
The NCAA has placed a three-year moratorium, starting with the 2011–12 bowl season, on any new bowl games. This follows the addition of two new games (Pinstripe Bowl, TicketCity Bowl) for the 2010–11 bowl season, bringing the total number of bowl games to 35. The expansion to 70 teams required to fill these 35 bowl games has challenged the ability to actually find enough teams with winning (7–5 or better) records to fill bowl slots. Teams with non-winning (6–6) and losing (6–7) records have participated in bowl games since the expansion to 35 games. By the 2012–13 bowl season, with multiple teams ineligible due to sanctions, the NCAA was forced to anticipate a need to allow teams with even worse (5–7) losing records to fill bowl selection slots in 2012–13.

== Schedule ==
The official schedule was released June 17, 2011. Though it is traditionally the date for many bowl games to be played, none were held on January 1, 2012, due to that date falling on a Sunday and conflicting with the National Football League's slate of Sunday games.

Subsequently, the Fiesta Bowl moved from January 5 to January 2, in its traditional spot following the Rose Bowl, after the 2011 NFL lockout was settled. The Monday evening spot was held open for a possible Monday Night Football game.

NOTE: All times are US EST (UTC −5).

=== Non-BCS games ===
| Date | Bowl | Location | Television | Teams | Affiliations | Results |
|---|---|---|---|---|---|---|
| Dec. 17 | New Mexico Bowl | University Stadium; University of New Mexico; Albuquerque, NM; 2:00 pm | ESPN | Wyoming Cowboys (8–4); Temple Owls (8–4) | MWC; MAC | Wyoming 15; Temple 37 |
| Dec. 17 | Famous Idaho Potato Bowl | Bronco Stadium; Boise State University; Boise, ID; 5:30 pm | ESPN | Ohio Bobcats (9–4); Utah State Aggies (7–5) | MAC; WAC | Ohio 24; Utah State 23 |
| Dec. 17 | New Orleans Bowl | Mercedes-Benz Superdome; New Orleans, LA; 9:00 pm | ESPN | San Diego State Aztecs (8–4); Louisiana–Lafayette Ragin' Cajuns (8–4) | MWC; Sun Belt | San Diego State 30; Louisiana–Lafayette 32 |
| Dec. 20 | Beef 'O' Brady's Bowl | Tropicana Field; St. Petersburg, FL; 8:00 pm | ESPN | FIU Golden Panthers (8–4); Marshall Thundering Herd (6–6) | Sun Belt; C-USA | FIU 10; Marshall 20 |
| Dec. 21 | Poinsettia Bowl | SDCCU Stadium; San Diego, CA; 8:00 pm | ESPN | #18 TCU Horned Frogs (10–2); Louisiana Tech Bulldogs (8–4) | MWC; WAC | TCU 31; Louisiana Tech 24 |
| Dec. 22 | Maaco Bowl Las Vegas | Sam Boyd Stadium; University of Nevada, Las Vegas; Whitney, NV; 8:00 pm | ESPN | #7 Boise State Broncos (11–1); Arizona State Sun Devils (6–6) | MWC; Pac-12 | Boise State 56; Arizona State 24 |
| Dec. 24 | Hawaii Bowl | Aloha Stadium; Honolulu, HI; 8:00 pm | ESPN | Nevada Wolf Pack (7–5) #21 Southern Miss Golden Eagles (11–2) | WAC; C-USA | Nevada 17; Southern Miss 24 |
| Dec. 26 | Independence Bowl | Independence Stadium; Shreveport, LA; 5:00 pm | ESPN2 | Missouri Tigers (7–5); North Carolina Tar Heels (7–5) | Big 12; ACC | Missouri 41; North Carolina 24 |
| Dec. 27 | Little Caesars Pizza Bowl | Ford Field; Detroit, MI; 4:30 pm | ESPN | Purdue Boilermakers (6–6); Western Michigan Broncos (7–5) | Big Ten; MAC | Purdue 37; Western Michigan 32 |
| Dec. 27 | Belk Bowl | Bank of America Stadium; Charlotte, NC; 8:00 pm | ESPN | North Carolina State Wolfpack (7–5); Louisville Cardinals (7–5) | ACC; Big East | North Carolina State 31; Louisville 24 |
| Dec. 28 | Military Bowl | RFK Stadium; Washington, DC; 4:30 pm | ESPN | Air Force Falcons (7–5); Toledo Rockets (8–4) (Note: Navy, which had the primary contract for this slot, was not bowl-eligible. For the 2011 season, the TicketCity Bowl and Military Bowl have contingency contracts with the Big 12 if those games' primary partners are not available. Since the TicketCity Bowl's primary partners (the Big Ten and C-USA) both filled their slots, Navy's Military Bowl slot was passed to the Big 12; however the Big 12 did not have enough teams to fulfill their contract, so Toledo from the MAC was invited.) | MWC; MAC | Air Force 41; Toledo 42 |
| Dec. 28 | Holiday Bowl | Snapdragon Stadium; San Diego, CA; 8:00 pm | ESPN | #24 Texas Longhorns (7–5); California Golden Bears (7–5) | Big 12; Pac-12 | Texas 21; California 10 |
| Dec. 29 | Champs Sports Bowl | Citrus Bowl; Orlando, FL; 5:30 pm | ESPN | Florida State Seminoles (8–4); Notre Dame Fighting Irish (8–4) | ACC; Independent | Florida State 18; Notre Dame 14 |
| Dec. 29 | Alamo Bowl | Alamodome; San Antonio, TX; 9:00 pm | ESPN | #12 Baylor Bears (9–3); Washington Huskies (7–5) | Big 12; Pac-12 | Baylor 67; Washington 56 |
| Dec. 30 | Armed Forces Bowl | Gerald J. Ford Stadium; University Park, TX; Noon | ESPN | BYU Cougars (9–3); Tulsa Golden Hurricane (8–4) | Independent; C-USA | BYU 24; Tulsa 21 |
| Dec. 30 | Pinstripe Bowl | Yankee Stadium; Bronx, NY; 3:20 pm | ESPN | Iowa State Cyclones (6–6); Rutgers Scarlet Knights (8–4) | Big 12; Big East | Iowa State 13; Rutgers 27 |
| Dec. 30 | Music City Bowl | LP Field; Nashville, TN; 6:40 pm | ESPN | Wake Forest Demon Deacons (6–6); Mississippi State Bulldogs (6–6) | ACC; SEC | Wake Forest 17; Mississippi State 23 |
| Dec. 30 | Insight Bowl | Sun Devil Stadium; Tempe, AZ; 10:00 pm | ESPN | Iowa Hawkeyes (7–5) #14 Oklahoma Sooners (9–3) | Big Ten; Big 12 | Iowa 14; Oklahoma 31 |
| Dec. 31 | Meineke Car Care Bowl of Texas | Reliant Stadium; Houston, TX; Noon | ESPN | Texas A&M Aggies (6–6); Northwestern Wildcats (6–6) | Big 12; Big Ten | Texas A&M 33; Northwestern 22 |
| Dec. 31 | Sun Bowl | Sun Bowl Stadium; University of Texas El Paso; El Paso, TX; 2:00 pm | CBS | Georgia Tech Yellow Jackets (8–4); Utah Utes (7–5) | ACC; Pac-12 | Georgia Tech 27; Utah 30 (OT) |
| Dec. 31 | AutoZone Liberty Bowl | Liberty Bowl Memorial Stadium; Memphis, TN; 3:30 pm | ABC | Cincinnati Bearcats (9–3); Vanderbilt Commodores (6–6) | Big East; SEC | Cincinnati 31; Vanderbilt 24 |
| Dec. 31 | Kraft Fight Hunger Bowl | AT&T Park; San Francisco, CA; 3:30 pm | ESPN | Illinois Fighting Illini (6–6) (Note: Army, which had the primary contract for this slot, was not bowl-eligible. The ACC had a contingency contract for the slot, but could only fill it if it produced nine bowl-eligible teams. Miami's self-imposed bowl ban made it impossible for the conference to fill that slot.); UCLA Bruins (6–7) | Big Ten; Pac-12 | Illinois 20; UCLA 14 |
| Dec. 31 | Chick-fil-A Bowl | Georgia Dome; Atlanta, GA; 7:30 pm | ESPN | #25 Auburn Tigers (7–5); Virginia Cavaliers (8–4) | SEC; ACC | Auburn 43; Virginia 24 |
| Jan. 2 | TicketCity Bowl | Cotton Bowl; Dallas, TX; Noon | ESPNU | #22 Penn State Nittany Lions (9–3) #19 Houston Cougars (12–1) | Big Ten; C-USA | Penn State 14; Houston 30 |
| Jan. 2 | Outback Bowl | Raymond James Stadium; Tampa, FL; 1:00 pm | ABC | #17 Michigan State Spartans (10–3) #16 Georgia Bulldogs (10–3) | Big Ten; SEC | Michigan State 33; Georgia 30 (3OT) |
| Jan. 2 | Capital One Bowl | Citrus Bowl; Orlando, FL; 1:00 pm | ESPN | #20 Nebraska Cornhuskers (9–3) #9 South Carolina Gamecocks (10–2) | Big Ten; SEC | Nebraska 13; South Carolina 30 |
| Jan. 2 | Gator Bowl | EverBank Field; Jacksonville, FL; 1:00 pm | ESPN2 | Ohio State Buckeyes (6–6); Florida Gators (6–6) | Big Ten; SEC | Ohio State 17; Florida 24 |
| Jan. 6 | Cotton Bowl Classic | Cowboys Stadium; Arlington, TX; 8:00 pm | FOX | #8 Kansas State Wildcats (10–2) #6 Arkansas Razorbacks (10–2) | Big 12; SEC | Kansas State 16; Arkansas 29 |
| Jan. 7 | BBVA Compass Bowl | Legion Field; Birmingham, AL; 1:00 pm | ESPN | SMU Mustangs (7–5); Pittsburgh Panthers (6–6) | C-USA; Big East | SMU 28; Pittsburgh 6 |
| Jan. 8 | GoDaddy.com Bowl | Ladd–Peebles Stadium; Mobile, AL; 9:00 pm | ESPN | NIU Huskies (10–3); Arkansas State Red Wolves (10–2) | MAC; Sun Belt | NIU 38; Arkansas State 20 |

=== 2012 Bowl Championship Series schedule ===
| Date | Game | Site | Television | Teams | Affiliations | Results |
|---|---|---|---|---|---|---|
| Jan. 2 | Rose Bowl | Rose Bowl; Pasadena, CA; 5:00 pm | ESPN | #10 Wisconsin Badgers (11–2) #5 Oregon Ducks (11–2) | Big Ten; Pac-12 | Wisconsin 38; Oregon 45 |
| Jan. 2 | Fiesta Bowl | University of Phoenix Stadium; Glendale, AZ; 8:30 pm | ESPN | #3 Oklahoma State Cowboys (11–1) #4 Stanford Cardinal (11–1) | Big 12; Pac-12 | Oklahoma State 41; Stanford 38 (OT) |
| Jan. 3 | Sugar Bowl | Mercedes-Benz Superdome; New Orleans, LA; 8:30 pm | ESPN | #13 Michigan Wolverines (10–2) #11 Virginia Tech Hokies (11–2) | Big Ten; ACC | Michigan 23; Virginia Tech 20 (OT) |
| Jan. 4 | Orange Bowl | Sun Life Stadium; Miami Gardens, FL; 8:30 pm | ESPN | #15 Clemson Tigers (10–3) #23 West Virginia Mountaineers (9–3) | ACC; Big East | Clemson 33; West Virginia 70 |
| Jan. 9 | BCS National Championship Game | Mercedes-Benz Superdome; New Orleans, LA; 8:30 pm | ESPN | #1 LSU Tigers (13–0) #2 Alabama Crimson Tide (11–1) | SEC; SEC | LSU 0 Alabama 21 |

=== Post-BCS all-star games ===
| Date | Game | Site | Television | Participants | Results |
|---|---|---|---|---|---|
| Jan. 16 | Casino del Sol College All-Star Game | Kino Veterans Memorial Stadium; Tucson, AZ; 6:00 pm | Fox Sports Arizona and Fox College Sports | Stars vs. Stripes | Stripes 24; Stars 21 |
| Jan. 21 | 2012 East–West Shrine Game | Tropicana Field; St. Petersburg, FL; 4:00 pm | NFL Network | East Team vs. West Team | West 20; East 17 |
| Jan. 21 | NFLPA Collegiate Bowl | The Home Depot Center; Carson, CA; 6:00 pm | NBC Sports Network | American vs. National | National 20; American 14 |
| Jan. 21 | The Battle of Florida | FAU Stadium; Florida Atlantic University; Boca Raton, FL; 8:00 pm | Fox College Sports | North Florida vs. South Florida | North Florida 51; South Florida 3 |
| Jan. 28 | 2012 Senior Bowl | Ladd–Peebles Stadium; Mobile, AL; 4:00 pm | NFL Network | North Team vs. South Team | North 23; South 13 |

Note: The NFLPA Texas vs The Nation game was not played in 2012, and the NFLPA instead sponsored the NFLPA Collegiate Bowl.
