= 2011 UCLA Bruins football team =

American college football season

2011 UCLA Bruins football

Pac-12 South Division champion

Pac-12 Championship Game, L 31–49 vs. Oregon

Kraft Fight Hunger Bowl, L 14–20 vs. Illinois
- Conference: Pac-12 Conference
- South Division
- Record: 6–8 (5–4 Pac-12)
- Head coach: Rick Neuheisel (4th season; first 13 games); Mike Johnson (interim; bowl game)
- Offensive coordinator: Mike Johnson (1st season)
- Offensive scheme: Pistol
- Defensive coordinator: Joe Tresey (1st season)
- Base defense: 4–3
- Home stadium: Rose Bowl

2011 Pac-12 Conference football standings
	Conf.			Overall
Team	W		L	W		L
North Division
No. 4 Oregon xy$	8	–	1	12	–	2
No. 7 Stanford x%	8	–	1	11	–	2
Washington	5	–	4	7	–	6
California	4	–	5	7	–	6
Oregon State	3	–	6	3	–	9
Washington State	2	–	7	4	–	8
South Division
No. 6 USC †	7	–	2	10	–	2
UCLA xy	5	–	4	6	–	8
Utah	4	–	5	8	–	5
Arizona State	4	–	5	6	–	7
Arizona	2	–	7	4	–	8
Colorado	2	–	7	3	–	10
Championship: Oregon 49, UCLA 31
$ – BCS representative as conference champion; % – BCS at-large representative; x – Division champion/co-champions; y – Championship game participant; † – USC ineligible for championship and postseason due to NCAA sanctions; Rankings from AP Poll

The 2011 UCLA Bruins football team represented the University of California, Los Angeles in the 2011 NCAA Division I FBS football season. The team was coached during the regular season by fourth year head coach Rick Neuheisel and played their home games at the Rose Bowl in Pasadena, California. Mike Johnson was named the interim head coach for the Kraft Fight Hunger Bowl after Neuheisel was fired.

On November 25, 2011, with Colorado's defeat of Utah, the Bruins were declared the South Division champions. On November 28, 2011, UCLA announced that it had fired Neuheisel but would allow him to coach his final game in the first Pac-12 Football Championship Game on December 2, 2011. The Bruins were then defeated 49–31 in that game by Oregon at Autzen Stadium. The season concluded with a loss to Illinois, 20–14, in the Kraft Fight Hunger Bowl and completed a 6–8 overall record (5–4 in the Pac-12). With the loss to Illinois, UCLA became the first bowl-eligible team to ever lose eight games.

The radio broadcast team members on flagship station KLAC-AM 570 were Chris Roberts, play-by-play; Matt Stevens, analyst; and Wayne Cook, sidelines.

== Schedule ==
Date	Time	Opponent	Site	TV	Result	Attendance
September 3	12:30 pm	at Houston*	Robertson Stadium; Houston, TX	FSN	L 34–38	31,144
September 10	7:00 pm	San Jose State*	Rose Bowl; Pasadena, CA	FSW	W 27–17	42,685
September 17	12:30 pm	No. 23 Texas*	Rose Bowl; Pasadena, CA	ABC/ESPN	L 20–49	54,583
September 24	12:30 pm	at Oregon State	Reser Stadium; Corvallis, OR	FSPT	W 27–19	44,352
October 1	7:30 pm	at No. 6 Stanford	Stanford Stadium; Stanford, CA (rivalry)	FSN	L 19–45	50,360
October 8	7:30 pm	Washington State	Rose Bowl; Pasadena, CA	FSN	W 28–25	64,217
October 20	6:00 pm	at Arizona	Arizona Stadium; Tucson, AZ	ESPN	L 12–48	46,565
October 29	4:00 pm	California^{†}	Rose Bowl; Pasadena, CA (rivalry)	FSPT	W 31–14	55,604
November 5	4:30 pm	No. 20 Arizona State	Rose Bowl; Pasadena, CA	Versus	W 29–28	65,438
November 12	3:30 pm	at Utah	Rice-Eccles Stadium; Salt Lake City, UT	FSPT	L 6–31	45,039
November 19	4:30 pm	Colorado	Rose Bowl; Pasadena, CA	Versus	W 45–6	57,344
November 26	7:00 pm	at No. 10 USC	Los Angeles Memorial Coliseum; Los Angeles, CA (Victory Bell)	FSN	L 0–50	93,607
December 2	5:00 pm	at No. 8 Oregon	Autzen Stadium; Eugene, OR (Pac-12 Championship Game)	FOX	L 31–49	59,376
December 31	12:30 pm	vs. Illinois*	AT&T Park; San Francisco, CA (Kraft Fight Hunger Bowl)	ESPN	L 14–20	29,878
*Non-conference game; ^{†}Homecoming; Rankings from AP Poll released prior to the game; All times are in Pacific time

== Key players ==
- Anthony Barr (No. 2), So., FB
- Richard Brehaut (No. 12), Jr., QB
- Derrick Coleman (No. 33) Sr., TB
- Tony Dye (No. 6), Sr., FS (Co-Captain)
- Taylor Embree (No. 82), Sr., WR
- Johnathan Franklin (No. 23), Jr., RB (Co-Captain)
- Dalton Hillard (No. 19), Jr., SS
- Datone Jones (No. 56), Jr. (R), DE
- Patrick Larimore (No. 42), Jr., LB (Co-Captain)
- Jeff Locke (No. 18), Jr., P
- Kevin Prince (No. 4), Jr., QB
- Dietrich Riley (No. 1), So., SS
- Kip Smith (No. 17) Fr. (R), PK
- Sean Westgate (No. 11), Jr. (R), LB
- Jordan James (No. 6), Fr. RB
- Nelson Rosario (No. 83) Sr. WR
- Jerry Rice Jr. (No. 88) Fr. WR

== Recruitment ==
UCLA's recruits:

College recruiting
Name	Hometown	School	Height	Weight	40^{‡}	Commit date
Albert Cid; OG	Glendora, CA	Citrus College	6 ft 4 in (1.93 m)	320 lb (150 kg)	N/A	May 11, 2011
Albert Cid; OG	Recruit ratings: Scout: (NR)					
Anthony Thompson; CB	Montreal, CAN	Vanier College	6 ft 1 in (1.85 m)	208 lb (94 kg)	N/A	Feb 16, 2011
Anthony Thompson; CB	Recruit ratings: Scout: (NR)					
Devin Lucien; WR	Encino, CA	Crespi Carmelite High School	6 ft 0 in (1.83 m)	190 lb (86 kg)	4.5	Feb 2, 2011
Devin Lucien; WR	Recruit ratings: Scout: Rivals: 247Sports: ESPN: (78)					
Kevin McReynolds; DT	Washington, DC	St. John College High School	6 ft 2 in (1.88 m)	280 lb (130 kg)	4.77	Feb 2, 2011
Kevin McReynolds; DT	Recruit ratings: Scout: Rivals: 247Sports: ESPN: (79)					
Torian White; OT	Lakewood, CA	Lakewood High School	6 ft 6 in (1.98 m)	275 lb (125 kg)	4.95	Feb 2, 2011
Torian White; OT	Recruit ratings: Scout: Rivals: 247Sports: ESPN: (75)					
Jerry Neuheisel; QB	Los Angeles, CA	Loyola High School	6 ft 1 in (1.85 m)	185 lb (84 kg)	N/A	Feb 2, 2011
Jerry Neuheisel; QB	Recruit ratings: Scout: Rivals: 247Sports: (NR)					
Conor McDermott; TE	Nashville, TN	Ensworth High School	6 ft 8 in (2.03 m)	250 lb (110 kg)	N/A	Feb 2, 2011
Conor McDermott; TE	Recruit ratings: Scout: Rivals: 247Sports: (NR)					
Brandon Tuliaupupu; DT	Claremont, CA	Claremont High School	6 ft 2 in (1.88 m)	280 lb (130 kg)	N/A	Feb 2, 2011
Brandon Tuliaupupu; DT	Recruit ratings: Scout: Rivals: 247Sports: ESPN: (77)					
Mike Orloff; OLB	Danvers, MA	Lawrence Academy	6 ft 1 in (1.85 m)	210 lb (95 kg)	4.60	Jan 31, 2011
Mike Orloff; OLB	Recruit ratings: Scout: Rivals: 247Sports: ESPN: (70)					
Will Oliver; OT	Brentwood, CA	Heritage High School	6 ft 6 in (1.98 m)	280 lb (130 kg)	N/A	Jan 30, 2011
Will Oliver; OT	Recruit ratings: Scout: Rivals: 247Sports: (NR)					
Steven Manfro; RB	Castaic, CA	Valencia High School	5 ft 10 in (1.78 m)	176 lb (80 kg)	4.42	Jan 23, 2011
Steven Manfro; RB	Recruit ratings: Scout: Rivals: 247Sports: ESPN: (74)					
Ryan Hofmeister; OLB	Monrovia, CA	Riverside Community College	6 ft 1 in (1.85 m)	210 lb (95 kg)	4.7	Nov 14, 2010
Ryan Hofmeister; OLB	Recruit ratings: Scout: Rivals: 247Sports: (NR)					
Sammel woods DE	Las Vegas, NV	Las Vegas High School	6 ft 1 in (1.85 m)	240 lb (110 kg)	4.7	Nov 10, 2010
Sammel woods DE	Recruit ratings: Scout: Rivals: 247Sports: (NR)					
Brett Hundley; QB	Chandler, AZ	Chandler High School	6 ft 4 in (1.93 m)	217 lb (98 kg)	4.65	Sep 6, 2010
Brett Hundley; QB	Recruit ratings: Scout: Rivals: 247Sports: ESPN: (81)					
Raymond Nelson; TE	Modesto, CA	Modesto Christian High School	6 ft 5 in (1.96 m)	238 lb (108 kg)	4.7	Aug 5, 2010
Raymond Nelson; TE	Recruit ratings: Scout: Rivals: 247Sports: (NR)					
Aaron Wallace, Jr. OLB	San Diego, CA	Rancho Bernardo High School	6 ft 3 in (1.91 m)	215 lb (98 kg)	4.55	Jul 28, 2010
Aaron Wallace, Jr. OLB	Recruit ratings: Scout: Rivals: 247Sports: ESPN: (75)					
Jake Brendel; C	Plano, TX	Plano East Senior High School	6 ft 4 in (1.93 m)	268 lb (122 kg)	4.95	Jul 12, 2010
Jake Brendel; C	Recruit ratings: Scout: Rivals: 247Sports: ESPN: (77)					
Ben Wysocki; OG	Los Alamitos, CA	Los Alamitos High School	6 ft 4 in (1.93 m)	270 lb (120 kg)	N/A	Jul 5, 2010
Ben Wysocki; OG	Recruit ratings: Scout: Rivals: 247Sports: ESPN: (77)					
Overall recruit ranking: Scout: 56 Rivals: 45 247Sports: 45
Note: In many cases, Scout, Rivals, 247Sports, On3, and ESPN may conflict in their listings of height and weight.; In these cases, the average was taken. ESPN grades are on a 100-point scale.; Sources: "2011 Team Ranking". Rivals.com.

== Game summaries ==
=== Houston ===
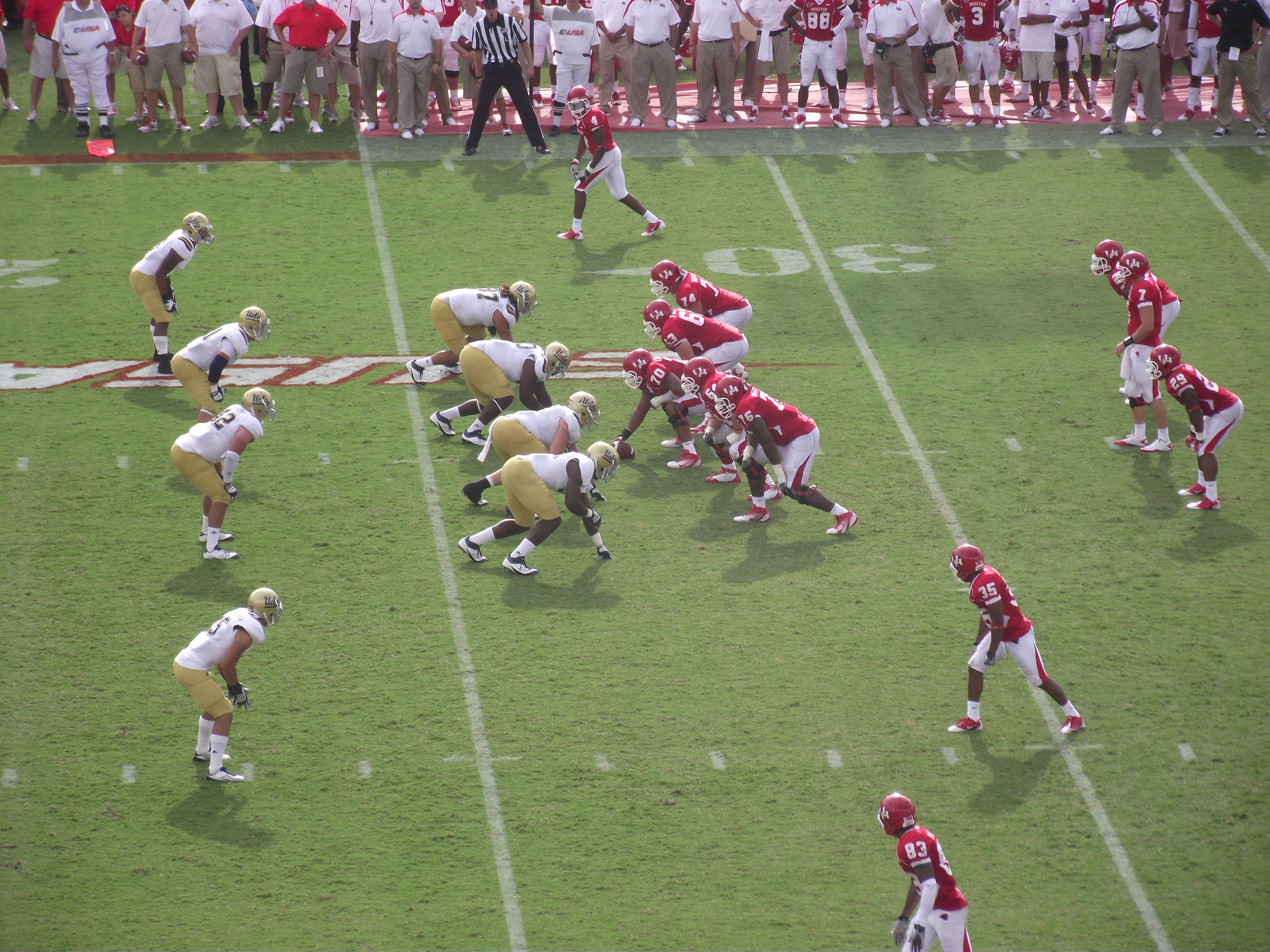
UCLA at Houston

	1	2	3	4	Total
Bruins	0	14	14	6	34
Cougars	10	21	0	7	38

At game time, UCLA led the series with Houston 3–2, which started on September 17, 1977, in the Astrodome. Last year, the Bruins defeated the Cougars 31–13 in the Rose Bowl.

1st Quarter scoring: HOU – Michael Hayes 1-yard run (Matt Hogan kick); HOU – Hogan 35-yard field goal

2nd Quarter scoring: UCLA – Johnathan Franklin 18-yard run (Kip Smith kick); HOU – Bryce Beall, 12-yard run (Hogan kick); UCLA – Joseph Fauria 5-yard pass from Richard Brehaut (Smith kick); HOU – Hayes 34-yard run (Hogan kick); HOU – Tyron Carrier 23-yard pass from Case Keenum (Hogan kick)

3rd Quarter scoring: UCLA – Derrick Coleman 1-yard run (Smith kick); UCLA – Brehaut 1-yard run (Smith kick)

4th Quarter scoring: HOU – Chris Thompson 0-yard fumble recovery (Hogan kick); UCLA – Anthony Barr 11-yard pass from Brehaut (Smith kick blocked)

=== San Jose State ===
	1	2	3	4	Total
Spartans	0	7	10	0	17
Bruins	7	7	3	10	27

The two teams met for the first time in football.

The Spartans' Brandon Rutley provided the highlight of the game with a 65-yard run in the third quarter to tie the score, 17–17. But the Bruins scored a field goal and a Derrick Coleman touchdown in the fourth quarter to come out with their first victory for the 2011 season, their sixth of the last seven home opener victories.

1st Quarter scoring: UCLA – Johnathan Franklin 1-yard run (Kip Smith kick).

2nd Quarter scoring: SJSU – David Freeman 1-yard run (Harrison Waid kick); UCLA – Johseph Fauria 14-yard pass from Richard Brehaut (Smith kick).

3rd Quarter scoring: SJSU – Waid 25-yard field goal; UCLA – Smith 38-yard field goal; SJSU – Brandon Rutley 65-yard run (Waid kick).

4th Quarter scoring: UCLA – Smith 20-yard field goal; UCLA – Derrick Coleman 24-yard run (Smith kick).

=== Texas ===
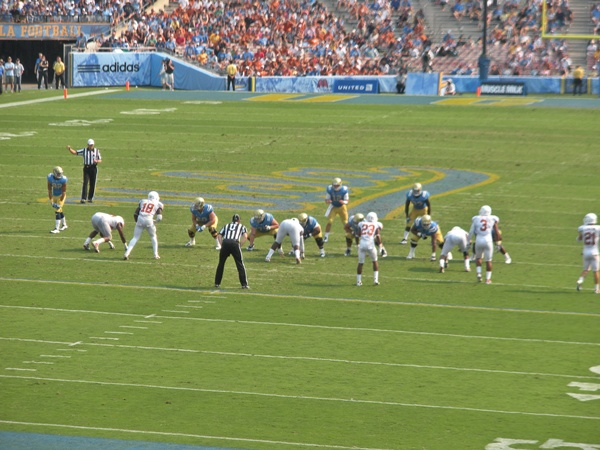
The Longhorns visit the Bruins in the Rose Bowl

	1	2	3	4	Total
#23 Longhorns	14	14	14	7	49
Bruins	0	10	10	0	20

The two teams are meeting for the sixth time, with the Bruins holding a 3–2 edge. The Longhorns are going back to the Rose Bowl for the fourth time in eight years, including a win in the 2005 Rose Bowl against Michigan, a win in the 2006 Rose Bowl against USC for the 2005 National Championship and a loss in the 2009 BCS National Championship Game against Alabama.

1st Quarter scoring: UT – D. J. Grant 45-yard pass from Case McCoy (Justin Tucker kick); UT – Fozz Whittaker 8-yard run (Tucker kick).

2nd Quarter scoring: UT – Malcolm Brown 16-yard run (Tucker kick); UCLA – Derrick Coleman 1-yard run (Jeff Locke kick); UT – Grant 2-yard pass from McCoy (Tucker kick); UCLA – Locke 51-yard field goal.

3rd Quarter scoring: UCLA – Locke 49-yard field goal; UT – Grant 5-yard pass from Jaxon Shipley (Tucker kick); UCLA – Coleman 1-yard run (Locke kick); UT – Whittaker 36-yard run (Tucker kick)

4th Quarter scoring: UT – Cody Johnson 7-yard run (Tucker kick)

=== Oregon State ===
	1	2	3	4	Total
Bruins	7	14	0	6	27
Beavers	3	7	9	0	19

UCLA leads the series 40–15–4 that began in 1930 and played in Los Angeles, Corvallis, Portland and Tokyo (1980 Mirage Bowl). The Bruins won last year 17–14 on Kai Forbath's 51-yard field goal on the last play of the game.

First Quarter scoring: OSU – Trevor Romaine 25-yard field goal; UCLA – Taylor Embree 22-yard pass from Richard Brehaut (Jeff Locke kick)

Second Quarter scoring: UCLA – Brehaut 5-yard run (Locke kick); UCLA – Jordon James 4-yard run (Locke kick); OSU – Jordan Poyer 85-yard punt return (Romaine kick)

Third Quarter scoring: OSU – Romaine 30-yard field goal; OSU – Jordan Bishop 45-yard pass from Sean Mannion (Two-point pass conversion failed)

Fourth Quarter scoring: UCLA – Anthony Barr 1-yard run (PAT blocked)

=== Stanford ===
	1	2	3	4	Total
Bruins	0	7	6	6	19
#6 Cardinal	7	10	14	14	45

UCLA leads Stanford 45–33–3 in a series that dates back to 1925. For games played at Stanford, both teams have the same 19–19–2 record.

First Quarter scoring: STAN – Coby Fleener 18-yard pass from Andrew Luck (Jordan Williamson kick)

Second Quarter scoring: STAN – Stepfan Taylor 2-yard run (Williamson kick); STAN – Williamson 23-yard field goal; UCLA – Joseph Fauria 12-yard pass from Richard Brehaut (Jeff Locke kick)

Third Quarter scoring: STAN – Fleener 51-yard pass from Luck (Williamson kick); UCLA – Fauria 13-yard pass from Brehaut (Locke kick failed); STAN – Tyler Gaffney 16-yard run (Williamson kick)

Fourth Quarter scoring: UCLA – Josh Smith 7-yard run (Locke kick failed); STAN – Taylor 1-yard run (Williamson kick); STAN – Chris Owusu 5-yard pass from Luck (Williamson kick)

=== Washington State ===
	1	2	3	4	Total
Cougars	3	6	7	9	25
Bruins	0	7	7	14	28

UCLA leads Washington State 38–18–1 in this series started in 1928. At the Rose Bowl, the Bruins are 8–5 on the Cougars.

First Quarter scoring: WSU – Andrew Furney 21-yard field goal

Second Quarter scoring: WSU – Furney 26-yard field goal; UCLA – Derrick Coleman 1-yard run (Tyler Gonzalez Kick); WSU – Furney 21-yard field goal

Third Quarter scoring: UCLA – Coleman 1-yard run (Gonzalez Kick); WSU – Jared Karstetter 8-yard pass from Marshall Lobbestael (Furney kick)

Fourth Quarter scoring: WSU – Rickey Galvin 21-yard pass from Lobbestael (PAT blocked); UCLA – Josh Smith 9-yard pass from Kevin Prince (Two-point conversion failed); WSU – Furney 47-yard field goal; UCLA – Shaquelle Evans 7-yard pass from Prince (Prince pass to Nelson Rosario two-point conversion)

=== Arizona ===
UCLA Bruins (3–3) at Arizona Wildcats (1–5)

Quarter	1	2	3	4	Total
UCLA	7	0	0	5	12
Arizona	14	28	3	3	48

at Arizona Stadium • Tucson, Arizona

- Date: October 20
- Game time: 6:00 p.m. MST
- Game weather: Clear • 88 °F (31 °C) • Wind 8 mph (13 km/h) W
- Game attendance: 46,565
- Referee: Jack Folliard
- TV: ESPN
- Automated ScoreBook

Game information

UCLA

- Kevin Prince
  17/35, 286 Yds, TD
  13 Rush, 13 Yds
- Nelson Rosario
  4 Rec, 78 Yds

Arizona

- Nick Foles
  26/39, 291 Yds, 3 TD, INT
- Keola Antolin
  8 Rush, 77 Yds
- Juron Criner
  10 Rec, 101 Yds, 3 TD

Since 1927, UCLA is ahead of Arizona 19–14–2 in this series. The Wildcats have a 10–8 advantage in games played in Tucson, including the last three wins in the Desert. Before halftime, a streaker dressed as a referee and ran off the field, and a fight ensued, leading to two players being ejected, and six Bruins players being suspended.

Scoring summary

Quarter	Time	Drive			Team	Scoring information	Score	
Quarter	Time	Plays	Yards	TOP	Team	Scoring information	UCLA	ARIZ
1	12:43	8	80	2:17	Arizona	Criner 4-yard touchdown reception from Foles, Bonano kick good	0	7
1	7:38	10	76	3:32	Arizona	Carey 18-yard touchdown run, Bonano kick good	0	14
1	2:53	10	73	4:40	UCLA	Franklin 16-yard touchdown reception from Prince, Gonzalez kick good	7	14
2	14:31	10	80	3:22	Arizona	Criner 7-yard touchdown reception from Foles, Bonano kick good	7	21
2	9:24	8	63	3:33	Arizona	Tutogi 1-yard touchdown run, Bonano kick good	7	28
2	3:29	10	79	3:14	Arizona	Criner 25-yard touchdown reception from Foles, Bonano kick good	7	35
2	1:09	5	59	2:03	Arizona	Tutogi 8-yard touchdown run, Bonano kick good	7	42
3	3:15	10	48	3:22	Arizona	41-yard field goal by Bonano	7	45
4	10:28	11	51	4:15	Arizona	22-yard field goal by Bonano	7	48
4	6:34				UCLA	Jenkins tackled in end zone for a safety by Love	9	48
4	4:17	8	32	2:15	UCLA	42-yard field goal by Gonzalez	12	48
"TOP" = time of possession. For other American football terms, see Glossary of American football.							12	48

=== California ===
	1	2	3	4	Total
Golden Bears	7	0	7	0	14
Bruins	0	17	0	14	31

Homecoming.

First Quarter scoring: CAL – Isi Sofele 1-yard run (Giorgio Tavecchio kick)

Second Quarter scoring: UCLA – Johnathan Franklin 11-yard run (Tyler Gonzalez kick); UCLA – Gonzalez 32-yard; UCLA – Derrick Coleman 2-yard run (Gonzalez kick)

Third Quarter scoring: CAL – C.J. Anderson 1-yard run (Tavecchio kick)

Fourth Quarter scoring: UCLA – Coleman 20-yard run (Gonzalez kick); UCLA – Coleman 24-yard run (Gonzalez kick)

=== Arizona State ===
	1	2	3	4	Total
#20 Sun Devils	7	7	7	7	28
Bruins	6	10	7	6	29

First quarter scoring: UCLA – Johnathan Franklin 11-yard run (Tyler Gonzalez kick failed); ASU – A.J. Pickens 35-yard pass from Brock Osweiler (Alex Garoutte kick)

Second quarter scoring: ASU – C. Marshall 14-yard run (Garoutte kick); UCLA – Gonzalez 43-yard field goal; UCLA – Derrick Coleman 1-yard run (Gonzalez kick)

Third quarter scoring: UCLA – Nelson Rosario 76-yard pass from Kevin Prince (Gonzalez kick); ASU – Jamal Miles, 9-yard pass from Brock Osweiler (Garoutte kick)

Fourth quarter scoring: ASU – Osweiler 1-yard run (Garoutte kick); UCLA – Coleman 1-yard run (Prince pass failed)

=== Utah ===
	1	2	3	4	Total
Bruins	3	0	0	3	6
Utes	0	7	14	10	31

First Quarter scoring: UCLA – Tyler Gonzalez 30-yard field goal

Second Quarter scoring: UTAH – John White 1-yard run (Colem Petersen kick)

Third Quarter scoring: UTAH – White 13-yard pass from Jon Hays (Petersen kick); UTAH – White 22-yard run (Petersen kick)

Fourth Quarter scoring: UCLA – Gonzalez 35-yard field goal; UTAH – Conroy Black 67-yard interception return (Petersen kick); UTAH – Petersen 38-yard field goal

=== Colorado ===
	1	2	3	4	Total
Buffaloes	0	6	0	0	6
Bruins	21	0	3	21	45

First Quarter scoring: UCLA – Shaqell Evans 54-yard pass from Kevin Prince (Tyler Gonzalez kick); UCLA – Johnathan Franklin 14-yard run (Gonzalez kick); UCLA – Joseph Fauria 5-yard pass from Prince (Gonzalez kick)

Second Quarter scoring: CU – Toney Clemons 20-yard pass from Tyler Hansen ( Will Oliver kick failed)

Third Quarter scoring: UCLA – Gonzalez 22-yard field goal

Fourth Quarter scoring: UCLA – Fauria 15-yard pass from Prince (Gonzalez kick); UCLA – Nelson Rosario 11-yard pass from Prince (Gonzalez kick); UCLA – Malcolm Jones 1-yard run (Gonzalez kick)

=== USC ===
Although UCLA and USC had worked out an arrangement to allow each team to wear home uniforms for the rivalry game, in 2011 UCLA debuted an all-white uniform for this game.

	1	2	3	4	Total
Bruins	0	0	0	0	0
#10 Trojans	14	15	14	7	50

First Quarter scoring: USC – Marqise Lee 42-yard pass from Matt Barkley (Andre Heidari kick); USC – Curtis McNeal 73-yard run (Heidari kick)

Second Quarter scoring: USC – Randall Telfer 1-yard pass from Barkley (Xavier Grimble pass from Barkley); USC – Rhett Ellison 3-yard pass from Barkley (Heidari kick)

Third Quarter scoring: USC – Marqise Lee 52-yard pass from Barkley (Heidari kick); USC – Robert Woods 4-yard pass from Barkley (Heidar kick)

Fourth Quarter scoring: USC – Woods 41-yard pass from Barkley (Heidari kick)

=== Oregon (Pac-12 Conference Championship) ===
	1	2	3	4	Total
Bruins	7	10	7	7	31
#8 Ducks	21	14	14	0	49

Head coach Rick Neuheisel coached his final game for the Bruins.

First Quarter scoring: ORE – LaMichael James 30-yard run (Alejandro Maldonado kick); UCLA – Patrick Larimore 35-yard interception return (Tyler Gonzalez kick); ORE – Darron Thomas 10-yard run (Maldonado kick); ORE – Colt Lyerla 7-yard pass from Thomas, Darron (Maldonado kick)

Second Quarter scoring: UCLA – Nelson Rosario 37-yard pass from Kevin Prince (Gonzalez kick); ORE – James 3-yard run (Maldonado kick); ORE – Daryle Hawkins 25-yard pass from Thomas (Maldonado kick); UCLA – Gonzalez 44-yard field goal

Third Quarter scoring: UCLA – Prince 1-yard run (Gonzalez kick); ORE – James 5-yard run (Maldonado kick); ORE – David Paulson 22-yard pass from Thomas (Maldonado kick)

Fourth Quarter scoring: UCLA – Nelson Rosario 19-yard pass from Prince (Gonzalez kick)

=== Illinois (Kraft Fight Hunger Bowl) ===
	1	2	3	4	Total
Fighting Illini	0	3	7	10	20
Bruins	0	7	0	7	14

Despite a losing record, the Bruins (6–7) were granted a waiver to play in a bowl game by the NCAA on November 30, 2011, after the Pac-12 conference did not have enough eligible teams to fill its bowl commitments. The Bruins were coached by interim head coach Mike Johnson, who replaced Rick Neuheisel, while the Fighting Illini were coached by interim head coach Vic Koenning, replacing Ron Zook.

First Quarter scoring: No score

Second Quarter scoring: UCLA – Taylor Embree 16-yard pass from Kevin Prince (Tyler Gonzalez kick); ILL – Derek Dimke 36-yard field goal

Third Quarter scoring: ILL – T. Hawthorne 39-yard interception return (Dimke kick)

Fourth Quarter scoring: ILL – Dimke 37-yard field goal; ILL – A. J. Jenkins 60-yard pass from N. Scheelhaase (Dimke kick); UCLA – Nelson Rosario 38-yard pass from Prince (Gonzalez kick),

== Coaches ==
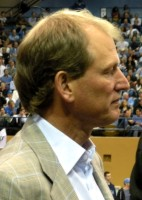
Head coach Rick Neuheisel

- Rick Neuheisel – Head coach
- Joe Tresey – Defensive coordinator
- Mike Johnson – Offensive coordinator
- Inoke Breckterfield – Defensive line
- Tim Hundley – Secondary
- Jim Mastro – Tight ends/fullbacks
- Clark Lea – Linebackers
- Angus McClure, special teams
- Wayne Moses – Running backs
- Bob Palcic – Offensive line
- Marcus Patton – Graduate assistant/defense

== Notes ==
- August 8–20, 2011 – Public pre-season football practices begin on August 8, 2011, and end with a scrimmage at Drake Stadium on August 20, 2011.
- October 31, 2011 – Safety Tevin McDonald was named Bank of the West Pac-12 Defensive Player-of-the-Week.
- November 17, 2011 – Running back Malcolm Jones was selected to the 2011 Pac-12 Conference All-Academic first team, and sophomore F-back Anthony Barr and junior punter Jeff Locke to the second team.
- November 28, 2011 – Coach Rick Neuheisel was relieved of his duties three days after the 50–0 loss to rival USC. He was allowed to coach his final game at the December 2 Pac-12 Conference football Championship game. Offensive Coordinator Mike Johnson will serve as interim head coach at a bowl game.
- December 6, 2011 – UCLA becomes the first bowl-eligible team to lose a total of eight games in a season.
- December 10, 2011 – Jim L. Mora was named new head coach of the Bruins.
