= Vic Koenning =

American football player and coach (born 1960)

Current position
- Title: Defensive coordinator
- Team: Tuscaloosa County High School
- Conference: AHSAA

Biographical details
- Born: February 26, 1960 (age 66); Owasso, Oklahoma, U.S.

Playing career
- 1977–1981: Kansas State
- 1984: Oklahoma Outlaws
- 1985: Arizona Outlaws
- Position: Linebacker

Coaching career (HC unless noted)
- 1986–1990: Memphis State (GA)
- 1991–1996: Memphis State/Memphis (DB)
- 1997–1999: Wyoming (DC)
- 2000–2002: Wyoming
- 2003–2004: Troy (DC)
- 2005–2008: Clemson (DC/DB)
- 2009: Kansas State (AHC/co-DC/DB)
- 2010–2011: Illinois (DC)
- 2011: Illinois (interim HC)
- 2012–2014: North Carolina (AHC/S)
- 2015–2018: Troy (DC/S)
- 2019: West Virginia (DC)
- 2022–2023: Louisiana–Monroe (DC)
- 2024: Louisiana–Monroe (OLB)
- 2025–present: Tuscaloosa County HS (DC)

Head coaching record
- Overall: 6–29
- Bowls: 1–0

Victor Emanuel Koenning Jr. (born February 26, 1960) is a former professional American football player and coach who currently serves as the defensive coordinator at Tuscaloosa County HS. He was the interim head coach at the University of Illinois Urbana-Champaign in 2011 and was the head football coach at the University of Wyoming from 2000 to 2002, where he compiled a record of 5–29.

== Playing career ==
A three-year starter and team captain at Kansas State, Koenning was the recipient of the Paul Coffman Award, presented to the Wildcat who displays the most outstanding leadership. Koenning was third on the team with 93 total tackles as a senior.

After his collegiate career, he played two seasons (1984–1985) for the Oklahoma Outlaws of the United States Football League (USFL).

== Wyoming ==
Following the 1999 season, Koenning was promoted to head coach at Wyoming after Dana Dimel's departure to Houston. In his first season as head coach, numerous injuries, a poor defensive performance (allowing 35 points per game on average), and multiple blowout losses lead to a disappointing 1-10 season. In his second season, a young and inexperienced Cowboys team finished 2-9. In his third season, the Cowboys made some improvements, especially on offense, led by future National Football League players Casey Bramlet and Malcom Floyd. On October 26, 2002, Wyoming defeated Air Force. This was the only time Koenning defeated a Top 25 team as a head coach. However, the Cowboys once again continued to struggle. Koenning was fired at the end of the 2002 season. Wyoming's Athletic Director said about Koenning, "No one is questioning Vic's dedication and his work ethic. Unfortunately, sometimes those attributes do not necessarily translate into success." Koenning tenure at Wyoming ended with a 5-29 record, including 1-20 in Mountain West Conference play.

== Coaching career ==
Koenning started his college career as an assistant coach for the University of Memphis. After Wayne Bolt left Troy University following the 2002 season, Koenning was hired by Larry Blakeny as his replacement where Koenning led Troy to a Top-10 ranked defense in 2004.

In 2005 Koenning became defensive coordinator for the Clemson Tigers. Clemson ranked in the top 25 for scoring defense and total defense during his tenure. It was ninth in total defensive in 2007. Koenning resigned his position on December 2, 2008. Koenning's defense was the highlight of the Clemson 2008 season. He was hired at Kansas State by head coach Bill Snyder on December 8, 2008 to be assistant head coach and co-defensive coordinator (alongside Chris Cosh) at his alma mater. The K-state defense improved from 118 to 38 under Koenning.

On December 18, 2009, Ron Zook announced he hired Koenning as the defensive coordinator for the University of Illinois. He improved the Illini defense from 91st in the country in 2009, to 38th in 2010, and 7th in 2011. Illinois gave up just 291.8 yards per game and ranked fourth in the nation in pass defense, fifth in tackles for loss and ninth in sacks. After Zook was fired from Illinois at the end of the regular season, Illinois made Koenning the interim head coach for bowl game against UCLA in the Kraft Fight Hunger Bowl.

After Koenning led the Illini to a win in the Kraft Fight Hunger Bowl, he was the hired by the University of North Carolina at Chapel Hill as the assistant head coach and defensive coordinator. In his first season at North Carolina, his defense finished third in the nation in tackles for loss with more than eight per game. The defense that year only allowed a little over 25 points per game. In 2013, North Carolina improved dramatically over the second half of the season, securing wins in six of its last seven contests. In five of those games, North Carolina held its opponents to less than 20 points, including the 39–17 win over Cincinnati in the Belk Bowl. For the entire 2013 season, North Carolina allowed 24.3 points per game, which gave them the 48th-ranked scoring defense.

Koenning returned to Troy on December 17, 2014, when he was hired by new head coach Neal Brown as defensive coordinator for the Trojans. Koenning then followed Brown to West Virginia in 2019. Koenning was placed on administrative leave in June 2020 following allegations of player mistreatment. The following month, Koenning agreed to step down as the Mountaineers' defensive coordinator following an investigation by university officials.

In January 2022, Terry Bowden selected Koenning to serve as defensive coordinator at Louisiana–Monroe.

== Head coaching record ==
Year	Team	Overall	Conference	Standing	Bowl/playoffs
Wyoming Cowboys (Mountain West Conference) (2000–2002)
2000	Wyoming	1–10	0–7	9th	
2001	Wyoming	2–9	0–7	9th	
2002	Wyoming	2–10	1–6	9th	
Wyoming:		5–29	1–20		
Illinois Fighting Illini (Big Ten Conference) (2011)
2011	Illinois	1–0	0–0		W Kraft Fight Hunger
Illinois:		1–0	0–0		
Total:		6–29			
