= 2011 Kraft Fight Hunger Bowl (December) =

Illinois Fighting Illini	UCLA Bruins
(6–6)	(6–7)
Big Ten	Pac-12
20	14
Head coach: Vic Koenning (interim)	Head coach: Mike Johnson (interim)
	1	2	3	4	Total
Illinois	0	3	7	10	20
UCLA	0	7	0	7	14
- Date: December 31, 2011
- Season: 2011
- Stadium: AT&T Park
- Location: San Francisco, California
- MVP: Terry Hawthorne (Defensive); Nathan Scheelhaase (Offensive)
- Favorite: Illinois by 2½
- Referee: Jeff Hilyer (Sun Belt)
- Attendance: 29,878
- Payout: US$750,000–825,000 per team

United States TV coverage
- Network: ESPN
- Announcers: Carter Blackburn (Play-by-Play); Brock Huard (Analyst); Shelley Smith (Sidelines)
- Nielsen ratings: 2.3

The 2011 Kraft Fight Hunger Bowl, the 10th edition of the game, was a post-season American college football bowl game, held on December 31, 2011 at AT&T Park in San Francisco, California as part of the 2011–12 NCAA Bowl season.

The game, which was telecast at 12:30 p.m. Pacific Time (3:30 p.m. Eastern Time) on ESPN, featured the UCLA Bruins (6–7) versus the Illinois Fighting Illini (6–6). The Bruins, with a losing record, were granted a waiver to play in a bowl game by the NCAA after the Pac-12 conference did not have enough eligible teams to fill its bowl commitments. Both teams fired their head coaches that season after .500 regular season records. (Note: UCLA was 6–6 in the regular season before losing in the Pac-12 Championship Game.) Mike Johnson, who replaced Rick Neuheisel, is the interim coach for UCLA. The Fighting Illini were led by interim coach Vic Koenning while their newly hired head coach Tim Beckman, who replaced Ron Zook, was on the sidelines. UCLA lost and finished the season with a losing record (6–8).

== Teams ==
Since 1946, the two universities had met 11 times with three previous meetings in a bowl game (1947 Rose Bowl, 1984 Rose Bowl and 1991 Hancock Bowl). UCLA held a 6–5 edge over Illinois, including winning the last four games. The last game prior to this one was in 2004, when UCLA defeated Illinois 35–17.

=== Illinois ===
Illinois featured a pro style offense and a multiple defense. Jason Ford (155-600 yards, 7 TDs) and Nathan Scheelhaase (169-514 yards, 6 TDs) were the top rushers. Quarterback Nathan Scheelhaase had completed 166 of 261 passes for 1,971 yards, and 12 TDs coming into this game with receiver A.J. Jenkins (84-1, 196 yards, 7 TDs) as his target. Defensively, the team was led by Jonathan Brown (102 tackles), Whitney Mercilus (14.5 sacks, -95 yards) and Trulon Henry (2 interceptions, 27 yards, 1 TD) and Terry Hawthorne (2 interceptions).

=== UCLA ===
UCLA came into the game with its Pistol offense which allowed Johnathan Franklin to run for 947 yards, 5 TDs; quarterback Kevin Prince to pass 112 times for 1,627 yards and 10 TDs; Nelson Rasario to catch for 61 passes for 1,106 yards, 4 TDs. The Bruins' 4-3 defense was led by Pat Larimore (81 tackles), Datone Jones (3.0 sacks, 7 yards) and Andrew Abbott (4 interceptions, 37 yards).

== Scoring summary ==
First quarter scoring: No score

Second quarter scoring: UCLA – Taylor Embree 16-yard pass from Kevin Prince (Tyler Gonzalez kick); ILL – Derek Dimke 36-yard field goal

Third quarter scoring: ILL – T. Hawthorne 39-yard interception return (Dimke kick)

Fourth quarter scoring: ILL – Dimke 37-yard field goal; ILL – A. J. Jenkins 60-yard pass from N. Scheelhaase (Dimke kick); UCLA – Nelson Rosario 38-yard pass from Prince (Gonzalez kick),
