= Tim Kish =

American football player and coach (born 1954)

Biographical details
- Born: July 1, 1954 (age 72); Westerville, Ohio, U.S.

Playing career
- 1973–1976: Otterbein
- Position: Defensive back

Coaching career (HC unless noted)
- 1976–1977: Mariemont HS (OH) (assistant)
- 1978: Bowling Green (GA)
- 1979–1981: Purdue (assistant DB)
- 1982: Ball State (QB)
- 1983: Ball State (DL)
- 1984–1991: Army (DE/OLB)
- 1992–1996: Northwestern (DE/LB)
- 1997–2000: Illinois (DC/LB)
- 2001: Ohio (DC/LB)
- 2002–2003: Indiana (DC/LB)
- 2004–2006: Arizona (LB)
- 2007–2009: Arizona (assistant/LB)
- 2010: Arizona (co-DC/LB)
- 2011: Arizona (interim HC / DC / LB)
- 2012–2018: Oklahoma (ILB)

Head coaching record
- Overall: 3–3
- Bowls: 0–0

Tim Kish (born July 1, 1954) is a retired American football coach. Kish previously served as the defensive coordinator and linebackers coach at the University of Arizona before being promoted to interim head coach upon the firing of head coach Mike Stoops on October 10, 2011. He was succeeded as Arizona's head coach by Rich Rodriguez. Prior to his retirement at the end of the 2018 season, Kish served as linebackers coach for seven seasons at the University of Oklahoma.

== Coaching career ==
Kish was hired as Arizona's linebackers coach when Stoops was made head coach. He served in that capacity for three seasons until being promoted to assistant coach. In 2010, he was made co-defensive coordinator with Greg Brown and was made the sole defensive coordinator in 2011 when Brown left to take the same position at Colorado. After a 1–5 start to the season which extended Arizona's losing streak against FBS programs to ten games (the one win came against FCS Northern Arizona) Stoops was fired and Kish was promoted to interim head coach. In his first game as interim head coach, the Wildcats defeated UCLA, 48–12, 355 days after their last win over an FBS opponent, which also came against UCLA. Kish would lose the next three games on the schedule but closed out the conference slate by defeating the rival Arizona State Sun Devils in Tempe, reclaiming the Territorial Cup in the 85th Duel in the Desert. Two days later, Rich Rodriguez was named Arizona's new full-time head coach. Kish would finish the season with a 45-37 victory over Louisiana-Lafayette in his final game as head coach.

Kish was not retained on Rodriguez' new staff and was succeeded as defensive coordinator and linebackers coach by Jeff Casteel.

== Head coaching record ==
Year	Team	Overall	Conference	Standing
Arizona Wildcats (Pac-12 Conference) (2011)
2011	Arizona	3–3 (Note: Kish served as interim head coach after the firing of Mike Stoops six games into the season.)	2–3	T–5th (South)
Arizona:		3–3	2–3	
Total:		3–3		
