= 2011 Arizona Wildcats football team =

American college football season

2011 Arizona Wildcats football
- Conference: Pac-12 Conference
- South Division
- Record: 4–8 (2–7 Pac-12)
- Head coach: Mike Stoops (8th season; first 6 games); Tim Kish (interim; remainder of season)
- Offensive coordinator: Seth Littrell (1st season)
- Offensive scheme: Air raid
- Defensive coordinator: Tim Kish (1st season)
- Base defense: 3–4
- Home stadium: Arizona Stadium

2011 Pac-12 Conference football standings
	Conf.			Overall
Team	W		L	W		L
North Division
No. 4 Oregon xy$	8	–	1	12	–	2
No. 7 Stanford x%	8	–	1	11	–	2
Washington	5	–	4	7	–	6
California	4	–	5	7	–	6
Oregon State	3	–	6	3	–	9
Washington State	2	–	7	4	–	8
South Division
No. 6 USC †	7	–	2	10	–	2
UCLA xy	5	–	4	6	–	8
Utah	4	–	5	8	–	5
Arizona State	4	–	5	6	–	7
Arizona	2	–	7	4	–	8
Colorado	2	–	7	3	–	10
Championship: Oregon 49, UCLA 31
$ – BCS representative as conference champion; % – BCS at-large representative; x – Division champion/co-champions; y – Championship game participant; † – USC ineligible for championship and postseason due to NCAA sanctions; Rankings from AP Poll

The 2011 Arizona Wildcats football team represented the University of Arizona in the 2011 NCAA Division I FBS football season. The team played their home games in Arizona Stadium in Tucson, Arizona. This was the first year for Arizona in the newly reconfigured Pac-12 Conference; they played in the Pac-12 South Division. They finished the season 4–8, 2–7 in Pac-12 play.

The team was coached by interim head coach Tim Kish for the last six games of the season after eighth-year head coach Mike Stoops was fired as head coach on October 10 after starting the season 1–5 (their sole victory was against FCS Northern Arizona). Including the previous season, the Wildcats under Stoops had lost 10 consecutive games against FBS opponents, with their last victory over a FBS team taking place nearly a year earlier on October 30, 2010, against UCLA. Kish, the team's defensive coordinator, was named interim head coach for the remainder of the season. Kish finished the season 3–3, including a Duel in the Desert victory over Arizona State to reclaim the Territorial Cup. Rich Rodriguez was named the Wildcats' new full-time head coach starting in 2012.

== Schedule ==
Date	Time	Opponent	Site	TV	Result	Attendance
September 3	7:00 p.m.	Northern Arizona*	Arizona Stadium; Tucson, AZ	FSAZ	W 41–10	51,761
September 8	5:00 p.m.	at No. 9 Oklahoma State*	Boone Pickens Stadium; Stillwater, OK	ESPN	L 14–37	54,654
September 17	7:45 p.m.	No. 6 Stanford	Arizona Stadium; Tucson, AZ	ESPN	L 10–37	49,636
September 24	7:15 p.m.	No. 10 Oregon	Arizona Stadium; Tucson, AZ	ESPN2	L 31–56	56,096
October 1	12:30 p.m.	at USC	Los Angeles Memorial Coliseum; Los Angeles, CA	FSN	L 41–48	63,707
October 8	12:30 p.m.	at Oregon State	Reser Stadium; Corvallis, OR	FCS Pacific	L 27–37	40,403
October 20	6:00 p.m.	UCLA	Arizona Stadium; Tucson, AZ	ESPN	W 48–12	46,565
October 29	7:30 p.m.	at Washington	Husky Stadium; Seattle, WA	FSN	L 31–42	59,825
November 5	5:00 p.m.	Utah^{†}	Arizona Stadium; Tucson, AZ	FCS	L 21–34	50,389
November 12	11:30 a.m.	at Colorado	Folsom Field; Boulder, CO	FCS	L 29–48	48,111
November 19	7:30 p.m.	at Arizona State	Sun Devil Stadium; Tempe, AZ (Territorial Cup)	FSAZ	W 31–27	72,694
November 26	2:00 p.m.	Louisiana–Lafayette*	Arizona, Stadium; Tucson, AZ		W 45–37	38,819
*Non-conference game; ^{†}Homecoming; Rankings from AP Poll released prior to the game; All times are in Mountain time

== Roster ==
2011 Arizona Wildcats football team roster
Players
Coaches
Offense

Pos.	#	Name	Class
RB	2	Keola Antolin	Sr
WR	15	Dan Buckner	Jr
RB	25	Ka'Deem Carey	Fr
WR	82	Juron Criner	Sr
WR	85	David Douglas	Sr
QB	8	Nick Foles	Sr
WR	12	Patrick Onwuasor	Fr
QB	4	Matt Scott	Jr
WR	11	Tyler Slavin	Fr

Defense

Pos.	#	Name	Class
S	2	Marquis Flowers	So
CB	5	Shaquille Richardson	So
CB	13	Trevin Wade	Sr
DL	91	Sione Tuihalamaka	So

Special teams

Pos.	#	Name	Class

Head coach

- Mike Stoops
  Tim Kish

Coordinators/assistant coaches

- Ryan Walters
  Defensive backs coach
- Robert Anae
  Run game coordinator/ offensive line coach
- Seth Littrell
  Offensive coordinator/ tight ends/ running backs coach
- Frank Scelfo
  Quarterbacks coach
- Brian Odom
  Associate director of performance enhancement

Legend

- (C) Team captain
- (S) Suspended
- (I) Ineligible
- Injured
- Redshirt

== Game summaries ==
=== vs Northern Arizona ===
Northern Arizona Lumberjacks (0–0) vs Arizona Wildcats (0–0) – Game summary

Quarter	1	2	3	4	Total
Lumberjacks	0	10	0	0	10
Wildcats	14	0	20	7	41

at Arizona Stadium • Tucson, AZ

- Date: September 3, 2011
- Game time: 7:00 p.m.
- Game weather: Clear, 95 °F (35 °C)
- Game attendance: 51,761
- Referee: Michael Mothershed
- TV: Fox Sports Arizona

Game information

First quarter

- (12:35) ARIZ – Juron Criner 10-yard pass from Nick Foles, Jaime Salazar kick (Drive: 3 plays, 54 yards, 0:47; Arizona 7–0)
- (0:02) ARIZ – Taimi Tutogi 5-yard run, Jaime Salazar kick (Drive: 7 plays, 52 yards, 2:16; Arizona 14–0)

Second quarter

- (7:39) NAU – Matt Myers 28-yard field goal (Drive: 13 plays, 64 yards, 7:23; Arizona 14–3)
- (0:25) NAU – Khalil Paden 12-yard pass from Cary Grossart, Matt Myers kick (Drive: 9 plays, 91 yards, 3:59; Arizona 14–10)

Third quarter

- (13:07) ARIZ – Keola Antolin 18-yard pass from Nick Foles, Jaime Salazar kick (Drive: 1 play, 18 yards, 0:09; Arizona 21–10)
- (3:10) ARIZ – Richard Morrison 24-yard pass from Nick Foles, Jaime Salazar kick (Drive: 5 plays, 85 yards, 1:36; Arizona 28–10)
- (0:35) ARIZ – Austin Hill 24-yard pass from Nick Foles, kick failed (Drive: 5 plays, 59 yards, 1:22; Arizona 34–10)

Fourth quarter

- (9:26) ARIZ – Gino Crump 18-yard pass from Nick Foles, Alex Zendejas kick (Drive: 10 plays, 63 yards, 4:36; Arizona 41–10)

Statistics	NAU	ARIZ
First downs	16	24
Total yards	259	487
Rushing yards	33–80	20–75
Passing yards	179	412
Passing: Comp–Att–Int	20–26–1	34–42–0
Time of possession	36:13	23:47

Team	Category	Player	Statistics
Northern Arizona	Passing	Cary Grossart	20/26, 179 yards, TD, INT
Northern Arizona	Rushing	Zach Bauman	27 carries, 99 yards
Northern Arizona	Receiving	Ify Umodu	7 receptions, 90 yards
Arizona	Passing	Nick Foles	34/42, 412 yards, 5 TD
Arizona	Rushing	Ka'Deem Carey	9 carries, 59 yards
Arizona	Receiving	Juron Criner	6 receptions, 151 yards, TD

=== at No. 9 Oklahoma State ===
Arizona Wildcats (1–0) at No. 9 Oklahoma State Cowboys (0–1) – Game summary

Quarter	1	2	3	4	Total
Wildcats	0	0	7	7	14
#9 Cowboys	14	7	6	10	37

at Boone Pickens Stadium • Stillwater, OK

- Date: September 8, 2011
- Game time: 5:00 p.m.
- Game weather: Sunny, 81 °F (27 °C)
- Game attendance: 54,654
- Referee: Scott Novak
- TV: ESPN

Game information

First quarter

- (11:30) OKST – Joseph Randle 1-yard run, Quinn Sharp kick (Drive: 9 plays, 88 yards, 3:30; Oklahoma State 7–0)
- (2:54) OKST – Justin Blackmon 3-yard pass from Brandon Weeden, Quinn Sharp kick (Drive: 12 plays, 80 yards, 4:34; Oklahoma State 14–0)

Second quarter

- (13:30) OKST – Joseph Randle 4-yard run, Quinn Sharp kick (Drive: 10 plays, 70 yards, 3:06; Oklahoma State 21–0)

Third quarter

- (7:38) ARIZ – Keola Antolin 1-yard run, Jaime Salazar kick (Drive: 10 plays, 71 yards, 4:10; Oklahoma State 21–7)
- (0:30) OKST – Justin Blackmon 3-yard pass from Brandon Weeden, kick failed (Drive: 6 plays, 38 yards, 2:12; Oklahoma State 27–7)

Fourth quarter

- (12:32) OKST – Jeremy Smith 6-yard run, Quinn Sharp kick (Drive: 4 plays, 73 yards, 1:06; Oklahoma State 34–7)
- (10:03) ARIZ – Dan Buckner 54-yard pass from Nick Foles, Jaime Salazar kick (Drive: 6 plays, 78 yards, 2:29; Oklahoma State 34–14)
- (3:03) OKST – Quinn Sharp 18-yard field goal (Drive: 15 plays, 78 yards, 7:00; Oklahoma State 37–14)

Statistics	ARIZ	OKST
First downs	21	25
Total yards	439	594
Rushing yards	21–41	31–197
Passing yards	398	397
Passing: Comp–Att–Int	37–51–0	42–53–1
Time of possession	28:38	31:22

Team	Category	Player	Statistics
Arizona	Passing	Nick Foles	37/51, 398 yards, TD
Arizona	Rushing	Keola Antolin	13 carries, 22 yards, TD
Arizona	Receiving	Dan Buckner	10 receptions, 142 yards, TD
Oklahoma State	Passing	Brandon Weeden	42/53, 397 yards, 2 TD, INT
Oklahoma State	Rushing	Joseph Randle	15 carries, 121 yards, 2 TD
Oklahoma State	Receiving	Justin Blackmon	12 receptions, 128 yards, 2 TD

This game was a rematch of the 2010 Alamo Bowl, just nine months earlier, which Oklahoma State won 36–10.

=== vs No. 6 Stanford ===
No. 6 Stanford Cardinal (2–0) vs Arizona Wildcats (1–1) – Game summary

Quarter	1	2	3	4	Total
#6 Cardinal	10	6	7	14	37
Wildcats	0	10	0	0	10

at Arizona Stadium • Tucson, AZ

- Date: September 17, 2011
- Game time: 7:45 p.m.
- Game weather: Clear, 78 °F (26 °C)
- Game attendance: 49,636
- Referee: Michael Batlan
- TV: ESPN

Game information

First quarter

- (6:11) STAN – Jordan Williamson 20-yard field goal (Drive: 9 plays, 57 yards, 3:29; Stanford 3–0)
- (1:59) STAN – Anthony Wilkerson 24-yard run, Jordan Williamson kick (Drive: 5 plays, 72 yards, 2:08; Stanford 10–0)

Second quarter

- (14:15) ARIZ – Jaime Salazar 27-yard field goal (Drive: 7 plays, 69 yards, 2:38; Stanford 10–3)
- (9:42) STAN – Jordan Williamson 45-yard field goal (Drive: 8 plays, 64 yards, 4:26; Stanford 13–3)
- (5:57) ARIZ – Juron Criner 6-yard pass from Nick Foles, Jaime Salazar kick (Drive: 11 plays, 79 yards, 3:45; Stanford 13–10)
- (1:22) STAN – Jordan Williamson 33-yard field goal (Drive: 10 plays, 65 yards, 4:35; Stanford 16–10)

Third quarter

- (5:22) STAN – Zach Ertz 16-yard pass from Andrew Luck, Jordan Williamson kick (Drive: 7 plays, 81 yards, 3:26; Stanford 23–10)

Fourth quarter

- (14:54) STAN – Levine Toilolo 34-yard pass from Andrew Luck, Jordan Williamson kick (Drive: 8 plays, 80 yards, 3:00; Stanford 30–10)
- (4:27) STAN – Jeremy Stewart 2-yard run, Jordan Williamson kick (Drive: 12 plays, 91 yards, 6:55; Stanford 37–10)

Statistics	STAN	ARIZ
First downs	24	19
Total yards	567	333
Rushing yards	39–242	23–51
Passing yards	325	282
Passing: Comp–Att–Int	20–31–0	28–39–0
Time of possession	35:48	24:12

Team	Category	Player	Statistics
Stanford	Passing	Andrew Luck	20/31, 325 yards, 2 TD
Stanford	Rushing	Stepfan Taylor	22 carries, 153 yards
Stanford	Receiving	Levine Toilolo	4 receptions, 102 yards, TD
Arizona	Passing	Nick Foles	24/33, 239 yards, TD
Arizona	Rushing	Keola Antolin	9 carries, 69 yards
Arizona	Receiving	Dan Buckner	4 receptions, 71 yards

=== vs No. 10 Oregon ===
No. 10 Oregon Ducks (2–1) vs Arizona Wildcats (1–2) – Game summary

Quarter	1	2	3	4	Total
#10 Ducks	14	21	7	14	56
Wildcats	3	6	15	7	31

at Arizona Stadium • Tucson, AZ

- Date: September 24, 2011
- Game time: 7:15 p.m.
- Game weather: High clouds 88 °F (31 °C)
- Game attendance: 56,096
- Referee: Land Clark
- TV: ESPN2

Game information

First quarter

- (12:18) ORE – LaMichael James 12-yard run, Alejandro Maldonado kick (Drive: 8 plays, 80 yards, 2:42; Oregon 7–0)
- (7:58) ORE – Kenjon Barner 8-yard run, Alejandro Maldonado kick (Drive: 10 plays, 72 yards, 2:19; Oregon 14–0)
- (0:30) ARIZ – Alex Zendejas 28-yard field goal (Drive: 13 plays, 61 yards, 5:02; Oregon 14–3)

Second quarter

- (13:24) ORE – David Paulson 10-yard pass from Darron Thomas, Alejandro Maldonado kick (Drive: 8 plays, 80 yards, 2:06; Oregon 21–3)
- (5:18) ORE – Kenjon Barner 6-yard pass from Darron Thomas, Alejandro Maldonado kick (Drive: 6 plays, 55 yards, 2:02; Oregon 28–3)
- (2:45) ORE – LaMichael James 19-yard run, Alejandro Maldonado kick (Drive: 4 plays, 28 yards, 1:38; Oregon 35–3)
- (1:04) ARIZ – Richard Morrison 34-yard pass from Nick Foles, kick failed (Drive: 8 plays, 81 yards, 1:34; Oregon 35–9)

Third quarter

- (10:30) ARIZ – Keola Antolin 7-yard run, Alex Zendejas kick (Drive: 12 plays, 74 yards, 4:25; Oregon 35–16)
- (5:43) ARIZ – David Roberts 7-yard pass from Nick Foles, Nick Foles two-point pass to David Douglas (Drive: 9 plays, 65 yards, 3:14; Oregon 35–24)
- (3:19) ORE – Darron Thomas 5-yard run, Alejandro Maldonado kick (Drive: 8 plays, 75 yards, 2:15; Oregon 42–24)

Fourth quarter

- (9:55) ORE – Kenjon Barner 1-yard run, Alejandro Maldonado kick (Drive: 5 plays, 78 yards, 2:29; Oregon 49–24)
- (6:29) ARIZ – David Roberts 4-yard pass from Nick Foles, Alex Zendejas kick (Drive: 10 plays, 75 yards, 3:19; Oregon 49–31)
- (1:45) ORE – Darron Thomas 2-yard run, Alejandro Maldonado kick (Drive: 7 plays, 43 yards, 4:43; Oregon 56–31)

Statistics	ORE	ARIZ
First downs	29	26
Total yards	516	480
Rushing yards	47–415	35–82
Passing yards	101	398
Passing: Comp–Att–Int	11–20–0	34–57–0
Time of possession	25:14	34:46

Team	Category	Player	Statistics
Oregon	Passing	Darron Thomas	11/20, 101 yards, 2 TD
Oregon	Rushing	LaMichael James	23 carries, 288 yards, 2 TD
Oregon	Receiving	David Paulson	3 receptions, 22 yards, TD
Arizona	Passing	Nick Foles	34/57, 398 yards, 3 TD
Arizona	Rushing	Keola Antolin	13 carries, 55 yards, TD
Arizona	Receiving	David Douglas	7 receptions, 120 yards

Oregon's 56 points is the most points Arizona has allowed at home since LSU scored 59 points in 2003 at Arizona Stadium.

=== at USC ===
Arizona Wildcats (1–3) at USC Trojans (3–1) – Game summary

Quarter	1	2	3	4	Total
Wildcats	0	12	15	14	41
Trojans	17	10	7	14	48

at Los Angeles Memorial Coliseum • Los Angeles, CA

- Date: October 1, 2011
- Game time: 12:30 p.m.
- Game weather: Sunny, 85 °F (29 °C)
- Game attendance: 63,707
- Referee: Jay Stricherz
- TV: FSN

Game information

First quarter

- (10:49) USC – Robert Woods 82-yard pass from Matt Barkley, Andre Heidari kick (Drive: 2 plays, 91 yards, 0:48; USC 7–0)
- (3:58) USC – Andre Heidari 46-yard field goal (Drive: 7 plays, 41 yards, 3:21; USC 10–0)
- (0:40) USC – Marqise Lee 38-yard pass from Matt Barkley, Andre Heidari kick (Drive: 3 plays, 60 yards, 1:11; USC 17–0)

Second quarter

- (10:53) ARIZ – Taimi Tutogi 4-yard pass from Nick Foles, kick failed (Drive: 12 plays, 75 yards, 4:40; USC 17–6)
- (5:45) USC – Xavier Grimble 7-yard pass from Matt Barkley, Andre Heidari kick (Drive: 10 plays, 73 yards, 5:03; USC 24–6)
- (4:05) ARIZ – Ka'Deem Carey 27-yard pass from Nick Foles, kick failed (Drive: 4 plays, 60 yards, 1:40; USC 24–12)
- (0:00) USC – Andre Heidari 31-yard field goal (Drive: 15 plays, 65 yards, 4:05; USC 27–12)

Third quarter

- (12:57) USC – Robert Woods 28-yard pass from Matt Barkley, Andre Heidari kick (Drive: 5 plays, 67 yards, 2:03; USC 34–12)
- (4:22) ARIZ – Ka'Deem Carey 1-yard run, Nick Foles two-point pass to Austin Hill (Drive: 18 plays, 93 yards, 8:34; USC 34–20)
- (0:52) ARIZ – Ka'Deem Carey 16-yard run, Alex Zendejas kick (Drive: 6 plays, 59 yards, 2:15; USC 34–27)

Fourth quarter

- (14:39) USC – Matt Barkley 1-yard run, Andre Heidari kick (Drive: 4 plays, 70 yards, 1:04; USC 41–27)
- (11:09) ARIZ – Juron Criner 12-yard pass from Nick Foles, Alex Zendejas kick (Drive: 5 plays, 79 yards, 1:36; USC 41–34)
- (9:28) USC – Curtis McNeal 9-yard run, Andre Heidari kick (Drive: 5 plays, 79 yards, 1:36; USC 48–34)
- (1:00) ARIZ – Austin Hill 4-yard pass from Nick Foles, Alex Zendejas kick (Drive: 6 plays, 53 yards, 0:51; USC 48–41)

Statistics	ARIZ	USC
First downs	37	26
Total yards	554	582
Rushing yards	33–129	25–114
Passing yards	425	468
Passing: Comp–Att–Int	41–53–2	32–39–1
Time of possession	33:50	26:10

Team	Category	Player	Statistics
Arizona	Passing	Nick Foles	41/53, 425 yards, 4 TD, 2 INT
Arizona	Rushing	Keola Antolin	15 carries, 87 yards
Arizona	Receiving	Dan Buckner	6 receptions, 88 yards
USC	Passing	Matt Barkley	32/39, 468 yards, 4 TD, INT
USC	Rushing	Curtis McNeal	7 carries, 74 yards, TD
USC	Receiving	Robert Woods	14 receptions, 255 yards, 2 TD

=== at Oregon State ===
Arizona Wildcats (1–4) at Oregon State Beavers (0–4) – Game summary

Quarter	1	2	3	4	Total
Wildcats	0	6	14	7	27
Beavers	0	27	3	7	37

at Reser Stadium • Corvallis, OR

- Date: October 8, 2011
- Game time: 12:30 p.m.
- Game weather: Cloudy, 59 °F (15 °C)
- Game attendance: 40,403
- Referee: Terry Leyden
- TV: FCS Pacific

Game information

First quarter

No scoring plays

Second quarter

- (11:38) OSU – Jovan Stevenson 1-yard run, Trevor Romaine kick (Drive: 17 plays, 92 yards, 8:48; Oregon State 7–0)
- (8:46) OSU – Clayton York 41-yard blocked punt return, Trevor Romaine kick (Oregon State 14–0)
- (6:24) ARIZ – Dan Buckner 28-yard pass from Nick Foles, kick failed (Drive: 7 plays, 80 yards, 2:32; Oregon State 14–6)
- (2:26) OSU – Trevor Romaine 37-yard field goal (Drive: 11 plays, 51 yards, 3:57; Oregon State 17–6)
- (0:16) OSU – Joe Halahuni 3-yard pass from Sean Mannion, Trevor Romaine kick (Drive: 6 plays, 39 yards, 1:27; Oregon State 24–6)
- (0:00) OSU – Trevor Romaine 40-yard field goal (Drive: 2 plays, 13 yards, 0:13; Oregon State 27–6)

Third quarter

- (7:28) OSU – Trevor Romaine 20-yard field goal (Drive: 9 plays, 76 yards, 3:49; Oregon State 30–6)
- (4:45) ARIZ – Keola Antolin 13-yard run, Nick Foles two-point pass to David Douglas (Drive: 8 plays, 83 yards, 2:43; Oregon State 30–14)
- (4:37) ARIZ – Shaquille Richardson 28-yard interception return, two-point pass failed (Oregon State 30–20)

Fourth quarter

- (11:56) ARIZ – Ka'Deem Carey 1-yard run, John Bonano kick (Drive: 10 plays, 75 yards, 3:42; Oregon State 30–27)
- (5:22) OSU – Joe Halahuni 2-yard pass from Sean Mannion, Trevor Romaine kick (Drive: 9 plays, 43 yards, 4:05; Oregon State 37–27)

Statistics	ARIZ	OSU
First downs	23	22
Total yards	431	408
Rushing yards	19–53	35–128
Passing yards	378	280
Passing: Comp–Att–Int	31–45–2	33–43–2
Time of possession	24:07	35:53

Team	Category	Player	Statistics
Arizona	Passing	Nick Foles	31/45, 378 yards, TD, 2 INT
Arizona	Rushing	Keola Antolin	6 carries, 28 yards, TD
Arizona	Receiving	Dan Buckner	8 receptions, 144 yards, TD
Oregon State	Passing	Sean Mannion	32/41, 267 yards, 2 TD, 2 INT
Oregon State	Rushing	Jovan Stevenson	17 carries, 99 yards, TD
Oregon State	Receiving	Markus Wheaton	6 receptions, 54 yards

=== vs UCLA ===
UCLA Bruins (3–3) vs Arizona Wildcats (1–5) – Game summary

Quarter	1	2	3	4	Total
Bruins	7	0	0	5	12
Wildcats	14	28	3	3	48

at Arizona Stadium • Tucson, AZ

- Date: October 20, 2011
- Game time: 6:00 p.m.
- Game weather: Clear, 88 °F (31 °C)
- Game attendance: 46,565
- Referee: Jack Folliard
- TV: ESPN

Game information

First quarter

- (12:43) ARIZ – Juron Criner 4-yard pass from Nick Foles, John Bonano kick (Drive: 8 plays, 80 yards, 2:17; Arizona 7–0)
- (7:38) ARIZ – Ka'Deem Carey 18-yard run, John Bonano kick (Drive: 10 plays, 76 yards, 3:32; Arizona 14–0)
- (2:53) UCLA – Johnathan Franklin 16-yard pass from Kevin Prince, Tyler Gonzalez kick (Drive: 10 plays, 73 yards, 4:40; Arizona 14–7)

Second quarter

- (14:31) ARIZ – Juron Criner 7-yard pass from Nick Foles, John Bonano kick (Drive: 10 plays, 80 yards, 3:22; Arizona 21–7)
- (9:24) ARIZ – Taimi Tutogi 1-yard run, John Bonano kick (Drive: 8 plays, 63 yards, 3:33; Arizona 28–7)
- (3:29) ARIZ – Juron Criner 25-yard pass from Nick Foles, John Bonano kick (Drive: 10 plays, 79 yards, 3:14; Arizona 35–7)
- (1:09) ARIZ – Taimi Tutogi 8-yard run, John Bonano kick (Drive: 5 plays, 59 yards, 2:03; Arizona 42–7)

Third quarter

- (3:15) ARIZ – John Bonano 41-yard field goal (Drive: 10 plays, 48 yards, 3:22; Arizona 45–7)

Fourth quarter

- (10:28) ARIZ – John Bonano 22-yard field goal (Drive: 11 plays, 51 yards, 4:15; Arizona 48–7)
- (6:34) UCLA – Glenn Love safety (Arizona 48–9)
- (4:17) UCLA – Tyler Gonzalez 42-yard field goal (Drive: 8 plays, 32 yards, 2:15; Arizona 48–12)

Statistics	UCLA	ARIZ
First downs	15	32
Total yards	323	573
Rushing yards	25–37	46–254
Passing yards	286	319
Passing: Comp–Att–Int	17–35–0	28–44–1
Time of possession	24:13	35:47

Team	Category	Player	Statistics
UCLA	Passing	Kevin Prince	17/35, 286 yards, TD
UCLA	Rushing	Derrick Coleman	5 carries, 15 yards
UCLA	Receiving	Nelson Rosario	4 receptions, 78 yards
Arizona	Passing	Nick Foles	26/39, 291 yards, 3 TD, INT
Arizona	Rushing	Keola Antolin	8 carries, 77 yards
Arizona	Receiving	Gino Crump	9 receptions, 103 yards

This was Tim Kish's first game as head coach for Arizona. Before halftime, a streaker dressed as a referee and ran off the field, and a fight ensued, leading to two players being ejected and four Arizona players being suspended.

=== at Washington ===
Arizona Wildcats (2–5) at Washington Huskies (5–2) – Game summary

Quarter	1	2	3	4	Total
Wildcats	10	3	15	3	31
Huskies	0	14	14	14	42

at Husky Stadium • Seattle, WA

- Date: October 29, 2011
- Game time: 7:30 p.m.
- Game weather: Mostly cloudy, 52 °F (11 °C)
- Game attendance: 59,825
- Referee: Jack Wood
- TV: FSN

Game information

First quarter

- (10:58) ARIZ – John Bonano 36-yard field goal (Drive: 8 plays, 50 yards, 4:02; Arizona 3–0)
- (6:29) ARIZ – Juron Criner 24-yard pass from Nick Foles, John Bonano kick (Drive: 8 plays, 66 yards, 2:22; Arizona 10–0)

Second quarter

- (12:51) WASH – Jermaine Kearse 6-yard run, Erik Folk kick (Drive: 12 plays, 80 yards, 4:31; Arizona 10–7)
- (9:43) ARIZ – John Bonano 47-yard field goal (Drive: 7 plays, 39 yards, 2:58; Arizona 13–7)
- (6:16) WASH – Chris Polk 1-yard run, Erik Folk kick (Drive: 8 plays, 59 yards, 3:20; Washington 14–13)

Third quarter

- (13:11) WASH – Chris Polk 17-yard pass from Keith Price, Erik Folk kick (Drive: 3 plays, 50 yards, 1:40; Washington 21–13)
- (10:40) ARIZ – Robert Golden 91-yard interception return, Nick Foles two-point pass to David Douglas (Tied 21–21)
- (5:34) WASH – Chris Polk 1-yard run, Erik Folk kick (Drive: 12 plays, 76 yards, 4:57; Washington 28–21)
- (3:41) ARIZ – Juron Criner 9-yard pass from Nick Foles, John Bonano kick (Drive: 4 plays, 65 yards, 1:44; Tied 28–28)

Fourth quarter

- (14:10) ARIZ – John Bonano 24-yard field goal (Drive: 9 plays, 64 yards, 3:32; Arizona 31–28)
- (8:21) WASH – Chris Polk 5-yard run, Erik Folk kick (Drive: 6 plays, 81 yards, 2:20; Washington 35–31)
- (3:59) WASH – Chris Polk 2-yard run, Erik Folk kick (Drive: 6 plays, 50 yards, 3:15; Washington 42–31)

Statistics	ARIZ	WASH
First downs	25	24
Total yards	424	489
Rushing yards	19–36	43–179
Passing yards	388	310
Passing: Comp–Att–Int	32–50–3	17–31–3
Time of possession	27:43	32:17

Team	Category	Player	Statistics
Arizona	Passing	Nick Foles	32/50, 388 yards, 2 TD, 3 INT
Arizona	Rushing	Keola Antolin	9 carries, 27 yards
Arizona	Receiving	Juron Criner	11 receptions, 118 yards, 2 TD
Washington	Passing	Keith Price	16/30, 277 yards, TD, 3 INT
Washington	Rushing	Chris Polk	34 carries, 144 yards, 4 TD
Washington	Receiving	Chris Polk	4 receptions, 100 yards, TD

=== vs No. Utah ===
Utah Utes (4–4) vs Arizona Wildcats (2–6) – Game summary

Quarter	1	2	3	4	Total
Utes	3	17	7	7	34
Wildcats	0	7	7	7	21

at Arizona Stadium • Tucson, AZ

- Date: November 5, 2011
- Game time: 5:00 p.m.
- Game weather: Sunny, 59 °F (15 °C)
- Game attendance: 51,839
- Referee: Shawn Hochuli
- TV: Fox College Sports

Game information

First quarter

- (6:08) UTAH – Colem Peterson 33-yard field goal (Drive: 4 plays, 6 yards, 1:26; Utah 3–0)

Second quarter

- (14:18) UTAH – DeVonte Christopher 65-yard pass from Jon Hays, Colem Peterson kick (Drive: 5 plays, 90 yards, 2:13; Utah 10–0)
- (11:41) UTAH – John White 18-yard run, Colem Peterson kick (Drive: 4 plays, 30 yards, 1:45; Utah 17–0)
- (3:45) ARIZ – David Douglas 23-yard pass from Nick Foles, John Bonano kick (Drive: 7 plays, 73 yards, 3:20; Utah 17–7)
- (0:00) UTAH – Colem Peterson 35-yard field goal (Drive: 7 plays, 41 yards, 1:32; Utah 20–7)

Third quarter

- (12:21) UTAH – Reggie Dunn 44-yard pass from Jon Hays, Colem Peterson kick (Drive: 7 plays, 92 yards, 2:39; Utah 27–7)
- (5:02) ARIZ – David Douglas 42-yard pass from Nick Foles, John Bonano kick (Drive: 5 plays, 71 yards, 1:40; Utah 27–14)

Fourth quarter

- (2:50) UTAH – John White 11-yard run, Colem Peterson kick (Drive: 7 plays, 43 yards, 4:39; Utah 34–14)
- (8:02) ARIZ – Daniel Jenkins 29-yard run, John Bonano kick (Drive: 9 plays, 88 yards, 2:20; Utah 34–21)

Statistics	UTAH	ARIZ
First downs	20	28
Total yards	332	457
Rushing yards	40–133	32–131
Passing yards	199	326
Passing: Comp–Att–Int	12–21–0	25–43–2
Time of possession	30:34	29:26

Team	Category	Player	Statistics
UTAH	Passing	Jon Hays	12/21, 199 yards, 2 TD
UTAH	Rushing	John White	27 carries, 109 yards, 2 TD
UTAH	Receiving	DeVonte Christopher	3 receptions, 79 yards, TD
Arizona	Passing	Nick Foles	25/43, 326 yards, 2 TD, 2 INT
Arizona	Rushing	Daniel Jenkins	6 carries, 57 yards, TD
Arizona	Receiving	David Douglas	10 receptions, 156 yards, 2 TD

=== at Colorado ===
Arizona Wildcats (2–7) at Colorado Buffaloes (1–9) – Game summary

Quarter	1	2	3	4	Total
Wildcats	3	7	7	12	29
Buffaloes	7	13	14	14	48

at Folsom Field • Boulder, Colorado

- Date: November 12, 2011
- Game time: 11:30 a.m.
- Game weather: Partly cloudy, 57 °F (14 °C)
- Game attendance: 48,111
- Referee: Jay Stricherz
- TV: Fox College Sports

Game information

First quarter

- (10:56) COLO – Rodney Stewart 5-yard run, Will Oliver kick (Drive: 6 plays, 80 yards, 2:34; Colorado 7–0)
- (4:15) ARIZ – John Bonano 25-yard field goal (Drive: 11 plays, 60 yards, 6:34; Colorado 7–3)

Second quarter

- (13:18) COLO – Tony Jones 5-yard pass from Tyler Hansen, kick failed (Drive: 12 plays, 80 yards, 5:57; Colorado 13–3)
- (6:28) ARIZ – Ka'Deem Carey 1-yard run, John Bonano kick (Drive: 7 plays, 65 yards, 3:22; Colorado 13–10)
- (2:12) COLO – Josh Ford 17-yard run, Will Oliver kick (Drive: 3 plays, 28 yards, 1:14; Colorado 20–10)

Third quarter

- (10:26) COLO – Toney Clemons 15-yard pass from Tyler Hansen, Will Oliver kick (Drive: 11 plays, 80 yards, 4:34; Colorado 27–10)
- (3:50) COLO – Tyler Hansen 14-yard pass from Rodney Stewart, Will Oliver kick (Drive: 6 plays, 60 yards, 2:21; Colorado 34–10)
- (0:11) ARIZ – Tra'Mayne Bondurant 29-yard interception return, John Bonano kick (Colorado 34–17)

Fourth quarter

- (10:33) ARIZ – David Douglas 11-yard pass from Nick Foles, two-point pass failed (Drive: 7 plays, 88 yards, 1:41; Colorado 34–23)
- (7:42) COLO – Rodney Stewart 11-yard run, Will Oliver kick (Drive: 6 plays, 80 yards, 2:51; Colorado 41–23)
- (4:14) ARIZ – Ka'Deem Carey 2-yard run, two-point pass failed (Drive: 12 plays, 50 yards, 3:20; Colorado 41–29)
- (1:45) COLO – Rodney Stewart 9-yard run, Will Oliver kick (Drive: 7 plays, 53 yards, 2:18; Colorado 48–23)

Statistics	ARIZ	COLO
First downs	23	27
Total yards	412	500
Rushing yards	23–60	45–273
Passing yards	352	227
Passing: Comp–Att–Int	35–53–3	17–27–1
Time of possession	27:08	32:52

Team	Category	Player	Statistics
Arizona	Passing	Nick Foles	35/53, 352 yards, TD, 3 INT
Arizona	Rushing	Keola Antolin	7 carries, 42 yards
Arizona	Receiving	Gino Crump	10 receptions, 95 yards
Colorado	Passing	Tyler Hansen	16/26, 213 yards, 2 TD, INT
Colorado	Rushing	Rodney Stewart	24 carries, 181 yards, 3 TD
Colorado	Receiving	Toney Clemons	5 receptions, 115 yards, TD

=== at Arizona State ===
Arizona Wildcats (2–8) at Arizona State Sun Devils (6–4) – Game summary

Quarter	1	2	3	4	Total
Wildcats	14	3	0	14	31
Sun Devils	7	14	3	3	27

at Sun Devil Stadium • Tempe, Arizona

- Date: November 29, 2011
- Game time: 7:30 p.m.
- Game weather: Clear, 68 °F (20 °C)
- Game attendance: 72,694
- Referee: Michael Batlan
- TV: Fox Sports Arizona

Game information

First quarter

- (9:41) ARIZ – Keola Antolin 1-yard run, John Bonano kick (Drive: 10 plays, 80 yards, 5:19; Arizona 7–0)
- (5:34) ARIZ – Ka'Deem Carey 11-yard pass from Nick Foles, John Bonano kick (Drive: 5 plays, 49 yards, 1:49; Arizona 14–0)
- (2:00) ASU – Cameron Marshall 2-yard run, Alex Garoutte kick (Drive: 12 plays, 74 yards, 3:29; Arizona 14–7)

Second quarter

- (10:14) ASU – Gerell Robinson 11-yard pass from Brock Osweiler, Alex Garoutte kick (Drive: 8 plays, 68 yards, 2:46; Tied 14–14)
- (4:29) ASU – Cameron Marshall 22-yard run, Alex Garoutte kick (Drive: 3 plays, 80 yards, 0:42; Arizona State 21–14)
- (0:02) ARIZ – John Bonano 43-yard field goal (Drive: 5 plays, 56 yards, 0:31; Arizona State 21–17)

Third quarter

- (9:24) ASU – Alex Garoutte 22-yard field goal (Drive: 5 plays, 18 yards, 1:30; Arizona State 24–17)

Fourth quarter

- (12:33) ASU – Alex Garoutte 27-yard field goal (Drive: 7 plays, 49 yards, 2:56; Arizona State 27–17)
- (10:25) ARIZ – Gino Crump 33-yard pass from Nick Foles, John Bonano kick (Drive: 7 plays, 94 yards, 2:00; Arizona State 27–24)
- (5:18) ARIZ – Juron Criner 23-yard pass from Bryson Beirne, John Bonano kick (Drive: 6 plays, 61 yards, 2:50; Arizona 31–27)

Statistics	ARIZ	ASU
First downs	26	28
Total yards	494	548
Rushing yards	28–101	23–61
Passing yards	393	487
Passing: Comp–Att–Int	36–52–0	36–65–2
Time of possession	32:05	27:55

Team	Category	Player	Statistics
Arizona	Passing	Nick Foles	35/51, 370 yards, 2 TD
Arizona	Rushing	Ka'Deem Carey	13 carries, 92 yards
Arizona	Receiving	Juron Criner	9 receptions, 134 yards, TD
Arizona State	Passing	Brock Osweiler	36/65, 487 yards, TD, 2 INT
Arizona State	Rushing	Cameron Marshall	16 carries, 22 yards, 2 TD
Arizona State	Receiving	Gerell Robinson	11 receptions, 199 yards, TD

=== vs Louisiana-Lafayette ===
Louisiana-Lafayette Ragin' Cajuns (7–4) vs Arizona Wildcats (3–8) – Game summary

Quarter	1	2	3	4	Total
Ragin' Cajuns	7	6	3	21	37
Wildcats	0	21	10	14	45

at Arizona Stadium • Tucson, AZ

- Date: November 26, 2011
- Game time: 2:00 p.m.
- Game weather: Clear, 68 °F (20 °C)
- Game attendance: 38,819
- Referee: Land Clark

Game information

First quarter

- (9:18) ULL – Harry Peoples 11-yard run, Brett Baer kick (Drive: 3 plays, 60 yards, 0:58; Louisiana-Lafayette 7–0)

Second quarter

- (14:57) ARIZ – Taimi Tutogi 1-yard run, John Bonano kick (Drive: 16 plays, 80 yards, 6:54; Tied 7–7)
- (9:14) ULL – Alonzo Harris 4-yard pass from Blaine Gautier, kick failed (Drive: 14 plays, 69 yards, 5:36; Louisiana-Lafayette 13–7)
- (3:13) ARIZ – Juron Criner 9-yard pass from Nick Foles, John Bonano kick (Drive: 5 plays, 73 yards, 1:38; Arizona 14–13)
- (0:34) ARIZ – David Douglas 12-yard pass from Nick Foles, John Bonano kick (Drive: 5 plays, 32 yards, 2:04; Arizona 21–13)

Third quarter

- (7:46) ARIZ – Daniel Jenkins 7-yard run, John Bonano kick (Drive: 9 plays, 73 yards, 3:52; Arizona 28–13)
- (5:21) ULL – Brett Baer 20-yard field goal (Drive: 8 plays, 61 yards, 2:18; Arizona 28–16)
- (3:22) ARIZ – John Bonano 39-yard field goal (Drive: 5 plays, 51 yards, 1:49; Arizona 31–16)

Fourth quarter

- (13:47) ULL – Jemarlou Moten 41-yard interception return, Brett Baer kick (Arizona 31–23)
- (13:28) ARIZ – Keola Antolin 7-yard run, John Bonano kick (Drive: 1 play, 2 yards, 0:05; Arizona 38–23)
- (10:26) ULL – Alonzo Harris 5-yard run, Brett Baer kick (Drive: 10 plays, 71 yards, 2:50; Arizona 38–30)
- (6:08) ARIZ – Juron Criner 35-yard pass from Nick Foles, John Bonano kick (Drive: 8 plays, 72 yards, 4:12; Arizona 45–30)
- (5:05) ULL – Blaine Gautier 10-yard run, Brett Baer kick (Drive: 4 plays, 77 yards, 0:57; Arizona 45–37)

Statistics	ULL	ARIZ
First downs	20	25
Total yards	408	494
Rushing yards	25–80	32–121
Passing yards	328	373
Passing: Comp–Att–Int	25–37–0	37–48–2
Time of possession	23:53	34:38

Team	Category	Player	Statistics
Louisiana-Lafayette	Passing	Blaine Gautier	24/36, 315 yards, TD
Louisiana-Lafayette	Rushing	Alonzo Harris	13 carries, 45 yards, TD
Louisiana-Lafayette	Receiving	Javone Lawson	5 receptions, 137 yards
Arizona	Passing	Nick Foles	33/43, 352 yards, 3 TD, INT
Arizona	Rushing	Keola Antolin	19 carries, 69 yards, TD
Arizona	Receiving	Juron Criner	9 receptions, 129 yards, 2 TD

== Rankings ==
Ranking movements Legend: ██ Increase in ranking ██ Decrease in ranking — = Not ranked RV = Received votes
	Week															
Poll	Pre	1	2	3	4	5	6	7	8	9	10	11	12	13	14	Final
AP	RV	RV	—	—	—	—	—	—	—	—	—	—	—	—	—	—
Coaches	RV	RV	—	—	—	—	—	—	—	—	—	—	—	—	—	—
Harris	Not released						—	—	—	—	—	—	—	—	—	Not released
BCS	Not released							—	—	—	—	—	—	—	—	Not released
