= The King's Academy (California) =

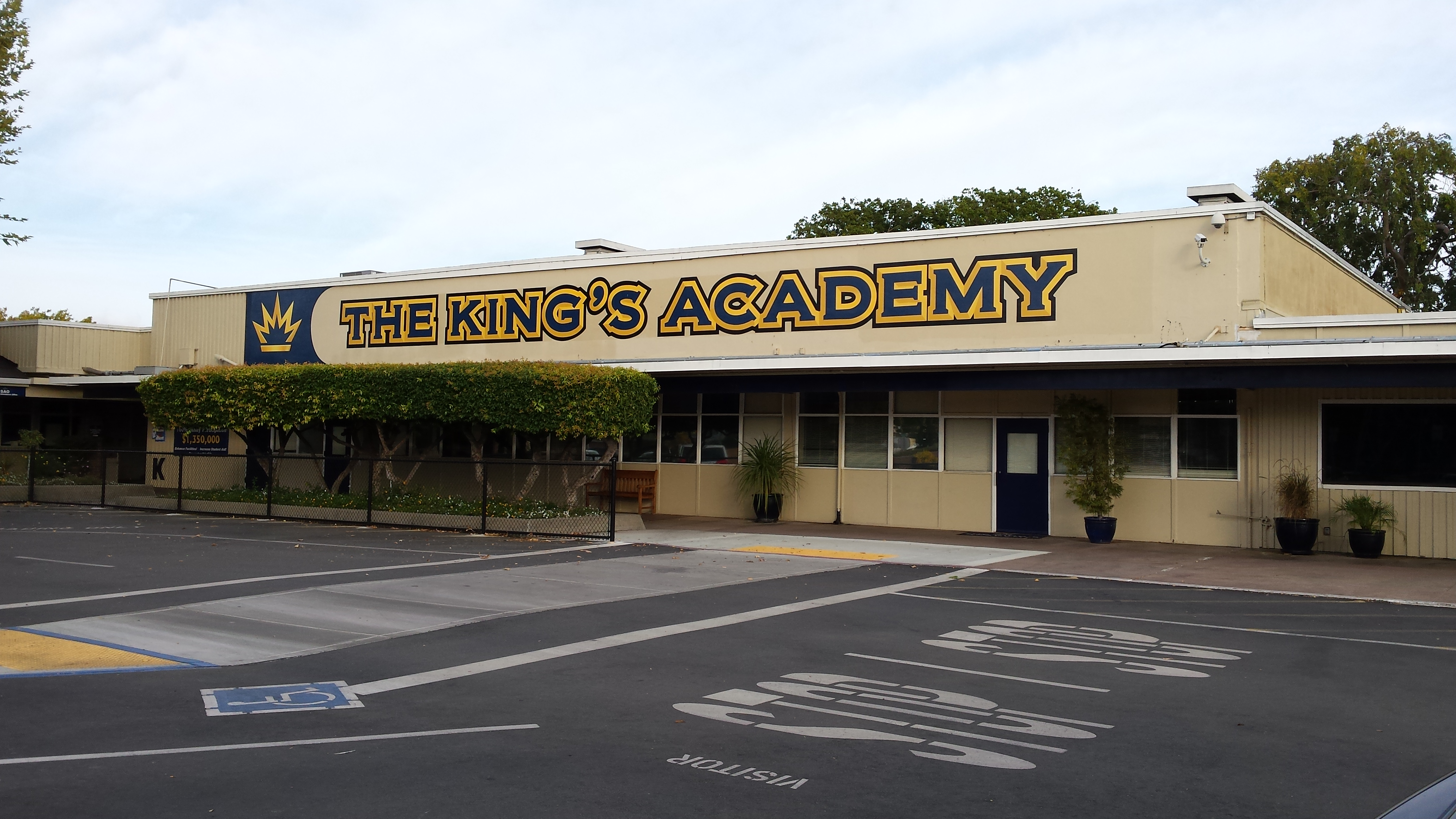

Location
- 562 N. Britton Avenue, Sunnyvale, California 94085; 37.386534°N 122.011959°W

Information
- Religious affiliation: Christian
- Opened: 1991
- Founders: Jack and Allegra McBirney
- Head of school: Jeff Freeman
- Grades: K-12
- Enrollment: 1250 (2025–2026 school year)
- Student to teacher ratio: 15:1
- Team name: Knights
- Accreditation: Association of Christian Schools International; Western Association of Schools and Colleges
- Website: www.tka.org

The King's Academy is a private, Christian elementary, junior high, and senior high school in Sunnyvale, California, United States. It is a member of the Association of Christian Schools International and the Western Association of Schools and Colleges. It was founded in 1991 and is housed on the former campus of Sunnyvale High School.

== Student body ==
Total enrollment is just over 1,250 students, about 600 high school students, 450 junior high students, and 200 elementary school students. In the 2025–2026 school year, about 59% of students were Asian, 16% White, 11% Multi-Racial, 5% Hispanic/Latino, 3% Black and 6% Other.

== Courses ==
The school offers 20 Advanced Placement courses.

The King's Academy has 9 departments.

1. Bible
2. Computer Science & Engineering
3. English
4. Mathematics
5. Physical Education
6. Science
7. Social Studies
8. Visual and Performing Arts (which includes)
  1. Art
  2. Dance
  3. Music
  4. Theater
9. World Languages

== Music ==
The King's Academy offers the following music courses:

- Choir / Concert Choir
- Percussion Ensemble
- Wind Ensemble
- Strings / String Ensemble / String Orchestra
- Jazz

== Language courses ==
The King's Academy offers the following language courses: (An H Indicates it as an honors class)

- French (1, 2, 3, 4, AP)
- Mandarin (1, 2, 3, 4, AP Chinese Language)
- Spanish (1, 2, 2H, 3, 3H, 4, AP)
- American Sign Language (Year 1, Year 2)

== Sports ==
As of 2018, the school has programs in baseball, basketball, cross country, dance, diving, drill team, flag football, football, golf, soccer, softball, squash, swimming, tennis, track and field, ultimate frisbee, volleyball, water polo, and weightlifting. In the mid-2010s, the head football coach was Michael Johnson, former assistant coach of the San Francisco 49ers. In 2017, former professional Canadian football player, Pete Lavorato took over as head football coach. Relief pitcher, Joe Biagini played at the school in the mid-2000s.

== Notable alumni ==
- Joe Biagini, former MLB pitcher
- Bralyn Lux, NFL cornerback for the Cincinnati Bengals
