= 2011 Illinois Fighting Illini football team =

American college football season

2011 Illinois Fighting Illini football

Kraft Fight Hunger Bowl champion

Kraft Fight Hunger Bowl, W 20–14 vs. UCLA
- Conference: Big Ten Conference
- Leaders Division
- Record: 7–6 (2–6 Big Ten)
- Head coach: Ron Zook (7th season; regular season); Vic Koenning (interim; bowl game)
- Offensive coordinator: Paul Petrino (2nd season)
- Offensive scheme: Multiple
- Defensive coordinator: Vic Koenning (2nd season)
- Base defense: 4–3
- Home stadium: Memorial Stadium

2011 Big Ten Conference football standings
	Conf.			Overall
Team	W		L	W		L
Legends Division
No. 11 Michigan State x	7	–	1	11	–	3
No. 12 Michigan %	6	–	2	11	–	2
No. 24 Nebraska	5	–	3	9	–	4
Iowa	4	–	4	7	–	6
Northwestern	3	–	5	6	–	7
Minnesota	2	–	6	3	–	9
Leaders Division
No. 10 Wisconsin xy$	6	–	2	11	–	3
Penn State x	6	–	2	9	–	4
Purdue	4	–	4	7	–	6
Ohio State	3	–	5	6	–	7
Illinois	2	–	6	7	–	6
Indiana	0	–	8	1	–	11
Championship: Wisconsin 42, Michigan State 39
$ – BCS representative as conference champion; % – BCS at-large representative; x – Division champion/co-champions; y – Championship game participant; Rankings from AP Poll

The 2011 Illinois Fighting Illini football team was an American football team that represented the University of Illinois Urbana-Champaign as a member of the Big Ten Conference during the 2011 NCAA Division I FBS football season. In their seventh and final season under head coach Ron Zook, the Fighting Illini compiled a 7–6 record (2–6 in conference games), finished in fifth place out of six teams in the Big Ten's Leaders Division, and outscored opponents by a total of 294 to 255. After opening the season with six victories, the Illini lost the last six games of the regular season. They concluded the season in the Kraft Fight Hunger Bowl where they defeated UCLA, 20–14. At the end of the regular season, Zook was fired, as were most of the assistant coaches. Defensive coordinator Vic Koenning stayed on as interim head coach for the bowl game.

Quarterback Nathan Scheelhaase led the team in both passing (2,110 yards) and rushing (624 yards). The team's other statistical leaders included wide receiver A. J. Jenkins (90 receptions for 1,276 yards) and kicker Derek Dimke (64 points scored, 34 of 34 extra points, 10 of 12 field goals).

The team played its home games at Memorial Stadium in Champaign, Illinois.

== Schedule ==
Date	Time	Opponent	Rank	Site	TV	Result	Attendance
September 3	2:30 pm	Arkansas State*		Memorial Stadium; Champaign, IL	BTN	W 33–15	45,154
September 10	11:00 am	South Dakota State*		Memorial Stadium; Champaign, IL	BTN	W 56–3	42,212
September 17	6:00 pm	No. 22 Arizona State*		Memorial Stadium; Champaign, IL	BTN	W 17–14	50,843
September 24	2:30 pm	Western Michigan*	No. 24	Memorial Stadium; Champaign, IL	BTN	W 23–20	43,684
October 1	11:00 am	Northwestern^{†}	No. 22	Memorial Stadium; Champaign, IL (Land of Lincoln Trophy)	ESPN2	W 38–35	53,243
October 8	1:30 pm	at Indiana	No. 19	Memorial Stadium; Bloomington, IN (rivalry)	BTN	W 41–20	41,665
October 15	2:30 pm	Ohio State	No. 16	Memorial Stadium; Champaign, IL (Illibuck)	ABC/ESPN	L 7–17	55,229
October 22	11:00 am	at Purdue	No. 23	Ross–Ade Stadium; West Lafayette, IN (Purdue Cannon)	ESPN2	L 14–21	45,146
October 29	2:30 pm	at No. 19 Penn State		Beaver Stadium; University Park, PA	ABC/ESPN2	L 7–10	97,828
November 12	2:30 pm	No. 22 Michigan		Memorial Stadium; Champaign, IL (rivalry)	ABC/ESPN	L 14–31	60,670
November 19	11:00 am	No. 15 Wisconsin		Memorial Stadium; Champaign, IL	ESPN2	L 17–28	54,633
November 26	2:30 pm	at Minnesota		TCF Bank Stadium; Minneapolis, MN	BTN	L 7–27	41,549
December 31	12:30 pm	vs. UCLA*		AT&T Park; San Francisco, CA (Kraft Fight Hunger Bowl)	ESPN	W 20–14	29,878
*Non-conference game; ^{†}Homecoming; Rankings from AP Poll released prior to the game; All times are in Central time

== Game summaries ==
=== Arkansas State ===
Arkansas State at Illinois

Team	1	2	3	4	Total
Arkansas State	0	8	0	7	15
• Illinois	7	10	13	3	33

- Date: September 3
- Location: Memorial Stadium
  Champaign, IL
- Game start: 2:37 p.m. CST
- Elapsed time: 3:10
- Game attendance: 45,154
- Game weather: 96°, Sunny
- Referee: Mike Cannon
- TV announcers (BTN): Tom Hart, Chris Martin & Rebecca Haarlow

Illinois opened the year at home for the first time since 2006. The opener was the first of eight home games for the Illini. After a slow start and falling behind 8–7 with 2:50 left in the 2nd quarter, the Illini scored a touchdown and a late field goal to take a 17 8 halftime lead. The offense continued to roll in the 2nd half as Illinois extended the lead to win the contest 33 15.

Illinois quarterback Nathan Scheelhaase led the Illini offense, finishing 16 for 23 on pass attempts totaling in 267 yards and two touchdowns. A.J. Jenkins was a favorite target for Scheelhaase, grabbing 11 receptions for 148 yards and 1 TD. Darius Millines also hauled in a TD and finished with 119 yards on 5 receptions. Jason Ford led the rushing attack with 86 yards on 22 carries and 2 touchdowns.

=== South Dakota State ===
South Dakota State at Illinois

Team	1	2	3	4	Total
South Dakota State	0	3	0	0	3
• Illinois	21	14	14	7	56

- Date: September 10
- Location: Memorial Stadium
  Champaign, IL
- TV announcers (BTN): Kevin Kugler, Kelly Stouffer & Tony Banks

=== Arizona State ===
Arizona State at Illinois

Team	1	2	3	4	Total
#22 Arizona State	7	0	0	7	14
• Illinois	10	0	0	7	17

- Date: September 17
- Location: Memorial Stadium
  Champaign, IL
- TV announcers (BTN): Eric Collins, Chris Martin & Dionne Miller

=== Western Michigan ===
Western Michigan at Illinois

Team	1	2	3	4	Total
Western Michigan	3	10	0	7	20
• #24 Illinois	7	3	10	3	23

- Date: September 24
- Location: Memorial Stadium
  Champaign, IL
- TV announcers (BTN): Wayne Larrivee, Jon Jansen & Lisa Byington

=== Northwestern ===
Northwestern at Illinois

Team	1	2	3	4	Total
Northwestern	0	14	14	7	35
• #24 Illinois	7	3	7	21	38

- Date: October 1
- Location: Memorial Stadium
  Champaign, IL
- TV announcers (ESPN2): Beth Mowins & Mike Bellotti

Scoring summary
1	2:28	ILL	A.J. Jenkins 14-yard pass from Nathan Scheelhaase (Derek Dimke kick)	ILL 7-0
2	12:31	NW	Drake Dinsmore 6-yard pass from Dan Persa (Jeff Budzien kick)	Tied 7-7
2	2:08	NW	Jeremy Ebert 3-yard pass from Dan Persa (Jeff Budzien kick)	NW 14-7
2	0:00	ILL	Derek Dimke 49-yard field goal	NW 14-10
3	11:42	NW	Jeremy Ebert 39-yard pass from Dan Persa (Jeff Budzien kick)	NW 21-10
3	7:11	NW	Jeremy Ebert 4-yard pass from Dan Persa (Jeff Budzien kick)	NW 28-10
3	3:51	ILL	A.J. Jenkins 33-yard pass from Nathan Scheelhaase (Derek Dimke kick)	NW 28-17
4	14:53	ILL	A.J. Jenkins 50-yard pass from Nathan Scheelhaase (run failed)	NW 28-23
4	6:53	ILL	Donovonn Young 1-yard run (Nathan Scheelhaase to Spencer Harris pass)	ILL 31-28
4	1:15	NW	Jacob Schmidt 6-yard run (Jeff Budzien kick)	NW 35-31
4	0:13	ILL	Nathan Scheelhaase 1-yard run (Derek Dimke kick)	ILL 38-35

=== Indiana ===
Illinois at Indiana

Team	1	2	3	4	Total
• #19 Illinois	14	13	7	7	41
Indiana	10	3	0	7	20

- Date: October 8
- Location: Memorial Stadium
  Bloomington, IN
- TV announcers (BTN): Eric Collins & Chris Martin

=== Ohio State ===
Ohio State at Illinois

Team	1	2	3	4	Total
• Ohio State	3	0	7	7	17
#16 Illinois	0	0	0	7	7

- Date: October 15
- Location: Memorial Stadium
  Champaign, IL
- TV announcers (ABC/ESPN): Bob Wischusen, Bob Davie & Heather Cox

=== Purdue ===
Illinois at Purdue

Team	1	2	3	4	Total
#23 Illinois	0	0	0	14	14
• Purdue	7	14	0	0	21

- Date: October 22
- Location: Ross–Ade Stadium
  West Lafayette, IN
- TV announcers (ESPN2): Beth Mowins & Mike Bellotti

=== Penn State ===
Illinois at Penn State

Team	1	2	3	4	Total
Illinois	0	0	7	0	7
• #19 Penn State	0	0	0	10	10

- Date: October 29
- Location: Beaver Stadium
  University Park, PA
- TV announcers (ABC/ESPN2): Carter Blackburn & Brock Huard

=== Michigan ===
Michigan at Illinois

Team	1	2	3	4	Total
• #22 Michigan	7	7	3	14	31
Illinois	0	0	7	7	14

- Date: November 12
- Location: Memorial Stadium
  Champaign, IL
- TV announcers (ABC/ESPN): Justin Kutcher & Craig James

=== Wisconsin ===
Wisconsin at Illinois

Team	1	2	3	4	Total
• Wisconsin	0	7	14	7	28
Illinois	0	17	0	0	17

- Date: November 19
- Location: Memorial Stadium
  Champaign, IL
- TV announcers (ESPN2): Beth Mowins & Mike Bellotti

=== Minnesota ===
Illinois at Minnesota

Team	1	2	3	4	Total
Illinois	0	0	7	0	7
• Minnesota	0	20	7	0	27

- Date: November 26
- Location: Memorial Stadium
  Champaign, IL
- TV announcers (BTN): Tom Hart, Derek Rackley & Lisa Byington

=== UCLA (Kraft Fight Hunger Bowl) ===
Illinois at Bruins

Team	1	2	3	4	Total
• Illinois	0	3	7	10	20
Bruins	0	7	0	7	14

- Date: December 31
- Location: AT&T Park
  San Francisco, California
- TV announcers (ESPN): Carter Blackburn & Brock Huard

The Bruins, with a losing record, were granted a waiver to play in a bowl game by the NCAA on November 30, 2011 since their seventh loss was played in the post-season Pac-12 Championship Game. The Bruins were coached by interim head coach Mike Johnson, who replaced Rick Neuheisel.

Second Quarter scoring: UCLA – Taylor Embree 16-yard pass from Kevin Prince (Tyler Gonzalez kick); ILL – Derek Dimke 36-yard field goal

Third Quarter scoring: ILL – T. Hawthorne 39-yard interception return (Dimke kick)

Fourth Quarter scoring: ILL – Dimke 37-yard field goal; ILL – A. J. Jenkins 60-yard pass from N. Scheelhaase (Dimke kick); UCLA – Nelson Rosario 38-yard pass from Prince (Gonzalez kick)

== Rankings ==
Ranking movements Legend: ██ Increase in ranking ██ Decrease in ranking — = Not ranked RV = Received votes
	Week															
Poll	Pre	1	2	3	4	5	6	7	8	9	10	11	12	13	14	Final
AP	—	—	—	24	24	19	16	23	RV	—	—	—	—	—	—	—
Coaches	—	—	—	RV	22	16	15	21	RV	—	—	—	—	—	—	—
Harris	Not released						14	20	RV	—	—	—	—	—	—	Not released
BCS	Not released							23	—	—	—	—	—	—	—	Not released
