= Kip Smith =

American football player (born 1992)

Profile
- Position: Punter

Personal information
- Born: June 4, 1992 (age 34); Albuquerque, New Mexico
- Listed height: 6 ft 0 in (1.83 m)
- Listed weight: 230 lb (104 kg)

Career information
- High school: Legacy (CO)
- College: Oklahoma State
- NFL draft: 2015: undrafted

Career history
- Philadelphia Eagles (2015)*; Brooklyn Bolts (2015)
- * Offseason or practice squad member only

Awards and highlights
- 2015 Cactus Bowl champion

Howard Clifton "Kip" Smith IV (born June 4, 1992) is an American former football punter. He played college football for UCLA and Oklahoma State University. He was picked up as an undrafted free agent by the Philadelphia Eagles after the 2015 NFL draft.

Smith was cut by the team on September 4, 2015. Smith holds the longest field goal in Colorado High School history of 67 yards.
