= 2011 Oregon State Beavers football team =

American college football season

2011 Oregon State Beavers football
- Conference: Pac-12 Conference
- North Division
- Record: 3–9 (3–6 Pac-12)
- Head coach: Mike Riley (11th season)
- Offensive coordinator: Danny Langsdorf (7th season)
- Offensive scheme: Multiple
- Defensive coordinator: Mark Banker (9th season)
- Base defense: 4–3
- Home stadium: Reser Stadium

2011 Pac-12 Conference football standings
| | Conf. | | | Overall |
| Team | W | | L | W | | L |
|---|---|---|---|---|---|---|
North Division
| No. 4 Oregon xy$ | 8 | – | 1 | 12 | – | 2 |
| No. 7 Stanford x% | 8 | – | 1 | 11 | – | 2 |
| Washington | 5 | – | 4 | 7 | – | 6 |
| California | 4 | – | 5 | 7 | – | 6 |
| Oregon State | 3 | – | 6 | 3 | – | 9 |
| Washington State | 2 | – | 7 | 4 | – | 8 |
South Division
| No. 6 USC † | 7 | – | 2 | 10 | – | 2 |
| UCLA xy | 5 | – | 4 | 6 | – | 8 |
| Utah | 4 | – | 5 | 8 | – | 5 |
| Arizona State | 4 | – | 5 | 6 | – | 7 |
| Arizona | 2 | – | 7 | 4 | – | 8 |
| Colorado | 2 | – | 7 | 3 | – | 10 |
Championship: Oregon 49, UCLA 31
$ – BCS representative as conference champion; % – BCS at-large representative; x – Division champion/co-champions; y – Championship game participant; † – USC ineligible for championship and postseason due to NCAA sanctions; Rankings from AP Poll

The 2011 Oregon State Beavers football team represented Oregon State University during the 2011 NCAA Division I FBS football season. The team's head coach was Mike Riley, in his ninth straight season and eleventh overall. Home games were played at Reser Stadium in Corvallis, and they are members of the North Division of the Pac-12 Conference. The Beavers finished the season 3–9 overall and 3–6 in Pac-12 play to finish in fifth place in the North Division. The team finished with their worst record since 1996.

== Schedule ==
| Date | Time | Opponent | Site | TV | Result | Attendance |
|---|---|---|---|---|---|---|
| September 3 | 1:00 pm | Sacramento State* | Reser Stadium; Corvallis, Oregon | | L 28–29 ^{OT} | 41,581 |
| September 10 | 9:00 am | at No. 8 Wisconsin* | Camp Randall Stadium; Madison, Wisconsin | ESPN | L 0–35 | 80,337 |
| September 24 | 12:30 pm | UCLA | Reser Stadium; Corvallis, Oregon | FCS Pacific | L 19–27 | 44,352 |
| October 1 | 7:30 pm | at No. 25 Arizona State | Sun Devil Stadium; Tempe, Arizona | FCS Pacific | L 20–35 | 57,437 |
| October 8 | 12:30 pm | Arizona | Reser Stadium; Corvallis, Oregon | FCS Pacific | W 37–27 | 40,403 |
| October 15 | 1:00 pm | BYU* | Reser Stadium; Corvallis, Oregon | FCS Pacific | L 28–38 | 42,584 |
| October 22 | 7:30 pm | vs. Washington State | CenturyLink Field; Seattle | FSN | W 44–21 | 49,219 |
| October 29 | 4:00 pm | at Utah | Rice-Eccles Stadium; Salt Lake City | RTNW | L 8–27 | 45,017 |
| November 5 | 12:30 pm | No. 4 Stanford^{†} | Reser Stadium; Corvallis, Oregon | ABC | L 13–38 | 42,835 |
| November 12 | 3:30 pm | at California | AT&T Park; San Francisco | RTNW | L 6–23 | 39,602 |
| November 19 | 12:30 pm | Washington | Reser Stadium; Corvallis, Oregon | RTNW | W 38–21 | 42,766 |
| November 26 | 12:30 pm | at No. 9 Oregon | Autzen Stadium; Eugene, Oregon (Civil War) | ABC/ESPN2 | L 21–49 | 59,802 |
*Non-conference game; ^{†}Homecoming; Rankings from AP Poll released prior to the game; All times are in Pacific time

== Roster ==
2011 Oregon State Beavers
| Quarterbacks: 4 Sean Mannion; 12 Ryan Katz; 14 Cody Vaz; 17 Jack Lomax; Running backs: 19 Jovan Stevenson; 24 Ryan McCants; 28 Terron Ward; 34 Jordan Jenkins; 35 Malcolm Agnew; Fullbacks: 32 Westly Meng; 33 Tyler Anderson; 36 Dylan Parsons; 42 Clayton York; Wide receivers: 1 James Rodgers; 2 Markus Wheaton; 13 Brandin Cooks; 15 Darrell Catchings; 18 Geno Munoz; 21 Mitch Singler; 23 Jordan Bishop; 37 Jeff Bedbury; 40 Garrett Hall; 80 Danny Evans; 81 Micah Hatfield; 84 Kevin Cummings; 85 Brett Ackerman; 86 Obum Gwatcham | Tight ends: 82 Colby Prince; 87 Joe Halahuni; 88 Tyler Perry; 89 Connor Hamlett; Offensive guards: 53 Colin Lyons; 61 Michael Lamb; 74 Burke Ellis; Offensive tackles: 50 Mike Remmers; 72 Darryl Jackson; 77 Michael Philip; Offensive linemen: 51 Michael Beaton; 62 Geoff Garner; 64 Colin Kelly; 65 Roman Sapolu; 69 Joshua Andrews; 70 Grant Johnson; 71 Grant Enger; 73 David Vieru; 75 Derek Nielsen; 79 Aaron Magnuson | Defensive tackles: 66 Ben Motter; 74 Kevin Frahm; 79 Joe Lopez; 92 Fred Thompson; 96 Dominic Glover; 97 Mana Tuivailala; 98 Castro Masaniai; Defensive ends: 49 Andrew Seumalo; 56 Rusty Fernando; 76 John Braun; 91 Taylor Henry; 93 Mana Rosa; 94 Devon Krell; 95 Scott Crichton; 99 Blake Harra; Linebackers: 5 Cameron Collins; 13 Reuben Robinson; 36 Josh Parish; 39 Donnell Welch; 40 Michael Doctor; 41 Feti Unga; 43 Tony Wilson; 45 Michael Bibbee; 46 Shiloah Te'o; 47 Josh Williams; 51 Charlie Gilmur; 55 Shaydon Akuna | Cornerbacks: 6 Sean Martin; 14 Jordan Poyer; 16 Rashaad Reynolds; 17 Brandon Hardin; 20 Keynan Parker; 21 Ryan Handford; 38 Brian Watkins; Safeties: 3 Anthony Watkins; 10 Lance Mitchell; 12 Dax Dilbeck; 15 Levi Levasa; 25 Ryan Murphy; 26 Josh LaGrone; 29 Will Storey; 30 Zeke Sanders; Long snappers: 52 Troy Whalen; 57 Marcus Perry; 58 Michael Morovick; Place kickers: 18 Max Johnson; 27 Trevor Romaine; Punters: 7 Johnny Hekker; 48 Keith Kostol |

== Game summaries ==
=== Sacramento State ===
| | 1 | 2 | 3 | 4 | OT | Total |
|---|---|---|---|---|---|---|
| Hornets | 0 | 14 | 7 | 0 | 8 | 29 |
| Beavers | 0 | 3 | 3 | 15 | 7 | 28 |

The Sacramento State Hornets defeated Oregon State in overtime on September 3, 29–28. The Hornets had second possession in overtime, and after quarterback Jeff Fleming made a 6-yard touchdown pass to wide receiver Brandyn Reed to pull within one point, the Hornets attempted a two-point conversion for the win. Fleming and Reed connected again for the two-point conversion and the 1-point victory. During Oregon State's possession in overtime, running back Malcolm Agnew put the Beavers ahead by 7 with a 17-yard touchdown run. For the game, Agnew ran for 223 yards and three touchdowns on 33 carries to lead the Beavers. After the Beavers trailed 14–3 at halftime, quarterback Ryan Katz was replaced by redshirt freshman Sean Mannion. Mannion finished the day with eight completion on 12 attempts and 143 yards, while Katz managed 11 completions on 22 attempts and 87 yards. James Rodgers did not play for the Beavers due to a lingering knee injury.

=== Wisconsin ===
| | 1 | 2 | 3 | 4 | Total |
|---|---|---|---|---|---|
| Beavers | 0 | 0 | 0 | 0 | 0 |
| #8 Badgers | 7 | 14 | 7 | 7 | 35 |

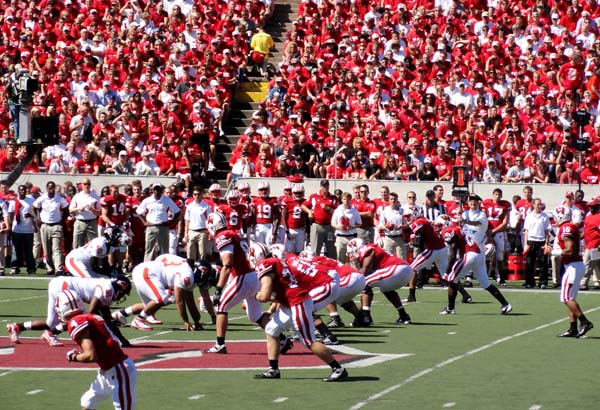
State on defense in the first half.

=== UCLA ===
| | 1 | 2 | 3 | 4 | Total |
|---|---|---|---|---|---|
| Bruins | 7 | 14 | 0 | 6 | 27 |
| Beavers | 3 | 7 | 9 | 0 | 19 |

UCLA leads the series 40–15–4 that began in 1930 and played in Los Angeles, Corvallis, Portland and Tokyo (1980 Mirage Bowl). The Bruins won last year 17–14 on Kai Forbath's 51-yard field goal on the last play of the game.

Wide receiver James Rodgers made his return to the lineup for the Beavers after being out almost a year with a knee injury suffered against Arizona the previous season.

Scoring summary

| Quarter | Time | Drive | | | Team | Scoring information | Score | |
| Quarter | Time | Plays | Yards | TOP | Team | Scoring information | UCLA | Oregon State |
|---|---|---|---|---|---|---|---|---|
| 1 | 2:58 | 17 | 82 | 7:46 | Oregon State | 25-yard field goal by Trevor Romaine | 0 | 3 |
| 1 | 1:36 | 3 | 80 | 1:16 | UCLA | Taylor Embree 22-yard touchdown reception from Richard Brehaut, Jeff Locke kick good | 7 | 3 |
| 2 | 10:30 | 7 | 46 | 3:12 | UCLA | Richard Brehaut 5-yard touchdown run, Jeff Locke kick good | 14 | 3 |
| 2 | 4:05 | 1 | 4 | 0:05 | UCLA | Jordan James 4-yard touchdown run, Jeff Locke kick good | 21 | 3 |
| 2 | 0:13 | | | | Oregon State | Punt returned 85 yards for touchdown by Jordan Poyer, Trevor Romaine kick good | 21 | 10 |
| 3 | 11:49 | 9 | 67 | 3:11 | Oregon State | 30-yard field goal by Trevor Romaine | 21 | 13 |
| 3 | 0:00 | 6 | 73 | 2:08 | Oregon State | Jordan Bishop 45-yard touchdown reception from Sean Mannion, 2-point pass failed | 21 | 19 |
| 4 | 6:15 | 9 | 65 | 4:15 | UCLA | Anthony Barr 1-yard touchdown run, Jeff Locke kick no good (blocked) | 27 | 19 |
| "TOP" = time of possession. For other American football terms, see Glossary of American football. | | | | | | | 27 | 19 |

=== Arizona State ===
| | 1 | 2 | 3 | 4 | Total |
|---|---|---|---|---|---|
| Beavers | 6 | 7 | 7 | 0 | 20 |
| #25 Sun Devils | 0 | 21 | 7 | 7 | 35 |

=== Arizona ===
| | 1 | 2 | 3 | 4 | Total |
|---|---|---|---|---|---|
| Wildcats | 0 | 6 | 14 | 7 | 27 |
| Beavers | 0 | 27 | 3 | 7 | 37 |

=== BYU ===
| | 1 | 2 | 3 | 4 | Total |
|---|---|---|---|---|---|
| Cougars | 7 | 7 | 10 | 14 | 38 |
| Beavers | 0 | 14 | 7 | 7 | 28 |

Scoring summary

| Quarter | Time | Drive | | | Team | Scoring information | Score | |
| Quarter | Time | Plays | Yards | TOP | Team | Scoring information | BYU | Oregon State |
|---|---|---|---|---|---|---|---|---|
| 1 | 5:02 | 12 | 82 | 7:28 | BYU | Michael Alisa 10-yard touchdown run, Justin Sorensen kick good | 7 | 0 |
| 2 | 9:23 | 9 | 50 | 4:48 | BYU | JJ Di Luigi 3-yard touchdown run, Justin Sorensen kick good | 14 | 0 |
| 2 | 3:51 | 11 | 72 | 5:32 | Oregon State | Sean Mannion 1-yard touchdown run, Trevor Romaine kick good | 14 | 7 |
| 2 | 1:38 | | | | Oregon State | Interception returned 51 yards for touchdown by Jordan Poyer, Trevor Romaine kick good | 14 | 14 |
| 3 | 11:16 | 7 | 80 | 3:44 | BYU | Cody Hoffman 12-yard touchdown reception from Riley Nelson, Justin Sorensen kick good | 21 | 14 |
| 3 | 3:26 | 5 | 20 | 1:41 | BYU | 33-yard field goal by Justin Sorensen | 24 | 14 |
| 3 | 2:08 | 3 | 77 | 1:18 | Oregon State | Brandin Cooks 59-yard touchdown reception from Sean Mannion, Trevor Romaine kick good | 24 | 21 |
| 4 | 10:39 | 12 | 66 | 6:29 | BYU | JD Falslev 2-yard touchdown reception from Riley Nelson, Justin Sorensen kick good | 31 | 21 |
| 4 | 3:37 | 6 | 69 | 3:32 | BYU | Kaneakua Friel 8-yard touchdown reception from Riley Nelson, Justin Sorensen kick good | 38 | 21 |
| 4 | :23 | 15 | 73 | 3:14 | Oregon State | Jovan Stevenson 2-yard touchdown run, Trevor Romaine kick good | 38 | 28 |
| "TOP" = time of possession. For other American football terms, see Glossary of American football. | | | | | | | 38 | 28 |

=== Washington State ===
| | 1 | 2 | 3 | 4 | Total |
|---|---|---|---|---|---|
| Beavers | 7 | 17 | 7 | 13 | 44 |
| Cougars | 0 | 14 | 0 | 7 | 21 |

=== Utah ===
| | 1 | 2 | 3 | 4 | Total |
|---|---|---|---|---|---|
| Beavers | 0 | 0 | 0 | 8 | 8 |
| Utes | 3 | 21 | 0 | 3 | 27 |

=== Stanford ===
| | 1 | 2 | 3 | 4 | Total |
|---|---|---|---|---|---|
| #4 Cardinal | 0 | 17 | 14 | 7 | 38 |
| Beavers | 0 | 7 | 6 | 0 | 13 |

=== California ===
| | 1 | 2 | 3 | 4 | Total |
|---|---|---|---|---|---|
| Beavers | 3 | 3 | 0 | 0 | 6 |
| Golden Bears | 7 | 7 | 6 | 3 | 23 |

=== Washington ===
| | 1 | 2 | 3 | 4 | Total |
|---|---|---|---|---|---|
| Huskies | 7 | 7 | 0 | 7 | 21 |
| Beavers | 14 | 3 | 0 | 21 | 38 |

=== Oregon ===
| | 1 | 2 | 3 | 4 | Total |
|---|---|---|---|---|---|
| Beavers | 0 | 7 | 0 | 14 | 21 |
| #9 Ducks | 7 | 21 | 7 | 14 | 49 |

== Player death ==
Fred Thompson, a true freshman defensive end, died in the early evening of December 7, 2011 in Corvallis. According to OSU officials, Thompson was playing basketball at the Dixon Recreation Center on the OSU campus when he collapsed. He was transported to Good Samaritan Hospital in Corvallis where he was pronounced dead. Thompson was from Richmond, California. He was 19 years old.
