= Mike Johnson (American football coach) =

American football player and coach (born 1967)

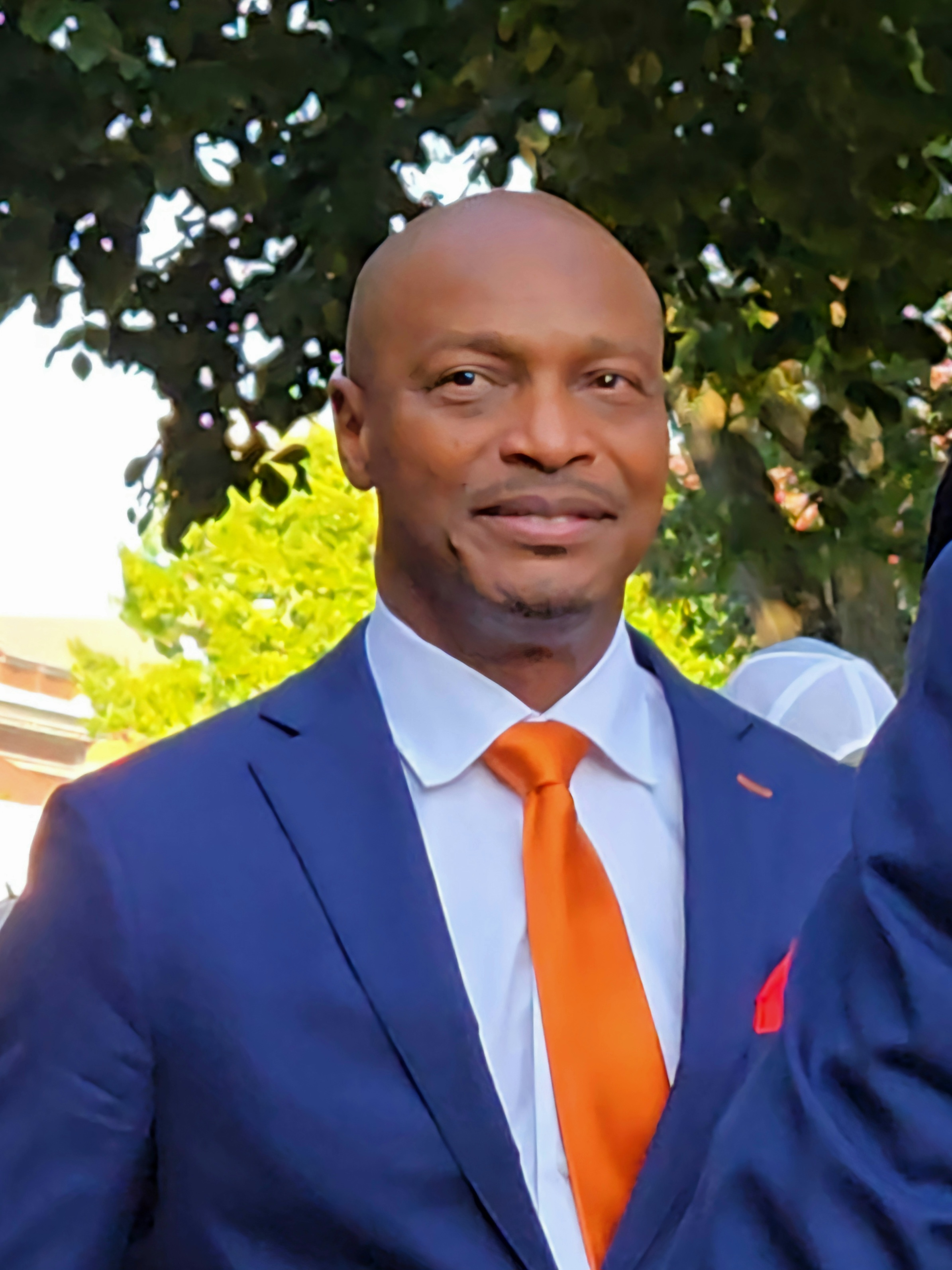
- Johnson with the Syracuse Orange in 2024

Current position
- Title: Co-offensive coordinator & tight ends coach
- Team: Syracuse
- Conference: ACC

Biographical details
- Born: May 2, 1969 (age 57); Los Angeles, California, U.S.

Playing career
- 1985–1986: Arizona State
- 1987: Mesa (AZ)
- 1988–1989: Akron
- 1991–1992: San Antonio Riders
- 1992–1993: British Columbia Lions
- 1994: Orlando Predators
- 1994–1995: Shreveport Pirates
- Position: Quarterback

Coaching career (HC unless noted)
- 1997–1998: Oregon State (WR)
- 1999: Oregon State (QB)
- 2000–2001: San Diego Chargers (QB)
- 2002: Atlanta Falcons (WR)
- 2003–2005: Atlanta Falcons (QB)
- 2006–2007: Baltimore Ravens (WR)
- 2009–2010: San Francisco 49ers (QB)
- 2010: San Francisco 49ers (OC)
- 2011: UCLA (OC)
- 2011: UCLA (interim HC)
- 2014–2016: King's Academy (CA)
- 2017–2018: Oregon (WR)
- 2019: Mississippi State (WR)
- 2021: Florida Atlantic (co-OC/QB)
- 2022–2023: Syracuse (WR)
- 2024–present: Syracuse (co-OC/TE)

Head coaching record
- Overall: 0–1 (college); 24–9 (high school)

Michael Eric Johnson (born May 2, 1967) is an American football coach and former quarterback, and current tight ends coach for Syracuse. He was the interim head coach for the UCLA Bruins football team after serving as their offensive coordinator. Previously, he spent two years with the San Francisco 49ers of the National Football League. Johnson was hired along with former offensive coordinator Jimmy Raye by San Francisco head coach Mike Singletary on February 6, 2009. Raye was fired on September 27, 2010, and Johnson was promoted. Beginning in 2014 he served for three seasons as head coach of The King's Academy Knights in Sunnyvale, California, before being hired as wide receiver coach by the University of Oregon in 2017.

== Playing career ==
=== College ===
Johnson was a backup quarterback at Arizona State University from 1985 to 1986. In 1987, Johnson was a Junior College All-American at Mesa Community College. In 1988 and 1989, Johnson played at the University of Akron. Johnson was named Akron's Athlete of the Year in 1990.

=== Professional ===
In 1991 and 1992, Johnson played quarterback for the San Antonio Riders of the World League. From 1994 to 1995, Johnson quarterbacked the Shreveport Pirates of the Canadian Football League.

== Coaching career ==
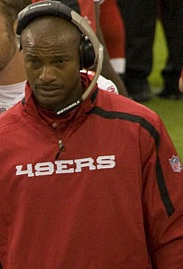
Johnson with the San Francisco 49ers in 2009.

At Oregon State University, Johnson and the wide receiver coach from 1997 to 1998 and the quarterback coach in 1999. Johnson was the San Diego Chargers quarterbacks coach for the 2000 and 2001 seasons. Johnson served as the quarterbacks coach for the Atlanta Falcons from 2003 to 2005 where he worked with Quarterback Michael Vick. In 2003, Mike Johnson was the offensive coordinator for the last two games of the season under interim head coach Wade Phillips.

Before joining the 49ers, Mike Johnson was the wide receivers coach for the Baltimore Ravens in 2006 and 2007. On September 27, 2010, Johnson was named offensive coordinator for the San Francisco 49ers, replacing Jimmy Raye.

After the end of the 2010 season, Johnson was not retained by the new head coach Jim Harbaugh. He was later hired as an assistant coach at UCLA in January 2011. He was named UCLA's interim head coach after the firing of Rick Neuheisel. He coached the final game of the season at the Kraft Fight Hunger Bowl.

Johnson was not retained by new UCLA coach Jim L. Mora in 2012.

On April 15, 2014, Johnson was announced as the new development director and Head Football Coach at The King's Academy in Sunnyvale, CA. After three seasons there, he was hired as wide receiver coach by the University of Oregon Ducks.

Johnson was hired as Syracuse's outside wide receivers coach on February 9, 2022.

== Head coaching record ==
=== College ===
Year	Team	Overall	Conference	Standing	Bowl/playoffs
UCLA Bruins (Pac-12 Conference) (2011)
2011	UCLA	0–1 (Note: Rick Neuheisel was fired after the Pac-12 Championship Game. Johnson was appointed as interim head coach and coached the team in the Kraft Fight Hunger Bowl.)	0–0	(South)	L Kraft Fight Hunger
UCLA:		0–1	0–0		
Total:		0–1			

=== High school ===
Year	Team	Overall	Conference	Standing	Bowl/playoffs
King's Academy Knights () (2014–2016)
2014	King's Academy	9–2	5–0	1st	
2015	King's Academy	8–3	3–2	3rd	
2016	King's Academy	7–4	2–3	4th	
King's Academy:		24–9	10–5		
Total:		24–9			
National championship Conference title Conference division title or championship game berth
