= Keola Antolin =

Canadian gridiron football player (born 1990)

No. 1
- Position: Running back

Personal information
- Born: January 14, 1990 (age 36); Honolulu, Hawaii, U.S.
- Listed height: 5 ft 7 in (1.70 m)
- Listed weight: 196 lb (89 kg)

Career information
- College: Arizona

Career history
- 2013: Tri-Cities Fever
- 2014–2015: BC Lions
- Stats at CFL.ca (archive)

Keola Antolin (born January 14, 1990) is an American former professional football running back who played for the BC Lions of the Canadian Football League (CFL). He played college football at Arizona.

== College career ==
Antolin played college football at the University of Arizona from 2008 to 2011. During his career he rushed for 2,398 yards on 500 carries with 26 touchdowns. He also had 77 receptions for 508 yards and three touchdowns.

== Professional career ==
Antolin signed with the BC Lions of the Canadian Football League in June 2014. He was released on September 8, 2015.
