= 2012 USC Trojans football team =

American college football season

2012 USC Trojans football

Sun Bowl, L 7–21 vs. Georgia Tech
- Conference: Pac-12 Conference
- South Division
- Record: 7–6 (5–4 Pac-12)
- Head coach: Lane Kiffin (3rd season)
- Offensive coordinator: Kennedy Polamalu (3rd season)
- Offensive scheme: West Coast
- Defensive coordinator: Ed Orgeron (3rd season)
- Base defense: 4–3
- Captains: Matt Barkley; Khaled Holmes; T. J. McDonald; Nickell Robey
- Home stadium: Los Angeles Memorial Coliseum

2012 Pac-12 Conference football standings
	Conf.			Overall
Team	W		L	W		L
North Division
No. 7 Stanford xy$	8	–	1	12	–	2
No. 2 Oregon x%	8	–	1	12	–	1
No. 20 Oregon State	6	–	3	9	–	4
Washington	5	–	4	7	–	6
California	2	–	7	3	–	9
Washington State	1	–	8	3	–	9
South Division
UCLA xy	6	–	3	9	–	5
Arizona State	5	–	4	8	–	5
USC	5	–	4	7	–	6
Arizona	4	–	5	8	–	5
Utah	3	–	6	5	–	7
Colorado	1	–	8	1	–	11
Championship: Stanford 27, UCLA 24
$ – BCS representative as conference champion; % – BCS at-large representative; x – Division champion/co-champions; y – Championship game participant; Rankings from AP Poll

The 2012 USC Trojans football team represented the University of Southern California in the 2012 NCAA Division I FBS college football season. The Trojans were led by third-year head coach Lane Kiffin, played their home games at Los Angeles Memorial Coliseum, and were members of the South Division of the Pac-12 Conference. USC returned 18 starters and 13 All-Conference performers from a team that finished the 2011 season ranked No. 6 in the AP Poll with a 10–2 record overall, and finished first in the South Division with a 7–2 record in Pac-12 play. However, as part of a two-year-post-season ban mandated by the NCAA, the Trojans could not claim the 2011 Pac-12 South Division title, participate in the conference championship game or play in a bowl game. The 2012 season was the first year under Kiffin that the Trojans were eligible for post-season play. They started the season ranked #1 in the AP Poll, but finished unranked—the first team to do so since the 1964 Ole Miss Rebels and the first to do so in the BCS-era. The Trojans finished the season 7–6, 5–4 in Pac-12 play, tied for second in the Pac-12 South Division. They were invited to the Sun Bowl where they were defeated 21–7 by Georgia Tech.

== Before the season ==
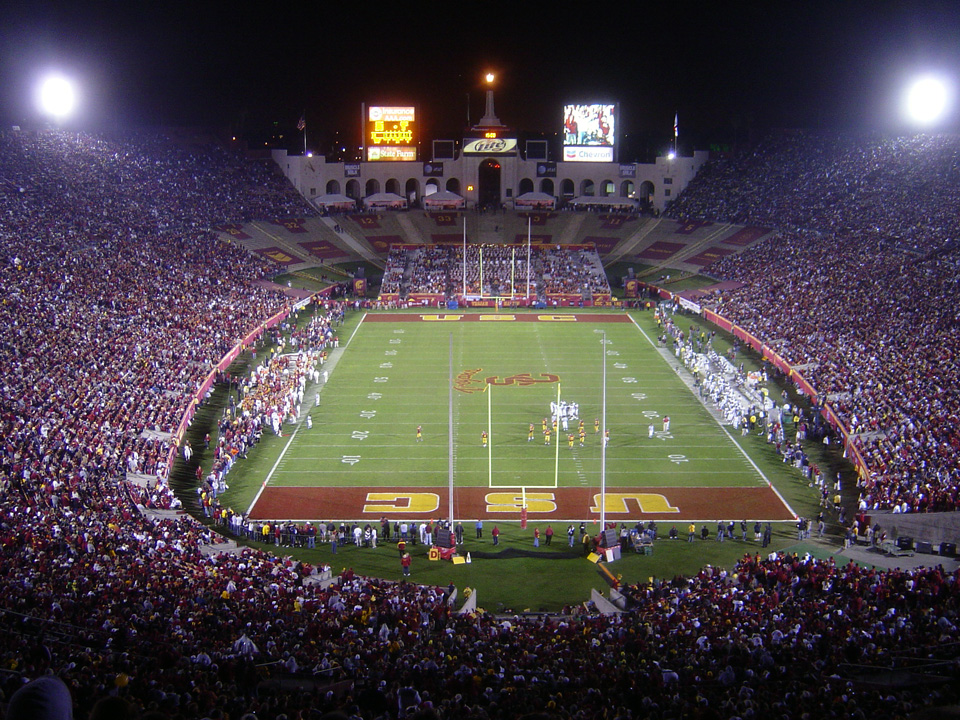
The USC Trojans play their home games at the Los Angeles Memorial Coliseum.

On December 22, 2011, All-American quarterback Matt Barkley announced that he would be returning to USC for his senior season to complete some "unfinished business" for the Trojans.

Along with Barkley, who was a leading Heisman candidate, the Trojan offense returns nine starters, including 2011 All-Conference center Khaled Holmes, a thousand-yard rusher from 2011 in senior running back Curtis McNeal, and two thousand-yard receivers in Robert Woods and Marqise Lee. In addition, former Penn State running back Silas Redd transferred to USC and will be immediately eligible to play during the 2012 season. The addition of Redd means the USC offense now boasts two thousand-yard rushers, two thousand-year receivers, and a 3,500-yard passer from the 2011 season.

On defense, the Trojans return seven starters and four All-Conference players, including first-team All-Conference performers in safety T. J. McDonald and cornerback Nickell Robey-Coleman, senior defensive end Wes Horton, and the team's co-leading tacklers in sophomore linebackers Hayes Pullard and Dion Bailey, who was named the Pac-12 Freshman Defensive Player of the Year in 2011.

USC returns 18 starters and thirteen All-Conference performers in 2012. The most significant loss on offense came with the early departure of left offensive tackle Matt Kalil, who was drafted No. 4 overall in the First Round of the NFL Draft by the Minnesota Vikings. Kalil is expected to be succeeded at left offensive tackle by true sophomore Aundrey Walker. USC also graduated fullback Rhett Ellison, who was also drafted by the Vikings at No. 128 overall in the Fourth Round. Redshirt freshman Soma Vainuku is the leading contender to start at the fullback position. The most significant loss on defense came with the early departure of defensive end Nick Perry, who was drafted No. 28 overall in the First Round by the Green Bay Packers. Perry is expected to be replaced at Right Defensive End by senior Wes Horton. The Trojans also graduated defensive tackles DaJohn Harris and Christian Tupou, who are expected to be replaced in the starting lineup by sophomore George Uko and redshirt freshman Antwaun Woods.

On July 30, starting Left Defensive End Devon Kennard underwent surgery for a torn pectoralis major muscle. Team doctors told him that it would take approximately four months to fully recover from the surgery, which would make him a redshirt candidate and allow him to return to USC for a fifth year in 2013. Sophomore J.R. Tavai was moved to defensive end from nose tackle in fall camp, and will compete with redshirt freshman Greg Townsend to start at Left Defensive End.

On July 31, former Penn State running back Silas Redd announced his intent to transfer to USC in the wake of the NCAA sanctions given to the Nittany Lions relating to the Penn State child sex abuse scandal. Redd will be immediately eligible to play at USC during the 2012 season due to those sanctions. On August 5, Redd officially enrolled at USC.

On August 24, starting cornerback Isiah Wiley was declared academically ineligible by the NCAA. Sophomore Anthony Brown replaced Wiley in the starting lineup.

USC was ranked number one in The Associated Press’ preseason college football poll for the seventh time in school history and the first time in five seasons, edging out No. 2 Alabama and No. 3 LSU.

== Personnel ==
=== Coaching staff ===
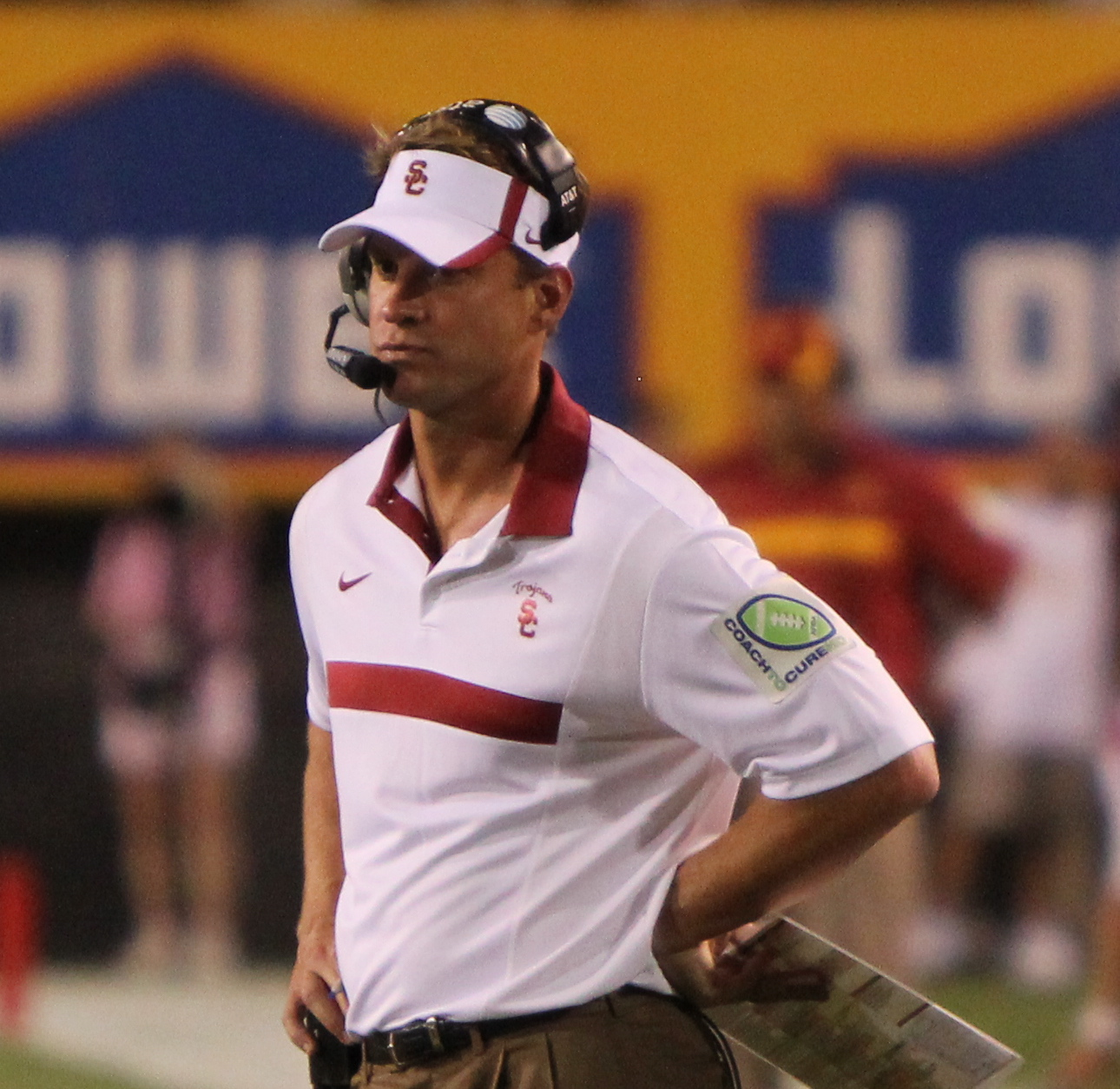
Head coach Lane Kiffin enters his third season as head coach of the USC Trojans

Name	Position	Seasons at USC	Alma mater
Lane Kiffin	Head coach	3	Fresno State (1996)
Monte Kiffin	Assistant head coach	3	Nebraska (1963)
John Baxter	Associate head coach, special teams	3	Loras (1985)
Ed Orgeron	Defensive coordinator, recruiting coordinator, defensive line	3	Northwestern State (1984)
Kennedy Polamalu	Offensive coordinator, running backs	3	USC (1985)
James Cregg	Offensive line	3	Colorado State (1995)
Scottie Hazelton	Linebackers	1	Fort Lewis College (1994)
Clay Helton	Passing game coordinator/quarterbacks	2	Houston (1994)
Tee Martin	Wide receivers	1	Tennessee (2000)
Marvin Sanders	Defensive backs	1	Nebraska (1989)
Justin Mesa	Tight ends (graduate assistant)	3	USC (2006)
Shawn Howe	Defensive line (graduate assistant)	2	Rocky Mountain College (2005)
Aaron Ausmus	Strength and conditioning	3	Tennessee (1998)

=== Returning starters ===
USC returns 18 starters in 2012, including nine on offense, seven on defense, and both the starting kicker and punter. Key departures included offensive tackle Matt Kalil, fullback Rhett Ellison, running back Marc Tyler, defensive end Nick Perry, linebacker Chris Galippo, defensive tackle DaJohn Harris, and nose tackle Christian Tupou. Before the season, starting cornerback Isiah Wiley was declared academically ineligible, and starting left DE Devon Kennard suffered a pectoral injury that could force him to redshirt this season.

==== Offense (9) ====
Player	Class	Position
Matt Barkley	Senior	Quarterback
Curtis McNeal	Senior	Running back
Robert Woods	Junior	Wide receiver
Marqise Lee	Sophomore	Wide receiver
Randall Telfer	Sophomore	Tight end
Marcus Martin	Sophomore	Left guard
Khaled Holmes	Senior	Center
John Martinez	Junior	Right guard
Kevin Graf	Junior	Right tackle

==== Defense (7) ====
Player	Class	Position
T. J. McDonald	Senior	Safety
Jawanza Starling	Senior	Safety
Hayes Pullard	Sophomore	Linebacker
Lamar Dawson	Sophomore	Linebacker
Dion Bailey	Sophomore	Linebacker
Nickell Robey-Coleman	Junior	Cornerback
Wes Horton	Senior	Defensive end

==== Special teams (2) ====
Player	Class	Position
Andre Heidari	Sophomore	Placekicker
Kyle Negrete	Senior	Punter

=== Roster ===
2012 USC Trojans Football
Quarterback: 6 Cody Kessler – (redshirt) Freshman; 7 Matt Barkley – Senior; 13 Max Wittek – (redshirt) Freshman; 16 Anthony Neyer – (redshirt) Sophomore; 17 Emon Saee – (redshirt) Senior; 18 John Manoogian – (redshirt) Senior; 16 Conner Sullivan – Freshman; Running back: 22 Curtis McNeal – (redshirt) Senior; 23 Alec Jaffe – (redshirt) Sophomore; 27 Kamaron Germany – (redshirt) Sophomore; 30 D.J. Morgan – (redshirt) Sophomore; 37 Javorius Allen – (redshirt) Freshman; 47 Taylor Ross – (redshirt) Freshman; 31 Soma Vainuku – (redshirt) Freshman (FB); 13 Tre Madden – (redshirt) Freshman; Offensive lineman: 50 Abe Markowitz -C – (redshirt) Senior; 65 Erick Jepsen – C – (redshirt) Freshman; 78 Khaled Holmes – C – (redshirt) Senior; 59 John Martinez – OG – (redshirt) Junior; 60 John Katnik – OG-C – (redshirt) Freshman; 63 Giovanni Di Poalo – OG – (redshirt) Sophomore; 66 Marcus Martin – OG – Sophomore; 68 Jordan Simmons – OG – Freshman; 69 Cyrus Hobbi – C-OG – (redshirt) Freshman; 76 Nathan Guertler – OG – (redshirt) Sophomore; 70 Aundrey Walker – OT – Sophomore; 72 Chad Wheeler – OT – Freshman; 77 Kevin Graf – OT – (redshirt) Junior; 73 David Garness – OT-OG – (redshirt) Junior; 74 Jeremy Galten – OT-OG – Senior; 75 Max Tuerk – OT – Freshman; -- Zach Banner – OT – Freshman; Wide receiver: 2 Robert Woods – Junior; 8 George Farmer – Sophomore; 9 Marqise Lee – Sophomore; 10 De'Von Flournoy – (redshirt) Junior; 14 Devin Forte – (redshirt) Senior; 38 Cody Skene – (redshirt) Junior; 85 Victor Blackwell – (redshirt) Freshman	Tight end: 82 Randall Telfer – (redshirt) Sophomore; 86 Xavier Grimble – (redshirt) Sophomore; 87 Junior Pomee – (redshirt) Freshman; 89 Christian Thomas – (redshirt) Sophomore; Defensive tackle: 58 J.R. Tavai – Sophomore; 64 Cody Temple – (redshirt) Freshman; 90 George Uko – (redshirt) Sophomore; 92 Zack Kusnir – " (redshirt) Senior"; 97 Christian Heyward – (redshirt) Freshman; 99 Antwaun Woods – (redshirt) Freshman; Defensive end: 39 Charles Burks – (redshirt) Freshman; 42 Devon Kennard – Senior; 81 Kevin Greene – (redshirt) Junior; 92 Morgan Breslin – Junior; 93 Greg Townsend Jr. – (redshirt) Freshman; 94 Leonard Williams – Freshman; 95 DeVante Wilson – Freshman; 96 Wes Horton – (redshirt) Senior; Linebacker: 10 Hayes Pullard – (redshirt) Sophomore; 18 Dion Bailey – (redshirt) Sophomore; 28 Luke Freeman – (redshirt) Junior; 39 Simione Vehikite – " (redshirt) Junior"; 45 Doug Scott – (redshirt) Senior; 47 Scott Starr – Freshman; 51 Will Andrew – (redshirt) Junior; 52 Dallas Kelley – Senior; 53 Marquis Simmons – (redshirt) Junior; 55 Lamar Dawson – Sophomore; 56 Anthony Sarao – (redshirt) Freshman; 59 Kyle Yatabe – (redshirt) Junior	Cornerback: 4 Torin Harris – (redshirt) Junior; 14 Isiah Wiley – Senior; 15 Ryan Henderson – (redshirt) Freshman; 16 Anthony Brown – (redshirt) Sophomore; 21 Nickell Robey-Coleman – Junior; 30 Brian Baucham – (redshirt) Senior; Safety: 7 T. J. McDonald – Senior; 19 Drew McAllister – (redshirt) Senior; 24 Demetrius Wright – Junior; 26 Josh Shaw – (redshirt) Sophomore; 29 Jawanza Starling – Senior; 34 Tony Burnett – (redshirt) Senior; 37 Luis Nevarez – (redshirt) Junior; 39 Troy Cardona – (redshirt) Freshman; 41 John Auran – (redshirt) Junior; Long snappers: 61 Peter McBride – (redshirt) Freshman; Punter: 35 Kyle Negrete – (redshirt) Senior; 35 Kris Albarado – (redshirt) Freshman; Placekicker: 45 Joshua Alswang – (redshirt) Freshman; 46 Craig McMahon – (redshirt) Sophomore; 48 Andre Heidari – Sophomore
Sources: 2012 USC Trojans Football Spring Prospectus

=== Depth chart ===
Defense

FS
T. J. McDonald
Drew McAllister

WLB	MLB	SLB
Hayes Pullard	Lamar Dawson	Dion Bailey
Anthony Sarao	Hayes Pullard	Tony Burnett

SS
Jawanza Starling
Demetrius Wright

CB
Nickell Robey-Coleman
Kevon Seymour

DE	DT	DT	DE
Wes Horton	Leonard Williams	George Uko	Morgan Breslin
Greg Townsend Jr.	George Uko	Antwaun Woods	J.R. Tavai

CB
Joshua Shaw (American football)
Torin Harris

Offense

WR
Robert Woods
George Farmer

LT	LG	C	RG	RT
Aundrey Walker	Marcus Martin	Khaled Holmes	John Martinez	Kevin Graf
Max Tuerk	Abe Markowitz	Abe Markowitz	Jeremy Galten	Nathan Guertler

TE
Xavier Grimble
Randall Telfer

WR
Marqise Lee
Nelson Agholor

QB
Matt Barkley
Max Wittek

RB
Silas Redd
Curtis McNeal

FB
Soma Vainuku
Jahleel Pinner

Special teams
PK Andre Heidari
P Kyle Negrete
P Kris Albarado
KR Robert Woods/ Marqise Lee
PR Nickell Robey-Coleman
LS Peter McBride
H Matt Barkley

=== Recruiting class ===
Prior to National Signing Day on February 1, 2012, one junior college player and two high school players that graduated early enrolled for the spring semester in order to participate in spring practice. These early enrollments included: defensive end Morgan Breslin from Diablo Valley Community College, linebacker Scott Starr from Norco High School, and offensive tackle Chad Wheeler from Santa Monica High School. Safety/cornerback Joshua Shaw, who started three games at free safety for Florida in 2011, transferred to USC in the spring.

USC's recruiting class was highlighted by six players from the "Rivals 100": No. 16 Zach Banner (OT), No. 18 Nelson Agholor (WR), No. 29 Jordan Simmons (G), No. 40 Jabari Ruffin (LB), No. 46 Max Tuerk (OT), No. 53 Leonard Williams (DE), and No. 82 Kevon Seymour (CB). Despite being hampered by a 10-scholarship reduction imposed by the NCAA, USC still signed the No. 8 recruiting class according to Rivals.com, the tenth-consecutive year that USC has had a class ranked in the Top 10.

College recruiting (2012)
Name	Hometown	School	Height	Weight	Commit date
Nelson Agholor; WR	Tampa, FL	Berkeley Prep	6 ft 2 in (1.88 m)	180 lb (82 kg)	Feb 1, 2012
Nelson Agholor; WR	Recruit ratings: Rivals:				
Zach Banner; OT	Lakewood, WA	Lakes High School	6 ft 9 in (2.06 m)	310 lb (140 kg)	Jan 30, 2012
Zach Banner; OT	Recruit ratings: Rivals:				
Gerald Bowman; S	Woodland Hills, CA	Pierce Community College	6 ft 1 in (1.85 m)	210 lb (95 kg)	Dec 21, 2011
Gerald Bowman; S	Recruit ratings: Rivals:				
Morgan Breslin; DE	Pleasant Hill, CA	Diablo Valley Community College	6 ft 3 in (1.91 m)	245 lb (111 kg)	Dec 21, 2011
Morgan Breslin; DE	Recruit ratings: Rivals:				
Jalen Cope-Fitzpatrick; TE	Rocklin, CA	Whitney High School	6 ft 5 in (1.96 m)	250 lb (110 kg)	Jun 23, 2011
Jalen Cope-Fitzpatrick; TE	Recruit ratings: Rivals:				
Jahleel Pinner; FB	Mission Viejo, CA	Mission Viejo High School	6 ft 1 in (1.85 m)	225 lb (102 kg)	May 20, 2011
Jahleel Pinner; FB	Recruit ratings: Rivals:				
Darreus Rogers; WR	Mission Viejo, CA	Mission Viejo High School	6 ft 2 in (1.88 m)	194 lb (88 kg)	Jan 6, 2011
Darreus Rogers; WR	Recruit ratings: Rivals:				
Jabari Ruffin; LB	Downey, CA	Downey High School	6 ft 4 in (1.93 m)	230 lb (100 kg)	Mar 2, 2011
Jabari Ruffin; LB	Recruit ratings: Rivals:				
Kevon Seymour; CB	Pasadena, CA	Muir High School	6 ft 0 in (1.83 m)	180 lb (82 kg)	Jan 7, 2012
Kevon Seymour; CB	Recruit ratings: Rivals:				
Devian Shelton; CB	Inglewood, CA	Inglewood High School	6 ft 1 in (1.85 m)	185 lb (84 kg)	Jan 1, 2012
Devian Shelton; CB	Recruit ratings: Rivals:				
Jordan Simmons; G	Encino, CA	Crespi High School	6 ft 5 in (1.96 m)	333 lb (151 kg)	Oct 21, 2011
Jordan Simmons; G	Recruit ratings: Rivals:				
Scott Starr; LB	Downey, CA	Downey High School	6 ft 3 in (1.91 m)	225 lb (102 kg)	May 30, 2011
Scott Starr; LB	Recruit ratings: Rivals:				
Max Tuerk; OT	Santa Margarita, CA	Santa Margarita High School	6 ft 6 in (1.98 m)	294 lb (133 kg)	May 25, 2011
Max Tuerk; OT	Recruit ratings: Rivals:				
Chad Wheeler; OT	Santa Monica, CA	Santa Monica High School	6 ft 6 in (1.98 m)	280 lb (130 kg)	May 15, 2011
Chad Wheeler; OT	Recruit ratings: Rivals:				
Leonard Williams; DE	Daytona Beach, FL	Mainland High School	6 ft 5 in (1.96 m)	254 lb (115 kg)	Feb 1, 2012
Leonard Williams; DE	Recruit ratings: Rivals:				
Overall recruit ranking: Rivals: 8 (No. 1 in average star ranking at 4.07)
Note: In many cases, Scout, Rivals, 247Sports, On3, and ESPN may conflict in their listings of height and weight.; In these cases, the average was taken. ESPN grades are on a 100-point scale.; Sources: "2012 Team Ranking". Rivals.com.

== Schedule ==
Date	Time	Opponent	Rank	Site	TV	Result	Attendance
September 1	4:30 p.m.	Hawaii*	No. 1	Los Angeles Memorial Coliseum; Los Angeles, CA	FOX	W 49–10	93,607
September 8	12:30 p.m.	vs. Syracuse*	No. 2	MetLife Stadium; East Rutherford, NJ	ABC/ESPN2	W 42–29	39,507
September 15	4:30 p.m.	at No. 21 Stanford	No. 2	Stanford Stadium; Stanford, CA (rivalry)	FOX	L 14–21	50,360
September 22	3:00 p.m.	California	No. 13	Los Angeles Memorial Coliseum; Los Angeles, CA	P12N	W 27–9	83,421
October 4	6:00 p.m.	at Utah	No. 13	Rice-Eccles Stadium; Salt Lake City, UT	ESPN	W 38–28	46,037
October 13	4:00 p.m.	at Washington	No. 11	CenturyLink Field; Seattle, WA	FOX	W 24–14	66,202
October 20	3:00 p.m.	Colorado	No. 11	Los Angeles Memorial Coliseum; Los Angeles, CA	P12N	W 50–6	83,274
October 27	12:30 p.m.	at Arizona	No. 10	Arizona Stadium; Tucson, AZ	ABC/ESPN2	L 36–39	47,822
November 3	4:00 p.m.	No. 2 Oregon	No. 18	Los Angeles Memorial Coliseum; Los Angeles, CA	FOX	L 51–62	93,607
November 10	12:00 p.m.	Arizona State^{†}	No. 21	Los Angeles Memorial Coliseum; Los Angeles, CA	P12N	W 38–17	80,154
November 17	12:00 p.m.	at No. 17 UCLA	No. 21	Rose Bowl; Pasadena, CA (Victory Bell/rivalry)	FOX	L 28–38	83,277
November 24	5:00 p.m.	No. 1 Notre Dame*		Los Angeles Memorial Coliseum; Los Angeles, CA (Jeweled Shillelagh) (College GameDay)	ABC	L 13–22	93,607
December 31	11:00 a.m.	vs. Georgia Tech*		Sun Bowl Stadium; El Paso, TX (Sun Bowl)	CBS	L 7–21	47,922
*Non-conference game; ^{†}Homecoming; Rankings from AP Poll released prior to the game; All times are in Pacific time

== Game summaries ==
=== Hawaii ===
Hawaii Rainbow Warriors (0-0) - No. 1 USC Trojans (0-0)

Team	1	2	3	4	Total
Hawaii	0	0	10	0	10
• No. 1 USC	20	15	7	7	49

- Date: September 1st
- Location: Los Angeles Memorial Coliseum
  Los Angeles, California
- Game start: 4:30 p.m. PST
- Game attendance: 93,607
- Television network: FOX

Scoring summary

Quarter	Time	Drive			Team	Scoring information	Score	
Quarter	Time	Plays	Yards	TOP	Team	Scoring information	Hawaii	No. 1 USC
"TOP" = time of possession. For other American football terms, see Glossary of American football.							10	49

USC, ranked No. 1 in the AP Poll, defeated Hawaii, 49–10. Matt Barkley kicked off his Heisman Trophy campaign with 372 yards passing and four touchdowns. Marqise Lee caught 10 passes for 197 yards, including a 75-yard touchdown on the first play from scrimmage, and returned a kickoff 100 yards for another score. Robert Woods added two touchdown catches.

1st quarter scoring: USC – Marqise Lee 75 Yd Pass From Matt Barkley (Andre Heidari Kick); USC: Robert Woods 20 Yd Pass From Matt Barkley (Andre Heidari Kick); USC: Hayes Pullard 27 Yd Interception Return (Two-Point Pass Conversion Failed)

2nd quarter scoring: USC: Silas Redd 31 Yd Run (Two-Point Pass Conversion Failed); USC: Robert Woods 2 Yd Pass From Matt Barkley (Two-Point Run Conversion Failed); USC: Andre Heidari 28 Yd FG

3rd quarter scoring: HAW: Scott Harding 18 Yd Pass From Sean Schroeder (Tyler Hadden Kick); USC: Marqise Lee 100 Yd Kickoff Return (Andre Heidari Kick); HAW: Tyler Hadden 36 Yd FG

4th quarter scoring: USC: Randall Telfer 11 Yd Pass From Matt Barkley (Andre Heidari Kick)

=== Syracuse ===
No. 2 USC Trojans (1-0) vs Syracuse Orange (0-1)

Team	1	2	3	4	Total
• No. 2 USC	0	14	7	21	42
Syracuse	0	3	13	13	29

- Date: September 8th
- Location: MetLife Stadium
  East Rutherford, New Jersey
- Game start: 12:30 p.m. PST
- Game attendance: 39,507
- Television network: ABC/ESPN2

Scoring summary

Quarter	Time	Drive			Team	Scoring information	Score	
Quarter	Time	Plays	Yards	TOP	Team	Scoring information	No. 2 USC	SYR
"TOP" = time of possession. For other American football terms, see Glossary of American football.							42	29

The game was played at MetLife Stadium in East Rutherford, New Jersey. Matt Barkley tied his own school record with six touchdown passes, Marqise Lee caught three touchdown passes, Robert Woods had two, and Xavier Grimble had one. Dion Bailey had two interceptions on defense. At halftime, a line of thunderstorms rolled in, and the game was delayed an hour and nine minutes.

1st quarter scoring: None

2nd quarter scoring: USC: Marqise Lee 13 Yd Pass From Matt Barkley (Alex Wood Kick); USC – Robert Woods 29 Yd Pass From Matt Barkley (Alex Wood Kick); SYR – Ross Krautman 37 Yd FG

3rd quarter scoring: USC – Robert Woods 4 Yd Pass From Matt Barkley (Alex Wood Kick); SYR – Marcus Sales 3 Yd Pass From Ryan Nassib (Ross Krautman Kick); SYR – Prince-Tyson Gulley 8 Yd Run (Two-Point Conversion Failed)

4th quarter scoring: USC: Xavier Grimble 22 Yd Pass From Matt Barkley (Alex Wood Kick); USC – Marqise Lee 4 Yd Pass From Matt Barkley (Alex Wood Kick); SYR – Marcus Sales 17 Yd Pass From Ryan Nassib (Two-Point Conversion Failed); USC – Marqise Lee 3 Yd Pass From Matt Barkley (Alex Wood Kick); SYR – Ryan Nassib 1 Yd Run (Ross Krautman Kick)

=== Stanford ===
No. 2 USC Trojans (2-0) vs No. 21 Stanford Cardinal (2-0)
(Rivalry)

Team	1	2	3	4	Total
No. 2 USC	7	7	0	0	14
• No. 21 Stanford	7	0	7	7	21

- Date: September 15th
- Location: Stanford Stadium
  Stanford, California
- Game start: 4:30 p.m. PST
- Game attendance: 50,360
- Television network: FOX

Scoring summary

Quarter	Time	Drive			Team	Scoring information	Score	
Quarter	Time	Plays	Yards	TOP	Team	Scoring information	No. 2 USC	No. 21 Stanford
"TOP" = time of possession. For other American football terms, see Glossary of American football.							14	21

The Cardinal have won four of the last five meetings (the Trojans won the 2008 game), with USC seeking to avenge close losses to the Stanford Cardinal over the last two seasons. In 2010, Stanford defeated USC, 37–35, on a last-second field goal that was made possible when the clock operator mistakenly stopped running the clock on Stanford's game-winning drive. In 2011, Stanford defeated USC, 56–48, in triple overtime when USC running back Curtis McNeal fumbled in the red zone. With the game tied, 34–34, at the end of regulation, USC attempted to call a timeout in order to attempt a game-winning field goal, but time had run out.

1st quarter scoring: USC – Silas Redd 1-yard run (Alex Wood kick); STAN – Stanfan Taylor 59-yard run (J. Williamson kick)

2nd quarter scoring: USC – Redd 1-yard run (Wood kick)

3rd quarter scoring: STAN – Taylor 23-yard pass from J. Nunes (Williamson kick)

4th quarter scoring: STAN – Z. Ertz 37-yard pass from Nunes (Williamson kick)

Stanford's running back Stepfan Taylor and defensive back Ben Gardner were named Pac-12 Conference Player-of-the-Week following this contest.

=== California ===
California Golden Bears (1-2) vs No. 13 USC Trojans (2-1)

Team	1	2	3	4	Total
California	0	3	6	0	9
• No. 13 USC	7	10	0	10	27

- Date: September 22nd
- Location: Los Angeles Memorial Coliseum
  Los Angeles. California
- Game start: 3:00 p.m. PST
- Game attendance: 83,421
- Television network: P12N

Scoring summary

Quarter	Time	Drive			Team	Scoring information	Score	
Quarter	Time	Plays	Yards	TOP	Team	Scoring information	California	No. 13 USC
"TOP" = time of possession. For other American football terms, see Glossary of American football.							9	27

The Trojans have won the past 8 meetings against the California Golden Bears. In 2011, the Trojans defeated the Bears, 30–9.

1st quarter scoring: USC – Silas Redd 33-yard run (Andre Heidari kick)

2nd quarter scoring: CAL – Vincen D'Amato 24-yard field goal; USC – Marqise Lee 11-yard pass from Matt Barkley (Heidari kick); USC – Heidari 40-yard field goal

3rd quarter scoring: CAL – D'Amato 26-yard field goal; CAL – D'Amato 35-yard field goal

4th quarter scoring: USC – Heidari 41-yard field goal; USC – Lee 3-yard pass from Barkley (Heidari kick)

=== Utah ===
	1	2	3	4	Total
#13 Trojans	7	17	0	14	38
Utes	14	7	0	7	28

USC won the teams' last meeting in 2011, 23–14.

=== Washington ===
	1	2	3	4	Total
#11 Trojans	10	14	0	0	24
Huskies	7	0	7	0	14

In 2011, USC beat Washington by a score of 40–17. USC came out strong in the 1st half with a 24–7 lead at halftime. The Trojans held off the Huskies 24–14 to win the game.

=== Colorado ===
	1	2	3	4	Total
Buffaloes	3	3	0	0	6
#10 Trojans	19	14	7	10	50

USC beat Colorado, 42–17, in 2011 with Matt Barkley setting a school record with six touchdown passes. Both Matt Barkley and Robert Woods had record setting days as the Trojans cruised to a 50–6 victory.

=== Arizona ===
	1	2	3	4	Total
#10 Trojans	0	21	7	8	36
Wildcats	10	3	13	13	39

USC won the teams' last meeting in 2011, 48–41.

=== Oregon ===
	1	2	3	4	Total
#2 Ducks	14	20	14	14	62
#18 Trojans	3	21	14	13	51

In 2011, USC defeated the Oregon Ducks, 38–35.

1st quarter scoring: ORE – De'Anthony Thomas 16-yard pass from Marcus Mariota (Rob Beard Kick); USC – Andre Heidari 39-yard Field Goal; ORE – Josh Huff 21-yard pass from Mariota (Beard Kick)

2nd quarter scoring: ORE – Kenjon Barner 27-yard run (Beard kick); USC – Marqise Lee 75-yard pass from Matt Barkley (Heidari kick); ORE – Kenjon Barner 5-yard run (PAT blocked); USC – Robert Woods 7-yard pass from Barkley (Heidari kick); ORE – Daryle Hawkins 14-yard pass from Mariota (Beard kick); USC – Nelson Agholor 76-yard pass from Barkley (Heidari kick)

3rd quarter scoring: USC – Silas Redd 2-yard run (Heidari kick); ORE – Kenjon Barner 9-yard run (Beard kick); USC – Silas Redd 3-yard run (Heidari kick); ORE – Josh Huff 36-yard pass from Mariota (Beard kick)

4th quarter scoring: ORE – Kenjon Barner 5-yard run (Beard kick); USC – Randall Telfer 3-yard pass from Barkley (Heidari kick); ORE – Kenjon Barner 22-yard run (Beard kick); USC – Lee 3-yard pass from Barkley (Two-point conversion failed)

=== Arizona State ===
	1	2	3	4	Total
Sun Devils	7	7	3	0	17
#21 Trojans	7	7	14	10	38

USC seeks to avenge a loss to the Arizona State Sun Devils in 2011.

=== UCLA ===
	1	2	3	4	Total
#21 Trojans	0	14	6	8	28
#17 Bruins	17	7	7	7	38

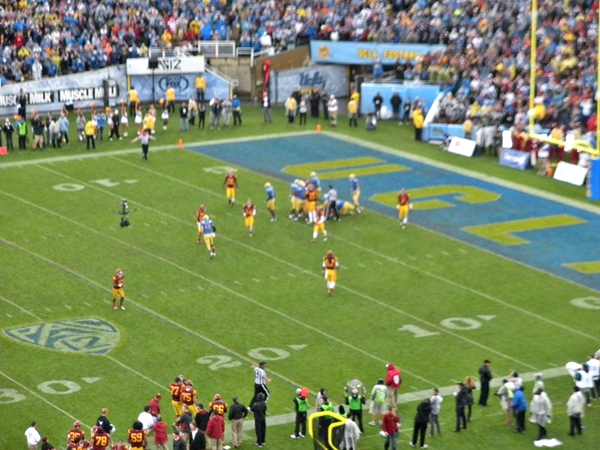
UCLA defeats USC 38–28 in the Rose Bowl

The matchup was the first time since 2005 that UCLA and USC met as ranked teams. It was also the first time since 2001 that the Bruins entered the game ranked higher than the Trojans.

1st quarter scoring: UCLA – Brett Hundley 1-yard run (Ka'i Fairbairn kick); UCLA – Fairbairn 23-yard field goal; UCLA – Joseph Fauria 17-yard pass from Hundley (Fairbairn kick).

2nd quarter scoring: UCLA – Johnathan Franklin 16-yard run (Fairbairn kick); USC – Nelson Agholor 33-yard pass from Matt Barkley (Andre Heidari kick); USC – Randall Telfer 2-yard pass from Barkley (Heidari kick).

3rd quarter scoring: USC – George Uko 0-yard fumble recovery (Heidari kick failed); UCLA – Hundley 3-yard run (Fairbairn kick).

4th quarter scoring: USC – Marqise Lee 14-yard pass from Barkley (Robert Woods pass from Barkley); UCLA – Franklin 29-yard run (Fairbairn kick).

=== Notre Dame ===
	1	2	3	4	Total
#1 Fighting Irish	10	6	3	3	22
Trojans	0	10	0	3	13

In 2011, USC defeated the Notre Dame Fighting Irish, 31–17. USC has won nine of the last ten meetings against Notre Dame. ESPN's "College GameDay" show was at the game.

=== Georgia Tech (Sun Bowl) ===
	1	2	3	4	Total
Trojans	0	7	0	0	7
Yellow Jackets	0	7	7	7	21

Reports surfaced weeks after the game of a postgame altercation in the locker room which may have started over the younger players criticizing Matt Barkley for not playing in the game and his leadership in general, which led to several upperclassmen, including T.J. McDonald, coming to his defense. It was another incident that marked the close of a disappointing season for USC.

== Rankings ==
Ranking movements Legend: ██ Increase in ranking ██ Decrease in ranking — = Not ranked RV = Received votes ( ) = First-place votes
	Week															
Poll	Pre	1	2	3	4	5	6	7	8	9	10	11	12	13	14	Final
AP	1 (25)	2 (11)	2 (8)	13	13	13	11	11	10	18	21	21	RV	RV		
Coaches	3 (19)	2 (14)	3 (11)	12	13	12	9	9	8	17	22	21	RV	RV		
Harris	Not released						10	11	9	16	18	18	RV	RV		Not released
BCS	Not released							10	9	17	19	18	—	—		Not released

== Statistics ==
=== Scores by quarter (Pac-12 opponents) ===
	1	2	3	4	Total
USC	14	17	0	10	41
Pac-12 Opponents	7	3	13	7	30
