= USC Trojans football statistical leaders =

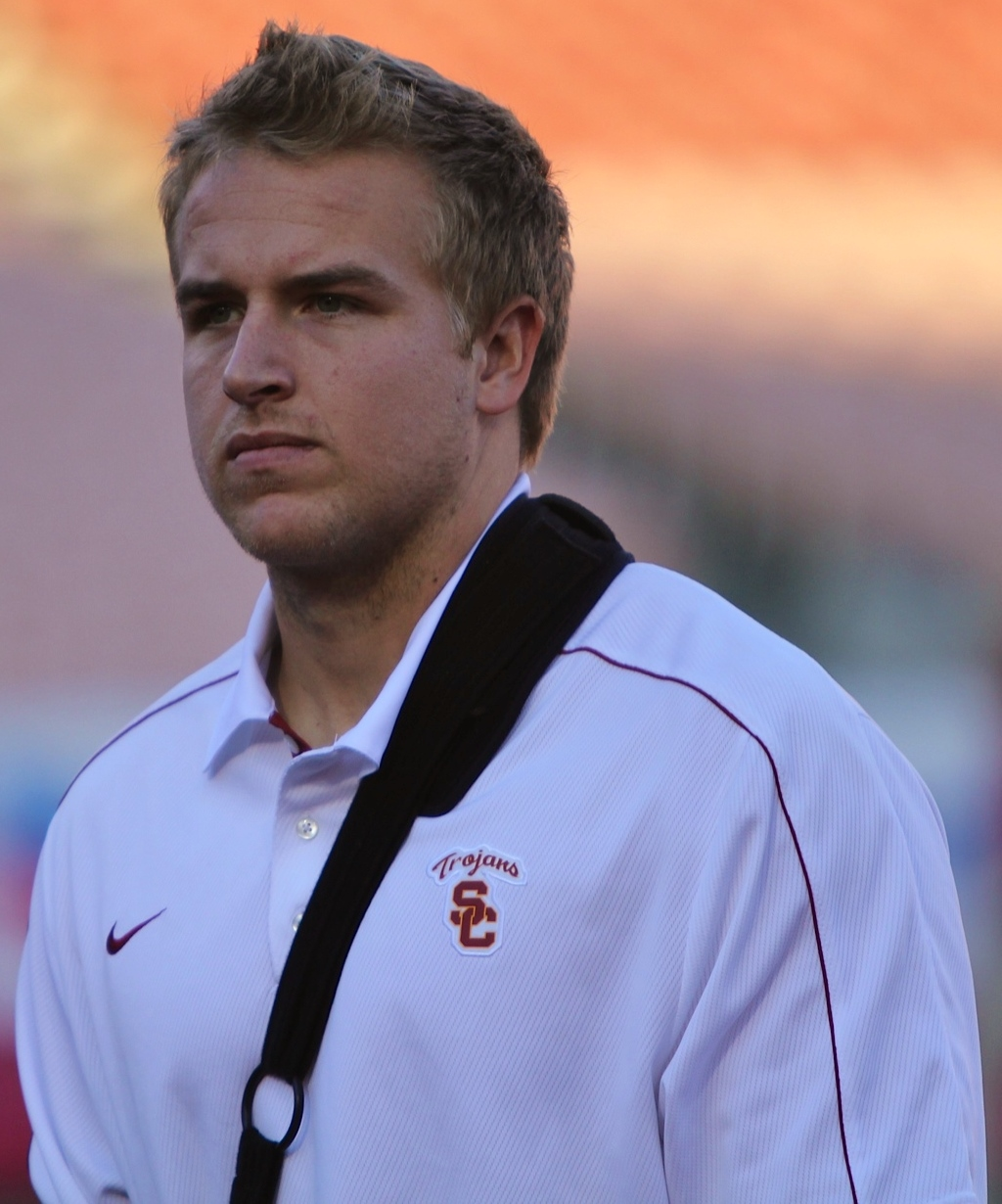
A four-year starter, Matt Barkley is the Trojans' career leader in passing yards and passing touchdowns.

The USC Trojans football statistical leaders are individual statistical leaders of the USC Trojans football program in various categories, including passing, rushing, receiving, total offense, defensive stats, and kicking/special teams. Within those areas, the lists identify single-game, single-season, and career leaders. Through the 2023 season, the Trojans represented the University of Southern California in the NCAA Division I FBS Pac-12 Conference but joiedn the Big Ten Conference for 2024 and beyond.

Although USC began competing in intercollegiate football in 1888, the school's official record book considers the "modern era" to have begun in the 1920s. Records from before this decade are often incomplete and inconsistent, and they are generally not included in these lists.

These lists are dominated by more recent players for several reasons:

- Since the 1920s, seasons have increased from 10 to 11 and then 12 games in length.
- The NCAA didn't allow freshmen to play varsity football until 1972 (with the exception of the World War II years), allowing players to have four-year careers.
- The Trojans have played in 57 bowl games in school history, 39 of which have come since the 1970 season. Although the official NCAA record book does not include bowl games in statistical records until 2002, and most colleges also structure their record books this way, USC counts all bowl games in its records.
- Due to COVID-19 issues, the NCAA ruled that the 2020 season would not count against the athletic eligibility of any football player, giving everyone who played in that season the opportunity for five years of eligibility instead of the normal four.

These lists are updated through Week 12 of the 2026 season. Active players are listed in bold. Recent USC Football Media Guides do not include full top 10 lists for single-game records. However, the 2003 version of the media guide included long lists of top individual single-game performances, and box scores from more recent games are readily available, so the lists are easily derived.

== Passing ==
=== Passing yards ===
Career
Rk	Player	Yards	Years
1	Matt Barkley	12,327	2009 2010 2011 2012
2	Carson Palmer	11,818	1998 1999 2000 2001 2002
3	Matt Leinart	10,693	2002 2003 2004 2005
4	Cody Kessler	10,339	2012 2013 2014 2015
5	Rob Johnson	8,472	1991 1992 1993 1994
6	Rodney Peete	8,225	1985 1986 1987 1988
7	Caleb Williams	8,170	2022 2023
8	**Jayden Maiava**	7,984	2024 2025 2026
9	Kedon Slovis	7,576	2019 2020 2021
10	Sam Darnold	7,229	2016 2017

Single season
Rk	Player	Yards	Year
1	Caleb Williams	4,537	2022
2	Sam Darnold	4,143	2017
3	Carson Palmer	3,942	2002
4	Cody Kessler	3,826	2014
5	Matt Leinart	3,815	2005
6	Jayden Maiava	3,711	2025
7	Caleb Williams	3,633	2023
8	Rob Johnson	3,630	1993
9	Matt Leinart	3,556	2003
10	Cody Kessler	3,536	2015

Single game
Rk	Player	Yards	Year	Opponent
1	Kedon Slovis	515	2019	UCLA
2	Matt Barkley	493	2012	Arizona
3	Matt Barkley	484	2012	Oregon
4	Caleb Williams	470	2022	UCLA
5	Matt Barkley	468	2011	Arizona
6	Caleb Williams	462	2022	Tulane (Cotton Bowl)
7	Sam Darnold	453	2016	Penn State (Rose Bowl)
8	Carson Palmer	448	2002	Oregon
9	Kedon Slovis	432	2019	Arizona State
10	Carson Palmer	425	2002	Notre Dame

=== Passing touchdowns ===
Career
Rk	Player	TDs	Years
1	Matt Barkley	116	2009 2010 2011 2012
2	Matt Leinart	99	2003 2004 2005
3	Cody Kessler	88	2012 2013 2014 2015
4	Carson Palmer	72	1998 1999 2000 2001 2002
	Caleb Williams	72	2022 2023
6	Rob Johnson	58	1991 1992 1993 1994
	Kedon Slovis	58	2019 2020 2021
	**Jayden Maiava**	58	2024 2025 2026
9	Sam Darnold	57	2016 2017
10	John David Booty	55	2004 2005 2006 2007

Single season
Rk	Player	TDs	Year
1	Caleb Williams	42	2022
2	Matt Barkley	39	2011
	Cody Kessler	39	2014
4	Matt Leinart	38	2003
5	Matt Barkley	36	2012
6	Mark Sanchez	34	2008
7	Carson Palmer	33	2002
	Matt Leinart	33	2004
9	Sam Darnold	31	2016
10	Kedon Slovis	30	2019
	Caleb Williams	30	2023

Single game
Rk	Player	TDs	Year	Opponent
1	Cody Kessler	7	2014	Colorado
2	Matt Barkley	6	2011	Colorado
	Matt Barkley	6	2011	UCLA
	Matt Barkley	6	2012	Syracuse
	Matt Barkley	6	2012	Colorado
	Cody Kessler	6	2014	Notre Dame
	Caleb Williams	6	2023	Colorado
	Miller Moss	6	2023	Louisville (Holiday Bowl)

== Rushing ==
=== Rushing yards ===
Career
Rk	Player	Yards	Years
1	Charles White	6,245	1976 1977 1978 1979
2	Marcus Allen	4,810	1978 1979 1980 1981
3	Anthony Davis	3,724	1972 1973 1974
4	Ricky Bell	3,689	1974 1975 1976 1977
5	Ronald Jones II	3,619	2015 2016 2017
6	O. J. Simpson	3,423	1967 1968
7	Mike Garrett	3,221	1963 1964 1965
8	Reggie Bush	3,169 (Note: The NCAA does not credit Bush with this total; it later ruled him to have been ineligible for the last two games of the 2004 season and all of the 2005 season. USC includes all of Bush's statistics in its record books, but adds a prominent disclaimer indicating the NCAA treatment of his records.)	2003 2004 2005
9	LenDale White	3,159	2003 2004 2005
10	Fred Crutcher	2,815	1981 1982 1983 1984 1985

Single season
Rk	Player	Yards	Year
1	Marcus Allen	2,427	1981
2	Charles White	2,050	1979
3	Ricky Bell	1,957	1975
4	O. J. Simpson	1,880	1968
5	Charles White	1,859	1978
6	Reggie Bush	1,740	2005
7	Marcus Allen	1,563	1980
8	Ronald Jones II	1,550	2017
9	O. J. Simpson	1,543	1967
10	Javorius Allen	1,489	2014

Single game
Rk	Player	Yards	Year	Opponent
1	Ricky Bell	347	1976	Washington State
2	Reggie Bush	294 (Note: The NCAA does not credit Bush with this game.)	2005	Fresno State
3	Marcus Allen	274	1981	Indiana
4	Charles White	261	1979	Notre Dame
5	Reggie Bush	260	2005	UCLA
6	Ricky Bell	256	1975	Duke
7	C.R. Roberts	251	1956	Texas
8	Charles White	247	1980	Ohio State
9	Charles White	243	1979	Washington
	Marcus Allen	243	1981	California

=== Rushing touchdowns ===
Career
Rk	Player	TDs	Years
1	LenDale White	52	2003 2004 2005
2	Charles White	49	1976 1977 1978 1979
3	Marcus Allen	45	1978 1979 1980 1981
4	Anthony Davis	44	1972 1973 1974
5	Ronald Jones II	39	2015 2016 2017
6	O. J. Simpson	36	1967 1968
7	Ricky Bell	28	1974 1975 1976 1977
8	Mike Garrett	25	1963 1964 1965
	Reggie Bush	25	2003 2004 2005
	Javorius Allen	25	2012 2013 2014

Single season
Rk	Player	TDs	Year
1	LenDale White	24	2005
2	O. J. Simpson	23	1968
3	Marcus Allen	22	1981
4	Charles White	19	1979
	Ronald Jones II	19	2017
6	Anthony Davis	17	1972
7	Reggie Bush	16	2005
8	Chad Morton	15	1999
	LenDale White	15	2004
10	Anthony Davis	14	1973
	Ricky Bell	14	1976
	Marcus Allen	14	1980
	Javorius Allen	14	2013

Single game
Rk	Player	TDs	Year	Opponent
1	Charles Dean	4	1920	Nevada
	Howard Elliot	4	1925	Pomona
	Orv Mohler	4	1931	Washington State
	Ambrose Schindler	4	1937	Oregon
	Clark Holden	4	1959	Stanford
	O. J. Simpson	4	1968	Minnesota
	Anthony Davis	4	1972	Notre Dame
	Anthony Davis	4	1973	California
	Sam Cunningham	4	1972	Ohio State (Rose Bowl)
	Ricky Bell	4	1975	Duke
	Ricky Bell	4	1976	Oregon
	Charles White	4	1979	Notre Dame
	Charles White	4	1979	UCLA
	Marcus Allen	4	1981	Tennessee
	Ryan Knight	4	1986	California
	LenDale White	4	2005	Arizona
	Ronald Jones II	4	2016	Oregon

== Receiving ==
=== Receptions ===
Career
Rk	Player	Rec	Years
1	Robert Woods	252	2010 2011 2012
2	Marqise Lee	248	2011 2012 2013
3	Tyler Vaughns	222	2017 2018 2019 2020
4	Dwayne Jarrett	216	2004 2005 2006
5	JuJu Smith-Schuster	213	2014 2015 2016
6	Keary Colbert	207	2000 2001 2002 2003
7	Kareem Kelly	204	1999 2000 2001 2002
8	Johnnie Morton	201	1990 1991 1992 1993
9	Steve Smith	190	2003 2004 2005 2006
10	Nelson Agholor	178	2012 2013 2014
	Amon-Ra St. Brown	178	2018 2019 2020

Single season
Rk	Player	Rec	Year
1	Marqise Lee	118	2012
2	Robert Woods	111	2011
3	Nelson Agholor	104	2014
4	Keyshawn Johnson	102	1995
5	Michael Pittman Jr.	101	2019
6	Mike Williams	95	2003
7	Dwayne Jarrett	91	2005
8	JuJu Smith-Schuster	89	2015
9	Johnnie Morton	88	1993
	Drake London	88	2021

Single game
Rk	Player	Rec	Year	Opponent
1	Robert Woods	17	2011	Minnesota
2	Marqise Lee	16	2012	Arizona
	Nelson Agholor	16	2014	California
	Drake London	16	2021	Utah
5	Johnnie Morton	15	1993	Houston
	Drake London	15	2021	Notre Dame
7	John Jackson	14	1989	Notre Dame
	Robert Woods	14	2011	Arizona
9	Keyshawn Johnson	13	1995	Arizona State
	Mike Williams	13	2002	Oregon
	Marqise Lee	13	2011	UCLA
	Deontay Burnett	13	2016	Penn State (Rose Bowl)
	Michael Pittman Jr.	13	2019	Arizona State
	Michael Pittman Jr.	13	2019	UCLA
	Drake London	13	2021	Washington State

=== Receiving yards ===
Career
Rk	Player	Yards	Years
1	Marqise Lee	3,655	2011 2012 2013
2	Johnnie Morton	3,201	1990 1991 1992 1993
3	Dwayne Jarrett	3,138	2004 2005 2006
4	Kareem Kelly	3,104	1999 2000 2001 2002
5	JuJu Smith-Schuster	3,092	2014 2015 2016
6	Steve Smith	3,019	2003 2004 2005 2006
7	Keary Colbert	2,964	2000 2001 2002 2003
8	Robert Woods	2,930	2010 2011 2012
9	Tyler Vaughns	2,801	2017 2018 2019 2020
10	Keyshawn Johnson	2,796	1994 1995

Single season
Rk	Player	Yards	Year
1	Marqise Lee	1,721	2012
2	Johnnie Morton	1,520	1993
3	JuJu Smith-Schuster	1,454	2015
4	Keyshawn Johnson	1,434	1995
5	Keyshawn Johnson	1,362	1994
6	Mike Williams	1,314	2003
7	Nelson Agholor	1,313	2014
8	Robert Woods	1,292	2011
9	Michael Pittman Jr.	1,275	2019
10	Dwayne Jarrett	1,274	2005

Single game
Rk	Player	Yards	Year	Opponent
1	Marqise Lee	345	2012	Arizona
2	R. Jay Soward	260	1996	UCLA
3	Steve Smith	258	2006	Oregon State
4	Robert Woods	255	2011	Arizona
5	Michael Pittman Jr.	232	2019	Utah
6	Johnnie Morton	229	1993	Washington State
7	Mike Williams	226	2002	Oregon
8	Robert Woods	224	2010	Stanford
	Marqise Lee	224	2011	UCLA
10	Keyshawn Johnson	222	1994	Texas Tech (Cotton Bowl)

=== Receiving touchdowns ===
Career
Rk	Player	TDs	Years
1	Dwayne Jarrett	41	2004 2005 2006
2	Robert Woods	32	2010 2011 2012
3	Mike Williams	30	2002 2003
4	Marqise Lee	29	2011 2012 2013
5	JuJu Smith-Schuster	25	2014 2015 2016
6	Johnnie Morton	23	1990 1991 1992 1993
	R. Jay Soward	23	1996 1997 1998 1999
8	Steve Smith	22	2003 2004 2005 2006
9	Ronald Johnson	20	2007 2008 2009 2010
	Nelson Agholor	20	2012 2013 2014
	Tyler Vaughns	20	2017 2018 2019 2020

Single season
Rk	Player	TDs	Year
1	Mike Williams	16	2003
	Dwayne Jarrett	16	2005
3	Robert Woods	15	2011
4	Johnnie Morton	14	1993
	Mike Williams	14	2002
	Marqise Lee	14	2012
7	Dwayne Jarrett	12	2006
	Nelson Agholor	12	2014
	Brenden Rice	12	2023
	Ja'Kobi Lane	12	2024

Single game
Rk	Player	TDs	Year	Opponent
1	Robert Woods	4	2012	Colorado
	Amon-Ra St. Brown	4	2020	Washington State

== Total offense ==
Total offense is the sum of passing and rushing statistics. It does not include receiving or returns.

=== Total offense yards ===
Career
Rk	Player	Yards	Years
1	Matt Barkley	12,214	2009 2010 2011 2012
2	Carson Palmer	11,621	1998 1999 2000 2001 2002
3	Matt Leinart	10,623	2003 2004 2005
4	Cody Kessler	9,914	2012 2013 2014 2015
5	Caleb Williams	8,688	2022 2023
6	Rodney Peete	8,640	1985 1986 1987 1988
7	Rob Johnson	7,896	1991 1992 1993 1994
8	**Jayden Maiava**	8,127	2024 2025 2026
9	Sam Darnold	7,561	2016 2017
10	Kedon Slovis	7,426	2019 2020 2021

Single season
Rk	Player	Yards	Year
1	Caleb Williams	4,919	2022
2	Sam Darnold	4,225	2017
3	Jayden Maiava	3,868	2025
4	Matt Leinart	3,851	2005
5	Carson Palmer	3,820	2002
6	Caleb Williams	3,769	2023
7	Cody Kessler	3,674	2014
8	Matt Barkley	3,542	2011
9	Matt Leinart	3,494	2003
10	Kedon Slovis	3,445	2019

Single game
Rk	Player	Yards	Year	Opponent
1	Caleb Williams	503	2022	UCLA
2	Kedon Slovis	502	2019	UCLA
3	Matt Barkley	497	2012	Arizona
4	Matt Barkley	478	2012	Oregon
5	Sam Darnold	473	2016	Penn State (Rose Bowl)
6	Caleb Williams	472	2022	Tulane (Cotton Bowl)
7	Matt Barkley	470	2011	Arizona
8	Caleb Williams	438	2022	Utah
9	Kedon Slovis	435	2019	Arizona State
10	Carson Palmer	434	2002	Oregon

=== Touchdowns responsible for ===
"Touchdowns responsible for" is the NCAA's official term for combined passing and rushing touchdowns.

Career
Rk	Player	TDs	Years
1	Matt Barkley	122	2009 2010 2011 2012
2	Matt Leinart	108	2003 2004 2005
3	Cody Kessler	95	2012 2013 2014 2015
4	Caleb Williams	93	2022 2023
5	Carson Palmer	81	1998 1999 2000 2001 2002
6	**Jayden Maiava**	70	2024 2025 2026
7	Rodney Peete	66	1985 1986 1987 1988
8	Sam Darnold	64	2016 2017
9	Rob Johnson	62	1991 1992 1993 1994
10	Kedon Slovis	58	2019 2020 2021

Single season
Rk	Player	TDs	Year
1	Caleb Williams	52	2022
2	Matt Barkley	41	2011
	Cody Kessler	41	2014
	Caleb Williams	41	2023
5	Matt Leinart	38	2003
6	Carson Palmer	37	2002
	Mark Sanchez	37	2008
8	Matt Leinart	36	2004
	Matt Barkley	36	2012
10	Matt Leinart	34	2005

Single game
Rk	Player	TDs	Year	Opponent
1	Cody Kessler	7	2014	Colorado
2	Anthony Davis	6	1972	Notre Dame
	Matt Barkley	6	2011	Colorado
	Matt Barkley	6	2011	UCLA
	Matt Barkley	6	2012	Syracuse
	Matt Barkley	6	2012	Colorado
	Cody Kessler	6	2014	Notre Dame
	Caleb Williams	6	2023	Colorado
	Miller Moss	6	2023	Louisville (Holiday Bowl)

== Defense ==
Note: The USC Football Media Guide does not generally give a full top 10 in defensive statistics.

=== Interceptions ===
Career
Rk	Player	Ints	Years
1	Artimus Parker	20	1971 1972 1973
2	Danny Reece	18	1973 1974 1975
3	Dennis Smith	16	1977 1978 1979 1980
4	Bobby Robertson	14	1939 1940 1941
5	Manuel Laraneta	13	1924 1925 1926
	Jim Hardy	13	1942 1943 1944
	Mike Battle	13	1966 1967 1968
	Bruce Dyer	13	1970 1971
	Ronnie Lott	13	1977 1978 1979 1980
	Mark Carrier	13	1987 1988 1989

Single season
Rk	Player	Ints	Year
1	Jim Psaltis	9	1952

Single game
Rk	Player	Ints	Year	Opponent
1	Adrian Young	4	1967	Notre Dame

=== Tackles ===
Career
Rk	Player	Tackles	Years
1	Keith Davis	481	1983 1984 1985 1986 1987

Single season
Rk	Player	Tackles	Year
1	Rex Moore	206	1986

Single game
Rk	Player	Tackles	Year	Opponent
1	Sam Anno	23	1986	Illinois

=== Sacks ===
Career
Rk	Player	Sacks	Years
1	Marcus Cotton	38.0	1984 1985 1986 1987
2	Lawrence Jackson	30.5	2003 2004 2005 2006
3	Nick Perry	21.5	2009 2010 2011
4	Porter Gustin	21	2015 2016 2017 2018
	Tuli Tuipulotu	21	2020 2021 2022

Single season
Rk	Player	Sacks	Year
1	Tim Ryan	20.0	1989
2	Tuli Tuipulotu	13.5	2022
3	Morgan Breslin	13	2012

Single game
Rk	Player	Sacks	Year	Opponent
1	Marcus Cotton	4.0	1987	Oregon State
	Junior Seau	4.0	1989	Oregon State
	Tim Ryan	4.0	1989	UCLA
	Lawrence Jackson	4.0	2007	Arizona State

== Special teams ==
=== Field goals made ===
Career
Rk	Player	FGs	Years
1	Quin Rodriguez	57	1987 1988 1989 1990
2	Steve Jordan	51	1981 1982 1983 1984
	Ryan Killeen	51	2002 2003 2004
4	Andre Heidari	49	2011 2012 2013 2014
5	Adam Abrams	44	1995 1996 1997 1998
6	Cole Ford	34	1991 1992 1993 1994
7	Chase McGrath	32	2017 2018 2019 2020
8	Don Shafer	28	1984 1985 1986
9	David Buehler	26	2006 2007 2008
10	Mario Danelo	26	2005 2006
	Parker Lewis	26	2020 2021

Single season
Rk	Player	FGs	Year
1	Ryon Sayeri	21	2025
2	Quin Rodriguez	19	1990
	Ryan Killeen	19	2003
4	Matt Boermeester	18	2016
5	Steve Jordan	17	1984
	Parker Lewis	17	2021
7	Don Shafer	16	1985
	Adam Abrams	16	1998
	Ryan Killeen	16	2002
	Ryan Killeen	16	2004
	David Buehler	16	2007

Single game
Rk	Player	FGs	Year	Opponent
1	Ryan Killeen	5	2004	UCLA

=== Field goal percentage ===
Career
Rk	Player	FG%	Years
1	Mario Danelo	92.9%	2005 2006
2	Ryon Sayeri	84.0%	2025
3	David Buehler	78.8%	2006 2007 2008
4	Chase McGrath	76.2%	2017 2018 2019 2020
	David Davis	76.2%	2001 2002
6	Quin Rodriguez	75.0%	1987 1988 1989 1990
7	Jordan Congdon	75.0%	2008 2009
8	Parker Lewis	74.3%	2020 2021
9	Andre Heidari	74.2%	2011 2012 2013 2014
10	Ryan Killeen	70.8%	2002 2003 2004

Single season
Rk	Player	FG%	Year
1	Mario Danelo	93.8%	2006
2	Mario Danelo	91.7%	2005
3	Adam Abrams	90.9%	1997
4	Andre Heidari	88.2%	2011
5	David Buehler	84.2%	2007
6	Ryon Sayeri	84.0%	2025
7	David Davis	83.3%	2001
8	Chase McGrath	82.4%	2019
9	Andre Heidari	81.8%	2014
10	Quin Rodriguez	79.2%	1990
	Ryan Killeen	79.2%	2003
