= 2011 USC Trojans football team =

American college football season

2011 USC Trojans football
- Conference: Pac-12 Conference
- South Division

Ranking
- AP: No. 6
- Record: 10–2 (7–2 Pac-12)
- Head coach: Lane Kiffin (2nd season)
- Offensive coordinator: Kennedy Polamalu (2nd season)
- Offensive scheme: West Coast
- Defensive coordinator: Ed Orgeron (2nd season)
- Base defense: 4–3
- Captains: Matt Barkley; Rhett Ellison; TJ McDonald; Christian Tupou
- Home stadium: Los Angeles Memorial Coliseum

2011 Pac-12 Conference football standings
| | Conf. | | | Overall |
| Team | W | | L | W | | L |
|---|---|---|---|---|---|---|
North Division
| No. 4 Oregon xy$ | 8 | – | 1 | 12 | – | 2 |
| No. 7 Stanford x% | 8 | – | 1 | 11 | – | 2 |
| Washington | 5 | – | 4 | 7 | – | 6 |
| California | 4 | – | 5 | 7 | – | 6 |
| Oregon State | 3 | – | 6 | 3 | – | 9 |
| Washington State | 2 | – | 7 | 4 | – | 8 |
South Division
| No. 6 USC † | 7 | – | 2 | 10 | – | 2 |
| UCLA xy | 5 | – | 4 | 6 | – | 8 |
| Utah | 4 | – | 5 | 8 | – | 5 |
| Arizona State | 4 | – | 5 | 6 | – | 7 |
| Arizona | 2 | – | 7 | 4 | – | 8 |
| Colorado | 2 | – | 7 | 3 | – | 10 |
Championship: Oregon 49, UCLA 31
$ – BCS representative as conference champion; % – BCS at-large representative; x – Division champion/co-champions; y – Championship game participant; † – USC ineligible for championship and postseason due to NCAA sanctions; Rankings from AP Poll

The 2011 USC Trojans football team represented the University of Southern California in the 2011 NCAA Division I FBS college football season. The Trojans were led by head coach Lane Kiffin in his second season. They played their home games at the Los Angeles Memorial Coliseum and are members of the South Division of the Pac-12 Conference. After a triple-overtime loss to Stanford, the Trojans won their last four games, including a 50–0 win over rival UCLA in the regular-season finale. USC ended their season ranked No. 6 in the AP Poll with a 10–2 record overall and finished first in the South Division with a 7–2 record in Pac-12 play. However, as part of a post-season ban mandated by the NCAA, the Trojans could not participate in the conference championship game or play in a bowl game. USC concluded their season with two thousand-yard receivers (Robert Woods and Marqise Lee), a thousand-yard rusher (Curtis McNeal), and a 3,000-yard passer (Matt Barkley) for the first time since the 2005 season, when Kiffin served as offensive coordinator.

== Coaching staff ==
| Name | Position | Seasons at USC | Alma mater |
|---|---|---|---|
| Lane Kiffin | Head coach | 2 | Fresno State (1996) |
| Monte Kiffin | Assistant head coach | 2 | Nebraska (1963) |
| Joe Barry | Linebackers | 2 | USC (1994) |
| John Baxter | Associate head coach, special teams | 2 | Loras (1985) |
| James Cregg | Offensive line | 2 | Colorado State (1995) |
| Ted Gilmore | Wide receivers | 1 | Wyoming (1989) |
| Clay Helton | Quarterbacks | 1 | Houston (1994) |
| Sammy Knight | Defensive backs coach | 2 | USC (1997) |
| Justin Mesa | Tight ends | 2 | USC (2006) |
| Ed Orgeron | Defensive coordinator, recruiting coordinator, defensive line | 2 | Northwestern State (1984) |
| Kennedy Polamalu | Offensive coordinator, running backs | 2 | USC (1985) |
| Aaron Ausmus | Strength and conditioning | 2 | Tennessee (1998) |

== Schedule ==
| Date | Time | Opponent | Rank | Site | TV | Result | Attendance |
|---|---|---|---|---|---|---|---|
| September 3 | 12:30 p.m. | Minnesota* | No. 25 | Los Angeles Memorial Coliseum; Los Angeles, CA | ABC/ESPN2 | W 19–17 | 68,273 |
| September 10 | 4:30 p.m. | Utah | | Los Angeles Memorial Coliseum; Los Angeles, CA | Versus | W 23–14 | 73,821 |
| September 17 | 5:00 p.m. | Syracuse* | | Los Angeles Memorial Coliseum; Los Angeles, CA | FX | W 38–17 | 65,873 |
| September 24 | 7:15 p.m. | at Arizona State | No. 23 | Sun Devil Stadium; Tempe, AZ | ESPN | L 22–43 | 61,495 |
| October 1 | 12:30 p.m. | Arizona | | Los Angeles Memorial Coliseum; Los Angeles, CA | FSN | W 48–41 | 63,707 |
| October 13 | 6:00 p.m. | at California | | AT&T Park; San Francisco, CA | ESPN | W 30–9 | 44,043 |
| October 22 | 4:30 p.m. | at Notre Dame* | | Notre Dame Stadium; Notre Dame, IN (Jeweled Shillelagh) | NBC | W 31–17 | 80,795 |
| October 29 | 5:00 p.m. | No. 4 Stanford | No. 20 | Los Angeles Memorial Coliseum; Los Angeles, CA (rivalry) (College GameDay) | ABC/ESPN3 | L 48–56 ^{3OT} | 93,607 |
| November 4 | 6:00 p.m. | at Colorado | No. 21 | Folsom Field; Boulder, CO | ESPN | W 42–17 | 50,083 |
| November 12 | 12:45 p.m. | Washington^{†} | No. 18 | Los Angeles Memorial Coliseum; Los Angeles, CA | FX | W 40–17 | 64,756 |
| November 19 | 5:00 p.m. | at No. 4 Oregon | No. 18 | Autzen Stadium; Eugene, OR | ABC/ESPN3 | W 38–35 | 59,933 |
| November 26 | 7:00 p.m. | UCLA | No. 10 | Los Angeles Memorial Coliseum; Los Angeles, CA (Victory Bell) | FSN | W 50–0 | 93,607 |
*Non-conference game; ^{†}Homecoming; Rankings from AP Poll released prior to the game; All times are in Pacific time

== Game summaries ==
=== Minnesota ===
Minnesota at #25 USC

| Team | 1 | 2 | 3 | 4 | Total |
|---|---|---|---|---|---|
| Minnesota | 0 | 3 | 7 | 7 | 17 |
| • USC | 6 | 13 | 0 | 0 | 19 |

- Date: September 3
- Location: Los Angeles Memorial Coliseum, Los Angeles
- Game start: 12:30 p.m. PDT
- TV announcers (ABC/ESPN2): Carter Blackburn (Play-by-play), Brock Huard (Color) & Shelley Smith (Sideline)

Scoring summary
| 1 | 5:52 | USC | Robert Woods 7-yard pass from Matt Barkley (run failed) | USC 6–0 |
| 2 | 9:25 | USC | Robert Woods 43-yard pass from Matt Barkley (pass failed) | USC 12–0 |
| 2 | 4:07 | MINN | Chris Hawthorne 21-yard field goal | USC 12–3 |
| 2 | 0:49 | USC | Robert Woods 2-yard pass from Matt Barkley (Andre Heidari kick) | USC 19–3 |
| 3 | 9:37 | MINN | Duane Bennett 9-yard run (Chris Hawthorne kick) | USC 19–10 |
| 4 | 8:03 | MINN | Brandon Green 12-yard pass from Max Shortell (Chris Hawthorne kick) | USC 19–17 |

Robert Woods caught 17 passes – the most ever for a USC player – gained 177 yards, and had 3 touchdowns as USC defeated Minnesota 19–17 on September 3. Quarterback Matt Barkley also set a USC record by completing 34 passes during the game; Barkley had 45 attempts and finished with 304 yards passing. Despite those offensive records, Minnesota nearly completed a second half comeback. After trailing 19–3 at the half, Minnesota kept the Trojans scoreless in the second half. The Golden Gophers narrowed USC's lead to 2 points with 8:03 left in the game when their backup quarterback, Max Shortell, passed the ball to Brandon Green for a touchdown. Minnesota prevented USC from scoring on the ensuing possession. On their final possession, Minnesota started their drive at their own 9-yard line with 2:04 left to play. Cornerback Torin Harris intercepted a pass by Shortell to end the threat and preserve the win for USC.

After the game, the Pac-12 Conference named Woods as its offensive player of the week. In addition to his record-breaking 17 receptions, Woods returned three kickoffs for 73 yards.

=== Utah ===
| Team | 1 | 2 | 3 | 4 | Total |
|---|---|---|---|---|---|
| Utah | 0 | 7 | 7 | 0 | 14 |
| • USC | 10 | 0 | 7 | 6 | 23 |

- Date: September 10
- Location: Los Angeles Memorial Coliseum, Los Angeles
- Game start: 4:30 p.m. PDT
- TV announcers (Versus): Ted Robinson (Play-by-play), Glenn Parker (Color) & Akbar Gbaja-Biamila (Sideline)

Scoring summary
| 1 | 4:41 | USC | Andre Heidari 47-yard field goal | USC 3–0 |
| 1 | 1:58 | USC | Marc Tyler 6-yard run (Andre Heidari kick) | USC 10–0 |
| 2 | 0:34 | UTAH | DeVonte Christopher 10-yard pass from Jordan Wynn (Coleman Petersen kick) | USC 10–7 |
| 3 | 9:52 | USC | Xavier Grimble 9-yard pass from Matt Barkley (Andre Heidari kick) | USC 17–7 |
| 3 | 6:20 | UTAH | John White IV 1-yard run (Coleman Petersen kick) | USC 17–14 |
| 4 | 0:00 | USC | Torin Harris 68-yard blocked field goal return (no kick) | USC 23–14 |

The contest between USC and Utah, the first between the two teams since Utah's win in the 2001 Las Vegas Bowl, was the first conference game in the history of the new Pac-12. A game between California and Colorado was scheduled earlier in the day, but since the game was scheduled as a non-conference game years ahead of time, it did not count as a conference game in the official standings.

The Trojans pulled ahead in the first quarter 10 to zero, but Utah scored two touchdowns off of USC turnovers to close the gap to 17–14. The fourth quarter remained scoreless until the final seconds, when the Utes lined up for a 41-yard field goal to tie. The kick was blocked by Matt Kalil and recovered by Torin Harris, who returned it for a touchdown. The USC sideline rushed the field, which netted the team an unsportsmanlike conduct penalty. Though such penalties are dead-ball fouls and are assessed on the following play, the officials erroneously negated the touchdown and the final score was initially reported as 17–14.

Two hours after the game ended, Pac-12 officials corrected the score to 23–14. The correction was particularly significant for gambling, as the nine-point victory allowed the Trojans to narrowly edge the 8.5 point spread. Some bettors were able to cash in on either score, while some were limited to the original score, depending on casino house rules.

=== Syracuse ===
| Team | 1 | 2 | 3 | 4 | Total |
|---|---|---|---|---|---|
| Syracuse | 3 | 0 | 7 | 7 | 17 |
| • USC | 7 | 10 | 14 | 7 | 38 |

- Date: September 17
- Location: Los Angeles Memorial Coliseum, Los Angeles
- Game start: 5:00 p.m. PDT
- TV announcers (FX): Gus Johnson (Play-by-play), Charles Davis (Color) & Tim Brewster (Sideline)

Scoring summary
| 1 | 8:16 | SYR | Ross Krautman 23-yard field goal | SYR 3–0 |
| 1 | 3:25 | USC | Rhett Ellison 5-yard pass from Matt Barkley (Andre Heidari kick) | USC 7–3 |
| 2 | 7:33 | USC | Robert Woods 31-yard pass from Matt Barkley (Andre Heidari kick) | USC 14–3 |
| 2 | 1:34 | USC | Andre Heidari 26-yard field goal | USC 17–3 |
| 3 | 12:58 | USC | Randall Telfer 44-yard pass from Matt Barkley (Andre Heidari kick) | USC 24–3 |
| 3 | 10:43 | SYR | Van Chew 28-yard pass from Alec Lemon (Ross Krautman kick) | USC 24–10 |
| 3 | 2:54 | USC | Marqise Lee 43-yard pass from Matt Barkley (Andre Heidari kick) | USC 31–10 |
| 4 | 11:51 | USC | Xavier Grimble 9-yard pass from Matt Barkley (Andre Heidari kick) | USC 38–10 |
| 4 | 6:34 | SYR | Alec Lemon 12-yard pass from Ryan Nassib (Ross Krautman kick) | USC 38–17 |

=== Arizona State ===
| Team | 1 | 2 | 3 | 4 | Total |
|---|---|---|---|---|---|
| USC | 3 | 6 | 13 | 0 | 22 |
| • Arizona State | 7 | 14 | 7 | 15 | 43 |

- Date: September 24
- Location: Sun Devil Stadium, Tempe, Arizona
- Game start: 7:15 p.m. MST
- TV announcers (ESPN): Joe Tessitore (Play-by-play), Rod Gilmore (Color) & Shelley Smith (Sideline)

USC had won the last 11 meetings, with Arizona State last defeating USC in 1999. In this game, USC led 22–21 in the third quarter, but Arizona State then scored 22 unanswered points to win 43–22.

=== Arizona ===
| Team | 1 | 2 | 3 | 4 | Total |
|---|---|---|---|---|---|
| Arizona | 0 | 12 | 15 | 14 | 41 |
| • USC | 17 | 10 | 7 | 14 | 48 |

- Date: October 1
- Location: Los Angeles Memorial Coliseum, Los Angeles
- Game start: 12:30 p.m. PDT
- TV announcers (FSN): Craig Bolerjack (Play-by-play), Joel Klatt (Color) & Petros Papadakis (Sideline)

Scoring summary
| 1 | 10:49 | USC | Robert Woods 82-yard pass from Matt Barkley (Andre Heidari kick) | USC 7–0 |
| 1 | 3:58 | USC | Andre Heidari 46-yard field goal | USC 10–0 |
| 1 | 0:40 | USC | Marqise Lee 38-yard pass from Matt Barkley (Andre Heidari kick) | USC 17–0 |
| 2 | 10:53 | ARIZ | Taimi Tutogi 4-yard pass from Nick Foles (kick failed) | USC 17–6 |
| 2 | 5:45 | USC | Xavier Grimble 7-yard pass from Matt Barkley (Andre Heidari kick) | USC 24–6 |
| 2 | 4:05 | ARIZ | Ka'Deem Carey 27-yard pass from Nick Foles (kick blocked) | USC 24–12 |
| 2 | 0:00 | USC | Andre Heidari 31-yard field goal | USC 27–12 |
| 3 | 12:57 | USC | Robert Woods 28-yard pass from Matt Barkley (Andre Heidari kick) | USC 34–12 |
| 3 | 4:22 | ARIZ | Ka'Deem Carey 1-yard run (Nick Foles to Austin Hill pass) | USC 34–20 |
| 3 | 0:52 | ARIZ | Ka'Deem Carey 16-yard run (Alex Zendejas kick) | USC 34–27 |
| 4 | 14:39 | USC | Matt Barkley 1-yard run (Andre Heidari kick) | USC 41–27 |
| 4 | 11:09 | ARIZ | Juron Criner 12-yard pass from Nick Foles (Alex Zendejas kick) | USC 41–34 |
| 4 | 9:28 | USC | Curtis McNeal 9-yard run (Andre Heidari kick) | USC 48–34 |
| 4 | 1:00 | ARIZ | Austin Hill 4-yard pass from Nick Foles (Alex Zendejas kick) | USC 48–41 |

=== California ===
| Team | 1 | 2 | 3 | 4 | Total |
|---|---|---|---|---|---|
| • USC | 3 | 17 | 3 | 7 | 30 |
| California | 0 | 0 | 9 | 0 | 9 |

- Date: October 13
- Location: AT&T Park, San Francisco
- Game start: 6:00 p.m. PDT
- TV announcers (ESPN): Rece Davis (Play-by-play), Craig James (Color), Jesse Palmer (Color) & Jenn Brown (Sideline)

Scoring summary
| 1 | 6:01 | USC | Andre Heidari 39-yard field goal | USC 3–0 |
| 2 | 7:36 | USC | Marqise Lee 39-yard pass from Matt Barkley (Andre Heidari kick) | USC 10–0 |
| 2 | 5:13 | USC | Andre Heidari 29-yard field goal | USC 13–0 |
| 2 | 2:46 | USC | Brandon Carswell 7-yard pass from Matt Barkley (Andre Heidari kick) | USC 20–0 |
| 3 | 8:04 | USC | Andre Heidari 23-yard field goal | USC 23–0 |
| 3 | 4:07 | CAL | Giorgio Tavecchio 27-yard field goal | USC 23–3 |
| 3 | 0:06 | CAL | Zach Maynard 3-yard run (kick blocked) | USC 23–9 |
| 4 | 5:14 | USC | Curtis McNeal 2-yard run (Andre Heidari kick) | USC 30–9 |

USC pulled out to a 20–0 halftime lead over the Golden Bears. Matt Barkley threw two touchdowns in the first half, to Brandon Carswell and Marqise Lee. USC tested out the No. 1 national wide receiver recruit George Farmer at running back. He gained 4 yards on 4 carries and caught 1 pass for 14 yards in the game. In the second half, Cal quarterback Zach Maynard, who struggled in the first half, heated up a little bit. He ran for a 3-yard touchdown, but it was not nearly close enough to outscore the Trojans. USC won by a final score of 30–9. Barkley finished with 195 yards and 2 touchdowns, Curtis McNeal lit up the Golden Bears defense for 86 yards and a touchdown, Lee caught 4 passes for 81 yards and a touchdown. USC star receiver Robert Woods only finished with 36 yards.

=== Notre Dame ===
USC at Notre Dame

| Team | 1 | 2 | 3 | 4 | Total |
|---|---|---|---|---|---|
| • USC | 14 | 3 | 7 | 7 | 31 |
| Notre Dame | 0 | 10 | 0 | 7 | 17 |

- Date: October 22
- Location: Notre Dame Stadium, Notre Dame, Indiana
- Game start: 7:30 p.m. EDT
- TV announcers (NBC): Tom Hammond (Play-by-play), Mike Mayock (Color) & Alex Flanagan (Sideline)

Scoring summary
| 1 | 6:16 | USC | Randall Telfer 2-yard pass from Matt Barkley (Andre Heidari kick) | USC 7–0 |
| 1 | 1:01 | USC | Robert Woods 3-yard pass from Matt Barkley (Andre Heidari kick) | USC 14–0 |
| 2 | 3:34 | USC | Andre Heidari 25-yard field goal | USC 17–0 |
| 2 | 3:22 | ND | George Atkinson III 96-yard kickoff return (David Ruffer kick) | USC 17–7 |
| 2 | 0:21 | ND | David Ruffer 25-yard field goal | USC 17–10 |
| 3 | 0:53 | USC | Jawanza Starling 80-yard fumble return (Andre Heidari kick) | USC 24–10 |
| 4 | 14:07 | ND | Jonas Gray 25-yard run (David Ruffer kick) | USC 24–17 |
| 4 | 7:47 | USC | Robert Woods 14-yard pass from Matt Barkley (Andre Heidari kick) | USC 31–17 |

=== Stanford ===
| Team | 1 | 2 | 3 | 4 | OT | 2OT | 3OT | Total |
|---|---|---|---|---|---|---|---|---|
| • Stanford | 7 | 3 | 14 | 10 | 7 | 7 | 8 | 56 |
| USC | 3 | 3 | 14 | 14 | 7 | 7 | 0 | 48 |

- Date: October 29
- Location: Los Angeles Memorial Coliseum, Los Angeles
- Game start: 5:00 p.m. PDT
- TV announcers (ABC/ESPN3): Brent Musburger (Play-by-play), Kirk Herbstreit (Color) & Erin Andrews (Sideline)

=== Colorado ===
#21 USC at Colorado

| Team | 1 | 2 | 3 | 4 | Total |
|---|---|---|---|---|---|
| • USC | 7 | 21 | 7 | 7 | 42 |
| Colorado | 7 | 3 | 0 | 7 | 17 |

- Date: November 4
- Location: Folsom Field, Boulder, Colorado
- Game start: 7:00 p.m. MDT
- TV announcers (ESPN): Dave LaMont (Play-by-play) & Rod Gilmore (Color)

Scoring summary
| 1 | 12:00 | COL | Toney Clemons 37-yard pass from Tyler Hansen (Will Oliver kick) | COL 7–0 |
| 1 | 9:26 | USC | Marqise Lee 33-yard pass from Matt Barkley (Andre Heidari kick) | Tied 7–7 |
| 2 | 14:51 | USC | Xavier Grimble 5-yard pass from Matt Barkley (Andre Heidari kick) | USC 14–7 |
| 2 | 7:02 | USC | Robert Woods 15-yard pass from Matt Barkley (Andre Heidari kick) | USC 21–7 |
| 2 | 1:47 | USC | Marqise Lee 25-yard pass from Matt Barkley (Andre Heidari kick) | USC 28–7 |
| 2 | 0:01 | COL | Will Oliver 30-yard field goal | USC 28–10 |
| 3 | 2:23 | USC | Robert Woods 45-yard pass from Matt Barkley (Andre Heidari kick) | USC 35–10 |
| 4 | 11:19 | COL | Toney Clemons 10-yard pass from Tyler Hansen (Will Oliver kick) | USC 35–17 |
| 4 | 7:06 | USC | Amir Carlisle 19-yard pass from Matt Barkley (Andre Heidari kick) | USC 42–17 |

Colorado jumped off to a surprising lead after a Toney Clemons 37-yard touchdown pass from Tyler Hansen. USC then scored 28 unanswered points in the 1st half. Matt Barkley threw all 4 touchdowns in the first half. Two were to freshman wide receiver Marqise Lee (33 and 25 yards), one to freshman tight end Xavier Grimble (5 yards), and one to sophomore superstar Robert Woods (15 yards). Colorado kicker Will Oliver added a 30-yard field goal right before the half. At halftime, USC led 28–10. In the third, Barkley hit Woods again for a 45-yard bomb that put the Trojans up 35–10. Clemons and Hansen connected again in the 4th quarter, followed by a 19-yard screen pass to USC freshman running back Amir Carlisle that sealed the win for the Trojans. Barkley broke the all-time USC record in this game for most touchdown passes in a single game with 6. He finished 25/39 with 318 yards, 6 touchdowns, and 1 INT. USC running backs Curtis McNeal and Carlisle picked up the slack with normal tailback Marc Tyler out. Both had 10 carries, with McNeal picking up 90 yards and Carlisle getting 86. Woods and Lee were amazing though with 9 catches and 2 touchdowns each! Woods finished with 130 yards, while Lee tallied 124 yards. USC climbed to a 7–2 record, with a 4–2 record in the Pac-12. Colorado still has not picked up a conference win as they fell to 1–9 (0–6).

=== Washington ===
| Team | 1 | 2 | 3 | 4 | Total |
|---|---|---|---|---|---|
| Washington | 0 | 3 | 7 | 7 | 17 |
| • USC | 7 | 16 | 14 | 3 | 40 |

- Date: November 12
- Location: Los Angeles Memorial Coliseum, Los Angeles
- Game start: 12:45 p.m. PST
- TV announcers (FX): Gus Johnson (Play-by-play), Charles Davis (Color) & Tim Brewster (Sideline)

Scoring summary
| 1 | 5:40 | USC | Matt Barkley 1-yard run (Andre Heidari kick) | USC 7–0 |
| 2 | 12:54 | WASH | Erik Folk 46-yard field goal | USC 7–3 |
| 2 | 6:58 | USC | Marc Tyler 1-yard run (Andre Heidari kick) | USC 14–3 |
| 2 | 5:53 | USC | Safety, Keith Price tackled by Devon Kennard in end zone | USC 16–3 |
| 2 | 2:44 | USC | Marqise Lee 9-yard pass from Matt Barkley (Andre Heidari kick) | USC 23–3 |
| 3 | 14:45 | USC | Marqise Lee 88-yard kickoff return (Andre Heidari kick) | USC 30–3 |
| 3 | 13:36 | WASH | Chris Polk 1-yard run (Erik Folk kick) | USC 30–10 |
| 3 | 12:45 | USC | Curtis McNeal 79-yard run (Andre Heidari kick) | USC 37–10 |
| 4 | 14:57 | USC | Andre Heidari 30-yard field goal | USC 40–10 |
| 4 | 0:13 | WASH | Kasen Williams 20-yard pass from Nick Montana (Erik Folk kick) | USC 40–17 |

After Southern California lost to Washington on last-gasp field goals in each of the last two years, the Trojans made sure the final seconds of the latest meeting did not matter at all. Marqise Lee caught a touchdown pass and returned the second-half kickoff 88 yards for a score, and Curtis McNeal had a 79-yard touchdown sprint among his career-high 148 yards rushing in USC's 40–17 victory over Washington. Matt Barkley passed for 174 yards and one touchdown while running for an early score for the Trojans, who made sure Huskies kicker Erik Folk played no significant role, as he did in each of Washington coach Steve Sarkisian's first two meetings with his former employer.

=== Oregon ===
This was the Trojans first win in the state of Oregon since the 2005 season.

USC at Oregon

| Team | 1 | 2 | 3 | 4 | Total |
|---|---|---|---|---|---|
| • USC | 7 | 14 | 17 | 0 | 38 |
| Oregon | 0 | 7 | 13 | 15 | 35 |

- Date: November 19
- Location: Autzen Stadium, Eugene, Oregon
- Game start: 5:00 p.m. PST
- TV announcers (ABC/ESPN3): Brent Musburger (Play-by-play), Kirk Herbstreit (Color) & Heather Cox (Sideline)

Scoring summary
| 1 | 6:35 | USC | Marqise Lee 59-yard pass from Matt Barkley (Andre Heidari kick) | USC 7–0 |
| 2 | 14:54 | USC | Robert Woods 12-yard pass from Matt Barkley (Andre Heidari kick) | USC 14–0 |
| 2 | 5:53 | ORE | De'Anthony Thomas 29-yard pass from Darron Thomas (Alejandro Maldonado kick) | USC 14–7 |
| 2 | 2:27 | USC | Robert Woods 4-yard pass from Matt Barkley (Andre Heidari kick) | USC 21–7 |
| 3 | 12:44 | USC | Andre Heidari 26-yard field goal | USC 24–7 |
| 3 | 11:34 | ORE | Kenjon Barner 9-yard run (Alejandro Maldonado kick) | USC 24–14 |
| 3 | 9:27 | USC | Marc Tyler 3-yard run (Andre Heidari kick) | USC 31–14 |
| 3 | 3:28 | USC | Randall Telfer 5-yard pass from Matt Barkley (Andre Heidari kick) | USC 38–14 |
| 3 | 3:13 | ORE | De'Anthony Thomas 96-yard kickoff return (pass failed) | USC 38–20 |
| 4 | 12:44 | ORE | Kenjon Barner 8-yard run (Alejandro Maldonado kick) | USC 38–27 |
| 4 | 7:05 | ORE | LaMichael James 1-yard run (Darron Thomas to Lavasier Tuinei pass) | USC 38–35 |

=== UCLA ===
UCLA at USC

| Team | 1 | 2 | 3 | 4 | Total |
|---|---|---|---|---|---|
| UCLA | 0 | 0 | 0 | 0 | 0 |
| • No. 10 USC | 14 | 15 | 14 | 7 | 50 |

- Date: November 26
- Location: Los Angeles Memorial Coliseum, Los Angeles
- Game start: 7:00 p.m. PST
- TV announcers (FSN): Craig Bolerjack (Play-by-play), Joel Klatt (Color) & Petros Papadakis (Sideline)

Scoring summary
| 1 | 13:15 | USC | Marqise Lee 42-yard pass from Matt Barkley (Andre Heidari kick) | USC 7–0 |
| 1 | 5:16 | USC | Curtis McNeal 73-yard run (Andre Heidari kick) | USC 14–0 |
| 2 | 12:48 | USC | Randall Telfer 1-yard pass from Matt Barkley (Matt Barkley to Xavier Grimble pass) | USC 22–0 |
| 2 | 6:53 | USC | Rhett Ellison 3-yard pass from Matt Barkley (Andre Heidari kick) | USC 29–0 |
| 3 | 10:55 | USC | Marqise Lee 52-yard pass from Matt Barkley (Andre Heidari kick) | USC 36–0 |
| 3 | 3:50 | USC | Robert Woods 4-yard pass from Matt Barkley (Andre Heidari kick) | USC 43–0 |
| 4 | 13:56 | USC | Robert Woods 41-yard pass from Matt Barkley (Andre Heidari kick) | USC 50–0 |

Matt Barkley tied his own school record by once again completing six touchdown passes and surpassed the conference record for total touchdown passes in a season with 39 total. He passed for 423 yards, completing 35 of 42 passes (83.3 percent), and no interceptions. Robert Woods set the conference's single-season receptions record while catching 12 passes for 113 yards and two touchdowns. True freshman Marqise Lee had 13 catches for 224 yards and two touchdowns. Meanwhile, Curtis McNeal rushed for 124 yards and a touchdown on 12 carries (10.3 avg) to eclipse 1,000 yards on the season. This marked the first time that USC had two thousand yard receivers, a three-thousand yard passer, and a thousand-yard rusher since 2005, when Kiffin was the offensive coordinator. The Trojans' defensive effort was led by safety T. J. McDonald, who had a game-high 10 tackles, including one for loss, a pass breakup, and an interception that he returned for 25 yards. Cornerback Nickell Robey, linebacker Hayes Pullard, and safety Jawanza Starling each had nine tackles. Robey also had two sacks and two pass breakups.

The Trojans, who finished first in the South Division, were not eligible for the post-season due to NCAA-imposed sanctions, so the Bruins were declared the South Division champions.

== Rankings ==
Ranking movement Legend: ██ Increase in ranking. ██ Decrease in ranking. ██ Not ranked the previous week.
| Poll | Pre | Wk 1 | Wk 2 | Wk 3 | Wk 4 | Wk 5 | Wk 6 | Wk 7 | Wk 8 | Wk 9 | Wk 10 | Wk 11 | Wk 12 | Wk 13 | Wk 14 | Final |
|---|---|---|---|---|---|---|---|---|---|---|---|---|---|---|---|---|
| AP | 25 | RV | RV | 23 | RV | RV | RV | RV | 20 | 21 | 18 | 18 | 10 | 9 | 5 | 6 |
| Coaches | Ineligible for ranking | | | | | | | | | | | | | | | |
| Harris | Not released | | | | | | Ineligible for ranking | | | | | | | | | |
| BCS | Not released | | | | | | | Ineligible for ranking | | | | | | | | |

== Depth chart ==
Defense

FS
T.J. McDonald
Drew McAllister
⋅

| WLB | MLB | SLB |
|---|---|---|
| ⋅ | Lamar Dawson | ⋅ |
| Tre Madden | Chris Galippo | ⋅ |
| ⋅ | ⋅ | ⋅ |

SS
Jawanza Starling
Marshall Jones
Demetrius Wright

CB
Nickell Robey
Tony Burnett
⋅

| DE | DT | DT | DE |
|---|---|---|---|
| Wes Horton | Christian Tupou | DaJohn Harris | Nick Perry |
| Devon Kennard | DaJohn Harris | George Uko | Kevin Greene |
| ⋅ | J.R. Tavai | ⋅ | ⋅ |

CB
Isiah Wiley
Tony Burnett
⋅

Offense

WR
Robert Woods
Brice Butler
De'Von Fluornoy

| LT | LG | C | RG | RT |
|---|---|---|---|---|
| Matt Kalil | Marcus Martin | Khaled Holmes | John Martinez | Kevin Graf |
| Nathan Guertler | Martin Coleman | John Martinez | Aundrey Walker | Jeremy Galten |
| ⋅ | ⋅ | ⋅ | ⋅ | ⋅ |

TE
Xavier Grimble
Randall Telfer
⋅

WR
Marqise Lee
Brandon Carswell
⋅

QB
Matt Barkley
Jesse Scroggins
⋅

RB
Curtis McNeal
Marc Tyler
DJ Morgan

FB
Rhett Ellison
Ross Cumming
Soma Vainuku

Special teams
PK Andre Heidari
PK Craig McMahon
P Kyle Negrete
P Kris Albarado
KR Robert Woods
PR Nickell Robey-Coleman
LS Chris Pousson
H Matt Barkley

== Notes ==
- May 26, 2011 – NCAA upheld all findings and penalties against USC in their infractions case on former players Reggie Bush and O. J. Mayo. The USC football team will not participate in this season's Pac-12 Football Championship Game and bowl games.
- July 18, 2011 – Running back Marc Tyler has been suspended for the season opener against Minnesota for making inappropriate comments to the media.
- October 25, 2011 – Sophomore running back Dillon Baxter is no longer a member of the football team, however he is still being supported by USC Academic Support Services.
- November 27, 2011 – Lane Kiffin announces that Dillon Baxter will no longer be a member of the football program moving forward. Baxter is expected to transfer.
- December 4, 2011 – USC is ranked No. 5 in the AP Poll despite being on NCAA probation.
