= Cyrus Hobbi =

American football player (born 1993)

No. 47
- Position: Tight end
- Class: (redshirt) Senior

Personal information
- Born: May 9, 1993 (age 33); Scottsdale, Arizona
- Listed height: 6 ft 3 in (1.91 m)
- Listed weight: 285 lb (129 kg)

Career information
- High school: Scottsdale (AZ) Saguaro
- College: USC (2011–2015)

Awards and highlights
- Parade High School All-American (2010); Super Prep High School All-American (2010); Prep Star High School All-American (2010); UnderArmour High School All-American (2010)
- Stats at ESPN

Cyrus Hobbi (born May 9, 1993) is an American college football offensive lineman. He attended the University of Southern California. Hobbi is considered one of the best center prospects of his class.

A native of Scottsdale, Arizona, Hobbi attended Saguaro High School, where he was a three-time All-Region and two-time All-State lineman. In his senior year, he helped Saguaro win the Arizona state 4A-1 title and earned All-American honors by Parade, Super Prep, and Prep Star. Regarded as a four-star recruit by Rivals.com, Hobbi was ranked as the No. 4 offensive guard prospect in his class. ESPN.com gave him an 82-point grade and ranked him the No. 1 OG prospect. He chose to attend USC over Arizona State and UCLA.

After redshirting his initial year at USC, Hobbi was a backup center and offensive guard as a redshirt freshman in 2012. He appeared in seven games (Hawaii, Syracuse, Stanford, California, Utah, Colorado, Arizona) and even started at Stanford replacing an injured Khaled Holmes.

In 2020, he started to pursue acting and starred as Klein in the horror movie Blade: The Iron Cross, which is part of the Puppet Master franchise. In 2022, he starred in the Bowling for Soup music video for "Hello Anxiety", off their album Pop Drunk Snot Bread.
