= Demetrius Wright =

American gridiron football player (born 1991)

No. 41, 34
- Position: Safety

Personal information
- Born: December 19, 1991 (age 34); Corona, California
- Listed height: 6 ft 2 in (1.88 m)
- Listed weight: 220 lb (100 kg)

Career information
- High school: Corona (CA)
- College: USC
- NFL draft: 2014: undrafted

Career history
- Miami Dolphins (2014); Winnipeg Blue Bombers (2015); Edmonton Eskimos (2016, 2018); San Diego Fleet (2019)

Awards and highlights
- U.S. Army All-American High School All-American (2010)
- Stats at CFL.ca

Demetrius Wright (born December 19, 1991) is an American former football safety. He played college football for the USC Trojans.

== Early life ==
Wright graduated in 2010 from Corona High School. As a senior defensive back and running back, he recorded 89 tackles with 1 sack, 5 deflections, 1 interception, 1 fumble recovery, and 1 forced fumble on defense. He also had 1,059 yards on 72 carries with 8 TDs and 10 receptions for 425 yards with 3 TD on offense. He was named a U.S. Army All-American Starter, a Super Prep All-American, Super Prep All-Farwest, Orange County Register Fab 15 first team, Long Beach Press-Telegram Best in the West, Tacoma News Tribune Western 100, and Riverside Press-Enterprise All-Riverside.

== College career ==
Wright played in 12 games as a true freshman in 2010 at safety with 30 tackles and played on special teams. In 2011, he was a co-starter strong safety, and will compete for a starting role against senior Jawanza Starling. Wright was listed as a co-starter with Starling on the official end-of-spring depth chart that was released on April 16, 2012. Wright had 86 tackles 4 TFL 5 PD as a senior starter 2013.

== Professional career ==
Pre-draft measurables
Height	Weight	40-yard dash	10-yard split	20-yard split	20-yard shuttle	Three-cone drill	Vertical jump	Broad jump	Bench press
6 ft 0 in (1.83 m)	203 lb (92 kg)	4.29 s	1.34 s	2.15 s	3.86 s	6.26 s	37 in (0.94 m)	10 ft 5 in (3.18 m)	23 reps
All values from USC Pro Day

Wright signed with the Miami Dolphins on May 15, 2014. He was released by the Dolphins on August 25, 2014.

He signed with the Winnipeg Blue Bombers' on February 4, 2015. He played in one game, a start, for the Blue Bombers in 2015.

Wright was signed to the Edmonton Eskimos' practice roster on August 9, 2016. He was promoted to the active roster on August 25. He played in three games, starting one, for the Eskimos in 2016.

Wright signed with the San Diego Fleet of the Alliance of American Football for the 2019 season. The league ceased operations in April 2019.

== Personal life ==
Wright's brother, Daiveun Curry-Chapman, played college football at Northern Arizona.

Wright's mother, Dr. Marilyn Y. Curry-A-Keaton MS., MA., DD. Pastoral Counselor, Social Service Practitioner and Certified Master Life Coach.
