= Aundrey Walker =

American football player (born 1993)

No. 60
- Position: Guard / Tackle

Personal information
- Born: January 15, 1993 (age 33); Cleveland, Ohio
- Listed height: 6 ft 6 in (1.98 m)
- Listed weight: 315 lb (143 kg)

Career information
- College: Southern California
- NFL draft: 2015: undrafted

Career history
- Miami Dolphins (2015)*; Winnipeg Blue Bombers (2016)*; Saskatchewan Roughriders (2016)*; Montreal Alouettes (2017)*
- * Offseason or practice squad member only

Aundrey "Rozay" Walker (born January 15, 1993) is an American former football offensive guard for the Miami Dolphins. He played college football at Southern California.
