= Morgan Breslin =

American football player

Profile
- Position: Linebacker
- Class: Senior

Personal information
- Born: Walnut Creek, California, U.S.
- Listed height: 6 ft 2 in (1.88 m)
- Listed weight: 250 lb (113 kg)

Career information
- College: Diablo Valley College (2010–2011); Southern California (2012–2013)

Awards and highlights
- Second-team All-Pac-12 (2012)

Morgan Breslin is an American former football linebacker. He played college football at USC.

== College career ==
=== Diablo Valley College ===
Breslin attended Diablo Valley College in 2010 and 2011 where he led California JUCO's in sacks and was named JUCO All-American by CCCFA. During his two years he had 28 sacks.

=== USC ===
Breslin transferred to the University of Southern California in 2012. During his first year at USC in 2012, he started all 12 games at defensive end recording 62 tackles and 13 sacks. As a senior in 2013 he moved to outside linebacker. Breslin recorded 18 sacks in 18 games during his time at USC.
