= Khaled Holmes =

American football player (born 1990)

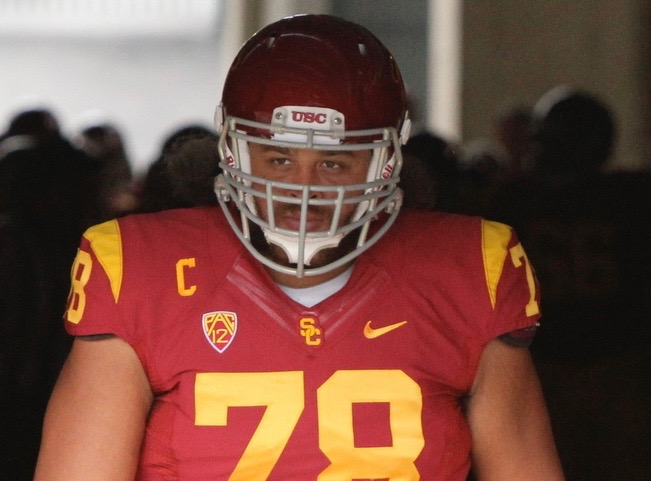
- Holmes with the USC Trojans in 2012

No. 62
- Position: Center

Personal information
- Born: January 19, 1990 (age 36); San Diego, California, U.S.
- Listed height: 6 ft 3 in (1.91 m)
- Listed weight: 302 lb (137 kg)

Career information
- High school: Mater Dei (Santa Ana, California)
- College: USC
- NFL draft: 2013: 4th round, 121st overall pick

Career history
- Indianapolis Colts (2013–2015); Chicago Bears (2016)*; New York Giants (2017)*
- * Offseason or practice squad member only

Awards and highlights
- First-team All-Pac-12 (2012); Second-team All-Pac-12 (2011)

Career NFL statistics
- Games played: 17
- Games started: 9
- Stats at Pro Football Reference

Khaled Holmes (born January 19, 1990) is an American former professional football player who was a center in the National Football League (NFL). He played college football for the USC Trojans, and was selected by the Indianapolis Colts in the fourth round of the 2013 NFL draft.

== Early life ==
Holmes was born in San Diego, California. As a senior offensive lineman at Mater Dei High School in Santa Ana, he was named a Prep Star All American. Trojan teammates Matt Barkley, Victor Blackwell and Max Wittek also prepped at Mater Dei in 2007.

== College career ==
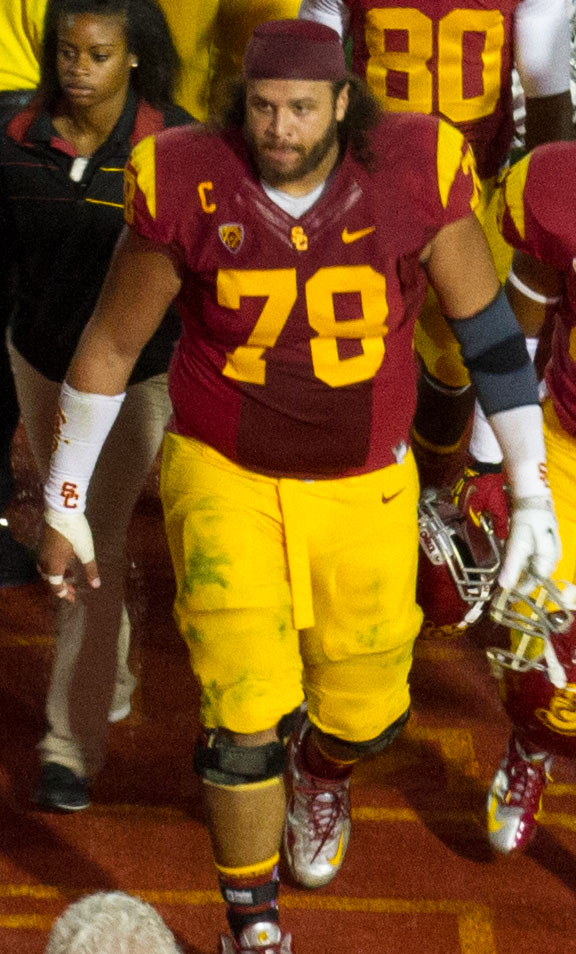
Holmes playing in his last season at USC.

Holmes enrolled in the University of Southern California, where he played for the USC Trojans football team from 2009 to 2012. He started all of 2010 at right offensive guard as a sophomore and was named a 2010 All-Pac-10 honorable mention. Holmes started for his second season on the offensive lineman as a junior in 2011, performing exceptionally well at center in 2011 after playing offensive guard in 2010. He made the 2011 All-Pac-12 second-team and the Phil Steele All-Pac-12 second-team. He was moved from guard to center in 2011 spring practice. Holmes received his bachelor's degree in classics at USC in the spring of 2011 and completed a master's degree in Communication Management the following year, 2012. He made the 2011 Pac-12 All-Academic second-team. He made 2010 Pac-10 All-Academic honorable mention. Holmes started his third season as a senior in 2012 as an Academic All-American candidate and after the regular season was named one of six finalists for the Rimington Trophy, given annually to college football's top center.

== Professional career ==
=== Pre-draft ===
Holmes was considered one of the top interior line prospects in the 2013 NFL draft.

Pre-draft measurables
Height	Weight	Arm length	Hand span	Bench press
6 ft 3 in (1.91 m)	302 lb (137 kg)	35 in (0.89 m)	10 1/4 in (0.26 m)	13 (Strained Pectoral on 13th rep) reps
All values from NFL Combine

=== Indianapolis Colts ===
On April 27, Holmes was taken in the fourth round, with the 121st overall pick, of the 2013 NFL draft by the Indianapolis Colts. He made his NFL debut in Week 15 against the Houston Texans. On May 2, 2016, Holmes was waived by the Colts.

=== Chicago Bears ===
The Chicago Bears signed Holmes on August 14, 2016. On September 3, 2016, he was released by the Bears as part of final roster cuts.

=== New York Giants ===
On January 18, 2017, Holmes signed a reserve/future contract with the Giants. He was released by the Giants on June 8, 2017.
