= Curtis McNeal =

American gridiron football player (born 1989)

No. 24, 39
- Position: Running back

Personal information
- Born: December 3, 1989 (age 36); Los Angeles, California, U.S.
- Listed height: 5 ft 7 in (1.70 m)
- Listed weight: 201 lb (91 kg)

Career information
- High school: Venice (Los Angeles)
- College: USC
- NFL draft: 2013: undrafted

Career history
- Pittsburgh Steelers (2013)*; Saskatchewan Roughriders (2014)*
- * Offseason or practice squad member only

Curtis McNeal (born December 3, 1989) is an American former football running back. McNeal signed with the Pittsburgh Steelers as an undrafted rookie free agent, after playing collegiately for the USC Trojans. He signed with the Saskatchewan Roughriders of the Canadian Football League (CFL) on May 7, 2014.

== Early life ==
McNeal was born in Los Angeles, California. He attended Venice High School in Los Angeles and graduated in 2008. As a junior in 2006, he made Cal-Hi Sports All-State Underclass second-team and All-L.A. City first-team while running for 2,008 yards with 42 touchdowns and getting 3,106 all-purpose yards. In his career, he ran for more than 4,000 yards. His 2007 honors included Super Prep All-American, Super Prep All-Farwest, Prep Star All-West, Long Beach Press-Telegram Best in the West Best of the Rest, Tacoma News Tribune Western 100, Cal-Hi Sports All-State second-team and All-L.A. He was named City Offensive MVP as a senior running back and defensive back at Venice High. As a senior, McNeal ran for 1,400 yards on 136 carries (10.3 avg.) with 19 touchdowns, added 278 receiving yards and scored touchdowns by rushing and receiving, as well as an interception and punt return.

== College career ==
In 2008 McNeal accepted an athletic scholarship to attend the University of Southern California and play for the USC Trojans football team. McNeal redshirted as a freshman tailback in 2008, his first year at USC, then saw limited action at tailback as a redshirt freshman in 2009, when he was primarily used as a returner and on special teams, and missed the 2010 season after being declared academically ineligible as a sophomore.

McNeal broke out as a junior in 2011 with 145 carries for a team-best 1,005 yards (6.9 avg.) and 6 touchdowns. McNeal came off the bench at Notre Dame in 2011 and had a game-high and then-career-best 118 yards on 24 carries (he also caught a 4-yard pass). He had a then-career-high and game-best 145 yards on 20 carries with 2 touchdowns (61 and 25 yards) off the bench against Stanford. At Colorado, he got his first career start and had 87 yards on 10 carries. Against Washington, he ran for a career-best 148 yards on 18 carries, including a 79-yard touchdown burst (USC's longest run since Reggie Bush's 81-yard touchdown run at UCLA in 2004) to earn USC's "Jack Oakie Rise and Shine Award." He had a team-best 94 yards on 20 carries at Oregon and then a game-best 124 yards on 12 carries with a 73-yard touchdown run against UCLA. He became USC's 27th 1,000-yard rusher in a season. His 6.9-yard average per carry was the best by a Trojan with at least 10 carries per game since Reggie Bush's 8.7 in 2005.

== Professional career ==
McNeal signed with the Pittsburgh Steelers after being undrafted in the 2013 NFL draft. On August 7, 2013, McNeal was waived/injured by the Steelers. On August 8, 2013, he cleared waivers and was placed on the injured reserve list. On August 16, 2013, he was waived with an injury settlement.
