= Matt Barkley =

American football player (born 1990)

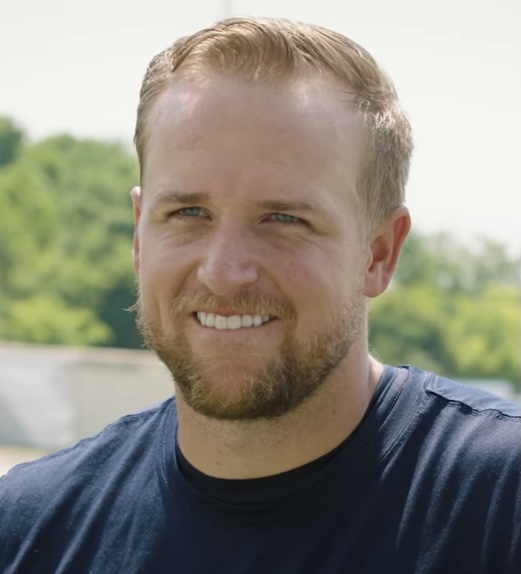
- Barkley with the Tennessee Titans in 2021

No. 2, 5, 12, 19
- Position: Quarterback

Personal information
- Born: September 8, 1990 (age 36); Newport Beach, California, U.S.
- Listed height: 6 ft 2 in (1.88 m)
- Listed weight: 227 lb (103 kg)

Career information
- High school: Mater Dei (Santa Ana, California)
- College: USC (2009–2012)
- NFL draft: 2013: 4th round, 98th overall pick

Career history
- Philadelphia Eagles (2013–2014); Arizona Cardinals (2015); Chicago Bears (2016); San Francisco 49ers (2017)*; Arizona Cardinals (2017); Cincinnati Bengals (2018); Buffalo Bills (2018–2020); Tennessee Titans (2021)*; Carolina Panthers (2021); Atlanta Falcons (2021); Buffalo Bills (2022–2023)*; New York Giants (2023); Jacksonville Jaguars (2023)
- * Offseason or practice squad member only

Awards and highlights
- Wuerffel Trophy (2012); Third-team All-American (2011); Second-team All-Pac-12 (2011)

Career NFL statistics
- Passing attempts: 363
- Passing completions: 212
- Completion percentage: 58.4%
- TD–INT: 11–22
- Passing yards: 2,699
- Passer rating: 66.6
- Stats at Pro Football Reference

Matthew Montgomery Barkley (born September 8, 1990) is an American former professional football player who was a quarterback in the National Football League (NFL). He played college football for the USC Trojans, setting the Pac-12 Conference season record for touchdown passes as a junior. Due to suffering a shoulder injury as a senior, Barkley was not selected until the fourth round of the 2013 NFL draft by the Philadelphia Eagles. He has been a member of 11 different NFL teams, mostly as a backup. Barkley had his most notable stint with the Chicago Bears in 2016 where he served as the team's starter.

== Early life ==
Barkley was born on September 8, 1990, in Newport Beach, California, and attended Mariners Christian School in Costa Mesa for middle school and later Mater Dei High School in Santa Ana. In 2005, he became the first freshman quarterback to start at Mater Dei since Todd Marinovich. As a freshman, Barkley threw for 1,685 yards and 10 touchdowns, but suffered a season-ending injury (broken collarbone) during the playoffs in a quarterfinal victory over Colton High School. The injury was caused by future University of Southern California (USC) teammate, running back Allen Bradford, who played linebacker in high school.

Barkley's high school coach, Bruce Rollinson, permitted him to call his own plays, something he had never allowed a player to do during two decades at Mater Dei. As a sophomore in 2006, Barkley threw for 1,349 yards and 11 touchdowns.

As a junior in 2007, Barkley passed for 3,576 yards, 35 touchdowns, and nine interceptions. In three seasons, Barkley passed for 6,994 yards and 57 touchdowns. He was named 2007 football Gatorade National Player of the Year, and then the 2007 Gatorade national male athlete of the year, becoming the first non-senior to win both awards. Barkley also won the 2007 Glenn Davis Award, given to the best high school football player in Southern California, and the inaugural Joe Montana Award as the nation's top high school quarterback.

Barkley was rated as the top prospect in the nation for the Class of 2009 by ESPN. He was rated the top quarterback prospect by Rivals.com. Quarterback coach Steve Clarkson described Barkley as a cross between Joe Montana and Tom Brady.

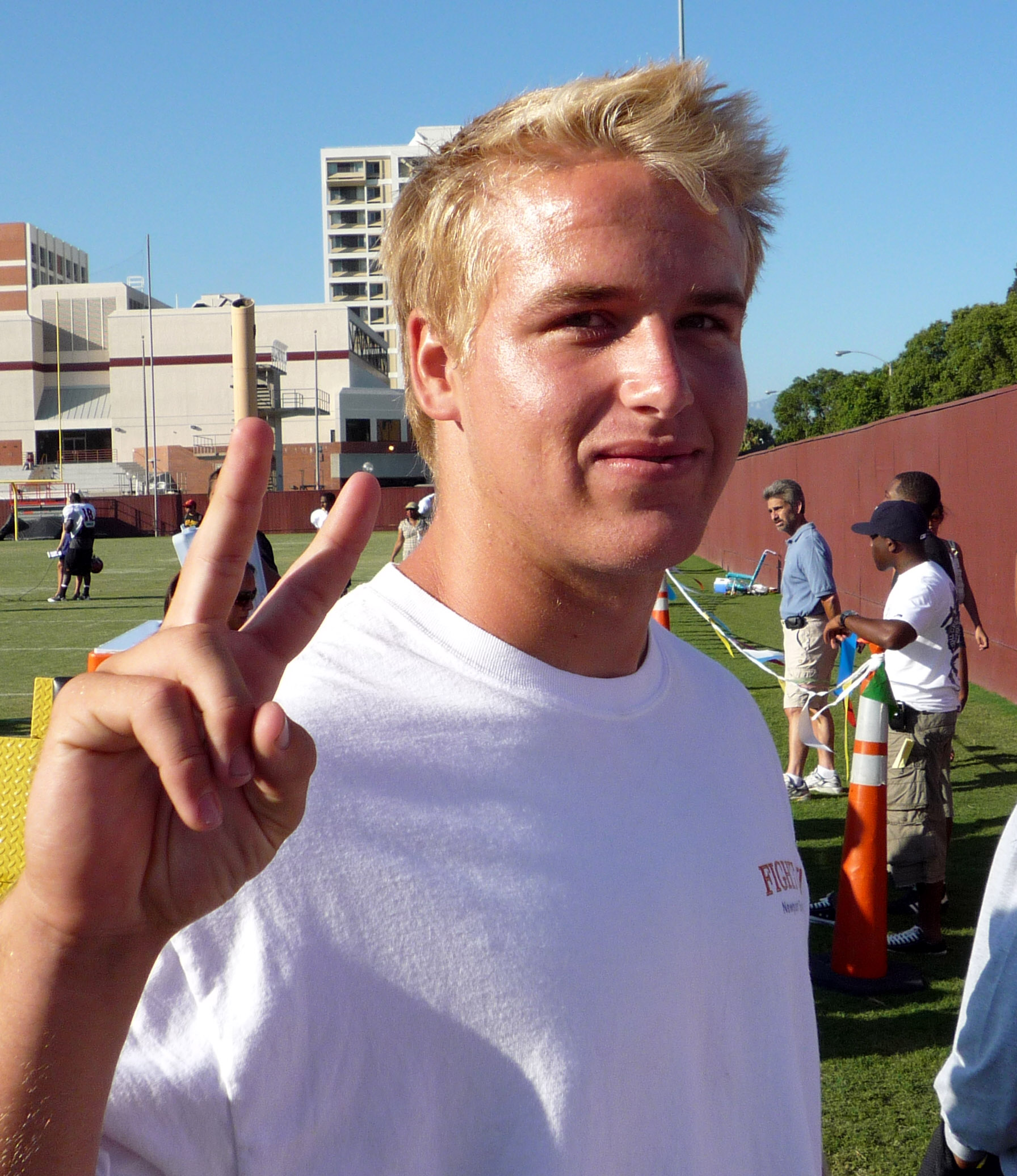
Barkley in 2008 visiting a USC practice before his senior season after he verbally committed to Trojans

As a top high school player, Barkley was heavily recruited. On January 23, 2008, Barkley verbally committed to USC, ending speculation that he might join UCLA, which had just hired coaches Rick Neuheisel and Norm Chow. Barkley's father, Les Barkley, was an All-American water polo player at USC from 1976 to 1979. He made his decision more than a year before his National Signing Day, telling his family and coaches and then calling USC coach Pete Carroll on his cell phone. The previous quarterback to go to USC from Mater Dei was Heisman Trophy-winner Matt Leinart (the school had also graduated fellow Heisman winner John Huarte). After committing to USC, Barkley began recruiting other elite high school players to join him.

Barkley's 2008 senior season started slow, throwing nearly as many interceptions as touchdown passes and the Monarchs barely keeping above .500; however, his performance turned around and Mater Dei rallied to 7–3 and entered the playoffs. The Monarchs made it to the quarterfinal, falling to Tesoro High School and ending the season 8–4. Barkley finished his Mater Dei High School career as the all-time passing yardage leader in Orange County, surpassing the record that was set by Todd Marinovich in 1987. Barkley graduated from high school on December 18, 2008.

On January 4, 2009, Barkley participated in Under Armour All-America Game at the Florida Citrus Bowl. After a strong performance, where he completed 11-of-22 passes for 237 yards and two touchdowns and led the White team to a 27–16 victory over the Black team, Barkley was named the game's co-MVP. Shortly afterward, he was moved back to the number one high school prospect in America by ESPN, having dropped to tenth during his senior season.

College recruiting
Name	Hometown	School	Height	Weight	40^{‡}	Commit date
Matt Barkley; Quarterback	Santa Ana, California	Mater Dei High School	6 ft 3 in (1.91 m)	226 lb (103 kg)	4.7	Jan 23, 2008
Matt Barkley; Quarterback	Recruit ratings: Scout: Rivals: (93)					
Overall recruit ranking: Scout: 1 (QB) Rivals: 1 (QB), 5 (National), 1 (CAL) ESPN: 1 (National), 1 (QB)
‡ Refers to 40-yard dash; Note: In many cases, Scout, Rivals, 247Sports, On3, and ESPN may conflict in their listings of height, weight and 40 time.; In these cases, the average was taken. ESPN grades are on a 100-point scale.; Sources: "2009 USC Football Commitment List". Rivals.; "2009 Team Ranking". Rivals.com.

== College career ==
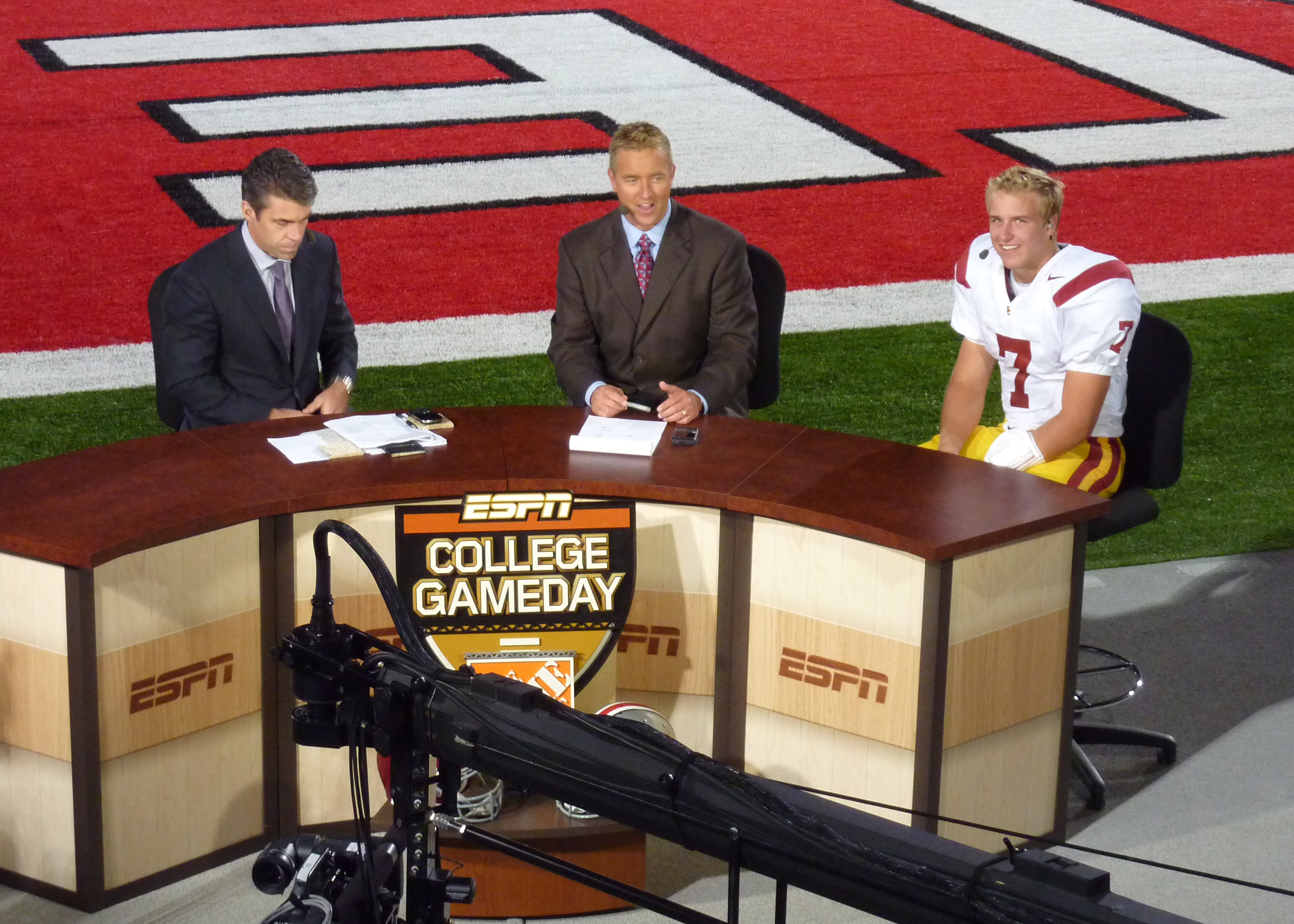
Barkley during a post-game interview with ESPN College GameDay's Chris Fowler (left) and Kirk Herbstreit (center) in Ohio Stadium

After graduating from high school a semester early, Barkley enrolled in the University of Southern California in January 2009 so he could participate in spring practice with the USC Trojans football team. He would play for the Trojans for the next four seasons, from 2009 to 2012.

=== 2009 ===
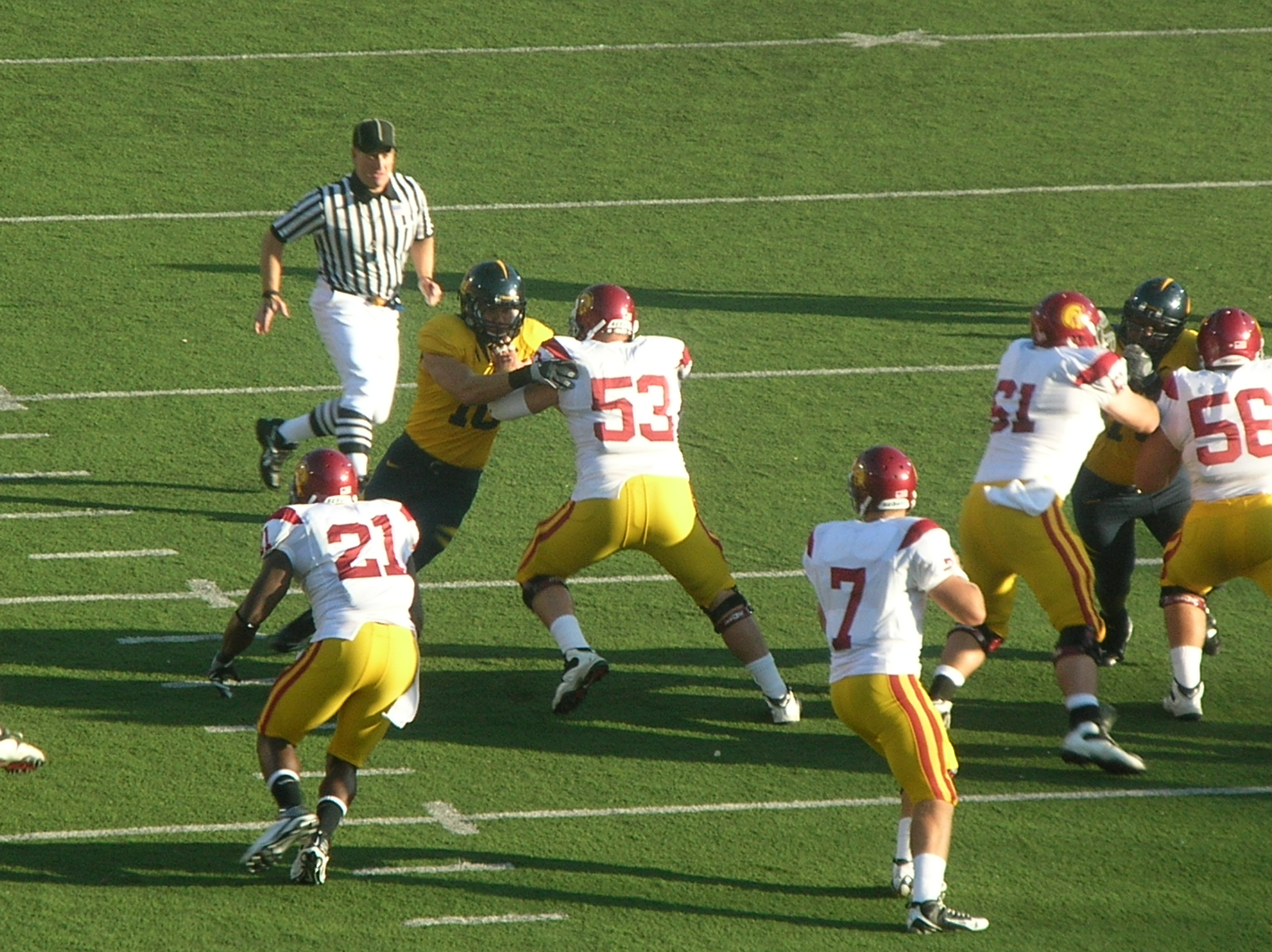
Barkley looks to pass against California in October 2009

With the early departure of the Trojans' previous starting quarterback, Mark Sanchez, for the NFL, and with no clear successor, a three-way quarterback battle emerged during spring practices between Barkley and quarterbacks Aaron Corp and Mitch Mustain, both of whom had held the second quarterback spot at various times throughout the season; the latter had been the starting quarterback at Arkansas for eight games in 2006.

Barkley adapted to the Trojans offense and gave strong performances during spring practices: trying for and making big plays but also throwing several key interceptions. Impressing his coaches, Barkley climbed to the number two spot at the end of Spring behind Corp. Afterward, ESPN NFL draft analyst Mel Kiper Jr. stated he believed that in "three years Matt Barkley—who will be a true freshman this year—will be the No. 1 pick in the draft."

On August 27, during fall practices, Carroll named Barkley the starter for the 2009 season opener against San Jose State. Barkley became the first true freshman quarterback to ever start an opener for the Trojans, and the first true freshman to start the opener for a preseason top-five team since Rick Leach did it for #3 Michigan in 1975. After a slow first quarter, Barkley finished his college debut 233 yards, throwing 15-for-19 with one touchdown in a 56–3 victory.

Barkley's second game brought his first major test and first road game, against the highly ranked Ohio State Buckeyes. Before a sold-out, raucous crowd at Ohio Stadium, Barkley led a game-winning, 86-yard drive late in the fourth quarter, earning significant praise from the sports media.

Barkley suffered a shoulder bruise in the Ohio State game, and had to sit out the following week's game at Washington. With Aaron Corp at the helm, the Trojans struggled in a major upset loss, falling to the unranked Huskies 16–13 while putting up the lowest number of passing yards for a USC team since Carroll took over the program in 2001. Carroll had Barkley, who wasn't fully recovered from his injury, start the next game against Washington State. Barkley contributed to a 27–6 victory, passing for 247 yards and two touchdowns. He followed this up with 282 passing yards in a 30–3 win over California on October 3. The next week against Notre Dame, he was 19 for 29 with two touchdowns. He followed that up with a 15–25 two touchdown game against Oregon State. Against Stanford he threw three interceptions and only one touchdown. Two weeks later he went one touchdown and one interception in a 28–7 victory over UCLA. The following week, he also, went 1–1 in a 21–17 loss to Arizona. He closed his freshman season by throwing for 350 yards and two touchdowns against Boston College in the 2009 Emerald Bowl.

=== 2010 ===
On September 2, 2010, Barkley led the Trojans to an opening week victory at Hawaii by a score of 49–36. Barkley contributed five passing touchdowns (three to wide receiver Ronald Johnson) on 17-of-23 passing for 257 yards. The win marked a successful debut for new USC head coach Lane Kiffin and the first win under USC's 2010 NCAA probation and sanctions. Both teams amassed over 500 yards of total offense. Barkley said, "I'm just trying to be as perfect as I can be. Last week was pretty close, but that perfect game is kind of a goal and that's no incompletions." Coach Kiffin added, "We'll see if he can continue to do it again. Great quarterbacks put together good games every week." Matt Barkley continued a solid sophomore campaign. With notable performances against Stanford and Cal. Barkley sprained his ankle during a loss to Oregon State and was forced to the sideline for the Notre Dame game. He returned to lead the Trojans to a gutsy 28–14 victory over UCLA.

=== 2011 ===
Barkley began 2011 by setting the USC single-game record for completions with 34 against Minnesota. On October 1, against Arizona, he threw for a USC single-game record for 468 yards. On November 4, Barkley passed for a USC single-game record for touchdowns in a game with six, against the Colorado Buffaloes, one of the two additions to the Pac-12 in its inaugural season; the game was the first against Colorado since 2002. He had previously tied the single-game touchdown record thrice, sharing it with Rodney Peete, Carson Palmer, Matt Leinart, and Mark Sanchez. On November 26, against UCLA, Barkley tied the single-game touchdown record again in a 50–0 shutout of the Bruins. On national television, he stated the best moment of the UCLA game was his pass to his cousin Robbie Boyer. Over the 2011 season, Barkley accumulated 39 touchdowns, an all-time Pac-12 record, and helped end the season with a 10–2 record. Barkley had the sixth most votes for the Heisman Trophy. He finished with a 39–7 touchdown-to-interception ratio while completing 69.1% of his passes. Barkley won the 2011 CFPA National Performer of the Year Trophy with his record-breaking season.

On December 22, 2011, at a press conference convened at Heritage Hall, Barkley announced that he would return for his senior year with the USC Trojans rather than entering the 2012 NFL draft. Barkley announced his return to USC in his own unique way by giving Coach Kiffin a homemade ornament for Christmas with a picture of them at the Colorado game, but on the back revealing the text "One more year." Barkley has described his decision to stay at University of Southern California in his senior as "unfinished business", as he wanted to be part of a team that would be aiming for the BCS championship after a two-year postseason ban.

=== 2012 ===
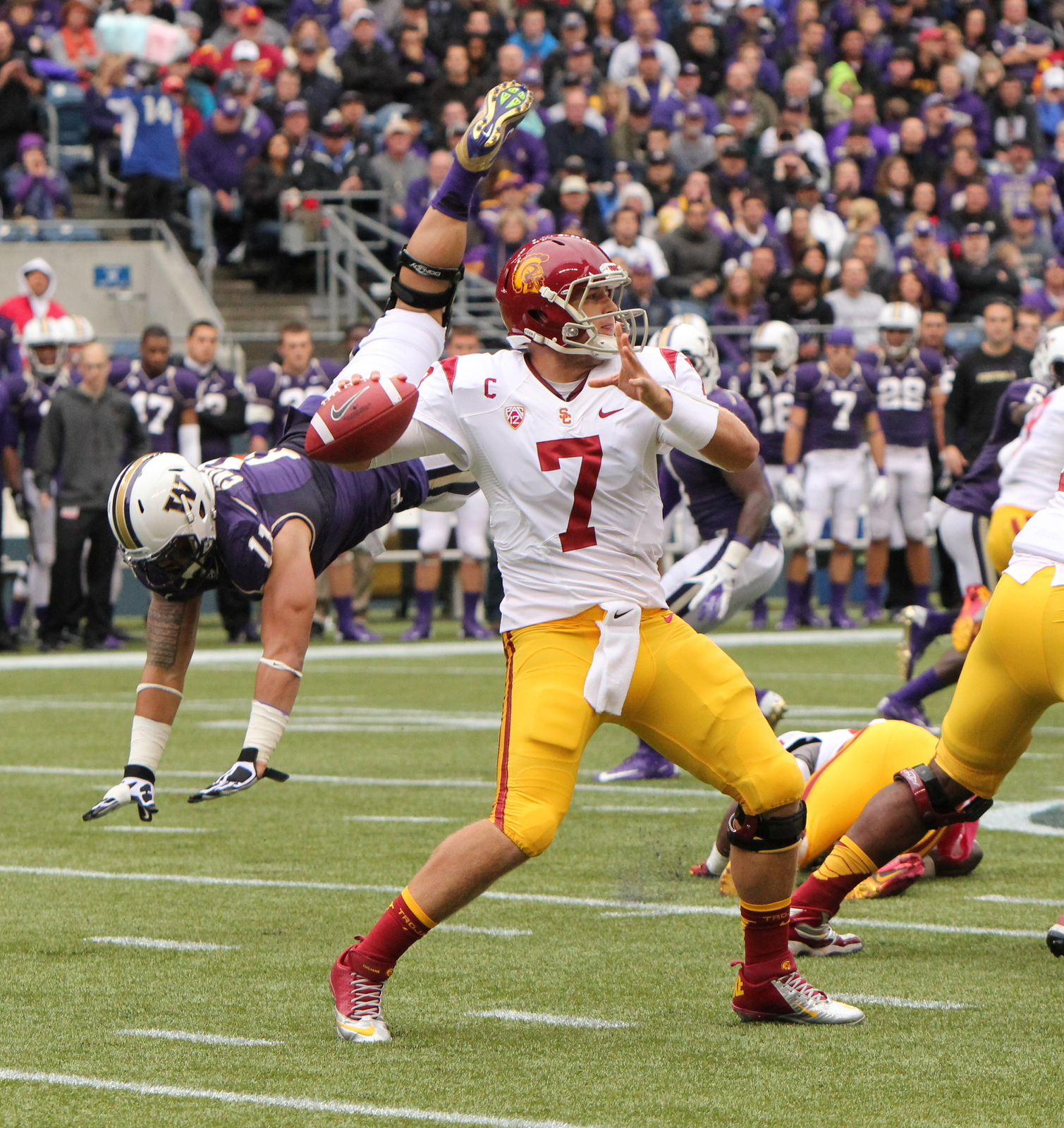
Barkley in 2012

Going into his senior season, Barkley was widely considered a favorite to win the Heisman Trophy. At the beginning of the season, USC was ranked #1 in the preseason poll, but a 21–14 loss to then-#21 Stanford ended USC's potential BCS national championship run. USC then went on to lose five games that year, including a late-season loss to rival UCLA for the first time in six years. Barkley was knocked out of that game by UCLA's Anthony Barr with a shoulder separating hit, prematurely ending his regular season. On December 27, 2012, head coach Lane Kiffin announced Barkley would not play in the Sun Bowl due to the shoulder injury, effectively ending his college football career.

== Professional career ==
=== Pre-draft ===
Despite being projected as a first-round selection for the 2012 NFL draft by midseason of 2011, Barkley decided to return to USC for his senior season. As early as April 2012, he was projected the No. 1 overall pick for the 2013 NFL draft. However, a month prior to the draft, Barkley's draft stock had fallen with ESPN draft analysts Mel Kiper Jr. and Todd McShay projecting Barkley to fall out of the first round. Due to his shoulder injury, Barkley did not throw at the NFL Scouting Combine and instead took medical tests on his shoulder.

Pre-draft measurables
Height	Weight	Arm length	Hand span	Wingspan	40-yard dash	10-yard split	20-yard split	20-yard shuttle
6 ft 2 1/2 in (1.89 m)	227 lb (103 kg)	30 5/8 in (0.78 m)	10 1/8 in (0.26 m)	6 ft 3 1/4 in (1.91 m)	4.90 s	1.75 s	2.85 s	4.58 s
All measurables from NFL Combine/Drills from USC Pro Day

=== Philadelphia Eagles ===
The Philadelphia Eagles selected Barkley in the fourth round (98th overall) of the 2013 NFL draft. Going into training camp, it was announced that he would be given a chance to compete for the starting quarterback job, facing off against the two starting quarterbacks from the previous season, Nick Foles and Michael Vick.

On October 20, 2013, Barkley saw his first NFL action against the Dallas Cowboys as he came in to relieve Foles, who left early in the fourth quarter due to a head injury. In that game, Barkley completed 11 of 20 passes for 129 yards and three interceptions. His second game came the following week in relief of Foles (concussion) and Vick (quadriceps) in the next game against the New York Giants. Barkley completed 17 of 26 passes for 158 yards and an interception to go along with recording a fumble inside their red zone during the 15–7 loss.

=== Arizona Cardinals (first stint) ===
The Eagles traded Barkley to the Arizona Cardinals for a conditional seventh-round pick in the 2016 NFL draft on September 4, 2015. The terms said that he needed to be on the roster for six games, which were fulfilled on October 17.

On September 3, 2016, Barkley was released by the Cardinals.

=== Chicago Bears ===
Barkley was signed to the Chicago Bears' practice squad on September 4, 2016. He was elevated to the active roster on September 22.

Following an injury to backup quarterback Brian Hoyer against the Green Bay Packers on October 20, Barkley made his first appearance as a member of the Bears, going 6 of 15 for 81 yards and two interceptions. After Jay Cutler suffered a shoulder injury against the Giants, Barkley started the following week's game against the Tennessee Titans. Barkley completed 28 of 54 passes for 316 yards, three touchdowns, and two interceptions for a 72.8 passer rating, nearly rallying the Bears from a 20-point deficit in the fourth quarter before losing 27–21. Barkley earned his first NFL victory in the next game against the San Francisco 49ers when the Bears won 26–6. This was their third and final victory of the season. Barkley completed 11 for 18 passes for 192 yards, no touchdowns, no interceptions, and a 97.5 passer rating.

On December 18, Barkley completed 30 passes for 362 yards, two touchdowns, and three interceptions as the Bears nearly upset the Green Bay Packers, ultimately losing 30–27 on a last-second field goal. It was the most yards by a Bears quarterback in a game against Green Bay in the rivalry's history. Barkley struggled in the next game against the Washington Redskins, a 41–21 loss; although he threw for 323 yards and two touchdowns, Barkley also threw five interceptions, including on four consecutive drives in the second half. The five interceptions were the most by a Bears quarterback since Cutler threw five in 2009. In the regular season finale, Barkley caught a touchdown from wide receiver Cameron Meredith on a trick play; while Barkley was calling at the line of scrimmage, the ball was snapped to running back Jeremy Langford, who handed it off to Meredith before throwing it to a wide-open Barkley for the touchdown. The play would later inspire the Eagles' Philly Special in Super Bowl LII.

Barkley finished the 2016 season with 1,611 passing yards, eight touchdowns, and 14 interceptions. Of his 216 pass attempts, 89 went for a first down (41.2 percent), the second-highest percentage in the NFL behind the Atlanta Falcons' Matt Ryan (44.6).

=== San Francisco 49ers ===
On March 10, 2017, Barkley signed a two-year contract with the San Francisco 49ers. On September 1, he was released by the 49ers at the end of the preseason after throwing for just 197 yards with no touchdowns or interceptions. Barkley was beaten out by veteran Brian Hoyer and rookie C. J. Beathard.

=== Arizona Cardinals (second stint) ===
On November 13, 2017, Barkley re-signed with the Cardinals due to Drew Stanton possibly missing playing time as a result of a knee sprain. However, Barkley was inactive for the entire season.

=== Cincinnati Bengals ===
On March 17, 2018, Barkley signed a two-year contract with the Cincinnati Bengals. He was placed on injured reserve on September 1 after suffering a knee injury in the preseason. Barkley was released with an injury settlement on September 12.

=== Buffalo Bills (first stint) ===
On October 31, 2018, Barkley was signed by the Buffalo Bills. On November 11, it was announced that he would start for the Bills against the New York Jets over Nathan Peterman with starter Josh Allen injured. Barkley, making his first NFL start in two years, threw for 232 yards and two touchdowns in the 41–10 road victory, snapping the team's four-game losing streak. On December 21, 2018, Barkley signed a two-year contract extension with the Bills through the 2020 season.

During Week 4 of the 2019 season, Barkley came into the game against the New England Patriots to relieve Josh Allen, who had experienced an in-game head injury. Barkley threw for 127 yards and an interception in the 16–10 loss. He made one more appearance in the regular-season finale against the New York Jets, throwing for 232 yards and two interceptions in relief of Allen during the 13–6 loss.

During the 2020 season, Barkley saw action in five regular season games and threw his first touchdown pass since the 2018 season, a 56-yard completion to wide receiver Gabe Davis, during the regular season finale against the Miami Dolphins. Barkley finished the season completing 11 of 21 passes for 197 yards, a touchdown, and an interception.

=== Tennessee Titans ===
Barkley signed a two-year contract with the Tennessee Titans on August 5, 2021. He was released on September 1, and was re-signed to the practice squad.

=== Carolina Panthers ===
On November 10, 2021, Barkley was signed by the Carolina Panthers off the Titans' practice squad. He was waived on December 28.

=== Atlanta Falcons ===
On December 29, 2021, Barkley was claimed off waivers by the Atlanta Falcons. He was waived on January 4, 2022, but was re-signed to the practice squad two days later. Barkley's contract expired when the team's season ended on January 9, 2022.

=== Buffalo Bills (second stint) ===
On March 21, 2022, the Bills signed Barkley to a one-year contract.

On August 26, 2022, in the Bills' last preseason game against the Carolina Panthers, Barkley served as the team's punter in addition to seeing substantial playing time at quarterback. He punted four times in the game, including a 53-yard punt. Barkley was released on August 30, but signed to the practice squad the next day.

Barkley signed a reserve/future contract on January 23, 2023. He was released on August 29.

=== New York Giants ===
On October 31, 2023, Barkley was signed to the New York Giants practice squad. He was signed to the active roster eight days later. Barkley was released on December 4, but was re-signed to the practice squad two days later.

=== Jacksonville Jaguars ===
On December 26, 2023, Barkley was signed to the Jacksonville Jaguars active roster off the Giants practice squad.

== Career statistics ==
Legend
**Bold**	Career high

=== NFL ===
Year	Team	Games			Passing									Rushing				
Year	Team	GP	GS	Record	Cmp	Att	Pct	Yds	Y/A	Lng	TD	Int	Rtg	Att	Yds	Y/A	Lng	TD
2013	PHI	3	0	—	30	49	**61.2**	300	6.1	26	0	4	44.6	2	−2	−1.0	−1	0
2014	PHI	1	0	—	0	1	0.0	0	0.0	0	0	0	39.6	3	0	0	0	0
2015	ARI	DNP																
2016	CHI	7	6	1–5	**129**	**216**	59.7	**1,611**	7.5	37	**8**	**14**	68.3	**7**	**2**	**0.3**	**5**	0
2017	ARI	DNP																
2018	CIN	DNP																
2018	BUF	1	1	**1–0**	15	25	60.0	232	9.3	47	2	0	**117.4**	3	−2	−0.7	0	0
2019	BUF	2	0	—	27	51	52.9	359	7.0	41	0	3	51.0	2	−4	−2.0	0	0
2020	BUF	5	0	—	11	21	52.4	197	**9.4**	**56**	1	1	80.9	6	−6	−1.0	−1	0
2023	JAX	1	0	—	0	0	0.0	0	0.0	0	0	0	0.0	3	−3	−1.0	−1	0
Career		20	7	2–5	212	363	58.4	2,699	7.4	56	11	22	66.6	26	−15	−0.6	5	0

=== College ===
Season	Team	Passing							Rushing			
Season	Team	Cmp	Att	Yds	Pct	TD	Int	Rtg	Att	Yds	Avg	TD
2009	USC	211	352	2,735	59.9	15	14	131.3	**45**	−38	−0.8	**2**
2010	USC	236	377	2,791	62.6	26	12	141.2	34	−17	−0.5	**2**
2011	USC	**308**	**446**	**3,528**	**69.1**	**39**	7	**161.2**	28	**14**	**0.5**	**2**
2012	USC	246	387	3,273	63.6	36	**15**	157.6	25	−72	−2.9	0
Career		1,001	1,562	12,327	63.8	116	48	147.8	132	−113	−1.2	6

== Personal life ==
Barkley's cousin, Robbie Boyer, was a walk-on at USC during Barkley's freshman, sophomore, and junior years. His younger siblings, twins Sam and Lainy, also attended USC.

Barkley is a Christian. During Christmas 2008, he went with a group of friends and family to help run an orphanage in South Africa. For Christmas 2010, Barkley spent his winter break in Nigeria "visiting orphans, widows, villagers and prisoners, doing construction work, distributing supplies and gifts and sharing daily fellowship". In 2012, he led a group of 16 USC football teammates to Haiti, where they built houses and delivered more than 2,000 pounds of supplies for orphanages and schools. Barkley appears on I Am Second, sharing the story of his Christian faith and personal relationship with Jesus Christ. At the beginning of his USC career, Barkley befriended former USC Olympian, World War II prisoner of war and inspirational speaker Louis Zamperini.

Barkley married his high school sweetheart Brittany Langdon in July 2013. In December 2014, Langdon announced via Twitter that she was pregnant. Their son, John, was born in 2015.

== See also ==
- List of Division I FBS passing touchdown leaders
