= 2011 Utah Utes football team =

American college football season

2011 Utah Utes football

Sun Bowl champion

Sun Bowl, W 30–27 ^{OT} vs. Georgia Tech
- Conference: Pac-12 Conference
- South Division
- Record: 8–5 (4–5 Pac-12)
- Head coach: Kyle Whittingham (7th season)
- Offensive coordinator: Norm Chow (1st season)
- Offensive scheme: Pro-style
- Defensive coordinator: Kalani Sitake (3rd season)
- Base defense: 4–3
- Captains: Tony Bergstrom; Star Lotulelei; Matt Martinez; Luke Matthews; Chaz Walker; Jordan Wynn
- Home stadium: Rice-Eccles Stadium

2011 Pac-12 Conference football standings
	Conf.			Overall
Team	W		L	W		L
North Division
No. 4 Oregon xy$	8	–	1	12	–	2
No. 7 Stanford x%	8	–	1	11	–	2
Washington	5	–	4	7	–	6
California	4	–	5	7	–	6
Oregon State	3	–	6	3	–	9
Washington State	2	–	7	4	–	8
South Division
No. 6 USC †	7	–	2	10	–	2
UCLA xy	5	–	4	6	–	8
Utah	4	–	5	8	–	5
Arizona State	4	–	5	6	–	7
Arizona	2	–	7	4	–	8
Colorado	2	–	7	3	–	10
Championship: Oregon 49, UCLA 31
$ – BCS representative as conference champion; % – BCS at-large representative; x – Division champion/co-champions; y – Championship game participant; † – USC ineligible for championship and postseason due to NCAA sanctions; Rankings from AP Poll

The 2011 Utah Utes football team represented the University of Utah in the 2011 NCAA Division I FBS football season. The team was coached by seventh year head coach Kyle Whittingham and played their home games in Rice-Eccles Stadium in Salt Lake City, Utah. After playing the previous 12 seasons in the Mountain West Conference, this was Utah's first season in the new Pac-12 Conference in the South Division. They are the first former "BCS Buster" to join a BCS conference. They finished the season 8–5, 4–5 to finish in a tie for third place in the South Division. They were invited to the Sun Bowl where they defeated Georgia Tech 30–27 in overtime.

== Schedule ==
Date	Time	Opponent	Site	TV	Result	Attendance
September 1	6:00 p.m.	No. 6 (FCS) Montana State*	Rice-Eccles Stadium; Salt Lake City, UT	KJZZ	W 27–10	45,311
September 10	5:30 p.m.	at USC	Los Angeles Memorial Coliseum; Los Angeles, CA	Versus	L 14–23	73,821
September 17	7:15 p.m.	at BYU*	LaVell Edwards Stadium; Provo, UT (Holy War)	ESPN2	W 54–10	63,742
October 1	5:00 p.m.	Washington^{†}	Rice-Eccles Stadium; Salt Lake City, UT	FSN	L 14–31	45,412
October 8	1:30 p.m.	No. 22 Arizona State	Rice-Eccles Stadium; Salt Lake City, UT	FSN	L 14–35	45,089
October 15	10:00 a.m.	at Pittsburgh*	Heinz Field; Pittsburgh, PA	ESPNU	W 26–14	43,719
October 22	5:00 p.m.	at California	AT&T Park; San Francisco, CA	KJZZ	L 10–34	35,182
October 29	5:00 p.m.	Oregon State	Rice-Eccles Stadium; Salt Lake City, UT	KJZZ	W 27–8	45,017
November 5	5:00 p.m.	at Arizona	Arizona Stadium; Tucson, AZ	KJZZ	W 34–21	50,389
November 12	4:30 p.m.	UCLA	Rice-Eccles Stadium; Salt Lake City, UT	KJZZ	W 31–6	45,039
November 19	3:00 p.m.	at Washington State	Martin Stadium; Pullman, WA	KJZZ	W 30–27 ^{OT}	16,419
November 25	1:30 p.m.	Colorado	Rice-Eccles Stadium; Salt Lake City, UT (Rumble in the Rockies)	FSN	L 14–17	45,026
December 31	12:00 p.m.	vs. Georgia Tech*	Sun Bowl Stadium; El Paso, TX (Sun Bowl)	CBS	W 30–27 ^{OT}	48,123
*Non-conference game; ^{†}Homecoming; Rankings from AP Poll released prior to the game; All times are in Mountain time

== Before the season ==
The Pac-12 media picked Utah to finish third in the South Division. Four media members (out of 42 total) voted Utah first in the division. The media picked USC to finish first, but USC will be ineligible for the inaugural Pac-12 Championship Game due to NCAA sanctions. Arizona State came in second, and Arizona, UCLA, and Colorado finished fourth, fifth, and sixth, respectively, in the South Division voting. The media also picked Oregon to win the North Division with 29 first place votes, and to win the Pac-12 Championship Game and thus be the Pac-12 Champion.

=== Coaching changes ===
Kyle Whittingham made a few changes to his coaching staff for the 2011 season. Prior to Utah's appearance in the 2010 Maaco Bowl Las Vegas defensive line coach John Pease retired from coaching. During the offseason, Whittingham replaced Pease with Chad Kauhaʻahaʻa, a second team all-WAC defensive lineman for Utah in 1996. The previous two seasons he had been the defensive line coach for Utah State.

The Utes also hired Norm Chow to be the Offensive coordinator and coach the tight ends. He had been an offensive coordinator at UCLA the three previous seasons. In 2002, when he was the offensive coordinator at USC, Norm Chow won the Broyles Award. Former co-offensive coordinators Aaron Roderick and Dave Schramm were reassigned to coach different positions in the offense. They will coach the receivers and the running backs, respectively, positions they have both previously coached for the program. Finally, Whittingham hired Tim Davis to coach the offensive line. Davis replaces Blake Miller who left the program to coach the same position with Memphis. Davis coached the offensive line the previous three seasons at Minnesota and has had a prior stint as Utah's offensive line coach 1990–1996 and worked under Chow at USC 2002–2004.

=== Move to the Pac-12 ===
During the 2010 offseason, Utah successfully negotiated to join the Pacific-10 Conference (Pac-10) for all sports, including football. Utah, along with Colorado, officially joined the Pac-10 on July 1, 2011 to form the Pac-12 Conference (Pac-12). The previous 12 seasons, Utah competed in the Mountain West Conference.

== Game summaries ==
=== Montana State ===
Montana State at Utah

Team	1	2	3	4	Total
Bobcats	0	7	0	3	10
• Utes	17	7	3	0	27

- Date: September 1
- Location: Salt Lake City, UT
- Game start: 6:07 pm
- Elapsed time: 2:49
- Game attendance: 45,311
- Game weather: 80°, Sunny and Clear, winds NW 8 mph
- Referee: Jay Stricherz
- TV announcers (KJZZ): Steve Brown, Mike Norseth, and David Locke

Utah leads series: 10 – 0

Scoring summary

Quarter	Time	Drive			Team	Scoring information	Score	
Quarter	Time	Plays	Yards	TOP	Team	Scoring information	Montana State	Utah
1	12:56	3	8	:46	Utah	DeVonte Christopher 7-yard touchdown reception from Jordan Wynn, Coleman Petersen kick good	0	7
1	6:06	9	62	4:32	Utah	John White IV 5-yard touchdown reception from Jordan Wynn, Coleman Petersen kick good	0	14
2	1:58	4	-5	1:31	Utah	37-yard field goal by Coleman Petersen	0	17
2	11:53	9	59	4:01	Utah	John White IV 10-yard touchdown run, Coleman Petersen kick good	0	24
2	:35	8	79	3:02	Montana State	Tanner Bleskin 7-yard touchdown reception from DeNarius McGhee, Coleman Petersen kick good	7	24
3	9:01	8	37	3:11	Utah	44-yard field goal by Coleman Petersen	7	27
4	10:37	11	50	5:52	Montana State	37-yard field goal by Jason Cunningham	10	27
"TOP" = time of possession. For other American football terms, see Glossary of American football.							10	27

Utah played Montana State for the 10th time on September 1. Entering the game, Utah had beaten Montana State in all of their nine games, all but one of which have been played in Salt Lake City. During those nine contests, the Utes outscored the Bobcats 455–25.

Utah once again beat Montana State in their 2011 meeting. Utah built a 24–0 lead with a little less than 12 minutes remaining in the second quarter, and then scored 3 points the rest of the game to win 27–10. The Utes finished with 101 passing yards on 15-of-23 passing by quarterback Jordan Wynn. Running back John White finished with 150 yards rushing to lead the Utes.

Linebacker Brian Blechen set-up Utah's first touchdown when he returned an interception 39-yards to the 8-yard line; Montana State quarterback DeNarius McGhee threw the errant pass. Three plays later, Wynn connected with wide receiver DeVonte Christopher for the touchdown. Montana State punted on their next possession, and Utah's offense had its second scoring drive. This one resulted in a 5-yard touchdown pass from Wynn to White; the drive took nine plays and gained 62 yards.

Utah blocked MSU's next punt. Montana State blockers flipped Utah lineback Matt Martinez into the air, which caused Martinez to block the punt with his feet. The ensuing Utah possession resulted in a field goal; kicker Coleman Petersen successfully booted a 37-yard attempt. Following Montana State's third punt of the game, Utah had a nine-play, 59-yard touchdown drive for their last touchdown of the evening. Montana State scored their only touchdown of the evening with 35 seconds remaining in the first half. McGhee passed to receiver Tanner Bleskin for a 7-yard touchdown reception. Each team only scored a field goal in the second half for the final 27–10 score.

=== USC ===
Utah at USC

Team	1	2	3	4	Total
Utes	0	7	7	0	14
• Trojans	10	0	7	6	23

- Date: September 10
- Location: Los Angeles, CA
- Game start: 5:37 pm
- Elapsed time: 3:17
- Game attendance: 73,821
- Game weather: 72°, Hazy, winds S 5 mph
- Referee: Jack Folliard
- TV announcers (Versus): Ted Robinson, Glenn Parker, and Akbar Gbaja-Biamila

Utah trails series: 3 – 7

Scoring summary

Quarter	Time	Drive			Team	Scoring information	Score	
Quarter	Time	Plays	Yards	TOP	Team	Scoring information	Utah	USC
1	4:41	13	54	5:28	USC	47-yard field goal by Andre Heidari	0	3
1	1:58	4	20	1:52	USC	Marc Tyler 6-yard touchdown run, Andre Heidari kick good	0	10
2	:34	12	84	4:09	Utah	DeVonte Christopher 10-yard touchdown reception from Jordan Wynn, 2-point run/pass good/failed/incomplete	7	10
3	9:52	7	88	3:32	USC	Xavier Grimble 9-yard touchdown reception from Matt Barkley, 2-point run/pass good/failed/incomplete	7	17
3	6:20	2	52	:42	Utah	John White IV 1-yard touchdown run, Coleman Petersen kick good	14	17
4	:00				USC	Blocked Field Goal returned 68 yards by Torin Harris	14	23
"TOP" = time of possession. For other American football terms, see Glossary of American football.							14	23

=== BYU ===
Utah at BYU

Team	1	2	3	4	Total
• Utes	7	7	16	24	54
Cougars	3	7	0	0	10

- Date: September 17
- Location: Provo, UT
- Game start: 7:21 pm
- Elapsed time: 3:42
- Game attendance: 63,742
- Game weather: 65°, fair, winds W 2 mph
- Referee: Jack Wood
- TV announcers (ESPN2; BYUtv): Ed Cunningham, Mark Jones, and Jessica Mendoza (ESPN2); Dave McCann, Gary Sheide, and Jarom Jordan (BYUtv)

Utah leads series: 55 – 34 – 4

Scoring summary

Quarter	Time	Drive			Team	Scoring information	Score	
Quarter	Time	Plays	Yards	TOP	Team	Scoring information	Utah	BYU
1	13:58				Utah	Fumble recovery returned 0 yards for touchdown by Derrick Shelby, Coleman Petersen kick good	7	0
1	0:09	6	37	1:52	BYU	46-yard field goal by Justin Sorensen	7	3
2	6:23	4	66	1:59	BYU	Ross Apo 32-yard touchdown reception from Jake Heaps, Justin Sorensen kick good	7	10
2	0:32	6	63	2:11	Utah	Jake Murphy 30-yard touchdown reception from Jordan Wynn, Coleman Petersen kick good	14	10
3	12:14	6	75	2:46	Utah	Dres Anderson 59-yard touchdown reception from Jordan Wynn, Coleman Petersen kick good	21	10
3	9:11	5	19	1:51	Utah	39-yard field goal by Coleman Petersen	24	10
3	8:32	2	3	0:36	Utah	John White 1-yard touchdown run, Coleman Petersen kick no good	30	10
4	14:51	4	3	1:30	Utah	20-yard field goal by Coleman Petersen	33	10
4	9:25	2	82	0:42	Utah	John White 62-yard touchdown run, Coleman Petersen kick good	40	10
4	8:06	1	35	0:08	Utah	John White IV 35-yard touchdown run, Coleman Petersen kick good	47	10
4	3:38				Utah	Fumble recovery returned 57 yards for touchdown by V.J. Fehoko, Coleman Petersen kick good	54	10
"TOP" = time of possession. For other American football terms, see Glossary of American football.							54	10

=== Washington ===
Washington at Utah

Team	1	2	3	4	Total
• Huskies	7	3	14	7	31
Utes	7	0	0	7	14

- Date: October 1
- Location: Salt Lake City, UT
- Game start: 5:10 pm
- Elapsed time: 2:44
- Game attendance: 45,412
- Game weather: 81°, Partly Cloudy, winds SW 5 mph
- Referee: Jay Stricherz
- TV announcers (FSN): Ron Thulin, J. C. Pearson, and Jeremy Bloom

Utah trails series: 0 – 7

Scoring summary

Quarter	Time	Drive			Team	Scoring information	Score	
Quarter	Time	Plays	Yards	TOP	Team	Scoring information	Washington	Utah
1	14:51				Washington	Ryan Lacey kickoff return 70-yards, fumbled, recovered by Jamaal Kearse and returned 18-yards for TD	7	0
1	6:59	5	68	2:23	Utah	Dres Anderson 16-yard touchdown reception from Jordan Wynn, Coleman Petersen kick good	7	7
2	:00	13	68	4:37	Washington	44-yard field goal by Erik Folk	10	7
3	12:13	7	80	2:47	Washington	Kasen Williams 8-yard touchdown reception from Keith Price, Erik Folk kick good	17	7
3	5:36	4	52	1:16	Washington	Jermaine Kearse 23-yard touchdown reception from Keith Price, Erik Folk kick good	24	7
4	9:17	14	74	7:49	Washington	Devin Aguilar 17-yard touchdown reception from Keith Price, Erik Folk kick good	31	7
4	:07	10	72	2:22	Utah	Dallin Rogers 4-yard touchdown reception from Jon Hays, Coleman Petersen kick good	31	14
"TOP" = time of possession. For other American football terms, see Glossary of American football.							31	14

=== Arizona State ===
#22 Arizona State at Utah

Team	1	2	3	4	Total
• #22 Sun Devils	7	3	18	7	35
Utes	7	0	7	0	14

- Date: October 8
- Location: Salt Lake City, UT
- Game start: 1:41 pm
- Elapsed time: 2:57
- Game attendance: 45,089
- Game weather: 49°, Overcast, winds NNE 6 mph
- Referee: Land Clark
- TV announcers (FSN): Craig Bolerjack, Joel Klatt, and Petros Papadakis

Utah trails series: 6 – 17

Scoring summary

Quarter	Time	Drive			Team	Scoring information	Score	
Quarter	Time	Plays	Yards	TOP	Team	Scoring information	Arizona State	Utah
1	10:01	5	46	2:24	Utah	John White IV 30-yard touchdown run, Coleman Petersen kick good	0	7
1	4:31	6	46	2:21	Arizona State	Jamal Miles 5-yard touchdown reception from Brock Osweiler, Alex Garoutte kick good	7	7
2	1:22	9	48	2:55	Arizona State	27-yard field goal by Alex Garouette	10	7
3	10:32	9	79	4:28	Utah	Dallin Rogers 2-yard touchdown reception from Jon Hays, Coleman Petersen kick good	10	14
3	5:00	15	55	5:32	Arizona State	35-yard field goal by Alex Garouette	13	14
3	2:33	5	44	2:09	Arizona State	Mike Willie 14-yard touchdown reception from Brock Osweiler, 2-point pass 2 yds to Aaron Pflugrad good	21	14
3	1:17	3	32	1:03	Arizona State	Cameron Marshall 4-yard touchdown run, Alex Garouette kick good	28	14
4	10:39	10	61	3:33	Arizona State	Mike Willie 12-yard touchdown reception from Brock Osweiler, Alex Garouette kick good	35	14
"TOP" = time of possession. For other American football terms, see Glossary of American football.							35	14

=== Pittsburgh ===
Utah at Pittsburgh

Team	1	2	3	4	Total
• Utes	3	10	3	10	26
Panthers	14	0	0	0	14

- Date: October 15
- Location: Pittsburgh, PA
- Game start: 10:01 am
- Elapsed time: 3:17
- Game attendance: 43,719
- Game weather: 54°, Partly Sunny & Windy, winds WSW 18 mph
- Referee: Michael Batlan
- TV announcers (ESPNU): Rob Stone and Danny Kanell

Utah leads series: 3 – 0

Scoring summary

Quarter	Time	Drive			Team	Scoring information	Score	
Quarter	Time	Plays	Yards	TOP	Team	Scoring information	Utah	Pittsburgh
1	4:52	12	98	2:05	Utah	23-yard field goal by Coleman Petersen	3	0
1	4:52				Pittsburgh	Buddy Jackson 98-yard kickoff return, Kevin Harper kick good	3	7
1	4:52				Pittsburgh	Nick Marsh punt blocked, returned by Antwuan Reed 10 yards for TD, Kevin Harper kick good	3	14
2	3:15	14	71	7:12	Utah	34-yard field goal by Coleman Petersen	6	14
2	2:07	1	33	:07	Utah	Luke Matthews 33-yard touchdown reception from Jon Hays, Coleman Petersen kick good	13	14
3	11:24	9	49	3:36	Utah	39-yard field goal by Coleman Petersen	16	14
4	7:45	9	39	4:05	Utah	45-yard field goal by Coleman Petersen	19	14
4	1:36				Utah	Interception returned 21 yards for touchdown by Derrick Shelby, Coleman Petersen kick good	26	14
"TOP" = time of possession. For other American football terms, see Glossary of American football.							26	14

=== California ===
Utah at California

Team	1	2	3	4	Total
Utes	0	0	0	10	10
• Golden Bears	0	20	7	7	34

- Date: October 22
- Location: San Francisco, CA
- Game start: 5:06 pm
- Elapsed time: 2:49
- Game attendance: 35,182
- Game weather: 78°, Clear, Nil
- Referee: Terry Leyden
- TV announcers (CSN-BA, KJZZ; ESPN Radio): Roxy Bernstein, Mike Pawlawski, and Chris Townsend (CSN-BA, KJZZ); Bill Rosinski, David Norrie, and Joe Schad (ESPN Radio)

Utah trails series: 3 – 5

Scoring summary

Quarter	Time	Drive			Team	Scoring information	Score	
Quarter	Time	Plays	Yards	TOP	Team	Scoring information	Utah	California
2	13:42	12	77	5:24	California	Isi Soefele 5-yard touchdown run, Giorgio Tavecchio kick good	0	7
2	9:24	9	9	4:06	California	35-yard field goal by Giorgio Tavecchio	0	10
2	1:12	6	31	1:24	California	37-yard field goal by Giorgio Tavecchio	0	13
2	:27	2	42	:15	California	Keenan Allen 30-yard touchdown reception from Zach Maynard, Giorgio Tavecchio kick good	0	20
3	8:02	11	87	4:46	California	Zach Maynard 4-yard touchdown run, Giorgio Tavecchio kick good	0	27
4	14:51				California	Interception returned 32 yards for touchdown by Josh Hill, Giorgio Tavecchio kick good	0	34
4	11:16	7	43	3:35	Utah	36-yard field goal by Coleman Petersen	3	34
4	1:06	6	64	2:40	Utah	John White IV 14-yard touchdown run, Coleman Petersen kick good	10	34
"TOP" = time of possession. For other American football terms, see Glossary of American football.							10	34

=== Oregon State ===
Oregon State at Utah

Team	1	2	3	4	Total
Beavers	0	0	0	8	8
• Utes	3	21	0	3	27

- Date: October 29
- Location: Salt Lake City, UT
- Game start: 5:07 pm
- Elapsed time: 3:00
- Game attendance: 45,017
- Game weather: 56°, Mostly Clear, winds NW 8 mph
- Referee: Jack Folliard
- TV announcers (KJZZ, Root NW): Steve Brown, Mike Norseth, and David Locke

Utah trails series: 6 – 9 – 1

Scoring summary

Quarter	Time	Drive			Team	Scoring information	Score	
Quarter	Time	Plays	Yards	TOP	Team	Scoring information	Oregon State	Utah
1	8:08	8	37	3:04	Utah	48-yard field goal by Coleman Petersen	0	3
2	7:04	3	47	1:05	Utah	Dres Anderson 35-yard touchdown reception from Jon Hays, Coleman Petersen kick good	0	10
2	3:06	2	18	:39	Utah	John White IV 6-yard touchdown run, Coleman Petersen kick good	0	17
2	:18	5	80	1:42	Utah	Devonte Christopher 3-yard touchdown reception from Jon Hays, Coleman Petersen kick good	0	24
4	14:55	7	60	3:17	Oregon State	Markus Wheaton 3-yard touchdown reception from Sean Mannion, 2-point pass failed	6	24
4	11:53				Oregon State	Utah Penalty- 1 yard holding for a safety	8	24
4	1:31	7	31	3:01	Utah	20-yard field goal by Coleman Petersen	8	27
"TOP" = time of possession. For other American football terms, see Glossary of American football.							8	27

=== Arizona ===
Utah at Arizona

Team	1	2	3	4	Total
• Utes	3	17	7	7	34
Wildcats	0	7	7	7	21

- Date: November 5
- Location: Tucson, AZ
- Game start: 5:05 pm
- Elapsed time: 3:00
- Game attendance: 50,839
- Game weather: 59°, Sunny w/ High Clouds, winds WNW 7mph
- Referee: Shawn Hochuli
- TV announcers (FSN AZ+, FCS Central, KJZZ): Dave Sitton, John Fina, and Glenn Howell

Utah leads series: 20 – 15 – 2

Scoring summary

Quarter	Time	Drive			Team	Scoring information	Score	
Quarter	Time	Plays	Yards	TOP	Team	Scoring information	Utah	Arizona
1	6:01	4	6	1:26	Utah	33-yard field goal by Coleman Petersen	3	0
2	14:18	5	90	2:13	Utah	DeVonte Christopher 65-yard touchdown reception from Jon Hays, Coleman Petersen kick good	10	0
2	11:41	4	30	1:45	Utah	John White IV 18-yard touchdown run, Coleman Petersen kick good	17	0
2	3:45	7	73	3:20	Arizona	David Douglas 23-yard touchdown reception from Nick Foles, John Bonano kick good	17	7
2	0:00	7	41	1:32	Utah	35-yard field goal by Coleman Petersen	20	7
3	12:21	7	92	2:39	Utah	Reggie Dunn 44-yard touchdown reception from Jon Hays, Coleman Petersen kick good	27	7
3	5:02	5	71	1:40	Arizona	David Douglas 42-yard touchdown reception from Nick Foles, John Bonano kick good	27	14
4	2:50	7	43	4:39	Utah	John White IV 11-yard touchdown run, Coleman Petersen kick good	34	14
4	00:23	9	88	2:20	Arizona	Daniel Jenkins 29-yard touchdown run, John Bonano kick good	34	21
"TOP" = time of possession. For other American football terms, see Glossary of American football.							34	21

=== UCLA ===
UCLA at Utah

Team	1	2	3	4	Total
Bruins	3	0	0	3	6
• Utes	0	7	14	10	31

- Date: November 12
- Location: Salt Lake City, UT
- Game start: 4:37 pm
- Elapsed time: 3:02
- Game attendance: 45,039
- Game weather: 32°, Snowing, winds NW 5mph to NE 2 mph
- Referee: Michael Batlan
- TV announcers (KJZZ, Prime Ticket, FCS Central): Steve Brown, Mike Norseth, and David Locke

Utah trails series: 2 – 8

Scoring summary

Quarter	Time	Drive			Team	Scoring information	Score	
Quarter	Time	Plays	Yards	TOP	Team	Scoring information	UCLA	Utah
1	3:19	4	4	1:40	UCLA	30-yard field goal by Tyler Gonzales	3	0
2	5:34	7	39	3:34	Utah	John White IV 1-yard touchdown run, Coleman Petersen kick good	3	7
3	9:29	10	74	5:25	Utah	John White IV 13-yard touchdown reception from Jon Hays, Coleman Petersen kick good	3	14
3	3:18	3	47	:45	Utah	John White IV 22-yard touchdown run, Coleman Petersen kick good	3	21
4	13:12	11	54	5:01	UCLA	35-yard field goal by Tyler Gonzales	6	21
4	9:03				Utah	Interception returned 67 yards for touchdown by Conroy Black, Coleman Petersen kick good	6	28
4	4:05	7	25	2:53	Utah	38-yard field goal by Coleman Petersen	6	31
"TOP" = time of possession. For other American football terms, see Glossary of American football.							6	31

=== Washington State ===
Utah at Washington State

Team	1	2	3	4	OT	Total
• Utes	0	7	3	17	3	30
Cougars	0	7	3	17	0	27

- Date: November 19
- Location: Pullman, WA
- Game start: 3:07 pm
- Elapsed time: 3:36
- Game weather: 27°, Light Snow, winds E 5–10 mph
- Referee: Jacon Wood
- TV announcers (KJZZ, FCS Atlantic): Steve Brown, Mike Norseth, and David Locke

Utah leads series: 6 – 5

Scoring summary

Quarter	Time	Drive			Team	Scoring information	Score	
Quarter	Time	Plays	Yards	TOP	Team	Scoring information	Utah	Washington State
2	1:47	10	90	4:34	Utah	Luke Matthews 49-yard touchdown reception from Sean Sellwood, Coleman Petersen kick good	7	0
2	:33	6	77	1:10	Washington State	Marquess Wilson 6-yard touchdown reception from Connor Halliday, Andrew Furney kick good	7	7
3	8:03	7	22	2:38	Washington State	20-yard field goal by Andrew Furney	7	10
3	1:49	11	50	6:09	Utah	33-yard field goal by Coleman Petersen	10	10
4	14:50	5	47	1:27	Utah	45-yard field goal by Coleman Petersen	13	10
4	7:15	6	37	3:12	Utah	John White IV 3-yard touchdown run, Coleman Petersen kick good	20	10
4	6:56	1	47	:12	Washington State	Bobby Ratliff 47-yard touchdown reception from Kristoff Williams, Andrew Furney kick good	20	17
4	6:38	1	56	:12	Utah	John White IV 56-yard touchdown run, Coleman Petersen kick good	27	17
4	3:14	9	74	3:16	Washington State	Jared Karstetter 9-yard touchdown reception from Connor Halliday, Andrew Furney kick good	27	24
4	0:00	6	74	:52	Washington State	17-yard field goal by Andrew Furney	27	27
OT	0:00	4	3	0:00	Utah	38-yard field goal by Coleman Petersen	30	27
"TOP" = time of possession. For other American football terms, see Glossary of American football.							30	27

=== Colorado ===
Colorado at Utah

Team	1	2	3	4	Total
• Buffaloes	7	3	7	0	17
Utes	0	0	14	0	14

- Date: November 25
- Location: Salt Lake City, UT
- Game start: 1:41 pm
- Elapsed time: 2:55
- Game attendance: 45,026
- Game weather: 48°, Mostly Cloudy, winds NW 13 mph
- Referee: Terry Leyden
- TV announcers (FSN): Craig Bolerjack, Joel Klatt, and Petros Papadakis

Utah trails series: 24 – 31 – 3

Scoring summary

Quarter	Time	Drive			Team	Scoring information	Score	
Quarter	Time	Plays	Yards	TOP	Team	Scoring information	Colorado	Utah
1	9:08	12	80	5:52	Colorado	Tyler Hansen 1-yard touchdown run, Will Oliver kick good	7	0
2	7:09	15	69	7:40	Colorado	23-yard field goal by Will Oliver	10	0
3	10:29	11	68	4:27	Utah	Tauni Vakapuna 3-yard touchdown run, Coleman Petersen kick good	10	7
3	4:47	11	82	5:35	Colorado	Evan Harrington 1-yard touchdown reception from Tyler Hansen, Will Oliver kick good	17	7
3	:54	8	58	3:48	Utah	Shawn Asiata 6-yard touchdown reception from Jon Hays, Coleman Petersen kick good	17	14
"TOP" = time of possession. For other American football terms, see Glossary of American football.							17	14

=== Georgia Tech–Sun Bowl ===
2011 Sun Bowl: Georgia Tech vs. Utah

Team	1	2	3	4	OT	Total
Yellow Jackets	0	7	17	0	3	27
• Utes	7	3	0	14	6	30

- Date: December 31
- Location: El Paso, TX
- Game start: 12:21 pm
- Elapsed time: 3:40
- Game attendance: 48,123
- Game weather: 57°, Sunny and clear, winds NE 10mph
- Referee: Wayne Winkler
- TV announcers (CBS; Sports USA): Verne Lundquist, Gary Danielson, and Tracy Wolfson (CBS); Eli Gold, and Doug Plank (Sports USA)

Utah leads series: 2 – 0

Scoring summary

Quarter	Time	Drive			Team	Scoring information	Score	
Quarter	Time	Plays	Yards	TOP	Team	Scoring information	Georgia Tech	Utah
1	9:54	7	73	2:48	Utah	Shawn Asiata 1-yard touchdown reception from Jon Hays, Coleman Petersen kick good	0	7
2	11:39	9	80	4:35	Georgia Tech	Preston Lyons 36-yard touchdown run, Justin Moore kick good	7	7
2	:14	8	67	2:42	Utah	25-yard field goal by Coleman Petersen	7	10
3	10:27	8	32	4:04	Georgia Tech	32-yard field goal by Justin Moore	10	10
3	4:43	4	87	2:11	Georgia Tech	Stephen Hill 31-yard touchdown reception from Tevin Washington, Justin Moore kick good	17	10
3	4:15				Georgia Tech	Interception returned 74 yards for touchdown by Quayshawn Nealy, Justin Moore kick good	24	10
4	6:50	10	71	4:16	Utah	Kendrick Moeai 3-yard touchdown reception from Jon Hays, Coleman Petersen kick good	24	17
4	1:32	4	24	:49	Utah	DeVonte Christopher 24-yard touchdown reception from Jon Hays, Coleman Petersen kick good	24	24
OT		3	8		Georgia Tech	34-yard field goal by Justin Moore	27	24
OT		6	30		Utah	John White IV 8-yard touchdown run, Coleman Petersen kick N/A	27	30
"TOP" = time of possession. For other American football terms, see Glossary of American football.							27	30

== Roster ==
2011 Utah Utes football team roster
Players
Coaches
Offense

Pos.	#	Name	Class
OL	60	Siaosi Aiono	Fr
WR	6	Dres Anderson	RFr
OL	57	Isaac Asiata	Fr
RB	34	Shawn Asiata	Sr
OL	70	Tony Bergstrom (C)	Sr
OL	74	Sam Brenner	Jr
WR	27	Nick Brown	Jr
WR	10	DeVonte Christopher	Jr
OL	77	John Cullen	Sr
RB	5	Eric Davidson	Fr
WR	8	Anthony Denham	Jr
WR	14	Reggie Dunn	Jr
WR	83	Sean Fitzgerald	So
OL	67	Jason Gardner	RFr
QB	9	Jon Hays	Jr
OL	75	Siaosi Halaʻufia	Jr
WR	85	Charles Henderson (injured)	Fr
WR	18	Phil Hinson	Jr
OL	64	Vyncent Jones	So
QB	19	Daniel Kessler	Fr
RB	21	Harvey Langi	Fr
WR	11	Luke Matthews (C)	Jr
WR	16	Griff McNabb	So
FB	48	Max Moala	Jr
TE	81	Kendrick Moeai	Jr
FB	82	Jake Murphy	RFr
OL	78	Daniel Nielson	Fr
WR	32	Geoffrey Norwood	So
RB	36	Jarrell Oliver	Fr
RB	22	Thretton Palamo	So
OL	71	Poʻu Palelei	Jr
RB	44	Lucky Radley	RFr
WR	88	Dexter Ransom	Sr
TE/FB	89	Dallin Rogers (injured)	Jr
OL	56	Kapua Sai	So
QB	12	Adam Schulz	Fr
WR	2	Kenneth Scott	RFr
OL	73	Samu Sitake	Jr
QB	13	Tyler Shreve	Fr
OL	54	Tevita Stevens	Jr
WR	20	Travis Still	Fr
OL	79	Percy Taumoelau	So
OL	76	Jeremiah Tofaeono	So
TE/FB	80	Westlee Tonga	So
RB	24	Tauni Vakapuna	Sr
OL	69	Court Walker	Fr
RB	15	John White IV	Jr
FB	38	Karl Williams	So
QB	3	Jordan Wynn (injured) (C)	Jr

Defense

Pos.	#	Name	Class
DT	91	James Aiono	Sr
LB	50	Kaeo Alo	So
LB	45	Boo Andersen (injured)	Jr
DB	46	Jeff Battle	Fr
DB	35	Greg Bird	Sr
DB	9	Conroy Black	Sr
LB	4	Brian Blechen	So
DB	14	Joseph Bryant	Fr
DB	19	Quade Chappuis	So
LB	51	Dave Fagergren	Jr
DE	96	Nate Fakahafua	Fr
DL	98	Seni Fauonuku	Fr
LB	7	V.J. Fehoko	RFr
DL	97	Tevita Finau	Sr
LB	42	Nai Fotu	Sr
DB	23	Wykie Freeman	So
LB	40	Jacoby Hale	RFr
DT	68	Latu Heimuli (injured)	So
DB	25	Mike Honeycutt	So
DB	30	Chandler Johnson	RFr
DB	39	Michael Kirby	Fr
DL	44	Dave Kruger	Jr
DE	99	Joe Kruger	So
DB	26	Ryan Lacy	Jr
LB	53	Tanner Larsen	Fr
DB	17	Mo Lee	Jr
DT	92	Star Lotulelei (C)	Jr
DE	94	Tevita Malafu	Fr
LB	52	Matt Martinez (C)	Sr
DB	1	Keith McGill (injured)	Jr
DB	16	Devin Mickles	RFr
DB	27	Tyron Morris-Edwards	RFr
DB	5	Damian Payne	RFr
DB	87	Quinton Pedroza	Fr
DT	63	Joape Pela	Jr
DB	33	Terrell Reese	RFr
LB	49	Trevor Reilly	So
LB	12	Griff Robles	So
DE	47	David Rolf	Jr
DB	18	Eric Rowe	Fr
DE	90	Derrick Shelby	Sr
DB	24	Jamal Smith	So
DB	20	Joseph Smith	RFr
LB	31	Victor Spikes	Jr
DE	43	Lei Talamaivao	Sr
DL	59	Ron Tongaonevai	Jr
DB	28	Reggie Topps	Jr
DL	65	Sam Tuiʻone	Fr
DT	58	LT Tuipulotu	So
LB	32	Chaz Walker (C)	Sr
DB	15	Michael Walker	So
DB	21	Tyler White	Fr
LB	13	J.J. Williams (injured)	Sr

Special teams

Pos.	#	Name	Class
LS	62	Patrick Greene	Jr
K/P	30	Nick Marsh	So
K/P	61	Coleman Petersen	Jr
P	86	Sean Sellwood	Jr

Head coach

- Kyle Whittingham

Coordinators/assistant coaches

- Norm Chow (offensive coordinator)
- Kalani Sitake (defensive coordinator/linebackers)
- Tim Davis (offensive line)
- Jay Hill (special teams/cornerbacks)
- Brian Johnson (quarterbacks)
- Chad Kauhaʻahaʻa (defensive line)
- Aaron Roderick (wide receivers)
- Phil Rauscher (tight ends)
- Morgan Scalley (safeties/recruiting coordinator)
- Dave Schramm (running Backs)
- Grant Duff (graduate assistant/defense)
- Chris Polizzi (graduate assistant/offense)

Legend

- (C) Team captain
- (S) Suspended
- (I) Ineligible
- Injured
- Redshirt

Roster
Last update: August 4, 2011
