= Freddie Whittingham =

American football player and coach (born 1966)

Current position
- Title: Tight ends coach
- Team: Michigan
- Conference: Big Ten

Biographical details
- Born: March 16, 1966 (age 60)
- Education: Brigham Young University (1992)

Playing career
- 1984: BYU
- 1987–1989: BYU
- 1990: Los Angeles Rams (Note: Practice squad member)
- 1991: San Antonio Riders
- Position: Halfback / fullback

Coaching career (HC unless noted)
- 2012–2015: Utah (Director of Player Personnel)
- 2016–2025: Utah (TE/RC)
- 2026–present: Michigan (TE)

Accomplishments and honors

Awards
- FBS national champion (1984)

Fred Whittingham Jr. (born March 16, 1966) is an American college football coach and former player. He is the tight ends coach at the University of Michigan, a position he has held since 2026. Whittingham previously coached at the University of Utah from 2012 until 2025. He played college football for the BYU Cougars as a running back. He is the son of Fred Whittingham, and the younger brother of Cary and Kyle Whittingham.

== Playing career ==
Whittingham was raised in Provo, Utah and played as a running back at Provo High School as a freshman and sophomore. After his father accepted a job coaching the Los Angeles Rams in 1982, he attended El Modena High School as a junior and senior. In 1982, Whittingham rushed for over 1,000 yards as a newcomer to the team. In 1983, he rushed for over 700 yards before sustaining an injury during his senior year. The 1983 team was the California Interscholastic Federation champions.

In 1984, Whittingham committed to play college football for the BYU Cougars. His older brother, Cary Whittingham, was a starting linebacker on the team. The 1984 Cougars won the FBS national championship and Freddie appeared as a fullback, carrying the ball 25 times for 67 yards and a touchdown. In 1985 and 1986, as a member of the Church of Jesus Christ of Latter-day Saints, he took two years off from playing football and did a mission trip for his church. He returned in 1987 and was a three-year starting running back for BYU, leading the team in rushing each season. In 1987, he scored three touchdowns, including 129 carries for 418 rushing yards and had 35 receptions for 321 receiving yards. In 1988, Whittingham scored four touchdowns, including 88 carries for 513 yards and 27 receptions for 220 yards. He was an honorable mention All-Western Athletic Conference (WAC) selection. Whittingham was the team captain for the 1989 Cougars, winning the WAC championship and playing with first-year starting quarterback, Ty Detmer, who finished in the top ten in the Heisman Trophy voting from 1989 to 1991 (winning in 1990). Whittingham scored 11 total touchdowns as a senior, including 109 carries for 582 yards and 34 receptions for 465 yards. He finished his career at BYU with 2,595 total yards and 19 touchdowns.

In 1990, Whittingham earned a roster spot with the Los Angeles Rams of the National Football League (NFL), as a member of their practice squad. In 1991, he played for the San Antonio Riders in the World League of American Football.

== Coaching career ==
After his playing career came to an end, Whittingham went back and completed his bachelor’s degree in psychology at BYU in 1992. He spent 20 years involved in higher education, encompassing universities and colleges, working as a sales and marketing executive for McGraw-Hill and Simon & Schuster. In 2012, his brother, Kyle Whittingham, hired him as the director of player personnel for the Utah Utes. In 2016, he was promoted to the tight ends coach and the recruiting coordinator. He remained in that role until 2025, coaching All-Americans such as Dalton Kincaid.

On January 1, 2026, after his brother, Kyle, accepted the head coaching position for the Michigan Wolverines, he was hired in the same role as the tight ends coach. On August 3, 2026, the University of Utah sued Whittingham for breach of contract. The suit alleges that he abandoned his job as Utah's tight ends coach, despite being under contract through January 2027, while not requesting "written consent" to engage in talks with Michigan nor gave a "written notice of resignation" and "actively recruited Utah players and recruits to Michigan while still employed by Utah."

== Personal life ==
Whittingham is the son of Nancy and Fred Whittingham. His father played in the NFL and was a coach for nearly 30 years. He has four siblings: Julia, Brady, Cary and Kyle Whittingham. His father and three brothers all played for the BYU Cougars. Whittingham is the father of three children: Ashley, Sam, and Rachel. He was on the staff at Utah when his son, Sam, walked-on the team in 2015.
