= Fred Whittingham =

American football player and coach (1939–2003)

No. 55, 56, 59, 53
- Positions: Linebacker, Guard

Personal information
- Born: February 4, 1939; Boston, Massachusetts, U.S.
- Died: October 27, 2003 (aged 64); Provo, Utah, U.S.
- Listed height: 6 ft 1 in (1.85 m)
- Listed weight: 240 lb (109 kg)

Career information
- High school: Warwick Veterans Memorial (Warwick, Rhode Island)
- College: BYU (1957–1958); Cal Poly (1960–1962)
- NFL draft: 1963: undrafted

Career history

Playing
- Los Angeles Rams (1963–1964); Philadelphia Eagles (1966); New Orleans Saints (1967–1968); Dallas Cowboys (1969); Boston Patriots (1970); Philadelphia Eagles (1971)

Coaching
- Alhambra HS (CA) (1972) Head coach; BYU (1973–1977) Linebackers coach; BYU (1978–1981) Defensive coordinator; Los Angeles Rams (1982) Special teams coordinator & tight ends coach; Los Angeles Rams (1983–1990) Linebackers coach; Utah (1992–1994) Defensive coordinator; Oakland Raiders (1995) Linebackers coach; Oakland Raiders (1996–1997) Defensive coordinator; Utah (1998–2000) Linebackers coach

Operations
- Los Angeles Rams (1991) Scout

Awards and highlights
- Little All-American (1961); 2× All-CCAA (1961, 1962)

Career NFL statistics
- Games played: 63
- Games started: 19
- Fumble recoveries: 1
- Stats at Pro Football Reference
- Coaching profile at Pro Football Reference

Fred George "Mad Dog" Whittingham (February 4, 1939 – October 27, 2003) was an American professional football player and coach. He played as a linebacker and guard in the National Football League (NFL) from 1963 to 1971, as a member of the Los Angeles Rams, Philadelphia Eagles, New Orleans Saints, Dallas Cowboys and Boston Patriots. He played college football for the BYU Cougars and Cal Poly Mustangs. Whittingham coached at the collegiate and professional levels from 1973 until 2000, including at Brigham Young University and the University of Utah, as well with the Los Angeles Rams and Oakland Raiders of the NFL. He is the father of Freddie, Cary and Kyle Whittingham.

== Early life ==
Whittingham was born in Boston, Massachusetts on February 4, 1939. He was placed in state foster care until he was adopted by the Whittinghams, who lived in Warwick, Rhode Island, when he was nine months old. He attended Warwick Veterans Memorial High School where he played football, basketball, baseball, and participated in track and field. He was an All-State selection in football, basketball, and track and field. Whittingham was voted as one of the 50 best athletes of the century in Rhode Island.

He had a troubled youth and missed half of his senior season, which made some colleges unwilling to work with Whittingham even though he was considered one of the best high school athletes in New England.

== College career ==
Whittingham accepted a scholarship from BYU, after it was the only NCAA Division I school offer he received. He played defensive end for the football team in 1957 and 1958.

He was a part of the Tom Lee boxing team, based on a recommendation he received to control his temper. He won the 1958 Intermountain Heavyweight Championship and the Regional Golden Gloves competition in Las Vegas, receiving offers to turn professional.

In 1959, he decided to transfer to Cal Poly San Luis Obispo, before facing the possibility of being expelled after incurring violations in the school's conduct code.

On October 29, 1960, he was in a hospital with a concussion and didn't travel with his football team during the Cal Poly football plane crash in Toledo, Ohio, as the team was returning from a game against Bowling Green State University. One of his surviving teammates was Ted Tollner, who would also later become a football coach in the NFL.

He was a three-year starter for Cal Poly, playing tight end and defensive end, while earning Little All-America team honors in 1961. In his senior season he played offensive guard, earning All-California Collegiate Athletic Association (CCAA) honors. During his college career, he also competed in track and field, finishing third in the discus and the shot put events in the 1961 CCAA Championships. In 2002, he was inducted into Cal Poly Athletics Hall of Fame.

== Professional career ==
=== Los Angeles Rams ===
Whittingham was signed as an undrafted free agent by the Los Angeles Rams after the 1963 NFL draft. He injured his knee as a rookie and was placed on the injured reserve list. He played guard in 1964, before being waived before the 1965 NFL season on September 1.

=== Philadelphia Eagles (first stint) ===
In 1966, he was signed as a free agent by the Philadelphia Eagles and was converted into a linebacker.

=== New Orleans Saints ===
Whittingham was selected by the New Orleans Saints in the 1967 NFL expansion draft, becoming the franchise's first starting middle linebacker. In 1968, he was named the NFL defensive player of the week, after playing a key role in an upset against the Minnesota Vikings. On September 9, 1969, he was waived after having issues with owner John Mecom.

=== Dallas Cowboys ===
On September 20, 1969, he was signed to the Dallas Cowboys on their taxi squad. He was promoted to the active roster on November 7 and played mostly on special teams. On September 9, 1970, he was cut and signed to the taxi squad. He was released on September 14.

=== Boston Patriots ===
In 1970, Whittingham was signed as a free agent by the Boston Patriots. He played mostly on special teams.

=== Philadelphia Eagles (second stint) ===
On November 5, 1971, Whittingham was resigned by the Philadelphia Eagles to replace an injured Bill Hobbs. He was waived injured in December.

== Coaching career ==
Throughout Whittingham's coaching career he held various assistant coaching positions in both the NFL and the collegiate ranks. After retiring from the NFL he began coaching at the high school level. In 1972, as the first-year head coach for the Alhambra High School in California, Whittingham led the Moors to an 8–1 record and into a pre-CIF playoff game.

Whittingham returned to BYU as a coach in 1973, serving under head coach LaVell Edwards. He coached the linebackers and later became the defensive coordinator. After his time at BYU he left to coach in the NFL, where he spent ten years with the Los Angeles Rams. He returned to college football in 1992 to be the defensive coordinator at Utah. While he was the defensive coordinator for Utah he hired his son, Kyle Whittingham, to coach the defensive line. In 1995 he left to coach in the NFL and Kyle replaced him as defensive coordinator at Utah.

After spending three years with the Oakland Raiders, he returned to Utah to coach under his son, Kyle, as the linebackers coach. He continued in that position until 2001 when he was fired by coach Ron McBride, at which time he encouraged his son to stay on as the defensive coordinator. Whittingham retired from coaching after leaving Utah.

== Family and death ==
While attending Brigham Young University, Whittingham met and married Nancy Livingston, a BYU cheerleader and student from California. Together they had four sons and a daughter: Kyle, Cary, Freddie, Brady, and Julia. Later in life, Whittingham converted to the Church of Jesus Christ of Latter-day Saints, the same church that his wife was a member of and the church that sponsors BYU.

His oldest son, Kyle Whittingham, played briefly in the NFL and became the head football coach for the University of Utah, and the University of Michigan. Fred's second son, Cary Whittingham, was selected by the Cincinnati Bengals in the 1986 NFL draft. In 1987, Cary played for the Los Angeles Rams, with Kyle as a teammate and Fred as his coach. His third son, Freddie Whittingham, led BYU in rushing from 1987–89 and was a member of the Rams in 1990. All four of his sons played college football for the BYU Cougars.

On October 27, 2003, Whittingham died in a hospital in Provo, Utah as a result of complications from a back surgery.
