= Cary Whittingham =

American football player (born 1963)

No. 57
- Position: Linebacker

Personal information
- Born: May 30, 1963 (age 63); San Luis Obispo, California, U.S.
- Listed height: 6 ft 2 in (1.88 m)
- Listed weight: 230 lb (104 kg)

Career information
- High school: Provo (Provo, Utah)
- College: BYU (1981–1985)
- NFL draft: 1986: 9th round, 230th overall pick

Career history

Playing
- Cincinnati Bengals (1986)*; Los Angeles Rams (1987)
- * Offseason or practice squad member only

Coaching
- Timpview High School (2012–2017)

Awards and highlights
- FBS national champion (1984)
- Stats at Pro Football Reference

Cary L. Whittingham (born May 30, 1963) is an American former professional football player. He played linebacker in the National Football League (NFL) and played college football for the BYU Cougars. Whittingham was selected by the Cincinnati Bengals in the ninth round of the 1986 NFL draft. He was also a member of the Los Angeles Rams in 1987.

He is the son of Fred Whittingham, the younger brother of Kyle Whittingham, and the older brother of Freddie Whittingham. In 1984, Cary and Freddie won a FBS national championship together at BYU. As a member of the Rams, he was teammates with Kyle and played under his father, who was the linebackers coach at the time. The three were also together at BYU in 1981. Whittingham was the head coach at Timpview High School in Provo, Utah from 2012 until 2017. He compiled a 63–14 record and won three consecutive UHSAA 4A state championships his first three seasons at Timpview. His son, Jason, was a four-year starter with the Utah Utes for his brother, Kyle, who was the head coach from 2005 until 2025.
