= Kyle Whittingham =

American football player and coach (born 1959)

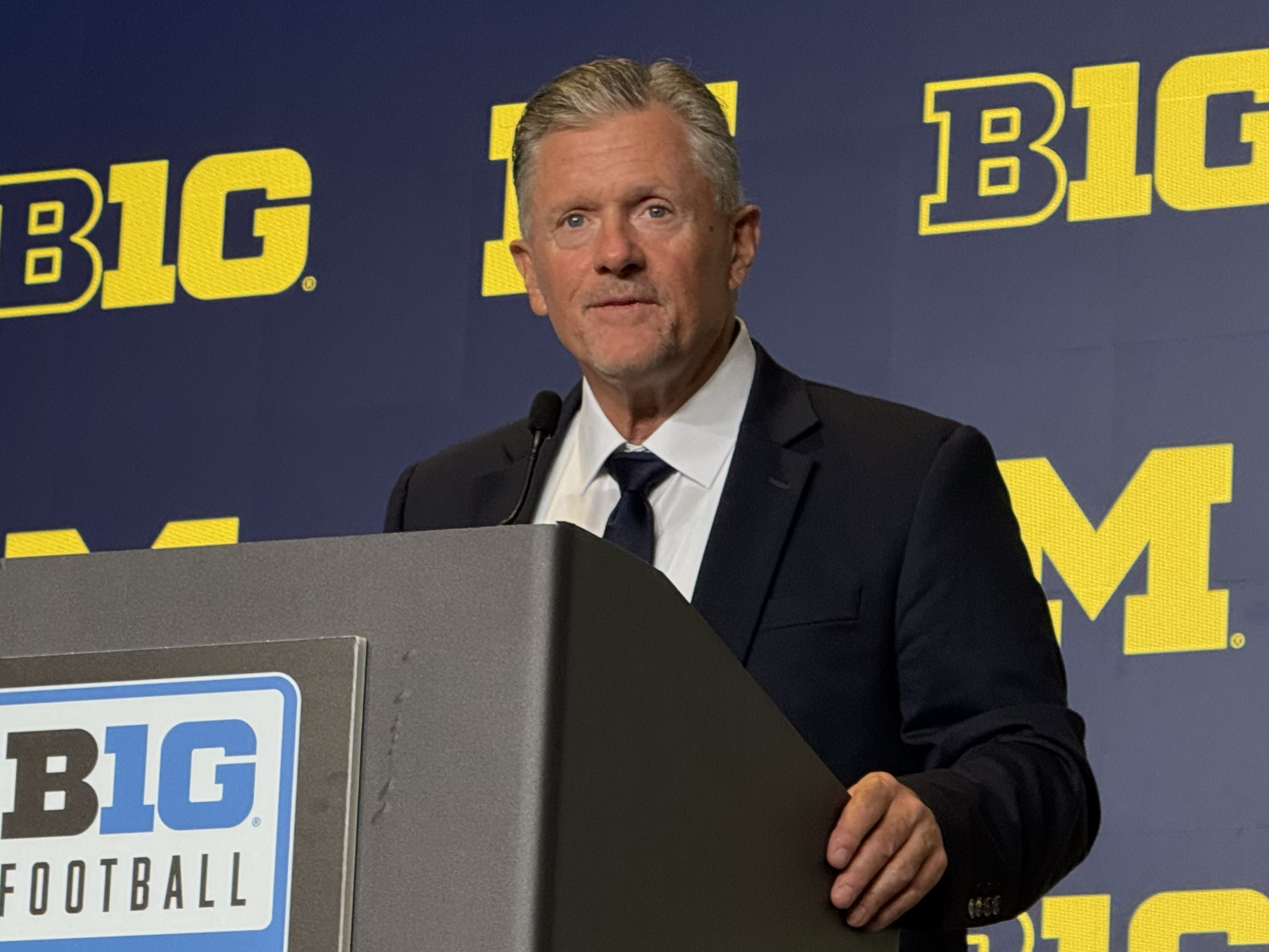
- Whittingham with Michigan in 2026

Current position
- Title: Head coach
- Team: Michigan
- Conference: Big Ten
- Record: 6–5
- Annual salary: $8.2 million

Biographical details
- Born: November 21, 1959 (age 67); San Luis Obispo, California, U.S.

Playing career
- 1978–1981: BYU
- 1982: Denver Broncos (Note: Offseason and/or practice squad member only.)
- 1983: Denver Gold
- 1984: New Orleans Breakers
- 1987: Los Angeles Rams (Note: Strike replacement player.)
- Position: Linebacker

Coaching career (HC unless noted)
- 1985–1986: BYU (GA)
- 1987: Eastern Utah (DC)
- 1988–1991: Idaho State (STC/LB)
- 1992–1993: Idaho State (DC)
- 1994: Utah (DL)
- 1995–1996: Utah (DC/S)
- 1997: Utah (DC/LB)
- 1998–2000: Utah (DC/S)
- 2001–2004: Utah (DC/LB)
- 2005–2025: Utah
- 2026–present: Michigan

Head coaching record
- Overall: 183–93
- Bowls: 11–6

Accomplishments and honors

Championships
- Mountain West (2008); 2× Pac-12 (2021, 2022); 4× Pac-12 South Division (2015, 2018, 2019, 2021)

Awards
- As a coach: AFCA Coach of the Year (2008); Paul "Bear" Bryant Award (2008); Mountain West Coach of the Year (2008); Bobby Dodd Coach of the Year (2019); 2× Pac-12 Coach of the Year (2019, 2021); As a player: AP Honorable Mention All-American (1981); WAC Defensive Player of the Year (1981); First-team All-WAC (1981); Second-team All-WAC (1980)

Records
- Utah Utes all-time wins: 177

Kyle David Whittingham (born November 21, 1959) is an American college football coach and former player, currently the head football coach at the University of Michigan. Whittingham previously served as the head coach at the University of Utah from 2005 until 2025, and is the all-time leader in wins for the program. He served as defensive coordinator of the Utes for ten seasons prior, having spent 32 consecutive seasons with the program. Whittingham won AFCA Coach of the Year and the Paul "Bear" Bryant Award after leading the 2008 Utah team to an undefeated 13–0 season. He is the son of Fred Whittingham, and the older brother of Cary and Freddie Whittingham.

== Playing career ==
As a graduate of Provo High School, Whittingham was all-state at linebacker and fullback, also earning two letters in baseball for the Bulldogs. He remained in Provo, Utah and played college football at Brigham Young University (BYU) for the Cougars from 1978 through 1981. His father, Fred Whittingham, was the defensive coordinator under longtime head coach, LaVell Edwards. As a junior in 1980, he was second-team All-Western Athletic Conference (WAC). As a senior in 1981, he was first-team All-WAC, WAC Defensive Player of the Year, and an honorable mention All-American by the Associated Press. Whittingham played in the first four Holiday Bowls. He was a running back as a freshman in the 1978 Holiday Bowl and a linebacker in the next three, during which he recorded 27 tackles and was the defensive MVP in 1981. In 2009, he was inducted into the Holiday Bowl Hall of Fame.

Whittingham went on to sign with the Denver Broncos of the National Football League (NFL), as an undrafted free agent for spring training in 1982. He was released by the Broncos on July 29, 1982. After being cut, he played linebacker for the Denver Gold and New Orleans Breakers of the United States Football League (USFL) in 1983 and 1984, respectively. Whittingham also played for the Los Angeles Rams of the NFL in 1987 as a replacement player. He was a teammate of his brother, Cary Whittingham, and was coached by his father, who was the linebackers coach for the Rams.

== Coaching career ==
=== Early coaching career ===
In 1985, Whittingham became a graduate assistant for the BYU Cougars after completing his degree in 1984. In 1987, Whittingham was named defensive coordinator at the College of Eastern Utah. He coached there for one season before taking a job at Idaho State University (ISU).

=== Utah ===
After five seasons at ISU, Whittingham joined the University of Utah as the defensive line coach, working under his father, Fred Whittingham. In the 1995 season, Whittingham replaced his father as the defensive coordinator, who had been hired as the linebackers coach for the Oakland Raiders. Whittingham remained the defensive coordinator for ten years, serving under head coaches Ron McBride and Urban Meyer, until being named head coach in 2004.

==== 2004 ====
The 2004 season ended with Utah becoming the first BCS non-AQ conference team to make a BCS bowl game, the Fiesta Bowl. After winning the Fiesta Bowl, the Utes' overall record improved to 12–0 under the leadership of junior starting quarterback Alex Smith (in his final season before declaring for the NFL draft) and head coach Urban Meyer, who announced his departure to the University of Florida in December 2004. After the regular season, and before the Fiesta Bowl, Whittingham was offered the head coaching job at Utah and also the head coaching job at his alma mater, BYU. After struggling with the decision for four days he chose the Utes. Because Meyer had already accepted the head coaching job at Florida before the Fiesta Bowl, Whittingham and Meyer acted as co-head coaches of the 2005 Fiesta Bowl. Utah and the NCAA credit the Fiesta Bowl win to both Meyer and Whittingham.

==== 2005 ====
Whittingham's first season as head coach was an up and down ride for Utah as the team not only adjusted to a new coaching staff, including Andy Ludwig, but also a new offense led by quarterback Brian Johnson. Utah struggled early on, going 3–4 in their first 7 games, however, a strong finish gave Utah their third straight bowl invite.

In the 2005 Emerald Bowl the Utes faced the Georgia Tech Yellow Jackets. Utah beat Georgia Tech 38–10, the Yellow Jackets' worst bowl loss by point margin in school history. Whittingham finished his first year at Utah with a 7–5 record.

==== 2006 ====
In 2006, Whittingham's team faced a degree of adversity. Starting quarterback Brett Ratliff struggled through parts of the year, and so did the Utes. Like the year before, the Utes rebounded toward the end of the season, but lost to rival BYU at home by a score of 33–31. The Utes became bowl eligible for the fourth straight year, a school record. Whittingham led the Utes to a 25–13 victory over the University of Tulsa in the 2006 Armed Forces Bowl, running his record to 15–10 (.600) with Utah.

==== 2007 ====
2007 would provide more adversity. In Johnson's first start since 2005, he broke his collarbone against Oregon State and starting running back Matt Asiata broke his leg as Utah got routed 24–7 by the Beavers. The following week, wide receiver Brent Casteel was lost for the season in a 20–12 loss at home to Air Force.

Utah seemed to recover from the loss the following week with a 44–6 rout of No. 9 UCLA, resulting in the highest-ranked team's defeat by the Utes. The following week represented the worst performing week of Whittingham's head coaching career, a 27–0 loss to perennial cellar-dweller UNLV that had many wondering if Whittingham could survive as a head coach at Utah.

But like past seasons, the Utes regrouped and won seven consecutive games, using a big-play defense and the sledgehammer running attack of Darrell Mack (253 carries, 1,204 yards and 16 total touchdowns), who had been scheduled to redshirt in what was going to be his junior season. The Utes 50–0 drubbing of Wyoming proved controversial. Up 43–0 in the second half, Whittingham decided to go for an onside kick. An emotional Joe Glenn was caught on camera giving Whittingham a middle finger after the play. In the season finale, Utah suffered its second consecutive loss to rival BYU to end the regular season, 17–10.

Whittingham and Utah beat Navy, 35–32, in the 2007 Poinsettia Bowl. It marked the Utes' seventh consecutive bowl victory, which placed them second to Boston College in longest active bowl winning streaks.

==== 2008 ====
In 2008, Utah completed an undefeated regular season and qualified for the 2009 Sugar Bowl. Along the way were wins at Michigan, late come-from-behind wins over Oregon State and TCU, and a convincing victory over rival BYU. Overall, Utah finished the regular season holding wins over three teams in the final AP Top 25.

Utah defeated Alabama, 31–17, in the Sugar Bowl, completing the fifth undefeated and untied season in school history.

The American Football Coaches Association selected Whittingham as the 2008 AFCA National Coach of the Year Award. The announcement was made at the football coaches' convention, which Whittingham attended. The AFCA award is the oldest national coach of the year award, dating back to 1935, and is the only one chosen exclusively by the coaches.

He also won the 2008 Paul "Bear" Bryant Award.

The team was selected national champion by Anderson & Hester,.

==== 2009 ====
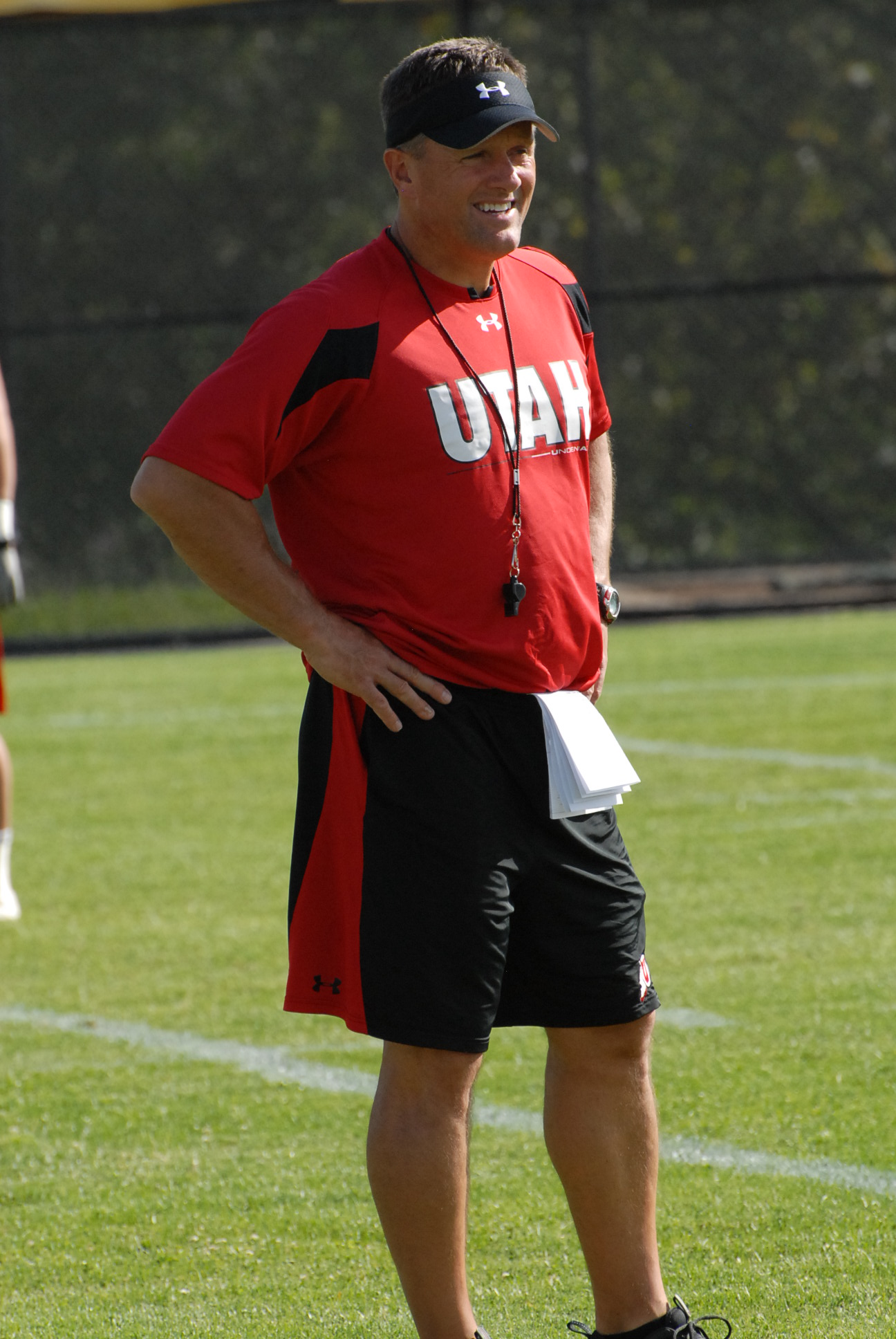
Whittingham at a practice in 2009

In 2009, Utah had its second consecutive 10-win season. They finished with a 10–3 (6–2 MWC) record and a 37–27 win over California in the 2009 Poinsettia Bowl. Whittingham helped the Utes reach these benchmarks with two new coordinators: Dave Schramm as the offensive coordinator and Kalani Sitake as the defensive coordinator. Utah's three losses came against teams that finished the season ranked: Oregon, TCU, and BYU who finished the season ranked No. 11, 6, and 12 in the AP Poll, respectively. Utah finished ranked No. 18 in both the AP Poll and the Coaches' Poll.

==== 2010 ====
Whittingham turned down the head coaching position at Tennessee early in 2010.

Utah started the 2010 season with an upset of then-15th ranked Pittsburgh. The Utes then managed the third 8–0 start in program history, rising to fifth in the BCS rankings. However, during a 68–27 victory over Iowa State, Utah quarterback Jordan Wynn injured his arm and though he continued to play, the injury impacted the remainder of the season. After that 8–0 start, the Utes stumbled badly at home against the TCU Horned Frogs, lost a sloppy contest to Notre Dame and then bounced back to end the regular season with victories over San Diego State and rival Brigham Young University.

Due to the injury, Wynn, who finished the regular season in spite of his injury, missed the Las Vegas Bowl – a 26–3 loss to the Boise State Broncos. It was the program's first bowl loss since the 1996 Copper Bowl and snapped a 9-game bowl winning streak, which was, at the time, the longest active streak in college football.

The Utes finished the 2010 campaign with a 10–3 record. It marked the first time in program history that Utah produced three consecutive ten-win seasons.

==== 2011 ====
In its inaugural season in the Pac-12 Conference, Utah finished with an 7–5 regular season record (4–5 in the Pac-12). The Utes defeated Georgia Tech in the Sun Bowl by a score of 30–27 to end the season.

==== 2012 ====
The Utes went 5–7 in the 2012 season, highlighted with a ranked victory over BYU on September 15.

==== 2013 ====
Whittingham led Utah to a 4–2 start before a five-game losing streak. The 2013 season ended with a high note with a 24–17 victory over Colorado to go 5–7.

==== 2014 ====
Whittingham led the Utes to a 8–4 regular season mark in the 2014 season. The season was highlighted by ranked victories over UCLA and USC. The Utes defeated the Colorado State Rams 45–10 in the Las Vegas Bowl to end the season.

==== 2015 ====
Whittingham led the Utes to a 6–0 start and a #3 ranking in the AP Poll before dropping a 42–24 result to USC. The Utes finished the regular season with a 9–3 record. The team qualified for the Las Vegas Bowl, which ended up being a 35–28 victory over BYU.

==== 2016 ====
On January 29, 2016, The University of Utah announced Whittingham had agreed to a contract extension through the 2020 season. The contract will pay Whittingham $3.3 million per year. This came on the heels of Whittingham surging past McBride to become the second-winningest coach in school history, behind only Ike Armstrong.

Whittingham led the Utes to a 8–4 mark in the regular season, which qualified them to the Foster Farms Bowl. In the Foster Farms Bowl against Indiana, the Utes won 26–24.

==== 2017 ====
The Utes went 6–6 in the 2017 regular season. The team qualified for the Heart of Dallas Bowl, a 30–14 victory over West Virginia.

==== 2018 ====
The Utes finished with a 9–3 regular season mark, which qualified them for the Pac-12 Championship Game. The Utes lost to Washington 10-3.

==== 2019 ====
Whittingham and the Utes opened up the 2019 season with a #14 ranking in the AP Poll. The Utes started 3–0 before a 30–23 loss to USC. The Utes reeled off an eight-game winning streak to qualify for the Pac-12 Championship Game, an eventual 37–15 loss to Oregon. The Utes qualified for the Alamo Bowl, which ended up being a 38–10 loss to Texas.

==== 2020 ====
Whittingham's contract at Utah was renewed through 2027 at around $5 million per year. The Utes' 2020 season was shortened because of the COVID-19 pandemic. They only played five games on the season, finishing with a 3–2 mark.

==== 2021 ====
The Utes started off the 2021 season with a 4–3 start before reeling off a five game-winning streak to close out the regular season. In that stretch was a 38–7 victory over third-ranked Oregon, where Whittingham became the winningest coach in University of Utah football program history with 142 victories. His total eclipsed that of coach Ike Armstrong, who amassed 141 wins from 1925 to 1949. With their 9–3 record, Utah qualified for the Pac-12 Championship Game, a rematch against Oregon. In the game, Utah defeated Oregon 38–10. The Utes qualified for the Rose Bowl, where they lost 48–45 to Ohio State.

==== 2022 ====
Whittingham and the Utes started the 2022 season ranked #7 in the AP Poll for Utah's best ranking to start a season in school history. However, the 2022 season started off with a 29–26 loss to the Florida Gators on the road to drop to #13. Utah recovered with a four-game winning streak before a 42–32 setback to UCLA on the road. The Utes put together another four-game winning streak, highlighted by a 43–42 upset over #7 USC. The Utes split their final two games, a 20–17 loss to Oregon and a 63–21 victory over Colorado. The team qualified for the Pac-12 Championship Game, a rematch against USC. The Utes defeated the Trojans 47–24 in the rematch. The Utes qualified for the Rose Bowl against Penn State, where the Nittany Lions defeated the Utes 35–21.

==== 2023 ====
Whittingham led the Utes to a 8–4 regular season mark that culminated with a loss in the Las Vegas Bowl to Northwestern.

==== 2024 ====
The Utes began the 2024 season ranked #12 in the AP Poll. Unfortunately, the season was plagued by injuries to players including Cam Rising, Brandon Rose, Isaac Wilson, Brant Kuithe, and others, resulting in a disappointing 5–7 season. This was the first time since 2013 that Utah finished below .500, and was not eligible for a bowl game.

==== 2025 ====
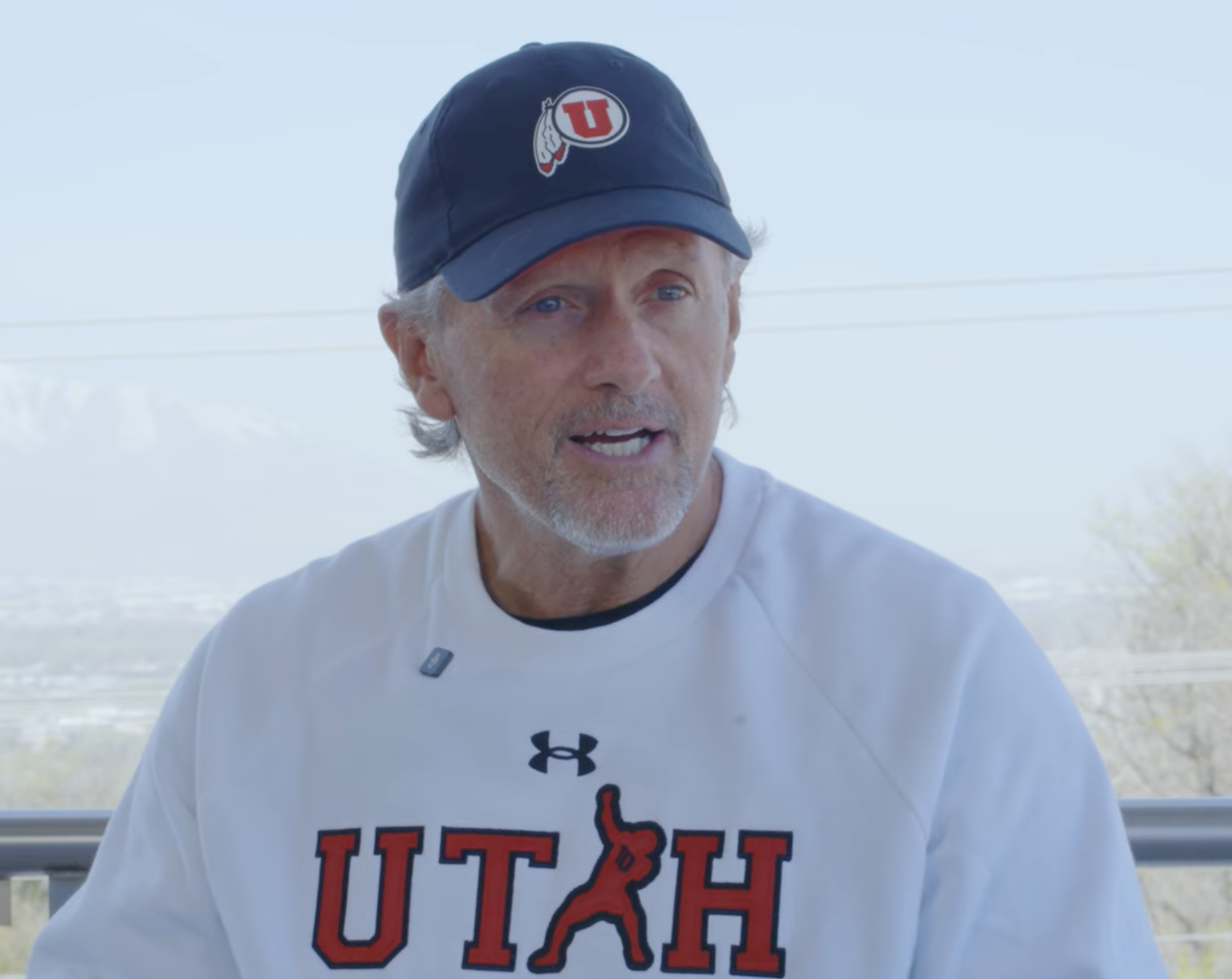
Whittingham with Utah in 2025

Utah finished the regular season with a 10–2 record, and were ranked No. 15 in both the AP poll and CFP rankings. On December 12, Whittingham announced he would be stepping down as head coach after 21 seasons, and 32 total years with the program. At the time of his resignation, he was the second longest tenured FBS head coach at a single school, trailing only Kirk Ferentz. Morgan Scalley, who had been named by Utah as the head-coach-in-waiting in 2020 and 2024, replaced Whittingham on December 13. Whittingham had been known for routinely developing lightly regarded recruits into NFL players. He had been described as having a tenacious, defensive mind and over the years, with his defenses having led in numerous statistical categories.

=== Michigan ===
Despite stepping down at Utah, Whittingham stated his intention to continue coaching. On December 26, 2025, Whittingham agreed to a five-year contract to become the 22nd head football coach at the University of Michigan, replacing Sherrone Moore, who had been fired earlier that month.

In his first game, No. 16 Michigan won, 13–12, against Western Michigan on a controversial last-second Hail Mary. Before the final play, there were loud chants in Michigan Stadium of "Fire Kyle." He then won his next two games against Oklahoma and UTEP to improve to 3–0. This was followed by a loss to Iowa and Minnesota to start the Big Ten Conference season, Michigan’s first losses to each team since 2016 and 2014, respectively. Following the 3–2 start, given Michigan’s preseason expectations as a College Football Playoff contender and status as a top-tier NIL roster, fans and members of the media again began to speculate on him being fired. He was criticized as coaching an undisciplined, sloppy team. Whittingham said after the loss, "I've been in this profession 40-some years and this is the biggest challenge I've had. I promise you we're going to figure it out." Demands of him being fired continued after he lost two additional games over the next four contests, including the first loss to rival Michigan State in five years (as a two touchdown favorite at home). Offensive coordinator Jason Beck, who followed Whittingham from Utah, was fired following the Michigan State loss and replaced by offensive line coach Jim Harding.

== Personal life ==
Whittingham was born on November 21, 1959, in San Luis Obispo, California. His father, Fred Whittingham, played linebacker professionally for eight years, and coached at the college and professional level for nearly thirty years. Fred first served as a coach for the BYU Cougars from 1973 until 1981, where he coached Kyle as the Cougars' defensive coordinator. They also coached together on the same staff at Utah more than a decade later. Fred was the defensive coordinator at Utah from 1992 until 1994, the latter being the year Kyle was hired as the defensive line coach. After Kyle replaced him as defensive coordinator in 1995, Fred returned after coaching the Oakland Raiders' defense to coach the linebackers at Utah under him from 1998 until 2000.

Kyle has a younger sister, Julia, and three younger brothers: Brady, Freddie, and Cary Whittingham. Each played football for BYU: Kyle (1978–81), Cary (1981–85), Freddie (1984, 87–89), Brady (1988). Cary and Kyle were both members of the Los Angeles Rams in 1987, and Freddie was a member of the Rams in 1990; all three playing while Fred was coaching for Los Angeles. Kyle hired Freddie at Utah in 2012, and again as the tight ends coach at Michigan in 2026.

In 1983, he married Jamie Daniels, who he met as neighbors at age 14 in Provo, Utah. He then completed his bachelor's degree in educational psychology in 1984, and earned a master's degree in athletic administration (professional leadership) in 1987. He is a member of the Church of Jesus Christ of Latter-day Saints. Whittingham and his wife have four children: Tyler, Alex, Melissa, and Kylie. His sons, Tyler and Alex, walked-on and played for him at Utah. His nephews, Sam and Jason Whittingham, and Jackson Cravens, also played under him at Utah. Alex was an assistant coach for the Kansas City Chiefs from 2018 to 2025, before being hired as the linebackers coach at Michigan in 2026.

== Philanthropy ==
In 2008, Whittingham and former Utah head coach Urban Meyer were the first people to donate money to the Elder Joseph B. Wirthlin Family Scholarship, an endowed scholarship which benefits the football program.

In 2020, after Ty-Coreous Jordan, Pac-12 Offensive Freshman of the year, was killed in a gun incident, Whittingham and his wife were the original donors to the Ty Jordan Memorial Fund with their donation of $100,000. The following year, Aaron Lowe, Ty Jordan's childhood friend who also played for the University of Utah, was murdered at a house party hours after Utah's win against Washington State. The Ty Jordan Memorial Fund was then renamed the 22 Forever Memorial Scholarship and Whittingham continues to make donations to that scholarship.

== Head coaching record ==
=== College ===
Year	Team	Overall	Conference	Standing	Bowl/playoffs	Coaches^{#}	AP^{°}
Utah Utes (Mountain West Conference) (2005–2010)
2004	Utah	1–0 (Note: Whittingham was co-head coach with Urban Meyer at the Fiesta Bowl. Utah credits the Fiesta Bowl to both Meyer and Whittingham.)			W Fiesta^{†}	5	4
2005	Utah	7–5	4–4	T–4th	W Emerald		
2006	Utah	8–5	5–3	T–3rd	W Armed Forces		
2007	Utah	9–4	5–3	T–3rd	W Poinsettia		
2008	Utah	13–0	8–0	1st	W Sugar^{†}	4	2
2009	Utah	10–3	6–2	3rd	W Poinsettia	18	18
2010	Utah	10–3	7–1	2nd	L Las Vegas	23	
Utah Utes (Pac-12 Conference) (2011–2023)
2011	Utah	8–5	4–5	T–3rd (South)	W Sun		
2012	Utah	5–7	3–6	5th (South)			
2013	Utah	5–7	2–7	5th (South)			
2014	Utah	9–4	5–4	5th (South)	W Las Vegas	20	21
2015	Utah	10–3	6–3	T–1st (South)	W Las Vegas	16	17
2016	Utah	9–4	5–4	3rd (South)	W Foster Farms	21	23
2017	Utah	7–6	3–6	5th (South)	W Heart of Dallas		
2018	Utah	9–5	6–3	1st (South)	L Holiday		
2019	Utah	11–3	8–1	1st (South)	L Alamo	16	16
2020	Utah	3–2	3–2	3rd (South)			
2021	Utah	10–4	8–1	1st (South)	L Rose^{†}	12	12
2022	Utah	10–4	7–2	T–2nd	L Rose^{†}	11	10
2023	Utah	8–5	5–4	T–4th	L Las Vegas		
Utah Utes (Big 12 Conference) (2024–2025)
2024	Utah	5–7	2–7	T–13th			
2025	Utah	10–2	7–2	3rd	(Note: Utah was selected to play in the 2025 Las Vegas Bowl. Whittingham did not coach the game.)	14	14
Utah:		177–88	109–70				
Michigan Wolverines (Big Ten Conference) (2026–present)
2026	Michigan	6–5	3–5				
Michigan:		6–5	3–5				
Total:		183–93					
National championship Conference title Conference division title or championship game berth
^{†}Indicates BCS or CFP / New Years' Six bowl.; ^{#}Rankings from final Coaches Poll.; ^{°}Rankings from final AP Poll.
