= 2011 Sun Bowl =

American college football game

2011 Hyundai Sun Bowl
- 78th Sun Bowl
Georgia Tech Yellow Jackets	Utah Utes
(8–4)	(7–5)
ACC	Pac-12
27	30
Head coach: Paul Johnson	Head coach: Kyle Whittingham
	1	2	3	4	OT	Total
Georgia Tech	0	7	17	0	3	27
Utah	7	3	0	14	6	30
- Date: December 31, 2011
- Season: 2011
- Stadium: Sun Bowl
- Location: El Paso, Texas
- MVP: Devonte Christopher, (Utah- Special Teams) Star Lotulelei, (Utah- Defense) John White (Utah- Offense)
- Favorite: Georgia Tech by 3
- Referee: Wayne Winkler (C-USA)
- Attendance: 48,123
- Payout: US$1.9 million per team

United States TV coverage
- Network: CBS
- Announcers: Verne Lundquist (Play-by-Play); Gary Danielson (Analyst); Tracy Wolfson (Sidelines)
- Nielsen ratings: 2.71

The 2011 Hyundai Sun Bowl, the 78th edition of the game, was a post-season American college football bowl game, held on December 31, 2011 at Sun Bowl Stadium in El Paso, Texas as part of the 2011–12 NCAA Bowl season.

The game, which was telecast at 12:00 p.m. MT on CBS, featured a team from the Atlantic Coast Conference, Georgia Tech Yellow Jackets versus the Utah Utes in their first year of membership in the Pac-12 Conference. The Utah Utes won the game 30–27. The game was broadcast on the radio nationally by Sports USA Radio with Eli Gold and Doug Plank calling the action.

== Teams ==
The two teams have met once before, in 2005 at the Emerald Bowl in San Francisco, California when the Utes defeated the Yellow Jackets 38–10.

=== Georgia Tech ===
Georgia Tech played in its 15th consecutive bowl game, having finished the year with an 8–4 record by winning its first six games. The Yellow Jackets led the ACC in rushing offense (316.8 yards per game), total offense (459.6) and scoring offense (34.9).

=== Utah ===
Utah finished its first Pac-12 regular season with a 7–5 record, which included wins in four of its last five games, plus wins against its non-conference competitors (Montana State, BYU, and Pittsburgh). The Utes entered the game with a 12–4 record in bowl games, including 6–1 under coach Kyle Whittingham. They missed the Pac-12 South Division title by a Colorado defeat on November 25.
