= John White (running back, born 1991) =

American gridiron football player (born 1991)

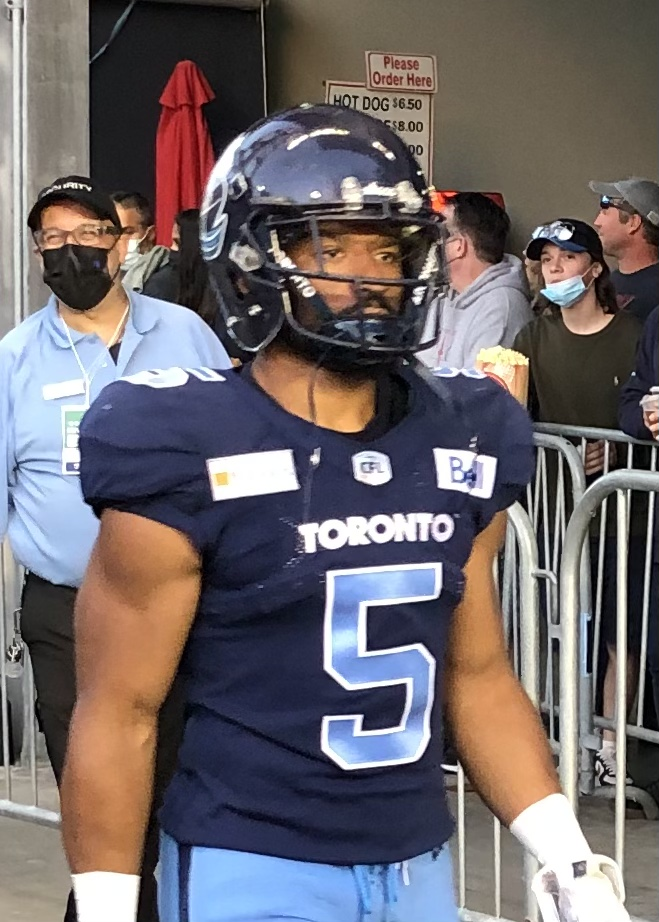
- White with the Toronto Argonauts in 2021

No. 30, 5
- Position: Running back

Personal information
- Born: April 7, 1991 (age 35); Torrance, California, U.S.
- Listed height: 5 ft 8 in (1.73 m)
- Listed weight: 185 lb (84 kg)

Career information
- High school: South (Torrance)
- College: Utah
- NFL draft: 2013: undrafted

Career history
- 2013–2017: Edmonton Eskimos
- 2018: Hamilton Tiger-Cats
- 2019–2020: BC Lions
- 2021: Toronto Argonauts

Awards and highlights
- Grey Cup champion (2015); CFL All-Star (2014); CFL West All-Star (2014); Second-team All-Pac-12 (2011)
- Stats at CFL.ca

John White IV (born April 7, 1991) is an American former professional football running back who played in the Canadian Football League (CFL). He played college football at Los Angeles Harbor College and the University of Utah.

== Early life ==
White lettered in football and track for the South High School Spartans of Torrance, California. He was an all-conference, all-state and all-CIF selection. He recorded 1,850 rushing yards and 29 touchdowns in nine games as a senior in 2008.

== College career ==
White played for the Los Angeles Harbor Seahawks of Los Angeles Harbor College from 2009 to 2010. He set school career records with 2,527 rushing yards, 34 rushing touchdowns, 41 total touchdowns, 248 points, 3,767 all-purpose yards and single-season records with 18 rushing touchdowns, 25 total touchdowns, 152 points and 2,056 all-purpose yards. He was also named Central West Conference Offensive Player of the Year.

White played for the Utah Utes of the University of Utah from 2011 to 2012. He finished his career as the first running back in Utah history to gain 1,000 yards in back-to-back seasons, one of two Utes all-time with two 1,000-yard seasons and the school's single-season rushing record holder with 1,519 yards in 2011. White was the MVP of the 2011 Sun Bowl. He set his school's record for career rushing yards per game with 106.7 and career 100-yard games with 14. He ranked sixth in school history with 2,560 career rushing yards, fourth all-time in 534 career rushes and tied for fourth with 23 career rushing touchdowns.

== Professional career ==
Pre-draft measurables
Height	Weight	40-yard dash	10-yard split	20-yard split	20-yard shuttle	Three-cone drill	Vertical jump	Broad jump	Bench press
5 ft 7 in (1.70 m)	191 lb (87 kg)	4.70 s	1.70 s	2.73 s	4.32 s	7.40 s	31 1/2 in (0.80 m)	9 ft 10 in (3.00 m)	14 reps
All values from Utah Pro Day

=== Edmonton Eskimos ===
White signed with the Edmonton Eskimos of the Canadian Football League on May 8, 2013. In his first season in the league White carried the ball 69 times for 260 yards, only averaging 3.8 yards per carry, with a lone rushing touchdown. He became a bigger part of the Eskimos rushing attack in 2014. White was named CFL Offensive Player of the Week for Week 14 of the 2014 CFL season after recording 199 combined yards, including 192 rushing yards on 17 carries, a 36-yard touchdown run and a 10-yard touchdown catch in Edmonton's 24–0 victory over the Saskatchewan Roughriders on September 26, 2014. He finished the season with 123 carries for 852 yards (6.9 yards per carry) with 2 rushing touchdowns. White finished the season 3rd in the league in rushing yards, trailing only Jon Cornish (CAL) and Anthony Allen (SSK). He also contributed 182 receiving yards on 17 catches, with 1 receiving touchdown. White was named Offensive Player of the Week for the Division Finals, in which the Eskimos were defeated by the Stampeders en route to the 102nd Grey Cup Championship. Following the season White was awarded for this outstanding season by being named both a CFL West All-Star and a CFL All-Star.

White was injured during practice on June 7, 2015. On June 8, the Edmonton Eskimos announced he would miss the 2015 CFL season due to a ruptured left Achilles tendon. Edmonton ended up winning the Grey Cup that year. As the Eskimos starting running back John White played the majority of the 2016 regular season (15 out of 18 games), missing only a few games with minor injuries. During the season, he carried the ball 164 times for 886 yards, and also caught 58 passes for 464 yards. scoring a total of 9 touchdowns. In the first round of the playoffs White set a franchise rushing record racking up 160 yards on the ground, surpassing the previous record of 152 set by Normie Kwong in 1958. White left the second game of the 2017 season with a leg injury. Following the game it was announced that he had torn his ACL, and would miss the remainder of the season: His second major leg injury in three years.

=== Hamilton Tiger-Cats ===
On the first day of training camp in 2018, White was released from Edmonton, with General Manager Brock Sunderland refusing to comment. White was added to the practice roster for the Hamilton Tiiger-Cats following the conclusion of the preseason and spent the first 3 weeks there to learn the Hamilton playbook, while starter Alex Green was injured; reserve national backs Mercer Timmis and Sean Thomas Erlington filled in, with help from Nikita Whitlock who was temporarily converted from defensive lineman to carry the ball. White made his debut in week 4 against Saskatchewan, rushing twice for 9 yards. White would see more usage the next two games, before Green's return caused White to go back to the practice roster. White was called up again towards the end of the season, and produced a 19 carry 63 yard outing with one touchdown, as well as a 15 carry 108 yard effort in back to back games against the BC Lions. White was inactive for the post season, but in his 7 regular season games produced a respectable 78 carries for 400 yards and two scores, as well as catching 8 passes for 51 yards.

=== BC Lions ===
On the first day of free agency in 2019, White was signed by his former Edmonton GM Ed Hervey to play for the BC Lions. This reunited Whte with quarterback Mike Reilly, who had signed from Edmonton earlier in the day. During 2019, White received consistent criticism for his pass blocking errors, but was a dynamo as a rusher, putting up the first 1,000 yard season of his career alongside 7 touchdowns. White missed two games with injury, but was otherwise durable by playing in 16 games, a career high. He also had the most carries in one season of his career, and produced a trio of games where he surpassed the 100 yard mark.

=== Toronto Argonauts ===
On February 9, 2021, White signed with the Toronto Argonauts. He played in 10 regular season games where he had 92 carries for 450 yards one touchdown. He became a free agent when his contract expired on February 8, 2022.

=== Statistics ===
		Rushing						Receiving
Year	Team	GP	Car	Yards	Avg	Long	TD	Rec	Yards	Avg	Long	TD
2013	EDM	15	69	260	3.8	15	1	7	86	12.3	20	2
2014	EDM	9	123	852	6.9	60	2	17	182	10.7	33	1
2016	EDM	15	164	886	5.4	31	8	58	464	8.2	32	1
2017	EDM	2	20	112	5.6	43	1	2	4	2.0	8	0
2018	HAM	7	78	400	5.1	36	2	8	51	6.4	12	0
2019	BC	16	192	1,004	5.2	35	7	46	341	7.4	23	1
2021	TOR	10	92	450	4.9	30	1	15	26	7.0	21	0
CFL totals		74	738	3,964	5.4	60	22	153	1,154	7.5	33	5
