= Star Lotulelei =

Tongan player of American football (born 1989)

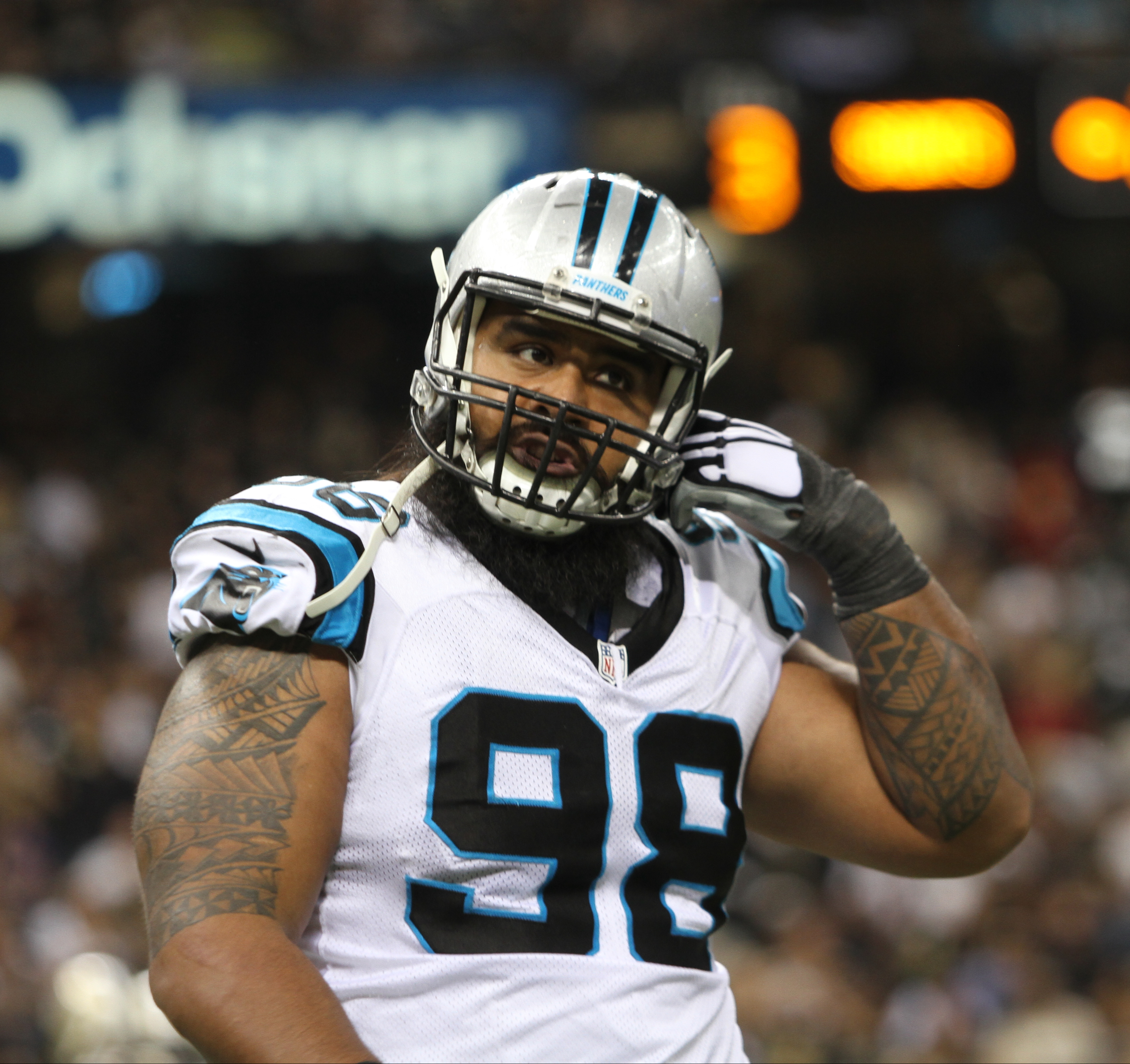
- Lotulelei with the Carolina Panthers in 2015

No. 98
- Position: Defensive tackle

Personal information
- Born: 20 December 1989 (age 36); Tonga
- Listed height: 6 ft 2 in (1.88 m)
- Listed weight: 315 lb (143 kg)

Career information
- High school: Bingham (South Jordan, Utah, U.S.)
- College: Snow (2008); Utah (2010–2012)
- NFL draft: 2013: 1st round, 14th overall pick

Career history
- Carolina Panthers (2013–2017); Buffalo Bills (2018–2021)

Awards and highlights
- PFWA All-Rookie Team (2013); First-team All-American (2012); 2× First-team All-Pac-12 (2011, 2012); Morris Trophy (2011)

Career NFL statistics
- Total tackles: 194
- Sacks: 16.5
- Forced fumbles: 2
- Fumble recoveries: 2
- Interceptions: 1
- Pass deflections: 7
- Stats at Pro Football Reference

Starlite Lotulelei Jr. (/ˌloʊtʊˈlɛleɪ/ LOH-tuu-LEL-ay; born 20 December 1989) is a Tongan former professional player of American football who was a defensive tackle in the National Football League (NFL). He was selected by the Carolina Panthers in the first round of the 2013 NFL draft. He played college football for the Utah Utes, and shared the Morris Trophy for the best lineman in the Pac-12 Conference.

== Early life ==
A native of Tonga, Lotulelei attended Bingham High School in South Jordan, Utah. Playing defensive lineman at 240 pounds, he helped the football team to a 14–0 record and a state title in 2006. Lotulelei registered 72 tackles and seven sacks as a senior.

College recruiting
Name	Hometown	School	Height	Weight	Commit date
Star Lotulelei; DE	South Jordan, Utah	Bingham	6 ft 4 in (1.93 m)	245 lb (111 kg)	
Star Lotulelei; DE	Recruit ratings: Scout: Rivals: 247Sports: (67)				

Regarded as a three-star recruit by Rivals.com, Lotulelei was listed as the No. 3 overall prospect from Utah. However, he was overshadowed by Oregon-bound Simione Fili of Cottonwood High School, who was labeled the best defensive lineman from Utah since Haloti Ngata. Fili eventually bounced around between junior colleges before falling into obscurity and finally becoming a strongman competitor. Lotulelei, too, failed to qualify academically for his original school of choice, Brigham Young University. He eventually spent what would have been his freshman season delivering furniture for a store in Salt Lake City.

== College career ==
=== Snow ===
After a year, he enrolled at Snow College in Ephraim, Utah. Now far over 300 pounds, Lotulelei played defensive line for the Badgers alongside James Aiono, and recorded 52 tackles with 14 tackles for loss, three sacks and one forced fumble in 2008. Snow College reached the 2008 NJCAA National Championship Game, but lost 37–30 in double-overtime to Butler Community College.

Lotulelei took the 2009 season off to preserve another year of college eligibility. He was still recruited by BYU, but also Oregon State, Utah State, and Utah. "The Utah coaches came down to Snow a couple of times," Lotulelei said. "They showed me they really wanted me. It showed me they really cared. So coming here wasn't that hard of a choice."

=== Utah ===
In 2010, Lotulelei transferred to the University of Utah, and played in all 13 games for the Utah Utes football team, and became a starter for the final three games of the season. He totaled 21 tackles with 2.5 tackles for a loss, and also was credited for a half quarterback sack, which came against San Jose State in arguably his best game of the season (season-high five tackles). Lotulelei also made several appearances at offensive guard.

A regular starter in 2011, Lotulelei was an All-Pac-12 Conference performer and won the Morris Trophy as the league's best defensive lineman. He started all 13 games, and registered 44 tackles, 1.5 sacks, one pass breakup, a forced fumble, and a fumble recovery. His 9.0 tackles for loss tied sophomore linebacker Trevor Reilly for second on the team. In a 14–31 loss against Washington, Lotulelei had six tackles including 2.5 tackles for a loss. A week later he had five tackles in a 14–35 loss against Arizona State. Against California, Lotulelei surprised with a 17-yard reception on a fake punt play. Utah finished the regular season 7–5 and played Georgia Tech in the 2011 Sun Bowl. Lotulelei made six tackles and recovered a fumble and was awarded the Jimmy Rogers, Jr. Trophy for the Most Valuable Lineman.

Lotulelei returned to the University of Utah for his senior year, and started in all 12 games at nose tackle. He recorded 42 tackles included a team-high 11 tackles for loss and 5.0 sacks, while also having four pass breakups, four fumble recoveries and three forced fumbles. A season-high seven tackles plus two pass breakup came early in the season in a 24–21 win against the school to which he had previously committed, Brigham Young. Lotulelei blocked a 51-yard field goal attempt with one second remaining following a third-down incompletion. Two weeks later, Lotulelei had a heralded performance against All-Pac-12 center Khaled Holmes of the USC Trojans in a 28–38 loss for the Utes.

== Professional career ==
=== Pre-draft ===
Forgoing the chance of a professional career in 2012, Lotulelei decided to return to Utah after the 2011 season. In preseason mock drafts from May 2012, Lotulelei was listed as a late first-rounder for the 2013 NFL draft as well. By mid-season, he had moved up to a top-3 spot. After the season concluded, Lotulelei was still projected to be picked among the first five selections. Utah had not seen one of their defensive linemen selected in the first round since Luther Elliss went 20th overall to the Detroit Lions in 1995. Lotulelei's rare combination of power, snap count anticipation, instincts, quickness, and athleticism frequently drew parallels to Haloti Ngata.

Pre-draft measurables
Height	Weight	Arm length	Hand span	40-yard dash	10-yard split	20-yard split	20-yard shuttle	Three-cone drill	Vertical jump	Broad jump	Bench press
6 ft 2 1/2 in (1.89 m)	311 lb (141 kg)	33 5/8 in (0.85 m)	9 3/4 in (0.25 m)	5.31 s	1.89 s	3.12 s	4.65 s	7.76 s	30 in (0.76 m)	8 ft 9 in (2.67 m)	38 reps
All values from Utah Pro Day (20 March 2013), except for measurements, which are from NFL Combine

Lotulelei was declared ineligible to participate in the 2013 NFL Scouting Combine after an echocardiogram revealed an abnormally low ejection fraction. While a normal heart will pump between 55 and 70 percent of the blood out of the left ventricle of the heart and into the body, Lotulelei's left ventricle was found to be pumping at only 44 percent. After further tests by cardiologists at the University of Utah, Lotulelei's condition found to be caused by a viral infection and eventually disappeared, showing "complete normalization of the heart muscle function". Lotulelei has been cleared "to participate in professional athletics without restrictions".

A month after the combine, Lotulelei worked out in front of NFL personnel at Utah's Pro Day. He reportedly "looked strong in all the position drills", and registered 38 repetitions in the 225-pound bench press, which would have tied him with Margus Hunt and Brandon Williams for the top mark at the combine. But despite being medically cleared, Lotulelei's falsely assumed heart condition tarnished his draft prospects. Early April mock drafts projected him to fall out of the top-10. However, Lotulelei and Sharrif Floyd were "generally viewed as the top two [defensive tackles] in this class." Only a week before the draft, Lotulelei moved up to the No. 4 spot, right behind Floyd, in Sports Illustrated's' mock draft.

=== Carolina Panthers ===
==== 2013 season ====
Lotulelei was selected in the first round, 14th overall by the Carolina Panthers, as the second defensive tackle selected after Sheldon Richardson.

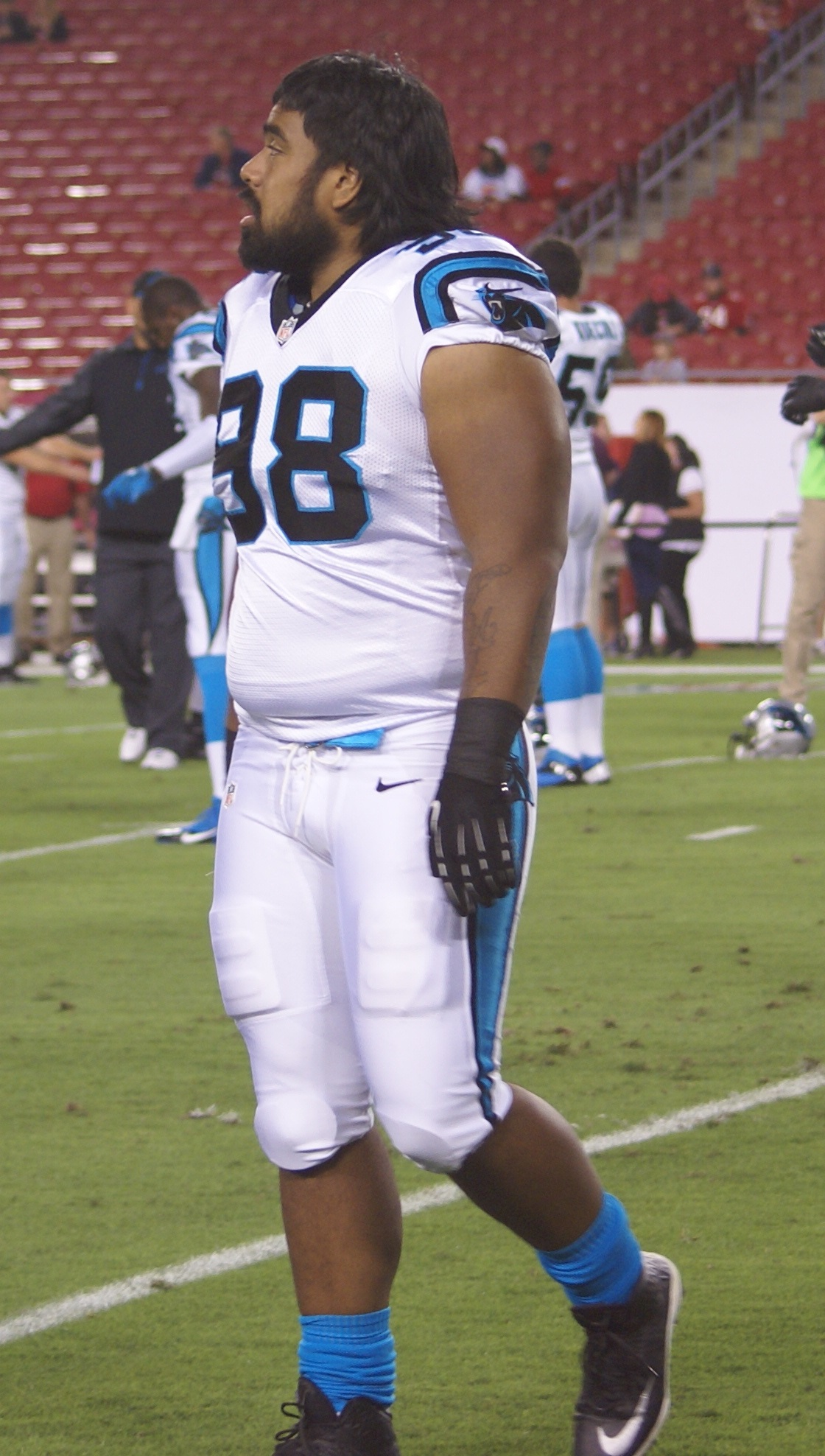
Lotulelei playing for the Carolina Panthers in 2013.

On 22 May 2013, Lotulelei signed a four-year $9.60 million deal. He was named the starting defensive tackle in the 2013 season. On 3 September 2013, Lotulelei changed his jersey number from 96 to 98. He had his first NFL career sack against the New York Giants. In his rookie year, Lotulelei started all 16 regular games for the Panthers, recording 42 tackles, three sacks, and 23 quarterback pressures. He finished second in the NFL in run stop percentage among defensive tackles at 12.9%, was rated by Pro Football Focus as the sixth-best defensive tackle against the run, and helped Carolina improve from 14th in the NFL in run defense in 2012 (110.1 yards per game) to second (86.9 yards per game) in 2013. The Panthers finished first in the NFL with 60 sacks in 2013, second in points per game, and third in DVOA team defense. He was named to the All-Rookie teams by the PFWA, ESPN, ProFootballFocus, and SB Nation. Lotulelei finished 4th in AP Defensive Rookie of the Year voting.

==== 2014 season ====
Lotulelei picked up from his strong rookie performance in his debut against the Tampa Bay Buccaneers where he recorded one quarterback hit, two quarterback hurries, and one tackle. Through the first week of the season, Lotulelei ranked among the top 10 defensive tackles in the NFL in pass rush productivity. During the victory over the Atlanta Falcons in the final game of the regular season that catapulted the Panthers to back-to-back NFC South division titles, Lotulelei finished the afternoon with two sacks, one quarterback hit, and three hurries during his pash rush opportunities on Matt Ryan while recording four stops on only nine snaps against the run. For the season, Lotulelei recorded 21 defensive stops. In his first two NFL seasons, Lotulelei registered 46 run stops and 40 quarterback pressures.

==== 2015 season ====
Lotulelei's 2015 preseason was cut short by a stress reaction in his surgically repaired right foot and it further caused him to miss the first two games of the NFL season, during which the Panthers were able to produce victories over the Jacksonville Jaguars and Houston Texans. During the Panthers' week 4 victory over the Tampa Bay Buccaneers, Lotulelei recorded a key fumble recovery that led to points that gave the Panthers the lead in the game. Against the Philadelphia Eagles, Lotulelei recorded six quarterback pressures. During the Panthers 37–29 victory over the Green Bay Packers that helped the Panthers move to 8–0 in the first time in franchise history, Lotulelei recorded his first sack of the season against quarterback Aaron Rodgers. Lotulelei had 22 tackles, one sack, one forced fumble, one fumble recovery, and two passes defensed on the season. The Panthers finished with a franchise-best 15–1 record and went on to defeat the Seattle Seahawks and the Arizona Cardinals. On 7 February 2016, Lotulelei was part of the Panthers team that played in Super Bowl 50. In the game, the Panthers fell to the Denver Broncos by a score of 24–10. In the Super Bowl loss, he recorded five tackles.

==== 2016 season ====
On 26 April 2016, the Panthers picked up the fifth-year option of Lotulelei's contract.

==== 2017 season ====
On 10 September 2017, in the season opening 23–3 victory over the San Francisco 49ers, Lotulelei's teammate Wes Horton sacked quarterback Brian Hoyer and forced a fumble. Lotulelei recovered the fumble and set the Panthers up for an eventual touchdown-scoring drive. In the 2017 season, he started all 16 games and recorded 1.5 sacks, 25 total tackles, three tackles for loss, five quarterback hits, one pass defensed, and one fumble recovery.

=== Buffalo Bills ===
On 13 March 2018, Lotulelei agreed to a five-year deal worth $50 million with the Buffalo Bills. The deal was finalized the next day, on 14 March. The signing reunited Lotulelei with Buffalo Bills' head coach Sean McDermott, who was previously the defensive coordinator for the Carolina Panthers.

Lotulelei was used mostly as a run-stopping/0-tech tackle in his first season with the Bills. In 2019, he recorded his first sack with the team against the Miami Dolphins in week 11. Two weeks later against the Dallas Cowboys on Thanksgiving Day, Lotulelei recorded his first NFL interception, picking off a screen pass from Dak Prescott and then blocking a field goal in the same game. In the 2019 playoffs, Lotulelei had a key play late in the 4th quarter of the Wild card game against the Houston Texans, stuffing quarterback Deshaun Watson on a 4th down quarterback sneak to give the Bills the ball back, after which they drove down the field for a game-tying field goal, but Buffalo lost in overtime 19–22.

On 28 July 2020, Lotulelei announced he was opting out of the 2020 season due to the COVID-19 pandemic.

In August 2021, Lotulelei was placed in a COVID-19 safety protocol due to a close contact with the virus. He was placed back on the active roster on 27 August 2021.

On 18 March 2022, Lotulelei was released by the Bills.

== NFL career statistics ==
Year	Team	Games		Tackles					Interceptions						Fumbles	
Year	Team	GP	GS	Comb	Solo	Ast	Sack	Sfty	PD	Int	Yds	Avg	Lng	TD	FF	FR
2013	CAR	16	16	42	31	11	3.0	—	—	—	—	—	—	—	—	—
2014	CAR	14	13	26	19	7	2.0	—	1	—	—	—	—	—	—	—
2015	CAR	14	14	22	13	9	1.0	—	2	—	—	—	—	—	1	1
2016	CAR	16	16	26	14	12	4.0	—	1	—	—	—	—	—	1	—
2017	CAR	16	16	25	6	19	1.5	—	1	—	—	—	—	—	—	1
2018	BUF	16	16	17	10	7	0.0	—	1	—	—	—	—	—	—	—
2019	BUF	16	16	19	12	7	2.0	—	1	1	—	—	—	—	—	—
2020	BUF	0	0	Did not play due to Covid-19 holdout												
Total		108	107	177	105	72	13.5	0	7	1	0	0.0	0	0	2	2

== Personal life ==
Born in Tonga, Lotulelei moved with his family to Utah at age 9. His father, Sitaliti, is a Mormon seminary teacher and has a doctorate from Brigham Young University.

Lotulelei is married to Fuiva (née Hola) of Draper, Utah, a former volleyball player he met at Snow College in 2008. The couple has two daughters, Arilani (born 2009) and Pesatina (born 2011).

Lotulelei is a cousin of former AAF linebacker John Lotulelei and brother-in-law to rugby league player Fuifui Moimoi.
