= George Campbell (American football) =

American gridiron football player (born 1996)

No. 15
- Position: Wide receiver

Personal information
- Born: October 27, 1996 (age 30); Clearwater, Florida, U.S.
- Listed height: 6 ft 4 in (1.93 m)
- Listed weight: 183 lb (83 kg)

Career information
- High school: Tarpon Springs (FL) East Lake
- College: Florida State; West Virginia
- NFL draft: 2020: undrafted

Career history
- New York Jets (2020)*; Calgary Stampeders (2021); St. Louis BattleHawks (2023)
- * Offseason or practice squad member only

George Campbell IV (born October 27, 1996) is an American former football player. A wide receiver, he was rated as the tenth best player (and No. 1 rated athlete) by ESPN and as a top-10 wide receiver by Scout.com and Rivals.com in the national high school class of 2015. He completed his junior season at East Lake High School during the 2013–14 school year. He committed to Michigan prior to his high school junior season, but decommitted following the season and committed to Florida State Seminoles, where he used three years of eligibility before graduating. He has also accepted an invitation to participate in the 2015 Under Armour All-America Game. In 2020, he signed as an undrafted free agent with the New York Jets of the National Football League (NFL).

== Early life ==
Campbell is the son of George Campbell III and Joyce Nix. Nix is a certified nurse. At the age of 5, after his father's imprisonment, he developed a close bond with his uncle Ahmad Jackson.

== High school ==
=== Freshman ===
Before his freshman season, he nearly attended Clearwater Central Catholic High School, as well as IMG Academy, but decided to attend his zoned school, East Lake High School in Tarpon Springs, Florida. As a freshman, he played varsity football for East Lake, but mostly on defense. He had 1 reception for a 26-yard touchdown, 2 interceptions and 81 tackles, including 2 forced fumbles. That season East Lake compiled a 9–4 record before losing in the 2011 Florida High School Athletic Association (FHSAA) Class 8A region final in overtime to Plant High School on December 2, 2011. Plant had won state championships in 2006, 2008 and 2009. Plant went on to become state champion that year, marking four consecutive years it had reached a championship game. Campbell accumulated statistics in 12 of the 13 games (not the November 4 game at Palm Harbor University High School). He was named a MaxPreps 2011 U.S. Air Force Freshman All-American first team selection at linebacker, although his true position was safety. He was not selected to the Tampa Bay Times 2011 All-Suncoast Region Football team for Hernando, Pasco, Hillsborough and Pinellas counties or even the Times 2011 All-Pinellas County football team.

=== Sophomore ===
In 2012, East Lake improved to 11–2, but again lost in the FHSAA Class 8A region final, this time to Dr. Phillips High School on November 30 by a 31–21 margin. In the first game of the season, when starter Artavis Scott injured his ankle, Campbell stepped in at wide receiver. Later in the season, when the team struggled to get pressure on the quarterback, Campbell moved from safety to defensive end. As a sophomore, his tackle total declined to 56, but his 764 receiving yards earned him 27 major Division I scholarship offers. His offers included Arkansas, Auburn, Boston College, Clemson, Florida, Florida State, Georgia, Georgia Tech, Illinois, Louisville, Miami (FL), Mississippi, Mississippi State, North Carolina State, Notre Dame, Ohio State, South Florida, Tennessee, Texas A&M, UCF, UCLA, Vanderbilt, West Virginia. East Lake junior offensive lineman Mason Cole committed to Michigan's class of 2014 on February 25, which was one day before Cole was invited to participate in the 2014 U.S. Army All-American Bowl. That year Campbell played basketball and ran track for East Lake before having surgery on his left wrist on April 19. The following summer, he ran a 4.36 second 40-yard dash. His 4.36 time was on artificial turf, while he was timed a 4.37 on grass on the same day. He was also measured at 37 inches (94.0 cm) in his vertical leap. He was a second team All-Suncoast region and first team All-Pinellas County team selection.

=== Junior ===
Prior to his junior season, he verbally committed to the University of Michigan where he would play for Michigan Wolverines football as a freshman for the 2015 team via Twitter. At the time, he still attended East Lake High School, where he was about to play his junior year for the 2013 football team. At the time of his July 27, 2013 verbal commitment, he was ranked as the number one athlete and number three player in the class of 2015 by ESPN. When Scout.com released its first list of 5-star rated football players on August 12, 2013, Campbell was included among the 20 players listed and the only wide receiver included. At the end of that summer prior to his junior year football season, he was one of two juniors selected to the 2013 USA Today preseason All-USA team. He accepted an invitation to participate in the 2015 Under Armour All-America Game in St. Petersburg before the end of October 2013. The November 15 FHSAA Class 7A region quarterfinal that East Lake won 13–12 ended with an alleged punch by a Palmetto High School coach that left Campbell with a cut inside his mouth. Other players were involved in the altercation, which is being investigated by the FHSAA. On November 19, 2013, ESPN moved Campbell up to the number two overall position in the class of 2015. This moved him ahead of Kevin Toliver II, but he remained behind Jashon Cornell. In Campbell's third time in the FHSAA, East Lake finally got past the regional finals (defeating Port Charlotte High School), only to lose the following week on December 6, 2013, in the state semifinals in overtime to Dwyer High School 31–24, despite a 65-yard touchdown reception by Campbell. Following the season, Campbell decommitted from Michigan on December 13.

=== Senior ===
He subsequently named the 10 schools he was considering, while excluding Michigan on July 28, 2014. The 10 schools were LSU, Alabama, Florida, FSU, Georgia, Clemson, UCLA, Ole Miss, Auburn, and Maryland. On September 5, he selected Florida State.

College recruiting
Name	Hometown	School	Height	Weight	40^{‡}	Commit date
George Campbell; WR/DE/S	Tarpon Springs, Florida	East Lake (FL)	6 ft 3.25 in (1.91 m)	186.5 lb (84.6 kg)	4.4	May 9, 2014
George Campbell; WR/DE/S	Recruit ratings: Scout: Rivals: (90)					
Overall recruit ranking: Scout: 55, 7 (WR) Rivals: 35, 4 (WR), 10 (FL) ESPN: 10, 1 (ATH), 5 (FL)
Note: In many cases, Scout, Rivals, 247Sports, On3, and ESPN may conflict in their listings of height and weight.; In these cases, the average was taken. ESPN grades are on a 100-point scale.; Sources:

== College ==
Campbell spent four years at Florida State. His best season was his junior season when he caught 6 passes for 122 yards. Upon graduation, he announced his graduate transfer to Penn State in February 2019. However, he ended up at West Virginia University in June after failing to secure admission into a graduate program at Penn State. 7 of his 19 receptions at West Virginia, where he averaged 24.7 yards per reception, were for touchdowns.

== Professional career ==
After going undrafted in the 2020 NFL draft, Campbell signed with the New York Jets on May 6, 2020. He was waived on September 5, 2020.

Campbell signed with the Calgary Stampeders of the Canadian Football League on January 25, 2021. He was released on July 19, 2021.

Campbell joined the St. Louis Battlehawks of the XFL in February 2023. He was not part of the roster after the 2024 UFL dispersal draft on January 15, 2024.
