= Pinellas County Schools =

School district in Florida, United States

Coordinates: 27.9138°N 82.7930°W

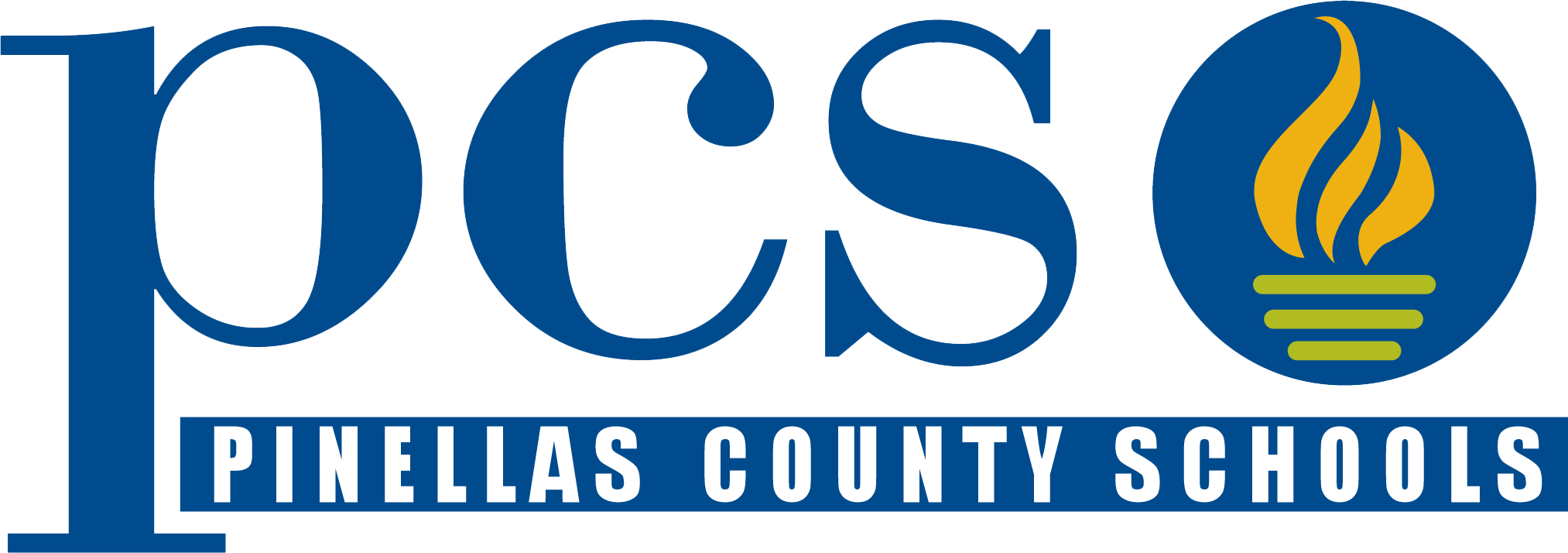

Address
- 301 Fourth Street Southwest Largo, Florida, 33770; United States

District information
- Type: Public
- Grades: PreK–12
- Superintendent: Kevin Hendrick
- NCES District ID: 1201560

Students and staff
- Students: 96,068 (2020–2021)
- Teachers: 6,829.44 (on an FTE basis)
- Staff: 6,858.36 (on an FTE basis)
- Student–teacher ratio: 14.07:1

Other information
- Website: www.pcsb.org

Pinellas County Schools is the public school district serving Pinellas County, Florida. The district is based in Largo. With over 104,000 students served in more than 140 schools and centers, the district is the 7th-largest in Florida and 26th-largest in the nation. In addition to neighborhood schools, the district offers 70 application programs, including magnet, fundamental and career academy programs. It includes the entire county.

== History ==
The district was created upon Pinellas County's split from Hillsborough County in 1912. Dixie M. Hollins was the county's first superintendent of schools.

Like other school districts in Florida and elsewhere in the United States, Pinellas County has had to deal with issues of desegregation, court-ordered busing, and school choice. In 2000, the district received "unitary" (desegregated) status from the court assigned to monitor integration issues, and from 2003 to 2007 operated a "controlled choice" program which set minimum and maximum percentages of black pupils in individual schools.

In 2007 the "Choice" program was replaced with a "close-to-home' school program, where students go to the school that is nearest to their residence. The Tampa Bay Times was the biggest proponent of resegregation. In multiple editorials in 2007, the Tampa Bay Times, formerly the St. Petersburg Times, urged the school district to abandon integration efforts in favor of "close to home" schools.

From 2007 and by 2015 student performance and behavior at five elementary schools in a mostly black area of St. Petersburg sharply declined.

In March 2009, Pinellas County Schools announced that all schools would close one hour early every Wednesday starting with the 2009–10 school year. The district said that this schedule change was to provide teachers with more planning period time. After much controversy, the school district voted in September 2012 to discontinue early release Wednesdays beginning with the 2013–14 school year.

=== Superintendents ===
- Dixie M. Hollins (1912–1920)
- Robert S. Blanton (1920–1928)
- George M. Lynch (1928–1935)
- George M. Hoffman (1935–1936)
- Green V. Fuguitt (1936–1948)
- Floyd T. Christian (1948–1965)
- Paul D. Bauder (1965–1966)
- James F. Gollattscheck (1966–1967)
- Thomas B. Southard (1967–1971)
- Nicholas G. Mangin (1971–1972)
- Gus Sakkis (1972–1981)
- Dr. Scott N. Rose (1981–1991)
- Dr. J. Howard Hinesley (1991–2004)
- Dr. Clayton M. Wilcox (2004–2008)
- Dr. Julie M. Janssen (2008–2011)
- Dr. John A. Stewart (2011–2012)
- Dr. Michael A. Grego (2012–2022)
- Kevin K. Hendrick (2022–present)

== School Board ==
School board members:

- Lisa N. Cane, Chairperson – At-Large District #2 (2018–present)
- Laura Hine, Vice Chairperson – At-Large District #1 (2020–present)
- Dawn M. Peters – At-Large District #3 (2022–present)
- Eileen M. Long – Single Member District #4 (2016–present)
- Carol J. Cook - Single Member District #5 (2000–present)
- Stephanie Meyer – Single Member District #6 (2022–present)
- Caprice Edmond – Single Member District #7 (2020–present)

Districts 1–3 are at-large districts, elected by the voters of the entire school district. Districts 4–7 are single-member districts, voted on only by the voters who reside in the member district. The members from single-member districts are also required to reside within the district from which he or she is elected.

== Schools in Pinellas County ==
The district covers a total of 162 institutions: 75 elementary schools, 24 middle schools, 18 high schools, 6 alternative & exception education schools, 9 adult/vocational schools, 16 centers, and 14 charter schools. With more than 17,000 teachers, administrators and support staff, the district is also Pinellas County's largest employer. Additionally, over 20,000 people serve as volunteers.

=== High Schools ===
- Bayside High School
- Boca Ciega High School
- Clearwater High School
- Countryside High School
- Hollins High School
- Dunedin High School
- East Lake High School
- Gibbs High School
- Lakewood High School
- Largo High School
- Northeast High School
- Osceola Fundamental High School
- Palm Harbor University High School
- Pinellas Park High School
- Seminole High School
- St. Petersburg High School
- Tarpon Springs High School
- Richard O. Jacobson Technical High School

=== Middle Schools ===
- Azalea Middle School
- Bay Point Middle School
- Carwise Middle School
- Clearwater Fundamental Middle School
- Clearwater Intermediate School
- Dunedin Highland Middle School
- East Lake Middle School Academy of Engineering
- James B. Sanderlin IB World School (K–8)
- John Hopkins Middle School
- Largo Middle IB World School
- Lealman Innovation Academy
- Madeira Beach Fundamental School (K–8)
- Mangrove Bay Middle School
- Meadowlawn Middle School
- Morgan Fitzgerald Middle School
- Oak Grove Middle School
- Osceola Middle School
- Palm Harbor Middle School
- Pinellas Park Middle School
- Safety Harbor Middle School
- Seminole Middle School
- Tarpon Springs Middle School
- Thurgood Marshall Fundamental Middle School
- Tyrone Middle School

=== Elementary Schools ===
- Anona Elementary
- Azalea Elementary
- Bardmoor Elementary
- Bauder Elementary
- Bay Point Elementary
- Bay Vista Fundamental Elementary
- Bear Creek Elementary
- Belcher Elementary
- Belleair Elementary
- Blanton Elementary
- Brooker Creek Elementary
- Campbell Park Elementary
- Cross Bayou Elementary
- Curlew Creek Elementary
- Curtis Fundamental Elementary
- Cypress Woods Elementary
- Douglas L. Jamerson Elementary
- Dunedin Elementary
- Eisenhower Elementary
- Elisa Nelson Elementary School
- Fairmount Park Elementary
- Forest Lakes Elementary
- Frontier Elementary
- Fuguitt Elementary
- Garrison-Jones Elementary
- Gulf Beaches Elementary Magnet School
- Gulfport Elementary Montessori Academy
- High Point Elementary
- Highland Lakes Elementary
- James B. Sanderlin IB World School (K–8)
- John M. Sexton Elementary
- Lake St George Elementary
- Lakeview Fundamental Elementary
- Lakewood Elementary
- Lealman Elementary
- Leila G. Davis Elementary
- Lynch Elementary School
- Madeira Beach Fundamental School (K–8)
- Marjorie K. Rawlings Elementary
- Maximo Elementary
- McMullen-Booth Elementary
- Melrose Elementary
- Midtown Academy
- Mildred Helms Elementary
- Mount Vernon Elementary
- New Heights Elementary
- North Shore Elementary
- Northwest Elementary
- Oakhurst Elementary
- Oldsmar Elementary
- Orange Grove Elementary
- Ozona Elementary
- Pasadena Fundamental Elementary
- Perkins Elementary
- Pinellas Central Elementary
- Pinellas Park Elementary
- Plumb Elementary
- Ponce De Leon Elementary
- Ridgecrest Elementary
- Safety Harbor Elementary
- San Jose Elementary
- Sandy Lane Elementary
- Sawgrass Lake Elementary
- Seminole Elementary
- Seventy-Fourth St Elementary
- Shore Acres Elementary
- Skycrest Elementary
- Skyview Elementary
- Starkey Elementary
- Sunset Hills Elementary
- Sutherland Elementary
- Tarpon Springs Elementary
- Tarpon Springs Fundamental Elementary
- Walsingham Oaks School (K-8)
- Westgate Elementary
- Woodlawn Elementary

=== Alternative and Exceptional Education Schools ===
- Calvin Hunsinger School
- Elisa Nelson Elementary (Elementary ESE Full-Time Gifted Academic Programming - North County)
- Hamilton Disston School
- Midtown Academy (Elementary ESE Full-Time Gifted Academic Programming - South County)
- Nina Harris School
- Ridgecrest Elementary Center for Gifted Studies (ESE Full-Time Gifted Academic Programming - Mid-County)
- Paul B. Stephens School
- Pinellas Secondary School (Alternative School) (6–12)
- Richard L. Sanders School (K-12)

=== Career Technical and Adult Education ===
- Clearwater Adult Ed. Center
- Dixie Hollins Adult Ed. Center
- Lakewood Community
- Northeast Community
- Palm Harbor Community
- Pinellas Technical Center (PTC) – Clearwater
- Pinellas Technical Center (PTC) – St. Petersburg
- Seminole Vocational Ed. Center
- Tomlinson Adult Learning Center

=== Charter Schools ===
- Academie Da Vinci (K–8)
- Alfred Adler Elementary (K–3)
- Athenian Academy (K–8)
- Discovery Academy of Science (K-8)
- Imagine Charter (PreK–8)
- New Start (Life Skills North) (9–12)
- Mavericks High North Pinellas (9–12)
- Mavericks High South Pinellas (9–12)
- Pinellas Preparatory Academy (Grades K–8)
- Plato Academy (PreK–8)
- Plato North Academy (K–8)
- Plato Seminole Academy (K–8)
- Plato South Academy (K–8)
- St. Petersburg Collegiate High School (Grades 10–12)

== See also ==
- List of school districts in Florida
- Pinellas Education Foundation
