= East Lake High School =

Coordinates: 28.126593°N 82.70098°W

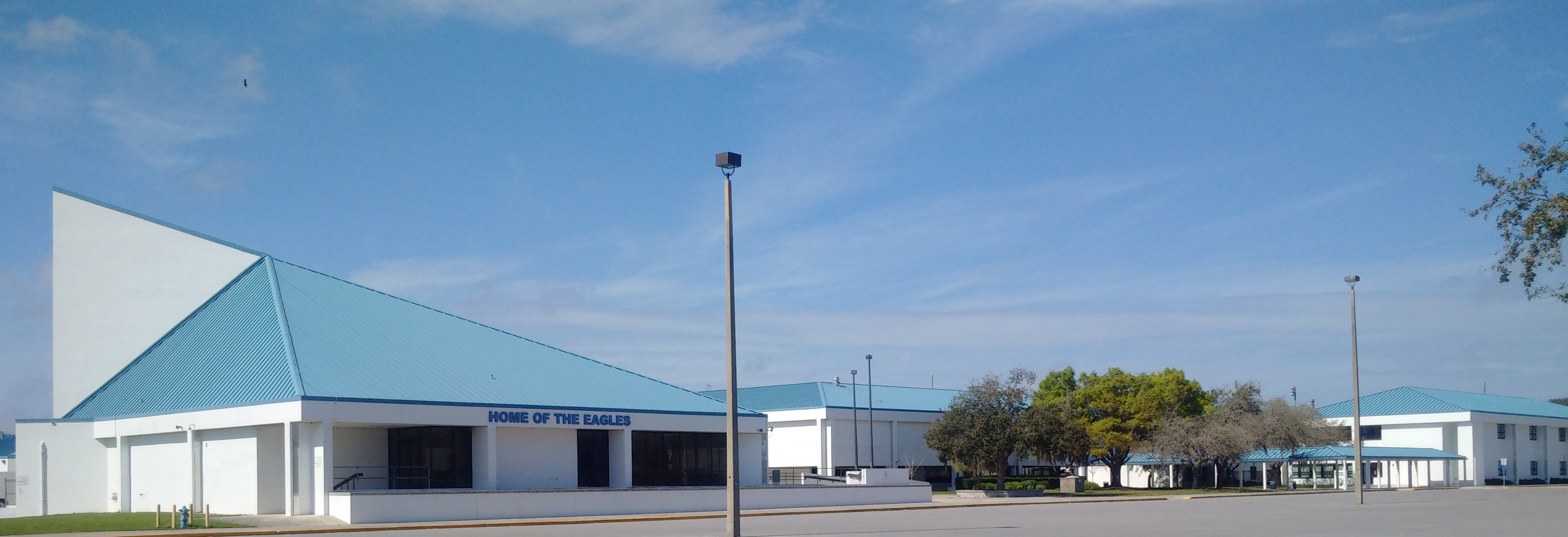
- 1300 Silver Eagle Drive; Tarpon Springs, FL 34688; United States

Information
- Type: Public high school
- Established: 1987
- School district: Pinellas County Schools
- Principal: Eric C. Smith
- Teaching staff: 95.00 (on an FTE basis)
- Grades: 9–12
- Enrollment: 1,980 (2024–2025)
- Student to teacher ratio: 20.84
- Mascot: Eagle
- Rivals: Tarpon Springs High School
- Newspaper: The Talon (Now Defunct)
- Yearbook: Visions
- Colors: Blue and Silver
- Website: www.pcsb.org/eastlake-hs

East Lake High School is a public high school serving students from grades 9–12 in Tarpon Springs, Florida, United States, and is part of the Pinellas County Schools. It has a 99% graduation rate which ranks it among the most graduating schools in the state of Florida.

The nine-building complex was inaugurated in 1987 and is located on 13 acres (53,000 square meters) of land in northern Pinellas County. In 2014, the East Lake Middle School Academy of Engineering was constructed on the campus in addition to the high school.

== Academics ==
The school is composed of four academies: the Biomedical Sciences Academy, Performing Arts Academy, Academy for Business Careers and the Eagle Works Engineering Academy.

The school's curriculum includes courses in English, mathematics, science, social studies, PDHPE (physical education), health education, and fine arts/practical arts. Elective courses include foreign languages (French, Spanish, German, and Chinese), drama, chorus, art, physical education, television production, and band. Other elective courses include Project Lead the Way's Biomedical Sciences and Business Careers.

Honors and Advanced Placement (AP) classes are offered, as well as the opportunity for dual enrollment at nearby St. Petersburg College. The school also offers vocational programs and Gold Seal Endorsements for students working towards a Bright Futures professional scholarship. The school's AP program saw East Lake students take nearly 1600 AP exams in the spring of 2013, more than any other high school in Pinellas County.

== Academy of Biomedical Sciences ==
This program is made up of four main classes as well as elective classes that all work together to prepare the students for the BACE (Biotechnician Assistant Credentialing Exam). The University of Florida works with the program teachers to score the exam.

== Academy for the Performing Arts ==
=== East Lake Chorus ===
East Lake High School has one of the largest music programs in Pinellas County, having nearly 300 students in vocal music, piano, music theory, and guitar classes. The choir performed the Dona Nobis Pacem cantata by Ralph Vaughan Williams in Carnegie Hall in early 2010 in New York City, and returned in 2011 to perform Mozart's Requiem.

In June 2014, the thirty-two choir traveled to France and performed various concerts including a performance at Notre Dame. In 2016, the choir returned to Carnegie Hall collaborating with several other groups to perform Leonard Bernstein's Chichester Psalms.

=== Silver Sound Marching Band ===
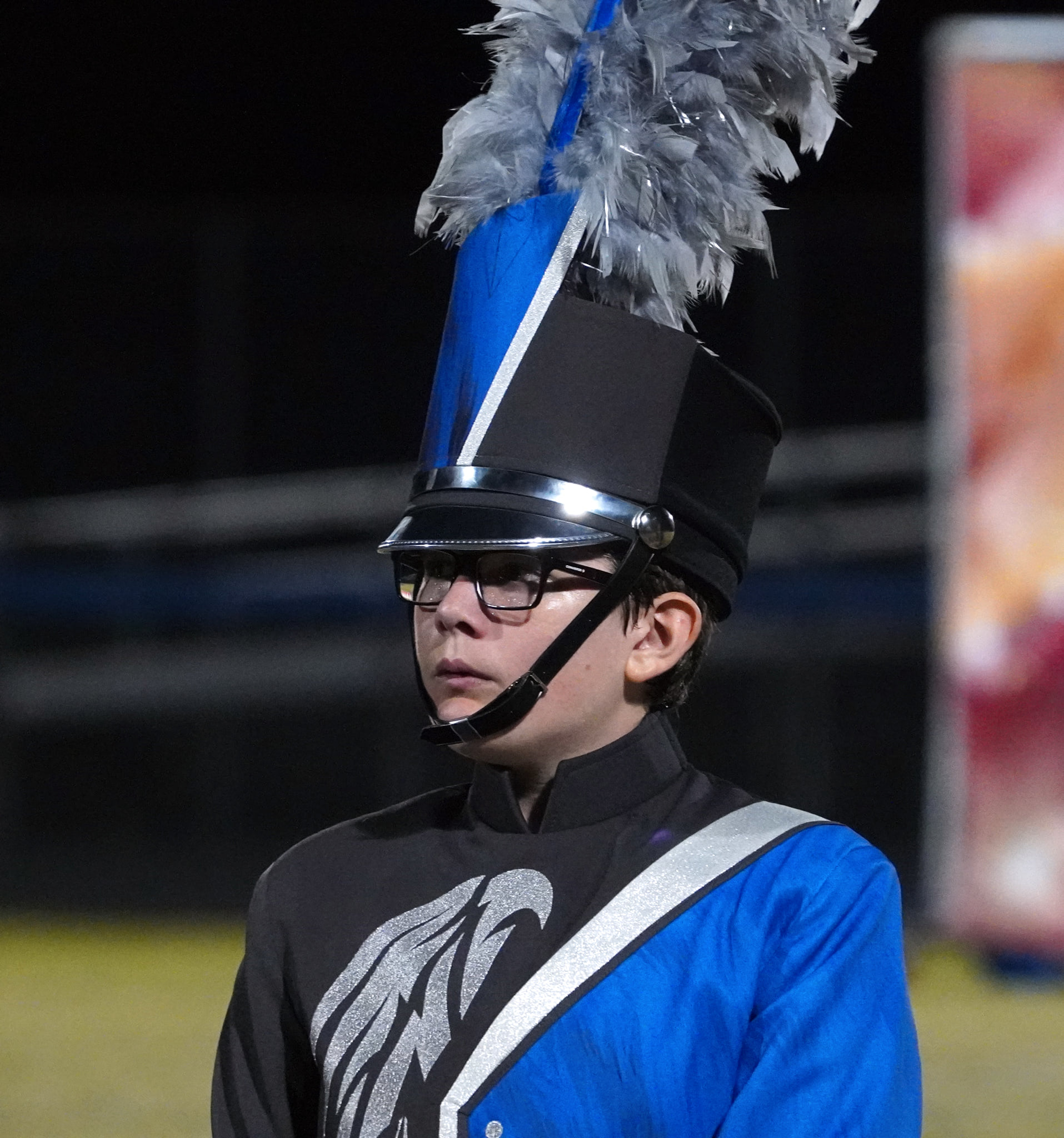
Silver Sound Marching Band

East Lake High School also has a marching band that won seven consecutive state championships from 2003 to 2009 in Florida Marching Band Championships (FMBC) Competition, breaking a state record. All bands consistently earn superior ratings at district Music Performance Assessments. In 2005, the Silver Sound Marching band was asked to march in Governor Jeb Bush's Inaugural Parade. In 2013, the Silver Sound Marching Band was invited to perform in the 2014 National Memorial Day Parade in Washington DC. In 2019 the marching band won first place in their class at Largo High School's 43rd Golden Invitational. The group performs at all home and many away football games. Every year the band holds their East Lake Classic Invitational which brings bands from all over the county to compete against one another in their size classes. The band is part of the Performing Arts Academy at East Lake High School.

=== Concert Band and Wind Ensemble ===
The East Lake High School Concert Band and Wind Ensemble is consistently Superior rated at both district and state level performances at Concert and Solo and Ensemble performance assessments. The members of these bands have an average GPA of 3.9 and made up over a third of the 2021 Pinellas All-County High School Ensembles. In 2022, both the Concert Band and Wind Ensemble competed in the annual Festival Disney music performance competition at Walt Disney World. The bands performed in the Ballroom of the Americas at Disney's Contemporary Resort and awards were presented at Disney's Hollywood Studios theme park. Both bands earned superiors and best in their class, along with the Wind Ensemble earning grand champion for the entire competition.

=== Jazz Ensemble ===
Within the ELHS band program is the Jazz Ensemble. The Jazz Ensemble is known for earning superiors at the annual Pinellas County Jazz Music-Performance Assessment. In 1996, the Jazz Band was selected to perform at various outdoor venues, including the Centennial Olympic Park for the 1996 Summer Olympics held in Atlanta. The trip was cut short due to the domestic terrorist bombing in the very park they were supposed to perform in just days prior.

== Eagle Works Academy ==
=== Engineering ===
This classes in this academy include four different robotics courses, four gaming and simulation courses as well as four engineering fundamental courses. Under the umbrella of the program is an E-Sports team which is one of the first of its kind in Pinellas County as well as a robotics team and an Artificial Intelligence Club.

== Rivalries ==
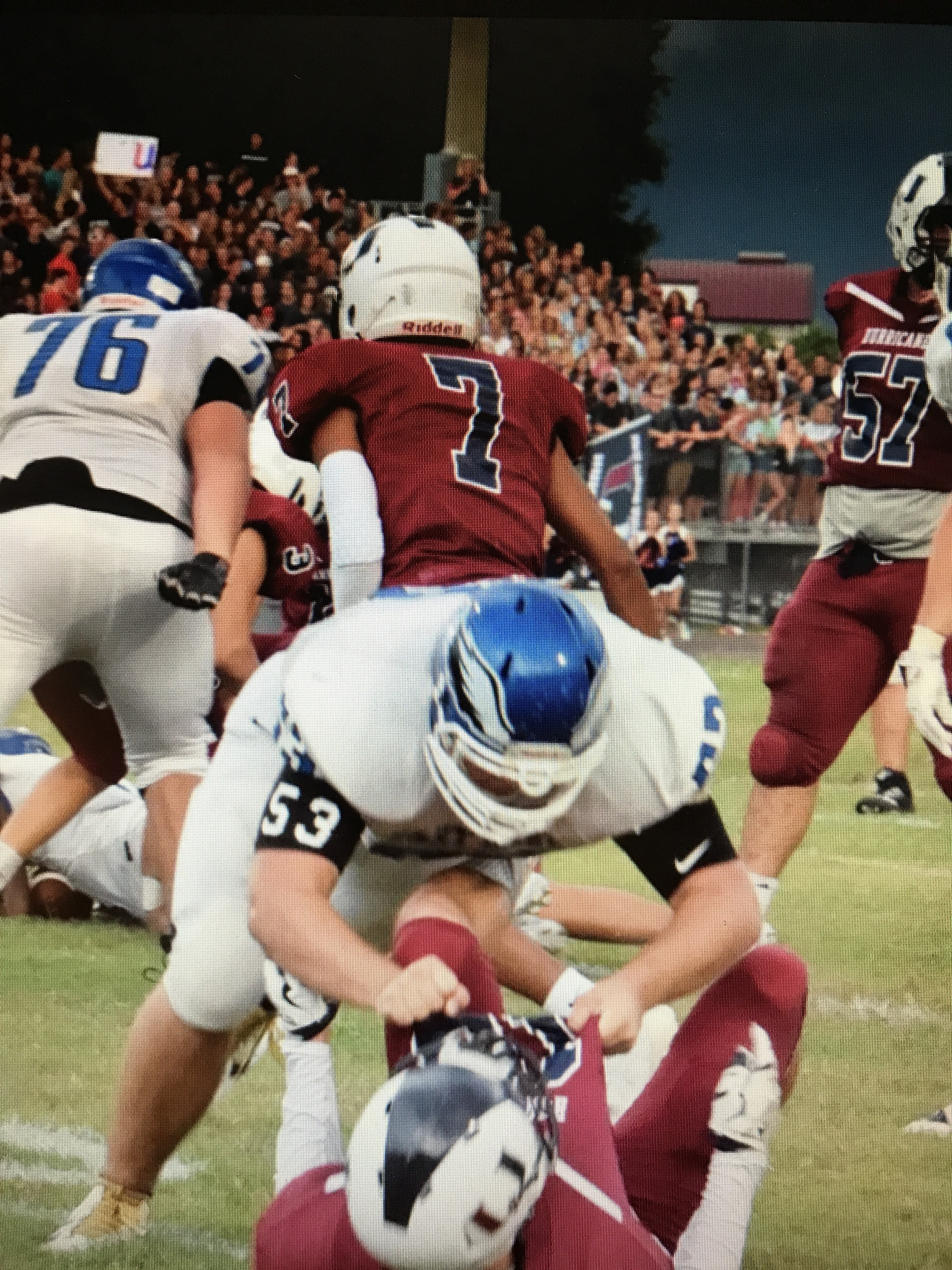
East Lake Vs Palm Harbor rivalry 2017

East Lake High School has a long-standing rivalry with Tarpon Springs High School. As early as 1994, the Tampa Bay Times reported on this rivalry's community history, noting that "in just six years of football games, the East Lake-Tarpon Springs (or Tarpon Springs-East Lake, if you prefer) rivalry has blossomed into a full-fledged community event."

More recently, the school's football matchup with rival Palm Harbor University High School has been described by the Tampa Bay Times as "perhaps the biggest high school football game in Pinellas County."

== TV Production ==
=== Eagle Eye News ===
Eagle Eye News set

Eagle Eye News is East Lake High School's television news program, founded in 2003. It is mostly volunteer-driven and student-run except for faculty sponsor Shawn Anderson.

A part of the news set was donated by WTSP-TV Channel 10 (CBS).

== Notable alumni ==
- Chris Coghlan, former MLB left fielder for the Miami Marlins, Chicago Cubs, Oakland A's, and Toronto Blue Jays, 2009 Rookie of the Year
- Travis MacGregor, MLB pitcher in the Los Angeles Angels organization and formerly in the Pittsburgh Pirates organization
- Eric Hanhold, MLB pitcher for the Milwaukee Brewers, New York Mets, Baltimore Orioles, Pittsburgh Pirates, and most recently the San Diego Padres organization
- Ryan Snare, Former MLB pitcher for the Texas Rangers
- Cheyanne Buys, American female mixed martial artist, Strawweight division of the Ultimate Fighting Championship
- George Campbell (American football), former NFL wide receiver for the New York Jets, Calgary Stampeders of the Canadian Football League, and most recently the St. Louis Battlehawks of the XFL
- Mason Cole, Free agent NFL offensive lineman for the Arizona Cardinals, Minnesota Vikings, and most recently the Pittsburgh Steelers
- Tyler Higbee, NFL tight end for the Los Angeles Rams, Super Bowl LVI Champion
- Justin Strnad, NFL linebacker for the Denver Broncos
- Jake Hansen, NFL linebacker for the Houston Texans
- Artavis Scott, Former NFL wide receiver for the Houston Texans and Los Angeles Chargers, CFP National Champion (2016)
- Micah Abraham, NFL cornerback for the Indianapolis Colts
- Sydney Pickrem, Canadian competitive swimmer. Olympic Silver Medal winner and seven-time World Aquatics Championships medalist.
- Arnie Pantoja, Professional actor
- Parker Valby, Professional American track and field and cross-country athlete who is signed to Nike. Two-time NCAA champion
- Mike Boylan, video blogger, storm chaser, and creator of Mike's Weather Page
- Dylan Rosiek, college football linebacker for the Illinois Fighting Illini
- Charles Bishop, suicide pilot of the 2002 Tampa Cessna 172 crash
