= Osceola High School =

Osceola High School may refer to:

- Osceola High School (Arkansas) in Osceola, Arkansas
- Osceola High School (Seminole, Florida) in Seminole, Florida
- Osceola High School (Kissimmee, Florida) in Kissimmee, Florida
- Osceola High School (Nebraska) in Osceola, Nebraska
- Osceola High School (Wisconsin) in Osceola, Wisconsin
- Osceola High School (Osceola, Missouri) in Osceola, Missouri
