= Lealman Innovation Academy =

Coordinates: 27°49′0″N 82°40′21″W

Information
- Established: 2005; 21 years ago
- School district: Pinellas County Schools
- NCES District ID: 1201560
- Grades: Grade 5 - Grade 8.5
- Website: www.pcsb.org/lealman-ms

Lealman Innovation Academy is a school in Lealman, Florida, in the United States. It is part of the Pinellas County Schools district and is located just west of the St. Petersburg city limits. Lealman Intermediate School was founded in 2005 and replaced the 28th Street Drive-In Theater in Lealman.

== Specialized learning ==
The school is located in one of the poorest areas of Pinellas County, and as of 2006, had over 100 registered sex offenders living within a mile of the school, the most in the district.

It was created to help students who have low FCAT scores or grades to achieve more in education. It has specialized help that is different from normal schools, in that the classes contain only 18 students. This is designed to help students concentrate more on learning than on other people in the class.

== Grades ==
Lealman Intermediate currently provides education for grades 5, 6, 7, 8 and 8.5. 8.5th grade was added in the school year 2007–2008. It is a mixture of 8th and 9th grade which helps students who failed 8th grade, or any other grade, get back on track. In the first half of the school year students repeat 8th grade. Then, they are required to take an exam. Those who pass the exam move to 9th grade for the rest of the year. Students who fail continue to take 8th grade.

== Periods ==
Lealman Intermediate School has eight periods a day. Class lengths are extended compared to a normal school to provide more time to specialise in core subjects such as Mathematics and Reading. 6th, 7th, and 8th grade follow an A day and B day plan. Students are rather assigned a science class or a Social Science/Geography class during one of these days. The plan alternates every day. At the start of the 2019 school year, at the direction of the Pinellas County school board, this method was changed and became a more intensive four period day, for a longer class time, related daily. This enables students to earn the credit in that subject in just half a school year. This methodology is still in the testing stage.

== Enrichment ==
Lealman Intermediate has electives renamed as PE, art, Microsoft, culinary education, basic construction, and building and health. During the 2008–2009 school year, Personal Development and Dance enrichments were removed and replaced by another stage of PE. Normally depending on what grade they are in, students tend to take all of these enrichments in one year or take half of them one grade and half of them the next grade. The enrichments are divided into six- and twelve-week periods.
