= Bayside High School (Clearwater, Florida) =

Coordinates: 27.9029°N 82.7°W

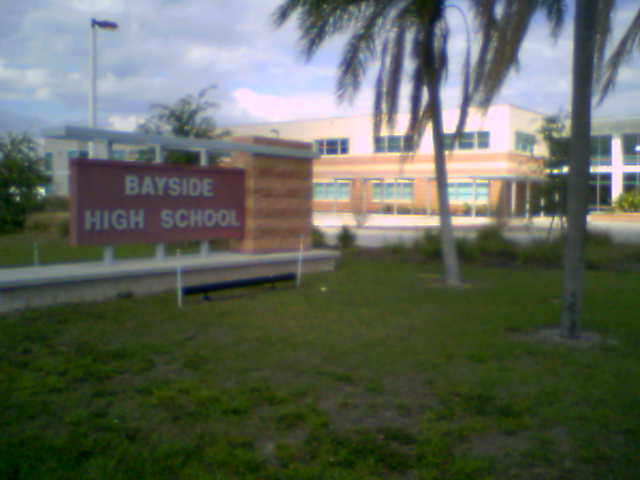
- The sign in front of Bayside High School
- 14405 49 St N Clearwater, FL 33762; United States

Information
- Type: Public alternative secondary school
- Motto: SOAR to Success; Stay Motivated; Opt for Honesty; Act Responsible; Respect Self and Others
- Established: 2004
- School district: Pinellas County Schools
- Principal: Konrad McCree
- Teaching staff: 18.00 (FTE)
- Grades: 9–12
- Enrollment: 170 (2023–2024)
- Student to teacher ratio: 9.44
- Campus size: 12 acres (49,000 m^{2})
- Campus type: Suburban
- Colors: Burgundy and silver
- Mascot: Eagle
- Website: bayside-hs.pcsb.org

Bayside High School is a public alternative secondary school in Clearwater, Florida, United States. The school is the first long-term alternative school in the Pinellas County School District and is a member of the Southern Association of Colleges and Schools.

== History ==
In 1997, Pinellas County School Board members committed to building an alternative high school. Locating the campus on property already owned by the School Board near 58 St N and 150 Ave N, in Clearwater, was proposed, but residents complained about having the at-risk students in their neighborhood. The School Board purchased the current site for $2,400,000 after voters approved a referendum in November, 2002, and work began during Fall, 2003.

The school opened in the Fall semester of 2004.

== Campus ==
Bayside High School is located on 12 acres (49,000 m^{2}) of land at 14405 49 St N, in Clearwater, FL, across the street from the Pinellas County Jail. The 90,000-square-foot (8,400 m^{2}) school building houses a reception area with nearly 30 feet (9.1 m) high ceilings and floor-to-ceiling windows. Visual and performing arts studios are also located there. The school utilizes 65 surveillance cameras. Dr. Konrad McCree, Jr became the principal in July 2021 replacing Dr. Dawn Coffin who retired.

== Students ==
As of 2005–06, Bayside High School enrolled 376 students. The schools is a dropout prevention school, and student apply and are accepted most usually for credit recovery, or because they need to be in a smaller school. The graduation rate as of 2021 was nearly 80%. The school currently serves students in grades 9–12.

== Curriculum ==
Bayside High School schedules four classes per day; many other high schools in Pinellas County have seven. The maximum class size is 22 students but has been known to exceed 30 students for certain classes needed for graduation, such as mathematics.

Bayside offers the a standard 18 credit diploma, which allows students to earn a state certified diploma and attend a college or trade school. Recently (2019), Bayside High School has begun adding a trades certification option for students to graduate with a diploma and a certification in a trade.

== School accountability ==
The Florida Department of Education assigned the grade A to Bayside High School for the 2004–2005 school year, the grade A for the 2005–2006 school year, and the grade A for the 2006–2007 school year.
