= Mike Gruttadauria =

American football player (born 1972)

No. 60
- Position: Center

Personal information
- Born: December 6, 1972 (age 53); Fort Lauderdale, Florida, U.S.
- Listed height: 6 ft 3 in (1.91 m)
- Listed weight: 280 lb (127 kg)

Career information
- High school: Tarpon Springs (FL)
- College: UCF
- NFL draft: 1995: undrafted

Career history
- Dallas Cowboys (1995)*; St. Louis Rams (1996–1999); Arizona Cardinals (2000–2002)
- * Offseason or practice squad member only

Awards and highlights
- Super Bowl champion (XXXIV)

Career NFL statistics
- Games played: 81
- Games started: 66
- Fumble recoveries: 2
- Stats at Pro Football Reference

Michael Jason Gruttadauria (born December 6, 1972) is an American former professional football player who was a center in the National Football League (NFL) for the St. Louis Rams and Arizona Cardinals. He played college football for the UCF Knights.

== Early life ==
In his younger years, his family moved between Las Vegas, South Jersey and Fort Lauderlade. He attended Tarpon Springs High School, where he began to play organized football. He initially accepted a half football scholarship from the University of Central Florida, where he became a four-year starter and is recognized as the greatest center in school history.

In 2004, he was named to the Orlando Sentinel's 25th Anniversary University of Central Florida Football Team. He also was inducted into UCF Athletics Hall of Fame.

== Professional career ==
=== Dallas Cowboys ===
Gruttadauria was signed as an undrafted free agent by the Dallas Cowboys in 1995, after not being selected in the NFL draft because he was considered to be too small to play at the professional level. On August 22, he was released along with the entire practice squad when the team signed Deion Sanders and the Cowboys didn't have enough salary cap room to keep the players.

=== St. Louis Rams ===
In 1996, Gruttadauria was signed as a free agent by the St. Louis Rams after being out of football for a year, and was named the starting center for the last 3 games of the season. Though he entered each year with the Rams as the starter, injuries and knee surgeries limited his starts.

Gruttadauria was injured through most of the 1998 season but returned strong in 1999, starting all 16 games for the Super Bowl-winning team. That year in the playoffs, with Kurt Warner at quarterback, St. Louis led the NFL with 526 points (32.9 points/game) and finished with a 13-3 won-lost mark, best in the NFC West division. In the divisional round, the Rams beat the Minnesota Vikings, amassing 374 net passing yards thanks to excellent pass protection, despite 2 sacks for 17 yards lost. Gruttadauria with guards Tom Nütten and Adam Timmerman as well as tackles Orlando Pace and Fred Miller continued to protect Warner effectively in the NFC championship game, squeezing past the excellent defense of the Tampa Bay Buccaneers 11-6. Though pitted against Warren Sapp and Brad Culpepper at defensive tackle, Gruttadauria and the rest of the line did not allow a sack and gained 258 net passing yards. In Super Bowl XXXIV, the Rams won another squeaker against the Tennessee Titans 23-16, with 407 net passing yards (1 sack for 7 yards lost) and a mere 29 rushing yards. Some of the success of that team was due to the strategy of the center occasionally snapping the ball very quickly back to Warner, catching the opposing defensive line off-guard.

=== Arizona Cardinals ===
On February 19, 2000, Gruttadauria signed as a free agent with the Arizona Cardinals. The next year, he was awarded the Ed Block Courage Award. Because of injuries, he played only half the year in 2000 and 2002, his final year in 2001, though he played 15 games. He was released on April 2, 2003.
