= Dexter McCluster =

American football player (born 1988)

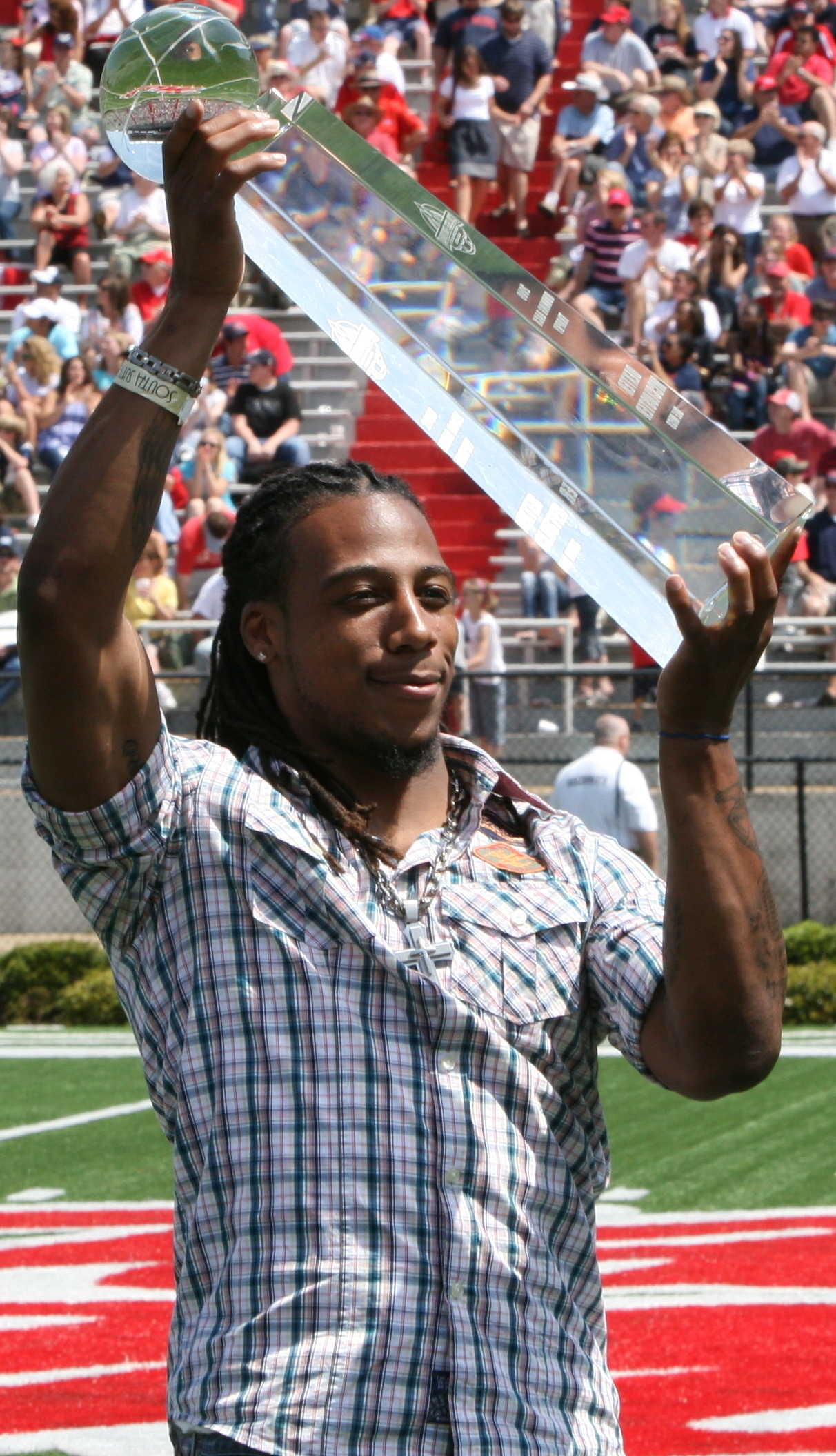
- McCluster at the 2010 Ole Miss spring game

No. 22, 33
- Position: Running back

Personal information
- Born: August 25, 1988 (age 38); Largo, Florida, U.S.
- Listed height: 5 ft 8 in (1.73 m)
- Listed weight: 170 lb (77 kg)

Career information
- High school: Largo
- College: Ole Miss (2006–2009)
- NFL draft: 2010: 2nd round, 36th overall pick

Career history
- Kansas City Chiefs (2010–2013); Tennessee Titans (2014–2015); San Diego Chargers (2016); Toronto Argonauts (2018); Massachusetts Pirates (2019)

Awards and highlights
- Second-team All-Pro (2013) (Note: Selected as a Return Specialist); Pro Bowl (2013); NFL punt return yards leader (2013); Third-team All-American (2009); First-team All-SEC (2009); Second-team All-SEC (2008)

Career NFL statistics
- Rushing attempts: 250
- Rushing yards: 1,042
- Receptions: 236
- Receiving yards: 1,993
- Return yards: 2,942
- Total touchdowns: 12
- Stats at Pro Football Reference

Dexter Marquise McCluster (born August 25, 1988) is an American former professional football player who was a running back and return specialist in the National Football League (NFL) for the Kansas City Chiefs, Tennessee Titans, and San Diego Chargers. He played college football for the Ole Miss Rebels. McCluster was selected by the Chiefs in the second round of the 2010 NFL draft. He also played for the Toronto Argonauts of the Canadian Football League (CFL) and the Massachusetts Pirates of the National Arena League (NAL).

== Early life ==
McCluster attended Largo High School in Largo, Florida where he was an honor roll student and where he lettered in football, basketball and track. He was a state qualifier in the long jump and in the high jump. In football, his junior season, he rushed for 1,424 yards and 14 touchdowns. As a senior in leading the Largo Packers to the 2005 District Championship, he rushed for 2,490 yards and 39 touchdowns. Also as a senior, he was named to the First-team All-State 5A by the Florida Sports Writers Association and named All-Suncoast Player of the Year by the St. Petersburg Times Mr.2000. McCluster was selected Most Valuable Player in the Florida Athletic Coaches Association North-South Football All- Star Classic game.

In track & field, McCluster was a state qualifier in the jumping events. He got personal-best leaps of 6.94 meters in the long jump and 1.99 meters in the high jump. In the sprinting events, he recorded times of 11.53 seconds in the 100 meters and 22.67 seconds in the 200 meters.

== College career ==
As a true freshman at the University of Mississippi in 2006, McCluster started five of the first six games before suffering an injury. He finished the season with 15 receptions for 232 receiving yards, 68 rushing yards on eight attempts and two touchdowns. As a sophomore in 2007 he played in the final eight games of the year after missing the first four due to the injury. He finished with 326 yards on 27 receptions and 63 yards on 6 rushing attempts with two touchdowns. As a junior in 2008 he earned second-team All-SEC honors from the Associated Press after rushing for 655 yards on 109 attempts and 44 receptions for 625 yards with seven touchdowns.

McCluster's senior season was full of highlights as he set two school records against Tennessee for rushing yards in a game with 282 and all-purpose yards in a game with 324. In his final game in Vaught-Hemingway Stadium, he ran for 148 yards and threw the only collegiate touchdown pass of his career in the 25-23 win over then 9th-ranked LSU. He rushed for 1,169 yards on 181 attempts (a 6.4 yards per carry average), and made 44 receptions for 520 yards with 12 total touchdowns that made him the only player in SEC history to rush for over 1,000 yards and receive for 500 yards in a single season. He finished his college career at Ole Miss with 3,685 yards from scrimmage and 23 TD's.

=== College statistics ===
Season	Team	GP	Rushing				Receiving			
Season	Team	GP	Att	Yds	Avg	TD	Rec	Yds	Avg	TD
2006	Ole Miss	6	8	68	8.5	1	15	232	15.5	1
2007	Ole Miss	8	6	63	10.5	0	27	326	12.1	2
2008	Ole Miss	13	109	655	6.0	6	44	625	14.2	1
2009	Ole Miss	13	181	1,169	6.5	8	44	520	11.8	3
Career		40	304	1,955	6.4	15	130	1,703	13.1	7

== Professional career ==
=== Pre-draft ===
According to CBSSports.com, McCluster was projected to be drafted in the second round of the 2010 NFL draft.

Pre-draft measurables
Height	Weight	Arm length	Hand span	40-yard dash	10-yard split	20-yard split	20-yard shuttle	Three-cone drill	Vertical jump	Broad jump	Bench press	Wonderlic
5 ft 8 3/4 in (1.75 m)	172 lb (78 kg)	29 1/4 in (0.74 m)	8 3/8 in (0.21 m)	4.58 s	1.61 s	2.75 s	4.06 s	6.73 s	37.5 in (0.95 m)	9 ft 10 in (3.00 m)	20 reps	18
All values from NFL Combine/3-cone from Pro Day.

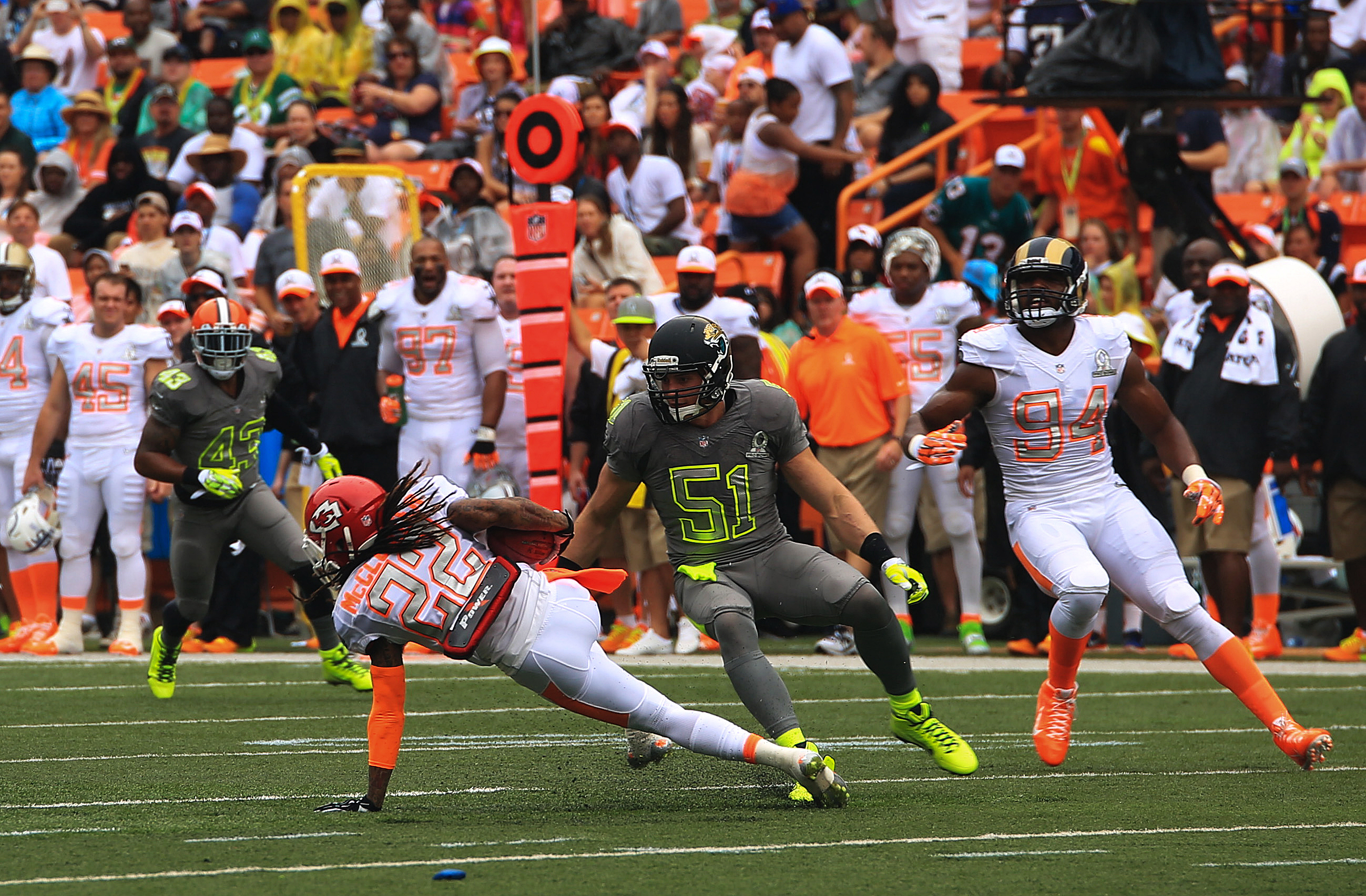
McCluster (#22) at the 2014 Pro Bowl

=== Kansas City Chiefs ===
On April 23, McCluster was selected 36th overall by the Kansas City Chiefs in the second round of the 2010 NFL Draft. He signed a $5.15 million, 4-year contract with the Chiefs on July 28, 2010. McCluster scored his first NFL touchdown in his professional debut (the first game of the 2010 Chiefs season) on a 94-yard punt return on September 13, 2010, against the San Diego Chargers. With this score, McCluster became the youngest Chiefs player to score a touchdown in franchise history (21 years and 19 days old), a record that still stands as of the end of the 2023 season. The record was previously held by Tamarick Vanover, who scored a 99-yard kickoff return touchdown in week 1 of the 1995 season vs. the Seattle Seahawks. Vanover was 21 years and 190 days old on the day of his first career touchdown, 171 days older than McCluster was when Vanover's record was broken. The 94-yard score was also the longest punt return touchdown in Chiefs history until January 1, 2017, when Tyreek Hill returned a punt for 95 yards against the San Diego Chargers.

On September 26, 2010, 13 days after his debut, McCluster caught a 31-yard pass from Matt Cassel, giving the rookie running back his first career offensive touchdown. As a result, McCluster is both the youngest and second-youngest Chiefs player to score a touchdown.

On January 1, 2012, in the Chiefs' season finale against the Denver Broncos, McCluster scored his first NFL rushing touchdown on a 21-yard run in the first quarter. This proved to be the only touchdown of the day for either team, as the game ended in a 7-3 Chiefs victory.

=== Tennessee Titans ===
On March 11, 2014, McCluster signed a three-year, $12 million contract to join the Tennessee Titans. The Titans waived McCluster on September 2, 2016.

=== San Diego Chargers ===
McCluster was signed to the San Diego Chargers on September 20, 2016. He was placed on the Reserve/Non Football Injury list with a fractured forearm.

=== Toronto Argonauts ===
On July 16, 2018, McCluster signed with the Toronto Argonauts of the Canadian Football League. He made his debut on September 28, 2018, and recorded 4 rushes for 27 yards, 6 catches for 46 yards, and handled return duties on special teams. McCluster played in four games for the Argos during the 2018 season, and produced 117 yards on 22 carries, 111 yards on 12 catches, one punt return for six yards, and two kickoffs for 40 yards. He was released by the Argos on May 6, 2019.

=== Massachusetts Pirates ===
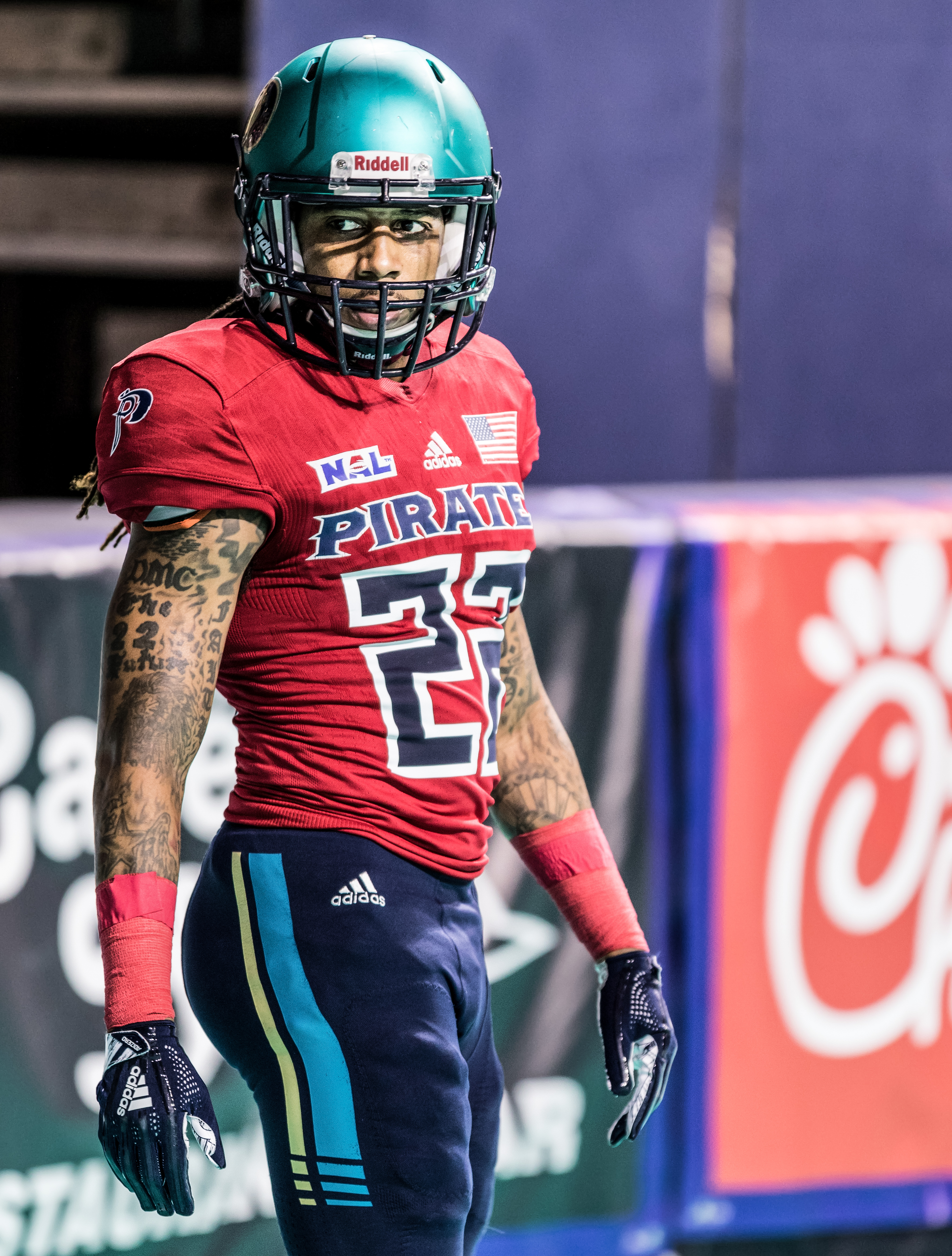
McCluster with the Massachusetts Pirates in 2019

On May 15, 2019, McCluster signed with the Massachusetts Pirates of the National Arena League. McCluster appeared in 6 games while recording 19 receptions for 159 yards and 2 receiving touchdowns.
