= Eric Hanhold =

American baseball player (born 1993)

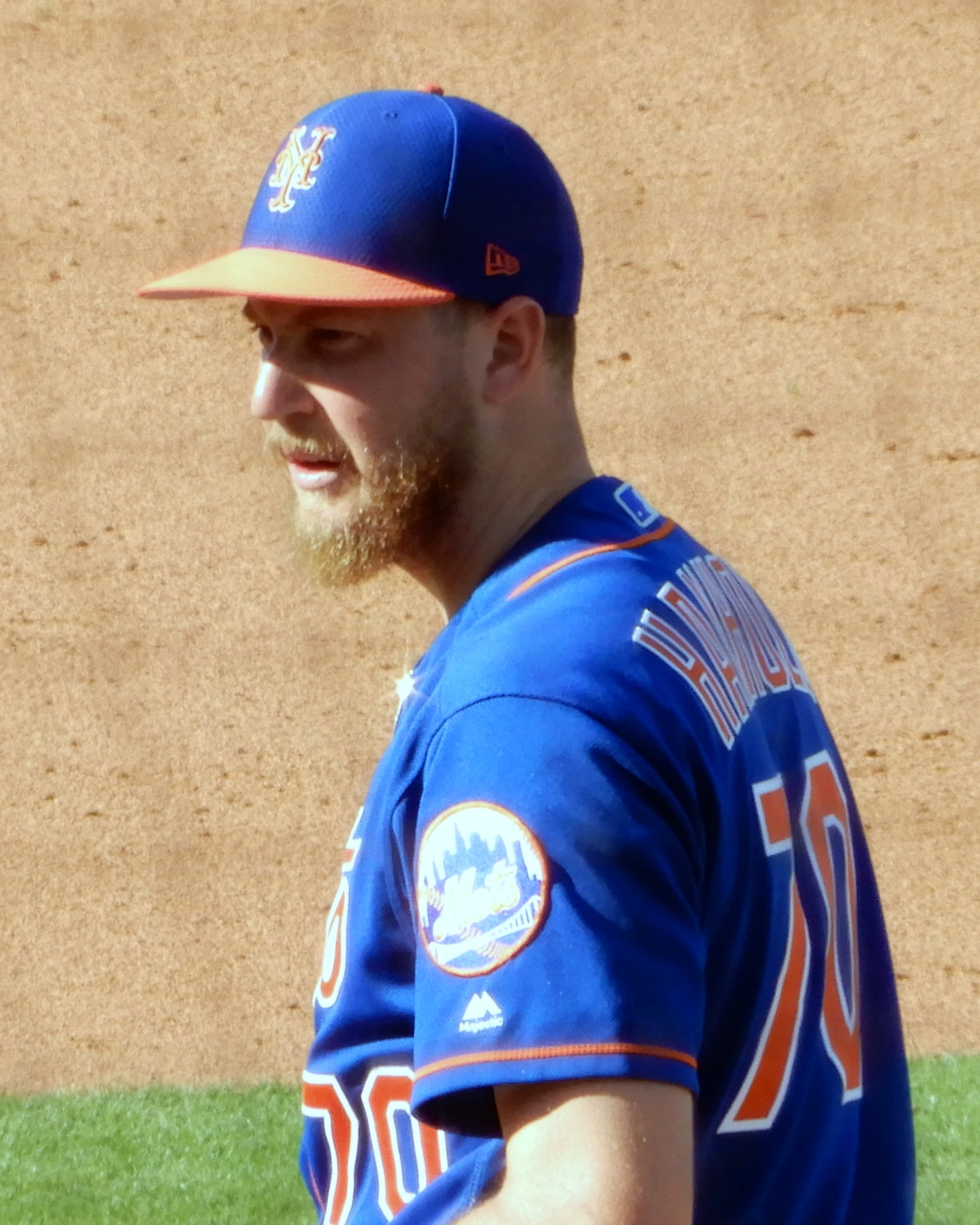
- Hanhold with the New York Mets in 2019
- Pitcher
- Born: November 1, 1993 (age 33); Bartlett, Tennessee, U.S.
- Batted: Right Threw: Right

MLB debut
- September 4, 2018, for the New York Mets

Last MLB appearance
- October 3, 2021, for the Baltimore Orioles

MLB statistics
- Win–loss record: 0–0
- Earned run average: 7.11
- Strikeouts: 8
- Stats at Baseball Reference

Teams
- New York Mets (2018); Baltimore Orioles (2021)

Eric Dru Hanhold (born November 1, 1993) is an American former professional baseball pitcher. He played in Major League Baseball (MLB) for the New York Mets and Baltimore Orioles.

== Amateur career ==
Hanhold attended East Lake High School in Tarpon Springs, Florida. He committed to play college baseball at the University of Florida before his senior season. As a senior, he was 7–3 with a 1.14 ERA. He was drafted by the Philadelphia Phillies in the 40th round of the 2012 Major League Baseball draft, but did not sign and instead enrolled at the University of Florida, where he majored in criminology. In 2014, he played collegiate summer baseball with the Orleans Firebirds of the Cape Cod Baseball League. As a junior at Florida, Hanhold was 1–0 with a 4.26 ERA in 25 1/3innings pitched, making four starts and ten relief appearances.

== Professional career ==
=== Milwaukee Brewers ===
After Hanhold's junior year, he was drafted by the Milwaukee Brewers in the sixth round of the 2015 Major League Baseball draft, and he signed for $250,000.

After signing, Hanhold made his professional debut with the Arizona League Brewers, and after one game, he was promoted to the Wisconsin Timber Rattlers where he finished the season with an 0–4 record and a 7.60 ERA in ten games (seven starts). In 2016, he played for the Brevard County Manatees where he was 2–12 with a 4.81 ERA in 19 starts, and in 2017, he pitched with the Carolina Mudcats, posting an 8–3 record and a 3.94 ERA in 64 innings pitched, mainly in relief.

=== New York Mets ===
On September 12, 2017, Hanhold was traded to the New York Mets as the player to be named later in the Neil Walker trade that took place in August. He began 2018 with the Binghamton Rumble Ponies and after posting a 3–1 record and a 2.84 ERA in 17 relief appearances he was promoted to the Las Vegas 51s.

Hanhold was promoted to the Major Leagues on September 1, 2018. He made his Major League debut on September 4 at Dodger Stadium against the Los Angeles Dodgers, pitching 1 1/3 innings scoreless innings of relief, allowing one hit, one walk, and a hit by pitch, as well as recording one strikeout.

=== Baltimore Orioles ===
On September 16, 2019, Hanhold was claimed off waivers by the Baltimore Orioles. Hanhold was designated for assignment on January 7, 2020, and outrighted on January 13. On September 12, 2021, the Orioles selected his contract from the Triple-A Norfolk Tides. Hanhold made 10 appearances for the Orioles, posting a 6.97 ERA with 6 strikeouts.

=== Pittsburgh Pirates ===
On November 3, 2021, Hanhold was claimed off of waivers by the Pittsburgh Pirates. On March 18, 2022, Hanhold was designated for assignment by the Pirates. On March 21, Hanhold cleared waivers and was sent outright to the Triple-A Indianapolis Indians.

He elected free agency on October 6, 2022.

=== San Diego Padres ===
On December 15, 2022, Hanhold signed a minor league contract with the San Diego Padres. He spent the 2023 season with the Triple–A El Paso Chihuahuas, making 50 relief outings and struggling to an 8.44 ERA with 61 strikeouts across 53 1/3 innings pitched. Hanhold elected free agency following the season on November 6, 2023.

=== Lake Country DockHounds ===
On May 27, 2024, Hanhold signed with the Lake Country DockHounds of the American Association of Professional Baseball. He made 8 appearances out of the bullpen, registering a 2.70 ERA with 7 strikeouts over 6 2/3 innings. On June 26, Hanhold was released by the DockHounds.
