= Bank of America Plaza (Tampa) =

42-story skyscraper located in Downtown Tampa

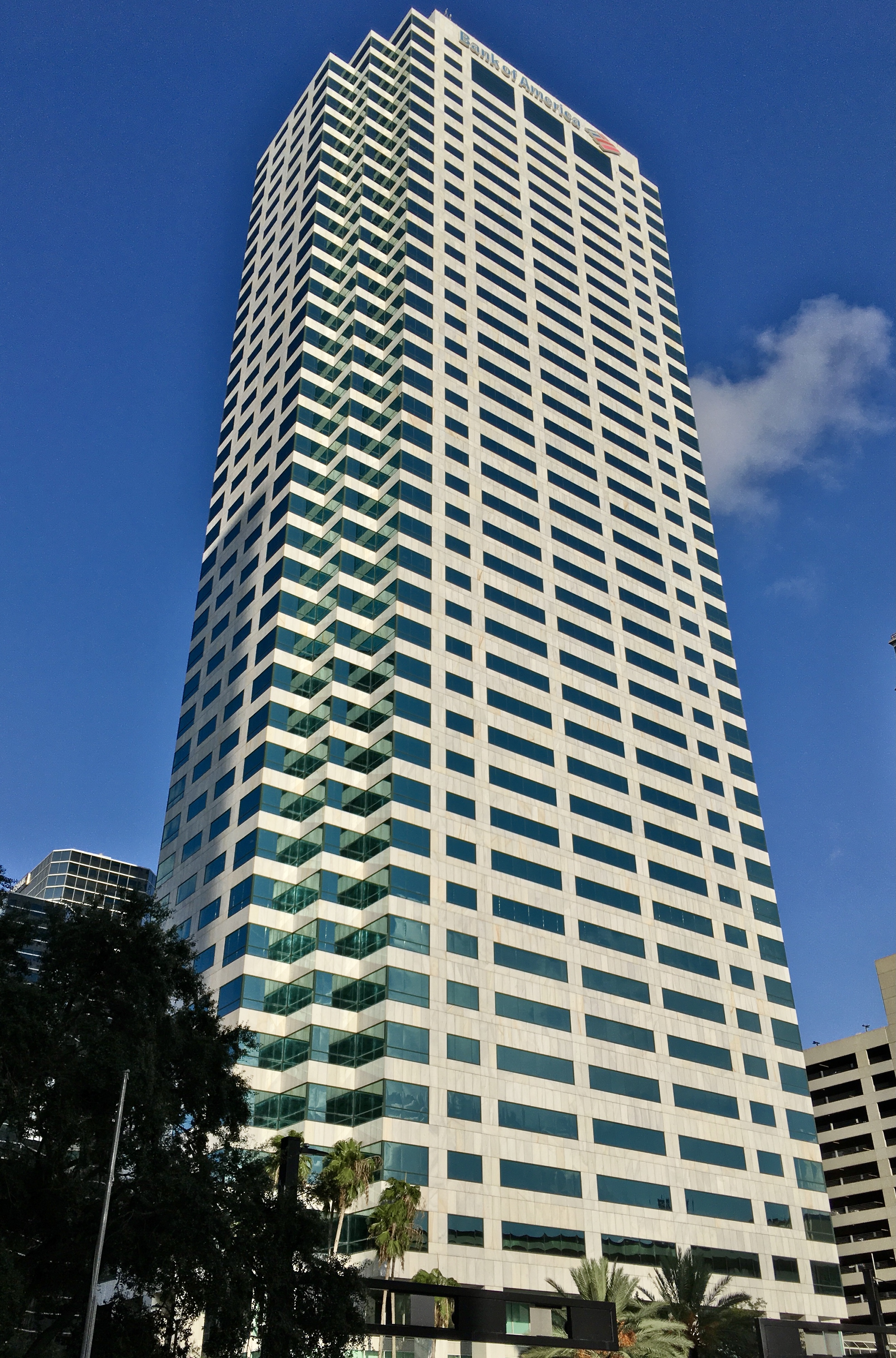
- The Bank of America Plaza in 2021
- Former names: Barnett Plaza
- Alternative names: 101 Kennedy Boulevard

General information
- Type: Commercial offices
- Location: 101 East Kennedy Boulevard; Tampa, Florida, U.S.
- Coordinates: 27.94660°N 82.45928°W
- Completed: 1986
- Owner: Oaktree Capital Management and Banyan Street Capital
- Operator: Banyan Street Capital

Height
- Roof: 175.87 m (577.0 ft)

Technical details
- Floor count: 42
- Floor area: 20,000 sq ft (1,900 m^{2})per floor, 783,930 rsf total

Design and construction
- Architects: HKS, Inc. Odell Associates
- Developer: Paragon Group

Website
- boaplazatampa.com

The Bank of America Plaza is a 42-story skyscraper located in Downtown Tampa, in the U.S. state of Florida, and was completed in 1986. At 175.87 m (577.0 ft), it surpassed One Tampa City Center as the tallest building in Tampa, until completion of 100 North Tampa in 1992. The structure was originally known as Barnett Plaza. The structure contains around 20,000 square feet (1,900 m^{2}) of rentable space per typical floor with a total of 783,930 square feet (72,829 m^{2}) of rentable space.

== Plane incident ==
On January 5, 2002, about four months after the September 11, 2001, terrorist attacks, a 15-year-old amateur pilot, Charles Bishop, stole a Cessna 172 plane and flew it into the Bank of America building. While it killed him, there were no other injuries (because the crash was on a Saturday, when few people were in the building). A suicide note found in the wreckage expressed support for Osama bin Laden. Bishop had been taking prescription medicine for acne called Accutane that may have had the side effect of depression or severe psychosis. His family later sued Hoffman-La Roche, the company that makes Accutane, for $70 million; however, an autopsy found no traces of the drug in the teenager's system.

Records
| Preceded by One Tampa City Center | Tallest Building in Tampa; 1986–1992; 176m | Succeeded by 100 North Tampa |
