= 2002 Tampa Cessna 172 crash =

Intentional aircraft crash

Coordinates: 27.947°N 82.459°W

2002 Tampa airplane crash
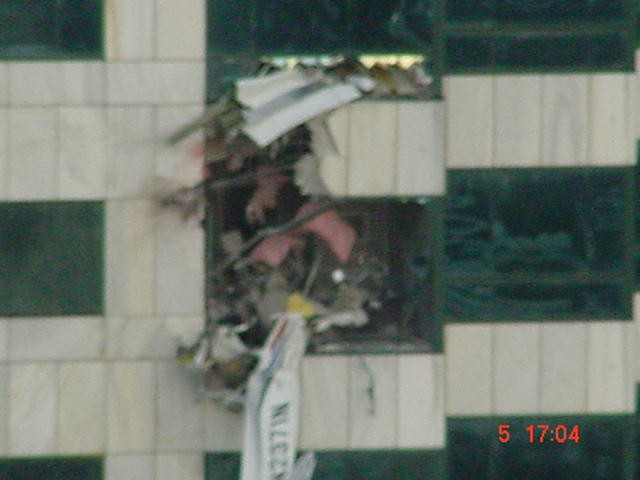
- The plane's wreckage on side of the building in Tampa, Florida.

Incident
- Date: January 5, 2002; 24 years ago
- Summary: Airplane theft and suicide by pilot
- Site: Tampa, Florida, United States
- Total fatalities: 1
- Total injuries: 0
- Total survivors: 0

Aircraft
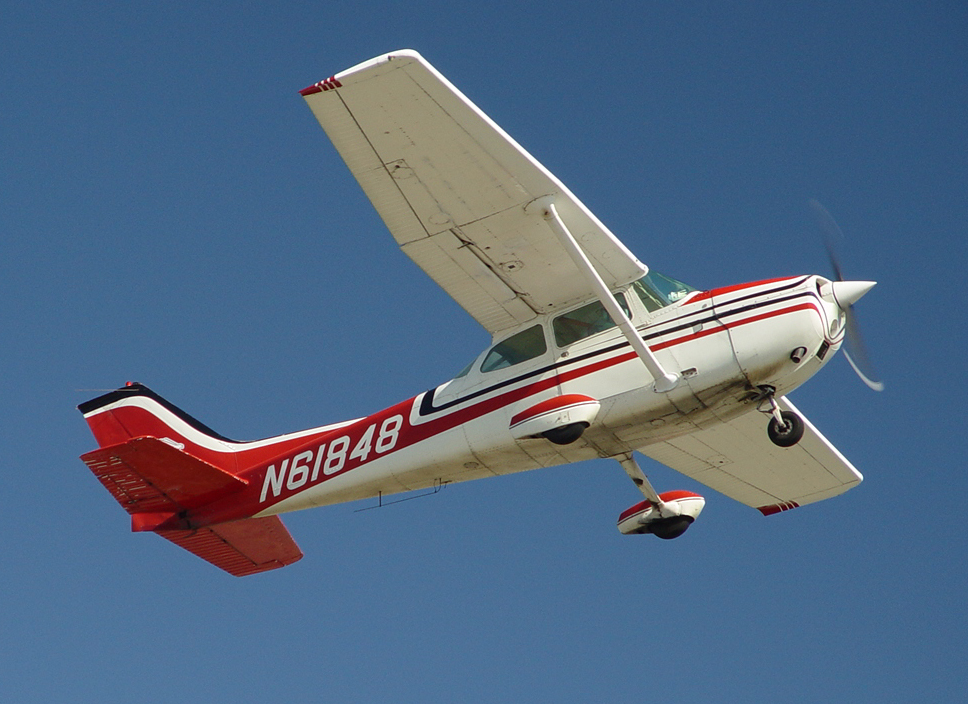
- A Cessna 172 similar to the aircraft involved
- Aircraft type: Cessna 172
- Operator: Privately owned
- Registration: N2371N
- Flight origin: St. Pete–Clearwater International Airport, Florida, United States
- Destination: Tampa, Florida
- Occupants: 1, Charles J. Bishop
- Fatalities: 1
- Injuries: 0
- Missing: 0
- Survivors: 0

On January 5, 2002, Charles J. Bishop, a 15-year-old student pilot, stole a Cessna 172 light aircraft and crashed it into the side of the Bank of America Tower in downtown Tampa, Florida, United States. The impact killed the teenager and damaged an office room, but there were no other injuries.

Bishop had been inspired by the September 11 attacks; he had left a suicide note crediting Osama bin Laden for the attacks and praising it as a justified response to actions against the Palestinians and Iraqis and said he (Bishop) was acting on behalf of Al Qaeda, from whom he had turned down help. As officials could find no other evidence of any connections, terrorism as a motive was ruled out, and they suggested that the crash was an apparent suicide. Bishop's mother filed and later dropped a lawsuit claiming that psychological side effects from the medication isotretinoin, sold under the name Accutane, caused the incident.

== Background ==
Charles John Bishara, Jr., was born on February 8, 1986, to parents Julia Detore and Charles Bishara. Before their son was born, in 1984, the couple had attempted to elope, but their application for a marriage license was denied, Detore being only 17 at the time. They then attempted a suicide pact at Detore's home in Malden, Massachusetts, during which Bishara was stabbed by Detore but survived. Detore and Bishara successfully married one month after their son was born, but divorced eight months later, with Detore alleging "cruel and abusive treatment". Detore retained custody of her son and changed both of their surnames to Bishop in the early 1990s, as Bishara was of Syrian descent and she wished to avoid discrimination against Arab Americans during the Gulf War. The Bishops moved to the Atlanta area around 1996, then to Tampa in 1998.

At the time of the incident, Charles Bishop lived in Tarpon Springs, Florida and attended East Lake High School. He took his first flight lessons at the age of 12 in 1998. Beginning in February 2001, he attended them more regularly, once or twice per month, and had accumulated 19.3 total hours of dual instructional flight time at the time of the incident. Bishop paid for the lessons by performing chores for the flight school, National Aviation Holdings Inc., such as washing and cleaning airplanes.

== Flight ==
On January 5, 2002, Bishop arrived at St. Pete–Clearwater International Airport for another flight lesson just as his instructor was finishing up with another student. The instructor told Bishop to carry out the preflight inspection on his Cessna alone while waiting for the instructor to be done. Unsupervised, Bishop untied the airplane and taxied to runway 35R, taking off without permission at 4:51 p.m. EST. Air traffic controllers did not attempt to contact Bishop, believing it to be futile to do so in the event of a stolen plane. During takeoff, Bishop came close to Southwest Airlines Flight 2229 as it took off from Tampa International Airport, forcing the larger plane to change its heading to avoid a collision.

As soon as the plane took off, the air traffic controllers alerted the United States Coast Guard. Bishop flew southeast to MacDill Air Force Base, where he overflew the control tower by just a few feet. A Coast Guard helicopter approached the Cessna as it flew north from MacDill toward downtown Tampa. Bishop did not respond to radio communications, so the helicopter crew attempted to communicate with Bishop through hand gestures, directing him to land at nearby Peter O. Knight Airport. Bishop responded with hand gestures of his own, but the crew could not determine what he was indicating. Shortly thereafter, at 5:03 p.m. EST, the Cessna crashed into the Bank of America Tower, making impact between the 28th and 29th floors of the 42-story building. Bishop was killed instantly.

The two floors impacted were occupied by a local law firm, Shumaker, Loop & Kendrick. As it was a Saturday afternoon, only two people were on the 28th floor at the time, an attorney named Monica Lothrop and her husband, Brian, neither of whom was injured. Approximately 40 people were in the building, all of whom were evacuated without incident. The plane destroyed the office of attorney Kevin Graham, who had planned to work late that evening, but left around 4 p.m. after becoming frustrated with his lack of progress on a legal brief. Other than Graham's unoccupied office space, the building was undamaged.

== Investigation and aftermath ==
The Federal Aviation Administration activated a ground stop for all Tampa Bay area airports at 5:10 p.m. EST, forbidding all planes from taking off until the stop was lifted at 6:05 p.m. The plane wreckage and Bishop's body were pulled into the building and recovered by authorities later that evening, due to high winds that prevented a crane from reaching the impact site.

President George W. Bush was briefly informed about the incident and two unrelated crashes that same day. White House spokesman Gordon Johndroe, as well as officials from the Pinellas County Sheriff's Office, stated that evening that the crash had no link to terrorism. However, Bishop's suicide note found in the wreckage voiced support for Osama bin Laden and claimed that he had met with representatives of al-Qaeda. Investigators could find no evidence that any such meetings ever occurred, describing the statements as delusional. The attack against Super Bowl XXXVI that Bishop predicted in his note, which resembled the plot of the 1991 best-selling novel The Sum of All Fears, did not come to pass. The note was publicly released on February 6, three days after the Super Bowl. Mistakenly dated January 5, 2001, it read in full:

I have prepared this statement in regards to the ~~terrorist~~ acts I am about to commit. First of all, Osama bin Laden is absolutely justified in the terror he has caused on 9-11. He has brought a mighty nation to its knees! God blesses him and the others who helped make September 11 happen. The U.S. will have to face the consequences for its horrific actions against the Palestinian people and Iraqis by its allegiance with the monstrous Israelis—who want nothing short of world domination! You will pay—God help you—and I will make you pay! There will be more coming! Al Qaeda and other organizations have met with me several times to discuss the option of me joining. I didn't. This is an operation done by me only. I had no other help, although, I am acting on their behalf. Osama bin Laden is planning on blowing up the Super Bowl with an antiquated nuclear bomb left over from the 1967 Israeli–Syrian war.

Julia Bishop filed a $70 million lawsuit (equivalent to $125 million in 2025) against Roche Laboratories, manufacturers of the Accutane brand of isotretinoin acne medication. Isotretinoin has been associated with depression and, in rare cases, suicidal actions, and Bishop alleged that her son was suffering these side effects when he decided to kill himself. She dropped the suit on June 26, 2007, stating that she was physically and emotionally unable to continue the action.

After the incident took place, numerous security measures were taken. The FAA released a security notice on January 6, the day after the incident. The notice included security of the aircraft and regulations pertaining to underaged flight students. In addition, the Experimental Aircraft Association and other smaller aircraft organizations proposed more security of flight schools and small aircraft.

While authorities stated that the crash was due to an "abuse of trust" rather than a security breach, others argue for the need of increased security due to the simplicity of such actions.

== See also ==
- 1945 Empire State Building B-25 crash – Aviation accident in New York City
- 2002 Pirelli Tower airplane crash – Airplane crash in Milan, Italy
- 2006 New York City Cirrus SR20 crash – Aircraft crash into a building
- 2010 Austin suicide attack – Suicide by pilot in Austin, Texas
- 2014 Wichita King Air crash – Aviation disaster in Kansas, US
- 2018 Horizon Air Q400 incident – Aircraft crash in United States
- List of terrorist incidents in 2002
