= Palm Harbor University High School =

Coordinates: 28.086374°N 82.763921°W

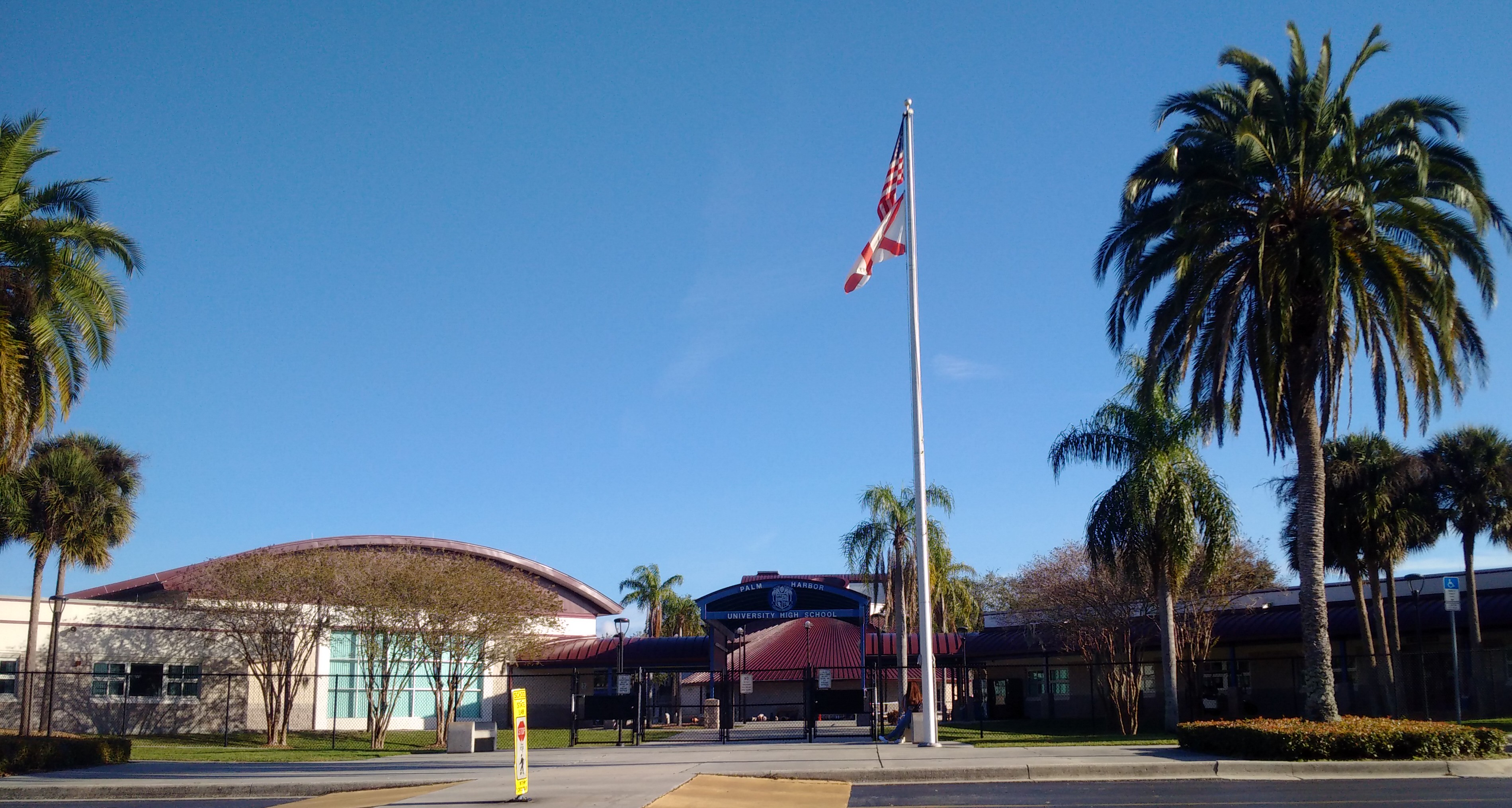

Location
- 1900 Omaha Street; Palm Harbor, Florida; United States

Information
- Former name: University High School at Palm Harbor
- Type: Public
- Motto: Passion, Purpose, and Perseverance
- Established: 1996; 30 years ago
- School district: Pinellas County Schools
- Superintendent: Kevin Hendrick
- Principal: Teresa Patterson (since 2020)
- Teaching staff: 112.00 (FTE)
- Student to teacher ratio: 22.34
- Colors: Maroon; Navy
- Mascot: Stormy the Hurricane
- Nickname: PHU; The U
- Rival: East Lake High School Tarpon Springs High School
- Yearbook: Aftermath
- Website: Palm Harbor University High School Website

Palm Harbor University High School, also known as PHUHS, is a Pinellas County public high school in Palm Harbor, Florida for grades 9–12. The school's mascot is the Hurricane and the school's colors are navy and maroon. The campus was built in 1996 and was originally to be known as the University High School at Palm Harbor. The word University emphasized the intended cooperation with the University of South Florida, but this did not materialize. In the 2014–2015 school year, the school added a biomedical focus to the existing Center for Wellness and Medical Professions (CWMP) program. Students at PHUHS belong to either the traditional program, which is called the University Program, or one of two magnet programs:

- International Baccalaureate (IB)
- Center for Wellness and Medical Professions (CWMP)
- *Career Academy of Business Administration and Management (C.A.B.A.M.)

== Academics and stats ==
In the past several years, PHUHS has ranked highly, with over 80% of the graduating class qualifying for Florida Bright Futures Scholarships and students consistently performing in the top 1% of scores for the statewide FCAT standardized test. The school has the highest graduation rate of all high schools in Pinellas County. Palm Harbor University High also received a 10 out of 10 and an A grade from greatschools.net] was named in the USA TODAY Academic All-Star Honorable Mention 2004, and won 35 athletic championships at the local, regional and state level. The high school was mentioned in the Newsweek listing of the best High Schools in the U.S. and was awarded a Silver Medal ranking in the 2008 U.S. News & World Report Best High Schools. Its International Baccalaureate program has led over 700 students to the IB diploma, and has maintained the second highest percentage of diplomas in North America within the 60 (or more) students per graduating class category. PHUHS is a recipient of Florida's Five Star Award for outstanding community involvement, and boasts a total of 47 National Merit finalists. In 2005 and 2006, Palm Harbor University was ranked the 83rd best high school in America.

== Athletics ==
Palm Harbor competes in lacrosse, baseball (boys), basketball, cheerleading, cross country, flag football (girls), American football, golf, soccer, softball (girls), swimming, tennis, track, volleyball (girls), wrestling and as of the 2023-2024 school year, bowling.

=== State championships ===
- Girls Soccer: 6× (1999, 2000, 2006, 2009, 2010, 2019)
- Girls Softball: 3× (1999, 2004, 2005)
- Boys Soccer: 3× (2002, 2006, 2009)
- Boys Swimming and Diving: 3× (2008, 2011, 2013)

== Rivalries ==
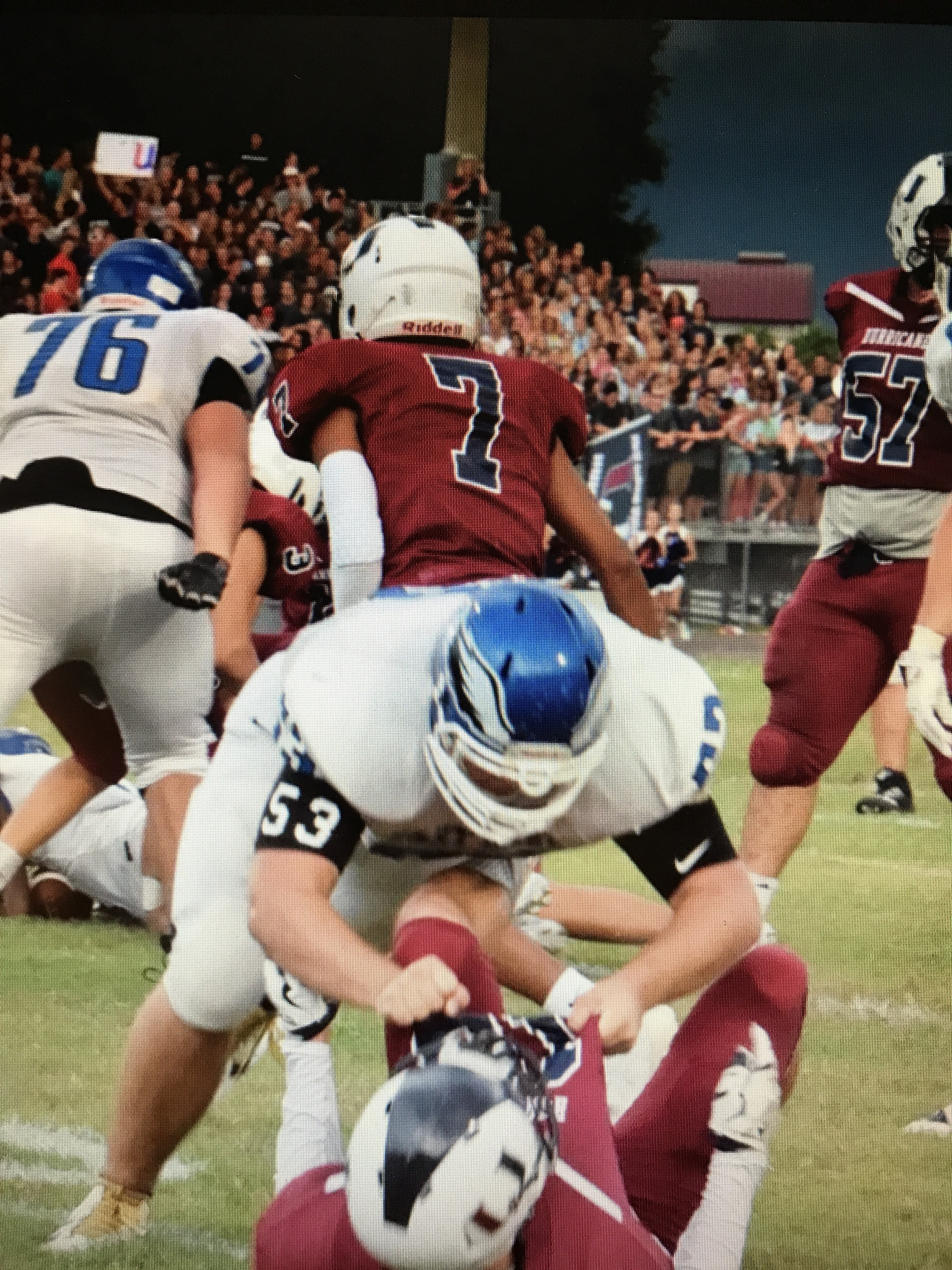
The Hurricanes taking on their cross-lake rivals the Eagles in football

In recent years, the school's football matchup with rival East Lake High School has been described by the Tampa Bay Times as "perhaps the biggest high school football game in Pinellas County".

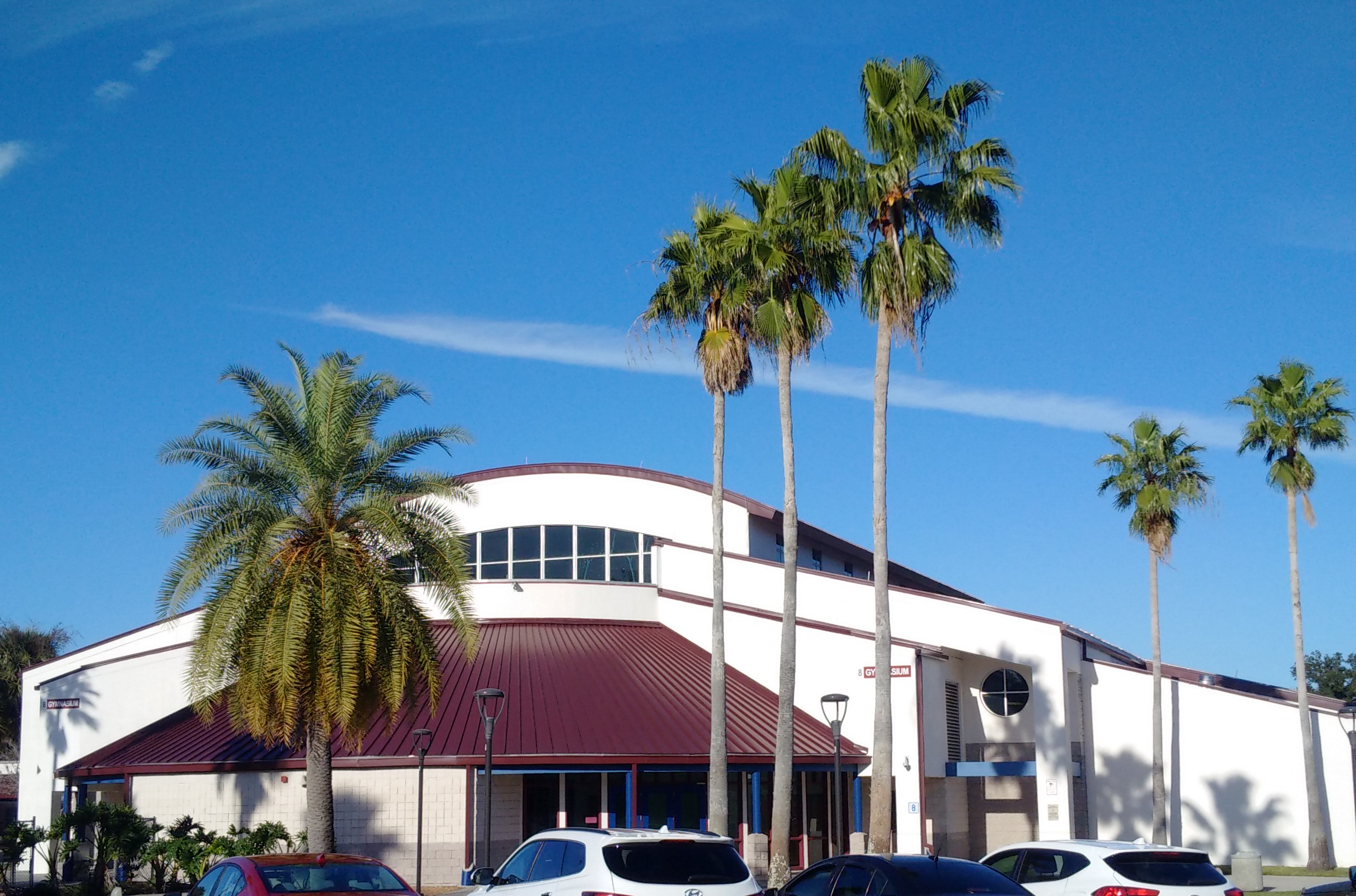
The school's Gymnasium

== Clubs and programs ==
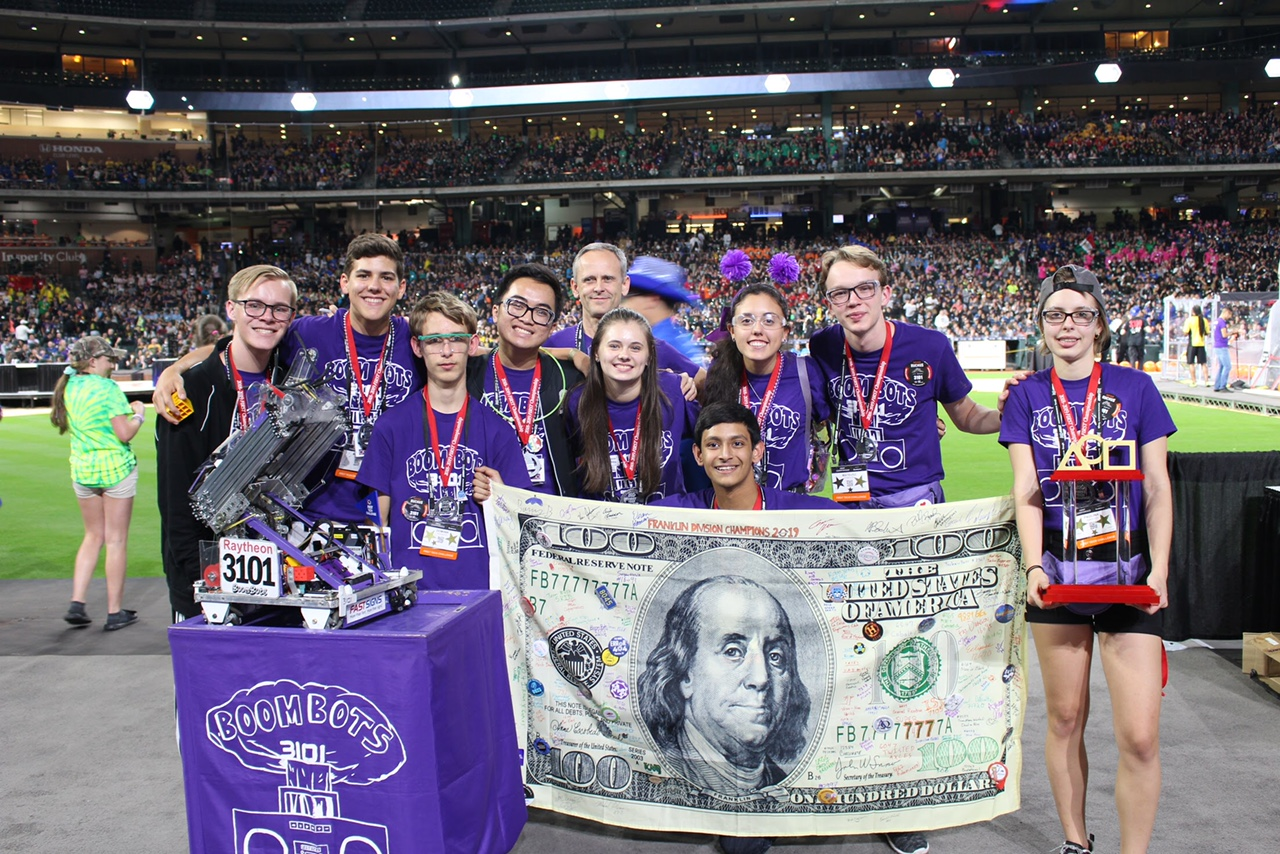
PHUHS Robotics Team #3101 Boom Bots winning 2019 Houston World Championship.

The medical program allows students to get an overview of the medical field and learn about the human body and diseases along the way. By junior year, each student is enrolled into Allied Health where students study and shadow three different medical professions throughout the year. By senior year, each student chooses to enroll into a certification class of either: a Nursing Assistant Class (CNA), an Electrocardiogram (EKG)/Telemetry Aide Class, an Emergency Medical Responders Class, or an Entry Level Biotechnology certification. Students also become CPR certified their sophomore year and get re-certified their senior years. See PHUHS's website for a complete list of clubs. The school has over 60 different clubs to partake in.

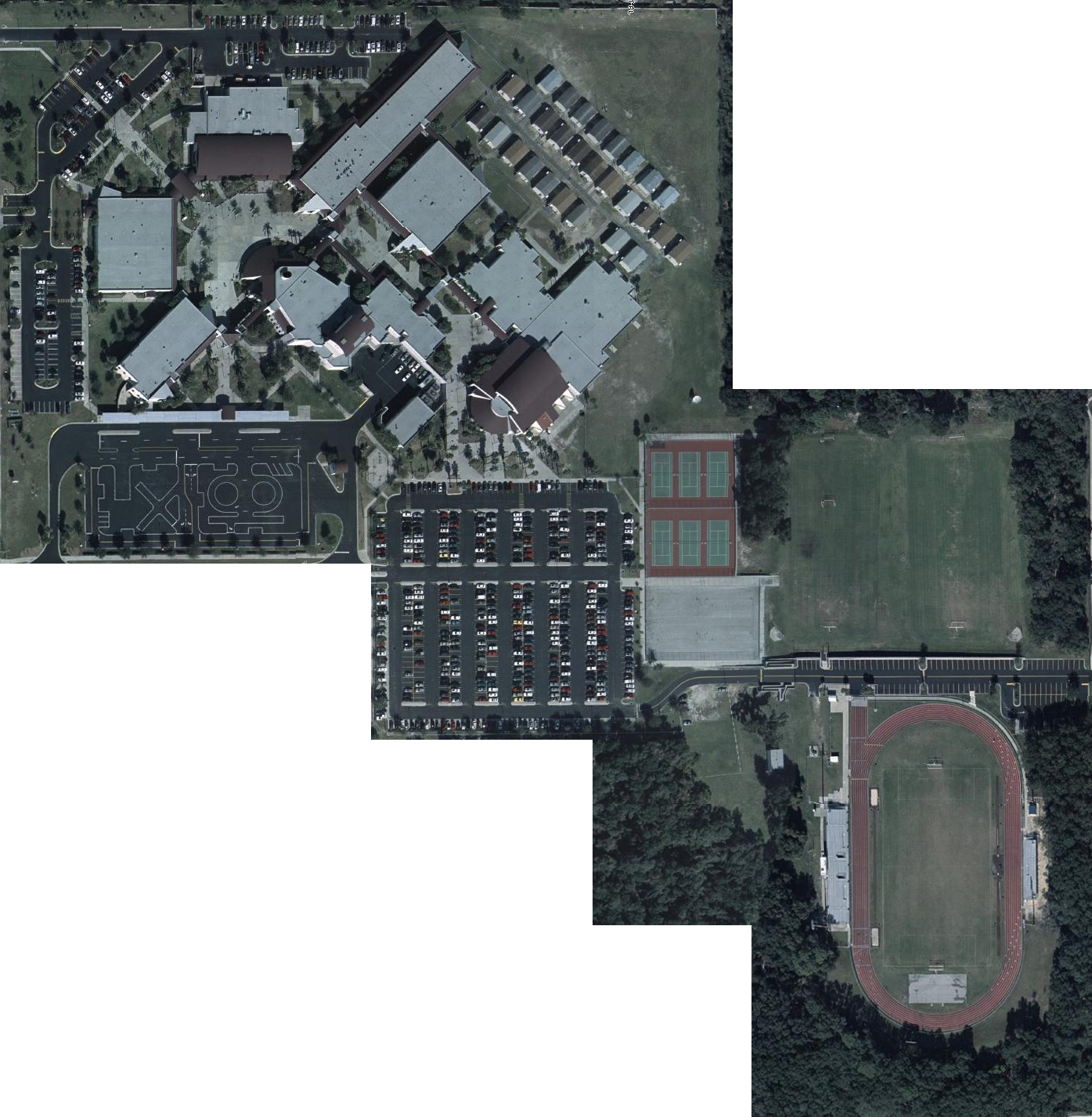
Aerial satellite imagery of Palm Harbor University High School, taken during school hours.

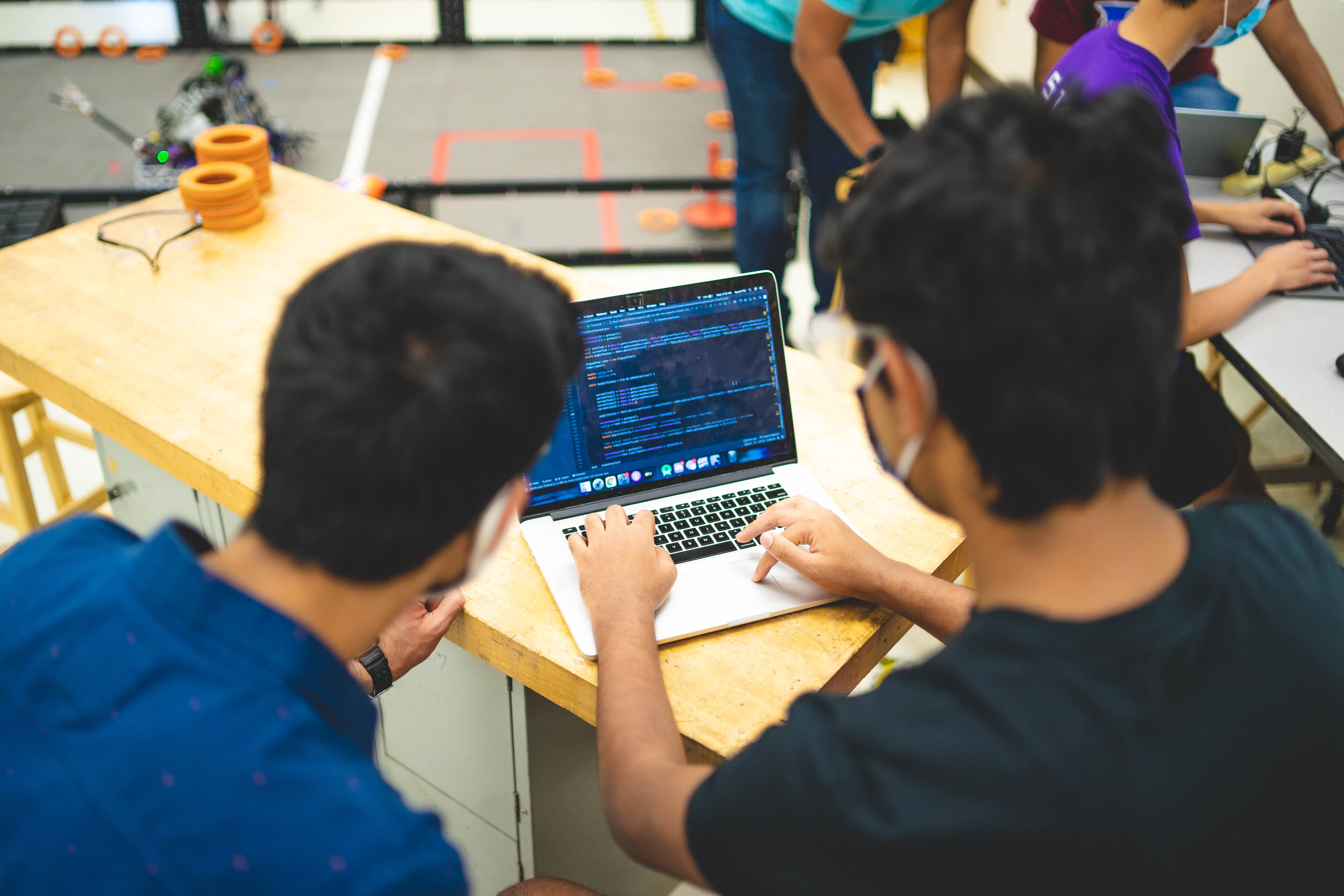
Two PHUHS Robotics programmers writing an autonomous algorithm in preparation for the FTC State Championship.

The International Baccalaureate program has graduated thousands of students, many who have gone on to prestigious universities. The program gives students an advanced course load with a schedule similar to that of a 4-year university. Students take Advanced Placement classes their junior year instead of senior year to allow time to prepare for exams for the IB diploma.

The Career Academy of Business Administration and Management (or C.A.B.A.M.) is a career/college preparatory program which provides students with the opportunity to learn practical business skills and earn industry certifications. The program offers a sequence of courses that provides rigorous content aligned with challenging academic standards and relevant technical knowledge and skills needed to prepare for further education and careers Business. The program provides technical skill proficiency, and includes competency-based applied learning that contributes to the academic knowledge, higher-order reasoning and problem-solving skills, work attitudes, general employment skills, technical skills, occupation-specific skills, and knowledge of all aspects of the Business, Management, and Administration career cluster. In Short: CABAM will give you a head start on college & careers in high skill, high wage, and high demand areas.

PHUHS has six robotics teams which compete in the FIRST Tech Challenge, all but one of whom have earned several awards since their respective establishments in 2008, 2009, 2019, and 2023, including the title of "Winning Alliance Captain" at the 2019 Houston World Championship. PHUHS Robotics has consistently had one or more teams qualify for the FTC Florida State Championship and the Houston World Championship for the past 5 years. For the past 15 years, the club has taught the students the basics of engineering, Java programming, and Computer Aided Design (CAD).

The school's Mathematics Honor Society, Mu Alpha Theta, focuses on developing interest in mathematics and encourages students to pursue paths in engineering, computer science, math education, and other mathematical careers. The club attracted more than 200 members each year. Bolstered by Palm Harbor's math International Baccalaureate Program, Mu Alpha Theta members compete both at the national and state level in divisions ranging from Geometry to Calculus, and winning many awards and recognition throughout. One of the school's many clubs is H.O.S.A. (Health Occupation Students of America).

PHUHS has a very active chapter of FBLA and has had dozens of students place in district and state competitions, and routinely sends students to the FBLA National Convention.

Mu Alpha Theta Logo

Palm Harbor University High School's yearbook is the Aftermath, earning awards from the National Scholastic Press Association, the Columbia Scholastic Press Association, and the Florida Scholastic Press Association.

Palm Harbor's newspaper, The EYE, has received the Florida Scholastic Press Association's All-American Award, and the National Scholastic Press Association's Gold Medal, placing the publication in the top 10% of all high school newspapers in the country.

Other activities include a debate team, started in the 2007-2008 school year and a chapter of the Science National Honor Society, founded in 2012. Also National Technical Honor Society (2018) and Girls Who Code (2020)
