= Tarpon Springs High School =

Coordinates: 28°08′39″N 82°46′43″W

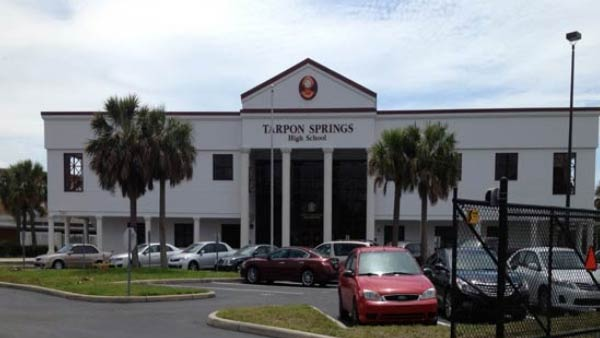
- Administration building

Location
- 1411 Gulf Road; Tarpon Springs, Florida; United States

Information
- Type: Public
- Motto: Be Respectful, Be Responsible, Be Resilient
- Established: 1905
- School district: Pinellas County Schools
- Superintendent: Kevin K. Hendrick
- Principal: Leza Fatolitis
- Teaching staff: 51.00 (FTE)
- Grades: 9-12
- Gender: Coeducational
- Student to teacher ratio: 21.29
- Color
- Mascot: Rey the Sponge Diver
- Nickname: TSHS
- Rival: East Lake High School Palm Harbor University High School
- Website: Tarpon Springs High School

Tarpon Springs High School is a public high school in Tarpon Springs, Florida. The school graduated its first class of seniors in the year 1906. The school is known for its football team, Band, Leadership Conservatory, Culinary department, and Veterinary Science Academy. Its mascot is a sponge diver, reflecting the town's history of sponge diving. The student body was composed of 89% white, 4% African-American, 3% Hispanic, 2% Asian, 2% Mixed-Race, and 0% American Indian.

== Programs ==
- Veterinary Science Academy
- Leadership Conservatory of the Arts
- Culinary
- Cambridge (AICE)
- Early Childhood

=== Clubs ===
The school in 2023 had more than 30 clubs, including:

- Academic Team
- Art Club
- Bowling Club
- Color Guard National Honor Society
- Cambridge Camaraderie Club
- Debate Club
- Drama Club
- Environment Club
- Fellowship of Christian Athletes
- Future Business Leaders of America (FBLA)
- Future Farmers of America
- Gay Straight Alliance (GSA)
- Greek National Honor Society
- Girl Friends of Pinellas
- Interact
- Key Club
- Maroon Mob
- Multi-cultural Committee
- Mu Alpha Theta (math honor society)
- National Honor Society
- National Art Honor Society
- PMAC
- Rotary Club
- Spanish Club
- Student Council
- SAVE Club
- Tri-M Music Honor Society
- Tarpon Springs Young Democrats
- Veterinary Science Club
- Yearbook

== Notable alumni ==
- Gus Bilirakis, politician
- Becky Burleigh, University of Florida Women’s Soccer Coach
- Mike Gruttadauria, former NFL player
- Bertie Higgins, singer-songwriter
- Scottie James (born 1996), basketball player for Hapoel Haifa in the Israeli Basketball Premier League
- Traci Koster, politician and attorney
- Nikitas Loulias, Archbishop of Thyateira and Great Britain (2019-)
- Don Smith, former NFL player for the Denver Broncos
- Kipp Vickers, former NFL player
- Ted Watts, former NFL player
- Mitchell Wilcox, NFL player (New England Patriots)
