= Michael Whiting =

American football player (born 1960)

No. 27
- Position: Fullback

Personal information
- Born: January 11, 1960 (age 66); Clearwater, Florida, U.S.
- Listed height: 6 ft 1 in (1.85 m)
- Listed weight: 210 lb (95 kg)

Career information
- High school: Largo (FL)
- College: Florida State
- NFL draft: 1982: 11th round, 304th overall pick

Career history
- Dallas Cowboys (1982)*; St. Louis Cardinals (1982)*; Tampa Bay Bandits (1983)*; Jacksonville Bulls (1984–1985)
- * Offseason or practice squad member only

Awards and highlights
- Second-team All-South Independents (1981)

Michael L. Whiting (born January 11, 1960) is an American former football fullback in the United States Football League (USFL) for the Jacksonville Bulls. He played college football at Florida State University.

== Early life ==
Whiting attended Largo High School, where he was an all-around fullback. He accepted a football scholarship from Florida State University.

He was a two-year starter at fullback. As a junior, he posted 133 carries for 500 yards, 6 rushing touchdowns and 25 receptions for 203 yards.

As a senior, he registered 111 carries for 461 yards, 4 rushing touchdowns, 29 receptions for 211 yards and 2 receiving touchdowns. In the school's first game against the University of Notre Dame, he had 115 total yards (71 rushing yards) and 2 receiving touchdowns, to help the team win 19-13.

He finished his college career with 355 carries for 1,485 rushing yards (4.2-yard avg.), 12 rushing touchdowns, 74 receptions for 575 yards and 2 receiving touchdowns. He had 2 career 100-rushing games and one 90-yard rushing effort against Ohio State University.

== Professional career ==
=== Dallas Cowboys ===
Whiting was selected by the Dallas Cowboys in the eleventh round (304th overall) of the 1982 NFL draft. He was waived on July 30.

=== St. Louis Cardinals ===
On August 2, 1982, he was claimed off waivers by the St. Louis Cardinals. He was released on August 23.

=== Tampa Bay Bandits (USFL) ===
On September 22, 1982, he was signed as a free agent by the Tampa Bay Bandits of the United States Football League.

=== Jacksonville Bulls (USFL) ===
In 1984, he played with the Jacksonville Bulls of the United States Football League. He played with the team until the league folded.
