= Mavericks High Schools =

Group of charter schools in Florida, United States

Location
- West Palm Beach Greater Miami, Florida; United States

District information
- Type: For-profit charter schools
- Affiliation: Mavericks in Education

Mavericks High Schools are a group of for-profit charter schools in Florida operated by Mavericks in Education, an organization headquartered in West Palm Beach, in Greater Miami, in the United States.

== Overview ==
Mavericks Schools have low graduation rates and use an online curriculum. Francis W. "Frank" Biden, the brother of Joe Biden, President of the United States, markets the chain.

Krista Morton, principal of the Mavericks High of Palm Springs, was arrested for smoking cannabis and being topless with a student in her car in 2017. Morton had been principal at another problem charter school before being hired by Mavericks.

== Schools ==
Mavericks in Education operate the following schools:

In Greater Miami

- Mavericks High of North Miami-Dade County (North Miami Beach)
- Mavericks High of South Miami-Dade County (Homestead)
- Mavericks High of Central Broward County (Fort Lauderdale)
- Mavericks High of North Broward County (Pompano Beach)
- Mavericks High of Palm Beach County (Palm Springs)

In Greater Orlando

- Mavericks High of Osceola County (Kissimmee)

In Pinellas County

- Mavericks High of North Pinellas County (Largo)
- Mavericks High of South Pinellas County (St. Petersburg)
