= Mason Cole =

American football player (born 1996)

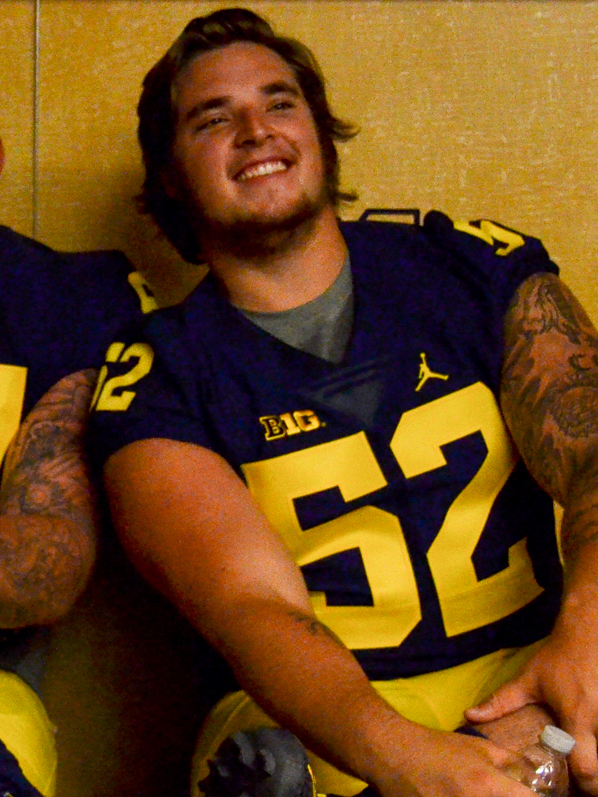
- Cole with the Michigan Wolverines in 2016

Profile
- Position: Center

Personal information
- Born: March 28, 1996 (age 30); Chicago, Illinois, U.S.
- Listed height: 6 ft 5 in (1.96 m)
- Listed weight: 298 lb (135 kg)

Career information
- High school: East Lake (Tarpon Springs, Florida)
- College: Michigan (2014–2017)
- NFL draft: 2018: 3rd round, 97th overall pick

Career history
- Arizona Cardinals (2018–2020); Minnesota Vikings (2021); Pittsburgh Steelers (2022–2023)

Awards and highlights
- 2× Second-team All-Big Ten (2016, 2017)

Career NFL statistics as of 2023
- Games played: 94
- Games started: 73
- Stats at Pro Football Reference

Mason Cole (born March 28, 1996) is an American professional football center. He played college football for the Michigan Wolverines, where he was twice named an All-Big Ten selection. He was selected by the Arizona Cardinals in the third round of the 2018 NFL draft, playing there for three seasons. He has also played for the Minnesota Vikings and Pittsburgh Steelers.

== Early life ==
Cole grew up in Tarpon Springs, Florida, and attended East Lake High School. He was a four-year starter for the East Lake football team and was a participant in the 2014 U.S. Army All-American Bowl. He was also a first-team all-state player in Florida during the 2013 season. Cole's high school coach, Bob Hudson, said of him: "He's that guy, as a coach, that you want a whole team of. He does what he's supposed to do. He stays out of trouble. He's not late to meetings. He's not lazy. He's always moving. He's coachable. He can take criticism. He doesn't need praise every play. He's what you dream of as a coach."

== College career ==
Cole had scholarship offers from numerous universities, including Alabama, Florida, Florida State and Ohio State. In February 2013, he announced his verbal commitment to the University of Michigan.

Cole enrolled early at Michigan in January 2014 at age 17. He was impressive in spring practice and in fall practice, leading to speculation that he might start as a true freshman. Running back Justice Hayes said: "Mason is a phenomenal player, he is a freshman but he doesn't play like it at all. He plays like he's been there for a couple years."

On August 30, 2014, at age 18, Cole became the first Michigan offensive lineman to start in the season opener of his true freshman season, and the first to start at left tackle as a true freshman. Since true freshmen became eligible in 1972, only five have started any games on Michigan's offensive line: Bubba Paris (one game in 1978), Tom Dixon (one game in 1980), Dean Dingman (three games in 1987), Justin Boren (one game in 2006) and Kyle Bosch (three games in 2013). In the 2014 season opener, Michigan backs set a Michigan single-game record with 9.7 yards per carry (350 yards on 36 carries), and the offensive line was credited with the outburst.

Following the 2016 season, Cole was named to the All-Big Ten offensive second-team, by both the coaches and media. Following the 2017 season, Cole was again named to the All-Big Ten offensive second-team, by both the coaches and media.

== Professional career ==
=== Pre-draft ===
On December 18, 2017, it was announced that Cole accepted his invitation to the Senior Bowl. On January 27, 2018, Cole played in the 2018 Reese's Senior Bowl as part of Denver Broncos' head coach Vance Joseph's North team that lost 45–16 to Houston Texans' head coach Bill O'Brien's South team. Cole attended the NFL Scouting Combine and performed all of the combine drills.

External videos
- Mason Cole's NFL Combine Workout
- Mason Cole's 40-yard dash

On March 23, 2018, Cole participated at Michigan's pro day and performed the vertical jump (27.5"), short shuttle (4.72s), and positional drills. At the conclusion of the pre-draft process, Cole was projected to be a fourth round pick by NFL draft experts and scouts. He was ranked as the fifth best center prospect in the draft by DraftScout.com and Scouts Inc.

Pre-draft measurables
Height	Weight	Arm length	Hand span	40-yard dash	10-yard split	20-yard split	20-yard shuttle	Three-cone drill	Vertical jump	Broad jump	Bench press
6 ft 4 1/8 in (1.93 m)	307 lb (139 kg)	32 1/8 in (0.82 m)	9 5/8 in (0.24 m)	5.23 s	1.75 s	3.00 s	4.72 s	7.77 s	27.5 in (0.70 m)	8 ft 8 in (2.64 m)	23 reps
All values from NFL Combine/Pro Day

=== Arizona Cardinals ===
The Arizona Cardinals selected Cole in the third round (97th overall) of the 2018 NFL draft. Cole was the fourth center drafted in 2018.

External videos
- Cardinals draft Mason Cole 97th overall

On May 31, 2018, the Cardinals signed Cole to a four-year, $3.32 million contract that includes a signing bonus of $761,516. He was named the Cardinals starting center in 2018, and started all 16 games.

Cole entered the 2019 season as a backup interior lineman. He started two games at left guard in place of injury.

=== Minnesota Vikings ===
On March 25, 2021, Cole was traded to Minnesota Vikings in exchange for a sixth-round pick in the 2021 NFL draft. He started at center for four weeks mid-season in place of Garrett Bradbury, who was out due to COVID-19. He then took over the starting right guard spot for three games before suffering an elbow injury in Week 15. He was placed on injured reserve on December 24, 2021.

=== Pittsburgh Steelers ===
Cole signed a three-year contract with the Pittsburgh Steelers on March 17, 2022. He was named the starting center, starting every game in 2022 and 2023. In 2023, he made his only postseason start of his career during the Steelers 31–17 loss to the Buffalo Bills.

Cole was heavily criticized during his time with Pittsburgh. PFF had him ranked at 32 of 35 eligible centers in the league in 2023. He was also ranked the lowest in pass protection of any lineman. That same season, he was credited with giving up a sack that allowed for quarterback Kenny Pickett to suffer an ankle injury, which ended his season.

On February 23, 2024, Cole was released by the Steelers.
