= Largo High School (Florida) =

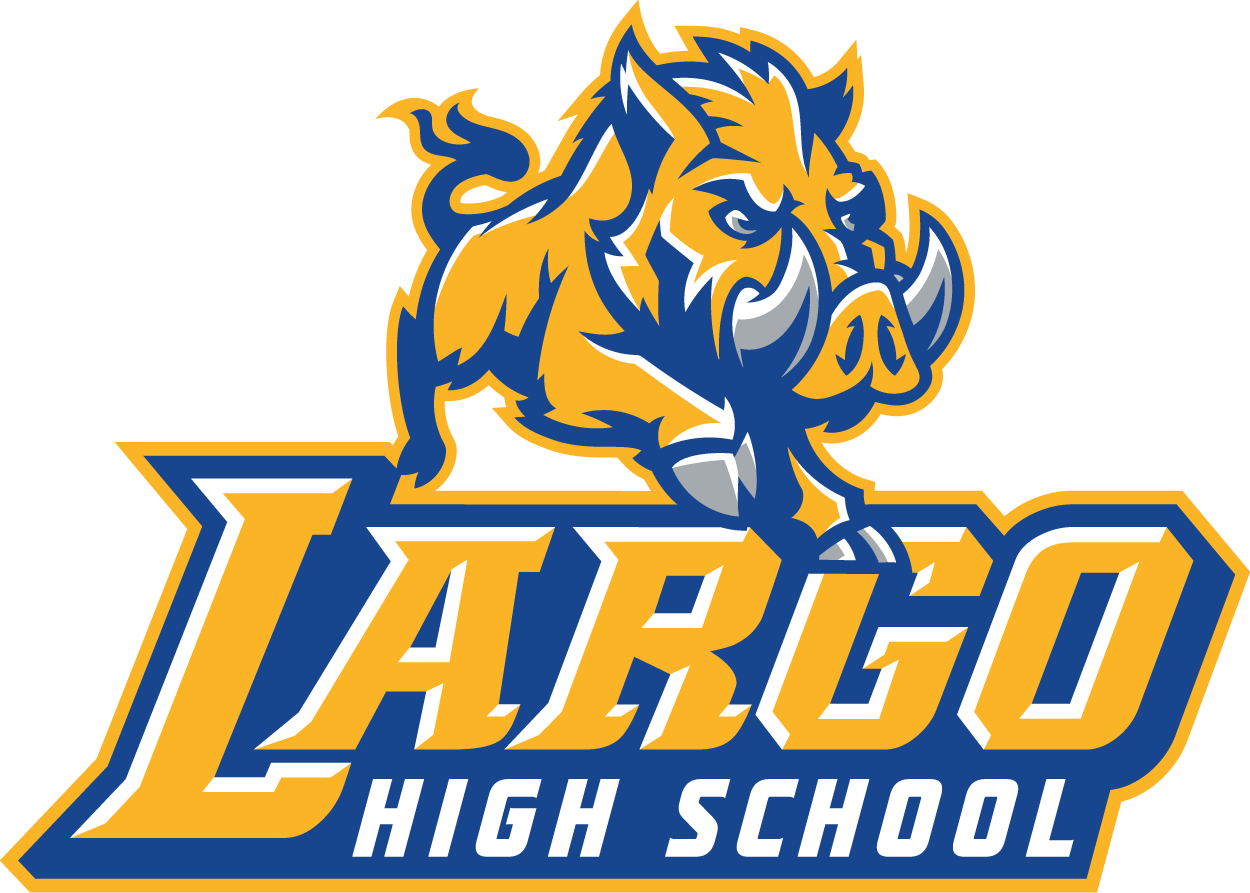

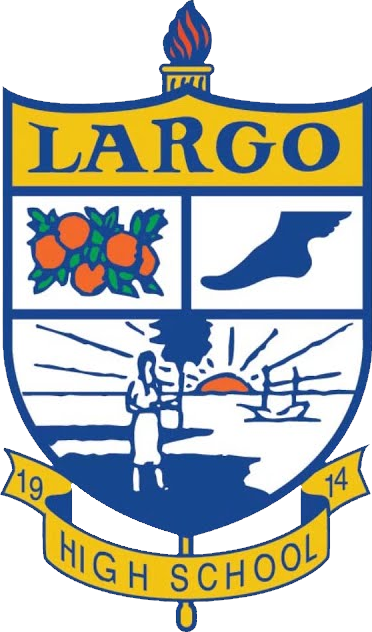

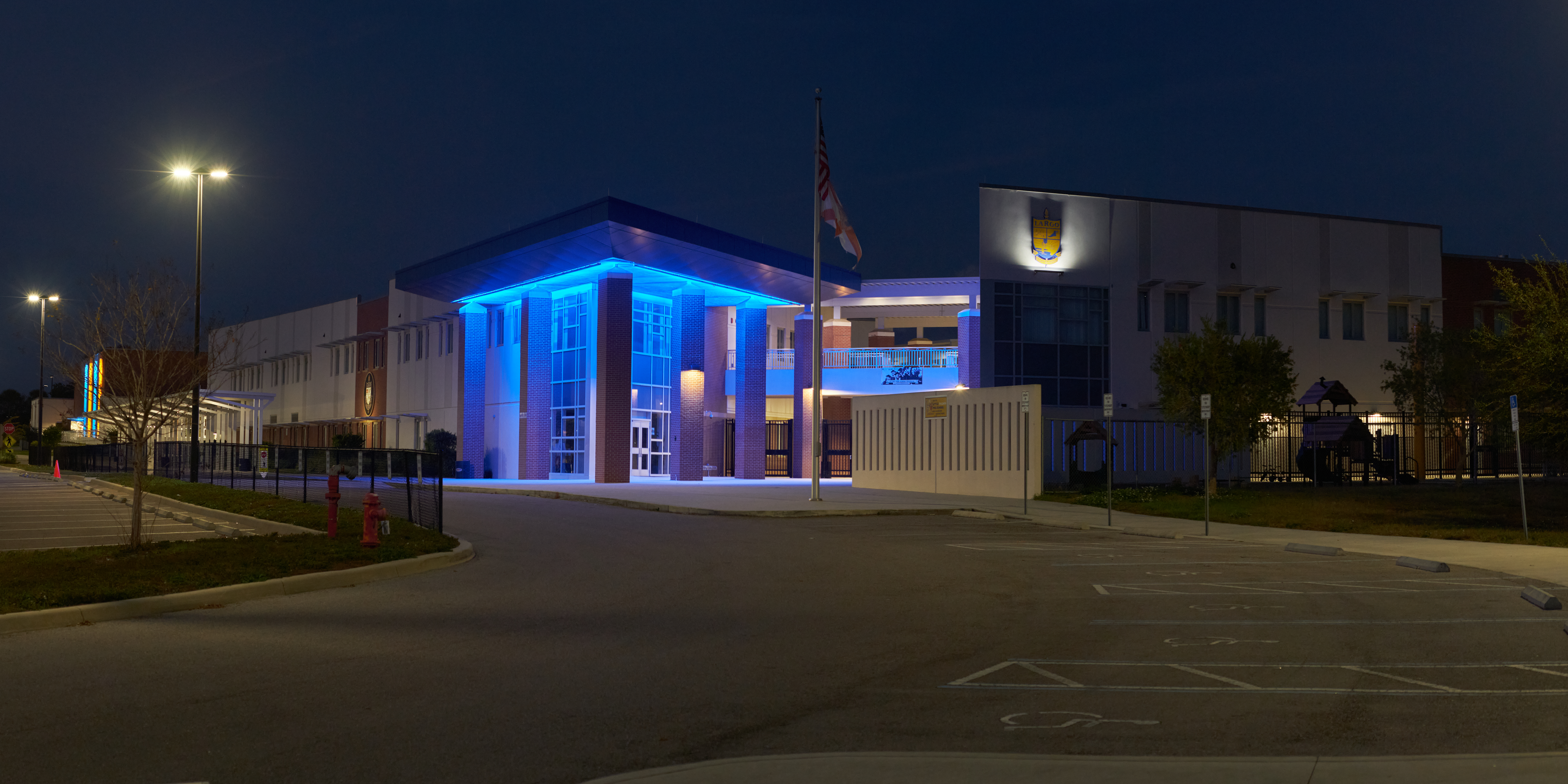

Location
- 410 Missouri Avenue; Largo, Florida 33770; United States
- Coordinates: 27°55′11.25″N 82°47′14.32″W

Information
- Type: Public high school
- Established: 1914
- School district: Pinellas County Schools
- Principal: Jennifer Staten
- Teaching staff: 91.00 FTE (2022–23)
- Grades: 9–12
- Enrollment: 2,055 (2022–23)
- Student to teacher ratio: 22.58 (2022–23)
- Colors: Blue and Gold
- Mascot: Packer/Hog
- Website: pcsb.org/largo-hs

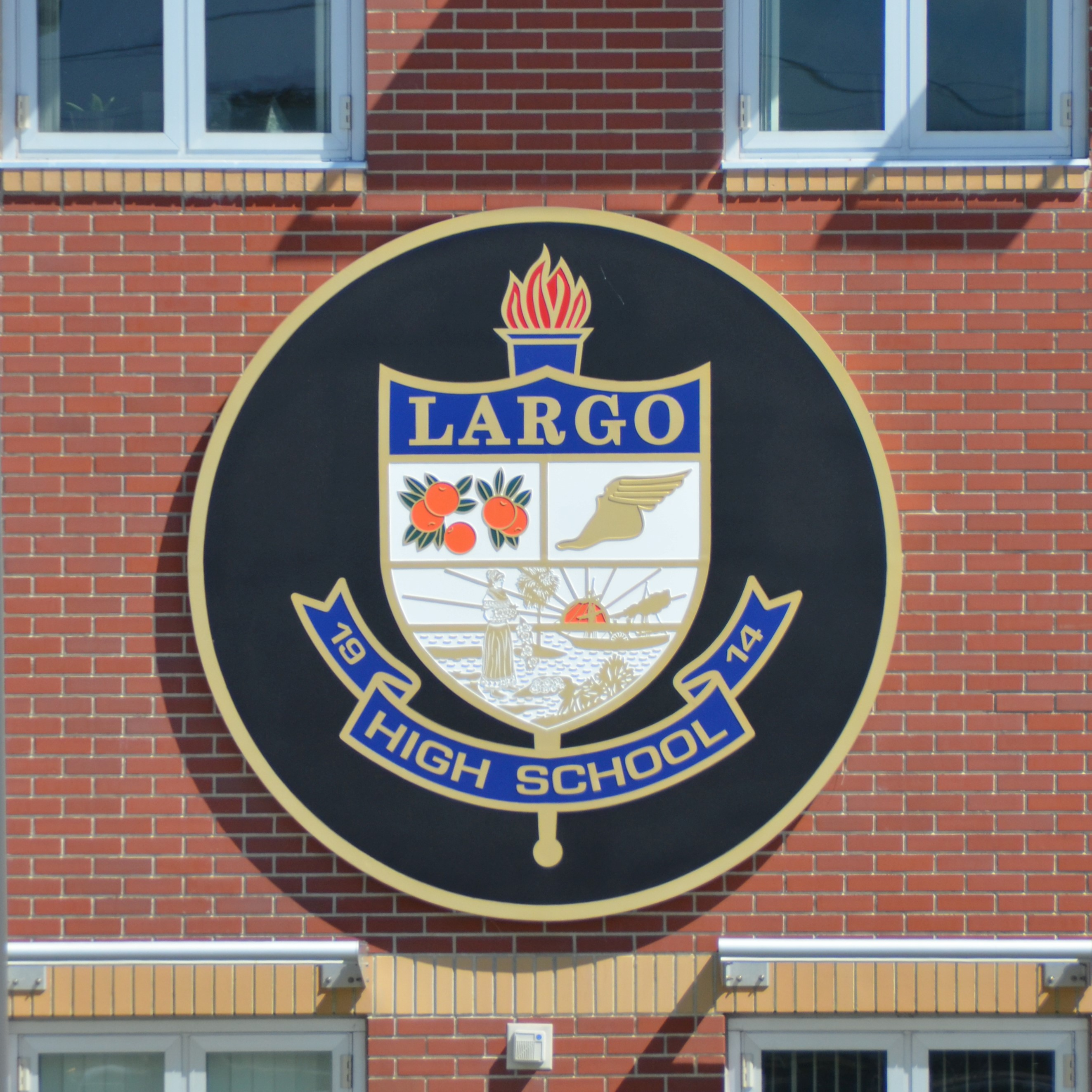
A view of Largo High School's seal from the front of the rebuilt building

Largo High School is a public high school in Largo, Florida, United States. The school's athletic teams are known as the Packers, and the school colors are blue and gold. Its current principal is Jennifer Staten. The school was recently rebuilt and finished reconstruction in 2016. The school has two magnet programs, ExCEL and an IB Diploma Programme.

== Notable alumni ==
- Jay Bocook, composer and arranger; Director of Athletic Bands at Furman University in Greenville, South Carolina
- Al Conover, former football player and coach
- Jack E. Davis, Pulitzer Prize-winning author.
- Leonard Johnson, former NFL cornerback
- Cory Lopez, professional surfer
- Terrence Mann, Broadway actor, original cast of Cats; voice actor
- Dexter McCluster, former NFL running back
- Chester B. McMullen, U.S. representative for Florida's 1st Congressional District (1951-1953)
- Marcus Paschal, former NFL safety
- Karissa and Kristina Shannon, Playboy Playmates; Miss July and Miss August 2009
- Michael Whiting, former USFL fullback
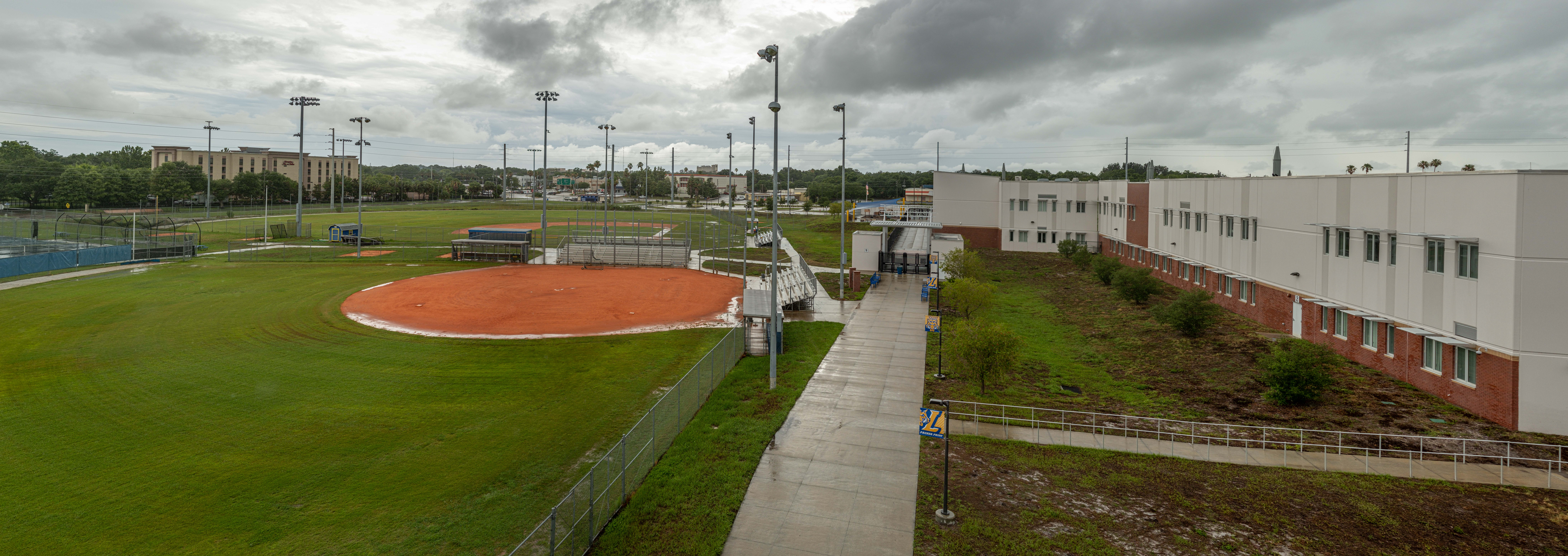

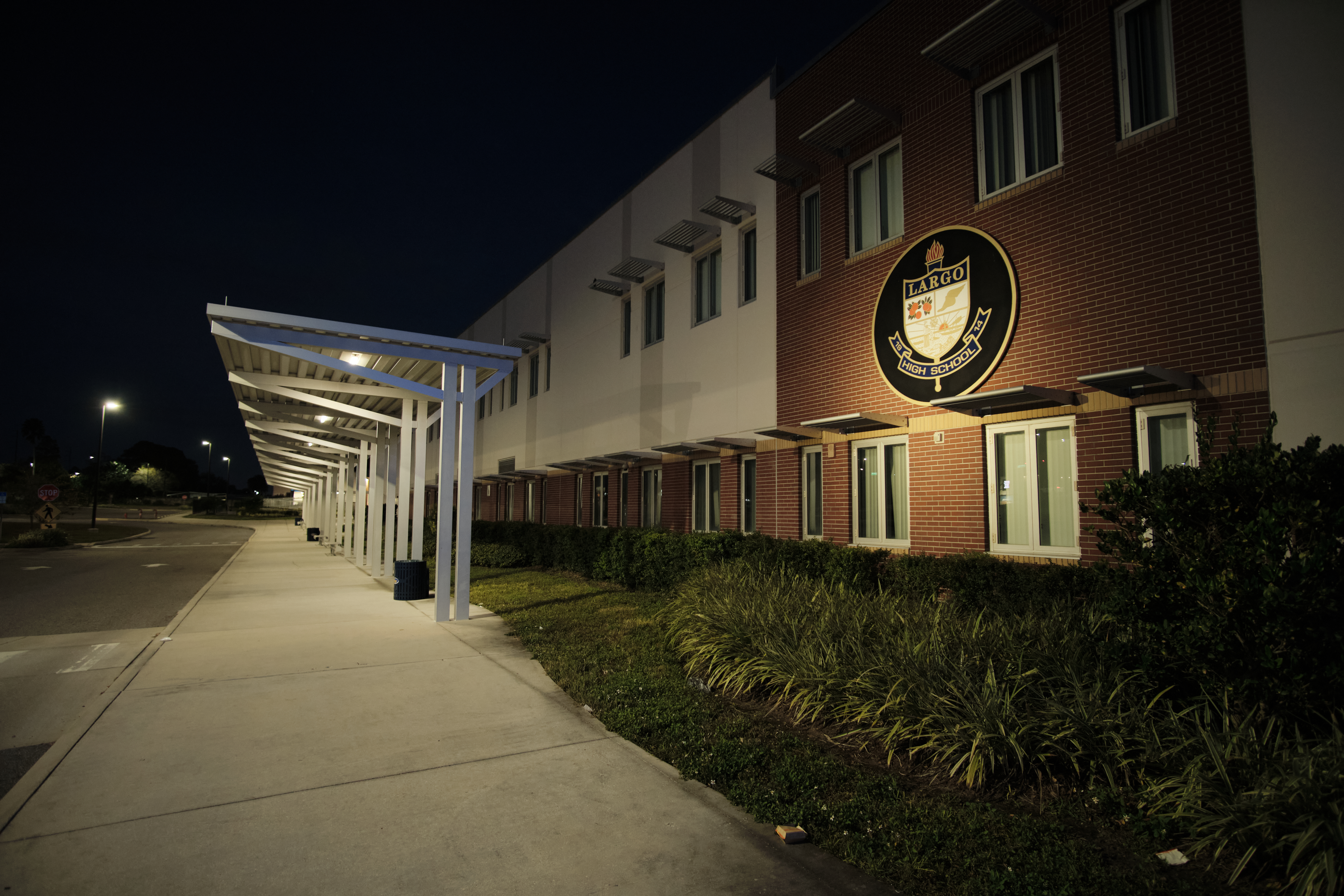
