= Florida Scholastic Press Association =

The Florida Scholastic Press Association (FSPA) is a not-for-profit organization founded in 1946. It is the scholastic press association for the state of Florida. Its members consist of more than 300 student publications (including newspapers and yearbooks), online media teams and broadcast programs from the state. The main mission of the organization is to educate, train and support scholastic journalists and their advisers.

Steven Jay Thor was president of the FSPA in 1990. Joe Henry was president of the FSPA in 2012.
