= Osceola Fundamental High School =

Coordinates: 27.861193°N 82.774534°W

Location
- 9751 98th Street; North Seminole, Florida; United States

Information
- Type: public coeducational secondary school
- Established: 1981
- School district: Pinellas County Schools
- Teaching staff: 76.00 (FTE)
- Grades: 9–12
- Enrollment: 1,715 (2022-2023)
- Student to teacher ratio: 22.57
- Colors: Royal Blue and Orange
- Mascot: Warrior
- Accreditation: Florida State Department of Education
- Publication: The Oracle
- Newspaper: The Warrior Record
- Yearbook: The Everglade
- Website: osceola-hs.pcsb.org

Osceola Fundamental High School is a high school in Seminole, Florida operated by Pinellas County Schools. The school is named after the Seminole war chief, Osceola.

== School mission ==
Osceola Fundamental High School’s mission is "to sustain an environment where staff, students, parents and community work collaboratively to support all students in meeting or exceeding graduation requirements".

== Fundamental status ==
Osceola describes itself as the first "fundamental" high school in Florida, meaning, according to the school website, that it is "like schools used to be". Parents and students must adhere to a set of guidelines for student conduct, homework submission, and parental involvement. Parents are required to attend monthly meetings, and sign all of their children's homework assignments.

Parents and students who do not comply with school policies are first given warnings, and if noncompliance continues, required to meet with the school-based Intervention and Appeal Committee (IAC), which may recommend alternatives and interventions for improvement, probation with stipulations, or removal from the school.Osceola Fundemental has opperated as an “A” school in Pinellas County for the last 15 years (2010/2011-2025/2026).

== Extracurricular activities ==
As of 2023, extracurricular activities offered include student government, Interact Club, National Honor Society, Spanish Club, Oracle literary magazine, Tri-M Music Honor Society, Principal's Multicultural Club, International Thespian Society, Drama Club, Gay Straight Alliance, Key Club, and Academic Team.

== Athletics ==
Athletics include baseball, basketball, cheerleading, cross-country, flag football (girls), football, golf, marching band, soccer, softball, spring football, swimming, tennis, track, volleyball (girls), and wrestling.

== Former principals ==
- Bob Kalach (1981–1983)
- John McLay (1983–1989)
- Richard Misenti (1989–1994)
- Doug Smith (1994–2004)
- Carol Moore (2004–2010)
- Michael Bohnet (2010–2026)
- Brad Bernstein (2026–present)
