= South Florida Bulls football statistical leaders =

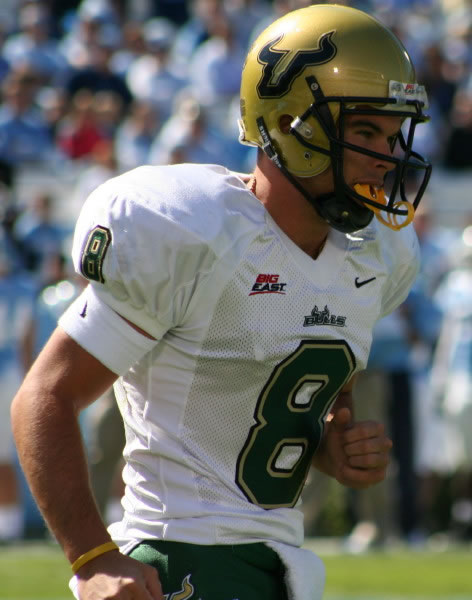
Matt Grothe is second on the program’s career passing yards list.

The South Florida Bulls football statistical leaders are individual statistical leaders of the South Florida Bulls football program in various categories, including passing, rushing, receiving, total offense, all-purpose yardage, defensive stats, and kicking. Within those areas, the lists identify single-game, single-season, and career leaders. The Bulls represent the University of South Florida in the NCAA Division I FBS American Conference.

South Florida began competing in intercollegiate football in 1997, so the typical issues with school records do not exist. There is no period of the late 19th and early 20th century with spotty, incomplete records. Also, the Bulls' records are also not affected by the 1972 NCAA decision to allow freshmen to play varsity football or the 2002 NCAA decision to count bowl games in players' official statistics. One minor issue is that the Bulls played their first four seasons in Division I-AA, now known as Division I FCS, which before the 2026 season limited teams to 11 regular-season games (in most years) instead of the 12 that have been allowed in Division I FBS throughout USF's football history.

Other issues that have given more recent players additional games are:

- Due to COVID-19 issues, the NCAA ruled that the 2020 season would not count against the athletic eligibility of any football player, giving everyone who played in that season the opportunity for five years of eligibility instead of the normal four.
- Since 2018, players have been allowed to participate in as many as four games in a redshirt season; previously, playing in even one game "burned" the redshirt. Since 2024, postseason games have not counted against the four-game limit.

The lists below are updated through Week 11 of the 2026 season.

== Passing ==
=== Passing yards ===
Career
Rank	Player	Yards	Years
1	Marquel Blackwell	9,108	1999 2000 2001 2002
2	Matt Grothe	8,669	2006 2007 2008 2009
3	B.J. Daniels	8,433	2008 2009 2010 2011 2012
4	Quinton Flowers	8,130	2014 2015 2016 2017
5	Byrum Brown	7,690	2022 2023 2024 2025
6	Chad Barnhardt	4,138	1997 1998
7	Pat Julmiste	3,461	2003 2004 2005 2006
8	Blake Barnett	3,139	2018 2019
9	Jordan McCloud	2,770	2019 2020
10	Mike White	2,722	2013 2014

Single season
Rank	Player	Yards	Year
1	Byrum Brown	3,292	2023
2	Byrum Brown	3,158	2025
3	Matt Grothe	2,911	2008
	Quinton Flowers	2,911	2017
5	Marquel Blackwell	2,882	2001
6	Quinton Flowers	2,812	2016
7	Blake Barnett	2,705	2018
8	Matt Grothe	2,670	2007
9	Marquel Blackwell	2,590	2002
10	B.J. Daniels	2,585	2011

Single game
Rank	Player	Yards	Year	Opponent
1	Quinton Flowers	503	2017	UCF
2	Byrum Brown	435	2023	Rice
3	Blake Barnett	411	2018	Illinois
4	B.J. Daniels	409	2011	Cincinnati
5	Jordan McCloud	404	2020	UCF
6	Quinton Flowers	385	2017	Connecticut
7	Matt Grothe	382	2007	Cincinnati
	B.J. Daniels	382	2011	Florida A&M
9	Matt Grothe	364	2006	Syracuse
10	B.J. Daniels	363	2012	Nevada

=== Passing touchdowns ===
Career
Rank	Player	TDs	Years
1	Quinton Flowers	71	2014 2015 2016 2017
2	Marquel Blackwell	67	1999 2000 2001 2002
3	Byrum Brown	61	2022 2023 2024 2025
4	B.J. Daniels	52	2008 2009 2010 2011 2012
	Matt Grothe	52	2006 2007 2008 2009
6	Chad Barnhardt	27	1997 1998
7	Jordan McCloud	21	2019 2020
8	Pat Julmiste	17	2003 2004 2005 2006
9	Blake Barnett	16	2018 2019
10	Ronnie Banks	11	2001 2002 2003 2004

Single season
Rank	Player	TDs	Year
1	Byrum Brown	28	2025
2	Byrum Brown	26	2023
3	Quinton Flowers	25	2017
4	Quinton Flowers	24	2016
5	Quinton Flowers	22	2015
6	Marquel Blackwell	20	2001
7	Marquel Blackwell	18	2002
	Matt Grothe	18	2008
9	Chad Barnhardt	17	1998
10	Marquel Blackwell	16	1999

Single game
Rank	Player	TDs	Year	Opponent
1	Marquel Blackwell	5	2002	East Carolina
	Byrum Brown	5	2023	Memphis
3	Chad Barnhardt	4	1998	Hofstra
	Marquel Blackwell	4	2000	Liberty
	Marquel Blackwell	4	2001	Pittsburgh
	Marquel Blackwell	4	2001	Liberty
	Ronnie Banks	4	2003	Nicholls State
	B.J. Daniels	4	2011	Florida A&M
	Quinton Flowers	4	2015	Cincinnati
	Quinton Flowers	4	2016	Northern Illinois
	Quinton Flowers	4	2017	Illinois
	Quinton Flowers	4	2017	UCF
	Quinton Flowers	4	2017	Texas Tech (Birmingham Bowl)
	Jordan McCloud	4	2020	UCF
	Byrum Brown	4	2023	Charlotte
	Byrum Brown	4	2025	South Carolina State
	Byrum Brown	4	2025	Charlotte
	Byrum Brown	4	2025	Rice

== Rushing ==
=== Rushing yards ===
Career
Rank	Player	Yards	Years
1	Quinton Flowers	3,672	2014 2015 2016 2017
2	Marlon Mack	3,609	2014 2015 2016
3	Andre Hall	2,731	2004 2005
4	Byrum Brown	2,265	2022 2023 2024 2025
5	Rafael Williams	2,253	1997 1998 1999 2000
6	Kelley Joiner	2,211	2019 2020 2021 2022 2023 2024
7	Matt Grothe	2,206	2006 2007 2008 2009
8	B.J. Daniels	2,068	2008 2009 2010 2011 2012
9	Brian Battie	1,842	2020 2021 2022
10	Darius Tice	1,817	2013 2014 2015 2016 2017

Single season
Rank	Player	Yards	Year
1	Quinton Flowers	1,530	2016
2	Marlon Mack	1,381	2015
3	Andre Hall	1,374	2005
4	Andre Hall	1,357	2004
5	Marlon Mack	1,187	2016
6	Brian Battie	1,186	2022
7	Jordan Cronkrite	1,121	2018
8	Quinton Flowers	1,078	2017
9	Marlon Mack	1,041	2014
10	Dyral McMillan	1,017	1999

Single game
Rank	Player	Yards	Year	Opponent
1	Jordan Cronkrite	302	2018	UMass
2	Andre Hall	275	2004	UAB
	Marlon Mack	275	2014	Western Carolina
4	Dyral McMillan	258	1999	New Haven
5	Marlon Mack	230	2015	Temple
6	Andre Hall	222	2005	Syracuse
7	Dyral McMillan	221	1999	Hofstra
8	Quinton Flowers	210	2016	Memphis
9	Mike Ford	207	2010	Northern Illinois
10	Quinton Flowers	201	2015	SMU

=== Rushing touchdowns ===
Career
Rank	Player	TDs	Years
1	Quinton Flowers	41	2015 2016 2017
2	Marlon Mack	32	2014 2015 2016
3	Byrum Brown	31	2022 2023 2024 2025
4	B.J. Daniels	25	2008 2009 2010 2011 2012
5	Andre Hall	24	2004 2005
6	Matt Grothe	23	2006 2007 2008 2009
	Mike Ford	23	2007 2008 2009
8	Marquel Blackwell	20	1999 2000 2001 2002
9	Jaren Mangham	18	2021 2022
	Demetris Murray	18	2009 2010 2011 2012
	Rafael Williams	18	1997 1998 1999 2000

Single season
Rank	Player	TDs	Year
1	Quinton Flowers	18	2016
	Marlon Mack	15	2016
	Jaren Mangham	15	2021
4	Byrum Brown	14	2025
5	Andre Hall	13	2005
6	Mike Ford	12	2007
	Quinton Flowers	12	2015
	Kelley Joiner	12	2024
9	Andre Hall	11	2004
	Darius Tice	11	2017
	Quinton Flowers	11	2017
	Byrum Brown	11	2023

Single game
Rank	Player	TDs	Year	Opponent
1	Ben Williams	4	2007	Florida Atlantic
	Marlon Mack	4	2014	Western Carolina

== Receiving ==
=== Receptions ===
Career
Rank	Player	Rec	Years
1	Sean Atkins	200	2019 2020 2021 2022 2023 2024
2	Andre Davis	153	2011 2012 2013 2014
3	Rodney Adams	135	2014 2015 2016
4	Hugh Smith	131	1999 2000 2001 2002
5	Tyre McCants	127	2015 2016 2017 2018
6	Huey Whittaker	117	2001 2002 2003
7	Xavier Weaver	116	2019 2020 2021 2022
8	Taurus Johnson	112	2005 2006 2007 2008
9	Jessie Hester	107	2005 2007 2008 2009
	Dontavia Bogan	107	2007 2008 2009 2010

Single season
Rank	Player	Rec	Year
1	Sean Atkins	92	2023
2	Sean Atkins	79	2024
3	Rodney Adams	67	2016
4	Hugh Smith	62	2002
5	Tyre McCants	59	2018
6	Jessie Hester	54	2008
7	Marquez Valdes-Scantling	53	2017
	Xavier Weaver	53	2022
9	Huey Whittaker	52	2001
10	Keshaun Singleton	50	2025

Single game
Rank	Player	Rec	Year	Opponent
1	Andre Davis	12	2012	Nevada
2	DeAndrew Rubin	11	2001	Pittsburgh
	Dontavia Bogan	11	2010	Cincinnati
	Bryce Miller	11	2020	UCF
	Sean Atkins	11	2024	Miami (FL)
	Sean Atkins	11	2024	San Jose State
7	Hugh Smith	10	2002	Northern Illinois
	Jessie Hester	10	2008	Rutgers
	Marquez Valdes-Scantling	10	2017	Houston
	Tyre McCants	10	2018	Georgia Tech
	Sean Atkins	10	2023	UTSA
	Christian Neptune	10	2025	Old Dominion

=== Receiving yards ===
Career
Rank	Player	Yards	Years
1	Sean Atkins	2,167	2019 2020 2021 2022 2023 2024
2	Andre Davis	2,136	2011 2012 2013 2014
3	Rodney Adams	1,967	2014 2015 2016
4	Tyre McCants	1,856	2015 2016 2017 2018
5	Xavier Weaver	1,735	2019 2020 2021 2022
6	Carlton Mitchell	1,648	2007 2008 2009
7	Dontavia Bogan	1,534	2007 2008 2009 2010
8	Hugh Smith	1,523	1999 2000 2001 2002
9	Huey Whittaker	1,447	2001 2002 2003
10	Taurus Johnson	1,434	2005 2006 2007 2008

Single season
Rank	Player	Yards	Year
1	Sean Atkins	1,054	2023
2	Marquez Valdes-Scantling	879	2017
3	Keshaun Singleton	877	2025
4	Rodney Adams	822	2015
	Rodney Adams	822	2016
6	Sean Atkins	781	2024
7	Andre Davis	735	2013
8	Xavier Weaver	718	2022
9	Xavier Weaver	715	2021
10	Carlton Mitchell	706	2009

Single game
Rank	Player	Yards	Year	Opponent
1	Naiem Simmons	272	2023	Rice
2	Tyre McCants	227	2017	UCF
3	Andre Davis	191	2012	Nevada
4	Marquez Valdes-Scantling	186	2017	Houston
5	Jimmy Horn Jr.	180	2018	East Carolina
6	Mudia Reuben	174	2025	UAB
7	Sean Atkins	169	2023	Temple
8	Randall St. Felix	165	2018	Marshall
9	Andre Davis	154	2014	Tulsa
10	Marquez Valdes-Scantling	152	2017	Connecticut

=== Receiving touchdowns ===
Career
Rank	Player	TDs	Years
1	Andre Davis	17	2011 2012 2013 2014
2	Rodney Adams	16	2014 2015 2016
	Tyre McCants	16	2015 2016 2017 2018
4	DeAndrew Rubin	14	1999 2000 2001 2002
5	Taurus Johnson	12	2005 2006 2007 2008
	Dontavia Bogan	12	2007 2008 2009 2010
	D'Ernest Johnson	12	2014 2015 2016 2017
	Sean Atkins	12	2019 2020 2021 2022 2023 2024
9	Marquez Valdes-Scantling	11	2016 2017
	Mitchell Wilcox	11	2016 2017 2018 2019
	Keshaun Singleton	11	2024 2025

Single season
Rank	Player	TDs	Year
1	Rodney Adams	9	2015
2	Keshaun Singleton	8	2025
	Jeremiah Koger	8	2025
4	Elgin Hicks	7	2003
	Andre Davis	7	2014
	Tyre McCants	7	2017
	Sean Atkins	7	2023
8	R.J. Anderson	6	1998
	Scott McCready	6	2000
	Taurus Johnson	6	2008
	Dontavia Bogan	6	2010
	Andre Davis	6	2012
	Marquez Valdes-Scantling	6	2017
	Xavier Weaver	6	2022

Single game
Rank	Player	TDs	Year	Opponent
1	Elgin Hicks	3	2003	East Carolina
	Andre Davis	3	2014	Tulsa
	Rodney Adams	3	2015	Connecticut

== Total offense ==
Total offense is the sum of passing and rushing statistics.

=== Total offense yards ===
Career
Rank	Player	Yards	Years
1	Quinton Flowers	11,802	2014 2015 2016 2017
2	Matt Grothe	10,875	2006 2007 2008 2009
3	B.J. Daniels	10,501	2008 2009 2010 2011 2012
4	Marquel Blackwell	10,343	1999 2000 2001 2002
5	Byrum Brown	9,955	2022 2023 2024 2025
6	Pat Julmiste	4,456	2003 2004 2005 2006
7	Chad Barnhardt	3,996	1997 1998
8	Marlon Mack	3,609	2014 2015 2016
9	Blake Barnett	3,508	2018 2019
10	Jordan McCloud	3,127	2019 2020

Single season
Rank	Player	Yards	Year
1	Quinton Flowers	4,342	2016
2	Byrum Brown	4,166	2025
3	Byrum Brown	4,101	2023
4	Quinton Flowers	3,989	2017
5	Matt Grothe	3,542	2007
6	Matt Grothe	3,502	2008
7	Quinton Flowers	3,287	2015
8	Matt Grothe	3,198	2006
9	B.J. Daniels	3,186	2011
10	Marquel Blackwell	3,123	2001

Single game
Rank	Player	Yards	Year	Opponent
1	Quinton Flowers	605	2017	UCF
2	Byrum Brown	517	2023	Rice
3	Quinton Flowers	516	2017	Connecticut
4	Quinton Flowers	473	2016	Memphis
5	B.J. Daniels	463	2011	Cincinnati
	Byrum Brown	463	2025	Navy
7	Matt Grothe	457	2007	Cincinnati
	Byrum Brown	457	2023	Memphis
9	B.J. Daniels	445	2009	Louisville
10	Marquel Blackwell	420	2000	Western Kentucky

=== Total touchdowns ===
Career
Rank	Player	TDs	Years
1	Quinton Flowers	112	2014 2015 2016 2017
2	Byrum Brown	92	2022 2023 2024 2025
3	Marquel Blackwell	87	1999 2000 2001 2002
4	B.J. Daniels	77	2008 2009 2010 2011 2012
5	Matt Grothe	75	2006 2007 2008 2009
6	Marlon Mack	32	2014 2015 2016
7	Pat Julmiste	31	2003 2004 2005 2006
8	Chad Barnhardt	28	1997 1998
9	Jordan McCloud	26	2019 2020
10	Andre Hall	25	2004 2005

Single season
Rank	Player	TDs	Year
1	Quinton Flowers	42	2016
	Byrum Brown	42	2025
3	Byrum Brown	37	2023
4	Quinton Flowers	36	2017
5	Quinton Flowers	34	2015
6	Marquel Blackwell	29	2001
7	Matt Grothe	24	2006
	Matt Grothe	24	2007
9	Marquel Blackwell	23	2002
	B.J. Daniels	23	2009

Single game
Rank	Player	TDs	Year	Opponent
1	Marquel Blackwell	5	2001	Pittsburgh
	Marquel Blackwell	5	2002	East Carolina
	B.J. Daniels	5	2012	Florida A&M
	Quinton Flowers	5	2015	UCF
	Quinton Flowers	5	2016	Connecticut
	Quinton Flowers	5	2016	Memphis
	Quinton Flowers	5	2016	South Carolina
	Quinton Flowers	5	2017	Illinois
	Quinton Flowers	5	2017	UCF
	Quinton Flowers	5	2017	Texas Tech (Birmingham Bowl)
	Jordan McCloud	5	2019	South Carolina State
	Jordan McCloud	5	2020	UCF
	Byrum Brown	5	2023	Florida A&M
	Byrum Brown	5	2023	Memphis
	Byrum Brown	5	2023	Charlotte
	Byrum Brown	5	2025	Charlotte
	Byrum Brown	5	2025	North Texas
	Byrum Brown	5	2025	UAB
	Byrum Brown	5	2025	Rice

== All-purpose ==
All-purpose yardage is the sum of receiving, rushing, and return statistics.

=== Total all-purpose yards ===
Career
Rank	Player	Yards	Years
1	D'Ernest Johnson	4,166	2014 2015 2016 2017
2	Marlon Mack	4,107	2014 2015 2016
3	DeAndrew Rubin	3,898	1999 2000 2001 2002
4	Quinton Flowers	3,669	2014 2015 2016 2017
5	Andre Hall	3,533	2004 2005
6	Brian Battie	3,462	2020 2021 2022
7	Rodney Adams	3,452	2014 2015 2016
8	Charlie Jackson	3,289	1997 1998 1999 2000
9	Dontavia Bogan	3,179	2007 2008 2009 2010
10	Lindsey Lamar	3,162	2009 2010 2011 2012

Single season
Rank	Player	Yards	Year
1	Brian Battie	1,936	2022
2	Andre Hall	1,838	2004
3	Andre Hall	1,695	2005
4	Rodney Adams	1,587	2016
5	Quinton Flowers	1,527	2016
6	Marlon Mack	1,492	2015
7	Marlon Mack	1,414	2016
8	Rodney Adams	1,369	2015
9	Jermaine Clemons	1,319	1997
10	D'Ernest Johnson	1,280	2016

Single game
Rank	Player	Yards	Year	Opponent
1	Jordan Cronkrite	302	2018	UMass
2	Brian Battie	293	2022	Temple
3	Terrence Horne	283	2018	Georgia Tech
4	D'Ernest Johnson	281	2015	Cincinnati
5	Marlon Mack	280	2014	Western Carolina
6	Andre Hall	274	2004	UAB
7	Marlon Mack	272	2015	Temple
	Naiem Simmons	272	2023	Rice
9	DeAndrew Rubin	271	2001	Pittsburgh
10	Rodney Adams	270	2016	Memphis

=== Total touchdowns ===
Career
Rank	Player	TDs	Years
1	Quinton Flowers	41	2015 2016 2017
2	Marlon Mack	33	2014 2015 2016
3	Byrum Brown	32	2022 2023 2024 2025
4	D'Ernest Johnson	29	2014 2015 2016 2017
5	Andre Hall	27	2004 2005
6	B.J. Daniels	25	2008 2009 2010 2011 2012
7	Rodney Adams	24	2014 2015 2016
	Mike Ford	24	2007 2008 2009
9	Matt Grothe	23	2006 2007 2008 2009
10	Kelley Joiner	21	2019 2020 2021 2022 2023 2024

Single season
Rank	Player	TDs	Year
1	Quinton Flowers	18	2016
2	Andre Hall	15	2005
	Marlon Mack	15	2016
	Jaren Mangham	15	2021
5	D'Ernest Johnson	14	2016
	Kelley Joiner	14	2024
	Byrum Brown	14	2025
8	Mike Ford	13	2007
9	Otis Dixon	12	1998
	Andre Hall	12	2004
	Quinton Flowers	12	2015

Single game
Rank	Player	TDs	Year	Opponent
1	Jermaine Clemons	4	1997	Kentucky Wesleyan
	Dyral McMillan	4	1999	New Hampshire
	Andre Hall	4	2004	TCU
	Ben Williams	4	2007	Florida Atlantic
	Darrell Scott	4	2011	Florida A&M
	Marlon Mack	4	2014	Western Carolina

== Defense ==
=== Interceptions ===
Career
Rank	Player	Ints	Years
1	J.R. Reed	18	2000 2001 2002 2003
2	Trae Williams	16	2004 2005 2006 2007
3	Deatrick Nichols	11	2014 2015 2016 2017
4	Anthony Henry	10	1997 1998 1999 2000
5	Nate Allen	9	2006 2007 2008 2009
	Devin Abraham	9	2014 2015 2016 2017
7	Roy Manns	8	1997 1998 1999 2000
	Ron Hemingway	8	2000 2001 2002 2003
	Jerome Murphy	8	2006 2007 2008 2009
	Ronnie Hoggins	8	2015 2016 2017 2018

Single season
Rank	Player	Ints	Year
1	J.R. Reed	7	2003
	Trae Williams	7	2006
3	J.R. Reed	6	2002
	Trae Williams	6	2007
5	Roy Manns	5	1997
	Anthony Henry	5	2000
	J.R. Reed	5	2001
	Ron Hemingway	5	2002
	Devin Abraham	5	2017

Single game
Rank	Player	Ints	Year	Opponent
1	J.R. Reed	3	2003	Memphis

=== Tackles ===
Career
Rank	Player	Tackles	Years
1	Auggie Sanchez	388	2014 2015 2016 2017
2	Kawika Mitchell	367	1999 2000 2001 2002
3	DeDe Lattimore	337	2010 2011 2012 2013
4	Ben Moffitt	335	2004 2005 2006 2007
5	Stephen Nicholas	326	2003 2004 2005 2006
6	Roy Manns	317	1997 1998 1999 2000
7	Dwayne Boyles	308	2018 2019 2020 2021 2022
8	J.R. Reed	301	2000 2001 2002 2003
9	Maurice Jones	285	2000 2001 2002 2003
10	Anthony Williams	276	1998 1999 2000 2001

Single season
Rank	Player	Tackles	Year
1	Tyrone McKenzie	121	2007
2	Auggie Sanchez	120	2016
3	Kawika Mitchell	117	2002
	Auggie Sanchez	117	2015
5	Maurice Jones	116	2003
	Tyrone McKenzie	116	2008
7	Ben Moffitt	112	2006
8	Khalid McGee	111	2018
9	Dwayne Boyles	108	2022
10	Kawika Mitchell	106	2001

Single game
Rank	Player	Tackles	Year	Opponent
1	J.R. Reed	19	2003	Cincinnati
2	Anthony Henry	18	1999	James Madison
	Maurice Jones	18	2003	Alabama
	Tyrone McKenzie	18	2007	Pittsburgh
	Kion Wilson	18	2009	Rutgers
	DeDe Lattimore	18	2013	Rutgers

=== Sacks ===
Career
Rank	Player	Sacks	Years
1	George Selvie	29.0	2006 2007 2008 2009
2	Stephen Nicholas	20.0	2003 2004 2005 2006
3	Terrence Royal	19.5	2002 2003 2004 2005
	Ryne Giddins	19.5	2009 2010 2011 2012 2013
5	Shurron Pierson	18.0	2001 2002
	Bruce Hector	18.0	2015 2016 2017
7	Shawn Hay	17.0	1997 1998 1999 2000
8	DeDe Lattimore	15.0	2010 2011 2012 2013
9	Greg Walls	14.5	1999 2000 2001 2002
10	Chris Daley	13.5	1999 2000 2001 2002

Single season
Rank	Player	Sacks	Year
1	George Selvie	14.5	2007
2	Shurron Pierson	10.0	2001
	Terrence Royal	10.0	2005
4	Chris Daley	9.5	2001
5	Shawn Hay	8.0	1997
	Demetrius Woods	8.0	1997
	Shurron Pierson	8.0	2002
	Jason Allen	8.0	2005
9	Stephen Nicholas	7.5	2006
10	Stephen Nicholas	7.0	2005
	Chris Robinson	7.0	2006
	DeDe Lattimore	7.0	2011
	Bruce Hector	7.0	2017

Single game
Rank	Player	Sacks	Year	Opponent
1	Shurron Pierson	4.0	2002	Southern Miss
	George Selvie	4.0	2007	Elon
	C.J. Hicks	4.0	2026	UAB

== Kicking ==
=== Field goals made ===
Career
Rank	Player	FGs	Years
1	Maikon Bonani	69	2008 2010 2011 2012
2	Emilio Nadelman	43	2015 2016 2017
3	Santiago Gramática	38	2001 2002 2003 2004
4	Nico Gramática	37	2024 2025 2026
5	Bill Gramática	36	1998 1999 2000
6	Marvin Kloss	31	2011 2012 2013 2014
7	Spencer Shrader	28	2019 2020 2021 2022
8	Delbert Alvarado	26	2006 2007 2008 2009
9	John Cannon	23	2023 2024
10	Coby Weiss	18	2018 2019

Single season
Rank	Player	FGs	Year
1	Emilio Nadelman	21	2017
2	Delbert Alvarado	19	2007
	Maikon Bonani	19	2011
4	Maikon Bonani	18	2012
	Marvin Kloss	18	2013
	Nico Gramática	18	2025
7	Maikon Bonani	17	2010
8	Bill Gramática	16	1998
	Bill Gramática	16	2000
	Santiago Gramática	16	2002

Single game
Rank	Player	FGs	Year	Opponent
1	Maikon Bonani	5	2012	Syracuse
	Emilio Nadelman	5	2017	Temple

=== Field goal percentage ===
Career
Rank	Player	FG%	Years
1	Coby Weiss	78.3%	2018 2019
2	Emilio Nadelman	78.2%	2015 2016 2017
3	Marvin Kloss	77.5%	2011 2012 2013 2014
4	Nico Gramática	77.1%	2024 2025 2026
5	Maikon Bonani	75.8%	2008 2010 2011 2012
6	John Cannon	71.9%	2023 2024
7	Kyle Bronson	68.8%	2005
8	Spencer Shrader	68.3%	2019 2020 2021 2022
9	Bill Gramática	67.9%	1998 1999 2000
10	Steve Riggs	65.2%	1997

Single season
Rank	Player	FG%	Year
1	Emilio Nadelman	100%	2016
2	Spencer Shrader	84.6%	2021
3	Emilio Nadelman	84.0%	2017
4	Coby Weiss	83.3%	2018
5	Maikon Bonani	81.0%	2010
6	Maikon Bonani	78.3%	2012
	Marvin Kloss	78.3%	2013
8	Marvin Kloss	76.5%	2014
9	Santiago Gramática	76.2%	2002
10	John Cannon	75.0%	2024
	Nico Gramática	75.0%	2025
