= List of South Florida Bulls in the NFL draft =

This is a list of University of South Florida Bulls in the NFL Draft.

== Key ==
B	Back	K	Kicker	NT	Nose tackle
C	Center	LB	Linebacker	FB	Fullback
DB	Defensive back	P	Punter	HB	Halfback
DE	Defensive end	QB	Quarterback	WR	Wide receiver
DT	Defensive tackle	RB	Running back	G	Guard
E	End	T	Offensive tackle	TE	Tight end

== Selections ==
Year	Round	Pick	Player	Team	Position
2001	4	96	Kenyatta Jones	New England Patriots	DT
2001	4	97	Anthony Henry	Cleveland Browns	DB
2001	4	98	Bill Gramatica	Arizona Cardinals	K
2003	2	47	Kawika Mitchell	Kansas City Chiefs	LB
2003	4	129	Shurron Pierson	Oakland Raiders	DE
2003	7	253	DeAndrew Rubin	Green Bay Packers	WR
2004	4	129	J. R. Reed	Philadelphia Eagles	DB
2007	4	109	Stephen Nicholas	Atlanta Falcons	LB
2008	1	25	Mike Jenkins	Dallas Cowboys	DB
2008	5	159	Trae Williams	Jacksonville Jaguars	DB
2009	3	97	Tyrone McKenzie	New England Patriots	LB
2010	1	15	Jason Pierre-Paul	New York Giants	DE
2010	2	37	Nate Allen	Philadelphia Eagles	DB
2010	3	65	Jerome Murphy	St. Louis Rams	DB
2010	6	177	Carlton Mitchell	Cleveland Browns	WR
2010	7	226	George Selvie	St. Louis Rams	DE
2011	3	65	Terrell McClain	Carolina Panthers	DT
2011	6	170	Mistral Raymond	Minnesota Vikings	DB
2011	6	202	Jacquian Williams	New York Giants	LB
2013	3	90	Kayvon Webster	Denver Broncos	DB
2013	7	232	Sam Barrington	Green Bay Packers	LB
2013	7	237	B. J. Daniels	San Francisco 49ers	QB
2014	5	150	Aaron Lynch	San Francisco 49ers	LB
2015	6	211	Reshard Cliett	Houston Texans	LB
2015	7	222	Austin Reiter	Washington Redskins	C
2017	4	143	Marlon Mack	Indianapolis Colts	RB
2017	5	170	Rodney Adams	Minnesota Vikings	WR
2017	6	212	Kofi Amichia	Green Bay Packers	T
2018	3	90	Deadrin Senat	Atlanta Falcons	DT
2018	5	174	Marquez Valdes-Scantling	Green Bay Packers	WR
