= List of South Florida Bulls football seasons =

The South Florida Bulls football team represents the University of South Florida in American football.

== Seasons ==
Year	Coach	Overall	Conference	Standing	Bowl/playoffs	Coaches^{#}	AP^{°}
Jim Leavitt (I-AA Independent) (1997–2000)
1997	Jim Leavitt	5–6					
1998	Jim Leavitt	8–3					22
1999	Jim Leavitt	7–4					23
2000	Jim Leavitt	7–4					
Jim Leavitt (I-A Independent) (2001–2002)
2001	Jim Leavitt	8–3					
2002	Jim Leavitt	9–2					
Jim Leavitt (Conference USA) (2003–2004)
2003	Jim Leavitt	7–4	5–3	T–3rd			
2004	Jim Leavitt	4–7	3–5	T–6th			
Jim Leavitt (Big East) (2005–2009)
2005	Jim Leavitt	6–6	4–3	T–3rd	L Meineke Car Care		
2006	Jim Leavitt	9–4	4–3	T–4th	W PapaJohns.com		
2007	Jim Leavitt	9–4	4–3	T–3rd	L Sun		
2008	Jim Leavitt	8–5	2–5	6th	W St. Petersburg		
2009	Jim Leavitt	8–5	3–4	T–4th	W International		
Skip Holtz (Big East) (2010–2012)
2010	Skip Holtz	8–5	3–4	T–5th	W Meineke Car Care		
2011	Skip Holtz	5–7	1–6	T–7th			
2012	Skip Holtz	3–9	1–6	T–8th			
Willie Taggart (American Athletic) (2013–2016)
2013	Willie Taggart	2–10	2–6	8th			
2014	Willie Taggart	4–8	3–5	7th			
2015	Willie Taggart	8–5	6–2	2nd (East)	L Miami Beach		
2016	Willie Taggart	11–2	7–1	T–1st (East)	W Birmingham	19	19
Charlie Strong (American Athletic) (2017–2019)
2017	Charlie Strong	10–2	6–2	2nd (East)	W Birmingham	21	21
2018	Charlie Strong	7–6	3–5	4th (East)	L Gasparilla		
2019	Charlie Strong	4–8	2–6	4th (East)			
Jeff Scott (American Athletic) (2020–2022)
2020	Jeff Scott	1–8	0–7	11th			
2021	Jeff Scott	2–10	1–7	T–9th			
2022	Jeff Scott	1–11	0–8	11th			
Alex Golesh (American Athletic) (2023–2025)
2023	Alex Golesh	7–6	4–4	T–5th	W Boca Raton		
2024	Alex Golesh	7–6	4–4	T–6th	W Hawaii		
2025	Alex Golesh	9–4	6–2	4th	L Cure		
Brian Hartline (American Athletic) (2026–present)
2026	Brian Hartline	6–5	2–5				
Total:		190–169					
National championship Conference title Conference division title or championship game berth
^{†}Indicates Bowl Coalition, Bowl Alliance, BCS, or CFP / New Years' Six bowl.; ^{#}Rankings from final Coaches Poll.
