= 2002 South Florida Bulls football team =

American college football season

2002 South Florida Bulls football
- Conference: Independent
- Record: 9–2
- Head coach: Jim Leavitt (6th season)
- Offensive coordinator: Mike Hobbie (2nd season)
- Offensive scheme: Multiple
- Co-defensive coordinators: Rick Kravitz (6th season); Wally Burnham (2nd season)
- Base defense: 3–4
- Home stadium: Raymond James Stadium

2002 NCAA Division I-A independents football records
	Conf.			Overall
Team	W		L	W		L
South Florida		–		9	–	2
No. 17 Notre Dame		–		10	–	3
Connecticut		–		6	–	6
Utah State		–		4	–	7
Troy State		–		4	–	8
Navy		–		2	–	10
Rankings from AP Poll

The 2002 South Florida Bulls football team represented the University of South Florida (USF) in the 2002 NCAA Division I-A football season, and was the sixth team fielded by the school. The Bulls were led by head coach Jim Leavitt in his sixth year, played their home games at Raymond James Stadium in Tampa, Florida and competed as a Division I-A Independent. The Bulls finished the season with a record of nine wins and two losses (9–2). However, the Bulls did not participate in a bowl game. They were offered a spot in the 2002 Seattle Bowl (after initially being publicly denied a spot in it by the executive director of the bowl) but declined it due to how they would have had to pay the bowl $2 million to play in it, as the bowl was only extending a spot to the Bulls so they would cover the financial woes of the game.

== Schedule ==
Date	Time	Opponent	Site	TV	Result	Attendance	Source
August 29	7:00 p.m.	Florida Atlantic	Raymond James Stadium; Tampa, FL (rivalry)		W 51–10	22,074	
September 7	7:00 p.m.	Northern Illinois	Raymond James Stadium; Tampa, FL		W 37–6	23,559	
September 14	7:00 p.m.	at Arkansas	War Memorial Stadium; Little Rock, AR	WMOR	L 3–42	55,817	
September 28	7:00 p.m.	at No. 2 Oklahoma	Gaylord Family Oklahoma Memorial Stadium; Norman, OK	TBS	L 14–31	74,432	
October 5	8:05 p.m.	at North Texas	Fouts Field; Denton, TX	WMOR	W 24–17	15,512	
October 12	7:00 p.m.	Southern Miss	Raymond James Stadium; Tampa, FL	FSN	W 16–13	28,181	
October 19	2:00 p.m.	at East Carolina	Dowdy–Ficklen Stadium; Greenville, NC	FSN	W 46–30	33,419	
November 2	7:00 p.m.	Charleston Southern	Raymond James Stadium; Tampa, FL		W 56–6	23,144	
November 9	7:00 p.m.	Memphis^{†}	Raymond James Stadium; Tampa, FL		W 31–28	32,270	
November 16	7:00 p.m.	Bowling Green	Raymond James Stadium; Tampa, FL		W 29–7	28,098	
November 23	3:00 p.m.	at Houston	Robertson Stadium; Houston, TX	FSN	W 32–14	12,856	
^{†}Homecoming; Rankings from AP Poll released prior to the game; All times are in Eastern time

== Roster ==
2002 South Florida Bulls football team roster
Players
Coaches
Offense

Pos.	#	Name	Class
QB	10	Marquel Blackwell	Sr
OT	72	Ken Dawson	Sr
RB	26	Billy Henderson	So
C	71	Alex Herron	So
WR	22	Elgin Hicks	Jr
WR	4	DeAndrew Rubin	Sr
WR	2	Hugh Smith	Sr
WR	15	Huey Whittaker	Jr
WR	86	Bryan Williams	Fr

Defense

Pos.	#	Name	Class
DL	55	Cedric Battles	Jr
LB	51	Devon Davis	Fr
DE	53	Julian Johnson	Sr
LB	52	Mike Minus	Jr
LB	5	Kawika Mitchell	Sr
DL	54	Emerson Morris	Sr
LB	50	Stephen Nicholas	Fr
DE	41	Shurron Pierson	Sr
DB	32	J. R. Reed	Jr
DL	93	Lee Roy Selmon	Jr
DB	21	Maurice Tucker	Sr
DB	17	Kevin Verpaele	Jr
DL	8	Greg Walls	Sr
DB	24	Antonio Warren	So

Special teams

Pos.	#	Name	Class
K	7	Santiago Gramatica	So

Head coach

- Jim Leavitt

Coordinators/assistant coaches

Legend

- (C) Team captain
- (S) Suspended
- (I) Ineligible
- Injured
- Redshirt

Roster

== Team players in the NFL ==
Player	Position	Round	Pick	NFL club
Kawika Mitchell	Linebacker	2	47	Kansas City Chiefs
Shurron Pierson	Defensive end	4	129	Oakland Raiders
DeAndrew Rubin	Wide receiver	7	253	Green Bay Packers
