= Matt Grothe =

American gridiron football player (born 1986)

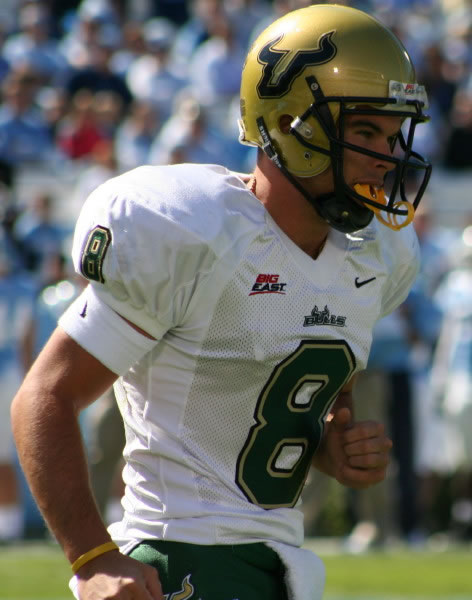

No. 8
- Position: Quarterback

Personal information
- Born: September 8, 1986 (age 40); Lakeland, Florida, U.S.
- Listed height: 6 ft 0 in (1.83 m)
- Listed weight: 205 lb (93 kg)

Career information
- High school: Lake Gibson (Lakeland)
- College: South Florida (2005–2009)
- NFL draft: 2010: undrafted

Career history
- Florida Tuskers (2010)*; Toronto Argonauts (2010)*; Tampa Bay Storm (2011–2012); Orlando Predators (2012)
- * Offseason or practice squad member only

Awards and highlights
- Big East Rookie of the Year (2006)

Career AFL statistics
- Completions: 29
- Attempts: 58
- Yards: 440
- Touchdowns: 10
- Interceptions: 2
- Stats at ArenaFan.com

Matt Grothe (born September 8, 1986) is an American former football quarterback. He played college football for the South Florida Bulls. He was a member of the Florida Tuskers of the United Football League (UFL); the Toronto Argonauts of the Canadian Football League (CFL) and Arena Football League (AFL) teams Tampa Bay Storm and the Orlando Predators.

== Early life ==
Grothe attended Lake Gibson High School in Lakeland, Florida and was a letterman in football. In football, he was a two-time first team Class 4A All-State selection, was named the Lakeland Ledger Player of the Year twice, and as a senior, he was named to the Super Southern 100 by the Atlanta Journal-Constitution, was named the Class 4A Player of the Year, finished 2nd by the closest margin ever for Mr. Football in the state of Florida, and was named the Old Spice Red Zone Player of the Year. Grothe led his team to the state championship football game against Armwood High School. Grothe passed for 2,700 yards and ran for 1,250 yards as a senior. He passed for 33 touchdowns and rushed for 15 touchdowns. After his senior season, he was named the 21st best prospect in Florida by the Tampa Tribune, named the 23rd best prospect in Florida by the Orlando Sentinel, and Rivals.com ranked him as the 24th best dual-threat quarterback in the country and 93rd best overall prospect in the state of Florida. Grothe graduated from Lake Gibson High School in 2005 with a 4.0 grade point average. He also began studying karate as a child and eventually obtained a 2nd degree black belt.

== College career ==
=== 2005 season ===
Grothe spent the 2005 campaign as a redshirt behind then-quarterback Pat Julmiste.

=== 2006 season ===
The 2006 season marked Grothe's first action on the football team after redshirting all of USF's 2005 bowl season. He won the starting quarterback spot over senior Pat Julmiste in the first game of 2006 against McNeese State. The national buzz continued for Grothe, the 2006 Big East Conference Rookie of the Year, after he led his team to an upset of No. 7 West Virginia on the road in Morgantown, West Virginia. In his first post-season appearance, he led USF to the 2006 PapaJohns.com Bowl against East Carolina. Although Grothe missed the entire second half of the game with a shin injury (after being up 24–7), the Bulls claimed their first-ever bowl victory by a score of 24–7.

Sports television channel ESPN named Grothe the "biggest surprise" in all of the Big East for the 2006 football season. In total offensive yards, Grothe accumulated an average of 246 yards per game, second to only Louisville's Brian Brohm in 2006 Big East play. Nationally, he ranked seventeenth in total offense for 2006 and was the 2nd ranked freshman in the country in that category.

=== 2007 season ===
Grothe was named to the Maxwell Award watch list, the first USF player ever named to the list. Grothe was also named to the Manning Award watch list, given to college football's top quarterback. Grothe led the Bulls to a 9–4 record in the 2007 season, including a 26–23 victory over No. 18 Auburn in Alabama on September 8, 2007(also his 21st birthday) and a 21–13 victory over No. 5 West Virginia at home on September 29, 2007. On October 14, 2007, Grothe was at the helm as the Bulls rose to a No. 2 BCS ranking in the nation, the highest school ranking in history. The team ended the 2007 regular season ranked 21st in the BCS.

Grothe broke his own record for passing yards in a game with 382 in a 38–33 loss to Cincinnati, and had a career-long 80-yard touchdown run against Pittsburgh on November 24, 2007. He finished the 2007 regular season with 22 all-purpose touchdowns against only 14 interceptions.

Grothe and the Bulls accepted an invitation to the Brut Sun Bowl in El Paso, Texas where they lost to the Oregon on December 31, 2007.

=== 2008 season ===
Entering 2008, Grothe was named to both the Maxwell Award preseason watch list and the Davey O'Brien National Quarterback Award watch list. He finished the season with career highs in touchdown passes (18), passing yards (2,911), completions (240), and passing yards per game (223.9). He also led the team with 591 yards rushing and four rushing touchdowns. Grothe led the Big East in total offense (269.4 yards per game), and ranked 21st nationally in that category.

=== 2009 season ===
Grothe started the 2009 season with wins against Wofford and Western Kentucky. However, on September 19, 2009, during a game against Charleston Southern University, Grothe injured his left knee just before halftime. The next day, it was announced Grothe would miss the remainder of the 2009 season due to a torn ACL.

=== College statistics ===
Year	Team	Games			Passing								Rushing			
Year	Team	GP	GS	Record	Comp	Att	Pct	Yards	Avg	TD	Int	Rate	Att	Yards	Avg	TD
2005	South Florida	Redshirt (redshirt)														
2006	South Florida	13	12	8−4	202	317	63.7	2,576	8.1	15	14	138.8	178	622	3.5	9
2007	South Florida	13	13	9−4	232	392	59.2	2,670	6.8	14	14	121.0	198	872	4.4	10
2008	South Florida	13	13	8−5	240	380	63.2	2,911	7.7	18	14	135.8	146	591	4.0	4
2009	South Florida	3	3	3−0	43	59	72.9	512	8.7	5	2	167.0	23	121	5.3	0
Career		42	41	28−13	717	1,148	62.4	8,669	7.6	52	44	140.7	545	2,206	4.0	23

=== Records and accolades ===
At South Florida, Grothe surpassed 3,000 yards of total offense in his first full season and passed for more than 2,400, breaking both school records formerly held by Marquel Blackwell. On December 1, 2006, the Sporting News magazine named Grothe the 2006 Big East Freshman of the Year, as well as naming him to the Big East All-Freshman team. The Tampa Tribune also named Grothe the Big East Rookie of the Year.

- 2006 Big East Rookie of the Year
- 2006 Sporting News Big East Freshman of the Year
- 2006 Sporting News Big East All-Freshman Team
- 2006 Scout.com All-American Freshman Team (2nd team)
- 2006 Tampa Tribune Big East Freshman of the Year
- 2007 Nationalchamps.net Heisman Watch Candidate
- 2007 Maxwell Award Watch List
- 2007 Manning Award Watch List
- 2008 Maxwell Award Watch List (2nd time)
- 2008 Davey O'Brien National Quarterback Award Watch List
- 2008 Big East Offensive Player of the Week on 9/8/2008
- 2008 Big East Offensive Player of the Week on 9/29/2008
- 2008 St. Petersburg Bowl MVP of the Game

== Professional career ==
After going undrafted in the 2010 NFL draft, Grothe signed with the Florida Tuskers of the United Football League on June 4, 2010. He was released by the Tuskers on September 6, 2010.

On October 6, 2010, Grothe signed a practice roster agreement with the Toronto Argonauts of the Canadian Football League. He was released by the Argonauts on November 4, 2010. As of December 8, Grothe was put back on the Argos 2011 roster. On May 27, 2011, Grothe was released once more by the Argonauts.

Grothe made his Arena Football League (AFL) debut on July 16, 2011. He took over in the third quarter against the Georgia Force and went on to throw 5 touchdown passes. On his first pass attempt, he connected for a 40-yard score. Former South Florida teammate Amarri Jackson caught three of Grothe's five touchdown passes. In his 2 appearances with the Storm, Grothe completed 38 passes of 67 attempts for 440 yards with 10 touchdowns and 2 interceptions.

Grothe signed with the Orlando Predators of the AFL on June 6, 2012.

== Personal life ==
Grothe was born the eldest of three children to Brenda and Matt Grothe. His siblings include brothers Chris and David. His hobbies mostly involve outdoor activities including hunting and fishing.

On December 19, 2015, Grothe reportedly assaulted a man in an altercation at his Odessa, Florida residence. After learning of a warrant for his arrest, Grothe turned himself over to the Hillsborough County Sheriff's Office on February 16, 2016. He was later released on a $2,000 bond.
