= 2001 South Florida Bulls football team =

American college football season

2001 South Florida Bulls football
- Conference: Independent
- Record: 8–3
- Head coach: Jim Leavitt (5th season)
- Offensive coordinator: Mike Hobbie (1st season)
- Offensive scheme: Multiple
- Co-defensive coordinators: Rick Kravitz (5th season); Wally Burnham (1st season)
- Base defense: 3–4
- Home stadium: Raymond James Stadium

2001 NCAA Division I-A independents football records
	Conf.			Overall
Team	W		L	W		L
South Florida		–		8	–	3
Troy State		–		7	–	4
UCF		–		6	–	5
Notre Dame		–		5	–	6
Utah State		–		4	–	7
Connecticut		–		2	–	9
Navy		–		0	–	10
Rankings from AP Poll

The 2001 South Florida Bulls football team represented the University of South Florida (USF) as an independent during the 2001 NCAA Division I-A football season. Led by fifth-year head coach Jim Leavitt, the Bulls compiled a record of 8–3. South Florida played home games at Raymond James Stadium in Tampa, Florida.

== Schedule ==
Date	Time	Opponent	Site	TV	Result	Attendance	Source
August 30	7:30 p.m.	at Northern Illinois	Huskie Stadium; DeKalb, IL	FSNF	L 17–20	14,426	
September 8	1:30 p.m.	at Pittsburgh	Heinz Field; Pittsburgh, PA	FSNF	W 35–26	39,542	
September 22	8:00 p.m.	at Memphis	Liberty Bowl Memorial Stadium; Memphis, TN	WMOR	L 9–17	26,488	
September 29	7:00 p.m.	North Texas	Raymond James Stadium; Tampa, FL		W 28–10	25,156	
October 6	8:00 p.m.	at Utah	Rice–Eccles Stadium; Salt Lake City, UT	WMOR	L 21–52	30,818	
October 13	7:00 p.m.	Connecticut	Raymond James Stadium; Tampa, FL		W 40–21	26,802	
October 20	7:00 p.m.	Southern Utah	Raymond James Stadium; Tampa, FL		W 42–12	26,624	
October 27	7:00 p.m.	Liberty	Raymond James Stadium; Tampa, FL	FSNF	W 68–37	21,056	
November 3	7:00 p.m.	Houston^{†}	Raymond James Stadium; Tampa, FL	Fox Sports South	W 45–6	32,711	
November 10	7:00 p.m.	Western Illinois	Raymond James Stadium; Tampa, FL		W 48–17	23,252	
November 24	7:00 p.m.	Utah State	Raymond James Stadium; Tampa, FL		W 34–13	25,136	
^{†}Homecoming; All times are in Eastern time

== Roster ==
2001 South Florida Bulls football team roster
Players
Coaches
Offense

Pos.	#	Name	Class
WR	4	DeAndrew Rubin	Jr

Defense

Pos.	#	Name	Class
LB	5	Kawika Mitchell	Jr
DE	41	Shurron Pierson	Jr
DB	32	J. R. Reed	So

Special teams

Pos.	#	Name	Class

Head coach

- Jim Leavitt

Coordinators/assistant coaches

Legend

- (C) Team captain
- (S) Suspended
- (I) Ineligible
- Injured
- Redshirt

Roster
