= 2005 Meineke Car Care Bowl =

South Florida Bulls	NC State Wolfpack
(6–5)	(6–5)
Big East	ACC
0	14
Head coach: Jim Leavitt	Head coach: Chuck Amato
	1	2	3	4	Total
South Florida	0	0	0	0	0
NC State	0	14	0	0	14
- Date: December 31, 2005
- Season: 2005
- Stadium: Bank of America Stadium
- Location: Charlotte, North Carolina
- MVP: LB Stephen Tulloch (NC State)
- Referee: Dennis Lipski (Big Ten)
- Attendance: 57,937

United States TV coverage
- Network: ESPN2
- Announcers: Eric Collins; Andre Ware

The 2005 Meineke Car Care Bowl featured the South Florida Bulls and the NC State Wolfpack. The game was the fourth edition to this bowl game, as well as the first shutout in the game's history. The game was played on Saturday, December 31, 2005, and kickoff was at 11:00 AM EST. It remained the only shutout South Florida ever suffered, until November 12, 2009 when South Florida lost to Rutgers 31–0 for its first shutout in South Florida's regular season. South Florida was in its first bowl in program history.

The game was a defensive slugfest the entire way through. Quarterback Marcus Stone threw a 9-yard touchdown pass to Brian Clark to put NC State up 7–0. With 19 seconds left in the half, Andre Brown scored on a 1-yard touchdown run. South Florida had scoring chances, but did not capitalize on any. They lost two fumbles and one interception in the end zone.

NC State capped a marvelous finish, finishing at 7–5, after starting the season 2–4. South Florida finished the game with 295 yards of total offense, including 118 rushing yards by Andre Hall. Overall, NC State's defense played magnificently. Stephen Tulloch was named the game's MVP by recording 15 tackles, three sacks, and one forced fumble.
