= Hollins High School =

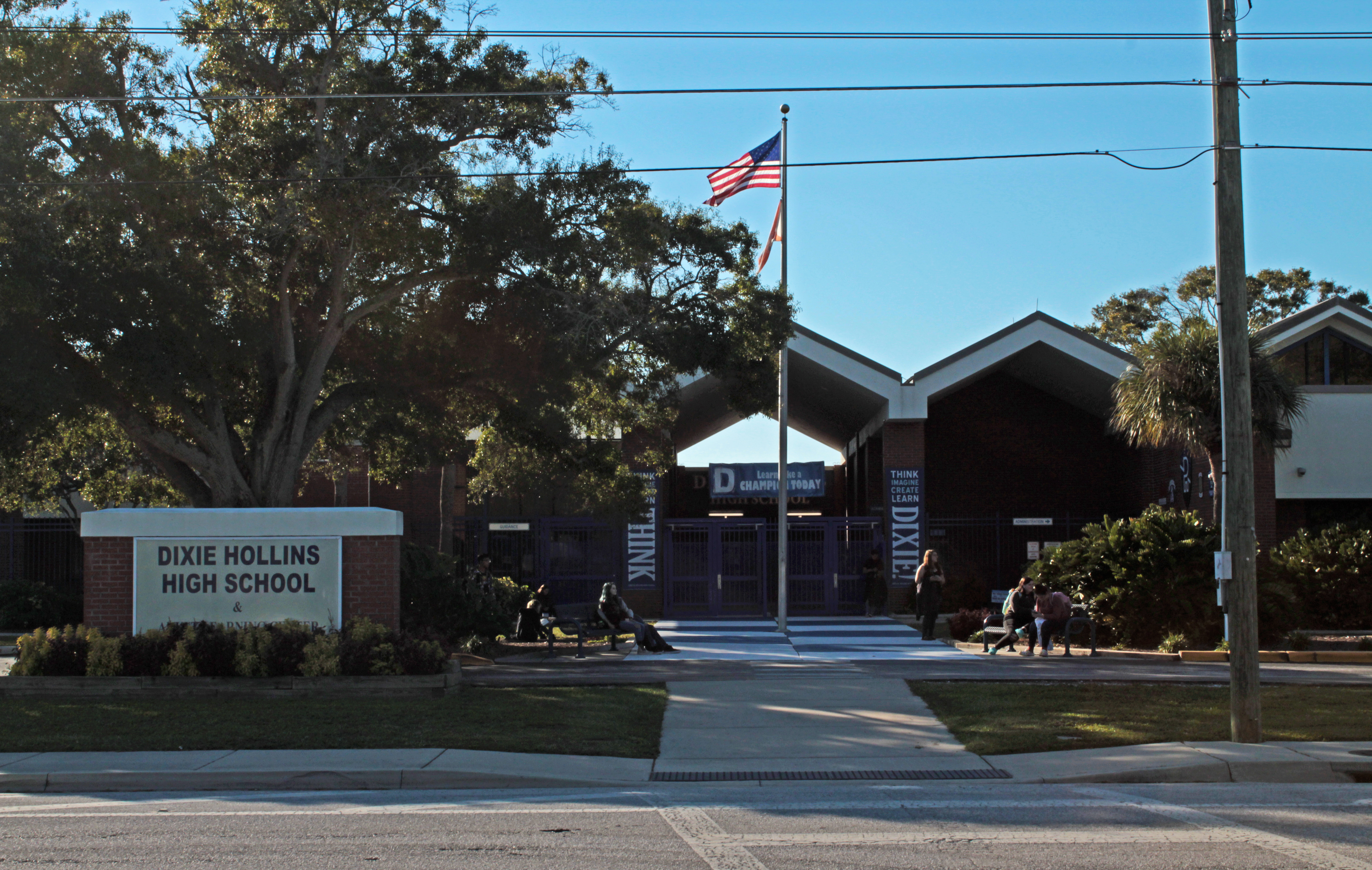

Location
- 4940 62nd St N St. Petersburg, Florida 33709; United States; 27.81617°N 82.72097°W

Information
- Former name: Dixie M. Hollins High School (DHHS)
- Type: Public high school
- Established: 1959
- School district: Pinellas County Schools
- Principal: Candice Metcalf
- Teaching staff: 96.00 (FTE)
- Grades: 9–12
- Enrollment: 1,975 (2023-2024)
- Student to teacher ratio: 20.57
- Colors: Royal blue and white
- Nickname: Royals
- Website: www.pcsb.org/dixie-hs

Hollins High School, formerly known as Dixie M. Hollins High School, is a public secondary school located in St. Petersburg, Florida, United States. The school was opened in 1959 as a vocational school for grades 10–12, but it has since expanded to include 9th grade education. The school has approximately 1,975 students.

Its graphic arts program, known as the Academy of Entertainment Arts (AEA), is designated as a center of excellence. The school also offers a program in the culinary arts, which is also designated as a center of excellence. The school also has a Cambridge/AICE magnet program and also allows non-magnet students to enroll in AICE-level classes. Junior Reserve Officers' Training Corps (JROTC), Advancement Via Individual Determination (AVID), business and career technical classes, cosmetology, and machinery are also offered as elective courses. Additionally, Hollins has a wide array of Advanced Placement (AP) classes, with over half of students taking at least one AP class.

Hollins High School is currently under the leadership of Principal Candice Metcalf, who took the role in 2024.

== History ==
When Pinellas County separated from Hillsborough County and became its own entity in 1912, Dixie Martin Hollins was appointed as Superintendent of Pinellas County Schools; he was about twenty-five years old. Hollins was considered progressive for his time, said the school's principal in 2020, Robert Florio, citing his advocacy of equality in education and hiring of graduates from historically black colleges and universities. Hollins promoted the rights of black students to have certified teachers, to attend a full school day, and to attend school for more than just a few months per year. When Hollins High School opened its doors for the first time in the fall of 1959, it was named Northwest High School. Almost immediately the School Board decided to name the new high school after Dixie Hollins. His family owned and operated one of the largest ranches in the state in Citrus County from 1942 until 1992 when all but a small portion was sold upon the death of his son, Maurice L. Hollins. Dixie Hollins donated land for both Madeira Beach Elementary and Middle Schools. His estate continues to provide contributions to Hollins High's music program.

In 1971, the school became national news when the campus became embroiled in a community protest against racial integration through forced busing. The unrest had been building for several weeks. When the school decided to ban the use of the Confederate flag, community groups began picketing the school. The unrest broke out into violence on October 12, 1971. When Florida schools mandated kindergarten, Dixie Hollins High School incorporated 9th grade into its curriculum. The school underwent extensive renovations in 1992–1996, adding a two-story science wing, a new media center and cafeteria, an art building, a music building, and upgrading the existing classrooms, the gymnasium, and the vocational wing.

=== Name and mascot ===
The school was named after Dixie Martin Hollins. Its original mascot, "the Rebel"—an aged, white-haired colonel—was a play on the relationship between the term "Dixie" and the Confederate States. In 1989, the Rebel was subjected to criticism as a racist symbol, but the student body at the time voted to keep the mascot unchanged.

In 2020, a student group created a petition on Change.org that called for the school's name and mascot to be changed, citing the "Dixie"/Confederacy connection as well as the mascot's resemblance to a Confederate soldier. Following the petition, the school's name was changed from Dixie Hollins High School to Hollins High School, and the "Rebels" moniker used for the school's athletic teams was changed to "Royals," depicted by a lion.

== Notable alumni ==
- Kurt Abbott, baseball player
- Marquel Blackwell, football player
- Erroll M. Brown, first African-American admiral, United States Coast Guard
- Michele Elliott, author, psychologist and founder of child protection charity Kidscape
- Andre Hall, football player
- Dametri Hill, basketball player
- Nate Johnson, football player
- Gary Keller, basketball player
- Bill Kirchenbauer, actor, comedian, producer
- Jim Leavitt, football player, college and professional football coach
- Jesse Litsch (born March 9, 1985) is an American former professional baseball pitcher.
- DeAndrew Rubin, football player
- Roy Smith (born May 18, 1976) is an American former professional baseball pitcher.
- Buzz Sawyer, professional wrestler
- Korey Veeder, soccer player
- Fred Williams, football player
