= Freddie Williams (Canadian football) =

American gridiron football player (1955–2014)

Profile
- Position: Running back

Personal information
- Born: September 2, 1955; St. Petersburg, Florida, U.S.
- Died: May 14, 2014 (aged 58); Phoenix, Arizona, U.S.
- Listed height: 5 ft 10 in (1.78 m)
- Listed weight: 189 lb (86 kg)

Career information
- High school: Dixie Hollins (St. Petersburg)
- College: Arizona State
- NFL draft: 1977: 8th round, 221st overall pick

Career history
- Dallas Cowboys (1977)*; Saskatchewan Roughriders (1977)
- * Offseason or practice squad member only

Awards and highlights
- 2× All-WAC (1974, 1975)

Freddie Williams Jr. (September 2, 1955 – May 14, 2014) was an American football running back in the Canadian Football League (CFL) for the Saskatchewan Roughriders. He played college football at Arizona State University.

== Early life ==
Williams attended Dixie Hollins High School. He accepted a football scholarship from Arizona State University. His teammates gave him the nickname "Fast Freddie".

As a sophomore, he was named the starter at running back after Woody Green graduated. He had a breakout season, leading the Western Athletic Conference in several categories. He posted 249 carries (led the conference), 1,299 rushing yards (led the conference), a 5.2-yard average (led the conference) and 8 rushing touchdowns (second in the conference). He had 23 carries for 216 yards (ninth in school history) and 2 rushing touchdowns against UTEP.

As a junior, he helped the team finish with an undefeated record (12–0), ranking No. 2 in both the AP Poll and the Coaches Poll, whis is the highest ranking in school history. The season included a dramatic 17-14 Fiesta Bowl win over Nebraska. Williams also had one of the best rushing seasons in school history, tallying 266 carries (school record) for 1,427 yards, a 5.4-yard average, 9 rushing touchdowns and 8 100-yard games.

As a senior, he was limited with an ankle injury, registering 102 carries (second on the team) for 523 rushing yards (led the team), a 5.1-yard average (led the team), without scoring a touchdown. He finished second in school history with 648 carries for 3,381 rushing yards and 17 100-yard games, while also averaging 5.4 per carry and scoring 19 touchdowns.

In 2002, he was inducted into the Arizona State University Sports Hall of Fame.

== Professional career ==
Williams was selected by the Dallas Cowboys in the eighth round (221st overall) of the 1977 NFL draft. He was waived on August 1.

In August 1977, he signed with the Saskatchewan Roughriders of the Canadian Football League. In his debut against the Calgary Stampeders, he had 87 rushing yards, a 6.7-yard average and 2 touchdowns. In his second game against the Winnipeg Blue Bombers, he suffered torn ligaments in his left ankle and did not return to play during the season.

== Personal life ==
Williams died on May 14, 2014.
