= Andre Davis (wide receiver, born 1993) =

American football player (born 1993)

No. 11
- Position: Wide receiver

Personal information
- Born: September 1, 1993 (age 33); Tampa, Florida, U.S.
- Listed height: 6 ft 1 in (1.85 m)
- Listed weight: 211 lb (96 kg)

Career information
- High school: Thomas Jefferson (Tampa, Florida)
- College: South Florida
- NFL draft: 2015: undrafted

Career history
- Buffalo Bills (2015)*; Tampa Bay Buccaneers (2015–2016)*; Tampa Bay Tornadoes (2021–present)
- * Offseason or practice squad member only

Andre Davis (born September 1, 1993) is an American professional football player who is a wide receiver for the Tampa Bay Tornadoes. He played college football at South Florida and has played for the Tampa Bay Buccaneers.

== Professional career ==
=== Tampa Bay Buccaneers ===
Davis was signed on October 28, 2015. He was waived on April 29, 2016. On May 9, 2016, he was re-signed by the Buccaneers. On August 28, 2016, Davis was waived by the Buccaneers.
