= Chad Barnhardt =

American football player (born 1976)

Profile
- Position: Quarterback

Personal information
- Born: January 21, 1976 (age 50); Lake Wales, Florida, U.S.
- Listed height: 6 ft 1 in (1.85 m)
- Listed weight: 220 lb (100 kg)

Career information
- High school: Lake Wales (FL)
- College: South Carolina, South Florida
- NFL draft: 1999: undrafted

Steven Chad Barnhardt (born January 21, 1976) is an American former football quarterback. Barnhardt was a backup for the South Carolina Gamecocks, before transferring and becoming the first starting quarterback for the South Florida Bulls.

Prior to playing for the Bulls, Barnhardt played a backup role for the South Carolina Gamecocks. Looking for a change and an opportunity to start, Barnhardt returned to his native Florida, and became the Bulls' starting quarterback. His legacy is mainly cemented on being the team's first starting quarterback. Additionally, Barnhardt brought credibility, leadership, and direction to the program. Due to this, he was considered "the perfect quarterback for a program trying to find itself." Playing 2 seasons for the team, Barnhardt threw for 4,138 yards and 27 touchdowns, while leading the Bulls to a 13–9 record when he started.

Barnhardt has also served various coaching tenures. After three seasons as the head coach of Lake Wales High School's football team, Barnhardt had a stint with the Bulls as a grad assistant on offense, and later as the offensive coordinator for the Webber International Warriors.

Outside of football, Barnhardt was a business major. Eventually, Barnhardt started to feel burned out from coaching and became the Vice President Commercial Loan Officer at CenterState Bank of Florida, N.A.

== Career statistics ==
Legend
**Bold**	Career high

Year	School	GP	Passing						
Year	School	GP	Cmp	Att	Pct	Yds	TD	Int	Rtg
1996	South Carolina	11	7	17	41.2	89	0	0	85.2
1997	South Florida	11	186	326	57.1	2,362	10	7	–
1998	South Florida	–	–	–	–	1,776	17	–	–
Statistics gathered from USF's official bio for Barnhardt, ESPN, and Sports-Reference.
