= Jim Leavitt =

American football player and coach (born 1956)

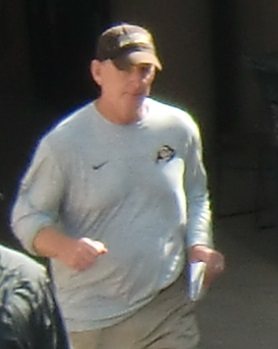
- Leavitt in 2016 at Stanford Stadium

Biographical details
- Born: December 5, 1956 (age 69); Harlingen, Texas, U.S.

Playing career
- 1974–1977: Missouri
- Position: Safety

Coaching career (HC unless noted)
- 1978–1979: Missouri (GA)
- 1980–1981: Dubuque (DC/LB)
- 1982: Morningside (ST)
- 1983–1987: Morningside (DC)
- 1988: Iowa (intern)
- 1989: Iowa (GA)
- 1990–1991: Kansas State (LB)
- 1992–1995: Kansas State (co-DC/LB)
- 1997–2009: South Florida
- 2011–2014: San Francisco 49ers (LB)
- 2015–2016: Colorado (DC/LB)
- 2017–2018: Oregon (DC/LB)
- 2019: Florida State (analyst)
- 2020: Florida Atlantic (DC)
- 2021: SMU (DC)

Head coaching record
- Overall: 95–57
- Bowls: 3–2

James Pierce Leavitt (born December 5, 1956) is an American college football coach and former player. He served as the head coach at the University of South Florida from the football program's inception in 1997 until 2009, compiling a record of 95–57.

== Early years ==
Leavitt grew up in St. Petersburg, Florida, and was a star quarterback for Dixie Hollins High School. After graduating from high school, Leavitt pursued studies at the University of Missouri, graduating in 1978. For the next two years, Leavitt worked as a graduate assistant. He then left for the University of Dubuque, where he spent two years as their football team's defensive coordinator. Following his years there, he went to Morningside College in 1982, spending one year as special teams coordinator before being promoted to defensive coordinator. After a brief stint at the University of Iowa where Leavitt pursued a doctorate degree in psychology, he followed Bill Snyder to Kansas State University in 1990. At Kansas State, Leavitt first spent one year as linebackers coach then five more as co-defensive coordinator, sharing the position with Bob Stoops. They led the Wildcats from relative obscurity to having a consistent, highly regarded defense.

== Coaching career ==
=== South Florida ===
On December 12, 1995, Leavitt was hired as head coach for the new football team at the University of South Florida. Leavitt signed his first class in 1996 for the first varsity season in 1997; all players redshirted in 1996. The South Florida Bulls football program began play as an independent at the NCAA Division I-AA (now FCS) level. After four seasons the program moved up to I-A (now FBS), also as an independent. After two years as a Division I-A independent, the Bulls joined Conference USA, but stayed for only two seasons. The Bulls landed in the Big East Conference prior to the start of the 2005 season. In December 2005, after the team's first season as members of the Big East, Leavitt led the Bulls to their 100th game and first ever bowl game at the Meineke Car Care Bowl in Charlotte, North Carolina. One year later, Leavitt led the team to its first ever bowl win in the PapaJohns.com Bowl against the East Carolina Pirates in Birmingham, Alabama on December 23, 2006.

Even before Leavitt led the Bulls to a bowl game, there was a rumor that he was heavily courted by the University of Alabama, where officials thought so highly of him that they sent him an offer and a contract to sign. He was also pursued by Kansas State after his mentor there, Bill Snyder, stepped down. On both occasions, Leavitt chose to stay with the program he had created. The success of South Florida's 2006 season spawned yet another round of interest in Leavitt's services, as his name was mentioned in national publications as a candidate to replace Larry Coker at the University of Miami and Mike Shula again at Alabama. Again, Leavitt expressed his desire and intent to stay with the program he established at South Florida and removed himself from consideration for those positions.

On September 16, 2007, Leavitt's Bulls team cracked the top 25 in both major polls, entering the AP Poll at #23 and the Coaches' Poll at #24, for the first time in the program's 11-year history. On September 28, Leavitt's Bulls stunned the #5 West Virginia Mountaineers at Raymond James Stadium for, perhaps, the biggest win thus far for the South Florida football program. South Florida's ascension into the top 25 from entry into I-A/FBS is the fastest in NCAA history, surpassing Boise State's rise by a mere seven weeks. The Bulls achieved another record on September 30 when they became the fastest program of the modern era to reach the top 10, landing at #6 in the AP Poll and #9 in the Coaches' Poll.

On October 14, South Florida received its first ever BCS ranking as the #2 team in the nation behind only the Ohio State Buckeyes. That week the team was also ranked #2 in the AP Poll and #3 in both the Coaches' and the Harris Interactive Poll. That ranking lasted only one week as the Bulls lost to Rutgers, 30–27, on October 18 in Piscataway, New Jersey.

On March 11, 2008, Leavitt signed a two-year extension to his original seven-year, $7 million contract that he signed in 2006. The new contract paid Leavitt $12.6 million for the 2008–14 seasons, with an annual starting salary of $1.5 million increasing by $100,000 each contract year.

On January 8, 2010, Leavitt was fired after an investigation by USF officials found that he had struck a player in the locker room during halftime of a game against Louisville the previous November 21. Leavitt claimed he was merely trying to console the player and never struck him. School officials found that Leavitt was not truthful about what happened, and also found that he had interfered with the investigation. ESPN's Ivan Maisel reported that Leavitt's interference, which included telling several players and coaches to change their stories, was the biggest factor in the decision to fire him. The Tampa Tribune reported that school president Judy Genshaft and athletic director Doug Woolard felt they had no choice but to fire Leavitt after he refused to admit he had done anything wrong. Running backs coach Carl Franks was named interim coach of the Bulls until January 14, 2010, when Skip Holtz was hired as head coach.

In January 2011, a settlement of $2.75 million was reached between USF and Jim Leavitt. The settlement includes $2 million for "salary and benefits" as well as a payment of $750,000 "acknowledging Coach Leavitt's contributions to building USF's nationally respected football program."

=== San Francisco 49ers ===
Leavitt was hired to his first National Football League (NFL) job by Jim Harbaugh to be the San Francisco 49ers linebackers coach for the 2011 season. Leavitt and other staffers were let go by the 49ers in January 2015 following Harbaugh's departure for the University of Michigan head coaching job.

=== Return to college ranks ===
Leavitt was hired as defensive coordinator for the Colorado Buffaloes on February 5, 2015.

Leavitt was hired as defensive coordinator for the Oregon Ducks on December 14, 2016. On February 13, 2019, he was fired.

After serving as defensive analyst for Florida State during the 2019 season, he was hired as defensive coordinator at Florida Atlantic University In both jobs he was hired by Willie Taggart, who had also hired him as coordinator at Oregon.

On January 27, 2021, SMU hired Leavitt as defensive coordinator.

== Head coaching record ==
Year	Team	Overall	Conference	Standing	Bowl/playoffs
South Florida Bulls (NCAA Division I-AA independent) (1997–2000)
1997	South Florida	5–6			
1998	South Florida	8–3			
1999	South Florida	7–4			
2000	South Florida	7–4			
South Florida Bulls (NCAA Division I-A independent) (2001–2002)
2001	South Florida	8–3			
2002	South Florida	9–2			
South Florida Bulls (Conference USA) (2003–2004)
2003	South Florida	7–4	5–3	T–3rd	
2004	South Florida	4–7	3–5	T–6th	
South Florida Bulls (Big East Conference) (2005–2009)
2005	South Florida	6–6	4–3	T–3rd	L Meineke Car Care
2006	South Florida	9–4	4–3	T–4th	W Papajohns.com
2007	South Florida	9–4	4–3	T–3rd	L Sun
2008	South Florida	8–5	2–5	6th	W St. Petersburg
2009	South Florida	8–5	3–4	T–4th	W International
South Florida:		95–57	25–26		
Total:		95–57			
^{#}Rankings from final Coaches Poll.; ^{°}Rankings from final AP Poll.
