= Maikon Bonani =

Brazilian gridiron football player (born 1989)

No. 3
- Position: Placekicker

Personal information
- Born: January 29, 1989 (age 37); Matão, São Paulo, Brazil
- Listed height: 5 ft 10 in (1.78 m)
- Listed weight: 176 lb (80 kg)

Career information
- High school: Lake Wales (Lake Wales, Florida, U.S.)
- College: South Florida
- NFL draft: 2013: undrafted

Career history
- Tennessee Titans (2013–2014)*
- * Offseason or practice squad member only

Awards and highlights
- First-team All-Big East (2012); Second-team All-Big East (2011)
- Stats at Pro Football Reference

Maikon Bonani (born January 29, 1989) is a former American football placekicker from Brazil. He played college football for the South Florida Bulls. An undrafted free agent following the 2013 NFL draft, Bonani spent two offseasons with the Tennessee Titans in 2013 and 2014 and never played in a regular season game.

== Personal life ==
Born in 1989 to Marcia and Sidney Bonani, Maikon grew up in his birth city of Matão, São Paulo. When he was 11 years old, he moved from Brazil to the U.S. and lived in Lake Wales, in Polk County, Florida. While working at Busch Gardens Tampa in 2009, Bonani plunged 10.6 meters (35 feet) off of the sky gondola ride Skyride. He sustained an injury to his 12th thoracic vertebra due to the fall.

== College career ==
During his days in Lake Wales High School, he played both in junior and senior category as one of the main kickers with his personal best longest shot at a distance of 55 yards. In 2007, a Florida-based journal, the Lakeland Ledger, named him the male athlete of the year. He also got recognized as the football player of the year, the same year. After high school, he opted to study at University of South Florida.

== Professional career ==
Bonani signed with the Tennessee Titans on May 10, 2013, as an undrafted free agent. He competed with veteran Rob Bironas during training camp. On August 26, 2013, he was waived by the Titans.

After the release of Bironas during the 2014 offseason, Bonani was re-signed by the Titans and competed with undrafted rookie Travis Coons to be the team's new kicker for the 2014 season. He was released for a second time on August 30, 2014.
