= Marlon Mack =

American football player (born 1996)

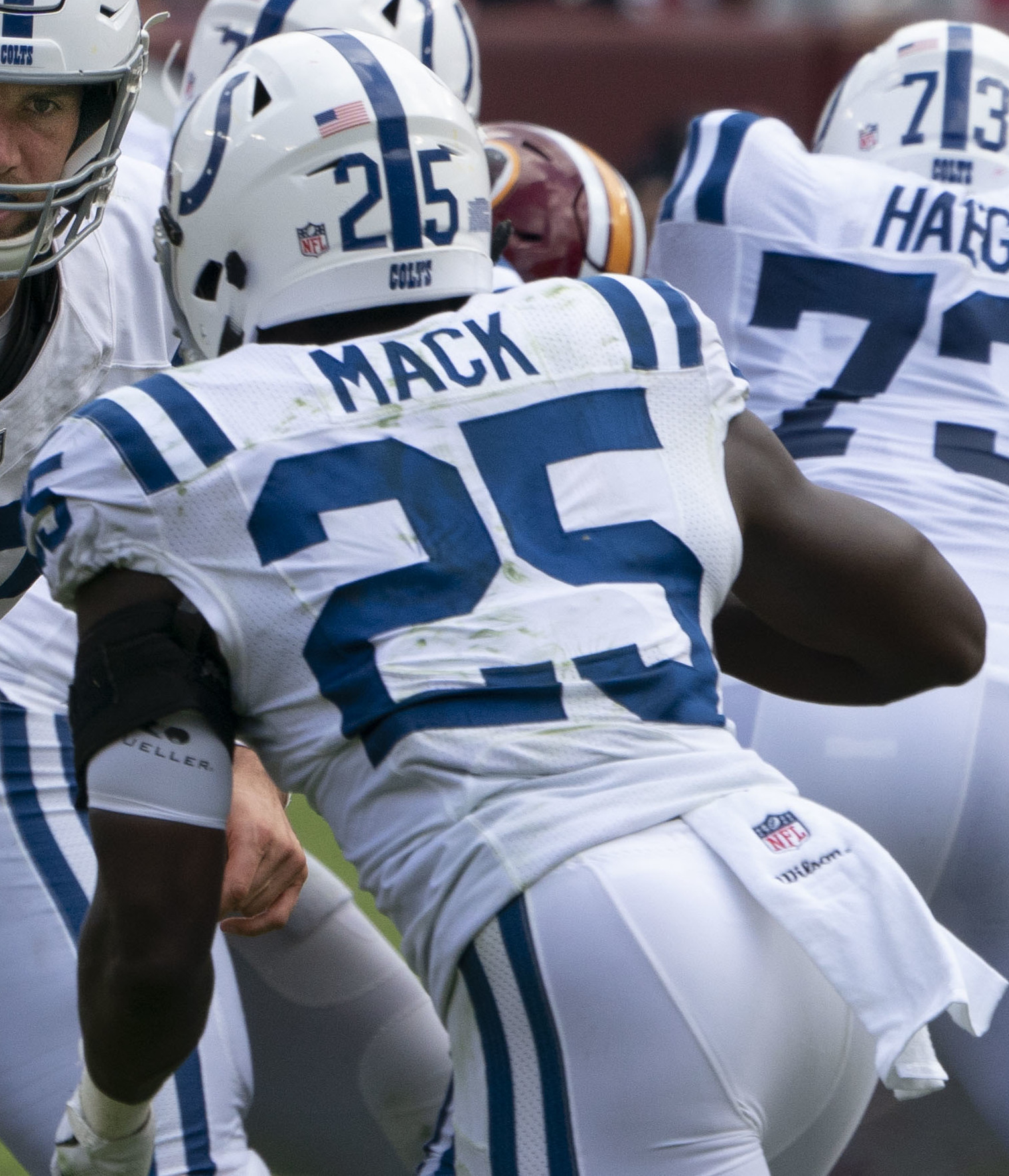
- Mack with the Indianapolis Colts in 2018

No. 25, 37
- Position: Running back

Personal information
- Born: March 7, 1996 (age 30); Sarasota, Florida, U.S.
- Listed height: 5 ft 11 in (1.80 m)
- Listed weight: 210 lb (95 kg)

Career information
- High school: Booker (South Florida)
- College: South Florida (2014–2016)
- NFL draft: 2017: 4th round, 143rd overall pick

Career history
- Indianapolis Colts (2017–2021); Houston Texans (2022)*; San Francisco 49ers (2022); Denver Broncos (2022); Arizona Cardinals (2023)
- * Offseason or practice squad member only

Awards and highlights
- AAC Rookie Player of the Year (2014); 3× First-team All-AAC (2014, 2015, 2016)

Career NFL statistics
- Rushing yards: 2,568
- Rushing average: 4.4
- Rushing touchdowns: 21
- Receptions: 65
- Receiving yards: 547
- Receiving touchdowns: 3
- Stats at Pro Football Reference

Marlon Devon Mack (born March 7, 1996) is an American former professional football player who was a running back in the National Football League (NFL). He played college football for the South Florida Bulls and was selected by the Indianapolis Colts in the fourth round of the 2017 NFL draft.

== Early life ==
Mack attended Booker High School in Sarasota, Florida. As a senior, he rushed for 1,527 yards and 19 touchdowns for the Tornadoes. He totaled 1,666 yards from scrimmage and scored 22 touchdowns on offense, and made 100 tackles and intercepted four passes on defense. He committed to the University of South Florida to play college football.

Mack was a four star recruit according to ESPN and 247Sports.com. The Scout.com and Rivals.com recruiting networks each gave him three stars. Mack received over a dozen scholarship offers from schools including Michigan, Louisville, Indiana, Iowa State, Florida Atlantic, Florida International, Marshall, and Ball State. Mack initially made a (soft) commit to UCLA but decommitted following a coaching change for the Bruins. Mack took an official visit to Louisville on January 17, 2014. Louisville believed Mack had committed to the Cardinals, but he chose USF on signing day.

== College career ==
Mack attended the University of South Florida, where he played college football for the Bulls from 2014 to 2016. In his first game at South Florida his freshman year in 2014, he tied the school record with 275 rushing yards. He finished the season with 1,041 rushing yards, a USF freshman record, on 202 carries with nine touchdowns over 12 starts. As a sophomore in 2015, he again started all 12 games and rushed for 1,381 yards on 210 carries and nine touchdowns. During his junior season, Mack became South Florida's all-time leading rushing, passing Andre Hall's 2,731. For the season, he rushed for 1,187 yards on 174 carries and had 15 touchdowns. After the season, he entered the 2017 NFL draft. He finished his career with 3,609 yards on 586 carries and 32 touchdowns.

== Professional career ==
Pre-draft measurables
Height	Weight	Arm length	Hand span	40-yard dash	10-yard split	20-yard split	Vertical jump	Broad jump	Bench press
5 ft 11 3/8 in (1.81 m)	213 lb (97 kg)	32 in (0.81 m)	9 in (0.23 m)	4.50 s	1.52 s	2.61 s	35.5 in (0.90 m)	10 ft 5 in (3.18 m)	15 reps
All values from NFL Combine

=== Indianapolis Colts ===
External videos
- Colts draft Marlon Mack 143rd overall

==== 2017 season ====
The Indianapolis Colts selected Mack in the fourth round (143rd overall) of the 2017 NFL draft. Mack became the first running back to be drafted from the University of South Florida and was the 15th running back drafted in 2017. He was the 28th USF player to be selected in the history of the NFL draft. On May 17, 2017, the Colts signed Mack to a four-year, $2.81 million contract that includes a signing bonus of $419,648.

Throughout training camp, Mack competed to be the primary backup running back against Robert Turbin and Josh Ferguson. Head coach Chuck Pagano named Mack the third running back on the Colts’ depth chart to begin the regular season, behind Frank Gore and Turbin.

Mack about to catch a pass from Jacoby Brissett in December 2017

Mack made his NFL debut in the season-opener at the Los Angeles Rams and had ten carries for 24 yards. He scored his first NFL touchdown on a three-yard carry during the fourth quarter of their 46–9 loss. In addition, he made his first career reception on a 21-yard pass from quarterback Scott Tolzien and fumbled once. Mack was inactive for two games (Weeks 3–4) due to a shoulder injury. In Week 5, Mack had nine carries for a season-high 91 rushing yards and a touchdown during a 26–23 overtime victory against the San Francisco 49ers. Three weeks later, Mack had a season-high 11 carries for 27 yards and caught three passes for 36 yards and made his first touchdown reception on a 24-yard pass from quarterback Jacoby Brissett during the third quarter as the Colts narrowly lost 24–23 at the Cincinnati Bengals in Week 8.

Mack finished his rookie year with 93 carries for 358 rushing yards and three rushing touchdowns to go along with 21 receptions for 225 receiving yards and one receiving touchdown in 14 games.

==== 2018 season ====
Mack entered training camp slated as the starting running back after Frank Gore departed in free agency. Mack was named the starting running back to begin the regular season. Mack was inactive for the season-opening 34–23 loss against the Bengals after suffering a hamstring injury in the first preseason game. Mack was sidelined for three consecutive games (Weeks 3–5) after aggravating his hamstring injury.

In Week 7, Mack had 19 carries for 126 rushing yards and two touchdowns during a 37–5 victory against the Buffalo Bills. On October 28, 2018, Mack ran the ball 25 times for 132 yards and two touchdowns in the Colts 42–28 win at the Oakland Raiders in a Week 8. He became the first Colts running back since Joseph Addai in 2007 to post back-to-back 100-yard rushing games. During Week 15, Mack had a season-high 27 carries for 139 rushing yards and two touchdowns during a 23–0 win over the Dallas Cowboys. He was just the second player all season to rush for over 100 yards against the Cowboys, and the first since 2015 to run for 100 yards and two scores. He also became just the third player in Colts franchise history to have multiple games with at least 125 yards rushing and two touchdowns in the same season, joining Eric Dickerson (1987) and Edgerrin James (1999 and 2005).

Mack finished his second season with 908 rushing yards and nine rushing touchdowns. He added 17 receptions for 103 yards and a touchdown. The Colts made the playoffs as the No. 6 seed. In the Wild Card Round against the Houston Texans, Mack set a franchise postseason record with 148 yards and a touchdown on 24 carries in a 21–7 victory. In the Divisional Round against the Kansas City Chiefs, he had nine carries for 46 yards in the 31–13 loss.

==== 2019 season ====
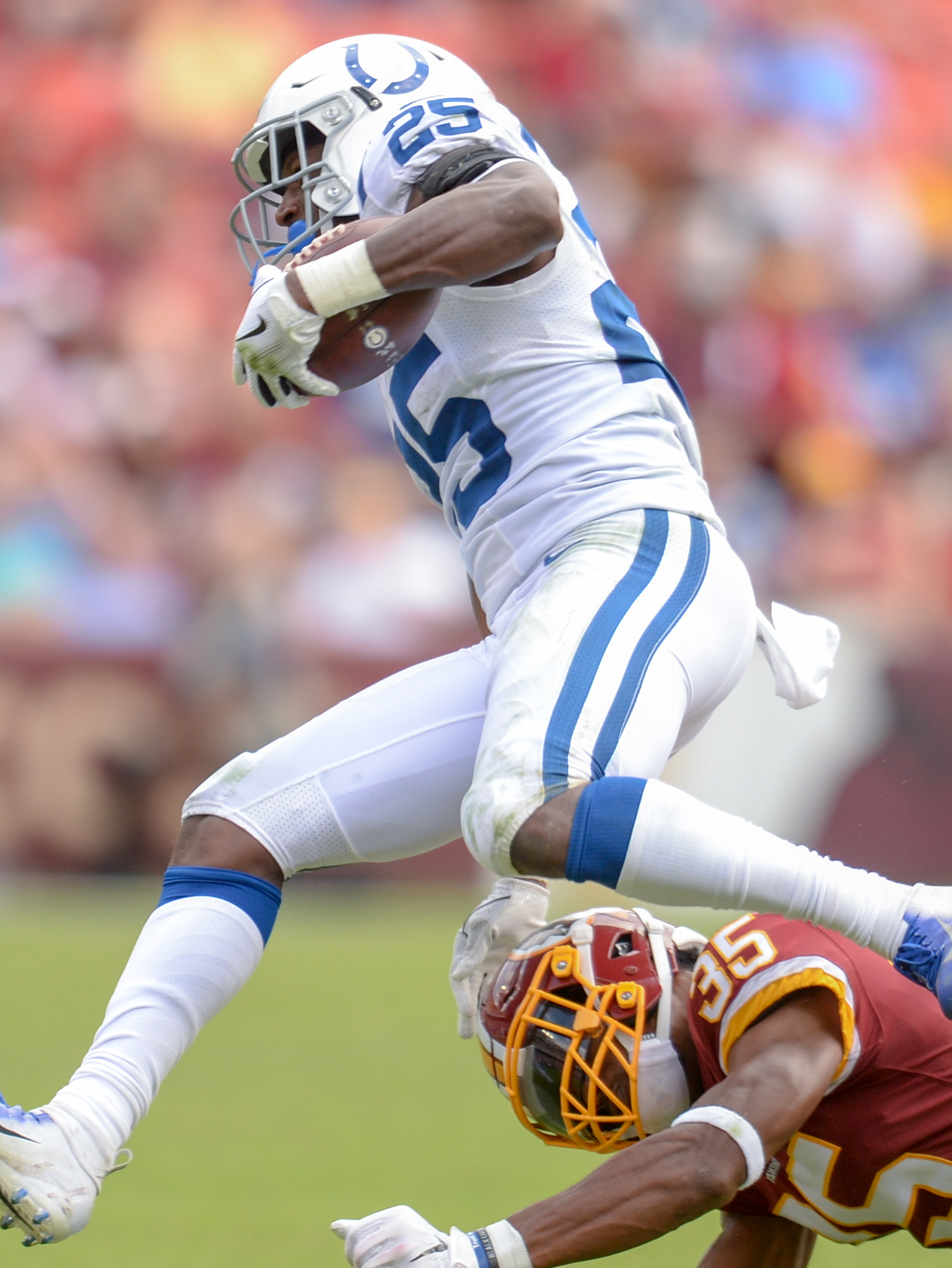
Mack in 2018

During the season-opener against the Los Angeles Chargers, Mack rushed 25 times for 174 yards which included a career-high 63-yard touchdown run in the 24–30 overtime loss. In Week 3 against the Atlanta Falcons, Mack rushed 16 times for 74 yards and a touchdown as the Colts won 27–24. In week 5 against the Kansas City Chiefs, Mack rushed 29 times for 132 yards and caught three passes for 16 yards in the 19–13 win. During Week 11 against the Jacksonville Jaguars, Mack finished with 109 rushing yards and a touchdown before fracturing his hand in the 33–13 win. In the 2019 season, Mack finished with 1,091 rushing yards and eight rushing touchdowns.

==== 2020 season ====
During Week 1 against the Jaguars, Mack left the game with an injury. An MRI revealed that Mack had suffered a torn Achilles and was ruled out for the rest of the season. He was placed on injured reserve on September 16.

==== 2021 season ====
Mack re-signed with the Colts on March 23, 2021. In six games, he finished with 28 carries for 101 rushing yards.

=== Houston Texans ===
On April 11, 2022, Mack signed with the Texans. He was released on August 30, 2022, and signed to the practice squad the next day. He was released on September 5.

=== San Francisco 49ers ===
On September 14, 2022, the 49ers signed Mack to their practice squad. He was promoted to the active roster on September 21. He was released on October 11. He signed back to the practice squad the following day.

=== Denver Broncos ===
On October 24, 2022, the Denver Broncos signed Mack off the 49ers' practice squad. He went on to play six games, recording 84 rushing yards and a rushing touchdown, along with eight catches for 99 receiving yards and a receiving touchdown. After suffering a hamstring injury in Week 17 against the Kansas City Chiefs, Mack was placed on season–ending injured reserve.

=== Arizona Cardinals ===
On August 4, 2023, Mack signed with the Arizona Cardinals. On August 9, 2023, head coach Jonathan Gannon announced that Mack would miss the 2023 season due to another torn Achilles.

== Career statistics ==
=== NFL ===
==== Regular season ====
Year	Team	Games		Rushing					Receiving					Fumbles	
Year	Team	GP	GS	Att	Yds	Avg	Lng	TD	Rec	Yds	Avg	Lng	TD	Fum	Lost
2017	IND	14	0	93	358	3.8	35	3	21	225	10.7	34	1	1	0
2018	IND	12	10	195	908	4.7	49	9	17	103	6.1	29T	1	1	1
2019	IND	14	12	247	1,091	4.4	63	8	14	82	5.9	14	0	0	0
2020	IND	1	1	4	26	6.5	18	0	3	30	10.0	19	0	0	0
2021	IND	6	0	28	101	3.6	22	0	2	8	4.0	7	0	0	0
2022	SF	2	0	0	0	0.0	0	0	0	0	0.0	0	0	0	0
2022	DEN	6	0	16	84	5.3	17	1	8	99	12.4	66	1	0	0
Career		55	23	583	2,568	4.4	63	21	65	547	8.4	66	3	2	1

==== Postseason ====
Year	Team	Games		Rushing					Receiving					Fumbles	
Year	Team	GP	GS	Att	Yds	Avg	Lng	TD	Rec	Yds	Avg	Lng	TD	Fum	Lost
2018	IND	2	2	33	194	5.9	29	1	2	6	3.0	6	0	0	0
2020	IND	0	0	Did not play due to injury											
Career		2	2	33	194	5.9	29	1	2	6	3.0	6	0	0	0

=== College ===
Season	Team	Class	GP	Rushing				Receiving			
Season	Team	Class	GP	Att	Yds	Avg	TD	Rec	Yds	Avg	TD
2014	South Florida	FR	12	202	1,041	5.2	9	21	160	7.6	0
2015	South Florida	SO	12	210	1,381	6.6	8	16	111	6.9	1
2016	South Florida	JR	12	174	1,187	6.8	15	28	227	8.1	0
Career			36	586	3,609	6.2	32	65	498	7.7	1
