= Taurus Johnson =

American football player (born 1986)

No. 89
- Position: Wide receiver

Personal information
- Born: April 13, 1986 (age 40); Fort Myers, Florida, U.S.
- Listed height: 6 ft 1 in (1.85 m)
- Listed weight: 218 lb (99 kg)

Career information
- High school: Cape Coral (FL)
- College: South Florida
- NFL draft: 2009: undrafted

Career history
- Kansas City Chiefs (2009)*; Detroit Lions (2009)*; Miami Dolphins (2009–2010)*; Cleveland Browns (2010)*; Hartford Colonials (2010); Washington Redskins (2010–2011)*; San Jose SaberCats (2012); Chicago Rush (2013)
- * Offseason or practice squad member only

Career AFL statistics
- Receptions: 26
- Receiving yards: 318
- Receiving TDs: 5
- Stats at ArenaFan.com

Taurus Robert Johnson (born April 13, 1986) is an American former professional football wide receiver. He was signed by the Kansas City Chiefs as an undrafted free agent in 2009. He played college football at South Florida.

Johnson was also a member of the Detroit Lions, Miami Dolphins, Hartford Colonials, Washington Redskins, San Jose SaberCats, and Chicago Rush.

== Early life ==
Johnson attended Cape Coral High School, in Cape Coral, Florida. He was rated a three-star recruit by Rivals and was ranked the 35th best wide out in the country and 45th overall in the state of Florida. He originally gave a verbal commitment to the University of Florida but after the firing of Head Coach Ron Zook, Johnson backed out on his verbal and decided on the University of South Florida.

== College career ==
Johnson played college football at the University of South Florida and finished second in South Florida history in kickoff returns (29) and third in kickoff return yards (784 yards).

== Professional career ==
=== Kansas City Chiefs ===
He was signed by the Chiefs as an undrafted free agent in 2009 and was on the team throughout the offseason before he was released in the final cuts.

=== Detroit Lions ===
Johnson was signed to the practice squad of the Detroit Lions on September 29, 2009. About a month later, on November 3, the Detroit Lions released Johnson from their practice squad.

=== Miami Dolphins ===
Johnson was signed to the Miami Dolphins' practice squad on December 1, 2009. After his contract expired following the season, Johnson was re-signed to a future contract on January 5, 2010. He was waived on August 12.

=== Hartford Colonials ===
In 2010, Johnson played for the Hartford Colonials of the United Football League.

=== Washington Redskins ===
Johnson was signed by the Washington Redskins to their practice squad in 2010. He was waived on July 30, 2011.
