= B. J. Daniels (American football) =

American gridiron football player (born 1989)

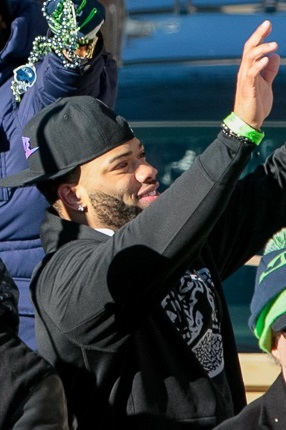
- Daniels with the Seattle Seahawks in 2014

No. 11, 2
- Positions: Quarterback, Wide receiver

Personal information
- Born: October 24, 1989 (age 37); Tallahassee, Florida, U.S.
- Listed height: 6 ft 0 in (1.83 m)
- Listed weight: 224 lb (102 kg)

Career information
- High school: Lincoln (Tallahassee)
- College: South Florida (2008–2012)
- NFL draft: 2013: 7th round, 237th overall pick

Career history

Playing
- San Francisco 49ers (2013); Seattle Seahawks (2013–2015); Houston Texans (2015); New York Giants (2016)*; Chicago Bears (2016)*; Atlanta Falcons (2016–2017)*; Saskatchewan Roughriders (2018)*; Salt Lake Stallions (2019); Seattle Dragons (2020)
- * Offseason or practice squad member only

Coaching
- Leon HS (FL) (2018) Quarterbacks coach; Lincoln HS (FL) (2020) Head coach; South Florida (2021) Offensive analyst

Awards and highlights
- Super Bowl champion (XLVIII)

Career NFL statistics
- Comp. / Att.: 1 / 2
- Passing yards: 7
- TD–INT: 0–0
- Receptions: 2
- Receiving yards: 18
- Stats at Pro Football Reference

Head coaching record
- Career: 6–2 (.750) (high school)

Bruce E. Daniels Jr. (born October 24, 1989) is an American former professional football player who was a quarterback and wide receiver in the National Football League (NFL). He was selected by the San Francisco 49ers in the seventh round of the 2013 NFL draft after playing college football for the South Florida Bulls. He played quarterback for South Florida as a four-year starter. He won Super Bowl XLVIII with the Seattle Seahawks over the Denver Broncos.

== Early life ==
Born and raised in Tallahassee, Florida, Daniels graduated from Lincoln High School in Tallahassee, where he once threw 6 touchdowns and 723 yards in a game vs Demply Prep.

== College career ==
Daniels finished the 2009 season with 1983 yards passing, 772 yards rushing, and 23 total touchdowns. Daniels responded in his junior year with 3,205 total yards. Daniels was on his way to becoming the all time yardage leader in Big East history when his senior season was cut short due to injury. Daniels ended his college career with 8,433 yards passing for 52 TD's, and 2,068 yards rushing for another 25 scores. Daniels achieved 10,501 total yards and 77 total touchdowns at USF, and finished his career second on the all time Big East yardage leaders. Daniels finished his college career high on all of USF's rushing and passing leaderboards. Daniels is also a member of Kappa Alpha Psi fraternity.

== Professional career ==
Pre-draft measurables
| Height | Weight | 40-yard dash | 10-yard split | 20-yard split | 20-yard shuttle | Three-cone drill | Vertical jump | Broad jump | Bench press |
|---|---|---|---|---|---|---|---|---|---|
| 6 ft 00 in (1.83 m) | 222 lb (101 kg) | 4.53 s | 1.57 s | 2.70 s | 4.27 s | 7.02 s | 32 1/2 in (0.83 m) | 10.5 ft 6 in (3.35 m) | 22 reps |
All values from South Florida Pro Day

=== San Francisco 49ers ===
Daniels was selected by the San Francisco 49ers in the seventh round with the 237th overall pick in the 2013 NFL draft. He was waived on October 1, 2013.

=== Seattle Seahawks ===
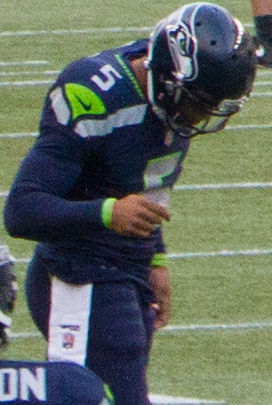
Daniels with the Seahawks in 2014

Daniels was claimed off waivers on October 2, 2013, by the Seattle Seahawks. Daniels was waived by the Seahawks on November 16, 2013. Daniels cleared waivers and the Seahawks signed him to the practice squad on November 18, 2013. On February 2, 2014, the Seahawks won Super Bowl XLVIII over the Denver Broncos.

Daniels re-signed with Seattle on February 6, 2014. He was waived on August 30, and re-signed to the practice squad on September 1, 2014.

On June 2, 2015, Seahawks offensive coordinator Darrell Bevell announced that Daniels would be making the switch to wide receiver for the 2015 season. Daniels was waived by the Seahawks on October 13, 2015. The team re-signed him two days later. On October 27, 2015, the Seahawks waived Daniels, but he re-signed with the team's practice squad soon after. On November 24, 2015, he was promoted to the active roster. On December 15, 2015, Daniels was waived. He played in six games overall for Seattle during the 2015 season, catching two passes for 18 yards on two targets while also returning one punt for seven yards and posting one solo tackle.

=== Houston Texans ===
On December 21, 2015, Daniels was signed off the Seahawks' practice squad by the Houston Texans. On December 27, 2015, Daniels made his Texans debut against the Tennessee Titans, completing one of two passes for seven yards and rushing six times for six yards. He also played in the regular season finale on January 3, 2016, returning four punts for 18 yards.

=== New York Giants ===
On May 9, 2016, Daniels signed a contract with the New York Giants. On June 17, 2016, he was released by the Giants.

=== Chicago Bears ===
On July 27, 2016, Daniels signed a contract with the Chicago Bears. On September 3, 2016, he was released by the Bears as part of final roster cuts.

=== Atlanta Falcons ===
On December 19, 2016, Daniels was signed to the Atlanta Falcons' practice squad. He signed a reserve/future contract with the Falcons on February 7, 2017. In June 2017, it was reported that Daniels had converted to running back. He was released by the team on August 15, 2017. In October 2017, Daniels was suspended for four weeks by the NFL.

=== Saskatchewan Roughriders ===
On May 17, 2018, Daniels signed with the Saskatchewan Roughriders of the Canadian Football League. Prior to signing with the Roughriders, he had played in Your Call Football. He was cut by Saskatchewan on June 9, 2018.

=== Salt Lake Stallions ===
In 2018, Daniels was assigned to the Orlando Apollos of the Alliance of American Football (AAF) for the 2019 season. On November 27, he was selected by the Salt Lake Stallions in the second round of the 2019 AAF QB Draft. He did not make the team's final 52-man roster, but was instead placed on injured reserve. The league ceased operations in April 2019.

=== Seattle Dragons ===
In 2019, Daniels was a member of the 2020 XFL draft class, and was selected by the Seattle Dragons during the open phase. He made his XFL debut in place of an injured Brandon Silvers and threw one incomplete pass. On February 29, 2020, Daniels came in for relief after Silvers was unable to be successful in the first half and helped his team score their first touchdown of the game, on a run by Kenneth Farrow, and then scored his first points as an XFL player, on a 1-Pt conversion. He had his contract terminated when the league suspended operations on April 10, 2020.

== Career statistics ==
=== NFL ===
| Year | Team | GP | GS | Passing | | | | | | | | Rushing | | | | Receiving | | | | | Punt returns | | | | |
| Year | Team | GP | GS | Cmp | Att | Pct | Yds | Y/A | TD | Int | Rtg | Att | Yds | Avg | TD | Rec | Yds | Avg | Lng | TD | Ret | Yds | Avg | Lng | TD |
|---|---|---|---|---|---|---|---|---|---|---|---|---|---|---|---|---|---|---|---|---|---|---|---|---|---|
| 2013 | SF | 0 | 0 | DNP | | | | | | | | | | | | | | | | | | | | | |
| 2013 | SEA | 0 | 0 | DNP | | | | | | | | | | | | | | | | | | | | | |
| 2015 | SEA | 6 | 0 | 0 | 0 | 0.0 | 0 | 0.0 | 0 | 0 | 0.0 | 0 | 0 | 0.0 | 0 | 2 | 18 | 9.0 | 12 | 0 | 1 | 7 | 7.0 | 7 | 0 |
| 2015 | HOU | 2 | 0 | 1 | 2 | 50.0 | 7 | 3.5 | 0 | 0 | 58.3 | 6 | 6 | 1.0 | 0 | 0 | 0 | 0.0 | 0 | 0 | 4 | 18 | 4.5 | 11 | 0 |
| Career | | 8 | 0 | 1 | 2 | 50.0 | 7 | 3.5 | 0 | 0 | 58.3 | 6 | 6 | 1.0 | 0 | 2 | 18 | 9.0 | 12 | 0 | 5 | 25 | 5.0 | 11 | 0 |

=== College ===
| Year | Team | Passing | | | | | | | | Rushing | | | |
| Year | Team | Cmp | Att | Pct | Yds | Y/A | TD | Int | Rtg | Att | Yds | Avg | TD |
|---|---|---|---|---|---|---|---|---|---|---|---|---|---|
| 2008 | South Florida | 4 | 5 | 80.0 | 86 | 17.2 | 0 | 0 | 224.5 | 3 | 2 | 0.7 | 0 |
| 2009 | South Florida | 122 | 227 | 53.7 | 1,983 | 8.7 | 14 | 9 | 139.5 | 175 | 772 | 4.4 | 9 |
| 2010 | South Florida | 143 | 245 | 58.4 | 1,685 | 6.9 | 11 | 13 | 120.3 | 112 | 259 | 2.3 | 5 |
| 2011 | South Florida | 215 | 365 | 58.9 | 2,604 | 7.1 | 13 | 7 | 126.7 | 132 | 601 | 4.6 | 6 |
| 2012 | South Florida | 165 | 290 | 56.9 | 2,075 | 7.2 | 14 | 10 | 126.0 | 104 | 434 | 4.2 | 5 |
| Career | | 649 | 1,132 | 57.3 | 8,433 | 7.4 | 52 | 39 | 128.2 | 526 | 2,068 | 3.9 | 25 |

== Coaching career ==
Daniels was hired as the quarterbacks coach at Leon High School in 2018. He was named the head coach at his alma mater Lincoln High School in Tallahassee in 2020.

Daniels was hired as an offensive analyst at his alma mater South Florida in 2021. In 2022, he became the assistant director of Donor Community and Alumni Engagement at the University of South Florida.
