= Sean Atkins =

American football player (born 2001)

No. 38
- Position: Wide receiver

Personal information
- Born: August 9, 2001 (age 25); Melbourne, Florida
- Listed height: 5 ft 10 in (1.78 m)
- Listed weight: 186 lb (84 kg)

Career information
- High school: Viera High School (Viera, Florida)
- College: South Florida (2020–2024)

Awards and highlights
- All-AAC Second Team (2023); All-AAC Third Team (2024)
- Stats at ESPN

Sean Atkins is an American former college football wide receiver who played for the South Florida Bulls from 2019 to 2024. A former walk-on, he became the first 1,000-yard receiver in USF program history in 2023, finishing his career as the Bulls' all-time leader in receptions (200) and receiving yards (2,167).

== Early life ==
Sean Atkins grew up in Melbourne, Florida, and attended Viera High School. A 5-foot-10, 165-pound wide receiver, he received limited recruiting attention and was not ranked by major recruiting services like Rivals.com or 247Sports. Despite an offer from an NCAA Division II program, Atkins chose to pursue NCAA Division I FBS football, joining the University of South Florida (USF) as a walk-on in 2019.

== College career ==
Atkins joined the South Florida Bulls football team in 2019 as a walk-on, balancing a part-time job as a food runner to pay rent while attending early morning practices and classes.

He saw limited action in his first two seasons, appearing in six games in 2020 with no recorded receptions.

In 2021, after earning a full scholarship before the season, Atkins recorded five receptions for 67 yards in 12 games.

In 2022, under new head coach Alex Golesh, Atkins emerged as a key receiver, catching 19 passes for 238 yards and three touchdowns. Golesh, impressed by Atkins’ high school film from Viera, praised his "nifty" route-running and reliability.

In 2023, Atkins recorded 92 receptions for 1,054 yards and seven touchdowns, becoming the first USF player to surpass 1,000 receiving yards in a season. Notable games included a career-high 116 yards and two touchdowns, including an 88-yard score, in a 44–30 win over Navy. He earned Second Team All-AAC honors and was named a semifinalist for the Burlsworth Trophy.

In 2024, Atkins earned third-team All-AAC honors from both coaches and Phil Steele, and was named to the Biletnikoff Award watch list.

He played in the 2023 Boca Raton Bowl and 2024 Hawai'i Bowl, setting a USF record with 17 bowl-game receptions.

Atkins finished his career with 200 receptions, 2,167 receiving yards, and 17 touchdowns, holding USF records for career receptions and receiving yards. Reflecting on roster limit changes potentially reducing walk-on opportunities, Atkins expressed concern for future players, stating, "It kind of eliminates all the stories like mine."

=== Career statistics ===
NCAAF career statistics
| Season | Team | GP | Rec | Yds | Avg | TD |
|---|---|---|---|---|---|---|
| 2019 | USF | 0 | 0 | 0 | 0.0 | 0 |
| 2020 | USF | 6 | 0 | 0 | 0.0 | 0 |
| 2021 | USF | 12 | 5 | 67 | 13.4 | 0 |
| 2022 | USF | 12 | 19 | 238 | 12.5 | 3 |
| 2023 | USF | 13 | 92 | 1,054 | 11.5 | 7 |
| 2024 | USF | 12 | 84 | 808 | 9.6 | 7 |
| Career | | 55 | 200 | 2,167 | 10.8 | 17 |

== Professional prospects ==
On March 26, 2025, Atkins participated in USF's Pro Day, performing drills before scouts from all 32 NFL teams and one Canadian Football League team. He completed 12 bench press reps of 225 pounds and a 9-foot-10-inch broad jump, though his 40-yard dash time was not publicly reported. Atkins’ undersized frame (5’8", 177 pounds) was noted as a challenge for NFL prospects, with the average NFL receiver being taller. Coach Alex Golesh highlighted Atkins’ ability to get open on third downs, comparing him to successful NFL receivers with long careers. Atkins trained in Lake Nona, Florida, post-season, emphasizing his route precision and reliable hands.

== Personal life ==
Atkins is from Melbourne, Florida, and was supported by his parents and family friends at his 2025 Pro Day. He has expressed gratitude for his walk-on journey, crediting his "chip on the shoulder" mentality for his success. Atkins has advocated for preserving walk-on opportunities in college football, citing their role in stories like his.
