= Carlton Mitchell =

American gridiron football player (born 1988)

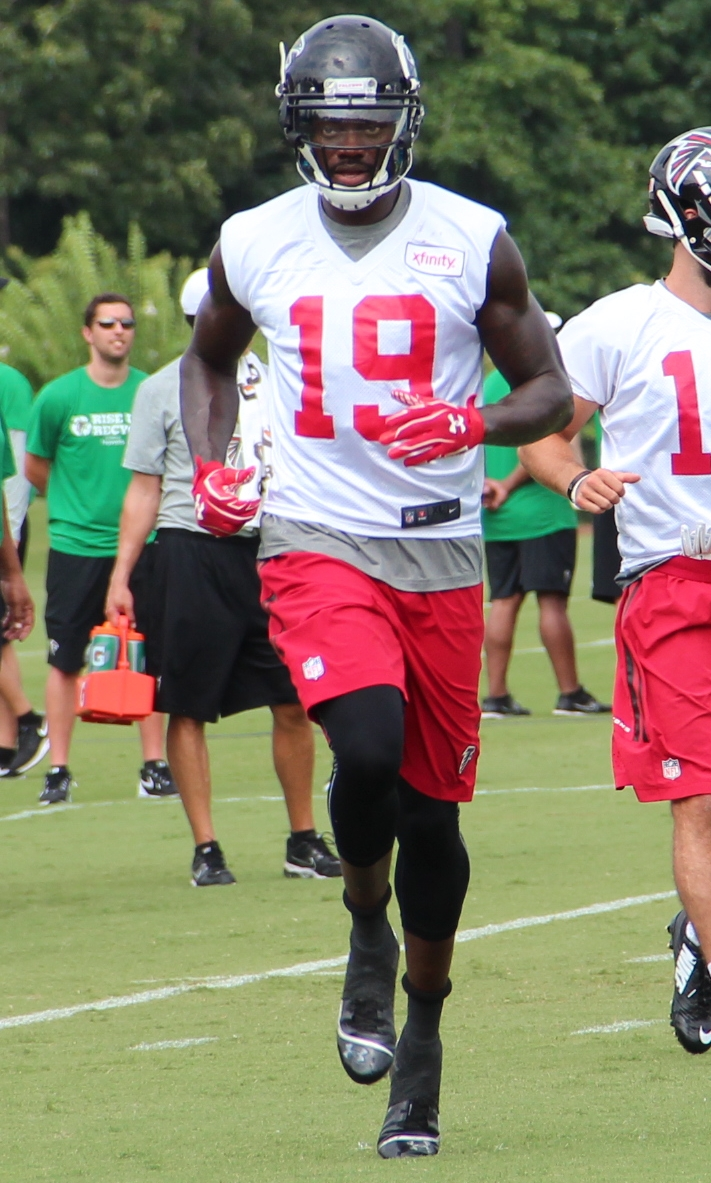
- Mitchell with the Atlanta Falcons in 2015

No. 18, 82, 88
- Position: Wide receiver

Personal information
- Born: April 6, 1988 (age 38); Gainesville, Florida, U.S.
- Listed height: 6 ft 4 in (1.93 m)
- Listed weight: 212 lb (96 kg)

Career information
- High school: Gaither (Tampa, Florida)
- College: South Florida
- NFL draft: 2010: 6th round, 177th overall pick

Career history
- Cleveland Browns (2010–2011); Jacksonville Jaguars (2012); Dallas Cowboys (2013)*; Tampa Bay Buccaneers (2013)*; Edmonton Eskimos (2013); Ottawa Redblacks (2014); Atlanta Falcons (2015)*
- * Offseason or practice squad member only

Career NFL statistics
- Receptions: 3
- Receiving yards: 31
- Stats at Pro Football Reference

Carlton Lorange Mitchell (born April 6, 1988) is an American former professional football player who was a wide receiver in the National Football League (NFL) and Canadian Football League (CFL). He was selected by the Cleveland Browns in the sixth round of the 2010 NFL draft. He played college football for the South Florida Bulls.

== College career ==
Mitchell played college football for the South Florida Bulls, where he was the school's career leader in receiving yards until his record was broken by Andre Davis in 2014. He announced on January 9, 2010 that he would forgo his senior season and enter the 2010 NFL draft. Mitchell is also a member of Phi Beta Sigma fraternity.

== Professional career ==
=== Cleveland Browns ===
Mitchell was selected by the Cleveland Browns in the sixth round of the 2010 NFL draft with the 177th overall pick.

In the 2010 NFL season he played in five games as a rookie. In 2011, he played in eleven games catching three passes.

On August 26, 2012, Mitchell was released by the Browns after being hampered by a leg injury in training camp.

=== Jacksonville Jaguars ===
Mitchell was signed by the Jacksonville Jaguars on November 21, 2012.

He was released on November 24, 2012.

=== Dallas Cowboys ===
Mitchell signed with the Dallas Cowboys on January 7, 2013. He was released on May 29, 2013.

=== Tampa Bay Buccaneers ===
On June 4, 2013, Mitchell signed with the Tampa Bay Buccaneers. On August 26, 2013, he was waived by the Buccaneers.

=== Edmonton Eskimos ===
On October 14, 2013, Mitchell signed with the Edmonton Eskimos. He played in two games both starts, for the Eskimos in 2013, catching six passes for 69 yards on 11 targets. He also posted 17 special teams tackles.

=== Ottawa Redblacks ===
In the 2013 CFL Expansion Draft, Mitchell was selected with the 6th pick in the first round. He dressed in eight games, starting seven, during the 2014 season, recording 16 receptions for 170 yards on 32 targets.

=== Atlanta Falcons ===
Mitchell was a member of the Atlanta Falcons in the 2015 pre-season, but did not survive the finals cuts as he was released on September 5, 2015.
