= Andre Hall (American football) =

American football player (born 1982)

No. 23
- Position: Running back

Personal information
- Born: August 20, 1982 (age 44); St. Petersburg, Florida, U.S.
- Listed height: 5 ft 10 in (1.78 m)
- Listed weight: 212 lb (96 kg)

Career information
- College: South Florida
- NFL draft: 2006: undrafted

Career history
- Tampa Bay Buccaneers (2006)*; Chicago Bears (2006)*; Denver Broncos (2006–2008); Houston Texans (2009)*; Omaha Nighthawks (2010)*; Sacramento Mountain Lions (2010)
- * Offseason or practice squad member only

Awards and highlights
- First-team All-Big East (2005)

Career NFL statistics
- Rushing attempts: 79
- Rushing yards: 360
- Rushing touchdowns: 2
- Receptions: 5
- Receiving yards: 94
- Return yards: 944
- Stats at Pro Football Reference

Andre Hall (born August 20, 1982) is an American former professional football player who was a running back in the National Football League (NFL). He was signed by the Tampa Bay Buccaneers as an undrafted free agent in 2006. He played college football for the South Florida Bulls, where he was the school's all-time leading rusher until 2016.

Hall was also a member of the Denver Broncos, Chicago Bears, Houston Texans, and Omaha Nighthawks of the UFL.

== Early life ==
Hall played high school football at Dixie M. Hollins High School in St. Petersburg, Florida. He led Pinellas County in rushing for 1,742 yards on 227 carries (7.7 avg.) and 26 touchdowns in 2000, his one and only season of high school football.

== Professional career ==
Pre-draft measurables
Height	Weight	Arm length	Hand span	40-yard dash	10-yard split	20-yard split	20-yard shuttle	Three-cone drill	Vertical jump	Broad jump	Bench press
5 ft 8 1/2 in (1.74 m)	208 lb (94 kg)	29 1/2 in (0.75 m)	9 7/8 in (0.25 m)	4.47 s	1.53 s	2.57 s	4.20 s	7.38 s	33.0 in (0.84 m)	9 ft 5 in (2.87 m)	18 reps
All values from NFL Combine/Pro Day

=== Omaha Nighthawks ===
Hall was signed by the Omaha Nighthawks of the United Football League on August 25, 2010.

== NFL career statistics ==
Year	Team	GP	GS	Att	Yds	Avg	Lng	TD	Rec	Yds	Avg	Lng	TD	Fum	Lost
2006	DEN	0	0	DNP											
2007	DEN	10	1	44	216	4.9	62T	2	2	69	34.5	65	0	1	0
2008	DEN	8	0	35	144	4.1	16	0	3	25	8.3	11	0	2	2
Career		18	1	79	360	4.6	62	2	5	94	18.8	65	0	3	2
