= Marquel Blackwell =

American football player and coach (born 1979)

Current position
- Title: Co-offensive coordinator/Quarterbacks
- Team: UConn
- Conference: Independent

Biographical details
- Born: July 29, 1979 (age 47); St. Petersburg, Florida, U.S.
- Education: University of South Florida

Playing career
- 1999–2002: South Florida
- 2003: New York Jets
- 2003: Tampa Bay Storm
- 2004: Tampa Bay Buccaneers
- 2005: Montreal Alouettes
- 2006: Alabama Steeldogs
- Position: Quarterback

Coaching career (HC unless noted)
- 2006: Tampa (FL) Freedom HS (OC)
- 2007–2008: Tampa (FL) Freedom HS
- 2009–2011: South Florida (QC)
- 2012: Western Kentucky (RB)
- 2014: St. Petersburg (FL) Lakewood HS (AHC/OC)
- 2015: Florida (QCS)
- 2016–2017: Toledo (RB)
- 2018: West Virginia (RB)
- 2019: Houston (co-OC/QB)
- 2020–2021: Houston (RB)
- 2022: Ole Miss (RB)
- 2023: Texas A&M (RB)
- 2024–2025: South Carolina (RB)
- 2026–present: UConn (co-OC/QB)

Administrative career (AD unless noted)
- 2013: South Florida (DPD)

Marquel Blackwell (born July 29, 1979) is a former American football quarterback and the former running backs coach for the University of South Carolina.

== High school and college career ==
After playing for Lakewood High School and Dixie Hollins High School in Pinellas County, Florida and leading Dixie to the 5A tate championship game his junior season, Blackwell was the quarterback at the University of South Florida for four seasons. Blackwell became a starter three games into his redshirt freshman season and led South Florida to a 30–12 mark during the Bulls' move from Division I-AA to I-A in 2001. During his college career from 1999 to 2002, he threw for 9,108 yards and 57 touchdowns, and had 1,235 rushing yards and 20 rushing touchdowns. He set most of the school's individual passing records during his time as quarterback; as of 2009, he is also the Bulls' No. 6 career rusher and No. 3 in rushing touchdowns.

== Professional career ==
=== New York Jets ===
Blackwell entered the 2003 NFL draft but was not drafted. He signed with the New York Jets as a rookie free agent but only saw playing time in 1 preseason game in the preseason finale against the Philadelphia Eagles. Blackwell threw for two touchdowns and 111 yards in the first half. He was the Jets' No. 2 QB in week one of the regular season (The Jets released backup Jamie Martin so the club did not have to pay his entire season salary if he was not on the roster Week 1), only to be cut again after week 1 when Martin returned.

=== Tampa Bay Storm ===
Blackwell had a brief stint, but did not even appear, in the Arena Football League (AFL) with the Tampa Bay Storm.

=== Tampa Bay Buccaneers ===
In 2004, Blackwell signed with the Tampa Bay Buccaneers.

=== Montreal Alouettes ===
In 2005, Blackwell signed with the Montreal Alouettes of the Canadian Football League (CFL).

=== Alabama Steeldogs ===
In 2006, Blackwell signed with the Alabama Steeldogs of the Arena Football 2 (af2), where former Dixie and USF teammate Glenn Davis served as assistant coach.

Blackwell was inducted into the USF Athletic Hall of Fame in 2013.

== Coaching career ==
=== Early coaching career ===
Following his playing career Blackwell spent two years as the head coach of Freedom High School's football team after one as the offensive coordinator. In 2009 became a program assistant at the University of South Florida where he spent three years. In 2012 he was the running backs coach for Western Kentucky.

=== Toledo ===
In 2016 and 2017 Blackwell worked as the running backs coach for Toledo.

=== West Virginia ===
On February 15, 2018, Blackwell was named the running backs coach at West Virginia University.

=== Houston ===
Blackwell joined Dana Holgorsen at the University of Houston on January 11, 2019 as the co-offensive coordinator and quarterbacks coach. Following the 2019 season, Blackwell was demoted to running backs coach after Houston was 78th in yards per game on offense in 2019. He remained as the running backs coach until after the 2021 season.

=== Ole Miss ===
On January 13, 2022 it was announced that Blackwell was to become the new running backs coach at Ole Miss replacing Kevin Smith.
