= 2012 South Florida Bulls football team =

American college football season

2012 South Florida Bulls football
- Conference: Big East Conference
- Record: 3–9 (1–6 Big East)
- Head coach: Skip Holtz (3rd season)
- Offensive coordinator: Todd Fitch (3rd season)
- Offensive scheme: Multiple
- Defensive coordinator: Chris Cosh (1st season)
- Base defense: 4–3
- Home stadium: Raymond James Stadium

2012 Big East Conference football standings
	Conf.			Overall
Team	W		L	W		L
No. 13 Louisville $+	5	–	2	11	–	2
Cincinnati +	5	–	2	10	–	3
Rutgers +	5	–	2	9	–	4
Syracuse +	5	–	2	8	–	5
Pittsburgh	3	–	4	6	–	7
Connecticut	2	–	5	5	–	7
Temple	2	–	5	4	–	7
South Florida	1	–	6	3	–	9
$ – BCS representative as conference champion; + – Conference co-champions; Rankings from AP Poll

The 2012 South Florida Bulls football team represented the University of South Florida (USF) in the 2012 NCAA Division I FBS football season. The Bulls played their home games at Raymond James Stadium in Tampa, Florida. The 2012 season was the 16th season overall for the Bulls and their 8th season as a member of the Big East Conference. This was Holtz's third and final year at USF; USF fired Holtz at the conclusion of the season. They finished the season 3–9, 1–6 in Big East play to finish in last place. This season saw the Bulls win their fewest games in program history (3).

== Schedule ==
Date	Time	Opponent	Site	TV	Result	Attendance
September 1	7:00 p.m.	Chattanooga*	Raymond James Stadium; Tampa, FL	ESPN3	W 34–13	41,285
September 8	3:30 p.m.	at Nevada*	Mackay Stadium; Reno, NV	CBSSN	W 32–31	22,804
September 13	7:30 p.m.	Rutgers	Raymond James Stadium; Tampa, FL	ESPN	L 13–23	44,219
September 22	4:30 p.m.	at Ball State*	Scheumann Stadium; Muncie, IN	ESPN3	L 27–31	16,397
September 29	6:00 p.m.	No. 4 Florida State*	Raymond James Stadium; Tampa, FL	ESPN	L 17–30	69,383
October 6	12:00 p.m.	at Temple	Lincoln Financial Field; Philadelphia, PA	Big East Network	L 28–37	25,796
October 20	3:30 p.m.	at No. 14 Louisville	Papa John's Cardinal Stadium; Louisville, KY	ABC	L 25–27	50,167
October 27	7:00 p.m.	Syracuse^{†}	Raymond James Stadium; Tampa, FL	ESPN3	L 36–37	38,562
November 3	7:00 p.m.	Connecticut	Raymond James Stadium; Tampa, FL	ESPNU	W 13–6	36,180
November 17	3:00 p.m.	at Miami (FL)*	Sun Life Stadium; Miami Gardens, FL	FSF	L 9–40	38,869
November 23	7:00 p.m.	at Cincinnati	Nippert Stadium; Cincinnati, OH	ESPN	L 10–27	21,171
December 1	7:00 p.m.	Pittsburgh	Raymond James Stadium; Tampa, FL	ESPN2	L 3–27	35,141
*Non-conference game; ^{†}Homecoming; Rankings from Coaches' Poll released prior to the game; All times are in Eastern time
