= 2013 South Florida Bulls football team =

American college football season

2013 South Florida Bulls football
- Conference: American Athletic Conference
- Record: 2–10 (2–6 AAC)
- Head coach: Willie Taggart (1st season)
- Offensive coordinator: Walt Wells (1st season)
- Offensive scheme: Gulf Coast
- Defensive coordinator: Chuck Bresnahan (1st season)
- Base defense: 4–3
- Home stadium: Raymond James Stadium

2013 American Athletic Conference football standings
	Conf.			Overall
Team	W		L	W		L
No. 10 UCF $	8	–	0	12	–	1
No. 15 Louisville	7	–	1	12	–	1
Cincinnati	6	–	2	9	–	4
Houston	5	–	3	8	–	5
SMU	4	–	4	5	–	7
Rutgers	3	–	5	6	–	7
UConn	3	–	5	3	–	9
South Florida	2	–	6	2	–	10
Memphis	1	–	7	3	–	9
Temple	1	–	7	2	–	10
$ – BCS representative as conference champion; Rankings from AP Poll

The 2013 South Florida Bulls football team represented the University of South Florida (USF) in the 2013 NCAA Division I FBS football season. The Bulls played their home games at Raymond James Stadium in Tampa, Florida. The 2013 college football season was the 17th season overall for the Bulls, and their first season as a member of the American Athletic Conference. They were led by first year head coach Willie Taggart after USF fired Skip Holtz at the conclusion of the 2012 season. This season followed a season that saw the Bulls win their fewest games in program history (3). They broke that record by only winning 2 games in 2013, finishing 2–10, 2–6 in American Athletic play to finish in eighth place.

== Schedule ==
Date	Time	Opponent	Site	TV	Result	Attendance
August 31	7:00 p.m.	McNeese State*	Raymond James Stadium; Tampa, FL	ESPN3	L 21–53	35,470
September 7	12:00 p.m.	at Michigan State*	Spartan Stadium; East Lansing, MI	ESPNU	L 6–21	70,401
September 14	7:00 p.m.	Florida Atlantic*	Raymond James Stadium; Tampa, FL (rivalry)	ESPN3	L 10–28	33,792
September 28	12:00 p.m.	No. 15 Miami (FL)*	Raymond James Stadium; Tampa, FL	ESPNU	L 21–49	47,562
October 5	7:00 p.m.	Cincinnati	Raymond James Stadium; Tampa, FL	ESPN3	W 26–20	31,077
October 12	12:00 p.m.	at UConn	Rentschler Field; East Hartford, CT	AAN	W 13–10	37,861
October 26	12:00 p.m.	No. 16 Louisville†	Raymond James Stadium; Tampa, FL	ESPN2	L 3–34	35,782
October 31	7:00 p.m.	at Houston	Reliant Stadium; Houston, TX	ESPN	L 23–35	22,707
November 16	7:00 p.m.	Memphis	Raymond James Stadium; Tampa, FL	ESPN3	L 10–23	30,831
November 23	7:00 p.m.	SMU	Raymond James Stadium; Tampa, FL	ESPN3	L 6–16	28,397
November 29	8:00 p.m.	at No. 19 UCF	Bright House Networks Stadium; Orlando, FL (War on I–4)	ESPN	L 20–23	45,952
December 7	7:30 p.m.	at Rutgers	High Point Solutions Stadium; Piscataway, NJ	ESPN2	L 6–31	37,645
*Non-conference game; Rankings from Coaches Poll released prior to the game; All times are in Eastern time
