= 2011 South Florida Bulls football team =

American college football season

2011 South Florida Bulls football
- Conference: Big East Conference
- Record: 5–7 (1–6 Big East)
- Head coach: Skip Holtz (2nd season)
- Offensive coordinator: Todd Fitch (2nd season)
- Offensive scheme: Multiple
- Defensive coordinator: Mark Snyder (2nd season)
- Base defense: 3–4
- Captains: B. J. Daniels; Chaz Hine; Jerrell Young; Quenton Washington
- Home stadium: Raymond James Stadium

2011 Big East Conference football standings
	Conf.			Overall
Team	W		L	W		L
No. 17 West Virginia $+	5	–	2	10	–	3
No. 25 Cincinnati +	5	–	2	10	–	3
Louisville +	5	–	2	7	–	6
Rutgers	4	–	3	9	–	4
Pittsburgh	4	–	3	6	–	7
Connecticut	3	–	4	5	–	7
South Florida	1	–	6	5	–	7
Syracuse	1	–	6	5	–	7
$ – BCS representative as conference champion; + – Conference co-champions; As of January 11, 2012; Rankings from AP Poll

The 2011 South Florida Bulls football team represented the University of South Florida (USF) in the 2011 NCAA Division I FBS football season. The Bulls played their home games at Raymond James Stadium in Tampa, Florida. The 2011 college football season was the 15th season overall for the Bulls, and their seventh season as a member of the Big East Conference. This was the second season with Skip Holtz as the head coach. They finished the season 5–7, 1–6 in Big East play to finish in a tie for seventh place. USF failed to qualify for a post-season bowl ending its streak of six consecutive bowl trips dating back to 2005.

== Schedule ==
Date	Time	Opponent	Rank	Site	TV	Result	Attendance
September 3	3:30 p.m.	at No. 16 Notre Dame*		Notre Dame Stadium; Notre Dame, IN	NBC	W 23–20	80,795
September 10	7:00 p.m.	Ball State*	No. 22	Raymond James Stadium; Tampa, FL	BHSN	W 37–7	45,113
September 17	7:00 p.m.	Florida A&M*	No. 20	Raymond James Stadium; Tampa, FL	BHSN	W 70–17	50,128
September 24	7:00 p.m.	UTEP*	No. 18	Raymond James Stadium; Tampa, FL	ESPN3	W 52–24	48,231
September 29	8:00 p.m.	at Pittsburgh	No. 16	Heinz Field; Pittsburgh, PA	ESPN	L 17–44	40,025
October 15	3:30 p.m.	at Connecticut		Rentschler Field; East Hartford, CT	BIG EAST Network	L 10–16	37,162
October 22	12:00 p.m.	Cincinnati^{†}		Raymond James Stadium; Tampa, FL	BIG EAST Network	L 34–37	39,456
November 5	7:00 p.m.	at Rutgers		High Point Solutions Stadium; Piscataway, NJ	ESPN3	L 17–20 ^{OT}	36,911
November 11	8:00 p.m.	at Syracuse		Carrier Dome; Syracuse, NY	ESPN2	W 37–17	41,582
November 19	3:30 p.m.	Miami (FL)*		Raymond James Stadium; Tampa, FL	ESPNU	L 3–6	47,745
November 25	11:00 a.m.	Louisville		Raymond James Stadium; Tampa, FL	ESPN2	L 24–34	46,666
December 1	8:00 p.m.	No. 20 West Virginia		Raymond James Stadium; Tampa, FL	ESPN	L 27–30	41,743
*Non-conference game; ^{†}Homecoming; Rankings from AP Poll released prior to the game; All times are in Eastern time

== Rankings ==
Ranking movements Legend: ██ Increase in ranking ██ Decrease in ranking — = Not ranked RV = Received votes
	Week															
Poll	Pre	1	2	3	4	5	6	7	8	9	10	11	12	13	14	Final
AP	—	22	20	18	16	RV	RV	—	—	—	—	—	—	—	—	—
Coaches	RV	RV	22	17	14	RV	RV	—	—	—	—	—	—	—	—	—
Harris	Not released						RV	—	—	—	—	—	—	—	—	Not released
BCS	Not released							—	—	—	—	—	—	—	—	Not released
