= Rodney Adams =

American football player (born 1994)

No. 13
- Position: Wide receiver

Personal information
- Born: September 15, 1994 (age 32); St. Petersburg, Florida, U.S.
- Listed height: 6 ft 1 in (1.85 m)
- Listed weight: 189 lb (86 kg)

Career information
- High school: Lakewood (St. Petersburg)
- College: South Florida
- NFL draft: 2017: 5th round, 170th overall pick

Career history
- Minnesota Vikings (2017); Indianapolis Colts (2018–2019); Chicago Bears (2020–2021); New York Jets (2022)

Awards and highlights
- Second-team All-AAC (2016)
- Stats at Pro Football Reference

Rodney Alan Adams Jr. (born September 15, 1994) is an American former professional football player who was a wide receiver in the National Football League (NFL). He played college football for the South Florida Bulls, and was selected the Minnesota Vikings in the fifth round of the 2017 NFL draft.

== College career ==
Adams played college football at the University of South Florida, after transferring from the University of Toledo. During his senior season, he set a school record with 67 receptions and tied his own single-season record with 822 receiving yards. He caught five touchdowns. During his collegiate career, Adams caught 16 touchdowns which is second in school history. Adams was also a kick return specialist with 1,140 yards on 46 returns, including a 97-yard kickoff return for a touchdown.

=== Statistics ===
Year	Team	Receiving				Rushing				Kick return			
Year	Team	Rec	Yards	Avg	TDs	Att	Yards	Avg	TDs	Ret	Yards	Avg	TDs
2013	Toledo	2	15	7.5	0	1	5	5.0	0	2	17	8.5	0
2014	South Florida	23	323	14.0	2	5	52	10.4	1	6	123	20.5	0
2015	South Florida	45	822	18.3	9	11	87	7.9	1	16	466	29.1	1
2016	South Florida	67	822	12.0	5	23	236	10.3	5	22	534	24.3	0
NCAA Career Totals		137	1,982	14.5	16	40	380	9.5	7	46	1,140	24.8	1

== Professional career ==
External videos
- Adams performing at the NFL Combine
- Adams gets drafted by Minnesota

Pre-draft measurables
Height	Weight	Arm length	Hand span	40-yard dash	20-yard shuttle	Three-cone drill	Vertical jump	Broad jump	Bench press
6 ft 1 1/4 in (1.86 m)	189 lb (86 kg)	32 in (0.81 m)	9 in (0.23 m)	4.44 s	4.28 s	6.98 s	29.5 in (0.75 m)	10 ft 5 in (3.18 m)	8 reps
All values are from NFL Combine

=== Minnesota Vikings ===
Adams was selected by the Minnesota Vikings in the fifth round, 170th overall, in the 2017 NFL draft. He was waived by the Vikings on October 30, 2017, and was re-signed to the practice squad.

=== Indianapolis Colts ===
On February 2, 2018, Adams signed a reserve/future contract with the Indianapolis Colts. He was placed on the reserve/retired list on April 9, 2018.

Adams was reinstated from the reserve/retired list to the active roster on January 29, 2020. He was waived on August 2, 2020.

=== Chicago Bears ===
Adams signed with the Chicago Bears on August 20, 2020. He was released as part of final roster cuts on September 5, and was added to the practice squad a day later. On January 11, 2021, Adams signed a reserve/futures contract with the Bears.

On August 31, the Bears announced Adams made the 53 man roster, marking the first time since 2017 Adams had been on an NFL roster. However, he was released the following day after roster restructuring and placed on the team's practice squad. Adams made his regular season debut for the Bears on December 5 against the Arizona Cardinals. As a member of the practice squad, he became a free agent following Week 17.

=== New York Jets ===
Adams was signed to a reserve/futures contract by the New York Jets on January 13, 2022. He was waived with a non-football injury designation on May 23, 2022.

== Personal life ==
Adams' mother, Michelle Conway Scott, died in a car accident in 2013. Since the accident, Adams has dedicated his career to his mother. Adams became the legal guardian of his brother, Antonio Blount, who was 16 at the time. He was granted a hardship and transferred from Toledo to South Florida to finish his college football career.
