= Kawika Mitchell =

American football player (born 1979)

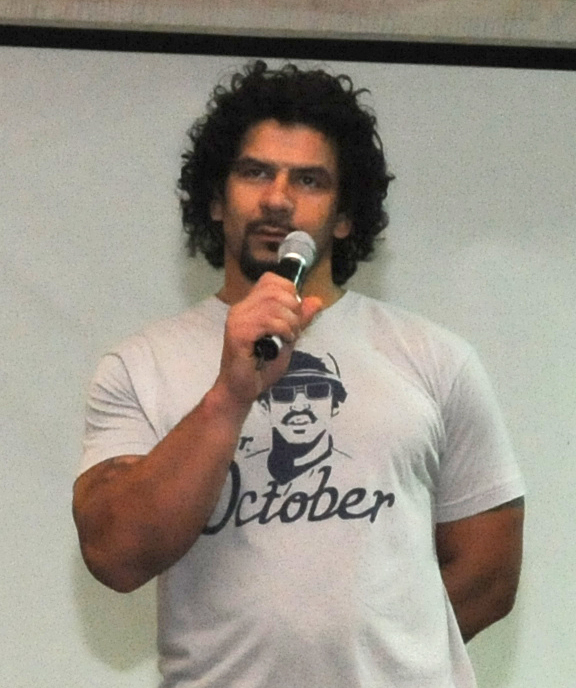
- Mitchell answering questions from the 380th Air Expeditionary Wing in 2012

No. 50, 55, 59, 94
- Position: Linebacker

Personal information
- Born: October 10, 1979 (age 47); Winter Springs, Florida, U.S.
- Listed height: 6 ft 1 in (1.85 m)
- Listed weight: 253 lb (115 kg)

Career information
- High school: Lake Howell (Winter Park, Florida)
- College: South Florida
- NFL draft: 2003: 2nd round, 47th overall pick

Career history
- Kansas City Chiefs (2003–2006); New York Giants (2007); Buffalo Bills (2008–2010); New Orleans Saints (2010)

Awards and highlights
- Super Bowl champion (XLII)

Career NFL statistics
- Total tackles: 492
- Sacks: 13
- Forced fumbles: 6
- Fumble recoveries: 6
- Interceptions: 6
- Defensive touchdowns: 3
- Stats at Pro Football Reference

Kawika Uilani Mitchell (born October 10, 1979) is an American former professional football player who was a linebacker in the National Football League (NFL). He played college football for the South Florida Bulls. Mitchell was selected by the Kansas City Chiefs in the second round in 2003. Mitchell also played for the New York Giants, Buffalo Bills and New Orleans Saints.

== College career ==
Kawika Mitchell started his college football career with the University of Georgia, but transferred to the South Florida Bulls after his freshman year. During his career he made 367 tackles, a school record, and he was nominated for the Butkus Award as a junior and senior.

== Professional career ==
Pre-draft measurables
Height	Weight	Arm length	Hand span	40-yard dash	10-yard split	20-yard split	20-yard shuttle	Three-cone drill	Vertical jump	Broad jump	Bench press
6 ft 1 in (1.85 m)	253 lb (115 kg)	31 1/2 in (0.80 m)	10 1/8 in (0.26 m)	4.70 s	1.64 s	2.70 s	4.24 s	7.32 s	37 in (0.94 m)	9 ft 9 in (2.97 m)	25 reps
All values from NFL Combine.

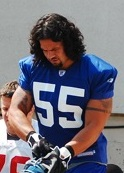
Mitchell at 2007 New York Giants training camp

While playing with the Giants, Mitchell was a resident of Hoboken, New Jersey. Mitchell appeared in Super Bowl XLII, and recorded 8 tackles and a sack.

On February 29, 2008, the Buffalo Bills signed Mitchell to a five-year contract for US$17.5 million (equivalent to about $26.2M in 2025). Mitchell was expected to take over the starting weakside linebacker position that was shared by Coy Wire and Keith Ellison in 2007. On September 10, 2010, two days before their season started, the Bills put Mitchell on the IR, ending his season.

== NFL career statistics ==
Legend
**Bold**	Career high

=== Regular season ===
Year	Team	Games		Tackles					Interceptions					Fumbles			
Year	Team	GP	GS	Cmb	Solo	Ast	Sck	TFL	Int	Yds	TD	Lng	PD	FF	FR	Yds	TD
2003	KAN	12	6	21	17	4	0.0	0	1	3	0	3	1	0	0	0	0
2004	KAN	15	12	74	60	14	1.0	9	0	0	0	0	3	1	**2**	**39**	**1**
2005	KAN	**16**	**16**	**105**	**84**	21	2.0	8	1	0	0	0	**11**	0	**2**	0	0
2006	KAN	**16**	**16**	104	82	22	1.5	5	1	23	0	23	3	0	1	0	0
2007	NYG	**16**	**16**	77	54	23	3.5	6	1	20	1	20	4	**2**	1	17	**1**
2008	BUF	**16**	15	82	57	**25**	**4.0**	**10**	**2**	**33**	0	**32**	3	**2**	0	0	0
2009	BUF	5	5	27	17	10	0.0	0	0	0	0	0	0	1	0	0	0
2010	NOR	1	0	2	2	0	1.0	0	0	0	0	0	0	0	0	0	0
		97	86	492	373	119	13.0	38	6	79	1	32	25	6	6	56	2

=== Playoffs ===
Year	Team	Games		Tackles					Interceptions					Fumbles			
Year	Team	GP	GS	Cmb	Solo	Ast	Sck	TFL	Int	Yds	TD	Lng	PD	FF	FR	Yds	TD
2003	KAN	1	1	5	5	0	0.0	0	0	0	0	0	0	0	0	0	0
2006	KAN	1	1	13	9	4	0.0	0	0	0	0	0	0	0	0	0	0
2007	NYG	**4**	**3**	**20**	**12**	**8**	**2.0**	**2**	0	0	0	0	**1**	0	0	0	0
2010	NOR	1	0	1	1	0	0.0	0	0	0	0	0	0	0	0	0	0
		7	5	39	27	12	2.0	2	0	0	0	0	1	0	0	0	0

== Personal life ==
Mitchell and his wife Billie have a son, Lewai (pronounced Levi) who followed in his footsteps at playing football for the University of South Florida. He also has a daughter, Eliza. In 2007, Mitchell donated his game check from week 15 to Gridiron Greats which helps retired football players in dire need.
