= J. R. Reed (American football, born 1982) =

American football player (born 1982)

No. 30, 32
- Position: Safety

Personal information
- Born: February 11, 1982 (age 44); Tampa, Florida, U.S.
- Listed height: 5 ft 11 in (1.80 m)
- Listed weight: 202 lb (92 kg)

Career information
- High school: Hillsborough (Tampa)
- College: South Florida
- NFL draft: 2004: 4th round, 129th overall pick

Career history
- Philadelphia Eagles (2004–2005); St. Louis Rams (2006); Atlanta Falcons (2006); New York Giants (2007)*; Philadelphia Eagles (2007–2008); New York Jets (2008); Florida Tuskers (2010)
- * Offseason or practice squad member only

Career NFL statistics
- Total tackles: 63
- Pass deflections: 4
- Stats at Pro Football Reference

Herbert Lee "J. R." Reed Jr. (born February 11, 1982) is an American former professional football player who was a safety in the National Football League (NFL). He was selected by the Philadelphia Eagles in the fourth round of the 2004 NFL draft. He played football at Hillsborough High School to later go on and play college football for the South Florida Bulls. He is the school's career leader in interceptions.

Reed was also a member of the St. Louis Rams, Atlanta Falcons, New York Giants, and New York Jets.

== Professional career ==
Pre-draft measurables
Height	Weight
5 ft 10 1/2 in (1.79 m)	201 lb (91 kg)
Values from Pro Day

=== Philadelphia Eagles (first stint) ===
In early 2005, Reed suffered an injury which ended his 2005 season. While jumping a fence near his home in Tampa, Reed cut the back of his knee and sustained damage to the peroneal nerve that affects movement in his lower leg and foot.

He returned to the Eagles with the aid of a special brace and played in the Pro Football Hall of Fame game against the Oakland Raiders on August 6, 2006. Reed's comeback was cut short as the Eagles released him on the final day of cuts before the season.

=== St. Louis Rams ===
In October 2006, Reed was signed by the St. Louis Rams as a kick returner for the 2006 season, but he was cut after playing in six games.

=== Atlanta Falcons ===
Reed signed with the Atlanta Falcons in December of that year to provide depth for Atlanta's depleted secondary. The Falcons cut him following the season.

=== New York Giants ===
He signed with the New York Giants for their 2007 training camp but was released on the final day of cuts.

=== Philadelphia Eagles (second stint) ===
The Eagles re-signed him the next day. However, Reed muffed a critical punt late in the first game of the season against the Green Bay Packers. This led to his subsequent release and the Eagles' signing of Reno Mahe. However, he was re-signed within weeks to back up injured All-Pro safety Brian Dawkins. Reed has since returned to the Eagles' special teams and has resumed his role of kick returner. In a week 12 game against the New England Patriots, Reed was named the starter at the strong safety position when Sean Considine and Quintin Mikell could not play due to injuries.

Reed spent the first seven weeks of the 2008 season with the Eagles, appearing in five games and recording three tackles. He was released on October 21 to make room for fullback Kyle Eckel.

=== New York Jets ===
Reed was signed by the New York Jets on December 10, 2008, after the team waived running back Marcus Mason.
