= Shurron Pierson =

American football player (1982–2024)

No. 55, 98
- Positions: Linebacker, defensive end

Personal information
- Born: May 31, 1982; Inverness, Florida, U.S.
- Died: February 7, 2024 (aged 41)
- Listed height: 6 ft 2 in (1.88 m)
- Listed weight: 250 lb (113 kg)

Career information
- High school: Wildwood (Wildwood, Florida)
- College: South Florida
- NFL draft: 2003: 4th round, 129th overall pick

Career history
- Oakland Raiders (2003); Chicago Bears (2004); Orlando Predators (2006)*
- * Offseason or practice squad member only

Career NFL statistics
- Games played: 12
- Total tackles: 12
- Stats at Pro Football Reference

Shurron Pierson (May 31, 1982 – February 7, 2024) was an American professional football player who was a linebacker and defensive end for the Oakland Raiders and Chicago Bears of the National Football League (NFL). He was selected by the Raiders in the fourth round of the 2003 NFL draft. He played college football for the South Florida Bulls.

== Early life ==
Pierson was born in Inverness, Florida. He attended Wildwood Middle High School in Wildwood, Florida.

== College career ==
Pierson was a member of the South Florida Bulls football team from 2000 to 2002. He did not play in 2000 due to being academically ineligible. He played in 11 games, starting nine, in 2001, recording 10 sacks, 12 tackles for loss and three forced fumbles. Pierson started all 11 games his junior year in 2002, totaling, 32 tackles (including nine for loss), eight sacks, two forced fumbles, one interception and one blocked kick. He declared for the 2003 NFL draft after his junior season.

== Professional career ==
Pierson was selected by the Oakland Raiders in the fourth round, with the 129th overall pick, of the 2003 NFL draft. He officially signed with the team on July 25, 2003. He was waived on August 31 and signed to the practice squad on September 2. Pierson was promoted to the active roster on November 12 and played in six games for the Raiders during the 2003 season, recording six solo tackles and two assisted tackles.

Pierson was traded to the Chicago Bears on August 30, 2004 for an undisclosed draft pick. He was waived on September 5 and signed to the Bears' practice squad on September 7. He was promoted to the active roster on September 22 and appeared in six games for the Bears in 2004, totaling one solo tackle and three assisted tackles. Pierson was waived by the Bears on September 2, 2005.

Pierson signed with the Orlando Predators of the Arena Football League on October 12, 2005. He was waived on January 20, 2006.

== Death ==
Pierson died on February 7, 2024.
