= Burge =

Burge is a surname. Notable people with the surname include:

- Albert Burge (1889–1943), Australian Rugby player
- Bella Burge (1877–1962), music hall performer and boxing promoter
- Benjamin Burge (born 1980), Australian sport shooter
- Billy Burge (1931–2004), American pool player
- Brent Burge, sound editor
- Christopher Burge, Professor of Biology and Biological Engineering at Massachusetts Institute of Technology
- Cliff Burge, former Australian rules footballer who played with Melbourne
- Constance M. Burge, creator of the Charmed TV series
- David Burge (1930–2013), American pianist, conductor and composer
- Dianne Burge (1943–2024), former Australian sprinter
- Dora Madison Burge(born 1990), sometimes credited professionally as Madison Burge and Dora Madison, is an American actress
- Frank Burge (1894–1958), Australian rugby league player
- Fred Burge (1923–2018), Australian rules footballer
- Gary M. Burge (born 1952), American author and professor
- Gerard Burge (1857–1933), English first-class cricketer active 1885–86
- Gregg Burge (1957–1998), tap dancer and choreographer
- Heather Burge (born 1971), retired professional basketball player
- Heidi Burge (born 1971), retired professional basketball player
- Hubert Murray Burge, Anglican Bishop
- Hugo Burge (1972–2023), British travel executive and entrepreneur
- James Burge (1906–1990), English criminal law barrister, defended Stephen Ward in the Profumo Affair in 1963
- Jeremy Burge (born 1984), emoji historian, founder of Emojipedia, creator of World Emoji Day
- John Burge (born 1961), Canadian composer, music educator, and pianist
- Jon Burge (1947–2018), American convicted felon, former Chicago Police Department detective, commander, and torturer
- Joseph Burge (born 1952), Guatemalan former wrestler who competed in the 1972 Summer Olympics
- Keith Burge (born 1950), Welsh former football referee
- Laidley Burge, represented New South Wales in rugby league
- Lee Burge (born 1993), English professional footballer
- Les Burge (1917–1996), minor league baseball first baseman and manager
- Marcel Burge (born 1972), Swiss rifle shooter
- Maude Burge (1865–1957), New Zealand painter
- Pery Burge (1955–2013), English artist
- Peter Burge (athlete) (born 1974), former Australian long and triple jumper
- Peter Burge (cricketer) (1932–2001), Australian cricketer
- Peter Burge (rugby) (1884–1956), Australian rugby footballer and coach
- Phillip Scott Burge, MC (1895–1918), First World War fighter pilot and flying ace
- Robert Burge (1905–?), rugby union player who represented Australia
- Ronald Burge (born 1932), former professor of physics at King's College London
- Ross Burge, New Zealand musician, who has played drums in bands
- Ryan Burge (born 1988), English footballer
- Sarah Burge (born 1960), British cosmetic surgery proponent
- Sheridan Burge-Lopez (born 1970), Australian swimmer
- Stuart Burge (1918–2002), English film director, actor and producer
- Tristan Burge (born 1985), American football safety
- Tyler Burge (born 1946), Professor of Philosophy at UCLA
- Vernon Burge (1888–1971), aviation pioneer
- Wendy Burge, American figure skater
- William Burge (1786–1849), British lawyer and Privy Councillor

== See also ==
- Burdge
- Burge sisters
- Burge, alternate name for Törbel, hamlet in the Visp district in the Canton of Valais in Switzerland
- Frances Irene Burge Griswold (1826–1900), American poet and author
- Burge House, house located in Houston, Texas, United States, listed on the National Register of Historic Places
- Peter Burge Oval, cricket ground in Brisbane, Australia
- Burge Plantation, historic farm estate in Newborn, Georgia
- Harold Burge Robson (1888–1964), British soldier, barrister and Liberal Party politician
- Bourge
- Bourgue
