= List of University of South Florida alumni =

This list of University of South Florida alumni includes graduates, non-graduate former students and current students of the University of South Florida. There are more than 290,000 alumni of the University of South Florida.

Alumni names are alphabetized within categories.

== Academics ==
- Douglas J. Barrett, graduate of the University of South Florida College of Medicine; served as University of Florida senior vice president for Health Affairs
- Alan Boss, 1973, astrophysicist and chair of multiple International Astronomical Union and NASA grounds
- Jeff Bradstreet, 1976, autism researcher
- Julia R. Burdge, author
- Roberto González Echevarría, 1964, Sterling Professor of Hispanic and Comparative Literatures, Yale University
- Michele Elliott, author, psychologist and founder of child protection charity Kidscape
- Bartley Christopher Frueh, 1992, professor and clinical psychologist
- Lee Kump, 1986, professor of Geosciences, Penn State University
- Rhea Law, 1977, president of the University of South Florida since 2022
- David Mendelblatt, 1998, yachtsman and ophthalmologist
- Saraju Mohanty, 2003, professor of Computer Science & Engineering, University of North Texas
- Michael Rao, 1987, youngest ever university president or chancellor, president of Virginia Commonwealth University
- Maurice A. Robinson, pastor, professor of the New Testament
- Thea Tlsty, professor of pathology at the University of California, San Francisco

== Business ==
- Walid Abukhaled, BS Industrial and management systems engineering, Chief Executive Northrop Grumman in Saudi Arabia
- Jim Atchison, 1988, president/CEO of SeaWorld Entertainment
- Robert B. Carter, 1990, co-chief executive officer and chief information officer of FedEx
- Joie Chitwood III, MBA 1995, Indianapolis Motor Speedway president and COO
- Aaron Fechter, 1973, founder of Creative Engineering Inc., developer of animatronics for theme parks
- George Gatewood, 1965, M.A. 1968, astronomer; retired director, Allegheny Observatory
- David Mearns, 1986, director, Blue Water Recoveries; Guinness World Record holder for deepest shipwreck ever found
- H. Lee Moffitt, 1964, founder, H. Lee Moffitt Cancer Center; former Florida Speaker of the House
- John R. Patrick, 1971, launched the IBM ThinkPad brand as senior marketing executive
- Daniel Ravicher, 1997, lecturer in law at Benjamin N. Cardozo School of Law
- George Reyes, 1976, retired CFO of Google
- Nadine Smith, 1988, Executive Director, Equality Florida
- Austin Walton, 2006, certified NBA agent and owner of Walton Sports Management Group
- Nancy Yasecko, 1975, Principal Instructional Designer at Tyco Learning Technologies
- Jordan B. Zimmerman, MBA 1980, founder and chairman of Zimmerman Advertising

== Entertainment, journalism, and literature ==
- Robert Ashford, professor of law at Syracuse University School of Law
- Nicole Awai, 1996, visual artist
- Guy Babylon, 1979, musician, keyboardist/composer, noted for his work with Elton John
- Joe Barresi, record engineer
- James Carlos Blake, 1969, novelist, winner of LA Times Book Prize
- Bruce G. Blowers, musician
- Elayne Boosler, attended, comedian
- Kim Boyce, singer
- Mike Boylan, 1996, video blogger, storm chaser, creator of Mike's Weather Page
- Mark Consuelos, 1994, actor, ABC's All My Children and Hiram Lodge on Riverdale
- Ann Turner Cook, 1969, mystery novelist, model for the "Gerber baby"
- Philip DeFranco, attended, YouTube celebrity
- Rick Barrio Dill, musician
- Tamsen Fadal, 1992, Lebanese-American television personality, four-time Emmy Award-winning journalist, author, entrepreneur
- Gallagher, born Leo Gallagher, 1970, comedian
- Grace Gealey, 2015, actress, Empire
- Drake Hogestyn, 1977, actor, NBC's Days of Our Lives
- Melissa Howard, 1999, reality show personality, MTV's Real World cast member, Girls Behaving Badly
- Lauren Hutton, attended, actress and model
- Nicole Johnson, 1996, Miss America 1999, author and diabetes advocate
- Michelle Lee, 1997, editor in chief of Allure
- Ann Liguori, 1982, sports radio and television personality, talk show host, journalist, author, and television producer
- Kalup Linzy, 2003, video and performance artist; appeared on General Hospital alongside James Franco
- Lobo, born Roland Kent La Voie, attended, 70s singer
- Aasif Mandvi, attended, actor, writer and regular on The Daily Show With Jon Stewart
- Oliver Mason (born 1979), actor
- Richard Oppel, 1964, journalist, director of American Society of Newspaper Editors
- Barbara Parker, 1973, writer
- Greg Pitts, 1992, actor, Office Space, Normal, Ohio
- Steven Reigns, 1998, poet, activist, educator
- Kerry Sanders, 1982, NBC correspondent
- Greg Schmitz, 1993, 1995, film journalist for Yahoo! Movies and Rotten Tomatoes
- Taneo Sebastian, 2021, member of Filipino boy band Alamat and actor
- Kissy Simmons, 1998, Broadway actress, The Lion King
- Robert Stackhouse, 1965, artist
- Charles Trippy, 2008, bassist for band We The Kings, YouTube celebrity
- Robert Wierzel, 1980, lighting designer
- Kurt Wimmer, 1987, screenwriter and film director
- Tony Zappone, 1969, broadcaster, journalist, photographer

== Government, military and international affairs ==
- Peter Beck, 1978, member of Ohio House of Representatives
- Kurt S. Browning, 1982, 1994, former Florida secretary of state
- Susan C. Bucklew, M.A. 1968, senior judge of the United States District Court for the Middle District of Florida
- Danny Burgess, 2008, youngest mayor of Zephyrhills, at age 26
- John Chiang, 1984, California state controller
- J. Michelle Childs, 1988, judge of United States District Court for the District of South Carolina, nominated by President Barack Obama
- Victor Crist, 1983, member of the Florida State Senate
- Faye Culp, 1993, politician
- Michael S. Devany, vice admiral
- Mario Díaz-Balart, member of the U.S. House of Representatives
- Dale Fischer, 1977, judge of the United States District Court for the Central District of California
- Emilio T. Gonzalez, 1977, former National Security advisor to President Bush
- Justin Hall, 2010, director of Transportation Development, Florida Department of Transportation
- Pam Iorio, M.A. 2001, mayor, City of Tampa
- Doug Jamerson, 1979, former Florida commissioner of education
- Charlie Justice, 1993, member of the Florida State Senate
- Gil Kerlikowske, 1978, M.A. 1985, head of U.S. Customs and Border Protection; former U.S. drug czar, Seattle chief of police
- John Kirby, 1985, retired rear admiral in the United States Navy, coordinator for Strategic Communications at the National Security Council in the White House
- Mark Meadows, A.A. 1980, U.S. congressman, North Carolina
- Zara Rahim, communications strategist and political adviser
- Richard Rahn, 1963, president of Novecon; former VP & chief accountant, U.S. Chamber of Commerce
- Adam M. Robinson, Jr., MBA 1994, vice admiral, 36th U.S. Navy Surgeon General
- Ronda Storms, 1988, Florida state senator

== School of Information ==
- Andrew S. Breidenbaugh, 1996, director of the Tampa-Hillsborough County Public Library System
- Lucia M. Gonzalez, 1991, author and library director
- Angie Drobnic Holan, 2010, editor of PolitiFact.com

== Athletics ==
- Kim Adler, 2011, retired professional bowler and current nurse practitioner; graduated with a Master's of Science in Nursing
- Gary Alexander (born 1969), basketball player
- Nate Allen, attended, safety for the Miami Dolphins
- Chucky Atkins, attended 1992–1996, professional basketball player
- Ed Baird, 1982, sailor, two-time America's Cup winner (1995 and 2007)
- Sam Barrington, 2012, linebacker, Green Bay Packers
- Zak Boggs, soccer player
- Damu Cherry, 2000, Olympic athlete
- Mark Chung, soccer player, member of the U.S. National Team
- Jeff Cunningham, attended 1994–1997, professional player for U.S. Men's National Soccer Team and FC Dallas
- B.J. Daniels, professional football player, Atlanta Falcons, San Francisco 49ers, Seattle Seahawks
- Frank Davis, 2007, pro football guard, Detroit Lions; first Panamanian to play in an NFL game
- Radenko Dobraš (born 1968), Serbian basketball player
- Dom Dwyer, attended 2011, professional footballer for Orlando City SC
- Dale Eggeling, professional golfer
- Christiane Endler, soccer player
- Ken Eriksen, 1983, former USF baseball player, current USF Softball head coach and U.S. National Softball Team manager
- Jane Geddes, 2003, SVP, Operations at World Wrestling Entertainment (WWE), Inc.
- Ross Gload, attended, former Major League Baseball player for the Philadelphia Phillies
- Andre Hall, attended, former professional football running back, Denver Broncos
- Nigel Harris, attended, football player
- Anthony Henry, 2000, Cleveland Browns cornerback
- Brendan Hines-Ike, professional soccer player for KV Kortijk
- Mike Jenkins, '07, Pro Bowl cornerback, Tampa Bay Buccaneers
- Taurus Johnson, attended, former professional football wide receiver, Washington Redskins
- Kenyatta Jones, attended, former NFL tackle, New England Patriots and Washington Redskins
- Tony La Russa, 1969, professional baseball player, manager, and executive
- DeDe Lattimore, NFL player
- Yohance Marshall, 1969, professional footballer for Nay Pyi Taw F.C.
- Terrell McClain, attended, defensive tackle, Carolina Panthers
- Carlton Mitchell, attended, professional football wide receiver, Cleveland Browns
- Kawika Mitchell, 2002, Kansas City Chiefs linebacker
- Jerome Murphy, attended, cornerback, Denver Broncos
- Troy Perkins, attended 2000–2002, professional soccer goalkeeper, Montreal Impact
- Jason Pierre-Paul, attended, defensive end for the Tampa Bay Buccaneers, two-time Super Bowl Champion (XLVI and LV)
- Paige Railey, 2010, three-time Summer Olympian for the U.S. sailing team (2012, 2016, 2020)
- Mistral Raymond, attended, defensive back, Minnesota Vikings
- J.R. Reed, attended, Philadelphia Eagles safety
- Victor Rudd (born 1991), basketball player for Maccabi Tel Aviv of the Israeli Basketball Premier League and the Euroleague
- George Selvie, 2009, defensive end for the St. Louis Rams
- Derrick Sharp, 1993, American-Israeli professional basketball player
- Eric Sim, 2010, professional baseball player and Youtuber
- Neven Subotić, attended, professional soccer defender for Borussia Dortmund
- Evelyne Viens, 2019, soccer player, gold medalist at 2020 Summer Olympics
- David Villar (born 1997), baseball player for the San Francisco Giants
- Kayvon Webster, 2013, cornerback, Denver Broncos
- Roy Wegerle, attended (1982–83), retired Major League Soccer player
- Jacquian Williams, attended, linebacker, New York Giants

== Miscellaneous ==
- Joybubbles, early phone phreak who figured out how to place free long-distance phone calls by whistling the correct tone as a USF student in the 1960s
- Debra Lafave, teacher who pled guilty to lewd or lascivious battery against a teenager
- John E. Miller III, bishop in the Anglican Church in North America
