= UConn Huskies men's ice hockey statistical leaders =

The UConn Huskies ice hockey statistical leaders are individual statistical leaders of the UConn Huskies men's ice hockey program in various categories, including goals, assists, points, and saves. Within those areas, the lists identify single-game, single-season, and career leaders. The Huskies represent the University of Connecticut in the NCAA's Hockey East.

UConn began competing in intercollegiate ice hockey in 1960. These lists are updated through the end of the 2023–24 season.

Players active in the 2025–26 season are marked in bold.

== Goals ==
Career
Rk	Player	Goals	Seasons
1	Todd Krygier	99	1984–85 1985–86 1986–87 1987–88
2	Bryan Krygier	92	1988–89 1989–90 1990–91 1991–92
3	Ryan Equale	79	1992–93 1993–94 1994–95 1995–96
4	Jeff Ray	78	1988–89 1989–90 1990–91 1991–92
5	Tom Dyroff	71	1973–74 1974–75 1975–76 1976–77
6	Harry Geary	70	1984–85 1985–86 1986–87
7	D.J. LeBlanc	68	1990–91 1991–92 1992–93 1993–94
8	Dave L'Ecuyer	66	1979–80 1980–81 1981–82 1982–83
	Russ Hintz	66	1963–64 1964–65 1965–66
10	Bryan Quinn	64	1991–92 1992–93 1993–94 1994–95

Season
Rk	Player	Goals	Season
1	Bryan Krygier	38	1991–92
2	Harry Geary	34	1985–86
3	Todd Krygier	32	1987–88
4	Jeff Ray	30	1991–92
5	Todd Krygier	29	1985–86
	**Joey Muldowney**	29	2024–25
7	Russ Hintz	27	1965–66
8	Mike Krygier	26	1991–92
	Russ Hintz	26	1964–65
10	D.J. LeBlanc	25	1992–93
	Ryan Equale	25	1994–95

Single Game
Rk	Player	Goals	Season	Opponent
1	Kevin Walsh	6	1990–91	Quinnipiac
2	Brian Sutherland	5	1991–92	Trinity

== Assists ==
Career
Rk	Player	Assists	Seasons
1	Bryan Krygier	127	1988–89 1989–90 1990–91 1991–92
2	Ryan Equale	109	1992–93 1993–94 1994–95 1995–96
3	Todd Krygier	101	1984–85 1985–86 1986–87 1987–88
4	Brian Sutherland	92	1990–91 1991–92 1992–93 1993–94
5	Hudson Schandor	89	2020–21 2021–22 2022–23 2023–24 2024–25
6	Bryan Quinn	85	1991–92 1992–93 1993–94 1994–95
7	Mike Krygier	81	1989–90 1990–91 1991–92 1992–93
8	D.J. LeBlanc	80	1990–91 1991–92 1992–93 1993–94
	Ken Hunt	80	1980–81 1981–82 1982–83 1983–84
10	Dave L'Ecuyer	79	1979–80 1980–81 1981–82 1982–83

Season
Rk	Player	Assists	Season
1	Bryan Krygier	54	1991–92
2	Ryan Equale	41	1995–96
3	Todd Krygier	39	1987–88
4	Mike Krygier	37	1991–92
5	Chris Potter	36	1991–92
6	Bryan Krygier	33	1990–91
7	Bryan Quinn	32	1994–95
8	Tim Brown	31	1987–88
	Harry Geary	31	1986–87
	Hudson Schandor	31	2024–25

Single Game
Rk	Player	Assists	Season	Opponent
1	Todd Krygier	7	1987–88	Oswego
2	Todd Krygier	6	1987–88	Bowdoin
3	Ciro Longobardi	5	2000–01	Bentley
4	Brian Burns	4	2003–04	Canisius
	Chris Uber	4	2005–06	AIC
	Jason Krispel	4	2008–09	Army
	**Jake Richard**	4	2024–25	Boston University

== Points ==
Career
Rk	Player	Points	Seasons
1	Bryan Krygier	219	1988–89 1989–90 1990–91 1991–92
2	Todd Krygier	200	1984–85 1985–86 1986–87 1987–88
3	Ryan Equale	188	1992–93 1993–94 1994–95 1995–96
4	Brian Sutherland	153	1990–91 1991–92 1992–93 1993–94
5	Jeff Ray	151	1988–89 1989–90 1990–91 1991–92
6	Bryan Quinn	149	1991–92 1992–93 1993–94 1994–95
7	D.J. LeBlanc	148	1990–91 1991–92 1992–93 1993–94
	Harry Geary	148	1984–85 1985–86 1986–87
9	Dave L'Ecuyer	145	1979–80 1980–81 1981–82 1982–83
10	Mark Kosinski	136	1982–83 1983–84 1984–85 1985–86

Season
Rk	Player	Points	Season
1	Bryan Krygier	92	1991–92
2	Todd Krygier	71	1987–88
3	Mike Krygier	63	1991–92
4	Ryan Equale	62	1995–96
5	Jeff Ray	60	1991–92
6	Harry Geary	58	1985–86
7	Bryan Krygier	56	1990–91
	Todd Krygier	56	1985–86
9	Harry Geary	53	1986–87
	Ryan Equale	53	1994–95
	Bryan Quinn	53	1994–95

Single Game
Rk	Player	Points	Season	Opponent
1	Todd Krygier	9	1987–88	Oswego
2	Kevin Walsh	8	1990–91	Quinnipiac
3	Kurt Kamienski	6	2000–01	Bentley
	Todd Krygier	6	1987–88	Bowdoin
5	Jonny Evans	5	2019–20	UNH
	Alex Gerke	5	2011–12	SHU
	Ciro Longobardi	5	2000–01	Bentley
	Scott McDougall	5	*2005–06	Canisius

== Saves ==
Career
Rk	Player	Saves	Seasons
1	Garrett Bartus	3293	2009–10 2010–11 2011–12 2012–13
2	J.T. Marcoux	2793	1984–85 1985–86 1986–87 1987–88
3	Louis Parker	2723	1972–73 1973–74 1974–75 1975–76
4	Rob Nichols	2658	2013–14 2014–15 2015–16 2016–17
5	Beau Erickson	2431	2006–07 2007–08 2008–09
6	Damen Dawson	2267	1988–89 1989–90 1990–91 1991–92
7	Scott Tomes	2165	2003–04 2004–05 2005–06 2006–07
8	Marc Senerchia	2158	1996–97 1997–98 1998–99 1999–00
9	Tomas Vomacka	1946	2018–19 2019–20 2020–21
10	Adam Húska	1903	2016–17 2017–18 2018–19

Season
Rk	Player	Saves	Season
1	Garrett Bartus	1179	2011–12
2	Garrett Bartus	1085	2010–11
3	Rob Nichols	1052	2014–15
4	Tyler Muszelik	967	2025–26
5	Beau Erickson	947	2007–08
6	Scott Tomes	942	2003–04
7	Beau Erickson	936	2008–09
8	Darion Hanson	932	2021–22
9	Tomas Vomacka	910	2019–20
10	Doug Michals	842	1992–93
