= Billy Joe =

Billy Joe, Billie Joe, Billie Jo and Billie-Jo are compound given names which may refer to:

== Men ==
- Billie Joe Armstrong (born 1972), lead vocalist for Green Day
- Billy Joe Burge (1931–2004), American pool player
- Billy Joe Daugherty (1952–2009), American Christian pastor
- Billy Joe DuPree (born 1950), American football player
- Billy Joe Hobert (born 1971), American football player
- Billy Joe Royal (1942–2015), American country and pop singer
- Billy Joe Shaver (1939–2020), American country singer-songwriter
- Billy Joe Tolliver (born 1966), American football player
- Billy Joe Hunter, a pseudonym of Lew Bedell (1919–2000), American music business executive and comic
- Billy Joe Roper Jr., American neo-Nazi and founder of the hate group White Revolution

== Women ==
- Billie-Jo Jenkins (1983–1997), English teen murder victim
- Billie Jo Spears (1938–2011), American country music singer born Billie Jean Moore

== See also ==
- Bill Anoatubby (born 1945), Governor of the Chickasaw Nation
- Billy Crawford (born 1982), Filipino musician and actor
- Red McCombs (1927–2023), American businessman
- "Don't Take Your Guns to Town" (1958), a song by Johnny Cash about a cowboy named Billy Joe
- "Mama Said (The Shirelles song)" (1961), a song with lyrics referring a boy named Billy Joe
- "Ode to Billie Joe" (1967), a song by Bobbie Gentry
  - Ode to Billie Joe (album), Bobbie Gentry album named after the song
  - Ode to Billy Joe (film), a 1976 film inspired by the song
- Billy Joe Cobra, in the 2013 UK-French animated TV series Dude, That's My Ghost!, voiced by Darren Foreman
