= UConn Huskies men's ice hockey =

US college ice hockey team

- Current season
- University: University of Connecticut
- Conference: Hockey East
- Head coach: Mike Cavanaugh; 13th season, 158–182–38 (.468)
- Assistant coaches: Tyler Helton; Vince Stalletti; Nick Peruzzi; Alex Westlund
- Arena: Toscano Family Ice Forum Cap. 2,691; PeoplesBank Arena (Some Games) Cap. 15,635; Storrs, Connecticut and Hartford, Connecticut
- Colors: National flag blue and white

NCAA tournament appearances
- 2025, 2026

Conference tournament champions
- MAAC: 2000

Conference regular season champions
- ECAC East: 1992

The UConn Huskies men's ice hockey team is a National Collegiate Athletic Association (NCAA) Division I college ice hockey program that represents the University of Connecticut. The Huskies are a member of the Hockey East conference. The Huskies play in the on-campus Toscano Family Ice Forum, having moved from the PeoplesBank Arena in Hartford, Connecticut during the 2022–23 season.

== History ==
The Huskies men's ice hockey program began in 1960 under head coach John Chapman. UConn began NCAA competition at the NCAA Division III level in the ECAC East.

Prior to 1998, the Huskies played all home games outdoors at a partially enclosed rink on-campus near Memorial Stadium. The UConn Hockey Rink had a roof but was open on the sides. However, in preparation for the upgrade to Division I, the University built the Mark Edward Freitas Ice Forum. Construction began in 1996, and the first indoor home game for UConn was on November 7, 1998.

The move to NCAA Division I status allowed the team to join other Husky athletic programs. In 1998 they joined the Metro Atlantic Athletic Conference, after previously playing for 38 years in the Division III ECAC East. At the time, head coach Bruce Marshall was in his tenth season at the position. In its 2nd season in the 2000 MAAC Men's Ice Hockey Tournament, UConn beat Iona 6-1 to win its 1st league championship. However, due to a 2-year probationary period placed on the MAAC for an automatic bid to the NCAA Ice Hockey championship by the league champion, UConn was unable to participate in the NCAA tournament that year. It has been the only championship UConn has won since moving to Division I. When the athletic department was forced to remove all athletic scholarships from hockey to comply with Title IX, the Huskies then consistently finished in the bottom few spots of the national computer rankings. In 2003, the MAAC formed a new league called Atlantic Hockey.

In June 2010, the University announced that the team would face Sacred Heart at Rentschler Field in East Hartford on February 13, 2011, as part of a doubleheader also featuring a game between the women's team and the Providence Friars. The Huskies won this game 3-1, in front of 1,711 fans. The Huskies also played their first ever game at the XL Center in downtown Hartford that year, though this was not originally scheduled. Due to heavy snow accumulation on the Freitas roof, the team's February 5 game against Army was moved to the off-camps arena, also home to the Connecticut Whale of the American Hockey League. In spite of free admission, only 891 fans turned up on short notice to watch the Huskies lose 5-3. As a whole, the 2010-11 season was also a major improvement for the Huskies, who advanced to the Atlantic Hockey Tournament semifinals at Blue Cross Arena before being eliminated. They finished with a final record of 16-18-4. One of the major factors in the turnaround was the young recruits the Huskies had signed. Freshman Cole Schneider led the team with 32 points, while sophomore Sean Ambrosie finished second with 29. Meanwhile, sophomore Garrett Bartus set a school record with 1,085 saves. The 2011-12 AHA preseason rankings reflected the newly gained reputation, with the Huskies ranked fifth out of twelve teams. The Huskies posted a winning record once again in the 2012-13 season.

On June 21, 2012, UConn announced the program would join Hockey East as the conference's 12th member beginning in the 2014-15 season. Prior to the move into Hockey East, on January 7, 2013, head coach Bruce Marshall resigned after 25 years and was replaced in interim by Asst. Dave Berard. The season ended with a record of 17-13-4. The team finished 4th in the AHA, drawing a crowd of 1438 for their final home game of the season against Sacred Heart. As part of the move from Atlantic Hockey to Hockey East, the university added 18 scholarships for the men's ice hockey team and additional scholarships to existing women's sports programs to meet Title IX gender equity requirements. The university also investigated options to significantly renovate the Freitas Ice Forum, which has a seating capacity around 2,000 fans, and mostly consists of metal bleachers; or build a new, larger ice arena on-campus. As a new member of Hockey East, the team played home games at the 15,635-seat former NHL arena, the XL Center in downtown Hartford, with other select (home) games at the Webster Bank Arena in Bridgeport. A study by the university projected a cost around $20,000 a game to play at the XL Center.

Head coach Mike Cavanaugh, who spent 18 seasons as an assistant at Boston College, was hired to guide UConn into their new era of scholarship hockey in the Hockey East. He coached Uconn's final season (2013–14) in Atlantic Hockey to a record of 18-14-4, with wins over future Hockey East opponents Providence and UMass, while playing to a 2-2 tie with eventual 2014 NCAA Champ Union . UConn made a successful transition to Hockey East in 2014-15 as they finished in the top 10 nationally in home attendance (5,396) while also leading their new conference . They were also competitive on the ice as their transition year resulted in 4 wins over top 20 teams while gaining ties with national championship game finalists Providence and Boston University. Starting in the 2015-16 season, all home games were played at the XL Center, which drew a much better attendance per game (5,879) than those at the Webster Bank Arena (2,900) in which UConn appeared during the 2014-15 season.

Groundbreaking took place on May 22, 2021 to start construction for UConn's new $48 million ice hockey rink at the Storrs campus, for an opening in fall 2022. The 2,600-seat Toscano Family Ice Forum opened in January 2023 adjacent to the current Freitas Ice Forum in the Athletics District on Jim Calhoun Way. The team facilities also include team lounges; dry locker area and locker rooms with video displays; training space with a hydrotherapy area; strength and conditioning room; and other areas such as coaches' offices. The 97,300-square-foot facility meets all NCAA Division I ice hockey requirements and all Hockey East regulations, which the Freitas Ice Forum did not.

== Season-by-season results ==
Source:

== Coaching staff ==
The Huskies are coached by Mike Cavanaugh, the fourth head coach in program history.

=== All-time coaching records ===
As of completion of 2024–25 season

| Tenure | Coach | Years | Record | Pct. |
|---|---|---|---|---|
| 1960–1981 | John Chapman | 21 | 196–221–7 | .471 |
| 1981–1988 | Ben Kirtland | 7 | 85–98–2 | .465 |
| 1988–2012 | Bruce Marshall | 25 | 332–377–69 | .471 |
| 2012–2013 | David Berard | 1 ^{†} | 19–10–3 | .641 |
| 2013–present | Mike Cavanaugh | 12 | 158–182–38 | .468 |
| Totals | 5 coaches | 65 seasons | 813-900-123 | .476 |

† David Berard served as an interim head coach after Bruce Marshall took a medical leave of absence.

== Awards and honors ==
=== NCAA ===
==== All-Americans ====
AHCA Second Team All-Americans

- 2020–21: Jonny Evans, F
- 2021–22: Ryan Tverberg, F
- 2024–25: Joey Muldowney, F

=== ECAC East ===
==== All-Conference Teams ====
First Team

- 1991–92: Chris Potter, D; Bryan Krygier, F
- 1992–93: Chris Potter, D
- 1994–95: Bryan Quinn, F
- 1995–96: Ryan Equale, F

Second Team

- 1987–88: Todd Krygier, F
- 1989–90: Bryan Krygier, F
- 1990–91: Bryan Krygier, F
- 1991–92: Mike Krygier, F
- 1993–94: D. J. LeBlanc, F
- 1997–98: Eric Linkowski, D

=== MAAC ===
==== Individual awards ====
MAAC Defensive Rookie of the Year

- Eric Nelson, D: 2002

MAAC Tournament Most Valuable Player

- Marc Senerchia, G: 2000

==== All-Conference Teams ====
First Team

- 1998–99: Geoff Angell, F
- 2001–02: Mike Boylan, D

Second Team

- 1998–99: Rob Martin, D
- 2000–01: Michael Goldkind, F

Rookie Team

- 1998–99: Jon Chain, G; Mike Boylan, D
- 2000–01: Eric Nelson, D
- 2001–02: Adam Rhein, D

=== Atlantic Hockey ===
==== Individual awards ====
Player of the Year

- Tim Olsen, F: 2004

Best Defensive Forward

- Trevor Stewart, C: 2007

Regular Season Goaltending Award

- Matt Grogan: 2013

Regular Season Scoring Trophy

- Tim Olsen, F: 2004

==== All-Conference Teams ====
First Team

- 2003–04: Eric Nelson, D; Tim Olsen, F
- 2004–05: Tim Olsen, F
- 2011–12: Cole Schneider, F

Second Team

- 2006–07: Matt Scherer, F
- 2007–08: Beau Erickson, G
- 2008–09: Sean Erickson, D
- 2011–12: Alex Gerke, D

Third Team

- 2006–07: Sean Erickson, D
- 2012–13: Matt Grogan, G
- 2013–14: Brant Harris, F

Rookie Team

- 2003–04: Scott Tomes, G; Matt Scherer, F
- 2004–05: Brad Smith, G
- 2005–06: Sean Erickson, D
- 2009–10: Alex Greke, D
- 2010–11: Cole Schneider, F

=== Hockey East ===
==== Individual awards ====
Best Defensive Forward

- Jáchym Kondelík: 2022
- Hudson Schandor: 2025

==== All-Conference Teams ====
First Team

- 2021–22: Ryan Tverberg, F

Second Team

- 2015–16: Maxim Letunov, F
- 2017–18: Maxim Letunov, F
- 2021–22: Jáchym Kondelík, F
- 2024–25: Jáchym Kondelík, F; Hudson Schandor, F

Third Team

- 2016–17: Tage Thompson, F
- 2018–19: Karl El-Mir, F
- 2024–25: Jake Richard, F

Rookie Team

- 2015–16: Maxim Letunov, F
- 2022–23: Matthew Wood, F
- 2024–25: Callum Tung, G

== Statistical leaders ==
=== Career points leaders ===
| Player | Years | Games | Goals | Assists | Points | PIM |
|---|---|---|---|---|---|---|
| Bryan Krygier | 1988–1992 | | 92 | 127 | 219 | |
| Todd Krygier | 1984–1988 | | 99 | 101 | 200 | |
| Ryan Equale | 1992–1996 | | 79 | 109 | 188 | |
| Brian Sutherland | 1990–1994 | | 61 | 92 | 153 | |
| Jeff Ray | 1988–1992 | | 78 | 73 | 151 | |
| Bryan Quinn | 1991–1995 | | 64 | 85 | 149 | |
| D. J. LeBlanc | 1990–1994 | | 68 | 80 | 148 | |
| Harry Geary | 1984–1987 | | 70 | 87 | 148 | |
| Dave L'Ecuyer | 1979–1983 | | 66 | 79 | 145 | |
| Mark Kosinski | 1982–1986 | | 59 | 77 | 136 | |

=== Career goaltending leaders ===
GP = Games played; Min = Minutes played; GA = Goals against; SO = Shutouts; SV% = Save percentage; GAA = Goals against average

Minimum 50 Games

| Player | Years | Games | Minutes | W | L | T | GA | SO | SV% | GAA |
|---|---|---|---|---|---|---|---|---|---|---|
| Matt Grogan | 2010–2014 | 59 | 3082 | 25 | 19 | 6 | 119 | 2 | .926 | 2.32 |
| Rob Nichols | 2013–2017 | 93 | 5386 | 31 | 46 | 15 | 239 | 10 | .918 | 2.66 |
| Tomáš Vomáčka | 2018–2021 | 71 | 4195 | 32 | 33 | 5 | 201 | 2 | .906 | 2.87 |
| Marc Senerchia | 1996–2000 | 93 | | | | | | | | 3.02 |
| Garrett Bartus | 2009–2013 | 111 | 6353 | 40 | 58 | 9 | 320 | 5 | .911 | 3.02 |

Statistics current through the start of the 2021-22 season.

== Current roster ==
As of November 12, 2026.

| No. | Nat. | Player | Class | Pos | Height | Weight | DoB | Hometown | Previous team | NHL rights |
|---|---|---|---|---|---|---|---|---|---|---|
| 1 | (United States) | Kam Hendrickson | Sophomore | G | 6' 2" (1.88 m) | 185 lb (84 kg) | 2006-01-09 | Chanhassen, Minnesota | Waterloo Black Hawks (USHL) | — |
| 2 | (United States) | Brendan Dunphy | Sophomore | D | 6' 5" (1.96 m) | 216 lb (98 kg) | 2006-02-02 | San Diego, California | Wenatchee Wild (WHL) | FLA, 197th overall 2025 |
| 6 | (United States) | Jacob Reese | Freshman | D | 6' 0" (1.83 m) | 187 lb (85 kg) | 2006-06-08 | Boston, New York | Sarnia Sting (OHL) | — |
| 7 | (Canada) | Charlie Morrison | Freshman | D | 6' 4" (1.93 m) | 198 lb (90 kg) | 2007-10-12 | Miramichi, New Brunswick | Quebec Remparts (QMJHL) | NYR, 77th overall 2026 |
| 8 | (United States) | Joey Muldowney (C) | Senior | F | 5' 9" (1.75 m) | 172 lb (78 kg) | 2004-06-05 | Lake View, New York | Des Moines Buccaneers (USHL) | SJS, 172nd overall 2022 |
| 9 | (Canada) | Cole Davis | Freshman | F | 5' 10" (1.78 m) | 187 lb (85 kg) | 2006-06-22 | Sutton, Ontario | Windsor Spitfires (OHL) | — |
| 10 | (United States) | Brittan Alstead | Freshman | F | 5' 10" (1.78 m) | 176 lb (80 kg) | 2006-01-06 | Plymouth, Minnesota | Penticton Vees (WHL) | — |
| 11 | (United States) | Kai Janviriya | Junior | D | 5' 9" (1.75 m) | 175 lb (79 kg) | 2005-04-02 | Bloomfield, Michigan | Lincoln Stars (USHL) | — |
| 12 | (United States) | Carter Sproule | Sophomore | F | 6' 3" (1.91 m) | 207 lb (94 kg) | 2005-02-11 | Grand Forks, North Dakota | Watertown Shamrocks (NAHL) | — |
| 13 | (United States) | Ethan Gardula | Sophomore | F | 6' 1" (1.85 m) | 202 lb (92 kg) | 2005-02-28 | Princeton, Massachusetts | Sioux City Musketeers (USHL) | — |
| 15 | (United States) | Colin Frank | Freshman | F | 5' 9" (1.75 m) | 169 lb (77 kg) | 2006-03-22 | Ladera Ranch, California | Dubuque Fighting Saints (USHL) | — |
| 16 | (Canada) | Jeremy Loranger | Sophomore | F | 5' 9" (1.75 m) | 181 lb (82 kg) | 2007-06-15 | Trois-Rivières, Quebec | University of Nebraska-Omaha (NCHC) | CBJ, 198th overall 2025 |
| 18 | (Canada) | Will McIsaac | Freshman | D | 6' 3" (1.91 m) | 195 lb (88 kg) | 2006-05-26 | Vancouver, British Columbia | Spokane Chiefs (WHL) | STL, 145th overall 2024 |
| 20 | (United States) | Kaden Shahan | Junior | F | 6' 0" (1.83 m) | 177 lb (80 kg) | 2005-05-24 | Everett, Washington | Sioux City Musketeers (USHL) | — |
| 21 | (United States) | Trey Scott (A) | Junior | D | 5' 10" (1.78 m) | 180 lb (82 kg) | 2004-05-04 | Lunenburg, Massachusetts | Omaha Lancers (USHL) | — |
| 22 | (Canada) | Alexandre Blais | Sophomore | F | 5' 10" (1.78 m) | 174 lb (79 kg) | 2005-11-14 | Longueuil, Quebec | Rimouski Océanic (QMJHL) | ANA, 100th overall 2024 |
| 23 | (Canada) | Jesse Heslop | Freshman | F | 5' 11" (1.8 m) | 176 lb (80 kg) | 2006-04-18 | Nanaimo, British Columbia | Everett Silvertips (WHL) | — |
| 24 | (Canada) | Carlin Dezainde | Sophomore | F | 5' 11" (1.8 m) | 173 lb (78 kg) | 2004-12-29 | Calgary, Alberta | Swift Current Broncos (WHL) | — |
| 26 | (United States) | Mike Murtagh (A) | Junior | F | 5' 11" (1.8 m) | 181 lb (82 kg) | 2004-09-11 | East Greenbush, New York | Nanaimo Clippers (BCHL) | — |
| 27 | (United States) | Joseph Odyniec | Sophomore | F | 6' 1" (1.85 m) | 204 lb (93 kg) | 2004-12-13 | Washington, D.C. | Coquitlam Express (BCHL) | — |
| 28 | (Canada) | Anthony Allain-Samaké | Sophomore | D | 6' 2" (1.88 m) | 197 lb (89 kg) | 2007-09-10 | Gatineau, Quebec | Sioux City Musketeers (USHL) | ANA, 168th overall 2025 |
| 29 | (Canada) | Lirim Amidovski | Freshman | F | 6' 1" (1.85 m) | 196 lb (89 kg) | 2006-12-22 | Alliston, Ontario | North Bay Battalion (OHL) | MIN, 121st overall 2025 |
| 30 | (Finland) | Veeti Louhivaara | Freshman | G | 6' 3" (1.91 m) | 207 lb (94 kg) | 2006-02-06 | Jyväskylä, Finland | Chicago Steel (USHL) | NJD, 146th overall 2024 |
| 31 | (United States) | Ryan Sanborn | Sophomore | G | 6' 2" (1.88 m) | 194 lb (88 kg) | 2005-01-15 | Brookfield, Connecticut | Trenton Golden Hawks (OJHL) | — |
| 34 | (Canada) | Owen Simpson | Senior | D | 6' 5" (1.96 m) | 197 lb (89 kg) | 2003-07-01 | Toronto, Ontario | Penticton Vees (BCHL) | — |
| 71 | (Canada) | Ethan Whitcomb | Junior | F | 6' 4" (1.93 m) | 209 lb (95 kg) | 2004-05-13 | St. Catharines, Ontario | Muskegon Lumberjacks (USHL) | — |

== Olympians ==
This is a list of Connecticut alumni were a part of an Olympic team.

| Name | Position | Connecticut Tenure | Team | Year | Finish |
|---|---|---|---|---|---|
| Tage Thompson | Center | 2015–2017 | (United States) USA | 2026 | Gold |

== Huskies in the NHL ==
As of November 12, 2026.

| = NHL All-Star team | = NHL All-Star | = NHL All-Star and NHL All-Star team | = Hall of Famers |

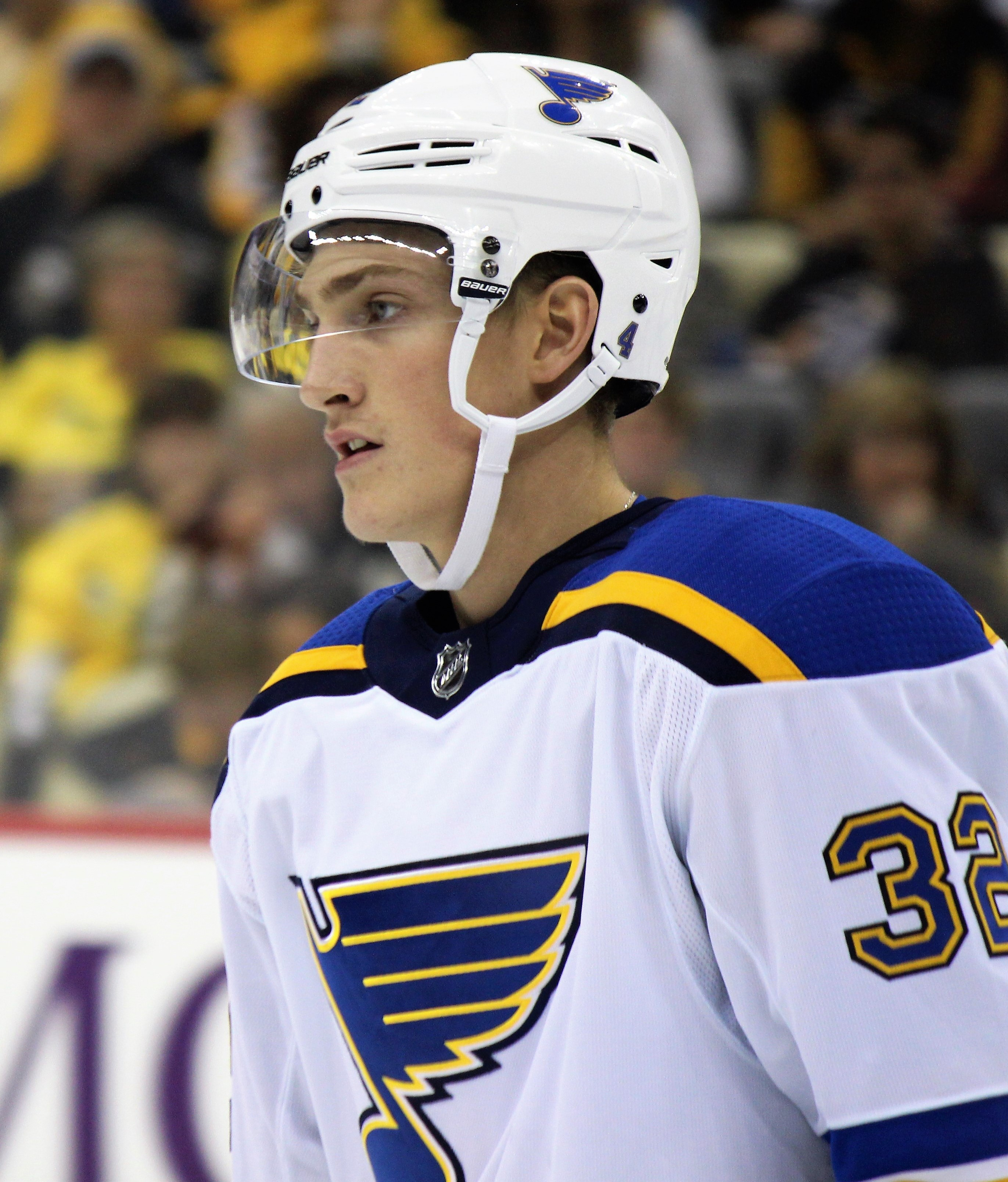
Tage Thompson

| Player | Position | Team(s) | Years | Games | Stanley Cups |
|---|---|---|---|---|---|
| Chase Bradley | Left wing | COL | 2024–2025 | 2 | 0 |
| Marc Gatcomb | Center | NYI, VGK | 2024–present | 108 | 0 |
| Viking Gustafsson Nyberg | Defenseman | MIN | 2025–2026 | 2 | 0 |
| Adam Huska | Goaltender | NYR | 2021–2022 | 1 | 0 |
| Ruslan Iskhakov | Center | NYI | 2023–2024 | 1 | 0 |
| Todd Krygier | Left wing | HFD, WAS, ANA | 1989–1998 | 543 | 0 |
| Yan Kuznetsov | Defenseman | CGY | 2023–present | 76 | 0 |
| Maxim Letunov | Center | SJS | 2019–2020 | 3 | 0 |
| Cole Schneider | Right wing | BUF | 2015–2017 | 6 | 0 |
| Arsenii Sergeev | Goaltender | CGY | 2025–2027 | 2 | 0 |
| Tage Thompson | Center | STL, BUF | 2017–present | 547 | 0 |
| Ryan Tverberg | Center | TOR | 2025–present | 3 | 0 |
| Matthew Wood | Right wing | NSH, SEA | 2024–present | 94 | 0 |
