= Tullio DeSantis =

American artist (born 1948)

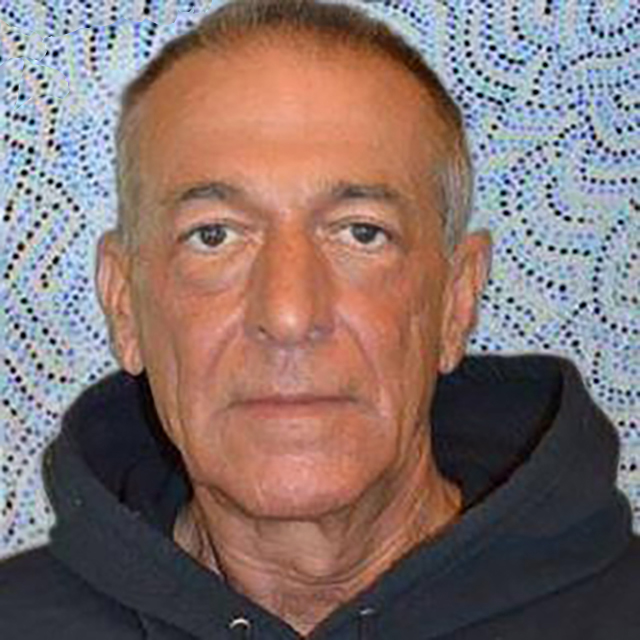
- Born: Tullio Francesco DeSantis; 1948 (age 77–78); Reading, Pennsylvania
- Education: San Francisco Art Institute
- Known for: Visual art, writing, technology

Tullio Francesco DeSantis (born 1948), also known as Tullio, is an American contemporary artist, writer, technologist, and teacher. His work is informed by ancient and contemporary philosophy, science, and the relationship between art and life.

== Biography ==
Tullio DeSantis began his career as a conceptual artist/writer by creating his regular column titled MINDSTREAM, which appeared in the underground press periodical, The Rip Off Review of Western Culture. The publisher of this magazine was the Rip Off Press located in San Francisco in the early 1970s. In 1975 he entered the San Francisco Art Institute, where he graduated with a Master of Fine Arts in 1977.

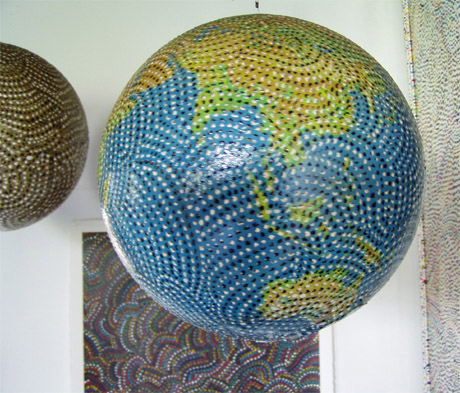
Studio view with, New World 2012, mixed-media sculpture, by Tullio DeSantis, 2009

== Career beginnings ==
Tullio's career as an exhibiting artist began before his graduation and continued in San Francisco through 1979, after which he moved back to the East Coast. During his years in San Francisco, DeSantis' artwork was exhibited by ADI Galleries in San Francisco and Tokyo, Japan. A work on paper by Tullio from this period was exhibited in Paper as Medium a series of national tours by the Smithsonian Institution Traveling Exhibition Service. His work from that time is represented in both public and private collections.

== 1980s ==
DeSantis moved back to the East Coast and took up dual residencies in Reading, Pennsylvania, and New York City, where he maintained a studio in Chelsea. In New York his work was exhibited at the Katherine Markel and Getler Pall galleries. Also in 1980, his work was exhibited by the New York Museum of Modern Art's Lending Service in a traveling exhibition titled Maps.

In 1981 DeSantis began exhibiting his work in the Reading and Berks County area. Among the local and regional exhibitions of note are the shows titled Local Color and Paper Pieces at the Freedman Gallery of Albright College. During the 1980s his work was represented by Marion Locks Gallery in Philadelphia.

In 1982, DeSantis was co-producer of the large-scale multimedia exhibit at the Reading Public Museum titled Mushroom Magic. DeSantis's work from that exhibit included a series of color photographs and artifacts documenting the process of growing mushrooms for the commercial market, artworks on paper and a large acrylic-and-sand painting.

DeSantis mounted his first one-person show in New York City, titled New Worlds at the Tradition 3000 gallery in 1988.

== 1990s ==
The artist's exhibits from the 1990s include 1992's his Reading Lies part IV: Across the You-Niverse, a multi-media installation and performance piece hosted by the Freedman Gallery of Albright College. This was followed another gallery-size multimedia installation, DeSantis' one-person show at the New Arts Program gallery in Kutztown, Pennsylvania, titled The Missing Link.

Tullio's gallery-size installation work was continuously on view at the artist's studio from 1995 to 2004. This magical-realist environment contained, among many interactive components, miniature reconstructed and painted electric trains, papier-mâché landscapes, and a multicolor and infrared light show recreating scenes seen during morning, afternoon, sunset, and night. The long-running work-in-progress was titled The Project and was a tribute to both DeSantis' friend and collaborator, Keith Haring and DeSantis' paternal grandfather, Francesco DeSantis.

From 1982 through 1990 Tullio Francesco DeSantis wrote on art exhibitions and aesthetics for the New Art Examiner, Chicago and at the same time served as art critic for the Reading Eagle/Reading Times newspapers in Pennsylvania. It was in this period that the artist met and worked with Keith Haring. In 1984 DeSantis received a Pennsylvania Council on the Arts Fellowship for his ongoing collaborative conceptual work with Keith Haring. In 1998 and 1999 DeSantis published the first four chapters of this work in the Terminal Journal under the title, Reading Lies Dreaming, published by Eschaton, Chicago. In 2016, the title was changed to "Nothing Dies" and the web site was moved to www.nothingdies.com.

== Other writing ==
Tullio DeSantis' internationally published writing includes a magical-realist story recounting the life of the Francesco DeSantis family and also the art, science, and craft of growing mushrooms for market. Tullio's "Life on a Mushroom Farm", appeared in the book Dreamstreets, Harper and Row, 1989, and has since been reprinted several times.

Tullio's personal and spiritual creative relationship with poet Allen Ginsberg yielded a number of works including a Ginsberg poem dedicated to Tullio DeSantis. and a Ginsberg drawing published at www.poetspath.com.

== Teaching ==
DeSantis' higher-education art-teaching career has spanned the period from 1987 to the present. In 1987 he served as assistant professor of art at Alvernia College, Reading, Pennsylvania. He has continued his teaching as an adjunct professor of art at Albright College, University of St. Francis, Joliet, Illinois, the MFA program of Vermont College, Norwich University, and currently at Reading Area Community College.

In 1990 the American Association of University Professors found and reported in The Chronicle of Higher Education that Tullio DeSantis had been improperly dismissed by Alvernia College (now Alvernia University) because of his criticism of the administration and that his rights of academic freedom had been violated. This incident provoked the resignation of the college president, board chair, and the academic dean. DeSantis' suit with the college was eventually settled out of court. The settlement resulted in his being rehired.

Tullio Francesco DeSantis continued exhibiting his art in the early 1990s in a selected group of galleries including the Freedman Gallery of Albright College and the Reading Public Museum, Reading, PA.

== Internet art ==
From the mid-1990s through the mid-2000s, the artist executed the major portion of his work anonymously on the Internet. The anonymous work was often conducted collaboratively and from 1998 through 2005 he created and worked as part of Artelevision, a three-person online Digital Performance group. This endeavor was analyzed and interpreted by Nick Mamatas in the NYC newspaper, the Village Voice in October, 2000, in an article titled All Hands Off The Keyboard.

This collaborative Internet project is also represented online in the Irish Museum of Modern Art Net Open exhibitions from 2002 and 2003.

The artist's collaborative work is referenced by the New York new art foundation, Franklin Furnace and the CYBERARTS99: International Festival of Digital Media. The artist's collaborations with other Internet artists have included Ana Voog, of anacam.com, and performance artist, Frank Moore, whose site hosts artelevision.com's archives. Additionally, Tullio DeSantis contributed a statement to Frank Moore's book, The Uncomfortable Zones of Fun: The Temescal Period 2009-2013, which can be found on page 701.

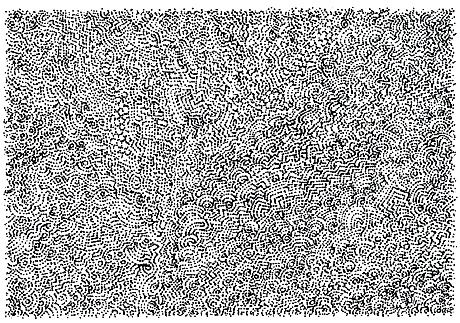
"Veil of Illusion", Ink on Paper Drawing, by Tullio DeSantis, 2009

== ARTology and ARTologyPOD ==
In 2005, Tullio created ARTology, his online blog for the Reading Eagle newspaper web site. In 2006, the artist executed the initial work in a series of identity-based conceptual projects for the new millennium at The New Arts Program in Kutztown, Pennsylvania,. His monoprints are travelled and collected as part of the New Arts Program Print Editions, which includes artist prints by John Cage, Steve Reich, Keith Haring, and Bill T. Jones.

ARTologyPOD, the artists' regular series of conceptual podcasts, appears on www.readingeagle.com, www.weeu.com, and Apple iTunes. DeSantis' discusses his conceptual work and his relationship with Keith Haring in a series of YouTube videos, produced by Ron Schira.

In 2013, Tullio retired ARTologyPOD podcasts and moved his ARTology blog from the Reading Eagle Online to its own domains at www.tulliodesantis.net and www.artology.tv.

== Recent and current work ==
Tullio DeSantis is referenced in Keith Haring's official biography the Rizzoli illustrated edition titled Keith Haring (2008), and the 2008 film, The Universe of Keith Haring.

The collaborative project between Keith Haring and Tullio DeSantis is the subject of a documentary project being executed by Canadian filmmaker and collector, Victor Lallouz. Filming for this project began in 2009 with locations in Berks County, PA and New York City. Filming for this project resumed in New York City in 2017.

DeSantis and Haring initiated this collaborative project in 1985. DeSantis describes the project in an introductory video that has been posted on YouTube in raw footage. These videos contain a recent lecture in which DeSantis introduces the purpose of the project. He has continued this work in various media since the day Keith Haring died, February 16, 1990.

Tullio's conceptual work is referenced in the art historical text: The Symbolist Roots of Modern Art, Michelle Facos, ed., 2015, Ashgate pub. ltd., England and USA, p. 92. “In 2006 the New York artist Tullio DeSantis (b. 1948) exhibited Nothing as Art – a text, displayed in black inkjet toner on a sheet of white photocopy paper push-pinned to the gallery wall, which declared that not only was the formal manifestation of an idea unnecessary, but so was the idea itself.” – Andrew Marvick [Andrew Kent-Marvick], Un Coup de dessin: Looking at the Blanks in Mallarme and Khnopff.

== 2010 and beyond ==
In the new decade, Tullio has increased his online presence, continuing his aesthetic interest in the evolutionary potential of the Internet. Presentations of his multimedia work in 2010 include "The Facebook Show" at The Detroit Museum of New Art, and Volume 1 of the "International Email Audio Art Project" hosted by the Internet Archive.

2016 - Exhibition at Point. B Studio, Unique Impressions “More Love Now”. Tullio creates drawings on paper, then digitizes the original to create one light and one dark variation.

=== Brain and Mind ===
2012 DeSantis' "Brain and Mind" was first exhibited in the Brain Art Competition Online Exhibition at neurobureau.org This piece is composed of hand-drawn and computer-generated images superimposed over digitally altered image of human brain and EEG map of artist's brainwaves. In 2016, Tullio's artwork - "Brain and Mind" serves as the Cover Illustration for Biological Psychiatry: Cognitive Neuroscience and Neuroimaging Volume 1, Issue 1 The cover image can be seen here:

=== Tullio's collaborative projects ===
Tullio's collaborative projects in the new decade include working with artist George Blaha, artist/musician Heidi Harris, MaCu(Susanne Hafenscher), writers Jan Walls, Leanne Ogasawara(Tang Dynasty Times), and Robert Burton(Awakening Arts Network).

In 2011, Dr. Tom Fink and Tullio DeSantis created MindReflector Technologies, LLC to produce neurofeedback software and mind-training applications. Their first product, the MindReflector C-1 Neurofeedback Training System, used low-cost EEG-headsets produced by NeuroSky, Inc. MindReflector software used state-of-the art algorithms created by Dr. Fink to train the brain for optimal performance and functioning, using audio and visual cues. DeSantis managed MindReflector development and composed the audio track for MindReflector training. He collaborated with contemporary artists and engineers to extend MindReflector technology and multimedia. The MindReflector® Neurofeedback Training System was sold by NeuroSky and distributed internationally. In 2021, MindReflector stopped marketing software and continues as a psychology and neurofeedback research organization.

April 2012, Tullio DeSantis and Pery Burge have collaborated on multimedia projects that involved narrative readings, music by Tullio and visual fluid imagery created by Pery Burge.

2014 - The Art of Collaboration: Dee Shapiro and Tullio DeSantis - Heckscher Museum of Art, Huntington, NY

2016 - More Love Now - Point.B Studio, Point Orford, OR

2010 – 2020 – Image, audio, and Video collaborations with Barbara Schedl

2019 – The Art of Music with Dick Boak – Goggleworks, Reading, PA

2018/2019 – Hadron Collider of Love w Dick Boak, 273 Bleecker St. NY, NY

2021 – Tullio's digital artwork appears as NFT crypto art on Rarible

2024 - Tullio begins artistic collaboration with UK artist, Scarlet Monahan . Their work includes mixed-media audio and video, artwork, photography, and digital art. Scarlet and Tullio are working on a collaborative project under the name, "Coup de Tete".

In 2025, DeSantis was featured in an interview on Meg Johnson’s blog, discussing his artistic philosophy, history, and recent projects.

In 2025, Tullio began an exclusive international representation arrangement with Galerie De Bellefeuille, Montreal and Toronto, Canada . His mixed-media painting, “New World Map – Mind” was exhibited in the Palm Beach Modern and Contemporary international art fair (Art Miami 2024 | Galerie de Bellefeuille).

Book: Limited Edition Catalog:

- DeSantis, Tullio; Lallouz, Michaela (2019). The project of Keith Haring and Tullio DeSantis. Montreal. ISBN 978-2-9818327-0-2. OCLC 1158985556.
