= Cornbread (disambiguation) =

Cornbread is a generic name for any number of quick breads (a bread leavened chemically, rather than by yeast) containing cornmeal.

It may also refer to:

- Cornbread (album), an album by jazz musician Lee Morgan
- "Cornbread", a 2023 song by Caroline Rose from The Art of Forgetting
- Cedric Maxwell (born 1955), retired National Basketball Association player nicknamed "Cornbread"
- Cornbread Harris (born 1927), American musician
- Hal Singer (1919–2020), American R&B and jazz bandleader and saxophonist
- Cornbread (graffiti artist) (born 1953), American graffitist

== See also ==
- Cornbread Red, American pool player Billy Joe Burge (1931–2004)
- Kornbread Jeté, American drag queen
