= Oldsmar, Florida =

- City
- City of Oldsmar
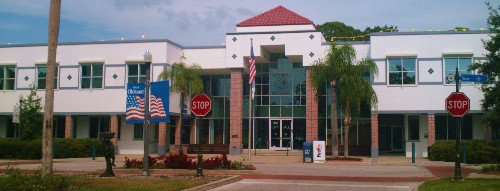
- Oldsmar City Hall

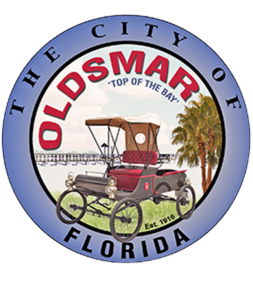
- Seal Logo
- Motto: Top of the Bay
- Location in Pinellas County and the state of Florida
- Coordinates: 28°02′55″N 82°40′11″W
- Country: United States
- State: Florida
- County: Pinellas
- Established: April 12, 1916

Government
  - Type: Council-Manager
  - Body: Council-Manager form of government

Area
  - Total: 10.10 sq mi (26.15 km^{2})
  - Land: 8.95 sq mi (23.17 km^{2})
  - Water: 1.15 sq mi (2.98 km^{2})
- Elevation: 13 ft (4.0 m)

Population (2020)
  - Total: 14,898
  - Density: 1,665.3/sq mi (642.97/km^{2})
- Time zone: UTC−5 (Eastern (EST))
  - Summer (DST): UTC−4 (EDT)
- ZIP Code: 34677
- Area codes: 656, 813
- FIPS code: 12-51350
- GNIS feature ID: 2404428
- Website: www.myoldsmar.com

Oldsmar is a city in Pinellas County, Florida, United States. As of the 2020 census, the city had a population of 14,898. The Oldsmar name dates to April 12, 1916, when automobile pioneer Ransom E. Olds purchased 37,541 acres (151.92 km^{2}) of land north of Tampa Bay to establish a planned community.

== Geography ==
According to the United States Census Bureau, the city has a total area of 9.7 square miles (25.0 km^{2}), of which 8.7 square miles (22.5 km^{2}) is land and 0.97 square miles (2.5 km^{2}) (9.83%) is water.

== History ==
A number of archeological digs in the Oldsmar area revealed small campsites as well as permanent villages that date from the Archaic period (c. 8000 to 1000 BC).

In 1916, Ransom E. Olds purchased 37,541 acres (151.92 km2) on the northern tip of Tampa Bay in order to design a planned community. The property appealed to Olds because of its proximity to several other towns (including Tampa and Tarpon Springs) as well as being located on the Tampa and Gulf Coast division of the Seaboard Air Line Railroad. The town went through a number of name changes. Initially, it was called R. E. Olds-on-the-Bay and then changed to Oldsmar. In 1927 the name was again changed, this time to Tampa Shores. Finally, in 1937, it went back to its old name of Oldsmar.

Shortly after purchasing the property, Olds formed the Reo Farms Company (renamed Reolds Farms Company) in order to administer to the creation of his new town. Architects and city planners were hired to create drafts and laborers were hired for construction. The town possessed the staples of any small town, such as churches, schools, and a bank, as well as a railroad depot, sawmill, and dock facilities on the 10 miles of waterfront that faced Old Tampa Bay. Outside of town, tracts of land were parcelled up for agriculture. To advertise how good the land was for growing crops and raising livestock, the Reolds Farms Company built a model farm. On the farm was a herd of cattle, horses, pigs, and other livestock. They also had plots planted with potatoes, turnips, beets, celery, and citrus fruits, among other crops. An oil well was drilled but was never productive.

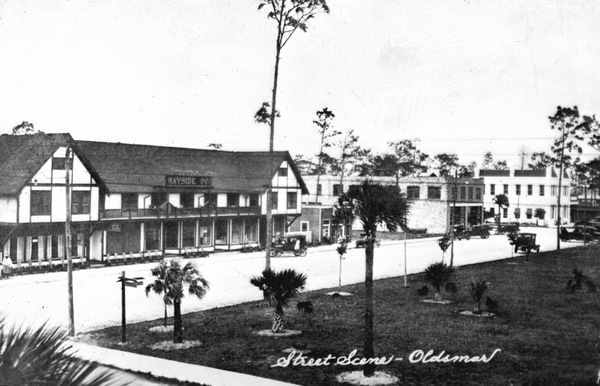
Wayside Inn on State Street. Circa 1920.

The company also initiated a large publicity campaign to attract Northerners into becoming residents. One of the more popular slogans used was "Oldsmar for Health, Wealth and Happiness." Tours were also planned with Pullmans chartered between Detroit and Oldsmar. To accommodate prospective residents and other tourists a 60-room hotel called the Wayside Inn was built.

Olds named some of the roads himself including Gim Gong Road, named after the horticulturalist Lue Gim Gong. Olds had hired Gim Gong to help set up the agricultural community.

Built in 1918 under the supervision of R.E. Olds, the Bank Building has been an important part of Oldsmar's history. Located in the heart of downtown Oldsmar, the building was built in the style of Mediterranean Revival using rare white Italian glazed bricks. In addition to the Oldsmar State Bank, the bank was originally home to the Reolds Farm Co, and the Real Estate Sale Department. By 1920, it was reported to be handling more than $1million worth of deposits.

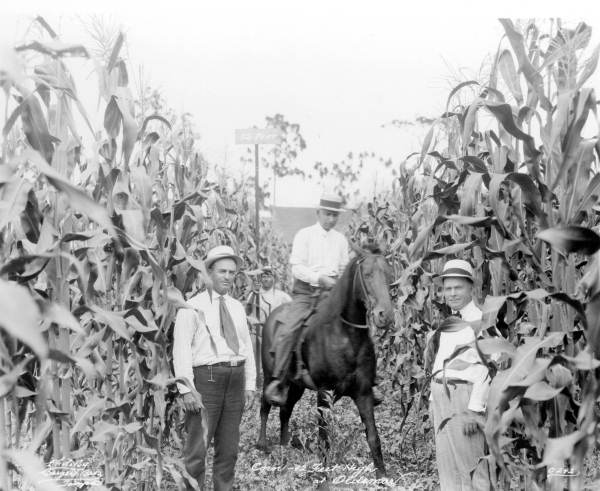
Photograph of 3 men standing amongst corn in Oldsmar, Florida. Circa 1900.

In 1919, the city's first library was started by the Woman's Club. It was donated to the city in 1977.

Original city plans included a golf course and a luxury hotel on the bay, but neither were ever built. A sawmill and foundry were established that made cast-iron engines for tractors and grove heaters. The mill also produced the Olds Chair (also called the Oldsmar Chair). The chair was similar to the popular Adirondack chair and was made out of either yellow pine or cypress.

Olds provided financial backing for the Kardell Tractor and Truck Company to move into town. Renamed Oldsmar Tractor Company, Olds had hoped it would devise a machine to clear out palmetto roots, pine stumps, and other scrub, which all had to be removed by hand otherwise. Eventually, Oldsmar had dairy and agricultural farms and, in the early days, it was a common sight to see cattle and hogs running loose through the town. Aside from peppers, tomatoes, corn, gladiolus, and grapes, a banana plantation was established but the winters proved too harsh and the crops failed.

In 1921, a hurricane hit Tampa Bay. Because Oldsmar sits on a plateau with an elevation never rising over 20 feet (6.1 m) above sea level, it was devastated by the storm. Large trees were uprooted and floodwater reached levels 14 feet (4.3 m) above normal. Some of the homes that survived the storm were moved, by barge, to St. Petersburg in the following two decades.

Olds spent a reported $100,000 drilling an oil well that never yielded. The well is now capped and sits on the grounds of the Tampa Bay Downs Racetrack. Other such wells were dug in Florida; two in the Panhandle and one in Sarasota, but none of them possessed the technology to drill through the Florida aquifer.

By 1923, Olds had over $4.5 million invested ($89.5 million in 2026 dollars) in the community and there was only a population of around 200 inhabitants. When he realized Oldsmar was not growing as anticipated, he began liquidating his assets by first selling unplatted parcels of land. The racetrack was nearly completed when he traded it for the Fort Harrison Hotel in Clearwater. The rest of the land was traded for the Belerive Hotel in Kansas. By the time Olds left town, he had suffered a loss of nearly $3 million. While Olds envisioned a city of 100,000, the population was around 200 when he left.

Harry Elias Prettyman, Sr. (1889-1947), a St. Louis promoter, and his associates continued to sell lots in town following Olds's departure. Prettyman staged promotional gimmicks like Gold Rushes where pieces of gold were buried on a vacant lot and everyone got to dig for it. In 1927 Prettyman was caught selling underwater lots. To avoid scandal, the town of Oldsmar was renamed Tampa Shores. It wasn't until 1935 that the last of the property owned by Olds was finally sold.

== Demographics ==
Historical population
Census	Pop.	Note	%±
1930	280		—
1940	315		12.5%
1950	345		9.5%
1960	878		154.5%
1970	1,538		75.2%
1980	2,608		69.6%
1990	8,361		220.6%
2000	11,910		42.4%
2010	13,591		14.1%
2020	14,898		9.6%
U.S. Decennial Census

=== Racial and ethnic composition ===
Oldsmar racial composition (Hispanics excluded from racial categories) (NH = Non-Hispanic)
Race	Pop 2010	Pop 2020	% 2010	% 2020
White (NH)	10,259	10,175	75.48%	68.30%
Black or African American (NH)	678	685	4.99%	4.60%
Native American or Alaska Native (NH)	24	26	0.18%	0.17%
Asian (NH)	792	811	5.83%	5.44%
Pacific Islander or Native Hawaiian (NH)	10	19	0.07%	0.13%
Some other race (NH)	40	82	0.29%	0.55%
Two or more races/Multiracial (NH)	245	674	1.80%	4.52%
Hispanic or Latino (any race)	1,543	2,426	11.35%	16.28%
Total	13,591	14,898		

=== 2020 census ===
As of the 2020 census, Oldsmar had a population of 14,898. The median age was 41.7 years. 21.1% of residents were under the age of 18 and 16.5% of residents were 65 years of age or older. For every 100 females, there were 91.3 males, and for every 100 females age 18 and over, there were 86.9 males age 18 and over.

100.0% of residents lived in urban areas, while 0.0% lived in rural areas.

There were 5,969 households in Oldsmar, of which 31.9% had children under the age of 18 living in them. Of all households, 49.3% were married-couple households, 15.2% were households with a male householder and no spouse or partner present, and 27.7% were households with a female householder and no spouse or partner present. About 23.3% of all households were made up of individuals, and 9.2% had someone living alone who was 65 years of age or older.

There were 6,283 housing units, of which 5.0% were vacant. The homeowner vacancy rate was 1.1%, and the rental vacancy rate was 5.8%.

=== 2020 ACS estimate ===
The 2016-2020 American Community Survey estimated that 3,707 families resided in the city.

=== 2010 census ===
As of the 2010 United States census, there were 13,591 people, 4,922 households, and 3,495 families residing in the city.

== Economy ==
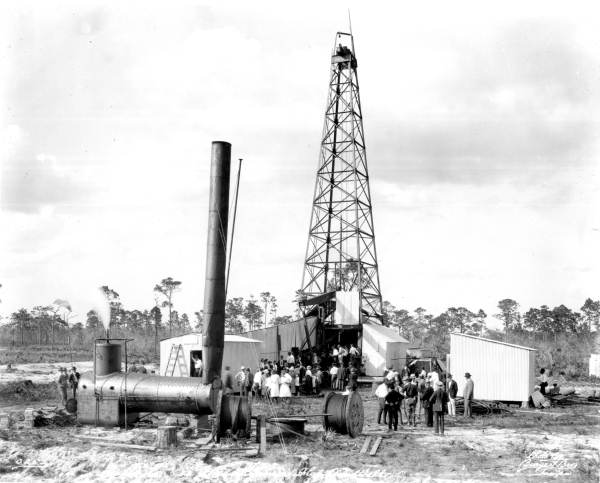
Oil well and drilling equipment - Oldsmar, Florida

Oldsmar hosts an office of Nielsen Media Research. Most of the employees of Nielsen Media Research work in Oldsmar and the company's media measurement work originates from the office. The Associated Press said that the Oldsmar building, with a cost figure of $80 million, was its "nerve center." In 2003 the company moved into its Oldsmar complex and consolidated its employees there, with workers from Dunedin and other areas in Pinellas County moving into the Oldsmar building. Major defense contractor and aerospace company Lockheed Martin has a facility in Oldsmar that employed over 600 people as of 2015.

In 2024 MarineMax moved into a new headquarters at the Nielsen Media Research office park.

== Culture ==
Oldsmar celebrates its history every year with Oldsmar Days and Nights, including parades, car shows (featuring the Oldsmobile), and carnival rides. The celebration is held in Spring.

== Education ==
Oldsmar is part of the Pinellas County Schools district and is served by East Lake High School, Carwise Middle School, Forest Lakes Elementary School, Oldsmar Elementary School, and Oldsmar Christian School.

== Notable people ==
- Troy Baxter Jr., professional NBA basketball player
- Francis Biondi, Finalist on FOX's MasterChef US Season 5 and professional golfer
- Mike Boylan, video blogger, storm chaser, and creator of Mike's Weather Page
- John Brown, professional NBA basketball player
- L.J. Figueroa, professional NBA basketball player
- Cito Gaston, MLB all-star outfielder and two-time World Series Champion
- Nathan Harriel, MLS defender for Philadelphia Union.
- Gene Michael, professional MLB baseball player, and former manager of the New York Yankees
- David Mundell, current BKFC Middleweight Champion and former mixed martial artist
- Artavis Scott, NFL wide receiver

== Gallery ==
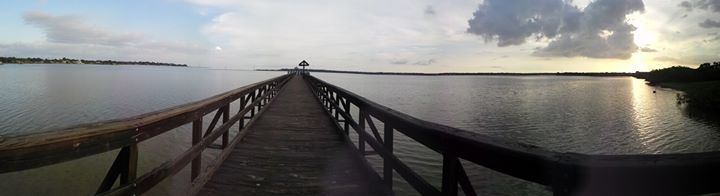
R.E. Olds Park Dock Panoramic photograph into Upper Tampa Bay

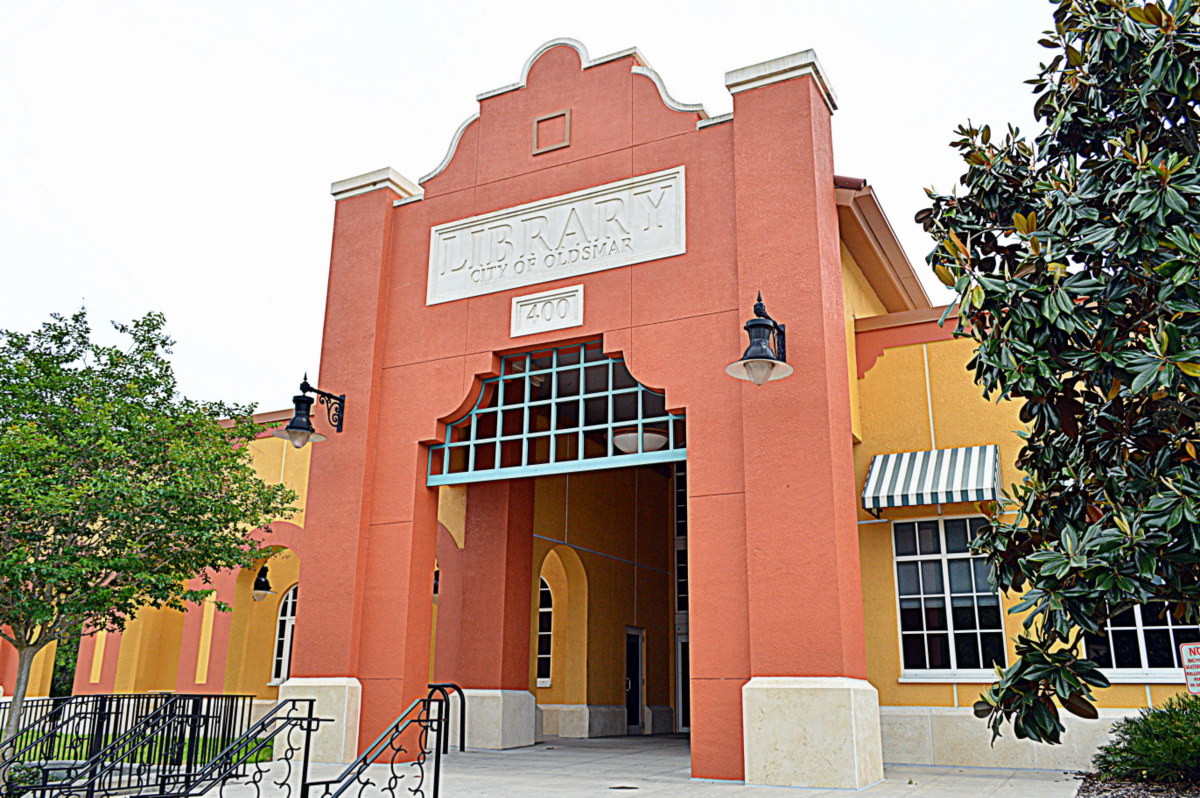
The Oldsmar Public Library

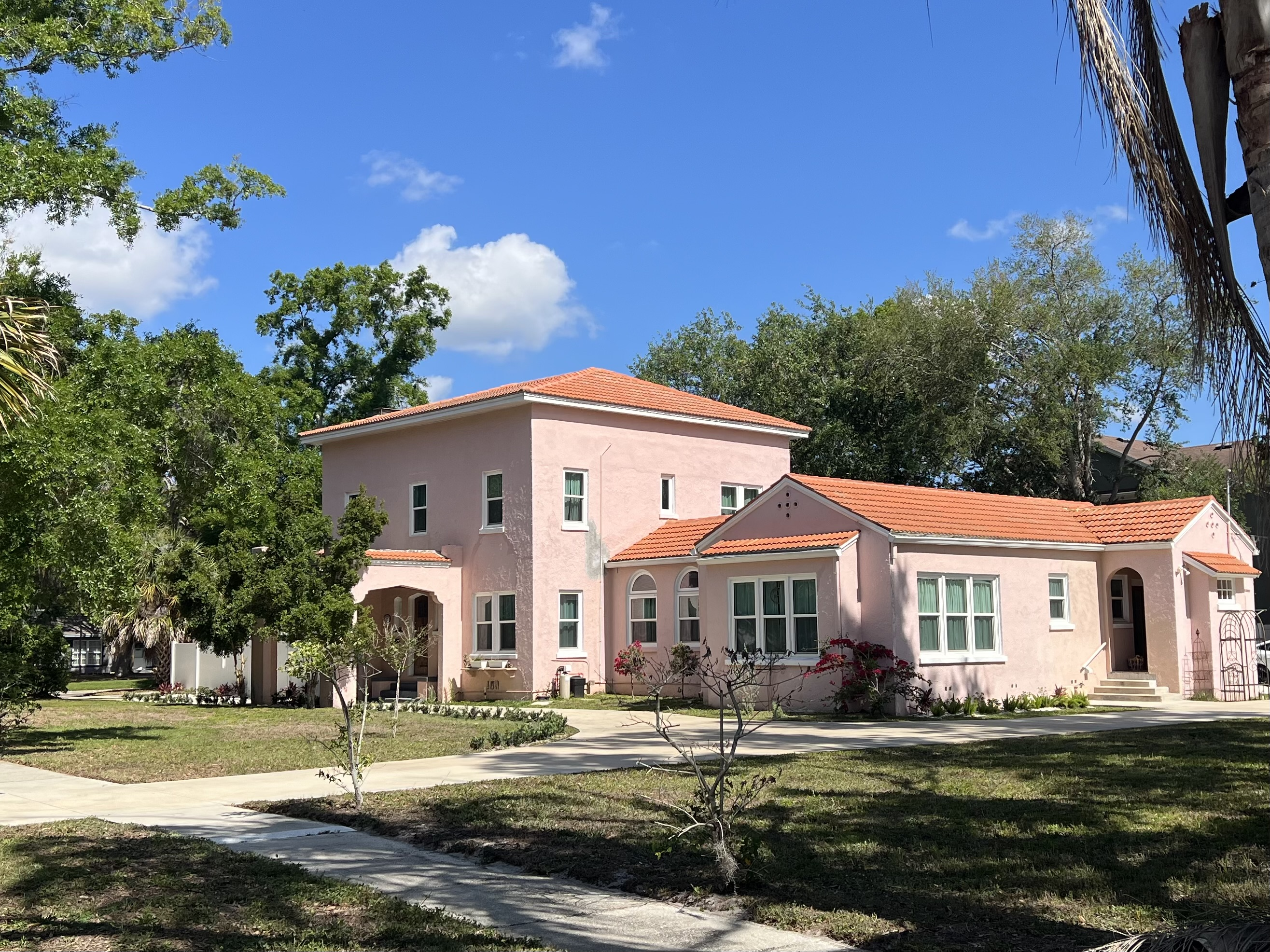
Former residence of Katherine M. Anderson (c. 1924)
