= Burdge =

Burdge is a surname. Notable people with the surname include:

- Julia R. Burdge, American chemistry professor and author
- Lindsay Burdge (born 1984), American actress and producer
- Richard Burdge (1833–1916), American politician

== See also ==
- Burge
