= Oldsmar Public Library =

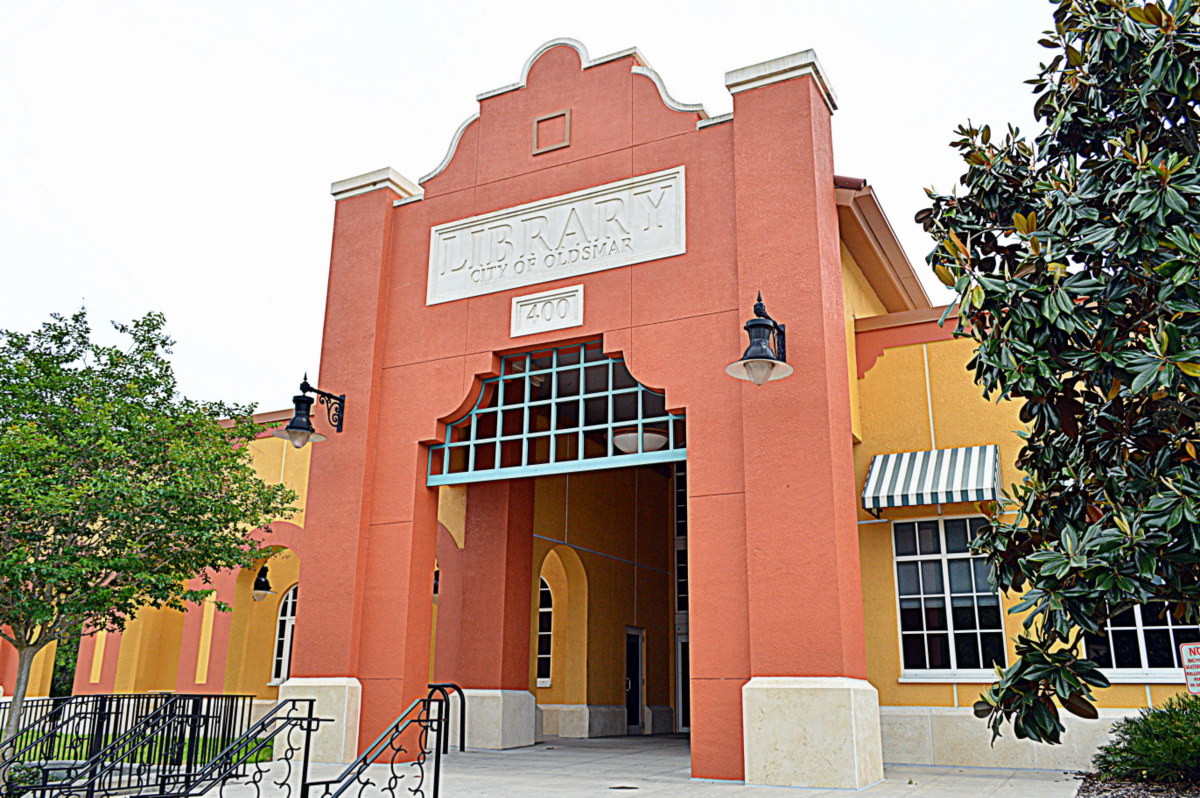
- Oldsmar Public Library
- 28.033939863249426°N 82.6598068350957°W
- Location: Oldsmar, Florida, United States
- Type: Public library

Other information
- Website: https://www.oldsmarlibrary.org/

The Oldsmar Public Library is a public library in Oldsmar, Florida. It is located at 400 St. Petersburg Dr. East in the city of Oldsmar. The library is a member of the Pinellas Public Library Cooperative. This library moved to the approximately 20,000 sq ft facility in early 2008. The current hours of operation are 9:00am to 8:00pm, Monday through Thursday, and 9:00am to 5:00pm on Fridays and Saturdays.

== History ==
In 1913, the inventor of the Oldsmobile and REO Cars, Ransom Eli Olds purchased 37,541 acres in Tampa Bay. Originally named R.E. Olds-On-the-Bay, it is now known as the City Oldsmar. It is located in Pinellas County and is at the boundary of Hillsborough County.

The Oldsmar Public Library was started by the Woman's Club where unofficial libraries were usually in someone's home. In 1919 Ransom Olds donated a small farm house to the Woman's Club where they can establish the first library. It is located in 207 Exeter Street and after a hundred years, it is still the headquarters on the Oldsmar Woman's Club. In 1920, through their tireless efforts and fundraising, they were able to buy more books and shelving.

In the early 1970s Orchid Rogers ran the Library and opened it to the public on Mondays and Wednesdays for a couple of hours each day. She fought to keep the Library operational by sitting in City Council Meetings and securing funding. She is still active at the Oldsmar Public Library today and teaches weekly beginner Spanish language class.

In 1982, a volunteer named Estelle Riley, aka “Spike”, arranged for 10,000 books to be moved from the Annex to the State Street Center. In 1986, she became the first paid part-time Librarian.

The Oldsmar Public Library was previously housed in the Historic Oldsmar Bank Building located at 101 State Street west in Oldsmar from 1991 until the new building on St. Petersburg Drive was constructed in 2007. The library opened on January 2, 2008, with its opening ceremony being held on January 26, 2008.

The Oldsmar Public Library celebrated its Centennial on January 26, 2019.
