= Walid Abukhaled =

Arabian businessman

- وليد بن عبدالمجيد أبوخالد
- Born: 1966 (age 59–60); Saudi Arabia
- Occupation: CEO

Walid Abdulmajid Abukhaled is the CEO of Saudi Arabian Military Industries (SAMI) and the former Chief Executive of the global defense and aerospace corporation Northrop Grumman in the Middle East. He is a board member of Dussur.

== Career ==
Abukhaled is from Saudi Arabia. He resides in Riyadh, Saudi Arabia. He holds a Bachelor's degree in industrial and management systems engineering from the University of South Florida.

He is the a board director of the DUSSUR Company, the Vice Chairman of the Board Northrop Grumman Mission Systems Arabia, and a member of Northrop Grumman Council for Diversity & Inclusion.

== Awards ==
- Arabian Business Achievement KSA Awards - 2015
- Entrepreneur of the year award “ Enterprise Agility – Thought Leadership 2018” Entrepreneur Middle East
