= Robert Burge =

Australia international rugby union player (1905-??)

- Born: Robert Burge; 20 September 1905 Inverell, New South Wales

Rugby union career
- Position: Centre
International career
Years	Team	Apps	(Points)
1928	Wallabies	4	(0)

Robert Burge (born 20 September 1905) was a rugby union player who represented Australia.

Burge, a centre, was born in Inverell, New South Wales and claimed a total of 4 international rugby caps for Australia.
