= Dussur =

Saudi government company

- Company type: Investment
- Industry: Automotive Downstream Chemicals Industrial Metals
- Founded: 2014; 12 years ago
- Headquarters: Riyadh, Saudi Arabia
- Key people: Raed Al-Rayes (CEO); Mohammed A. Abunayyan (Chairman); Ammr Kurdi (Chief Corporate Services Officer)
- Website: www.dussur.com

Dussur is a Saudi government company established in 2014 at Saudi Arabia for the development of strategic industrial investments. As of April 2019, its CEO is Raed Al-Rayes. Its shareholders include Public Investment Fund, Saudi Aramco, and SABIC.

"Dussur" translates to ropes in Arabic.

== See also ==
- List of companies of Saudi Arabia
- Saudi Aramco
