= Gerard Burge =

English cricketer

Gerard Rodon Burge (9 August 1857 – 15 February 1933) was an English first-class cricketer, active 1885–86. He played for Middlesex, as a medium-pace bowler, and took five wickets for 58 on his first appearance. Assisting Gentlemen of Sussex v, and Gentlemen of Philadelphia at Hove in 1889, he performed the hat trick. He also played a little for M.C.C., Hertfordshire and Bedfordshire.

Gerard was born in Dinapore, India, and he schooled at the Marlborough College XI; He died in Edmonton, Middlesex.
