= Ronald Burge =

Welsh physicist (1932–2022)

Ronald Edgar Burge (3 October 1932 – 28 May 2022) was a Welsh physicist and academic, who was a professor of physics at King's College London, where he was Wheatstone Professor of Physics from 1989 to 2000.

== Early life ==
Burge attended Canton High School, a boys' grammar school, in Cardiff and King's College London (BSc, Physics; PhD).

== Career ==
Burge joined King's College London in 1954 at the age of 21. His work looked at the structure of fibrous proteins. He was Head of the Department of Physics at King's College London from October 1984 to 1992.

== Personal life and death ==
Burge married in 1953 and had two sons. He died on 28 May 2022, aged 89.

Academic offices
Preceded by Michael Hart	Wheatstone Professor of Physics; 1989 – 2000	Succeeded by
