= Bourgue =

Bourgue is a French surname. Notable people with the surname include:

- Mathias Bourgue (born 1994), French tennis player
- Maurice Bourgue (1939–2023), French oboist, composer, and conductor
