= Penticton Vees =

Penticton Vees may refer to:

- Penticton Vees (BCHL)
- Penticton Vees (senior)
- Penticton Vees (WHL)
