= Pery Burge =

English artist (1955–2013)

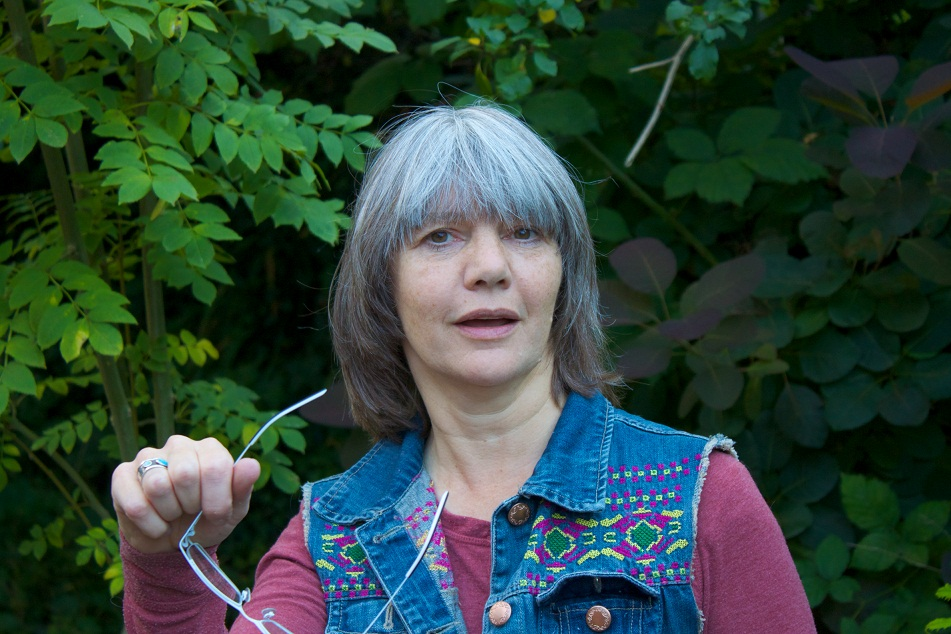
- Pery Burge
- Born: Peronel Burge; 1955; Launceston, Cornwall, England
- Died: 10 February 2013 (aged 57–58)
- Website: Pery Burge Website

Pery Burge (1955 – 10 February 2013) was an English artist who, during the 2000s, worked with abstract images using ink in water or ink on paper, invoking natural processes such as surface tension driven flow, gravity, turbulence, rotation and erosion.

== Biography ==
Born Peronel Burge, she grew up in Launceston, Cornwall. Pery's first main interest was music, she played the piano and violin. During this time period she was also involved with scientific experiments with direction from her father. Burge developed an interest in art during her early teenage years, and was inspired by a book her mother had given her called You Are An Artist by Fred Gettings (1965). In 1972 she attended various schools before she obtained a music and art teaching certificate from Gipsy Hill College, Kingston. She continued her education at the Gipsy Hill College, Kingston to complete a Bachelor of Arts degree. Gipsy Hill College merged with Kingston University in 1992.

In 1992, she had developed RSI, which she had to modify her artistic practices to continue with Art. Pery Burge continued her education in Graphic Arts and Illustration at Anglia Polytechnic University and obtained a Certificate of Higher Education Pass in 1994.

In 2006, Pery Burge developed a new brushless art technique, which lead to experimenting with moving substrate. Burge found that ink in water, when using different surface tension, gave a colourful flow and movement, which she calls "Inkplosions".* Once this technique was mastered, Pery began photographing the sequences of the changing flow. Thus creating colour variations that could be controlled by the surface tension. She presented her work at the 12th International Symposium for Flow Visualization(ISFV12) Göttingen, Germany, 2006.

2007–2009, she prepared work for publication in Leonardo and Journal of Visualization. Burge has worked on new ways of bringing art and science together for students, when she started her Artist-in Residence at Exeter University Thermofluids Lab, funded by the Leverhume Trust.

2010–2011, Pery started to produce videos of ink in water using her "Inkplosions" techniques.

Through 2012, Pery Burge worked with glass and light, naming this imagery "Lightscapes", using a method to bend light as it travels through glass creating patterns. In December 2012, Pery was diagnosed with cancer and died on 10 February 2013.

== Artworks ==
April 2012, Pery Burge and Tullio DeSantis have collaborated on multimedia projects that involved narrative readings, music by Tullio and visual fluid imagery created by Pery Burge.

== Exhibitions ==
Year	Exhibitions
1992–1999	Solo Exhibition, "Chronoscapes: Painting with Time"; Brushless Painting.: Drill Hall Arts Centre, Chenies St, London, Courtyard Arts, Herford, West Dean College, Chichester, Radlett Centre, Herts; Merlin Art Gallery, Sheffield.
2000	Group exhibition located in London and Exeter: Air Gallery, Dover St, London Taylor Jardine Open; South West Academy of Arts Open, Exeter Phoenix; National Society Open, Whiteley's, Queenway, London
2006	12th International Symposium for Flow Visualization Göttingen, Germany: South Gate Gallery, Exeter "Contemporary Reflections"; National Society Open, Jersey Galleries, London; National Society Annual Open, Whiteley's London; Exeter Phoenix South West Contemporary Art Fair
2 July 2012	Liquid, Light and Time held at Exeter University Innovation Centre Different media reveal connections that illuminate the development of pattern, and time-based sequences join the dots between different stages of evolution.
October 2012	Exhibition in the Forum
