= Dee Shapiro =

American artist

- Born: Brooklyn, New York
- Movement: Pattern and Decoration
- Website: www.deeshapiro.com

Dee Shapiro is an American artist and writer associated with the Pattern and Decoration movement.

== Biography ==
Dee Shapiro was inspired to be an artist in her early years of education. Dee's career started in the 1970s as a pattern painter with her works of art included in the Pattern and Decoration at P.S. 1 in 1977. She researched and explored the Fibonacci Progression in color on graph paper and also explored geometric complexity of architectural designs, leading her to create the small horizontal oil paintings of cities and landscapes. Dee Shapiro became a Yaddo fellow in 2017.

== Education and career ==
Dee Shapiro obtained her bachelor's degree in 1958 and Master of Science in 1960 from Queens College, City University of New York. Dee Shapiro is an artist that sees the subject on a large scale, but what she creates is on a diminutive scale. Shapiro's strength is the ability to give expressive power on canvas that makes her work seem larger than they are. Dee Shapiro has been a teacher, lecturer, and writer through career.

== Group exhibitions ==
- 2018 The American Dream, Emden, Germany
- 2018 “Systemic Pattern Painting” David Richard Gallery, NYC
- 2019 With Pleasure, Pattern and Decoration in American Art, 1972-1985, LAMOCA 2019, Hessel Museum, Bard College, Annandale on Hudson, NY
- 2020 “My Corona: Ro2 Gallery, Dallas TX
- 2020 “Unfinished Business." Bernay Fine Art, Great Barrington, MA
- 2021. "11 Women of Spirit,” Zurcher Gallery, NYC

== Solo exhibitions ==
- 2016 Art 101, Brooklyn, NY
- 2015 Andre Zarre Gallery, NYC
- 2015 Five Points Gallery, Torrington, CT
- 2012, 2010, 2009 Andre Zarre Gallery, NYC
- 2010 Norfolk Library, Norfolk, CT
- 2009 George Billis Gallery
- 2006 Harrison Street Gallery, Frenchtown, NJ
- 2004 The Mercy Gallery. Loomis Chafee, Windsor, CT.
- 2004, 2002, 1998 Andre Zarre Gallery, NY C, National Arts Club, NYC
- 2000 Principle Gallery, Alexandria, VA
- 1998 Nassau County Museum of Fine Art, Roslyn, NY
- 1997 Andre Zarre Gallery, NYC
- 1996 North Winds, Port Washington, NY
- 1994, 1991,1988,1985 Andre Zarre Gallery, NYC
- 1984 Ana Sklar Gallery, Miami, FL
- 1983 Andre Zarre Gallery, NYC
- 1982 Everson Museum, Syracuse, NY, Andre Zarre Gallery, NYC
- 1981 Dubins Gallery, Los Angeles, CA, Zenith Gallery, Pittsburgh, PA
- 1980, 1976 Andre Zarre Gallery, NYC
- 1979 Gallery 700, Milwaukee, WI, Andre Zarre Gallery, NYC
- 1978 St. Mary's College, Notre Dame, IN
- 1977 University of Arkansas at Little Rock, Little Rock, AR
- 1975,1973 Central Hall Gallery, Port Washington, NY, Nassau County Museum of Fine Art, Roslyn, NY

== Selected bibliography ==
- James Panero, Supreme Fiction The Hudson River School Revisited, March, 2010
- Piri Halaz, From the Mayor’s Doorstep, April 2010
- Steve Starger, Art New England, Dee Shapiro: “On The Horizontal,” Feb/Mar 2005
- Maureen Mullarkey, The New York Sun,”The Last Time I Saw Cuba,” April 15, 2004
- James Kalm, NY ARTS, International Edition, April 2000
- Helen Harrison, The New York Times, April 12, 1998, April 11, 1981
- Phyllis Braff, The New York Times, 1989
- Charlotte Rubenstein, American Women Artists, Avon, 1982
- Barbara Colin, "Pattern of a Painter" New York Arts Journal, Oct-Nov 1981
- Helen Harrison, Harald Szeeman, "Pattern Paintings" D U Die Kunstzeitschrift, Zurich, June 1979
- Ellen Lubell, "Lush Complexities and Visual Indulgence" SoHo Weekly News, Feb.13, 1979
- Peter Frank, The Village Voice, May 1, 1979
- Judith Tannenbaum, Arts Magazine, April 1978
- Peter Frank, "Pattern Painting" ARTnews, Feb. 1978
- Madeline Burnside, ARTnews, April 1978
- April Kingsley, "Opulent Optimism" The Village Voice, Nov. 28, 1977
- John Canaday, "Talent Blooms" The New York Times, May 9, 1976
- Malcolm Preston, Newsday, September 18, 1976
- Gordon Brown, Arts Magazine, September 1976
- Ellen Lubell, "Watercolor Electricity" SoHo Weekly News, Feb.16,1975

== Selected collections ==
- A.G. Rosen Collections
- Albright College Collection, Reading, PA
- Albright-Knox Museum, Buffalo, NY
- Aldrich Museum of Contemporary Art, Ridgefield, CT
- Birmingham Museum of Art, Birmingham, AL
- Brown-Foreman, Louisville, KY
- Chrysler Museum, Norfolk, VA
- Citibank Collection, NYC
- Dartmouth Museum of Art, Hanover, NH
- Dayton Institute, Dayton, OH
- Owens-Corning Corp., Corning, NY
- Everson Museum of Art, Syracuse, NY
- General Electric Co., Fairfield, Ct.
- Solomon R. Guggenheim Museum, NYC
- Corporate Collection, Jeddah, Saudi Arabia
- Heckscher Museum of Art, Huntington, New York
- Herbert F. Johnson Museum, Ithaca NY
- Hoffman-LaRoche Collection, Zurich, Switzerland
- IBM Corporation, NY
- Lehigh University Collection, Bethlehem, PA
- Louis-Dreyfus Financial Group
- Mercer Street Medical Center, NYC
- Mint Museum of Art, Charlotte, NC
- Neuberger Museum, Purchase, NY
- New York University Collection, NYC
- Pepsico Corporation, NY
- Spencer Museum of Art, Lawrence, KS
- St. Mary’s College Collection, Notre Dame, IN
- Texaco Corporation, NY
- The New Museum, NYC
- New York University Collection, NYC
- The Newark Museum, Newark, NJ
- United States Department of State, Washington, DC
- University of Arkansas at Little Rock, Little Rock, AR
