= List of Dude, That's My Ghost! characters =

This is a list of characters for the animated television series, Dude, That's My Ghost!.

== Main ==
=== Spencer Wright ===
Spencer Wright (voiced by Olivier Podesta in French and Rasmus Hardiker in English) is a 14-year-old boy and the main protagonist of the series. He is a budding filmmaker and makes his own amateur movies on a regular basis. He aspires to be a famous film director. Spencer is a particular fan of horror-and-gore films, with nearly all of his own homemade movies having to do with either zombies, serial killers, demons, or monsters in some way. Spencer wears a blue guitar pick necklace that used to belong to Billy in order to see him. Because he is fairly new to Beverly Heights and is very different from the norm (in that he isn't wealthy, trendy, or the "Hollywood type") he has garnered a number of enemies at his school whom he clashes with (Principal Ponzi, Lolo, and Kleet), although he receives help dealing with them from Billy and is actually able to fit in with other people. Likewise, Spencer helps Billy by protecting him from his enemies, like Madame X and Hoover. He also normally has to help solve problems caused by Billy as well, mostly pertaining to the effects of his ectoplasm and/or general antics.

=== Billy Joe Cobra ===
Billy Joe Cobra (voiced by Christophe Lemoine in French and Darren Foreman in English) is a fun-loving, mischievous, energetic, funny, hyperactive, and crazy ghost and Spencer's best friend, as well as his distant relative/cousin. Before he died, he was an enormously famous pop star, and is still very popular posthumously. He cannot be seen or heard by others unless they are wearing a personal item that belonged to him before he died (such as Spencer's necklace). Billy's personality consists of both a bro-centric best friend and a stereotypical narcissistic celebrity. He tries to help Spencer with his movies and fit in more with life in Hollywood, although normally, many of his efforts usually cause more problems.

He often describes his days as a rock star, in which it is shown that he was extremely difficult to work with (showing up to a video shoot 2 days late and refusing to perform because he didn't like the camera man's jeans), loved to trash hotel rooms and wreck music video shoots, and treated his crew and staff horribly. He can also be somewhat temperamental, especially when someone insults him or his music. Nearly every one of Billy's songs involve him singing about how much he loves himself or how much everyone else loves him ("I'm Still in Love with Me", "I Am the Sunshine of My Life", "You Love Me, I Love Me More", etc.) although sometimes they are about things related to stereotypically extravagant lifestyles ("Big Yachts and Money"). Billy is extremely wealthy: possessing a custom limo, several private jets, planes, and yachts, a pet crocodile, and the large mansion that Spencer's family now live in. Billy's ghost body allows him to phase through objects and people, stretch his limbs, and transform into various things. He also has a number of powers, including the ability to possess people, instantly travel through computers and televisions, and telekinesis. Billy's most frequently-referred-to power (although one he has very limited control over) is the ectoplasm that his body is able to secrete. It is a blue, gooey substance that mutates or changes whatever it touches. Its effects are very erratic and unpredictable; it has the capability to mutate a small fish into a deadly piranha, give a video game sentience, and grant someone the abilities of a ghost. Its effects, however, can normally be reversed.

Billy regularly incorporates puns with the word "bro" into his vocabulary: (broaster oven, broham sandwich, George Bromero, Brohann Sebastian Bach, etc.) He does not share Spencer's love of horror films, despite being a ghost; and is acrophobic, despite having the ability to fly. He also loves smooth peanut butter, but hates chunky. He is a distant cousin to the Wright family. His real name is revealed to be Baruch Cohen in the episode "School of Terror".

== Secondary ==
=== Rajeev Baguiati ===
Rajeev Baguiati (voiced by Alexandre Nguyen in French and Rasmus Hardiker in English) is Spencer's friend. He is a goofy teenager and self-proclaimed ladies man and party animal. He is also Shanilla's brother. He is very clumsy, socially inept, and can be a rather bad friend at times (especially when he is chasing after Lolo). He is normally cast as the lead in all of Spencer's movies, despite being a rather lackluster actor. He wears a red-buckled belt that used to belong to Billy in order to see him. He has a very public crush on Lolo and is relentless in his pursuit of her affections, despite her constant rejections and proclaimed hatred of him.

=== Shanila Baguiati ===
Shanila Baguiati (voiced by Nathalie Bienaimé in French and Larissa Murray in English) is Spencer's friend and Rajeev's twin sister. She is much more level-headed than her brother and is often the voice of common sense between the two. She wears a pink bracelet that used to belong to Billy in order to see him. She also has a secret crush on Spencer.

=== Hugh Wright ===
Hugh Wright (voiced by Stéphane Ronchewski in French and Ewan Bailey in English) is Spencer's dad. He works as an accountant but has a passion for inventing and tinkering with things. However, he is terrible with technology (especially computers).

=== Jane Wright ===
Jane Wright is Spencer's mom. She is normally more level-headed than Hugh. She also loves to style hair and attends beauty school. Billy Joe Cobra's distant-cousin relationship to the Wrights has been implied to come from her side of the family.

=== Jessica Wright ===
Jessica Wright (voiced by Nathalie Bienaimé in French and Teresa Gallagher in English) is Spencer's 11-year-old sister. She is very athletic and even has a black belt in karate (which appears to be her favorite sport). She can be a bit obnoxious at times, and believes her brother is very weird for "talking to himself".

=== Mallory Merriman ===
Mallory Merriman (voiced by Teresa Gallagher) is a pretty, popular girl who is extremely nice and friendly to everyone, including Spencer, Rajeev, and Shanila.

== Villains ==
=== Madame X ===
Madame X (voiced by Nathalie Bienaimé in French and Larissa Murray in English) is a mysterious woman who is an extremely obsessed fan of Billy Joe Cobra. She has an enormous collection of BJC merchandise, pictures, and memorabilia, and makes it her mission to capture Billy and keep him in a jar, in order to complete her collection. She and Hoover appear to be the only other people (apart from Spencer and his friends) who are aware of Billy's existence and know how to see him. The upper portion of her face is always kept off-screen.

=== Sam Hoover ===
Sam Hoover (voiced by Michel Mella in French and Steven Kynman in English) is a very short, bumbling ghost-catcher and Madame X's right-hand man. He frequently attempts to capture Billy with his ghost containment unit (usually through numerous disguises or tricks), but is never able to hold onto him for long—usually due to his own incompetence. Hoover wears a pair of underwear that used to belong to Billy in order to see him. His base of operations is a van that is normally parked outside Billy's mansion.

=== Glenn Ponzi ===
Glenn Ponzi (voiced by Michel Mella in French and Ewan Bailey in English) is the principal of Beverly Beverly High School. He is a strict and bitter man who hates Spencer (believing him to be "weird" and a delinquent) and regularly attempts to get him kicked out of school. In addition to this, he is also a big detractor of Billy's music, making him a frequent target of Spencer and Billy's pranks. He can normally be seen with his pet bird Lorenzo. He also has a crush on Spencer's teacher, Ms. Rumsfeld, although these feelings are not reciprocated.

=== Lolo Calorie ===
Lolo Calorie (voiced by Nathalie Bienaimé in French and Teresa Gallagher in English) is a rich, spoiled, popular girl with a stereotypical valley girl accent. She doesn't like Spencer or his friends, as they usually stand up to her conceited and 'popular' attitude or just plain annoy her (mostly via Spencer's horror movies, Rajeev's flirting or Mallory's friendliness). In "True Party", it is shown that she might actually like Rajeev, despite being mean to him and rejecting him all the time.

=== Kleet Kleenerson ===
Kleet Kleenerson (Darren Foreman) is a jock who enjoys bullying Spencer and anyone else smaller than himself. He is a star football and basketball player at school and is very physically fit, but has the intelligence of a stereotypical jock and is normally outwitted by Spencer and Billy.

== Recurring ==
=== Adrian ===
Adrian is Lolo's silent bodyguard and assistant who caters to her every whim. He usually ends up getting rid of Rajeev for her.

=== Buck ===
Buck (voiced by Steven Kynman) is the owner of the Wi Fri. He seems to be friends with Spencer.

=== Buddy ===
Buddy (voiced by Steven Kynman) is a somewhat popular Southern-accented student. He appears to be an aspiring stuntman and makes frequent use of a giant cannon which he uses to launch himself out of.

=== The Delivery Guy ===
The Delivery Guy is a goofy delivery guy that normally ends up on the receiving end of Spencer and Billy's antics.

=== Greg Slick ===
Greg Slick is a local celebrity and entertainment show host who reports on big pop culture-related news in Hollywood.

=== iStevie ===
iStevie is a short, nerdy-looking student who is into high-tech gadgetry. He communicates purely through beatboxing, which everyone else is somehow able to understand.

=== Kath Katherson ===
Kath Katherson (voiced by Teresa Gallagher) is a newscaster who frequently reports on events happening in Beverly Heights.

=== Lorenzo ===
Lorenzo is Principal Ponzi's pet bird and companion. He even wears a mini-toupée and pair of glasses identical to Ponzi's.

=== Miss Rumsfeld ===
Miss Rusmfeld is Spencer's homeroom teacher. She appears to have been teaching for a very long time, as Principal Ponzi has admitted to being a former student of hers. She does not reciprocate his crush on her.

=== The Soapies ===
The Soapies are three popular girls—Doreen, Maureen, and Florine—who often hang out with Lolo. Their clique's nickname suggests they merely do this for popularity status.
