= Todd Krygier =

American ice hockey player (born 1965)

- Born: October 12, 1965 (age 60) Chicago Heights, Illinois, U.S.
- Height: 5 ft 11 in (180 cm)
- Weight: 180 lb (82 kg; 12 st 12 lb)
- Position: Left wing
- Shot: Left
- Played for: Hartford Whalers; Washington Capitals; Mighty Ducks of Anaheim
- National team: United States
- NHL draft: 1988 NHL Supplemental Draft; Hartford Whalers
- Playing career: 1988–2000

Todd Andrew Krygier (born October 12, 1965) is an American former professional ice hockey player. He played in the National Hockey League (NHL) for the Hartford Whalers, Washington Capitals, and Mighty Ducks of Anaheim between 1989 and 1997. Internationally Krygier played for the American national team at three World Championships. After finishing his playing career Krygier turned to coaching, and since 2019 has been an assistant coach for the Grand Rapids Griffins of the American Hockey League

== Playing career ==
After playing for the University of Connecticut, Krygier was selected by the Hartford Whalers in the 1988 NHL Supplemental Draft. He played parts of two seasons with the Whalers before being traded to the Washington Capitals in 1991. In 1994, he was traded to the Mighty Ducks of Anaheim.

Krygier played a season and a half in Anaheim before he was re-acquired by the Capitals during the 1995–96 NHL season. It was during his second tour with the Capitals that helped guide the Capitals to their first ever appearance in the Stanley Cup Final in 1998. Krygier played two seasons with the Orlando Solar Bears of the International Hockey League before retiring from active play. In 543 NHL games, Krygier scored 100 goals and 143 assists.

Krygier was previously the head coach of the Compuware AAA mite hockey team, as well as the head hockey coach at Novi High School where he won the school's first and only State Title in 2011. In June 2013, Krygier was announced as the new coach of the Muskegon Lumberjacks United States Hockey League team until he was released in July 2016. He is now an assistant coach with the Western Michigan Broncos men's ice hockey team.

== Personal life ==
Krygier is now a State Farm Insurance Agent in Northville, MI. He has five children, all of whom are athletes: daughters Natalie, who played soccer at the University of Iowa and Grace, who currently plays soccer at the University of Wisconsin–Madison, and sons Brock, who played hockey at Michigan State and Arizona State, and twins Christian and Cole, who both play at Michigan State. Christian and Cole were both selected five picks apart in the 2018 NHL entry draft by the New York Islanders and Florida Panthers respectively.

== Career statistics ==
=== Regular season and playoffs ===
			Regular season					Playoffs
Season	Team	League	GP	G	A	Pts	PIM	GP	G	A	Pts	PIM
1983–84	Buffalo Regals	Midget	—	—	—	—	—	—	—	—	—	—
1983–84	RIT	NCAA-III	—	—	—	—	—	—	—	—	—	—
1984–85	University of Connecticut	NCAA-III	14	14	11	25	12	—	—	—	—	—
1985–86	University of Connecticut	NCAA-III	32	29	27	56	46	—	—	—	—	—
1986–87	University of Connecticut	NCAA-III	28	24	24	48	44	—	—	—	—	—
1987–88	University of Connecticut	NCAA-III	27	32	39	71	28	—	—	—	—	—
1987–88	New Haven Nighthawks	AHL	13	1	5	6	34	—	—	—	—	—
1988–89	Binghamton Whalers	AHL	76	26	42	68	77	—	—	—	—	—
1989–90	Hartford Whalers	NHL	58	18	12	30	52	7	2	1	3	4
1989–90	Binghamton Whalers	AHL	12	1	9	10	16	—	—	—	—	—
1990–91	Hartford Whalers	NHL	72	13	17	30	95	6	0	2	2	0
1991–92	Washington Capitals	NHL	67	13	17	30	107	5	2	1	3	4
1992–93	Washington Capitals	NHL	77	11	12	33	60	6	1	1	2	4
1993–94	Washington Capitals	NHL	66	12	18	30	60	5	2	0	2	10
1994–95	Mighty Ducks of Anaheim	NHL	35	11	11	22	10	—	—	—	—	—
1995–96	Mighty Ducks of Anaheim	NHL	60	9	28	37	70	—	—	—	—	—
1995–96	Washington Capitals	NHL	16	6	5	11	12	6	2	0	2	12
1996–97	Washington Capitals	NHL	47	5	11	16	37	—	—	—	—	—
1997–98	Washington Capitals	NHL	45	2	12	14	30	13	1	2	3	6
1997–98	Portland Pirates	AHL	6	3	4	7	6	—	—	—	—	—
1998–99	Orlando Solar Bears	IHL	65	19	40	59	82	17	9	10	19	16
1999–00	Orlando Solar Bears	IHL	28	7	13	20	12	6	2	1	3	2
NHL totals			543	100	143	243	533	48	10	7	17	40

=== International ===
Year	Team	Event	GP	G	A	Pts	PIM
1991	United States	WC	10	4	4	8	12
1992	United States	WC	1	0	0	0	2
1997	United States	WC	8	1	1	2	6
Senior totals			19	5	5	10	20
