= Thea Tlsty =

American pathologist

Thea D Tlsty
- Education: University of South Florida (BS); Washington University in St. Louis (PhD)
- Known for: Breast cancer research
- Scientific career
- Workplaces: University of California, San Francisco; Stanford University

Thea D. Tlsty is an American pathologist and professor of pathology at the University of California, San Francisco (UCSF). She is known for her research in cancer biology and her involvement in the discovery of cells that may be at the origin of metaplastic cancer, an invasive form of breast cancer.

== Education ==
Tlsty earned her bachelor's degree in zoology from the University of South Florida, Tampa in 1973. She began her doctoral studies in molecular biology at the University of North Carolina, Chapel Hill before transferring to Washington University in St. Louis, where she received her PhD in 1980.

== Career ==
Tlsty stayed at Washington University for a short postdoctoral fellowship position, until 1981. She then joined Stanford University as a postdoctoral fellow/senior research associate in the department of biological sciences. In 1985, Tlsty returned to the University of North Carolina as an Assistant/Associate Professor of Pathology at the UNC Lineberger Comprehensive Cancer Center.

Since 1994, Tlsty has been Professor of Pathology at the University of California, San Francisco (UCSF). She is Director of the Center for Translational Research in the Molecular Genetics of Cancer.

== Research ==
Tlsty led an eight-year research study, published in the Journal of the National Cancer Institute in 2010, which established a means to predict whether women with early stage breast cancer might develop more serious tumors, using "biomarkers" (biological indicators in the body) to determine cancer risk. Tlsty also led research into 'pluripotent' stem cells in breast tissue, seeking to identify if these caused tumors. This research had looked at wound cells in breast tissue, and identified 'repair cells' that could transform into a range of other cells, including neurons, bone and cartilage — with the potential therefore to also treat cancers and other diseases.

In 2015, she co-authored research into the use of 3D tissue culture models to study breast cancer cell generation and later collaborated with Adam Engler of the University of California, San Diego in developing devices to test how strongly cells attach to tumor tissue, exploring if adhesion strength could be an accurate marker of metastatic cells.

Tlsty was awarded a 2019 Cancer Research UK Grand Challenge award of £20 Million (U.S. $26 million) to support a research project in collaboration with scientists from the UK, Canada, and Israel. The project will focus on understanding how chronic inflammation contributes to cancer.
