= Gary M. Burge =

American biblical scholar and academic (born 1952)

- Born: 1952 (age 73–74); California
- Occupations: Author, professor

Academic background
- Education: King's College, Aberdeen University
- Thesis: The Anointed Community: The Holy Spirit in the Johannine Community (1987)

Academic work
- Discipline: New Testament, Theology
- Institutions: Calvin Theological Seminary
- Notable works: Whose Land? Whose Promise?: What Christians Are Not Being Told About Israel and the Palestinians
- Website: www.garyburge.org

Gary M. Burge (born 1952) is an American author and professor. He is a New Testament scholar (adjunct) at Calvin Theological Seminary in Grand Rapids, Michigan. He is also an ordained minister in the Presbyterian Church (U.S.A.)

== Early life and education ==
Gary M. Burge attended the University of California, Riverside, where he studied political science and religious studies, followed by a year at the American University of Beirut, Lebanon, where he studied at the Near East School of Theology. Following graduation from the University of California, Riverside, he earned an M.Div. degree from Fuller Theological Seminary and a Ph.D. in New Testament Studies at King's College, Aberdeen University, Scotland, working under I. Howard Marshall. His dissertation, The Anointed Community: The Holy Spirit in the Johannine Community was published in 1987.

== Professional background ==
Burge specializes in the contextual and historical background of the New Testament. His research has centered on the gospels, in particular the Fourth Gospel, about which he has published numerous books and articles. He is a regular teacher at Willow Creek Community Church in South Barrington, Illinois, and a frequent speaker at churches and conferences. After 25 years at Wheaton College he moved in 2017 to Calvin Theological Seminary in Grand Rapids, Michigan, USA. In 2023 Burge retired from Calvin and today is adjunct professor of New Testament.

He has also published on the theological implications of the Israel-Palestine conflict. His Whose Land, Whose Promise: What Christians Are Not Being Told About Israel and the Palestinians (2003, revised 2013) was his first book in this area. His second volume, Jesus and the Land: The New Testament Challenge to Holy Land Theology (2010) is a theological examination of how the New Testament interprets the land promises of the Old Testament.

Burge also provides development workshops for college and seminary faculty. This is based on his recent work on the integration of psychology with faculty career development. His work in this area can be found in his Mapping Your Academic Career. Charting the Course of a Professor's Life (2015).

== Select works ==
- Burge, Gary M. (1992). Interpreting the Fourth Gospel. Guides to New Testament exegesis. Vol. 3. Grand Rapids, MI: Baker Book House. ISBN 9780801010217. OCLC 24953658.
- ——— (1993). Who are God's People in the Middle East?. Grand Rapids, MI: Zondervan. ISBN 9780310386919. OCLC 28148105.
- ——— (1996). The Letters of John. The NIV Application Commentary. Vol. 4. Grand Rapids, MI: Zondervan Academic. ISBN 9780310486206.
- ——— (2003). Whose Land? Whose Promise?: What Christians Are Not Being Told About Israel and the Palestinians. Cleveland, OH: Pilgrim Press. ISBN 9780829815450. OCLC 51629517.
- ———; Green, Gene L.; Cohick, Lynn H. (2009). The New Testament in Antiquity: A Survey of the New Testament within Its Cultural Contexts. Grand Rapids, MI: Zondervan. ISBN 9780310244950. OCLC 71146192.
- ——— (2009). Jesus, the Middle Eastern Storyteller. Grand Rapids, MI: Zondervan Academic. ISBN 9780310280453.
- ——— (2010). John. The NIV Application Commentary. Vol. 4. Grand Rapids, MI: Zondervan Academic. ISBN 9780310497509.
- ——— (2010). Jesus and the Land: The New Testament Challenge to Holy Land Theology. Grand Rapids, MI: Baker Academic. ISBN 9780801038983. OCLC 460060236.
- ——— (2012). Jesus and the Jewish Festivals. Grand Rapids, MI: Zondervan Academic. ISBN 9780310280477.
- ——— (2013). Interpreting the Gospel of John. A Practical Guide. Grand Rapids, MI: Baker Academic. ISBN 9780801048845. OCLC 1023206674.
- ——— (2013). Whose Land? Whose Promise?: What Christians Are Not Being Told About Israel and the Palestinians (2nd revised ed.). Cleveland, OH: Pilgrim Press. ISBN 9780829819922. OCLC 864507336.
- ——— (2015). A Week in the Life of a Roman Centurion. Downers Grove, IL: InterVarsity Press. ISBN 9780830897735. OCLC 908686051.
- ——— (2015). Mapping Your Academic Career. Charting the Course of a Professor's Life. Downers Grove, IL: InterVarsity Press. ISBN 9780830898572. OCLC 908287110.
- ——— (2019). The New Testament in Seven Sentences: A Small Introduction to a Vast Topic. Introductions in Seven Sentences. Downers Grove, IL: IVP Academic. ISBN 9780830854769. - forthcoming Oct 2019
