= Ryan Equale =

American ice hockey player and coach (born 1973)

- Born: February 22, 1973 (age 53) Wilton, Connecticut, US
- Height: 6 ft 1 in (185 cm)
- Weight: 190 lb (86 kg; 13 st 8 lb)
- Position: Forward
- Shot: Right
- Played for: Odessa Jackalopes; Lake Charles Ice Pirates; Chesapeake Icebreakers; Roanoke Express; UConn Huskies
- Playing career: 1992–2000

Ryan Equale (born 22 February 1973) is an American ice hockey coach and retired player. He served as head coach of the Connecticut Whale in the Premier Hockey Federation (PHF) during the 2017–18 and 2018–19 seasons.

== Playing career ==
Equale played four years, 1992 to 1996, of NCAA Division III ice hockey with the UConn Huskies men's ice hockey program. He served as team captain and was an All-American during his time with the Huskies.

After concluding his college career, Equale went on to play four seasons of professional hockey in North American minor leagues – the ECHL and Western Professional Hockey League (WPHL).

== Coaching career ==
Equale was hired to coach the Connecticut Whale in June 2017 to replace Heather Linstad. He holds Level 4 certification from USA Hockey and previously coached boys’ and girls’ hockey in Connecticut. He was not retained for the 2019–20 season.

== Personal life ==
Equale and his wife have three children, Rocco, Leo, and Leighton.
