= Julia R. Burdge =

American chemist and author

Julia Ruth Burdge (born 1960) is an American chemistry professor and author. She became notable for using a pragmatic approach to teaching chemistry in her books, giving emphasis to the applications of chemistry rather than the theory. Burdge has won several awards and recognitions throughout the years in her career as a chemistry professor.

== Early life and education ==
Julia Burdge was born in 1960.

Burdge took most of her undergraduate studies at Iowa State University. She completed her bachelor's (1987) and master's (1990) degrees in inorganic chemistry at the University of South Florida; she obtained her Ph.D. in analytical chemistry at the University of Idaho (1994). Her master's degree research was done on “the development of chemotherapeutic analogs of cisplatin”, and her doctoral research dealt with “the development of instruments and methods for measuring ultra-trace concentrations of atmospheric sulfur compounds.”

== Career ==
Burdge currently holds an affiliate faculty position in the University of Idaho. She has taught introductory and advanced-level courses for over 20 years, and has developed a new introductory course for aspiring science teachers as well as a new faculty-development program for graduate students and post-doctoral associates.

== Publications ==
=== Chemistry: The Central Science ===
Burdge's was one of the authors of the very widely used textbook, Chemistry: The Central Science (co-written with Theodore L. Brown, Jr. H. Eugene LeMay, and Bruce Edward Bursten) The book spanned several main topics and currently has reached a published 14th edition. The most recent she has been associated with has been the 9th.

=== Chemistry ===
Burdge's most recognized work (and so far, only non co-authored book), Chemistry, incorporates a pragmatic content-driven context. Burdge attempted to answer the question: “What was the point of studying chemistry?”. The book contains a grand variety of art, diagrams, and a wide assortment of end-chapter problems.

=== Chemistry: Atoms First ===
Atoms First (published January 7, 2011, and co-written with Jason Overby) addressed using a different and an apparently more logical approach to teaching chemistry. As opposed to the way that it had been done traditionally, the textbook starts off with the atom and works its way up to the formation of chemical compounds and their properties. This method aimed at providing a sufficient background to students to allow them to fully engage in topics like Stoichiometry, Kinetics, Equilibrium, and Thermodynamics.

== Awards and designations ==
- In 1994, Burdge was assigned to assistant professor and director of the Introductory Chemistry program at the University of Akron.
- In 2000, she became associate professor at the University of Akron.
- In 2001, she was appointed the Honors College of Florida Atlantic University.
- In both 2000 and 2002 she was given the “Who’s Who Among America’s Teachers” award.
- And in 2009, she was given the “Alumni of the Year” award by the University of South Florida.
