= Mike's Weather Page =

Weather website

- Website type: Weather, blog
- Country of origin: United States
- Owner: Mike Boylan
- Website: www.spaghettimodels.com
- Launched: 2004
- Current status: Active

Mike's Weather Page is an amateur video blog and weather aggregator established in 2004.

== History ==
The website was launched in 2004 by Mike Boylan. He graduated from the University of South Florida with a degree in marketing in 1996. He joined Facebook in 2009 to establish his weather site and has since amassed millions of followers on social media, becoming a popular figure in the weather blogging realm. Boylan is well known for his live coverage of Atlantic hurricanes as a storm chaser.

The website currently displays a wide range of aggregated information related to weather and climate. Analysis and forecasts of tropical cyclogenesis can be found on the site.

For example, computer model runs and real-time satellite imagery data of tropical activity in the Atlantic basin can be accessed on the website. The site also collects maps and tropical forecasts on a national scale, as well as a global earthquake feed. The website's style is simple and relatively unchanged since the late 2000s.

== Creation ==
As a weather enthusiast, Boylan founded the website in 2004, and it has since become a popular source of meteorological information for personal, corporate, military, government, and scientific entities, due to its data aggregation style. Boylan declares in media reports and personal communication channels that his weather website is only for informational purposes and is not intended to sell tropical forecasts. Boylan's comprehension of tropical cyclogenesis is self-taught, and he describes himself as a blogger, storm chaser, and civilian weather tracker.

Boylan is married to Julie, and the couple has two daughters as well as two pets. He is a NASCAR enthusiast. The Boylan family first gained public appeal after a local news station visited their Tampa Bay home and aired a brief segment about them in the 2000s.

== Recognition ==
Boylan and his website Mike's Weather Page has been acknowledged by the National Oceanic and Atmospheric Administration, the National Weather Service, the Centers for Disease Control and Prevention, and the Federal Emergency Management Agency. It has served as a source for weather analysis by hurricane hunters, meteorologists, state emergency management entities, The Weather Channel, and government officials. Veteran meteorologist Jim Cantore once called Boylan's site a "one-stop shop for weather."

In 2021, Florida Governor Ron DeSantis honored Boylan with the Tropical Meteorology Award for his site's focus on weather coverage during Atlantic hurricane seasons.

In 2023 and 2024, the Florida Division of Emergency Management (FDEM) announced a partnership with Mike's Weather Page for the sponsorship of the No. 4 JD Motorsports car in a NASCAR Xfinity Series race. Along with the FDEM, Mike's Weather Page holds a partnership with Gulf Coast Jam, Tampa Bay Brewing Company, and FIRMAN Power Equipment.
