= Mike Boylan =

American blogger

- Born: Michael Jerome Boylan; October 17, 1973 (age 52)
- Education: University of South Florida
- Occupations: Video blogger, storm chaser
- Years active: 2004–present
- Known for: Mike's Weather Page

Michael Jerome Boylan (born October 17, 1973) is an American video blogger and storm chaser from Oldsmar, Florida.

== Background ==
Boylan graduated from East Lake High School in Tarpon Springs, Florida in 1991. In 1996, he obtained a degree in marketing from the University of South Florida.

Boylan launched his weather aggregator website in 2004 as an avid weather enthusiast. He later joined Facebook in 2009 to establish a presence for his website Mike's Weather Page. It has since become a popular site for many weather enthusiasts and meteorology professionals, amassing millions of followers on social media. Boylan is also known for his video coverages of Atlantic hurricanes as a storm chaser.

=== Awards ===
In 2021, Florida Governor Ron DeSantis honored Boylan with the Tropical Meteorology Award for his coverage of Atlantic hurricane seasons.

== Personal life ==
Boylan is married to Julie and they have two daughters, Emily and Sarah. He owns two French Bulldogs, Hunter and Louie, often used as pet mascots for his online brand. Boylan is a NASCAR enthusiast.
