= Cornbread Red =

American pool player

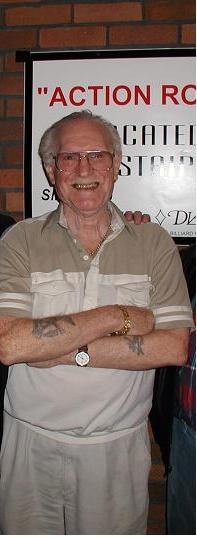
Cornbread Red at the Derby City Classic, Louisville, Kentucky, January 2003

Billy Joe "Cornbread Red" Burge (December 17, 1931 – February 13, 2004), was an American pool player. Inducted into the One-pocket Hall of Fame in 2004 and the Bank Pool Hall of Fame in 2005, Cornbread Red is revered as "one of the most talented characters in the history of pool" and considered as one of the hustlers.

== Professional Days ==
Red was born in Paducah, Kentucky to a sharecropping family during the Great Depression, which is when he acquired a passion and talent for billiards. He learned the rules of the road from notorious hustlers, gamblers, con men, and world-class pool champions.

Burge frequented Cushion Cue and Brew as well as The Rack, a popular pool room in Detroit, Michigan, in an era when gambling was considered the norm in American pool. Though he never had a job, he devoted his life to pocket billiards. He was always looking for a game, and it did not matter what game because he could play all games well but was nearly unbeatable at one-pocket and would play you at any limits.

Burge is an American legendary pool player. He is heralded by many players as being one of the greatest money players of all time. When asked how much was the most money he ever played for, he said it was a race to 6 for US$100,000.

He died at the age of 72 and will be remembered as one of the great professional billiard players. He was featured in Pool and Billiard Magazine, May 2000, in the "Legends of the Road" section.

== Filmography ==
- 1992 West Coast One-Pocket Championship, Los Angeles, California
