= HM Prison Bronzefield =

Female prison in Surrey, England

Coordinates: 51.4329°N 0.4841°W

HMP Bronzefield
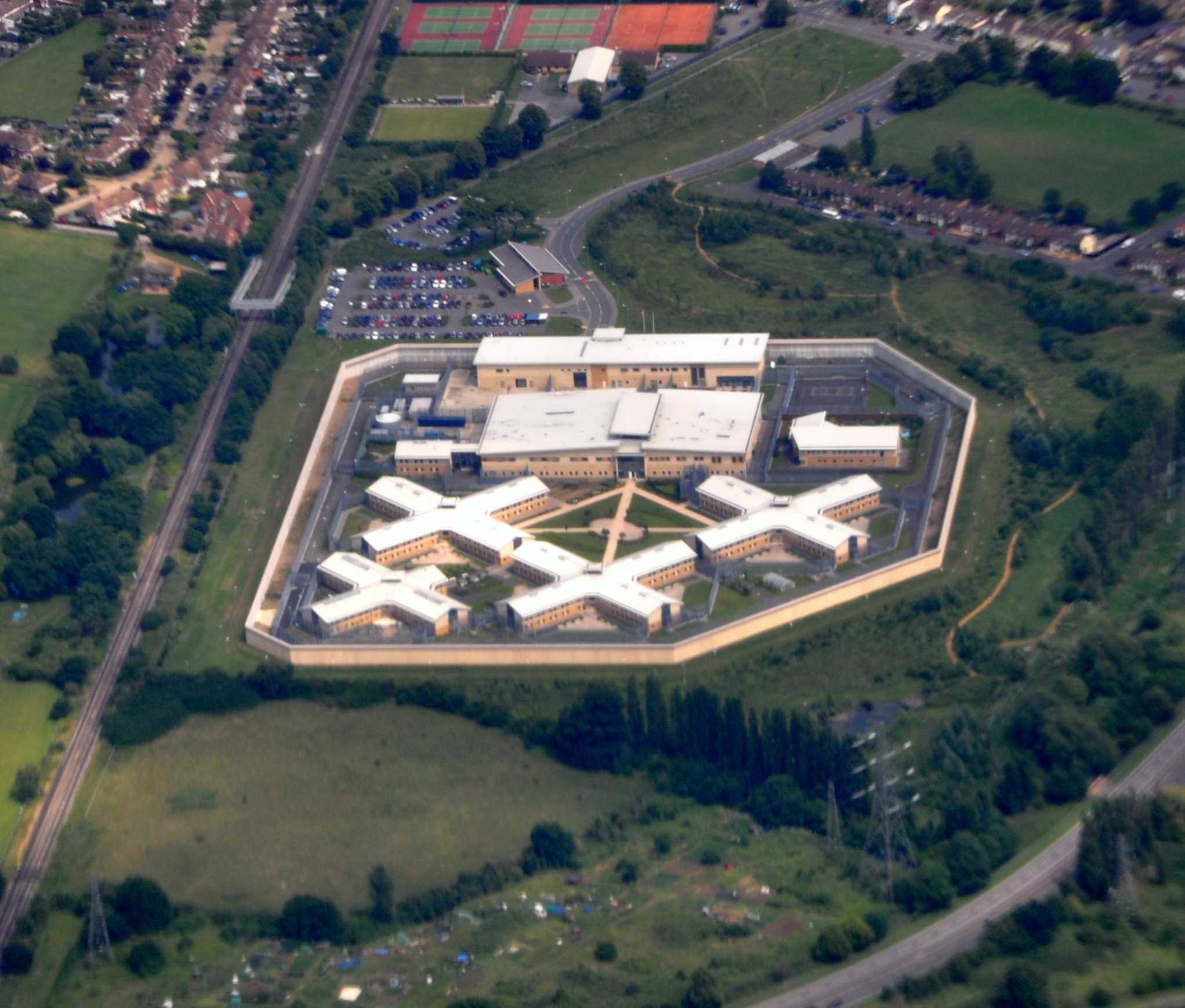
- Interactive map of HMP Bronzefield
- Location: Ashford, Surrey
- Status: Operational
- Security class: Adult Female/Young Offender
- Capacity: 527 (May 2024)
- Opened: 2004
- Managed by: Sodexo Justice Services
- Director: Charlotte Wilson

HMP Bronzefield is an adult and young offender female prison located on the outskirts of Ashford in Surrey, England. Bronzefield is the only purpose-built private prison solely for women in the UK, and is the largest female prison in Europe. The prison is operated by Sodexo Justice Services.

== History ==
The site was originally home to West London District School, a residential school opened in September 1872 for the education of orphans, which came under the control of London County Council from April 1930. In 1931 it provided residential accommodation for 640 children from the County of London, but by the time of its closure in 1955 this had dwindled to just 40. In 1961 the site was repurposed as Ashford Remand Centre, a detention facility for boys aged 14 to 21 which became notorious for its decrepit facilities and inmate violence. The remand centre was closed in 1988, but briefly reopened due to system overcrowding before its final closure in 1990, after which the buildings were demolished.

Bronzefield Prison was opened in June 2004 as the UK's new top-security prison for women.

Since its opening, Bronzefield has gained media coverage for its notable inmates, supposedly lax regime, high staff turnover and poor industrial relations.

In 2009, a 77-bed unit was built on the existing site, taking the operational capacity up to 527. Plans also exist to further expand the prison to include a male section along the lines of HMP Peterborough (also run by Sodexo Justice Services), making it a dual prison holding males and females.

In 2012, it was reported that Bronzefield was the first prison in the UK to have its own branch of the Women's Institute. The branch is for members of staff and for inmates who are taking part in resettlement programmes ahead of their release.

== The prison today ==
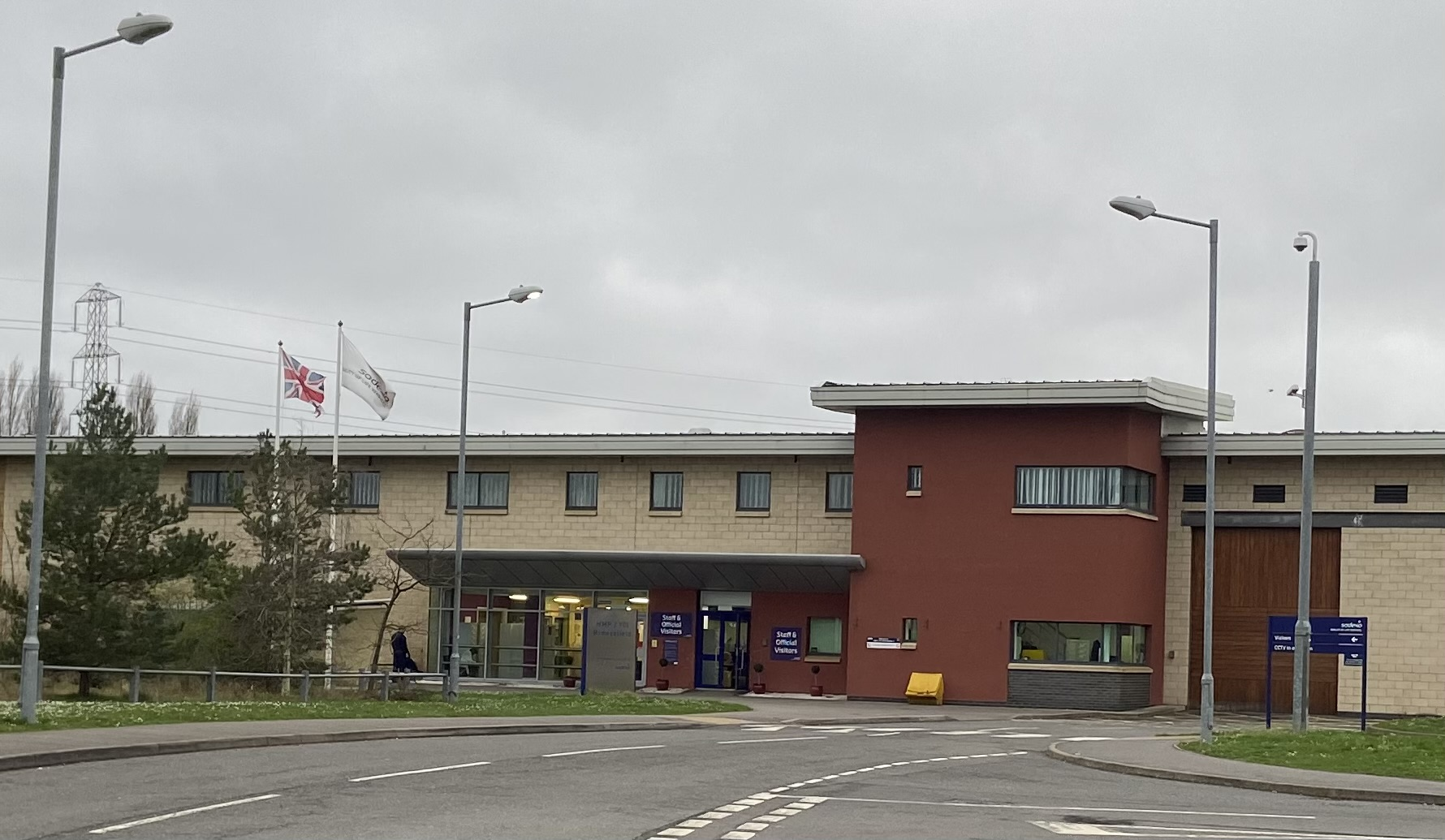
Entrance to HMP Bronzefield

HM Prison Bronzefield is currently one of three prisons to house Category A prisoners in the female estate (female and juvenile category-A prisoners are called "restricted status" prisoners), the others being HM Prison Low Newton in County Durham and HM Prison New Hall in West Yorkshire. The prison is staffed by about 140 prison custody officers, in a ratio of 50% female and 50% male officers. Bronzefield is also a local prison, taking prisoners directly from the courts. Bronzefield holds a wide range of female offenders, including remand, sentenced and restricted status women.

Accommodation at Bronzefield is divided into four main residential units, each holding approximately 135 women. The prison also has a 12-bed Mother and Baby Unit, accommodating children up to 18 months old. Bronzefield has a Level 4 Healthcare provision with in-patient facilities for 18 women, as well as a smaller 10-bed Help & Direction Unit.

Bronzefield offers full-time education courses including Art, ESOL and Information Technology. There are also workshops in Cleaning Science and Arts and Crafts.

At least four times in the two years to 2019 women gave birth in upsetting and potentially dangerous conditions: one woman gave birth in her cell and another was left in labour during the night only with support from another pregnant prisoner.

The prison is run by Sodexo; its annual report and accounts for 2017/18 show the cost per prisoner at Bronzefield is £66,294, at least £10,000 higher than any other women’s prison.

=== Deaths ===
==== Natasha Chin ====
Natasha Chin died in 2016 less than two days after she arrived at the prison after she had vomited continuously for nine hours and was not given medical attention or her prescribed medication. Prison officers asked healthcare staff to attend to Chin but healthcare staff did not respond. Chin rang her cell bell but prison staff failed to respond because they did not know bells were faulty. The inquest jury found her death was due to "a systemic failure, which led to a lack of basic care", and her death was "contributed to by neglect". Since Chin’s death, three further deaths of women found unresponsive in cells at Bronzefield have occurred. Earlier deaths and several inspection reports from at least 2010 stated long-established concerns about problems with healthcare services. Deborah Coles of INQUEST said the Minister of Justice and Sodexo should be held accountable for not acting on repeated warnings about health care not being safe.

==== New-born baby ====
In October 2019, a new-born baby died after the unnamed 18-year-old mother gave birth alone in her cell without medical supervision or help. Ten or eleven different enquiries have been launched into the baby's death. There are questions over how the woman had no medical help during birth, and the case drew attention to what is done generally for pregnant women in prison. There was previous unease over the care of pregnant prisoners at Bronzefield and the prison faced criticism for transferring prisoners to hospital only when advanced in labour.

The Prisons and Probation Ombudsman reported many failings in the way the teenager was treated. Though the prisoner pressed her bell twice and asked for a nurse, no assistance was provided. The Prisons and Probation Ombudsman, Sue McAllister said: "Ms A gave birth alone in her cell overnight without medical assistance. Overall the healthcare offered to her was not equivalent to that she could have expected in the community." Prison staff on the mother's block did not know that the birth was imminent and health agencies did not share information adequately with the prison. The mother was on remand facing a robbery charge. It was alleged she had "a troubled and traumatic childhood" and was "sad, angry and scared" after she was told the baby would be taken away at birth.

== Inspections ==
A 2013 report by the chief inspector of prisons praised the institution for its efforts to tackle alcohol problems and self-harm, improvements in health care, and its induction, first night in prison and reception facilities, since however structures in staffing and management have changed these procedures. The report condemned their segregation practices, in particular for keeping a prisoner in segregation for five years in bad conditions, treatment which "appears to amount to torture".

== Notable inmates ==
=== Current ===
- Beinash Batool – Convicted of murdering her stepdaughter, Sara Sharif.
- Marie Black – Convicted in 2015 of leading a child abuse ring.
- Rizlaine Boular
- Sharon Carr – Youngest convicted female murderer in British legal history.
- Mina Dich
- Nicola Edgington – Convicted in 2013 of murdering Sally Hodkin, a member of the public, and attempting to murder another.
- Jennifer Johnson – girlfriend of Russell Bishop at the time that he committed the Babes in the Wood Murders in Brighton in 1986, she was convicted in 2021 of perjury and perverting the course of justice after she lied about evidence in his first trial to help get him acquitted.
- Lucy Letby – Former nurse convicted of murdering seven babies and attempting to murder seven more.
- Constance Marten – Convicted of manslaughter after contributing to the death of her daughter through gross negligence.
- Jemma Mitchell – Former osteopath convicted of murdering a close friend, Mee Kuen Chong, for financial gain.
- Safiyya Shaikh

=== Former ===
- Jane Andrews – Convicted in 2001 of murdering her lover, Thomas Cressman.
- Donna Anthony – One of several women wrongfully convicted of murdering her children following inaccurate and erroneous testimony given by Roy Meadow.
- Khawla Barghouthi – Convicted in 2018 of participating in the 2016–17 all-female UK terror plot.
- Tracey Connelly – Convicted in 2008 of facilitating the abuse and contributing to the murder of her son, Peter Connelly.
- Farah Damji – convicted fraudster
- Tracy Dawber – Convicted in 2010 alongside Vanessa George of distributing child pornography and participating in sexual abuse of an infant.
- Joanna Dennehy – Convicted in 2013 alongside other accomplices of murder in connection with the Peterborough ditch murders.
- Sabina Eriksson – Convicted in 2009 of manslaughter through diminished responsibility after fatally stabbing Glenn Hollinshead, a member of the public housing her following her arrest.
- Jayda Fransen – former leader and deputy leader of far-right party Britain First
- Vanessa George – One of several convicted in relation to the 2009 Plymouth child abuse case.
- Shauna Hoare – Convicted of manslaughter in 2015 alongside her boyfriend, Nathan Matthews, for her role in the murder of Becky Watts.
- Louise Lancaster – climate change activist
- Tracy Lyons – Convicted in 2010 in connection with the 2009 Plymouth child abuse case.
- Karen Matthews – Convicted in 2008 in relation to the kidnapping of Shannon Matthews.
- Fiona Onasanya - Convicted in 2018 of perverting the course of justice following two speeding incidents in 2017.
- Rosemary West – Convicted in 1995 after conspiring with her husband, Fred West in order to sexually assault her stepdaughter and another young woman, and murder ten young women over the period of 14 years.
- Seema Misra – Wrongfully convicted in 2010 of theft and false accounting in connection with the British Post Office scandal.
- Roshonara Choudhry – sentenced to life in prison for attempting to murder MP Stephen Timms.
