= HM Prison Eastwood Park =

Closed category women's prison

HMP Eastwood Park
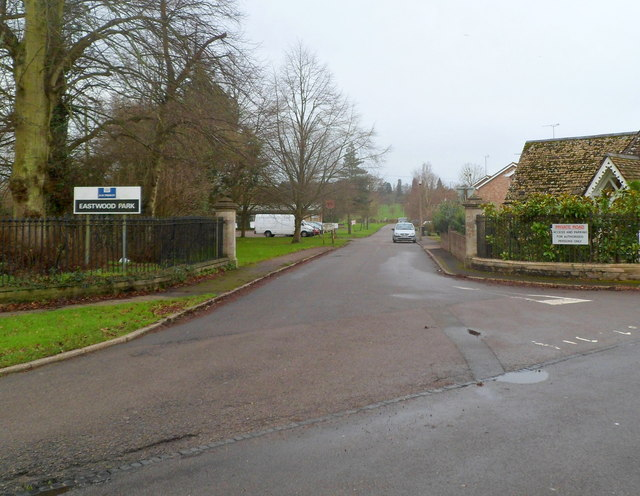
- Private road to H.M. Prison, Eastwood Park
- Interactive map of HMP Eastwood Park
- Location: Falfield, Gloucestershire; 51.6349°N 2.4684°W
- Security class: Adult Female/Now Closed
- Population: 442 (October 2016)
- Managed by: HM Prison Services
- Governor: Zoe Short
- Website: Eastwood Park at justice.gov.uk

HM Prison Eastwood Park is a women's closed category prison, located in the village of Falfield in South Gloucestershire, England. The prison is operated by His Majesty's Prison Service.

== History ==
Eastwood Park Prison originally opened as a male juvenile Detention Centre, and then became a Young Offenders Institution. In March 1996 Eastwood Park was converted into a women's prison, receiving staff and prisoners brought from the old Pucklechurch Prison.

In September 1998 the Chief inspector of Prisons issued a report warning that Eastwood Park Prison was keeping a number of inmates in cells that were below the nationally recommended standard size.

In May 2002 a further inspection of Eastwood Park found that inmates were at serious risk of suicide and self-harm. Referring to Eastwood as "an establishment in crisis", the inspection report noted that staff were having trouble creating decent conditions for its inmates, among whom 56 women had been identified as suicide risks in a single month. In that same month, the report said, 47 separate cases of self-harm had occurred.

A further report in March 2004 stated that the prison was still facing "major challenges". However the report also noted that prisoners felt safer at Eastwood Park than in women's prisons generally.

On 24 December 2014, it was announced that Prisoners are being allowed to smoke e-cigarettes as part of a pilot scheme that could lead to a jail smoking ban. The e-cigarette brand, Bull, is available in the prison shop in the jail and in other prison shops in the men's prisons HMP Preston in Lancashire and HMP Stocken in Rutland.

In May 2016 Jessica Whitchurch killed herself in Eastwood Park Prison. Other prisoners had been bullying Whitchurch and goading her to take her own life. Prison officers did not challenge the other prisoners and failed to prevent the bullying. On 18 May 2016 Whitchurch was found distressed with a ligature round her neck. Whitchurch was put under observation but the observation was insufficient and hours later Whitchurch was found unconscious with a ligature round her neck, she died later in hospital. An inquest jury was unsure if the death was suicide or extreme self harm that went wrong. The jury found that Whitchurch received inadequate care by prison staff and there were organizational failings within the prison.

Following an inspection in October 2022, the Chief Inspector of Prisons said an inspector had described conditions as the "worst he had ever seen". The inspection found that 83% of the 348 women held at the prison had reported mental health problems, with high levels of self-harm among the prisoners, but support regarding self-harm and suicide was "very poor". The prison was "fundamentally unequipped to support the women in its care" and staff received no medical supervision to help them deal with the situation. The physical situation was "appalling" with bloodstains and scratches on the walls of some cells. The Ministry of Justice responded saying one unit had been refurbished and "specialist, therapeutic support" had been restored.

== Recent governors at HM Prison Eastwood Park ==
- Emma Keating (February 2026 - Present)
- Zoe Short (January 2022 – February 2026)
- Guy Pidduck (April 2021 – January 2022)
- Suzy Dymond-White (September 2015 – April 2021)
- Simon Beecroft (March 2012 – September 2015)
- Andrea Albutt (February 2010 – February 2012)
- Paul Stickler (September 2009 – January 2010)
- Tim Beeston (January 2002 – September 2009)
- Peter Winkley (March 1996 - January 2002)

== Notable inmates ==
- Farah Damji – convicted in July 2025 of stalking, theft and fraud.
- Shauna Hoare (October 2015 – June 2016), convicted in November 2015 of manslaughter against 16-year-old Becky Watts in Bristol in February 2015. Hoare was sentenced to 17 years imprisonment. Hoare had spent her early months on remand at HM Prison Bronzefield, but was moved to HM Prison Eastwood Park in October 2015 when close to the trial date. Hoare was shipped out of Eastwood Park and back to Bronzefield in June 2016 after her appeal against her sentence was rejected.
