= Justice (title) =

Honorific for a Supreme Court judge

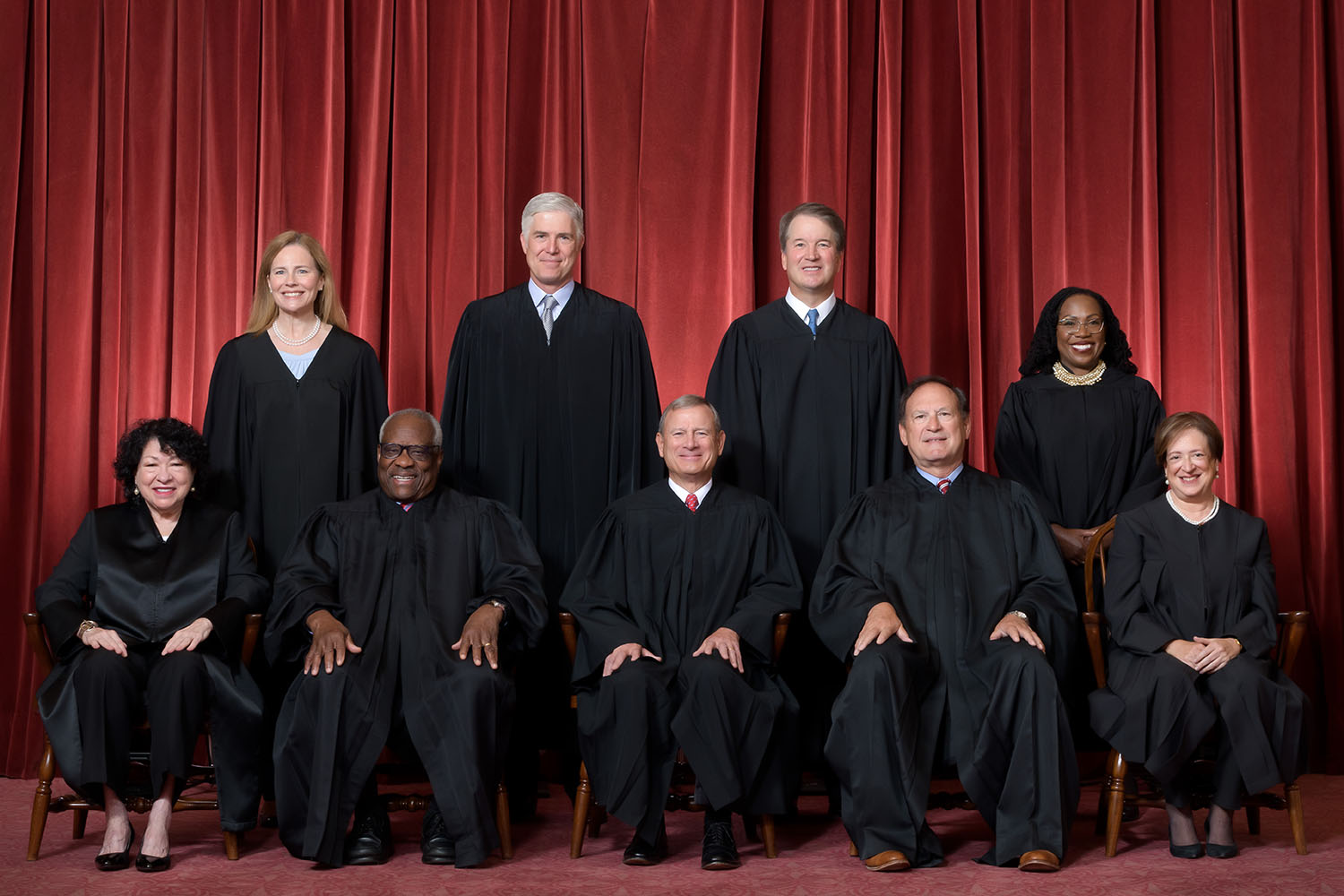
In the United States, the Supreme Court consists of eight associate justices headed by one chief justice (John Roberts).

Justice (abbreviation: [name], J. and other variations) is an honorific style and title traditionally used to describe a jurist who is currently serving or has served on a supreme court or some equal position. In some countries, a justice may have had prior experience as a judge or may have been appointed with no prior judicial experience. It is predominantly used today in the United States to distinguish those who serve on the U.S. Supreme Court from judges who serve on a lower court. Other countries, such as New Zealand and India, similarly use the title as a form of address for members of their highest courts.

== Etymology ==
The title of justice is derived from the Latin root jus (sometimes spelled ius) meaning something which is associated with law or is described as just. It is different from the word judge in that different suffixes were added to form both words, and that the usage of the term justice predates that of judge. It first appeared in the year 1137, within the Anglo-Saxon Chronicle, nearly 200 years before the first appearance of judge. The term justice developed over time to incorporate a meaning different from that of a judge with the difference continuing after the period of Middle English.

The earliest record using the word justice to describe an official appears in La Vie de Saint Thomas Becket, a French biography of Saint Thomas of Canterbury written in 1172. Its usage of the word justice referred to a judge in the service of the King of France. These early justices were members of French high society and were primarily administrators rather than those with formal training in legal affairs.

== Usage ==
=== England and Wales ===
In England and Wales, High Court judges are known as "Mr Justice ..." or "Mrs Justice ...", for example Mr Justice Goss and Mrs Justice Arbuthnot. This is often abbreviated as "J" following the name, e.g. "Goss J".

=== United States ===
The United States Supreme Court consists of eight associate justices, headed by one chief justice. Each is titled justice whereas judges on the district courts and courts of appeals are called judges. Though those appointed to the U.S. Supreme Court are usually lawyers, there is no requirement to be a judge or to have any prior experience serving in a lower court. A current example of this is Justice Elena Kagan, who served as a U.S. Solicitor General and was the Dean of Harvard Law School prior to her appointment in 2010.

Within state courts, those who serve on the highest appellate court are likewise called justices, whereas those who serve on lower courts are judges. In most states, they are legally designated as justices, rather than as judges, with the only exception being Texas, where the title is divided between a civil and criminal court. Judges on a state's lower courts are also legally designated, with the exception being only a few states.

In 1980, in anticipation for the possibility of a female justice joining the Supreme Court, it was agreed that the Mr. in Mr. Justice would be dropped. Thus, since 1980, the honorific Mr. is no longer appended to the names of justices in Supreme Court Reports, e.g. Justice Brennan's name would be given, not as Mr. Justice Brennan, but solely as Justice Brennan.

== See also ==
- Judge#Abbreviations
- Chief justice
- Associate justice
- Justice of the peace
- Supreme Court of the United States
- Chief Justice of the Common Pleas
