= 2009 Plymouth child abuse case =

English Paedophile ring

The 2009 Plymouth child abuse case was a child abuse and paedophile ring involving at least five adults from different parts of England. The case centred on photographs taken of up to 64 children by Vanessa George, a nursery worker in Plymouth. It highlighted the issue of child molestation by women, as all but one of the members of the ring were female.

== History ==
Vanessa George, a mother of two, worked for Little Teds Nursery in Plymouth, an unincorporated not-for-profit association. Between late 2008 and early 2009, Vanessa George, Colin Blanchard and Angela Allen met on Facebook, and then started to email and text message each other. The messages were often of a sexual nature, and moved on to child abuse. The police believed that the three were having a contest to see who could produce the most depraved picture. George started taking indecent pictures of children between the ages of two and five at the nursery where she worked, and also a picture of her then 14-year-old daughter. George would often send Blanchard material captured during her working hours, and Blanchard would share them with Allen.

A fourth member of the ring, Tracy Lyons, a mother of nine from Portsmouth, Hampshire, pleaded guilty in March 2010 to assault of a child by penetration, sexual assault of a child under 13, causing a child under 13 to engage in sexual activity and three offences of distributing indecent photographs of a child.

A fifth member of the ring, Tracy Dawber, a care worker from Southport, in Merseyside, was found guilty of one count of sexually abusing a baby in October 2010.

Vanessa George
- Born: Vanessa Sylvia Marks; 30 March 1970 (age 56); Plymouth, England
- Occupation: Nursery worker
- Motive: Sexual
- Penalty: Indeterminate imprisonment sentence (minimum 7 years)

Angela Allen
- Born: 7 December 1960 (age 65); Manchester, England
- Occupations: Prostitute; traffic warden
- Motive: Sexual
- Penalty: Indeterminate imprisonment sentence (minimum 5 years)

Colin Blanchard
- Born: 5 October 1970 (age 56); Rochdale, Greater Manchester, England
- Occupation: IT consultant
- Motive: Sexual
- Penalty: Indeterminate imprisonment sentence (minimum 9 years)

Tracy Lyons
- Born: 8 January 1970 (age 56); Portsmouth, England
- Motive: Sexual
- Penalty: 7 years

Tracy Dawber
- Born: 13 June 1966 (age 60); Southport, England
- Occupation: Community care worker
- Motive: Sexual
- Penalty: 4 years

== The investigation and arrests ==
In June 2009, a colleague of Colin Blanchard turned on Blanchard's laptop computer to research Blanchard's business dealings whilst Blanchard was abroad. The colleague found images of sexual abuse of babies and toddlers, which he reported to Greater Manchester Police. Police searched Blanchard's computer, and arrested him upon his return to England. Police found indecent images on his computer, and emails and texts between himself, Vanessa George and Angela Allen.

On the evening of 8 June, police arrested George, a worker at Little Teds Nursery in Plymouth. George appeared in court on 11 June on charges of sexual assault and making, possessing and distributing indecent images of children. George admitted to making 124 indecent images of children, targeting the young children of the nursery. George did not include the faces of these victims in her photographs, which made it difficult for the police to identify specific victims.

== Sentencing ==
The trial was presided over by Mr Justice Royce. George pleaded guilty to seven counts of sexual assault, and six of making and distributing indecent pictures of children. On 15 December 2009 George was given an indeterminate sentence, and told that she would serve at least seven years, with the proviso that she must prove she is safe to society before being released.

Allen pleaded guilty to distributing an indecent image, and four counts of sexual assault; all of the offences involved children. On 15 December she was also given an indeterminate sentence, with a minimum tariff of five years.

On 10 January 2011, Blanchard was given an indeterminate sentence of at least nine years, and two other members of the paedophile ring, Tracy Dawber and Tracy Lyons, were sentenced to four and seven years respectively.

== Book controversy ==
In March 2010, a book written by Wensley Clarkson, Vanessa: A Portrait of Evil caused controversy when parents of the victims protested against its publication, calling it 'sick' and saying they were 'horrified'. The author defended his position on the book, claiming it was written as an attempt to understand what George did and why she did it.

== Release of Lyons from prison ==
Lyons was released from prison in October 2011, nine months after her conviction, having spent two years in prison. Her release was condemned by child protection charity Kidscape, with a spokesperson Claude Knights stating: "This early release is a betrayal of the victims and their families whose suffering will continue for years."

== Legacy ==
The case prompted an increased recognition of the problem of female paedophiles, sex offenders, and the scale of their offending, with one estimate suggesting that at least 10% of sex offenders are female. The case also challenged the false stereotype that only men sexually abuse children. Previously some had attempted to blame the behaviour of female child sexual abusers on men, suggesting that the female child sex abusers were usually acting under duress or coercion. The case showed that the perpetrators were acting of their own free will and for their own sexual gratification. A similar pattern emerged in January 2019, when Sophie Elms, a 17-year-old childcare student in Royal Wootton Bassett, was jailed for seven years and ten months after sexually assaulting two girls aged two and three and filming the abuse to send to convicted sex offender David Geering. Michele Elliott of child protection charity Kidscape stated "the reality is women abuse, women abuse without men telling them to abuse, and I think we have to acknowledge it for the sake of the children who are being abused." The case also promoted calls for more research into the offending of female paedophiles.

The case prompted Plymouth City Council to launch a serious case review, the report of which was published on 4 November 2010. It concluded that while ultimate responsibility for the abuse rested with George and that no "professional could have reasonably predicted that George might be a risk to children", there were several failings in the nursery's management, recruitment, staff reporting and other arrangements, which had "provided an ideal environment" for her to abuse. It also speculated that either a 2008 Ofsted inspection of the nursery just months before, which rated the nursery "good" for child protection, had not been adequate, or that Ofsted's "framework for inspection is not adequate".

Little Ted's, the private nursery where the abuse took place, was situated in the grounds of Laira Green Primary School. The nursery closed at the time of the first arrests, in June 2009. In September 2010 a new facility opened in its place, a preschool unit named Greenshoots, which was to be managed jointly with the school, with the school head teacher on its board of trustees.

== Release of Vanessa George ==
Vanessa George was released from prison in September 2019 after serving ten years in prison. The parole board approved her release in July 2019.
