= The Forward Trust =

British charity

- Founder: Peter Bond, Jonathan Wallace, Michael Meakin
- Location: United Kingdom
- Website: www.forwardtrust.org.uk
- Formerly called: Rehabilitation for Addicted Prisoners Trust

The Forward Trust is a British charity that helps people with drug and alcohol dependence. Previously known as RAPt (the Rehabilitation for Addicted Prisoners Trust), it was relaunched in 2017 as Forward Trust after merging with Blue Sky organization.

The Forward Trust delivers services both in the criminal justice system and in community settings. Approximately 20,000 people every year use a 'The Forward Trust' service. The Forward Trust is the only provider of drug treatment programmes within HM Prison Service that has verifiable evidence of effectiveness.

== History ==
RAPt was established in 1991 as the Addictive Diseases Trust when Peter Bond, a recovering alcoholic, observed the success of abstinence-based programmes in the United States. He, Jonathan Wallace, Isabelle Laurent, Louise Gibbings, Matthew Wilson and Michael Meakin, set up a charity to meet the needs of drug addicts in UK prisons.

In 1992 The Addictive Diseases Trust opened the first intensive drug rehabilitation programme in a UK prison in a Portakabin at HMP Downview in Surrey. The actor Sir Anthony Hopkins, an early supporter, provided much-needed funds and remains a patron.

Catherine, Princess of Wales, a patron of the charity, delivered the keynote speech at the launch of the charity's 2021 Taking Action on Addiction campaign. She made another high-profile speech calling for compassion towards suffering addicts at the start of Addiction Awareness Week in November 2025.

== See also ==
- Alcoholism
- Drug abuse
- Drug addiction
- Drug rehabilitation
- 12-step programme
