= James Goss (judge) =

British judge (born 1953)

The Honourable Mr Justice Goss
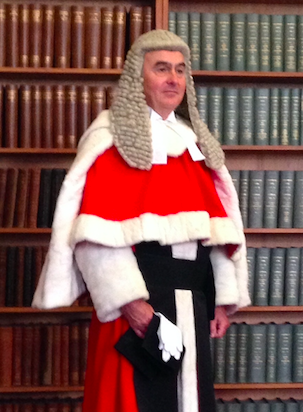
- Goss in 2014

Justice of the High Court
- In office 1 October 2014 – 1 February 2026
- Nominated by: Chris Grayling
- Appointed by: Elizabeth II
- Preceded by: Mr Justice Royce

Personal details
- Born: James Richard William Goss; 12 May 1953 (age 73)
- Education: Charterhouse School
- Alma mater: University College, Durham
- Occupation: Judge
- Profession: Barrister

Sir James Richard William Goss (born 12 May 1953), styled The Hon. Mr Justice Goss, is a retired judge of the High Court of England and Wales, assigned to the King's Bench Division. He was previously a Queen's Counsel, specialising in criminal law.

== Early life and education ==
James Richard William Goss was born on 12 May 1953 to judge William Alan Belcher Goss and his wife Yvonne. He was educated at Charterhouse School, an independent boarding school in Surrey. Goss studied at Durham University, where he was a member of University College, and graduated in 1974 with a Bachelor of Arts (BA) degree. He was later appointed an honorary fellow of Durham Law School. and is the patron of the Mr Justice Goss University College Law Prize, awarded to first-year undergraduate students.

== Legal career ==
Goss was called to the bar at the Inner Temple in 1975. He specialised in criminal law, practising from No 6, a barristers' chambers in Leeds, where he was head of chambers. He was a recorder from 1994 to 2009 and was appointed Queen's Counsel on 8 April 1997.

He was appointed a legal member of the Mental Health Tribunal in 2003 and of the Restricted Patients Panel in 2006. Goss became a circuit judge on the North Eastern Circuit on 14 December 2009. He served as a senior circuit judge and honorary recorder of Newcastle-upon-Tyne from 2011 to 2014.

On 1 October 2014, Goss became a judge of the High Court of Justice, succeeding Mr Justice Royce. He was assigned to the Queen's Bench Division and received the customary appointment as a knight bachelor.

In February 2026, Goss retired from the bench and was appointed as a judicial commissioner to the Investigatory Powers Commissioner's Office.

=== Notable cases ===
In February 2017, Goss tried a case alone after dismissing the jury in a "crash-for-cash" case due to jury tampering. This was the second time such a decision had been taken under statutory provisions introduced in 2007.

Goss presided over the trial of Carl Beech in 2019, sentencing him upon conviction to 18 years' imprisonment for fabricating allegations of child rape and murder.

Between October 2022 and August 2023, Goss presided over the trial of Lucy Letby, believed to be the longest murder trial in British legal history. On 21 August 2023 he sentenced Letby to life imprisonment with a whole-life order on seven charges of murder and the seven of attempted murder (including two counts of attempted murder against one child), totalling 14 whole life orders. Letby consequently became one of the most prolific convicted murderers in British legal history, following a trial which lasted nearly a year. By volume of whole life orders imposed, her sentence is the most severe sentence in England and Wales since the abolition of the death penalty.
