= Safiyya Amira Shaikh =

British woman convicted of terrorism offences

- Born: Michelle Ramsden; 1983 (age 42–43)
- Known for: Plotting to blow up St Paul's Cathedral
- Movement: ISIL
- Criminal penalty: Life imprisonment
- Criminal status: Incarcerated

Safiyya Amira Shaikh, formerly Michelle Ramsden, is a British woman convicted of plotting to bomb St Paul's Cathedral in London. She is thought to be the first lone female Islamic State of Iraq and the Levant (ISIL) bomb plotter in the UK. She was sentenced to life imprisonment in July 2020.

== Early life ==
Shaikh was born Michelle Ramsden in Hayes, west London, in 1983. A former company director, Shaikh converted to Islam in 2007 after an act of kindness by a Muslim family in her neighbourhood, subsequently becoming estranged from her dysfunctional family. Changing her name to Safiyya Amira (meaning pure, princess) Shaikh, she became radicalised in 2015, having fallen out with Muslim leaders who disagreed with her violent interpretations of the faith.

== Support for terrorism ==
By 2016, Shaikh had come under surveillance by police and MI5. She was referred at least three times to the deradicalisation programme Prevent, but ceased participating each time. Shaikh became active on "multiple social media platforms" and had set up an account named 'GreenB1rds' on the encrypted Telegram Messenger app; encouraging violent attacks in both the UK and abroad, and disseminating pro-ISIL propaganda. She had enjoyed watching ISIL beheading videos, glorified terrorist atrocities, had been in contact with convicted British jihadist Anjem Choudary, and had listened to lectures by extremist imam Anwar Al-Awlaki.

== Sting, arrest and conviction ==
Some time in 2019, Shaikh began formulating a plan for a terrorist attack involving various targets, including blowing up a London hotel, planting a bomb in St Paul's, and a suicide bomb attack in the London Underground. She attempted to contact someone online who could provide her with explosives. She unwittingly made contact with undercover police officers posing as extremists whom she met on at least one occasion.

Inspired by the 2019 Sri Lanka Easter bombings, Shaikh had initially planned to plant explosives at St Paul's at Christmas 2019, but put it back to Easter 2020.

On 18 August 2019, Shaikh was stopped from boarding a flight to Amsterdam at Luton Airport. Her ticket had been bought for her by Yousra Lemouesset, a Netherlands-based, ISIL-supporting terrorist who was subsequently convicted.

She was arrested at her home on 10 October 2019, after cancelling a meeting with the undercover officers. During one of her arrest interviews, she claimed she believed that killing people and blowing herself up in the process would be "my way into Heaven".

In court, her defence argued that she would not have carried out the attacks, and that she had got cold feet. However, after this argument was put forwards, Shaikh was recorded making a phone call from prison, in which she directly contradicted the defence, stating; "I'm so tired about things...I didn't get cold feet yeah...I was ready to go through with it...I wasn't having doubts."

Shaikh was given a life sentence, with a non-parole period of fourteen years.

== See also ==
- 2016–17 all-female UK terror plot
