= Farah Damji =

British criminal charged with financial and stalking crimes

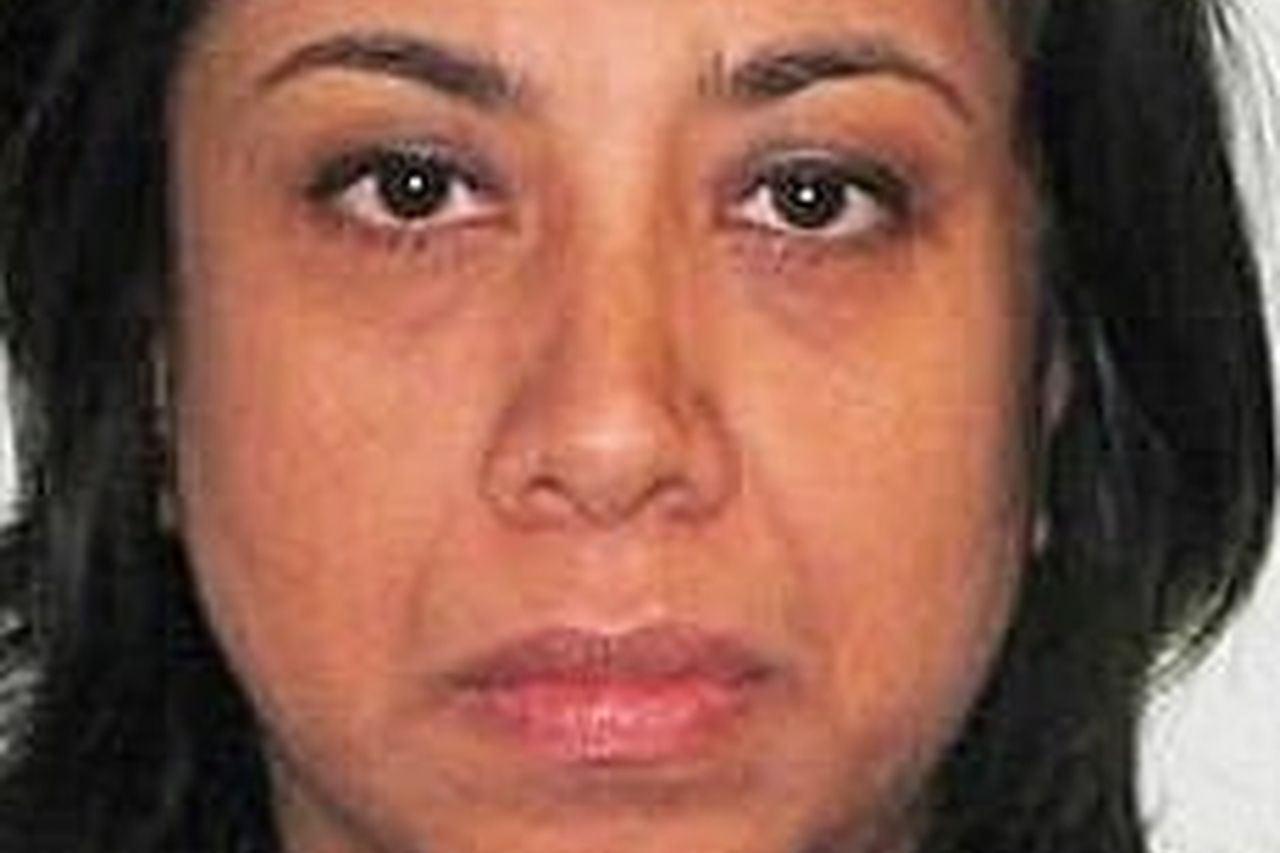
- Convicted felon Farah Damji
- Born: 9 October 1966 (age 59); Kampala, Uganda
- Other name: Farah Dan
- Citizenship: United Kingdom
- Children: 2
- Parent: Amir Damji
- Relatives: Yasmin Alibhai-Brown (aunt)
- Status: Incarcerated (sentenced on 11 July 2025)
- Convictions: Stalking (1 count); Theft (1 count); Fraud (2 counts)
- Penalty: 6 years in prison

Details
- Span of crimes: 1993–
- Country: United Kingdom, United States
- Date apprehended: 11 March 2024
- Imprisoned at: HM Prison Eastwood Park

Farah Damji (born 9 October 1966), also known as Farah Dan, is a Ugandan-born British convicted criminal with multiple convictions pertaining to fraud and stalking in the United States, South Africa, and United Kingdom. In 2016, Damji was described by The Sunday Times as "a notorious conwoman," and by other newspapers as "London's most dangerous woman" in 2021. On 11 July 2025, Damji was convicted and sentenced to six years on the charges of stalking, theft and fraud against a former British diplomat.

== Early life ==
Damji was born in Uganda in 1966 to a multi-millionaire property developer Amir Damji and moved with her family to London in 1970. She is the niece of journalist Yasmin Alibhai-Brown (Amir's sister); who refers to her niece's childhood in her autobiography No Place Like Home. Damji has a borderline personality disorder and suffered addictions to cocaine and alcohol. She is married and has two children.

== Life in the United States ==
Between 1993 and 1995 Damji ran an art gallery in Manhattan and East Hampton. At that time she rented an apartment for herself. She gave the landlord a cheque she had received for $20, which she had altered to $20,000; when the cheque bounced the landlord obtained an eviction order and seized her belongings. Damji then forged the signature of the judge assigned to the case and amended the order so that she could get her belongings back.

In October 1995 Damji was sentenced to six months in Rikers Island prison, in New York, for those crimes and other crimes related to her art gallery: five counts of grand larceny, possession of a forged instrument, and altering official records. She was also ordered to pay $72,000 to her major victims and given four years' probation.

During the time Damji was on probation she allegedly committed other crimes; when a warrant for her arrest was subsequently issued she fled the U.S.

Damji then went to South Africa; there, she committed further financial crimes, for which she was deported.

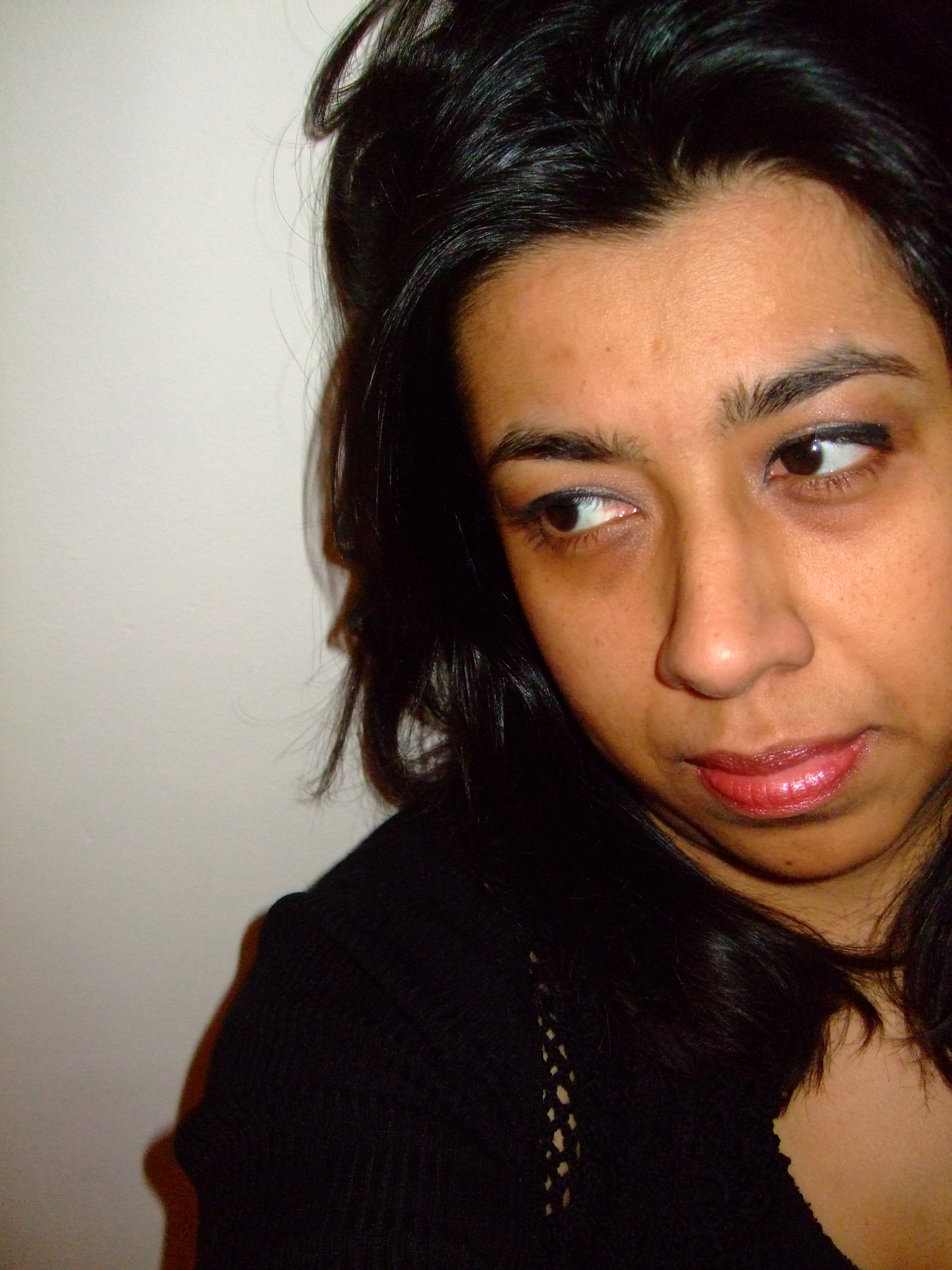

== Life in the United Kingdom ==
Damji then returned to the United Kingdom where, in 2002, she founded and became the publisher and editor of the lifestyle magazine Another Generation (originally named Indobrit). In a high court trademark dispute case she lost the use of name ‘Indobrit’, which had been coined and registered as a trademark by Dr. Anjoom Mukadam, and the magazine folded after nine issues. Dozens of writers, photographers, and other contributors to the magazine were either not paid for their work or given cheques that bounced. During this time she also wrote articles for mainstream and ethnic media, including a regular column in the Birmingham Post, an article in New Statesman, and an article in The Observer. In 2006 The Independent recalled her magazines as being "smart, readable and award-winning".

In October 2002 Damji stole a credit card from her nanny; she then ran up a bill on the card totalling £3,903. She was arrested for that, and then released on bail. While out on bail she stole another credit card from her business assistant; she then ran up a bill on that card totalling £1,030. She was arrested for that, and then released on bail again. In 2004, while out on bail, she stole another credit card and ran up bills on the card; she also committed other thefts.

The trial for the crimes committed during 2002–2004 was originally scheduled to be held in February 2005. However, before the trial Damji telephoned the main prosecution witness and, pretending to be from the Crown Prosecution Service, she told the witness that he did not need to attend court; consequently the witness did not turn up and the trial had to be adjourned. While the trial was adjourned, Damji stole more credit cards and committed further crimes.

On 14 May 2005 Damji was arrested, and this time bail was refused. Afterwards, a trial was held, concluding on 13 October 2005. Damji pleaded guilty to six counts of theft, 11 counts of obtaining property or services by deception, and two counts of perverting the course of justice. The thefts totaled about £50,000. Damji was sentenced to three and a half years in prison. The judge in the trial described her as "thoroughly dishonest and manipulative".

Damji was temporarily released from Downview Prison, on 22 July 2006 to attend a meeting with her Open University tutor, but did not return as required that same day. She was re-arrested by police five days later, on 27 July.

While Damji was in prison she began writing her autobiography; she finished the writing shortly after her release. The book was eventually published in July 2009 under the title Try Me. In the book, Damji claims to have been rehabilitated and put her criminal past behind her.

Weeks after she was released from prison, Damji began committing further frauds. In July 2009 Damji pleaded guilty to three counts of dishonestly making false representations to Hammersmith and Fulham London Borough Council, which included benefit frauds of £17,000; she additionally pleaded guilty to two counts of dishonestly making false representations to landlords, which included defrauding one landlord of £7,685. On 29 January 2010, Damji was sentenced to 15 months in prison. At the trial, the judge said "The level of dishonesty at every conceivable juncture is so persistent it's the type of case I have never come across before".

In March 2011 Damji founded the company Kazuri Properties. The company claimed to have established a "heroes center" to help former soldiers and servicemen who ended up in prison. An investigation by The Sunday Times found that the center did not exist and concluded that Damji's aim was "to take advantage of [the government's] fund for prisoner rehabilitation schemes". The company has since been dissolved.

In September 2013 Damji founded the company Coming Home (Cardiff); she claimed that the company would assist young women in finding employment. A letter announcing the launch of the company invited people to an event at Cardiff Castle, and said that the chairman of Mears Group would be attending the event. Investigation by Wales Online, however, found that the City of Cardiff Council, which owns the Castle, was unaware of the event and had received no booking for the Castle; additionally, the chairman of Mears Group said "We have no financial dealings with Ms Damji or her organisation". Damji's company was dissolved in April 2015.

On 19 August 2016 Damji was imprisoned for five years, after being found guilty of three counts of stalking. She had been originally charged with one count of stalking, on 9 January 2014. She was released on bail shortly thereafter. While out on bail, she committed two other counts of stalking: one with the same man as for the first count, and one with a different man. She had stalked under the name Farah Dan and other aliases. The stalking of the first victim included the following: sending over 180 hoax calls and texts to him; emailing the man's business associates and friends; inventing and blogging about false allegations of domestic abuse of his wife; sending sexually explicit material to his 16-year-old son; making threats of sexual violence involving his six-year-old daughter. (Damji had been previously accused of stalking the writer William Dalrymple, in 2004. Dalrymple notified the British police, but no criminal charges could be made because the alleged stalking occurred when Damji followed Dalrymple to India, and so was outside British jurisdiction. During the late 1990s, when Damji lived in the U.S., she allegedly "terrorized several ex-lovers with a Fatal Attraction-like intensity".)

In September 2017, while imprisoned at Bronzefield Prison, Damji filed a Freedom of Information request with the Ministry of Justice. The Request was for information relating to female prisoners under the supervision of a specified member of staff at the prison. The Ministry rejected the Request, on the grounds that the Request was vexatious. In February 2018, Damji appealed the Ministry's decision to the Information Commissioner's Office (ICO). On 6 June 2018, the ICO upheld the Ministry's decision, and further noted that Damji's "abusive language aimed at a specific individual suggests that [Damji] has a personal issue with the individual named in her request". On 4 July 2018, Damji appealed the ICO decision to the First-tier Tribunal; on 27 November 2018, the Tribunal dismissed her appeal.

In October 2018 Damji appeared in court accused of breaching a restraining order. On 20 February 2020 she was convicted in absentia of two counts of breaching a restraining order and was sentenced to 27 months imprisonment the following month. During her trial Damji absconded to Ireland, and in February 2020 she was convicted in absentia of two counts of breaching a restraining order, and sentenced to 27 months imprisonment. Damji was arrested in Dublin in August 2020 and faced proceedings to extradite her to the UK to serve her sentence. While in Ireland, she appealed against her UK conviction; she was unsuccessful in getting the conviction overturned but the sentence was reduced from 27 months to 18 months by the Court of Appeal on 18 December 2020. Damji also launched legal proceedings against the National Health Service, arguing that they had failed adequate mental health services to her during her previous periods of imprisonment. The High Court (Ireland) ordered her extradition back to the UK in January 2022. Damji launched several appeals against her extradition to the Court of Appeals and Supreme Court, which both upheld the extradition. She served her sentence in the UK, and was released in July 2023.

=== Latest arrest and sentencing ===
Within a few days of her release she had begun a relationship on Bumble with diplomat Dr Nigel Gould-Davies, using the false name of Noor Higham. Two months into the relationship, she began a campaign of stalking against Gould-Davies, using various fake identities to secretly send malicious claims about him to his employers and on a Twitter profile and website, and making fraudulent purchases on his credit cards, while maintaining a seemingly normal relationship with him and stealing his passport to ensure he would have to stay with her for Christmas rather than travelling to Spain to see his mother. Her deception was uncovered when Gould-Davies saw a photograph of Damji online and recognised the woman he knew as Noor Higham; he reported her to the police.

In March 2024 Damji was arrested at London's Heathrow Airport on the charges of theft of passport, harassment and fraud by the misuse of credit card relating to her ex-boyfriend. She was held on remand at the HM Prison Bronzefield. On 7 May 2025 Damji was convicted of stalking, theft and two counts of fraud by false representation. Covering all of those offences she was sentenced to six years on 11 July 2025. In her sentencing remarks, HHJ Greenberg noted that Damji had "engaged in a campaign of what can only be described as psychological torture" and had shown "not one iota of remorse for your behaviour or the harm that you have done". In September 2025, Damji was transferred to HM Prison Eastwood Park to serve out her sentence.

On 14 January 2026 the Court of Appeal dismissed Damji's appeals against sentence and conviction. The judges noted that "there is clearly an escalation, at the very least, of the seriousness of the accused's offending", and that "the accused's attitude was such that there was a significant risk, in our judgment, that there would be further offending in the future, with the requisite risk of serious harm involved".
