= HM Prison Downview =

Women's prison in Surrey, England

Coordinates: 51.3384°N 0.1881°W

HMP Downview
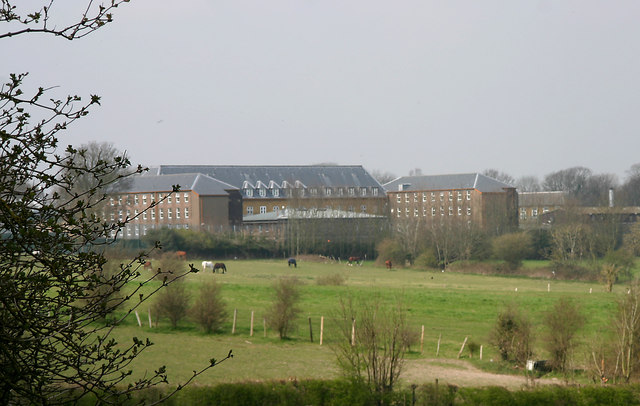
- Interactive map of HMP Downview
- Location: Sutton Lane, Banstead SM2 5PD, Surrey
- Security class: Adult Female/Closed
- Population: 283 (June 2013)
- Opened: 1989; 37 years ago
- Managed by: HM Prison Services
- Governor: Amy Dixon
- Website: Downview at justice.gov.uk

HM Prison Downview is a women's closed category prison. Downview is located on the outskirts of Banstead in Surrey, England (overlooking Banstead Downs), and is immediately adjacent to the southern boundary of Belmont in Greater London. The prison is operated by His Majesty's Prison Service, and is situated in proximity to High Down Prison for men.

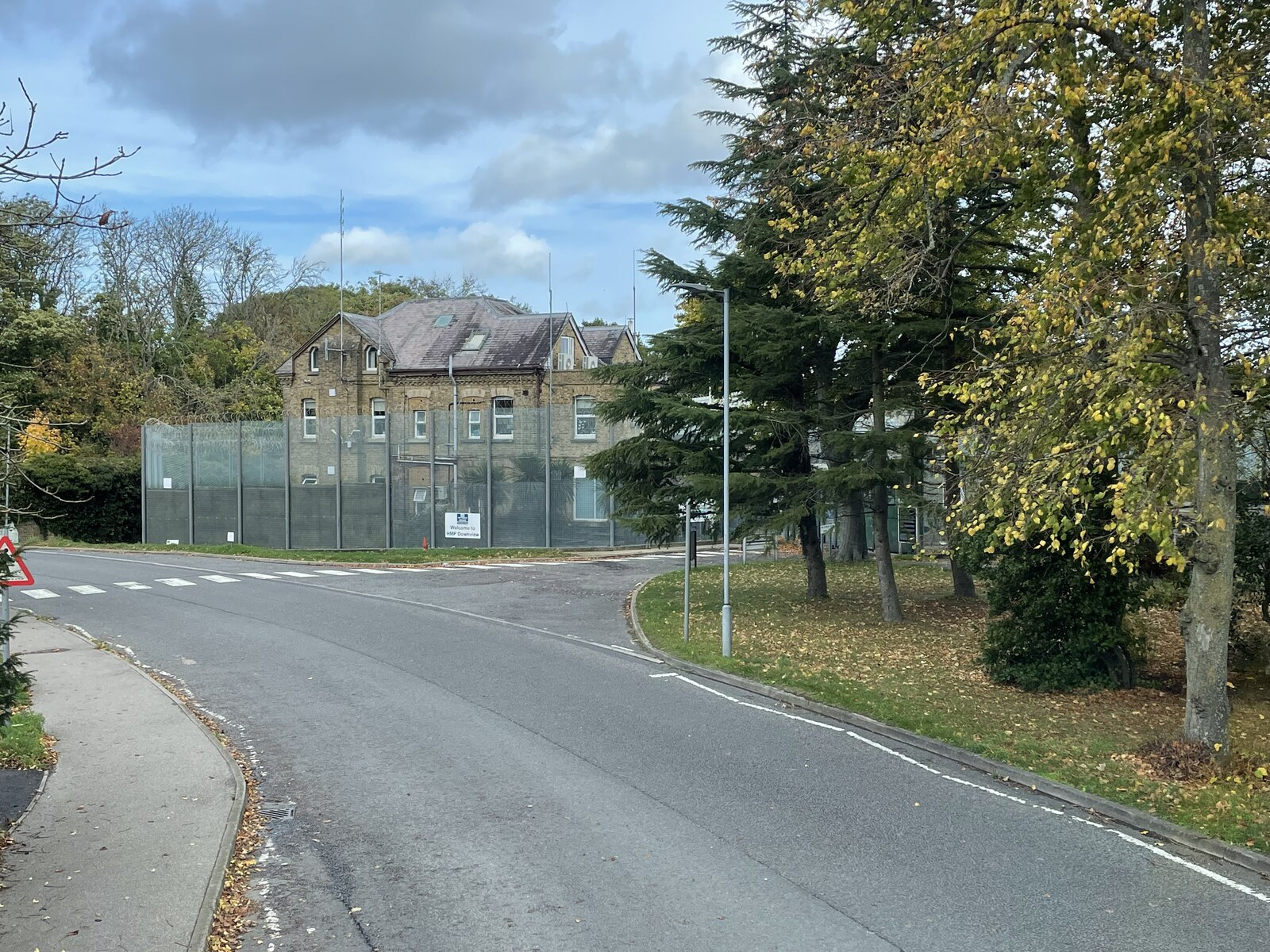
Entrance to HMP Downview

== History ==
Downview was converted from a former nurses' home of Banstead Hospital; it opened in 1989 as a Category C male prison.

In 1992, HMP Downview saw the establishment of the UK's first intensive drug and alcohol rehabilitation programme. The programme was established by the Rehabilitation for Addicted Prisoners Trust and was opened by Anthony Hopkins, who remains a patron of the trust.

In September 2001, owing to increased demand for places at women's prisons in the UK, Downview's role changed to a "closed" prison for adult women. A year later, one of the prison's chaplains resigned after claims that he had demanded sexual favours from inmates in exchange for communion wine.

In December 2004 a sixteen-bed juvenile unit opened at Downview for young female offenders (both remand and convicted) aged from 15-18, in partnership with the Youth Justice Board.

The PRIME project was launched at Downview in April 2006; it is now known as The Media House. It is a media educational and broadcast facility inside the prison. The project, managed by Maria Esposito from 2007 to 2013, has won several awards including the Butler Trust Award in 2010/11. Prisoners can achieve a BTEC qualification for completing the 16-week course.

== The prison today ==
Downview Prison holds adult sentenced female prisoners. Downview is divided into 4 wings, A, B, C and D (D wing is a resettlement wing). All wings have single-cell accommodation with in-cell electricity and telephony.

The prison offers vocational training courses and NVQs for inmates. The resettlement wing provides opportunities for inmates to work and receive education outside the prison.

On 4 September 2013, the Ministry of Justice announced that it intended to convert Downview into a prison for adult males. It closed as a women's prison in preparation for conversion, but in 2016 it reopened as a women's prison when HM Prison Holloway was closed, taking many of its prisoners.

In March 2019, the Ministry of Justice announced that a wing within the prison would be used solely to house transgender inmates, making it the first unit in the UK to serve this purpose.

== Notable inmates ==
- Farah Damji, convicted fraudster
- Vivienne Taylor, convicted in 2026, of stalking her gender affirmation surgeon Tina Rashid
