= Tareena Shakil =

Former English terrorist

- Born: 1989 (age 36–37); Birmingham
- Other names: umm_amaanah, princess_meena
- Status: Released in 2018
- Criminal charges: Being a member of the Islamic State, encouraging acts of terrorism
- Penalty: Six years' imprisonment (minimum three years)

Tareena Shakil (born 1989) is a British former terrorist who is notable for being the first, and only, British woman convicted of having travelled to Syria to join the Islamic State of Iraq and the Levant. She was sentenced to six years' imprisonment in 2016 for willingly joining the terrorist group and for encouraging terrorist acts online. She had chosen to take her toddler son to Syria with her, and was later discovered to have made the one-year-old child pose with an AK-47 and wear Islamic State balaclavas for photographs.

Both before and during the months before she travelled to join ISIL she posted content on social media supporting the Islamic State and justifying their actions, telling people to "take to arms". She messaged friends on the day she arrived in Syria saying that it was her 'responsibility' as a Muslim to kill 'murtadeen' apostates and that she wanted to die a martyr and carry out jihad, yet would later claim that she had never agreed with killing anyone. Amongst other lies her trial judge concluded she made were her claims that she had not known that ISIS had committed atrocities before she went, her stories that she had been "kidnapped" to Syria (before admitting she had gone of her own free will), and what The Guardian described as her 'odd' claims that she had only put her child in an ISIS balaclava because the toddler "enjoyed wearing hats".

Shakil claimed that she soon grew disillusioned with the Islamic State and wanted to escape, but there was "no police there for me to ring to help". She returned to the UK but was quickly arrested. She was released from prison in 2018 and was subsequently the subject of the 2021 ITV documentary Tareena: Return from ISIS, in which she gave interviews.

== Crimes ==
In October 2014, Shakil flew from East Midlands Airport to Turkey with her recently born son, lying to friends by saying that she was going on a family beach holiday, before crossing into ISIL stronghold Syria. On the day she arrived in Syria, she messaged friends and told them she would not be returning to Britain and told her family it was her responsibility as a Muslim to kill the 'murtadeen' (apostates) and that she wanted to die a martyr. In one message, she said that "this is my jihad" and in others urged people to come and fight for ISIL. Shakil claims that she never sent messages that advocated killing people and has "never agreed" with killing anybody, but when a relative attempted to persuade her that it was not a Muslim's duty to kill and that the Prophet had never said so, she replied that "it's part of our deen (duty) to kill the murtadeen".

She would later tell police she had only joined because she wanted to become a "Jihadi bride", although she conflictingly claimed in the 2021 documentary on her that she had never realised when researching ISIL before she left that women were expected to get married when there, claiming she had found nothing that had said that. However, police later discovered that she had regularly engaged with a number of blogs about ISIS before she left to Syria which were written by foreign women who had travelled there, and these made it clear that it was an expectation for all women to marry in the Islamic State. After Shakil arrived in Syria, she lived in the ISIS capital Raqqa in a guest house for single women who were preparing to marry foreign fighters. She posted photos of her posing with the Islamic State flag, made her child wear an ISIS-branded balaclava and posed him with an AK-47.

In the lead-up to going to Syria, Shakil had been in contact with ISIS extremists including Sally-Anne Jones and Aqsa Mahmood, had posted an ISIS flag on her Facebook profile and sent people messages that were supportive of the group, including images of ISIS fighters and religious passages that she believed justified the group's actions. She says that she put the IS flag on her profile to "support the caliphate", but now claims that she did "not know" at that time that the flag was related to the Islamic State. She changed her Facebook biography, encouraging people to "take to arms" if they were angered by events in Syria. Shakil had also followed people on Twitter who celebrated ISIS fighters.

She had become interested in Syria after a series of pro-Palestinian marches in the UK in the summer of 2014, and engaged with "attractive" ISIS Portuguese fighter Fabio Pocas online, enticed by his profile pictures with weapons and his accounts of attempting to establish an Islamic "caliphate" in Syria. Pocas himself is notorious for committing some of ISIS's most publicly shocking acts, with it believed that he had involvement in the kidnapping of British photojournalist John Cantlie and him also being credited by IS for making the execution video for the burning alive of the Jordanian pilot Muath al-Kasasbeh in a cage. By the time Shakil became engaged in the topic of Syria, IS had carried out a number of public beheadings of Westerners they had kidnapped, which made international news and which there was front-page coverage of in the UK. Prominent examples such as the cases of US citizens James Foley and Steven Sotloff led to widespread outrage, as well as the beheadings of British aid workers David Haines and Alan Henning. Shakil accepts that she was fully aware of this "horrific" violence before she chose to travel there, but still willingly decided to go with her one-year-old son.

According to Shakil, once in Islamic State territory, she soon decided that she had made a 'mistake' and wanted to return. She would later complain that there was "no police there for me to ring to help". At the time she decided to leave ISIL's Syrian capital of Raqqa, it was coming under military bombardment from opposing forces, which may have been the reason she decided to leave the 'caliphate'. She successfully escaped by bribing a taxi driver to drive her to the Turkish border where she surrendered to Turkish border guards. She was arrested by British police as soon as she flew back to Heathrow Airport. Her son was placed in foster care and later cared for by his paternal grandmother.

There have been a number of critics of Shakil's escape story, particularly due to her claims that she had been initially allowed to leave the home for unmarried women by its authoritarian owner to go and buy internet credit. Experts at her later trial would testify that this would not be possible because of extreme limits on married women's movement in the streets of Raqqa, let alone for non-married women.

== Trial ==
Shakil initially told police that it had "never been her intention to enter Syria" and that she had been kidnapped there, something she now admits was a lie. At trial, Shakil claimed she had been 'forced' to pose with the machine guns and only went because she wanted to live under sharia law. "Oddly", The Guardian commented, she told the jury that she had only put her child in an ISIL balaclava because the toddler "enjoyed wearing hats".

The prosecution, however, asserted that she in fact knew full well what she had been doing when she went to Syria, as evidenced by the fact that she had not only encouraged acts of terrorism in messages to others but called for others to come and fight for the Islamic State and had researched Syria since 2014. Shakil, however, continued to claim that "I just wanted to live an Islamic life, not to kill anybody". She accepted that she was aware of the eminent news reports about ISIS before had gone, but said she hadn't heard they were committing atrocities, something her trial judge would later reject as false. Evidence such as a picture taken of an assault rifle was presented. Shakil claims that the weapon belonged to the husband of the owner of the single-women house, and that he "must have left it and gone somewhere" and the women and her then started taking pictures with it, and she said there is "nothing else to that picture". She says that the picture of her son next to a gun was not taken by her. However, other images of Shakil with guns which she had tried to delete were recovered from her phone by police and used as evidence against her at her trial.

The jury did not believe her version of events and she was found guilty and sentenced to four years' imprisonment for being a member of ISIL and two years for encouraging acts of terror. Members of Shakil's family disliked the verdict, but Shakil herself admitted that she had decided of her own free will to go to Syria. The trial judge was critical of her stories, saying:

"You told lie after lie to the police and in court... including that you were kidnapped, were not responsible for any tweets and any incriminating photographs were staged against your will. Most alarming is the fact that you took your son and how he was used. The most abhorrent photographs were those taken of your son wearing a balaclava with an ISIS logo and specifically the photograph of your son, no more than a toddler, standing next to an AK47 under a title which, translated from the Arabic, means "Father of the British jihad". You were well aware that the future which you had subjected your son to was very likely to be indoctrination and thereafter life as a terrorist fighter... Having seen you give evidence I saw no evidence of remorse about what you had done or done to your son."

Children's charity the NSPCC said in a statement: "This is a deeply disturbing case which could have resulted in tragedy for the toddler involved." His language skills were noticeably delayed and he showed signs of emotional disturbance and a persistent interest in guns.

The case received international press attention. Shakil's father declared that she had done "nothing wrong" and that she was "the perfect daughter". Shakil later said she "couldn't believe" that she had been charged with being a member of ISIS, but accepted in 2021 that she had realised that going to live in the Islamic State "shows obviously support for ISIL, and that way could be deemed and seen as membership".

== Release ==
Shakil was released on license from prison in 2018. A convicted terrorist, Shakil must notify police of her personal details as part of her release conditions, including informing them of her home address for 15 years after her release. In 2021, Shakil claimed that she was now "ashamed" of her actions and said she "regrets everything". She said she hopes to regain custody of her son.

In 2021, an ITV documentary was published about her, titled Tareena: Return from ISIS. She gave several interviews for the documentary and revealed close relationships with fighters she had in Syria. On the documentary, it was revealed that Shakil, despite claiming to have in fact never married in Syria, had messaged several people during her time there telling them she had moved out with her new husband. It is believed that the man she may have married was American ISIL fighter Russell Dennison, and Shakil admitted in the documentary that she knew the man and had "an arrangement" with him, but that she did not want to say any more. She had previously refused to comment on this and other matters at all in 2018 interviews, as she was still on license from prison.

When asked if she was a 'terrorist' in the documentary she denied it, saying that "I don't think I would be sitting here, having gone through everything I'd been through, on this very tough journey, if I was," and that "I came back knowing what I'd have to face: possible prison, having my child removed from me." This is despite she had previously said that when she escaped from Syria she did not realise she would face further punishment.

Shakil suggested in the 2021 documentary on her that Shamima Begum, another British person who had travelled to join ISIL and who had become the subject of a large public debate over whether she should be allowed to return, should not be allowed to come back to the UK.

In April 2023, it was reported that Shakil wanted to become an Instagram influencer. She has about 50,000 TikTok followers as of April 2026, where she posts dating advice.

== Personal life ==
Shakil grew up in Burton upon Trent. Her mother is white British and father, from Pakistan, has more than 25 convictions, including violence and drug offences. She studied psychology at university, but left without her degree when she married. Her marriage was unstable and she spent time homeless.

After release from jail she was not allowed to go to Burton upon Trent, nor to contact her son or younger siblings, and was subject to electronic tagging and a curfew. She moved to Birmingham and worked in cleaning, table service, and admin. She describes herself as a victim of "grooming".

== See also ==
- Sophie Kasiki
- Samantha Sally
- Zahera Tariq
- 2016–17 all-female UK terror plot
