= St Paul's Cathedral bomb plot =

ISIL supporter and suicide attack

In 2019, Safiyya Amira Shaikh, a supporter of the Islamic State of Iraq and the Levant (ISIL), plotted to suicide bomb St Paul's Cathedral in the City of London, United Kingdom.

Shaikh was born Michelle Ramsden in 1983 and has a daughter. She is from a very dysfunctional family and became a drug addict. She converted to Islam in 2007 and became estranged from her family. She became radicalised during the mid-2010s into supporting ISIL and was in online contact with other Islamists. She was investigated for her online extremism by the police, who had online conversations with her. She met an undercover police officer in west London in September 2019 and was arrested the following month. In February 2020 at the Old Bailey, Shaikh pleaded guilty to preparing an act of terrorism, which she intended to carry out on 12 April 2020, (Easter Sunday), using an explosive belt. On 3 July 2020, Shaikh, who lived in Hayes, west London, wore a black hijab as she was sentenced to life imprisonment with a minimum term of 14 years.

Shaikh also planned to plant a bomb at a Central London hotel and planned a suicide bombing on the London Underground.
