= Yasmin Alibhai-Brown =

British journalist and author (born 1949)

Yasmin Alibhai-Brown FRSL
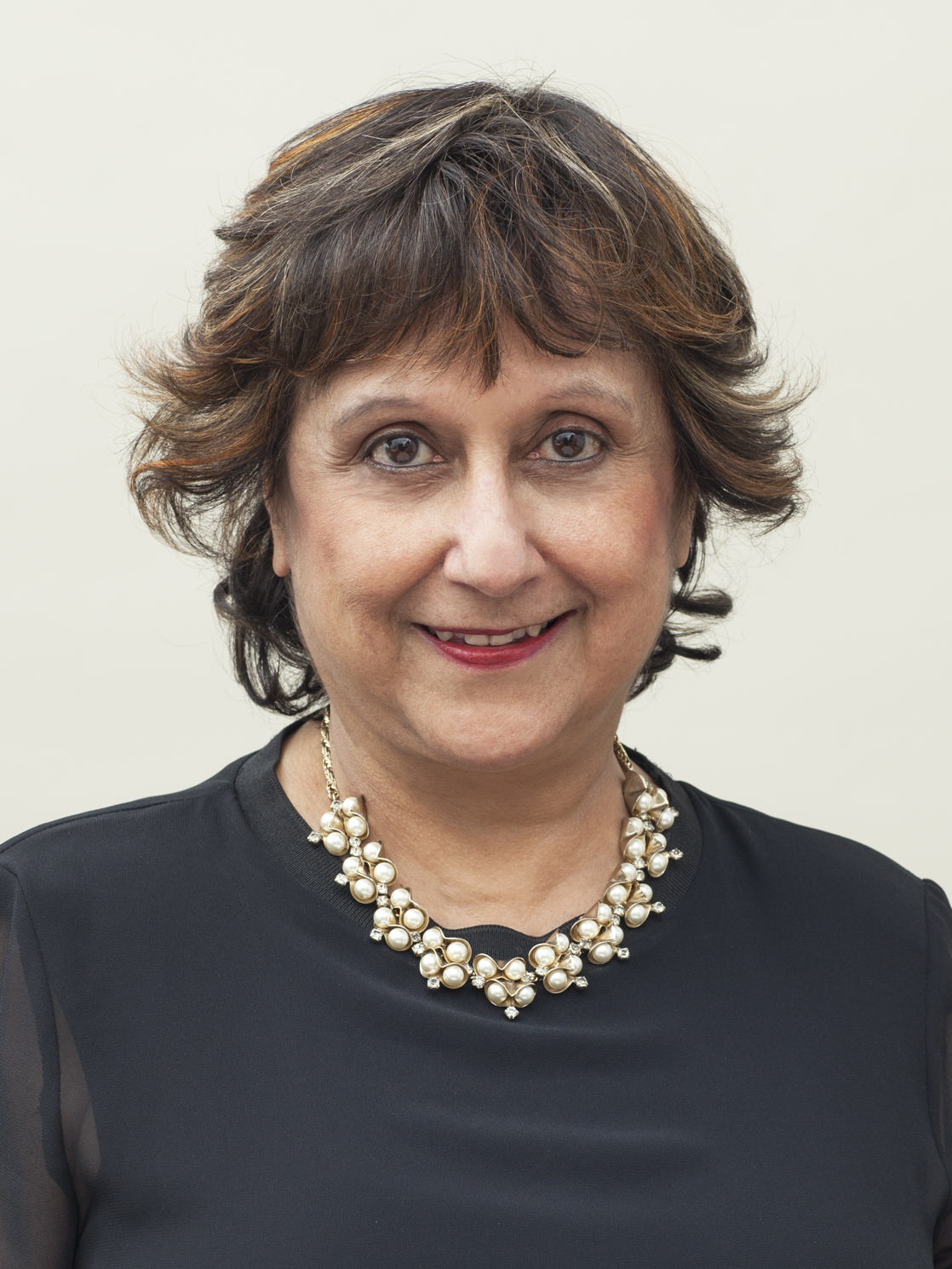
- Alibhai-Brown in 2016
- Born: Yasmin Damji; 10 December 1949 (age 76); Kampala, Uganda
- Education: Makerere University; Linacre College, University of Oxford
- Occupations: Journalist; author
- Notable credit(s): Independent, Evening Standard, The i Paper columnist
- Spouse: Colin Brown
- Children: 2
- Relatives: Farah Damji (niece)

Yasmin Alibhai-Brown FRSL (née Damji; born 10 December 1949) is a Ugandan-born journalist and author of south Asian background who now lives in the UK. A columnist for The i Paper and the Evening Standard, she is a commentator on immigration, diversity, and multiculturalism issues.

She was the founder of the British Muslims for Secular Democracy. She was also a patron of the SI Leeds Literary Prize.

== Early life and family ==
Yasmin Damji was born in 1949 into the Indian community in Kampala, Uganda. Her family belonged to the Nizari Ismaili branch of the Shia Islamic faith, and she regards herself as a Shia Muslim. Her mother was born in East Africa and her father moved there from British India in the 1920s.

After graduating in English literature from Makerere University in 1972, Alibhai-Brown left Uganda for Britain, along with her niece, Farah Damji, shortly before the expulsion of Ugandan Asians by Idi Amin, and completed a Master of Philosophy degree in literature at Linacre College, Oxford, University of Oxford, in 1975. After working as a teacher, particularly with immigrants and refugees, she moved into journalism in her mid-thirties.

Alibhai-Brown is married to Colin Brown, former chairman of the Consumer Services Panel of the Financial Services Authority, whom she met in 1988. The couple have a daughter, and Alibhai-Brown has a son from a previous marriage. Alibhai-Brown describes herself as "a leftie liberal, anti-racist, feminist, Muslim, part-Pakistani...person".

== Career and views ==
A journalist on the New Statesman magazine in the early 1980s, Alibhai-Brown contributes a weekly column to The Independent. She has also written for The Guardian, The Observer, The New York Times, Time magazine, Newsweek, and the Daily Mail, and has appeared on the current affairs TV shows Dateline London and The Wright Stuff. Alibhai-Brown has won awards for her journalism, including Media Personality of the Year in 2000 (awarded by the Ethnic Multicultural Media Academy (EMMA)), the George Orwell Prize for Political Journalism in 2002, and the EMMA Award for Journalism in 2004.

Alibhai-Brown was a research fellow at the Institute for Public Policy Research (IPPR), a think tank associated with New Labour, from 1996 to 2001. She ended her connection with the Labour Party over the 2003 war in Iraq and other issues, and supported the Liberal Democrats in the 2005 and 2010 general elections. She is senior research associate at the Foreign Policy Centre, an honorary fellow at Liverpool John Moores University, and honorary visiting professor at Cardiff and Lincoln Universities.

In the New Year Honours 2001, Alibhai-Brown was appointed a Member of the Order of the British Empire (MBE) "for services to journalism". In 2003, Benjamin Zephaniah's public refusal of an OBE inspired her to return the award. She wrote that her decision had been made partly in a growing spirit of republicanism and partly in protest at the Labour government, particularly its conduct of the war in Iraq, and she has since criticised the British honours system as "beyond repair".

In 2005, she performed her autobiographical one-woman show Tales of an Extravagant Stranger at the Soho Theatre, under the auspices of the Royal Shakespeare Company. In 2006, the charity British Muslims for Secular Democracy was formed. The writer Imran Ahmad, who was another early committee member, cites Alibhai-Brown as the organisation's founder.

Stephen Pollard accused her of racism and called her opinions "utterly vile" in The Jewish Chronicle in June 2008 after she referred to black and Asian supporters of the Conservative Party as "Uncle Toms".

In October 2009, Luciana Berger, MP and then director of Labour Friends of Israel (LFI), criticised Alibhai-Brown for writing in her column: "All three parties were lavishly entertained by the over-influential Friends of Israel." Berger said that Alibhai-Brown had not attended the LFI event or provided any evidence to sustain her comment. Berger said the hospitality ("house wine or orange juice and chips. Crisps and peanuts if you got to a bowl in time") was not lavish.

In May 2011, Alibhai-Brown wrote in The Independent that Muslims and others should stop focusing solely on the wrongdoings of Israel, saying: "We Muslims need to accept our burdens too." She also said: "It is no longer morally justifiable for activists to target only Israel and either ignore or find excuses for corrupt, murderous Arab despots. That kind of selectivity discredits pro-Palestinian campaigners and dishonours the principles of equality and human rights." Brown previously condemned ethnic minority campaigners against racism failing to mention white victims of racially motivated crimes, suggesting they were guilty of double standards. Highlighting cases such as the murder of Ross Parker, Alibhai-Brown wrote: "Our values are worthless unless all victims of these senseless deaths matter equally", adding "to treat some victims as more worthy of condemnation than others is unforgivable and a betrayal of anti-racism itself".

In May 2012, Alibhai-Brown received an anonymous three-page letter alleging that while the sender was a schoolgirl in the 1970s she (the anonymous sender) had been sexually abused by veteran BBC presenter Stuart Hall. After Alibhai-Brown passed the letter to police, an investigation was initiated, culminating in Hall being arrested and charged with multiple counts of sexual assault. On 16 April 2013, Hall pleaded guilty to sexually assaulting 13 girls, aged from nine to 17, during the period 1967–86. The police credited Alibhai-Brown's actions as instrumental in triggering an investigation into Hall's past.

In 2016, Alibhai-Brown won the Columnist of the Year Broadsheet at the British Press Awards. In 2017, she received the "Outstanding Contribution to Media Award" at the Asian Media Awards, presented by Sarfraz Manzoor.

Alibhai-Brown was elected a Fellow of the Royal Society of Literature in 2022.

== Select bibliography ==
- The Colour of Love: Mixed Race Relationships (with Anne Montague) (1992). London: Virago. ISBN 1-85381-221-8
- Racism (Points of View), (with Colin Brown) (1992). Hodder Wayland. ISBN 1-85210-651-4
- No Place Like Home (1995). London: Virago. ISBN 1-85381-642-6
- True Colours (1999). London: Institute for Public Policy Research. ISBN 1-86030-083-9
- Who Do We Think We Are? Imagining the New Britain (2000). London: Penguin. ISBN 0-14-025598-2
- After Multiculturalism (2000). London: Foreign Policy Centre. ISBN 0-9535598-8-2
- Mixed Feelings: The Complex Lives of Mixed Race Britons (2001). London: Women's Press. ISBN 0-7043-4706-7
- Some of My Best Friends Are... (2004). London: Politico's. ISBN 1-84275-107-7
- The Settler’s Cookbook: A Memoir of Love, Migration and Food (2008). Portobello Books. New edition (2010) Granta Books. ISBN 978-1846270840
- Refusing the Veil (2014). Biteback Publishing.
- Exotic England; The Making of a curious Nation (2015). Portobello Books. ISBN 978-1846274190
- In Defence of Political Correctness (2018). Biteback Publishing. ISBN 978-1785904141
- Ladies Who Punch: Fifty trailblazing women whose stories you should know (2020). Biteback Publishing. ISBN 978-1785904769
