= Benefit fraud in the United Kingdom =

Illegal claiming of UK government benefits

Benefit fraud is a form of welfare fraud as found within the system of government benefits paid to individuals by the welfare state in the United Kingdom.

== Definition of benefit fraud ==
The Department for Work and Pensions (DWP) define benefit fraud as when someone obtains state benefit they are not entitled to or deliberately fails to report a change in their personal circumstances. The DWP stated that fraudulent benefit claims amounted to around £900 million in 2019–20.

The most common form of benefit fraud is when a person receives unemployment benefits, while working. Another common form of fraud is when the receivers of benefits claim that they live alone, but they are financially supported by a partner or spouse. Failing to inform the state about a "change of circumstances", for example, that a claimant is now living with a partner, has moved house, or has inherited money from the death of a relative, may also be fraud by omission.

In 2002, the DWP launched a 'Targeting Benefit Thieves' advertising campaign to spread their message that benefit fraud carried a criminal sanction. The most recent campaign makes claims about the likelihood of getting caught and the consequences of committing benefit fraud using ‘And they thought they’d never be caught’ as the leading slogan.

The Department of Work and Pensions (DWP) has initiated a significant anti-fraud initiative described as the largest crackdown on welfare fraud in a generation. Central to this effort is the proposed Public Authorities (Fraud, Error and Recovery) Bill, which includes provisions enabling the government to recover funds directly from the bank accounts of individuals found guilty of fraud. The bill is scheduled for introduction to Parliament on Wednesday, 22 January 2025, with the DWP projecting that the measures could save taxpayers approximately £1.5 billion over the next five years. Government data indicates that £8.6 billion was lost to fraud and error overpayments in the financial year ending April 2024.

== Latest figures ==
For 2019–20 the government's benefit fraud figure was £2.3bn (1.2%) for benefits administered by the Department for Work and Pensions. The tax credit system, administered by HMRC, has combined error and fraud figures (net over-payment) for 2015–16 of £1.35 billion or 4.8% of finalised tax credit entitlement. HMRC said that "the vast majority of organised fraud claims are stopped quickly and awards in payment are terminated."

== Public opinion on benefit fraud ==
The State of the Nation report published in 2010 by the Government of David Cameron estimated the total benefit fraud in the United Kingdom in 2009/10 to be approximately £1 billion. Figures from the Department for Work and Pensions show that benefit fraud is thought to have cost taxpayers £1.2 billion during 2012–13, up 9 per cent on the year before. A poll conducted by the Trades Union Congress in 2012 found that perceptions among the British public were that benefit fraud was high – on average people thought that 27% of the British welfare budget was claimed fraudulently; however, official UK Government figures have stated that the proportion of fraud was 0.7% of the total welfare budget in 2011/12.

== Alleged disproportionality ==
In a 2007 article for The Guardian, the political scientist Adam Taylor wrote that the targeting of benefit fraud was disproportionate and was evidence of "government using strong-arm tactics on the weakest members of British society": the disabled and the poor. Taylor argued that the amount of money lost to false benefit claims was small compared to the huge amount lost to tax fraud which he estimated as costing the UK economy £150bn (this compares to the HMRC estimate of £4.1bn), yet he believed that comparatively little and in most cases nothing at all was done to pursue corporate tax evaders who defraud the people of the UK. Taylor argued that the crucial difference between these two practices is that "the former is committed by the weakest and most vulnerable of society, while the far more damaging crime is being committed by the richest (and the most corrupt traitors) in the UK."

In comparison to the estimated £1.2bn to £1.3bn lost to benefit fraud per year according to official statistics, the tax "gap" for 2013/2014 stood at the far higher figure of £34bn, or 6.4%. The tax gap is the shortfall between what is estimated by HM Revenue and Customs to be due in tax and what is actually collected. This figure includes "£14bn in uncollected income tax, national insurance and capital gains tax and £13.1bn in uncollected VAT". The amount lost to benefits fraud in 2013/14 represented 0.7% of the total benefits spending, and was the same in the year prior.

== Fraud investigation ==
Since the introduction of the Welfare Reform Act 2007, councils can independently investigate a number of Social Security benefits.

== Assessment of benefit fraud assessed ==
A potential benefit fraudster may be investigated when a third party reports them, and provides evidence, to the police or the Job Centre. That is to say that the two key reasons for investigating someone are:

- Because they are reported by someone who has evidence they are committing fraud.
- Because they accidentally give away to the Job Centre evidence of their own fraud.

When investigating cases, Fraud Officers will collect facts and a decision will be made on whether or not to take further action. They may gather information about the claimant and their family members, then compare it with information already given on claim forms or in interviews.

Officers can contact private and public organisations that hold information on a suspected benefit thief including banks, building societies, utility providers. If evidence is found that benefit fraud has been committed, any of the following may happen:

- prosecution
- pay a penalty as an alternative to prosecution
- the benefit may be reduced or withdrawn
- overpaid benefit will have to be paid back
- confiscation of homes and possessions

== Benefit fraud abroad ==
Some UK benefits can not be claimed when people go abroad. Between April 2008 and March 2009 it was estimated that £55 million was lost as a result of benefit fraud overpayments to British claimants who did not tell the authorities they were living or travelling abroad.

== Penalties ==
When someone is caught for benefit fraud there are three key 'sanctions' that DWP or the council can apply. These are formal cautions, administrative penalties and prosecution. By section 121 of the Welfare Reform Act 2012 from 8 May 2012 cautions will no longer be offered by DWP.

The main criterion for the offering of a caution is that the person has to have admitted that they have committed an offence. Other than this criterion, there is no statutory framework regulating which sanction is used in disposal of a case. This is a matter of policy for the relevant authority. The Department for Work and Pensions has a national policy; each Local Authority will have its own Policy which will set different criteria and financial guidelines.

The Administrative Penalty is effectively a fine and is set at 30% or 50% of the total amount overpaid to them (the percentage applied is dependent upon when the overpayment period commenced - overpayments occurring wholly on or after 08.05.2012 incur a 50% fine). This figure is set in section 115A(3) Security Administration Act 1992 there is no negotiation on this. In addition to this, benefit thieves also need to pay back all of the money they deliberately defrauded. The suspect does not have to admit their guilt to be offered an Administrative Penalty, however it should only be offered by the Department for Work and Pensions, or the Local Authority if they believe there is sufficient evidence for court proceedings to be considered if the offer is refused.

Prosecution may typically occur in England & Wales using the Social Security Administration Act 1992, or under the Theft Act 1978, or the Fraud Act 2006; in Northern Ireland under corresponding legislation; or in Scotland under Common Law Fraud. A Prosecution is brought when the value of the overpaid benefit is so great, or the period of the fraud is lengthy, or the person may have been in a position of trust, or the fraud was very blatant. Any prosecution brought by the Department for Work and Pensions or a Local Authority should have been subject to the Public Interest Test as set out in the Code of Practice for Crown Prosecutors. In Scotland cases of benefit fraud are reported to the Procurator Fiscal for prosecution.

== Prosecution – legal points ==
Where cases of benefit fraud result in criminal prosecution, in England & Wales such prosecutions are generally brought either under section 112 Social Security Administration Act 1992 (where no dishonesty is alleged) or under s111A of the same Act (where dishonesty is alleged). There are a number of legal cases relevant to prosecutions under these sections. Key points are dealt with in more detail in technical articles on benefit fraud.

The penalties for benefit fraud may be mitigated where it can be shown that the defendant would have been entitled to other forms of financial benefit, such as UK Tax Credits, had an appropriate claim on the true facts been lodged at the time.

A person convicted of benefit fraud may be held to have a 'criminal lifestyle' in confiscation proceedings under Parts 2, 3 & 4 of the Proceeds of Crime Act 2002.

== See also ==
- Tax evasion
- Carousel fraud
- Disability fraud
- Criticisms of welfare
- Farah Damji
