= Falfield =

Village and civil parish in South Gloucestershire

Coordinates: 51.637°N 2.459°W

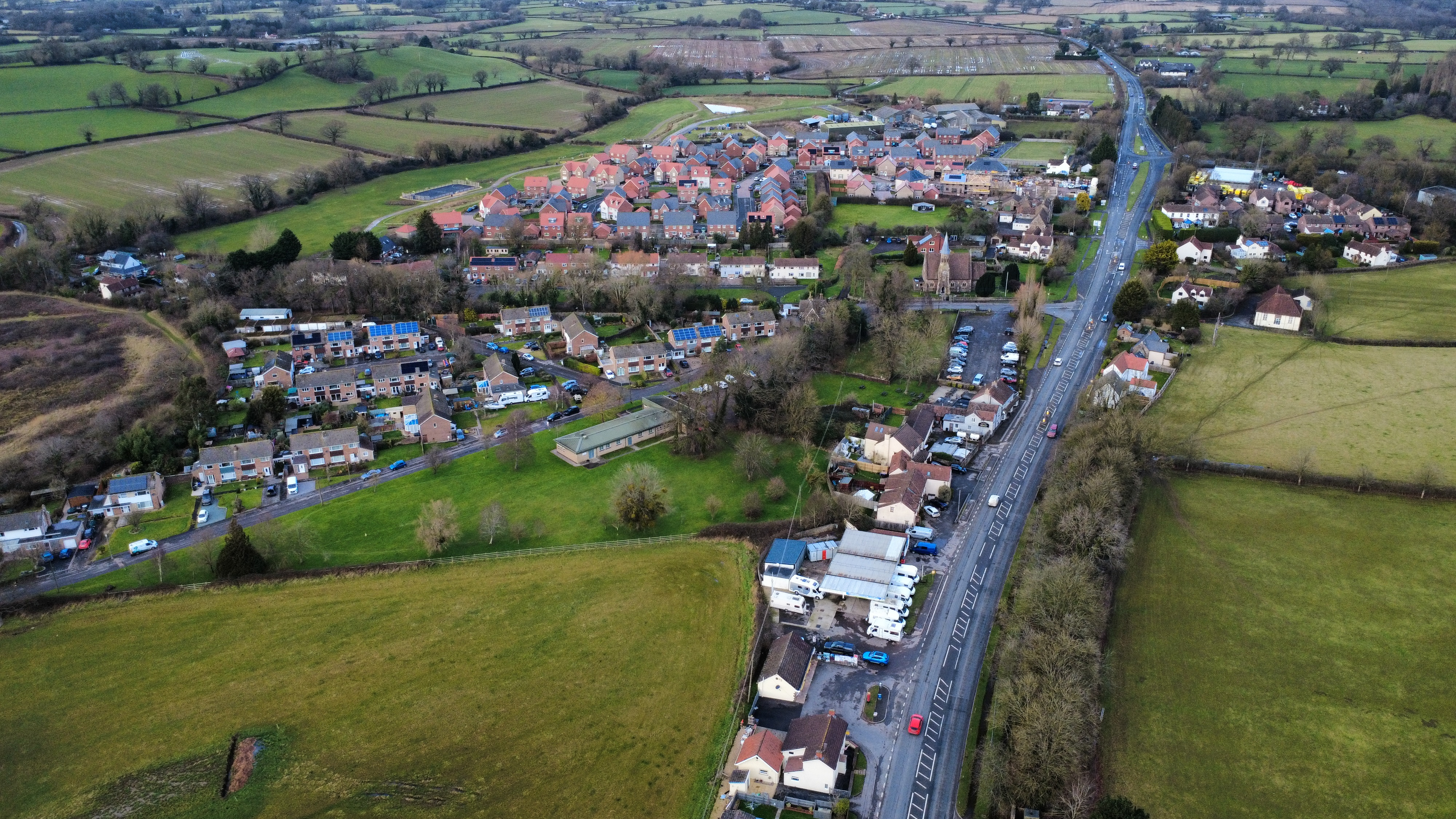
- Falfield (village), looking north.

- Location within Gloucestershire
- Population: 762 (2011)
- OS grid reference: ST 68344 93271
- Civil parish: Falfield
- Unitary authority: South Gloucestershire
- Ceremonial county: Gloucestershire
- Region: South West
- Country: England
- Sovereign state: United Kingdom
- Post town: Wotton-Under-Edge
- Postcode district: GL12
- Police: Avon and Somerset
- Fire: Avon
- Ambulance: South Western
- UK Parliament: Thornbury & Yate

Falfield is a village and civil parish in the Charfield ward of South Gloucestershire, near the boundary with Stroud District, and within the ceremonial county of Gloucestershire. The village is situated on the A38 Gloucester Road, immediately west of junction 14 of the M5 motorway. In Norman times, it formed part of the historical Bagstone Hundred of Gloucestershire and later the Thornbury Hundred.

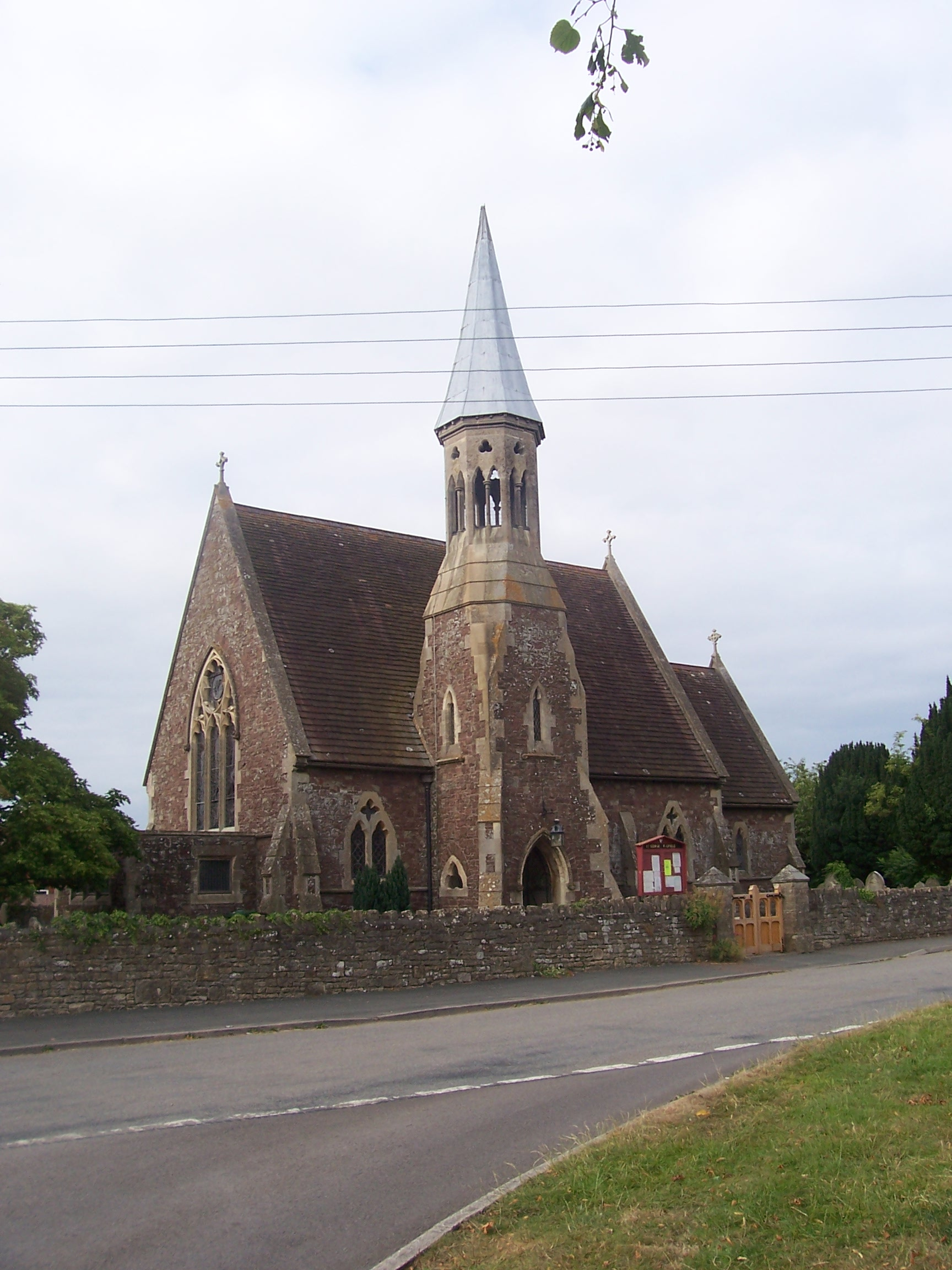
St. George's Church, built in 1860.

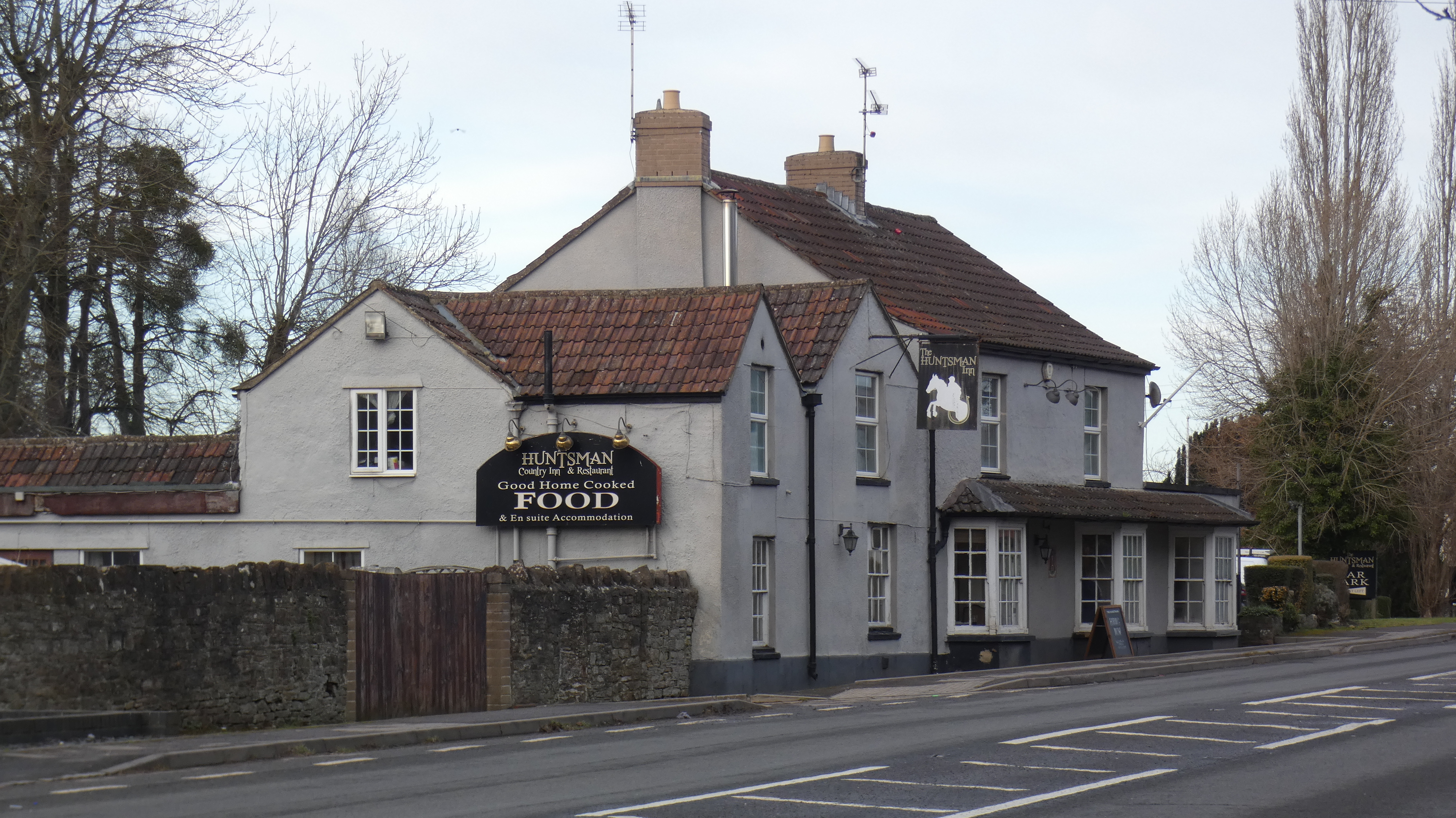
The Huntsman's Inn, formerly Huntsman's House.

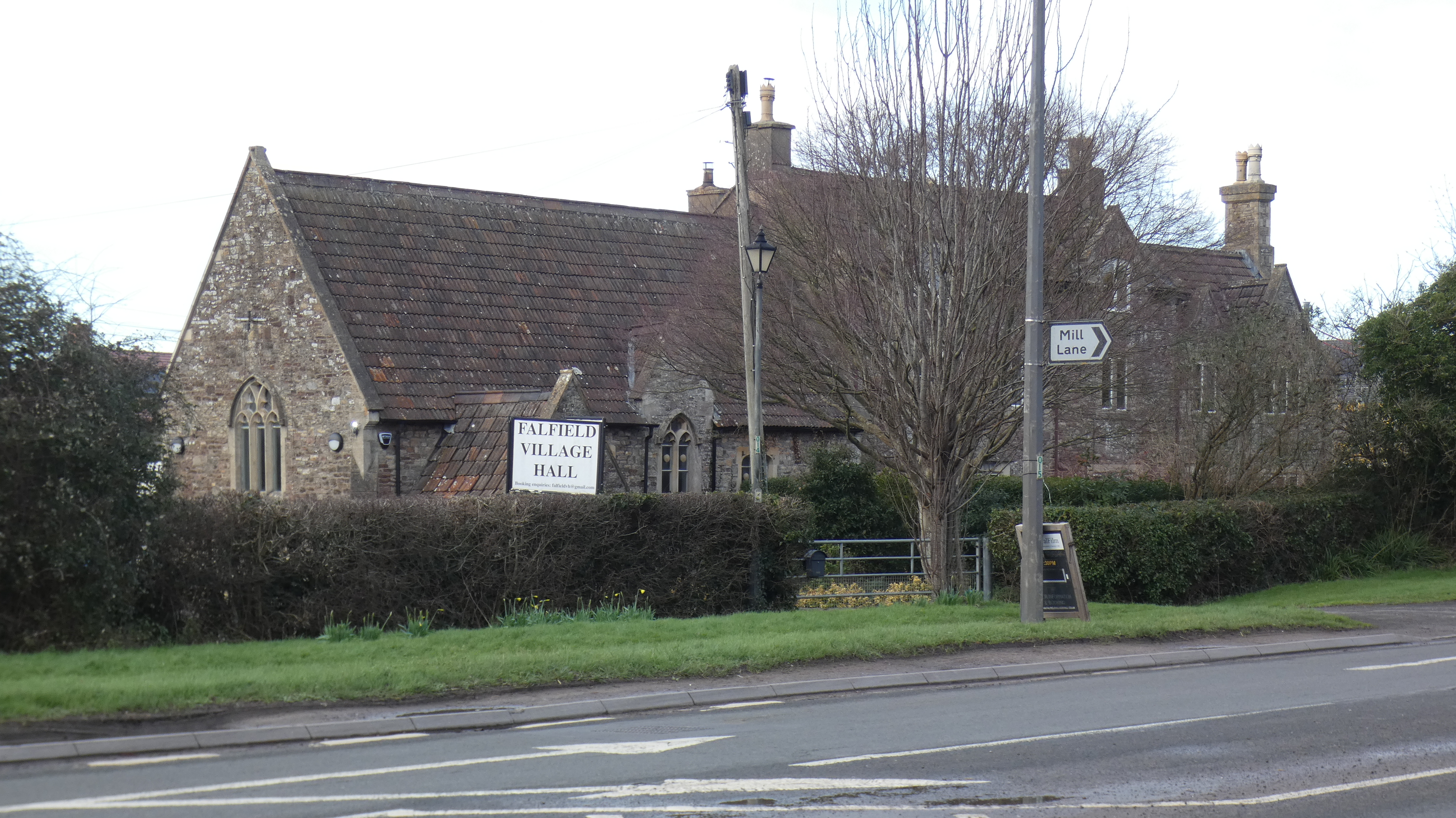
Falfield Village Hall

== Geography ==
Falfield is at the west of a tributary of the Little Avon River. The linear part of the village along the A38 lies on the Tortworth Beds, sedimentary bedrock made of mudstone formed between 438.5 and 433.4 million years ago in the Silurian period. To the east are areas of calcareous limestone and mudstone and to the west mudstone, siltstone and sandstone of the Mercia Mudstone Group, also sedimentary bedrock formed between 252.2 and 201.3 million years ago during the Triassic. Superficially, there are river terrace sediments of clay, silt and sand formed between 2.588 million years ago and the present during the Quaternary period as well as the alluvium of the Little Avon River which is up to 11,800 years old. The elevation in Falfield at the A38 is 30 metres, whereas at the southwest of Eastwood Farm it reaches 68 metres and northeast of Tortworth Court it reaches 85 metres.

== History ==
Although Falfield is not named in the Domesday Book, the surrounding parishes of Charfield, Tortworth and Tytherington were all part of the Bagstone Hundred; a few were later transferred to the Thornbury Hundred. Falfield was part of the Lower Thornbury Hundred in 1832.

Falfield appears on maps going back to 1577, upon which it appears as Faylesfeld, and clearly in the Thornbury Hundred on a map from 1644 with the same spelling. In 1608 a document, Men & Armour, compiled by John Smyth (1567–1641), steward of the Gloucestershire lands of Lord Berkeley, recorded that the majority of the men in the village were weavers and others were husbandmen (farmers) or tailors.

The land around Eastwood was used for hunting from the Tudor period, part of the large estates of Thornbury Castle. The building of Eastwood Park, southwest of the village of Falfield and home of the Jenkinson family associated with the Conservative Party - was begun in 1820 by Robert Jenkinson, 2nd Earl of Liverpool and Prime Minister. The final additions to the current house were completed in 1865 by George Jenkinson, a Conservative M.P. and 11th baronet resident at Eastwood.

Jenkinson died on 19 January 1892, succeeded by his surviving son George Banks Jenkinson, 12th baronet, who died on 5 June 1915 following pleurisy and pleuro-pneumonia. The contents of the estate were auctioned in February 1916 and the estate itself sold to a resident of Bath. There was a series of owners until it was bought by the Home Office in 1935 and used for civil defence training before and during World War II, followed by police training and NHS engineer training before being sold to Fujitsu in 1997 and finally Eastwood Park Ltd. in 2003. The estate is now used for commercial hire, including civil ceremonies.

The Huntsman's Inn - formerly Huntsman's House - has served the community since at least the 19th century. The village pump was just south of Huntsman's House and the pound was across the road from it along with a smithy.

The ecclesiastical parish of Falfield was formed in 1863; the current parish church, St. Georges', was built three years earlier. George Jenkinson (11th baronet) provided part of the funds for the church's construction, the rest being raised by subscription. The musician and composer, Charles Harford Lloyd, who was born in Thornbury, served in the local church and came there to play the organ. The church register had entries dating back to 1813, with local entries prior to that included in the registers at Thornbury, 5 kilometres (3 miles) to the southeast. The civil parish of Falfield was constituted in 1896, leaving that of Thornbury.

The road opposite St. George's leads to HM Prison Eastwood Park, a women's prison with about 400 prisoners.

== Scheduled Monuments ==
There are about two dozen scheduled monuments around Falfield. The manor of Tortworth, east of the village, was purchased by Robert Ducie in 1610 and included a 16th-century house (Ducie was later Sheriff and Lord Mayor of London). The listed remains of the old windmill which appears on old maps date from 1708. Heneage Farmhouse, formerly known as Falfield Farmhouse, and Pool Farmhouse date from the mid- to late-17th century. Heneage Court also dates from the 17th century. The existing remains of Falfield Mill - a corn mill - were built in 1797 by the tributary of the Little Avon River that runs to the east of the village centre. Eastwood Park was listed in 1984. The disused Non-Conformist church on the east of Gloucester Road was first built in 1813 before additions. St. George's is scheduled, as is the war memorial which was relocated next to it.

== Demographics and governance ==
The recorded population of the Charfield Ward which includes Falfield was 5278 at the 2021 United Kingdom census (aggregated data from the 2011 United Kingdom census gave the population of the parish of Falfield as 762 - 280 males and 482 females [including the women's prison]). 96.5% of people in Charfield Ward identified as "White", 18.7% were disabled under the Equality Act, 75.6% of households were single-family, 41.8% of households were owned and 96% owned a vehicle. 1.6% of people who were not retired were unemployed. 34% of residents had a degree-level education and 12.7% had no qualifications. 4.5% of residents over 16 were full-time students.

Charfield Ward is represented in South Gloucestershire Council by Liberal Democrat councillor John O'Neill (2025). Charfield is in the Thornbury and Yate parliamentary constituency; from 2024, the local M.P. is Claire Young, also a member of the Liberal Democrats.
