= John Royce =

British High Court judge

Sir Roger John Royce (born 27 August 1944), styled The Hon. Mr Justice Royce, is a British judge who served as a justice of the High Court of England and Wales.

Born in Virginia Water, Surrey, he attended The Leys School and Trinity Hall, Cambridge. He was awarded Blue at Cambridge for field hockey, and later captained the Somerset county hockey team. In 1970 he was called to the Bar, Gray's Inn, and appointed as QC in 1987.

He presided over the 2009 Plymouth child abuse trial, and sentenced the defendants to Indeterminate Public Protection prison terms, intended to protect the public against criminals regarded as too dangerous to be released when their original sentence has finished. In 2013, he presided over the trial of former Lostprophets singer Ian Watkins, who was sentenced to 29 years in prison with a further 6 years on extended licence after admitting to the attempted rape of a baby boy and 12 other offences.
