= Michele Elliott =

Michele Elliott OBE
- Born: Michele Irmiter Elliott; 1946 (age 79–80)
- Education: BA, MA, PHD
- Alma mater: University of South Florida; University of Florida
- Spouse: Edward Elliott
- Children: 2 sons
- Parent(s): James and Ivy Irmiter

Michele Irmiter Elliott OBE (born 1946) is an author, psychologist, teacher and the founder and director of child protection charity Kidscape. She has chaired World Health Organization and Home Office working groups and is a Winston Churchill fellow.

== Early life ==
Elliott was born on 7 January 1946 to James Irmiter and Ivy (née Dashwood). She graduated from Hollins School in 1964. She was awarded a BA in Science and Education and an MA degree in psychology from the University of South Florida and the University of Florida She began working with families and children in 1968 in London.

== Work ==
Elliott worked as a child psychologist in London schools for 14 years, then started lecturing about the issues child sexual abuse and bullying.

== Kidscape ==
Elliott founded Kidscape in 1985 to help children stay safe from sexual abuse and from bullying.

Elliott has been a high-profile figure and Kidscape was named Charity of the Year in 2000. Writing in The Guardian, David Brindle suggested the award was "an undoubted reflection of the vibrancy of Michele Elliott".

== Female child sexual abuse offenders ==
Elliott, who had previously written books about male abuse of children, has undertaken pioneering work in investigating and raising awareness of the problem and extent of child sexual abuse committed by women, and the topic of female paedophilia, publishing the book Female Sexual Abuse of Children The Last Taboo in 1992. The book was well received by professionals and survivors' organisations. Mike Lew described it as "an important and challenging work", helping "to forge a new understanding of the issues". Doody's annual stated it was "an extremely valuable book for all professionals, and it greatly increases the current state of knowledge, or lack of that knowledge, that can have a profound influence on the survivor's development and recovery".

Elliott's work in exposing the issue of child sexual abuse committed by women has also resulted in hostility from feminists. While compiling Female Sexual Abuse of Children, Elliott organised a conference in London concerning sexual abuse by women. After publishing the book, Elliott was subject to a "deluge" of hate mail from feminists.

== Awards ==
In 2008 Elliot was honoured with an OBE by the Queen for services to children. The following year she was named Children and Young People's Champion. She was awarded an honorary doctorate by Post University in 1998 and another honorary doctorate by the University of Birmingham in 2003. She was awarded a Winston Churchill Fellowship in 1996. Her book, "Bullies, Cyberbullies and Frenemies" received the Literary Classics Gold Award in 2013.

== Personal life ==
Elliot married Edward Elliott in 1964; they have two sons and 3 grandchildren. She lives in Rye, East Sussex.

== Publications ==
- Keeping Safe: A Practical Guide to Talking with Children by Michele Elliott and Alice Englander, 1986, NCVO Publications, ISBN 978-0-7199-1187-3
- The Willow Street Kids: It's Your Right to be Safe by Michele Elliott, 1986, Andre Deutsch Ltd ISBN 978-0-233-97954-0
- The Willow Street Kids: Be Smart Stay Safe by Michele Elliott, 1987, Piccolo Books ISBN 978-0-330-29701-1
- Feeling Happy, Feeling Safe by Michele Elliott, 1991, Hodder Children's Books, ISBN 978-0-340-55386-2
- Female Sexual Abuse Of Children: The Ultimate Taboo by Michele Elliott, 1994, Guilford Press ISBN 978-0-471-97221-1
- Keeping Safe by Phil Collins and Michele Elliott, 1994, Hodder & Stoughton Ltd ISBN 978-0-340-62482-1
- Teenscape: Personal Safety Programme for Teenagers by Michele Elliott, 1995, Health Education Authority ISBN 978-0-7521-0279-5
- 501 Ways to be a Good Parent by Michele Elliott, 1996, Hodder Mobius ISBN 978-0-340-64903-9
- 101 Ways to Deal with Bullying: A Guide for Parents by Michele Elliott, 1997, Hodder Mobius, ISBN 978-0-340-69519-7
- The Willow Street Kids: Be Smart Stay Safe by Michele Elliott, 1997, Macmillan Children's Books, ISBN 978-0-330-35184-3
- The Willow Street Kids: Beat the Bullies by Michele Elliott, 1997, Macmillan Children's Books, ISBN 978-0-330-35185-0
- 601 Ways to Be a Good Parent: A Practical Handbook for Raising Children Ages Four to Twelve, by Michele Elliott, 1999, Citadel, ISBN 978-0-8065-2072-8
- Bully-free: Activities to Promote Confidence and Friendship by Michele Elliott, Gaby Shenton and Roz Eirew, 1999, Kidscape ISBN 978-1-872572-11-6
- How to Stop Bullying by Michele Elliott and Jane Kirkpatrick, 2001, Kidscape ISBN 978-1-872572-01-7
- Bullying: A Practical Guide to Coping for Schools by Michele Elliott, 2002, Pearson Education, ISBN 978-0-273-65923-5
- Dealing with Bullying: Training Guide for Teachers of Children and Young People with Special Needs by Michele Elliott, Claude Knights, 2008, Kidscape ISBN 9781872572-21-5
- The Essential Guide to Tackling Bullying: Practical Skills for Teachers by Michele Elliott, 2011, Longman, ISBN 978-1-4082-6483-6
- "Bullies, Cyberbullies and Frenemies", by Michele Elliott, 2013, Hodder, ISBN 978-07-502-7214-8
- "Stop Bullying Pocketbook", 2nd edition, by Michele Elliott, 2010, Teachers' Pocketbooks, ISBN 978-1906610265
- "PONLE UN ALTO AL BULLYING", by Michele Elliott, 2014, Educacion Aplicada, Mexico, ISBN 978-6079-347048
