= Kidscape =

British child safety organization

Kidscape Campaign For Children's Safety
- Founded: 1985
- Founder: Michele Elliott
- Location: London
- Revenue: £579,219
- Employees: 13
- Website: www.kidscape.org.uk

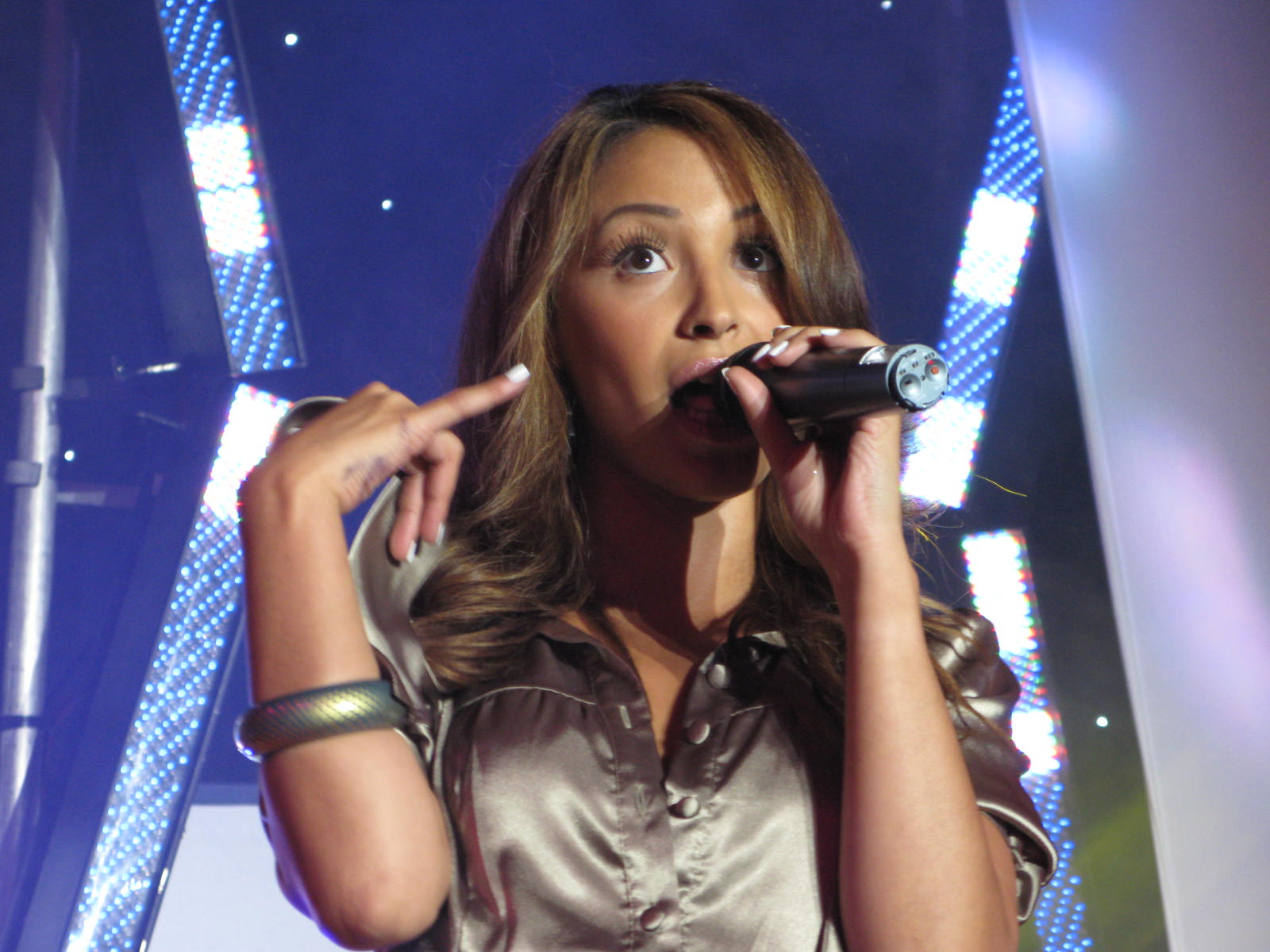
Amelle at Kidscape in 2007

Kidscape is a London-based charity established in 1985, by child psychologist Michele Elliott. Its focus is on children's safety, with an emphasis on the prevention of harm by equipping children with techniques and mindsets that help them stay safe.

After a 1984–1986 survey of 4,000 children, their parents and teachers, it was apparent that the main threat to children came from people known to them – bullies, friends, or family members. Kidscape's Child Protection programmes are now taught UK-wide in thousands of schools and community groups.

== Activities ==
Kidscape's work falls into four main categories:

- Providing children, families and professionals with advice and information to keep children safe.
- Providing a range of training opportunities for professionals working with children and young people to support the provision of safe and nurturing environments.
- Delivering high impact programmes of support for children, parents, care-givers and professionals to prevent bullying and keep children safe.
- Working through a variety of communication channels, partners, campaigns and events to raise awareness of bullying and how to stop it.

== Work with external organisations ==
Kidscape is a member of the Anti-bullying Alliance and the National Suicide Prevention Alliance.

== Awards ==
- In 1998, Smith Kline Beecham awarded Kidscape an Impact Award recognising Kidscape's work in improving community health.
- In September 2000, Kidscape was named UK Charity of the Year in the first Charity Times awards.
- In 2007, Kidscape was Highly Commended in the 2007 Charity Awards Children and Youth category and Michele Elliott was Highly Commended in the Charity Principal of the Year category.
- In the New Year Honours 2008, Michele Elliott was awarded an Order of the British Empire by The Queen in recognition of her services to children.

== Patrons and trustees ==
Kidscape's patrons are children's author and journalist Anthony Horowitz and Dame Mary Perkins, co-founder of Specsavers.

Northampton mental health campaigner, Joe Plumb, is a trustee.

== Controversy ==
The effectiveness of Kidscape's methods for handling bullying behaviour were criticised in 1997 for not being benchmarked against other methods for preventing bullying. In some cases other education experts felt that Kidscape's methods might encourage further bullying. However, a 2018 independent evaluation of Kidscape's approach found that 98% of children felt more able to deal with bullying and three-quarters experienced a significant and sustained drop in bullying.
