= 2016–17 all-female UK terror plot =

- Perpetrators: Safaa Boular, Mina Dich, Rizlaine Boular, Khawla Barghouthi

Between 2016 and 2017, UK Counter Terrorism Policing discovered and monitored an Islamic State-inspired plot by four women, three of whom were family members, to carry out terrorist attacks in London, in what was described as Britain's first all-female terrorist plot.

== Background ==
The sisters Safaa and Rizlaine Boular had wanted to go to Syria to marry ISIL fighters. Rizlaine had tried to go but was stopped in Turkey and returned to the UK, and the police took Safaa's passport to prevent her from going. Safaa Boular willingly admitted to having 300 to 400 ISIL 'friends' online, and police discovered online discussions between her and an ISIL jihadist from Coventry named Naweed Hussain about suicide bombings, her wearing a suicide belt, and how they would plan to marry in Syria. They shared violent images between them, including of executions, and Safaa began to do so when she was only 16. She also supported and shared ISIS material online. Her communications also showed her discussing her attack plans with her sister, Rizlaine, 22, and mother, Mina Dich, 44, and when she was arrested she asked them to carry out the attack without her. Rizlaine and Dich were caught on CCTV buying knives from a supermarket, intending to stab a police officer near Parliament. The two also drove around landmarks in Westminster in preparations for attacks, and it was ultimately concluded that the attack was planned to take place only the day after they were all arrested.

Safaa Boular was found guilty of preparing terrorist attacks for plotting a suicide bomb and gun attack at the British Museum, and sentenced to life imprisonment with a minimum of 13 years imprisonment (later reduced on appeal). Her mother Mina Dich, 44, and sister Rizlaine Boular, 22, were convicted for their part in planning the attacks, with Rizlaine being sentenced to a minimum of 16 years imprisonment and Dich being sentenced to six years and nine months’ imprisonment and an additional five years on licence. 21-year-old Khawla Barghouthi was further convicted of having information about acts of terrorism and sentenced to 28 months' imprisonment; she was a friend of Rizlaine's who had known about the plot and failed to inform police. At 18, Safaa Boular became the youngest woman to be convicted of plotting a terror attack in the UK. The discovery of the plot was reported on internationally.

In April 2019, Safaa Boular's minimum sentence was reduced on appeal to 11 years. In April 2023, it was reported that Mina Dich wanted to be released from prison, claiming she was not a danger to the public.

== See also ==
- Tareena Shakil
- Lisa Smith, former Irish soldier who converted to Islam and later travelled to Syria in 2015 to join ISIS
